= 2018 FIBA U18 European Championship =

International basketball competition

Tournament details
- Host country: Latvia
- City: Riga, Ventspils, Liepāja
- Dates: 28 July – 5 August
- Teams: 16
- Venue(s): 4 (in 3 host cities)

Final positions
- Champions: Serbia (4th title)
- Runners-up: Latvia
- Third place: France
- Fourth place: Russia

Tournament statistics
- MVP: (Serbia) Marko Pecarski
- Top scorer: (Serbia) Marko Pecarski

Official website
- www.fiba.basketball

The 2018 FIBA U18 European Championship was the 35th edition of the FIBA U18 European Championship. The competition took place in Riga, Ventspils and Liepāja, Latvia, from 28 July to 5 August 2018.

== Participating teams ==
- Bosnia and Herzegovina
- Croatia ▲ (Winners, 2017 FIBA U18 European Championship Division B)
- Finland
- France
- Germany
- Great Britain ▲ (Runners-up, 2017 FIBA U18 European Championship Division B)
- Greece (Automatically qualified for the 2019 FIBA Under-19 Basketball World Cup as the hosts)
- Italy
- Latvia (Automatically qualified as the hosts)
- Lithuania
- Montenegro
- Russia
- Serbia
- Spain
- Turkey
- Ukraine

== Preliminary round ==
The draw ceremony was held on 16 January 2018 in Freising, Germany.

All times are local (UTC+3).

=== Group A ===
Pos	Team	Pld	W	L	PF	PA	PD	Pts
1	Latvia (H)	3	2	1	243	219	+24	5 (Note: Latvia 80–74 Greece)
2	Greece	3	2	1	231	212	+19	5
3	Italy	3	1	2	207	238	−31	4 (Note: Italy 74–67 Croatia)
4	Croatia	3	1	2	211	223	−12	4

Source: FIBA
Rules for classification: 1) Points; 2) Head-to-head results; 3) Points difference; 4) Points scored.
(H) Hosts
Notes:

28 July 2018
16:15

Boxscore

Greece	81–65	Italy

Olympic Center, Ventspils
Attendance: 100

28 July 2018
18:30

Boxscore

Croatia	77–73	Latvia

Olympic Center, Ventspils
Attendance: 500

29 July 2018
14:00

Boxscore

Italy	74–67	Croatia

Olympic Center, Ventspils
Attendance: 80

29 July 2018
18:30

Boxscore

Latvia	80–74	Greece

Olympic Center, Ventspils
Attendance: 650

31 July 2018
14:00

Boxscore

Croatia	67–76	Greece

Olympic Center, Ventspils
Attendance: 80

31 July 2018
18:30

Boxscore

Italy	68–90	Latvia

Olympic Center, Ventspils
Attendance: 550

=== Group B ===
Pos	Team	Pld	W	L	PF	PA	PD	Pts
1	Germany	3	2	1	235	221	+14	5 (Note: Germany 75–72 Russia)
2	Russia	3	2	1	219	211	+8	5
3	France	3	1	2	234	242	−8	4 (Note: France 78–67 Turkey)
4	Turkey	3	1	2	196	210	−14	4

Source: FIBA
Rules for classification: 1) Points; 2) Head-to-head results; 3) Points difference; 4) Points scored.
Notes:

28 July 2018
14:00

Boxscore

Turkey	73–67	Germany

Olympic Center, Ventspils
Attendance: 250

28 July 2018
20:45

Boxscore

Russia	82–80	France
Scoring by quarter: 26–20, 23–24, 21–16, 12–20
Pts: Ershov 14; Rebs: three players 7 Asts: Shcherbenev 5		Pts: Ayayi 18; Rebs: Ayayi 6 Asts: Crusol 5

Olympic Center, Ventspils
Attendance: 150
Referees: Radomir Vojinović (MNE), Jan Baloun (CZE), Vladimir Jevtović (SRB)

29 July 2018
16:15

Boxscore

France	78–67	Turkey

Olympic Center, Ventspils
Attendance: 100

29 July 2018
20:45

Boxscore

Germany	75–72	Russia
Scoring by quarter: 20–18, 12–22, 19–23, 24–9
Pts: George 15; Rebs: Hollersbacher 8 Asts: Mattisseck 4		Pts: Mikhailovskii 14; Rebs: Kadoshnikov 10; Asts: Shcherbenev 4

Olympic Center, Ventspils
Attendance: 100
Referees: Ernad Karović (BIH), Geert Jacobs (BEL), Nicolae Dragoş (ROU)

31 July 2018
16:15

Boxscore

Turkey	56–65	Russia
Scoring by quarter: 14–23, 16–13, 15–14, 11–15
Pts: Akyüz 20; Rebs: Tırpancı 11; Asts: Akyüz 3		Pts: Ershov 12; Rebs: Mikhailovskii, Zakharov 8 Asts: Mikhailovskii, Shcherbenev 3

Olympic Center, Ventspils
Attendance: 250
Referees: Gytis Vilius (LTU), Jan Baloun (CZE), Vladimir Jevtović (SRB)

31 July 2018
20:45

Boxscore

France	76–93	Germany

Olympic Center, Ventspils
Attendance: 100

=== Group C ===
Pos	Team	Pld	W	L	PF	PA	PD	Pts
1	Spain	3	3	0	276	172	+104	6
2	Finland	3	2	1	222	202	+20	5
3	Ukraine	3	1	2	189	252	−63	4
4	Bosnia and Herzegovina	3	0	3	199	260	−61	3

Source: FIBA
Rules for classification: 1) Points; 2) Head-to-head results; 3) Points difference; 4) Points scored.

28 July 2018
18:30

Boxscore

Spain	94–64	Bosnia and Herzegovina

Olympic Center, Liepāja
Attendance: 100

28 July 2018
20:45

Boxscore

Ukraine	56–81	Finland

Olympic Center, Liepāja
Attendance: 80

29 July 2018
18:30

Boxscore

Bosnia and Herzegovina	67–80	Ukraine

Olympic Center, Liepāja
Attendance: 50

29 July 2018
20:45

Boxscore

Finland	55–78	Spain

Olympic Center, Liepāja
Attendance: 80

31 July 2018
16:15

Boxscore

Finland	86–68	Bosnia and Herzegovina

Olympic Center, Liepāja
Attendance: 80

31 July 2018
20:45

Boxscore

Spain	104–53	Ukraine

Olympic Center, Liepāja
Attendance: 100

=== Group D ===
Pos	Team	Pld	W	L	PF	PA	PD	Pts
1	Lithuania	3	3	0	264	246	+18	6
2	Serbia	3	2	1	286	258	+28	5
3	Great Britain	3	1	2	240	273	−33	4
4	Montenegro	3	0	3	250	263	−13	3

Source: FIBA
Rules for classification: 1) Points; 2) Head-to-head results; 3) Points difference; 4) Points scored.

28 July 2018
14:00

Boxscore

Great Britain	87–78	Montenegro

Olympic Center, Liepāja
Attendance: 70

28 July 2018
16:15

Boxscore

Lithuania	92–87	Serbia

Olympic Center, Liepāja
Attendance: 250

29 July 2018
14:00

Boxscore

Serbia	102–71	Great Britain

Olympic Center, Liepāja
Attendance: 100

29 July 2018
16:15

Boxscore

Montenegro	77–79	Lithuania

Olympic Center, Liepāja
Attendance: 300

31 July 2018
14:00

Boxscore

Montenegro	95–97 (OT)	Serbia
Scoring by quarter: 32–27, 17–12, 19–22, 16–23, Overtime: 11–13

Olympic Center, Liepāja
Attendance: 70

31 July 2018
18:30

Boxscore

Lithuania	93–82	Great Britain

Olympic Center, Liepāja
Attendance: 100

== Final round ==
=== Bracket ===
Round of 16
1 August
Latvia	62
Turkey	61
1 August
Finland	73
Great Britain	77
1 August
Russia	79
Italy	66
1 August
Lithuania	104
Bosnia and Herzegovina	71
1 August
Greece	81
France	86
1 August
Spain	78
Montenegro	83
1 August
Germany	73
Croatia	60
1 August
Serbia	121
Ukraine	49

Quarterfinals
3 August
Latvia	76
Great Britain	51
3 August
Russia	79
Lithuania	77
3 August
France (OT)	76
Montenegro	74
3 August
Germany	86
Serbia	92

Semifinals
4 August
Latvia	91
Russia	80
4 August
France	67
Serbia	78

Final
5 August
Latvia	90
Serbia	99
3rd place match
5 August
Russia	70
France	79

5th–8th place semifinals
4 August
Great Britain	68
Lithuania	100
4 August
Montenegro	52
Germany	76

5th place match
5 August
Lithuania	83
Germany	55
7th place match
5 August
Great Britain	70
Montenegro	68

9th–16th place quarterfinals
3 August
Turkey	74
Finland	56
3 August
Italy (OT)	98
Bosnia and Herzegovina	96
3 August
Greece	70
Spain	85
3 August
Croatia	85
Ukraine	62

9th–12th place semifinals
4 August
Turkey	69
Italy	79
4 August
Spain	89
Croatia	52

9th place match
5 August
Italy	62
Spain	80
11th place match
5 August
Turkey	72
Croatia (OT)	74

13th–16th place semifinals
4 August
Finland	79
Bosnia and Herzegovina	55
4 August
Greece	77
Ukraine	73

13th place match
5 August
Finland (OT)	89
Greece	85
15th place match
5 August
Bosnia and Herzegovina	88
Ukraine	94

=== Round of 16 ===
1 August 2018
14:00

Boxscore

Finland	73–77	Great Britain
Scoring by quarter: 19–24, 17–14, 19–24, 18–15
Pts: Tahvanainen 24; Rebs: Jantunen 12; Asts: Jantunen, Tahvanainen 5		Pts: Okros 20; Rebs: Kitenge 12; Asts: Queeley 6

Olympic Center, Liepāja
Attendance: 80
Referees: Sergei Beliakov (RUS), Beniamino Attard (ITA), Thomas Bissuel (BEL)

1 August 2018
14:00

Boxscore

Russia	79–66	Italy
Scoring by quarter: 24–19, 19–16, 20–17, 16–14
Pts: Ershov, Mikhailovskii 17; Rebs: Mikhailovskii 9 Asts: Ershov 5		Pts: Miaschi 29; Rebs: Palumbo 8 Asts: three players 2

Olympic Center, Ventspils
Attendance: 80
Referees: Radomir Vojinović (MNE), Vladimir Jevtović (SRB), Nicolae Dragoş (ROU)

1 August 2018
16:15

Boxscore

Lithuania	104–71	Bosnia and Herzegovina
Scoring by quarter: 32–22, 30–15, 20–22, 22–11
Pts: Urbonavičius 18; Rebs: Urbonavičius 6 Asts: Jokubaitis 8		Pts: Ilić 20; Rebs: Matković 7 Asts: Kamerić, Matković 7

Olympic Center, Liepāja
Attendance: 100
Referees: Mehmet Karabilecen (TUR), Josip Jurčević (CRO), Gatis Saliņš (LAT)

1 August 2018
16:15

Boxscore

Greece	81–86	France
Scoring by quarter: 16–27, 28–13, 21–21, 16–25
Pts: Rogkavopoulos 21; Rebs: three players 5 Asts: Gargalis, Rogkavopoulos 4		Pts: Ayayi 31; Rebs: Dimanche, Dossou-Yovo 7 Asts: Dimanche 9

Olympic Center, Ventspils
Attendance: 200
Referees: Ernad Karović (BIH), Jan Baloun (CZE), Eduard Udyanskyy (GBR)

1 August 2018
18:30

Boxscore

Serbia	121–49	Ukraine
Scoring by quarter: 28–19, 28–13, 32–12, 33–5
Pts: Petrušev 25; Rebs: Pecarski, Petrušev 9 Asts: Paunović 7		Pts: Orzul 15; Rebs: Markovetskyy 7 Asts: Zaiets 3

Olympic Center, Liepāja
Attendance: 50
Referees: Gentian Cici (ALB), Guido Giovannetti (ITA), Stylianos Simeonidis (GRE)

1 August 2018
18:30

Boxscore

Latvia	62–61	Turkey
Scoring by quarter: 30–16, 12–13, 5–19, 15–13
Pts: Kurucs 16; Rebs: Šnipke 8 Asts: Žagars 9		Pts: Tırpancı 13; Rebs: Sezgün 6 Asts: Akay 9

Olympic Center, Ventspils
Attendance: 800
Referees: Luis Castillo (ESP), Sergii Tyslenko (UKR), Nikola Bejat (NOR)

1 August 2018
20:45

Boxscore

Spain	78–83	Montenegro
Scoring by quarter: 20–12, 14–17, 20–29, 24–25
Pts: Cuevas 18; Rebs: Parra 8 Asts: Alocén 8		Pts: Titić, Žižić 18; Rebs: Tomašević 7 Asts: Drobnjak, Titić 5

Olympic Center, Liepāja
Attendance: 100
Referees: Blaž Zupančič (SLO), Kyriacos Christou (CYP), Martin Vulić (CRO)

1 August 2018
20:45

Boxscore

Germany	73–60	Croatia
Scoring by quarter: 16–14, 15–18, 18–12, 24–16
Pts: Meredith 11; Rebs: Vrcic 6 Asts: Mattisseck 4		Pts: Vujičić 15; Rebs: Vujičić 8 Asts: Palokaj 5

Olympic Center, Ventspils
Attendance: 50
Referees: Gytis Vilius (LTU), Geert Jacobs (BEL), Joona Haaja (FIN)

=== 9th–16th place quarterfinals ===
3 August 2018
14:00

Boxscore

Greece	70–85	Spain
Scoring by quarter: 17–25, 19–19, 12–13, 22–28
Pts: Tsoumanis 12; Rebs: Rogkavopoulos 6 Asts: three players 2		Pts: Parra 17; Rebs: Sola 9 Asts: Alocén 7

Olympic Sports Centre, Riga
Attendance: 100
Referees: Radomir Vojinović (MNE), Nikola Bejat (NOR), Vladimir Jevtović (SRB)

3 August 2018
16:15

Boxscore

Croatia	85–62	Ukraine
Scoring by quarter: 18–18, 18–17, 24–12, 25–15
Pts: Šamanić 29; Rebs: Planinić 12; Asts: Palokaj 7		Pts: Shorstkyi 14; Rebs: Markovetskyy 8 Asts: Zaiets 3

Olympic Sports Centre, Riga
Attendance: 60
Referees: Mehmet Karabilecen (TUR), Jan Baloun (CZE), Nicolae Dragoş (ROU)

3 August 2018
18:30

Boxscore

Turkey	74–56	Finland
Scoring by quarter: 12–20, 21–10, 27–13, 14–13
Pts: Aydoğan 16; Rebs: Akay 8 Asts: Akay 7		Pts: Storgård 14; Rebs: Jantunen 11; Asts: Exaucia 4

Olympic Sports Centre, Riga
Referees: Gentian Cici (ALB), Gatis Saliņš (LAT), Stylianos Simeonidis (GRE)

3 August 2018
20:45

Boxscore

Italy	98–96 (OT)	Bosnia and Herzegovina
Scoring by quarter: 23–16, 17–20, 10–23, 25–16, Overtime: 10–10, 13–11
Pts: Miaschi 27; Rebs: Palumbo 13; Asts: Palumbo 4		Pts: Ilić 29; Rebs: Omerović 9 Asts: Kamerić 8

Olympic Sports Centre, Riga
Attendance: 25
Referees: Luis Castillo (ESP), Sergii Tyslenko (UKR), Kyriacos Christou (CYP)

=== Quarterfinals ===
3 August 2018
14:00

Boxscore

France	76–74 (OT)	Montenegro
Scoring by quarter: 20–12, 13–24, 20–13, 11–15, Overtime: 12–10
Pts: Dossou-Yovo 20; Rebs: Dossou-Yovo 13; Asts: Ayayi 4		Pts: Žižić 18; Rebs: Žižić 10; Asts: three players 3

Arēna Rīga, Riga
Attendance: 50
Referees: Gytis Vilius (LTU), Joona Haaja (FIN), Guido Giovannetti (ITA)

3 August 2018
16:15

Boxscore

Germany	86–92	Serbia
Scoring by quarter: 26–27, 20–19, 24–20, 16–26
Pts: Hollersbacher 21; Rebs: Drescher 4 Asts: Mattisseck 5		Pts: Paunović 25; Rebs: Pecarski, Petrušev 10; Asts: Trifunović 5

Arēna Rīga, Riga
Attendance: 500
Referees: Sergei Beliakov (RUS), Martin Vulić (CRO), Eduard Udyanskyy (GBR)

3 August 2018
18:30

Boxscore

Latvia	76–51	Great Britain
Scoring by quarter: 14–13, 19–17, 26–13, 17–8
Pts: Kurucs 19; Rebs: Šnipke 11; Asts: Žagars 6		Pts: Robinson 16; Rebs: Kitenge 13; Asts: Brown 2

Arēna Rīga, Riga
Attendance: 2 300
Referees: Blaž Zupančič (SLO), Geert Jacobs (BEL), Josip Jurčević (CRO)

3 August 2018
20:45

Boxscore

Russia	79–77	Lithuania
Scoring by quarter: 12–18, 26–18, 22–18, 19–23
Pts: Mikhailovskii 33; Rebs: Zakharov 8 Asts: Mikhailovskii 5		Pts: Venskus 18; Rebs: Venskus 10; Asts: Sirvydis 8

Arēna Rīga, Riga
Attendance: 300
Referees: Beniamino Attard (ITA), Ernad Karović (BIH), Thomas Bissuel (BEL)

=== 13th–16th place semifinals ===
4 August 2018
14:00

Boxscore

Greece	77–73	Ukraine
Scoring by quarter: 23–18, 27–12, 8–15, 19–28
Pts: Tsirogiannis 22; Rebs: Gargalis 10; Asts: Gargalis, Tsirogiannis 4		Pts: Grytsak 23; Rebs: Markovetskyy 14; Asts: Shorstkyi 5

Olympic Sports Centre, Riga
Attendance: 30
Referees: Luis Castillo (ESP), Geert Jacobs (BEL), Josip Jurčević (CRO)

4 August 2018
16:15

Boxscore

Finland	79–55	Bosnia and Herzegovina
Scoring by quarter: 23–13, 20–18, 21–6, 15–18
Pts: Tahvanainen 22; Rebs: Amzil 6 Asts: Tahvanainen 6		Pts: Bošnjak, Omerović 9 Rebs: Begić 6 Asts: Kamerić 5

Olympic Sports Centre, Riga
Referees: Radomir Vojinović (MNE), Jan Baloun (CZE), Nicolae Dragoş (ROU)

=== 9th–12th place semifinals ===
4 August 2018
18:30

Boxscore

Turkey	69–79	Italy
Scoring by quarter: 14–25, 23–18, 19–15, 13–21
Pts: Sezgün 13; Rebs: Akay 9 Asts: İlyasoğlu 4		Pts: Czumbel 17; Rebs: Dieng 9 Asts: Miaschi 7

Olympic Sports Centre, Riga
Referees: Sergei Beliakov (RUS), Joona Haaja (FIN), Thomas Bissuel (BEL)

4 August 2018
20:45

Boxscore

Spain	89–52	Croatia
Scoring by quarter: 32–13, 17–14, 29–9, 11–16
Pts: Alocén 21; Rebs: Sola 7 Asts: Alocén 6		Pts: Planinić 25; Rebs: Šamanić 8 Asts: Palokaj 5

Olympic Sports Centre, Riga
Referees: Ernad Karović (BIH), Sergii Tyslenko (UKR), Stylianos Simeonidis (GRE)

=== 5th–8th place semifinals ===
4 August 2018
14:00

Boxscore

Montenegro	52–76	Germany
Scoring by quarter: 10–17, 14–21, 16–22, 12–16
Pts: Brnović 18; Rebs: three players 5 Asts: Drobnjak, Titić 3		Pts: Hollersbacher 12; Rebs: Vrcic 9 Asts: Bruhnke 4

Arēna Rīga, Riga
Attendance: 60
Referees: Beniamino Attard (ITA), Nikola Bejat (NOR), Gatis Saliņš (LAT)

4 August 2018
16:15

Boxscore

Great Britain	68–100	Lithuania
Scoring by quarter: 18–24, 18–29, 15–28, 17–19
Pts: Queeley 15; Rebs: Kitenge 9 Asts: three players 2		Pts: Jarumbauskas 18; Rebs: Urbonavičius 8 Asts: Jokubaitis 8

Arēna Rīga, Riga
Attendance: 100
Referees: Vladimir Jevtović (SRB), Guido Giovannetti (ITA), Kyriacos Christou (CYP)

=== Semifinals ===
4 August 2018
18:30

Boxscore

Latvia	91–80	Russia
Scoring by quarter: 22–28, 20–15, 23–18, 26–19
Pts: Žagars 35; Rebs: Vēveris 6 Asts: Kurucs 7		Pts: Shashkov 24; Rebs: Mikhailovskii 10; Asts: Ershov 5

Arēna Rīga, Riga
Attendance: 3 300
Referees: Gytis Vilius (LTU), Martin Vulić (CRO), Eduard Udyanskyy (GBR)

4 August 2018
20:45

Boxscore

France	67–78	Serbia
Scoring by quarter: 14–20, 18–25, 13–17, 22–16
Pts: Dossou-Yovo 12; Rebs: Dossou-Yovo 12; Asts: Crusol 9		Pts: Pecarski 27; Rebs: Pecarski 12; Asts: Lakić, Petrušev 6

Arēna Rīga, Riga
Attendance: 200
Referees: Gentian Cici (ALB), Blaž Zupančič (SLO), Mehmet Karabilecen (TUR)

=== 15th place game ===
5 August 2018
11:45

Boxscore

Bosnia and Herzegovina	88–94	Ukraine
Scoring by quarter: 14–24, 32–24, 14–21, 28–25
Pts: Ramljak 24; Rebs: Matković 10; Asts: Ramljak 5		Pts: Zaiets 24; Rebs: Markovetskyy 11; Asts: Zaiets 6

Olympic Sports Centre, Riga
Attendance: 45
Referees: Joona Haaja (FIN), Geert Jacobs (BEL), Stylianos Simeonidis (GRE)

=== 13th place game ===
5 August 2018
14:00

Boxscore

Finland	89–85 (OT)	Greece
Scoring by quarter: 21–22, 13–15, 26–12, 15–26, Overtime: 14–10
Pts: Tahvanainen 35; Rebs: Jantunen 16; Asts: Sajantila 5		Pts: Rogkavopoulos 33; Rebs: Gargalis, Rogkavopoulos 10; Asts: Arsenopoulos 4

Arēna Rīga, Riga
Attendance: 50
Referees: Gentian Cici (ALB), Nikola Bejat (NOR), Thomas Bissuel (BEL)

=== 11th place game ===
5 August 2018
16:15

Boxscore

Turkey	72–74 (OT)	Croatia
Scoring by quarter: 24–19, 12–15, 13–15, 13–13, Overtime: 10–12
Pts: Kabaca 19; Rebs: Kabaca 13; Asts: Akyüz 6		Pts: Planinić 24; Rebs: Planinić 12; Asts: Palokaj 11

Olympic Sports Centre, Riga
Attendance: 30
Referees: Beniamino Attard (ITA), Eduard Udyanskyy (GBR), Nicolae Dragoş (ROU)

=== 9th place game ===
5 August 2018
18:30

Boxscore

Italy	62–80	Spain
Scoring by quarter: 16–23, 10–14, 15–26, 21–17
Pts: Graziani 12; Rebs: Palumbo 6 Asts: Czumbel 5		Pts: Cuevas 16; Rebs: Parra 13; Asts: Cuevas 6

Olympic Sports Centre, Riga
Attendance: 80
Referees: Martin Vulić (CRO), Kyriacos Christou (CYP), Jan Baloun (CZE)

=== 7th place game ===
5 August 2018
14:00

Boxscore

Great Britain	70–68	Montenegro
Scoring by quarter: 14–25, 24–16, 13–20, 19–7
Pts: Robinson 19; Rebs: Kitenge 11; Asts: Kitenge 4		Pts: Obradović 17; Rebs: Obradović 11; Asts: Kljajić 6

Olympic Sports Centre, Riga
Attendance: 30
Referees: Luis Castillo (ESP), Sergii Tyslenko (UKR), Ernad Karović (BIH)

=== 5th place game ===
5 August 2018
16:15

Boxscore

Lithuania	83–55	Germany
Scoring by quarter: 23–16, 27–14, 17–10, 16–15
Pts: Sirvydis 20; Rebs: three players 6 Asts: Giedraitis 5		Pts: Drescher 9 Rebs: Vrcic 6 Asts: Lanmüller, Meredith 2

Arēna Rīga, Riga
Attendance: 100
Referees: Sergei Beliakov (RUS), Guido Giovannetti (ITA), Josip Jurčević (CRO)

=== 3rd place game ===
5 August 2018
18:30

Boxscore

Russia	70–79	France
Scoring by quarter: 14–11, 24–15, 22–28, 10–25
Pts: Mikhailovskii 16; Rebs: Mikhailovskii 8 Asts: Shcherbenev 5		Pts: Ayayi 22; Rebs: Dossou-Yovo 10; Asts: Crusol 5

Arēna Rīga, Riga
Attendance: 350
Referees: Radomir Vojinović (MNE), Gatis Saliņš (LAT), Vladimir Jevtović (SRB)

=== Final ===
5 August 2018
20:45

Boxscore

Latvia	90–99	Serbia
Scoring by quarter: 20–32, 21–22, 24–25, 25–20
Pts: Žagars 26; Rebs: Kurucs 5 Asts: Žagars 11		Pts: Pecarski 34; Rebs: Pecarski 13; Asts: Trifunović 5

Arēna Rīga, Riga
Attendance: 7 000
Referees: Gytis Vilius (LTU), Blaž Zupančič (SLO), Mehmet Karabilecen (TUR)

== Final standings ==
Rank	Team	Record
1st place, gold medalist(s)	Serbia	6–1
2nd place, silver medalist(s)	Latvia	5–2
3rd place, bronze medalist(s)	France	4–3
4	Russia	4–3
5	Lithuania	6–1
6	Germany	4–3
7	Great Britain	3–4
8	Montenegro	1–6
9	Spain	6–1
10	Italy	3–4
11	Croatia	3–4
12	Turkey	2–5
13	Finland	4–3
14	Greece	3–4
15	Ukraine	2–5
16	Bosnia and Herzegovina	0–7

Qualified for the 2019 FIBA Under-19 Basketball World Cup
Relegated to the 2019 FIBA U18 European Championship Division B

== Awards ==
2018 FIBA Europe
Under-18 Championship winner

Serbia
Fourth title

Most Valuable Player
(Serbia) Marko Pecarski

All-Tournament Team

- PG – (Latvia) Artūrs Žagars
- SG – (France) Joël Ayayi
- SF – (Russia) Nikita Mikhailovskii
- PF – (Serbia) Marko Pecarski (MVP)
- C – (Serbia) Filip Petrušev

== See also ==
- 2018 FIBA U18 European Championship Division B
- 2018 FIBA U18 European Championship Division C
