= Ivan Ukhov (basketball) =

Russian basketball player

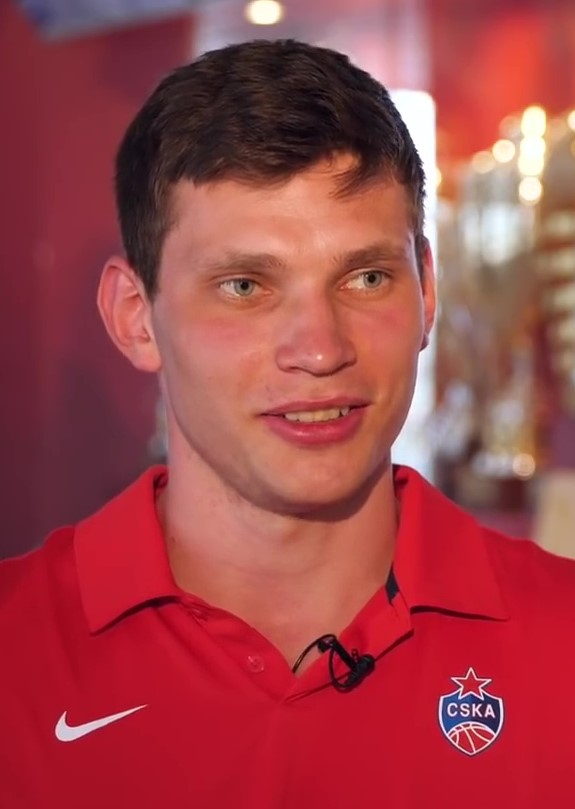

No. 7 – CSKA Moscow
- Position: Shooting guard
- League: VTB United League

Personal information
- Born: September 11, 1995 (age 31) Solikamsk, Perm Krai, Russia
- Listed height: 193 cm (6 ft 4 in)
- Listed weight: 76 kg (168 lb)

Career information
- NBA draft: 2017: undrafted
- Playing career: 2016–present

Career history
- 2016–2018: Parma
- 2018–present: CSKA Moscow

Career highlights
- EuroLeague champion (2019); VTB United League champion (2019); VTB United League Young Player of the Year (2017); Russian Cup winner (2016)

Ivan Ukhov (Russian: Ива́н Анато́льевич У́хов; born September 11, 1995, in Solikamsk) is a Russian professional basketball player for CSKA Moscow of the VTB United League.

== Professional career ==
During the 2016–17 season, Parma Basket entered the VTB United League. Despite poor results of the team in the league, as the team won only one game, Ukhov has personal success as he was named the VTB United League Young Player of the Year.

On July 25, 2018, Ukhov signed a three-year deal with VTB champions CSKA Moscow. On June 21, 2021, Ukhov renewed his contract with CSKA for three (2+1) more seasons.

== Career statistics ==
Legend
GP	Games played	GS	Games started	MPG	Minutes per game
FG%	Field-goal percentage	3P%	3-point field-goal percentage	FT%	Free-throw percentage
RPG	Rebounds per game	APG	Assists per game	SPG	Steals per game
BPG	Blocks per game	PPG	Points per game	PIR	Performance index rating
**Bold**	Career high

=== EuroLeague ===
†	Denotes seasons in which Ukhov won the EuroLeague

Year	Team	GP	GS	MPG	FG%	3P%	FT%	RPG	APG	SPG	BPG	PPG	PIR
2018–19†	CSKA Moscow	13	0	5.5	**.625**	.200	**1.000**	.8	.6	.2	—	1.7	1.8
2019–20†	CSKA Moscow	6	0	5.2	.375	.200	—	**1.2**	.3	.3	—	1.2	0.7
2020–21	CSKA Moscow	**26**	**4**	9.1	.350	**.385**	.250	**.8**	.8	.3	—	2.2	0.7
2021–22	CSKA Moscow	21	1	**10.4**	.386	.351	.750	1.1	**.8**	**.5**	—	**2.4**	**1.9**
Career		66	5	8.5	.398	.349	.556	.9	.7	.3	—	2.1	1.3
