= 2014–15 PBC CSKA Moscow season =

CSKA Moscow
2014–15 season
- Chairman: (Russia) Andrey Vatutin
- Head coach: (Greece) Dimitrios Itoudis
- Arena: CSKA Universal Sports Hall; Megasport Arena
- Euroleague: Third place
- VTB United League: 1st – Champions
- Scoring leader: (France) Nando de Colo (14.6)
- Rebounding leader: (Russia) Andrey Vorontsevich (5.3)
- Assists leader: (Serbia) Miloš Teodosić (5.7)
Home	Away	Third

The 2014–15 season of PBC CSKA Moscow was the 77th season of the club, and the CSKA's 7th season in the VTB United League. The team won the league once again, after also finishing first in the regular season. In the Euroleague, the team ended fourth.

== Key dates ==
- June 19, 2014: Hired head coach Dimitrios Itoudis.
- July 9, 2014: Nando de Colo signs.
- February 25, 2015: Andrei Kirilenko signs.

== Roster ==
PBC CSKA Moscow roster
Players
Coaches

Pos.	No.	Nat.	Name	Ht.	Wt.	Age
PG	1	(France)	de Colo, Nando	1.96 m (6 ft 5 in)	91 kg (201 lb)	38 – 23 June 1987
PG	4	(Serbia)	Teodosić, Miloš	1.95 m (6 ft 5 in)	87 kg (192 lb)	38 – 19 March 1987
SG	7	(Russia)	Fridzon, Vitaly	1.96 m (6 ft 5 in)	81 kg (179 lb)	39 – 14 October 1985
SF	8	(United States)	Nichols, Demetris	1.98 m (6 ft 6 in)	96 kg (212 lb)	41 – 4 September 1984
PG	9	(United States)	Jackson, Aaron	1.90 m (6 ft 3 in)	83 kg (183 lb)	39 – 6 May 1986
SG	11	(Georgia (country))	Markoishvili, Manuchar	1.96 m (6 ft 5 in)	91 kg (201 lb)	38 – 17 November 1986
C	12	(Russia)	Korobkov, Pavel	2.06 m (6 ft 9 in)	99 kg (218 lb)	35 – 18 October 1989
SF	13	(United States)	Weems, Sonny	1.98 m (6 ft 6 in)	93 kg (205 lb)	39 – 8 July 1986
SG	14	(Russia)	Zozulin, Aleksei	1.99 m (6 ft 6 in)	100 kg (220 lb)	42 – 14 January 1983
PG	19	(Russia)	Strebkov, Ivan	1.93 m (6 ft 4 in)	84 kg (185 lb)	34 – 27 July 1991
PF	20	(Russia)	Vorontsevich, Andrey	2.07 m (6 ft 9 in)	107 kg (236 lb)	38 – 17 July 1987
C	24	(Russia)	Kaun, Alexander	2.11 m (6 ft 11 in)	116 kg (256 lb)	40 – 8 May 1985
PF	31	(Russia)	Khryapa, Victor (C)	2.03 m (6 ft 8 in)	101 kg (223 lb)	43 – 3 August 1982
C	42	(United States)	Hines, Kyle	1.98 m (6 ft 6 in)	111 kg (245 lb)	39 – 2 September 1986
F	47	(Russia)	Kirilenko, Andrei	2.06 m (6 ft 9 in)	107 kg (236 lb)	44 – 18 February 1981

Head coach

- (Greece) Dimitrios Itoudis

Assistant coach(es)

- (United States) Darryl Middleton
- (Greece) Andreas Pistiolis
- (Russia) Anton Yudin

Athletic trainer(s)

- (Greece) Kostas Chatzichristos
- (Russia) Eugeniy Burin

Physiotherapist(s)

- (Russia) Asker Barcho

Team manager

- (Russia) Vasiliy Kozlovtsev

Legend

- (C) Team captain
- Injured

== Transactions ==
=== In ===
No.	Pos.	Nat.	Name	Age	Moving from		Type	Ends	Transfer fee	Date	Source
1	PG	(France)	Nando de Colo	27	Toronto Raptors	(Canada)	Free agency	2016	–	9 July 2014	
11	SG	(Georgia (country))	Manuchar Markoishvili	27	Galatasaray Liv Hospital	(Turkey)	Free agency	2016	–	11 July 2014	
12	F	(Russia)	Pavel Korobkov	23	Nizhny Novgorod	(Russia)	Free agency	2017	–	14 July 2014	

=== Out ===
No.	Pos.	Nat.	Name	Age	Moving to		Type	Transfer fee	Date	Source
12	C	(Serbia)	Nenad Krstić	30	Anadolu Efes	(Turkey)	Free agency	–	23 June 2014	
5	G	(Serbia)	Vladimir Micov	29	Galatasaray Liv Hospital	(Turkey)	Expired contract	–	14 July 2014	
11	G	(United States)	Jeremy Pargo	28	Maccabi Tel Aviv	(Israel)	Buyout	–	24 July 2014	

== VTB United League ==
=== Standings ===
Pos	Team	Pld	W	L	PF	PA	PD	Qualification
1	(Russia) CSKA	30	26	4	2713	2151	+562	Qualification to playoffs
2	(Russia) Khimki	30	25	5	2647	2336	+311	Qualification to playoffs
3	(Russia) Lokomotiv Kuban	30	23	7	2582	2242	+340	Qualification to playoffs

Source: VTB United League

=== Playoffs ===
Round	Opponent	Score
Quarterfinals	8 (Kazakhstan) Astana	3–0
Semifinals	5 (Russia) Nizhny Novgorod	3–0
Finals	2 (Russia) Khimki	3–0
