= Nikita Mikhailovskii =

Russian basketball player

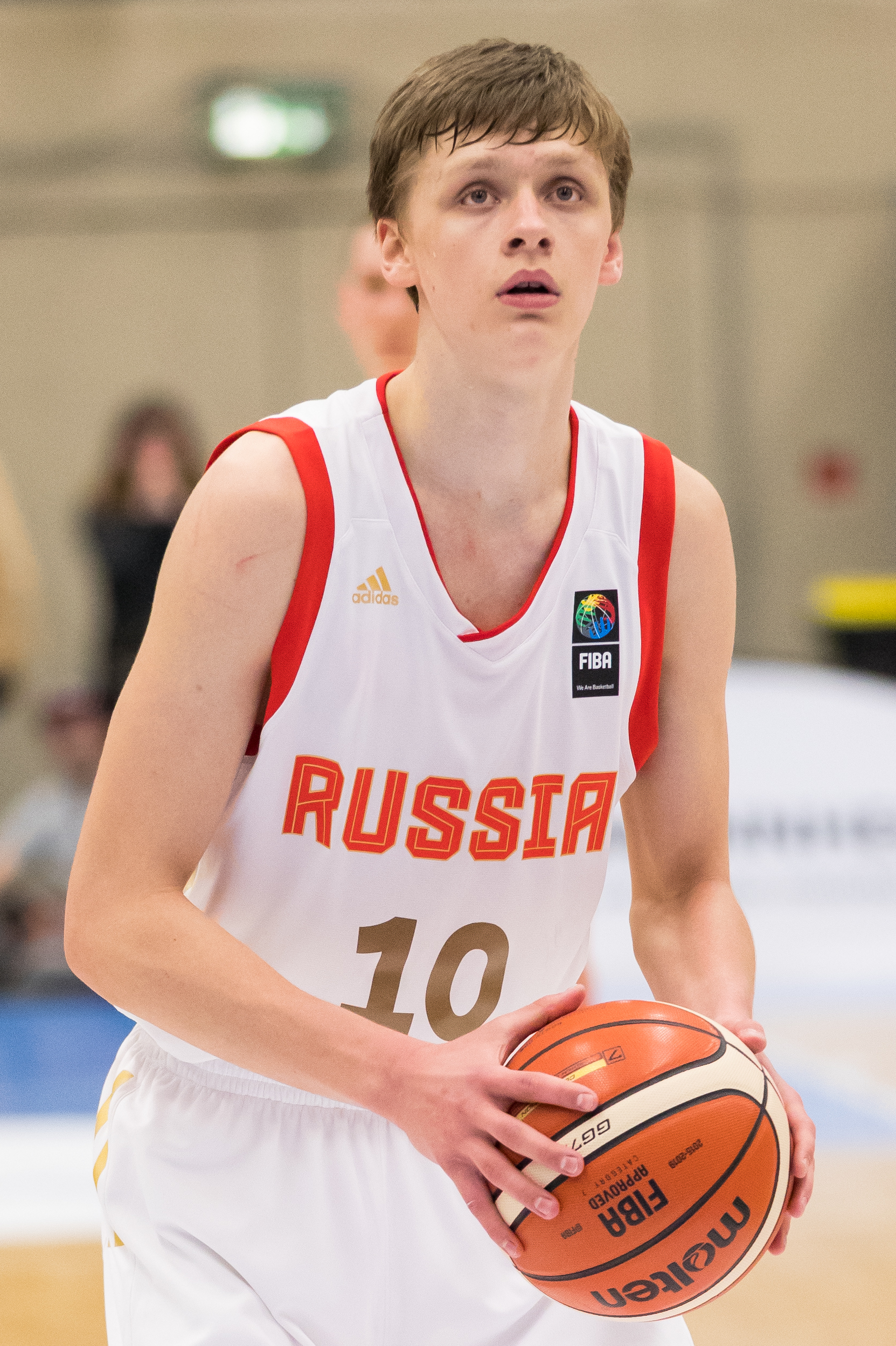
- Mikhailovskii in 2018

No. 10 – UNICS Kazan
- Position: Shooting guard
- League: VTB United League

Personal information
- Born: 10 September 2000 (age 25) Pavlovo, Russia
- Listed height: 6 ft 7 in (2.01 m)
- Listed weight: 196 lb (89 kg)

Career information
- Playing career: 2017–present

Career history
- 2017–2023: Avtodor Saratov
- 2021–2022: →Tasmania JackJumpers
- 2023–2025: CSKA Moscow
- 2025–2026: Samara
- 2026–present: UNICS Kazan

Career highlights
- VTB United League Top Scorer (2026); 2× VTB United League Young Player of the Year (2019, 2021)

Nikita Aleksandrovich Mikhailovskii (Russian: Никита Александрович Михайловский; born 10 September 2000) is a Russian professional basketball player for UNICS Kazan of the VTB United League.

== Professional career ==
=== Avtodor Saratov (2017–2023) ===
On 8 May 2019, Mikhailovskii was named VTB United League Young Player of the Year as the league's top player under age 22.

==== Loan to Tasmania JackJumpers (2021–2022) ====
On 29 July 2021, Mikhailovskii signed as a Next Star with the Tasmania JackJumpers of the Australian National Basketball League (NBL). He remained under contract with BC Avtodor, and his transfer to the Tasmania JackJumpers was technically a loan, with the provision that he might still play in Russia at the end of the season. In March 2022, he was released from the club "by mutual agreement".

=== CSKA Moscow (2023–2025) ===
On June 20, 2023, he signed with CSKA Moscow of the VTB United League.

== National team career ==
In seven games at the 2018 Albert Schweitzer Tournament in Germany, Mikhailovskii averaged 17.3 points, 7.1 rebounds, and 1.7 steals per game for the Russian national under-18 team, who finished in fourth place, and made the All-Tournament Team.

Mikhailovskii was named to the All-Star Five at the 2018 FIBA Europe Under-18 Championship in Riga, Latvia after averaging 16.3 points, 7.4 rebounds and 2.1 assists per game and leading Russia to fourth place.

He played for the Russian under-19 team at the 2019 FIBA Under-19 World Cup in Heraklion, Greece. On 30 June 2019, Mikhailovskii recorded 20 points, 13 rebounds, and 12 assists in an 83–75 win over Greece. It was the first triple-double at the tournament since Dario Šarić in 2013.
