= Körfez Basket =

Turkish basketball team

Biotekno Körfez Basket
- Leagues: Basketbol Süper Ligi; Europe Cup
- Founded: 1994; 32 years ago
- History: Manisa Belediyespor; 1994–2014; Manisa Büyükşehir Basket Kulübü; 2014–2024; Manisa Basket; 2024–2026; Körfez Basket; 2026–present
- Arena: Şehit Polis Recep Topaloğlu Sports Hall
- Capacity: 5,000
- Location: Kocaeli, Turkey
- Team colors: Green, White and Black
- President: Vacant
- Head coach: Serhan Kavut
- Team captain: Matt Mitchell

Körfez Basket, mostly known as Biotekno Körfez Basket for sponsorship reasons, is a Turkish professional basketball club based in Kocaeli, that competes in the Turkish Basketbol Süper Ligi. The club was formerly known as Manisa Basket.

Körfez Basket qualified to participate in the Basketball Champions League qualifying round for the 2026-27 season.

== Players ==
=== Current roster ===
Note: Flags indicate national team eligibility at FIBA-sanctioned events. Players may hold other non-FIBA nationalities not displayed.

Biotekno Körfez Basket roster
Players
Coaches

Pos.	No.	Nat.	Name	Ht.	Wt.	Age
G	0	(United States)	Buie, Boo	1.88 m (6 ft 2 in)	82 kg (181 lb)	26 – 7 December 1999
SG	1	(United States)	Davis, Johnny	1.93 m (6 ft 4 in)	88 kg (194 lb)	24 – 27 February 2002
G/F	4	(Turkey)	Akay, Mert	1.95 m (6 ft 5 in)	82 kg (181 lb)	26 – 12 July 2000
PG	5	(Turkey)	Ekşioğlu, Mert Emre (injured)	1.88 m (6 ft 2 in)	85 kg (187 lb)	24 – 2 January 2002
G	10	(Turkey)	Akın, Berk Can	1.92 m (6 ft 4 in)	84 kg (185 lb)	21 – 19 September 2005
F	11	(United States)	Mitchell, Matt (C)	1.99 m (6 ft 6 in)	107 kg (236 lb)	27 – 18 March 1999
PF	12	(Turkey)	Demirtaş, Atahan	2.03 m (6 ft 8 in)	96 kg (212 lb)	26 – 16 June 2000
SG	15	(Turkey)	Sarıca, Efe	1.91 m (6 ft 3 in)	102 kg (225 lb)	23 – 11 November 2002
G/F	21	(Turkey)	Çamoğlu, Altan	1.98 m (6 ft 6 in)	79 kg (174 lb)	21 – 21 January 2005
C	22	(Australia)	Cluff, Oscar	2.11 m (6 ft 11 in)	116 kg (256 lb)	24 – 22 November 2001
F/C	65	(United States)	Reese, Alex	2.06 m (6 ft 9 in)	111 kg (245 lb)	27 – 21 May 1999
PF	77	(Lithuania)	Danusevičius, Paulius	2.06 m (6 ft 9 in)	105 kg (231 lb)	25 – 8 May 2001
F	88	(Serbia)	Barna, Filip	2.01 m (6 ft 7 in)	87 kg (192 lb)	26 – 5 December 1999

Head coach

- (Turkey) Serhan Kavut

Assistant coach(es)

- (Turkey) Şahin Ateşdağlı
- (Turkey) İlker Türel

Strength & conditioning coach(es)

- (Turkey) Yiğit Mızrap Canal

Team manager

- (Turkey) Özgün Önver

Legend

- (C) Team captain
- Injured

- Roster
Updated: September 18, 2026

=== Depth chart ===
Pos.	Starting 5	Bench 1	Bench 2	Inactive
C	Oscar Cluff*	Alex Reese*
PF	Filip Barna*	Paulius Danusevičius*	Atahan Demirtaş
SF	Matt Mitchell*	Mert Akay
SG	Altan Çamoğlu	Efe Sarıca	Johnny Davis*
PG	Boo Buie*	Berk Can Akın		Mert Emre Ekşioğlu (injured)

- BSL requires a maximum of 7 registered foreign players per squad, with no more than 4 foreign players allowed on the court at any given time. Crucially, at least 1 Turkish player must remain on the floor during every second of game play. Foreign players are shown with an asterisk (*).

=== Notable players ===
Note: Flags indicate national team eligibility at FIBA-sanctioned events. Players may hold other non-FIBA nationalities not displayed.

Criteria

To appear in this section a player must have either:

- Set a club record or won an individual award while at the club
- Played at least one official international match for their national team at any time
- Played at least one official NBA match at any time.

- (Turkey) Ege Arar
- (Turkey) İlkan Karaman
- (Turkey) Mehmet Yağmur
- (Brazil) Mãozinha Pereira
- (Bosnia and Herzegovina) John Roberson
- (Poland) Michal Michalak
- (Lithuania) Martynas Echodas
- (Lithuania) Kristupas Žemaitis
- (Mexico) Francisco Cruz
- (South Sudan) Jo Lual-Acuil
- (United States) James Anderson
- (United States) Troy Brown Jr.
- (United States) Chris Chiozza
- (United States) Javon Freeman-Liberty
- (United States) Saben Lee
- (United States) Isaiah Mobley
- (United States) Jamorko Pickett
- (United States) Jay Scrubb
- (United States) Wayne Selden Jr.
- (United States) Emanuel Terry
- (United States) Brodric Thomas

== Coaches ==
- (Turkey) Ceyhun Cabadak: 2018–2023
- (Turkey) Ahmet Kandemir: 2023–2024
- (Lithuania) Kazys Maksvytis: 2024–2025
- (Serbia) Oliver Kostić: 2025
- (Turkey) Serhan Kavut: 2025–present

== Season by season ==
Season	Tier	Division	Pos.	Pos.	W–L	Cup Competitions	European Competitions	
2018–19	2	TBL	10th	–	13–17			
2019–20	2	TBL	–^{1}	–	11–13^{1}			
2020–21	2	TBL	14th	–	10–20			
2021–22	2	TBL	Champions	–	23–7			
2022–23	1	BSL	11th		12–18			
2023–24	1	BSL	6th	QF	16–14	Quarterfinalist	FIBA Europe Cup	2R
2024–25	1	BSL	13th		11–19		Champions League	R16
2025–26	1	BSL	11th		11–19			

^1 Cancelled due to the COVID-19 pandemic in Europe.

== Trophies and awards ==
=== Trophies ===
- Turkish Basketball First League: (1)
  - 2021–22
