= Jan Palokaj =

Kosovan basketball player

No. 0 – Cibona
- Position: Shooting guard

Personal information
- Born: 5 November 2000 (age 26) Zagreb, Croatia
- Listed height: 1.88 m (6 ft 2 in)

Career information
- Playing career: 2016–present

Career history
- 2016–2018: Zagreb
- 2018–2019: Bosco
- 2019–2021: Zadar
- 2021–2023: Prishtina
- 2023–2025: Ylli
- 2025: Bashkimi
- 2025–present: Cibona

Career highlights
- Kosovo Supercup winner (2022); 2× Croatian League champion (2021, 2026); 2× Croatian Cup winner (2020, 2021)
Medals
Men's basketball
Representing Croatia
FIBA U18 European Championship
Gold medal – first place	2017 Estonia (Division B)	Under-18

Jan Palokaj (born 5 November 2000) is a Kosovan professional basketball player who currently plays for Cibona.

== Professional career ==
=== Ylli (2023–2025) ===
On September 9, 2023, Palokaj signed for Golden Eagle Ylli of the Kosovo Superleague and Liga Unike.

=== Bashkimi (2025) ===
On August 29, 2025, he signed for Bashkimi of the Kosovo Superleague.

=== Cibona (2025–present) ===
In November, 2025, Palokaj signed for Cibona of the Premijer liga.

== International career ==
From 2016, until 2019, Palokaj has been part of Croatia at youth international level, respectively has been part of the U16, U18 and U20 teams. He also played in the 2016 FIBA U16 European Championship, 2017 FIBA U18 European Championship Division B and 2018 FIBA U18 European Championship.

On 25 January 2022, Prishtina announced that Palokaj and his teammate Jetmir Zeqiri have been provided with a Kosovo passport and have the right to play for the Kosovo national team.

He received his first call-up for the Kosovo national team in February 2024 but was unable to play due to an injury.

== Personal life ==
Palokaj was born in Zagreb to an ethnic Albanian father from Gjurakoc.
