= VTB United League Young Player of the Year =

The VTB United League Young Player of the Year is an annual VTB United League award given since the 2012–13 VTB United League season to the league's best young player. Players who are under age 23 are eligible.

== Winners ==
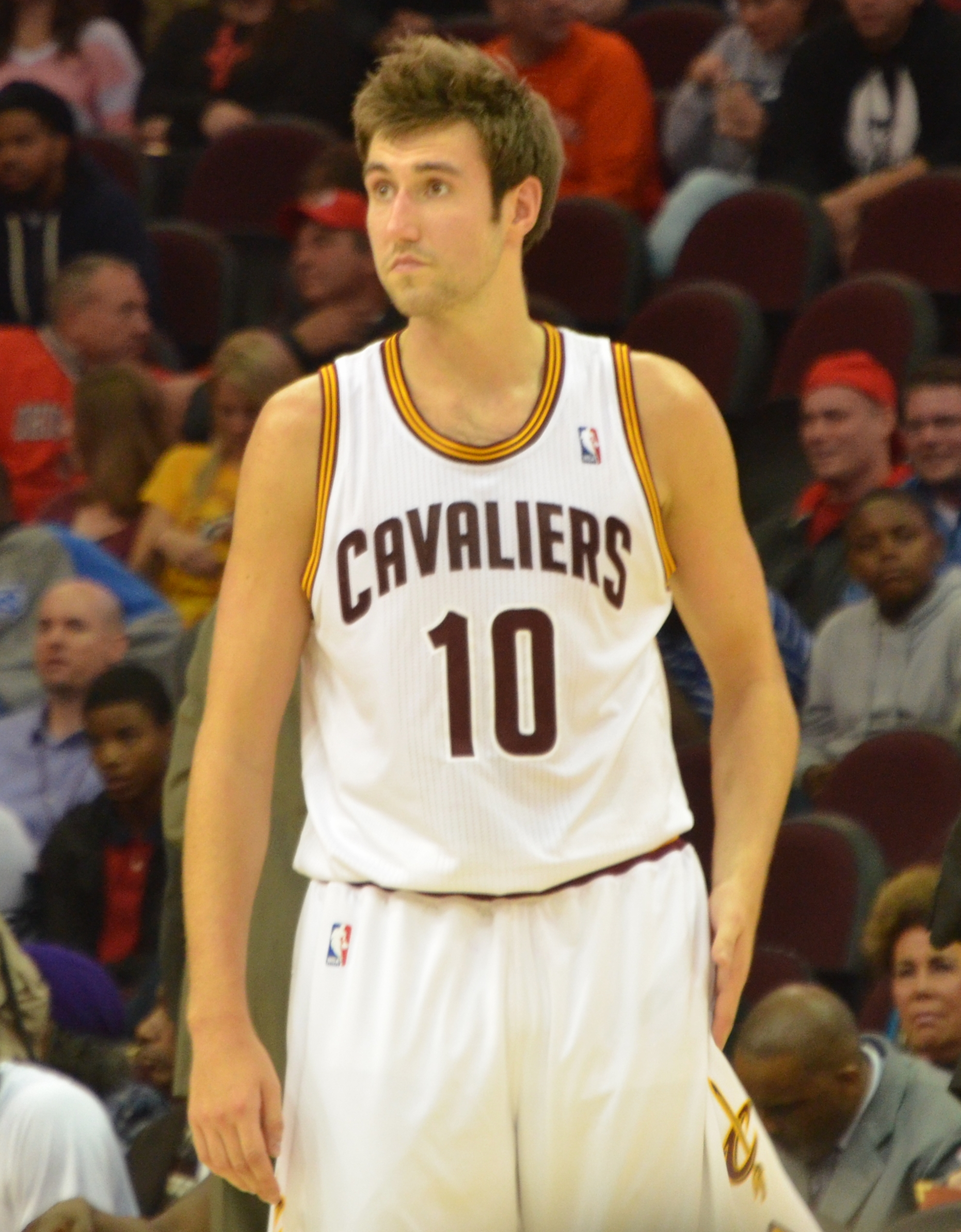
Sergey Karasev won the first award in 2013.

Season	Pos.	Player	Club	Ref
2012–13	SF	(Russia) Sergey Karasev	(Russia) Triumph Lyubertsy	
2013–14	SG	(Russia) Dmitry Kulagin	(Russia) Triumph Lyubertsy	
2013–14	SF	(Lithuania) Edgaras Ulanovas	(Lithuania) Neptūnas	
2014–15	SF	(Latvia) Jānis Timma	(Latvia) VEF Rīga	
2015–16	C	(Russia) Artem Klimenko	(Russia) Avtodor Saratov	
2016–17	G/F	(Russia) Ivan Ukhov	(Russia) Parma	
2017–18	G	(United States) Isaiah Briscoe	(Estonia) Kalev/Cramo	
2018–19	SG	(Russia) Nikita Mikhailovsky	(Russia) Avtodor Saratov	
2019–20	Not awarded ^{1}			
2020–21	SG	(Russia) Nikita Mikhailovsky (2)	(Russia) Avtodor Saratov	
2021–22	PF	(Russia) Andrey Martyuk	(Russia) Lokomotiv Kuban	
2022–23	PF	(Russia) Andrey Martyuk (2)	(Russia) Lokomotiv Kuban	
2023–24	C	(Russia) Kirill Elatontsev	(Russia) Lokomotiv Kuban	
2024–25	C	(Russia) Kirill Elatontsev (2)	(Russia) Lokomotiv Kuban	
2025–26	SF	(Russia) Vsevolod Ishchenko	(Russia) Lokomotiv Kuban	

^1 There was no awarding in the 2019–20, because the season was cancelled due to the coronavirus pandemic in Europe.
