= VTB United League Sixth Man of the Year =

The VTB United League Sixth Man of the Year is an annual VTB United League award given since the 2013–14 VTB United League season to the league's most valuable player for his team coming off the bench as a substitute (or sixth man).

== Winners ==
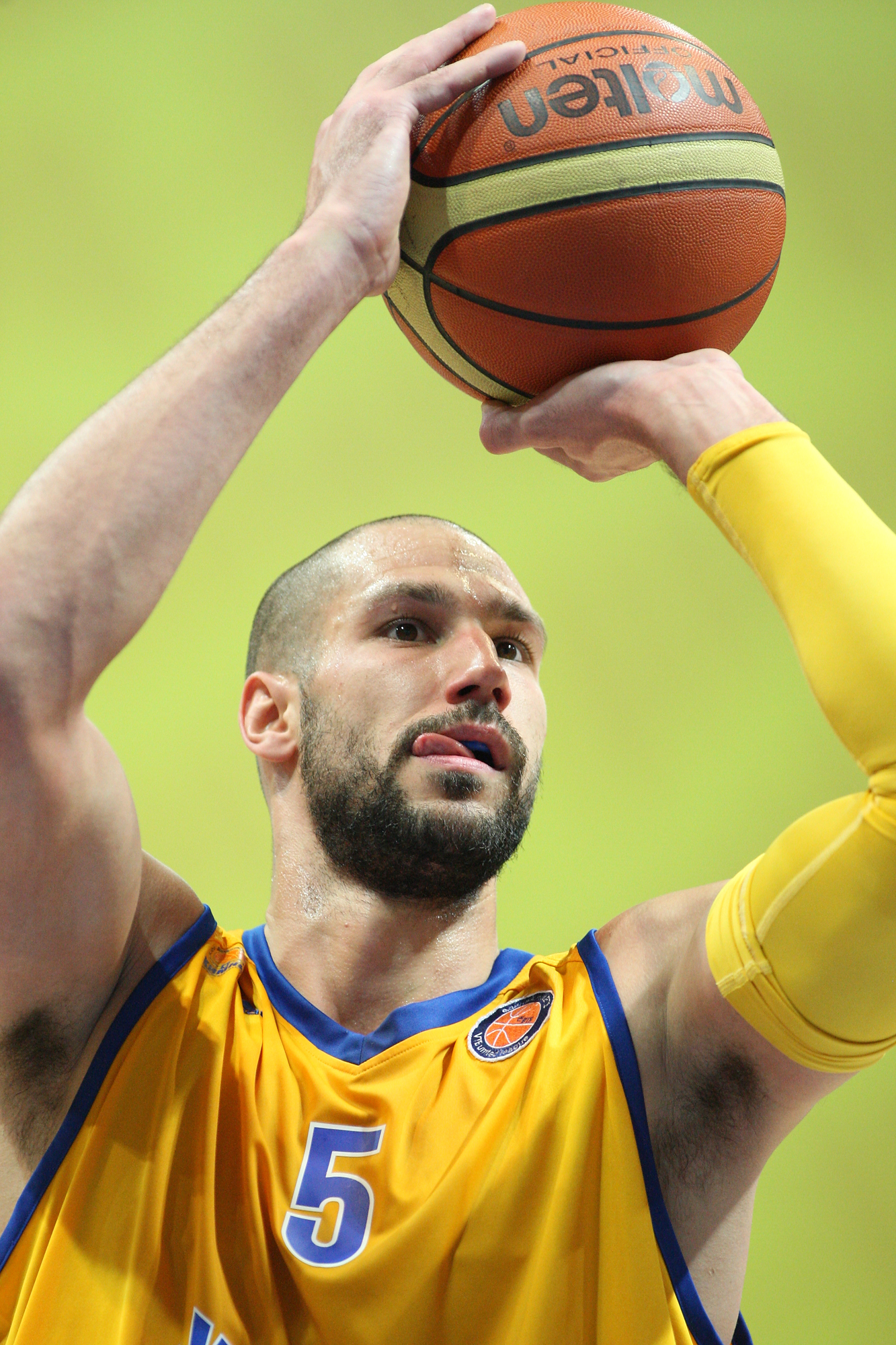
James Augustine of Khimki, won the first title in 2014.

Season	Player	Pos.	Nationality	Team	Ref(s)
2013–14	James Augustine	C	United States	Khimki (Russia)	
2014–15	Petteri Koponen	SG	Finland	Khimki (Russia)	
2015–16	Quino Colom	PG	Spain	UNICS (Russia)	
2016–17	Suleiman Braimoh	PF	Nigeria	Enisey (Russia)	
2017–18	Jamar Smith	G	United States	UNICS (Russia)	
2018–19	Dorell Wright	SF	United States	Lokomotiv Kuban (Russia)	
2019–20	Not awarded ^{1}				
2020–21	Rolands Freimanis	PF	Latvia	Zastal Zielona Góra (Poland)	
2021–22	Billy Baron	G	United States	Zenit Saint Petersburg (Russia)	
2022–23	Jalen Reynolds	C	United States	UNICS (Russia)	
2023–24	Melo Trimble	PG	United States	CSKA Moscow (Russia)	
2024–25	Marcos Knight	G	United States	UNICS (Russia)	

Notes:

^1 There was no awarding in the 2019–20, because the season was cancelled due to the coronavirus pandemic in Europe.
