= VTB United League Coach of the Year =

The VTB United League Coach of the Year is an annual VTB United League award given since the 2013–14 VTB United League season to the league's best coach. The award is handed out after the regular season.

== Winners ==
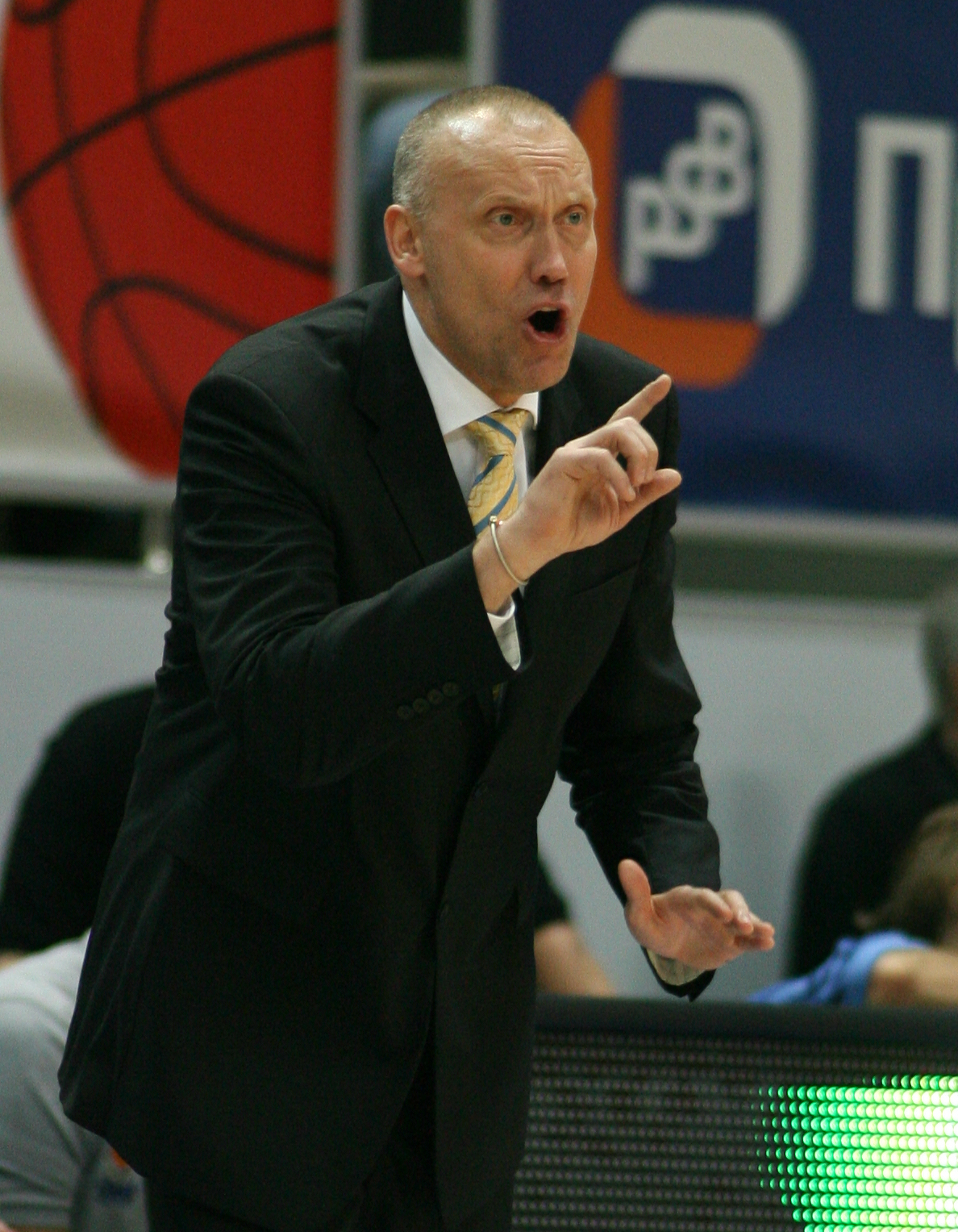
Rimas Kurtinaitis won the first award in 2014.

Season	Coach	Nationality	Team	Ref(s)
2013–14	Rimas Kurtinaitis	Lithuania	Khimki (Russia)	
2014–15	Dimitrios Itoudis	Greece	CSKA Moscow (Russia)	
2015–16	Vasily Karasev	Russia	Zenit	
2016–17	Dimitrios Itoudis (2)	Greece	CSKA Moscow (Russia)	
2017–18	Dimitrios Itoudis (3)	Greece	CSKA Moscow (Russia)	
2018–19	Emil Rajković	North Macedonia	Astana (Kazakhstan)	
2019–20	Not awarded ^{1}			
2020–21	Xavi Pascual	Spain	Zenit (Russia)	
2021–22	Dimitrios Itoudis (4)	Greece	CSKA Moscow (Russia)	
2022–23	Emil Rajković (2)	North Macedonia	CSKA Moscow (Russia)	
2023–24	Velimir Perasovic	Croatia	UNICS (Russia)	
2024–25	Xavi Pascual (2)	Spain	Zenit (Russia)	

Notes:

^1 There was no awarding in the 2019–20, because the season was cancelled due to the coronavirus pandemic in Europe.
