= 2020–21 VTB United League =

Russian first tier basketball season

VTB United League
- Season: 2020–21
- Duration: 20 September 2020 – 11 June 2021
- Teams: 13

Regular season
- Season MVP: (Lithuania) Mantas Kalnietis

Finals
- Champions: (Russia) CSKA Moscow (11th title)
- Runners-up: (Russia) UNICS
- Semi-finalists: (Russia) Zenit Saint Petersburg (Russia) Lokomotiv Kuban
- Playoffs MVP: (Italy) Daniel Hackett

The 2020–21 VTB United League was the 12th season of the VTB United League. It was the eighth season that the league functions as the Russian domestic first tier level.

== Teams ==
A total of 13 teams from five countries contested the league, including nine sides from Russia, one from Belarus, one from Estonia, one from Kazakhstan, and one from Poland.

=== Venues and locations ===
Locations of teams in the 2019–20 VTB United League

Team	Home city	Arena	Capacity
(Kazakhstan) Astana	Nur-Sultan	Arena Velotrack	9,270
(Russia) Avtodor	Saratov	DS Kristall	5,500
(Russia) CSKA Moscow	Moscow	USC CSKA	5,000
(Russia) Enisey	Krasnoyarsk	Arena.Sever	4,000
(Estonia) Kalev/Cramo	Tallinn	Saku Suurhall	5,500
(Russia) Khimki	Khimki	BCMO	4,000
(Russia) Lokomotiv Kuban	Krasnodar	Basket-Hall	7,500
(Russia) Nizhny Novgorod	Nizhny Novgorod	Trade Union Sport Palace	5,500
(Russia) Parma	Perm	UDS Molot	7,000
(Belarus) Tsmoki Minsk	Minsk	Minsk-Arena	15,000
(Russia) UNICS	Kazan	Basket-Hall	7,000
(Russia) Zenit	Saint Petersburg	Sibur Arena	6,381
(Poland) Zielona Góra	Zielona Góra	CRS Hall Zielona Góra	6,080

== Regular season ==
In the regular season, teams play against each other twice (home-and-away) in a round-robin format.

=== Standings ===
Pos	Team	Pld	W	L	PF	PA	PD	PCT	Qualification or relegation
1	(Russia) Zenit Saint Petersburg	24	20	4	2010	1718	+292	.833	Advance to playoffs
2	(Russia) Lokomotiv Kuban	24	18	6	2138	1943	+195	.750	Advance to playoffs
3	(Russia) UNICS	24	18	6	1962	1794	+168	.750	Advance to playoffs
4	(Russia) CSKA Moscow	24	17	7	2219	1861	+358	.708	Advance to playoffs
5	(Russia) Nizhny Novgorod	24	14	10	1914	1921	−7	.583	Advance to playoffs
6	(Poland) Zielona Góra	24	13	11	2094	2075	+19	.542	Advance to playoffs
7	(Russia) Khimki	24	12	12	2028	1962	+66	.500	Advance to playoffs
8	(Russia) Parma	24	10	14	1878	1925	−47	.417	Advance to playoffs
9	(Russia) Avtodor	24	10	14	2019	2092	−73	.417	
10	(Estonia) Kalev/Cramo	24	9	15	1821	1998	−177	.375	
11	(Russia) Enisey	24	6	18	1866	2093	−227	.250	
12	(Kazakhstan) Astana	24	6	18	1843	2101	−258	.250	
13	(Belarus) Tsmoki Minsk	24	3	21	1747	2056	−309	.125	

Source: VTB League

=== Results ===
Home \ Away	AST	AVT	CSK	ENI	KAL	KHI	LOK	NIZ	PAR	TSM	UNI	ZEN	ZGA
Astana	—	83–92	60–93	60–78	61–77	77–82	86–82	69–79	80–84	74–109	74–87	70–77	88–82
Avtodor	107–85	—	82–98	85–79	87–61	85–82	89–85	93–99	70–93	113–66	97–110	62–89	90–91
CSKA Moscow	100–77	100–66	—	109–60	102–107	92–73	94–80	85–84	95–97	101–67	102–86	71–74	105–73
Enisey	77–76	86–85	80–91	—	89–94	77–92	79–106	86–96	52–86	81–86	77–84	67–85	73–94
Kalev/Cramo	85–92	85–77	72–94	75–86	—	91–84	94–105	86–84	72–85	88–82	49–76	51–87	79–86
Khimki	88–89	80–84	86–78	89–83	92–74	—	90–92	64–69	103–83	89–65	87–93	67–79	94–99
Lokomotiv Kuban	90–84	104–89	103–94	100–98	20–0	91–102	—	73–64	85–68	77–76	93–81	96–81	83–76
Nizhny Novgorod	75–73	86–80	63–83	83–79	95–85	96–85	73–94	—	88–73	78–57	66–91	62–70	100–93
Parma	83–84	93–100	61–95	67–84	80–72	69–72	84–81	67–72	—	74–65	69–76	78–76	79–85
Tsmoki Minsk	78–80	69–86	60–87	74–81	72–80	65–81	75–101	77–76	65–78	—	66–76	73–99	75–80
UNICS	101–83	94–65	76–83	75–64	83–66	83–76	77–98	87–56	69–51	83–77	—	59–58	65–64
Zenit Saint Petersburg	85–52	97–71	81–77	84–71	91–83	78–81	90–85	78–73	89–84	104–73	81–64	—	83–74
Zielona Góra	110–86	77–64	93–90	117–79	88–95	70–89	99–114	93–97	95–92	89–75	92–86	74–94	—

Source: VTB United League
Legend: Blue = home team win; Red = away team win.

== Playoffs ==
Quarterfinals were played in a best-of-three format (1-1-1). Semifinals and finals were played in a best-of-five format (2-2-1).

=== Bracket ===
Quarter-finals
1	(Russia) Zenit Saint Petersburg	2
8	(Russia) Parma	0
4	(Russia) CSKA Moscow	2
5	(Russia) Nizhny Novgorod	1
2	(Russia) Lokomotiv Kuban	2
7	(Russia) Khimki	0
3	(Russia) UNICS	2
6	(Poland) Zielona Góra	0

Semi-finals
1	(Russia) Zenit Saint Petersburg	1
4	(Russia) CSKA Moscow	3
2	(Russia) Lokomotiv Kuban	0
3	(Russia) UNICS	3

Finals
3	(Russia) UNICS	0
4	(Russia) CSKA Moscow	3

=== Quarterfinals ===
Team 1	Series	Team 2	Game 1	Game 2	Game 3
Zenit Saint Petersburg (Russia)	2–0	(Russia) Parma	86–66	98–62	–
Lokomotiv Kuban (Russia)	2–0	(Russia) Khimki	89–80	92–85	–
UNICS (Russia)	2–0	(Poland) Zielona Góra	87–60	90–79	–
CSKA Moscow (Russia)	2–1	(Russia) Nizhny Novgorod	84–59	72–76	79–75

=== Semifinals ===
Team 1	Series	Team 2	Game 1	Game 2	Game 3	Game 4	Game 5
Zenit Saint Petersburg (Russia)	1–3	(Russia) CSKA Moscow	73–78	107–104 OT	82–96	71–85	–
Lokomotiv Kuban (Russia)	0–3	(Russia) UNICS	87–98 OT	69–79	70–74	–	–

=== Finals ===
Team 1	Series	Team 2	Game 1	Game 2	Game 3	Game 4	Game 5
UNICS (Russia)	0–3	(Russia) CSKA Moscow	77–85	57–76	81–89	–	–

== VTB League teams in European competitions ==
Team	Competition	Progress
CSKA Moscow	EuroLeague	4th place
Khimki	EuroLeague	Regular season
Zenit Saint Petersburg	EuroLeague	Quarterfinals
Lokomotiv Kuban	EuroCup	Quarterfinals
UNICS	EuroCup	Runner-up
Nizhny Novgorod	Champions League	Quarterfinals
Tsmoki-Minsk	Champions League	Regular season
Parma	FIBA Europe Cup	4th place

== Awards ==
=== Season awards ===
Award	Player	Team	Ref.
Regular Season MVP	(Lithuania) Mantas Kalnietis	(Russia) Lokomotiv Kuban	
Playoffs MVP	(Italy) Daniel Hackett	(Russia) CSKA Moscow	
Scoring Champion	(United States) Marcus Keene	(Estonia) Kalev/Cramo	
Young Player of the Year	(Russia) Nikita Mikhailovsky	(Russia) Avtodor Saratov	
Coach of the Year	(Spain) Xavi Pascual	(Russia) Zenit	
Performance of the Season	(Russia) Anton Astapkovich	(Russia) Nizhny Novgorod	
Sixth Man of the Year	(Latvia) Rolands Freimanis	(Poland) Zastal Zielona Góra	
Defensive Player of the Year	(United States) John Brown	(Russia) UNICS	
Newcomer of the Year	(Denmark) Gabriel Lundberg	(Poland) Zastal Zielona Góra	
First Team	(Lithuania) Mantas Kalnietis	(Russia) Lokomotiv Kuban	
First Team	(United States) Mike James	(Russia) CSKA Moscow	
First Team	(United States) Marcus Keene	(Estonia) Kalev/Cramo	
First Team	(Latvia) Rolands Freimanis	(Poland) Zastal Zielona Góra	
First Team	(United States) Jordan Mickey	(Russia) Khimki	
Second Team	(Russia) Alexey Shved	(Russia) CSKA Moscow	
Second Team	(Canada) Kevin Pangos	(Russia) Zenit	
Second Team	(United States) Will Clyburn	(Russia) CSKA Moscow	
Second Team	(Lithuania) Mindaugas Kuzminskas	(Russia) Lokomotiv Kuban	
Second Team	(United States) Geoffrey Groselle	(Poland) Zastal Zielona Góra	

=== MVP of the Month ===
Month	Player	Team	Ref.
2020
September/October	(United States) Billy Baron	(Russia) Zenit Saint Petersburg	
November	(United States) Alan Williams	(Russia) Lokomotiv Kuban	
December	(Denmark) Gabriel Lundberg	(Poland) Zielona Góra	
2021
January	(United States) Jamar Smith	(Russia) UNICS	
February	(United States) Drew Gordon	(Russia) Lokomotiv Kuban	
March	(Germany) Johannes Voigtmann	(Russia) CSKA Moscow	
April	(United States) Marcus Keene	(Estonia) Kalev/Cramo	
