= Jalen Reynolds =

American basketball player (born 1992)

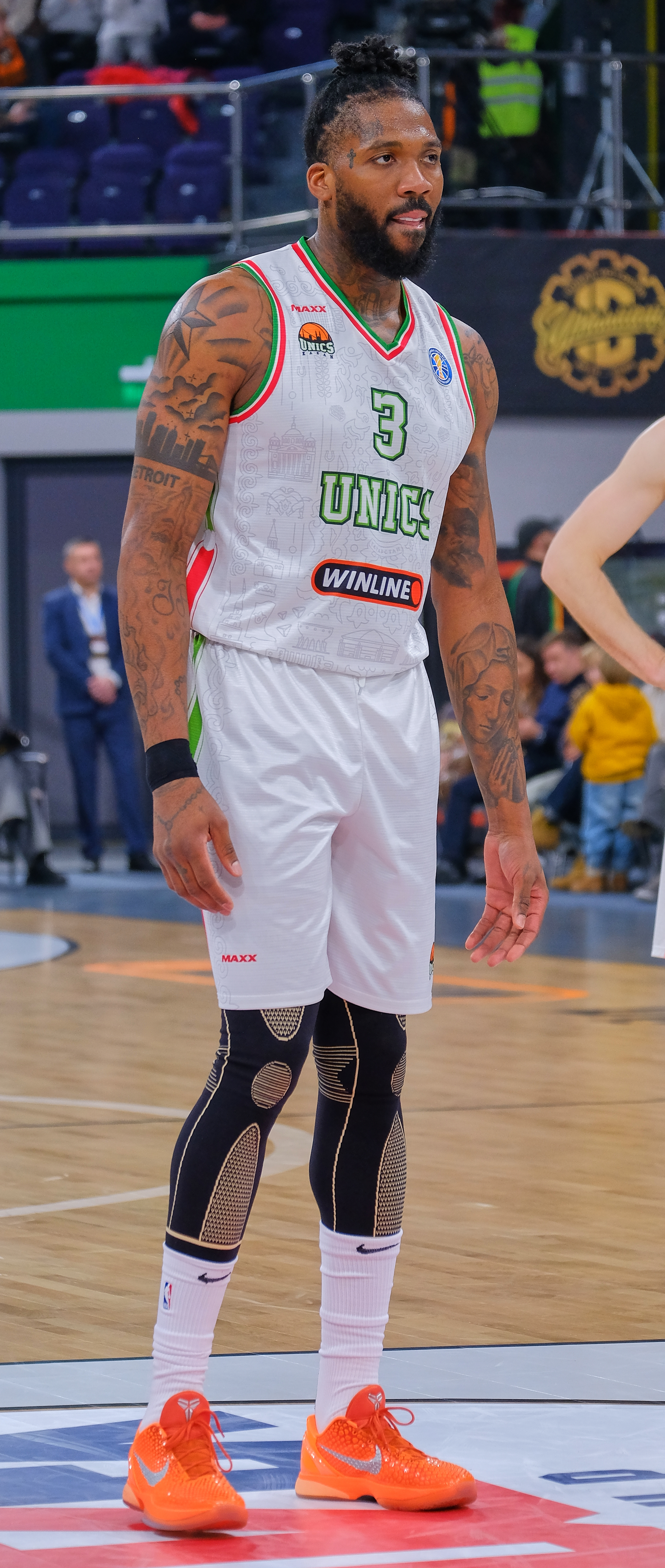
- Reynolds with UNICS Kazan in 2025

No. 3 – BC UNICS
- Position: Center
- League: VTB United League

Personal information
- Born: December 30, 1992 (age 33) Detroit, Michigan, U.S.
- Listed height: 6 ft 10 in (2.08 m)
- Listed weight: 250 lb (113 kg)

Career information
- High school: Brewster Academy (Wolfeboro, New Hampshire)
- College: Xavier (2012–2016)
- NBA draft: 2016: undrafted
- Playing career: 2016–present

Career history
- 2016–2017: Recanati
- 2017–2018: Reggiana
- 2018: FC Barcelona
- 2018–2019: Zenit Saint Petersburg
- 2019: Zhejiang Lions
- 2019: Stockton Kings
- 2019–2020: Maccabi Tel Aviv
- 2020–2021: Bayern Munich
- 2021–2022: Maccabi Tel Aviv
- 2022–present: UNICS Kazan

Career highlights
- EuroCup rebounding leader (2019); VTB United League champion (2023); VTB United League rebounding leader (2019); All-VTB United League First Team (2019); 2× VTB United League Sixth Man of the Year (2023, 2026)

Jalen Reynolds (born December 30, 1992) is an American professional basketball player for UNICS Kazan of the VTB United League. He played college basketball for Xavier University before playing professionally in Italy, Spain, Russia, China and Israel.

== College career ==
Reynolds enrolled at Xavier University in 2012, after graduating from Brewster Academy. After being ruled ineligible, he sat out the 2012-13 season.

He was suspended indefinitely by Xavier in January 2014.

Statistically, his best year was in 2014-15, his sophomore season, when Reynolds averaged 9.9 points and 6.1 rebounds a contest. He received Big East All-Tournament Team honors that year. In March 2015, a complaint was filed against him by another student, Reynolds was cleared in the matter in May. After averaging 9.6 points and 6.5 rebounds a game in the 2015-16 season, Reynolds declared for the 2016 NBA draft, but went undrafted.

== Professional career ==
After going undrafted in the 2016 NBA draft, in August 2016, he signed his first professional contract with Basket Recanati of the Italian second-tier Serie A2. He appeared in 18 games for the team, averaging 18.2 points and 7.9 rebounds per outing.

In January 2017, he transferred to Pallacanestro Reggiana of Italy’s top-flight Lega Basket Serie A.

In May 2018, he signed with FC Barcelona Lassa for the remainder of the season. On July 4, 2018, he signed a one-year deal with Zenit Saint Petersburg of the VTB United League.

On August 19, 2019, he signed with Zhejiang Lions of the Chinese Basketball Association (CBA). On December 6, 2019, the Stockton Kings announced that they had acquired Reynolds off waivers.

On December 28, 2019, he signed with Maccabi Tel Aviv of the Israeli Premier League as an injury cover for Tarik Black. On January 9, 2020, Reynolds scored 17 points in his second EuroLeague game with Maccabi, while also recording seven rebounds in a 95–89 win over Alba Berlin. Reynolds parted ways with the team on May 7, 2020.

On July 31, 2020, he signed with German club Bayern Munich of the Basketball Bundesliga (BBL).

On June 24, 2021, Reynolds made his official return to Maccabi Tel Aviv on a two-year contract with an option for a third.

On July 15, 2022, Reynolds signed with Russian club UNICS Kazan of the VTB United League. He averaged 13.6 points and 5.5 rebounds per game. On June 21, 2023, he renewed his contract with UNICS for another season.

== The Basketball Tournament ==
In the summer of 2017, Reynolds played in The Basketball Tournament on ESPN for team Armored Athlete. He competed for the $2 million prize, and for team Armored Athlete, he averaged 12.8 points per game, also shooting 79 percent behind the free-throw line. Reynolds helped take team Armored Athlete to the West Regional Championship, where they lost to Team Challenge ALS 75-63.
