= 2022–23 VTB United League =

VTB United League
- Season: 2022–23
- Duration: 2 October 2022 – 20 January 2023 (First stage); 28 January – 26 March 2023 (Second stage); 31 March – 16 May 2023 (Playoffs)
- Teams: 12

Regular season
- Season MVP: (Serbia) Nikola Milutinov

Finals
- Champions: (Russia) UNICS
- Runners-up: (Russia) Lokomotiv-Kuban
- Third place: (Russia) CSKA Moscow
- Fourth place: (Russia) Zenit Saint Petersburg
- Playoffs MVP: (North Macedonia) Nenad Dimitrijević

Records
- Biggest home win: UNICS 109–54 Astana (16 October 2022)
- Biggest away win: Astana 51–99 Samara (4 January 2023)
- Highest scoring: UNICS 112–104 (OT) CSKA Moscow (15 February 2023)
- Highest attendance: 9,727; MINSK 70–92 Lokomotiv-Kuban (20 November 2022)
- Lowest attendance: 334; Astana 84–72 PARMA-PARI (13 October 2022)
- ^{1} Sponsored league name, referring to VTB Bank.

The 2022–23 VTB United League was the 14th season of the VTB United League. It was the 10th season that the league functions as the Russian domestic top tier level. It started on 2 October 2022 with the regular season and ended on 16 May 2023 with the finals.

Zenit Saint Petersburg was the defending champion.

== Format changes ==
For this season, the regular season will be divided into two phases since none team will participate in European competitions due to the Russian invasion of Ukraine. At the first phase, 12 teams will play two rounds, after which the teams will be divided into two groups: Group A with top six teams from first phase and Group B with last six teams from first phase. At the second phase, the teams will play among themselves in their groups for two more rounds. For the playoffs, all series will be played in best-of-seven playoffs, except for the quarterfinals that will be played in best-of-five playoffs.

== Teams ==
A total of 12 teams contested the league, including 10 sides from the 2021–22 season (eight Russian teams, one Belarusian team and one Kazakhstani team) and two newly-joined Russian sides (Samara and MBA Moscow). Other two Russian sides (Uralmash Ekaterinburg and Runa Moscow) also applied to participate, but they did not fulfill the requirements to join the league.

=== Venues and locations ===
Locations of teams in the 2022–23 VTB United League

Team	Home city	Arena	Capacity
(Kazakhstan Basketball Federation) Astana	Astana	Arena Velotrack	9,270
(Russian Basketball Federation) Avtodor	Saratov	DS Kristall	5,500
(Russian Basketball Federation) CSKA Moscow	Moscow	Megasport Arena	13,344
(Russian Basketball Federation) Enisey	Krasnoyarsk	Arena.Sever	4,000
(Russian Basketball Federation) Lokomotiv-Kuban	Krasnodar	Basket-Hall	7,500
(Russian Basketball Federation) MBA Moscow	Moscow	Basket Hall Moscow	5,000
(Belarusian Basketball Federation) BC Minsk	Minsk	Falcon Club Arena	
(Belarusian Basketball Federation) BC Minsk	Minsk	Minsk-Arena	15,000
(Russian Basketball Federation) Nizhny Novgorod	Nizhny Novgorod	Trade Union Sport Palace	5,500
(Russian Basketball Federation) PARMA-PARI	Perm	UDS Molot	7,000
(Russian Basketball Federation) Samara	Samara	Ice Sports Palace	5,000
(Russian Basketball Federation) UNICS	Kazan	Basket-Hall	7,000
(Russian Basketball Federation) Zenit Saint Petersburg	Saint Petersburg	Sibur Arena	6,381

== First stage ==
=== Standings ===
Pos	Team	Pld	W	L	PF	PA	PD	Pts	Qualification
1	(Russian Basketball Federation) CSKA Moscow	22	22	0	2165	1633	+532	44	Qualification to Group A
2	(Russian Basketball Federation) UNICS	22	20	2	1927	1583	+344	42	Qualification to Group A
3	(Russian Basketball Federation) Zenit Saint Petersburg	22	16	6	1816	1563	+253	38	Qualification to Group A
4	(Russian Basketball Federation) Pari Nizhny Novgorod	22	13	9	1659	1647	+12	35	Qualification to Group A
5	(Russian Basketball Federation) MBA Moscow	22	13	9	1743	1705	+38	35	Qualification to Group A
6	(Russian Basketball Federation) Lokomotiv-Kuban	22	12	10	1724	1689	+35	34	Qualification to Group A
7	(Russian Basketball Federation) Samara	22	9	13	1706	1688	+18	31	Qualification to Group B
8	(Russian Basketball Federation) PARMA-PARI	22	9	13	1735	1800	−65	31	Qualification to Group B
9	(Russian Basketball Federation) Avtodor	22	7	15	1751	1841	−90	29	Qualification to Group B
10	(Russian Basketball Federation) Enisey	22	6	16	1623	1772	−149	28	Qualification to Group B
11	(Kazakhstan Basketball Federation) Astana	22	4	18	1434	1902	−468	26	Qualification to Group B
12	(Belarusian Basketball Federation) MINSK	22	1	21	1338	1798	−460	23	Qualification to Group B

Source: VTB United League

=== Results ===
Home \ Away	AST	AVT	CSK	ENI	LOK	MBA	MIN	NIZ	PAR	SAM	UNI	ZEN
Astana	—	70–69	64–101	57–88	67–98	69–103	77–48	60–80	84–72	51–99	41–79	75–93
Avtodor	94–72	—	75–102	86–81	84–100	72–68	88–77	69–71	94–95	74–69	71–83	91–79
CSKA Moscow	100–72	103–76	—	102–66	94–80	110–78	107–63	107–63	109–71	95–82	92–79	100–80
Enisey	89–76	88–84	81–109	—	69–71	85–80	61–63	82–90	74–76	72–65	79–89	61–89
Lokomotiv-Kuban	73–53	89–76	64–84	75–71	—	73–86	74–56	63–73	88–86	79–70	70–82	62–68
MBA Moscow	81–59	85–70	75–92	89–76	89–76	—	81–62	55–88	102–87	71–60	81–97	76–75
MINSK	65–76	72–97	66–101	36–54	70–92	61–76	—	57–68	48–77	68–80	54–58	66–91
Pari Nizhny Novgorod	86–59	74–69	79–109	73–67	93–79	80–87	84–67	—	78–73	52–90	57–75	67–72
PARMA-PARI	94–74	89–83	74–83	88–75	85–92	78–70	85–62	85–83	—	81–83	82–89	60–65
Samara	93–58	87–82	72–85	92–86	77–80	74–82	78–71	60–83	80–63	—	74–86	70–82
UNICS	109–54	95–76	93–95	104–59	83–75	74–66	102–53	86–71	93–74	94–86	—	95–94
Zenit Saint Petersburg	88–66	92–71	80–85	78–59	73–71	87–62	91–53	76–66	91–60	93–65	79–82	—

Source: VTB United League
Legend: Blue = home team win; Red = away team win.

== Second stage ==
=== Group A ===
Pos	Team	Pld	W	L	PF	PA	PD	Pts	Qualification	(Russian Basketball Federation) CSK	(Russian Basketball Federation) UNI	(Russian Basketball Federation) ZEN	(Russian Basketball Federation) NIZ	(Russian Basketball Federation) LOK	(Russian Basketball Federation) MBA
1	(Russian Basketball Federation) CSKA Moscow	32	30	2	3060	2417	+643	62	Qualification to playoffs	—	91–77	86–90	76–75	94–74	94–70
2	(Russian Basketball Federation) UNICS	32	24	8	2724	2406	+318	56	Qualification to playoffs	112–104	—	69–80	86–85	70–103	73–58
3	(Russian Basketball Federation) Zenit Saint Petersburg	32	23	9	2621	2313	+308	55	Qualification to playoffs	69–72	83–78	—	83–67	90–92	73–71
4	(Russian Basketball Federation) Pari Nizhny Novgorod	32	17	15	2392	2409	−17	49	Qualification to playoffs	70–89	78–68	79–70	—	75–70	55–69
5	(Russian Basketball Federation) Lokomotiv-Kuban	32	17	15	2523	2470	+53	49	Qualification to playoffs	66–98	78–70	74–77	80–82	—	73–65
6	(Russian Basketball Federation) MBA Moscow	32	15	17	2413	2504	−91	47	Qualification to playoffs	81–91	63–94	62–90	71–67	60–89	—

Source: VTB United League

=== Group B ===
Pos	Team	Pld	W	L	PF	PA	PD	Pts	Qualification	(Russian Basketball Federation) PAR	(Russian Basketball Federation) AVT	(Russian Basketball Federation) ENI	(Russian Basketball Federation) SAM	(Kazakhstan Basketball Federation) AST	(Belarusian Basketball Federation) MIN
1	(Russian Basketball Federation) PARMA-PARI	32	16	16	2498	2530	−32	48	Qualification to playoffs	—	83–91	79–78	72–67	94–59	82–67
2	(Russian Basketball Federation) Avtodor	32	15	17	2553	2598	−45	47	Qualification to playoffs	85–59	—	58–73	93–83	79–70	78–70
3	(Russian Basketball Federation) Enisey	32	14	18	2394	2445	−51	46		81–76	82–86	—	79–74	77–67	75–55
4	(Russian Basketball Federation) Samara	32	13	19	2514	2452	+62	45		74–77	83–87	69–74	—	89–75	90–56
5	(Kazakhstan Basketball Federation) Astana	32	5	27	2146	2736	−590	37		73–74	73–80	67–83	73–92	—	86–82
6	(Belarusian Basketball Federation) MINSK	32	3	29	2008	2566	−558	35		55–67	81–65	42–69	78–87	84–69	—

Source: VTB United League

== Playoffs ==
Quarterfinals
2	(Russian Basketball Federation) UNICS	101	94	73	—	—	3
7	(Russian Basketball Federation) PARMA-PARI	76	59	52	—	—	0
3	(Russian Basketball Federation) Zenit Saint Petersburg	61	87	86	99	—	3
6	(Russian Basketball Federation) MBA Moscow	65	60	61	80	—	1
1	(Russian Basketball Federation) CSKA Moscow	103	111	76	—	—	3
8	(Russian Basketball Federation) Avtodor	68	85	67	—	—	0
4	(Russian Basketball Federation) Pari Nizhny Novgorod	81	72	81	—	—	0
5	(Russian Basketball Federation) Lokomotiv-Kuban	93	77	92	—	—	3

Semifinals
2	(Russian Basketball Federation) UNICS	94	68	71	77	78	80	80	4
3	(Russian Basketball Federation) Zenit Saint Petersburg	67	59	83	104	63	82	79	3
1	(Russian Basketball Federation) CSKA Moscow	87	83	81	79	68	98	100	3
5	(Russian Basketball Federation) Lokomotiv-Kuban	84	84	84	73	85	75	103	4

Finals
2	(Russian Basketball Federation) UNICS	76	79	82	90	98	—	—	4
5	(Russian Basketball Federation) Lokomotiv-Kuban	88	76	81	88	89	—	—	1
Third place
1	(Russian Basketball Federation) CSKA Moscow	66	85	71	77	82	—	—	4
3	(Russian Basketball Federation) Zenit Saint Petersburg	86	61	60	72	79	—	—	1

Source: VTB United League

== VTB League teams in continental competitions ==
Team	Competition	Progress
Astana	West Asia Super League	3rd place

== Awards ==
Award	Player	Team	Ref.
Regular Season MVP	(Serbia) Nikola Milutinov	(Russia) CSKA Moscow	
Playoffs MVP	(North Macedonia) Nenad Dimitrijević	(Russia) UNICS	
Scoring Champion	(United States) Malik Newman	(Russia) Avtodor	
Young Player of the Year	(Russia) Andrey Martiuk	(Russia) Lokomotiv-Kuban	
Coach of the Year	(North Macedonia) Emil Rajković	(Russia) CSKA Moscow	
Performance of the Season	(United States) Justin Roberson	(Russia) PARMA-PARI	
Sixth Man of the Year	(United States) Jalen Reynolds	(Russia) UNICS	
Defensive Player of the Year	(Russia) Evgeny Baburin	(Russia) Pari Nizhny Novgorod	
Newcomer of the Year	(France) Thomas Heurtel	(Russia) Zenit Saint Petersburg	
First Team	(France) Thomas Heurtel	(Russia) Zenit Saint Petersburg	
First Team	(United States) Daryl Macon	(Russia) UNICS	
First Team	(United States) Jaylen Barford	(Russia) Lokomotiv Kuban	
First Team	(France) Louis Labeyrie	(Russia) UNICS	
First Team	(Serbia) Nikola Milutinov	(Russia) CSKA Moscow	
Second Team	(United States) Jermaine Love	(Russia) Nizhny Novgorod	
Second Team	(Russia) Alexey Shved	(Russia) CSKA Moscow	
Second Team	(United States) Justin Robinson	(Russia) Parma	
Second Team	(France) Livio Jean-Charles	(Russia) CSKA Moscow	
Second Team	(United States) James Thompson	(Russia) Enisey	

=== MVP of the Month ===
Month	Player	Team	Ref.
2022
October	(Serbia) Nikola Milutinov	(Russia) CSKA Moscow	
November	(France) Thomas Heurtel	(Russia) Zenit Saint Petersburg	
December	(United States) Jalen Reynolds	(Russia) UNICS	
2023
January	(Russia) Alexey Shved	(Russia) CSKA Moscow	
February	(United States) Malik Newman	(Russia) Avtodor	
March	(United States) Isaiah Reese	(Russian Basketball Federation) PARMA-PARI	
