= Emil Rajković =

Northern Macedonian basketball player-coach

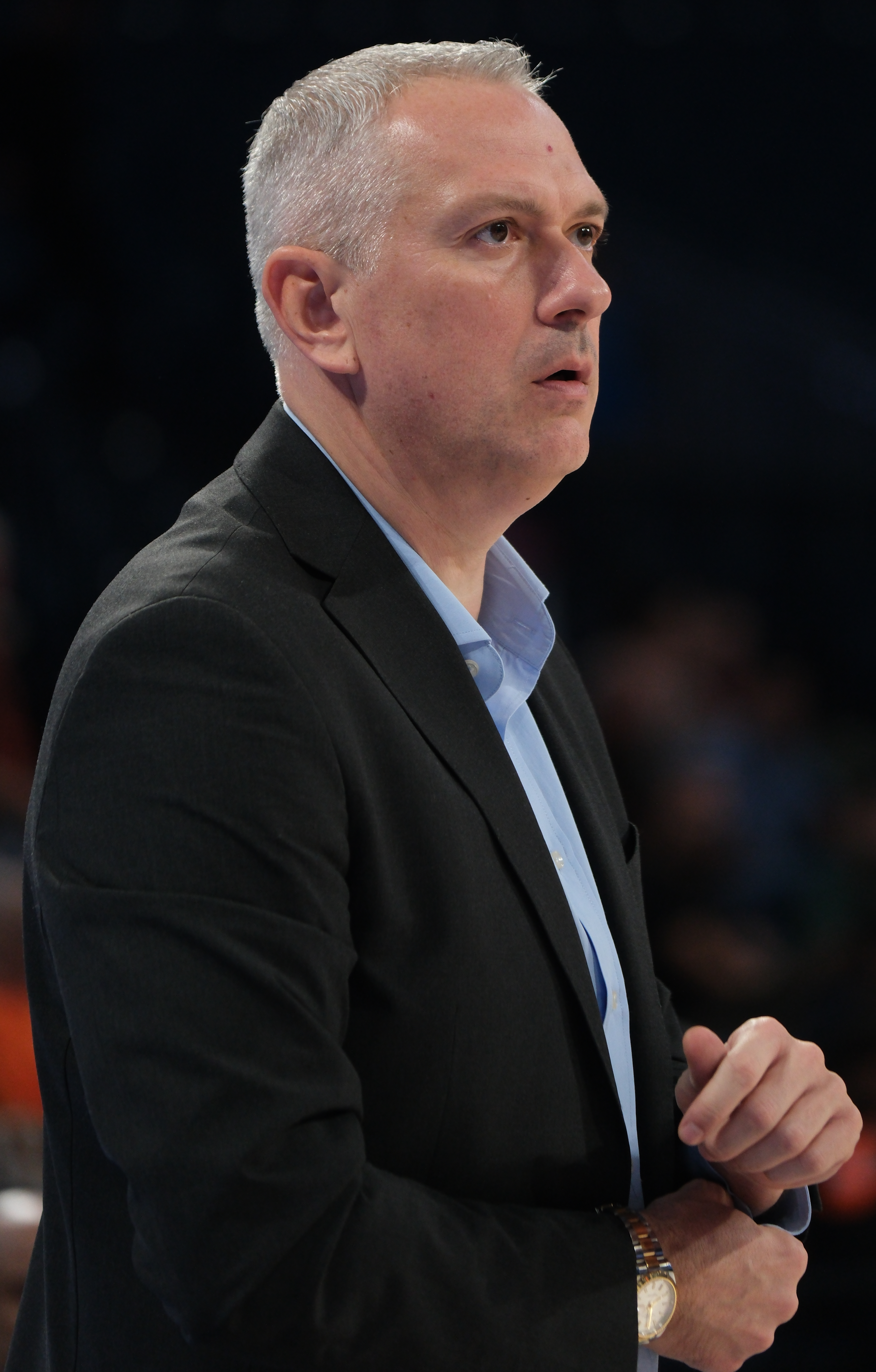

Personal information
- Born: September 11, 1978 (age 48) Skopje, Northern Macedonia
- Listed height: 1.96 m (6 ft 5 in)

Career information
- Playing career: 1995–2005
- Position: Head coach
- Coaching career: 2005–present

Career history

Playing
- 1995–1997: Rabotnički
- 1997–1998: Kumanovo
- 1998–2002: Rabotnički
- 2002: Vardar Imperijal
- 2003: Near East B.C.
- 2003–2004: MZT Skopje
- 2004–2005: FON Univerzitet

Coaching
- 2005–2006: Toa Sum Jas
- 2006–2013: Feni Industries
- 2013–2014: Rabotnički
- 2014–2016: Śląsk Wrocław
- 2016: MZT Skopje
- 2016–2018: Stal Ostrów Wielkopolski
- 2018–2021: Astana
- 2021–2022: Avtodor
- 2022–2024: CSKA Moscow
- 2025–2026: Tofaş

Career highlights
- As coach: 2× VTB United League Coach of the Year (2019, 2023); 3× Macedonian League champion (2008, 2010, 2011); 2× Macedonian Basketball Cup winner (2008, 2010); BIBL champion (2011)

Emil Rajkovic (born September 11, 1978) is a Macedonian former professional basketball player and coach. He was most recently the head coach Tofaş of Basketbol Süper Ligi (BSL).

He was the head coach of the Polish League club Śląsk Wrocław until 2016. Also he was the head coach for CSKA Moscow of the VTB United League.

== Professional career ==
Rajković played club basketball at the senior level from 1995 to 2005 with the Macedonian League clubs Rabotnicki, Kumanovo, Vardar and MZT Skopje.

== Coaching career ==
Rajković coached KK Feni Industries, MZT Skopje and Rabotnički.

On July 13, 2021, he signed with Avtodor of the VTB United League.

On June 25, 2025, he signed with Tofaş of Basketbol Süper Ligi (BSL).

== Head coaching career with National teams ==
- 2007–2008: Macedonia U-16 national basketball team
- 2008–2011: Macedonia U-20 national basketball team
- 2014–2015: Macedonia national basketball team (assistant)
- 2020–2021: Kazakhstan national team - FIBA Asia

== Championships as player ==
=== National domestic league championships ===
- 1995–1996: Rabotnicki: Macedonian First League
- 1996–1997: Rabotnicki: Macedonian First League
- 1998–1999: Rabotnicki: Macedonian First League
- 2000–2001: Rabotnicki: Macedonian First League
- 2001–2002: Rabotnicki: Macedonian First League

== Championships and cups as head coach ==
=== European club continental and regional championships ===
- 2010–2011: KK Feni Industries: BIBL

=== National domestic league championships ===
- 2007–2008: KK Feni Industries: Macedonian League
- 2009–2010: KK Feni Industries: Macedonian League
- 2010–2011: KK Feni Industries: Macedonian League
- 2017 Polish league bronze medal (BM Slam Stal Ostrow Wielkopolski)
- 2018 Polish league silver medal (BM Slam Stal Ostrow Wielkopolski)
- 2019 Kazakhstan National League Champion PBC Astana
- 2020 kazakhstan National League champion PBC Astana
- 2021 Kazakhstan National League champion PBC Astana
- 2023 Regular season champion - CSKA Moscow

=== National domestic cup championships ===
- 2007–2008: KK Feni Industries: Macedonian Cup
- 2009–2010: KK Feni Industries: Macedonian Cup
- 2016: MZT Skopje: Macedonian Super Cup
- 2019 National Cup of Kazakhstan - PBC Astana
- 2020 National Cup of Kazakhstan - PBC Astana
- 2021 National Cup of Kazakhstan - PBC Astana

== Honours ==
- Best coach of all team sports in Macedonia by the association of sports writers, sports hall of fame representatives & Sitel television 2008
- Best coach in Macedonia by the Basketball Federation of Macedonia - 2008, 2011, 2014
- Eurobasket.com All-Macedonian League Coach of the Year - 2008, 2010, 2011
- Eurobasket.com Balkan League Coach of the year 2011
- Balkan League Champion - 2011
- Macedonian National Cup Winner - 2008, 2010
- Macedonian League Champion - 2008, 2010, 2011
- Macedonian Super Cup - Winner 2017
- Eurobasket.com - All Polish league coach of the year 2017
- http://www.eurobasket.com/Poland/news/492260/Eurobasket.com-All-Polish-League-Awards-2017
- Coach of the year Polish basketball by "Polskikosz.pl" 2018
- http://polskikosz.pl/trener-sezonu-emil-rajkovic-stal-idzie-do-gory/
- Eurobasket.com - Kazakhstan National League Champion & "coach of the year" seasons 2018/19,2019/20,2020/21
- https://www.asia-basket.com/Kazakhstan/news/628791/Asia-Basket.com-All-Kazakhstan-League-Awards-2020
- Eurobasket.com - VTB United League “VTB League Coach of the year” 2019
- https://www.eurobasket.com/VTB-United-League/news/581402/Eurobasket.com-All-VTB-League-Awards-2019
- VTB United League “VTB-League Coach of the year” 2019
- https://www.vtb-league.com/en/news/emil-rajkovic-named-2018-19-coach-of-the-year/
- Eurobasket.com - VTB United League “VTB League Coach of the year” 2023
- https://vtb-league.com/en/news/emil-rajkovic-becomes-the-coach-of-the-year/

== Notes ==
- http://www.eurobasket.com/Poland/news/492260/Eurobasket.com-All-Polish-League-Awards-2017
- http://polskikosz.pl/trener-sezonu-emil-rajkovic-stal-idzie-do-gory/
- https://www.eurobasket.com/VTB-United-League/news/581402/Eurobasket.com-All-VTB-League-Awards-2019
- https://nbf.kz/en/news/2207-emil-raikovich-head-coach-of-the-national-basketball-team-of-kazakhstan
- http://www.fiba.basketball/asiachampionscup/2019/news/bc-astana-continues-to-rise-in-the-vtb-united-league
- https://www.vtb-league.com/en/news/emil-rajkovic-named-2018-19-coach-of-the-year/
- https://vtb-league.com/en/news/emil-rajkovic-becomes-the-coach-of-the-year/
