= Pavel Korobkov =

Russian basketball player

Free agent
- Position: Power forward / center

Personal information
- Born: October 18, 1990 (age 36) Guliston, Uzbek SSR, Soviet Union
- Listed height: 6 ft 9 in (2.06 m)
- Listed weight: 227 lb (103 kg)

Career information
- NBA draft: 2012: undrafted
- Playing career: 2012–2018

Career history
- 2012–2014: Nizhny Novgorod
- 2014–2018: CSKA Moscow

Career highlights
- EuroLeague champion (2016); 3× VTB United League champion (2015, 2016, 2017)

Pavel Valeryevich Korobkov (Russian: Павел Валерьевич Коробков; born October 18, 1990) is a Russian former professional basketball player who last played for CSKA Moscow of the VTB United League and the EuroLeague.

== Professional career ==
Korobkov grew up in the junior teams of Ural Great Perm, and last played there for their Under-23 team in the 2008–09 season. After going undrafted in the 2012 NBA draft, he signed with Russian VTB United League team Nizhny Novgorod. In his second season (2013–14), he averaged 10.5 points in the VTB United League playoffs, to lead his team to a second place finish, and its first ever EuroLeague berth.

In July 2014, Korobkov signed a three-year contract with CSKA Moscow. In his first season with the team, CSKA Moscow won the VTB United League, after eliminating Khimki with a 3–0 series sweep in the league's finals series.

== Russian national team ==
Korobkov has been a member of the senior Russian national basketball team. He played at the EuroBasket 2015 qualification tournament.

== Career statistics ==
Legend
GP	Games played	GS	Games started	MPG	Minutes per game
FG%	Field-goal percentage	3P%	3-point field-goal percentage	FT%	Free-throw percentage
RPG	Rebounds per game	APG	Assists per game	SPG	Steals per game
BPG	Blocks per game	PPG	Points per game	PIR	Performance index rating
**Bold**	Career high

=== EuroLeague ===
†	Denotes seasons in which Korobkov won the EuroLeague

Year	Team	GP	GS	MPG	FG%	3P%	FT%	RPG	APG	SPG	BPG	PPG	PIR
2014–15	CSKA Moscow	**19**	0	**9.0**	.741	**1.000**	.786	1.3	.3	**.2**	**.5**	**2.9**	**3.1**
2015–16†	CSKA Moscow	15	**1**	8.1	.581	.000	.667	**1.5**	**.4**	**.2**	.1	2.8	2.0
2017–18	CSKA Moscow	4	0	8.3	**.800**	—	**1.000**	.3	—	—	—	8.3	0.8
Career		38	1	8.6	.667	.400	.750	1.3	.3	.2	.3	2.8	2.4
