= Vojin Ilić =

Bosnian basketball player (born 2000)

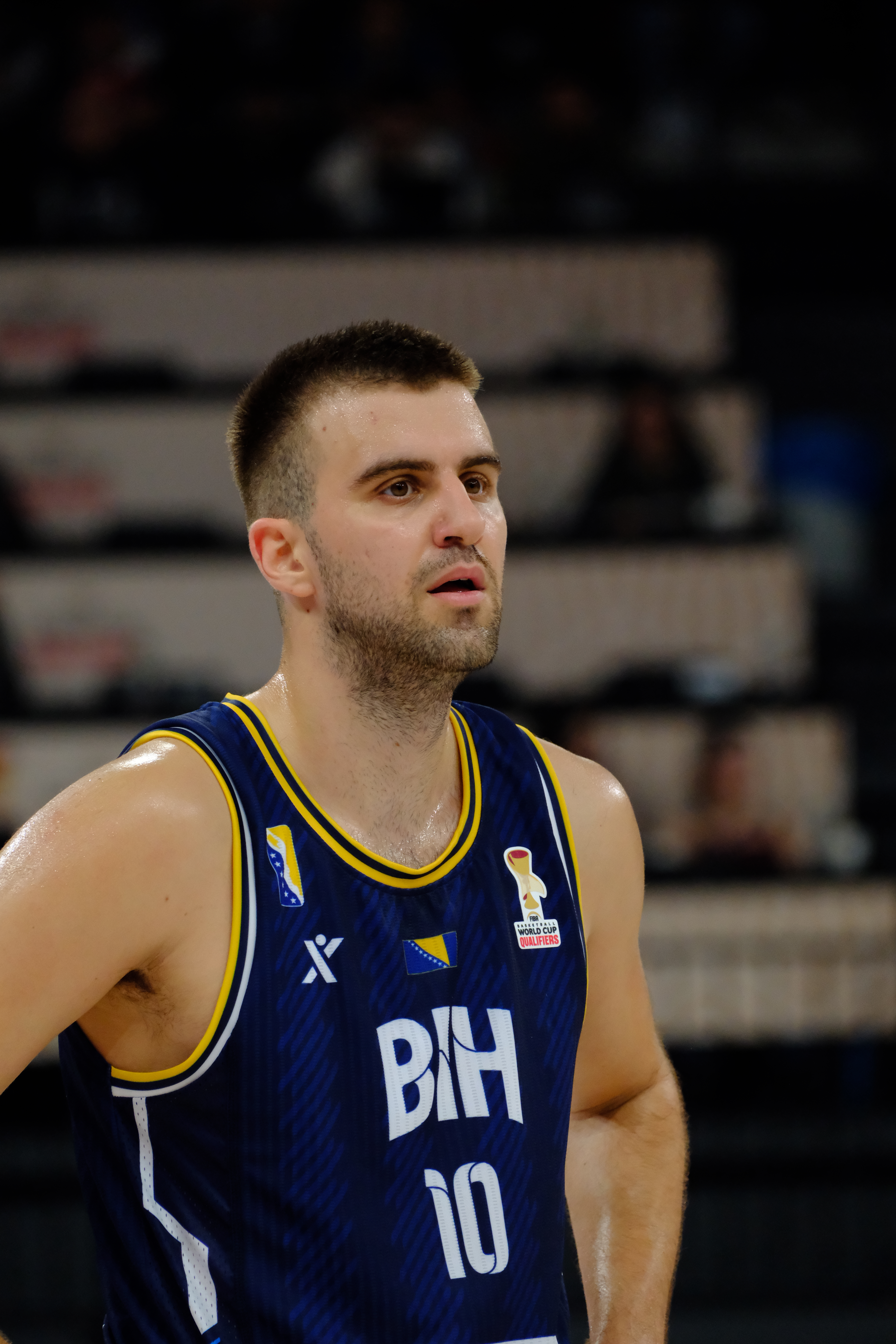
- Ilić with Bosnia and Herzegovina in 2025

Free agent
- Position: Forward

Personal information
- Born: 9 August 2000 (age 26) Zvornik, Bosnia and Herzegovina
- Listed height: 200 cm (6 ft 7 in)

Career information
- Playing career: 2017–present

Career history
- 2017–2021: Spars
- 2021–2022: Vršac
- 2022–2023: Budućnost Bijeljina
- 2023–2024: Bosna
- 2024-2026: Igokea

Career highlights
- Mirza Delibašić Cup (2023–24); Mirza Delibašić Cup MVP (2023–24); Bosnian Championship (2024–25)

Vojin Ilić (born 9 August 2000) is a Bosnian professional basketball player who plays as a forward for Igokea in the Adriatic League and the Basketball Championship of Bosnia and Herzegovina. Known for his scoring ability and versatility, Ilić has also represented the Bosnia and Herzegovina national team at senior level.

== Early life ==
Ilić was born in Zvornik, Bosnia and Herzegovina. He began his basketball career at a young age with the local club Budućnost Bijeljina before moving into the youth system of OKK Spars, where he developed as a standout prospect.

== Club career ==
Ilić began his professional career with Spars in 2017, competing in the ABA League Second Division. In 2021, he signed with KK Vršac in the Basketball League of Serbia for the 2021–22 season, before returning to Bosnia and Herzegovina to play for Budućnost Bijeljina in the 2022–23 campaign.

In 2023, Ilić joined KK Bosna, where he was the team's leading scorer, averaging 16.6 points, along with four rebounds and three assists per game before transferring to Igokea in June 2024 under a multiyear contract.

With Igokea, he has competed in both the Adriatic League and international club competitions, including the Basketball Champions League.

== International career ==
Ilić has represented the Bosnia and Herzegovina men's national basketball team at senior level, appearing in qualification games for major tournaments including EuroBasket qualifiers. He previously starred for Bosnia at youth level, notably at FIBA U18 EuroBasket where he averaged 17.8 points per game.

== Style of play ==
Ilić is a forward known for his scoring instincts, ability to create offense, and athleticism.
