= Ville Tahvanainen =

Finnish basketball player (born 2000)

Korihait
- Position: Shooting guard
- League: Korisliiga

Personal information
- Born: 30 June 2000 (age 26) Helsinki, Finland
- Listed height: 1.93 m (6 ft 4 in)
- Listed weight: 95 kg (209 lb)

Career information
- High school: Helsinki Basketball Academy (Helsinki, Finland)
- College: Bradley (2019–2023)
- NBA draft: 2023: undrafted
- Playing career: 2016–present

Career history
- 2016–2017: Helsingin NMKY
- 2017–2019: HBA-Märsky
- 2023: Haukar
- 2023–2024: Álftanes
- 2024–2025: CD Póvoa
- 2025–present: Korihait
Medals
- Korisliiga Rookie of the Season (2026)

Ville Tahvanainen (born 30 June 2000), is a Finnish professional basketball player for Korihait in the Korisliiga.

== Career ==
Tahvanainen started his career with NMKY Helsinki and HBA-Märsky, before moving to the United States to start college in Bradley in 2019.

After a season in Iceland as a professional with Haukar and Álftanes, Tahvanainen signed with CD Póvoa in the Liga Portuguesa de Basquetebol in September 2024.

In September 2025, Tahvanainen returned to Finland and signed with Korisliiga team Korihait.

== National team ==
Tahvanainen debuted in the Finland national basketball team in 2018 at the age of 18.

== Personal life ==
His father Mika-Matti Tahvanainen is a former professional basketball player who represented Finland national team in 54 games, and his brother Joonas is also a former player who played also for HBA-Märsky and college basketball in the United States.

== Career statistics ==
Legend
GP	Games played	GS	Games started	MPG	Minutes per game
FG%	Field goal percentage	3P%	3-point field goal percentage	FT%	Free throw percentage
RPG	Rebounds per game	APG	Assists per game	SPG	Steals per game
BPG	Blocks per game	PPG	Points per game	**Bold**	Career high

=== College ===
Year	Team	GP	GS	MPG	FG%	3P%	FT%	RPG	APG	SPG	BPG	PPG
2019–20	Bradley	33	2	20.0	**.466**	**.391**	.846	2.5	1.0	.2	.0	6.6
2020–21	Bradley	27	**17**	**28.0**	.422	.338	.818	3.0	**1.6**	**.6**	0	**8.6**
2021–22	Bradley	28	12	22.8	.357	.362	**.913**	2.5	.8	**.6**	**.2**	7.1
2022–23	Bradley	**34**	3	22.2	.444	.368	.826	**3.3**	1.3	.5	.1	6.7
Career		122	34	23.0	.421	.363	.851	2.8	1.2	.5	.1	7.2
