= 2014–15 VTB United League =

VTB United League^{1}
- Season: 2014–15
- Duration: 3 October 2014 – April 2015
- Games played: 240 (regular season)
- Teams: 16

Regular season
- Season MVP: (France) Nando de Colo

Finals
- Champions: (Russia) CSKA Moscow (6th VTB League title) (22nd Russian national title)
- Runners-up: (Russia) Khimki
- Playoffs MVP: (Russia) Andrey Vorontsevich

Awards
- Coach of the Year: (Greece) Dimitris Itoudis
- Defensive Player: (Russia) Andrey Vorontsevich
- Sixth Man: (Finland) Petteri Koponen
- Young Player: (Latvia) Jānis Timma

Statistical leaders
| Points | (United States) Randy Culpepper | 21.0 |
| Rebounds | (United States Virgin Islands) Frank Elegar | 11.3 |
| Assists | (United States) D.J. Cooper | 9.2 |
- ^{1} Sponsored league name, referring to VTB Bank.

The 2014–15 VTB United League was the 6th complete season of the VTB United League. It was the second season in which the VTB United League functioned as the new domestic first tier level for Russian professional basketball clubs, which can qualify through this league to EuroLeague.

CSKA Moscow was the defending champion. CSKA successfully defended its title, as they took the league title by beating Khimki 3–0 in the Finals.

== Teams ==
On 20 July 2014, drawing of two group of 11 teams was held in Moscow. On 25 July 2014, five Lithuanian teams (Lietuvos rytas, Neptūnas Klaipėda, Dzūkija, Lietkabelis, Nevėžis) withdrew from the competition due to the Lithuanian Basketball League's decision to expand its regular-season schedule up to 40 games per team. New format with double round-robin tournament was proposed for the 2014–15 VTB United League.

This proposal for the regular season was approved on 1 August 2014. The eight best teams of the regular season will qualify to the playoffs.

== Regular season ==
| Pos | Team | Pld | W | L | PF | PA | PD | Qualification |
|---|---|---|---|---|---|---|---|---|
| 1 | (Russia) CSKA Moscow | 30 | 26 | 4 | 2713 | 2151 | +562 | Qualification to playoffs |
| 2 | (Russia) Khimki | 30 | 25 | 5 | 2647 | 2336 | +311 | Qualification to playoffs |
| 3 | (Russia) Lokomotiv Kuban | 30 | 23 | 7 | 2582 | 2242 | +340 | Qualification to playoffs |
| 4 | (Russia) Zenit Saint Petersburg | 30 | 22 | 8 | 2499 | 2362 | +137 | Qualification to playoffs |
| 5 | (Russia) Nizhny Novgorod | 30 | 19 | 11 | 2479 | 2390 | +89 | Qualification to playoffs |
| 6 | (Russia) UNICS | 30 | 19 | 11 | 2287 | 2189 | +98 | Qualification to playoffs |
| 7 | (Russia) Avtodor Saratov | 30 | 17 | 13 | 2718 | 2649 | +69 | Qualification to playoffs |
| 8 | (Kazakhstan) Astana | 30 | 13 | 17 | 2385 | 2458 | −73 | Qualification to playoffs |
| 9 | (Estonia) Kalev/Cramo | 30 | 13 | 17 | 2323 | 2587 | −264 | |
| 10 | (Latvia) VEF Rīga | 30 | 12 | 18 | 2375 | 2401 | −26 | |
| 11 | (Russia) Enisey | 30 | 10 | 20 | 2567 | 2653 | −86 | |
| 12 | (Russia) Krasny Oktyabr | 30 | 9 | 21 | 2353 | 2505 | −152 | |
| 13 | (Finland) Bisons | 30 | 9 | 21 | 2383 | 2500 | −117 | |
| 14 | (Czech Republic) ČEZ Nymburk | 30 | 9 | 21 | 2396 | 2509 | −113 | |
| 15 | (Belarus) Tsmoki-Minsk | 30 | 7 | 23 | 2345 | 2665 | −320 | |
| 16 | (Russia) Krasnye Krylia | 30 | 7 | 23 | 2060 | 2515 | −455 | |

Source: VTB United League

== Playoffs ==
Quarterfinals
1 | (Russia) CSKA Moscow | 103 | 110 | 111 | X | X
8 | (Kazakhstan) Astana | 58 | 60 | 75 | X | X
4 | (Russia) Zenit | 73 | 80 | 75 | 83 | 65
5 | (Russia) Nizhny Novgorod | 72 | 84 | 88 | 76 | 75
2 | (Russia) Khimki | 99 | 87 | 89 | X | X
7 | (Russia) Avtodor Saratov | 77 | 71 | 87 | X | X
3 | (Russia) Lokomotiv Kuban | 74 | 89 | 86 | X | X
6 | (Russia) UNICS | 63 | 75 | 75 | X | X

Semifinals
1 | (Russia) CSKA Moscow | 86 | 97 | 92 | X | X
5 | (Russia) Nizhny Novgorod | 79 | 77 | 80 | X | X
2 | (Russia) Khimki | 76 | 76 | 55 | 76 | 94
3 | (Russia) Lokomotiv Kuban | 75 | 83 | 78 | 67 | 77

Finals
1 | (Russia) CSKA Moscow | 89 | 94 | 99 | X | X
2 | (Russia) Khimki | 62 | 81 | 69 | X | X

== Awards ==
=== Most Valuable Player ===
| Player | Team | Ref. |
|---|---|---|
| (France) Nando de Colo | (Russia) CSKA Moscow | |

=== Playoffs MVP ===
| Player | Team | Ref. |
|---|---|---|
| (Russia) Andrey Vorontsevich | (Russia) CSKA Moscow | |

=== Sixth Man of the Year ===
| Player | Team | Ref. |
|---|---|---|
| (Finland) Petteri Koponen | (Russia) Khimki | |

=== Young Player of the Year ===
| Player | Team | Ref. |
|---|---|---|
| (Latvia) Jānis Timma | (Latvia) VEF Rīga | |

=== Coach of the Year ===
| Coach | Team | Ref. |
|---|---|---|
| (Greece) Dimitrios Itoudis | (Russia) CSKA Moscow | |

=== Defensive Player of the Year ===
| Player | Team | Ref. |
|---|---|---|
| (United States) Andrey Vorontsevich | (Russia) CSKA Moscow | |

=== All-VTB United League Teams ===
| First Team | | Second Team | |
| Player | Team | Player | Team |
|---|---|---|---|
| (France) Nando de Colo | (Russia) CSKA Moscow | (Serbia) Miloš Teodosić | (Russia) CSKA Moscow |
| (United States) Courtney Fortson | (Russia) Avtodor | (Finland) Petteri Koponen | (Russia) Khimki |
| (Montenegro) Tyrese Rice | (Russia) Khimki | (Montenegro) Taylor Rochestie | (Russia) Nizhny Novgorod |
| (United States) Derrick Brown | (Russia) Lokomotiv Kuban | (United States) Micah Downs | (Russia) Avtodor |
| (Ukraine) Kyrylo Fesenko | (Russia) Lokomotiv Kuban | (Russia) Andrey Vorontsevich | (Russia) CSKA Moscow |

=== MVP of the Month ===
| Month | Winner | Team |
|---|---|---|
| October | (Serbia) Miloš Teodosić | CSKA Moscow |
| November | (Montenegro) Taylor Rochestie | Nizhny Novgorod |
| December | (United States) Courtney Fortson | Avtodor Saratov |
| January | (Ukraine) Kyrylo Fesenko | Avtodor Saratov |
| February | (Montenegro) Tyrese Rice | BC Khimki |
| March | (Brazil) Scott Machado | BC Kalev |
| April | (Austria) Rašid Mahalbašić | BC Astana |

== Player statistics ==
=== Points ===
| Rank | Player | Team | Games | Points | Average |
|---|---|---|---|---|---|
| 1. | (United States) Randy Culpepper | (Russia) Krasny Oktyabr | 11 | 226 | 20.55 |
| 2. | (United States) Gerald Robinson | (Latvia) VEF | 17 | 319 | 18.76 |
| 3. | (United States) Courtney Fortson | (Russia) Avtodor | 18 | 335 | 18.61 |
| 4. | (United States Virgin Islands) Walter Hodge | (Russia) Zenit | 15 | 256 | 17.07 |
| 5. | (Montenegro) Taylor Rochestie | (Russia) Nizhny Novgorod | 13 | 220 | 16.92 |

=== Assists ===
| Rank | Player | Team | Games | Assists | Average |
|---|---|---|---|---|---|
| 1. | (Kazakhstan) Jerry Johnson | (Kazakhstan) Astana | 14 | 119 | 8.50 |
| 2. | (United States) Donell Cooper | (Russia) Enisey | 18 | 150 | 8.33 |
| 3. | (Brazil) Scott Machado | (Estonia) Kalev | 17 | 133 | 7.82 |
| 4. | (United States Virgin Islands) Walter Hodge | (Russia) Zenit | 15 | 111 | 7.40 |
| 5. | (United States) Courtney Fortson | (Russia) Avtodor | 18 | 127 | 7.06 |

=== Rebounds ===
| Rank | Player | Team | Games | Rebounds | Average |
|---|---|---|---|---|---|
| 1. | (United States Virgin Islands) Frank Elegar | (Estonia) Kalev | 14 | 157 | 11.21 |
| 2. | (United States) Kervin Bristol | (Russia) Krasnye Krylia | 14 | 135 | 9.64 |
| 3. | (Ukraine) Kyrylo Fesenko | (Russia) Avtodor | 12 | 113 | 9.42 |
| 4. | (Greece) Pat Calathes | (Kazakhstan) Astana | 16 | 136 | 8.50 |
| 5. | (Montenegro) Ivan Maraš | (Belarus) Tsmoki-Minsk | 16 | 133 | 8.31 |

=== Efficiency ===
| Rank | Name | Team | Games | Efficiency | Average |
|---|---|---|---|---|---|
| 1. | (United States Virgin Islands) Frank Elegar | (Estonia) Kalev | 14 | 293 | 20.93 |
| 2. | (United States) Ian Hummer | (Finland) Bisons | 18 | 363 | 20.17 |
| 3. | (Montenegro) Taylor Rochestie | (Russia) Nizhny Novgorod | 13 | 256 | 19.69 |
| 4. | (United States) Trey Thompkins | (Russia) Nizhny Novgorod | 16 | 312 | 19.50 |
| 5. | (Ukraine) Kyrylo Fesenko | (Russia) Avtodor | 12 | 234 | 19.50 |
