= 2018–19 VTB United League =

VTB United League
- Season: 2018–19
- Duration: 5 October 2018 – 28 April 2019 (Regular season); 3 May – 10 June 2019 (Playoffs)
- Teams: 14

Regular season
- Season MVP: (Russia) Alexey Shved

Finals
- Champions: (Russia) CSKA Moscow (10th title)
- Runners-up: (Russia) Khimki
- Third place: (Russia) UNICS
- Fourth place: (Russia) Zenit
- Playoffs MVP: (Russia) Nikita Kurbanov

The 2018–19 VTB United League was the 10th complete season of the VTB United League. It was also the sixth season that the league functions as the Russian domestic first tier level. It started in October 2018 with the first round of the regular season and ended in June 2019 with the last game of the finals.

CSKA Moscow is the defending champion.

== Format changes ==
From this season, the top eight teams qualify for the playoffs. All series are played in a best-of-five format with a 2–2–1 structure.

== Teams ==
A total of 14 teams from six countries contest the league, including nine sides from Russia, one from Belarus, one from Estonia, one from Kazakhstan, one from Latvia and one from Poland.

Zielona Góra made their debut in the competition. Polish teams returned to the competition four years after.

=== Venues and locations ===
Locations of teams in the 2018–19 VTB United League

Team	Home city	Arena	Capacity
(Kazakhstan) Astana	Astana	Arena Velotrack	9,270
(Russia) Avtodor Saratov	Saratov	DS Kristall	5,500
(Russia) CSKA Moscow	Moscow	USC CSKA	5,000
(Russia) Enisey	Krasnoyarsk	Arena.Sever	4,000
(Estonia) Kalev/Cramo	Tallinn	Saku Suurhall	5,500
(Russia) Khimki	Khimki	BCMO	4,000
(Russia) Lokomotiv Kuban	Krasnodar	Basket-Hall	7,500
(Russia) Nizhny Novgorod	Nizhny Novgorod	Trade Union Sport Palace	5,500
(Russia) Parma	Perm	UDS Molot	7,000
(Belarus) Tsmoki Minsk	Minsk	Minsk-Arena	15,000
(Russia) UNICS	Kazan	Basket-Hall	7,000
(Latvia) VEF Rīga	Riga	Arēna Rīga	12,000
(Russia) Zenit Saint Petersburg	Saint Petersburg	SK Yubileyniy	6,381
(Poland) Zielona Góra	Zielona Góra	CRS Hall Zielona Góra	6,080

=== Personnel and sponsorship ===
Team	Head coach	Kit manufacturer	Main front sponsor
(Kazakhstan) Astana	(North Macedonia) Emil Rajković	Túta	-
(Russia) Avtodor Saratov	(Russia) Evgeniy Pashutin	DiGS-Line	-
(Russia) CSKA Moscow	(Greece) Dimitrios Itoudis	Nike	Aeroflot
(Russia) Enisey	(Russia) Oleg Okulov	Nike	-
(Estonia) Kalev/Cramo	(Lithuania) Donaldas Kairys	Nike	Cramo
(Russia) Khimki	(Greece) Georgios Bartzokas	Adidas	Gazprom Investholding
(Russia) Lokomotiv Kuban	(Serbia) Saša Obradović	Under Armour	RZD
(Russia) Nizhny Novgorod	(Serbia) Zoran Lukić	Nike	T Plus
(Russia) Parma	(Latvia) Nikolajs Mazurs	Peak	T Plus
(Belarus) Tsmoki Minsk	(Belarus) Aliaksandr Krutsikau	Adidas	Green
(Russia) UNICS	(Greece) Dimitrios Priftis	Peak	-
(Latvia) VEF Rīga	(Latvia) Jānis Gailītis	Adidas	VEF
(Russia) Zenit Saint Petersburg	(Russia) Vasily Karasev	Nike	Nipigas
(Poland) Zielona Góra	(Montenegro) Igor Jovović	Spalding	Stelmet

== Regular season ==
In the regular season, teams play against each other twice (home-and-away) in a round-robin format.

=== Standings ===
Pos	Team	Pld	W	L	PF	PA	PD	PCT	Qualification
1	(Russia) CSKA Moscow	26	22	4	2404	1969	+435	.846	Advance to playoffs
2	(Russia) UNICS	26	21	5	2190	1945	+245	.808	Advance to playoffs
3	(Russia) Khimki	26	20	6	2230	1973	+257	.769	Advance to playoffs
4	(Russia) Lokomotiv Kuban	26	17	9	2171	2004	+167	.654	Advance to playoffs
5	(Russia) Zenit Saint Petersburg	26	15	11	2300	2180	+120	.577	Advance to playoffs
6	(Kazakhstan) Astana	26	15	11	2239	2169	+70	.577	Advance to playoffs
7	(Estonia) Kalev/Cramo	26	14	12	2342	2275	+67	.538	Advance to playoffs
8	(Russia) Nizhny Novgorod	26	14	12	2158	2173	−15	.538	Advance to playoffs
9	(Russia) Enisey	26	11	15	2154	2276	−122	.423	
10	(Latvia) VEF Rīga	26	10	16	1962	2134	−172	.385	
11	(Russia) Avtodor Saratov	26	9	17	2379	2478	−99	.346	
12	(Poland) Zielona Góra	26	5	21	2020	2330	−310	.192	
13	(Russia) Parma	26	5	21	2025	2298	−273	.192	
14	(Belarus) Tsmoki Minsk	26	4	22	1959	2329	−370	.154	

Source: VTB United League

=== Results ===
Home \ Away	AST	AVT	CSK	ENI	KAL	KHI	LOK	NIZ	PAR	TSM	UNI	VEF	ZEN	ZGA
Astana	—	100–83	61–86	93–85	105–78	67–76	83–93	83–89	79–71	101–71	79–83	90–77	93–91	84–70
Avtodor Saratov	64–88	—	110–116	106–91	112–109	92–100	95–102	85–91	93–76	95–99	95–111	83–85	95–94	112–106
CSKA Moscow	91–72	110–76	—	101–71	102–75	75–65	70–57	84–78	108–84	119–88	73–83	92–66	83–73	102–78
Enisey	93–84	88–84	66–91	—	80–88	67–99	86–93	92–88	83–78	80–68	78–99	75–67	85–87	109–81
Kalev/Cramo	102–74	102–113	80–85	109–91	—	85–96	81–76	94–84	93–82	108–83	95–107	75–85	96–80	80–77
Khimki	93–80	85–77	73–72	86–94	80–73	—	82–84	80–93	97–63	70–50	78–65	75–51	90–67	100–80
Lokomotiv Kuban	71–90	95–91	76–93	79–67	80–85	83–87	—	78–71	93–75	80–69	77–84	92–63	96–64	73–41
Nizhny Novgorod	85–78	75–98	89–95	79–64	68–82	93–97	75–88	—	100–98	77–70	91–85	93–83	85–83	101–61
Parma	80–85	93–105	69–79	92–88	75–105	70–80	87–95	80–85	—	92–83	68–66	73–78	78–107	72–92
Tsmoki Minsk	86–93	86–93	61–101	73–95	82–95	92–108	66–97	78–87	80–68	—	57–99	91–84	68–79	71–88
UNICS	95–98	76–63	71–68	95–92	76–74	73–58	79–75	89–64	76–82	88–69	—	89–74	74–72	86–66
VEF Rīga	71–93	89–78	80–107	68–70	82–74	67–96	75–71	65–67	76–80	70–66	52–82	—	77–86	83–57
Zenit Saint Petersburg	103–95	103–81	93–86	116–81	100–87	86–82	78–94	103–78	84–76	84–72	74–77	101–102	—	83–71
Zielona Góra	82–91	108–100	74–115	72–83	100–117	74–97	67–73	80–72	88–63	78–80	73–82	78–92	78–109	—

Source: VTB United League
Legend: Blue = home team win; Red = away team win.

== Playoffs ==
All series are played in a best-of-five series, with a 2–2–1 format.

=== Bracket ===
Quarterfinals
(Russia) CSKA Moscow	3
(Russia) Nizhny Novgorod	0
(Russia) Lokomotiv Kuban	1
(Russia) Zenit Saint Petersburg	3
(Russia) UNICS	3
(Estonia) Kalev/Cramo	0
(Russia) Khimki	3
(Kazakhstan) Astana	0

Semifinals
(Russia) CSKA Moscow	3
(Russia) Zenit Saint Petersburg	0
(Russia) UNICS	1
(Russia) Khimki	3

Finals
(Russia) CSKA Moscow	3
(Russia) Khimki	0

=== Quarterfinals ===
Team 1	Series	Team 2	Game 1	Game 2	Game 3	Game 4	Game 5
CSKA Moscow (Russia)	3–0	(Russia) Nizhny Novgorod	87–50	86–66	80–72		
UNICS (Russia)	3–0	(Estonia) Kalev/Cramo	92–82	108–84	96–84		
Khimki (Russia)	3–0	(Kazakhstan) Astana	82–59	94–64	88–81		
Lokomotiv Kuban (Russia)	1–3	(Russia) Zenit Saint Petersburg	69–78	70–69	78–94	85–87	

=== Semifinals ===
Team 1	Series	Team 2	Game 1	Game 2	Game 3	Game 4	Game 5
CSKA Moscow (Russia)	3–0	(Russia) Zenit Saint Petersburg	98–82	83–81	69–68		
UNICS (Russia)	1–3	(Russia) Khimki	96–91	98–103	64–91	91–92	

=== Finals ===
Team 1	Series	Team 2	Game 1	Game 2	Game 3	Game 4	Game 5
CSKA Moscow (Russia)	3–0	(Russia) Khimki	106–85	103–92	80–62		

== Final table ==
Pos	Team	Pld	W	L	Qualification
1st place, gold medalist(s)	(Russia) CSKA Moscow	35	31	4	2019–20 EuroLeague
2nd place, silver medalist(s)	(Russia) Khimki	36	26	10	2019–20 EuroLeague
3rd place, bronze medalist(s)	(Russia) UNICS	33	25	8	2019–20 EuroCup
4	(Russia) Zenit Saint Petersburg	33	18	15	2019–20 EuroLeague wildcard
5	(Russia) Lokomotiv Kuban	30	18	12	2019–20 EuroCup
6	(Kazakhstan) Astana	29	15	14	
7	(Estonia) Kalev/Cramo	29	14	15	
8	(Russia) Nizhny Novgorod	29	14	15	2019–20 Champions League
9	(Russia) Enisey	26	11	15	2019–20 FIBA Europe Cup
10	(Latvia) VEF Rīga	26	10	16	
11	(Russia) Avtodor Saratov	26	9	17	
12	(Poland) Zielona Góra	26	5	21	
13	(Russia) Parma	26	5	21	
14	(Belarus) Tsmoki Minsk	26	4	22	

Source: VTB United League

== Awards ==
=== Season Awards ===
Scoring Champion

- (Russia) Alexey Shved – Khimki

Young Player of the Year

- (Russia) Nikita Mikhailovsky – Avtodor Saratov

Coach of the Year

- (North Macedonia) Emil Rajković – Astana

Sixth Man of the Year

- (United States) Dorell Wright – Lokomotiv Kuban

Performance of the Season

- (France) Nando de Colo – CSKA Moscow

Defensive Player of the Year

- (Senegal) Maurice Ndour – UNICS

Regular Season MVP

- (Russia) Alexey Shved – Khimki

Playoffs MVP

- (Russia) Nikita Kurbanov – CSKA Moscow

=== All-Tournament First Team ===
- (Russia) Alexey Shved – Khimki
- (France) Nando de Colo – CSKA Moscow
- (United States) Jalen Reynolds – Zenit
- (United States) Jordan Mickey – Khimki
- (United States) Othello Hunter – CSKA Moscow

=== All-Tournament Second Team ===
- (United States) Errick McCollum – UNICS
- (Poland) Mateusz Ponitka – Lokomotiv Kuban
- (United States) J. J. O'Brien – Astana
- (Latvia) Jānis Timma – Khimki
- (United States) Arnett Moultrie – Kalev/Cramo

=== MVP of the Month ===
Month	Player	Team	Ref.
2018
October	(Russia) Alexey Shved	(Russia) Khimki	
November	(France) Nando de Colo	(Russia) CSKA Moscow	
December	(United States) Anthony Clemmons	(Kazakhstan) Astana	
2019
January	(United States) Jalen Reynolds	(Russia) Zenit Saint Petersburg	
February	(United States) Pierriá Henry	(Russia) UNICS	
March	(Russia) Alexey Shved (2)	(Russia) Khimki	
April	(United States) Arnett Moultrie	(Estonia) Kalev/Cramo	

== VTB League teams in European competitions ==
Team	Competition	Progress
CSKA Moscow	EuroLeague	Champions
Khimki	EuroLeague	Regular season
Lokomotiv Kuban	EuroCup	Quarterfinals
UNICS	EuroCup	Semifinals
BC Zenit Saint Petersburg	EuroCup	Top 16
Nizhny Novgorod	Champions League	Quarterfinals
Avtodor Saratov	Champions League	First qualifying round
Avtodor Saratov	FIBA Europe Cup	Round of 16
Tsmoki-Minsk	Champions League	First qualifying round
Tsmoki-Minsk	FIBA Europe Cup	Regular season
