= Mert Akay =

Turkish basketball player (born 2000)

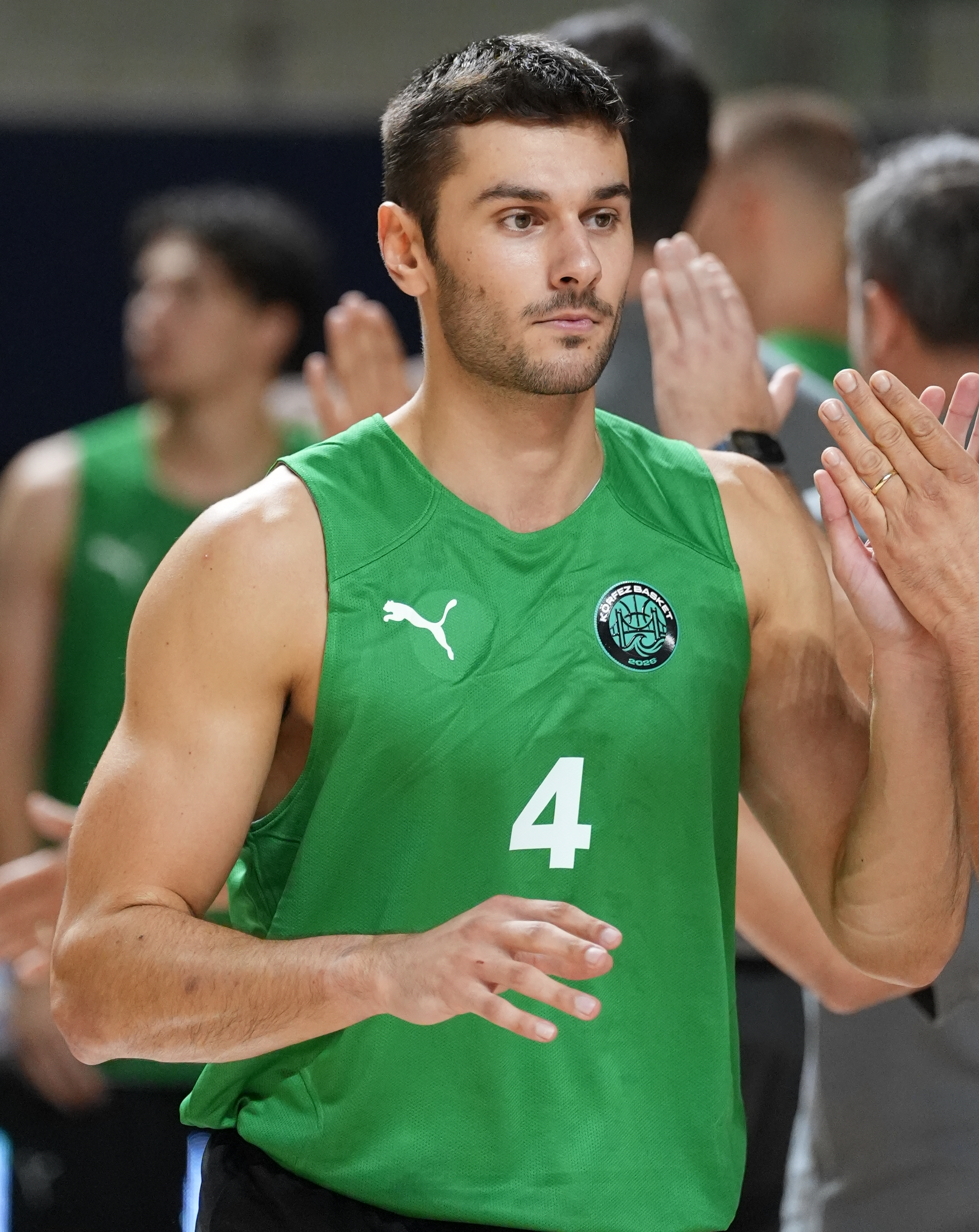
- Mert Akay (2018)

No. 4 – Biotekno Körfez Basket
- Position: Small forward / shooting guard
- League: BSL

Personal information
- Born: 12 July 2000 (age 26) Beyoğlu, Turkey
- Listed height: 1.96 m (6 ft 5 in)
- Listed weight: 82 kg (181 lb)

Career information
- NBA draft: 2022: undrafted
- Playing career: 2018–present

Career history
- 2018–2019: Darüşşafaka
- 2019–2022: Dynamic Belgrade
- 2025–2026: Darüşşafaka
- 2026–present: Körfez Basket
Medals
Men's basketball
Representing Turkey
FIBA Europe Under-16 Championship
Bronze medal – third place	2016 Poland	U16 team

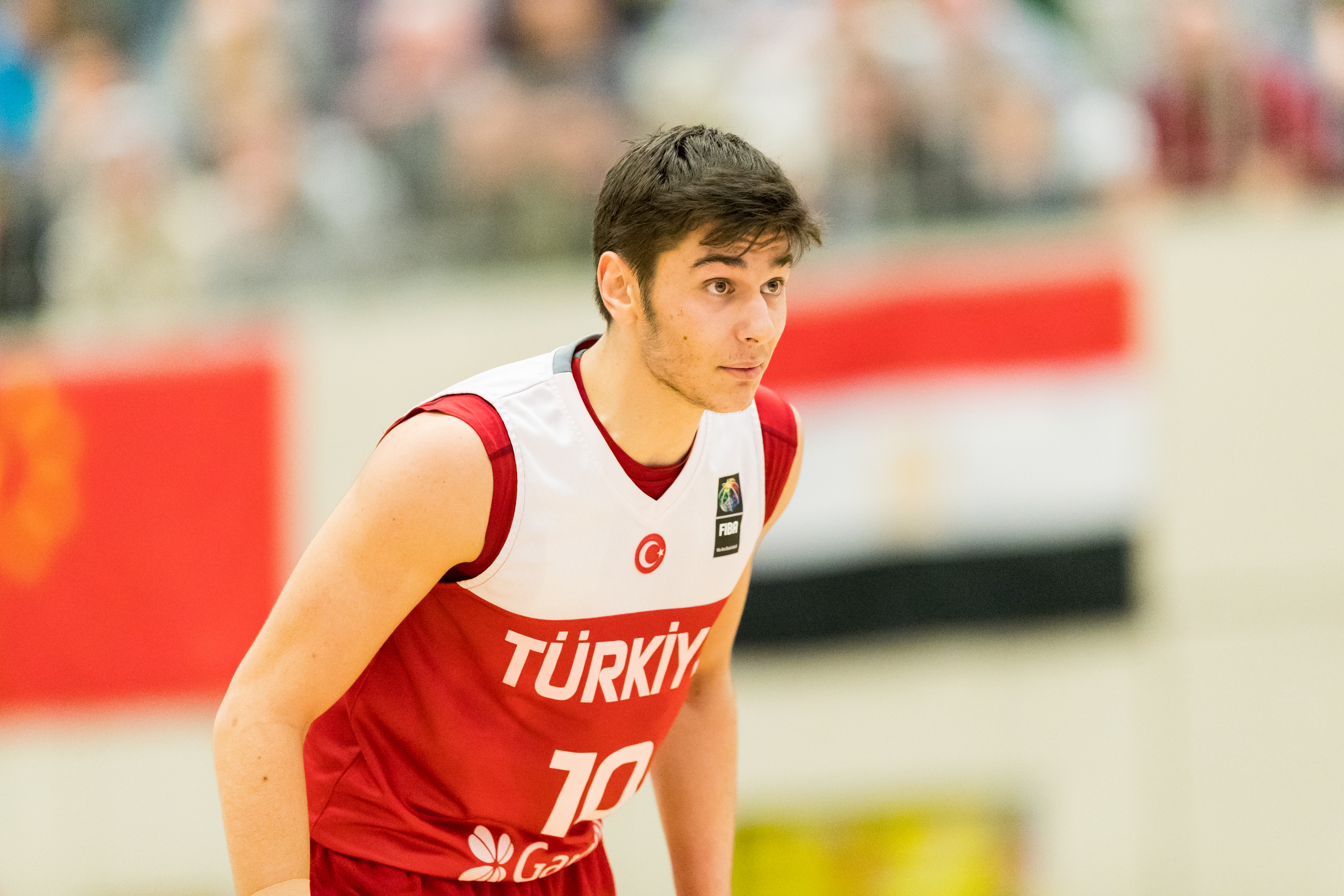

Mert Akay (born 12 July 2000) is a Turkish professional basketball player for Körfez Basket of the Basketbol Süper Ligi (BSL). Standing at 6 feet 5 inches (1.96 m), he plays the small forward and shooting guard positions.

== Professional career ==
Akay grew up with the youth system of Darüşşafaka. In the 2018–19 season, he became a regular member of Darüşşafaka's senior team. On 25 January 2019, Akay made his EuroLeague debut for Darüşşafaka against Kirolbet Baskonia making his only three-point attempt in under 2 minutes of playing time.

On 10 October 2019, Akay signed a contract with the Serbian team Dynamic Belgrade. Following the 2020–21 season Akay declared for the 2021 NBA draft. On July 19, 2021, he withdrawn his name from consideration for the 2021 NBA draft.

On September 9, 2026, he signed with Körfez Basket of the Basketbol Süper Ligi (BSL).

== National team career ==
Akay was a member of the Turkey U16 national team that won the bronze medal at the 2016 FIBA U16 European Championship in Radom, Poland. Over seven tournament games, he averaged 2.3 points, 1.6 rebounds, and 1.9 assists per game.

== Career statistics ==
Legend
GP	Games played	GS	Games started	MPG	Minutes per game
FG%	Field-goal percentage	3P%	3-point field-goal percentage	FT%	Free-throw percentage
RPG	Rebounds per game	APG	Assists per game	SPG	Steals per game
BPG	Blocks per game	PPG	Points per game	PIR	Performance index rating
**Bold**	Career high

=== EuroLeague ===
Year	Team	GP	GS	MPG	FG%	3P%	FT%	RPG	APG	SPG	BPG	PPG	PIR
2018–19	Darüşşafaka	7	1	11.0	.412	.250	.556	1.1	1.6	.4	.0	3.0	1.3
