= 2017 VTB United League Playoffs =

Final games of the 2016-17 VTB United League

Tournament details
- Country: Russia (6 teams); Latvia (1 team); Kazakhstan (1 team)
- Dates: 1 May – 13 June 2017
- Teams: 8
- Defending champions: CSKA Moscow

Final positions
- Champions: CSKA Moscow
- Runners-up: Khimki
- EuroLeague: Khimki

The 2017 VTB United League Playoffs were the concluding games of the 2016–17 VTB United League to determine the season champions. The Playoffs started on May 1, 2017. The champions or the runners-up of the Playoffs qualified for the 2017–18 EuroLeague (depending on the spot of automatically qualified CSKA Moscow).

== Format ==
In the playoffs, a best-of-five games format is used. The team that wins the series will be the first team to win three games. The first two games will be played on the playing court of the four highest-place teams, the third game and, if necessary, the fourth, will be played on the playing court of the next four highest-place teams and the fifth game, if necessary, will be played on the playing court of the four highest-place teams.

== Qualified teams ==
Pos	Team	Pld	W	L	PF	PA	PD	PCT	Qualification
1	(Russia) CSKA Moscow	24	22	2	2274	1782	+492	.917	Seeded in quarterfinals
2	(Russia) Zenit Saint Petersburg	24	21	3	2187	1930	+257	.875	Seeded in quarterfinals
3	(Russia) Khimki	24	19	5	2108	1895	+213	.792	Seeded in quarterfinals
4	(Russia) Lokomotiv Kuban	24	19	5	1959	1688	+271	.792	Seeded in quarterfinals
5	(Russia) UNICS	24	15	9	2136	2021	+115	.625	Unseeded in quarterfinals
6	(Russia) Enisey	24	13	11	1974	2041	−67	.542	Unseeded in quarterfinals
7	(Latvia) VEF Rīga	24	11	13	1857	1961	−104	.458	Unseeded in quarterfinals
8	(Kazakhstan) Astana	24	9	15	1806	1930	−124	.375	Unseeded in quarterfinals

Source: VTB United League

== Bracket ==
Quarterfinals; 1–12 May
1	(Russia) CSKA Moscow	3
8	(Kazakhstan) Astana	0
4	(Russia) Lokomotiv Kuban	3
5	(Russia) UNICS	1
2	(Russia) Zenit Saint Petersburg	3
7	(Latvia) VEF Rīga	0
3	(Russia) Khimki	3
6	(Russia) Enisey	0

Semifinals; 25 May–4 June
1	(Russia) CSKA Moscow	3
4	(Russia) Lokomotiv Kuban	0
2	(Russia) Zenit Saint Petersburg	2
3	(Russia) Khimki	3

Finals; 8–13 June
1	(Russia) CSKA Moscow	3
3	(Russia) Khimki	0

== Quarterfinals ==
Team 1	Series	Team 2	Game 1	Game 2	Game 3	Game 4	Game 5
CSKA Moscow (Russia)	3–0	(Kazakhstan) Astana	77–54	94–74	91–73		
Lokomotiv Kuban (Russia)	3–1	(Russia) UNICS	62–71	92–76	83–71	84–79	
Zenit Saint Petersburg (Russia)	3–0	(Latvia) VEF Rīga	93–81	79–74	92–51		
Khimki (Russia)	3–0	(Russia) Enisey	91–84	109–81	89–68		

=== Game 1 ===
1 May 2017	Zenit Saint Petersburg (Russia)	93–81 (Series: 1–0)	(Latvia) VEF Rīga	Saint Petersburg
15:30 (UTC+3)	Scoring by quarter: 26–15, 24–26, 23–21, 20–19
	Pts: White 18; Rebs: Mbakwe 10; Asts: Marković 11; Eff: White 18	Boxscore	Pts: Blūms 16; Rebs: Gromovs, Mejeris 8 Asts: Šķēle 7 Eff: Mejeris 19	Arena: Yubileyny Sports Palace; Attendance: 3,150; Referees: Robert Vyklický (CZE), Tomislav Hordov (CRO), Aliaksandr Syrytsa (BLR)

4 May 2017	Khimki (Russia)	91–84 (Series: 1–0)	(Russia) Enisey	Khimki
19:30 (UTC+3)	Scoring by quarter: 14–23, 30–21, 22–25, 25–15
	Pts: Shved 33; Rebs: Todorović 10; Asts: Shved 5 Eff: Shved 28	Boxscore	Pts: Hilliard 18; Rebs: Elegar 13; Asts: Taylor 7 Eff: Elegar, Hilliard 19	Arena: Basketball Center of Moscow Region; Attendance: 1,500; Referees: Petri Mäntylä (FIN), Anton Makhlin (RUS), Sergey Beliakov (RUS)

5 May 2017	CSKA Moscow (Russia)	77–54 (Series: 1–0)	(Kazakhstan) Astana	Moscow
19:00 (UTC+3)	Scoring by quarter: 29–9, 18–14, 15–17, 15–14
	Pts: Fridzon 18; Rebs: Antonov 8 Asts: De Colo 5 Eff: Fridzon 20	Boxscore	Pts: Krubally 15; Rebs: Krubally 10; Asts: Katsivelis 5 Eff: Krubally 21	Arena: Universal Sports Hall CSKA; Attendance: 1,450; Referees: Siniša Herceg (CRO), Aare Halliko (EST), Rain Peerandi (EST)

5 May 2017	Lokomotiv Kuban (Russia)	62–71 (Series: 0–1)	(Russia) UNICS	Krasnodar
20:00 (UTC+3)	Scoring by quarter: 17–17, 14–20, 17–16, 14–18
	Pts: Rochestie 11; Rebs: Vougioukas 6 Asts: three players 2 Eff: Rochestie 9	Boxscore	Pts: Ponkrashov 15; Rebs: Parakhouski 10; Asts: Colom 8 Eff: Parakhouski 22	Arena: Basket-Hall; Attendance: 4,209; Referees: Sreten Radović (CRO), Anton Makhlin (RUS), Alexey Davydov (RUS)

=== Game 2 ===
3 May 2017	Zenit Saint Petersburg (Russia)	79–74 (Series: 2–0)	(Latvia) VEF Rīga	Saint Petersburg
20:00 (UTC+3)	Scoring by quarter: 10–18, 29–21, 20–14, 20–21
	Pts: Toolson, White 20; Rebs: Timma 7 Asts: Marković 8 Eff: White 21	Boxscore	Pts: Meiers 18; Rebs: Meiers 12; Asts: Blūms 5 Eff: Meiers 30	Arena: Yubileyny Sports Palace; Attendance: 3,014; Referees: Petri Mäntylä (FIN), Aare Halliko (EST), Tomasz Trawicki (POL)

6 May 2017	Khimki (Russia)	109–81 (Series: 2–0)	(Russia) Enisey	Khimki
18:00 (UTC+3)	Scoring by quarter: 22–24, 30–18, 31–22, 26–17
	Pts: Shved 26; Rebs: Todorović 8 Asts: Shved 7 Eff: Shved 28	Boxscore	Pts: Braimoh 23; Rebs: Braimoh 14; Asts: Zavoruev 7 Eff: Braimoh 31	Arena: Basketball Center of Moscow Region; Attendance: 1,550; Referees: Oļegs Latiševs (LAT), Ilya Putenko (RUS), Alexey Davydov (RUS)

7 May 2017	CSKA Moscow (Russia)	94–74 (Series: 2–0)	(Kazakhstan) Astana	Moscow
14:30 (UTC+3)	Scoring by quarter: 22–16, 23–16, 25–19, 24–23
	Pts: De Colo 15; Rebs: Augustine 5 Asts: Khryapa 5 Eff: De Colo 20	Boxscore	Pts: Lowery 19; Rebs: four players 4 Asts: Lowery 6 Eff: Lowery 27	Arena: Universal Sports Hall CSKA; Attendance: 1,200; Referees: Srđan Dožai (CRO), Jakub Zamojski (POL), Aliaksandr Syrytsa (BLR)

7 May 2017	Lokomotiv Kuban (Russia)	92–76 (Series: 1–1)	(Russia) UNICS	Krasnodar
16:00 (UTC+3)	Scoring by quarter: 28–18, 19–17, 26–24, 19–17
	Pts: Rochestie 26; Rebs: Broekhoff 12; Asts: three players 3 Eff: Broekhoff 34	Boxscore	Pts: Langford 24; Rebs: Langford 7 Asts: Ponkrashov 6 Eff: Langford 23	Arena: Basket-Hall; Attendance: 4,652; Referees: Saša Pukl (SLO), Tomislav Hordov (CRO), Ilya Putenko (RUS)

=== Game 3 ===
6 May 2017	VEF Rīga (Latvia)	51–92 (Series: 0–3)	(Russia) Zenit Saint Petersburg	Riga
17:00 (UTC+3)	Scoring by quarter: 25–29, 9–23, 9–16, 8–24
	Pts: Gordon, Meiers 10; Rebs: Meiers 8 Asts: Gordon 4 Eff: Meiers 16	Boxscore	Pts: Landry 20; Rebs: Pushkov 8 Asts: Karasev 6 Eff: Landry 24	Arena: Arēna Rīga; Attendance: 500; Referees: Siniša Herceg (CRO), Jakub Zamojski (POL), Rain Peerandi (EST)

9 May 2017	Enisey (Russia)	68–89 (Series: 0–3)	(Russia) Khimki	Krasnoyarsk
16:00 (UTC+7)	Scoring by quarter: 21–22, 18–27, 16–23, 13–17
	Pts: Hilliard 17; Rebs: Braimoh 5 Asts: Taylor 5 Eff: Hilliard 10	Boxscore	Pts: Shved 22; Rebs: Todorović 9 Asts: Zaitcev 4 Eff: Todorović 23	Arena: Arena Sever; Attendance: 1,800; Referees: Jakub Zamojski (POL), Sergei Krug (RUS), Sergei Mikhailov (RUS)

10 May 2017	Astana (Kazakhstan)	73–91 (Series: 0–3)	(Russia) CSKA Moscow	Astana
20:00 (UTC+6)	Scoring by quarter: 15–19, 10–25, 25–20, 23–27
	Pts: Lowery 23; Rebs: Krubally 9 Asts: Lowery 5 Eff: Lowery 25	Boxscore	Pts: De Colo 18; Rebs: Kurbanov 7 Asts: De Colo 8 Eff: De Colo 20	Arena: Barys Arena; Attendance: 845; Referees: Robert Vyklický (CZE), Ingus Baumanis (LAT), Mārtiņš Kozlovskis (LAT)

10 May 2017	UNICS (Russia)	71–83 (Series: 1–2)	(Russia) Lokomotiv Kuban	Kazan
19:00 (UTC+3)	Scoring by quarter: 19–19, 19–27, 18–15, 15–22
	Pts: Williams 16; Rebs: Williams 8 Asts: Colom 7 Eff: Williams 24	Boxscore	Pts: Rochestie 21; Rebs: three players 5 Asts: Rochestie 5 Eff: Vougioukas 21	Arena: Basket-Hall; Attendance: 2,000; Referees: Oļegs Latiševs (LAT), Marcin Kowalski (POL), Semen Ovinov (RUS)

=== Game 4 ===
12 May 2017	UNICS (Russia)	79–84 (Series: 1–3)	(Russia) Lokomotiv Kuban	Kazan
19:00 (UTC+3)	Scoring by quarter: 20–31, 25–19, 11–18, 23–16
	Pts: Langford 16; Rebs: Williams 10; Asts: Ponkrashov 7 Eff: Williams 15	Boxscore	Pts: Rochestie 21; Rebs: Vougioukas 7 Asts: three players 3 Eff: Rochestie 22	Arena: Basket-Hall; Attendance: 1,500; Referees: Jakub Zamojski (POL), Tomasz Trawicki (POL), Alexey Davydov (RUS)

== Semifinals ==
Team 1	Series	Team 2	Game 1	Game 2	Game 3	Game 4	Game 5
CSKA Moscow (Russia)	3–0	(Russia) Lokomotiv Kuban	101–95	84–71	74–66		
Zenit Saint Petersburg (Russia)	2–3	(Russia) Khimki	99–95	92–89	73–97	71–73	84–90

=== Game 1 ===
25 May 2017	Zenit Saint Petersburg (Russia)	99–95 (Series: 1–0)	(Russia) Khimki	Saint Petersburg
20:00 (UTC+3)	Scoring by quarter: 27–28, 19–16, 26–27, 27–24
	Pts: White 22; Rebs: White 7 Asts: Marković 9 Eff: White 27	Boxscore	Pts: Shved 31; Rebs: Hummel, Todorović 6 Asts: Shved 7 Eff: Shved 27	Arena: Yubileyny Sports Palace; Attendance: 4,326; Referees: Petri Mäntylä (FIN), Siniša Herceg (CRO), Semen Ovinov (RUS)

26 May 2017	CSKA Moscow (Russia)	101–95 (Series: 1–0)	(Russia) Lokomotiv Kuban	Moscow
19:30 (UTC+3)	Scoring by quarter: 26–22, 32–30, 19–18, 24–25
	Pts: De Colo 20; Rebs: Hines 5 Asts: De Colo 7 Eff: De Colo 23	Boxscore	Pts: Collins, Janning 21; Rebs: Vougioukas 4 Asts: Rochestie 5 Eff: Janning 22	Arena: Universal Sports Hall CSKA; Attendance: 4,000; Referees: Petri Mäntylä (FIN), Jurgis Laurinavičius (LTU), Anton Makhlin (RUS)

=== Game 2 ===
27 May 2017	Zenit Saint Petersburg (Russia)	92–89 (Series: 2–0)	(Russia) Khimki	Saint Petersburg
17:00 (UTC+3)	Scoring by quarter: 18–28, 22–21, 25–19, 27–21
	Pts: Toolson 24; Rebs: White 6 Asts: Marković 10; Eff: Toolson 29	Boxscore	Pts: Shved 23; Rebs: Todorović 6 Asts: Shved 12; Eff: Todorović 21	Arena: Yubileyny Sports Palace; Attendance: 4,660; Referees: Sreten Radović (CRO), Marcin Kowalski (POL), Alexey Davydov (RUS)

28 May 2017	CSKA Moscow (Russia)	84–71 (Series: 2–0)	(Russia) Lokomotiv Kuban	Moscow
17:30 (UTC+3)	Scoring by quarter: 20–15, 18–21, 25–21, 21–14
	Pts: Teodosić 20; Rebs: Khryapa 6 Asts: Khryapa, Kurbanov 4 Eff: Kurbanov 21	Boxscore	Pts: Broekhoff 24; Rebs: Collins 8 Asts: Janning 7 Eff: Broekhoff 24	Arena: Universal Sports Hall CSKA; Attendance: 3,500; Referees: Sreten Radović (CRO), Marcin Kowalski (POL), Ilya Putenko (RUS)

=== Game 3 ===
30 May 2017	Khimki (Russia)	97–73 (Series: 1–2)	(Russia) Zenit Saint Petersburg	Khimki
19:30 (UTC+3)	Scoring by quarter: 30–21, 26–25, 24–12, 17–15
	Pts: Shved 22; Rebs: Todorović 9 Asts: Shved 4 Eff: Shved 22	Boxscore	Pts: Karasev 14; Rebs: White 9 Asts: Marković 5 Eff: Marković 17	Arena: Basketball Center of Moscow Region; Attendance: 3,500; Referees: Fernando Rocha (POR), Jakub Zamojski (POL), Sergei Mikhailov (RUS)

31 May 2017	Lokomotiv Kuban (Russia)	66–74 (Series: 0–3)	(Russia) CSKA Moscow	Krasnodar
20:00 (UTC+3)	Scoring by quarter: 17–23, 14–20, 10–19, 25–12
	Pts: Collins 18; Rebs: Collins 6 Asts: Collins 4 Eff: Collins 19	Boxscore	Pts: Teodosić 16; Rebs: Jackson 6 Asts: Jackson 6 Eff: Jackson, Teodosić 17	Arena: Basket-Hall; Attendance: 7,139; Referees: Saša Pukl (SLO), Robert Vyklický (CZE), Semen Ovinov (RUS)

=== Game 4 ===
1 June 2017	Khimki (Russia)	73–71 (Series: 2–2)	(Russia) Zenit Saint Petersburg	Khimki
19:00 (UTC+3)	Scoring by quarter: 19–28, 19–5, 12–20, 23–18
	Pts: Shved 33; Rebs: Todorović 8 Asts: Zaitcev 3 Eff: Shved 21	Boxscore	Pts: Karasev 22; Rebs: three players 7 Asts: Karasev 5 Eff: Karasev 26	Arena: Basketball Center of Moscow Region; Attendance: 2,800; Referees: Saša Pukl (SLO), Damir Javor (SLO), Tomislav Hordov (CRO)

=== Game 5 ===
4 June 2017	Zenit Saint Petersburg (Russia)	84–90 (Series: 2–3)	(Russia) Khimki	Saint Petersburg
16:30 (UTC+3)	Scoring by quarter: 22–23, 13–16, 22–21, 27–30
	Pts: Landry 15; Rebs: Timma 7 Asts: Marković 7 Eff: Landry, Timma 17	Boxscore	Pts: Shved 28; Rebs: Hummel 8 Asts: Shved 6 Eff: Shved 21	Arena: Yubileyny Sports Palace; Attendance: 5,690; Referees: Ilija Belošević (SRB), Oļegs Latiševs (LAT), Piotr Pastusiak (POL)

== Finals ==
Team 1	Series	Team 2	Game 1	Game 2	Game 3	Game 4	Game 5
CSKA Moscow (Russia)	3–0	(Russia) Khimki	94–88	99–79	95–72		

=== Game 1 ===
8 June 2017	CSKA Moscow (Russia)	94–88 (Series: 1–0)	(Russia) Khimki	Moscow
19:30 (UTC+3)	Scoring by quarter: 18–13, 33–25, 27–13, 16–37
	Pts: De Colo 21; Rebs: Kurbanov 9 Asts: Teodosić 5 Eff: De Colo 21	Boxscore	Pts: Shved 18; Rebs: Hummel 6 Asts: Zaitcev 6 Eff: Zaitcev 24	Arena: Universal Sports Hall CSKA; Attendance: 4,500; Referees: Saša Pukl (SLO), Oļegs Latiševs (LAT), Anton Makhlin (RUS)

=== Game 2 ===
10 June 2017	CSKA Moscow (Russia)	99–79 (Series: 2–0)	(Russia) Khimki	Moscow
17:00 (UTC+3)	Scoring by quarter: 24–15, 35–28, 17–12, 23–24
	Pts: Teodosić 23; Rebs: Hines 9 Asts: Jackson 7 Eff: Teodosić 24	Boxscore	Pts: Shved 21; Rebs: Sokolov 9 Asts: Zaitcev 6 Eff: Zaitcev 20	Arena: Universal Sports Hall CSKA; Attendance: 4,500; Referees: Sreten Radović (CRO), Jakub Zamojski (POL), Semen Ovinov (RUS)

=== Game 3 ===
13 June 2017	(Russia) Khimki	72–95 (Series: 0–3)	(Russia) CSKA Moscow	Khimki
19:30 (UTC+3)	Scoring by quarter: 12–34, 22–22, 18–23, 20–16
	Pts: Shved 17; Rebs: Sokolov 7 Asts: Rowland 7 Eff: Rowland 17	Boxscore	Pts: De Colo 20; Rebs: Khryapa, Kurbanov 5 Asts: Teodosić 5 Eff: De Colo, Higgins 19	Arena: Basketball Center of Moscow Region; Attendance: 3,500; Referees: Ilija Belošević (SRB), Fernando Rocha (POR), Alexey Davydov (RUS)
