= Eurocup 2013–14 Regular Season Group G =

Standings and Results for Group G of the Regular Season phase of the 2013–14 Eurocup basketball tournament.

== Standings ==
	Team	Pld	W	L	PF	PA	Diff	Tie-break
1.	(Russia) Unics Kazan	10	10	0	837	625	+212	
2.	(Israel) Maccabi Haifa	10	6	4	744	745	–1	
3.	(Turkey) Banvit	10	5	5	795	718	+77	1–1 (+5)
4.	(Latvia) VEF Rīga	10	5	5	721	782	–61	1–1 (–5)
5.	(Estonia) BC Kalev/Cramo	10	3	7	673	764	–91	
6.	(North Macedonia) MZT Aerodrom	10	1	9	684	820	–136	

Source: Euroleague Basketball

== Fixtures and results ==
=== Game 1 ===
15 October 2013
17:00 CET

Boxscore

Banvit (Turkey)	86–60	(Estonia) BC Kalev/Cramo
Scoring by quarter: 25–22, 22–10, 23–14, 16–14
Pts: Mejia 15; Rebs: Davis 8 Asts: Rowland 8		Pts: Fall 16; Rebs: Elegar 10; Asts: Gibson 5

Banvit Kara Ali Acar Sport Hall, Bandırma
Attendance: 1,000
Referees: Sinisa Herceg (SLO), Sergey Chebyshev (UKR), Saverio Lanzarini (ITA)

15 October 2013
18:00 CET

Boxscore

VEF Rīga (Latvia)	80–71	(North Macedonia) MZT Aerodrom
Scoring by quarter: 14–11, 19–22, 23–23, 24–15
Pts: Bajramović 22; Rebs: Bajramović 9 Asts: Bajramović, Jahovičs 5		Pts: Lučić 15; Rebs: Davis 6 Asts: Davis 6

Arena Riga, Riga
Attendance: 2,000
Referees: Jurgis Laurinavicius (LTU), Sergio Silva (POR), Clemens Fritz (GER)

16 October 2013
18:00 CET

Boxscore

Maccabi Haifa (Israel)	67–75	(Russia) Unics Kazan
Scoring by quarter: 13–22, 16–24, 20–9, 18–20
Pts: Ofoegbu 15; Rebs: Kokia 8 Asts: Roth 8		Pts: Goudelock 22; Rebs: Kaimakoglou 9 Asts: Zisis 4

Romema Arena, Haifa
Attendance: 1,700
Referees: Paolo Taurino (ITA), Miroslav Tomov (BUL), Mario Majkic (SLO)

=== Game 2 ===
22 October 2013
17:00 CET

Boxscore

Unics Kazan (Russia)	72–71	(Turkey) Banvit
Scoring by quarter: 24–15, 14–19, 19–18, 15–19
Pts: McKee 15; Rebs: McKee 8 Asts: four players 3		Pts: Davis, Mejia 18; Rebs: Davis, Kuqo 6 Asts: Mejia 4

Basket Hall Arena, Kazan
Attendance: 3,500
Referees: Jose Ramon Garcia Ortiz (ESP), Igor Dragojevic (MNE), Oskars Lucis (LAT)

23 October 2013
18:00 CET

Boxscore

MZT Aerodrom (North Macedonia)	83–86	(Israel) Maccabi Haifa
Scoring by quarter: 29–21, 18–18, 20–23, 16–24
Pts: Stefan Sinovec, Gečevski 17; Rebs: Čekovski 7 Asts: Stefan Sinovec 6		Pts: Ofoegbu 18; Rebs: Ofoegbu 14; Asts: Cubillan 4

Boris Trajkovski, Skopje
Attendance: 2,218
Referees: Carmelo Paternico (ITA), Andrej Lovsin (SLO), Ersan Kartal (TUR)

23 October 2013
18:00 CET

Boxscore

BC Kalev/Cramo (Estonia)	62–67	(Latvia) VEF Rīga
Scoring by quarter: 12–17, 14–13, 21–18, 15–19
Pts: Fall 16; Rebs: Fall 8 Asts: Abbott 4		Pts: Janičenoks 14; Rebs: Nix 12; Asts: Bērziņš, Bajramović 2

Saku Suurhall, Tallinn
Attendance: 1,900
Referees: Boris Shulga (UKR), Petri Mantyla (FIN), Carlos Peruga (ESP)

=== Game 3 ===
29 October 2013
18:00 CET

Boxscore

BC Kalev/Cramo (Estonia)	72–81	(Russia) Unics Kazan
Scoring by quarter: 12–31, 21–12, 21–20, 18–18
Pts: Elegar 19; Rebs: Elegar 9 Asts: three players 2		Pts: Goudelock 20; Rebs: Kaimakoglou 7 Asts: Goudelock 4

Saku Suurhall, Tallinn
Attendance: 2,200
Referees: Nicola Maestre (FRA), Apostolos Kalpakas (SWE), Jurgis Laurinavicius (LTU)

30 October 2013
18:00 CET

Boxscore

Banvit (Turkey)	85–61	(North Macedonia) MZT Aerodrom
Scoring by quarter: 22–17, 23–11, 17–17, 23–16
Pts: Mejia 19; Rebs: Gordon, Mejia 8 Asts: Veyseloğlu 4		Pts: Čekovski 13; Rebs: Čekovski 7 Asts: Markovski 4

Banvit Kara Ali Acar Sport Hall, Bandırma
Attendance: 2,700
Referees: Seffi Shemmesh (ISR), Marius Ciulin (ROM), Alexandri Olaru (ROM)

30 October 2013
18:30 CET

Boxscore

VEF Rīga (Latvia)	73–94	(Israel) Maccabi Haifa
Scoring by quarter: 23–21, 12–26, 20–23, 18–24
Pts: Derrick Nix 14; Rebs: Derrick Nix 9 Asts: Brown 6		Pts: Roth 22; Rebs: Smith 18; Asts: Smith 10

Arena Riga, Riga
Attendance: 3,700
Referees: Eddie Viator (FRA), Sergiy Chebyshev (UKR), Semen Ovinov (RUS)

=== Game 4 ===
6 November 2013
18:00 CET

Boxscore

Maccabi Haifa (Israel)	72–69	(Turkey) Banvit
Scoring by quarter: 17-18, 20-17, 16-23, 19-11
Pts: Smith 20; Rebs: Randle 10; Asts: Roth 10		Pts: Rowland 20; Rebs: Mejia 8 Asts: Marković 5

Romema Arena, Haifa
Attendance: 1,200
Referees: Guerrino Cerebuch (ITA), Zdravko Rutesic (NME), Uros Obrknezevic (SRB)

6 November 2013
18:00 CET

Boxscore

MZT Aerodrom (North Macedonia)	79–70	(Estonia) BC Kalev/Cramo
Scoring by quarter: 15-17, 18-18, 23-18, 23-17
Pts: Gečevski 16; Rebs: Čekovski 7 Asts: Gečevski, Otašević 3		Pts: Abbott 14; Rebs: Šķēle, Gibson, Elegar 4 Asts: Abbott, Gibson 2

Boris Trajkovski, Skopje
Attendance: 646
Referees: Milivoje Jovcic (SRB), Emin Mogulkoc (TUR), Haris Bijedic (BIH)

6 November 2013
18:30 CET

Boxscore

VEF Rīga (Latvia)	68–86	(Russia) Unics Kazan
Scoring by quarter: 19-18, 18-24, 14-24, 17-20
Pts: Bajramović 17; Rebs: Nix 9 Asts: Brown 5		Pts: Vougioukas 23; Rebs: Kurbanov, Veremeenko 8 Asts: Zisis, Goudelock 4

Arena Riga, Riga
Attendance: 1,000
Referees: Maerk CmikiIewicz (POL), Oscar Perea (ESP), Gintaras Vitkauskas (LTU)

=== Game 5 ===
13 November 2013
16:00 CET

Boxscore

Unics Kazan (Russia)	85–61	(North Macedonia) MZT Aerodrom
Scoring by quarter: 29–13, 19–12, 21–23, 16–13
Pts: Goudelock 20; Rebs: Harangody, Vougioukas 6 Asts: Eidson 4		Pts: Davis 12; Rebs: Reynolds 5 Asts: Kostoski 5

Basket Hall Arena, Kazan
Attendance: 3,500
Referees: Tomasz Trawicki (POL), Arnis Ozols (LAT), David Romano (ISR)

13 November 2013
18:00 CET

Boxscore

Banvit (Turkey)	83–64	(Latvia) VEF Rīga
Scoring by quarter: 22–14, 17–11, 26–17, 18–22
Pts: Davis, Mejia 15; Rebs: Prepelič 9 Asts: Mejia, Marković 6		Pts: Bajramović 12; Rebs: Strēlnieks 5 Asts: Bērziņš, Brown 5

Banvit Kara Ali Acar Sport Hall, Bandırma
Attendance: 3,000
Referees: Andrej Jersan (SLO), Matej Boltauzer (SLO), Gianluca Mattioli (ITA)

13 November 2013
18:00 CET

Boxscore

BC Kalev/Cramo (Estonia)	64–68	(Israel) Maccabi Haifa
Scoring by quarter: 23–15, 22–13, 6–16, 13–24
Pts: Abbott 14; Rebs: Elegar 10; Asts: Sokk 6		Pts: Smith 21; Rebs: Ofoegbu, Smith 6 Asts: Roth, Smith 5

Saku Suurhall, Tallinn
Attendance: 2,000
Referees: Oļegs Latiševs (LAT), Oskars Lucis (LAT), Ilya Putenko (RUS)

=== Game 6 ===
20 November 2013
16:00 CET

Boxscore

Unics Kazan (Russia)	79–58	(Israel) Maccabi Haifa
Scoring by quarter: 24–20, 19–16, 17–12, 19–10
Pts: Goudelock 18; Rebs: Harangody 10; Asts: Goudelock 5		Pts: Randle 17; Rebs: Smith 11; Asts: Smith, Roth 5

Basket Hall Arena, Kazan
Attendance: 3,500
Referees: Rustu Nuran (TUR), Petros Papapetrou (GRE), Tomislav Hordov (CRO)

20 November 2013
18:00 CET

Boxscore

MZT Aerodrom (North Macedonia)	70–77	(Latvia) VEF Rīga
Scoring by quarter: 17-19, 21-22, 15-19, 17-17
Pts: Stojanovski 22; Rebs: Stojanovski 12; Asts: Čekovski 4		Pts: Bajramović 16; Rebs: Robinson 9 Asts: Brown 8

Boris Trajkovski, Skopje
Attendance: 1,000
Referees: Andrej Lovsin (SLO), Murat Biricik (TUR), Carlos Peruga (ESP)

20 November 2013
18:00 CET

Boxscore

BC Kalev/Cramo (Estonia)	75–72	(Turkey) Banvit
Scoring by quarter: 17-17, 23-21, 20-11, 15-23
Pts: Sokk 15; Rebs: Elegar 7 Asts: Armands Šķēle 5		Pts: Rowland 20; Rebs: Mejia 8 Asts: Rowland 5

Saku Suurhall, Tallinn
Attendance: 1,400
Referees: Dani Hierrezuelo (ESP), Carlos Cortes (ESP), Arnis Ozols (EST)

=== Game 7 ===
27 November 2013
18:00 CET

Boxscore

Banvit (Turkey)	71–79	(Russia) Unics Kazan
Scoring by quarter: 16-20, 14-16, 19-21, 22-22
Pts: Rowland 19; Rebs: Davis 7 Asts: Mejia, Davis 3		Pts: Goudelock 22; Rebs: Eidson 10; Asts: Zisis 8

Banvit Kara Ali Acar Sport Hall, Bandırma
Attendance: 3,000
Referees: Robert Lottermoser (GER), Radomir Vojinovic (MNE), Alexandar Glisic (SRB)

27 November 2013
18:30 CET

Boxscore

VEF Rīga (Latvia)	78–67	(Estonia) BC Kalev/Cramo
Scoring by quarter: 18-13, 19-16, 16-21, 25-17
Pts: Bajramović 18; Rebs: Bajramović 6 Asts: Brown 6		Pts: Moldoveanu 16; Rebs: Elegar 9 Asts: Gibson 5

Arena Riga, Riga
Attendance: 1,000
Referees: Peter Obradovic (BIH), Renaud Geller (BEL), Simon Ovinov (RUS)

27 November 2013
18:30 CET

Boxscore

Maccabi Haifa (Israel)	79–60	(North Macedonia) MZT Aerodrom
Scoring by quarter: 21-18, 24-19, 17-10, 17-13
Pts: Ofoegbu, Kozikaro 14; Rebs: Kozikaro 9 Asts: Smith8		Pts: Reynolds 20; Rebs: Reynolds 9 Asts: Kostoski, Otašević 4

Romema Arena, Haifa
Attendance: 1,300
Referees: Sinica Herceg (CRO), Gianluca Mattioli (ITA), Jurgis Laurinavicius (LTU)

=== Game 8 ===
4 December 2013
16:00 CET

Boxscore

Unics Kazan (Russia)	94–44	(Estonia) BC Kalev/Cramo
Scoring by quarter: 26-7, 23–19, 20–14, 25–4
Pts: Goudelock 18; Rebs: Harangody 10; Asts: Eidson 6		Pts: Fall 13; Rebs: Moldoveanu 7 Asts: Gibson 2

Basket Hall, Kazan
Attendance: 3,500
Referees: Eddie Viator (FRA), Apostolos Kalpakas (SWE), Aleksandar Milojevic(MKD)

4 December 2013
18:00 CET

Boxscore

(North Macedonia) MZT Aerodrom	68–86	Banvit (Turkey)
Scoring by quarter: 22-21, 18-19, 11-15, 17-31
Pts: Gečevski 12; Rebs: Gečevski 5 Asts: Otašević 4		Pts: Davis 21; Rebs: Kuqo 6 Asts: Rowland 6

Boris Trajkovski, Skopje
Attendance: 1,187
Referees: Luigi Lamonica (ITA), Soto Petek (SLO), Alexandru Olare (ROM)

4 December 2013
18:00 CET

Boxscore

Maccabi Haifa (Israel)	74–72	VEF Rīga (Latvia)
Scoring by quarter: 24-11, 21–18, 11-19, 18-24
Pts: Randle, Dagen Yavzuri 16; Rebs: Smith, Ike Ofoegbu 9 Asts: Smith, Roth 4		Pts: Janičenoks 17; Rebs: Bērziņš 8 Asts: Derrick Nix 3

Romema Arena, Haifa
Attendance: 1,900
Referees: Jose Martin (ESP), Marko Juras (SRB), Sergio Silva (ITA)

=== Game 9 ===
11 December 2013
16:00 CET

Boxscore

Unics Kazan (Russia)	98–51	(Latvia) VEF Rīga
Scoring by quarter: 19–13, 19–12, 30–18, 30–8
Pts: Harangody 16; Rebs: Harangody 7 Asts: McKee 8		Pts: Bajramović, Robinson 11; Rebs: three players 6 Asts: Brown 4

Basket Hall Arena, Kazan
Attendance: 3,500
Referees: Sreten Radovic (CRO), Omer Esteron (ISR), Jasmina Juras (SRB)

11 December 2013
18:00 CET

Boxscore

Banvit (Turkey)	95–76	(Israel) Maccabi Haifa
Scoring by quarter: 25–19, 27–18, 27–14, 16–25
Pts: Davis 20; Rebs: Cantekin, Kuqo 5 Asts: Marković 6		Pts: Ofoegbu 17; Rebs: Kokia 7 Asts: Cubillán, Smith 3

Banvit Kara Ali Acar Sport Hall, Bandırma
Attendance: 2,700
Referees: Juan Carlos Arteaga (ESP), Petar Obradovic (BIH), Mario Majkic (SLO)

11 December 2013
18:00 CET

Boxscore

BC Kalev/Cramo (Estonia)	84–69	(North Macedonia) MZT Aerodrom
Scoring by quarter: 17–14, 30–15, 24–18, 13–22
Pts: Abbott 25; Rebs: Fall 7 Asts: Gibson, Sokk 4		Pts: Sinovec 12; Rebs: Reynolds 10; Asts: Stajic 6

Saku Suurhall, Tallinn
Attendance: 1,000
Referees: Juan Carlos Garcia Gonzalez (ESP), Ersan Kartal (TUR), Clements Fritz (GER)

=== Game 10 ===
18 December 2013
18:00 CET

Boxscore

MZT Aerodrom (North Macedonia)	62–88	(Russia) Unics Kazan
Scoring by quarter: 25–29, 9–23, 13–23, 15–13
Pts: Marinković, Stojanovski 12; Rebs: three players 4 Asts: Kostoski 3		Pts: Goudelock 19; Rebs: Harangody 7 Asts: Zisis 6

Boris Trajkovski, Skopje
Attendance: 2,500
Referees: Nicola Maestre (FRA), Gentian Cici (ALB), Moritz Reiter (GER)

18 December 2013
18:30 CET

Boxscore

VEF Rīga (Latvia)	91–77	(Turkey) Banvit
Scoring by quarter: 21–15, 19–25, 21–18, 30–19
Pts: Davis 19; Rebs: Davis, Mejia 6 Asts: Marković 6		Pts: Brown 22; Rebs: Robinson 14; Asts: Brown 11

Arena Riga, Riga
Attendance: 1,200
Referees: Ilija Belosevic (SRB), Benjamin Jimenez (ESP), Markos Michaelides (SUI)

18 December 2013
19:00 CET

Boxscore

Maccabi Haifa (Israel)	70–75	(Estonia) BC Kalev/Cramo
Scoring by quarter: 15–23, 15–22, 24–15, 16–15
Pts: Rice 18; Rebs: Smith 9 Asts: Smith 6		Pts: Moldoveanu 19; Rebs: Elegar 12; Asts: Sokk 5

Romema Arena, Haifa
Attendance: 1,300
Referees: Murat Biricik (TUR), Sasa Maricic (SRB), Tomislav Hordov (BUL)
