= VTB United League All-Star Game =

The VTB United League All-Star Game is an annual basketball event that includes an exhibition game in which the best selected players of the VTB United League play against each other. The inaugural edition was organised on February 11, 2017, during the 2016–17 season. The VTB All-Star Games also includes a dunk contest and a three-point contest.

== Games ==
Year	Date	Arena	Team 1	Score	Team 2	MVP
2017	11 February	Bolshoy Ice Dome, Sochi	(Russia); Russian Stars	131–121	World Stars	(Russia); Andrey Vorontsevich
2018	17 February	Yubileyny Sports Palace, Saint Petersburg	(Russia); Russian Stars	125–124	World Stars	(Russia); Sergey Karasev
2019	17 February	VTB Arena, Moscow	(Russia); Russian Stars	115–118	World Stars	(Spain); Sergio Rodríguez
2020	16 February	VTB Arena, Moscow	(Russia); Russian Stars	162–164	World Stars	(Russia); Alexey Shved
2021	14 February	VTB Arena, Moscow	(Russia); Russian Stars	183– 162	World Stars	(Russia); Vitaly Fridzon
2022	20 February	VTB Arena, Moscow	(Russia); Russian Stars	121–129	World Stars	(Croatia); Mario Hezonja
2023	19 February	VTB Arena, Moscow	Old School	148–140	New School	(Senegal); Malik Dime
2024	18 February	VTB Arena, Moscow	Emil Rajković team	120–134	Xavi Pascual team	(United States); DeVaughn Akoon-Purcell
2025	16 February	VTB Arena, Moscow	(Russia); Hozyaeva team	124–107	Gosti team	(Russia); Nikita Kurbanov

== Slam-Dunk champions ==
Year	Player	Team
2017	(Latvia) Jānis Timma	Zenit Saint Petersburg
2018	(United States) Frank Elegar	Lokomotiv Kuban
2019	(Russia) Vyacheslav Zaytsev	Khimki Moscow
2020	(Russia) Aleksandr Petenev	Avtodor Saratov
2021	(United States) Tyus Battle	Enisey
2022	(Croatia) Mario Hezonja	UNICS
2023	(Russia) Samson Ruzhentsev	Parma
2024	(United States) Jordan Skipper-Brown	Astana
2025	(Russia) Vladislav Perevalov	Enisey

== Three-point contest winners ==
Year	Player	Team
2017	(Russia) Sergey Karasev	Zenit Saint Petersburg
2018	(Australia) Ryan Broekhoff	Lokomotiv Kuban
2019	(Russia) Vitaly Fridzon	Lokomotiv Kuban
2020	(Russia) Vitaly Fridzon (2)	Lokomotiv Kuban
2021	(Russia) Artem Komolov	Nizhny Novgorod
2022	(United States) Billy Baron	Zenit Saint Petersburg
2023	(United States) Dallas Moore	CSKA
2024	(United States) Beau Beech	Enisey
2025	(United States) Garrett Nevels	Parma

== Topscorers ==
Season	Player	Points	Team
2017	(Russia) Andrey Vorontsevich	28	PBC CSKA Moscow
2018	(Russia) Sergey Karasev	26	BC Zenit Saint Petersburg
2019	(Russia) Andrey Vorontsevich	30	PBC CSKA Moscow
2020	(United States) Mike James	34	PBC CSKA Moscow
2021	(Russia) Vitaly Fridzon	57	BC Zenit Saint Petersburg
2022	(Croatia) Mario Hezonja	29	UNICS Kazan
2023	(Russia) Andrey Martyuk	34	BC Zenit Saint Petersburg
2024	(Trinidad and Tobago) (United States) DeVaughn Akoon-Purcell	44	Lokomotiv Kuban
2025	(Trinidad and Tobago) (United States) DeVaughn Akoon-Purcell	22	UNICS Kazan

== Players with most appearances ==
Player	All-Star	Editions	MVP	Notes
(Russia) Nikita Kurbanov	7	2018, 2019, 2020, 2021, 2022, 2023, 2025	2025	
(Russia) Andrey Vorontsevich	7	2017, 2018, 2019, 2022, 2023, 2024, 2025	2017	
(Russia) Dmitry Kulagin	5	2018, 2019, 2020, 2022, 2024	-	
(Russia) Alexey Shved	4	2017, 2020, 2021, 2022	2020	
(Russia) Dmitry Khvostov	4	2017, 2018, 2019, 2020	-	
(Russia) Vitaly Fridzon	4	2019, 2020, 2021, 2023	2021	
(Russia) Sergei Monia	4	2017, 2018, 2019, 2020	-	
(France) Nando de Colo	2	2017, 2018	-	
