= List of VTB United League season rebounding leaders =

In basketball, a rebound is the act of gaining possession of the ball after a missed field goal or free throw. An offensive rebound occurs when a player recovers the ball after their own or a teammate's missed shot attempt, while a defensive rebound occurs when a player recovers the ball after an opponent's missed shot attempt. The VTB United League's rebounding title is awarded to the player with the highest rebounds per game average in a given regular season.

== Rebounding leaders ==
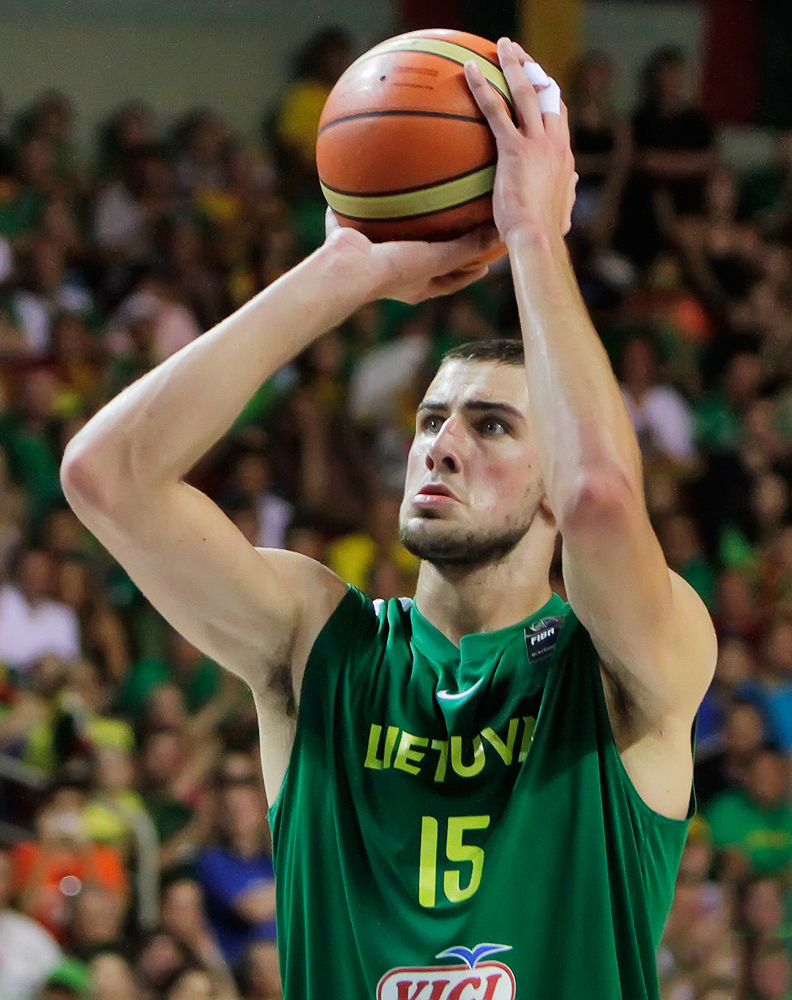
Jonas Valančiūnas was the league's rebounding leader in 2012

Season	Player	Pos.	Nationality	Team	RPG	Ref(s)
2009–10	Travis Watson	PF	United States	Žalgiris	10.20	
2010–11	Shawn King	C	Saint Vincent and the Grenadines	Minsk-2006	8.80	
2011–12	Jonas Valančiūnas	C	Lithuania	Lietuvos rytas	8.00	
2012–13	Aleks Marić	C	Australia	Lokomotiv-Kuban	8.53	
2013–14	Frank Elegar	C	US Virgin Islands	Kalev/Cramo	8.44	
2014–15	Frank Elegar (2)	C	US Virgin Islands	Kalev/Cramo	11.28	
2015–16	Josh Boone	C	United States	Khimki	9.12	
2016–17	Frank Elegar (3)	C	US Virgin Islands	Enisey	8.95	
2017–18	Ike Udanoh	PF	United States	Astana	8.50	
2018–19	Jalen Reynolds	C	United States	Zenit Saint Petersburg	8.17	
2019–20	Dušan Ristić	C	Serbia	Astana	10.91	
2020–21	Derek Cooke	C	United States	Minsk	7.84	
2021–22	Nikola Milutinov	C	Serbia	CSKA Moscow	9.91	
2022–23	Nikola Milutinov	C	Serbia	CSKA Moscow	8.54	
