= Danilo Anđušić =

Serbian basketball player (born 1991)

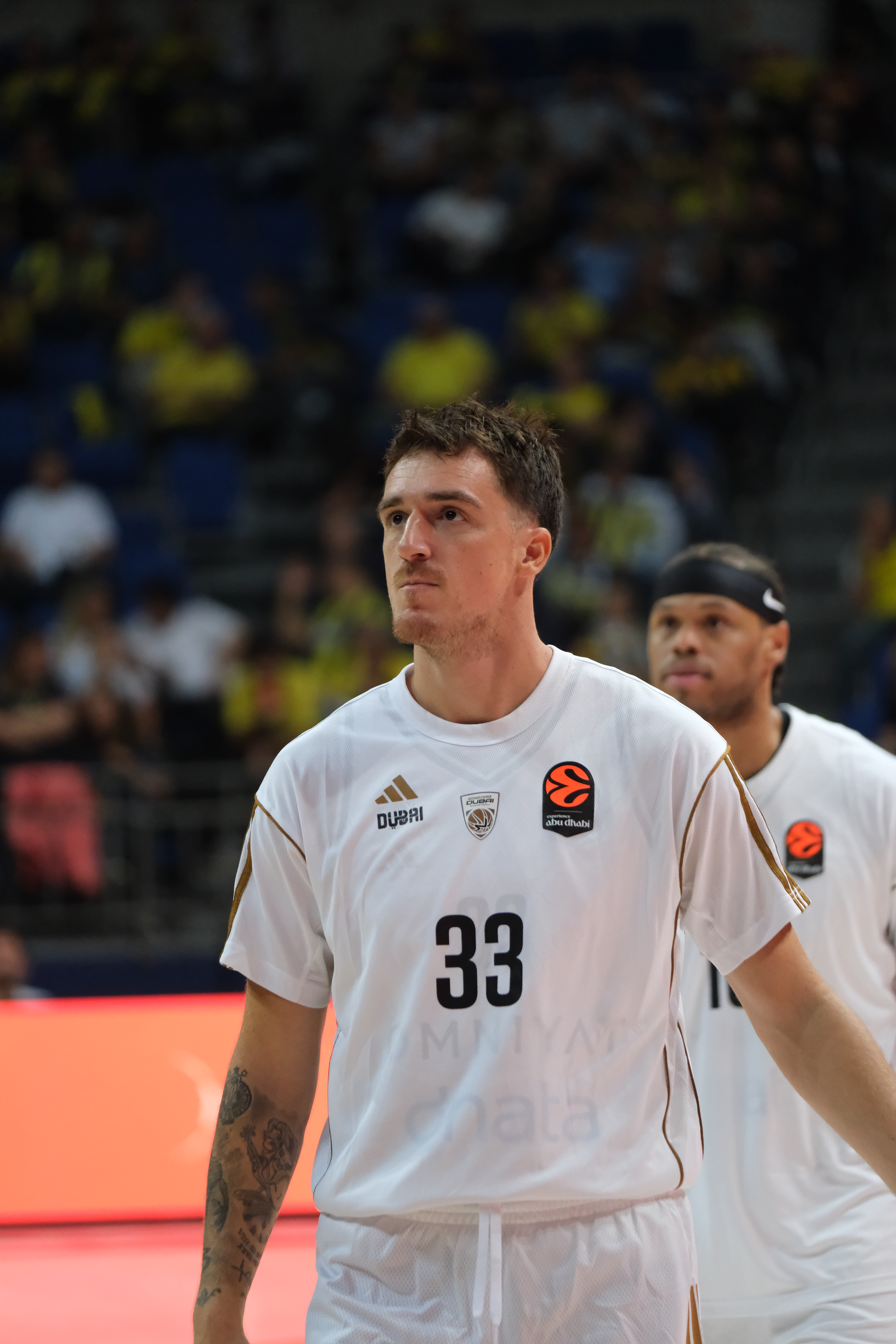
- Anđušić with Dubai Basketball in 2025

No. 33 – Aris Thessaloniki
- Position: Shooting guard
- League: GBL

Personal information
- Born: 22 April 1991 (age 35) Belgrade, Republic of Serbia, Yugoslavia
- Listed height: 1.95 m (6 ft 5 in)
- Listed weight: 92 kg (203 lb)

Career information
- NBA draft: 2013: undrafted
- Playing career: 2009–present

Career history
- 2009–2011: Hemofarm
- 2009–2010: →Mega Vizura
- 2011–2012: Partizan
- 2013–2014: Virtus Bologna
- 2013–2014: →Valladolid
- 2014–2015: Bilbao
- 2015: Partizan
- 2016: Anwil Włocławek
- 2016–2017: Parma
- 2017–2018: UNICS Kazan
- 2018–2019: Igokea
- 2019–2021: JL Bourg
- 2021–2022: AS Monaco
- 2022–2024: Partizan
- 2024–2025: Dubai Basketball
- 2025–present: Aris Thessaloniki

Career highlights
- LNB Pro A Top Scorer (2021); All-LNB Pro A First Team (2021); ABA League champion (2023); Serbian League champion (2012); Serbian Cup winner (2012); Serbian Cup MVP (2012); Bosnian Cup winner (2019); VTB United League All-Star (2017)
Medals
Men's basketball
Representing Serbia
U18 European Championship
Gold medal – first place	2009 France	U18 National Team
U16 European Championship
Gold medal – first place	2007 Greece	U16 National Team

Danilo Anđušić (Serbian: Данило Анђушић; born 22 April 1991) is a Serbian professional basketball player for Aris Thessaloniki of the Greek Basketball League (GBL). He has also represented the Serbian national team in international competition.

== Professional career ==
=== Hemofarm (2009–11) ===
Anđušić joined Hemofarm youth academy at the age of 15. In 2009, Anđušić signed his first professional contract with Hemofarm, but was immediately loaned to Mega Vizura for the 2009–10 season. In March 2010, after the end of the Basketball League of Serbia first phase, Anđušić returned to Hemofarm. On 16 June 2010, in the second game of the playoff final, Anđušić was involved in the brawl against Partizan. In the 2010–11 season, he also played for Hemofarm.

=== Partizan (2011–12) ===
In September 2011, Anđušić officially moved to Partizan, signing a four-year contract. In December 2012, Anđušić requested contract termination from the team, unsatisfied with the playing role and little playing time over the season. On 28 December 2012, Anđušić and Partizan agreed to part ways.

=== Virtus and Spanish League stints (2013–15) ===
On February 13, 2013, he signed a four-year deal with Virtus Bologna. In October 2013, he was loaned to CB Valladolid for the 2013–14 season. In August 2014, he signed a two-year deal with Bilbao Basket. In July 2015, he parted ways with Bilbao.

=== Short term with Partizan ===
On October 14, 2015, Anđušić signed with Partizan until January, returning to the club for a second stint. He also has an option to extend until the end of the season. Following the expiration of his contract, on December 30, 2015, he parted ways with the club. On January 5, 2016, he signed with the Polish club Anwil Włocławek for the rest of the season.

=== Russian League stints (2016–18) ===
On September 17, 2016, Anđušić signed a one-year deal with the Russian team Parma Basket. He appeared in 15 games of the 2016–17 VTB United League season with Parma, averaging 19.8 points, 3.8 rebounds and 3.7 assists. On February 7, 2017, he left Parma and signed a deal with UNICS Kazan until the end of 2017–18 season. In 6 games he played with UNICS in the VTB United League until the end of the season he averaged 6.3 points and 1.5 assists, while in the 2016–17 EuroLeague, he appeared in 8 games, averaging 5 points, 1.4 rebounds and 1 assist per game.

In 2017–18 season, his role in UNICS dropped as he made only 5 appearances in the 2017–18 VTB United League season and averaged only 2.2 points per game.

=== Igokea (2018–19) ===
In November 2018, Anđušić signed a contract with the Bosnian team Igokea. Over 15 ABA League games, he averaged 11.3 points, 2.5 rebounds and 1.8 assists, while shooting 39.4% from the field.

=== French League stints (2019–22) ===
On September 25, 2019, he signed a contract with the French team JL Bourg of LNB Pro A. On September 29, he debuted for the team and scored 31 points in win over Élan Béarnais.

On July 6, 2021, Anđušić signed with AS Monaco of the French LNB Pro A and the EuroLeague. On June 28, 2022, he parted ways with the French club.

=== Third term with Partizan (2022–2024) ===
On June 30, 2022, he returned to Partizan for a third stint with the Serbian powerhouse. During the 2022–23 season, Partizan was eliminated from the Real Madrid in tight playoffs series. Over the season, Anđušić averaged 6.5 points, 1.2 assists and 1 rebound, while shooting career-best 46.3 percent from the field in the EuroLeague. Partizan ended the 2022–23 season by lifting the ABA League championship trophy, after 3–2 score against Crvena zvezda in the Finals series.

Over the 2023–24 season, Anđušić averaged 5 points and 1.1 rebounds over 28 EuroLeague games. The season was deemed to be unsuccessful for Partizan as they finished the season without lifting any trophy.

=== Dubai (2024–2025) ===
On July 23, 2024, Anđušić signed a two-year contract with Dubai Basketball, the newcomer to the ABA League. Over 36 games, he averaged 11 points, 2.2 rebounds and 1.8 assists on 40.9% shooting from the field. Dubai finished the season with loss in the semifinals series to Partizan Belgrade.

=== Aris Thessaloniki (2025–present) ===
On 18 November 2025, Anđušić signed with Aris.

== Serbian national team ==
Anđušić played with the senior men's Serbian national basketball team at the EuroBasket 2013.

== Career statistics ==
Legend
GP	Games played	GS	Games started	MPG	Minutes per game
FG%	Field-goal percentage	3P%	3-point field-goal percentage	FT%	Free-throw percentage
RPG	Rebounds per game	APG	Assists per game	SPG	Steals per game
BPG	Blocks per game	PPG	Points per game	PIR	Performance index rating
**Bold**	Career high

=== EuroLeague ===
Year	Team	GP	GS	MPG	FG%	3P%	FT%	RPG	APG	SPG	BPG	PPG	PIR
2011–12	Partizan	10	0	7.6	.292	.227	.875	.7	.4	.2	—	3.3	2.6
2012–13	Partizan	7	0	7.9	.261	.143	**1.000**	.6	.7	.3	—	2.3	1.0
2016–17	UNICS	8	1	15.1	.361	.316	.727	**1.4**	1.0	**.5**	—	5.0	2.5
2021–22	Monaco	**30**	**6**	**16.3**	.420	.423	.873	1.3	.9	.3	.0	**7.7**	**6.1**
2022–23	Partizan	26	4	13.1	**.463**	**.424**	.857	1.0	**1.2**	.3	**.1**	6.5	5.1
2023–24	Partizan	28	3	13.1	.420	.400	.947	1.1	.6	.2	**.1**	5.0	4.8
2025–26	Dubai	1	0	4.0	.000	.000	**1.000**	.0	.0	.0	.0	2.0	.0
Career		110	14	13.2	.409	.375	.878	1.1	.8	.3	.1	5.8	4.6

=== EuroCup ===
Year	Team	GP	GS	MPG	FG%	3P%	FT%	RPG	APG	SPG	BPG	PPG	PIR
2010–11	Hemofarm	9	2	11.8	.419	**.353**	.750	1.6	.8	.2	**.1**	4.6	4.9
2017–18	UNICS	**15**	0	9.9	.400	.263	.833	1.3	.5	.4	—	3.5	3.3
2020–21	JL Bourg	**15**	**15**	**28.6**	**.434**	.341	**.907**	**2.4**	**3.1**	**.8**	**.1**	**17.4**	**17.7**
Career		39	17	17.5	.426	.331	.882	1.8	1.6	.5	.1	9.1	9.2

=== Domestic leagues ===
Year	Team	League	GP	MPG	FG%	3P%	FT%	RPG	APG	SPG	BPG	PPG
2009–10	(Serbia) Mega	KLS	23	23.3	.373	.268	.859	1.9	1.6	.9	.0	10.9
2009–10	(Serbia) Hemofarm	KLS	14	14.7	.350	.346	.857	1.0	1.5	1.3	.3	4.8
2010–11	(Serbia) Hemofarm	KLS	18	14.9	.363	.354	.826	1.4	1.3	.8	.1	6.3
2010–11	(Serbia) Hemofarm	ABA	21	11.7	.319	.300	.808	.9	.9	.5	—	3.7
2011–12	(Serbia) Partizan	KLS	20	17.4	.380	.386	.860	1.0	1.9	.4	.0	7.7
2011–12	(Serbia) Partizan	ABA	24	12.9	.444	.403	.813	1.0	1.1	.4	.0	5.6
2012–13	(Serbia) Partizan	KLS	1	4.0	—	—	—	—	—	—	—	0.0
2012–13	(Serbia) Partizan	ABA	12	10.7	.370	.320	.871	.8	1.1	.4	.1	5.7
2012–13	(Italy) Virtus Bologna	LBA	9	17.0	.422	.414	.875	2.0	.4	.3	—	6.3
2013–14	(Spain) Valladolid	ACB	32	25.1	.386	.374	.786	1.8	1.0	.8	.1	11.7
2014–15	(Spain) Bilbao	ACB	35	14.6	.335	.236	.842	.8	.6	.3	.0	5.1
2015–16	(Serbia) Partizan	ABA	11	16.2	.365	.242	.875	1.7	1.2	.4	.1	6.8
2015–16	(Poland) Włocławek	PLK	27	19.9	.393	.333	.848	2.8	1.1	.7	.0	9.4
2016–17	(Russia) Parma	VTBUL	15	31.1	.451	.344	.886	3.8	3.5	1.2	.3	19.8
2016–17	(Russia) UNICS	VTBUL	6	16.6	.353	.350	1.000	.5	1.5	.3	.2	6.3
2017–18	(Russia) UNICS	VTBUL	5	8.4	.333	.333	.833	.2	—	.2	—	2.2
2018–19	(Bosnia and Herzegovina) Igokea	ABA	15	21.8	.394	.333	.795	2.5	1.8	.7	.2	11.3
2019–20	(France) JL Bourg	LNB Élite	24	29.1	.459	.455	.835	3.3	3.6	1.4	.1	16.0
2020–21	(France) JL Bourg	LNB Élite	31	30.4	.443	.409	.882	2.8	3.2	.9	.4	20.0
2021–22	(France) Monaco	LNB Élite	24	19.4	.405	.324	.893	1.7	1.8	.7	.1	10.2
2022–23	(Serbia) Partizan	ABA	31	14.5	.418	.379	.816	1.1	1.5	.2	.1	7.5
2023–24	(Serbia) Partizan	KLS	1	24.0	.429	.353	.714	1.7	1.3	1.7	—	13.3
2023–24	(Serbia) Partizan	ABA	25	16.5	.493	.448	.920	1.3	1.0	.8	.0	9.3

== Personal life ==
In 2015, he married Serbian sport shooter Ivana Maksimović.

== See also ==
- List of Serbia men's national basketball team players
