= Robert Lowery (basketball) =

American basketball player (born 1987)

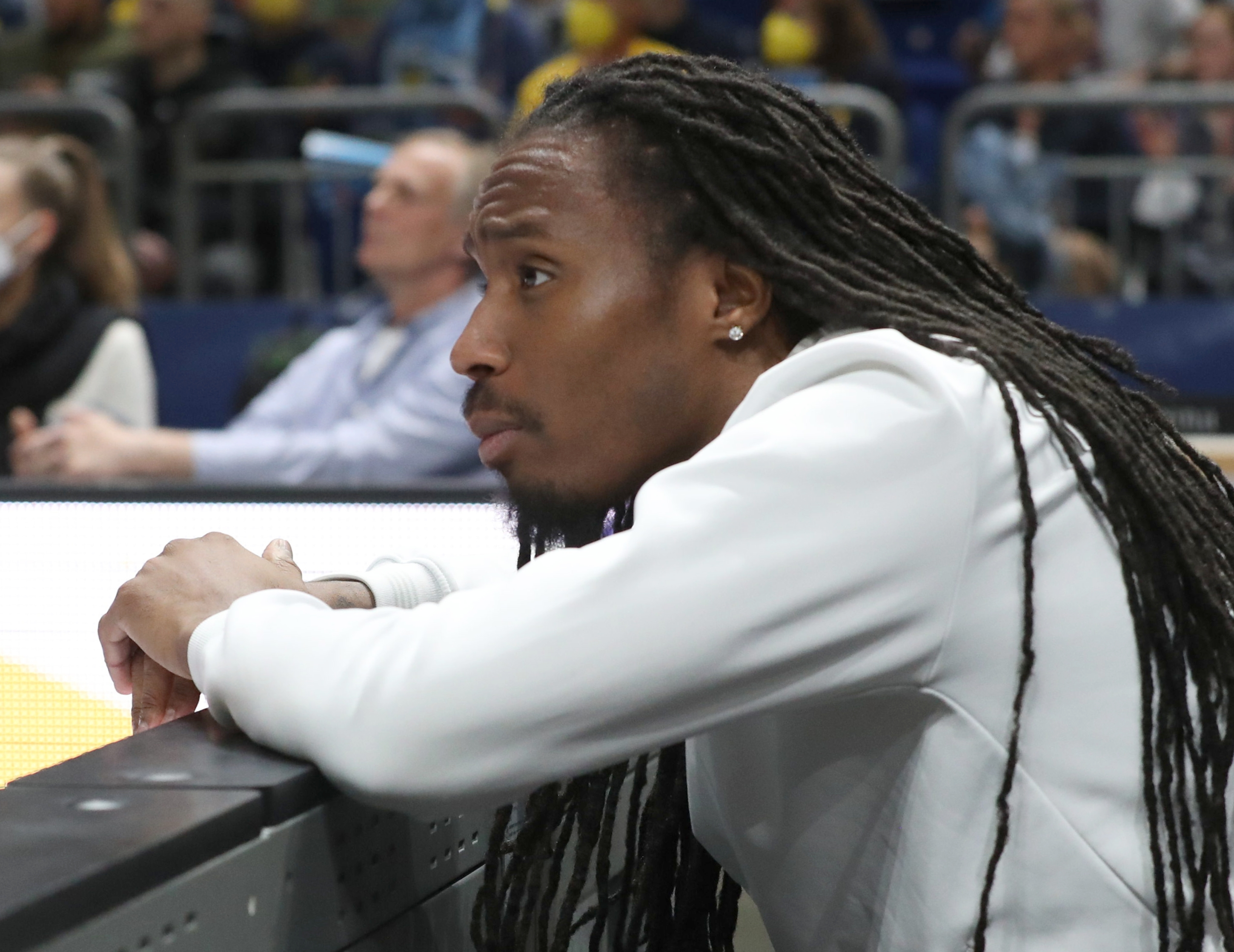

Al-Najma
- Position: Point guard
- League: Bahraini Premier League

Personal information
- Born: December 23, 1987 (age 38) Forestville, Maryland, U.S.
- Listed height: 6 ft 2 in (1.88 m)
- Listed weight: 173 lb (78 kg)

Career information
- High school: McDonough (Pomfret, Maryland)
- College: Cecil (2006–2007); Dayton (2008–2010)
- NBA draft: 2010: undrafted
- Playing career: 2010–present

Career history
- 2010–2011: Saar-Pfalz Braves
- 2011–2012: Levharti Chomutov
- 2012–2013: Best Balıkesir
- 2013–2014: Lighthouse Trapani
- 2014: Koroivos
- 2014–2015: VEF Rīga
- 2015–2016: Nea Kifissia
- 2016: Alba Berlin
- 2016–2017: Astana
- 2017–2018: Antalya BSB
- 2018–2019: Twarde Pierniki Toruń
- 2019: Promitheas Patras
- 2019–2020: Tsmoki-Minsk
- 2020–2021: s.Oliver Würzburg
- 2021–2022: MLP Academics Heidelberg
- 2022–2024: Qadsia
- 2025–present: Al-Najma

Career highlights
- Kazakhstan League champion (2017); Kazakhstan Cup winner (2017); German Cup winner (2016); Latvian League champion (2015); Belarusian Cup MVP (2020)

Robert Lowery Jr. (born December 23, 1987) is an American professional basketball player for Al-Najma of the Bahraini Premier League. Standing at 1.88 m (6 ft 2 in), he plays the point guard position. After two years at Cecil College and two years at Dayton, Lowery entered the 2010 NBA draft but was not selected in the draft's two rounds.

== High school career ==
Lowery played high school basketball at McDonough High School, in Pomfret, Maryland.

== College career ==
Lowery spent his college career at Cecil College and at the University of Dayton. At Cecil, he earned First Team Division II Junior College All-American honors, and was selected to compete in the 2008 national junior college all-star game in Phoenix, Arizona. In his senior season, he helped the Dayton Flyers capture the NIT championship.

== Professional career ==
Lowery started his professional career in the German Second Division with the Saar-Pfalz Braves in the 2010–11 season.

Lowery signed with Levharti Chomutov of the Czech Republic for the 2011–12 season and was chosen to play at the Czech NBL Allstar Game in 2012. He averaged 17.6 points a game for Chomutov on the season.

He then continued his pro career in Turkey, turning out for Turkish Second Division team Best Balikesir Basketbol Kulubu in 2012–13. He earned the Eurobasket.com website's All-Turkish TB2L Honorable Mention status that season.

Lowery headed to Italy for the 2013–14 campaign, joining the Italian Second Division club Lighthouse Trapani, before landing a deal in one of the major leagues in Europe, the A1 in Greece. He signed with ASA Koroivos Amaliadas for the 2014–15 campaign. In eight games, he averaged 16.8 points, as well as 5 rebounds, 2.4 assists, and 2.4 steals, before moving to Latvian powerhouse VEF Rīga. on December 7, 2014.

In July 2015, he signed with Denizli Basket of Turkey. But due to health problems, Denizli and Lowery parted ways in September 2015. After starting the 2015–16 season with Nea Kifissia in Greece, Lowery moved to Germany's first division club Alba Berlin on January 19, 2016.

Lowery spent the 2018–19 season with Twarde Pierniki Toruń in Poland, averaging 12.8 points, 3.7 rebounds and 6.4 assists per game. On July 11, 2019, Lowery returned to Greece and signed a deal with Promitheas Patras of the Greek Basket League. Lowery signed with Tsmoki-Minsk on October 24. He averaged 12.9 points, three rebounds and 5.4 assists per game in the VTB League. On July 21, 2020, Lowery re-signed with the team.

On April 2, 2021, he has signed with s.Oliver Würzburg of the Basketball Bundesliga.

On August 20, 2021, he has signed with MLP Academics Heidelberg of the Basketball Bundesliga.

In January 2025, Lowery joined the Al-Najma of the Bahraini Premier League.
