= Jānis Timma =

Latvian basketball player (1992–2024)

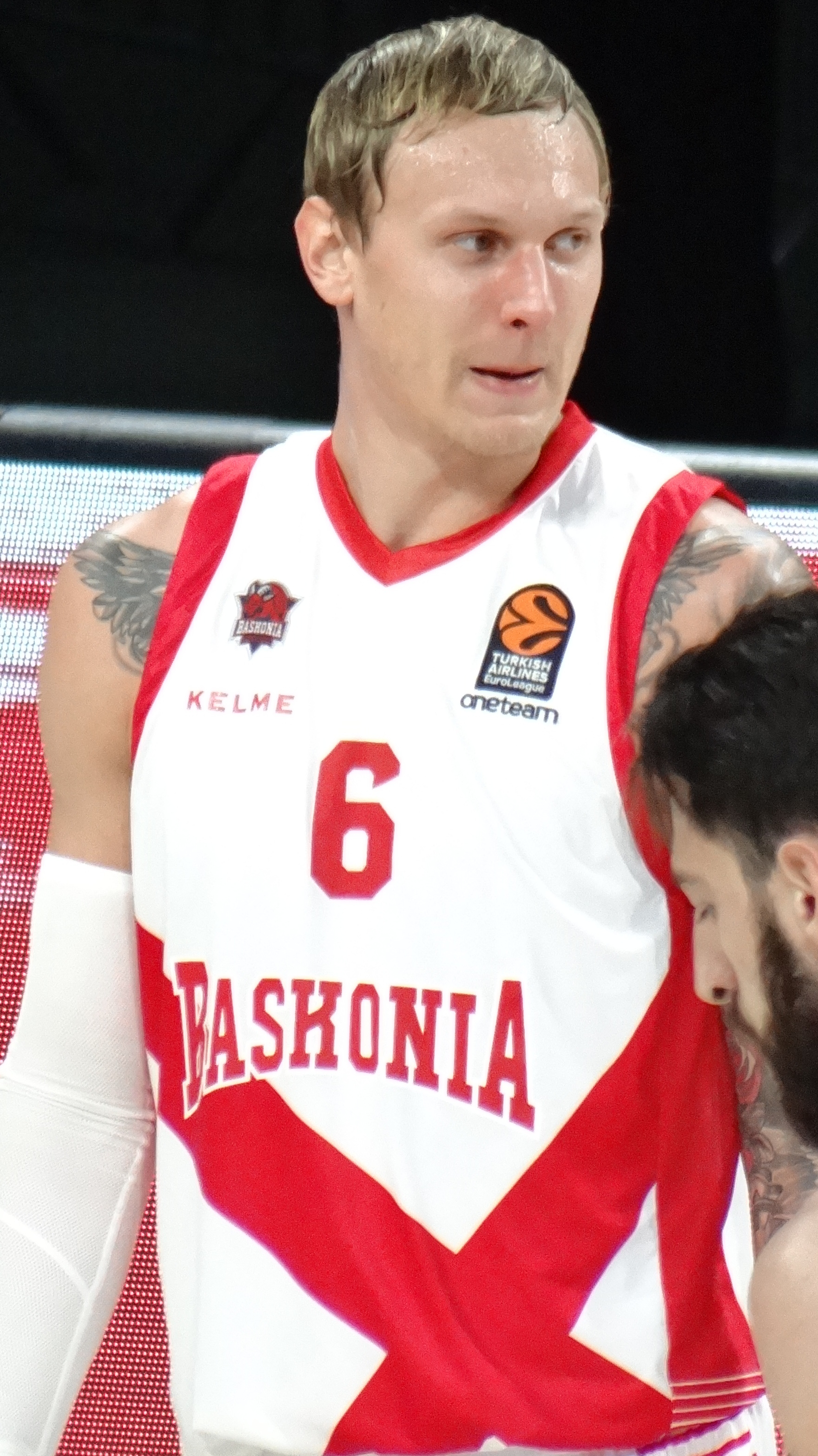
- Timma with Baskonia in 2017

Personal information
- Born: 2 July 1992 Krāslava, Latvia
- Died: 17 December 2024 (aged 32) Moscow, Russia
- Listed height: 6 ft 7 in (2.01 m)
- Listed weight: 227 lb (103 kg)

Career information
- NBA draft: 2013: 2nd round, 60th overall pick
- Drafted by: Memphis Grizzlies
- Playing career: 2008–2024
- Position: Small forward
- Number: 3, 6, 10, 16, 31, 62

Career history
- 2008–2009: ASK Riga
- 2009–2011: DSN Riga
- 2011–2012: Liepājas Lauvas
- 2012–2014: Ventspils
- 2014–2015: VEF Rīga
- 2015–2017: Zenit Saint Petersburg
- 2017–2018: Baskonia
- 2018–2019: Olympiacos
- 2019: →Khimki Moscow
- 2019–2021: Khimki Moscow
- 2021: UNICS Kazan
- 2022: Lakeland Magic
- 2022–2023: Grises de Humacao
- 2023: Darüşşafaka
- 2024: Monbus Obradoiro
- 2024: Alikson Team (3x3)

Career highlights
- VTB United League Young Player of the Year (2015); 2× VTB United League Top Latvian Player (2015, 2016); All-VTB United League First Team (2016); 2× All-VTB United League Second Team (2017, 2019); VTB United League Dunk Contest champion (2017); VTB United League All-Star (2017); Baltic League champion (2013); Baltic League Finals MVP (2013); 2× Latvian League champion (2014, 2015); Latvian League Playoffs MVP (2014); 4× Latvian All-Star (2012–2015); Latvian All-Star Game MVP (2015); Latvian Dunk Contest champion (2014); Latvian-Estonian League Best Defender (2015); 2× Latvian-Estonian League Domestic Player of the Year (2014, 2015); 2× All-Latvian-Estonian League First Team (2014, 2015); All-Latvian Estonian League Second Team (2013)
- Stats at Basketball Reference
Medals
Men's basketball
Representing Latvia
European U-18 Championship
Bronze medal – third place	2010 Lithuania	Under-18

Jānis Timma (2 July 1992 – 17 December 2024) was a Latvian professional basketball player. Standing at 2.01 m (6 ft 7 in), he mainly played at the small forward position. He also represented the senior Latvia national team.

A native of Krāslava, Timma started his career in 2008 with ASK Riga and had stints with several EuroLeague teams, including Khimki Moscow, Baskonia and Olympiacos. In his youth, he was regarded as one of the top prospects of his generation in Europe.

== Professional career ==
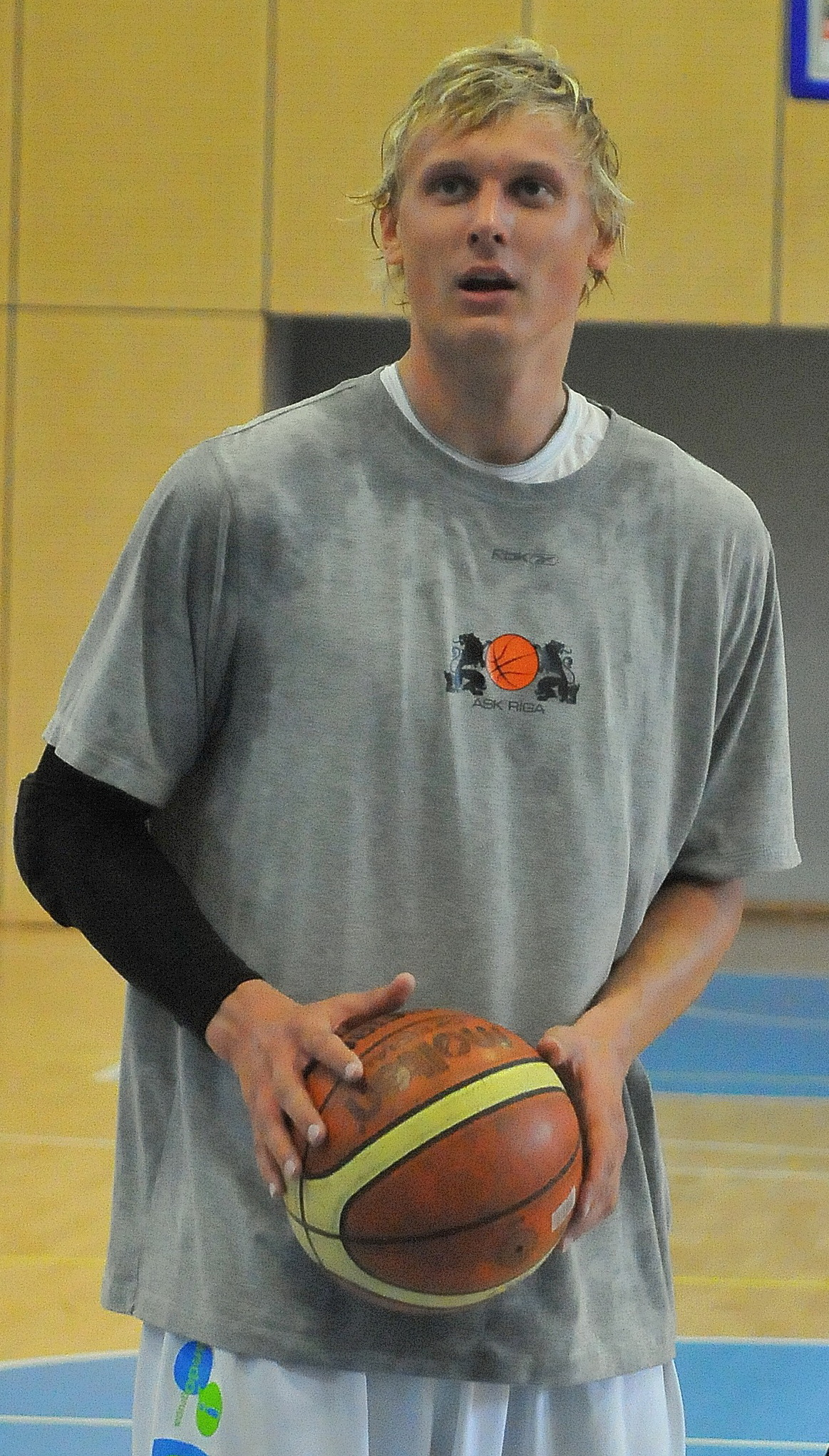
Timma, as a member of ASK's Under-19 club, in 2011

Timma grew up playing basketball in his hometown of Krāslava, but at age 15 moved to Rīga. At first he joined ASK Rīga's youth system, and made a few appearances for its senior team, during the end of the 2008–09 season. The following year, ASK Riga was dissolved and he played with DSN Rīga, a team that consisted of young Latvian talents. Timma helped DSN Rīga to win the Latvian 2nd division in the 2009–10 season. He also spent the majority of the next season playing with DSN Rīga.

Timma joined Liepājas Lauvas for the 2011–12 season. That can be considered his first real season at the pro level. After a decent season in Liepāja, Timma made the next step in his career. On 1 August 2012, he signed a multi-year contract with Ventspils.

In April 2013, he led Ventspils to the Baltic Basketball League championship, and he won the Finals MVP award.

In his second season with Ventspils, Timma won his first Latvian League championship, and he was named the MVP of the playoffs.

On 28 July 2014, he signed with the Latvian club VEF Rīga, where he played for the first time in such quality competition as the European-wide secondary league, the EuroCup, and the VTB United League.

Timma was named the MVP of the 2015 Latvian Basketball League All-Star Game, after he scored 41 points, and set a new scoring record. On 5 May 2015, he was named the VTB United League Young Player of the Year. He finished the season with VEF Rīga, by winning the Latvian League (LBL) championship. In total, he played in 58 games with VEF Riga, averaging 12.6 points per game, in all the competitions that his team participated in.

On 30 June 2015, he signed a two-year contract with the Russian team Zenit St. Petersburg.

On 8 June 2017, Timma signed a three-year deal with the Spanish club Baskonia.

On 18 July 2018, Timma parted ways with Baskonia and signed a two-year deal with the Greek club Olympiacos of the EuroLeague.

His stint in Greece proved unsuccessful and he was loaned to fellow EuroLeague club Khimki Moscow on 12 March 2019 for the remainder of the 2018–19 season. On 27 June 2019 Timma signed on to continue playing for the Russian team with a two-year contract.

On 15 November 2021 Timma signed a temporary deal with UNICS Kazan of the VTB United League. On December 6, he was waived by the Russian club.

On 31 January 2022 Timma signed with the Lakeland Magic, as they held his draft rights.

On 23 December 2022, Timma signed with Grises de Humacao of the Puerto Rican Baloncesto Superior Nacional (BSN) until the end of the season.

On 22 September 2023, Timma signed with Darüşşafaka of the Basketbol Süper Ligi (BSL).

On 18 February 2024, Timma signed with Monbus Obradoiro of the Liga ACB.

=== NBA draft rights ===
In 2013, Timma declared for the 2013 NBA draft. He was selected with the last pick (60th overall) by the Memphis Grizzlies.

On 24 June 2015, the Memphis Grizzlies traded Timma's draft rights to the Orlando Magic in exchange for Luke Ridnour.

In 2021, Timma was a part of the Magic's Summer League team in Las Vegas, scoring 11 points in his debut on August 10. As a 29-year-old rookie, his distinct blonde tattooed look drew attention online and led to jokes from fans.

== National team career ==
With Latvia's junior national team, Timma won a bronze medal at the 2010 FIBA Europe Under-18 Championship. In 2013, he first appeared with the senior Latvian national team. With Latvia's senior team, he has played at the 2015 EuroBasket, the 2016 Belgrade FIBA Olympic Qualifying Tournament, the 2017 EuroBasket, and the 2024 Summer Olympics – Men's qualification.

In 2024, he joined the Russian basketball club "Alikson Team" to participate in a 3x3 basketball tournament organised by bookmaker Liga Stavok.

== Personal life and death ==
Timma married his long-term girlfriend Sana Strādniece in 2016. Their son was born in 2018. The couple divorced in late 2019.

Timma married Russian-Ukrainian pop singer Anna Sedokova in 2020. On 16 October 2024, Sedokova filed for a divorce and they were legally divorced on 9 December. On 16 December he wrote an Instagram post with her birthday as his death date (16 December), but the post was later deleted.

Timma died on 17 December 2024, at the age of 32. His body was found at the entrance of a high-rise building in the centre of Moscow. Police stated that they presumed Timma's death to be suicide and that no criminal leads were being pursued. His remains were transported to Latvia where a funeral took place on 27 December in Riga.

== Career statistics ==
Legend
GP	Games played	GS	Games started	MPG	Minutes per game
FG%	Field-goal percentage	3P%	3-point field-goal percentage	FT%	Free-throw percentage
RPG	Rebounds per game	APG	Assists per game	SPG	Steals per game
BPG	Blocks per game	PPG	Points per game	PIR	Performance index rating
**Bold**	Career high

=== EuroLeague ===
Year	Team	GP	GS	MPG	FG%	3P%	FT%	RPG	APG	SPG	BPG	PPG	PIR
2017–18	Baskonia	**33**	**27**	22.8	.483	**.412**	**.767**	2.3	1.2	.9	.1	7.6	7.1
2018–19	Olympiacos	23	9	11.3	.474	.404	.500	.9	.7	.3	.1	3.4	2.1
2019–20	Khimki	21	20	**29.5**	**.540**	.375	.682	**3.1**	**2.0**	**1.2**	**.3**	**15.5**	**11.2**
2020–21	Khimki	16	10	24.8	.364	.350	.727	2.8	.9	1.0	.2	7.1	5.6
2021–22	UNICS	3	2	9.5	.167	.167	.000	.7	1.0	.7	.0	1.0	.3
Career		96	68	21.5	.428	.382	.704	2.2	1.2	.8	.1	7.4	5.9

=== NBA G League ===
Year	Team	GP	GS	MPG	FG%	3P%	FT%	RPG	APG	SPG	BPG	PPG
2021–22	Lakeland	20	3	20.2	.354	.304	.750	3.4	1.3	.3	.3	6.4

== See also ==
- List of basketball players who died during their careers
