= Ike Ofoegbu =

American-Nigerian basketball player

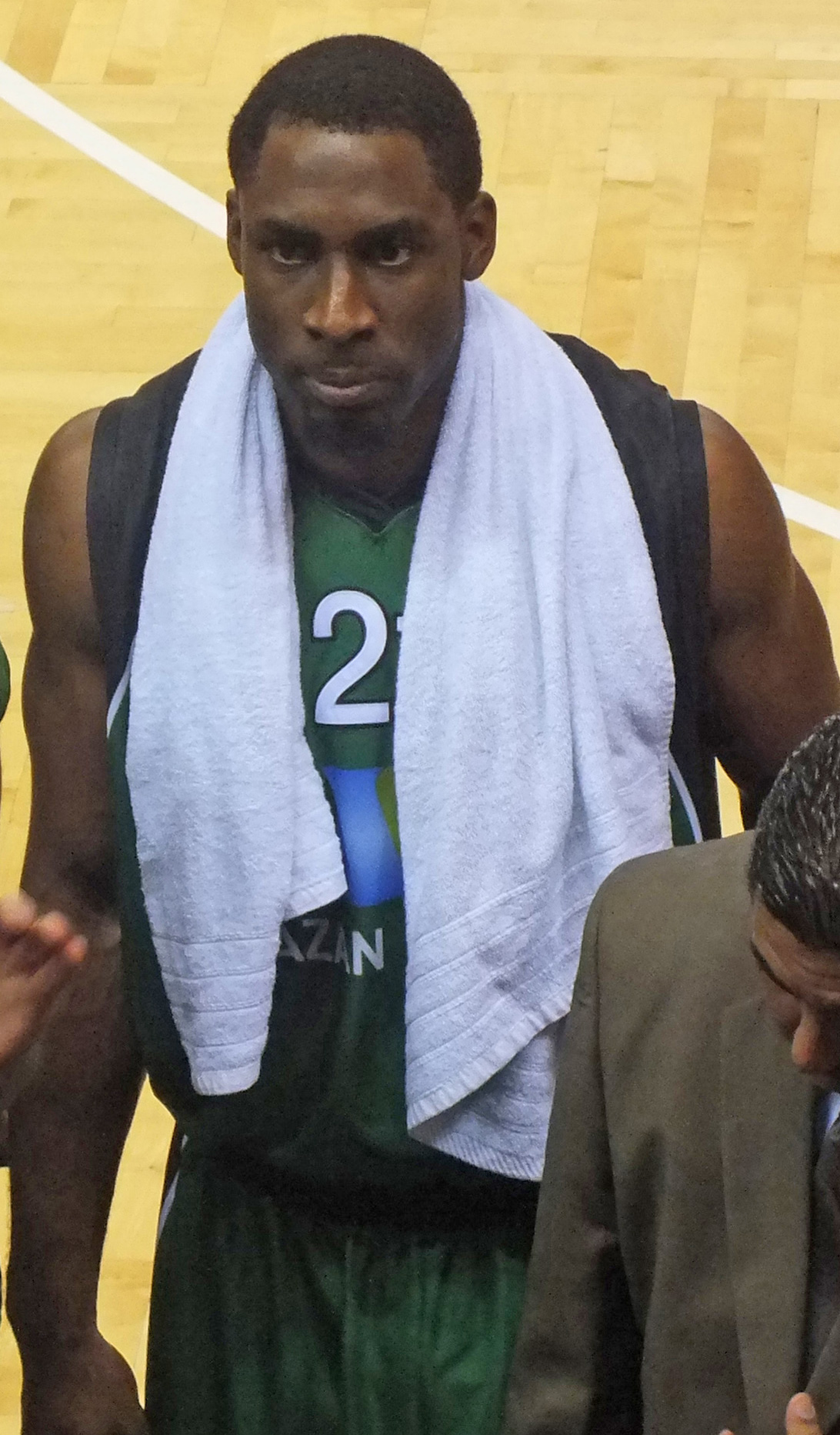
- Ofoegbu with Maccabi Haifa in 2013

Personal information
- Born: November 9, 1984 (age 42) San Antonio, Texas
- Listed height: 6 ft 8.75 in (2.05 m)
- Listed weight: 224 lb (102 kg)

Career information
- High school: Taft (San Antonio, Texas)
- College: SMU (2004–2007)
- NBA draft: 2007: undrafted
- Playing career: 2007–2020
- Position: Power forward / center

Career history
- 2007–2009: Optima Gent
- 2010: Indios de Mayagüez
- 2010–2011: Toros de Nuevo Laredo
- 2011: Caciques de Humacao
- 2011–2012: Pioneros de Quintana Roo
- 2012–2013: Toros de Nuevo Laredo
- 2013: Bucaneros de La Guaira
- 2013–2015: Maccabi Haifa
- 2015: Capitanes de Arecibo
- 2015–2016: Maccabi Tel Aviv
- 2016–2017: Best Balıkesir
- 2017–2018: Uşak Sportif
- 2018: Capitanes de Arecibo
- 2019: Aguacateros de Michoacán
- 2019–2020: Maccabi Ashdod

Career highlights
- 2× Mexican LNPB champion (2011, 2013); 2× Mexican LNPB MVP (2011, 2013); NBA D-League All-Star (2013); All-Israeli League First Team (2015); Israeli League Cup Winner (2016)

Ikechukwu Justin (Yitzhak) "Ike" Ofoegbu (born November 9, 1984) is an American-Nigerian former professional basketball player. He is a 2.05 m (6 ft 8.75) tall power forward-center. He played college basketball with SMU.

== Professional career ==
On March 8, 2013, Ofoegbu signed with Bucaneros de La Guaira of Venezuela for the 2013 BSN season.

On July 27, 2013, Ofoegbu signed with Israeli club Maccabi Haifa for the 2013–14 season. On July 19, 2014, he re-signed with Maccabi for one more season. On June 11, 2015, he signed with Capitanes de Arecibo of Puerto Rico for the rest of the 2015 BSN season.

On October 20, 2015, Ofoegbu signed with Israeli club Maccabi Tel Aviv to replace injured Brian Randle. On December 24, 2015, he re-signed with Maccabi till the end of February, and later re-signed for the rest of the season.

On August 29, 2016, Ofoegbu signed with Turkish club Best Balıkesir for the 2016–17 season.

On October 13, 2017, Ofoegbu signed with Uşak Sportif.

On April 29, Ofoegbu returned to Capitanes de Arecibo.

On December 19, 2019, Ofoegbu returned to Israel for a third stint, signing with Maccabi Ashdod for the rest of the season.

== National team ==
In 2011 and 2012, Ofoegbu was a member of the senior Nigerian national basketball team.
