= Saar-Pfalz Braves =

- Founded: 1950
- Dissolved: 2012
- History: Saar-Pfalz Braves (1950–2012)
- Arena: Sportzentrum Homburg-Erbach
- Capacity: 3,900
- Location: Saar-Pfalz, Germany

Saar-Pfalz Braves was a German professional basketball club based in Saar-Pfalz. Due to financial problems, the club was dissolved in June 2012.

== Notable players ==
Note: Flags indicate national team eligibility at FIBA-sanctioned events. Players may hold other non-FIBA nationalities not displayed.

Criteria

To appear in this section a player must have either:

- Set a club record or won an individual award while at the club
- Played at least one official international match for their national team at any time
- Played at least one official NBA match at any time.

- (Germany) Maik Zirbes
- (United States) Travis Reed
