= Justin Reynolds =

American professional basketball player (born 1988)

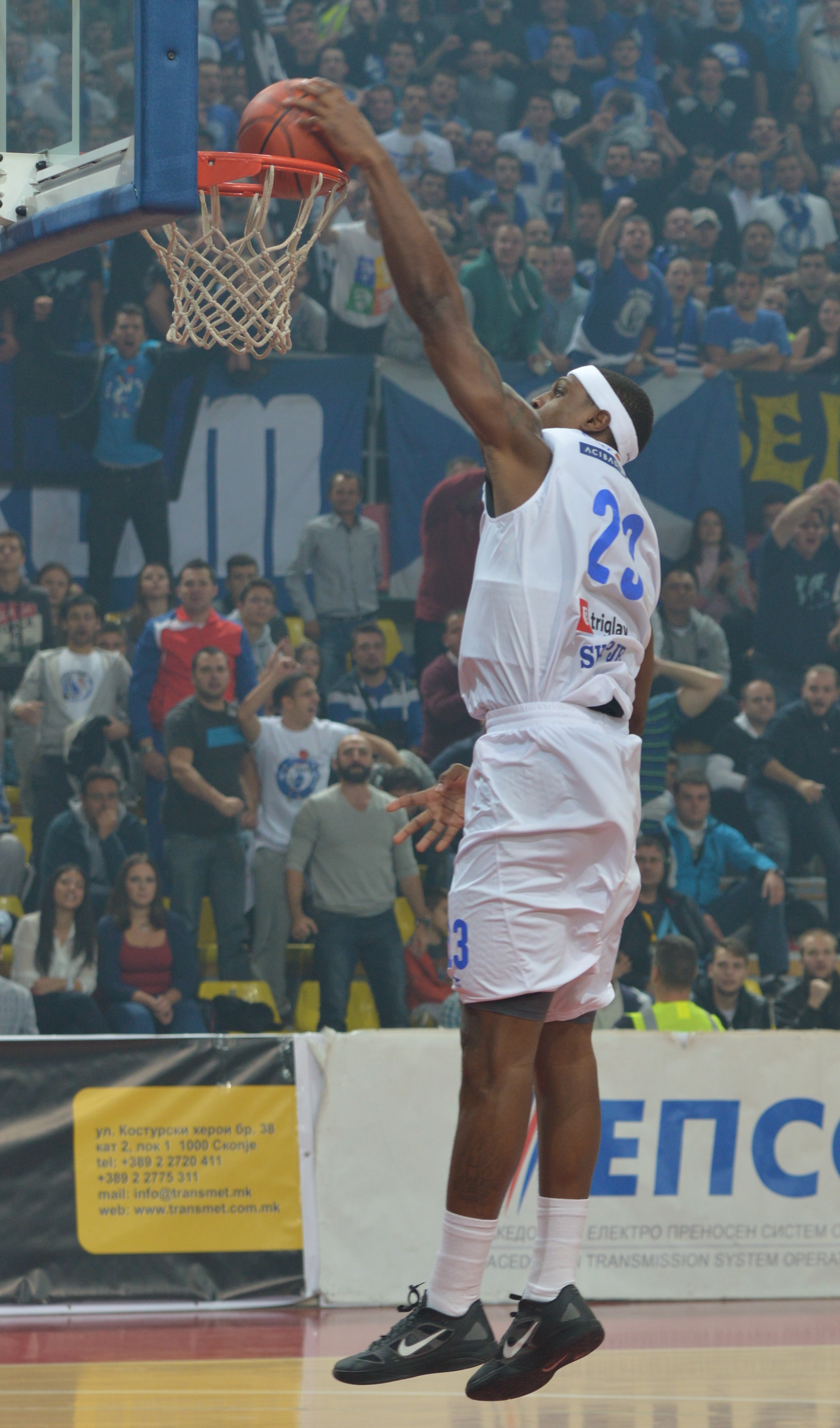
- Reynolds with KK MZT Skopje in October 2013

Personal information
- Born: December 12, 1988 (age 37)
- Listed height: 6 ft 9 in (2.06 m)
- Listed weight: 235 lb (107 kg)

Career information
- High school: Pearland (Pearland, Texas)
- College: Texas A&M–Corpus Christi (2007–2011)
- NBA draft: 2011: undrafted
- Playing career: 2011–2018
- Position: Power forward / center

Career history
- 2011–2012: Torus
- 2012–2013: JA Vichy
- 2013: MZT Skopje
- 2014–2015: Tsukuba Robots
- 2015–2016: Texas Legends
- 2017: U.D. Oliveirense
- 2017: Passlab Yamagata Wyverns
- 2017: Levanga Hokkaido
- 2018: South West Slammers

Justin Darcey Reynolds (born December 12, 1988) is an American former professional basketball player who last played for the South West Slammers of the State Basketball League (SBL). He played college basketball for Texas A&M–Corpus Christi.

== College career ==
Reynolds played four years of college basketball for Texas A&M–Corpus Christi between 2007 and 2011, where he finished Top 10 all-time in scoring, rebounds, blocks and steals. In 124 games, he made 114 starts and averaged 10.0 points, 6.3 rebounds, 1.0 assists and 1.0 steals in 25.3 minutes per game.

== Professional career ==
Reynolds spent his first two professional seasons in Macedonia and France, with KK Torus and JA Vichy respectively. He returned to Macedonia for the 2013–14 season, joining KK MZT Skopje. However, his contract was terminated in December 2013. In March 2014, he joined Japanese team Tsukuba Robots. He continued on with Tsukuba Robots for the 2014–15 season.

On October 31, 2015, Reynolds was selected by the Texas Legends in the fourth round of the 2015 NBA Development League Draft. On February 8, 2016, he was waived by the Legends. In 14 games, he averaged 4.1 points and 2.9 rebounds per game.

In January 2017, Reynolds joined Portuguese team U.D. Oliveirense. He returned to Japan for the 2017–18 season, initially joining Passlab Yamagata Wyverns before moving to Levanga Hokkaido, where he played five games in December 2017.

In February 2018, Reynolds signed with the South West Slammers of the State Basketball League. On April 12, 2018, he parted ways with the Slammers.
