= Cade Davis =

American basketball player (born 1988)

Personal information
- Born: June 28, 1988 (age 38) Amarillo, Texas
- Listed height: 6 ft 5.75 in (1.97 m)
- Listed weight: 206 lb (93 kg)

Career information
- High school: Elk City (Elk City, Oklahoma)
- College: Oklahoma (2007–2011)
- NBA draft: 2011: undrafted
- Playing career: 2011–2020
- Position: Shooting guard / small forward
- Number: 34

Career history
- 2011–2014: MZT Skopje
- 2014–2015: Nea Kifisia
- 2015–2016: Kauhajoen Karhu
- 2016–2017: Pallacanestro Chieti
- 2017–2018: Keravnos
- 2018–2019: Okapi Aalstar
- 2019–2020: Kuala Lumpur Dragons

Career highlights
- 3× Macedonian League champion (2012–2014); 3× Macedonian Cup champion (2012–2014); Cypriot League All-Star (2017)

Cade Davis (born June 28, 1988) is an American former professional basketball player.

== College career ==
Davis played college basketball at the University of Oklahoma, with the Oklahoma Sooners, where he was one of the team's leading scorers and rebounders. At Oklahoma, he was a teammate of Blake Griffin.

=== College ===
Year	Team	GP	GS	MPG	FG%	3P%	FT%	RPG	APG	SPG	BPG	PPG
2007–08	Oklahoma	28	6	13.3	.320	.275	.1000	1.5	0.4	0.3	0.1	3.7
2008–09	Oklahoma	35	1	14.6	.383	.345	.656	1.7	0.9	0.4	0.1	4.7
2009–10	Oklahoma	31	27	31.8	.392	.347	.778	3.9	1.0	1.5	0.3	9.9
2010–11	Oklahoma	31	31	34.9	.447	.358	.728	5.0	1.8	1.0	0.5	14.2
Career		125	65	23.6	.404	.341	.759	3.0	1.0	0.8	0.2	8.1

== Professional career ==
In July 2011, Davis signed to play with MZT Skopje. As one of the team's leaders and starters, he helped the team to win the Macedonian League championship in 2012, 2013, and 2014.

In August 2014, he signed with the Greek League team AENK for the 2014–15 season.

On September 11, 2015, Davis signed with Kauhajoen Karhu for the 2015–16 season.

On July 26, 2016, Davis signed with Pallacanestro Chieti of the Serie A2 Basket.

On August 5, 2017, Davis signed with Keravnos of the Cypriot League.

=== Eurocup ===
Year	Team	GP	GS	MPG	FG%	3P%	FT%	RPG	APG	SPG	BPG	PPG	PIR
2013–14	MZT Skopje	8	3	25.9	.440	.419	.714	2.9	1.8	1.0	0.3	7.8	6.1
Career		8	3	25.9	.440	.419	.714	2.9	1.8	1.0	0.3	7.8	6.1
