= 2016–17 VTB United League =

VTB United League
- Season: 2016–17
- Duration: 2 October 2016 – 23 April 2017 (Regular season); 1 May – 13 June 2017 (Playoffs)
- Teams: 13

Regular season
- Season MVP: (Russia) Alexey Shved

Finals
- Champions: (Russia) CSKA Moscow (8th title)
- Runners-up: (Russia) Khimki
- Playoffs MVP: (France) Nando de Colo

Statistical leaders
Points	(United States) Nick Minnerath	23.3
Rebounds	(United States Virgin Islands) Frank Elegar	9.0
Assists	(Spain) Quino Colom	8.4
Index Rating	(United States) Nick Minnerath	20.6

Records
- Highest attendance: 7,316; Parma 55–116 CSKA Moscow (13 April 2017)
- Lowest attendance: 250; Astana 76–92 CSKA Moscow (8 October 2016)

The 2016–17 VTB United League was the eighth complete season of the VTB United League. It is also the fourth season that the league functions as the Russian domestic first tier level. CSKA Moscow was the defending champion and successfully defended its title. This season, 13 teams participated in the league after four sides from the previous year left.

== Teams ==
VITA Tbilisi, Bisons Loimaa, ČEZ Nymburk left the league, after participating in the 2015–16 season. Parma Perm from the Russian Basketball Super League joined the league.

On August 30, 2016, the league announced that BC Krasny Oktyabr would not play in the league, because the host arena of the team was not approved to support events.

Because of these changes, the number of teams was reduced to 13.

=== Venues and locations ===
Locations of teams in the 2016–17 VTB United League

Team	Home City	Arena	Capacity
(Kazakhstan) Astana	Astana	Saryarka Velodrome	10,000
(Russia) Avtodor Saratov	Saratov	Kristall Ice Sports Palace	6,100
(Russia) CSKA Moscow ●	Moscow	Universal Sports Hall CSKA	5,500
(Russia) Enisey	Krasnoyarsk	Arena Sever	4,100
(Estonia) Kalev/Cramo	Tallinn	Saku Suurhall Arena	7,000
(Russia) Khimki	Khimki	Basketball Center	4,000
(Russia) Lokomotiv Kuban	Krasnodar	Basket-Hall	7,500
(Russia) Nizhny Novgorod	Nizhny Novgorod	Trade Union Sport Palace	5,600
(Russia) Parma ◆	Perm	Universal Sports Palace Molot	7,000
(Belarus) Tsmoki Minsk	Minsk	Minsk Arena	15,000
(Russia) UNICS	Kazan	Basket Hall Arena	7,500
(Latvia) VEF Rīga	Rīga	Arēna Rīga	12,500
(Russia) Zenit Saint Petersburg	Saint Petersburg	Yubileyni Arena	7,044

Notes

◆ Team makes its debut in the VTB United League.
● The defending champions, winners of the 2015–16 VTB United League.

== Regular season ==
=== Standings ===
Pos	Team	Pld	W	L	PF	PA	PD	PCT	Qualification
1	(Russia) CSKA Moscow	24	22	2	2274	1782	+492	.917	Advance to Playoffs
2	(Russia) Zenit Saint Petersburg	24	21	3	2187	1930	+257	.875	Advance to Playoffs
3	(Russia) Khimki	24	19	5	2108	1895	+213	.792	Advance to Playoffs
4	(Russia) Lokomotiv Kuban	24	19	5	1959	1688	+271	.792	Advance to Playoffs
5	(Russia) UNICS	24	15	9	2136	2021	+115	.625	Advance to Playoffs
6	(Russia) Enisey	24	13	11	1974	2041	−67	.542	Advance to Playoffs
7	(Latvia) VEF Rīga	24	11	13	1857	1961	−104	.458	Advance to Playoffs
8	(Kazakhstan) Astana	24	9	15	1806	1930	−124	.375	Advance to Playoffs
9	(Russia) Nizhny Novgorod	24	8	16	2051	2173	−122	.333	
10	(Russia) Avtodor Saratov	24	8	16	2073	2184	−111	.333	
11	(Estonia) Kalev/Cramo	24	5	19	1876	2109	−233	.208	
12	(Belarus) Tsmoki Minsk	24	5	19	1757	1987	−230	.208	
13	(Russia) Parma	24	1	23	1840	2197	−357	.042	

Source: VTB United League

=== Results ===
Home \ Away	AST	AVT	CSK	ENI	KAL	KHI	LOK	NIZ	PAR	TSM	UNI	VEF	ZEN
Astana		83–78	76–92	98–97	72–78	87–90	51–71	93–84	88–73	84–67	68–84	66–64	82–105
Avtodor Saratov	78–79		103–104	94–87	90–63	109–118	79–88	95–92	110–99	88–81	77–84	96–84	90–96
CSKA Moscow	81–63	95–80		85–63	100–68	95–79	83–77	105–78	98–74	109–74	92–88	82–51	105–56
Enisey	88–78	97–92	84–97		99–90	64–104	85–86	99–93	87–82	88–70	75–66	88–71	75–100
Kalev/Cramo	84–67	86–94	68–87	82–91		77–84	64–95	87–91	85–79	79–70	86–110	74–82	95–98
Khimki	83–66	102–70	70–92	72–64	81–57		73–65	90–84	92–66	80–72	87–70	73–76	66–74
Lokomotiv Kuban	67–59	79–61	83–74	66–68	86–75	84–89		88–75	86–61	81–72	75–64	107–64	80–83
Nizhny Novgorod	76–72	110–68	65–101	80–93	102–81	90–99	66–93		115–94	102–95	98–112	74–81	93–97
Parma	65–82	97–101	55–116	79–81	72–86	83–87	71–84	75–84		61–67	98–105	74–81	86–119
Tsmoki-Minsk	70–80	89–83	63–100	78–86	88–81	73–77	63–87	77–52	62–71		87–85	69–72	58–71
UNICS	83–78	95–83	91–105	100–56	104–91	73–98	77–83	104–81	89–73	98–71		89–84	84–109
VEF Rīga	73–62	87–76	83–99	84–81	78–66	90–104	69–80	73–78	91–80	88–85	82–86		73–82
Zenit Saint Petersburg	99–72	89–78	90–77	94–78	89–73	114–110	62–68	101–88	101–72	84–56	84–95	90–76	

Source: VTB United League
Legend: Blue = home team win; Red = away team win.

== Playoffs ==
All series were played in a best-of-five play-off series, which were played in a 2-2-1 format. The Playoffs started on May 1 and ended on June 13.

Quarterfinals; 1–12 May
1	(Russia) CSKA Moscow	3
8	(Kazakhstan) Astana	0
4	(Russia) Lokomotiv Kuban	3
5	(Russia) UNICS	1
2	(Russia) Zenit Saint Petersburg	3
7	(Latvia) VEF Rīga	0
3	(Russia) Khimki	3
6	(Russia) Enisey	0

Semifinals; 25 May–4 June
1	(Russia) CSKA Moscow	3
4	(Russia) Lokomotiv Kuban	0
2	(Russia) Zenit Saint Petersburg	2
3	(Russia) Khimki	3

Finals; 8–13 June
1	(Russia) CSKA Moscow	3
3	(Russia) Khimki	0

=== Quarterfinals ===
Team 1	Series	Team 2	Game 1	Game 2	Game 3	Game 4	Game 5
CSKA Moscow (Russia)	3–0	(Kazakhstan) Astana	77–54	94–74	91–73		
Lokomotiv Kuban (Russia)	3–1	(Russia) UNICS	62–71	92–76	83–71	84–79	
Zenit Saint Petersburg (Russia)	3–0	(Latvia) VEF Rīga	93–81	79–74	92–51		
Khimki (Russia)	3–0	(Russia) Enisey	91–84	109–81	89–68		

=== Semifinals ===
Team 1	Series	Team 2	Game 1	Game 2	Game 3	Game 4	Game 5
CSKA Moscow (Russia)	3–0	(Russia) Lokomotiv Kuban	101–95	84–71	74–66		
Zenit Saint Petersburg (Russia)	2–3	(Russia) Khimki	99–95	92–89	73–97	71–73	84–90

=== Finals ===
Team 1	Series	Team 2	Game 1	Game 2	Game 3	Game 4	Game 5
CSKA Moscow (Russia)	3–0	(Russia) Khimki	94–88	99–79	95–72		

== Final standings ==
Pos	Team	Pld	W	L	PF	PA	PD	Qualification or relegation
1	CSKA Moscow (Note: CSKA Moscow was already qualified for the 2018–19 EuroLeague, as the team holds a 10-year license contract with the league.) (C)	33	31	2	3083	2454	+629	Qualification to EuroLeague
2	Khimki	35	25	10	3080	2835	+245	Qualification to EuroLeague
3	Zenit Saint Petersburg	31	26	5	2870	2580	+290	Qualification to EuroCup
4	Lokomotiv Kuban	31	22	9	2512	2244	+268	Qualification to EuroCup
5	UNICS	28	16	12	2433	2342	+91	Qualification to EuroCup
6	Enisey	27	13	14	2207	2330	−123	Qualification to Champions League
7	VEF Rīga	27	11	16	2063	2225	−162	
8	Astana	27	9	18	2007	2192	−185	
9	Nizhny Novgorod	24	8	16	2051	2173	−122	Qualification to Champions League
10	Avtodor Saratov	24	8	16	2073	2184	−111	Qualification to Champions League
11	Kalev/Cramo	24	5	19	1876	2109	−233	
12	Tsmoki-Minsk	24	5	19	1757	1987	−230	
13	Parma	24	1	23	1840	2197	−357	Qualification to Europe Cup qualifying rounds

Source: VTB United League
(C) Champions

== All-Star Game ==
The VTB League's inaugural All-Star Game was held this season on February 11, 2017. The game was played at the Bolshoy Ice Dome in Sochi, Russia. The game was played in a Russia Stars vs. the World Stars format. The Russian Stars won the game against the World Stars, by a score of 131:121. Andrey Vorontsevich was named the MVP of the game. Jānis Timma won the All-Star Game's slam dunk contest, and Sergey Karasev won the 3-Point Contest.

(Russia) Russian Stars
Pos	Player	Team	Selections
Starters
G	(Russia) Alexey Shved	Khimki	1
G	(Russia) Sergey Karasev	Zenit Saint Petersburg	1
G	(Russia) Dmitry Khvostov	Lokomotiv Kuban	1
F	(Russia) Victor Khryapa	CSKA Moscow	1
F	(Russia) Andrey Vorontsevich	CSKA Moscow	1
Reserves
G	(Russia) Anton Ponkrashov	UNICS	1
G	(Russia) Sergey Bykov	Avtodor Saratov	1
G	(Russia) Evgeny Voronov	UNICS	1
G	(Russia) Evgeny Kolesnikov	Avtodor Saratov	1
G	(Russia) Ivan Strebkov ^{INJ}	Nizhny Novgorod	1
F	(Russia) Sergei Monia	Khimki	1
F	(Russia) Vladislav Trushkin	Enisey	1
C	(Russia) Andrey Zubkov	Lokomotiv Kuban	1
C	(Russia) Petr Gubanov ^{INJ}	Nizhny Novgorod	1
Head coach: (Russia) Evgeniy Pashutin (UNICS)

World Stars
Pos	Player	Team	Selections
Starters
G	(Serbia) Miloš Teodosić ^{INJ}	CSKA Moscow	1
G	(France) Nando De Colo	CSKA Moscow	1
F	(United States) Keith Langford	UNICS	1
F	(Latvia) Jānis Timma	Zenit Saint Petersburg	1
C	(Belarus) Artsiom Parakhouski	UNICS	1
Reserves
G	(Serbia) Stefan Marković	Zenit Saint Petersburg	1
F	(Latvia) Jānis Blūms	VEF Rīga	1
G	(Serbia) Danilo Andjušić ^{REP}	UNICS	1
G	(Montenegro) Taylor Rochestie	Lokomotiv Kuban	1
F	(Australia) Ryan Broekhoff	Lokomotiv Kuban	1
F	(United States) DeAndre Kane	Nizhny Novgorod	1
F	(United States) Nick Minnerath	Avtodor Saratov	1
C	(United States Virgin Islands) Frank Elegar	Enisey	1
Head coach: (Greece) Dimitrios Itoudis (CSKA Moscow)

- INJ Petr Gubanov, Ivan Strebkov and Miloš Teodosić didn't play because of injury.
- REP Danilo Andjušić was named as Teodosić' replacement.

February 11, 2017	Russian Stars	131–121	World Stars	Sochi
19:20 (MSK)	Scoring by quarter: 45–40, 22–30, 36–28, 28–23
	Pts: Vorontsevich 28; Rebs: Khryapa 10; Asts: three players 7 Eff: Vorontsevich 36	Boxscore	Pts: Blūms, De Colo 18; Rebs: De Colo, Langford 5 Asts: Rochestie 9 Eff: De Colo 24	Arena: Bolshoy Ice Dome; Attendance: 12,000; Referees: Jakub Zamojski (POL), Alexey Davydov (RUS), Semen Ovinov (RUS)

== Awards ==
=== Season Awards ===
Scoring Champion

- (United States) Nick Minnerath – Avtodor Saratov

Young Player of the Year

- (Russia) Ivan Ukhov – Parma

Defensive Player of the Year

- (Russia) Nikita Kurbanov – CSKA Moscow

Sixth Man of the Year

- (Nigeria) Suleiman Braimoh – Enisey

Coach of the Year

- (Greece) Dimitrios Itoudis – CSKA Moscow

Regular Season MVP

- (Russia) Alexey Shved – Khimki

Playoffs MVP

- (Russia) Nando de Colo – CSKA Moscow

=== All-Tournament First Team ===
- (Russia) Alexey Shved – Khimki
- (France) Nando de Colo – CSKA Moscow
- (Russia) Sergey Karasev – Zenit
- (United States) Nick Minnerath – Avtodor
- (United States Virgin Islands) Frank Elegar – Enisey

=== All-Tournament Second Team ===
- (Serbia) Miloš Teodosić – CSKA Moscow
- (United States) Kevin Jones – Lokomotiv Kuban
- (Latvia) Jānis Timma – Zenit Saint Petersburg
- (United States) Mardy Collins – Lokomotiv Kuban
- (Belarus) Artsiom Parakhouski – UNICS

=== MVP of the Month ===
Month	Player	Team	Ref.
2016
October	(United States) Keith Langford	(Russia) UNICS	
November	(Russia) Alexey Shved	(Russia) Khimki	
December	(Russia) Andrey Zubkov	(Russia) Lokomotiv Kuban	
2017
January	(Russia) Sergey Karasev	(Russia) Zenit Saint Petersburg	
February	(Russia) Alexey Shved (2)	(Russia) Khimki	
March	(Serbia) Stefan Marković	(Russia) Zenit Saint Petersburg	
April	(United States) Kevin Jones	(Russia) Lokomotiv Kuban	

== Statistics ==
=== Statistical leaders ===
Category	Player	Team	Average
Efficiency	(United States) Nick Minnerath	(Russia) Avtodor Saratov	20.6
Points	(United States) Nick Minnerath	(Russia) Avtodor Saratov	23.3
Rebounds	(United States Virgin Islands) Frank Elegar	(Russia) Enisey	9.0
Assists	(Spain) Quino Colom	(Russia) UNICS	8.4
Steals	(United States) Dijon Thompson	(Russia) Nizhny Novgorod	2.8
Blocks	(United States) Mickell Gladness	(Estonia) Kalev/Cramo	1.5
Turnovers	(United States) Demonte Harper	(Russia) Zenit Saint Petersburg	3.4
2P%	(Belarus) Artsiom Parakhouski	(Russia) UNICS	.732
3P%	(Russia) Petr Gubanov	(Russia) Nizhny Novgorod	.562
FT%	(Russia) Sergey Karasev	(Russia) Zenit Saint Petersburg	.923

Source: VTB United League

=== Individual game highs ===
Keith Langford set a new all-time scoring record for the VTB United League by scoring 42 points on October 31.

Category	Player	Team	Statistic
Efficiency	(United States) Keith Langford	(Russia) UNICS	47
Points	(United States) Keith Langford	(Russia) UNICS	42
Rebounds	(United States Virgin Islands) Frank Elegar	(Russia) Enisey	19
Assists	(Serbia) Stefan Marković	(Russia) Zenit Saint Petersburg	17
Steals	(United States) DeAndre Kane	(Russia) Nizhny Novgorod	8
Blocks	(Belarus) Artsiom Parakhouski	(Russia) UNICS	5
Three pointers	(Latvia) Jānis Blūms	(Latvia) VEF Rīga	8
Turnovers	(United States) Demonte Harper	(Russia) Zenit Saint Petersburg	8

Source: VTB United League

== Attendance data ==
Attendances include playoff games:

Pos	Team	Total	High	Low	Average	Change
1	(Russia) Parma	61,390	7,316	3,920	5,116	n/a
2	(Russia) Lokomotiv Kuban	65,312	7,139	2,161	4,354	+31.2%
3	(Russia) Zenit Saint Petersburg	61,105	5,690	1,700	3,594	+22.5%
4	(Russia) Avtodor	31,800	4,000	1,800	2,650	−17.5%
5	(Russia) Khimki	37,730	3,500	1,400	2,219	+10.6%
6	(Russia) CSKA	39,337	4,500	700	2,185	−14.4%
7	(Russia) Enisey	21,200	2,700	900	1,631	−8.3%
8	(Russia) UNICS	20,282	3,200	950	1,449	−27.7%
9	(Estonia) Kalev	13,585	3,700	500	1,132	+18.7%
10	(Belarus) Tsmoki-Minsk	13,270	2,005	730	1,106	−17.7%
11	(Latvia) VEF	10,500	2,000	400	808	+20.6%
12	(Russia) Nizhny Novgorod	9,126	1,300	500	761	−33.7%
13	(Kazakhstan) Astana	9,055	1,315	250	697	−36.0%
	League total	393,692	7,316	250	2,187	+31.0%

Source: VTB League
