= Sergey Karasev =

Russian basketball player (born 1993)

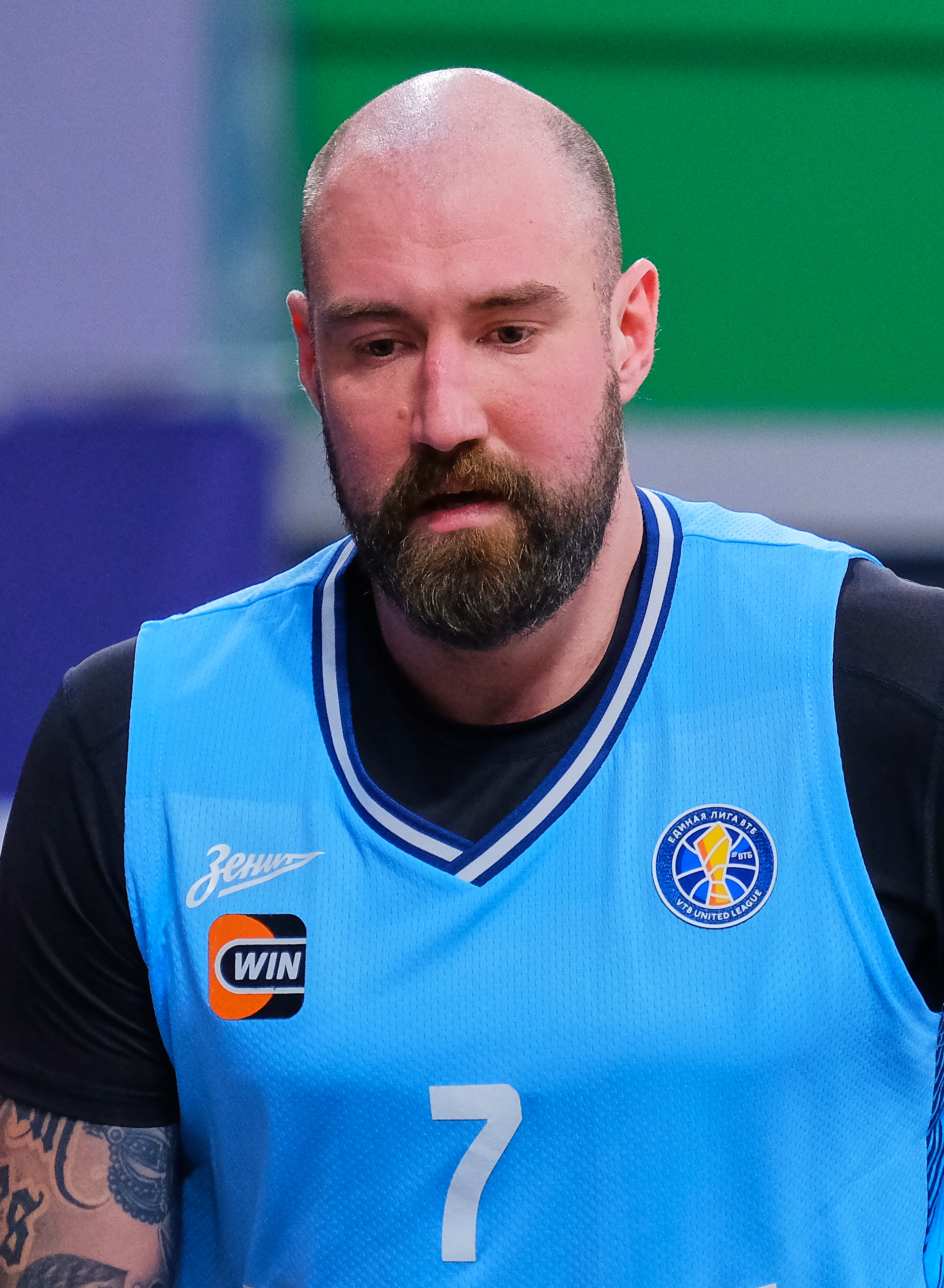
- Karasev with Zenit Saint Petersburg in 2025

No. 7 – Zenit Saint Petersburg
- Position: Power forward / small forward
- League: VTB United League

Personal information
- Born: October 26, 1993 (age 33) Saint Petersburg, Russia
- Listed height: 6 ft 7 in (2.01 m)
- Listed weight: 208 lb (94 kg)

Career information
- NBA draft: 2013: 1st round, 19th overall pick
- Drafted by: Cleveland Cavaliers
- Playing career: 2010–present

Career history
- 2010–2013: Triumph Lyubertsy
- 2013–2014: Cleveland Cavaliers
- 2013–2014: →Canton Charge
- 2014–2016: Brooklyn Nets
- 2016–2019: Zenit Saint Petersburg
- 2019–2021: Khimki Moscow
- 2021–present: Zenit Saint Petersburg

Career highlights
- VTB United League champion (2022); 2× VTB United League Supercup winner (2022, 2023); All-VTB United League First Team (2017); United League Young Player of the Year (2013); All-Russian League Second Team (2012); Russian Cup winner (2024)
- Stats at NBA.com
- Stats at Basketball Reference
Medals
Men's basketball
Representing Russia
Summer Olympic Games
Bronze medal – third place	2012 London	National Team
FIBA Under-19 World Cup
Bronze medal – third place	2011 Latvia	U-19 Team
FIBA Europe Under-18 Championship
Silver medal – second place	2010 Lithuania	U-18 Team

Sergey Vasiliyevich Karasev (Russian: Серге́й Васильевич Карасёв, Karasyov; born October 26, 1993) is a Russian professional basketball player and the team captain for Zenit Saint Petersburg of the VTB United League. He was drafted with the 19th pick in the 2013 NBA draft by the Cleveland Cavaliers.

== Professional career ==
=== Triumph Lyubertsy (2010–2013) ===
After playing for the Triumph Lyubertsy Under-23 team in 2009–10, Karasev joined the senior team for the 2010–11 PBL season. Karasev averaged 16.1 points per game during the 2012–13 season of the 2nd-tier European league, the EuroCup. On April 3, 2013, Karasev decided to declare for the NBA draft.

=== Cleveland Cavaliers (2013–2014) ===
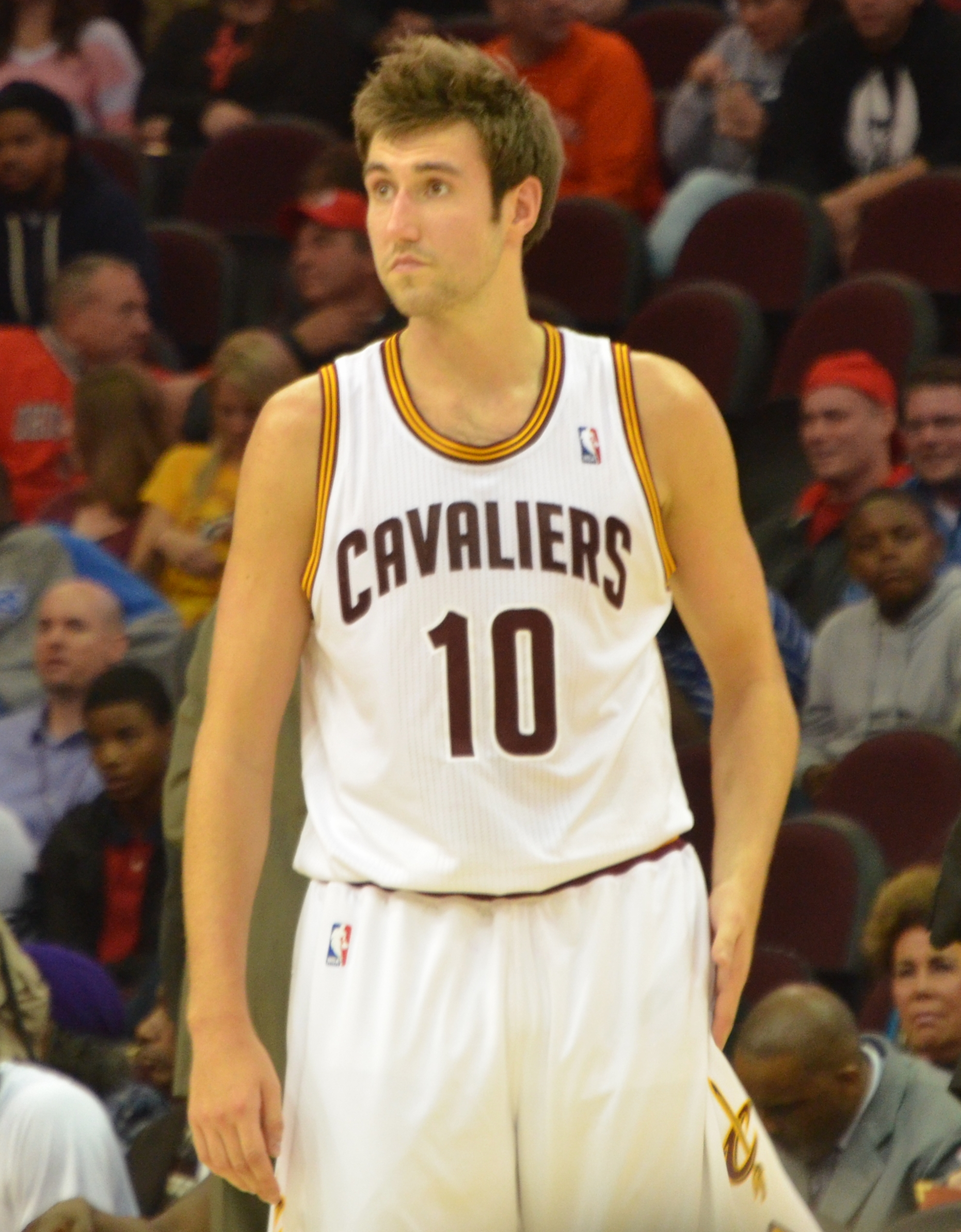
Karasev with the Cleveland Cavaliers in 2013

Karasev was selected with the 19th overall pick by the Cleveland Cavaliers in the 2013 NBA draft. On August 20, 2013, he signed his rookie scale contract with the Cavaliers. During his rookie season, he had multiple assignments with the Canton Charge of the NBA Development League.

=== Brooklyn Nets (2014–2016) ===
On July 10, 2014, Karasev was traded to the Brooklyn Nets in a three-team trade involving the Cavaliers and the Boston Celtics. On October 24, 2014, the Nets exercised their third-year team option on Karasev's rookie scale contract, extending the contract through the 2015–16 season. On March 11, 2015, he was ruled out for the rest of the 2014–15 season after being diagnosed with a dislocated patella and a torn MCL of the right knee, along with multiple loose bodies in the knee joint.

On March 26, 2016, Karasev scored a career-high 17 points in a 120–110 win over the Indiana Pacers.

=== Zenit Saint Petersburg (2016–2019) ===
On July 1, 2016, Karasev returned to Russia and signed a 2+1 deal with Zenit Saint Petersburg.

=== BC Khimki (2019–2021) ===
On July 1, 2019, Karasev signed a two-year contract with Russian club Khimki.

=== Return to Zenit Saint Petersburg (2021–present) ===
On June 7, 2021, Karasev officially returned to Zenit Saint Petersburg.

== Career statistics ==
Legend
GP	Games played	GS	Games started	MPG	Minutes per game
FG%	Field goal percentage	3P%	3-point field goal percentage	FT%	Free throw percentage
RPG	Rebounds per game	APG	Assists per game	SPG	Steals per game
BPG	Blocks per game	PPG	Points per game	**Bold**	Career high

=== NBA ===
==== Regular season ====
Year	Team	GP	GS	MPG	FG%	3P%	FT%	RPG	APG	SPG	BPG	PPG
2013–14	Cleveland	22	1	7.1	.343	.211	.900	.7	.3	.1	.0	1.7
2014–15	Brooklyn	33	**16**	**16.8**	.403	.296	.763	**2.0**	**1.4**	**.7**	.0	**4.6**
2015–16	Brooklyn	**40**	5	10.0	**.405**	**.297**	**.929**	1.5	.9	.2	**.1**	2.4
Career		95	22	11.7	.395	.282	.842	1.5	.9	.3	.0	3.0

== Russian national team ==
Karasev was a regular Russian junior national team representative as he competed at the 2009 FIBA Europe Under-16 Championship, won a silver medal at the 2010 FIBA Europe Under-18 Championship, and a bronze medal at the 2011 FIBA Under-19 World Cup.

Karasev represented the Russian senior national team for the first time at the 2012 Summer Olympics in London.

== Personal life ==
Karasev is the son of former Russian international player and former Zenit Saint Petersburg head coach, Vasily Karasev. He also used to play under his father during his time with Triumph Lyubertsy, as well as for Russia's national team during EuroBasket 2013.
