= Frank Elegar =

United States Virgin Islands basketball player (born 1986)

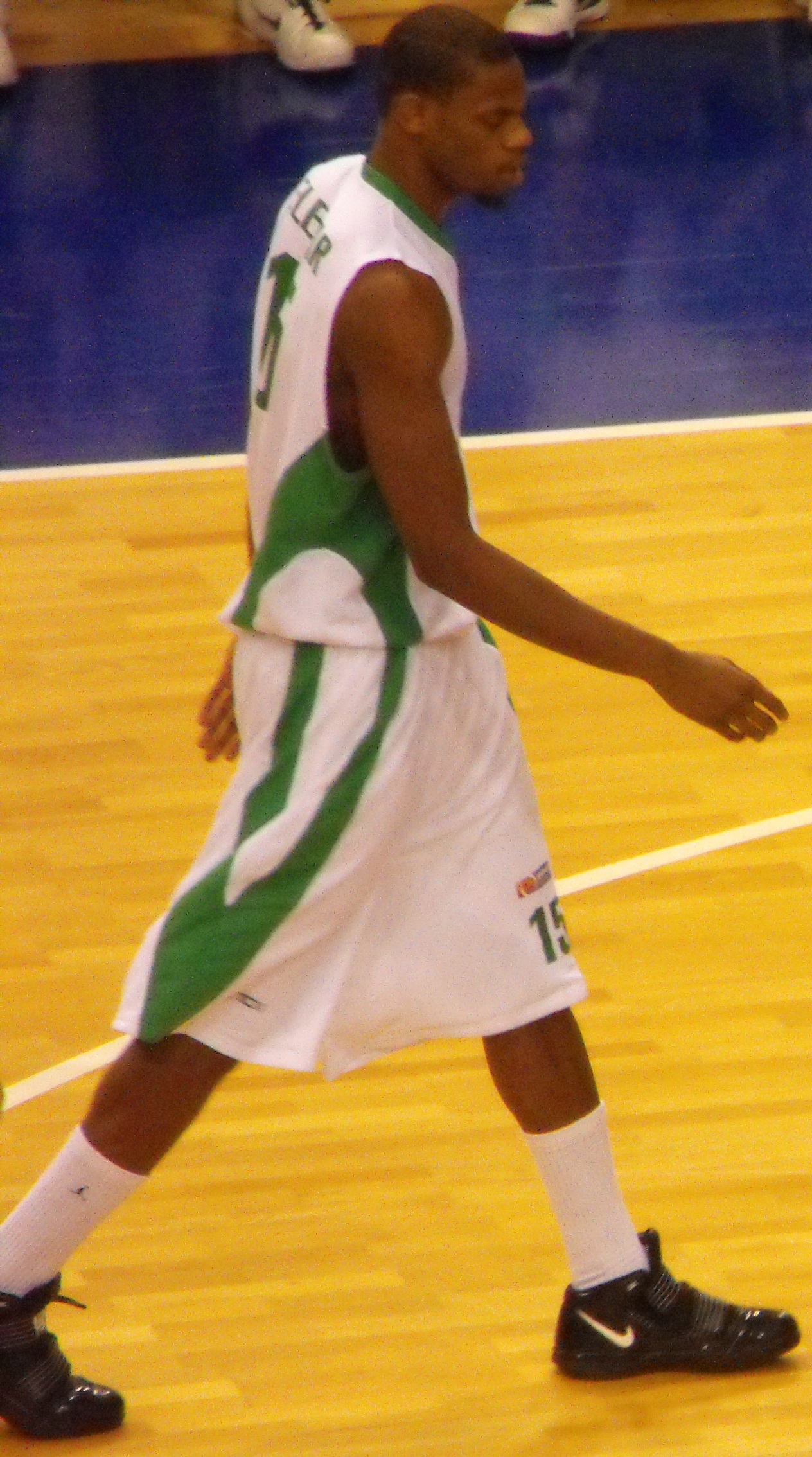
- Elegar playing for Bornova Belediye in 2009

Free agent
- Position: Center / power forward

Personal information
- Born: December 3, 1986 (age 39) New York City, New York, U.S.
- Listed height: 6 ft 10 in (2.08 m)
- Listed weight: 240 lb (109 kg)

Career information
- High school: St. Raymond (Brooklyn, New York)
- College: Drexel (2004–2008)
- NBA draft: 2008: undrafted
- Playing career: 2008–present

Career history
- 2008–2009: Eisbären Bremerhaven
- 2009–2010: Bornova Belediye
- 2010–2011: JA Vichy
- 2011–2012: Maroussi
- 2012: Antalya BB
- 2012–2013: BC Kalev
- 2013: Cangrejeros de Santurce
- 2013–2015: BC Kalev
- 2015: Olimpia Milano
- 2015–2016: TED Ankara Kolejliler
- 2016–2017: Enisey
- 2017–2018: Lokomotiv Kuban
- 2018: Afyon Belediye
- 2018–2019: Tofaş
- 2019–2020: Unicaja
- 2020–2021: Reggio Emilia
- 2021–2022: Napoli Basket

Career highlights
- 2× Estonian League champion (2013, 2014); 2× All-Estonian League (2013, 2014); 3× VTB United League rebounding leader (2014, 2015, 2017); All-VTB United League First Team (2017)
Medals
Men's basketball
Representing Virgin Islands
Centrobasket
Silver medal – second place	2006 Panama City

Frank Roderick Elegar (born December 3, 1986) is a U.S. Virgin Islands-Guyanese professional basketball player who last played for Napoli Basket of the Italian Lega Basket Serie A (LBA). He can play as either a center or a power forward.

== College career ==
After playing for St. Raymond High School for Boys in his hometown Bronx, New York, he committed to Drexel University for 2004 over interest from other Division I (NCAA) colleges Hofstra, Marist and Canisius.

Rarely playing in his freshman season, he had the biggest offensive improvement of the whole conference the next, starting the majority of games and regularly scoring in double figures whilst ranking amongst the conference's best at blocking and rebounding. He then led the Dragons in scoring and rebounding for his junior season, making the All-Colonial Athletic Association's second team and the CAA All-Tournament Team. In his final season for Drexel he led them in scoring, rebounding, blocks and field-goal percentage, was selected for All-CAA second team again and also the CAA All-Defensive Team.

== Professional career ==
Having played 2008 Portsmouth Invitational Tournament and the Orlando pre-draft camp, impressing at the first one, he declared for the 2008 NBA draft following his graduation, however he went undrafted.

Participating in the NBA Summer League with the Washington Wizards without earning a contract, he decided to move to Germany to start his professional career, signing a contract with Basketball Bundesliga side Eisbären Bremerhaven in August 2008. The team that finished dead last in the league, and he moved on to İzmir to play for newly promoted side Bornova Belediye in the Turkish League.

His second professional season was more successful than his first; on a personal level he was a starter and was in the league top 10 in rebounds and blocks whilst on a collective front his team made the playoffs losing to eventual champion Fenerbahçe.

Elegar moved on to LNB Pro A side JA Vichy in France signing for the 2010-11 season. He had solid stats for the team, finishing 11th in the league rankings for both rebounds and blocks, however Vichy struggled all season and finished in the relegation spot at the bottom of the league.

This prompted another August move, this time to Argentina where he joined Ciclista Olímpico of the Liga Nacional de Básquet; however, he was released without playing a game a few days later when the team management said he was too thin to play for the side.

His agent brought him to Maroussi of the Greek Basket League in November the same year; he was the only import player of a team banned from recruiting internationally after not paying former players, only being able to sign after the suspension was temporarily lifted for a day. It was to be a hectic time for Elegar, as the team lost every single one of their games and was in dire financial straits; after the team ran out of money to pay its players he left Maroussi in February. Returning to the Turkish league, he finished the season with mid-table side Antalya Büyükşehir Belediyesi.

=== Kalev/Cramo ===
Continuing his European tour he moved to Estonia over the summer, signing with BC Kalev/Cramo that was to play the 2012–13 season in three leagues, the multinational VTB United League and Baltic Basketball League and the local Korvpalli Meistriliiga. There he had a positive season, playing regularly in the VTB United League, one of the best in Europe, where he had good stats despite his team finishing last of their group, he did even better in the BBL where he was in the top five for rebounding and efficiency as Kalev finished third after losing to eventual champion BK Ventspils in the playoffs. The reigning champion's easy title in the weaker Estonian league after sweeping the playoffs gave Elegar his first career club silverware, along with a place in the All-KML team.

In May 2013 Elegar moved to Puerto Rico to join the Cangrejeros de Santurce of the Baloncesto Superior Nacional as a replacement for the injured Leon Williams. After playing seven games he was himself replaced by Will McDonald in June the same year and released from the club.

Following this parenthesis, he rejoined Kalev in September 2014 and proceeded to have one of his best seasons, taking over the starting center position from star defender Bamba Fall he was the best rebounder of the VTB United League despite his team only winning twice, whilst he was instrumental in another Estonian league title, finishing second in the rebounding charts (1st in total rebounds) and again in the All-KML team. In the same season he had his first taste of European competition in the second tier EuroCup where he was a good but unspectacular performer in an unsuccessful campaign, the Estonians finishing 5th in their group of 6 teams.

Elegar signed an extended contract with Kalev during the following summer. During the season, he developed his pick-and-roll combo with the point guard Scott Machado, putting up double-digit scoring averages in both VTB United League and BBL. With Fall leaving the team, Elegar became the leading rebounder in VTB United League in the 2014–2015 season with a record of 203 rebounds in 18 games. One of his outstanding games was when he scored 26 points and grabbed 10 rebounds while shooting at 100% from the field in a game against Nizhny Novgorod.

=== European moves ===
Elegar's level of play soon caught the attention of powerhouses around Europe and in February 2015 he signed for Italian team EA7 Emporio Armani Milano, Nizhny Novgorod's opponents in the Top 16 of Europe's premier competition, the EuroLeague, he left as the most efficient player of the United League and more importantly as one of Kalev's historical players.

In July 2015, Elegar signed with Turkish Super League side TED Ankara Kolejliler.

On July 20, 2016, Elegar signed with the Russian team BC Yenisey Krasnoyarsk.

On July 3, 2017, Elegar signed a two-year contract with Lokomotiv Kuban.

On August 14, 2020, Elegar signed a one-year contract with Reggio Emilia of the Italian Lega Basket Serie A (LBA) and the FIBA FIBA Europe Cup.

On July 21, 2021, Elegar signed with the newly promoted to the Serie A Napoli Basket.

== National team career ==
In 2006, at age 19 he was called up for the U.S. Virgin Islands national basketball team for the Caribbean Basketball Championship where a second-place finish gave them a place in the 2006 Centrobasket. There he contributed to a silver medal for the underdogs, beating established teams such as the Dominican Republic and Puerto Rico before losing in the final to Panama. This earned the Virgin Islanders a place in the 2007 Pan American Games where, after two close defeats including a rematch against Puerto Rico, they won against the higher ranked Canada.

The pinnacle of Elegar's international career was his participation in the 2007 FIBA Americas Championship, the continent's best tournament where he played against birth nation United States that had in their squad a plethora of NBA champions and All-Stars including LeBron James, Kobe Bryant and Jason Kidd, the game was a blowout as the U.S. Virgin Islands lost 59–123 with Elegar scoring a solitary point in 20 minutes. The next games were three close defeats against Canada, Brazil and Venezuela although Elegar lost his place as a starter.

After 2010 Centrobasket where the team could not reiterate past exploits, losing to neighbouring British Virgin Islands, he has not played for his national team, as of July 2015.

== The Basketball Tournament ==
Frank Elegar played for HBC Sicklerville in the 2018 edition of The Basketball Tournament. He scored 2 points and had 2 steals in the team's first-round loss to the Talladega Knights.

== Player profile ==
A center, he is an active player and battles hard for every rebound thanks to his athleticism. Smooth around the rim offensively he can score close to the basket, especially with a powerful dunk, or draw a foul. His weakness is his shooting, which is limited further away from the rim, also for a player who draws a lot of fouls his free throw accuracy is poor.
