= Nikita Kurbanov =

Russian basketball player

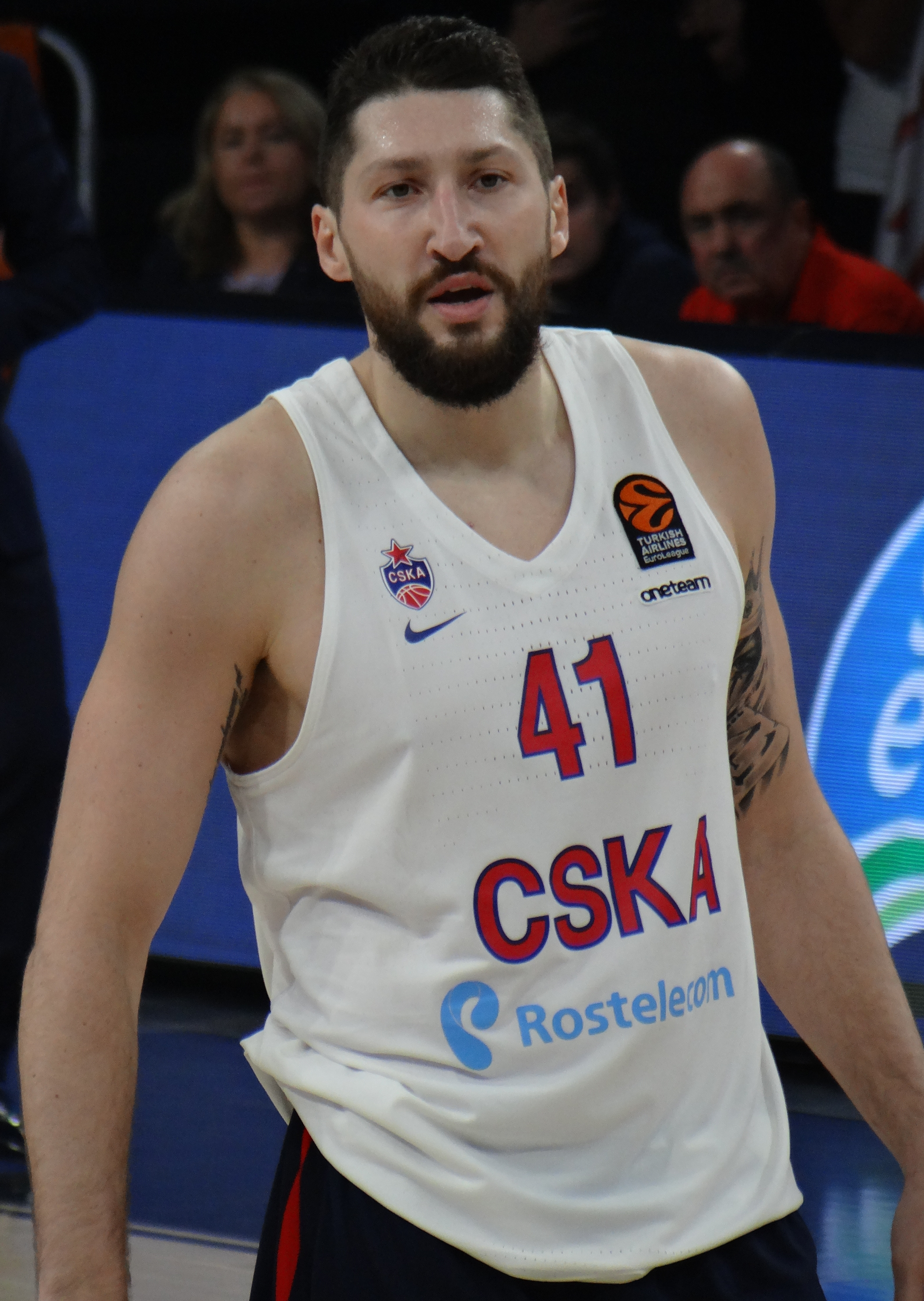
- Kurbanov in 2017

No. 41 – CSKA Moscow
- Position: Small forward
- League: VTB United League

Personal information
- Born: October 5, 1986 (age 40) Moscow, Russian SFSR, Soviet Union
- Listed height: 202 cm (6 ft 8 in)
- Listed weight: 105 kg (231 lb)

Career information
- NBA draft: 2008: undrafted
- Playing career: 2004–present

Career history
- 2004–2012: CSKA Moscow
- 2005: → Lokomotiv Rostov
- 2008: → UNICS Kazan
- 2008–2009: → Spartak Saint Petersburg
- 2012–2013: Spartak Saint Petersburg
- 2013–2014: UNICS
- 2014–2015: Lokomotiv Kuban
- 2015–present: CSKA Moscow

Career highlights
- 3× EuroLeague champion (2006, 2016, 2019); 10× VTB United League champion (2010, 2012, 2016–2019, 2021, 2024–2026); VTB United League Playoffs MVP (2019); VTB United League Defensive Player of the Year (2017); 6× Russian League champion (2005–2007, 2010–2012); 5× Russian Cup winner (2005–2007, 2010, 2014); Best Russian Young Player (2006); FIBA Europe Under-20 Championship MVP (2005)

Nikita Aleksandrovich Kurbanov (Russian: Никита Александрович Курбанов; born October 5, 1986) is a Russian professional basketball player and the team captain of CSKA Moscow of the VTB United League. Standing at 2.02 m (6 ft 7 1/2 in),

== Professional career ==
Kurbanov made his professional debut with CSKA Moscow during the 2004–05 season. He then moved to Lokomotiv Rostov, before returning to CSKA Moscow. He joined UNICS Kazan in 2008, and he spent the 2008–09 season with Spartak St. Petersburg. He then moved back to CSKA Moscow once again. On June 17, 2014, he signed a 1+1 deal with Lokomotiv Kuban.

On June 15, 2015, he signed a two-year contract with the option of third year with his former team CSKA Moscow. On May 5, 2017, Kurbanov was named VTB United League Defensive Player of the Year of the 2016–17 season. On June 18, 2021, Kurbanov extended his contract for another two (1+1) years.

== National team career ==
As a member of the junior Russian national basketball teams, Kurbanov led the 2004 FIBA Europe Under-18 Championship in scoring and he was named to the competition's All-Tournament First Team. He also won the gold medal with Russia's junior national team at the 2005 FIBA Europe Under-20 Championship. He was also named the tournament's MVP.

He has also played with the senior Russian national basketball team at the EuroBasket 2009, the EuroBasket 2015, and the EuroBasket 2017.

== Career statistics ==
Legend
GP	Games played	GS	Games started	MPG	Minutes per game
FG%	Field-goal percentage	3P%	3-point field-goal percentage	FT%	Free-throw percentage
RPG	Rebounds per game	APG	Assists per game	SPG	Steals per game
BPG	Blocks per game	PPG	Points per game	PIR	Performance index rating
**Bold**	Career high

=== EuroLeague ===
†	Denotes season in which Kurbanov won the EuroLeague
*	Led the league

Year	Team	GP	GS	MPG	FG%	3P%	FT%	RPG	APG	SPG	BPG	PPG	PIR
2005–06	CSKA Moscow	17	0	9.1	.345	.200	.706	1.6	.3	.5	**.1**	2.0	1.6
2006–07	CSKA Moscow	15	4	7.5	.458	.333	.636	1.5	.3	.2	.1	2.1	1.4
2007–08†	CSKA Moscow	3	0	8.0	**.800**	.500	**1.000**	1.7	—	.7	—	3.7	4.3
2009–10	CSKA Moscow	18	0	6.9	.333	.375	.500	1.2	.4	.2	.0	1.1	1.1
2010–11	CSKA Moscow	7	0	5.7	.667	.000	**1.000**	1.0	**.3**	.3	.0	1.4	1.7
2011–12	CSKA Moscow	6	0	11.0	.450	.333	**1.000**	2.5	.3	**1.0**	**.3**	3.8	4.7
2015–16†	CSKA Moscow	29	15	20.1	.508	.413	.889	**5.0**	1.2	.7	.1	**6.7**	**10.2**
2016–17	CSKA Moscow	35	29	19.2	.435	.333	.894	3.8	1.1	.6	**.3**	6.1	7.6
2017–18	CSKA Moscow	36*	35	18.6	.460	.333	.863	3.2	1.3	.7	.2	5.2	6.4
2018–19†	CSKA Moscow	34	28	17.8	.596	**.511**	.833	3.5	.8	.5	.2	5.7	7.8
2019–20	CSKA Moscow	28*	28*	20.3	.464	.444	.792	3.5	**1.5**	.6	**.3**	5.3	6.8
2020–21	CSKA Moscow	**39**	**39***	**22.1**	.458	.338	.718	2.6	.9	.6	**.3**	4.1	4.8
2021–22	CSKA Moscow	24	22	18.3	.479	.368	.667	2.3	1.0	.2	**.3**	4.1	4.6
Career		291	200	16.9	.477	.382	.823	3.0	.9	.5	.3	4.5	5.7
