= Rostislav Vergun =

Belarusian basketball player and coach

Rostislav Mykolaevich Vergun
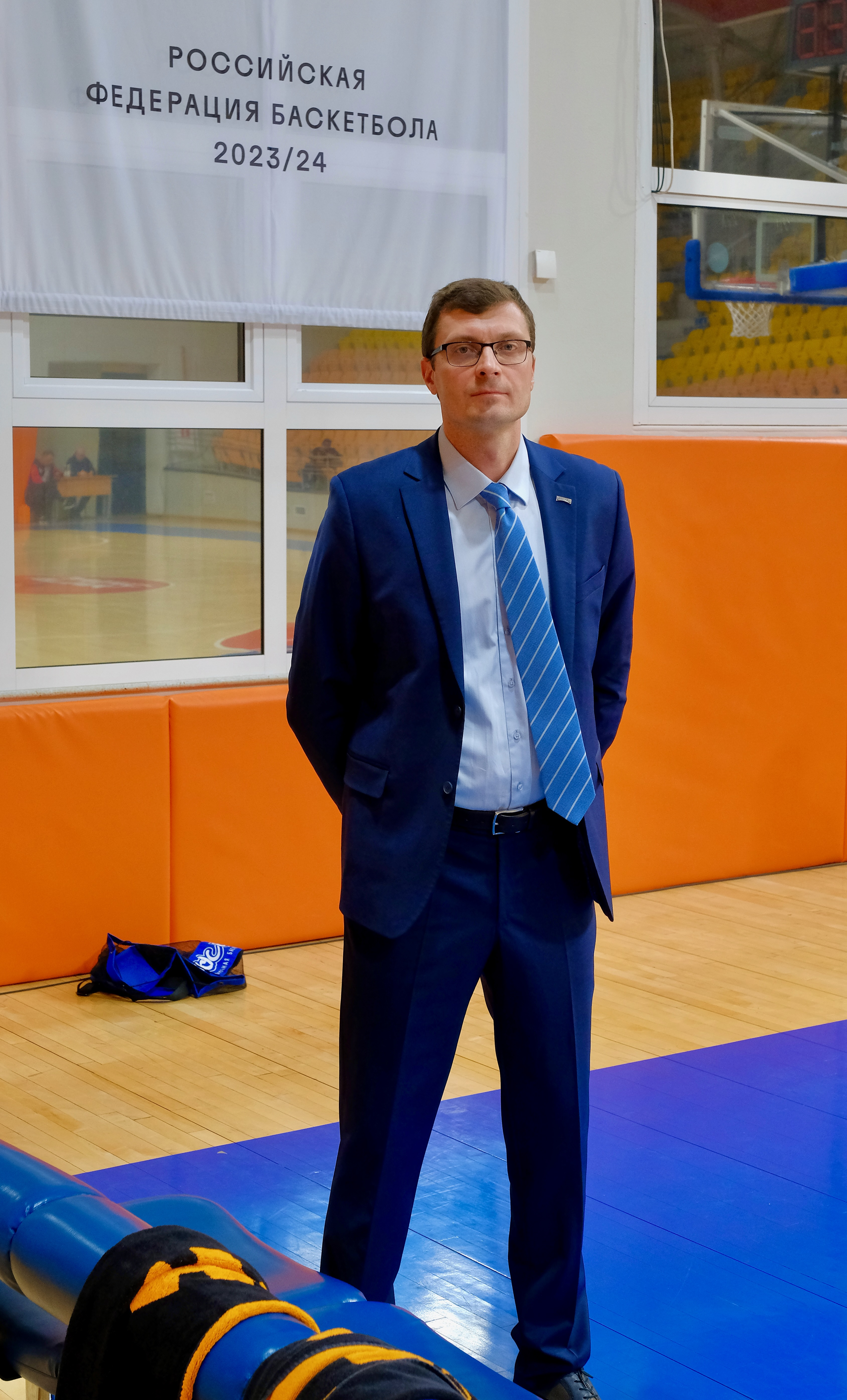
- Vergun in 2023

Avtodor Saratov
- League: VTB United League

Personal information
- Born: 26 March 1982 (age 44) Chernihiv, Ukrainian SSR, Soviet Union
- Listed height: 1.98 m (6 ft 6 in)
- Listed weight: 98 kg (216 lb)

Career information
- College: Weatherford College (2000–2003); Birmingham–Southern College (2003–2005)
- Playing career: 2004–2012
- Position: Point guard
- Coaching career: 2013–present

Career history

Playing
- 2004–2008: Mogilev's Borisfen
- 2008–2012: Minsk-2006
- 2013–2014: Mogilev's Borisfen

Coaching
- 2013–2014: Mogilev's Borisfen
- 2014–2017: Tsmoki Minsk (assistant)
- 2017–2019: Tsmoki-Minsk II
- 2019–2023: Minsk
- 2019–present: Belarus
- 2023–2026: Uralmash
- 2026: Zenit Saint Petersburg (assistant)
- 2026: Zenit Saint Petersburg (interim)
- 2026–present: Avtodor Saratov

Career highlights
- As player: 4× Belarusian League champion (2009–2012); 4× Belarusian Cup winner (2009–2012); As head coach: Russian Cup winner (2025); 5× Belarusian League champion (2019–2023); 4× Belarusian Cup winner (2019–2022)

Rostislav Mykolaevich Vergun (Russian: Ростислав Николаевич Вергун, Belarusian: Расціслаў Мікалаевіч Вергун; born 26 March 1982) is a Belarusian professional basketball coach and former player. He is currently the head coach of Avtodor Saratov and the head coach of Belarus national team.

== Career ==
He studied at the American University of Birmingham-Southern as accountancy. From 2000 to 2003 he played for Weatherford Junior College and from 2003 to 2004 for Birmingham–Southern College

After that he went to Belarus and from 2004 until 2008, he played for the Mogilev's Borisfen. From 2008 to 2012, he played for the club Minsk-2006, He played in the Non-Professional Basketball League of Belarus for BIT (2015) and Vitalyur (2015–2016), became the NBL champion (2015/2016), bronze medalist (2014/2015).

== Coaching career ==
=== Early career ===
He finished his playing career in 2012, but in the 2013/2014 season, as the head coach of Mogilev's Borisfen, he was forced to enter the field as a player due to funding problems.

In August 2014, he was appointed assistant head coach of the club Tsmoki Minsk, and in 2015 was appointed as co-trainer.

=== BC Tsmoki-Minsk II ===
In 2017, he was appointed as head coach of the reserve team BC Tsmoki-Minsk II, that won the Belarusian Premier League in 2017–18.

=== BC Tsmoki-Minsk ===
In January 2019, Vergun was appointed head coach of the Tsmoki Minsk club. In July 2020, Vergun extended his contract with Tsmoki Minsk.

=== Belarus national team ===
In December 2019, Vergun was appointed head coach of the Belarus national team.

=== BC Uralmash ===
In December 2023 he was appointed head coach of Uralmash. He led his new club to a solid seventh place in the VTB United League and earned a place in the playoffs. In March 2025, with his new club he won the Russian Basketball Cup. On 15 June 2026, following the victory against BC UNICS, Vergun resigned from the position of coach of Uralmash and few days later the position of assistant coach of Zenit Saint Petersburg.

=== BC Avtodor ===
On 15 June 2026, he was appointed as coach of Avtodor Saratov in Russian Super League.

== Honours ==
=== As a player ===
BC Tsmoki-Minsk

- Belarusian Premier League (4) 2008–09, 2009–10, 2010–11, 2011–12

=== As a Coach ===
BC Tsmoki-Minsk

- Belarusian Premier League (5) 2018–19, 2019–20, 2020–21, 2021–22, 2022–23
- Belarusian Basketball Cup (4) 2019, 2020, 2021, 2022

BC Uralmash Yekaterinburg

- Russian Basketball Cup (1): 2024-2025

=== Individual ===
- Best Belarusian Basketball Coach: (5) 2017, 2019, 2020, 2021, 2022

== Gallery ==
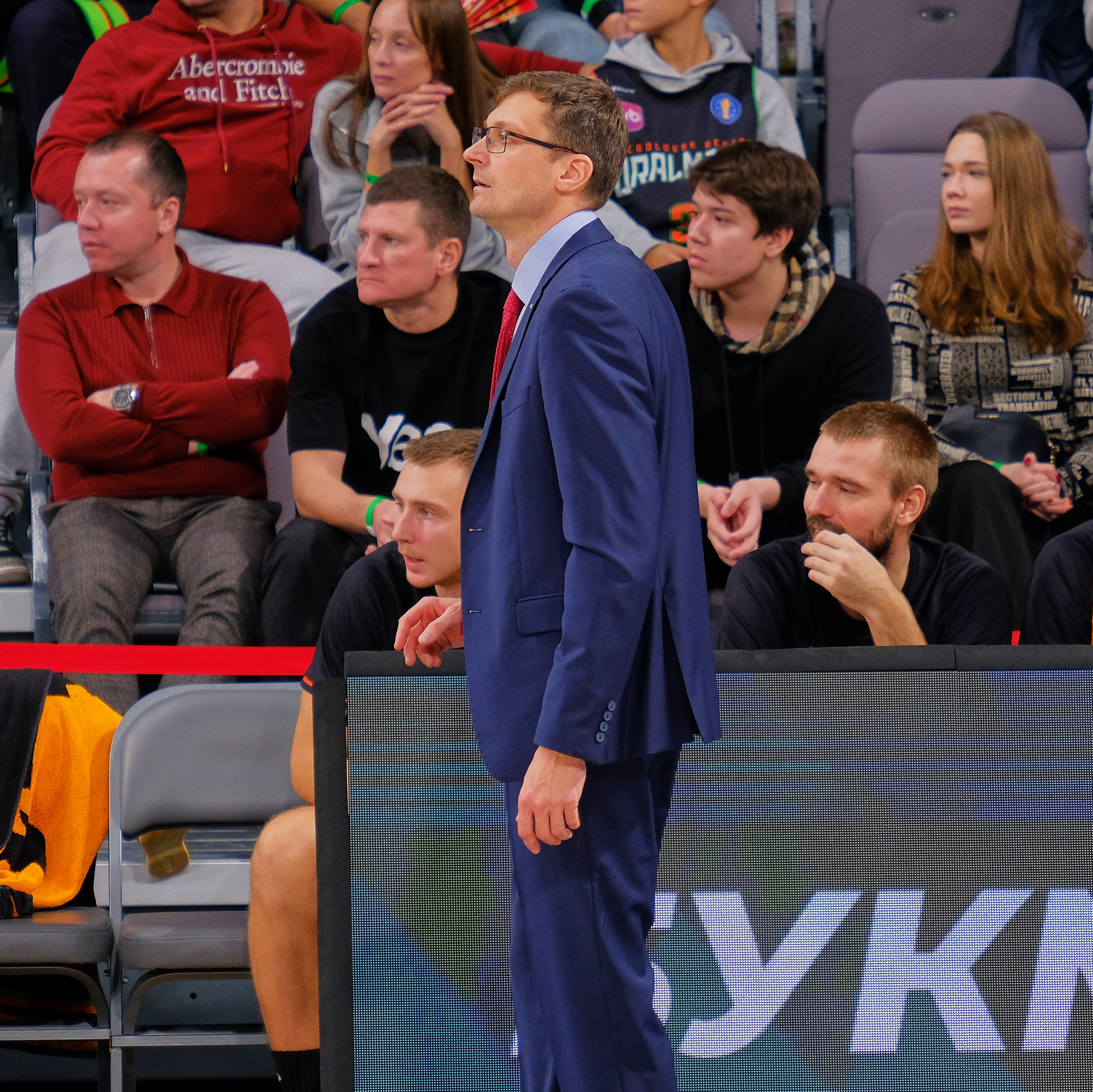

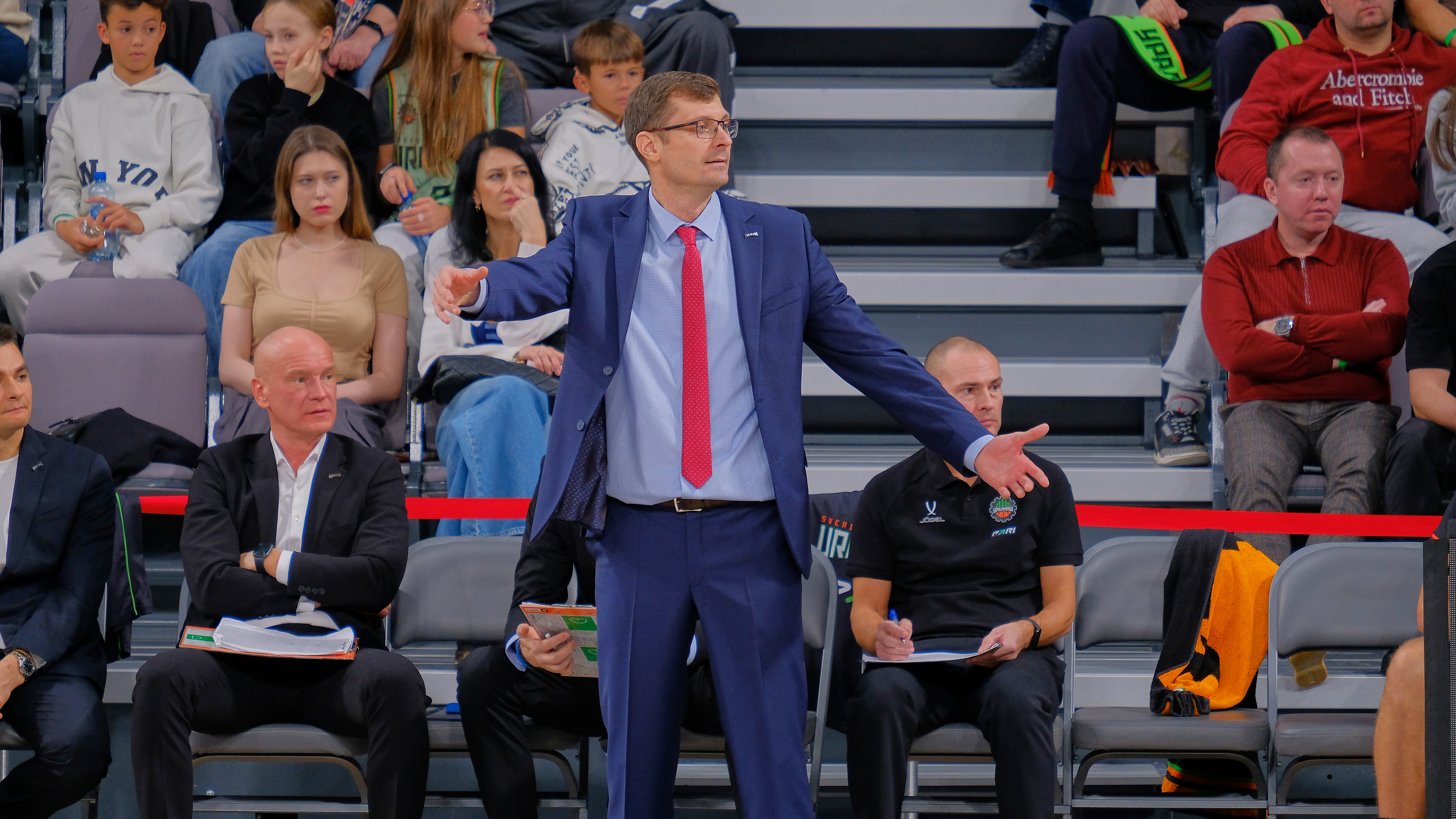

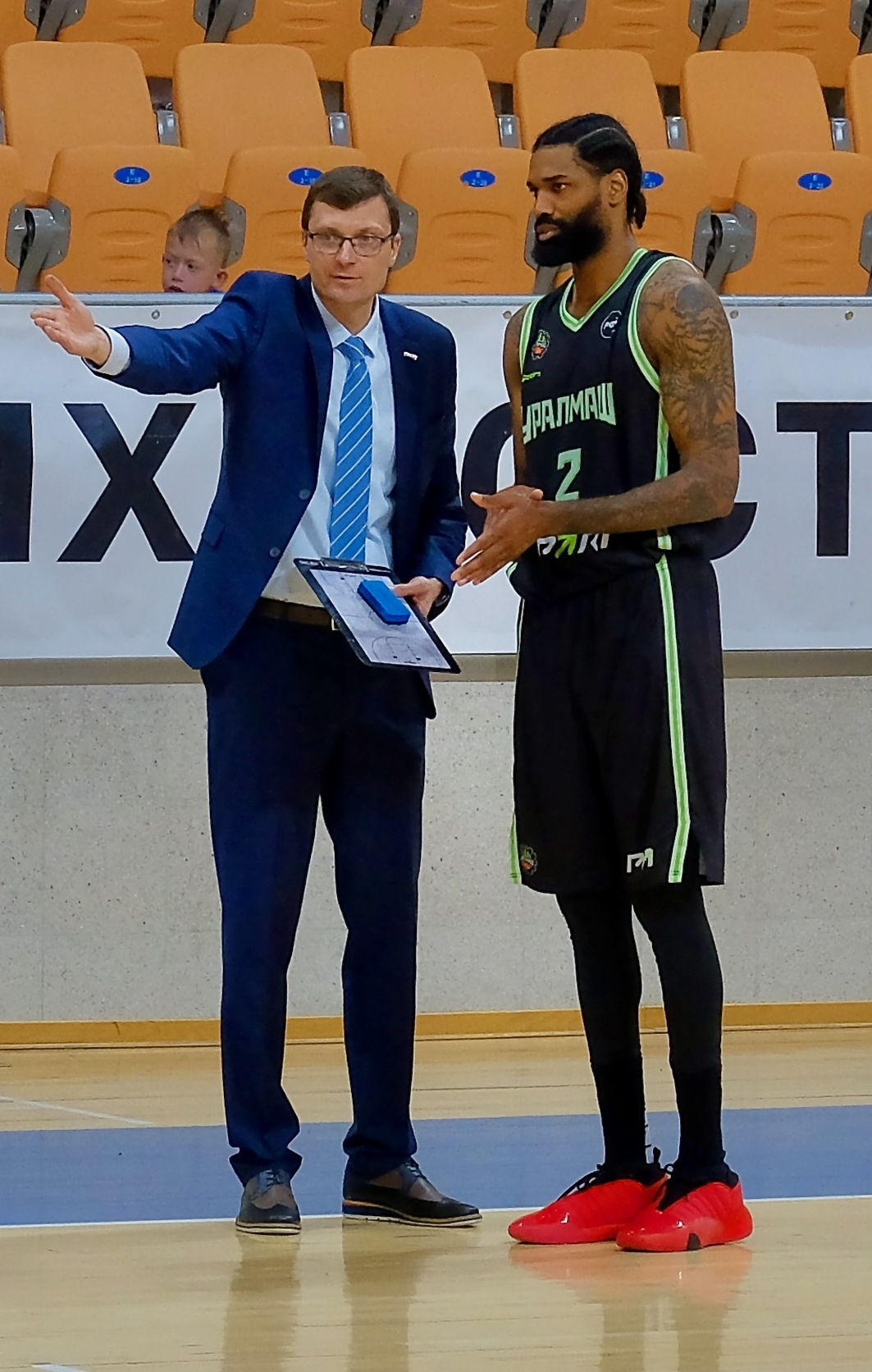

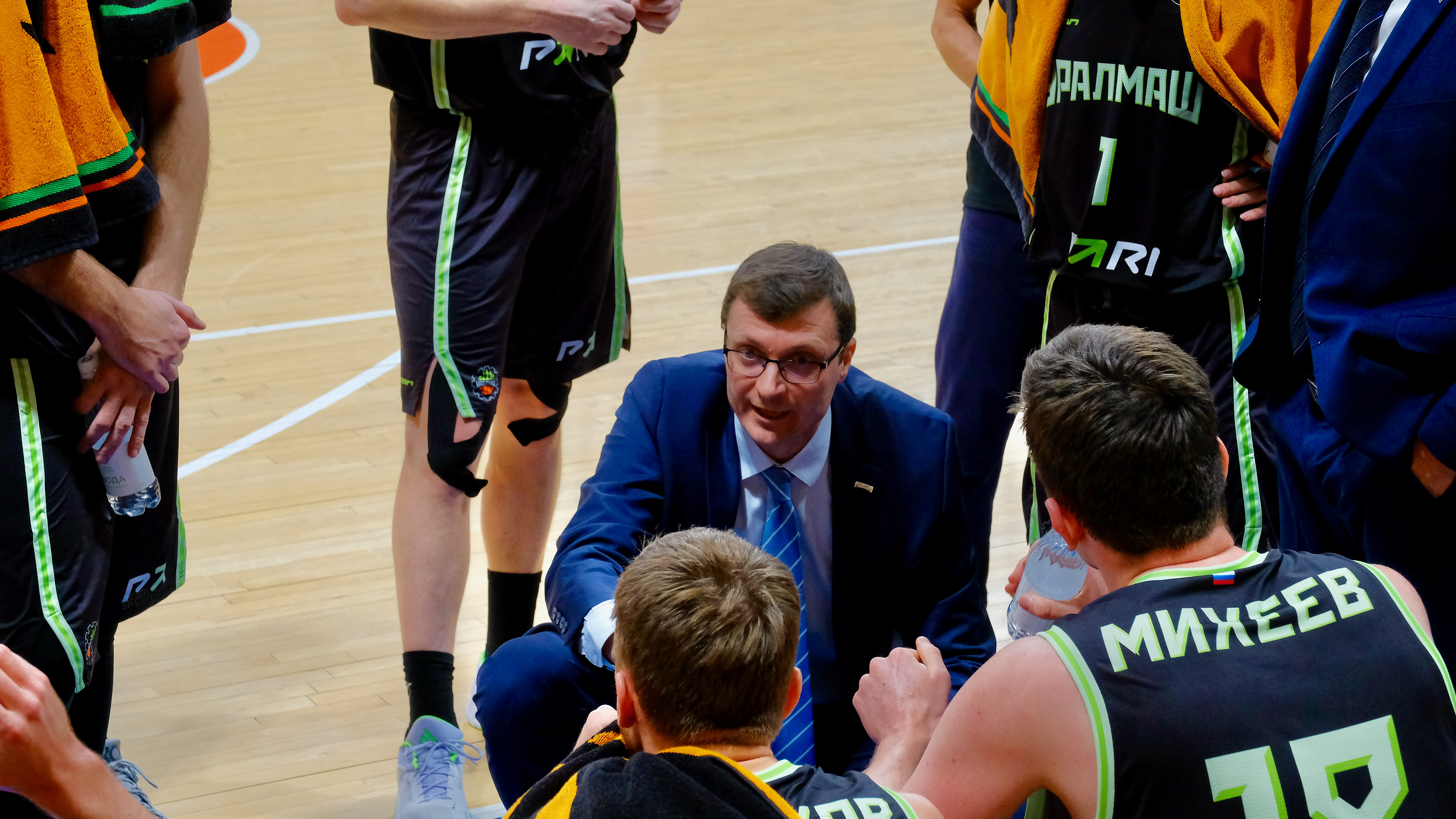
