= Devon Saddler =

American-born, naturalized Belarusian basketball player

Personal information
- Born: May 10, 1991 (age 35)
- Listed height: 6 ft 1 in (1.85 m)
- Listed weight: 210 lb (95 kg)

Career information
- High school: Aberdeen (Aberdeen, Maryland)
- College: Delaware (2010–2014)
- NBA draft: 2014: undrafted
- Playing career: 2014–2019
- Position: Point guard

Career history
- 2014–2015: Omegna
- 2015–2016: Apollon Patras
- 2016–2017: Körmend
- 2017: Jászberény
- 2017–2019: Tsmoki-Minsk
- 2019: Maccabi Rishon LeZion

Career highlights
- 2× Belarusian League champion (2018, 2019); Belarusian League MVP (2019); Belarusian Cup winner (2018); 2× First-team All-CAA (2013, 2014); Second-team All-CAA (2012); CAA Rookie of the Year (2011)

Devon Marquis Saddler (born October 27, 1992) is an American-born, naturalized Belarusian former professional basketball player. He played college basketball for the University of Delaware before playing professionally in Italy, Greece, Hungary, Belarus and Israel. A two-time Belarusian League champion with Tsmoki-Minsk, Saddler was named the Belarusian League MVP in 2019.

== Early life and college career ==
Saddler attended Aberdeen High School in Aberdeen, Maryland, where he averaged 18 points, five rebounds, six assists and three steals while leading Aberdeen to a 20–3 record in his senior year. Saddler was named 3A All-State as a junior. He also played at The Winchendon School in Winchendon, Massachusetts for the 2009–10 season.

Saddler played college basketball at the University of Delaware, where he averaged 19.7 points, 4.2 rebounds and 3.6 assists per game. On March 6, 2014, Saddler earned a spot in the First-team All-Colonial Athletic Association for two consecutive years.

== Professional career ==
=== 2014–15 season ===
On August 5, 2014, Saddler started his professional career with Fulgor Omegna of the Italian Serie A2 Basket. In 30 games played for Omegna, he averaged 17 points, 4 rebounds and 2.5 assists per game.

=== 2015–16 season ===
On September 1, 2015, Saddler signed with Cibona Zagreb of the Croatian League and the ABA League. In November 2015, he parted ways with Cibona before appearing in a game of them. On November 27, 2015, Saddler signed with Apollon Patras of the Greek Basket League. In 19 games played for Patras, he averaged 10.5 points, 3 rebounds and 2.4 assists per game.

=== 2016–17 season ===
On September 19, 2016, Saddler signed with Egis Körmend of the Hungarian Nemzeti Bajnokság I/A (NBI/A). On February 2, 2017, Saddler parted ways with Körmend to join Jászberényi KSE for the rest of the season. On April 8, 2017, Saddler recorded a career-high 35 points, shooting 13-of-20 from the field, along with six rebounds and three assists in a 90–74 win over MAFC Budapest.

=== 2017–18 season ===
On September 15, 2017, Saddler signed a two-year deal with Tsmoki-Minsk of the Belarusian Premier League and the VTB United League. Saddler won the 2018 Belarusian Premier League championship and the 2018 Belarusian Cup titles with Tsmoki-Minsk.

=== 2018–19 season ===
On April 30, 2019, Saddler recorded a season-high 30 points, shooting 11-of-19 from the field, along with five rebounds and four assists in a 70–77 loss to Nizhny Novgorod. Saddler went on to win the 2019 Belarusian Premier League championship title, leading his team to the 11th champion title in a row as he earned the Finals MVP honors.

=== 2019–20 season ===
On May 27, 2019, Saddler signed with Avtodor Saratov of the VTB United League. On August 16, 2019, he parted ways with Saratov before appearing in a game for them. On September 2, 2019, Saddler signed a one-year deal with Maccabi Rishon LeZion of the Israeli Premier League. On October 15, 2019, he parted ways with Rishon LeZion after appearing in three games.

On November 25, 2019, Saddler announced his retirement from playing professional basketball.

== Belarus national team ==
Saddler was a member of the Belarus national basketball team. In 4 games played during the 2019 FIBA World Cup Qualifiers, he averaged 16 points, 6.8 assists and 4.8 rebounds per game. On February 26, 2018, Saddler made a key contribution to a sensational 93–92 win of the Belarusian team over Slovenia, recording 25 points, 8 assists and 5 rebounds.
