= Roman Rubinshteyn =

Belarusian-Israeli basketball player

No. 7 – Grodno-93
- Position: Shooting guard / point guard
- League: Belarusian Premier League

Personal information
- Born: May 22, 1996 (age 30) Minsk, Belarus
- Listed height: 1.95 m (6 ft 5 in)
- Listed weight: 82 kg (181 lb)

Career information
- NBA draft: 2018: undrafted
- Playing career: 2012–present

Career history
- 2012–2016: Tsmoki-Minsk
- 2012–2016: →Tsmoki-Minsk II
- 2016–2017: Zlatorog Laško
- 2017–2018: Tsmoki-Minsk
- 2018–2019: Legia Warszawa
- 2019: Hapoel Be'er Sheva
- 2019–2020: Hapoel Hevel Modi'in
- 2020–2022: Maccabi Haifa
- 2022–2026: BC Minsk
- 2026–present: BK Grodno-93

Career highlights
- Belarusian League champion (2018); Belarusian Cup winner (2018)

Roman Rubinshteyn (Hebrew: רומן רובינשטיין; born August 22, 1996) is a Belarusian-Israeli professional basketball player for BK Grodno-93 of the Belarusian Premier League. Standing at 6 ft 5 in (1.96 m), he plays at the shooting guard and point guard positions.

== Early life ==
Rubinshteyn was born in Minsk, Belarus. He played for Tsmoki-Minsk youth team.

== Professional career ==
In 2012, Rubinshteyn started his professional career with Tsmoki-Minsk II, the reserve team of Tsmoki-Minsk.

On August 30, 2016, Rubinshteyn signed with Zlatorog Laško of the Slovenian Premier A. Rubinshteyn helped Zlatorog reach the 2017 Slovenian League playoffs as the third seed, but they eventually lost to Rogaška in the Semifinals.

In July 2017, Rubinshteyn returned to Tsmoki-Minsk for the 2017–18 season. On December 16, 2017, Rubinshteyn recorded a career-high 29 points, shooting 19-for-20 from the free throw line, along with six rebounds and four assists in a 94–99 loss to Borisfen Mogilev. In 46 games played during the 2017–18 season, he averaged 11.3 points, 3.5 rebounds and 3 assists and 1.6 steals per game. Rubinshteyn won the 2018 Belarusian League and the 2018 Belarusian Cup titles with Tsmoki-Minsk.

On July 30, 2018, Rubinshteyn signed a one-year deal with Legia Warszawa of the Polish Basketball League. However, on February 15, 2019, Rubinshteyn parted ways with Legia to join Hapoel Be'er Sheva of the Israeli Premier League. On July 1, 2019, he parted ways with Be'er Sheva.

On August 22, 2019, Rubinshteyn signed with Hapoel Hevel Modi'in of the Israeli National League for the 2019–20 season.

On January 24, 2021, Rubinshteyn signed with Maccabi Haifa of the Israeli Basketball Premier League for the 2020–21 season.

== National team career ==
Rubinshteyn is a member of the Belarus national basketball team. He was also a member of the Under-16, Under-18 and Under-20 Belarus national teams.

In July 2015, Rubinshteyn participated in the 2015 FIBA Europe Under-20 Championship Division B, where he averaged 12.4 points, 4.1 rebounds and 4.4 assists, leading the U-20 Belarusian team to the fifth place.

== Personal life ==
Rubinshteyn also holds an Israeli passport.
