= FIBA Europe Cup records and statistics =

Basketball competition statistics

Map of countries, teams from which have reached the regular season of the FIBA Europe Cup. FIBA member country that has been represented in the regular season FIBA member country that has been represented in the qualifying rounds Not represented (As of 19 May 2019)

This page details statistics of the FIBA Europe Cup. Unless notified these statistics concern all seasons since inception of the FIBA Europe Cup in the 2015–16 season, including qualifying rounds.

== Winners and runners-up ==
=== By club ===
Club	Winners	Runners-up	Years won	Years runner-up
(Spain) Bilbao Basket	2	0	2025, 2026	–
(Turkey) Bahçeşehir Koleji	1	1	2022	2024
(Germany) Skyliners Frankfurt	1	0	2016	–
(France) Nanterre 92	1	0	2017	–
(Italy) Reyer Venezia	1	0	2018	–
(Italy) Dinamo Sassari	1	0	2019	–
(Israel) Ironi Nes Ziona	1	0	2021	–
(Poland) Anwil Włocławek	1	0	2023	–
(Germany) Niners Chemnitz	1	0	2024	–
(Greece) PAOK	0	2	–	2025, 2026
(Italy) Varese	0	1	–	2016
(France) Élan Chalon	0	1	–	2017
(Italy) Felice Scandone	0	1	–	2018
(Germany) Würzburg	0	1	–	2019
(Poland) Stal Ostrów Wielkopolski	0	1	–	2021
(Italy) Reggiana	0	1	–	2022
(France) Cholet Basket	0	1	–	2023

=== By country ===
Club	Winners	Runners-up	Winning clubs	Runner-up clubs
Italy	2	3	Dinamo Sassari (1), Reyer Venezia (1)	Varese (1), Felice Scandone (1), Reggiana (1)
Germany	2	1	Skyliners Frankfurt (1), Niners Chemnitz (1)	Würzburg (1)
Spain	2	0	Bilbao Basket (2)	
France	1	2	Nanterre 92 (1)	Élan Chalon (1), Cholet Basket (1)
Poland	1	1	Anwil Włocławek (1)	Stal Ostrów Wielkopolski (1)
Turkey	1	1	Bahçeşehir Koleji (1)	Bahçeşehir Koleji (1)
Israel	1	0	Ironi Nes Ziona (1)	
Greece	0	2		PAOK (2)

== Semi-final appearances ==
=== By club ===
Club	No.	Years
(Italy) Varese	3	**2016**, 2019, 2024
(Denmark) Bakken Bears	3	2018, 2020, 2022
(Turkey) Bahçeşehir Koleji	3	2020, **2022**, **2024**
(Spain) Surne Bilbao Basket	3	2024, **2025**, **2026**
(France) Élan Chalon	2	2016, **2017**
(France) Cholet Basket	2	**2023**, 2025
(Greece) PAOK	2	**2025**, **2026**
(Russia) Enisey	1	2016
(Germany) Skyliners Frankfurt	1	**2016**
(Germany) Bonn	1	2017
(France) Nanterre 92	1	**2017**
(Belgium) Oostende	1	2017
(Netherlands) Donar	1	2018
(Italy) Felice Scandone	1	**2018**
(Italy) Reyer Venezia	1	**2018**
(Italy) Dinamo Sassari	1	**2019**
(Israel) Hapoel Holon	1	2019
(Germany) Würzburg	1	**2019**
(Germany) Bayreuth	1	2020
(Turkey) Karşıyaka	1	2020
(Romania) CSM Oradea	1	2021
(Israel) Ironi Nes Ziona	1	**2021**
(Russia) Parma	1	2021
(Poland) Stal Ostrów Wielkopolski	1	**2021**
(Italy) Reggiana	1	**2022**
(Netherlands) ZZ Leiden	1	2022
(Poland) Anwil Włocławek	1	**2023**
(Estonia) Kalev/Cramo	1	2023
(Finland) Karhu	1	2023
(Germany) Niners Chemnitz	1	**2024**
(France) JDA Dijon	1	2025
(Hungary) Falco Szombathely	1	2026
(Spain) UCAM Murcia	1	2026

Team in Bold:	Finalist team in season

== Participating clubs in the FIBA Europe Cup ==
The following is a list of clubs that have played in or qualified for FIBA Europe Cup group stages.

Underlined: club won the FIBA Europe Cup.

Nation	No.	Clubs	Years
Turkey (14)	3	Gaziantep	2015–16, 2016–17, 2022–23
Turkey (14)	3	Bahçeşehir Koleji	2019–20, 2021–22, 2023–24
Turkey (14)	2	Büyükçekmece	2016–17, 2017–18
Turkey (14)	2	İstanbul BB	2017–18, 2018–19
Turkey (14)	2	Karşıyaka	2018–19, 2019–20
Turkey (14)	2	Körfez	2023–24, 2026–27
Turkey (14)	1	Türk Telekom	2015–16
Turkey (14)	1	Sakarya BB	2018–19
Turkey (14)	1	Beşiktaş	2020–21
Turkey (14)	1	Bursaspor	2024–25
Turkey (14)	1	Tofaş	2024–25
Turkey (14)	1	Petkim Spor	2025–26
Turkey (14)	1	Denizli	2026–27
Turkey (14)	1	Esenler Eroksport	2026–27
Romania (13)	9	Oradea	2018–19, 2019–20, 2020–21, 2021–22, 2022–23, 2023–24, 2024–25, 2025–26, 2026–27
Romania (13)	3	U-BT Cluj-Napoca	2016–17, 2017–18, 2019–20
Romania (13)	3	Sibiu	2019–20, 2020–21, 2023–24
Romania (13)	2	Steaua București	2016–17, 2018–19
Romania (13)	2	U Craiova	2022–23, 2026–27
Romania (13)	1	Energia Târgu Jiu	2015–16
Romania (13)	1	Mureș	2016–17
Romania (13)	1	Voluntari	2022–23
Romania (13)	1	Argeș Pitești	2024–25
Romania (13)	1	Constanța	2024–25
Romania (13)	1	Corona Brașov	2025–26
Romania (13)	1	Vâlcea 1924	2025–26
Romania (13)	1	Dinamo București	2026–27
Germany (13)	2	Bayreuth	2019–20, 2021–22
Germany (13)	2	Crailsheim Merlins	2021–22, 2022–23
Germany (13)	2	Chemnitz	2022–23, 2023–24
Germany (13)	2	Rostock Seawolves	2023–24, 2025–26
Germany (13)	2	Braunschweig	2024–25, 2025–26
Germany (13)	2	Würzburg	2018–19, 2026–27
Germany (13)	1	Skyliners Frankfurt	2015–16
Germany (13)	1	Bonn	2016–17
Germany (13)	1	Bamberg	2022–23
Germany (13)	1	Göttingen	2023–24
Germany (13)	1	Ludwigsburg	2024–25
Germany (13)	1	Rasta Vechta	2025–26
Germany (13)	1	Gladiators Trier	2026–27
Poland (12)	5	Anwil Włocławek	2020–21, 2022–23, 2023–24, 2024–25, 2025–26
Poland (12)	3	Legia Warsaw	2019–20, 2021–22, 2023–24
Poland (12)	2	Spójnia Stargard	2023–24, 2024–25
Poland (12)	2	Trefl Sopot	2021–22, 2025–26
Poland (12)	1	Radom	2015–16
Poland (12)	1	Śląsk Wrocław	2015–16
Poland (12)	1	Turów Zgorzelec	2015–16
Poland (12)	1	Stal Ostrów Wielkopolski	2020–21
Poland (12)	1	Start Lublin	2025–26
Poland (12)	1	Dziki Warsaw	2026–27
Poland (12)	1	Szczecin	2026–27
Poland (12)	1	Zielona Góra	2026–27
France (10)	3	Élan Chalon	2015–16, 2016–17, 2026–27
France (10)	2	Gravelines	2016–17, 2023–24
France (10)	2	Le Portel	2017–18, 2024–25
France (10)	2	Cholet	2022–23, 2024–25
France (10)	2	Dijon	2024–25, 2025–26
France (10)	1	ASVEL	2015–16
France (10)	1	Le Havre	2015–16
France (10)	1	Nanterre 92	2016–17
France (10)	1	Pau-Orthez	2016–17
France (10)	1	Nancy	2026–27
Greece (9)	2	Peristeri	2021–22, 2025–26
Greece (9)	2	PAOK	2024–25, 2025–26
Greece (9)	2	Iraklis	2020–21, 2026–27
Greece (9)	1	Ionikos	2021–22
Greece (9)	1	Aris	2018–19
Greece (9)	1	Maroussi	2024–25
Greece (9)	1	Kolossos Rodou	2026–27
Greece (9)	1	Mykonos	2026–27
Greece (9)	1	Promitheas	2026–27
Belgium (7)	7	Antwerp Giants	2015–16, 2016–17, 2017–18, 2021–22, 2022–23, 2024–25, 2025–26
Belgium (7)	6	Mons-Hainaut	2015–16, 2016–17, 2017–18, 2018–19, 2020–21, 2021–22
Belgium (7)	4	Spirou	2017–18, 2018–19, 2019–20, 2024–25
Belgium (7)	3	Phoenix Brussels	2016–17, 2017–18, 2019–20
Belgium (7)	2	Limburg United	2016–17, 2024–25
Belgium (7)	2	Oostende	2015–16, 2026–27
Belgium (7)	1	Kangoeroes Mechelen	2022–23
Israel (7)	3	Ironi Nes Ziona	2018–19, 2019–20, 2020–21
Israel (7)	2	Bnei Herzliya	2016–17, 2017–18
Israel (7)	1	Maccabi Rishon LeZion	2015–16
Israel (7)	1	Hapoel Eilat	2021–22
Israel (7)	1	Hapoel Gilboa Galil	2021–22
Israel (7)	1	Hapoel Galil Elyon	2022–23
Israel (7)	1	Hapoel Haifa	2022–23
Hungary (6)	6	Körmend	2015–16, 2016–17, 2017–18, 2019–20, 2020–21, 2022–23
Hungary (6)	6	Szolnoki Olajbányász	2017–18, 2018–19, 2020–21, 2021–22, 2024–25, 2026–27
Hungary (6)	5	Alba Fehérvár	2016–17, 2017–18, 2018–19, 2023–24, 2024–25
Hungary (6)	4	Falco Szombathely	2015–16, 2017–18, 2018–19, 2025–26
Hungary (6)	2	Sopron	2015–16, 2016–17
Hungary (6)	1	PVSK Panthers	2019–20
Ukraine (6)	4	Dnipro	2018–19, 2019–20, 2020–21, 2024–25
Ukraine (6)	3	Kyiv-Basket	2019–20, 2020–21, 2021–22
Ukraine (6)	2	Khimik	2015–16, 2017–18
Ukraine (6)	1	Cherkaski Mavpy	2018–19
Ukraine (6)	1	Prometey	2020–21
Ukraine (6)	1	Budivelnyk	2022–23
Lithuania (6)	2	Šiauliai	2015–16, 2016–17
Lithuania (6)	1	Juventus	2015–16
Lithuania (6)	1	Pieno Žvaigždės	2015–16
Lithuania (6)	1	Prienai	2016–17
Lithuania (6)	1	Nevėžis	2017–18
Lithuania (6)	1	Jonava	2023–24
Bulgaria (5)	9	Rilski Sportist	2015–16, 2016–17, 2018–19, 2020–21, 2021–22, 2022–23, 2024–25, 2025–26, 2026–27
Bulgaria (5)	7	Balkan Botevgrad	2017–18, 2018–19, 2019–20, 2020–21, 2022–23, 2023–24, 2024–25
Bulgaria (5)	3	Academic	2015–16, 2016–17, 2017–18
Bulgaria (5)	2	Levski	2018–19, 2019–20
Bulgaria (5)	2	Lokomotiv Plovdiv	2026–27
Cyprus (5)	7	AEK Larnaca	2015–16, 2016–17, 2018–19, 2023–24, 2024–25, 2025–26, 2026–27
Cyprus (5)	7	Keravnos	2017–18, 2019–20, 2022–23, 2023–24, 2024–25, 2025–26, 2026–27
Cyprus (5)	2	APOEL	2016–17, 2019–20
Cyprus (5)	2	Anorthosis Famagusta	2024–25, 2025–26
Cyprus (5)	1	ETHA Engomis	2015–16
Kosovo (5)	5	Prishtina	2015–16, 2016–17, 2017–18, 2018–19, 2019–20
Kosovo (5)	4	Trepça	2023–24, 2024–25, 2025–26, 2026–27
Kosovo (5)	2	Peja	2016–17, 2023–24
Kosovo (5)	2	Bashkimi	2025–26, 2026–27
Kosovo (5)	1	Ylli	2022–23
Slovakia (5)	4	Patrioti Levice	2022–23, 2023–24, 2024–25, 2026–27
Slovakia (5)	4	Prievidza	2016–17, 2024–25, 2025–26, 2026–27
Slovakia (5)	2	Inter Bratislava	2015–16, 2019–20
Slovakia (5)	1	Komárno	2015–16
Slovakia (5)	1	Nitra Blue Wings	2026–27
Italy (5)	3	Varese	2015–16, 2018–19, 2023–24
Italy (5)	3	Dinamo Sassari	2018–19, 2024–25, 2025–26
Italy (5)	3	Reggiana	2020–21, 2021–22, 2025–26
Italy (5)	2	Brindisi	2022–23, 2023–24
Italy (5)	1	Cantù	2015–16
Austria (5)	5	Kapfenberg Bulls	2015–16, 2017–18, 2019–20, 2020–21, 2021–22
Austria (5)	1	Güssing Knights	2015–16
Austria (5)	1	Oberwart Gunners	2016–17
Austria (5)	1	Swans Gmunden	2022–23
Austria (5)	1	Vienna	2026–27
Netherlands (4)	8	Donar	2015–16, 2016–17, 2017–18, 2018–19, 2019–20, 2020–21, 2021–22, 2022–23
Netherlands (4)	6	Heroes Den Bosch	2015–16, 2018–19, 2020–21, 2021–22, 2022–23, 2023–24
Netherlands (4)	5	ZZ Leiden	2015–16, 2018–19, 2019–20, 2021–22, 2023–24
Netherlands (4)	1	Landstede Hammers	2019–20
Estonia (4)	6	Kalev	2015–16, 2022–23, 2023–24, 2024–25, 2025–26, 2026–27
Estonia (4)	4	Tartu	2015–16, 2016–17, 2025–26, 2026–27
Estonia (4)	2	Pärnu	2022–23, 2024–25
Estonia (4)	1	Tallinna Kalev	2016–17
Spain (4)	4	Zaragoza	2021–22, 2023–24, 2024–25, 2025–26
Spain (4)	3	Bilbao	2023–24, 2024–25, 2025–26
Spain (4)	1	Murcia	2025–26
Spain (4)	1	Girona	2026–27
Russia (4)	3	Enisey	2015–16, 2016–17, 2019–20
Russia (4)	3	Avtodor	2017–18, 2018–19, 2021–22
Russia (4)	2	Parma	2020–21, 2021–22
Russia (4)	1	Nizhny Novgorod	2017–18
Czech Republic (4)	3	Opava	2021–22, 2022–23, 2026–27
Czech Republic (4)	2	Pardubice	2016–17, 2018–19
Czech Republic (4)	2	Nymburk	2015–16, 2023–24
Czech Republic (4)	1	Brno	2025–26
Azerbaijan (4)	2	Sabah	2023–24, 2024–25
Azerbaijan (4)	2	Absheron Lions	2025–26, 2026–27
Azerbaijan (4)	2	Neftçi	2025–26, 2026–27
Azerbaijan (4)	1	Gence	2026–27
United Kingdom (4)	2	Caledonia Gladiators	2023–24, 2024–25
United Kingdom (4)	1	Leicester Riders	2018–19
United Kingdom (4)	1	London Lions	2021–22
United Kingdom (4)	1	Manchester	2026–27
(Georgia (country)) Georgia (4)	2	Kutaisi 2010	2024–25, 2025–26
(Georgia (country)) Georgia (4)	1	Dinamo Tbilisi	2017–18
(Georgia (country)) Georgia (4)	1	TSU Tbilisi	2023–24
(Georgia (country)) Georgia (4)	1	Batumi	2026–27
Slovenia (4)	1	Helios Suns	2015–16
Slovenia (4)	1	Krka	2015–16
Slovenia (4)	1	Šentjur	2015–16
Slovenia (4)	1	Zlatorog Laško	2015–16
North Macedonia (4)	1	Kumanovo	2015–16
North Macedonia (4)	1	Karpoš Sokoli	2017–18
North Macedonia (4)	1	Pelister	2025–26
North Macedonia (4)	1	MZT Skopje	2026–27
Portugal (3)	9	Porto	2015–16, 2016–17, 2017–18, 2018–19, 2021–22, 2022–23, 2023–24, 2024–25, 2025–26
Portugal (3)	7	Sporting CP	2020–21, 2021–22, 2022–23, 2023–24, 2024–25, 2025–26, 2026–27
Portugal (3)	6	Benfica	2015–16, 2016–17, 2017–18, 2019–20, 2021–22, 2026–27
Finland (3)	5	Kataja	2015–16, 2017–18, 2018–19, 2019–20, 2023–24
Finland (3)	2	Karhu	2022–23, 2023–24
Finland (3)	1	KTP	2015–16
Sweden (3)	3	Södertälje Kings	2015–16, 2016–17, 2019–20
Sweden (3)	3	Norrköping Dolphins	2022–23, 2023–24, 2024–25
Sweden (3)	1	Borås	2015–16
Latvia (3)	2	Ventspils	2015–16, 2019–20
Latvia (3)	1	Valmiera Glass Via	2026–27
Latvia (3)	1	VEF Rīga	2026–27
Croatia (3)	2	Cibona	2015–16, 2025–26
Croatia (3)	1	Cedevita Junior	2025–26
Croatia (3)	1	Split	2026–27
Switzerland (2)	5	Fribourg Olympic	2019–20, 2020–21, 2022–23, 2024–25, 2026–27
Switzerland (2)	1	Lions de Genève	2026–27
Denmark (1)	8	Bakken Bears	2015–16, 2017–18, 2018–19, 2019–20, 2021–22, 2023–24, 2025–26, 2026–27
Belarus (1)	6	Tsmoki-Minsk	2015–16, 2016–17, 2017–18, 2018–19, 2019–20, 2021–22
Montenegro (1)	3	Mornar	2017–18, 2021–22, 2023–24
Bosnia and Herzegovina (1)	2	Bosna	2017–18, 2025–26
(Republic of Ireland) Ireland (1)	1	Hibernia	2015–16
Kazakhstan (1)	1	Astana	2015–16

== Clubs ==
=== Performance review ===
==== Classification ====
C	Champion
RU	Runner-up
3rd	Third qualified
4th	Fourth qualified
SF	Eliminated in the semifinalist
QF	Eliminated in the quarterfinals
R16	Eliminated in round of 16
R32	Eliminated in the round of 32
2R	Eliminated in the second round
RS	Eliminated in the regular season
•	Ongoing

==== Performance ====
Clubs (# of participations)		15–16	16–17	17–18
France (8)		(3)	(4)	(1)
1	Élan Chalon (2)	3rd	RU	
2	ASVEL (1)	R16		
3	STB Le Havre (1)	R32		
4	ESSM Le Portel (1)			QF
5	Élan Béarnais Pau-Orthez (1)		R16	
6	BCM Gravelines-Dunkerque (1)		2R	
7	Nanterre 92 (1)		C	
(Belgium) BELGIUM (12)		(3)	(6)	(3)
1	Antwerp Giants (3)	QF	2R	RS
2	Mons-Hainaut (3)	R32	RS	2R
3	Excelsior Brussels (2)		RS	RS
4	Oostende (2)	R16	SF	
5	Spirou (1)		R16	
6	Limburg United (1)		RS	
(Italy) ITALY (5)		(2)	(0)	(3)
1	Dinamo Sassari (1)			R16
2	Reyer Venezia (1)			C
3	Felice Scandone (1)			RU
4	Varese (1)	RU		
5	Cantù (1)	R32		
(Hungary) HUNGARY (9)		(3)	(2)	(4)
1	Körmend (3)	RS	R16	R16
2	Alba Fehérvár (2)		2R	R16
3	Falco Szombathely (2)	RS		RS
4	Sopron (1)	RS		
5	Szolnoki Olaj (1)			2R
(Lithuania) LITHUANIA (7)		(3)	(2)	(2)
1	Juventus (2)	R16		QF
2	Šiauliai (2)	RS	RS	
3	Pieno Žvaigždės (1)	R32		
4	Prienai (1)		2R	
5	Nevėžis (1)			2R
(Poland) POLAND (4)		(3)	(1)	(0)
1	Turów Zgorzelec (1)	RS		
2	Zielona Góra (1)		R16	
3	Śląsk Wrocław (1)	R32		
4	Radom (1)	R32		
(Romania) ROMANIA (5)		(1)	(3)	(1)
1	U-BT Cluj-Napoca (1)		2R	QF
2	Energia Târgu Jiu (1)		R16	
3	Oradea (1)	R32		
4	Mureș (1)	R32		
(Russia) RUSSIA (4)		(1)	(1)	(2)
1	Enisey (2)	4th	QF	
2	Nizhny Novgorod (1)			QF
3	Avtodor Saratov (1)			RS
(Netherlands) NETHERLANDS (5)		(3)	(1)	(1)
1	Donar (3)	RS	2R	SF
2	Leiden (1)	RS		
3	Den Bosch (1)	RS		
(Bulgaria) BULGARIA (6)		(2)	(2)	(1)
1	Academic (3)	R32	2R	RS
2	Rilski Sportist (2)	RS	RS	
3	Balkan Botevgrad (1)			RS
(Portugal) PORTUGAL (5)		(2)	(2)	(1)
1	Benfica (3)	RS	2R	RS
2	FC Porto (2)	RS	RS	
(Germany) GERMANY (2)		(1)	(1)	(0)
1	Skyliners Frankfurt (1)	C		
2	Bonn (1)		SF	
(Finland) FINLAND (3)		(1)	(1)	(1)
1	Kataja (2)		R16	2R
2	KTP (1)	RS		
(Latvia) LATVIA (2)		(1)	(0)	(1)
1	Ventspils (2)	R16		R16
(Sweden) SWEDEN (2)		(2)	(0)	(0)
1	Södertälje Kings (1)	R32		
2	Borås (1)	R32		
(Belarus) BELARUS (2)		(1)	(0)	(1)
1	Tsmoki-Minsk (2)	R32		R16
(Bosnia and Herzegovina) BOSNIA AND HERZEGOVINA (1)		(0)	(0)	(1)
1	Bosna (1)			RS
(Ukraine) UKRAINE (1)		(1)	(0)	(1)
1	Khimik (2)	QF		RS
(Denmark) DENMARK (2)		(1)	(0)	(1)
1	Bakken Bears (2)	R32		SF
(Montenegro) MONTENEGRO (1)		(0)	(0)	(1)
1	Mornar (1)			QF
(Republic of Ireland) IRELAND (1)		(1)	(0)	(0)
1	Hibernia (1)	RS		
(Kazakhstan) KAZAKHSTAN (1)		(1)	(0)	(0)
1	Astana (1)	RS		
(Croatia) CROATIA (1)		(1)	(0)	(0)
1	Cibona (1)	QF		
(Slovenia) SLOVENIA (1)		(1)	(0)	(0)
1	Helios Suns (1)	RS		
(Georgia (country)) GEORGIA (1)		(0)	(0)	(1)
1	Dinamo Tbilisi (1)			RS

== See also ==
- Basketball Champions League records and statistics
