= Maksim Salash =

Belarusian basketball player

Monbus Obradoiro
- Position: Power forward / center
- League: Liga ACB

Personal information
- Born: 6 May 1996 (age 30) Minsk, Belarus
- Listed height: 6 ft 10 in (2.08 m)
- Listed weight: 220 lb (100 kg)

Career information
- Playing career: 2012–present

Career history
- 2012–2013: Tsmoki-Minsk II
- 2014–2015: CB Peñas Huesca
- 2015–2016: Club Ourense Baloncesto
- 2016–2017: Polfarmex Kutno
- 2017–2018: Tsmoki-Minsk
- 2018–2019: Kalev/Cramo
- 2019–2020: Tsmoki-Minsk
- 2020–2022: San Pablo Burgos
- 2022–2023: Nizhny Novgorod
- 2023–2025: JL Bourg
- 2025–2026: Maroussi
- 2026–present: Obradoiro

Career highlights
- Champions League champion (2021); FIBA Intercontinental Cup champion (2021); 2× Belarusian League champion (2018, 2020); Estonian League champion (2019); Belarusian National Cup champion (2020)

Maksim Salash (born 6 May 1996) is a Belarusian professional basketball player for Obradoiro of the Liga ACB.

== Professional career ==
=== Obradoiro (2026–present) ===
On November 19, 2026, Salash signed with Obradoiro of the Liga ACB.
