= 2014–15 EuroChallenge Group H =

Basketball tournament group stage

Group H of the 2014–15 EuroChallenge consisted of Uşak Sportif, BC Šiauliai, Enisey Krasnoyarsk and BC Tsmoki-Minsk. Play began on 4 November and ended on 16 December 2014.

== Teams ==
Draw seed	Team	City	Country	Last appearance	2013–14			Arena	Capacity
Draw seed	Team	City	Country	Last appearance	League	Pos.	Playoffs	Arena	Capacity
I	Tsmoki-Minsk	Minsk	Belarus	2013–14	Premier League	—N/a	C	Minsk Arena	15,000
II	Yenisey Krasnoyarsk	Krasnoyarsk	Russia	2011–12	VTB United League	5th	EF	Ivan Yarygin Sports Palace	4,100
III	Uşak Sportif	Uşak	Turkey	—N/a	TBL	7th	QF	Uşak Atatürk Sport Hall	1,650
IV	Šiauliai	Šiauliai	Lithuania	2008–09	LKL	6th	QF	Šiauliai Arena	5,700

== Standings ==
Pos	Team	Pld	W	L	PF	PA	PD	Pts	ENI	UŞA	ŠIA	TSM
1	(Russia) Enisey Krasnoyarsk (Q)	6	4	2	515	467	+48	10		86–68	95–79	87–82
2	(Turkey) Uşak Sportif (Q)	6	3	3	445	458	−13	9 (Note: Head-to-head: 2–0)	69–84		79–69	78–59
3	(Lithuania) Šiauliai	6	3	3	493	515	−22	9 (Note: Head-to-head: 0–2)	93–92	75–78		83–80
4	(Belarus) Tsmoki-Minsk	6	2	4	473	486	−13	8	76–71	85–73	91–94	

(Q) Qualify for Top 16
