= 2019–20 Belarusian Premier League (basketball) =

Belarusian Premier League
- Duration: 21 September 2019 – 7 September 2020
- Teams: 11

Finals
- Champions: Tsmoki-Minsk; 12th title

The 2019–20 Belarusian Premier League season was the 28th season of the top tier basketball league in Belarus. The season started on 21 September 2019, the season was suspended after 14 March 2020 because of the COVID-19 pandemic. A concluding Final Four tournament was organised in September 2020. Tsmoki-Minsk defended its title.

== Competition format ==
Ten teams joined the regular season, that consisted in a four-legged round-robin competition, later dividing all the teams into two groups. The six teams of the Group A and the two best of the Group B joined the playoffs.

== Teams ==
Location of teams in 2019–20 Belarusian Premier League

Team	Location
Borisfen	Mogilev
Brest	Brest
Grodno 93	Grodno
Impuls	Minsk
Masita-GOCOR	Gomel
Prinemanye	Grodno
RCOP-SDUSHOR	Minsk
RGUOR	Minsk
Rubon	Vitebsk
Tsmoki-Minsk	Minsk
Tsmoki-Minsk Reserves	Minsk
Tsmoki-Minsk Youth	Minsk

== Regular season ==
=== Standings ===
Pos	Team	Pld	W	L	PF	PA	PD	Pts	Qualification
1	Grodno 93	9	8	1	811	611	+200	17	Qualification to the Group A
2	Borisfen	9	8	1	941	599	+342	17	Qualification to the Group A
3	Tsmoki-Minsk Reserves	9	7	2	789	546	+243	16	Qualification to the Group A
4	Rubon	9	7	2	883	681	+202	16	Qualification to the Group A
5	Impuls	9	5	4	728	672	+56	14	Qualification to the Group A
6	Tsmoki-Minsk Youth	9	4	5	592	711	−119	13	Qualification to the Group A
7	Prinemanye	9	2	7	567	804	−237	11	Qualification to the Group B
8	Brest	9	2	7	638	822	−184	11	Qualification to the Group B
9	Masita-GOCOR	9	1	8	572	782	−210	10	Qualification to the Group B
10	RCOP-SDUSHOR	9	1	8	592	875	−283	10	Qualification to the Group B

Source: BBF.by

=== Results ===
Home \ Away	BOR	BRE	GRO	IMP	GOC	PRI	RCO	RUB	TMR	TMY
Borisfen	—	—	70–71	—	—	127–45	—	107–89	—	131–49
Brest	73–109	—	—	69–90	98–81	—	91–75	—	69–101	—
Grodno 93	—	121–55	—	84–72	107–80	—	116–69	—	78–62	—
Impuls	65–89	—	—	—	77–62	—	—	94–110	58–78	94–69
Masita-GOCOR	52–107	—	—	—	—	70–82	—	41–80	—	63–85
Prinemanye	—	82–79	57–79	51–91	—	—	67–78	—	41–93	—
RCOP-SDUSHOR	73–109	—	—	60–87	61–89	—	—	—	46–95	50–90
Rubon	—	106–57	90–77	—	—	114–70	131–80	—	—	—
Tsmoki-Minsk Reserves	82–92	—	—	—	85–34	—	—	95–75	—	98–53
Tsmoki-Minsk Youth	—	57–47	56–78	—	—	73–62	—	60–88	—	—

Source: BBF.by
Legend: Blue = home team win; Red = away team win.

== Second stage Group A ==
=== Standings ===
Pos	Team	Pld	W	L	PF	PA	PD	Pts
1	Borisfen	23	20	3	2238	1618	+620	43
2	Grodno 93	25	18	7	2145	1825	+320	43
3	Rubon	25	16	9	2325	2043	+282	41
4	Tsmoki-Minsk Reserves	24	16	8	1957	1613	+344	40
5	Impuls	25	10	15	1923	1979	−56	35
6	Tsmoki-Minsk Youth	24	5	19	1451	2046	−595	29

Updated to match(es) played on 14 March 2020. Source: BBF.by

=== Results ===
Home \ Away	BOR	GRO	IMP	RUB	TMR	TMY	BOR	GRO	IMP	RUB	TMR	TMY
Borisfen	—	87–82	98–51	103–79	86–81	107–54	—	96–77	78–74	103–74		
Grodno 93	96–100	—	80–71	94–102	90–89	92–50		—				97–70
Impuls	48–95	79–56	—	85–109	70–75	92–75	101–99	64–83	—			
Rubon	97–87	92–95	86–82	—	79–82	106–54		77–110	89–83	—	78–99	103–56
Tsmoki-Minsk Reserves	53–57	83–71	77–69	81–83	—	74–58		59–70	80–84	81–71	—	
Tsmoki-Minsk Youth	52–101	50–85	69–85	67–117	45–78	—		45–65	58–57		56–76	—

Updated to match(es) played on 14 March 2020. Source: BBF.by
Legend: Blue = home team win; Red = away team win.

== Second stage Group B ==
=== Standings ===
Pos	Team	Pld	W	L	PF	PA	PD	Pts
1	Masita-GOCOR	23	12	11	1839	1839	0	35
2	Brest	22	10	12	1711	1851	−140	32
3	Prinemanye	21	9	12	1484	1711	−227	30
4	RCOP-SDUSHOR	22	6	16	1590	1957	−367	28
5	RGUOR (Note: RGUOR started to play in the second stage. 10 points were added to them, equal to 10 losses in the first stage.)	14	2	12	901	1091	−190	26

Updated to match(es) played on 14 March 2020. Source: BBF.by

=== Results Group B ===
Home \ Away	BRE	GOC	PRI	RCO	RGU	BRE	GOC	PRI	RCO	RGU
Brest	—	102–99	100–76	91–67	82–79	—		75–68		96–65
Masita-GOCOR	97–66	—	78–74	113–101	85–54	89–83	—		98–75	69–64
Prinemanye	93–78	85–99	—	76–70	73–44		79–67	—	84–99	70–69
RCOP-SDUSHOR	84–80	77–103	72–75	—	83–50	72–69	59–101		—	58–68
RGUOR	57–63	54–91	56–74	74–83	—	83–88	84–78			—

Updated to match(es) played on 14 March 2020. Source: BBF.by
Legend: Blue = home team win; Red = away team win.

== Final Four ==
To conclude the season, a final four round-robin tournament was held in September 2020. Tsmoki-Minsk, Rubon, Borisfen and BK Grodno-93 played one game against each other. Tsmoki-Minsk defended its title, finishing with an unbeaten 3–0 record.

== Belarusian clubs in European competitions ==
Borisfen made its debut in European competitions. However, it was eliminated in the qualifying round of the FIBA Europe Cup.

Team	Competition	Progress
Tsmoki-Minsk	Champions League	First qualifying round
Tsmoki-Minsk	FIBA Europe Cup	Quarterfinals
Borisfen	FIBA Europe Cup	Qualifying round
