= 2016–17 Belarusian Premier League (basketball) =

Belarusian Premier League
- Teams: 10

Regular season
- Top seed: Tsmoki Minsk

Finals
- Champions: Tsmoki Minsk
- Runners-up: Grodno 93

The 2016–17 Belarusian Premier League season is the 25th season of the top tier basketball league in Belarus.

== Regular season ==
Pos	Team	Pld	W	L	PF	PA	PD	Pts	Qualification
1	Borisfen	32	29	3	2876	2241	+635	61	Qualification to the playoffs
2	Grodno 93	32	27	5	2994	2038	+956	59	Qualification to the playoffs
3	Rubon	32	21	11	2700	2372	+328	53	Qualification to the playoffs
4	Tsmoki-Minsk II	32	20	12	2596	2259	+337	52	Qualification to the playoffs
5	Impuls	32	18	14	2387	2471	−84	50	Qualification to the playoffs
6	BGEU Grand Point	32	13	19	2440	2603	−163	45	Qualification to the playoffs
7	Prinemanye	32	8	24	2146	2422	−276	40	
8	Brest	32	4	28	2090	2833	−743	36	
9	Sozh Gomel	32	4	28	1862	2852	−990	36	

Source: BBF.by

== Playoffs ==
Quarter-finals
Rubon	75	63	81
Tsmoki Minsk II	70	64	77
Borisfen	72	66
BGEU Grand Point	61	61
Grodno 93	87	86
Impuls	69	77

Semi-finals
Tsmoki Minsk	116	123	90
Rubon	75	68	60
Borisfen	62	79	89	62	83
Grodno 93	65	74	85	74	98

Final
Tsmoki Minsk	107	101	86
Grodno 93	68	85	79

Third place
Borisfen	3
Rubon	1

=== 5th position bracket ===
Semi-finals
Tsmoki Minsk II	3
Prinemanye	1

Final
Impuls	3
BGEU Grand Point	1
Third place
Tsmoki Minsk II	3
Impuls	2

Seventh place
BGEU Grand Point	1
Prinemanye	3

=== 9th position playoff ===
Ninth place
Brest	2
Sozh Gomel	1
