= 2001–02 North European Basketball League =

North European Basketball League
- Season: 2001-2002
- Teams: 31

2000–01 NEBL was the third complete season of the North European Basketball League. There were 31 teams, from 19 countries participating in the 2001–02 season's tournament. Apart from clubs from Northern, Central and Eastern Europe, clubs from Southern Europe (Bulgaria, Macedonia, Romania, Serbia), Israel and Turkey participated for the first time in this competition.

Lietuvos rytas won the tournament by defeating Ural Great in the final.

== Regular season ==
=== Group A ===
	Team	Pld	W	L	PF	PA	Pts
1.	(Latvia) Ventspils	8	7	1	717	631	15
2.	(Belgium) Go Pass Pepinster	8	5	3	563	527	13
3.	(England) Pertemps Bullets	8	5	3	693	678	13
4.	(Ukraine) Kyiv	8	5	3	685	664	13
5.	(Denmark) Magic Great Danes	8	4	4	595	589	12
6.	(Russia) Samara	8	4	4	611	586	12
7.	(Lithuania) Šiauliai	8	3	5	447	480	11
8.	(Germany) Mitteldeutscher	8	2	6	568	649	10
9.	(Sweden) 08 Stockholm Human Rights	8	1	7	664	757	9

Source: ural-great.ru

Results
	(Sweden) SHR	(Germany) MIT	(Lithuania) ŠIA	(Russia) SAM	(Denmark) MGD	(Ukraine) KYI	(England) BUL	(Belgium) PEP
(Latvia) Ventspils	102-84	80-73	92-77	79-83	76-61	104-89	91-86	93-78
(Belgium) Go Pass Pepinster	79-80	68-57	75-81	20-0	74-63	89-83	80-70	
(England) Pertemps Bullets	99-96	80-64	88-80	94-87	88-97	88-83		
(Ukraine) Kyiv	104-101	74-65	81-71	91-79	80-67			
(Denmark) Magic Great Danes	88-74	82-62	59-65	78-70				
(Russia) Samara	92-79	116-75	84-70					
(Lithuania) Šiauliai	103-75	74-82						
(Germany) Mitteldeutscher	90-75							

=== Group B ===
	Team	Pld	W	L	PF	PA	Pts
1.	(Poland) Polonia Warbud	8	7	1	645	587	15
2.	(Germany) RheinEnergy Köln	8	6	2	646	590	14
3.	(Ukraine) Odesa	8	5	3	668	621	13
4.	(Latvia) Skonto	8	5	3	704	693	13
5.	(Estonia) Kalev	8	4	4	660	671	12
6.	(Finland) Honka Playboys	8	3	5	630	624	11
7.	(Germany) XRAYS S.Oliver	8	3	5	663	663	11
8.	(Lithuania) Alita	8	2	6	602	640	10
9.	(Belarus) Grodno-93	8	1	7	539	670	9

Source: ural-great.ru

Results
	(Belarus) GRO	(Lithuania) ALI	(Germany) OLI	(Finland) HON	(Estonia) KAL	(Latvia) SKO	(Ukraine) ODE	(Germany) KÖL
(Poland) Polonia Warbud	77-70	82-67	80-77	84-78	89-66	73-85	83-70	77-74
(Germany) RheinEnergy Köln	88-70	87-84	86-75	72-69	79-80	90-85	70-50	
(Ukraine) Odesa	106-70	101-73	77-79	79-70	85-83	100-93		
(Latvia) Skonto	81-67	70-93	109-100	86-82	95-88			
(Estonia) Kalev	85-71	75-72	100-87	83-93				
(Finland) Honka Playboys	78-73	70-73	90-74					
(Germany) XRAYS S.Oliver	88-46	83-73						
(Lithuania) Alita	67-72							

Consolation games:

XRAYS S.Oliver-Šiauliai 83-77; Stockholm Human Rights-Kalev 96-103; Samara-Alita 97-75;Grodno-93-Mitteldeutscher 67-74; Honka Playboys-Great Danes 93-89;

Alita-Mitteldeutscher 79-61; Kalev-Samara 95-78; Šiauliai-Honka Playboys 73-85; Great Danes-XRAYS S.Oliver 93-104;Stockholm Human Rights-Grodno-93 59-70;

Honka Playboys-Mitteldeutscher 100-90; Kalev-Great Danes 77-74; Šiauliai-Alita 88-63;Grodno-93-Samara 82-68;Stockholm Human Rights-XRAYS S.Oliver 91-94;

Kalev-Šiauliai 72-80; Samara-Honka Playboys 91-90; Great Danes-Grodno-93 117-111; Alita-Stockholm Human Rights 100-75; Mitteldeutscher-XRAYS S.Oliver 86-83;

Mitteldeutscher-Kalev 105-98;Honka Playboys-Stockholm Human Rights 95-101; XRAYS S.Oliver-Samara 80-79;Great Danes-Alita 79-76; Grodno-93-Šiauliai 75-85;

=== Group S ===
	Team	Pld	W	L	PF	PA	Pts
1.	(North Macedonia) Feršped Rabotnički	8	6	2	622	604	14
2.	(Federal Republic of Yugoslavia) NIS Vojvodina	8	6	2	658	600	14
3.	(Bulgaria) Yambolgaz	8	5	3	698	663	13
4.	(Turkey) Fenerbahçe	8	5	3	616	587	13
5.	(Israel) Hapoel Tel Aviv	8	5	3	646	568	13
6.	(Bulgaria) Levski	8	4	4	677	710	12
7.	(North Macedonia) Kumanovo	8	2	6	525	528	10
8.	(Bulgaria) Lukoil Academic	8	2	6	524	567	10
9.	(Romania) West Petrom Arad	8	0	8	595	734	8

Source: ural-great.ru

Results
	(Romania) WPA	(Bulgaria) LUK	(North Macedonia) KUM	(Bulgaria) LEV	(Israel) HTA	(Turkey) FEN	(Bulgaria) YAM	(Federal Republic of Yugoslavia) VOJ
(North Macedonia) Feršped Rabotnički	82-73	80-72	82-72	82-71	58-78	85-80	73-82	80-76
(Federal Republic of Yugoslavia) NIS Vojvodina	110-80	69-64	69-65	70-73	80-72	90-86	94-80	
(Bulgaria) Yambolgaz	82-78	82-89	84-67	105-111	92-80	91-71		
(Turkey) Fenerbahçe	85-60	73-66	77-71	78-59	66-65			
(Israel) Hapoel Tel Aviv	82-56	87-73	81-60	101-83				
(Bulgaria) Levski	112-105	93-76	75-93					
(North Macedonia) Kumanovo	97-60	87-74						
(Bulgaria) Lukoil Academic	84-83							

== Second round ==
Key to colors
Top team in each group advance to Final Four.

Group C

Pos	Team	Pld	W	L	PF	PA	PD	Qualification	(Russia) URA	(Ukraine) KYI	(Federal Republic of Yugoslavia) VOJ	(Germany) KÖL
1	(Russia) Ural Great	6	4	2	477	446	+31	Advance to Final Four	—	108–100	111–83	20–0
2	(Ukraine) Kyiv	6	3	3	542	510	+32		81–95	—	110–77	73–74
3	(Federal Republic of Yugoslavia) NIS Vojvodina	6	3	3	496	542	−46		88–78	81–95	—	87–81
4	(Germany) RheinEnergy Köln	6	2	4	401	418	−17		94–75	75–83	77–80	—

Source: sport.niv.ru

Group D

	Team	Pld	W	L	PF	PA	Diff	Pts
1.	(Lithuania) Lietuvos rytas	6	5	1	571	496	+75	11
2.	(Latvia) Skonto	6	4	2	524	510	+14	10
3.	(Belgium) Go Pass Pepinster	6	2	4	506	511	–5	8
4.	(North Macedonia) Feršped Rabotnički	6	1	5	448	532	–84	7

Group E

	Team	Pld	W	L	PF	PA	Diff	Pts
1.	(Latvia) Ventspils	6	5	1	566	511	+55	11
2.	(Russia) CSKA Moscow	6	3	3	562	531	+31	9
3.	(Ukraine) Odesa	6	2	4	479	525	–46	8
4.	(Turkey) Fenerbahçe	6	2	4	526	566	–40	8

Group F

	Team	Pld	W	L	PF	PA	Diff	Pts
1.	(Poland) Polonia Warbud	6	4	2	512	480	+32	10
2.	(Bulgaria) Yambolgaz	6	3	3	521	499	+22	9
3.	(England) Kinder London Towers	6	3	3	551	558	–7	9
4.	(England) Pertemps Bullets	6	2	4	525	572	–47	8

Source: ural-great.ru

== Final Four ==
Semi-finals
(Russia) Ural Great	107
(Poland) Polonia Warbud	82
(Lithuania) Lietuvos rytas	87
(Latvia) Ventspils	75

Final
(Russia) Ural Great	74
(Lithuania) Lietuvos rytas	79
Third place
(Poland) Polonia Warbud	63
(Latvia) Ventspils	81

Source: ural-great.ru
