= 2018–19 Premier League (disambiguation) =

The 2018–19 Premier League was a professional association football league season in England.

2018–19 Premier League may also refer to:

== Association football ==
- 2018–19 Armenian Premier League
- 2018–19 Azerbaijan Premier League
- 2018–19 Premier League of Belize
- 2018–19 Premier League of Bosnia and Herzegovina
- 2018–19 Egyptian Premier League
- 2018–19 Hong Kong Premier League
- 2018–19 Iraqi Premier League
- 2018–19 Israeli Premier League
- 2018–19 Kuwaiti Premier League
- 2018–19 Lebanese Premier League
- 2018–19 Maltese Premier League
- 2018–19 National Premier League (Jamaica)
- 2018–19 Russian Premier League
- 2018–19 Syrian Premier League
- 2018–19 Tanzanian Premier League
- 2018–19 Ukrainian Premier League
- 2018–19 Welsh Premier League

== Basketball ==
- 2018–19 Belarusian Premier League
- 2018–19 Israeli Basketball Premier League

== Cricket ==
- 2018–19 Bangladesh Premier League
- 2019 Indian Premier League
- 2018–19 Premier League Tournament (Sri Lanka)

== See also ==
- 2018–19 Premier League International Cup
