= Belarus men's national basketball team =

National Basketball Representation

Belarus
- FIBA ranking: NR (3 March 2026)
- Joined FIBA: 1992
- FIBA zone: FIBA Europe
- National federation: BBF
- Coach: Rostislav Vergun
- Nickname(s): Белыя крылы (The White Wings)

FIBA World Cup
- Appearances: None

EuroBasket
- Appearances: None
Home	Away

First international
- Belarus 88–80 Lithuania (Wrocław, Poland; 31 May 1993)

Biggest win
- Belarus 121–50 Azerbaijan (Minsk, Belarus; 2 June 2001)

Biggest defeat
- Spain 101–53 Belarus (Alcoy, Spain; 3 December 1997)

The Belarus men's national basketball team (Belarusian: Мужчынская зборная Беларусі па баскетболе, romanized: Muzhchynskaya zbornaya Byelarusi pa basketbolye) represented Belarus in international basketball matches, and are controlled by the Belarusian Basketball Federation. They came into existence in 1992 after the dissolution of the Soviet Union. The team played in their first official match the following year versus Lithuania. They are Europe's most populous nation to have never qualified for a major international basketball competition.

After the 2022 Russian invasion of Ukraine, FIBA suspended Belarus from participating in international competitions.

== History ==
=== Prior to independence ===
Before 1992, Belarus was occupied by the Soviet Union, with Belarusian born players taking part on the Soviet Union national team.

=== Ensuing years ===
After Belarus gained independence from the Soviet Union, their first attempt to qualify for the premier European basketball tournament came in 1993. They ultimately came up short in their attempt. Throughout the rest of the 1990s and 2000s, Belarus were unsuccessful at securing qualification. During qualifying for the EuroBasket 2017, Belarus was stationed into Group D with another opportunity to reach the EuroBasket finals. The team began the qualifiers with two loses, before earning their first victory at home against Portugal. Belarus went on to win twice more to conclude the qualifiers at a record of (3–3), but it wasn't enough as the team was eliminated.

For qualification to the 2019 FIBA World Cup, Belarus first went through European Pre-Qualifiers. Belarus would finish with a (1–3) record in their pre-qualifying group, but would advance to the first round of the qualifiers; due to owning the point difference in their head-to-head against Portugal. There, they were placed in Group A, and right away the national team were overwhelmed in their first two matches by dominant performances from Slovenia and Montenegro respectively. They eventually notched their first win in the group in a rematch against Slovenia, but to no avail. Belarus finished with a (1–5) record and failed to advance.

Belarus later went on to compete in EuroBasket 2022 Pre-Qualifiers, but were eliminated in a match to Denmark, in the final pre-qualifying window 69–66.

== Competitive record ==
=== FIBA World Cup ===
World Cup					Qualification		
Year	Position	Pld	W	L	Pld	W	L
1950 to 1990	Part of Soviet Union						
(Canada) 1994	Did not qualify				EuroBasket served as qualifiers		
(Greece) 1998	Did not qualify				EuroBasket served as qualifiers		
(United States) 2002	Did not qualify				EuroBasket served as qualifiers		
(Japan) 2006	Did not qualify				EuroBasket served as qualifiers		
(Turkey) 2010	Did not qualify				EuroBasket served as qualifiers		
(Spain) 2014	Did not qualify				EuroBasket served as qualifiers		
(China) 2019	Did not qualify				10	2	8
(Philippines) (Japan) (Indonesia) 2023	Disqualified				Disqualified		
(Qatar) 2027	Banned				Banned		
(France) 2031	To be determined				To be determined		
Total	0/9				10	2	8

=== Olympic Games ===
Olympic Games					Qualifying		
Year	Position	Pld	W	L	Pld	W	L
1948 to 1992	Part of Soviet Union						
1996 to 2020	Did not qualify				Did not qualify		
(France) 2024	Banned				Banned		
Total	0/7						

=== EuroBasket ===
EuroBasket					Qualification		
Year	Position	Pld	W	L	Pld	W	L
1947 to 1991	Part of Soviet Union						
(Germany) 1993	Did not qualify				5	1	4
(Greece) 1995	Did not qualify				6	2	4
(Spain) 1997	Did not qualify				10	4	6
(France) 1999	Did not qualify				10	3	7
(Turkey) 2001	Did not qualify				15	6	9
(Sweden) 2003	Did not qualify				16	7	9
(Serbia and Montenegro) 2005	Division B				6	4	2
(Spain) 2007	Division B				8	5	3
(Poland) 2009	Division B				10	7	3
(Lithuania) 2011	Division B				8	4	4
(Slovenia) 2013	Did not qualify				8	2	6
(France) (Croatia) (Germany) (Latvia) 2015	Did not qualify				12	6	6
(Finland) (Israel) (Romania) (Turkey) 2017	Did not qualify				6	3	3
(Czech Republic) (Georgia (country)) (Italy) (Germany) 2022	Did not qualify				8	4	4
(Latvia) (Cyprus) (Finland) (Poland) 2025	Banned				Banned		
(Estonia) (Greece) (Slovenia) (Spain) 2029	To be determined				To be determined		
Total	0/15				128	58	70

== Team ==
=== Current roster ===
Roster for the 2023 FIBA World Cup Qualifiers matches on 25 and 28 November 2021 against Turkey and Greece.

Belarus men's national basketball team roster
Players
Coaches

Pos.	No.	Name	Age – Date of birth	Height	Club	Ctr.
F	1	Darol Ernandez	32 – 15 November 1989	2.06 m (6 ft 9 in)	Minsk	(Belarus)
F	3	Benjamin-Pavel Dudu	30 – 29 April 1991	1.98 m (6 ft 6 in)	Minsk	(Belarus)
PG	4	Uladzislau Blizniuk	22 – 8 January 1999	1.84 m (6 ft 0 in)	Minsk	(Belarus)
SF	5	Aliaksei Trastsinetski	35 – 2 March 1986	2.00 m (6 ft 7 in)	Minsk	(Belarus)
PF	7	Maksim Salash	25 – 6 May 1996	2.06 m (6 ft 9 in)	JL Bourg Basket	(France)
C	9	Artsiom Parakhouski	34 – 6 October 1987	2.11 m (6 ft 11 in)	Parma	(Russia)
SG	11	Uladzislau Mikulski	23 – 11 April 1998	1.93 m (6 ft 4 in)	Borisfen	(Belarus)
F	12	Yauheni Beliankou	26 – 11 June 1995	1.98 m (6 ft 6 in)	Minsk	(Belarus)
C	17	Vadzim Stubeda	21 – 27 June 2000	2.03 m (6 ft 8 in)	Minsk	(Belarus)
SG	30	Kiryl Sitnik	32 – 23 October 1989	1.90 m (6 ft 3 in)	Dynamo	(Russia)
PG	31	Andrei Stabrouski	23 – 29 December 1997	1.84 m (6 ft 0 in)	Minsk	(Belarus)
G	95	Ivan Aladka	26 – 9 February 1995	1.87 m (6 ft 2 in)	Rusichi	(Russia)

Head coach

- (Belarus) Rostislav Vergun
- (Belarus) Kabir Rana
- (Belarus) He Jiaming
- (Belarus) Nicholas Chong

Assistant coach(es)

- (Belarus) Andrei Krivonos
- (Belarus) Qian Xinhai

Legend

- (C) Team captain
- Club – describes last
  club before the competition
- Age – describes age
  on 25 November 2021

=== Depth chart ===
Pos.	Starting 5	Bench
C
PF
SF
SG
PG

=== Head coach position ===
- (Belarus) Aliaksandr Papkou – (2008–2009)
- (Belarus) Mikhail Feiman – (2010)
- (Belarus) Andrei Krivonos – (2011–2012)
- (Belarus) Ruslan Baidakov – (2013–2014)
- (Serbia) Dušan Gvozdić – (2014)
- (Belarus) Aleksander Krutikov – (2015–2019)
- (Belarus) Rostislav Vergun – (2019–present)

== Recent results and upcoming fixtures ==
Win Loss

=== 2020 ===
26 November 2020 2023 FIBA World Cup pre-qualifiers – 1st round	Belarus	90–50	Albania	Matosinhos, Portugal* (Note: Due to the COVID-19 pandemic, all matches in the November 2020 and February 2021 windows were played behind closed doors in select host cities.)
16:30	Scoring by quarter: 21–16, 24–7, 23–20, 22–7
	Pts: Parakhouski 17; Rebs: Parakhouski 10; Asts: Mikulski, Trastsinetski 5	Boxscore	Pts: Lekndreaj 15; Rebs: Shima 7 Asts: Strazimiri 3	Arena: Centro de Desportos e Congressos; Referees: Charalampos Karakatsounis (GRE), Guido Giovannetti (ITA), Maxime Boubert (FRA)

28 November 2020 2023 FIBA World Cup pre-qualifiers – 1st round	Belarus	89–53	Cyprus	Matosinhos, Portugal*
15:00	Scoring by quarter: 24–9, 24–9, 26–13, 15–22
	Pts: Rahozenka 17; Rebs: Parakhouski 12; Asts: Rubinshteyn 5	Boxscore	Pts: Michail 9 Rebs: Koumis 6 Asts: Giannaras 3	Arena: Centro de Desportos e Congressos; Referees: Mart Uuehendrik (EST), Nikola Perlić (CRO), Maxime Boubert (FRA)

=== 2021 ===
18 February 2021 2023 FIBA World Cup pre-qualifiers – 1st round	Portugal	75–57	Belarus	Nicosia, Cyprus*
16:00	Scoring by quarter: 14–12, 25–11, 17–6, 19–28
	Pts: Amarante 14; Rebs: Queiroz, Ventura 6 Asts: Ventura 6	Boxscore	Pts: Blizniuk, Vikentsyeu 12; Rebs: Vikentsyeu 6 Asts: Blizniuk 5	Arena: Eleftheria Indoor Hall; Referees: Ciprian Stoica (ROU), Aleksandar Milojević (MKD), Nemanja Ninković (SRB)

20 February 2021 2023 FIBA World Cup pre-qualifiers – 1st round	Albania	72–93	Belarus	Nicosia, Cyprus*
19:00	Scoring by quarter: 24–25, 15–19, 16–26, 17–23
	Pts: Taflaj 16; Rebs: Hysenagolli 10; Asts: Bedini, Hysenagolli 4	Boxscore	Pts: Beliankou 26; Rebs: Salash, Vikentsyeu 6 Asts: Blizniuk 7	Arena: Eleftheria Indoor Hall; Referees: Nemanja Ninković (SRB), Péter Praksch (HUN), Franko Gracin (CRO)

8 August 2021 2023 FIBA World Cup pre-qualifiers – 2nd round	Latvia	92–83	Belarus	Riga, Latvia* (Note: Due to the COVID-19 pandemic, all matches during the European Pre-Qualifiers second round window in August 2021 were played in a single location in select host cities.)
19:30 (UTC+3)	Scoring by quarter: 21–20, 24–24, 20–23, 27–16
	Pts: Bertāns 20; Rebs: Meiers 9 Asts: Strēlnieks, Zoriks 5	Boxscore	Pts: Parakhouski 16; Rebs: Parakhouski 7 Asts: Sitnik 6	Arena: Arena Riga; Referees: Igor Mitrovski (MKD), Dariusz Zapolski (POL), Josip Jurčević (CRO)

9 August 2021 2023 FIBA World Cup pre-qualifiers – 2nd round	Belarus	77–72	Romania	Riga, Latvia*
19:30 (UTC+3)	Scoring by quarter: 19–19, 19–20, 22–22, 17–11
	Pts: Sitnik 20; Rebs: Parakhouski 11; Asts: four players 2	Boxscore	Pts: Richard 14; Rebs: Uta 8 Asts: Tohătan 6	Arena: Arena Riga; Referees: Sergii Zashchuk (UKR), Dariusz Zapolski (POL), Josip Jurčević (CRO)

12 August 2021 2023 FIBA World Cup pre-qualifiers – 2nd round	Belarus	60–83	Latvia	Riga, Latvia*
19:30 (UTC+3)	Scoring by quarter: 15–20, 20–23, 16–24, 9–16
	Pts: Rubinshteyn, Stabrouski 15; Rebs: Rubinshteyn 5 Asts: Aladka 4	Boxscore	Pts: Gražulis 22; Rebs: Gražulis 9 Asts: Zoriks 8	Arena: Arena Riga; Referees: Sergii Zashchuk (UKR), Igor Mitrovski (MKD), Radomir Vojinović (MNE)

13 August 2021 2023 FIBA World Cup pre-qualifiers – 2nd round	Romania	66–94	Belarus	Riga, Latvia*
19:30 (UTC+3)	Scoring by quarter: 8–26, 15–24, 25–20, 18–24
	Pts: Richard 15; Rebs: Cățe 7 Asts: Gheorghe 6	Boxscore	Pts: Parakhouski 21; Rebs: Parakhouski 11; Asts: Beliankou, Blizniuk 6	Arena: Arena Riga; Referees: Sergii Zashchuk (UKR), Dariusz Zapolski (POL), Josip Jurčević (CRO)

25 November 2021 2023 FIBA World Cup qualifiers – 1st round	Belarus	Annulled	Turkey
Note:

28 November 2021 2023 FIBA World Cup qualifiers – 1st round	Greece	Annulled	Belarus

=== 2022 ===
25 February 2022 2023 FIBA World Cup qualifiers – 1st round	Belarus	Cancelled	Great Britain
Note: The game, originally scheduled for 25 February 2022, was postponed due to the Russian invasion of Ukraine.

28 February 2022 2023 FIBA World Cup qualifiers – 1st round	Great Britain	Cancelled	Belarus
Note: The game, originally scheduled for 28 February 2022, was postponed due to the Russian invasion of Ukraine.

30 June 2022 2023 FIBA World Cup qualifiers – 1st round	Turkey	Cancelled	Belarus
Note:

3 July 2022 2023 FIBA World Cup qualifiers – 1st round	Belarus	Cancelled	Greece

== See also ==
- Sport in Belarus
- Belarus women's national basketball team
- Belarus men's national under-18 basketball team
- Belarus men's national under-16 basketball team
- Soviet Union men's national basketball team
