= Belarusian Basketball Federation =

Sports governing body in Belarus

- Sport: Basketball
- Jurisdiction: Belarus
- Abbreviation: BBF
- Founded: 1992
- Affiliation: FIBA
- Regional affiliation: FIBA Europe
- Headquarters: Minsk
- President: Maksim Ryzhenkov

Official website
- belarus.basketball
- (Belarus)

Belarusian Basketball Federation (Belarusian: Беларуская федэрацыя баскетбола), also known as BBF, is a national governing body of basketball in Belarus.

After the 2022 Russian invasion of Ukraine, FIBA suspended Belarus from participating in basketball and 3x3 basketball competitions. FIBA also banned Belarus from hosting any competitions. Also, FIBA Europe mandated that no official basketball competitions are to be held in Belarus, while the teams of the Belarusian Basketball Federation are withdrawn from national team competitions and from the club competition season 2022-23.

== See also ==
- Belarus national basketball team
- Belarus women's national basketball team
- Belarusian Premier League
