= 2011 King Abdullah Cup =

Basketball tournament edition

The 2011 King's Cup, was the eighth edition of the King Abdullah II International Cup basketball tournament which was held in Jordan from 21–27 July 2011.

== Preliminary round ==
=== Group A ===
Team	Pld	W	L	PF	PA	PD	Pts
Jordan	3	3	0	246	186	+60	6
Lebanon	3	2	1	224	217	+7	5
Algeria	3	1	2	212	207	+5	4
Kuwait	3	0	3	186	258	–72	3

21 July
15:00

Jordan	80–61	Lebanon
Scoring by quarter: 21–25, 18–2, 20–12, 21–22

Prince Hamzah Hall, Amman

21 July
18:00

Algeria	84–52	Kuwait

Prince Hamzah Hall, Amman

22 July
15:00

Jordan	76–65	Algeria
Scoring by quarter: 26–16, 12–19, 17–17, 21–13

Prince Hamzah Hall, Amman

22 July
17:00

Lebanon	84–74	Kuwait
Scoring by quarter: 14–9, 26–18, 24–24, 20–23

Prince Hamzah Hall, Amman

23 July
15:00

Jordan	90–60	Kuwait
Scoring by quarter: 17–13, 22–18, 35–13, 16–16

Prince Hamzah Hall, Amman

24 July
17:00

Lebanon	79–63	Algeria
Scoring by quarter: 21–14, 21–20, 20–11, 17–18

Prince Hamzah Hall, Amman

=== Group B ===
Team	Pld	W	L	PF	PA	PD	Pts
Tunisia	3	3	0	218	159	+59	6
Egypt	3	2	1	260	260	0	5
Belarus	3	1	2	230	212	+18	4
Palestine	3	0	3	174	251	–77	3

21 July
12:00

Egypt	94–81	Palestine
Scoring by quarter: 18–14, 19–18, 31–23, 26–26

Prince Hamzah Hall, Amman

22 July
13:00

Belarus	49–63	Tunisia
Scoring by quarter: 20–15, 8–13, 8–23, 13–12

Prince Hamzah Hall, Amman

23 July
13:00

Belarus	88–51	Palestine
Scoring by quarter: 18–10, 23–20, 25–10, 22–11

Prince Hamzah Hall, Amman

23 July
17:00

Egypt	68–86	Tunisia

Prince Hamzah Hall, Amman

24 July
15:00

Egypt	98–93	Belarus
Scoring by quarter: 22–16, 36–23, 26–26, 14–28

Prince Hamzah Hall, Amman

24 July
17:00

Tunisia	69–42	Palestine
Scoring by quarter: 14–15, 11–5, 26–16, 18–6

Prince Hamzah Hall, Amman

== Final round ==
Quarterfinals
25 July
Jordan	93
Palestine	67
25 July
Egypt	81
Algeria	70
25 July
Tunisia	87
Kuwait	37
25 July
Lebanon	63
Belarus	70

Semifinals
26 July
Jordan	80
Egypt	71
26 July
Tunisia	66
Belarus	58

Final
27 July
Jordan	77
Tunisia	59
3rd place
27 July
Egypt	76
Belarus	73

=== Quarterfinals ===
July 25
11:00

Egypt	81–70	Algeria

Prince Hamzah Hall, Amman

25 July
13:00

Tunisia	87–37	Kuwait
Scoring by quarter: 26–12, 20–11, 19–7, 22–7

Prince Hamzah Hall, Amman

25 July
15:00

Jordan	93–67	Palestine
Scoring by quarter: 24–15, 26–17, 25–16, 18–19

Prince Hamzah Hall, Amman

25 July
17:00

Lebanon	63–70	Belarus
Scoring by quarter: 21–27, 6–16, 19–12, 17–15

Prince Hamzah Hall, Amman

=== Semifinals ===
26 July
15:00

Egypt	71–80	Jordan
Scoring by quarter: 24–24, 17–18, 17–24, 13–14

Prince Hamzah Hall, Amman

26 July
17:00

Tunisia	66–58	Belarus
Scoring by quarter: 9–13, 8–13, 28–14, 21–18

Prince Hamzah Hall, Amman

=== 3rd Place ===
27 July
14:00

Egypt	76–73	Belarus
Scoring by quarter: 14–22, 23–16, 19–13, 20–22

Prince Hamzah Hall, Amman

=== Final ===
27 July
16:00

Jordan	77–59	Tunisia
Scoring by quarter: 15–12, 19–14, 20–20, 23–13

Prince Hamzah Hall, Amman

== Awards ==
2011 King Abdullah Cup

Jordan
