= Trae Golden =

American basketball player (born 1991)

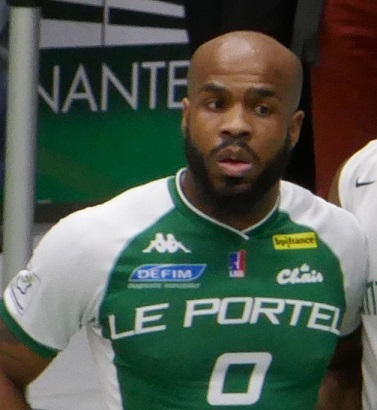
- Golden with Le Portel in 2018

Free agent
- Position: Point guard

Personal information
- Born: October 5, 1991 (age 35) Atlanta, Georgia, U.S.
- Listed height: 6 ft 3 in (1.91 m)
- Listed weight: 204 lb (93 kg)

Career information
- High school: McEachern (Powder Springs, Georgia)
- College: Tennessee (2010–2013); Georgia Tech (2013–2014)
- NBA draft: 2014: undrafted
- Playing career: 2014–present

Career history
- 2014: Lapuan Korikobrat
- 2015–2016: ETHA Engomis
- 2016–2017: Pallacanestro Chieti
- 2017–2018: Le Portel
- 2018–2019: Avtodor
- 2019–2020: Bahçeşehir Koleji
- 2020–2022: Fujian Sturgeons
- 2022–2023: Beijing Royal Fighters
- 2023–2024: Sichuan Blue Whales
- 2024: Al-Ahly Ly
- 2024: Fujian Sturgeons

Career highlights
- FIBA Europe Cup Top Scorer (2020); FIBA Europe Cup assists leader (2020); 3× CBA scoring champion (2021, 2022, 2024)

Robert Wilson Golden III (born October 5, 1991) is an American professional basketball player who last played for Fujian Sturgeons of the Chinese Basketball Association (CBA) He competed in college for Tennessee and Georgia Tech.

== Professional career ==
On July 9, 2017, he signed with ESSM Le Portel of the French Pro A league. On June 10, 2018, Golden was announced by Avtodor of the Russian VTB United League. He spent the 2019–20 season with Bahçeşehir Koleji, averaging 23.0 points, 4.3 rebounds, and 7.8 assists per game.

On September 30, 2020, Golden signed with the Fujian Sturgeons where he went on to play two seasons. On March 10, 2022, Golden scored a career-high 63 points in a regular season loss against Shandong.

Golden was the scoring champion of the 2023–24 CBA season while playing for the Sichuan Blue Whales, averaging 33.3 points per game.

In May 2024, Golden joined Al-Ahly Ly for the 2024 BAL playoffs.

== Career statistics ==
Legend
GP	Games played	GS	Games started	MPG	Minutes per game
FG%	Field goal percentage	3P%	3-point field goal percentage	FT%	Free throw percentage
RPG	Rebounds per game	APG	Assists per game	SPG	Steals per game
BPG	Blocks per game	PPG	Points per game	**Bold**	Career high

=== CBA statistics ===
Year	Team	GP	GS	MPG	FG%	3P%	FT%	RPG	APG	SPG	BPG	PPG
2020–21	Fujian	**41**	**34**	29.6	**.518**	**.430**	.884	4.5	8.1	0.9	0.0	30.4
2021–22	Fujian	20	20	**39.4**	.478	.344	**.958**	**5.7**	**9.5**	**1.1**	0.0	**44.1**

Source: basketball-stats.de (Date: 27. March 2022)
