= 2019–20 FIBA Europe Cup =

- Season: 2019–20
- Dates: 2–9 October 2019 (qualifying round); 22 October 2019 – 29 April 2020 (competition proper)
- Teams: 32 (regular season); 42 (overall)

Finals
- Champions: Null and void

Statistical leaders
Points	(United States) Trae Golden	19.9
Rebounds	(Australia) Mangok Mathiang	11.2
Assists	(United States) Trae Golden	8.5
Index Rating	(United States) Jeff Withey	23.7

Records
- Biggest home win: Ventspils 105–57 APOEL (20 November 2019)
- Biggest away win: Sigal Prishtina 72-122 Ventspils (27 November 2019)
- Highest scoring: Kataja 112–105 Legia (13 November 2019)

Seasons
- ← 2018–19 2020–21 →

The 2019–20 FIBA Europe Cup was the fifth season of the FIBA Europe Cup, a European professional basketball competition for clubs, that was launched by FIBA.

On 12 March 2020, FIBA suspended all its competitions due to the coronavirus pandemic and terminated the FIBA Europe Cup. However, Pınar Karşıyaka requested to finish the competition with a Final Four format as in the 2019–20 Basketball Champions League.

On 16 June 2020, FIBA Europe announced the season was declared void and would not be finished due to the COVID-19 pandemic.

== Team allocation ==
Teams from around Europe can sign up to play in the FIBA Europe Cup. Spots are granted based on results in domestic championships.

Teams registered were officially published on 23 July 2019.

Regular season
(Belgium) Spirou (3rd)	(Israel) Ironi Nes Ziona (6th)	(Latvia) Ventspils (CL QR2)	(Belarus) Tsmoki Minsk (CL QR1)
(Belgium) Phoenix Brussels (4th)	(Netherlands) Landstede Hammers (1st)	(Poland) Legia (CL QR2)	(Bulgaria) Balkan (CL QR1)
(Hungary) Egis Körmend (2nd)	(Romania) Sibiu (2nd)	(Portugal) Benfica (CL QR2)	(Denmark) Bakken Bears (CL QR1)
(Hungary) Pécs Veolia (3rd)	(Russia) Enisey (9th)	(Sweden) Södertälje Kings (CL QR2)	(Kosovo) Sigal Prishtina (CL QR1)
(Bulgaria) Levski Lukoil (2nd)	(Turkey) Bahçeşehir Koleji (9th)	(Switzerland) Fribourg Olympic (CL QR2)	(Netherlands) Donar (CL QR1)
(Cyprus) APOEL (3rd)	(Cyprus) Keravnos (CL QR2)	(Ukraine) Kyiv Basket (CL QR2)	(Romania) Oradea (CL QR1)
(Germany) medi Bayreuth (12th)	(Finland) ~~Karhu~~ (CL QR2)	(Austria) Kapfenberg Bulls (CL QR1)	(Slovakia) Inter Bratislava (CL QR1)
Qualification round
(Belarus) Borisfen (2nd)	(Finland) Kataja (6th)	(Romania) U-BT Cluj-Napoca (3rd)	(Ukraine) Dnipro (4th)
(Bulgaria) Beroe (3rd)	(Kosovo) Rahoveci (2nd)	(Sweden) Borås (2nd)	
(Estonia) Tartu Ülikool (5th)	(Netherlands) ZZ Leiden (3rd)	(Turkey) Pınar Karşıyaka (11th)	

=== Applicants ===
The following 4 teams chose the option of ending their continental adventure if they were eliminated from the Champions League qualifying rounds and therefore refuse to participate in the FIBA Europe Cup:

- (Finland) Karhu
- (Lithuania) Lietkabelis
- (Poland) Polski Cukier Toruń
- (Spain) San Pablo Burgos

== Round and draw dates ==
The schedule of the competition is as follows.

Phase	Round	Draw date	First leg	Second leg
Qualifying rounds	Qualifying round	24 July 2019	1–2 October 2019	9 October 2019
Regular season	Matchday 1	24 July 2019	22–23 October 2019	
Regular season	Matchday 2	24 July 2019	29–30 October 2019	
Regular season	Matchday 3	24 July 2019	5–6 November 2019	
Regular season	Matchday 4	24 July 2019	12–13 November 2019	
Regular season	Matchday 5	24 July 2019	19–20 November 2019	
Regular season	Matchday 6	24 July 2019	27 November 2019	
Second round	Matchday 1	24 July 2019	11 December 2019	
Second round	Matchday 2	24 July 2019	18 December 2019	
Second round	Matchday 3	24 July 2019	7–8 January 2020	
Second round	Matchday 4	24 July 2019	20–22 January 2020	
Second round	Matchday 5	24 July 2019	29 January 2020	
Second round	Matchday 6	24 July 2019	4–5 February 2020	
Play-offs	Quarter-finals	24 July 2019	4 March 2020	11 March 2020
Play-offs	Semi-finals	24 July 2019	25 March 2020	1 April 2020
Play-offs	Finals	24 July 2019	22 April 2020	29 April 2020

== Qualifying round ==
The draw for the qualifying round will be held on 24 July 2019 at the FIBA headquarters in Munich, Germany.

Teams are divided into seeded and unseeded teams based on their club coefficients, and then drawn into two-legged home-and-away ties, being the second leg played at the home of the seeded team.

=== Seeds ===
Seeded teams (Ukraine) Dnipro (Finland) Kataja (Romania) U-BT Cluj-Napoca (Turkey) Pınar Karşıyaka (Netherlands) ZZ Leiden	Non-seeded teams (Bulgaria) Beroe (Belarus) Borisfen (Sweden) Borås (Kosovo) Rahoveci (Estonia) Tartu Ülikool

=== Qualifying round ===
A total of 10 teams played in the first qualifying round. The first legs were played on 2 October, and the second legs were played on 9 October 2019.

Team 1	Agg.	Team 2	1st leg	2nd leg
Tartu Ülikool (Estonia)	165–171	(Finland) Kataja	78–72	87–99
Beroe (Bulgaria)	172–179	(Netherlands) ZZ Leiden	86–71	86–108
Borisfen (Belarus)	147–182	(Ukraine) Dnipro	76–101	71–81
Borås (Sweden)	128–155	(Turkey) Pınar Karşıyaka	70–77	58–78
Rahoveci (Kosovo)	120–189	(Romania) U-BT Cluj-Napoca	73–98	47–91

== Regular season ==
Location of teams of the 2019–20 FIBA Europe Cup regular season.
Red: Group A; Yellow: Group B; Green: Group C; Dark Green: Group D; Purple: Group E. Pink: Group F; Blue: Group G; Orange: Group H.

The draw for the regular season was held on 24 July 2019 at the FIBA headquarters in Munich, Germany.

The 32 teams are drawn into eight groups of four, a maximum of two clubs from the same country can be in the same group. In each group, teams play against each other home-and-away in a round-robin format. The group winners and runners-up advance to the second round, while the third-placed teams and fourth-placed teams are eliminated.

The following 4 teams chose the option of ending their continental adventure if they were eliminated from the Champions League qualifying rounds and therefore refuse to participate in the FIBA Europe Cup:

- (Finland) ~~Karhu~~
- (Lithuania) Lietkabelis
- (Poland) Polski Cukier Toruń
- (Spain) San Pablo Burgos
Notes:
- Strikethrough teams were eliminated from the Basketball Champions League qualifying rounds and refused to participate in the FIBA Europe Cup.
- Teams marked in italics advanced to the Basketball Champions League regular season.

A total of 32 teams play in the regular season: the 12 teams directly qualified, the 5 winners of the qualifying round, the 15 of 16 losers of the 2019–20 Champions League qualifying rounds.

Depending on the number of teams mentioned above that were eliminated from the Basketball Champions League qualifying rounds and with the aim to complete the 32 places in the regular season, the number of the defeated teams in the qualifying round of the FIBA Europe Cup that advanced to the regular season were determined by the point difference recorded at the end of their pairings. In their draw, the first qualifying round was used for tie-breaking. In the draw persists, the next criterion was the performance of clubs in the last three seasons at the European competitions.

The match-days are on 22–23 October, 29–30 October, 5–6 November, 12–13 November, 19–20 November and 27 November 2019.

=== Group A ===
Pos	Team	Pld	W	L	PF	PA	PD	Pts	Qualification	BEN	LEI	INT	PEC
1	(Portugal) Benfica	6	5	1	517	489	+28	11	Advance to second round	—	103–99	77–68	85–66
2	(Netherlands) ZZ Leiden	6	4	2	533	503	+30	10	Advance to second round	84–68	—	80–67	105–100
3	(Slovakia) Inter Bratislava	6	2	4	486	520	−34	8		91–95	78–88	—	88–87
4	(Hungary) Pécs Veolia	6	1	5	514	538	−24	7		81–89	87–77	93–94	—

Source: FIBA Europe Cup
Legend: Blue = home team win; Red = away team win.

=== Group B ===
Pos	Team	Pld	W	L	PF	PA	PD	Pts	Qualification	INZ	LAN	KER	KAP
1	(Israel) Ironi Nes Ziona	6	6	0	460	405	+55	12	Advance to second round	—	96–90	87–78	20–0
2	(Netherlands) Landstede Hammers	6	3	3	530	477	+53	9	Advance to second round	88–94	—	78–72	89–64
3	(Cyprus) Keravnos	6	2	4	464	491	−27	8		74–85	88–85	—	76–70
4	(Austria) Kapfenberg Bulls	6	1	5	362	443	−81	7		75–82	67–100	86–76	—

Source: FIBA Europe Cup
Legend: Blue = home team win; Red = away team win.

=== Group C ===
Pos	Team	Pld	W	L	PF	PA	PD	Pts	Qualification	VEN	BAY	PRI	APO
1	(Latvia) Ventspils	6	6	0	602	439	+163	12	Advance to second round	—	95–77	104–84	105–57
2	(Germany) medi Bayreuth	6	4	2	542	472	+70	10	Advance to second round	80–84	—	97–89	112–68
3	(Kosovo) Sigal Prishtina	6	2	4	513	570	−57	8		72–122	68–93	—	93–74
4	(Cyprus) APOEL	6	0	6	416	592	−176	6		69–92	68–83	80–107	—

Source: FIBA Europe Cup
Legend: Blue = home team win; Red = away team win.

=== Group D ===
Pos	Team	Pld	W	L	PF	PA	PD	Pts	Qualification	BAH	ORA	FRI	SIB
1	(Turkey) Bahçeşehir Koleji	6	5	1	472	430	+42	11	Advance to second round	—	66–71	79–70	80–71
2	(Romania) Oradea	6	4	2	461	456	+5	10	Advance to second round	77–88	—	67–87	92–86
3	(Switzerland) Fribourg Olympic	6	2	4	428	466	−38	8		60–76	60–79	—	69–91
4	(Romania) Sibiu	6	1	5	472	481	−9	7		81–83	69–75	74–82	—

Source: FIBA Europe Cup
Legend: Blue = home team win; Red = away team win.

=== Group E ===
Pos	Team	Pld	W	L	PF	PA	PD	Pts	Qualification	KSK	SPI	DON	BRU
1	(Turkey) Pınar Karşıyaka	6	5	1	496	410	+86	11	Advance to second round	—	92–54	77–57	93–90
2	(Belgium) Spirou	6	3	3	473	467	+6	9	Advance to second round	81–76	—	87–56	72–75
3	(Netherlands) Donar	6	2	4	386	454	−68	8		62–79	64–78	—	75–63
4	(Belgium) Phoenix Brussels	6	2	4	468	492	−24	8		66–79	104–101	70–72	—

Source: FIBA Europe Cup
Legend: Blue = home team win; Red = away team win.

=== Group F ===
Pos	Team	Pld	W	L	PF	PA	PD	Pts	Qualification	KYI	TSM	LEV	DNI
1	(Ukraine) Kyiv Basket	6	4	2	506	492	+14	10	Advance to second round	—	74–99	86–66	95–88
2	(Belarus) Tsmoki Minsk	6	3	3	511	500	+11	9	Advance to second round	84–92	—	81–68	108–101
3	(Bulgaria) Levski Lukoil	6	3	3	453	453	0	9		76–83	75–64	—	85–78
4	(Ukraine) Dnipro	6	2	4	497	522	−25	8		79–76	90–75	61–83	—

Source: FIBA Europe Cup
Legend: Blue = home team win; Red = away team win.

=== Group G ===
Pos	Team	Pld	W	L	PF	PA	PD	Pts	Qualification	CLU	ENI	BAL	SOD
1	(Romania) U-BT Cluj-Napoca	6	5	1	533	490	+43	11	Advance to second round	—	97–83	92–80	85–74
2	(Russia) Enisey	6	4	2	535	478	+57	10	Advance to second round	97–87	—	84–69	99–78
3	(Bulgaria) Balkan	6	2	4	480	524	−44	8		76–86	82–80	—	90–89
4	(Sweden) Södertälje Kings	6	1	5	479	535	−56	7		80–86	65–92	93–83	—

Source: FIBA Europe Cup
Legend: Blue = home team win; Red = away team win.

=== Group H ===
Pos	Team	Pld	W	L	PF	PA	PD	Pts	Qualification	BAK	KOR	KAT	LEG
1	(Denmark) Bakken Bears	6	5	1	502	476	+26	11	Advance to second round	—	81–87	89–70	77–74
2	(Hungary) Egis Körmend	6	4	2	491	465	+26	10	Advance to second round	80–86	—	81–75	74–60
3	(Finland) Kataja	6	2	4	489	537	−48	8		82–85	95–91	—	112–105
4	(Poland) Legia	6	1	5	476	480	−4	7		83–84	68–78	86–55	—

Source: FIBA Europe Cup
Legend: Blue = home team win; Red = away team win.

== Second round ==
In each group, teams play against each other home-and-away in a round-robin format. The group winners and runners-up advance to the quarterfinals, while the third-placed teams and fourth-placed teams are eliminated.

A total of 16 teams play in the second round: the eight group winners and the eight runners-up of the regular season. The match-days will be on 11 December, 18 December 2019, 7–8 January, 20–22 January, 29 January and 4–5 February 2020.

=== Group I ===
Pos	Team	Pld	W	L	PF	PA	PD	Pts	Qualification	BAY	BAK	BEN	SPI
1	(Germany) medi Bayreuth	6	5	1	581	526	+55	11	Advance to quarterfinals	—	105–82	96–78	100–89
2	(Denmark) Bakken Bears	6	4	2	542	527	+15	10	Advance to quarterfinals	110–92	—	88–75	101–87
3	(Portugal) Benfica	6	3	3	494	494	0	9		77–91	90–79	—	89–62
4	(Belgium) Spirou	6	0	6	484	554	−70	6		90–97	78–82	78–85	—

Source: FIBA Europe Cup
Legend: Blue = home team win; Red = away team win.

=== Group J ===
Pos	Team	Pld	W	L	PF	PA	PD	Pts	Qualification	TSM	CLU	INZ	ORA
1	(Belarus) Tsmoki Minsk	6	4	2	481	446	+35	10	Advance to quarterfinals	—	78–76	97–75	68–62
2	(Romania) U-BT Cluj-Napoca	6	4	2	474	460	+14	10	Advance to quarterfinals	76–74	—	82–71	81–76
3	(Israel) Ironi Nes Ziona	6	2	4	476	501	−25	8		84–75	81–84	—	85–77
4	(Romania) Oradea	6	2	4	454	478	−24	8		73–89	80–75	86–80	—

Source: FIBA Europe Cup
Legend: Blue = home team win; Red = away team win.

=== Group K ===
Pos	Team	Pld	W	L	PF	PA	PD	Pts	Qualification	VEN	KYI	KOR	LAN
1	(Latvia) Ventspils	6	5	1	558	479	+79	11	Advance to quarterfinals	—	78–81	96–81	111–74
2	(Ukraine) Kyiv Basket	6	4	2	481	484	−3	10	Advance to quarterfinals	80–88	—	80–78	89–76
3	(Hungary) Egis Körmend	6	3	3	512	516	−4	9		76–96	96–74	—	87–80
4	(Netherlands) Landstede Hammers	6	0	6	475	547	−72	6		87–89	68–77	90–94	—

Source: FIBA Europe Cup
Legend: Blue = home team win; Red = away team win.

=== Group L ===
Pos	Team	Pld	W	L	PF	PA	PD	Pts	Qualification	KSK	BAH	ENI	LEI
1	(Turkey) Pınar Karşıyaka	6	6	0	594	421	+173	12	Advance to quarterfinals	—	96–65	85–74	112–76
2	(Turkey) Bahçeşehir Koleji	6	3	3	508	554	−46	9	Advance to quarterfinals	68–100	—	103–95	93–71
3	(Russia) Enisey	6	2	4	526	547	−21	8		73–96	105–90	—	96–84
4	(Netherlands) ZZ Leiden	6	1	5	472	578	−106	7		65–105	87–89	89–83	—

Source: FIBA Europe Cup
Legend: Blue = home team win; Red = away team win.

== Play-offs ==
Quarter-finals
(Turkey) Bahçeşehir Koleji	78	112	190
(Latvia) Ventspils	77	90	167
(Denmark) Bakken Bears	79	93	172
(Belarus) Tsmoki Minsk	66	87	153
(Romania) U-BT Cluj-Napoca	83	87	170
(Germany) medi Bayreuth	82	100	182
(Ukraine) Kyiv Basket	71	67	138
(Turkey) Pınar Karşıyaka	89	88	177

Semi-finals (Cancelled)
Cancelled
(Turkey) Bahçeşehir Koleji
(Denmark) Bakken Bears
Cancelled
(Germany) medi Bayreuth
(Turkey) Pınar Karşıyaka

Final (Cancelled)
Cancelled
–
–

=== Quarterfinals ===
The first legs were played on 4 March, and the second legs on 11 March 2020.

Team 1	Agg.	Team 2	1st leg	2nd leg
U-BT Cluj-Napoca (Romania)	170–182	(Germany) medi Bayreuth	83–82	87–100
Bakken Bears (Denmark)	172–153	(Belarus) Tsmoki Minsk	79–66	93–87
Bahçeşehir Koleji (Turkey)	190–167	(Latvia) Ventspils	78–77	112–90
Kyiv Basket (Ukraine)	138–177	(Turkey) Pınar Karşıyaka	71–89	67–88

=== Semifinals ===
The first legs were to be played on 25 March, and the second legs on 1 April 2020.

Team 1	Agg.	Team 2	1st leg	2nd leg
Medi Bayreuth (Germany)	Cancelled	(Turkey) Pınar Karşıyaka	Cancelled	Cancelled
Bahçeşehir Koleji (Turkey)	Cancelled	(Denmark) Bakken Bears	Cancelled	Cancelled

=== Finals ===
The first leg were to be played on 22 April, and the second leg on 29 April 2020.

Team 1	Agg.	Team 2	1st leg	2nd leg
N/A	Cancelled	N/A	Cancelled	Cancelled

== See also ==
- 2019–20 EuroLeague
- 2019–20 EuroCup Basketball
- 2019–20 Basketball Champions League
