= BC Tsmoki-Minsk II =

Tsmoki-Minsk II
- Leagues: Belarus Premier League
- Founded: 2006; 19 years ago
- History: BC Minsk-2006 (2006–2012); BC Tsmoki-Minsk (2012–present)
- Arena: Minsk Arena
- Capacity: 15,000
- Location: Minsk, Belarus
- Team colors: Navy, White
- President: Yuri Shakola
- Website: Link (in English)
Home	Away

BC Tsmoki Minsk II (Belarusian: Цмокі-Мінск) is the reserve team of BC Tsmoki-Minsk, a professional basketball club that is based in Minsk, Belarus. The team plays in the Belarus Premier League.

== Season by season ==
Season	Tier	League	Pos.	W–L
2016–17	1	Premier League	5th	27–19
2017–18	1	Premier League	6th	28–24
