= 2018–19 Belarusian Premier League (basketball) =

Belarusian Premier League
- Duration: 13 October 2018 – May 2019
- Teams: 10

Finals
- Champions: Tsmoki-Minsk (11th title)
- Runners-up: Borisfen

The 2018–19 Belarusian Premier League season is the 27th season of the top tier basketball league in Belarus.

== Competition format ==
Ten teams joined the regular season, that consisted in a four-legged round-robin competition, later dividing all the teams into two groups. The six teams of the Group A and the two best of the Group B joined the playoffs.

== Regular season ==
=== Standings ===
| Pos | Team | Pld | W | L | PF | PA | PD | Pts | Qualification |
|---|---|---|---|---|---|---|---|---|---|
| 1 | Borisfen | 18 | 16 | 2 | 1767 | 1264 | +503 | 34 | Qualification to the Group A |
| 2 | Tsmoki-Minsk Reserves | 18 | 16 | 2 | 1663 | 1020 | +643 | 34 | Qualification to the Group A |
| 3 | Grodno 93 | 18 | 16 | 2 | 1882 | 1293 | +589 | 34 | Qualification to the Group A |
| 4 | Tsmoki-Minsk II | 18 | 10 | 8 | 1340 | 1273 | +67 | 28 | Qualification to the Group A |
| 5 | Rubon | 18 | 10 | 8 | 1556 | 1400 | +156 | 28 | Qualification to the Group B |
| 6 | Impuls | 18 | 9 | 9 | 1496 | 1503 | −7 | 27 | Qualification to the Group B |
| 7 | Brest | 18 | 6 | 12 | 1346 | 1640 | −294 | 24 | Qualification to the Group B |
| 8 | GOCOR Sozh Gomel | 18 | 3 | 15 | 1170 | 1594 | −424 | 21 | Qualification to the Group B |
| 9 | Prinemanye | 18 | 2 | 16 | 1026 | 1763 | −737 | 20 | Qualification to the Group B |
| 10 | RCOP-SDUSHOR | 18 | 2 | 16 | 1180 | 1676 | −496 | 20 | Qualification to the Group B |

Source: BBF.by

=== Results ===
| Home \ Away | BOR | BRE | GOM | GRO | IMP | PRI | SDU | RUB | TM2 | TSM |
|---|---|---|---|---|---|---|---|---|---|---|
| Borisfen | — | 127–84 | 89–57 | 85–101 | 77–65 | 128–60 | 106–64 | 92–85 | 97–55 | 77–55 |
| Brest | 71–115 | — | 101–68 | 82–106 | 73–60 | 81–75 | 101–88 | 92–103 | 63–96 | 47–92 |
| GOCOR Sozh Gomel | 56–85 | 74–71 | — | 55–123 | 78–100 | 79–59 | 96–99 | 85–96 | 67–74 | 38–82 |
| Grodno 93 | 71–108 | 110–65 | 100–35 | — | 120–80 | 135–58 | 144–50 | 109–95 | 88–70 | 75–85 |
| Impuls | 77–109 | 81–67 | 78–59 | 85–106 | — | 123–53 | 112–76 | 93–92 | 61–83 | 55–102 |
| Prinemanye | 72–137 | 73–91 | 84–72 | 30–123 | 68–110 | — | 66–53 | 61–90 | 62–93 | 25–100 |
| RCOP-SDUSHOR | 61–90 | 64–90 | 78–89 | 59–85 | 58–60 | 68–65 | — | 70–86 | 74–81 | 49–99 |
| Rubon | 66–76 | 107–76 | 94–49 | 98–111 | 112–90 | 85–35 | 101–61 | — | 69–58 | 64–79 |
| Tsmoki-Minsk II | 78–87 | 81–42 | 72–59 | 74–88 | 74–85 | 94–31 | 84–58 | 71–56 | — | 50–91 |
| Tsmoki-Minsk Reserves | 85–82 | 120–49 | 109–54 | 79–87 | 96–61 | 101–49 | 101–50 | 92–57 | 95–51 | — |

Source: BBF.by
Legend: Blue = home team win; Red = away team win.

== Second stage ==
=== Group A ===
==== Standings ====
| Pos | Team | Pld | W | L | PF | PA | PD | Pts | Qualification |
|---|---|---|---|---|---|---|---|---|---|
| 1 | Borisfen | 30 | 26 | 4 | 2837 | 2148 | +689 | 56 | Qualification for the playoffs |
| 2 | Tsmoki-Minsk Reserves | 30 | 23 | 7 | 2637 | 1953 | +684 | 53 | Qualification for the playoffs |
| 3 | Grodno 93 | 30 | 22 | 8 | 2887 | 2324 | +563 | 52 | Qualification for the playoffs |
| 4 | Tsmoki-Minsk II | 30 | 11 | 19 | 2181 | 2315 | −134 | 41 | Qualification for the playoffs |

Source: BBF.by

==== Results ====
| Home \ Away | BOR | GRO | TM2 | TSM | BOR | GRO | TM2 | TSM |
|---|---|---|---|---|---|---|---|---|
| Borisfen | — | 105–101 | 104–65 | 86–62 | — | 95–65 | 76–93 | 88–85 |
| Grodno 93 | 82–99 | — | 94–81 | 86–93 | 68–99 | — | 82–64 | 85–83 |
| Tsmoki-Minsk II | 50–76 | 85–90 | — | 57–91 | 58–85 | 68–98 | — | 68–70 |
| Tsmoki-Minsk Reserves | 84–80 | 81–71 | 93–71 | — | 71–77 | 78–83 | 84–81 | — |

Source: BBF.by
Legend: Blue = home team win; Red = away team win.

=== Group B ===
==== Standings ====
| Pos | Team | Pld | W | L | PF | PA | PD | Pts | Qualification |
|---|---|---|---|---|---|---|---|---|---|
| 1 | Impuls | 28 | 19 | 9 | 2500 | 2236 | +264 | 47 | Qualification for the playoffs |
| 2 | Rubon | 28 | 18 | 10 | 2542 | 2127 | +415 | 46 | Qualification for the playoffs |
| 3 | Brest | 28 | 9 | 19 | 2158 | 2551 | −393 | 37 | |
| 4 | RCOP-SDUSHOR | 28 | 6 | 22 | 1919 | 2530 | −611 | 34 | |
| 5 | Prinemanye | 28 | 5 | 23 | 1744 | 2663 | −919 | 33 | |
| 6 | GOCOR Sozh Gomel | 28 | 5 | 23 | 1907 | 2465 | −558 | 33 | |

Source: BBF.by

==== Results ====
| Home \ Away | BRE | GOM | IMP | PRI | SDU | RUB |
|---|---|---|---|---|---|---|
| Brest | — | 74–58 | 67–116 | 94–74 | 75–83 | 93–110 |
| GOCOR Sozh Gomel | 91–74 | — | 101–106 | 79–90 | 77–74 | 88–115 |
| Impuls | 94–93 | 74–66 | — | 86–48 | 115–49 | 104–81 |
| Prinemanye | 93–83 | 75–73 | 68–120 | — | 84–88 | 59–90 |
| RCOP-SDUSHOR | 85–92 | 87–65 | 71–92 | 84–65 | — | 51–91 |
| Rubon | 107–67 | 102–39 | 89–97 | 103–62 | 98–67 | — |

Source: BBF.by
Legend: Blue = home team win; Red = away team win.

== Playoffs ==
Quarterfinals will be played in a best-of-three games format and the rest of series in a 2-2-1 format.

=== Bracket ===
Quarter-finals
Grodno 93 | 2
Tsmoki-Minsk II | 0
Borisfen | 2
Rubon | 0
Tsmoki-Minsk Reserves | 2
Impuls | 1

Semi-finals
Tsmoki-Minsk | 3
Grodno 93 | 0
Borisfen | 3
Tsmoki-Minsk Reserves | 0

Final
Tsmoki-Minsk | 3
Borisfen | 0
Third place
Tsmoki-Minsk Reserves | 3
Grodno 93 | 1

=== Quarter-finals ===
| Team 1 | Series | Team 2 | Game 1 | Game 2 | Game 3 |
|---|---|---|---|---|---|
| Borisfen | 2–0 | Rubon | 99–79 | 115–75 | |
| Tsmoki-Minsk Reserves | 2–1 | Impuls | 96–90 | 85–92 | 87–82 |
| Tsmoki-Minsk II | 0–2 | Grodno 93 | 50–84 | 72–79 | |

=== Semi-finals ===
| Team 1 | Series | Team 2 | Game 1 | Game 2 | Game 3 | Game 4 | Game 5 |
|---|---|---|---|---|---|---|---|
| Tsmoki-Minsk | 3–0 | Grodno 93 | 93–63 | 109–89 | 104–58 | | |
| Borisfen | 3–0 | Tsmoki-Minsk Reserves | 68–62 | 76–65 | 74–72 | | |

=== Third-place series ===
| Team 1 | Series | Team 2 | Game 1 | Game 2 | Game 3 | Game 4 | Game 5 |
|---|---|---|---|---|---|---|---|
| Tsmoki-Minsk Reserves | 3–1 | Grodno 93 | 93–81 | 69–71 | 90–76 | 88–80 | |

=== Finals ===
| Team 1 | Series | Team 2 | Game 1 | Game 2 | Game 3 | Game 4 | Game 5 |
|---|---|---|---|---|---|---|---|
| Borisfen | 0–3 | Tsmoki-Minsk | 64–76 | 69–89 | 71–80 | | |

== 5th to 8th place playoffs ==
=== Bracket ===
Semi-finals
Tsmoki-Minsk II | 2
Brest | 1
Impuls | 2
Rubon | 1

Fifth place
Tsmoki-Minsk II | 0
Impuls | 2
Seventh place
Rubon | 2
Brest | 0

=== Semifinals ===
| Team 1 | Series | Team 2 | Game 1 | Game 2 | Game 3 |
|---|---|---|---|---|---|
| Tsmoki-Minsk II | 2–1 | Brest | 115–85 | 73–77 | 85–62 |
| Impuls | 2–1 | Rubon | 110–96 | 71–87 | 114–88 |

=== Seventh-place series ===
| Team 1 | Series | Team 2 | Game 1 | Game 2 | Game 3 |
|---|---|---|---|---|---|
| Rubon | 2–0 | Brest | 125–75 | 96–56 | |

=== Fifth-place series ===
| Team 1 | Series | Team 2 | Game 1 | Game 2 | Game 3 |
|---|---|---|---|---|---|
| Tsmoki-Minsk II | 0–2 | Impuls | 72–87 | 86–88 | |

== Belarusian clubs in European competitions ==
| Team | Competition | Progress |
|---|---|---|
| Tsmoki-Minsk | Champions League | First qualifying round |
| Tsmoki-Minsk | FIBA Europe Cup | Regular season |
