= BC Borisfen =

Borisfen
- Nickname: Knights
- Leagues: Belarusian Premier League; FIBA Europe Cup (suspended); European North Basketball League (suspended)
- Founded: 3 September 2010; 15 years ago
- History: BC Borisfen; 2010–present
- Arena: Olympic Stadium
- Capacity: 1500
- Location: Mogilev, Belarus
- President: Andrey Nikolaevich Kotov
- Head coach: Andrey Krivonos
- 2024/2025 position: 4
- Website: bcborisfen.by
Home	Away

BC Borisfen, also known as Borisfen Mogilev (in Belarusian: Барысфэн Магілёў; in Russian: Борисфен Могилёв), is a Belarusian basketball club based in Mogilev. It plays in the Belarusian Premier League and played in the European North Basketball League until it was suspended.

== History ==
The club was established on 3 September 2010. The club was founded after BC Temp-OSHVSM disappeared from the highest Belarusian basketball league. In 2011, Borisfen played in the Belarusian Second League for one season.

In the 2016–17 season, Borisfen made its debut in the Baltic Basketball League. Domestically, in 2018 and 2019, Borisfen finished as runners-up behind BC Tsmoki-Minsk. In the 2019–20 season, Borisfen made its debut in a European competition, playing in the qualifying rounds of the FIBA Europe Cup. The team lost to BC Dnipro.

Borisfen qualified for the regular season of the 2020–21 FIBA Europe Cup., but due to the discovery of COVID-19 in one of the members of the delegation, the team was unable to participate in the games and was sent to quarantine.

In 2021, in the fourth match in the final series, BC Borisfen lost to BC Tsmoki-Minsk by a score 52:85. Thus, BC Borisfen - four-time vice-champion of the Belarusian Basketball Championship. Also, on July 16, it became known that several players left the team, namely: Dupree McBrayer, Darol Hernandez-Zinenko, Tywain МcКee, Brooks DeBisschop and Anton Zaretsky.

In the 2021/2022 season, the club planned to compete in the newly formed European Northern League, where the opponents would also be: Anwil Wloclawek, Basket Brno, BK Liepaja, Enisey Krasnoyarsk, BK Siauliai, Tartu Ulikool Maks and Moorits and BC Valmiera GLASS VIA. The European North Basketball League has excluded BC Borisfen and BC Enisey from the competition from March 1, 2022 due to the war against Ukraine.

In the 2023/2024 season, the club won the Belarusian Cup, beating BC Minsk in the semifinals in the third overtime (108:102). and BC Grodno-93 in the finals (83:75). It was the first cup in Borisfen's history.

In the 2024/2025 season, the club took 3rd place in the Belarusian Cup, losing in the semifinals to BC Minsk (75:69), and beat Rubon (98:75). Borisfen has won the bronze medal of the Cup for the third time in its history. At the end of the regular season, having taken third place, Borysthenes confidently beat Grodno-93-GrGU in the quarterfinals of the playoffs (2:0 in the series); however, they were defeated by BC Minsk (0:3 in the series) and, bringing the series for 3rd place to on the 5th match, lost to BC Rubon (2:3 in the series). Thus, BC Borisfen took the final fourth place and for the first time in 10 years did not appear in the top three.

Before the 2025/2026 season, the team lost not only its foreign players (PJ Byrd, Abu Gbane), but also key members (Artyom Kuzmin, Kirill Sitnik), as well as "veterans" (Andrey Ageyenko, Artyom Malkov, Aleksandr Kopachyov). Nevertheless, the roster was replenished with Kirill Shishlovsky (from "Impulse-BGUIR"), Vadim Fedkin ("Cheboksary Hawks", Russian Higher League), Ivan Aladko and Vladislav Mikulskiy (both - "BK Grodno-93").

== European record ==
Season	Competition	Round	Club	Home	Away
2019–20	FIBA Europe Cup	Qualifying round	(Ukraine) Dnipro	76–101	81–71
2020–21	FIBA Europe Cup	Regular season	(Netherlands) Donar	DNP^{1}	
2020–21	FIBA Europe Cup	Regular season	(Netherlands) Heroes Den Bosch	DNP^{1}	
2020–21	FIBA Europe Cup	Regular season	(Russia) Parma	DNP^{1}	

^1 Borisfen withdrew from the 2020–21 FIBA Europe Cup after players on the team were diagnosed with COVID-19.

== Players ==
=== Current roster ===
BC Borisfen roster
Players
Coaches

Pos.	No.	Nat.	Name
2	SG	(Belarus) BLR	Daniil Gorbachevsky
6	SG	(Belarus) BLR	Uladzislau Shvakel
7	F	(Belarus) BLR	Artem Sekushenko
10	F	(Belarus) BLR	Artem Puchko
35	C	(Russia) RUS	Nikita Shchurat
41	PG	(Belarus) BLR	Anton Shchurko
	SF	(Belarus) BLR	Kirill Shishlovsky
	C	(Russia) RUS	Vadim Fedkin
	SG	(Belarus) BLR	Ivan Aladko
	SG	(Belarus) BLR	Vladislav Mikulskiy

Head coach

- (Belarus) Andrey Krivonos

Assistant coach(es)

- (Belarus) Alexander Gulyaev
- (Belarus) Denis Pastukhov

Legend

- (C) Team captain
- Injured

- Roster
Updated: August 11, 2025
