= 2017–18 Belarusian Premier League (basketball) =

Belarusian Premier League
- Teams: 10

Regular season
- Top seed: Tsmoki Minsk

Finals
- Champions: Tsmoki-Minsk (10th title)
- Runners-up: Borisfen Mogilev
- Third place: Grodno 93
- Fourth place: Rubon Vitebsk

The 2017–18 Belarusian Premier League season was the 26th season of the top tier basketball league in Belarus.

== Competition format ==
Ten teams joined the regular season, that consisted in a four-legged round-robin competition. The eight first qualified teams would join the quarterfinals.

== Regular season ==
Pos	Team	Pld	W	L	PF	PA	PD	Pts	Qualification
1	Grodno 93	36	32	4	3571	2525	+1046	68	Qualification to the Group A
2	Tsmoki-Minsk	36	32	4	3279	2181	+1098	68	Qualification to the Group A
3	Borisfen	36	32	4	3471	2672	+799	68	Qualification to the Group A
4	Rubon Vitebsk	36	21	15	2991	2762	+229	57	Qualification to the Group A
5	Impuls	36	18	18	2777	2867	−90	54	Qualification to the Group A
6	Tsmoki-Minsk II	36	18	18	2732	2732	0	54	Qualification to the Group B
7	Prinemanye	36	8	28	2490	3112	−622	44	Qualification to the Group B
8	GOCOR Sozh Gomel	36	8	28	2338	3146	−808	44	Qualification to the Group B
9	Brest	36	6	30	2632	3462	−830	42	Qualification to the Group B
10	RCOP-SDUSHOR Tsmoki	36	5	31	2358	3180	−822	41	Qualification to the Group B

Source: BBF.by

== Second stage ==
=== Group A ===
Pos	Team	Pld	W	L	PF	PA	PD	Pts	Qualification
1	Tsmoki-Minsk	44	38	6	4071	2812	+1259	82	Qualification to playoffs
2	Grodno 93	44	38	6	4429	3196	+1233	82	Qualification to playoffs
3	Borisfen	44	38	6	4230	3343	+887	82	Qualification to playoffs
4	Rubon Vitebsk	44	22	22	3676	3578	+98	66	Qualification to playoffs
5	Impuls	44	19	25	3365	3760	−395	63	Qualification to playoffs

Source: BBF.by

=== Group B ===
Pos	Team	Pld	W	L	PF	PA	PD	Pts	Qualification
1	Tsmoki-Minsk II	44	24	20	3399	3237	+162	68	Qualification to playoffs
2	GOCOR Sozh Gomel	44	12	32	2894	3765	−871	56	Qualification to playoffs
3	Prinemanye	44	11	33	3092	3747	−655	55	Qualification to playoffs
4	Brest	44	10	34	3279	4110	−831	54	
5	RCOP-SDUSHOR Tsmoki	44	8	36	2944	3831	−887	52	

Source: BBF.by

== Playoffs ==
Quarterfinals were played in a best-of-three games format and the rest of series in a 2-2-1 format.

Quarter-finals
Tsmoki-Minsk	97	85
Prinemanye	43	60
Rubon Vitebsk	72	96	79
Impuls	67	109	66
Grodno 93	95	132
GOCOR Sozh Gomel	60	64
Borisfen	85	68	96
Tsmoki-Minsk II	80	78	68

Semi-finals
Tsmoki-Minsk	111	88	90
Rubon Vitebsk	74	81	59
Grodno 93	85	99	100	107	79
Borisfen	81	109	108	93	80

Final
Tsmoki-Minsk	98	100	94
Borisfen	58	86	82

Source: BBF.by

Third place game
Grodno 93	110	98	103
Rubon Vitebsk	79	73	86

=== 5th to 8th place bracket ===
Semi-finals
Impuls	78	61	69
Prinemanye	68	77	63
Tsmoki-Minsk II	89	80
GOCOR Sozh Gomel	66	70

Final
Impuls	90	59	81
Tsmoki-Minsk II	87	77	72

Seventh place game
GOCOR Sozh Gomel	58	76
Prinemanye	72	93
