= BK Grodno-93 =

Grodno-93
- Leagues: Premier League
- Founded: 1933; 93 years ago
- Arena: Victoria
- Capacity: 800
- Location: Grodno, Belarus
- Team colors: Blue, White
- Head coach: Andrew Vasylivka
- Championships: 8 Belarusian Leagues; 8 Belarusian Cups
- Website: www.grodno93.org
Home	Away

BK Grodno-93 (also BK Hrodna-93) is a basketball club based in Grodno, Belarus, that plays in the Premier League.

== Trophies ==
- Premier League: 8

1996, 1998, 1999, 2000, 2001, 2002, 2003, 2004
