= Belarusian Premier League (basketball) =

Belarusian Basketball Championship
- Founded: 1992; 34 years ago
- First season: 1992–93
- Country: Belarus
- Confederation: FIBA Europe (Europe)
- Divisions: 2
- Number of teams: 14
- Current champions: Grodno-93 (9th title)
- Most championships: Minsk (15 titles)
- TV partners: Belarus 5
- Website: www.bbf.by
- 2025–26 season

The Belarusian Premier League (Belarusian: Вышэйшая ліга Беларусі, romanized: Vysheyshaya liha Byelarusi) or Belarusian Basketball Championship (Belarusian: Чэмпіянат Беларусі па баскетболе, romanized: Chempiyanat Byelarusi pa baskyetbolye) is the highest professional basketball league in Belarus.

== Current clubs ==
In 2023–24 season
| Group A | Group B |
|---|---|
| Minsk (from play-offs) | Minsk-Young |
| Grodno-93 | COR-Victoria Brest |
| Borisfen Mogilev | Grodno-93-GrGU |
| Rubon Vitebsk | RCOP-SDYUSHOR Minsk |
| Minsk-Reserve | COR-MGU Mogilev |
| Impuls-BGUIR Minsk | Rubon-Young Vitebsk |
| Gomel'skie Rysi | Gomel'skie Rysi-Young |

In 2024–25 season
| Group A | Group B |
|---|---|
| Minsk | Grodno-93-GrGU |
| Grodno-93 | Rubon-Young Vitebsk |
| Borisfen Mogilev | Gomel'skie Rysi |
| Rubon Vitebsk | BOC Vitctoria Brest |
| Impuls-BGUIR Minsk | RCOP-SDYUSHOR Minsk |
| | Borisfen-Young Mogilev |
| | RGUOR Minsk |

== Champions ==
| Season | Champion | Score | Runner-up | Third place |
|---|---|---|---|---|
| 1992–93 | RTI Minsk | | RTI-2 Minsk | ENKA Minsk Region |
| 1993–94 | RTI-2-RUOR Minsk | | RTI Minsk | Avtozavodets Minsk |
| 1994–95 | RTI Minsk | | Grodno-93 | Avtozavodets Minsk |
| 1995–96 | Grodno-93 | | RTI Minsk | Avtozavodets Minsk |
| 1996–97 | RUOR Minsk | | Grodno-93 | RTI Minsk |
| 1997–98 | Grodno-93 | | Lokomotiv Vitebsk | OZAA Osipovichi |
| 1999–00 | Grodno-93 | | Spartak Gomel | OZAA Osipovichi |
| 2000–01 | Grodno-93 | | RTI Minsk | Spartak Gomel |
| 2001–02 | Grodno-93 | | Spartak Gomel | OZAA Osipovichi |
| 2002–03 | Grodno-93 | | RTI RUOR Minsk | BC Minsk |
| 2003–04 | Grodno-93 | | Lokomotiv Vitebsk | RSHVSM Minsk |
| 2004–05 | Vitalyur-RGUOR Minsk | | Grodno-93 | Lokomotiv Vitebsk |
| 2005–06 | Vitalyur-RGUOR Minsk | | Grodno-93 | Lokomotiv Vitebsk |
| 2006–07 | Vitalyur-RGUOR Minsk | | Grodno-93 | OZAA Osipovichi |
| 2007–08 | Vitalyur-RGUOR Minsk | | Minsk 2006 | OZAA Osipovichi |
| 2008–09 | Minsk 2006 | 3 – 0 | Vitalyur-RGUOR Minsk | OZAA Osipovichi |
| 2009–10 | Minsk 2006 | 3 – 0 | Grodno-93 | OZAA Osipovichi |
| 2010–11 | Minsk 2006 | 3 – 0 | Grodno-93 | OZAA Osipovichi |
| 2011–12 | Minsk 2006 | 97 – 74 | Grodno-93 | OZAA Osipovichi |
| 2012–13 | Tsmoki-Minsk | 3 – 0 | Grodno-93 | Tsmoki-Minsk II |
| 2013–14 | Tsmoki-Minsk | 3 – 1 | Grodno-93 | Sozh Gomel |
| 2014–15 | Tsmoki-Minsk | 3 – 0 | Grodno-93 | Borisfen Mogilev |
| 2015–16 | Tsmoki-Minsk | 3 – 0 | Grodno-93 | Borisfen Mogilev |
| 2016–17 | Tsmoki-Minsk | 3 – 0 | Grodno-93 | Borisfen Mogilev |
| 2017–18 | Tsmoki-Minsk | 3 – 0 | Borisfen Mogilev | Grodno-93 |
| 2018–19 | Tsmoki-Minsk | 3 – 0 | Borisfen Mogilev | Tsmoki-Minsk Reserves |
| 2019–20 | Tsmoki-Minsk | 92 – 53 | Borisfen Mogilev | Grodno-93 |
| 2020–21 | Tsmoki-Minsk | 3 – 1 | Borisfen Mogilev | Impuls-BGUIR |
| 2021–22 | Tsmoki-Minsk | 3 – 0 | Borisfen Mogilev | Grodno-93 |
| 2022–23 | Minsk | 3 – 0 | Grodno-93 | Borisfen Mogilev |
| 2023–24 | Minsk | 3 – 1 | Grodno-93 | Borisfen Mogilev |
| 2024–25 | Grodno-93 | 3 – 2 | Minsk | Rubon Vitebsk |
| 2025–26 | Grodno-93 | 3 – 2 | Minsk | Borisfen Mogilev |

== See also ==
- VTB United League
- Belarusian Basketball Cup
- Belarusian Basketball Supercup
