= BC Minsk =

Professional basketball team in Minsk, Belarus

Minsk
- Leagues: Belarus Premier League; VTB United League
- Founded: 2006; 19 years ago
- History: BC Minsk-2006 (2006–2012); BC Tsmoki-Minsk (2012–2022); BC Minsk (2022–present)
- Arena: Minsk Arena
- Capacity: 15,000
- Location: Minsk, Belarus
- Team colors: Navy, white
- President: Yuri Shakola
- Head coach: Rostislav Vergun
- Championships: 11 Belarus Championships; 11 Belarus Cups
- Website: Link (in English)
Home	Away

Basketball Club Minsk (Belarusian: Мінск) is a professional basketball club that is based in the city of Minsk, Belarus. They play in the Belarus Premier League and the VTB United League. The team plays its home games at the Minsk Arena.

Established in 2006 as BC Minsk-2006, the club has been the most successful team in Belarusian basketball. Since 2008, Tsmoki has won every Premier League title. In the 2009–10 season, Tsmoki made its European debut in the FIBA EuroChallenge. Since then, the club has participated in a European competition each season. In 2012, the club adopted its current club name Tsmoki-Minsk.

== History ==
The club was founded in 2006, with the name of BC Minsk-2006. In September 2012, the club changed its name to BC Tsmoki-Minsk. In September 2020, Tsmoki-Minsk qualified for the Basketball Champions League (BCL) for the first time in club history after beating Neptunas in the qualifying final. As such, it became the first ever Belarusian team to play in the competition.

== Logos ==
Logo (2019–2022)

Logo (2022–present)

== Players ==
=== Current roster ===
Tsmoki-Minsk roster
Players
Coaches

Pos.	No.	Nat.	Name
SF	3	(Belarus)	Dudu, Benjamin-Pavel	1.98 m (6 ft 6 in)	33 – 29 April 1991
SF	4	(Belarus)	Kasko, Daniil	1.97 m (6 ft 6 in)	21 – 21 March 2004
SG	5	(Belarus)	Barysevich, Daniil	1.95 m (6 ft 5 in)	24 – 6 January 2001
SF	6	(Belarus)	Trastsinetski, Aliaksei	2.00 m (6 ft 7 in)	39 – 2 March 1986
F	9	(Belarus)	Hernandez-Zinenko, Darol	1.84 m (6 ft 0 in)	35 – 15 November 1989
C	11	(Belarus)	Stubeda, Vadzim	2.05 m (6 ft 9 in)	24 – 27 June 2000
F	12	(Belarus)	Beliankou, Yauhen	1.98 m (6 ft 6 in)	29 – 11 June 1995
G	13	(Belarus)	Karattsou, Maksim	1.85 m (6 ft 1 in)	27 – 13 March 1998
F	19	(Belarus)	Vaskautsou, Kiryl	2.01 m (6 ft 7 in)	21 – 15 August 2003
PG	23	(Belarus)	Shcherbakov, Roman	1.85 m (6 ft 1 in)	21 – 5 October 2003
SG	31	(Belarus)	Stabrouski, Andrei	1.84 m (6 ft 0 in)	27 – 29 December 1997
F	35	(Russia)	Kuzmin, Artem	2.01 m (6 ft 7 in)	26 – 16 October 1998
F	73	(Belarus)	Paraliou, Tsimafei	2.08 m (6 ft 10 in)	28 – 17 January 1997
G	77	(Belarus)	Bliznyuk, Uladzislau	1.83 m (6 ft 0 in)	26 – 8 January 1999

Head coach

- (Belarus) Rostislav Vergun

Assistant coach(es)

- (Poland) Wojciech Walich
- (Hungary) Aliaksei Sukhavetski

Legend

- (C) Team captain
- Injured

- Roster
Updated: March 14, 2022

Note: Flags indicate national team eligibility at FIBA-sanctioned events. Players may hold other non-FIBA nationalities not displayed.

=== Notable players ===
Note: Flags indicate national team eligibility at FIBA-sanctioned events. Players may hold other non-FIBA nationalities not displayed.

Criteria

To appear in this section a player must have either:

- Set a club record or won an individual award while at the club
- Played at least one official international match for their national team at any time
- Played at least one official NBA match at any time.

- (Lithuania) Vidas Ginevičius
- (United States) Keith Benson
- (United States) Tierre Brown

== Season by season ==
Season	Tier	League	Pos.	Belarusian Cup	Regional competitions			European competitions		
2006–07	1	Premier League	4th							
2007–08	1	Premier League	3rd	Third place						
2008–09	1	Premier League	1st	Champion						
2009–10	1	Premier League	1st	Champion				3 EuroChallenge	RS	2–4
2010–11	1	Premier League	1st	Champion	VTB United League	RS	4–6	3 EuroChallenge	QR	0–1–1
2011–12	1	Premier League	1st	Champion	VTB United League	RS	1–15	3 EuroChallenge	RS	3–3
2012–13	1	Premier League	1st	Champion	VTB United League	RS	3–15	3 EuroChallenge	T16	5–7
2013–14	1	Premier League	1st	Champion	VTB United League	RS	4–14	3 EuroChallenge	QF	8–6
2014–15	1	Premier League	1st	Champion	VTB United League	15th	7–23	3 EuroChallenge	RS	2–4
2015–16	1	Premier League	1st	Champion	VTB United League	12th	9–21	3 FIBA Europe Cup	R32	8–4
2016–17	1	Premier League	1st	Champion	VTB United League	12th	5–19	3 Champions League	QR2	2–2
2016–17	1	Premier League	1st	Champion	VTB United League	12th	5–19	4 FIBA Europe Cup	R2	8–4
2017–18	1	Premier League	1st	Champion	VTB United League	9th	8–16	3 Champions League	QR3	2–1–1
2017–18	1	Premier League	1st	Champion	VTB United League	9th	8–16	4 FIBA Europe Cup	R16	7–1–6
2018–19	1	Premier League	1st	Champion	VTB United League	14th	4–22	3 Champions League	QR1	1–1
2018–19	1	Premier League	1st	Champion	VTB United League	14th	4–22	4 FIBA Europe Cup	RS	3–3

== Honours and distinctions ==
=== Domestic competitions ===
- Belarusian Premier League

**Champions (16): 2009, 2010, 2011, 2012, 2013, 2014, 2015, 2016, 2017, 2018–19, 2019–20, 2020–21, 2021–22, 2022–23, 2023–24

- Belarusian Basketball Cup

**Champions (14): (14) 2009, 2010, 2011, 2012, 2013, 2014, 2015, 2016, 2017, 2018, 2019, 2020, 2021, 2022

=== Individual Player & Coach awards ===
Best Belarusian Basketball Coach

- (Belarus) Rostislav Vergun: (5) 2017, 2019, 2020, 2021, 2022
