= List of VTB United League annual free throw percentage leaders =

In basketball, a free throw is an unopposed attempt to score points from behind the free throw line. The VTB United League's free throw percentage leader is the player with the highest free throw percentage in a given season.

To qualify as a leader for the free throw percentage, a player must play in at least 60 percent of the total number of possible games.

Nando de Colo is the only player in league history to lead the league in free throw percentage multiple times and also to lead the said statistics in consecutive seasons.

== Free throw Percentage leaders ==
Season	Player	Position (Note: The player's primary position is listed first.)	Team	Games played	Free throws made	Free throws attempted	Free throw %	Ref.
2009–10	(United States) (Russia) Kelly McCarty	G/F	BC Khimki	8	30	32	.9375	
2010–11	(United States) Terrell Lyday	G	BC UNICS Kazan	8	43	50	.8600	
2011–12	(Russia) Aleksey Kotishevskiy	G	BC Spartak Saint Petersburg	11	12	12	1.000	
2012–13	(Russia) Sergey Karasev	G/F	Triumph Lyubertsy	20	112	126	.8793	
2013–14	(Lithuania) Renaldas Seibutis	G	BC Rytas Vilnius	18	49	51	.9608	
2014–15	(France) Nando De Colo	G	CSKA Moscow	32	89	99	.8990	
2015–16	(Serbia) (Bulgaria) Branko Mirkovic	G	Tsmoki-Minsk	28	38	39	.9744	
2016–17	(France) Nando De Colo (2×)	G	CSKA Moscow	24	115	125	.9200	
2017–18	(France) Nando De Colo (3×)	G	CSKA Moscow	26	126	134	.9403	
2018–19	(France) Nando De Colo (4×)	G	CSKA Moscow	25	99	105	.9429	
2019–20 (Note: The number of games played during this season was reduced due to the COVID-19 Pandemic)	(United States) Markel Starks	G	BC Avtodor	18	38	40	.9500	
2020–21	(United States) Cecil Williams	F	Enea Zielona Góra	16	20	20	1.000	
