= List of VTB United League season blocks leaders =

In basketball, a block (short for blocked shot) occurs when a defender deflects or stops a field goal attempt without committing a foul. The VTB United League's blocks title is awarded to the player with the highest blocks per game average in a given regular season.

== Block leaders ==
Season	Player	Position (Note: The player's primary position is listed.)	Nationality	Team	Country	Games	Total	BPG	Ref(s)
2009–10	Hasan Rizvić	C	Slovenia	Azovmash	Ukraine	6	14	2.33	
2010–11	Shawn King	C	Saint Vincent and the Grenadines	Minsk-2006	Belarus	10	17	1.70	
2011–12	Jonas Valančiūnas	C	Lithuania	Lietuvos Rytas	Lithuania	16	28	1.75	
2012–13	Bamba Fall	C	Senegal	Kalev/Cramo	Estonia	16	38	2.38	
2013–14	Shane Lawal	C	Nigeria	Astana	Kazakhstan	18	37	2.06	
2014–15	Anthony Randolph	PF	United States	Lokomotiv-Kuban	Russia	23	46	2.00	
2015–16	Ekene Ibekwe	C	Nigeria	Krasny Oktyabr	Russia	17	25	1.47	
2016–17	Mickell Gladness	C	United States	Kalev/Cramo	Estonia	24	37	1.54	
2017–18	Stéphane Lasme	C	Gabon	UNICS	Russia	22	39	1.77	
2018–19	Reggie Lynch	C	United States	Kalev/Cramo	Estonia	26	56	2.15	
