= VTB United League Defensive Player of the Year =

The VTB United League Defensive Player of the Year is an annual VTB United League award given since the 2013–14 VTB United League season to the league's best defender.

== Winners ==
Key
| Player (X) | Name of the player and number of times they had won the award at that point (if more than one) |
| † | Indicates multiple award winners in the same season |
| § | Denotes the club were the league champions in the same season |

| Season | Player | Pos. | Nationality | Team | Ref(s) |
|---|---|---|---|---|---|
| 2013–14 | Sasha Kaun | C | Russia | CSKA Moscow^{§} | |
| 2014–15 | Andrey Vorontsevich | PF | Russia | CSKA Moscow^{§} | |
| 2015–16 | Kyle Hines | C | United States | CSKA Moscow^{§} | |
| 2016–17 | Nikita Kurbanov | SF | Russia | CSKA Moscow^{§} | |
| 2017–18 | Dmitry Kulagin | SG | Russia | Lokomotiv Kuban | |
| 2018–19 | Maurice Ndour | PF | Senegal | UNICS | |
| 2019–20 | Not awarded ^{1} | | | | |
| 2020–21 | John Brown | F | United States | UNICS | |
| 2021–22 | Jordan Mickey | C / PF | United States | Zenit Saint Petersburg^{§} | |
| 2022–23 | Evgeny Baburin | SG | Russia | Pari Nizhny Novgorod | |
| 2023–24 | Vince Hunter | C | United States | Zenit Saint Petersburg | |
| 2024–25 | Antonius Cleveland | SF | United States | Lokomotiv Kuban | |
| 2025–26 | Georgy Zhbanov | SG | Russia | Zenit Saint Petersburg | |

Notes:

^1 There was no awarding in the 2019–20, because the season was cancelled due to the coronavirus pandemic in Europe.
