= Vitaly Fridzon =

Russian basketball player

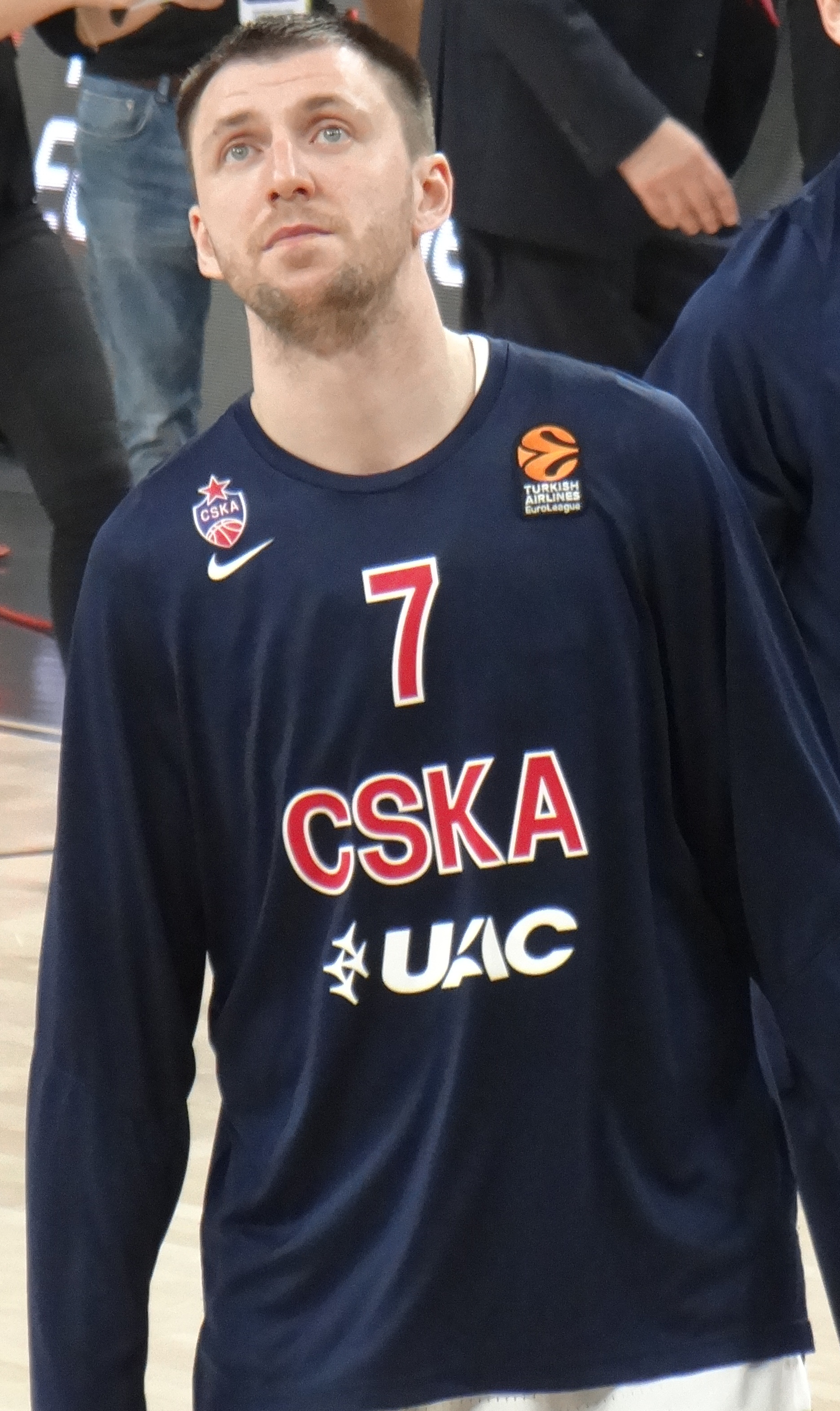
- Fridzon, in 2017.

Personal information
- Born: October 14, 1985 (age 41) Klintsy, Russian SFSR, Soviet Union
- Listed height: 195 cm (6 ft 5 in)
- Listed weight: 81 kg (179 lb)

Career information
- NBA draft: 2007: undrafted
- Playing career: 2001–2024
- Position: Shooting guard
- Number: 7, 77

Career history
- 2001–2004: Standart Toliatti
- 2004–2013: Khimki
- 2013–2018: CSKA Moscow
- 2018–2020: Lokomotiv Kuban
- 2020–2023: Zenit Saint Petersburg
- 2023–2024: Avtodor

Career highlights
- EuroLeague champion (2016); FIBA EuroStar (2007); EuroCup champion (2012); 7× VTB League champion (2011, 2014–2017, 2018, 2022); VTB United League Final Four MVP (2011); Russian League All-Symbolic Second Team (2012); Russian Cup winner (2008); 2× All-VTB United League First Team (2010, 2013); 2× VTB United League All-Star Three-point contest champion (2019, 2020); 2× Russian League All-Star (2007, 2011); Best Russian Young Player (2005); Medal of the Order For Merit (2012); Honored Master of Sports of Russia (2012)
Medals
Men's basketball
Representing Russia
Summer Olympic Games
Bronze medal – third place	2012 London	{{{2}}}
EuroBasket
Bronze medal – third place	2011 Lithuania	{{{2}}}

Vitaly Valeryevich Fridzon (Russian: Виталий Валерьевич Фридзон, born October 14, 1985) is a Russian former professional basketball player. He represented the senior Russian national basketball team. Standing at 1.95 m (6 ft 4 3/4 in), he mainly played at the shooting guard position, but he could also play at the point guard position.

== Professional career ==
=== Early years ===
Fridzon started his professional career in the Russian team Standart Toliatti, in 2001, and stayed with them until the end of the 2003–04 season.

=== Khimki Moscow Region ===
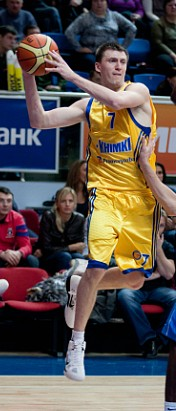
Fridzon playing with Khimki

Fridzon then moved to the prominent Moscow-based team Khimki. With Khimki, he won the Russian Cup in 2007, and the VTB United League championship in 2011, while also being the VTB United League Final Four MVP. A year later, he won the EuroCup 2011–12 season championship, the second-tier level European continental championship, thus giving his team a spot in the upcoming EuroLeague 2012–13 season, after a year of absence from that competition. In the 2012–13 season, he averaged a career-high 11.4 points and 2.2 rebounds per game, in 24 EuroLeague games. However, Khimki didn't win any trophies that season.

=== CSKA Moscow ===
On June 13, 2013, Fridzon signed a two-year contract, with the option for a third season, with the Russian team CSKA Moscow. In his first season with CSKA, in the EuroLeague 2012–13 season, he averaged 7.5 points, 1.5 rebounds, and 1.1 assists per game, over 31 games.

In the 2014–15 season, CSKA Moscow managed to advance to the EuroLeague Final Four, for the fourth straight season, after eliminating Panathinaikos for the second straight season. in the quarterfinals series, with a 3–1 series win. However, in the EuroLeague semifinal game, despite being dubbed by media as an absolute favorite to advance, CSKA once again lost to Olympiacos. The final score was 70–68, after a great Olympiacos comeback in 4th quarter, led by Vassilis Spanoulis. CSKA Moscow eventually won the EuroLeague third place game, after defeating Fenerbahçe, by a score of 86–80. Fridzon had nearly the same season, statistically speaking, like his first season with the club, averaging 7.8 points, 2.3 rebounds, and 1.4 assists per game, over 23 games played in the EuroLeague. CSKA Moscow finished the season by winning the VTB United League season, after eliminating Khimki, with a 3–0 sweep in the league's finals series.

On June 16, 2016, he re-signed with the team, on a new two-year contract, with the option of another season.

On July 25, 2018, Fridzon and CSKA officially part ways after five seasons.

=== Lokomotiv Kuban ===
On July 25, 2018, Fridzon signed a two-year contract with the Russian club Lokomotiv Kuban.

=== Zenit Saint Petersburg ===
On July 18, 2020, Fridzon moved to Zenit Saint Petersburg on a one-year contract, marking his return to the EuroLeague. On June 3, 2021, Zenit announced that Fridzon's contract would not be renewed, making him a free agent once more.

On March 5, 2022, he has signed and joined back the team.

== National team career ==
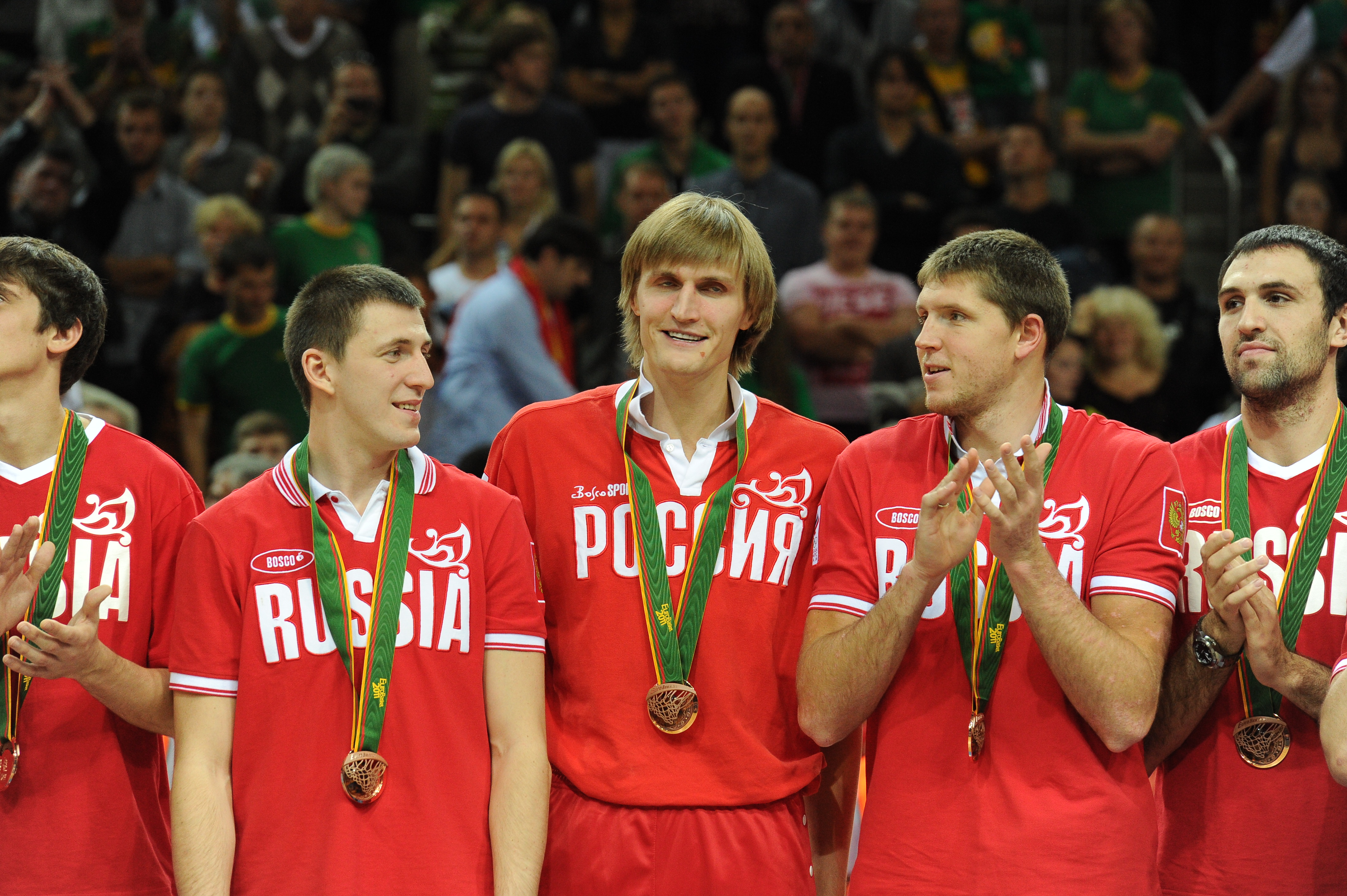
Fridzon with the Russian national team at the EuroBasket 2011.

Fridzon is also a member of the senior Russian national basketball team. He won a bronze medal at the EuroBasket 2011, and a bronze medal at the 2012 Summer Olympics.

== Career statistics ==
Legend
GP	Games played	GS	Games started	MPG	Minutes per game
FG%	Field-goal percentage	3P%	3-point field-goal percentage	FT%	Free-throw percentage
RPG	Rebounds per game	APG	Assists per game	SPG	Steals per game
BPG	Blocks per game	PPG	Points per game	PIR	Performance index rating
**Bold**	Career high

=== EuroLeague ===
†	Denotes season in which Fridzon won the EuroLeague
*	Led the league

Year	Team	GP	GS	MPG	FG%	3P%	FT%	RPG	APG	SPG	BPG	PPG	PIR
2009–10	Khimki	16	2	19.0	.375	.327	**.964***	2.4	2.0	.4	.1	6.5	5.9
2010–11	Khimki	9	7	22.5	.328	.313	.759	**4.1**	1.4	.7	.1	8.2	7.3
2012–13	Khimki	24	5	**24.0**	.450	.432	.813	2.5	**2.2**	**1.0**	.1	**11.4**	**9.1**
2013–14	CSKA Moscow	31*	7	17.8	**.520**	**.500**	.853	1.5	1.1	.5	.1	7.5	6.7
2014–15	CSKA Moscow	23	**18**	18.3	.417	.423	.872	2.3	1.4	.7	.1	7.8	6.3
2015–16†	CSKA Moscow	27	14	13.9	.475	.429	.833	1.7	.9	.6	.0	6.4	5.3
2016–17	CSKA Moscow	**35**	6	12.9	.511	.417	.860	1.2	.8	.6	**.3**	5.9	5.0
2017–18	CSKA Moscow	30	0	7.6	.372	.382	.882	.7	.4	.3	.1	2.9	0.9
2020–21	Zenit	30	3	5.4	.419	.313	.833	.6	.3	.2	—	1.2	0.6
Career		225	62	14.6	.446	.416	.850	1.6	1.0	.5	.1	6.1	4.9
