= Andrey Vorontsevich =

Russian basketball player (born 1987)

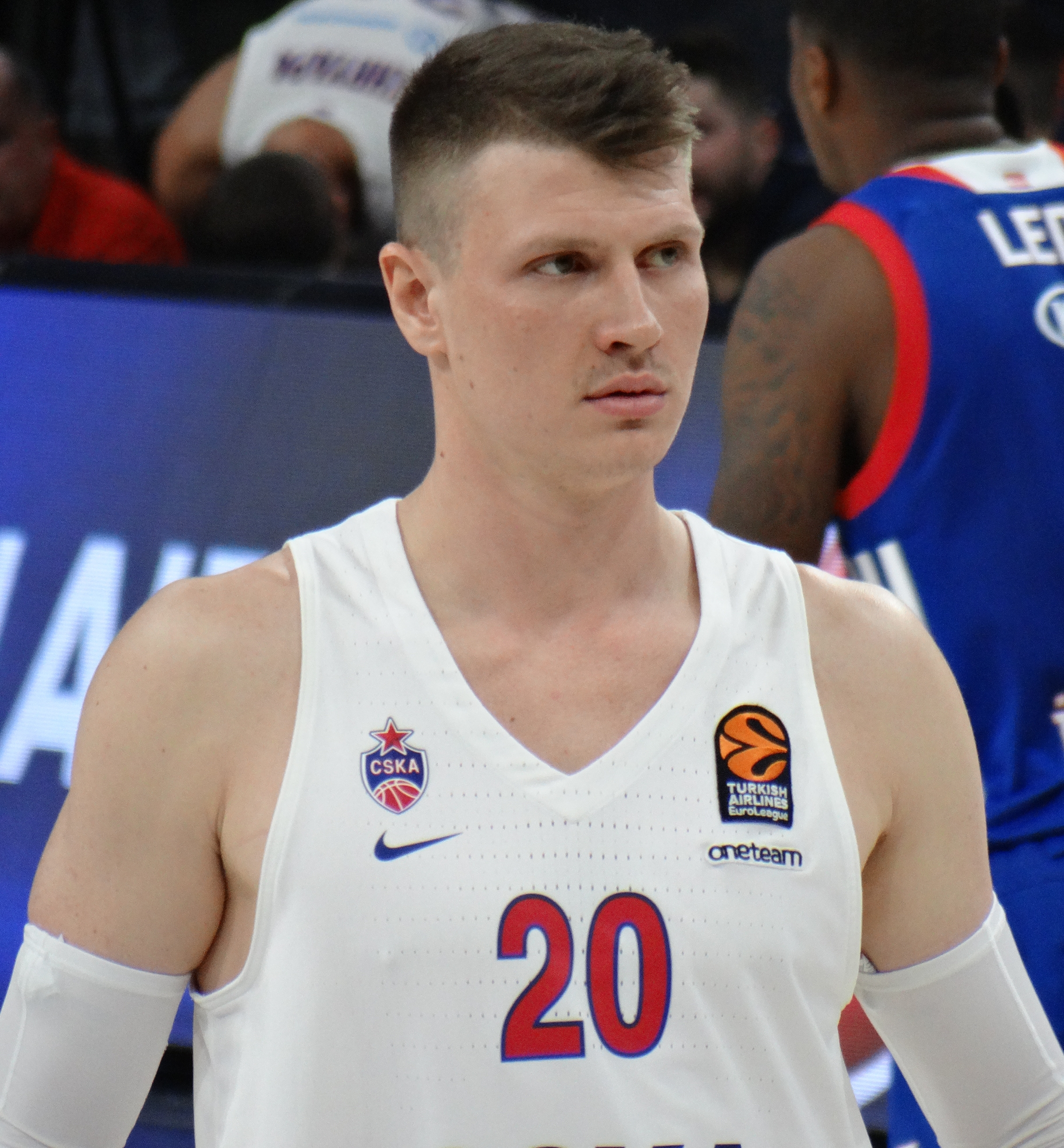
- Vorontsevich with CSKA Moscow in 2017

No. 33 – Zenit Saint Petersburg
- Position: Power forward
- League: VTB United League

Personal information
- Born: July 17, 1987 (age 39) Omsk, Russian SFSR, Soviet Union
- Listed height: 207 cm (6 ft 9 in)
- Listed weight: 107 kg (236 lb)

Career information
- NBA draft: 2009: undrafted
- Playing career: 2004–present

Career history
- 2004–2006: Lokomotiv Novosibirsk
- 2006–2020: CSKA Moscow
- 2021: Nizhny Novgorod
- 2021–2023: UNICS Kazan
- 2023–2024: Nizhny Novgorod
- 2024: →UNICS Kazan
- 2024–present: Zenit Saint Petersburg

Career highlights
- 3× EuroLeague champion (2008, 2016, 2019); VTB United League Promo-Cup champion (2008); 10× VTB United League champion (2010, 2012–2019, 2023); VTB United League Playoffs MVP (2015); VTB United League Defensive Player of the Year (2015); All-VTB United League Second Team (2015); VTB United League All-Star (2017); 7× Russian League champion (2007–2013); 2× Russian Cup winner (2007, 2010); Russian League All-Star (2011); Best Russian Young Player (2007)
Medals
Men's basketball
Representing Russia
EuroBasket
| Bronze medal – third place | 2011 Lithuania |

Andrey Konstantinovich Vorontsevich (Russian: Андрей Константинович Воронцевич, born July 17, 1987) is a Russian professional basketball player for the Russian team Zenit Saint Petersburg of the VTB United League. He plays at the power forward position.

== Professional career ==
Vorontsevich made his professional debut with Lokomotiv Novosibirsk during the 2005–06 season. He moved to CSKA Moscow, before the 2006–07 season. He was named the Best Russian Young Player, in 2007. In the 2014–15 season, he was named the VTB United League Defensive Player of the Year, and the VTB United League Playoffs MVP.

On July 1, 2020, after 14 seasons, Vorontsevich and CSKA parted ways.

On March 3, 2021, he signed with Nizhny Novgorod of the VTB United League.

On July 9, 2021, he signed with the Russian team UNICS Kazan.

== National team career ==
=== Russian junior national team ===
Vorontsevich was a member of the junior national teams of Russia. With Russia's junior teams, he played at the 2006 FIBA Europe Under-20 Championship, and at the 2007 FIBA Europe Under-20 Championship.

=== Russian senior national team ===
Vorontsevich has been a member of the senior Russian national basketball team. With Russia's senior national team, he played at the 2008 Summer Olympics, the EuroBasket 2009, the 2010 FIBA World Championship, the EuroBasket 2015, and the EuroBasket 2017. He also won a bronze medal at the EuroBasket 2011.

== Career statistics ==
Legend
| GP | Games played | GS | Games started | MPG | Minutes per game |
| FG% | Field-goal percentage | 3P% | 3-point field-goal percentage | FT% | Free-throw percentage |
| RPG | Rebounds per game | APG | Assists per game | SPG | Steals per game |
| BPG | Blocks per game | PPG | Points per game | PIR | Performance index rating |
| **Bold** | Career high |

=== EuroLeague ===
| † | Denotes seasons in which Vorontsevich won the EuroLeague |
| * | Led the league |

| Year | Team | GP | GS | MPG | FG% | 3P% | FT% | RPG | APG | SPG | BPG | PPG | PIR |
|---|---|---|---|---|---|---|---|---|---|---|---|---|---|
| 2006–07 | CSKA Moscow | 6 | 0 | 3.0 | .250 | .000 | **1.000** | .3 | — | — | — | 0.5 | -0.8 |
| 2007–08† | CSKA Moscow | 9 | 0 | 10.1 | .500 | .333 | .750 | 1.8 | — | .1 | .3 | 2.7 | 2.7 |
| 2008–09 | CSKA Moscow | 6 | 0 | 2.8 | .500 | **1.000** | .000 | .7 | — | — | — | 1.2 | .6 |
| 2009–10 | CSKA Moscow | 20 | 1 | 12.7 | .460 | .310 | .793 | 2.1 | .6 | .4 | .2 | 5.0 | 5.2 |
| 2010–11 | CSKA Moscow | 10 | 4 | 23.9 | **.550** | .571 | .692 | 4.3 | 1.1 | .6 | .4 | **10.5** | 11.0 |
| 2011–12 | CSKA Moscow | 20 | 2 | 16.3 | .459 | .327 | .636 | 2.7 | 1.0 | .5 | .4 | 5.8 | 5.9 |
| 2012–13 | CSKA Moscow | 16 | 1 | 12.0 | .548 | .417 | .929 | 3.6 | .4 | .4 | .1 | 4.0 | 6.5 |
| 2013–14 | CSKA Moscow | 25 | 7 | 15.7 | .513 | .400 | .818 | 3.1 | 1.0 | .4 | .2 | 4.6 | 6.5 |
| 2014–15 | CSKA Moscow | 30* | **30*** | **25.7** | .447 | .370 | .760 | **5.7** | **2.2** | .6 | **.9** | 8.4 | **11.9** |
| 2015–16† | CSKA Moscow | 28 | 23 | 24.3 | .447 | .445 | .686 | 4.2 | 1.4 | **.8** | .6 | 8.5 | 9.4 |
| 2016–17 | CSKA Moscow | **35** | 21 | 19.5 | .506 | .477 | .520 | 2.9 | .9 | .5 | .1 | 7.3 | 7.3 |
| 2017–18 | CSKA Moscow | 30 | 9 | 15.0 | .448 | .397 | .786 | 2.4 | .7 | .2 | .5 | 4.7 | 4.9 |
| 2018–19† | CSKA Moscow | 19 | 4 | 10.1 | .261 | .303 | **1.000** | 1.6 | .7 | .3 | .2 | 2.2 | 2.1 |
| 2019–20 | CSKA Moscow | 20 | 3 | 13.6 | .365 | .286 | .500 | 3.0 | .1 | .5 | .3 | 3.6 | 4.0 |
| 2021–22 | UNICS | 19 | 14 | 19.6 | .422 | .382 | .615 | 2.6 | 1.1 | .3 | .3 | 5.5 | 5.2 |
| Career | | 293 | 119 | 16.9 | .458 | .400 | .725 | 3.1 | 1.0 | .4 | .4 | 5.6 | 6.4 |
