= Sergio Rodríguez =

Spanish basketball player (born 1986)

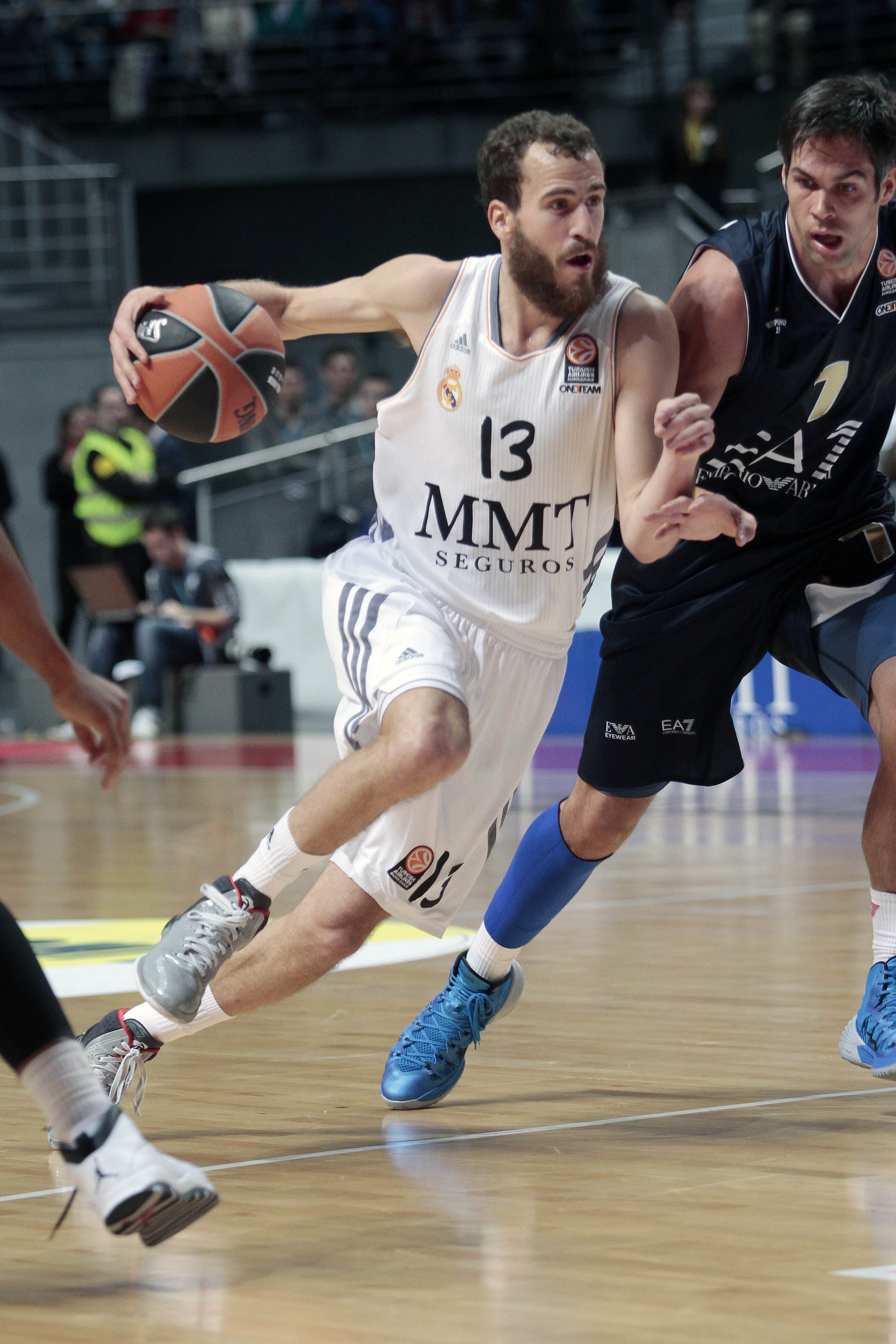
- Rodríguez with Real Madrid in 2013

Personal information
- Born: 12 June 1986 (age 40) Santa Cruz, Tenerife, Spain
- Listed height: 1.91 m (6 ft 3 in)
- Listed weight: 84 kg (185 lb)

Career information
- NBA draft: 2006: 1st round, 27th overall pick
- Drafted by: Phoenix Suns
- Playing career: 2003–2024
- Position: Point guard
- Number: 13, 6, 11, 14

Career history
- 2003–2006: Estudiantes
- 2006–2009: Portland Trail Blazers
- 2009–2010: Sacramento Kings
- 2010: New York Knicks
- 2010–2016: Real Madrid
- 2016–2017: Philadelphia 76ers
- 2017–2019: CSKA Moscow
- 2019–2022: Olimpia Milano
- 2022–2024: Real Madrid

Career highlights
- 3× EuroLeague champion (2015, 2019, 2023); EuroLeague MVP (2014); All-EuroLeague First Team (2014); All-EuroLeague Second Team (2018); EuroLeague 25th Anniversary Team (2025); FIBA Intercontinental Cup champion (2015); 4× Liga ACB champion (2013, 2015, 2016, 2024); 3× Russian League champion (2017–2019); 2× VTB United League champion (2018, 2019); Lega Serie A champion (2022); 2× Italian Cup winner (2021, 2022); 5× Spanish Cup winner (2012, 2014–2016, 2024); 5× Spanish Supercup winner (2012–2014, 2022, 2023); Italian Super Cup winner (2020); VTB United League Final Four MVP (2018); 3× All-Liga ACB First Team (2013, 2014, 2016); 2× Liga ACB assists leader (2014, 2016); Liga ACB Most Spectacular Player (2014); Liga ACB Rising Star (2005); Spanish Supercup MVP (2013); 2× VTB United League All-Star (2018, 2019); FIBA Europe Under-18 Championship MVP (2004)
- Stats at NBA.com
- Stats at Basketball Reference
Medals
Men's basketball
Representing Spain
Olympic Games
Silver medal – second place	2012 London	Team
Bronze medal – third place	2016 Rio de Janeiro	Team
FIBA World Cup
Gold medal – first place	2006 Japan
EuroBasket
Gold medal – first place	2015 France–Croatia–Germany–Latvia
Silver medal – second place	2007 Spain
Bronze medal – third place	2013 Slovenia
Bronze medal – third place	2017 Finland–Israel–Romania–Turkey
FIBA Europe Under-18 Championship
Gold medal – first place	2004 Spain	Team

Sergio Rodríguez Gómez (Spanish pronunciation: [ˈseɾxjo roˈðɾiɣeθ]; born 12 June 1986) is a Spanish former professional basketball player who played for 21 seasons, most notably in the EuroLeague, and for Real Madrid in the Spanish Liga ACB, but also had two short stints in the National Basketball Association (NBA). Standing at 1.91 m (6 ft 3 in), he played at the point guard position. Rodriguez, nicknamed "El Chacho", won the EuroLeague title in 2015, and was an All-EuroLeague First Team selection, as well as the EuroLeague MVP the year before.

Rodríguez was a regular member of the senior Spain national team, with whom he won a FIBA World Cup title in 2006, an Olympics silver medal in 2012, as well as a bronze medal at the 2016 Summer Olympics. He also won a EuroBasket title in 2015, a silver medal in 2007, and a bronze medal in 2013. He earned an All-EuroBasket Team selection in 2015.

== Professional career ==
=== Estudiantes (2003–2006) ===
Prior to joining the Portland Trail Blazers, Rodríguez was chosen to play for the 2004 World Junior Select team to play against the best high school players at the Nike Hoop Summit, located in the United States. Before joining the NBA, Rodríguez also played professional basketball at the senior club level for Estudiantes of the Spanish League, in which he played a final against FC Barcelona in the 2003–04 season, and won the ACB Rising Star Award for the 2004–05 season.

=== Portland Trail Blazers (2006–2009) ===
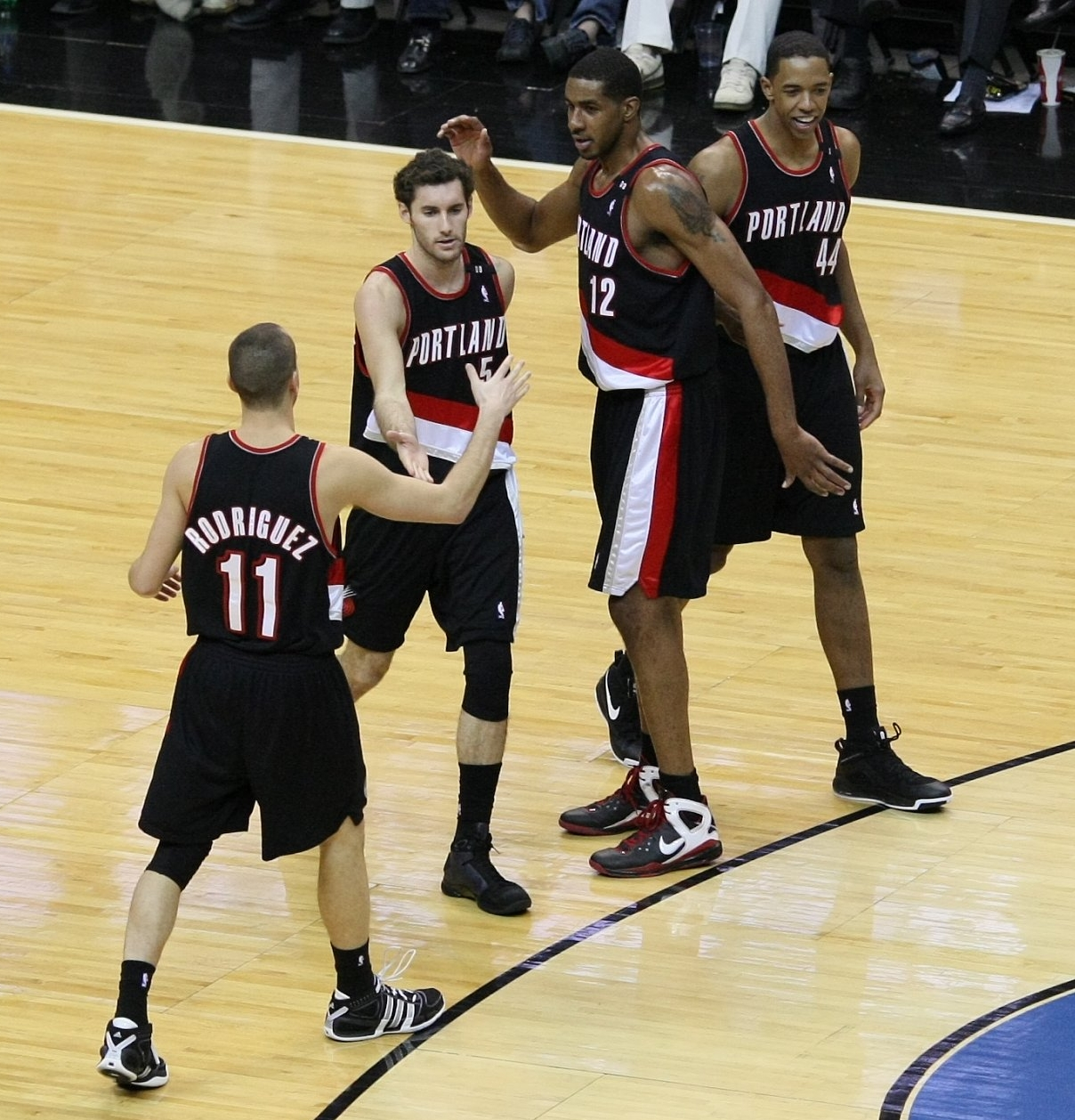
Rodríguez with Trail Blazers' teammates Rudy Fernández, LaMarcus Aldridge and Channing Frye in January 2008

Rodríguez was selected with the 27th pick in the first round, by the Phoenix Suns, in the 2006 NBA draft (and later that day traded to the Portland Trail Blazers in exchange for cash considerations). On July 20, 2006, it was announced that the Trail Blazers had negotiated a buyout with his Spanish League club Estudiantes, and signed him to an NBA rookie-scale contract.

Throughout his spell at Portland, he did not earn much playing time, primarily playing as back-up point-guard. He was sidelined by the likes of Jarrett Jack or Steve Blake, who were favoured by coach Nate McMillan. He developed great court chemistry with fellow Spaniard Rudy Fernández.

Rodríguez did not get along with McMillan, who had had a profile of low-risk point guard in his playing career. In the view of Rodríguez, McMillan was more "unjust than just" towards him, although—conveying a mixed balance—he pointed out that McMillan still gave him some opportunities after the arrival of highly touted prospect Jerryd Bayless. Retrospectively, McMillan shared the opinion that Rodríguez had entered the NBA "too young", allegedly undeveloped as player.

=== Sacramento Kings and New York Knicks (2009–2010) ===
On June 25, 2009, Rodríguez was traded, along with the 37th pick in the 2009 NBA draft, and cash considerations, to the Sacramento Kings for the 31st pick in the 2009 NBA draft. In 39 games played for the Kings, he averaged 6 points and 3.1 assists per game.

On February 18, 2010, Rodríguez was traded to the New York Knicks, along with Tracy McGrady, in a 3-team trade deal. He appeared in 27 games for the Knicks, averaging 7.4 points and 3.4 assists per game.

=== Real Madrid (2010–2016) ===
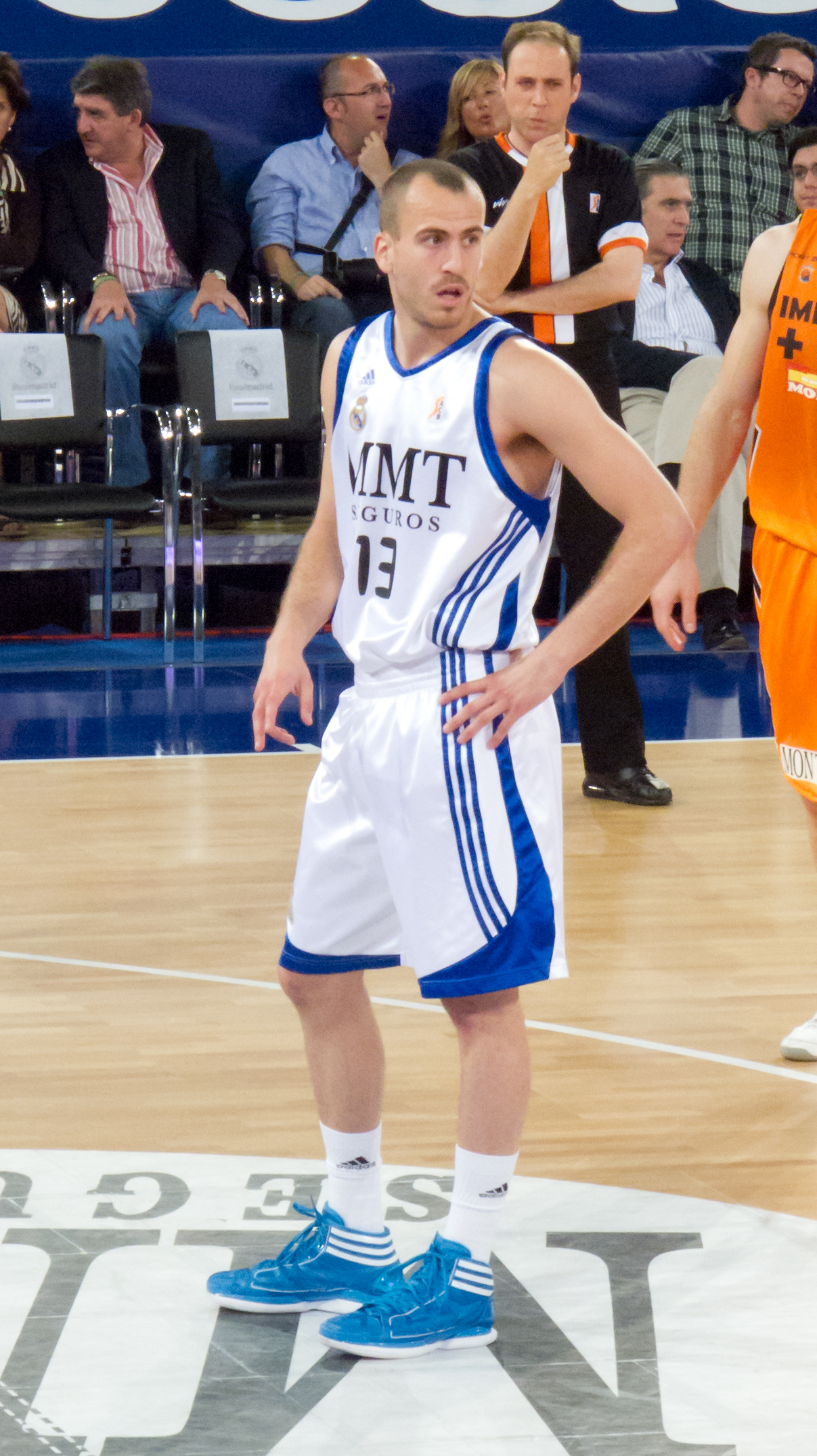
Rodríguez with Real Madrid in May 2011

On July 5, 2010, after spending four seasons in the NBA, Rodríguez signed a 3-year contract with the Spanish team Real Madrid. In July 2012, he signed a 2-year contract extension with Real Madrid, extending his contract through the 2014–15 season.

On January 9, 2014, he signed an extension with Real Madrid, staying in the club until 2018. In May 2014, alongside his teammate Rudy Fernández, he was named to the All-EuroLeague First Team of the EuroLeague. Prior to the 2014 Final Four, he was named the EuroLeague MVP of the season, after averaging 14 points, 4.9 assists, and 2 rebounds per game, over 31 games played, despite not starting in any game.

In the 2014–15 season, Real Madrid won the EuroLeague, after defeating Olympiacos, by a score of 78–59 in the 2015 finals game. Real Madrid eventually finished the season by also winning the season's Spanish League championship, after a 3–0 series sweep in the Spanish League's final series against Barcelona. With that title win, Real Madrid won the triple crown.

=== Philadelphia 76ers (2016–2017) ===
On 13 July 2016, Rodríguez signed with the Philadelphia 76ers. He made his debut for the 76ers in their season opener on 26 October 2016, recording 12 points and nine assists in a 103–97 loss to the Oklahoma City Thunder. On April 8, 2017, Rodriguez was ruled out for the final three games of the season due to knee soreness after playing 68 games and starting a career high 30 games for the franchise.

=== CSKA Moscow (2017–2019) ===
On July 17, 2017, Rodríguez signed with CSKA Moscow. In May 2018, he was named the All-EuroLeague Second Team for the 2017–18 season.

=== Olimpia Milano (2019–2022) ===
On July 12, 2019, Rodriguez signed a three-year deal with the Italian basketball team, Pallacanestro Olimpia Milano. In his first game with Milano, Rodriguez recorded 21 points and 4 assists in a 75–53 win over the De' Longhi Treviso. On July 2, 2022, Rodriguez amicably parted ways with the Italian club after three seasons, having also served as the team's captain.

=== Return to Real Madrid (2022–2024) ===
On 18 July 2022, Rodriguez returned to Real Madrid on a one-year deal. On 19 June 2024, Rodríguez announced his retirement from professional basketball.

== National team career ==
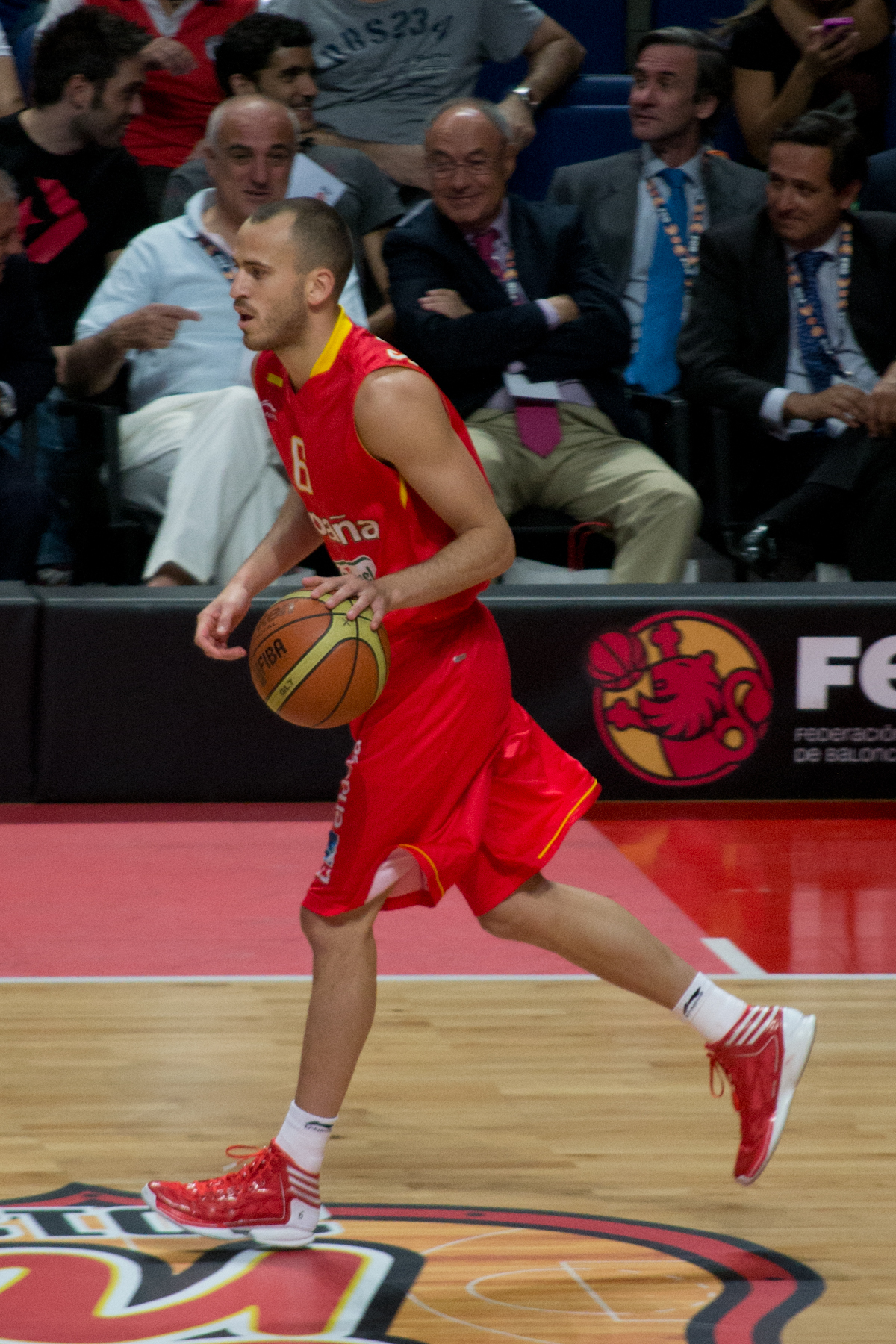
Rodríguez with the Spain national team in 2012

Thought to be one of the best European prospects of his age, Rodríguez was named the MVP of the 2004 FIBA Europe Under-18 Championship, which was held in Zaragoza, Spain, while playing with the Spain national junior team. He led the host Spanish team to the tournament's gold medal. In the eight games of that tournament, he averaged 19 points per game, 4.6 rebounds per game, 8.5 assists per game, and 2.1 steals per game.

In August 2006, Rodríguez won the gold medal at the 2006 FIBA World Championship, while playing with the senior men's Spain national team. He also won the silver medal with Spain's senior national team at the EuroBasket 2007. In 2012, he won a silver medal at the Summer Olympics in London. In 2016, he won a bronze medal at the Summer Olympic Games in Rio de Janeiro.

Rodríguez decided to skip the 2019 World Cup, citing a need to rest. He was called up by Sergio Scariolo for the 2020 Summer Olympics, celebrated in 2021.

== Player profile ==
Possessing a knack for pick and roll plays, Rodríguez was known for feeding his teammates with alley-oops and creative passing. His style of play has drawn comparisons to former NBA player Jason Williams. He maintained a high assist-to-turnover ratio and also excelled as scorer, posting high 3-point and free-throw percentages throughout his career.

== Post-retirement ==
Rodríguez was appointed sporting director of basketball at Real Madrid in July 2025. He stepped down from his position in June 2026 following a trophyless season.

== Career statistics ==
Legend
GP	Games played	GS	Games started	MPG	Minutes per game
FG%	Field-goal percentage	3P%	3-point field-goal percentage	FT%	Free-throw percentage
RPG	Rebounds per game	APG	Assists per game	SPG	Steals per game
BPG	Blocks per game	PPG	Points per game	PIR	Performance index rating
**Bold**	Career high

=== NBA ===
==== Regular season ====
Year	Team	GP	GS	MPG	FG%	3P%	FT%	RPG	APG	SPG	BPG	PPG
2006–07	Portland	67	1	12.9	.423	.282	**.808**	1.4	3.3	.5	.0	3.7
2007–08	Portland	72	0	8.7	.352	.293	.658	.8	1.7	.3	.0	2.5
2008–09	Portland	**80**	13	15.3	.392	.325	.792	1.6	3.6	.7	.0	4.5
2009–10	Sacramento	39	0	13.3	.463	.357	.694	1.3	3.1	.7	.1	6.0
2009–10	New York	27	8	19.7	**.491**	.347	.806	1.4	3.4	**.8**	.1	7.4
2016–17	Philadelphia	68	**30**	**22.3**	.392	**.365**	.667	**2.3**	**5.1**	.7	.1	**7.8**
Career		353	52	15.0	.409	.337	.739	1.5	3.4	.6	.0	4.9

==== Playoffs ====
Year	Team	GP	GS	MPG	FG%	3P%	FT%	RPG	APG	SPG	BPG	PPG
2009	Portland	5	0	5.4	.333	.000	.000	.6	1.4	.0	.2	.8
Career		5	0	5.4	.333	.000	.000	.6	1.4	.0	.2	.8

=== EuroLeague ===
†	Denotes season in which Rodríguez won the EuroLeague
*	Led the league

Year	Team	GP	GS	MPG	FG%	3P%	FT%	RPG	APG	SPG	BPG	PPG	PIR
2004–05	Estudiantes	14	5	17.4	.419	.318	.636	1.9	2.8	**1.2**	—	6.4	5.7
2010–11	Real Madrid	18	10	18.8	.413	.200	.938	1.9	3.1	.5	—	6.1	6.2
2011–12	Real Madrid	16	5	20.1	.494	.469	.821	1.5	5.4	.8	—	7.4	9.9
2012–13	Real Madrid	29	4	18.2	.374	.295	.875	1.8	3.9	.7	—	7.5	7.2
2013–14	Real Madrid	31*	0	22.5	**.498**	**.500**	.906	2.0	4.9	**1.2**	**.1**	**14.0**	**15.9**
2014–15†	Real Madrid	28	2	21.6	.438	.381	.836	1.4	5.1	1.0	.0	11.1	12.1
2015–16	Real Madrid	27	10	23.9	.446	.409	.741	2.2	**6.2**	.7	**.1**	10.9	14.0
2017–18	CSKA Moscow	36*	**22**	**26.0**	.491	.438	.897	2.0	4.9	.8	**.1**	13.8	13.8
2018–19†	CSKA Moscow	35	10	21.9	.421	.392	.878	1.5	4.5	.7	**.1**	10.2	9.1
2019–20	Milano	28*	20	25.6	.419	.374	**.961**	**2.3**	5.4	.9	**.1**	13.0	13.7
2020–21	Milano	37	3	19.9	.446	.354	.906	2.0	4.5	.8	**.1**	9.7	10.8
2021–22	Milano	34	5	20.2	.412	.318	.760	**2.3**	4.5	.7	**.1**	8.3	9.1
2022–23†	Real Madrid	**40**	3	14.8	.434	.368	.833	1.5	4.4	.5	—	4.9	6.8
2023–24	Real Madrid	32	0	15.2	.356	.356	.875	1.4	4.3	.5	—	4.4	4.5
Career		405	99	20.5	.437	.384	.853	1.8	4.6	.8	.0	9.3	10.1

=== Domestic leagues ===
Season	Team	League	GP	MPG	FG%	3P%	FT%	RPG	APG	SPG	BPG	PPG
2004–05	Adecco Estudiantes	ACB	34	19.6	.547	.317	.780	1.6	2.9	1.1	.0	8.9
2005–06	Adecco Estudiantes	ACB	34	23.5	.454	.306	.676	2.4	4.9	1.3	.1	9.2
2010–11	Real Madrid	ACB	31	18.9	.418	.333	.854	1.4	2.7	.7	.1	7.0
2011–12	Real Madrid	ACB	34	18.1	.413	.302	.766	1.9	3.8	.7	.1	5.8
2012–13	Real Madrid	ACB	34	18.5	.478	.442	.889	1.9	4.0	1.1	.0	9.1
2013–14	Real Madrid	ACB	34	22.9	.497	.377	.864	1.9	6.1	1.5	.1	12.7
2014–15	Real Madrid	ACB	31	21.7	.404	.388	.825	2.0	5.3	1.1	.0	9.9
2015–16	Real Madrid	ACB	31	24.5	.504	.405	.895	2.0	6.1	.8	.0	12.1

== Awards and accomplishments ==
=== Professional career ===
- 4× Liga ACB (Spanish League) Champion: (2013, 2015, 2016, 2024)
- 5× Copa del Rey (Spanish Cup) winner: (2012, 2014, 2015, 2016, 2024)
- 5× Supercopa de España (Spanish Supercup) winner: (2012, 2013, 2014, 2022, 2023)
- EuroLeague Champion: (2015, 2019, 2023)
- FIBA Intercontinental Cup Champion: (2015)
- Spanish ACB League Rising Star Award: (2005)
- 3× All-Spanish ACB League Team: (2013, 2014, 2016)
- Spanish Supercup MVP: (2013)
- All-EuroLeague First Team: (2014)
- EuroLeague MVP: (2014)
- Spanish ACB League Most Spectacular Player of the Year (KIA Award): (2014)
- Best Spanish ACB League Passer: (2013–14)
- 2× All-Europe Player of the Year: (2014, 2015)
- VTB United League champion: (2018)
- VTB United League Final Four MVP: (2018)

=== Spanish junior national team ===
- 2004 FIBA Europe Under-18 Championship: Gold
- 2004 FIBA Europe Under-18 Championship MVP

=== Spanish senior national team ===
- 2006 FIBA World Championship: Gold
- EuroBasket 2007: Silver
- 2012 Summer Olympics: Silver
- EuroBasket 2013: Bronze
- EuroBasket 2015: Gold
- EuroBasket 2015: All-Tournament Team
- 2016 Summer Olympics: Bronze
