= 2010–11 VTB United League =

VTB United League
- Season: 2010–11
- Duration: 6 October 2010 – 23 April 2011
- Teams: 12

Regular season
- Season MVP: (United States) Ramel Curry

Finals
- Champions: (Russia) Khimki Moscow Region (1st title)
- Runners-up: (Russia) CSKA Moscow
- Final Four MVP: (Russia) Vitaly Fridzon

Statistical leaders
Points	(Finland) Jamar Wilson	18.8

The VTB United League 2010–11 was the second complete season of the VTB United League, which is Eastern Europe's top-tier level men's professional club basketball competition. The tournament featured 12 teams, from 8 countries.

== Teams ==
Country (League)	Teams
Belarus (BPL)	Minsk-2006 Minsk
Estonia (KML)	Kalev Tallinn
Finland (Korisliiga)	Honka Espoo
Latvia (LBL)	VEF Rīga
Lithuania (LKL)	Lietuvos Rytas Vilnius
Lithuania (LKL)	Žalgiris Kaunas
Poland (PLK)	Asseco Prokom Gdynia
Russia (PBL)	CSKA Moscow
Russia (PBL)	Khimki Moscow Region
Russia (PBL)	UNICS Kazan
Ukraine (SuperLeague)	Azovmash Mariupol
Ukraine (SuperLeague)	Dnipro

== Group stage ==
Key to colors
Top two places in each group advance to Final Four
Eliminated

=== Group A ===
Pos	Team	Pld	W	L	PF	PA	PD	CSK	UNI	LRT	MIN	DNI	HON
1	(Russia) CSKA Moscow	10	9	1	765	635	+130		60–67	80–61	82–72	113–73	73–53
2	(Russia) UNICS Kazan	10	9	1	850	671	+179	60–69		66–64	83–54	87–55	95–62
3	(Lithuania) Lietuvos rytas	10	6	4	824	757	+67	63–73	85–87		90–84	116–78	87–67
4	(Belarus) Minsk-2006	10	4	6	768	771	−3	62–75	78–90	78–86		85–74	90–60
5	(Ukraine) Dnipro	10	2	8	721	892	−171	65–74	67–104	69–82	73–79		86–79
6	(Finland) Espoon Honka	10	0	10	663	865	−202	59–66	77–111	75–90	58–86	73–81^{OT}	

=== Group B ===
Pos	Team	Pld	W	L	PF	PA	PD	KHI	AZO	ZAL	PRO	VEF	KAL
1	(Russia) BC Khimki	10	9	1	801	676	+125		65–58	78–76	99–79	81–61	75–50
2	(Ukraine) Azovmash Mariupol	10	7	3	751	718	+33	80–99		75–63	80–76	79–74	76–55
3	(Lithuania) Žalgiris Kaunas	10	7	3	801	741	+60	75–69	75–86		84–79	84–71	101–83
4	(Poland) Asseco Prokom	10	3	7	740	780	−40	57–86	76–85	60–73		103–75	64–58
5	(Latvia) BK VEF Rīga	10	3	7	726	767	−41	75–81	68–60	74–79	63–76		95–55
6	(Estonia) BC Kalev	10	1	9	645	782	−137	65–68	67–72	66–91	77–70	69–70	

== Final four ==
Semifinals; April 22
(Russia) CSKA Moscow	69
(Ukraine) Azovmash Mariupol	57
(Russia) BC Khimki	84
(Russia) UNICS Kazan	78

Final; April 23
(Russia) CSKA Moscow	64
(Russia) BC Khimki	66
Third place
(Ukraine) Azovmash Mariupol	75
(Russia) UNICS Kazan	95

=== Semifinals ===
22 April 2011
17:00

Report

CSKA Moscow (Russia)	69–57	(Ukraine) Azovmash Mariupol
Scoring by quarter: 17–15, 16–16, 21–12, 15–14
Pts: Kaun 16; Rebs: Kaun 7 Asts: Holden, Khryapa 5		Pts: Alexander, Curry 15; Rebs: Owens 10; Asts: Owens 4

Basket-Hall, Kazan
Attendance: 4,000
Referees: Ilija Belošević (SRB), Saša Pukl (SLO), Jakub Zamojski (POL)

22 April 2011
20:00

Report

Khimki Moscow Region (Russia)	84–78	(Russia) UNICS Kazan
Scoring by quarter: 17–15, 21–25, 24–17, 22–21
Pts: Fridzon 27; Rebs: Loncar 6 Asts: Planinić 9		Pts: Rizvić 17; Rebs: Lampe 9 Asts: Popović 7

Basket-Hall, Kazan
Attendance: 6,500
Referees: Volodymyr Drabikovsky (UKR), Oskar Lefwerth (SWE), Anton Makhlin (RUS)

=== Third place game ===
23 April 2011
16:00

Report

Azovmash Mariupol (Ukraine)	75–95	(Russia) UNICS Kazan
Scoring by quarter: 9–27, 26–27, 17–14, 23–27
Pts: three players 15; Rebs: Thomas 8 Asts: Pierce 5		Pts: Minard 24; Rebs: Minard, Veremeenko 7 Asts: three players 4

Basket-Hall, Kazan
Attendance: 5,500
Referees: Ilija Belošević (SRB), Oskar Lefwerth (SWE), Jakub Zamojski (POL)

=== Final ===
23 April 2011
18:30

Report

CSKA Moscow (Russia)	64–66	(Russia) Khimki Moscow Region
Scoring by quarter: 6–17, 21–16, 20–13, 17–20
Pts: Gordon, Holden 15; Rebs: Vorontsevich 6 Asts: Shved 5		Pts: Lončar 18; Rebs: Fridzon 7 Asts: Papadopoulos 3

Basket-Hall, Kazan
Attendance: 5,500
Referees: Volodymyr Drabikovsky (UKR), Saša Pukl (SLO), Tomas Jasevičius (LTU)

== Awards ==
=== All-Tournament Team ===
- Ramel Curry (Azovmash Mariupol)
- Maciej Lampe (UNICS Kazan)
- Keith Langford (Khimki Moscow Region)
- Marko Popović (UNICS Kazan)
- Martynas Gecevičius (Lietuvos Rytas)

=== All-Final Four Team ===
- Vitaly Fridzon (Khimki Moscow Region)
- Alexey Shved (CSKA Moscow)
- Kelly McCarty (UNICS Kazan)
- Victor Khryapa (CSKA Moscow)
- Krešimir Lončar (Khimki Moscow Region)

=== MVPs ===
Regular Season MVP		Final Four MVP	
MVP	Team	MVP	Team
(United States) Ramel Curry	(Ukraine) Azovmash Mariupol	(Russia) Vitaly Fridzon	(Russia) Khimki Moscow Region
