= VTB United League Playoffs MVP =

The VTB United League Final Four MVP is an annual award that is given to the best player of the final four of the VTB United League competition. The award has been given out since the league began. Previously, the award was also known as the VTB United League Playoffs MVP.

== Winners ==
From 2008 until 2012, and since 2018, the league ends with a final four style format. In a weekend, single-elimination games are played in the semi-finals, finals and third place game. The player who played the best during the tournament receives the award.

From 2012 until 2017, the league champions were decided through a playoff format. The Playoffs MVP was awarded to the best player within these playoff series.

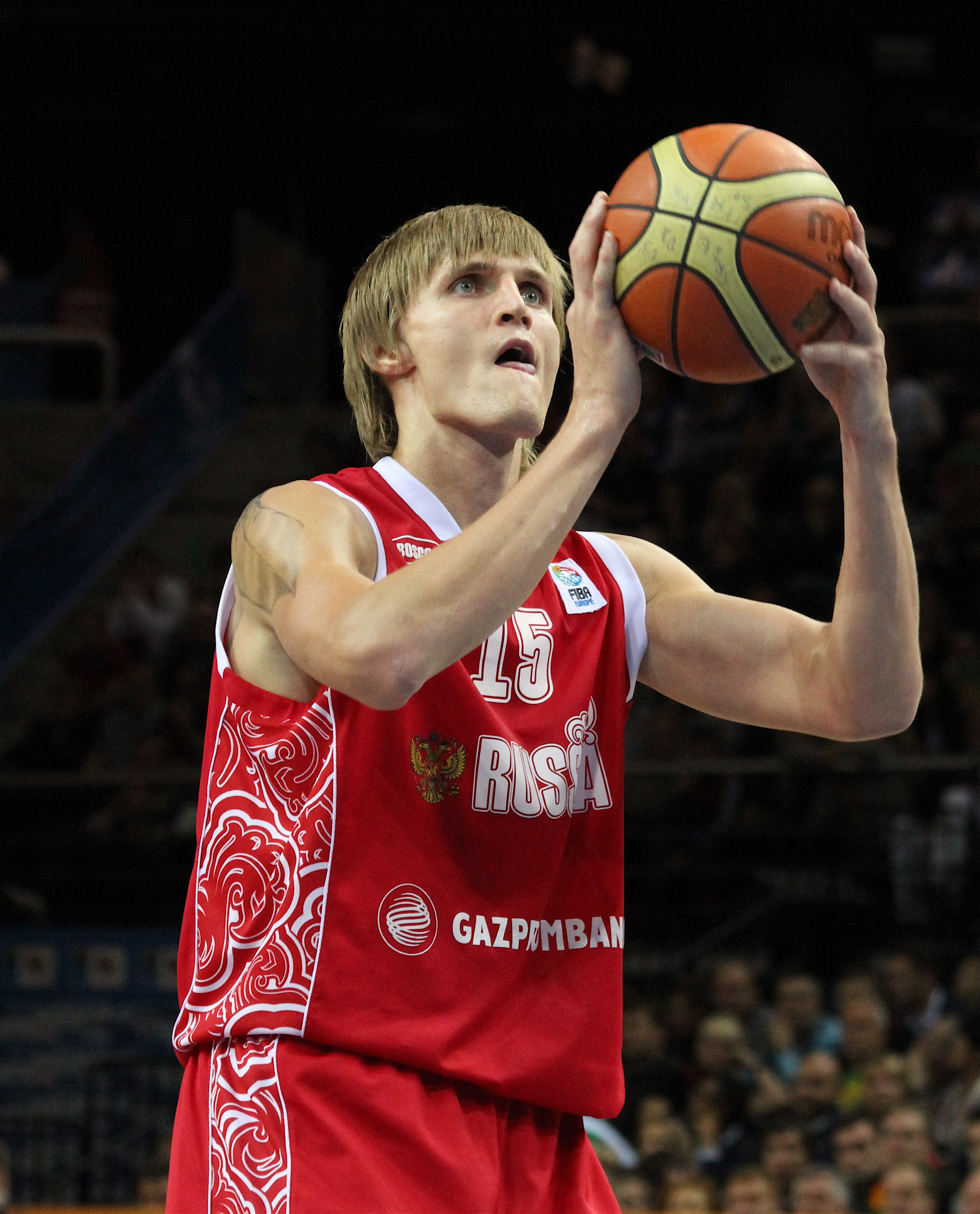
Andrei Kirilenko was the Final Four MVP in 2012

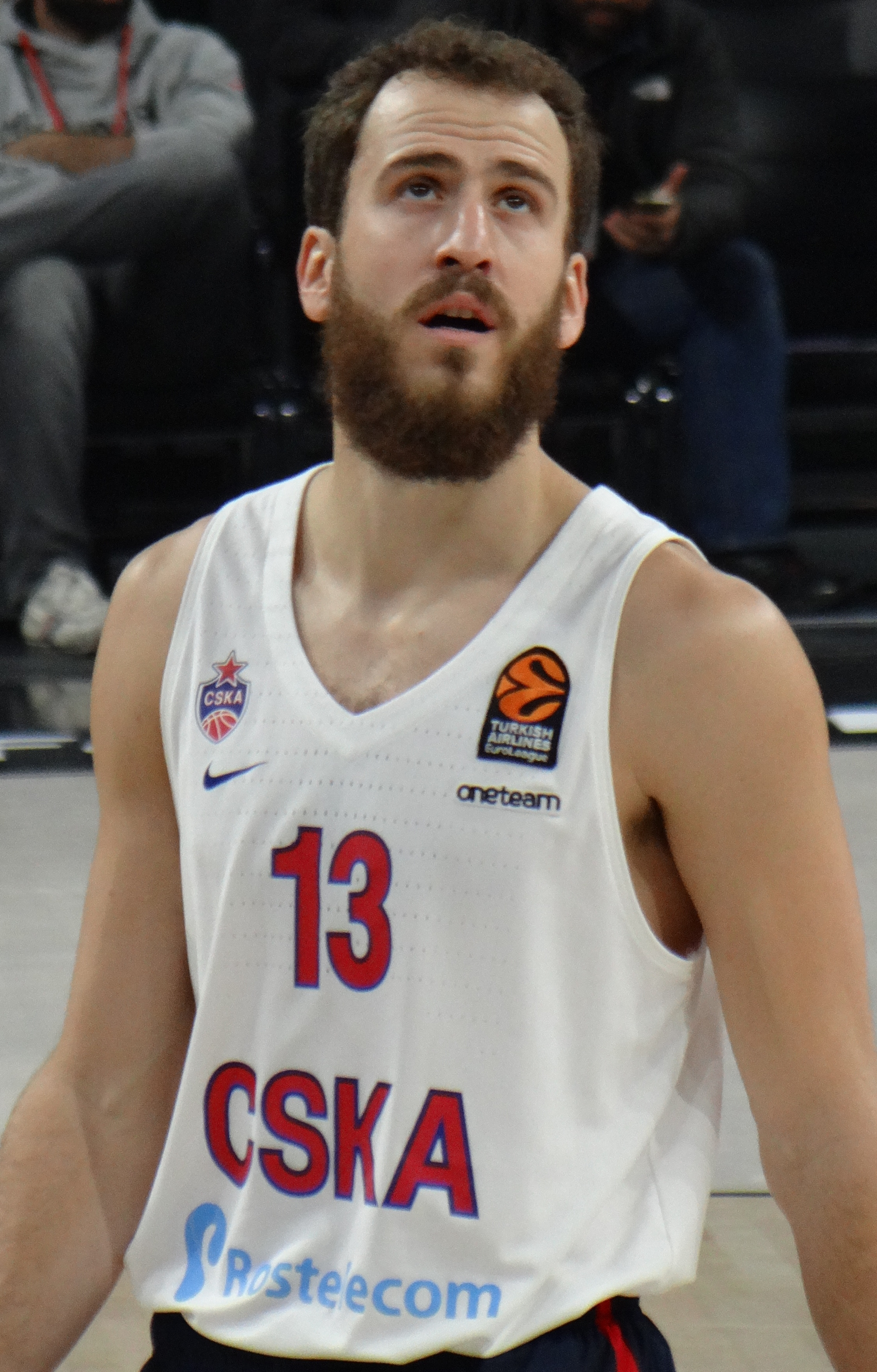
Sergio Rodríguez won the award in 2018

Season	Player	Position	Nationality	Team	Ref(s)
Final Four MVP
2008	Ramūnas Šiškauskas	Forward	Lithuania	CSKA Moscow	
2010	J.R. Holden	Guard	Russia^{1}	CSKA Moscow	
2011	Vitaly Fridzon	Guard	Russia	Khimki	
2012	Andrei Kirilenko	Forward	Russia	CSKA Moscow	
Playoffs MVP
2013	Victor Khryapa	Forward	Russia	CSKA Moscow	
2014	Miloš Teodosić	Guard	Serbia	CSKA Moscow	
2015	Andrey Vorontsevich	Forward	Russia	CSKA Moscow	
2016	Miloš Teodosić (2)	Guard	Serbia	CSKA Moscow	
2017	Nando de Colo	Guard	France	CSKA Moscow	
Final Four MVP
2018	Sergio Rodríguez	Guard	Spain	CSKA Moscow	
Playoffs MVP
2019	Nikita Kurbanov	Forward	Russia	CSKA Moscow	
2020	Not awarded ^{2}				
2021	Daniel Hackett	Guard	Italy^{3}	CSKA Moscow	
2022	Jordan Mickey	Forward	United States	Zenit Saint Petersburg	
2023	Nenad Dimitrijević	Guard	North Macedonia	UNICS Kazan	
2024	Melo Trimble	Guard	United States	CSKA Moscow	
2025	Melo Trimble (2)	Guard	United States	CSKA Moscow	

Notes

^1 J.R. Holden, born in Pittsburgh, Pennsylvania, also owns American nationality. He represented Russia in international competitions.
^2 There was no awarding in the 2019–20, because the season was cancelled due to the coronavirus pandemic in Europe.
^3 Daniel Hackett also owns American nationality. He represented Italy in international competitions.
