= 2008 VTB United League Promo-Cup =

VTB United League
- Season: 2008–09
- Duration: 20 December 2008 – 22 December 2008
- Teams: 8

Finals
- Champions: (Russia) CSKA Moscow (1st title)
- Runners-up: (Russia) Khimki Moscow Region
- Final Four MVP: (Lithuania) Ramūnas Šiškauskas

VTB United League Promo-Cup 2008 was the first test run tournament of the VTB United League. The tournament was held during the 2008–09 basketball season on 20–22 December 2008, at the CSKA Universal Sports Hall in Moscow. The tournament included 8 teams from Russia, Latvia, Lithuania, Poland and Ukraine.

CSKA Moscow won the tournament by defeating Khimki Moscow Region in the final. Kyiv finished in third place by defeating Dynamo Moscow.

== Promo-Cup 2008 clubs ==
Country (League)	Teams
Latvia (LBL)	ASK Riga
Lithuania (LKL)	Žalgiris Kaunas
Poland (PLK)	Prokom Sopot
Russia (Superleague A)	CSKA Moscow
Russia (Superleague A)	Dynamo Moscow
Russia (Superleague A)	Khimki Moscow Region
Ukraine (SuperLeague)	Azovmash Mariupol
Ukraine (SuperLeague)	Kyiv

== Quarterfinals ==
Quarterfinals
(Russia) Dynamo	75
(Poland) Prokom Sopot	54
(Russia) Khimki	74
(Ukraine) Azovmash	54
(Russia) CSKA	80
(Latvia) ASK Riga	67
(Ukraine) Kyiv	74
(Lithuania) Žalgiris Kaunas	67

Semifinals
(Russia) Dynamo	61
(Russia) Khimki	67
(Russia) CSKA	88
(Ukraine) Kyiv	58

Finals
(Russia) Khimki	66
(Russia) CSKA	70
Third place
(Russia) Dynamo	73
(Ukraine) Kyiv	86

== 5th-8th place ==
Semifinal 5/8
(Poland) Prokom Sopot	57
(Ukraine) Azovmash	88
(Latvia) ASK Riga	67
(Lithuania) Žalgiris Kaunas	95

5th Place
(Ukraine) Azovmash	78
(Lithuania) Žalgiris Kaunas	82
7th Place
(Poland) Prokom Sopot	56
(Latvia) ASK Riga	76

== Awards ==
VTB United League 2008

CSKA Moscow
1st Title

Final Four MVP
(Lithuania) Ramūnas Šiškauskas

== Final standings ==
Place	Team
1st place, gold medalist(s)	(Russia) CSKA Moscow
2nd place, silver medalist(s)	(Russia) Khimki Moscow Region
3rd place, bronze medalist(s)	(Ukraine) Kyiv
4th	(Russia) Dynamo Moscow
5th	(Lithuania) Žalgiris Kaunas
6th	(Ukraine) Azovmash Mariupol
7th	(Latvia) ASK Riga
8th	(Poland) Prokom Sopot

== All-Tournament Team ==
- J.R. Holden (CSKA Moscow)
- Anton Ponkrashov (Khimki Moscow Region)
- Manu Markoishvili (Kyiv)
- Kenan Bajramović (Kyiv)
- Mike Wilkinson (Khimki Moscow Region)
