= Jon Robert Holden =

American-Russian basketball player (born 1976)

Jon Robert Holden Джон Ро́берт Хо́лден
Detroit Pistons
- Title: Front office executive
- League: NBA

Personal information
- Born: August 10, 1976 (age 50) Pittsburgh, Pennsylvania, U.S.
- Listed height: 6 ft 1 in (1.85 m)
- Listed weight: 185 lb (84 kg)

Career information
- High school: Wilkinsburg (Wilkinsburg, Pennsylvania); Linsly School (Wheeling, West Virginia)
- College: Bucknell (1994–1998)
- NBA draft: 1998: undrafted
- Playing career: 1998–2011
- Position: Point guard / shooting guard
- Number: 10

Career history
- 1998–1999: ASK Brocēni
- 1999–2001: Telindus Oostende
- 2001–2002: AEK
- 2002–2011: CSKA Moscow

Career highlights
- 2× EuroLeague champion (2006, 2008); EuroLeague 2000–2010 All-Decade Team (2010); Greek League champion (2002); Greek League All-Star (2002); 2× VTB United League champion (2008, 2010); VTB United League Final Four MVP (2010); All-VTB United League First Team (2008); VTB United League Hall of Fame (2020); 9× Russian League champion (2003–2011); 4× Russian Cup winner (2005–2007, 2010); Belgian League champion (2001); Belgian Cup winner (2001); Latvian League champion (1999)

Jon Robert "J.R." Holden (Russian: Джон Ро́берт Хо́лден; born August 10, 1976) is an American-Russian former professional basketball player and current basketball executive who is serving as a front office executive of the Detroit Pistons in the National Basketball Association (NBA). He was previously the director of player personal of the Brooklyn Nets. Holden was born in Pittsburgh, Pennsylvania. At 1.85 m (6 ft 1 in) tall, he could play at both the point guard and shooting guard positions, but he primarily played at point guard.

As a member of CSKA Moscow, Holden won two EuroLeague titles, in 2006 and 2008. Moreover, he reached eight consecutive EuroLeague Final Four tournaments, a record he shares with his former CSKA teammate, Theo Papaloukas. His consistency at the highest level of European basketball earned him a selection to the EuroLeague 2000–2010 All-Decade Team.

He was also a member of the senior men's Russian national basketball team, which he helped lead to the FIBA EuroBasket title in 2007, Russia's first ever gold medal in the tournament.

== High school ==
Holden attended and played high school basketball Wilkinsburg High School, in Wilkinsburg, Pennsylvania, and at Linsly School, in Wheeling, West Virginia.

== College career ==
After high school, Holden played NCAA Division I college basketball at Bucknell University, with the Bucknell Bison, from 1994 to 1998.

== Professional career ==
After graduation from Bucknell, Holden received a call from the basketball club ASK/Brocēni/LMT, located in Riga, Latvia, offering him $3,000 net income a month to join their team. He accepted and began his professional career in European basketball.

Holden played for teams in: the Latvian League (ASK/Brocēni/LMT 1998–99), the Belgian League (Telindus Oostende 1999–01), the Greek Basket League (AEK Athens 2001–02) and the Russian Superleague A (CSKA Moscow 2002–2011). He won national championships in each country. He was named the 2003 Russian Superleague A Player of the Year by the website Eurobasket.com. He also earned an Import Players Honorable Mention in the 2002 Eurobasket.com website's All-Europe Rankings. Holden won the EuroLeague 2005–06 and the EuroLeague 2007–08 season championships with CSKA.

Holden started for CSKA Moscow against the Philadelphia 76ers in an exhibition game in October 2006, in Cologne, Germany, as part of the EA Sports NBA Europe Live 2006 promotional event.

== National team career ==
Holden's biggest achievement came in the FIBA EuroBasket 2007 final game against Spain, where with 2 seconds left in the game he scored the winning shot that gave Russia the championship. He was also named to the Russian squad for the 2008 Beijing Olympics men's basketball tournament.

== Post-playing career ==
After he retired from playing professional basketball, Holden became a scout, for the NBA's Detroit Pistons and the Philadelphia 76ers. He is currently the Director of Player Personnel for the Brooklyn Nets of the NBA.

== Personal life ==
On October 20, 2003, Holden became a Russian citizen by decree of President Vladimir Putin. This move was brought about by new Russian Basketball Federation regulations restricting the number of foreigners, and specifically Americans allowable on Russian League teams. In response to the move, CSKA Basketball CEO Sergei Kushchenko hatched the idea of Holden acquiring citizenship. Moscow mayor Yury Luzhkov and the Russian State Sports Committee both wrote letters in support of the decree. Holden currently maintains dual American and Russian citizenship.

In a September 2012 interview Holden stated that Dušan Ivković is one of the best coaches ever.

Jon is married to Aireka Holden. They reside in Bloomfield Hills, Michigan. They have a daughter and son.

== Career statistics ==
Legend
GP	Games played	GS	Games started	MPG	Minutes per game
FG%	Field-goal percentage	3P%	3-point field-goal percentage	FT%	Free-throw percentage
RPG	Rebounds per game	APG	Assists per game	SPG	Steals per game
BPG	Blocks per game	PPG	Points per game	PIR	Performance index rating
**Bold**	Career high

=== EuroLeague ===
†	Denotes season in which Holden won the EuroLeague
*	Led the league

Year	Team	GP	GS	MPG	FG%	3P%	FT%	RPG	APG	SPG	BPG	PPG	PIR
2001–02	AEK Athens	20	19	**35.7**	.362	.302	.616	**2.4**	2.8	1.4	—	**17.2**	12.3
2002–03	CSKA Moscow	22	20	33.4	.395	.356	.638	2.2	**4.4**	**1.7**	—	15.5	**13.5**
2003–04	CSKA Moscow	22	22	33.3	.393	.312	.563	2.3	3.8	1.2	**.1**	14.2	10.2
2004–05	CSKA Moscow	24	24	31.0	.363	.297	.847	2.2	2.8	1.1	—	11.3	8.8
2005–06†	CSKA Moscow	24	23	31.3	.416	.336	.642	1.6	2.0	1.4	—	11.4	9.1
2006–07	CSKA Moscow	**25**	22	29.9	**.433**	.366	.667	2.3	2.3	1.2	—	10.0	8.9
2007–08†	CSKA Moscow	**25***	**25***	28.4	.376	.367	.741	2.0	3.0	1.1	.0	7.7	7.6
2008–09	CSKA Moscow	16	15	29.4	.393	**.380**	.792	2.0	3.4	.8	—	7.9	7.9
2009–10	CSKA Moscow	21	5	30.9	.352	.358	**.905**	1.8	1.8	1.1	.0	10.3	6.2
2010–11	CSKA Moscow	10	8	29.7	.264	.295	.500	1.9	3.4	.5	—	6.4	2.6
Career		209	183	31.4	.381	.335	.674	2.1	2.9	1.2	.0	11.4	9.0

== Awards and Accomplishments ==
=== Clubs ===
- Latvian League Champion: (1999)
- Belgian League Champion: (2001)
- Belgian Cup Winner: (2001)
- Greek League All-Star: (2002)
- Greek League Champion: (2002)
- 9× Russian Championship Champion: (2003, 2004, 2005, 2006, 2007, 2008, 2009, 2010, 2011)
- 4× Russian Cup Winner: (2005, 2006, 2007, 2010)
- 2× EuroLeague Champion: (2006, 2008)

=== Russian senior national team ===
- FIBA EuroBasket Gold: (2007)

=== Individual awards ===
- Eurobasket.com website's Russian Super League Player of the Year: (2003)
- EuroLeague Finals Top Scorer: (2009)
- VTB United League Final Four MVP: (2010)
- EuroLeague 2000–2010 All-Decade Team: (2010)
- (2025 Naismith Basketball Hall of Fame International Basketball Nominee)
