= 2019–20 VTB United League =

Russian first tier basketball season

VTB United League
- Season: 2019–20
- Duration: 25 September 2019 – 12 March 2020 (cancelled)
- Teams: 13

The 2019–20 VTB United League was the 11th season of the VTB United League. It was the seventh season that the league functions as the Russian domestic first tier level.

CSKA Moscow was the defending champion.

On 13 March, the season was suspended due to the COVID-19 pandemic. On 27 March, the season was cancelled, with no champion declared for that season.

== Format changes ==
From this season, playoff games will be played in a best-of-three format with a 1–1–1 structure.

== Teams ==
A total of 13 teams from five countries contest the league, including nine sides from Russia, one from Belarus, one from Estonia, one from Kazakhstan, and one from Poland.

This season VEF Riga from Latvia cancelled the participation.

=== Venues and locations ===
Locations of teams in the 2019–20 VTB United League

Team	Home city	Arena	Capacity
(Kazakhstan) Astana	Nur-Sultan	Arena Velotrack	9,270
(Russia) Avtodor	Saratov	DS Kristall	5,500
(Russia) CSKA Moscow	Moscow	USC CSKA	5,000
(Russia) Enisey	Krasnoyarsk	Arena.Sever	4,000
(Estonia) Kalev/Cramo	Tallinn	Saku Suurhall	5,500
(Russia) Khimki	Khimki	BCMO	4,000
(Russia) Lokomotiv Kuban	Krasnodar	Basket-Hall	7,500
(Russia) Nizhny Novgorod	Nizhny Novgorod	Trade Union Sport Palace	5,500
(Russia) Parma	Perm	UDS Molot	7,000
(Belarus) Tsmoki Minsk	Minsk	Minsk-Arena	15,000
(Russia) UNICS	Kazan	Basket-Hall	7,000
(Russia) Zenit	Saint Petersburg	Sibur Arena	6,381
(Poland) Zielona Góra	Zielona Góra	CRS Hall Zielona Góra	6,080

== Regular season ==
In the regular season, teams play against each other twice (home-and-away) in a round-robin format.

=== Standings ===
Pos	Team	Pld	W	L	PF	PA	PD	Qualification
1	(Russia) Khimki	19	18	1	1809	1574	+235	Already qualified for EuroLeague
2	(Russia) CSKA Moscow	19	15	4	1707	1450	+257	Already qualified for EuroLeague
3	(Russia) Lokomotiv Kuban	20	14	6	1723	1600	+123	Qualification for EuroCup
4	(Russia) UNICS	18	12	6	1546	1527	+19	Qualification for EuroCup
5	(Russia) Parma	18	8	10	1567	1547	+20	Qualification for FIBA Europe Cup
6	(Russia) Zenit Saint Petersburg	18	8	10	1514	1452	+62	Already qualified for EuroLeague
7	(Poland) Zielona Góra	19	8	11	1604	1681	−77	
8	(Estonia) Kalev/Cramo	20	8	12	1537	1704	−167	
9	(Kazakhstan) Astana	18	7	11	1501	1578	−77	
10	(Russia) Nizhny Novgorod	18	7	11	1557	1651	−94	Qualification for Basketball Champions League
11	(Russia) Enisey	18	7	11	1525	1585	−60	
12	(Russia) Avtodor	18	5	13	1504	1634	−130	
13	(Belarus) Tsmoki Minsk	19	4	15	1534	1645	−111	

Source: VTB United League

=== Results ===
Home \ Away	AST	AVT	CSK	ENI	KAL	KHI	LOK	NIZ	PAR	TSM	UNI	ZEN	ZGA
Astana	—		72–95	95–90		88–91	90–88	79–84		91–89	78–83	109–108	92–80
Avtodor	90–85	—			100–90	84–101	81–97	92–90	78–85	109–90		66–109	86–89
CSKA Moscow	104–91	103–79	—		81–67		81–72	94–69	89–74	114–81		79–82	
Enisey	64–78	85–78	80–71	—	86–73	86–106	98–91		83–85		95–93	67–84	84–91
Kalev/Cramo	84–76	88–76	50–91	94–87	—	63–86	81–98			79–84	85–63	84–80	70–92
Khimki	73–56	79–74	96–80	91–87	118–81	—	89–94	98–94	103–100	77–73	109–83		79–75
Lokomotiv Kuban		74–76	71–77	94–79	87–63		—	87–83	83–75	78–70	86–77	78–70	93–71
Nizhny Novgorod			84–93	104–101	74–76	87–113	96–93	—	105–99	82–77	83–95		82–87
Parma	100–91	97–81	70–89	88–90	85–74			106–71	—	68–75	88–89	82–84	91–76
Tsmoki Minsk	96–77	88–80	91–94	80–83		80–94	80–88			—	80–84	60–80	73–80
UNICS	81–72	86–83	94–86		87–76	88–98		89–85		85–71	—	80–93	86–73
Zenit Saint Petersburg			63–82	89–80	75–76	101–108	80–86	69–76	80–86		75–86	—	
Zielona Góra	78–81	98–91	64–104				83–85	103–108	106–88	102–96	89–100	67–92	—

Source: VTB United League
Legend: Blue = home team win; Red = away team win.

== Awards ==
=== MVP of the Month ===
Month	Player	Team	Ref.
2019
October	(United States) Jeremy Evans	(Russia) Khimki	
November	(United States) Mike James	(Russia) CSKA Moscow	
December	(United States) Errick McCollum	(Russia) UNICS	
2020
January	(United States) Alan Williams	(Russia) Lokomotiv Kuban	
February	(United States) Devin Booker	(Russia) Khimki	

== VTB League teams in European competitions ==
Team	Competition	Progress
CSKA Moscow	EuroLeague	Regular season
Khimki	EuroLeague	Regular season
Zenit Saint Petersburg	EuroLeague	Regular season
Lokomotiv Kuban	EuroCup	Regular season
UNICS	EuroCup	Quarterfinals
Nizhny Novgorod	Champions League	Round of 16
Enisey	FIBA Europe Cup	Second round
Tsmoki-Minsk	FIBA Europe Cup	Quarterfinals
