= BC Nizhny Novgorod =

Professional basketball team in Nizhny Novgorod, Russia

Pari Nizhny Novgorod
- League: VTB United League; Russian Cup
- Founded: 2000; 26 years ago
- History: NBA Nizhny Novgorod; 2001–2009; BC Nizhny Novgorod; 2009–2022; BC Pari Nizhny Novgorod; 2022–2026
- Arena: CEC Nagorny
- Capacity: 5,600
- Location: Nizhny Novgorod, Russia
- Team colors: Black, White
- President: Sergei Panov
- Head coach: Sergey Kozin
- Website: nn-basket.ru
Home	Away

BC Nizhny Novgorod (Russian: БК «Нижний Новгород»), commonly known as simply Nizhny Novgorod, also known as Pari Nizhny Novgorod for sponsorship reasons, is a Russian professional basketball club from the city of Nizhny Novgorod. It participates in the VTB United League.

== History ==
Basketball club Nizhny Novgorod is the only professional men's basketball team in Nizhny Novgorod and the region. It was founded in 2000. It played in the Russian Third Division. In the 2001–02 season the club was named Nizhegorodsky Basketball Academy, or NBA. Since then it had changed several names: NBA (2001–2002), NBA-Seti-NN (2002–2004), NBA-Telma (2004–2006). After the 2005–06 season the team entered the Superleague B and was called NBA-Nizhny Novgorod.

Two seasons in the Superleague B were successful for NBA-NN, with the 5th and the 6th places. In 2008–09 the team finished only the 7th. In October 2008 there were changes in the management. The new Minister for Investment Policies of Nizhny Novgorod region, Olympic champion Dmitri Svatkovskiy became the President of the club. Sergei Panov – the twelve times champion of Russia, Euroleague champion, silver medallist of the World and European championships – became the general manager.

Before the season 2009–10 the management worked on the players selection ending with the entire changes to the team roster. Beside this the club changed its name to BC Nizhny Novgorod (BCNN). By the end of the 2010 season the team took the first place in the Superleague B which respectively granted them the right to play in the elite division of the Russian basketball.яуйи

During the 2010–11 season BCNN was among those clubs who had founded the new Russian Professional Basketball League. Also the team played in the EuroChallenge in 2010–11, not having much success though getting new international cup experience. In the Cup of Russia 2010–11 season, for the first time in its history BCNN took part in the Final of the Four winning silver medals.

During its first year in the Russian basketball elite division, Nizhny Novgorod took the final fifth place in the Russian championship. In the 2011–12 season the team failed to enter the play-off of the Russian championship, finishing the season at #9.

In the 2013–14 season Nizhny Novgorod reached the Finals of the VTB United League, in which it lost 0–3 to CSKA Moscow. Therefore, the team qualified for the 2014–15 EuroLeague regular season. The team reached the Top 16 over the likes of UNICS and Sassari. In 2015, Israeli NBA player Gal Mekel played for the team.

== Honours ==
Total titles: 2

=== Domestic competition ===
- VTB United League
  - Runners-up (1): 2013–14
- Russian Cup
  - Winner (1): 2023
  - Runner-up (4): 2011, 2018, 2019, 2024, 2025
- Russian Basketball Super League 1
  - Winner (1): 2010

=== European competition ===
- EuroCup
  - Semi-finalist (1): 2013–14

== Logos ==
Before the start of the 2016–17 season, Nizhny Novgorod changed its primary logo.

Logo used until 2016

Logo (2016–2022)

Logo (2022–present)

== Season by season ==
Season	Tier	League	Pos.	Russian Cup	European competitions	
2000–01	3	Higher League	16th			
2001–02	3	Higher League	4th			
2002–03	3	Higher League	3rd	First round		
2003–04	3	Higher League	9th	Round of 64		
2004–05	3	Higher League	6th	First round		
2005–06	3	Higher League	3rd	First round		
2006–07	2	Superliga B	5th	Round of 16		
2007–08	2	Superliga B	6th	Round of 16		
2008–09	2	Superliga B	7th	Round of 32		
2009–10	2	Superliga B	1st	Round of 16		
2010–11	1	PBL	5th	Runner-up	3 EuroChallenge	RS
2011–12	1	PBL	9th	QF	3 EuroChallenge	L16
2011–12	1	VTB United	R16	QF	3 EuroChallenge	L16
2012–13	1	PBL	8th	QF		
2012–13	1	VTB United	QF	QF		
2013–14	1	VTB United	RU		2 Eurocup	SF
2014–15	1	VTB United	4th		1 Euroleague	T16
2015–16	1	VTB United	7th		2 Eurocup	QF
2016–17	1	VTB United	9th		2 EuroCup	T16
2017–18	1	VTB United	7th	Runner-up	3 Champions League	QR2
2017–18	1	VTB United	7th	Runner-up	4 FIBA Europe Cup	QF
2018–19	1	VTB United	6th	Runner-up	3 Champions League	QF
2019–20	1	VTB United	8th	QF	3 Champions League	L16
2020–21	1	VTB United	5th		3 Champions League	QF
2021–22	1	VTB United	8th		3 Champions League	GR
2022–23	1	VTB United	5th	Winner		

== Roster ==
Note: Flags indicate national team eligibility at FIBA-sanctioned events. Players may hold other non-FIBA nationalities not displayed.

BC Nizhny Novgorod roster
Players
Coaches

Pos.	No.	Nat.	Name	Ht.	Wt.	Age
PG	5	(United States)	Washington, Isaiah	1.85 m (6 ft 1 in)	88 kg (194 lb)	27 – 20 July 1998
G	7	(Russia)	Khomenko, Alexander	1.90 m (6 ft 3 in)	85 kg (187 lb)	27 – 25 January 1999
C	8	(Russia)	Grishaev, Sergey	2.08 m (6 ft 10 in)	110 kg (243 lb)	23 – 20 November 2002
C	9	(Russia)	Karpenkov, Ilia	2.04 m (6 ft 8 in)	126 kg (278 lb)	29 – 17 February 1997
F	11	(Russia)	Platonov, Ilya	2.00 m (6 ft 7 in)	96 kg (212 lb)	27 – 31 July 1998
F	12	(United States)	Dean, Hunter	2.08 m (6 ft 10 in)	113 kg (249 lb)	25 – 18 June 2001
PG	13	(Russia)	Khvostov, Dmitry	1.91 m (6 ft 3 in)	84 kg (185 lb)	36 – 21 August 1989
SF	18	(Hungary)	Lukacs, Norbert	2.03 m (6 ft 8 in)	93 kg (205 lb)	25 – 18 May 2001
C	21	(Russia)	Popov, Kirill	2.08 m (6 ft 10 in)	103 kg (227 lb)	28 – 21 May 1998
SG	44	(Russia)	Baburin, Evgeny (C)	1.90 m (6 ft 3 in)	94 kg (207 lb)	38 – 4 July 1987
G	55	(Russia)	Zotkin, Sergey	1.90 m (6 ft 3 in)	82 kg (181 lb)	22 – 9 September 2003

Head coach

- (Russia) Sergey Kozin

Assistant coach(es)

- (Russia) Roman Gorelovsky
- (Serbia) Petar Zlatanovich
- (Russia) Bogdan Bogdanov

Legend

- (C) Team captain
- Injured

- Roster
Updated: December 20, 2025
