= 2017–18 VTB United League =

VTB United League
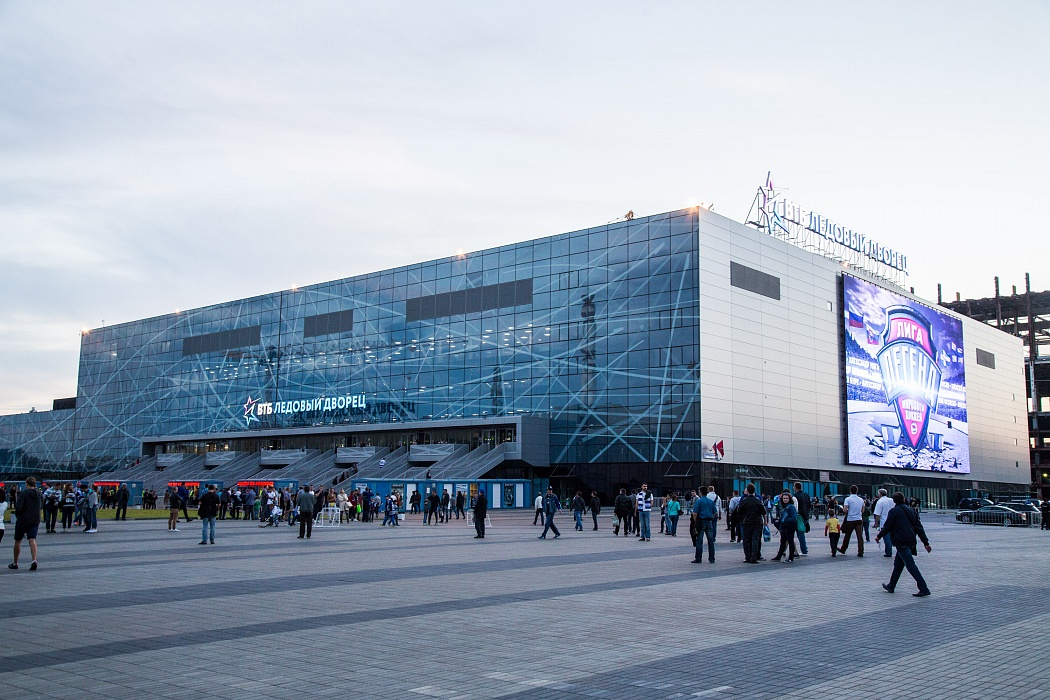
- The VTB Ice Palace in Moscow hosted the Final Four
- Season: 2017–18
- Games played: 156
- Teams: 13

Regular season
- EuroLeague: Khimki
- EuroCup: UNICS; Zenit Saint Petersburg; Lokomotiv Kuban
- Season MVP: Nando de Colo

Finals
- Champions: (Russia) CSKA Moscow (9th title)
- Runners-up: (Russia) Khimki
- Third place: (Russia) Zenit Saint Petersburg
- Fourth place: (Russia) UNICS
- Final Four MVP: Sergio Rodríguez

Statistical leaders
Points	(Russia) Alexey Shved	22.3
Rebounds	(United States) Ike Udanoh	8.5
Assists	(Bulgaria) Codi Miller-McIntyre	8.0

Records
- Biggest home win: Lokomotiv Kuban 106–57 Enisey (5 May 2018)
- Biggest away win: VEF 64–104 Khimki (9 October 2017)
- Highest scoring: CSKA 108–100 Kalev/Cramo (4 December 2017); Avtodor 98–110 CSKA (4 March 2018)
- Winning streak: 12 games CSKA
- Losing streak: 7 games Enisey
- Highest attendance: 7,389; Lokomotiv Kuban 93–78 Khimki (21 January 2018)
- Lowest attendance: 350; VEF 82–70 Tsmoki (28 January 2018)

The 2017–18 VTB United League was the ninth complete season of the VTB United League. It is also the fifth season that the league functions as the Russian domestic first tier level. It started on 5 October 2017 with the first round of the regular season and ended on 10 June 2018 with the championship game of the Final Four. CSKA Moscow were the defending champions.

CSKA Moscow successfully defended its title as it won the final over Khimki.

== Format changes ==
From this season, the top eight teams qualify for the playoffs. These are played in a best-of-five format with a 1–2–2 structure. The four teams that win their playoff series qualify for the Final Four tournament, which decides the new champion.

== Teams ==
A total of 13 teams from five countries contest the league, including nine sides from Russia, one from Belarus, one from Estonia, one from Kazakhstan and one from Latvia.

=== Venues and locations ===
Locations of teams in the 2017–18 VTB United League

Team	Home city	Arena	Capacity
(Kazakhstan) Astana	Astana	Arena Velotrack	9,270
(Russia) Avtodor Saratov	Saratov	DS Kristall	5,500
(Russia) CSKA Moscow	Moscow	USC CSKA	5,000
(Russia) Enisey	Krasnoyarsk	Arena.Sever	4,000
(Estonia) Kalev/Cramo	Tallinn	Saku Suurhall	5,500
(Russia) Khimki	Khimki	BCMO	4,000
(Russia) Lokomotiv Kuban	Krasnodar	Basket-Hall	7,500
(Russia) Nizhny Novgorod	Nizhny Novgorod	Trade Union Sport Palace	5,500
(Russia) Parma	Perm	UDS Molot	7,000
(Belarus) Tsmoki Minsk	Minsk	Minsk-Arena	15,000
(Russia) UNICS	Kazan	Basket-Hall	7,000
(Latvia) VEF Rīga	Riga	Arēna Rīga	12,000
(Russia) Zenit Saint Petersburg	Saint Petersburg	SK Yubileyniy	6,381

=== Personnel and sponsorship ===
Team	Head coach	Kit manufacturer	Shirt sponsor
Astana	(Greece) Kostas Flevarakis	Tuta	
Avtodor Saratov	(Ukraine) Vladimir Anstiferov	Digs	
CSKA Moscow	(Greece) Dimitrios Itoudis	Nike	Rostelecom
Enisey	(Russia) Oleg Okulov	Nike	
Kalev/Cramo	(Lithuania) Donaldas Kairys	Nike	Cramo
Khimki	(Greece) Georgios Bartzokas	Adidas	Khimki Group
Lokomotiv Kuban	(Serbia) Saša Obradović	Under Armour	Russian Railways
Nizhny Novgorod	(Serbia) Zoran Lukić	Nike	T+ Group
Parma	(Russia) Vyacheslav Shushakov	Peak	T+ Group
Tsmoki Minsk	(Belarus) Igor Griszczuk	Adidas	
UNICS	(Greece) Dimitrios Priftis	Peak	
VEF Rīga	(Latvia) Jānis Gailītis	Adidas	
Zenit Saint Petersburg	(Russia) Vasiliy Karasev	Nike	Nipigas

== Regular season ==
In the regular season, teams play against each other twice (home-and-away) in a double round-robin format. The top eight teams advance to the playoffs. The regular season started on 5 October 2017.

=== Standings ===
Pos	Team	Pld	W	L	PF	PA	PD	PCT	Qualification
1	(Russia) CSKA Moscow	24	22	2	2268	1894	+374	.917	Advance to playoffs
2	(Russia) UNICS	24	22	2	2074	1829	+245	.917	Advance to playoffs
3	(Russia) Lokomotiv Kuban	24	17	7	2036	1755	+281	.708	Advance to playoffs
4	(Russia) Zenit Saint Petersburg	24	16	8	2053	2052	+1	.667	Advance to playoffs
5	(Russia) Avtodor Saratov	24	14	10	2107	2104	+3	.583	Advance to playoffs
6	(Russia) Khimki	24	13	11	2038	1942	+96	.542	Advance to playoffs
7	(Russia) Nizhny Novgorod	24	10	14	2046	2094	−48	.417	Advance to playoffs
8	(Latvia) VEF Rīga	24	8	16	1864	1980	−116	.333	Advance to playoffs
9	(Belarus) Tsmoki Minsk	24	8	16	1792	1982	−190	.333	
10	(Kazakhstan) Astana	24	7	17	1836	1932	−96	.292	
11	(Russia) Parma	24	7	17	1951	2086	−135	.292	
12	(Estonia) Kalev/Cramo	24	6	18	2030	2196	−166	.250	
13	(Russia) Enisey	24	6	18	1892	2141	−249	.250	

Source: VTB United League

=== Results ===
Home \ Away	AST	SAR	CSK	ENI	KAL	KHI	LOK	NIZ	PAR	TSM	UNI	VEF	ZEN
Astana	—	75–92	72–92	92–75	102–92	84–79	50–83	73–85	78–84	77–59	73–78	67–53	87–64
Avtodor Saratov	92–86	—	98–110	102–83	82–77	104–92	77–110	84–75	82–87	104–82	78–80	89–84	92–107
CSKA Moscow	79–63	93–66	—	108–73	108–100	90–71	79–90	97–80	101–94	90–54	80–63	94–69	100–84
Enisey	90–76	83–88	72–87	—	88–91	84–89	49–75	98–90	96–77	91–80	89–93	68–75	84–104
Kalev/Cramo	83–73	95–89	95–105	97–88	—	92–84	62–88	97–103	74–76	80–85	67–75	98–94	89–95
Khimki	72–71	88–75	81–96	92–62	96–85	—	83–90	90–87	90–87	83–55	80–83	73–77	66–76
Lokomotiv Kuban	79–78	90–93	75–78	106–57	95–62	93–78	—	94–64	94–64	67–56	67–77	83–70	87–84
Nizhny Novgorod	79–78	84–82	90–104	79–85	103–85	79–82	92–86	—	73–88	82–91	89–91	80–64	100–90
Parma	84–90	94–96	76–111	96–73	104–84	69–106	73–86	80–82	—	81–88	81–88	87–69	94–99
Tsmoki Minsk	75–66	82–85	83–93	74–88	87–84	79–82	88–84	70–78	66–65	—	65–91	84–77	81–82
UNICS	90–75	89–82	75–88	91–76	104–78	80–79	93–65	99–93	84–70	87–62	—	89–81	94–60
VEF Rīga	89–77	79–82	83–102	94–67	87–83	64–104	69–71	94–90	78–67	82–70	69–81	—	80–90
Zenit Saint Petersburg	84–73	79–93	87–83	85–73	85–80	80–98	79–78	92–89	98–73	83–76	82–99	84–83	—

Source: VTB United League
Legend: Blue = home team win; Red = away team win.
Matches with lighter background shading were decided after overtime.

== Playoffs ==
In the playoffs, a best-of-five games format is used. The team that wins the series will be the first team to win three games. The first game will be played on the playing court of the four highest-place teams, the second and third game will be played on the playing court of the next four highest-place teams and the fourth and fifth game, if necessary, will be played on the playing court of the four highest-place teams. The playoffs started on 23 May 2018.

Team 1	Series	Team 2	Game 1	Game 2	Game 3	Game 4	Game 5
CSKA Moscow (Russia)	3–0	(Latvia) VEF Rīga	112–83	100–80	99–73		
Zenit Saint Petersburg (Russia)	3–0	(Russia) Avtodor Saratov	91–80	79–73	90–78		
UNICS (Russia)	3–1	(Russia) Nizhny Novgorod	84–66	74–77	95–94	101–86	
Lokomotiv Kuban (Russia)	0–3	(Russia) Khimki	66–79	72–77	73–86		

== Final Four ==
The four winners of the quarterfinals qualified for the inaugural Final Four. The Final Four will be held from 8 until 10 June. In April 2018, it was announced that the VTB Ice Palace in Moscow, Russia will host the tournament.

The four winners of the play-offs during the 2017–18 season qualified for the Final Four. The tournament will be hosted between 8 June and 10 June 2018.

The last final four was held in 2012, as the league was decided through playoff series in the previous years. Khimki, the runners-up of the Final Four, qualified for the 2018–19 EuroLeague (as CSKA Moscow was already qualified).

Semifinals
8 June
(Russia) CSKA Moscow	84
(Russia) Zenit Saint Petersburg	67
8 June
(Russia) UNICS	71
(Russia) Khimki	76

Final
10 June
(Russia) CSKA Moscow	95
(Russia) Khimki	84
Third place game
10 June
(Russia) UNICS	79
(Russia) Zenit Saint Petersburg	93

=== Semifinals ===
8 June 2018	CSKA Moscow (Russia)	84–67	(Russia) Zenit Saint Petersburg	Moscow
18:00 (UTC+3)	Scoring by quarter: 14–10, 30–20, 19–11, 21–26
	Pts: Rodríguez 21; Rebs: Clyburn 5 Asts: Rodríguez 5 Eff: Rodríguez 29	Boxscore	Pts: Harper 16; Rebs: Harper 7 Asts: Harper 4 Eff: Harper 18	Arena: VTB Ice Palace; Attendance: 5,700; Referees: Sreten Radović (CRO), Jakub Zamojski (POL), Alexey Davydov (RUS)

8 June 2018	UNICS (Russia)	71–76	(Russia) Khimki	Moscow
21:00 (UTC+3)	Scoring by quarter: 18–23, 14–15, 15–14, 24–24
	Pts: Smith 23; Rebs: Lasme 12; Asts: Smith 4 Eff: Lasme, Smith 22	Boxscore	Pts: Shved 36; Rebs: Thomas 8 Asts: Shved 5 Eff: Shved 24	Arena: VTB Ice Palace; Attendance: 5,350; Referees: Fernando Rocha (POR), Oļegs Latiševs (LAT), Petri Mäntylä (FIN)

=== Third place game ===
10 June 2018	UNICS (Russia)	79–93	(Russia) Zenit Saint Petersburg	Moscow
16:00 (UTC+3)	Scoring by quarter: 15–26, 26–26, 20–18, 18–23
	Pts: Smith 16; Rebs: Ponkrashov 9 Asts: Ponkrashov 4 Eff: three players 18	Boxscore	Pts: Kuric 29; Rebs: Whittington 7 Asts: Karasev 3 Eff: Kuric 28	Arena: VTB Ice Palace; Attendance: 6,230; Referees: Jakub Zamojski (POL), Robert Vyklický (CZE), Semen Ovinov (RUS)

=== Final ===
10 June 2018	CSKA Moscow (Russia)	95–84	(Russia) Khimki	Moscow
19:00 (UTC+3)	Scoring by quarter: 27–18, 27–23, 25–28, 16–15
	Pts: Higgins 20; Rebs: Hines 8 Asts: Rodríguez 8 Eff: Hines 22	Boxscore	Pts: Shved 21; Rebs: Thomas 7 Asts: Shved 9 Eff: Thomas 19	Arena: VTB Ice Palace; Referees: Sreten Radović (CRO), Fernando Rocha (POR), Oļegs Latiševs (LAT)

== Final standings ==
Pos	Team	Pld	W	L	Qualification
1	(Russia) CSKA Moscow (Note: CSKA Moscow was automatically qualified for the 2018-19 EuroLeague as it holds a 10-year contract with the league.)	29	27	2	Qualification to EuroLeague
2	(Russia) Khimki	29	17	12	Qualification to EuroLeague
3	(Russia) Zenit Saint Petersburg	29	20	9	Qualification to EuroCup
4	(Russia) UNICS	30	25	5	Qualification to EuroCup
5	(Russia) Lokomotiv Kuban	27	17	10	Qualification to EuroCup
6	(Russia) Avtodor Saratov	24	14	10	Qualification to Champions League
7	(Russia) Nizhny Novgorod	28	11	17	Qualification to Champions League
8	(Latvia) VEF Rīga	27	8	19	
9	(Belarus) Tsmoki Minsk	24	8	16	
10	(Kazakhstan) Astana	24	7	17	
11	(Russia) Parma	24	7	17	
12	(Estonia) Kalev/Cramo	24	6	18	
13	(Russia) Enisey	24	6	18	

Source: VTB United League

== Attendance ==
Attendance include playoff games:

Pos	Team	Total	High	Low	Average	Change
1	(Russia) Parma	57,499	6,254	3,517	4,792	−6.3%
2	(Russia) Lokomotiv Kuban	58,688	7,389	2,856	4,514	+3.7%
3	(Russia) UNICS	54,195	6,223	1,786	3,871	+167.1%
4	(Russia) Zenit Saint Petersburg	45,304	5,670	1,780	3,485	−3.0%
5	(Russia) Avtodor Saratov	38,016	5,048	1,470	2,715	+2.5%
6	(Russia) CSKA Moscow	28,896	4,500	600	2,064	−5.5%
7	(Russia) Khimki	27,721	3,500	1,014	1,980	−10.8%
8	(Russia) Nizhny Novgorod	24,905	2,598	1,078	1,779	+133.8%
9	(Kazakhstan) Astana	14,994	1,952	734	1,250	+79.3%
10	(Belarus) Tsmoki Minsk	13,570	1,363	851	1,131	+2.3%
11	(Estonia) Kalev/Cramo	13,350	2,800	600	1,113	−1.7%
12	(Russia) Enisey	10,810	3,000	400	901	−44.8%
13	(Latvia) VEF Rīga	8,100	1,500	350	623	−22.9%
	League total	396,048	7,389	350	2,343	+7.1%

Updated to match(es) played on 31 May 2018. Source: VTB United League

== Awards ==
=== Season Awards ===
Scoring Champion

- (Russia) Alexey Shved – Khimki

Young Player of the Year

- (United States) Isaiah Briscoe – Kalev

Top Performance of the Year

- (Serbia) Stevan Jelovac – Nizhny Novgorod

Defensive Player of the Year

- (Russia) Dmitry Kulagin – Nizhny Novgorod

Sixth Man of the Year

- (United States) Jamar Smith – UNICS

Coach of the Year

- (Greece) Dimitrios Itoudis – CSKA Moscow

Regular Season MVP

- (France) Nando de Colo – CSKA Moscow

Final Four MVP

- (Spain) Sergio Rodríguez – CSKA Moscow

=== MVP of the Month ===
Month	Player	Team	Ref.
2017
October	(Spain) Quino Colom	(Russia) UNICS	
November	(France) Nando de Colo	(Russia) CSKA Moscow	
December	(United States) Mardy Collins	(Russia) Lokomotiv Kuban	
2018
January	(Russia) Sergey Karasev	(Russia) Zenit Saint Petersburg	
February	(United States) Justin Robinson	(Russia) Avtodor Saratov	
March	(United States) Jamar Smith	(Russia) UNICS	
April	(United States) Coty Clarke	(Russia) Avtodor Saratov	
May	(Serbia) Stevan Jelovac	(Russia) Nizhny Novgorod	

== VTB United League clubs in European competitions ==
Team	Competition	Progress
Avtodor Saratov	Champions League	Third qualifying round
Avtodor Saratov	FIBA Europe Cup	Regular season
CSKA Moscow	EuroLeague	Fourth place
Enisey	Champions League	Regular season
Kalev/Cramo	Champions League	Second qualifying round
Khimki	EuroLeague	Playoffs
Lokomotiv Kuban	EuroCup	Runner-up
Nizhny Novgorod	Champions League	Second qualifying round
Nizhny Novgorod	FIBA Europe Cup	Quarterfinal
Parma	FIBA Europe Cup	Second qualifying round
Tsmoki Minsk	Champions League	Third qualifying round
Tsmoki Minsk	FIBA Europe Cup	Round of 16
UNICS	EuroCup	Quarterfinal
Zenit Saint Petersburg	EuroCup	Quarterfinal
