= 2011–12 VTB United League =

VTB United League
- Season: 2011–12
- Duration: 27 September 2011 – 3 May 2012
- Teams: 22 (with qualifying rounds); 18 (regular season)

Regular season
- Season MVP: (Russia) Andrei Kirilenko

Finals
- Champions: (Russia) CSKA Moscow (3rd title)
- Runners-up: (Russia) UNICS Kazan
- Final Four MVP: (Russia) Andrei Kirilenko

Statistical leaders
Points	(Guyana) Rawle Marshall	16.8

The 2011–12 VTB United League was the third complete season of the VTB United League, which is Northern Europe and Eastern Europe's top-tier level men's professional club basketball competition. The tournament featured 18 teams, from 10 countries.

== Participants ==
Country (League)	Teams
Belarus (BPL)	Minsk-2006 Minsk
Czech Republic (NBL)	ČEZ Basketball Nymburk
Estonia (KML)	Kalev Tallinn
Finland (Korisliiga)	Torpan Pojat
Kazakhstan (KBL)	BC Astana
Latvia (LBL)	VEF Rīga
Lithuania (LKL)	Lietuvos Rytas Vilnius
Lithuania (LKL)	BC Šiauliai
Lithuania (LKL)	Žalgiris Kaunas
Poland (PLK)	Asseco Prokom Gdynia
Poland (PLK)	BC Anwil
Russia (PBL)	CSKA Moscow
Russia (PBL)	Khimki Moscow Region
Russia (PBL)	UNICS Kazan
Russia (PBL)	Lokomotiv–Kuban Krasnodar
Russia (PBL)	Spartak Saint Petersburg
Russia (PBL)	BC Enisey Krasnoyarsk
Russia (PBL)	Krasnye Krylya Samara
Russia (PBL)	BC Nizhny Novgorod
Ukraine (SuperLeague)	Azovmash Mariupol
Ukraine (SuperLeague)	BC Budivelnyk
Ukraine (SuperLeague)	BC Dnipro

== Qualifying round ==
=== Group A ===
	Team	Pld	W	L	PF	PA	Diff
1.	(Russia) BC Enisey Krasnoyarsk	2	2	0	168	122	+46
2.	(Poland) BC Anwil	2	1	1	160	155	+5
3.	(Finland) Torpan Pojat	2	0	2	128	179	-51

Team #1	Score	Team #2
BC Enisey Krasnoyarsk (Russia)	83 – 66	(Poland) BC Anwil
BC Anwil (Poland)	94 – 72	(Finland) Torpan Pojat
Torpan Pojat (Finland)	56 – 85	(Russia) BC Enisey Krasnoyarsk

=== Group B ===
	Team	Pld	W	L	PF	PA	Diff
1.	(Russia) Krasnye Krylya Samara	2	2	0	196	161	+35
2.	(Ukraine) BC Dnipro	2	1	1	171	182	-9
3.	(Lithuania) BC Šiauliai	2	0	2	162	186	-24

Team #1	Score	Team #2
Krasnye Krylya Samara (Russia)	98 – 78	(Lithuania) BC Šiauliai
BC Šiauliai (Lithuania)	84 – 88	(Ukraine) BC Dnipro
BC Dnipro (Ukraine)	83 – 98	(Russia) Krasnye Krylya Samara

=== Final round ===
	Team	Pld	W	L	PF	PA	Diff
1.	(Russia) Krasnye Krylya Samara	2	2	0	283	245	+38
2.	(Russia) BC Enisey Krasnoyarsk	2	1	1	249	227	+22
3.	(Ukraine) BC Dnipro	2	1	1	237	250	-13
4.	(Poland) BC Anwil	2	0	2	214	261	-47

Team #1	Score	Team #2
BC Enisey Krasnoyarsk (Russia)	83 – 75	(Ukraine) BC Dnipro
BC Anwil (Poland)	79 – 99	(Russia) Krasnye Krylya Samara
BC Enisey Krasnoyarsk (Russia)	83 – 86	(Russia) Krasnye Krylya Samara
BC Anwil (Poland)	69 – 79	(Ukraine) BC Dnipro

== Regular season ==
Key to colors
First places in each group advances to Final Four
Teams ranked 2nd in each group advance to 1/4 final
Teams ranked 3rd and 4th in each group advance to 1/8 final

=== Group A ===
	Team	Pld	W	L	PF	PA	Diff
1.	(Russia) UNICS Kazan	16	14	2	1229	1025	+204
2.	(Russia) Khimki Moscow Region	16	12	4	1299	1169	+130
3.	(Lithuania) Žalgiris Kaunas	16	9	7	1297	1219	+78
4.	(Russia) BC Nizhny Novgorod	16	8	8	1272	1256	+16
5.	(Latvia) VEF Rīga	16	8	8	1240	1284	−44
6.	(Russia) Krasnye Krylya Samara	16	7	9	1172	1194	−22
7.	(Kazakhstan) BC Astana	16	7	9	1199	1274	−75
8.	(Ukraine) BC Budivelnyk	16	5	11	1201	1271	−70
9.	(Estonia) Kalev Tallinn	16	2	14	1118	1335	−217

	UNICS Kazan	Žalgiris Kaunas	Kalev Tallinn	Astana Tigers	VEF Rīga	Khimki	Krasnye Krylya	BC Budivelnyk	Nizhny Novgorod
UNICS Kazan	–	79–52	100–55	77–63	67–50	65–69	76–65	61–58	83–57
Žalgiris Kaunas	73–77	–	97–65	82–66	93–56	95–94	84–82	74–58	86–92
Kalev Tallinn	64–73	70–84	–	73–75	71–78	68–100	63–77	81–73	62–92
Astana Tigers	68–87	86–78	92–72	–	73–83	84–73	76–81	91–85	63–75
VEF Rīga	85–99	88–79	103–89	84–62	–	75–85	67–59	68–60	92–97
Khimki	76–74	83–72	76–65	85–66	77–54	–	67–68	90–94	84–73
Krasnye Krylya	55–66	59–79	81–76	99–72	72–80	64–68	–	90–89	75–70
BC Budivelnyk	70–72	79–90	51–65	71–82	99–89	75–92	80–72	–	80–76
Nizhny Novgorod	65–73	85–79	83–72	69–80	102–88	77–79	81–73	78–79	–

=== Group B ===
	Team	Pld	W	L	PF	PA	Diff
1.	(Russia) CSKA Moscow	16	14	2	1299	1023	+276
2.	(Russia) Spartak Saint Petersburg	16	11	5	1159	1075	+84
3.	(Lithuania) Lietuvos Rytas Vilnius	16	10	6	1251	1154	+97
4.	(Russia) Lokomotiv–Kuban Krasnodar	16	9	7	1212	1197	+15
5.	(Czech Republic) ČEZ Basketball Nymburk	16	8	8	1219	1200	+19
6.	(Poland) Asseco Prokom Gdynia	16	8	8	1165	1148	+17
7.	(Ukraine) Azovmash Mariupol	16	8	8	1155	1170	−15
8.	(Russia) BC Enisey Krasnoyarsk	16	3	13	1170	1324	−154
9.	(Belarus) Minsk-2006 Minsk	16	1	15	1166	1505	−339

	CSKA Moscow	Lokomotiv–Kuban	Enisey	Spartak St Pet.	Prokom Gdynia	Lietuvos Rytas	Azovmash	ČEZ Nymburk	Minsk-2006
CSKA Moscow	–	88–73	92–60	74–53	86–81	89–75	72–45	80–69	110–60
Lokomotiv–Kuban	64–77	–	74–56	85–77	79–66	71–78	84–76	72–63	87–64
Enisey	60–74	83–67	–	70–91	102–79	75–82	70–84	66–69	99–89
Spartak St Pet.	83–81	86–74	61–59	–	45–50	72–65	57–48	79–62	90–64
Prokom Gdynia	65–74	72–81	89–73	67–77	–	74–73	68–53	77–66	89–79
Lietuvos Rytas	67–84	84–63	101–62	72–61	59–54	–	72–61	78–72	112–86
Azovmash	37–62	79–78	95–74	64–66	66–74	83–73	–	85–76	95–77
ČEZ Nymburk	79–60	65–71	86–77	74–73	75–68	80–73	86–94	–	105–63
Minsk-2006	52–96	83–89	91–84	66–88	60–92	67–87	81–90	84–92	–

== Playoff round ==
=== 1/8 Final ===
The teams that finished third in their group play against the fourth placed teams in the other group in a Best-Of-3 series with home advantage.

			Series	1	2	3
Zalgiris Kaunas (Lithuania)	−	(Russia) Lokomotiv–Kuban Krasnodar	0−2	44–72	71–80	(canceled)
Lietuvos Rytas Vilnius (Lithuania)	−	(Russia) BC Nizhny Novgorod	2−0	64–60	82–61	(canceled)

=== 1/4 Final ===
The teams that finished second in their group play against the winners of the 1/8 final in a Best-Of-3 series with home advantage.

			Series	1	2	3
Khimki Moscow Region (Russia)	−	(Lithuania) Lietuvos Rytas Vilnius	1−2	71−82	80−62	78−103
Spartak Saint Petersburg (Russia)	−	(Russia) Lokomotiv–Kuban Krasnodar	0−2	57−71	60−69	(canceled)

== Final four ==
Semifinals; 2 May
(Russia) UNICS Kazan	87
(Russia) Lokomotiv–Kuban Krasnodar	86
(Russia) CSKA Moscow	79
(Lithuania) Lietuvos Rytas Vilnius	72

Final; 3 May
(Russia) UNICS Kazan	62
(Russia) CSKA Moscow	74
Third place
(Russia) Lokomotiv–Kuban Krasnodar	83
(Lithuania) Lietuvos Rytas Vilnius	91

=== Semifinals ===
2 May 2012

UNICS Kazan (Russia)	87–86	(Russia) Lokomotiv–Kuban Krasnodar

2 May 2012

CSKA Moscow (Russia)	79–72	(Lithuania) Lietuvos Rytas Vilnius

=== Third-place game ===
3 May 2012

Lokomotiv–Kuban Krasnodar (Russia)	83–91	(Lithuania) Lietuvos Rytas Vilnius

=== Final ===
3 May 2012

CSKA Moscow (Russia)	74–62	UNICS Kazan (Russia)

== Awards ==
=== MVP of the Month ===
- October 2011: Patrick Beverley (Spartak St. Petersburg)
- November 2011: Rawle Marshall (Astana)
- December 2011: Tre Simmons (CEZ Nymburk)
- January 2012: Michał Ignerski (Nizhny Novgorod)
- February 2012: Jonas Valančiūnas (Lietuvos Rytas)
- March 2012: Vladimir Veremeenko (UNICS Kazan)
- April 2012: Jeremiah Massey (Lokomotiv Kuban)

=== All-Tournament First Team ===
- Patrick Beverley (Spartak St. Petersburg)
- Henry Domercant (UNICS Kazan)
- Andrei Kirilenko (CSKA Moscow)
- Krešimir Lončar (Khimki Moscow Region)
- Jonas Valančiūnas (Lietuvos Rytas)

=== All-Tournament Second Team ===
- Tyrese Rice (Lietuvos Rytas)
- Tre Simmons (CEZ Nymburk)
- Jeremiah Massey (Lokomotiv Kuban)
- Paulius Jankūnas (Zalgiris)
- Donatas Motiejūnas (Asseco Prokom)

=== All-Final Four Team ===
- Henry Domercant (UNICS Kazan)
- K.C. Rivers (Lokomotiv Kuban)
- Andrei Kirilenko (CSKA Moscow)
- Darjuš Lavrinovič (CSKA Moscow)
- Jonas Valančiūnas (Lietuvos Rytas)

=== MVPs ===
Regular Season MVP		Final Four MVP	
MVP	Team	MVP	Team
(Russia) Andrei Kirilenko	(Russia) CSKA Moscow	(Russia) Andrei Kirilenko	(Russia) CSKA Moscow
