= Basket-Hall Kazan =

Indoor arena in Kazan, Tatarstan, Russia

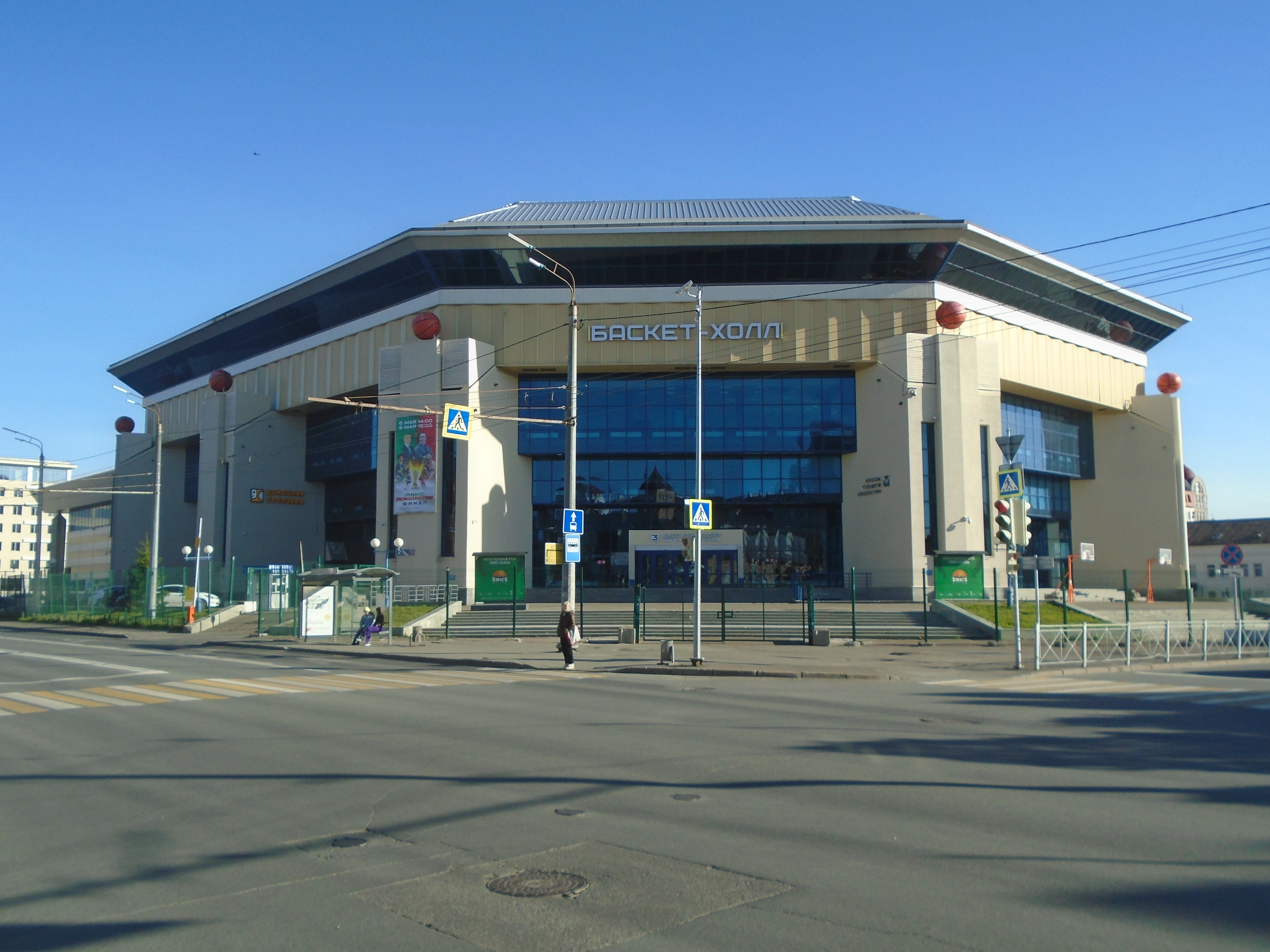
- Interactive map of Basket-Hall Kazan
- Full name: Basket-Hall Arena Kazan
- Location: 1 Spartakovskaya str., Kazan, Russia
- Coordinates: 55°46′54.83″N 49°7′37.03″E
- Capacity: Basket-Hall Kazan 1: 7,482 (basketball); 8,000 (concerts); Basket-Hall Kazan 2: 1,500 (basketball)
- Surface: Parquet

Construction
- Opened: August 2003
- Renovated: 2017
- Cost: $14 million
- Architect: Tatinvestgrazhdanproject

Tenant
- UNICS Kazan (2003–present)

Basket-Hall Kazan (Russian: Баскет-холл Казань) is a basketball specialized indoor arena that is located in Kazan, Russia. It is primarily used for basketball, but it can also be used for volleyball and concerts. It contains two basketball halls.

The large main hall, called Basket-Hall 1, has a seating capacity of 7,482 people for basketball and 8,000 for concerts. The large main hall also includes an amphitheater section. The small hall, called Basket-Hall 2, which is mainly used for training, has a seating capacity of 1,500.

== History ==
The arena opened in August 2003, at a construction cost of $14 million. In 2011, it hosted the 2011 European Weightlifting Championships. Basket-Hall was also a venue of the 2013 Summer Universiade. The arena has been used as the regular home arena of the Russian VTB United League basketball club UNICS Kazan. It was also previously used by the Russian volleyball club VC Zenit-Kazan.

The arena was renovated in 2017.

== See also ==
- List of indoor arenas in Russia

Events and tenants
Preceded by PalaLottomatica; Rome	CEV Champions League; Final Venue; 2018	Succeeded by Max-Schmeling-Halle; Berlin
