= VTB United League =

- Founded: 2009; 17 years ago
- First season: 2009–10
- Country: Russia
- Confederation: FIBA Europe; FIBA Asia
- Number of teams: 11
- Level on pyramid: 1
- Domestic cup: Russian Cup
- Supercup: VTB League Supercup
- International cup: West Asia Super League
- Current champions: CSKA Moscow (13th title) (2025–26)
- Most championships: CSKA Moscow (13 titles)
- Website: vtb-league.com
- 2026-27

The VTB United League (Russian: Единая Лига ВТБ) is an international professional men's club basketball league that was founded in 2009. As of the 2025–26 season, it consists exclusively of Russian clubs. Since 2013, it is the first tier of Russian professional club basketball. Therefore, the highest placed Russian team in the league can also be named the Russian national champions. The league is sponsored by Russian state-owned VTB Bank. In 2009 CSKA Moscow won VTB United League Promo-Cup, but this competition does not count as official VTB title. CSKA has dominated the league, having won majority of titles its existence. The VTB United League also holds a youth competition, the VTB United Youth League.

== History ==
The first step in the creation of the league was a competition named the VTB United League Promo-Cup held in Moscow in December 2009. The final of the Promo-Cup was played on December 22, 2009, and was won by CSKA Moscow, who defeated Khimki 70–66. Kyiv ended third.

=== Unification with the Russian PBL ===
In May 2012, all the Russian Professional Basketball League clubs gathered to decide which format would be used for the next season, and some club's directors raised the possibility of uniting with the VTB United League, to produce greater competition between the Russian basketball clubs. They suggested that the new league be named the Eastern European Professional Basketball League.

In July 2012, the Council of VTB United League decided that the PBL league would continue for one more year, with some games of the VTB United League that took place between two Russian clubs being counted as PBL games. The first tier Russian clubs then replaced the PBL with the VTB United League as their new national domestic league, starting with the 2013-14 season.

The VTB United League was recognized by FIBA Europe in September 2013. The league was then officially recognized by FIBA World in October 2014. The league needed to be recognized by both bodies, because it contains clubs that come from countries that are part of both the European and Asian FIBA zones.

The honorary head of the league is Sergei Ivanov and its official sponsor is Pavel Vrublevsky of ChronoPay.

== Formats ==
In its inaugural 2009–10 season, the VTB United League featured clubs from Estonia, Latvia, Lithuania, Russia, and Ukraine. For the 2010–11 season, teams from Belarus, Finland, and Poland were added to the league. The 2011–12 season featured 18 teams, with new teams being added from the Czech Republic and Kazakhstan. In the 2012–13 season, the number of teams increased to 20. The number of teams decreased to 16 for the 2014–15 season, and the teams from Lithuania and Ukraine dropped out of the league.

During the 2021–22 season, ten teams were left to compete after the Polish and Estonian clubs withdrew from the league in protest against the Russian invasion of Ukraine.

As of the 2025–26 season, the VTB United League consisted of 11 teams:

Team	Home city
(Russian Basketball Federation) BC Avtodor	Saratov
(Russian Basketball Federation) PBC CSKA Moscow	Moscow
(Russian Basketball Federation) BC Enisey	Krasnoyarsk
(Russian Basketball Federation) PBC Lokomotiv Kuban	Krasnodar
(Russian Basketball Federation) BC Parma	Perm
(Russian Basketball Federation) MBA Moscow	Moscow
(Russian Basketball Federation) BC Nizhny Novgorod	Nizhny Novgorod
(Russian Basketball Federation) BC Samara	Samara
(Russian Basketball Federation) BC UNICS	Kazan
(Russian Basketball Federation) BC Uralmash Yekaterinburg	Yekaterinburg
(Russian Basketball Federation) BC Zenit Saint Petersburg	Saint Petersburg

== Arena rules ==
In order for clubs to play in the VTB United League, they must have a home arena that has a seating capacity of at least 3,000 seats.

== Team appearances ==
Participants	2008	09–10	10–11	11–12	12–13	13–14	14–15	15–16	16–17	17–18	18–19	19–20	20–21	21–22	22–23	23–24	24–25	25–26
Participants	8	8	12	18	20	20	16	16	13	13	14	13	13	12	12	14	12	11
(Belarus) Minsk			GS	GS	GS	GS	14th	12th	12th	9th	14th	(13th)	13th	9th	12th	14th		
(Czech Republic) Nymburk				GS	GS	GS	15th	QF										
(Estonia) Kalev		GS		GS	GS	GS	9th	14th	11th	12th	QF	(8th)	10th	Ret				
(Finland) Bisons Loimaa							13th	13th										
(Finland) Espoon Honka			GS															
(Finland) Torpan Pojat				QR														
(Georgia (country)) VITA Tbilisi								16th										
(Kazakhstan) Astana					1/8	1/8	QF	15th	QF	10th	QF	(9th)	12th	10th	11th	13th	12th	
(Latvia) ASK Rīga	7th																	
(Latvia) VEF Rīga		GS	GS		QF	GS	GS	11th	QF	QF	10th							
(Lithuania) Lietuvos rytas			GS	3rd	GS	SF												
(Lithuania) Neptūnas					GS	GS												
(Lithuania) Šiauliai				QR														
(Lithuania) Žalgiris	5th	3rd	1/8	1/8	3rd													
(Poland) Anwil				QR														
(Poland) Prokom	8th		GS	GS														
(Poland) Turów					GS	GS												
(Poland) Zielona Góra											12th	(7th)	QF	Ret				
(Russia) Avtodor							QF	QF	10th	QF	11th	(12th)	9th	QF	QF	9th	QF	10th
(Russia) CSKA Moscow	1st	1st	2nd	1st	1st	1st	1st	1st	1st	1st	1st	(2nd)	1st	2nd	3rd	1st	1st	1st
(Russia) Dynamo Moscow	4th																	
(Russia) Enisey				GS	GS	1/8	11th	10th	QF	13th	9th	(11th)	11th	QF	9th	QF	10th	QF
(Russia) Khimki	2nd	4th	1st	QF	4th	QF	2nd	SF	2nd	2nd	2nd	(1st)	QF					
(Russia) Krasny Oktyabr						1/8	12th	9th										
(Russia) Krasnye Krylia				GS	QF	QF	16th											
(Russia) Lokomotiv Kuban				4th	2nd	QF	SF	QF	SF	QF	QF	(3rd)	SF	4th	2nd	4th	4th	3rd
(Russia) MBA Moscow															QF	10th	9th	QF
(Russia) Nizhny Novgorod				1/8	QF	2nd	SF	QF	9th	QF	QF	(10th)	QF	QF	QF	12th	QF	9th
(Russia) Parma									13th	11th	13th	(5th)	QF	QF	QF	QF	QF	QF
(Russia) Samara															10th	QF	11th	11th
(Russia) Spartak				QF	1/8	1/8												
(Russia) Triumph					1/8	QF												
(Russia) UNICS		2nd	3rd	2nd	QF	SF	QF	2nd	QF	4th	SF	(4th)	2nd	3rd	1st	2nd	3rd	2nd
(Russia) Uralmash																QF	QF	QF
(Russia) Zenit							QF	SF	SF	3rd	SF	(6th)	SF	1st	4th	3rd	2nd	4th
(Ukraine) Azovmash	6th	GS	4th	GS	GS	GS												
(Ukraine) Budivelnyk				GS														
(Ukraine) Dnipro			GS	QR														
(Ukraine) Donetsk		GS			1/8	GS												
(Ukraine) Kyiv	3rd																	

== Results ==
Key to colors
VTB United League Promo-Cup

Season	Finals & Final four hosts	Finals			Third Place Playoff		
Season	Finals & Final four hosts	Gold	Score	Silver	Bronze	Score	Fourth place
2008; Details	Russia (USK CSKA, Moscow) ^{†}	CSKA Moscow	70–66	Khimki	Kyiv	86–73	Dynamo Moscow
2009–10; Details	Lithuania (Sports Hall, Kaunas)	CSKA Moscow	66–55	UNICS	Žalgiris	78–72	Khimki
2010–11; Details	Russia (Basket Hall, Kazan)	Khimki	66–64	CSKA Moscow	UNICS	95–75	Azovmash
2011–12; Details	Lithuania (Siemens Arena, Vilnius)	CSKA Moscow	74–62	UNICS	Lietuvos rytas	91–83	Lokomotiv Kuban
2012–13; Details	In home and away venues	CSKA Moscow	3–1; Series	Lokomotiv Kuban	Žalgiris	Did not play	Khimki
2013–14; Details	In home and away venues	CSKA Moscow	3–0; Series	Nizhny Novgorod	UNICS	Did not play	Lietuvos rytas
2014–15; Details	In home and away venues	CSKA Moscow	3–0; Series	Khimki	Lokomotiv Kuban	Did not play	Nizhny Novgorod
2015–16; Details	In home and away venues	CSKA Moscow	3–1; Series	UNICS	Zenit Saint Petersburg	Did not play	Khimki
2016–17; Details	In home and away venues	CSKA Moscow	3–0; Series	Khimki	Zenit Saint Petersburg	Did not play	Lokomotiv Kuban
2017–18; Details	Russia (VTB Ice Palace, Moscow)	CSKA Moscow	95–84	Khimki	Zenit Saint Petersburg	93–79	UNICS
2018–19; Details	In home and away venues	CSKA Moscow	3–0; Series	Khimki	UNICS	Did not play	Zenit Saint Petersburg
2019–20; Details	Cancelled due to the COVID-19 pandemic - no champion announced.						
2020–21; Details	In home and away venues	CSKA Moscow	3–0; Series	UNICS	Lokomotiv Kuban	Did not play	Zenit Saint Petersburg
2021–22; Details	In home and away venues	Zenit Saint Petersburg	4–3; Series	CSKA Moscow	UNICS	3–1; Series	Lokomotiv Kuban
2022–23; Details	In home and away venues	UNICS	4–1; Series	Lokomotiv Kuban	CSKA Moscow	4–1; Series	Zenit Saint Petersburg
2023–24	In home and away venues	CSKA Moscow	4–1; Series	UNICS	Zenit Saint Petersburg	3–1; Series	Lokomotiv Kuban
2024–25	In home and away venues	CSKA Moscow	4–2; Series	Zenit Saint Petersburg	UNICS	3–1; Series	Lokomotiv Kuban
2025–26	In home and away venues	CSKA Moscow	4–0; Series	UNICS	Lokomotiv Kuban	3–2; Series	Zenit Saint Petersburg

^† The whole 2008 tournament was staged in Moscow, including the Final Four.

2008 tournament does not count as official VTB title.

=== Titles by club ===
Club	Champions	Runners-up	Winning years
CSKA Moscow	13	2	2010, 2012-19, 2021, 2024-26
Khimki	1	4	2011
UNICS	1	6	2023
Zenit Saint Petersburg	1	1	2022
Lokomotiv Kuban	0	2	
Nizhny Novgorod	0	1	

== Major awards ==
- Hall of Fame
- Most Valuable Player
- Playoffs MVP
- Coach of the Year
- Young Player of the Year
- Sixth Man of the Year
- Defensive Player of the Year

== Awards by nationality ==
- Top Belarusian player
- Top Estonian player
- Top Kazakh player
- Top Latvian player
- Top Russian player

== Statistical awards ==
- Scoring leader
- Rebounding leader
- Assist leader
- Steals leader
- Block leader
- Free throw percentage leader

== Sponsorship ==
Andrey Kostin's VTB Bank has been a long-term league sponsor. However, it recorded losses of connected to other sponsorships (FC Dynamo Moscow and HC Dynamo Moscow) and contributions to charities. This led to the Bank of Moscow joining as main sponsor.

== Predecessor leagues ==
- USSR Premier League: (1923–1992)
- Russian Super League 1 (1st-tier): (1992–2010)
- Russian Professional League: (2010–2013)

== See also ==
- VTB United League All-Star Game
- List of VTB United League season scoring leaders
- Russian Professional Championship: (1991–present)
- Russian Professional League: (2010–2013)
- Russian Super League 1: (1992–present)
- Russian Cup: (1999–present)
- USSR Cup: (1949–1987)
- Russian basketball league system
- Basketball in Russia
- Adriatic League
- Baltic League
- Belarusian Premier League
- Kazakhstan Championship
