= Bogić Vujošević =

Serbian-Austrian basketball player

No. 5 – Vienna
- Position: Point guard
- League: Austrian Superliga

Personal information
- Born: 5 August 1992 (age 34) Vrbas, Serbia, FR Yugoslavia
- Listed height: 1.92 m (6 ft 4 in)
- Listed weight: 85 kg (187 lb)

Career information
- NBA draft: 2014: undrafted
- Playing career: 2009–present

Career history
- 2009–2011: Novi Sad
- 2011–2012: Vojvodina Srbijagas
- 2012–2013: Radnički Beograd
- 2013–2014: Crnokosa
- 2014–2015: Oberwart Gunners
- 2015–2016: Hallmann Vienna
- 2016–2020: Kapfenberg Bulls
- 2020–2021: Okapi Aalst
- 2021–present: GGMT Vienna
Medals
Men's basketball
Representing Serbia
U19 World Championship
Silver medal – second place	2011 Latvia	U-19 Team

Bogić Vujošević (Serbian Cyrillic: Богић Вујошевић; born 5 August 1992) is a Serbian–Austrian professional basketball player for Vienna of the Austrian Basketball Superliga. Standing at 1.92 m (6 ft 4 in) and weighing 85 kilograms (187 lb), he plays point guard position. He represents the Austria national team internationally.

== Professional career ==
Vujošević played for Novi Sad, Vojvodina Srbijagas, Radnički Beograd, and Crnokosa in Serbia.

In 2014, he moved to Austria where he played for Oberwart Gunners, Vienna, and Kapfenberg Bulls.

Vujošević played for Okapi Aalst of the Belgian Pro Basketball League during the 2020–21 season.

In September 2021, Vujošević returned to Vienna.

== National team career ==
In August 2008, Vujošević was a member of the Serbia U16 national team that finished the fifth at the FIBA Europe Under-16 Championship in Chieti, Italy. Over five tournament games, he averaged 2.2 points and four rebounds per game. In July/August 2010, Vujošević was a member of the Serbia under-18 national team that finished the fourth at the FIBA Europe Under-18 Championship in Vilnius, Lithuania. Over nine tournament games, he averaged 6.6 points, three rebounds, and 2.7 assists per game. In June/July 2011, Vujošević was a member of the Serbia U19 national team that won a silver medal at the FIBA Under-19 Basketball World Cup in Latvia. Over nine tournament games, he averaged 8.0 points, 1.3 rebounds, and 1.6 assists per game.

Vujošević was a member of the Austria national team at the EuroBasket 2022 qualification and the EuroBasket 2025 qualification.

== Career achievements and awards ==
- Austrian Bundesliga / Austrian Superliga champion: 4 (with Kapfenberg Bulls: 2016–17, 2017–18, 2018–19; with Vienna: 2021–22)
- Austrian Cup winner: 4 (with Kapfenberg Bulls: 2017, 2018, 2019, 2020)
- Austrian Basketball Supercup winner: 5 (with Vienna: 2015; with Kapfenberg Bulls: 2017, 2018, 2019, 2020)

Individual awards

- Austrian Bundesliga Finals MVP (2) – 2017, 2018
- Austrian Superliga Finals MVP – 2022
- Austrian Cup MVP (2) – 2017, 2018
