= List of ÖBL season scoring leaders =

This pages contains a List of Österreichische Basketball Bundesliga (ÖBL) season scoring leaders.

== Leaders ==
Key
Player (X)	Name of the player and number of times they had won the award at that point (if more than one)
Games	The number of ÖBL games played by the winner that season
PPG	The players' points per game
†	Indicates co-leaders in the same season
§	Denotes the club were ÖBL champions in the same season

ÖBL Scoring champions
Season	Player	Nationality	Club	PPG	Games	Ref(s)
2014–15	Marko Car	Croatia	Panthers Fürstenfeld	20.4	24	
2015–16	Fabricio Vay	Argentina	Arkadia Traiskirchen Lions	20.4	24	
2016–17	Marko Car (2)	Croatia	Panthers Fürstenfeld	20.5	25	
2017–18	Darien Nelson-Henry	Austria	Kapfenberg Bulls	19.8	46	
2018–19	Jason Detrick	United States	BC Hallmann Vienna	26.6	40	
