= Adomas Drungilas =

Lithuanian basketball player

No. 15 – Tindastóll
- Position: Forward / center
- League: Úrvalsdeild karla

Personal information
- Born: 6 October 1990 (age 36)
- Listed height: 206 cm (6 ft 9 in)
- Listed weight: 92 kg (203 lb)

Career information
- Playing career: 2008–present

Career history
- 2008–2009: Kaunas Triobet
- 2009–2010: BC Žalgiris-2
- 2010–2011: LSU-Atletas
- 2011–2013: Lietkabelis
- 2013–2014: Starwings Basel
- 2014–2015: Palangos Kuršiai
- 2015–2016: Oberwart Gunners
- 2016–2017: ZTE KK
- 2017: Latina
- 2017–2018: U-BT Cluj-Napoca
- 2018–2019: AS Kaysersberg
- 2019–2020: Tartu Ülikool
- 2020–2021: Þór Þorlákshöfn
- 2021–2022: Tartu Ülikool
- 2022–present: Tindastóll

Career highlights
- 2×Icelandic champion (2021, 2023); Austrian champion (2016); Austrian Cup winner (2016); Romanian Cup winner (2018); Úrvalsdeild Playoffs MVP (2021); Austrian Cup Final Four MVP (2016)

Adomas Drungilas (born 6 October 1990) is a Lithuanian professional basketball player. In 2021, he won the Icelandic championship with Þór Þorlákshöfn where he was named the Úrvalsdeild Playoffs MVP. In 2016, he won the Austrian Basketball Bundesliga and Austrian Cup with Oberwart Gunners and was named the Cup Final Four MVP. In 2018, he won the Romanian Cup with U-BT Cluj-Napoca. In 2023, he won his second Icelandic championship, this time with Tindastóll.

== Playing career ==
In 2015, Drungilas signed with Oberwart Gunners of the Austrian Basketball Bundesliga. In January 2016, he won the Austrian Cup with Oberwart Gunners and was named the Cup Final Four MVP. In March 2016, he was suspended for eight games for hitting Cody Larson of UBC Güssing Knights in the crotch in revenge for Larson hitting him earlier in the game. Following the Gunners semi-finals win against BC Vienna in the Bundesliga playoffs, Vienna's captain Stjepan Stazić was suspended for ten games after he threw the ball into Drungilas face and spat in his direction. On 31 May 2016, he won the Austrian Basketball Bundesliga championship with Oberwart after it defeated Raiffeisen Flyers Wels 3–0 in the finals.

In November 2017, he signed with reigning Romanian Liga Națională champions U-BT Cluj-Napoca. In his debut with Cluj-Napoca, he had 11 points and 6 rebounds in 17 minutes of playing time. In February 2018, he helped the team win the Romanian Cup for the second consecutive year, defeating CSM U Oradea in the Cup final.

In August 2020, Drungilas signed with Úrvalsdeild karla club Þór Þorlákshöfn. In March 2021, he was suspended for one game for striking Haukar's Breki Gylfason in the head. Later the same month, he was suspended for two games after elbowing Stjarnan's Mirza Sarajlija in the head. In May 2021, Drungilas was suspended for three games for elbowing Guy Edi of Þór Akureyri in the head.

Due to the suspension, he missed the first three games in the first round playoffs matchup against Þór Akureyri. He returned in game four, scoring 8 points and grabbing 10 rebounds in Þorlákshöfn 98–66 series clinching win. In the semi-finals, Þór faced Stjarnan and defeated them in five games. In the series clinching game, Drungilas scored 7 points and grabbed 24 rebounds. In the Úrvalsdeild finals, Þór faced top-seeded and favorites Keflavík. Þór dominated game one of the series with Drungilas finishing with 15 points, 7 rebounds and 6 assists. In the game, Keflavík's Arnór Sveinsson was disqualified for throwing an elbow to Drungilas and later suspended for one game. In game two, Drungilas scored a game high 29 points, hitting 6 three pointers, in Þór's 88–83 victory. After Keflavík won game three convincingly, the teams faced in Þorlákshöfn for game four where Þór dominated in the fourth quarter and won its first ever national championship. In the game, Drungilas had 24 points, including 6 three pointers, and 11 rebounds and was named the Úrvalsdeild Playoffs MVP.

After spending the 2021–2022 season with Tartu Ülikool in the Latvian-Estonian Basketball League, Drungilas returned to the Úrvalsdeild and signed with Tindastóll in June 2022. On 18 May 2023, he won his second Icelandic championship after Tindastóll defeated Valur 3–2 in a finals rematch. Following the season, he signed a two-year contract extension with Tindastóll.

In October 2026, Drungilas suffered two fractures in his heel bone after landing badly in a game against Njarðvík.

== Awards and accomplishments ==
=== Titles ===
- Icelandic champion: 2021, 2023
- Austrian champion: 2016
- Austrian Cup: 2016
- Romanian Cup: 2018

=== Individual awards ===
- Úrvalsdeild Playoffs MVP: 2021
- Austrian Cup Final Four MVP: 2016
