= ÖBL Most Valuable Player =

The Österreichische Basketball Bundesliga (ÖBL) Most Valuable Player is an award given to the best player in the Österreichische Basketball Bundesliga, the highest professional basketball league in Austria.

== Winners ==
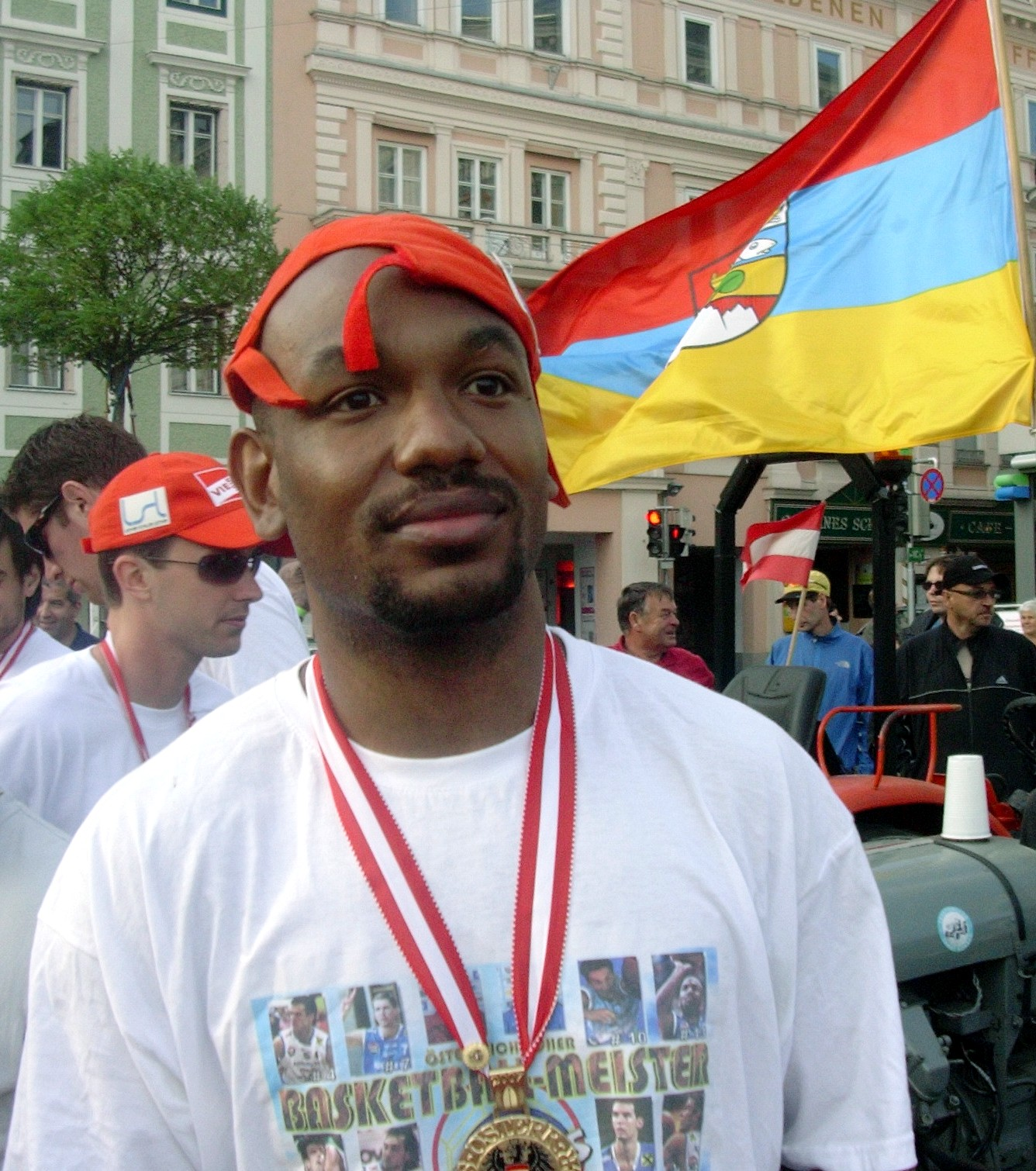
De'Teri Mayes, a five-time MVP winner

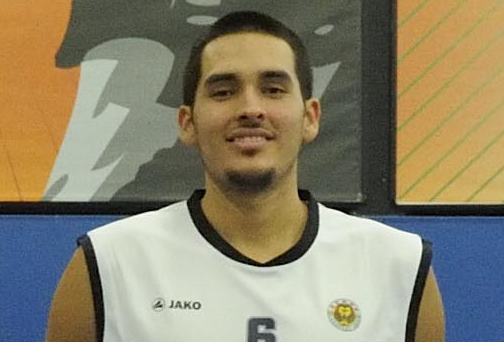
Mark Sanchez won MVP in 2014

Key
Player (X)	Name of the player and number of times they had won the award at that point (if more than one)
§	Denotes the club was Bundesliga champions in the same season

Season	Player	Pos.	Nat.	Team	Ref.
2002–03	De'Teri Mayes	SG	(Austria) (Note: De'Tery Mayes was born in the United States, but later also got the Austrian nationality.)	Allianz Swans Gmunden	
2003–04	De'Teri Mayes (2×)	SG	(Austria)	Allianz Swans Gmunden	
2004–05	Jason Detrick	SF	(Austria) (Note: Jason Detrick was born in the United States, but later also got the Austrian nationality.)	Oberwart Gunners	
2005–06	De'Teri Mayes (3×)	SG	(Austria)	Allianz Swans Gmunden^{§}	
2006–07	De'Teri Mayes (4×)	SG	(Austria)	Allianz Swans Gmunden^{§}	
2007–08	Jay Youngblood	SG	(United States)	Oberwart Gunners	
2008–09	Deven Mitchell	SF	(United States)	Arkadia Traiskirchen Lions	
2009–10	De'Teri Mayes (5×)	SG	(Austria)	Allianz Swans Gmunden^{§}	
2010–11	Fabricio Vay	PF	(Argentina) (Note: Fabricio Fay originally owns the Argentine nationality, but owns the Italian under the Bosman ruling.)	Arkadia Traiskirchen Lions	
2011–12	Sharaud Curry	PG	(United States)	Allianz Swans Gmunden	
2012–13	Seamus Boxley	PF	(United States)	Oberwart Gunners	
2013–14	Mark Sanchez	PF	(United States) (Note: Mark Sanchez also owns the Mexican nationality.)	ece Bulls Kapfenberg	
2014–15	Travis Taylor	PF	(United States)	Güssing Knights^{§}	
2015–16	Quincy Diggs	SF	(United States)	Oberwart Gunners^{§}	
2016–17	Predrag Miletić	SG	(Serbia)	Vienna	
2017–18	Stjepan Stazić	G	(Austria)	Vienna	
2018–19	Hayden Lescault	G	(United States)	Oberwart Gunners	
2019–20	Not awarded due to COVID-19 pandemic				
2020–21	Enis Murati	F	(Austria)	Swans Gmunden^{§}	

== Players with most awards ==
Player	Editions	Notes
(United States) (Austria) De'Teri Mayes	5	2003, 2004, 2006, 2007, 2010

== Awards won by nationality ==
Country	Total
United States	8
Austria	8
Argentina	1
Serbia	1

== Awards won by club ==
Country	Total
Swans Gmunden	7
Oberwart Gunners	5
Arkadia Traiskirchen Lions	2
Vienna	2
ece Bulls Kapfenberg	1
Güssing Knights	1
