= ÖBL Finals MVP =

The Österreichische Basketball Bundesliga (ÖBL) Finals MVP is the award, given to the best player in the ÖBL Finals, the finals of the highest professional basketball league in Austria. The award was handed out for the first time in 2006.

== Winners ==
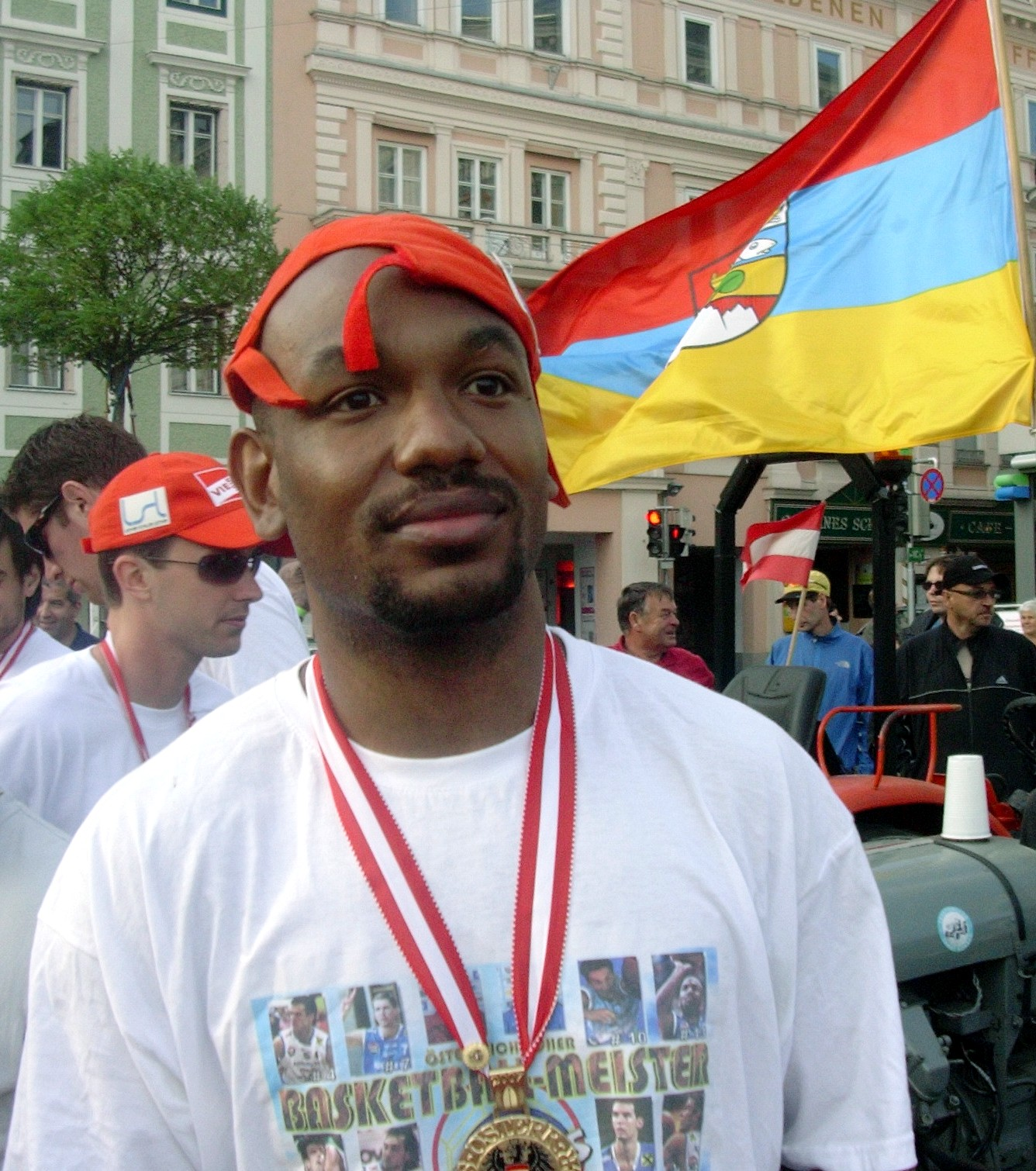
De'Teri Mayes won the award twice

Year	Player	Position	Nationality	Team
2006	Peter Hütter	SF	Austria	Allianz Swans Gmunden
2007	De'Teri Mayes	SG	Austria	Allianz Swans Gmunden
2008	Anthony Shavies	G	United States	Panthers Fürstenfeld
2009	Ricky Moore	G	United States	WBC Wels
2010	De'Teri Mayes (2×)	SG	Austria	Allianz Swans Gmunden
2011	Bernd Volcic	C	Austria	Oberwart Gunners
2012	Christoph Nagler	SF	Austria	Xion Dukes Klosterneuburg
2013	Shawn Ray	SF	United States	Zepter Vienna
2014	Anthony Shavies (2×)	G	United States	Güssing Knights
2015	Christopher Dunn	G	United States	Güssing Knights
2016	Chris McNealy	G	United States	Oberwart Gunners
2019	Elijah Wilson	G	United States	Kapfenberg Bulls
