= Anton Mirolybov =

Finnish basketball coach (born 1977)

Personal information
- Born: 7 July 1977 (age 49) Helsinki, Finland
- Listed height: 1.80 m (5 ft 11 in)
- Coaching career: 2002–present

Career history

Coaching
- 2002–2003: Torpan Pojat
- 2003–2004: Solna Vikings (youth)
- 2004–2005: JBA
- 2005: Kouvot
- 2005–2007: Mitteldeutscher BC (assistant)
- 2005–2007: Finland U16
- 2007–2008: Hertener Löwen
- 2008–2010: Chemnitz
- 2010–2011: Mitteldeutscher BC (assistant)
- 2010–2011: Mitteldeutscher BC
- 2010–2011: Finland U18 women
- 2011–2013: HBA-Märsky
- 2011–2014: Finland women
- 2013–2014: UBC Hannover
- 2014–2016: KTP-Basket
- 2014–2016: Finland U20
- 2016–2017: Uni-Riesen Leipzig
- 2017–2018: Kirchheim Knights
- 2019–2024: Swans Gmunden
- 2024–2025: HBA-Märsky
- 2025–2026: BC Kalev

Career highlights
- As head coach: 2x Austrian League champion (2021, 2023); Austrian Cup winner (2023); 3x Austrian Supercup winner (2021, 2022, 2023); FIBA U20B EuroBasket champion (2015); 2x Austrian League Coach of the Year (2021, 2023)

Anton Mirolybov (born 7 July 1977) is a Finnish professional basketball coach, who most recently served as head coach for BC Kalev of the Korvpalli Meistriliiga and Estonian-Latvian Basketball League.
