= ÖBL Coach of the Year =

The Österreichische Basketball Bundesliga (ÖBL) Coach of the Year is an award given to the best coach in the Österreichische Basketball Bundesliga, the highest professional basketball league in Austria.

== Winners ==
Key
Coach (X)	Name of the player and number of times they had won the award at that point (if more than one)
§	Denotes the club were Bundesliga champions in the same season

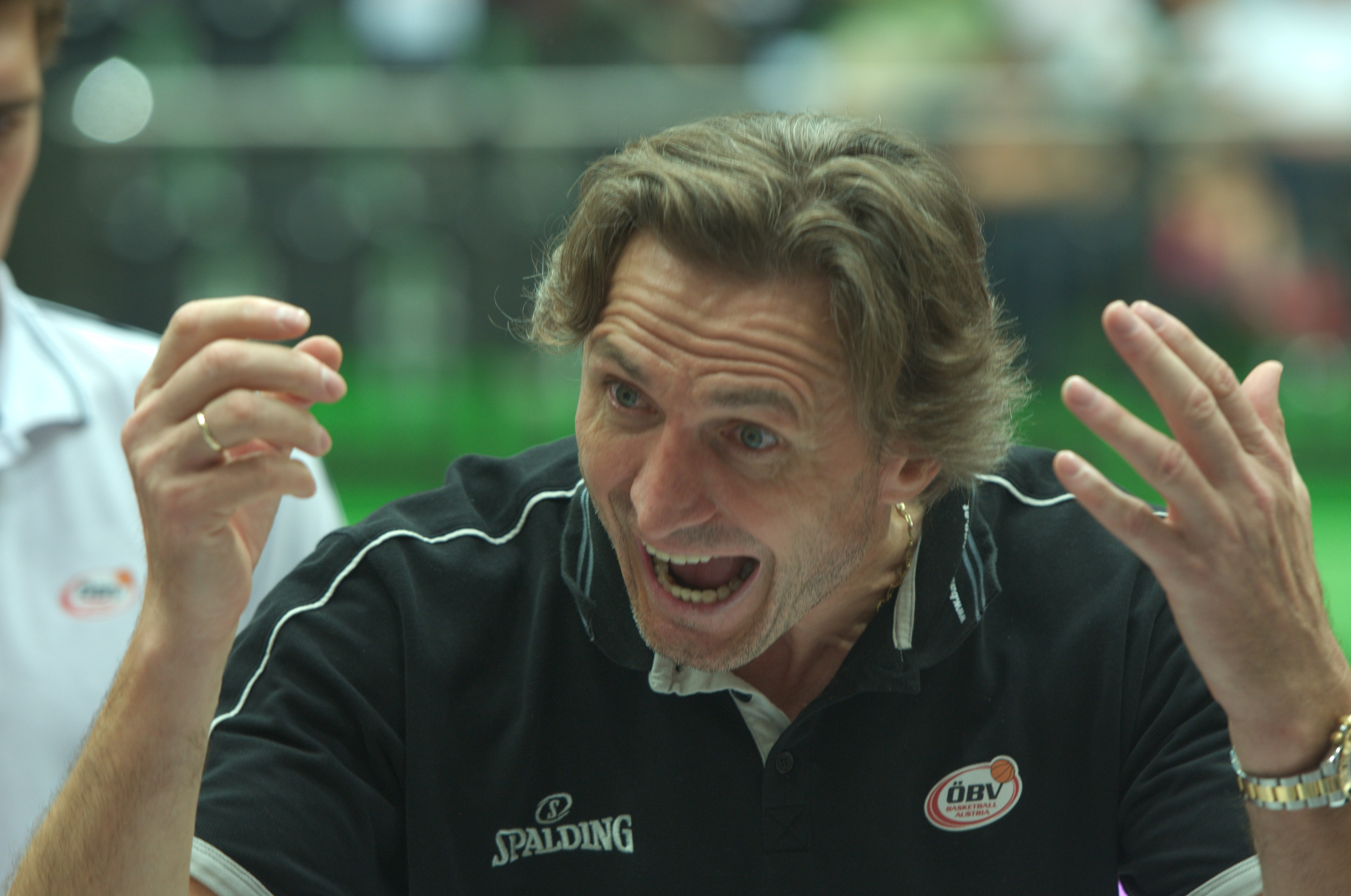
Neno Ašćerić, winner in 2011

Season	Coach	Nationality	Team
2002–03	Bob Gonnen	United States	Allianz Swans Gmunden
2003–04	Pit Stahl	Germany	Oberwart Gunners
2004–05	Bob Gonnen (2)	United States	Allianz Swans Gmunden^{§}
2005–06	Andrea Maghelli	Italy	Arkadia Traiskirchen Lions
2006–07	Bob Gonnen (3)	United States	Allianz Swans Gmunden^{§}
2007–08	Ante Perica	Croatia	Oberwart Gunners
2008–09	Bob Gonnen (4)	United States	Allianz Swans Gmunden^{§}
2009–10	Matthias Fischer	Germany	Allianz Swans Gmunden^{§}
2010–11	Neno Ašćerić	Austria	Oberwart Gunners^{§}
2011–12	Matthias Fischer (2)	Germany	Allianz Swans Gmunden
2012–13	Werner Sallomon	Austria	Xion Dukes Klosterneuburg
2013–14	Matthias Zollner	Germany	UBC magnofit Güssing Knights^{§}
2014–15	Matthias Zollner (2)	Germany	UBC magnofit Güssing Knights^{§}
2015–16	Chris Cougaz	Greece	Oberwart Gunners^{§}

== Awards won by nationality ==
Country	Total
Germany	5
United States	4
Austria	2
Italy	1
Croatia	1
Greece	1

== Awards won by club ==
Club	Total
Allianz Swans Gmunden	6
Oberwart Gunners	4
UBC magnofit Güssing Knights	2
Arkadia Traiskirchen Lions	1
Xion Dukes Klosterneuburg	1
