= 2013–14 Austrian Basketball Bundesliga =

ÖBL
- Season: 2013–14
- Games played: 30 (No. 1–6); 28 (No. 7–11)
- Teams: 11

Regular season
- Top seed: ece Bulls Kapfenbrg
- Season MVP: (United States) Mark Sanchez (KAP)

Finals
- Champions: magnofit Güssing Knights; 1st title
- Runners-up: ece Bulls Kapfenberg
- Semifinalists: Vienna; Raiffeisen Wels
- Finals MVP: (United States) Anthony Shavies (GÜS)

Awards
- Austrian MVP: (Austria) Martin Kohlmaier (KAP)
- Coach of the Year: (Germany) Matthias Zollner (GÜS)

Statistical leaders
Points	(Serbia) Zoran Krstanovic (OBE)	20.6
Rebounds	(Lithuania) Petras Balocka (FÜR)	9.8
Assists	(United States) Ian Boylan (KAP)	6.3
- All statistics correct as of 8 September 2014.

The 2013–14 Österreichische Basketball Bundesliga or Admiral Basketball Bundesliga, was the 68th season of the Österreichische Basketball Bundesliga. 11 teams participated this season.

UBC magnofit Güssing Knights won their first Bundesliga title in history, by beating ece Bulls Kapfenberg 3–2 in the Finals, despite not having home court advantage.

== Teams ==
Club	Place	Arena	Capacity
Allianz Swans Gmunden	Gmunden	Volksbank Arena	2,200
WBC Raiffeisen Wels	Wels	Raiffeisen Arena	1,700
BSC Raiffeisen Panthers Fürstenfeld	Fürstenfeld	Stadthalle Fürstenfeld	1,200
Arkadia Traiskirchen Lions	Traiskirchen	Lions Dome	1,200
ece Bulls Kapfenberg	Kapfenberg	Sporthalle Walfersam	1,000
Zepter Vienna	Wien	Wiener Stadthalle B	1,000
Chin Min Dragons	St. Pölten	Landessportzentrum St. Pölten	1,000
Xion Dukes Klosterneuburg	Klosterneuburg	Happyland Klosterneuburg	1,000
UBC magnofit Güssing Knights	Güssing	Aktiv Park Güssing	800
UBSC Raiffeisen Graz	Graz	Unionhalle	600

== Standings ==
=== Overall standings ===
Pos	Team	Pld	W	L	PF	PA	PD	Qualification or relegation
1	ece Bulls Kapfenberg	30	22	8	2483	2198	+285	Playoffs
2	UBC magnofit Güssing Knights	30	21	9	2447	2309	+138	Playoffs
3	Zepter Vienna	30	20	10	2447	2309	+138	Playoffs
4	Allianz Swans Gmunden	30	19	11	2492	2300	+192	Playoffs
5	WBC Raiffeisen Wels	30	15	15	2310	2312	−2	Playoffs
6	Xion Dukes Klosterneuburg	30	15	15	2341	2329	+12	Playoffs
7	Redwell Gunners Oberwart	28	18	10	2386	2230	+156	Playoffs
8	BSC Raiffeisen Panthers Fürstenfeld	28	13	15	2394	2389	+5	Playoffs
9	Arkadia Traiskirchen Lions	28	9	19	2216	2302	−86	–
10	UBSC Raiffeisen Graz	28	12	16	2273	2390	−117	–
11	Chin Min Dragons	28	2	26	2123	2730	−607	–

== Playoffs ==
Quarterfinals
1	ece Bulls Kapfenberg	3
8	BSC Raiffeisen Panthers Fürstenfeld	0
4	Allianz Swans Gmunden	2
5	WBC Raiffeisen Wels	3
2	UBC magnofit Güssing Knights	3
7	Redwell Gunners Oberwart	1
3	Zepter Vienna	3
6	Xion Dukes Klosterneuburg	2

Semifinals
1	ece Bulls Kapfenberg	3
4	WBC Raiffeisen Wels	0
2	UBC magnofit Güssing Knights	3
3	Zepter Vienna	2

Finals
1	ece Bulls Kapfenberg	2
2	UBC magnofit Güssing Knights	3

== Statistical leaders ==
=== Points ===
Rank	Name	Team	PPG
1	(Serbia) Zoran Krstanovic	Oberwart	20.6
2	(United States) Amin Stevens	Fürstenfeld	20.6
3	(Cape Verde) B.J. Monteiro	Oberwart	18.9
4	(United States) Darryl Bryant	Fürstenfeld	18.4
5	(United States) Janou Rubin	Fürstenfeld	17.3

=== Rebounds ===
Rank	Name	Team	RPG
1	(Lithuania) Petras Balocka	Fürstenfeld	9.8
2	(United States) Kelly Beidler	Wels	8.7
3	(United States) Travis Taylor	Güssing	8.2
4	(Serbia) Zoran Krstanovic	Oberwart	7.7
5	(United States) Amin Stevens	Fürstenfeld	7.7

=== Assists ===
Rank	Name	Team	APG
1	(United States) Ian Boylan	Kapfenberg	6.3
2	(United States) Sammy Zeglinski	Oberwart	5.2
3	(United States) Anthony Shavies	Güssing	5.1
4	(United States) Zamal Nixon	Wels	4.9
5	(United States) Jonathan Lee	Gmunden	4.6

== Awards ==
Most Valuable Player

- (United States) Mark Sanchez (ece Bulls Kapfenberg)

Austrian MVP

- (Austria) Martin Kohlmaier (ece Bulls Kapfenberg)

Finals MVP

- (United States) Anthony Shavies (UBC magnofit Güssing Knights)

Coach of the Year

- (Germany) Matthias Zollner (UBC magnofit Güssing Knights)
