= 2012–13 Austrian Basketball Bundesliga =

2012–13 Österreichische Basketball Bundesliga
- League: Österreichische Basketball Bundesliga
- Sport: Basketball

Season
- Top seed: Xion Dukes Klosterneuburg
- Season MVP: (United States) Seamus Boxley (Oberwart Gunners)
- Top scorer: (United States) Darnell Hinson (Oberwart Gunners)

Finals
- Champions: BC Zepter Vienna
- Runners-up: Oberwart Gunners
- Finals MVP: (United States) Shawn Ray (BC Zepter Vienna)

Österreichische Basketball Bundesliga seasons
- ← 2011–12 2013–14 →

The 2012–13 Österreichische Basketball Bundesliga was the 67th season of the Österreichische Basketball Bundesliga. 11 teams participated this season, BC Zepter Vienna was the eventual champion and Oberwart Gunners the runner-up.

== Regular season ==
After two rounds this were the final standings. In the first round all teams faced each other, in the second round the 6 best teams from the first round played each other and the 5 worst teams.

1. Xion Dukes Klosterneuburg
2. BC Zepter Vienna
3. ece Bulls Kapfenberg
4. Oberwart Gunners
5. Allianz Swans Gmunden
6. UBC ökoStadt Güssing Knights
7. WBC Raiffeisen Wels
8. BSC Raiffeisen Panthers Fürstenfeld
9. UBSC Raiffeisen Graz
10. Arkadia Traiskirchen Lions
11. Chin Min Dragons

== Playoffs ==
Quarterfinals
1	Xion Dukes Klosterneuburg	3
8	BSC Raiffeisen Panthers Fürstenfeld	0
4	Oberwart Gunners	3
5	Allianz Swans Gmunden	1
2	BC Zepter Vienna	3
7	WBC Raiffeisen Wels	1
3	ece Bulls Kapfenberg	3
6	UBC ökoStadt Güssing Knights	2

Semifinals
1	Xion Dukes Klosterneuburg	2
4	Oberwart Gunners	3
2	BC Zepter Vienna	3
3	ece Bulls Kapfenberg	2

Finals
4	Oberwart Gunners	2
2	BC Zepter Vienna	3

== Awards ==
Most Valuable Player

- (United States) Seamus Boxley (Oberwart Gunners)

Finals MVP

- (United States) Shawn Ray (basketball) (BC Zepter Vienna)

Austrian MVP

- (Austria) Thomas Klepeisz (UBC ökoStadt Güssing Knights)

Coach of the Year

- (Austria) Werner Sallomon (Xion Dukes Klosterneuburg)

== Statistical leaders ==
=== Points ===
Rank	Name	Team	PPG
1	(United States) Darnell Hinson	Oberwart	20.2
2	(United States) Tyler Tiedeman	Wels	19.7
3	(Montenegro) Radosav Spasojevic	Traiskirchen	19.6
4	(Slovenia) Samo Grum	Fürstenfeld	18.6
5	(United States) Seamus Boxley	Oberwart	18.6

=== Rebounds ===
Rank	Name	Team	RPG
1	(United States) Maurice Pearson	Vienna	8.2
2	(United States) Mark Sanchez	Kapfenberg	8.1
3	(United States) Marcus Heard	Güssing	8.1
4	(United States) DeVaughn Washington	Wels	7.5
5	(United States) Amin Stevens	Güssing	7.3

=== Assists ===
Rank	Name	Team	APG
1	(United States) Ian Boylan	Vienna	5.5
2	(Austria) Thomas Klepeisz	Güssing	4.8
3	(United States) Giovonne Woods	Kapfenberg	4.5
4	(Austria) Moritz Lanegger	Klosterneuburg	4.2
5	(United States) Tyler Tiedeman	Wels	4.1
