= Stjepan Stazić =

Austrian basketball player

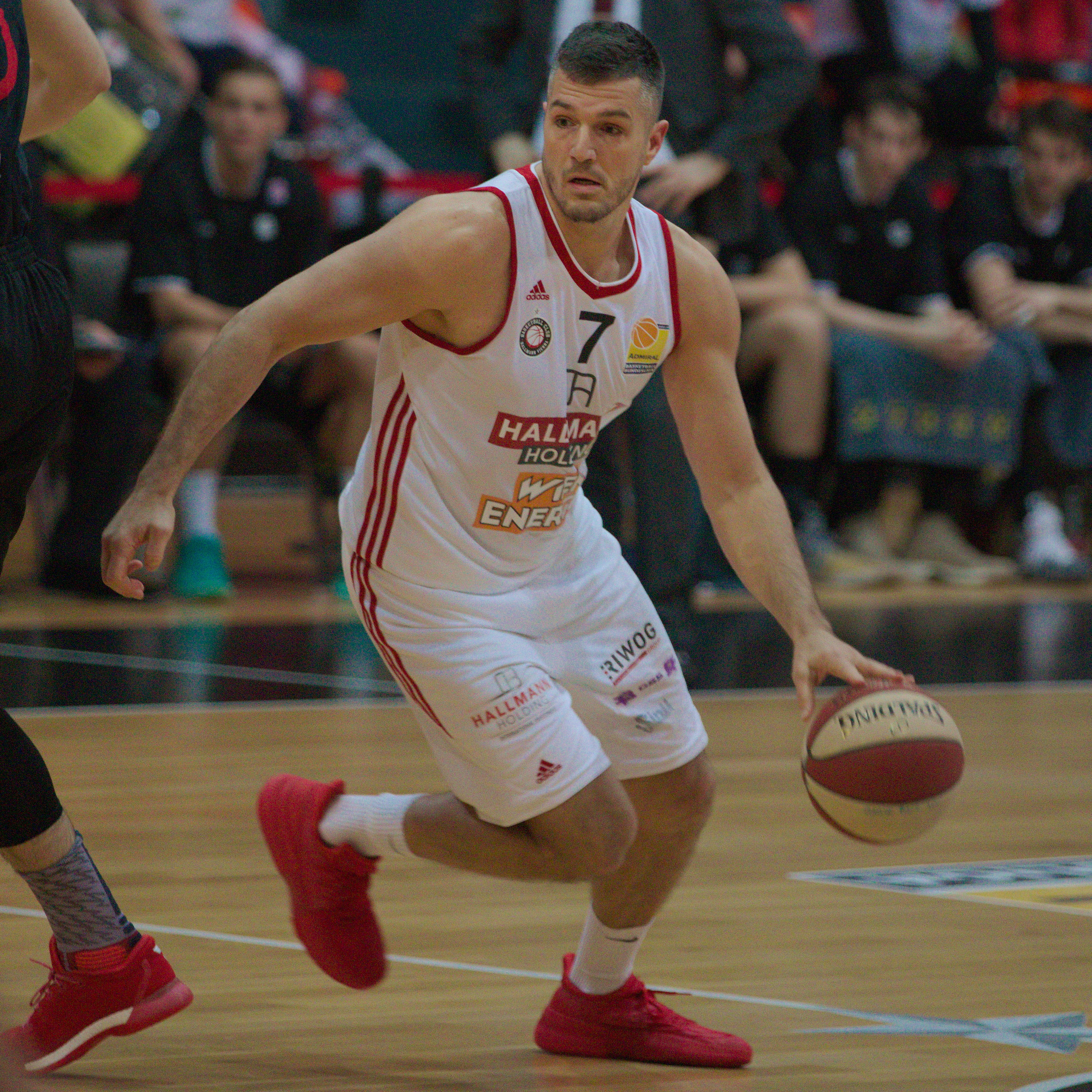
- Stazić playing for BC Vienna, 2018

No. 7 – BC Vienna
- Position: Shooting guard / small forward
- League: Austrian Bundesliga

Personal information
- Born: 28 September 1978 (age 48) Zagreb, Socialist Federal Republic of Yugoslavia
- Listed height: 1.99 m (6 ft 6 in)
- Listed weight: 95 kg (209 lb)

Career information
- Playing career: 1994–present

Career history
- 1994–1995: WAT Wieden
- 1996–1997: St. Pölten
- 1997–1998: Treviso
- 1998–1999: UG Goriziana
- 1999–2000: Limoges
- 2000: Saint Petersburg Lions
- 2001: Viola Reggio Calabria
- 2002: Traiskirchen Lions
- 2003: Olympia Larissa
- 2004: Klosterneuburg
- 2004: Ourense
- 2005: Udine
- 2005–2006: Vienna
- 2006-2007: Traiskirchen Lions
- 2008: Igokea
- 2008–2009: Universitet-Jugra
- 2009-2010: Vienna
- 2010–2011: Panthers Fürstenfeld
- 2011–present: Vienna

Career highlights
- Italian Supercup (1997); FIBA Saporta Cup (1999); Champion of France (2000); Coupe de France (2000); FIBA Korać Cup (2000); 2× Champion of Austria (1997, 2003); ÖBL Most Valuable Player (2018)

Stjepan Stazić (born 28 September 1978) is an Austrian basketball player for BC Vienna. He plays as shooting guard and small forward.

== Honours ==
=== Club ===
- Italian Supercup: 1997
- FIBA Saporta Cup: 1999
- Champions of France: 2000
- Coupe de France: 2000
- FIBA Korać Cup: 2000
- Champions of Austria (2): 1997, 2003

=== Individual awards ===
- ÖBL Most Valuable Player: 2018
