= 2014–15 Austrian Basketball Bundesliga =

ÖBL
- Season: 2014–15; 69th
- Duration: 25 September 2014 – 3 June 2015
- Games played: 28
- Teams: 10

Regular season
- Top seed: Zepter Vienna
- Season MVP: (United States) Travis Taylor

Finals
- Champions: Güssing Knights; 2nd title
- Runners-up: Zepter Vienna
- Finals MVP: (United States) Christopher Dunn

Awards
- Austrian MVP: (Austria) Thomas Klepeisz
- Coach of the Year: (Germany) Matthias Zollner

Statistical leaders
Points	(Croatia) Marko Car	20.4
Rebounds	(United States) Travis Taylor	10.0
Assists	(Austria) Benedikt Danek	7.7
- All statistics correct as of 12 February 2015.

The 2014–15 Österreichische Basketball Bundesliga (Note: Named the Admiral Basketball Bundesliga for sponsorship reasons.) was the 69th season of the Österreichische Basketball Bundesliga. 10 teams participated this season, after St. Pölten left the league.

The season started on September 25, 2014 and ended on June 3, 2015. Güssing Knights repeated as the national champion by beating BC Zepter Vienna 1–3 in the Finals.

== Teams ==
Chin Min Dragons from St. Pölten left the league this season.

Club	Place	Arena	Capacity
Swans Gmunden	Gmunden	Volksbank Arena	2,200
WBC Raiffeisen Wels	Wels	Raiffeisen Arena	1,700
Raiffeisen Panthers Fürstenfeld	Fürstenfeld	Stadthalle Fürstenfeld	1,200
Arkadia Traiskirchen Lions	Traiskirchen	Lions Dome	1,200
ece Bulls Kapfenberg	Kapfenberg	Sporthalle Walfersam	1,000
Zepter Vienna	Wien	Wiener Stadthalle B	1,000
Redwell Gunners Oberwart	Oberwart	Sporthalle Oberwart	2,500
Xion Dukes Klosterneuburg	Klosterneuburg	Happyland Klosterneuburg	1,000
Magnofit Güssing Knights	Güssing	Aktiv Park Güssing	800
Raiffeisen Graz	Graz	Unionhalle	600

== Regular season ==
=== Standings ===
Pos	Team	Pld	W	L	PF	PA	PD	Pts	Qualification
1	Zepter Vienna	36	26	10	3353	3163	+190	52	Qualification to quarter-finals
2	Güssing Knights	36	25	11	3303	2917	+386	50	Qualification to quarter-finals
3	Kapfenberg Bulls	36	22	14	3171	2922	+249	44	Qualification to quarter-finals
4	Swans Gmunden	36	21	15	3314	3151	+163	42	Qualification to quarter-finals
5	Xion Dukes Klosterneuburg	36	20	16	2900	2867	+33	40	Qualification to quarter-finals
6	Raiffeisen Wels	36	19	17	3085	3028	+57	38	Qualification to quarter-finals
7	Oberwart Gunners	36	18	18	3012	2991	+21	36	Qualification to quarter-finals
8	Arkadia Traiskirchen Lions	36	17	19	2985	3110	−125	34	Qualification to quarter-finals
9	Panthers Fürstenfeld	36	10	26	2693	2887	−194	20	
10	Raiffeisen Graz	36	2	34	2496	3276	−780	4	

Source: Eurobasket, ABL

=== Rounds 1-18 ===
Home \ Away	FUR	GMU	GRA	GUS	KAP	KLO	OBE	TRA	VIE	WEL
BSC Raiffeisen Panthers Fürstenfeld		69–111	77–84	69–81	80–86	76–80	79–83	67–84	77–78	64–76
Swans Gmunden	71–70		107–60	90–85	96–83	69–73	79–61	94–62	96–81	81–89
UBSC Raiffeisen Graz	73–79	77–99		46–124	67–91	83–97	63–91	49–78	82–76	67–87
UBC Güssing Knights	99–70	84–76	92–71		60–58	73–67	77–78	74–68	96–84	103–105
Kapfenberg Bulls	96–84	91–85	83–70	71–88		78–62	76–68	91–73	82–84	75–89
Xion Dukes Klosterneuburg	88–71	81–99	89–61	83–69	69–74		63–61	91–69	75–62	64–72
Oberwart Gunners	76–61	67–73	84–73	82–88	65–91	87–66		84–62	75–78	80–73
Arkadia Traiskirchen Lions	75–81	81–99	94–82	93–83	62–50	82–78	82–73		81–93	68–76
BC Zepter Vienna	86–70	103–97	109–72	77–80	87–83	80–70	95–94	85–82		86–84
WBC Raiffeisen Wels	85–73	84–90	71–60	84–64	81–89	72–64	74–64	69–73	67–79	

Legend: Blue = home team win; Red = away team win.

=== Rounds 19-36 ===
Home \ Away	FUR	GMU	GRA	GUS	KAP	KLO	OBE	TRA	VIE	WEL
BSC Raiffeisen Panthers Fürstenfeld		95–87	77–67	77–97	80–75	91–84	80–84	79–72	74–85	91–83
Swans Gmunden	88–86		94–87	84–96	82–90	77–80	79–88	83–87	87–83	73–89
UBSC Raiffeisen Graz	88–93	68–97		52–86	62–74	74–88	68–95	75–83	64–104	84–92
UBC Güssing Knights	79–72	69–73	86–46		77–91	74–63	73–82	88–78	92–72	79–69
Kapfenberg Bulls	83–82	99–65	103–56	75–73		81–66	64–74	83–68	104–76	92–79
Xion Dukes Klosterneuburg	72–66	95–83	91–78	92–97	81–78		75–63	69–81	71–77	73–67
Oberwart Gunners	93–81	79–82	93–72	70–73	71–60	65–67		87–78	93–94	81–90
Arkadia Traiskirchen Lions	78–77	82–92	92–79	83–76	77–72	69–90	78–75		78–66	71–91
BC Zepter Vienna	85–77	93–80	111–76	96–116	89–86	86–79	95–84	85–77		107–64
WBC Raiffeisen Wels	63–69	71–81	89–60	87–95	73–60	78–79	72–79	88–67	81–90	

Legend: Blue = home team win; Red = away team win.

== Playoffs ==
Quarterfinals
1	Zepter Vienna	3
8	Arkadia Traiskirchen Lions	2
4	Swans Gmunden	3
5	Xion Dukes Klosterneuburg	2
2	Güssing Knights	3
7	Oberwart Gunners	0
3	Kapfenberg Bulls	3
6	Raiffeisen Wels	1

Semifinals
1	Zepter Vienna	3
4	Swans Gmunden	0
2	Güssing Knights	3
3	Kapfenberg Bulls	0

Finals
1	Zepter Vienna	1
2	Güssing Knights	3

== Awards ==
- MVP: (United States) Travis Taylor – Güssing Knights
- Finals MVP: (United States) Christopher Dunn – Güssing Knights
- Austrian MVP: (Austria) Thomas Klepeisz – Güssing Knights
- Coach of the Year: (Germany) Matthias Zollner – Güssing Knights

This season, three new awards were announced by the ABL.

- Top scorer: (Croatia) Marko Car – Panthers Fürstenfeld
- Rising Star: (Austria) Daniel Friedrich – Swans Gmunden
- ÖBL Defensive Player of the Year: (Austria) Moritz Lanegger – Xion Dukes Klosterneuburg
