= Austrian Basketball Supercup =

Basketball competition

Austrian Basketball Cup
- Sport: Basketball
- Founded: 2002
- Country: Austria
- Continent: Europe
- Most recent champions: Kapfenberg Bulls (5th title)
- Most titles: Swans Gmunden (7 titles)
- Related competitions: Admiral Basketball League; Austrian Basketball Cup

The Austrian Basketball Supercup German: Basketball Supercup Österreich is a yearly held basketball game that is a super cup competition. It is played by the Austrian champion and the Austrian Cup winner. The game was introduced in 2002, and the first two editions were won by Kapfenberg Bulls.

== Editions ==
Key
Supercup champion

Year	Austrian Champion	Score	Austrian Cup Winner	Location	MVP
2002	Kapfenberg Bulls	87–71	Mattersburg 49ers	Vienna	—N/a
2003	Kapfenberg Bulls	81–74	Allianz Swans Gmunden	Vösendorf	(United States) Rasheed Brokenborough
2004	Kapfenberg Bulls	50–85	Allianz Swans Gmunden	Wels	—N/a
2005	Allianz Swans Gmunden	92–64	Oberwart Gunners	Vienna	(Austria) De'Teri Mayes
2006	Allianz Swans Gmunden	80–69	WBC Wels	Wels	—N/a
2007	Allianz Swans Gmunden	82–71	Kapfenberg Bulls	Wels	—N/a
2008	Panthers Fürstenfeld (Note: Runner-up in the last Bundesliga season.)	74–79	Allianz Swans Gmunden	Gmunden	—N/a
2009	WBC Raiffeisen Wels (Note: Qualified as the last Bundesliga champion.)	68–77	Panthers Fürstenfeld	Fürstenfeld	—N/a
2010	Allianz Swans Gmunden	69–60	Panthers Fürstenfeld	Fürstenfeld	—N/a
2011	Allianz Swans Gmunden	82–61	Panthers Fürstenfeld	Oberwart	(United States) Sharaud Curry
2012	Xion Dukes Klosterneuburg	91–82	Allianz Swans Gmunden	Klosterneuburg	(United States) Jason Chappell
2013	BC Zepter Vienna	76–78	Xion Dukes Klosterneuburg	Vienna	(United States) Curtis Bobb
2014	UBC magnofit Güssing Knights	76–77	ece Bulls Kapfenberg	Güssing	(United States) Ian Boylan
2015	Hallmann Vienna	77–65	Güssing Knights	Güssing	(United States) Jonathan Fairell
2016	Oberwart Gunners	68–71	WBC Wels	Oberwart	(United States) Kevin Payton
2017	Kapfenberg Bulls	91–72	Oberwart Gunners	Kapfenberg	(Austria) Filip Krämer
2018	Kapfenberg Bulls	81–68	Swans Gmunden	Kapfenberg	(United States) Elijah Wilson
2021	Swans Gmunden	82–61	Oberwart Gunners		

== Performances by club ==
Teams in italic are nog longer existing.

Club	Winners	Runner-up
Swans Gmunden	8	2
Kapfenberg Bulls	5	2
Xion Dukes Klosterneuburg	2	0
Panthers Fürstenfeld	1	3
Güssing Knights	1	1
Zepter Vienna	1	1
WBC Wels	1	1
Mattersburg 49ers	0	1
Oberwart Gunners	0	3
