= ULEB Cup 2007–08 Regular Season Group E =

These are the Group E standings and results.

Key to colors
Top three places in each group, plus five highest-ranked four-places teams, advance to Top 32
Eliminated

== Standings ==
	Team	Pld	W	L	PF	PA	Diff
1.	(Russia) Triumph Lyubertsy	10	8	2	792	686	106
2.	(Montenegro) Budućnost Podgorica	10	7	3	781	709	72
3.	(Austria) Allianz Swans Gmunden	10	5	5	748	763	-15
4.	(Belgium) Antwerp Giants	10	4	6	754	791	-37
5.	(Israel) Hapoel Galil Elyon	10	3	7	784	839	-55
6.	(Switzerland) Benetton Fribourg	10	3	7	737	808	-71

== Results/Fixtures ==
All times given below are in Central European Time.

=== Game 1 ===
November 6, 2007

November 6
18:15

Hapoel Galil Elyon (Israel)	74–79	(Austria) Allianz Swans
Scoring by quarter: 23-27, 18-19, 20-16, 13-17

Kfar Blum

November 6
19:00

Benetton Fribourg (Switzerland)	106–102 (OT) (OT)	(Belgium) Antwerp Giants
Scoring by quarter: 21-26, 24-15, 22-18, 14-22, Overtime: 9-9, 16-14

Fribourg

November 6
20:30

Budućnost (Montenegro)	66–75	(Russia) Triumph Lyubertsy
Scoring by quarter: 21-19, 14-22, 16-22, 15-12

Podgorica

=== Game 2 ===
November 13, 2007

November 13
17:00

Triumph Lyubertsy (Russia)	84–68	(Israel) Hapoel Galil Elyon
Scoring by quarter: 16-18, 25-12, 19-23, 24-15

Lyubertsy

November 13
19:30

Allianz Swans (Austria)	85–71	(Switzerland) Benetton Fribourg
Scoring by quarter: 24-20, 16-17, 27-17, 18-17

Gmunden

November 13
20:30

Antwerp Giants (Belgium)	76–79	(Montenegro) Budućnost
Scoring by quarter: 14-22, 19-14, 13-22, 30-21

Antwerp

=== Game 3 ===
November 20, 2007

November 20
18:15

Hapoel Galil Elyon (Israel)	93–83	(Belgium) Antwerp Giants
Scoring by quarter: 20-16, 21-18, 31-21, 21-28

Kfar Blum

November 20
19:30

Benetton Fribourg (Switzerland)	73–82	(Montenegro) Budućnost
Scoring by quarter: 22-21, 16-33, 20-15, 15-13

Fribourg

November 20
19:30

Allianz Swans (Austria)	53–83	(Russia) Triumph Lyubertsy
Scoring by quarter: 19-20, 13-28, 15-25, 6-10

Gmunden

=== Game 4 ===
November 27, 2007

November 27
19:30

Benetton Fribourg (Switzerland)	78–77	(Russia) Triumph Lyubertsy
Scoring by quarter: 22-22, 12-26, 26-16, 18-13

Fribourg

November 27
20:30

Budućnost (Montenegro)	93–68	(Israel) Hapoel Galil Elyon
Scoring by quarter: 34-11, 12-23, 18-20, 29-14

Podgorica

November 27
20:30

'Antwerp Giants (Belgium)	74–68	(Austria) Allianz Swans
Scoring by quarter: 23-13, 20-20, 15-18, 16-17

Antwerp

=== Game 5 ===
December 4, 2007

December 4
17:00

Triumph Lyubertsy (Russia)	88–67	(Belgium) Antwerp Giants
Scoring by quarter: 30-12, 25-22, 20-22, 13-11

Lyubertsy

December 4
18:15

Hapoel Galil Elyon (Israel)	65–85	(Switzerland) Benetton Fribourg
Scoring by quarter: 19-15, 14-27, 9-16, 23-27

Kfar Blum

December 4
19:30

Allianz Swans (Austria)	72–79	(Montenegro) Budućnost
Scoring by quarter: 20-19, 13-18, 20-14, 19-28

Gmunden

=== Game 6 ===
December 11, 2007

December 11
17:00

Triumph Lyubertsy (Russia)	75–65	(Montenegro) Budućnost
Scoring by quarter: 18-19, 18-19, 16-15, 23-12

Lyubertsy

December 11
19:30

Allianz Swans (Austria)	90–83	(Israel) Hapoel Galil Elyon
Scoring by quarter: 22-28, 24-21, 26-19, 18-15

Gmunden

December 11
20:30

Antwerp Giants (Belgium)	58–50	(Switzerland) Benetton Fribourg
Scoring by quarter: 14-14, 10-19, 18-8, 16-9

Antwerp

=== Game 7 ===
December 18, 2007

December 18
18:15

Hapoel Galil Elyon (Israel)	73–82	(Russia) Triumph Lyubertsy
Scoring by quarter: 23-17, 19-25, 12-17, 19-23

Kfar Blum

December 18
19:30

Benetton Fribourg (Switzerland)	66–88	(Austria) Allianz Swans
Scoring by quarter: 20-23, 9-23, 17-29, 20-13

Fribourg

December 18
20:30

Budućnost (Montenegro)	76–65	(Belgium) Antwerp Giants
Scoring by quarter: 19-15, 18-21, 22-17, 17-12

Podgorica

=== Game 8 ===
January 8, 2008

January 8
17:00

Triumph Lyubertsy (Russia)	78–73	(Austria) Allianz Swans
Scoring by quarter: 22-21, 19-20, 18-17, 19-15

Lyubertsy

January 8
20:30

Antwerp Giants (Belgium)	78–77	(Israel) Hapoel Galil Elyon
Scoring by quarter: 14-18, 20-14, 21-27, 23-18

Antwerp

January 8
20:30

Budućnost (Montenegro)	74–63	(Switzerland) Benetton Fribourg
Scoring by quarter: 15-15, 14-13, 26-15, 19-20

Podgorica

=== Game 9 ===
January 15, 2008

January 15
17:00

Triumph Lyubertsy (Russia)	76–61	(Switzerland) Benetton Fribourg
Scoring by quarter: 28-20, 15-8, 16-21, 17-12

Lyubertsy

January 15
18:15

Hapoel Galil Elyon (Israel)	82–81	(Montenegro) Budućnost
Scoring by quarter: 27-22, 17-18, 17-20, 21-21

Kfar Blum

January 15
19:30

Allianz Swans (Austria)	80–69	(Belgium) Antwerp Giants
Scoring by quarter: 22-14, 19-12, 14-19, 25-24

Podgorica

=== Game 10 ===
January 22, 2008

January 22
20:00

Antwerp Giants (Belgium)	82–74	(Russia) Triumph Lyubertsy
Scoring by quarter: 20-20, 22-16, 17-25, 23-11

Antwerp

January 22
20:00

Benetton Fribourg (Switzerland)	84–101	(Israel) Hapoel Galil Elyon
Scoring by quarter: 26-29, 16-18, 24-20, 18-34

Fribourg

January 22
20:00

Budućnost (Montenegro)	86–60	(Austria) Allianz Swans
Scoring by quarter: 18-20, 28-18, 20-10, 20-12

Podgorica
