= 2014–15 EuroChallenge Group J =

Basketball tournament group stage

Group J of the 2014–15 EuroChallenge was the second group of the Last 16 phase. It consisted of JSF Nanterre, Güssing Knights, Le Mans Sarthe Basket, and Uşak Sportif. Play began on 13 January 2015 and ended 24 February.

== Standings ==
Pos	Team	Pld	W	L	PF	PA	PD	Pts	Qualification	NAN	MSB	GÜS	USA
1	(France) JSF Nanterre	6	4	2	487	434	+53	10	Advance to quarterfinals	—	85–68	89–86	100–67
2	(France) Le Mans	6	4	2	464	429	+35	10	Advance to quarterfinals	72–60	—	93–60	84–63
3	(Austria) magnofit Güssing Knights	6	2	4	458	471	−13	8		62–82	82–65	—	91–63
4	(Turkey) Uşak Sportif	6	2	4	430	505	−75	8		79–71	79–82	79–77	—

Source: EuroChallenge
