= Quincy Diggs =

American-Austrian basketball player (born 1990)

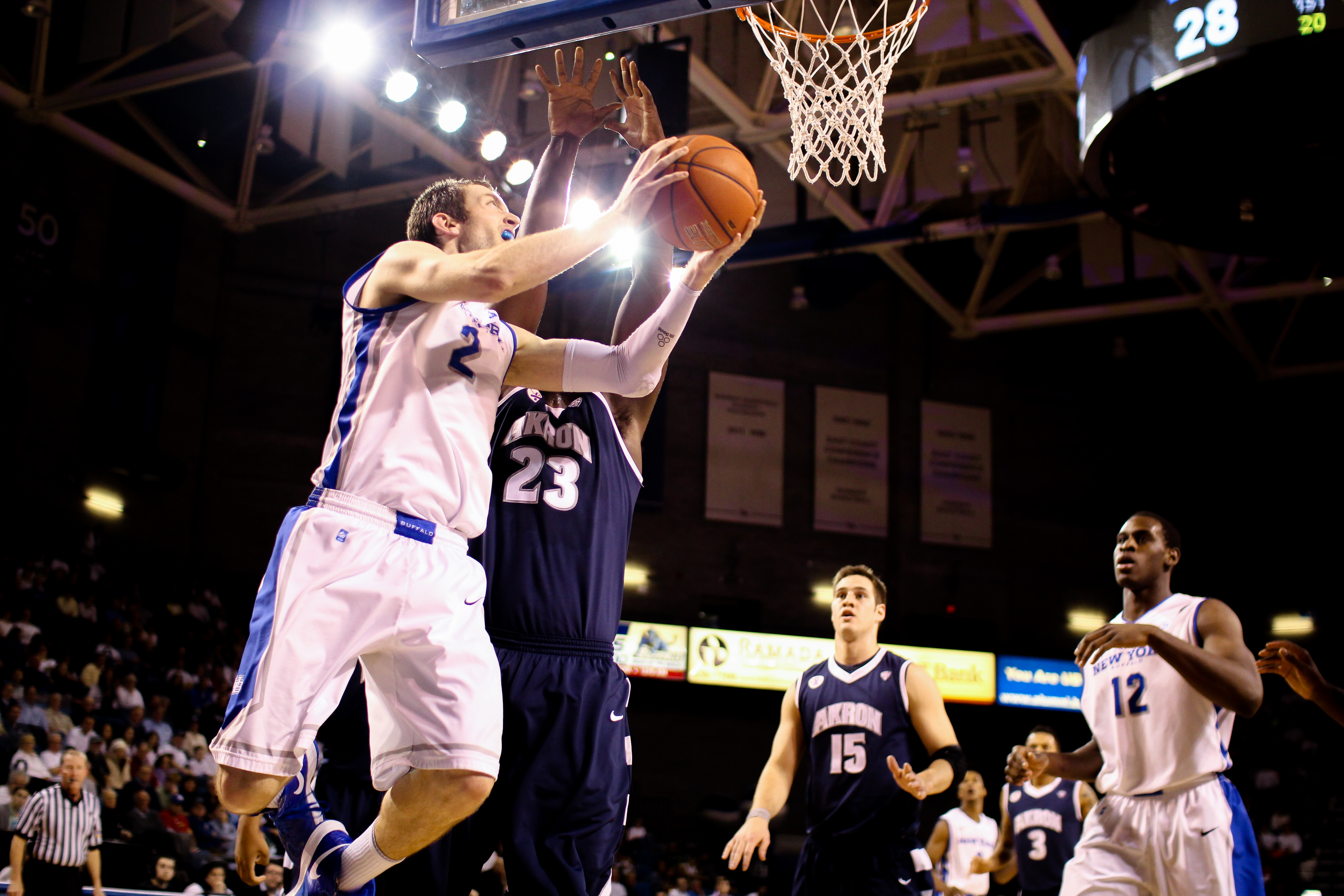
- Diggs (23) playing against Buffalo

No. 13 – Oberwart Gunners
- Position: Small forward
- League: Austrian Basketball Bundesliga

Personal information
- Born: April 8, 1990 (age 36) Wichita, Kansas, U.S
- Listed height: 6 ft 6 in (1.98 m)
- Listed weight: 209 lb (95 kg)

Career information
- High school: Plano East (Plano, Texas)
- College: New Orleans (2009–2010); Akron (2010–2014)
- NBA draft: 2014: undrafted
- Playing career: 2015–present

Career history
- 2015–2016: Oberwart Gunners
- 2016–2017: Eisbaeren Bremerhaven
- 2017: CEZ Nymburk
- 2017–2018: Boulazac
- 2018–2019: Kolossos Rodou
- 2019: Okapi Aalstar
- 2019–2020: PVSK Panthers
- 2020–2021: Oberwart Gunners
- 2021: Fribourg Olympic
- 2021–2022: Soproni KC
- 2022: Kaposvári KK
- 2024–present: Oberwart Gunners

Career highlights
- Austrian League MVP (2016); Austrian League champion (2016); Second-team All-MAC (2014); MAC Sixth Man of the Year (2012)

Quincy Johan Diggs (born December 8, 1990) is an American-Austrian professional basketball player for Oberwart Gunners of the Austrian Basketball Bundesliga.

== College career ==
In the 2011–11 season, the Akron Zips qualified for the NCAA Tournament, where they lost to Notre Dame with Diggs scoring 11 points in the matchup. The following season Akron lost in the MAC tournament final to Ohio when Diggs's missed a desperation last second shot. The Zips participate in the National Invitation Tournament in 2012, however, they lost in the first round to Northwestern despite 18 points from Diggs. Diggs averaged 8.5 points, 3.1 rebounds and 2.4 assists per game as a junior and was MAC Sixth Man of the Year in 2012, but was suspended from the university for the next season, in what was later revealed to be fights with his girlfriend. After a year break Diggs returned to the team, which lost in the semifinals of the MAC championship after overtime against the eventual winner Western Michigan. This time Akron participated in the Collegeinsider.com Tournament (CIT), in which they lost 97–91 to IPFW in the first round despite 23 points from Diggs, which brought Diggs's career in college to an end. As a senior, Diggs posted 12.8 points, 4.6 rebounds and 2.6 assists and was named Second Team All-Mid-American Conference.

SEASON AVERAGES
SEASON	TEAM	MIN	FGM-FGA	FG%	3PM-3PA	3P%	FTM-FTA	FT%	REB	AST	BLK	STL	PF	TO	PTS
2013–14	AKR	29.5	4.3–10.2	.422	1.5–4.5	.342	2.7–4.1	.655	4.6	2.6	0.1	1.7	1.6	2.7	12.8
2011–12	AKR	25.5	2.8–6.3	.446	0.9–2.4	.378	2.0–2.9	.687	3.1	2.4	0.1	1.2	1.9	2.4	8.5
2010–11	AKR	16.6	1.9–4.0	.469	0.4–1.1	.390	1.1–1.5	.722	2.8	1.2	0.1	0.8	1.7	1.4	5.3
2009–10	UNO	13.3	1.1–2.9	.380	0.5–1.5	.317	0.6–0.9	.739	1.6	0.3	0.0	0.5	1.1	0.8	3.3

== Professional career ==
Diggs signed with Oberwart Gunners in 2015 and averaged 20.0 points, 7.3 rebounds and 3.2 assists per game. He was named MVP of the Austrian league. In the 2016–2017 season, Diggs competed for Eisbaeren Bremerhaven. He averaged 13.3 points, 4.8 rebounds and 3.6 assists per game. In June 2017 he signed with the Czech team CEZ Nymburk. Diggs averaged 9.9 points and 5.5 rebounds per game with Nymburk. In November 2017, he inked with Boulazac. On July 24, 2018, Diggs moved to Greece for Kolossos Rodou. He was released from the Greek team on April 5, 2019.

On April 19, 2019, Diggs signed with Okapi Aalstar of the Belgium Pro Basketball League. He later joined PVSK Panthers of the Hungarian league and averaged 13.1 points, 3.7 rebounds, 2.6 assists and 1.6 steals per game. On September 9, 2020, Diggs returned to Oberwart Gunners. He averaged 14 points, 5.4 rebounds, 4.1 assists and 1.8 steals per game. On August 10, 2021, Diggs signed with Fribourg Olympic Basket of the Swiss Basketball League.

On January 2, 2022, Diggs signed with Kaposvári KK of the Nemzeti Bajnokság I/A.

On December 20, 2024, Diggs returned to Oberwart Gunners.

== National team career ==
On October 26, 2023, Diggs received the Austrian citizenship. He gave his debut for Austria men's national basketball team on Februar 22, 2024.
