= Chris McNealy =

Chris McNealy may refer to:

- Chris McNealy (basketball, born 1961), American former National Basketball Association player
- Chris McNealy (basketball, born 1992), American basketball player, son of the above
