= Matthias Zollner =

German professional basketball coach (born 1981)

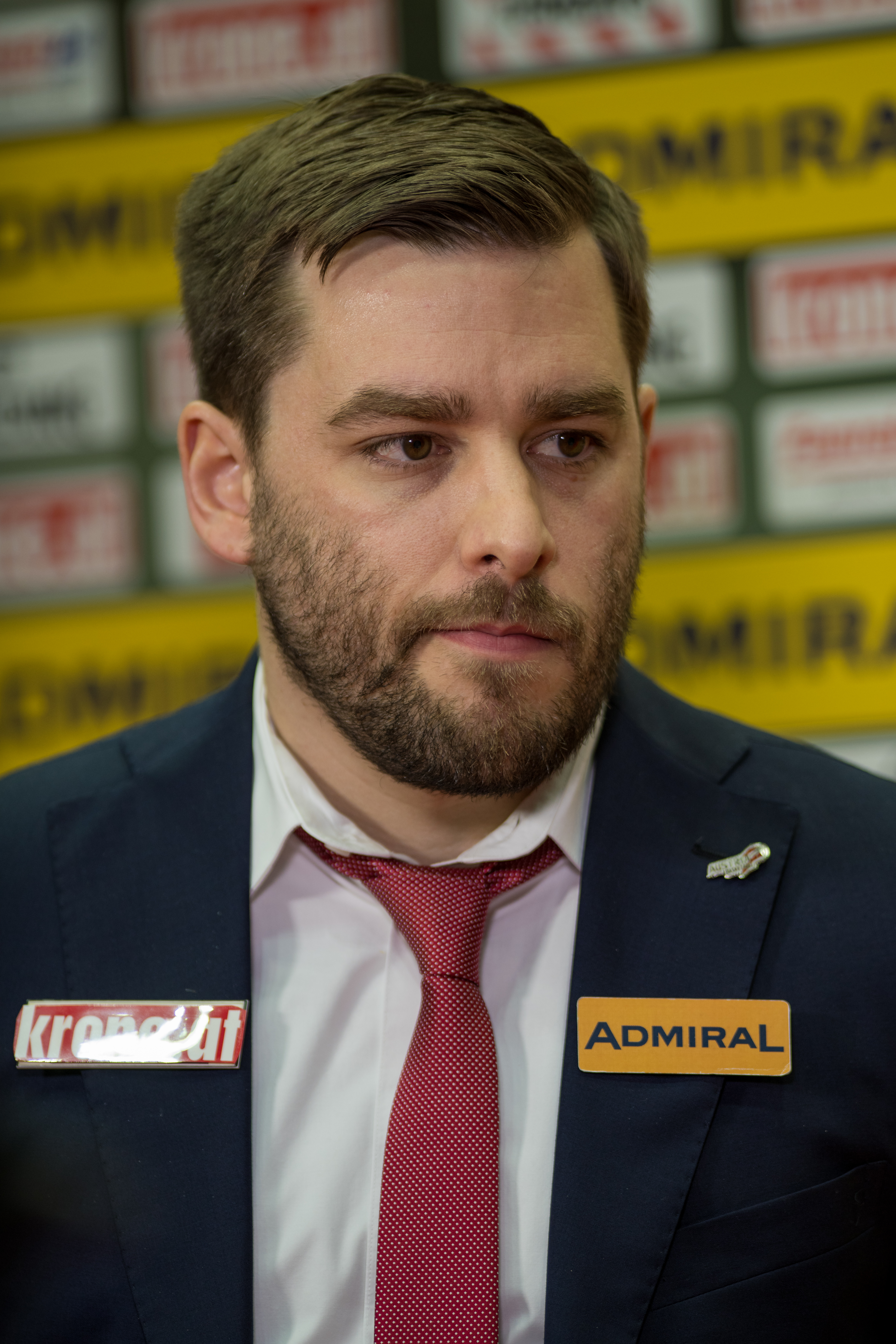
- Zollner as the Austrian national team coach in 2017

Personal information
- Born: 9 May 1981 (age 45)
- Position: Head coach
- Coaching career: 2004–present

Career history

Coaching
- 2004–2009: TSV Dachau Spurs
- 2009–2012: Munich Basket
- 2013: Germany (assistant)
- 2013–2016: Güssing Knights
- 2017–2018: Austria
- 2018: Prishtina
- 2018–2020: Egis Körmend
- 2020–2021: GTK Gliwice
- 2021–2023: Alba Fehérvár

Career highlights
- Austrian League champion (2014–2015); Austrian Cup champion (2015); ÖBL Coach of the Year (2014–2015)

Matthias Zollner (born 9 May 1981) is a German professional basketball coach who most recently served as head coach of Alba Fehérvár.

== Coaching career ==
From 2004 to 2009 Zollner coached his hometown club TSV Dachau 1865 "Spurs". In 2009 he took over Munich's most traditional basketball club Munich Basket formerly known as Lotus Munich. Coach Zollner guided Basket's team for 3 seasons before being nominated as an assistant coach for the German national basketball team.

In 2013, Zollner was an assistant coach on the German national basketball team.

In the 2013–14 season, Zollner led the UBC Güssing Knights to its first Austrian title, despite being ranked by experts to be 7th before the start of the season. Individually, he won the ÖBL Coach of the Year award.

During the 2014-15 season, Zollner led the UBC Güssing Knights in their maiden Eurochallenge campaign to a sensational top 16 participation. The first for an Austrian team ever. In March 2015 Zollner and his UBC Güssing Knights captured the Austrian Cup title for the first time in club history.

Also Coach Zollner won the ÖBL Coach of the Year for the second consecutive year. He became the first coach ever to win the award back to back. In February 2016, Zollner left the club because of its financial problems.

On 18 August 2018, he signed a contract with Z-Mobile Prishtina of the Kosovo Basketball Superleague. Less than two months later he was let go by the team.

On 26 May 2020, Zollner signed with GTK Gliwice in Poland and parted company with the team after the conclusion of the 2020-21 season. He was appointed the new head coach of Hungarian side Alba Fehérvár on November 19, 2021. Zollner was sacked in February 2023.
