= 2014–15 EuroChallenge Group F =

Basketball tournament group stage

Group F of the 2014–15 EuroChallenge consisted of U-BT Cluj-Napoca, Trabzonspor, UBC Güssing Knights and Atomerőmű SE. The play began on 4 November and ended on 16 December 2014.

== Teams ==
| Draw seed | Team | City | Country | Last appearance | 2013–14 | | | Arena | Capacity |
| Draw seed | Team | City | Country | Last appearance | League | Pos. | Playoffs | Arena | Capacity |
|---|---|---|---|---|---|---|---|---|---|
| I | Atomerőmű SE | Paks | Hungary | 2013–14 | Korisliiga | 2nd | RU | ASE Sportcsarnok | 2,000 |
| II | U-BT Cluj-Napoca | Cluj-Napoca | Romania | 2011–12 | Liga națională | 5th | SF | Sala Polivalentă | 7,308 |
| III | Trabzonspor Medical Park | Trabzon | Turkey | — | TBL | 9th | — | Hayri Gür Arena | 7,500 |
| IV | UBC Güssing Knights | Güssing | Austria | — | ABL | 2nd | C | Aktiv Park Güssing | 1,000 |

== Standings ==
| Pos | Team | Pld | W | L | PF | PA | PD | Pts | TS | GÜS | UBT | ATO |
|---|---|---|---|---|---|---|---|---|---|---|---|---|
| 1 | (Turkey) Trabzonspor Medical Park (Q) | 6 | 6 | 0 | 514 | 450 | +64 | 12 | | 80–72 | 91–72 | 103–81 |
| 2 | (Austria) Güssing Knights (Q) | 6 | 4 | 2 | 477 | 456 | +21 | 10 | 67–77 | | 84–77 | 93–84 |
| 3 | (Romania) U-BT Cluj-Napoca | 6 | 1 | 5 | 442 | 478 | −36 | 7 | 80–81 | 68–81 | | 64–73 |
| 4 | (Hungary) Atomerőmű SE | 6 | 1 | 5 | 454 | 503 | −49 | 7 | 78–82 | 70–80 | 68–81 | |

(Q) Qualify for Top 16
