= Predrag Miletić (basketball) =

Serbian basketball player

No. 8 – Klosterneuburg Dukes
- Position: Shooting guard
- League: Österreichische Bundesliga

Personal information
- Born: August 17, 1984 (age 42) Kraljevo, SFR Yugoslavia
- Listed height: 1.90 m (6 ft 3 in)

Career information
- NBA draft: 2006: undrafted
- Playing career: 2006–present

Career history
- 2006–2008: Napredak Kruševac
- 2008–2010: Gryfony
- 2010–2011: Radnički Kragujevac
- 2011–2012: Khimik
- 2013: CSU Asesoft
- 2013–2017: Zepter Vienna
- 2017–present: Klosterneuburg Dukes

Career highlights
- ÖBL Most Valuable Player (2017)

Predrag Miletić (born August 17, 1984) is a Serbian professional basketball player who currently plays for Klosterneuburg Dukes of the Österreichische Basketball Bundesliga.

== Professional career ==
In the 2016–17 season, Miletić was named the Most Valuable Player of the Austrian ABL, after averaging 19.1 points per game.
