= Sharaud Curry =

American basketball player (born 1987)

Free agent
- Position: Point guard

Personal information
- Born: May 16, 1987 (age 39) Gainesville, Georgia, U.S.
- Listed height: 5 ft 10 in (1.78 m)
- Listed weight: 169 lb (77 kg)

Career information
- High school: Joseph Wheeler (Marietta, Georgia)
- College: Providence (2005–2010)
- NBA draft: 2010: undrafted
- Playing career: 2010–present

Career history
- 2010: AZS Koszalin
- 2011: AEK Athens
- 2011–2012: Allianz Swans Gmunden
- 2012–2013: Mitteldeutscher
- 2013: Gießen 46ers
- 2013–2014: KTP
- 2014–2015: Lukoil Academic
- 2015–2016: Reims Champagne
- 2016: BC Kalev
- 2017–2018: TED Ankara Kolejliler
- 2018–2019: Poitiers Basket 86
- 2019–2020: Naturtex-SZTE-Szedeák
- 2020–2021: Kaposvári KK
- 2022: MZT Skopje
- 2023: Ostioneros de Guaymas

Career highlights
- Austrian League MVP (2012); Finnish League assists leader (2014)

Morris Sharaud Curry (born May 16, 1987) is an American professional basketball point guard who last played for MZT Skopje of the Macedonian League. Curry graduated from Joseph Wheeler High School in Georgia, where his team won basketball state championships in 2003 and 2005. He attended Providence College from 2005 to 2010. As a freshman at Providence, Curry was named to the Big East all-rookie team.

Curry joined MZT Skopje on January 27, 2022.

== Honors ==
Joseph Wheeler High School – 2003–2005

- Georgia High School Association – State Championship (5A) – 2003
- Georgia High School Association – State Championship (5A) – 2005
- Joseph Wheeler High School – 3rd All-Time Points Scored

Providence College – 2005–2010

- Big East Conference – All-Rookie Team
- Bob Cousy Award – Finalist
- Providence Friars men's basketball – Male Athlete of the Year
- Providence Friars men's basketball – All-Time Best FT %
- Providence Friars men's basketball – 10th All-Time Points Scored

Allianz Swans Gmunden – 2011–2012

- ÖBL Most Valuable Player
- Austrian Cup
- Austrian Supercup
- EuroCup Basketball Awards – Guard of the year
- EuroCup Basketball Awards – 1st Team All-League
- EuroCup Basketball Awards – 1st Team All-Imports
- EuroCup Basketball Awards – Import of the Year

KTP-Basket – 2013–2014

- EuroCup Basketball MVP
- EuroCup Basketball Awards – Guard of the year
- EuroCup Basketball Awards – 1st Team All-League
- EuroCup Basketball Awards – 1st Team All-Imports
