= 2020–21 Austrian Basketball Superliga =

Austrian Basketball Superliga
- Season: 2020–21
- Teams: 10
- TV partners: Sky Sport; ORF+

Regular season
- Season MVP: (Austria) Enis Murati

Finals
- Champions: Swans Gmunden; 1st Superliga title 5th Austrian title
- Runners-up: Kapfenberg Bulls

The 2020–21 Austrian Basketball Superliga was the second season of the Basketball Superliga, the top-tier league in Austrian basketball. It is the 75th season of the first tier of basketball in Austria.

Swans Gmunden won the first Superliga championship, its fifth Austrian title.

== Format ==
Teams first play each other in the regular season home and away. After this, teams ranked 1–6 and 7-10 are divided in two groups to qualify for the playoffs. In the playoffs, the best eight teams play each other for the national championship in best-of-five series. The two lowest placed teams play against the top two teams of the Basketball Zweite Liga (B2L).

== Teams ==
=== Venues and locations ===
Location of teams in 2020–21 ABS

Club	Place	Arena	Capacity
Flyers Wels	Wels	Raiffeisen Arena	1,700
GGMT Vienna	Wien	Wiener Stadthalle B	1,000
Klosterneuburg Dukes	Klosterneuburg	Happyland Klosterneuburg	1,000
Kapfenberg Bulls	Kapfenberg	Sporthalle Walfersam	1,000
Oberwart Gunners	Oberwart	Sporthalle Oberwart	2,500
UBSC Graz	Graz	Unionhalle	600
SKN St. Pölten	Sankt Pölten	Landessportzentrum St. Pölten	1,000
Swans Gmunden	Gmunden	Volksbank Arena	2,200
Traiskirchen Lions	Traiskirchen	Lions Dome	1,200
Vienna DC Timberwolves	Wien	T-Mobile Dome	1,000

== Regular season ==
=== Basic Round ===
Pos	Team	Pld	W	L	PF	PA	PD	Pts	Qualification
1	Kapfenberg Bulls	18	13	5	1409	1257	+152	26	Qualification to group 1–6
2	Swans Gmunden	18	12	6	1500	1363	+137	24	Qualification to group 1–6
3	Klosterneuburg Dukes	18	11	7	1498	1405	+93	22	Qualification to group 1–6
4	Flyers Wels	18	10	8	1540	1518	+22	20	Qualification to group 1–6
5	SKN St. Pölten	18	10	8	1409	1437	−28	20	Qualification to group 1–6
6	Oberwart Gunners	18	10	8	1409	1356	+53	20	Qualification to group 1–6
7	GGMT Vienna	18	9	9	1524	1467	+57	18	Qualification to group 7–10
8	UBSC Graz	18	9	9	1582	1557	+25	18	Qualification to group 7–10
9	Traiskirchen Lions	18	3	15	1400	1575	−175	6	Qualification to group 7–10
10	Vienna DC Timberwolves	18	3	15	1259	1595	−336	6	Qualification to group 7–10

Source: Basketball Austria

=== Placement Round ===
Pos	Team	Pld	W	L	PF	PA	PD	Pts	Qualification
1	Swans Gmunden	28	21	7	2374	2175	+199	42	Qualification to playoffs
2	Kapfenberg Bulls	28	19	9	2199	2019	+180	38	Qualification to playoffs
3	Klosterneuburg Dukes	28	16	12	2273	2177	+96	32	Qualification to playoffs
4	Oberwart Gunners	28	14	14	2229	2186	+43	28	Qualification to playoffs
5	SKN St. Pölten	28	13	15	2153	2212	−59	26	Qualification to playoffs
6	Flyers Wels	28	13	15	2312	2342	−30	26	Qualification to playoffs

Source: Basketball Austria

=== Qualifying round ===
Pos	Team	Pld	W	L	PF	PA	PD	Pts	Qualification
1	GGMT Vienna	23	14	9	2049	1851	+198	28	Qualification to playoffs
2	UBSC Graz	24	13	11	2108	2063	+45	26	Qualification to playoffs
3	Vienna DC Timberwolves	24	4	20	1714	2137	−423	8	
4	Traiskirchen Lions	24	4	20	1815	2064	−249	8	

Source: Basketball Austria

== Play-offs ==
=== Bracket ===
Quarterfinals
1 Swans Gmunden	3
8 UBSC Graz	1
4 Oberwart Gunners	3
5 SKN St. Pölten	1
2 Kapfenberg Bulls	3
7 GGMT Vienna	2
3 Klosterneuburg Dukes	1
6 Flyers Wels	3

Semifinals
1 Swans Gmunden	3
4 Oberwart Gunners	1
2 Kapfenberg Bulls	3
6 Flyers Wels	0

Finals
1 Swans Gmunden	3
2 Kapfenberg Bulls	1

=== Quarterfinals ===
The team with the higher seed played game one and three (if necessary) at home.

Team 1	Series	Team 2	Game 1	Game 2	Game 3	Game 4	Game 5
Swans Gmunden	3–1	UBSC Graz	89–81	94–82	63–77	96–83	
Oberwart Gunners	3–1	SKN St. Pölten	107–84	86–82	87–90	72–59	
Kapfenberg Bulls	3–2	GGMT Vienna	80–74	80–82	65–64	73–84	97–67
Klosterneuburg Dukes	1–3	Flyers Wels	82–95	75–88	85–73	65–92	

=== Semifinals ===
The team with the higher seed played game one, two and 5 (if necessary) at home.

Team 1	Series	Team 2	Game 1	Game 2	Game 3	Game 4	Game 5
Swans Gmunden	3–1	Oberwart Gunners	104–79	86–80	90–84	97–94	
Kapfenberg Bulls	3–0	Flyers Wels	85–73	83–74	82–58		

=== Finals ===
The team with the higher seed played game one, two and five (if necessary) at home.

Team 1	Series	Team 2	Game 1	Game 2	Game 3	Game 4	Game 5
Swans Gmunden	3–1	Kapfenberg Bulls	80–86	83–65	109–98	90–83	

== Austrian clubs in European competitions ==
Team	Competition	Progress
Kapfenberg Bulls	FIBA Europe Cup	Regular season
