= Travis Taylor (basketball) =

American basketball player

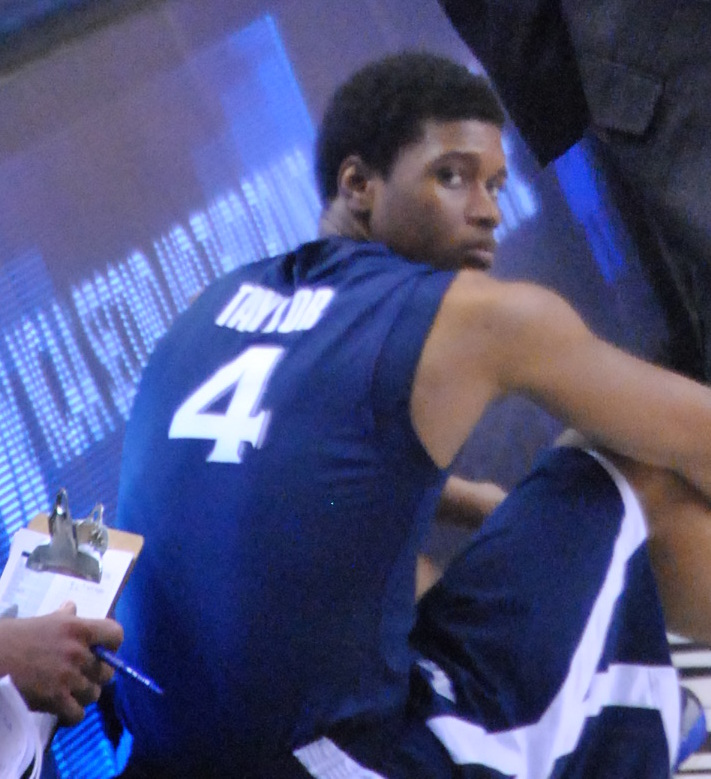
- Taylor in March 2012

No. 42 – Keravnos
- Position: Center
- League: Cyprus Basketball Division 1

Personal information
- Born: April 25, 1990 (age 36) Irvington, New Jersey, U.S.
- Listed height: 6 ft 8 in (2.03 m)
- Listed weight: 220 lb (100 kg)

Career information
- High school: Union (Union Township, New Jersey)
- College: Monmouth (2008–2010); Xavier (2011–2013)
- NBA draft: 2013: undrafted
- Playing career: 2013–present

Career history
- 2013–2015: Güssing Knights
- 2015: STB Le Havre
- 2016: Soproni KC
- 2016–2017: Fribourg Olympic
- 2017–2018: Rilski Sportist
- 2018: Löwen Braunschweig
- 2018–2019: Bandırma Kırmızı
- 2019–2021: Egis Körmend
- 2021–2022: Bakken Bears
- 2022–2023: Blu Basket 1971
- 2023–2025: Keravnos
- 2025–: AEL Limassol B.C.

Career highlights
- FIBA Europe Cup rebounding leader (2024); Cypriot League champion (2024); 2x Cypriot Cup winner (2024, 2025); Cypriot Super Cup winner (2023); Bulgarian Cup winner (2018); ÖBL Most Valuable Player (2015); 2× ÖBL champion (2014, 2015); Austrian Cup winner (2015)

Travis Taylor (born April 25, 1990) is an American professional basketball player for AEL Limassol of the Cyprus Basketball Division 1. He played college basketball for Monmouth and later Xavier.

== Career ==
After going undrafted at the 2013 NBA draft, Taylor joined the Austrian club Güssing Knights where he played for the next two seasons.

On July 3, 2015, he signed with the French club STB Le Havre. On November 19, 2015, he parted ways with Le Havre after appearing in seven league games and three FIBA Europe Cup games. In February 2016, he signed with Hungarian club Soproni KC for the rest of the 2015–16 NB I/A season.

On August 23, 2016, he signed with Fribourg Olympic for the 2016–17 Championnat LNA season.

In July 2017, he signed with Bulgarian club Rilski Sportist for the 2017–18 season.

On August 3, 2018, he has signed with Löwen Braunschweig of the Basketball Bundesliga.

On December 2, 2018, he has signed with Bandırma Kırmızı of the Turkish Basketball First League.

On July 28, 2019, he has signed with Egis Körmend of the NB I/A.

On August 12, 2021, he has signed with Bakken Bears of the Basketligaen.

== Honours and titles ==
=== Club ===
Güssing Knights

- 2× Österreichische Basketball Bundesliga: 2013–14, 2014–15
- Austrian Cup: 2015

Rilski Sportist

- Bulgarian Cup: 2018

=== Individual ===
- ÖBL Most Valuable Player: 2014–15
