= Anthony Shavies =

American basketball player

Personal information
- Born: September 9, 1983 (age 43) Oakland, California
- Listed height: 6 ft 3 in (1.91 m)
- Listed weight: 190 lb (86 kg)

Career information
- High school: Hayward (Oakland, California)
- College: Chabot College (2001–2003); Missouri State (2003–2005)
- NBA draft: 2005: undrafted
- Playing career: 2005–2014
- Position: Point guard
- Number: 6

Career history
- 2005–2006: Güssing Knights
- 2006–2007: Wörthersee Piraten
- 2007–2012: Panthers Fürstenfeld
- 2012–2013: MBC Mykolaiv
- 2013–2014: Güssing Knights

Career highlights
- 2× Austrian League champion (2008, 2014); 2× ÖBL Finals MVP (2008, 2014); MVC All-Defensive Team (2005)

Anthony Shavies (born September 9, 1983) is an American former professional basketball player.

== Professional career ==
In his first two seasons Shavies played in Austria for Güssing Knights and Wörthersee Piraten. In 2007, he left for Panthers Fürstenfeld, he played with the Panthers for four straight seasons.

In the 2012–13 season he played for MBC Mykolaiv in Ukraine and averaged around 9 points per game.

In 2013 Shavies returned to Güssing, when he signed a one-year contract. He won the title with the Knights, after they beat Kapfenberg 3–2 in the Finals. Shavies was named Finals MVP for the second time in his career.
