= Fabricio Vay =

Argentine-Italian basketball player (born 1986)

Fabricio Fay
No. 4 – Arkadia Traiskirchen Lions
- Position: Small forward
- League: ABL

Personal information
- Born: March 26, 1986 (age 40)
- Listed height: 6 ft 9 in (2.06 m)
- Listed weight: 185 lb (84 kg)

Career information
- NBA draft: 2008: undrafted
- Playing career: 2008–present

Career history
- 2004–2005: Valencia
- 2004–2005: → Castelló
- 2005–2006: Arkadia Traiskirchen Lions
- 2006–2007: Akasvayu Vic
- 2007–2008: Iowa Energy
- 2009–2010: PVSK Panthers
- 2010–present: Arkadia Traiskirchen Lions
- 2012–2013: SAV Vacallo
- 2012–2013: Gimnasia Indalo

Career highlights
- ÖBL Most Valuable Player (2011); ÖBL scoring champion (2016)

Fabricio David Vay (born March 26, 1986) is an Argentine-Italian professional basketball player. Vay plays for the Austrian team Arkadia Traiskirchen Lions since 2005, but has played for multiple different teams as well during his period with the Lions.

== Personal ==
Vay owns the Italian nationality under the Bosman ruling.
