= De'Teri Mayes =

Austrian-American basketball player

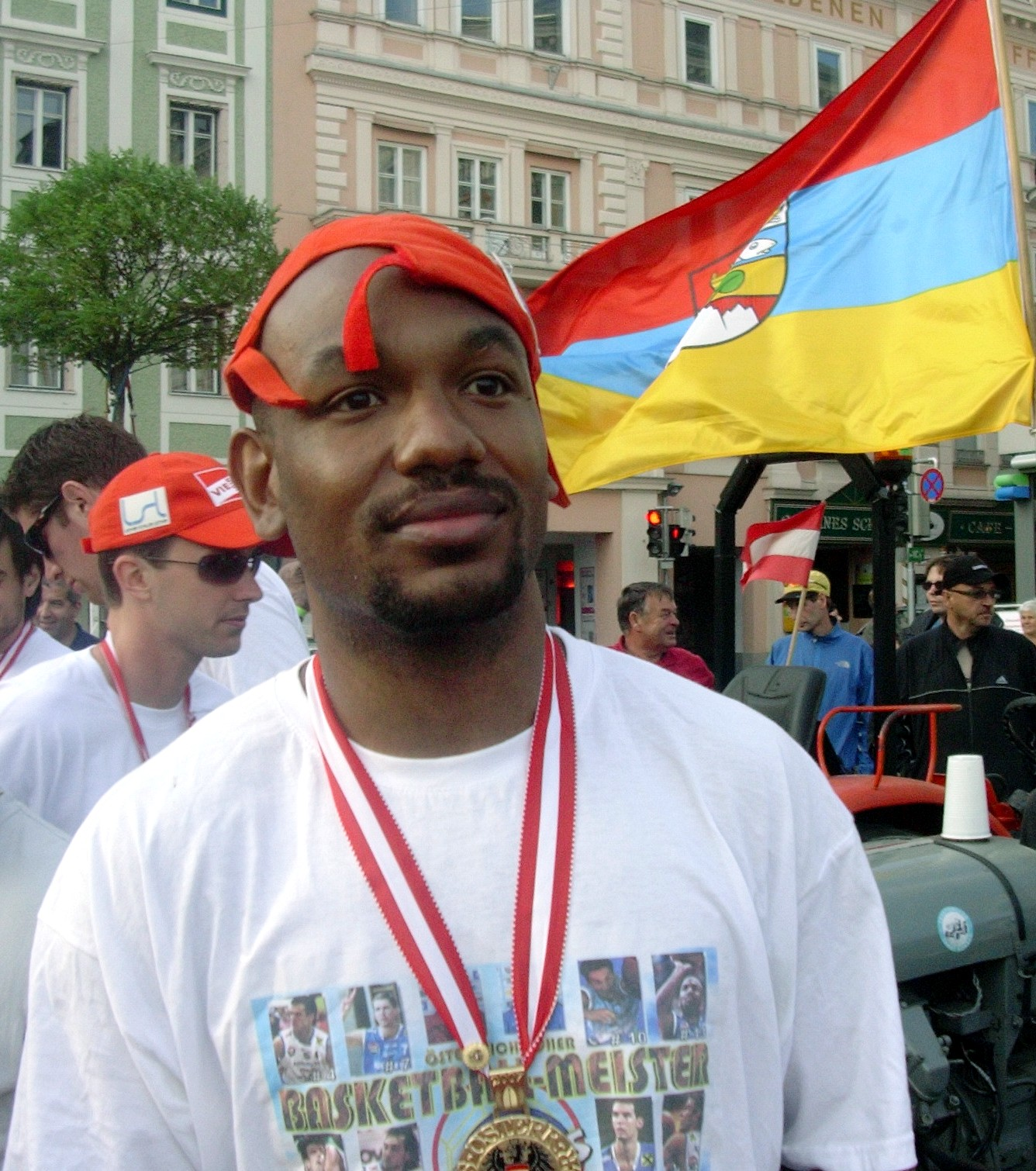

Personal information
- Born: August 5, 1974 (age 52) Montgomery, Alabama, U.S.
- Listed height: 6 ft 3 in (1.91 m)

Career information
- High school: Montgomery Catholic Prep (Montgomery, Alabama)
- College: Wallace State CC (1994–1996); Murray State (1996–1998)
- NBA draft: 1998: undrafted
- Playing career: 1999–2013
- Position: Shooting guard
- Number: 8, 13

Career history
- 1999–2011: Allianz Swans Gmunden
- 2011–2013: Kapfenberg Bulls

Career highlights
- ULEB Cup Top Scorer (2008); 5× ÖBL Most Valuable Player (2003, 2004, 2006, 2007, 2010); 2× ÖBL Finals MVP (2004, 2010); OVC Player of the Year (1998)

De'Teri Mayes (born August 5, 1974) is a former Austrian-American professional basketball player.

== Professional career ==
Mayes played in the top-tier level Austrian league, the ÖBL, with the Allianz Swans Gmunden, from the 1999–2000 season, through the 2010–11 season. He also played two seasons with the Austrian club Kapfenberg Bulls, after he signed with them in 2011. He won five Austrian ÖBL Most Valuable Player awards, two ÖBL Finals MVP awards, and two Austrian Cup MVP awards, in his career, which makes him one of the best players ever to have played in Austria.

== Honours ==
Austria

- Österreichische Bundesliga (4): 2004–05, 2005–06, 2006–07, 2009–10
- Austrian Cup (3): 2002–03, 2003–04, 2007–08
- Austrian Supercup (4): 2004, 2005, 2006, 2007

Individual awards:

- ÖBL Most Valuable Player (5): 2002–03, 2003–04, 2005–06, 2006–07, 2009–10
- ÖBL Finals MVP (2): 2006–07, 2009–10
- Austrian Cup MVP (2): 2003–04, 2007–08
- Austrian Supercup MVP (2): 2005, 2006
- ÖBL All-Star (5): 2001, 2003, 2004, 2005, 2006
