= Petras Balocka =

Lithuanian basketball player

Personal information
- Born: October 8, 1986 (age 40) Vilnius, Lithuanian SSR, Soviet Union
- Listed height: 6 ft 9 in (2.06 m)
- Listed weight: 249 lb (113 kg)

Career information
- College: East Tennessee State (2006–2007); Pensacola State (2007–2008); Hawaii (2008–2010)
- NBA draft: 2010: undrafted
- Playing career: 2010–2015
- Position: Power forward

Career history
- 2010: Lietuvos rytas
- 2010: →Perlas
- 2010: Sokhumi Tbilisi
- 2010–2011: Liévin Basket 62
- 2011–2012: Norrköping Dolphins
- 2012: Sakalai
- 2012: Kazma
- 2013: Challans
- 2013–2015: Raiffeisen Panthers Fürstenfeld
- 2015: KK Grosuplje

Petras Balocka (born October 9, 1986) is a Lithuanian former professional basketball player. Throughout his career, Balocka played for teams in Lithuania, Georgia, France, Sweden, Kuwait, and Austria.

== Honors ==
- ÖBL rebounding leader (2014)
