= 2015–16 Austrian Basketball Bundesliga =

2015–16 Admiral Basketball Bundesliga^{1}
- Season: 2015–16
- Games played: 36
- Teams: 10

Regular season
- Season MVP: (United States) Quincy Diggs

Finals
- Champions: Redwell Gunners Oberwart (2nd title)
- Runners-up: WBC Raiffeisen Wels
- Finals MVP: (United States) Chris McNealy

Statistical leaders
Points	(Argentina) Fabricio Vay	20.4
Rebounds	(Lithuania) Povilas Gaidys	9.5
Assists	(Slovenia) Boban Tomic	6.9
- ^{1} Sponsored league name, referring to Admiral.

The 2015–16 Österreichische Basketball Bundesliga season, for sponsorships reasons named the Admiral Basketball Bundesliga, was the 70th season of the first tier of basketball in Austria.

== Teams ==
Location of teams in 2015–16 ÖBL

Club	Place	Arena	Capacity
Swans Gmunden	Gmunden	Volksbank Arena	2,200
WBC Raiffeisen Wels	Wels	Raiffeisen Arena	1,700
Raiffeisen Panthers Fürstenfeld	Fürstenfeld	Stadthalle Fürstenfeld	1,200
Arkadia Traiskirchen Lions	Traiskirchen	Lions Dome	1,200
ece Bulls Kapfenberg	Kapfenberg	Sporthalle Walfersam	1,000
Hallmann Vienna	Wien	Wiener Stadthalle B	1,000
Redwell Gunners Oberwart	Oberwart	Sporthalle Oberwart	2,500
Xion Dukes Klosterneuburg	Klosterneuburg	Happyland Klosterneuburg	1,000
Magnofit Güssing Knights	Güssing	Aktiv Park Güssing	800
Raiffeisen Graz	Graz	Unionhalle	600

=== Managerial changes ===
Team	Outgoing manager	Manner of departure	Date of vacancy	Position in table	Incoming manager	Date of appointment
Swans Gmunden	(Serbia) Kresimir Basic	End of contract	–	Pre-season	(Austria) Bernd Wimmer	March 21, 2015
WBC Raifeissen Wels	(United States) Ken Scalabroni	End of contract	–	Pre-season	(Austria) Mike Coffin	May 21, 2015
Hallmann Vienna	(Italy) Andrea Maghelli	End of contract	–	Pre-season	(Austria) Zoran Kostic	July 4, 2015
Redwell Gunners Oberwart	(Netherlands) Erik Braal	Left for Donar Groningen	–	Pre-season	(Greece) Chris Chougaz	July 31, 2015

=== Standings ===
Pos	Team	Pld	W	L	PF	PA	PD	Pts	Qualification
1	Redwell Gunners Oberwart	32	21	11	2486	2311	+175	42	Advance to the Playoffs
2	WBC Raiffeisen Wels	32	18	14	2578	2445	+133	36	Advance to the Playoffs
3	Arkadia Traiskirchen Lions	32	18	14	2469	2351	+118	36	Advance to the Playoffs
4	Hallmann Vienna	32	17	15	2506	2474	+32	34	Advance to the Playoffs
5	Raiffeisen Fürstenfeld Panthers	32	17	15	2378	2408	−30	34	Advance to the Playoffs
6	Klosterneuburg Dukes	32	17	15	2461	2482	−21	34	Advance to the Playoffs
7	ece Bulls Kapfenberg	32	15	17	2523	2522	+1	30	Advance to the Playoffs
8	Swans Gmunden	32	13	19	2462	2505	−43	26	Advance to the Playoffs
9	UBSC Raiffeisen Graz	32	8	24	2317	2682	−365	16	
10	magnofit Güssing Knights (Note: Güssing Knights were initially deducted 9 points due to licence infringement. Finally, its licence was revoked after the round 33.) (D)	0	0	0	0	0	0	0	Disqualified

Source: Eurobasket, ABL
(D) Disqualified

== Playoffs ==
Quarterfinals
1	Redwell Oberwart Gunners	3
8	Swans Gmunden	2
4	Hallmann Vienna	3
5	Raiffeisen Fürstenfeld Panthers	0
2	WBC Raiffeisen Wels	3
7	ece Bulls Kapfenberg	0
3	Arkadia Traiskirchen Lions	3
6	Klosterneuburg Dukes	0

Semifinals
1	Redwell Oberwart Gunners	3
4	Hallmann Vienna	1
2	WBC Raiffeisen Wels	3
3	Arkadia Traiskirchen Lions	2

Finals
1	Redwell Oberwart Gunners	3
2	WBC Raiffeisen Wels	0

== Austrian clubs in international competitions ==
Team	Competition	Progress
Magnofit Güssing Knights	FIBA Europe Cup	
ece Bulls Kapfenberg	FIBA Europe Cup	

Team	Competition	Progress
Arkadia Traiskirchen Lions	Alpe Adria Cup	Quarterfinals
Klosterneuburg Dukes	Alpe Adria Cup	Quarterfinals
