= Marko Car (basketball) =

Croatian basketball player

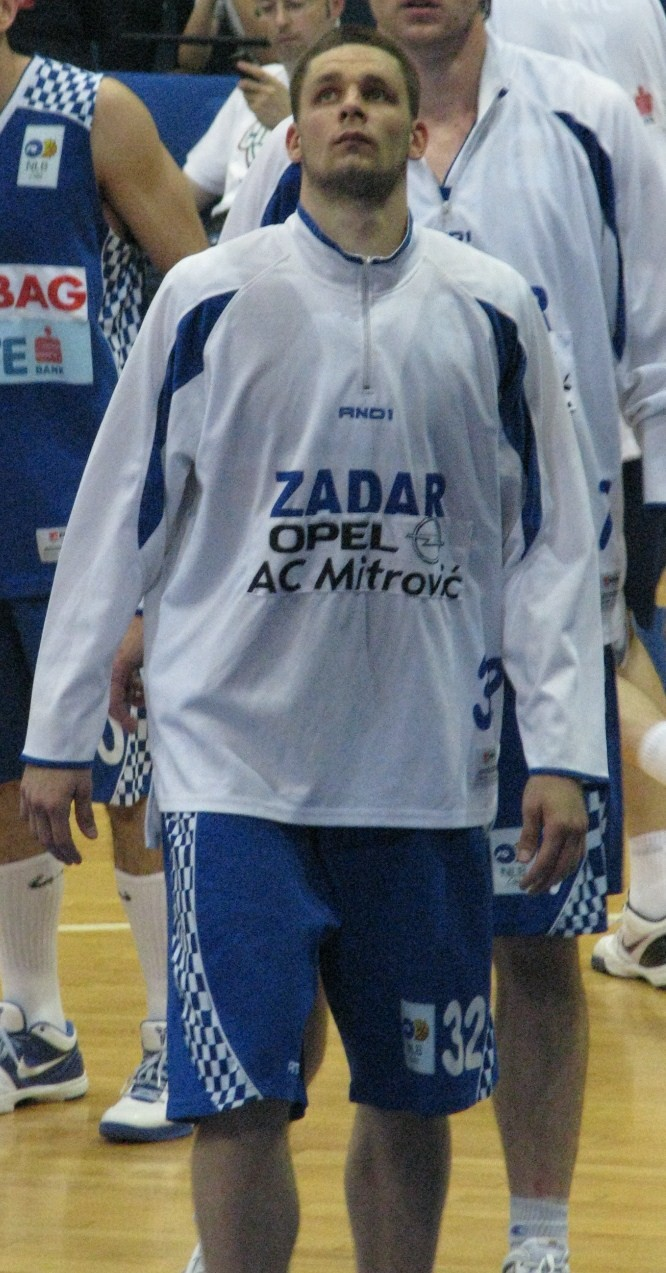
- Car in 2010

No. 7 – UBSC Graz
- Position: Shooting guard
- League: Austrian Basketball Superliga

Personal information
- Born: October 21, 1985 (age 41) Karlovac, SR Croatia, SFR Yugoslavia
- Listed height: 6 ft 2 in (1.88 m)

Career information
- NBA draft: 2007: undrafted
- Playing career: 2002–present

Career history
- 2002–2006: Šanac Karlovac
- 2006–2008: Split
- 2008: KK Osijek 2006
- 2008: Egaleo
- 2008–2009: ETHA Engomis
- 2009–2011: Zadar
- 2011–2012: Cedevita Zagreb
- 2013: Zagreb
- 2013: Zadar
- 2014: Kolossos Rodou
- 2014–2018: Panthers Fürstenfeld
- 2018: Cuore Napoli Basket
- 2018–2019: Panthers Fürstenfeld
- 2019–present: UBSC Graz

Career highlights
- Croatian Cup winner (2012)
Medals
Men's basketball
Representing Croatia
Mediterranean Games
| Gold medal – first place | 2009 Pescara | Team competition |

Marko Car (born 21 October 1985) is a Croatian professional basketball player for UBSC Graz of the Austrian Basketball Superliga.
