= 2017–18 Austrian Basketball Bundesliga =

2017–18 Admiral Basketball Bundesliga^{1}
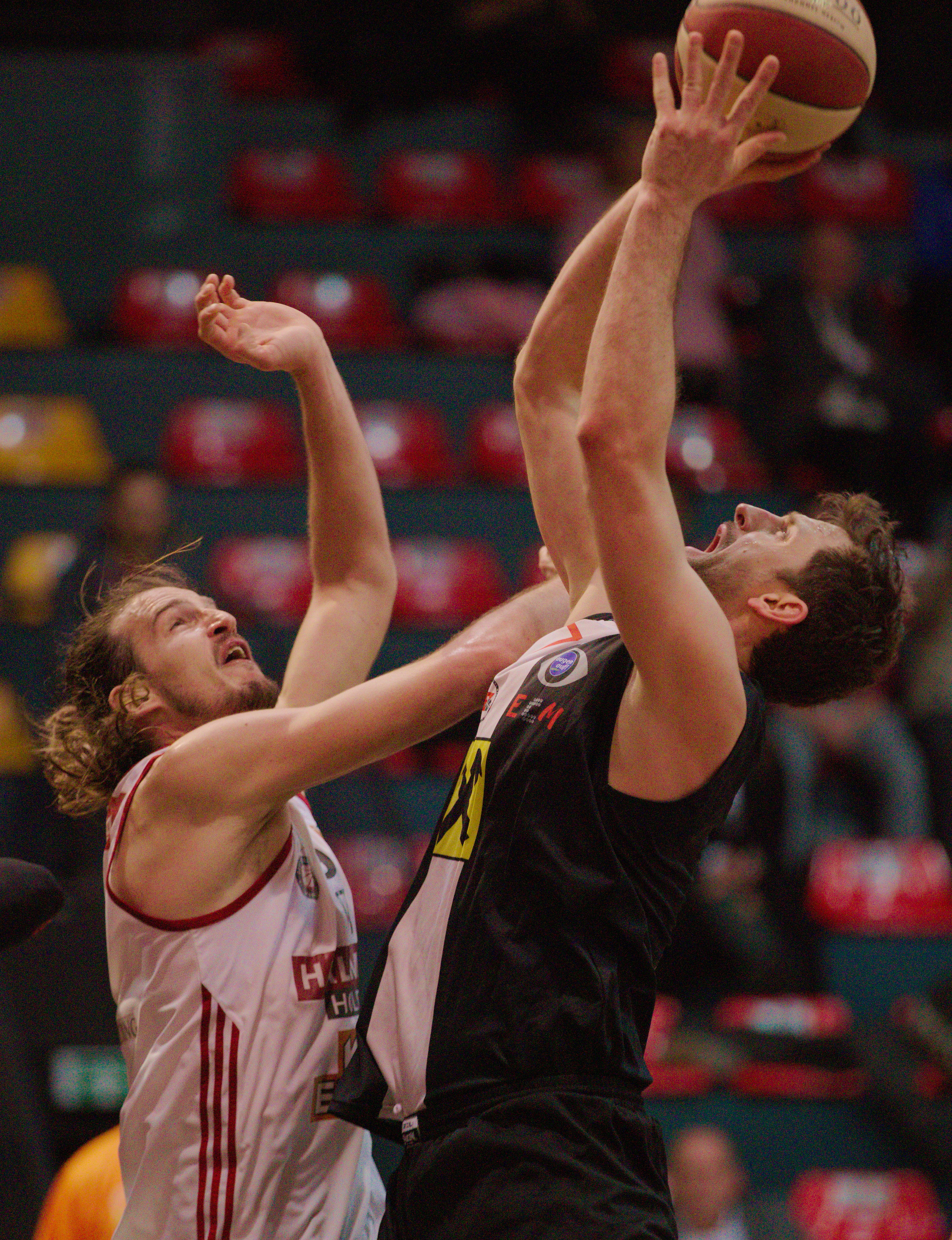
- Jiří Hubálek (left, representing Hallmann Vienna) defending against Davor Lamešić (Raiffeisen Flyers Wels) in the Bundesliga match on 21 January 2018
- Season: 2017–18
- Teams: 9

Regular season
- Season MVP: Stjepan Stazić (Vienna)

Finals
- Champions: ece Bulls Kapfenberg (6th title)
- Runners-up: Swans Gmunden
- ^{1} Sponsored league name, referring to Admiral Sportwetten.

The 2017–18 Austrian Basketball Bundesliga season, for sponsorships reasons named the Admiral Basketball Bundesliga, is the 72nd season of the first tier of basketball in Austria.

== Teams ==
Location of teams in 2017–18 ÖBL

Raiffeisen Flyers Wels replaced WBC Wels, from the same city.

| Club | Place | Arena | Capacity |
|---|---|---|---|
| Swans Gmunden | Gmunden | Volksbank Arena | 2,200 |
| Raiffeisen Panthers Fürstenfeld | Fürstenfeld | Stadthalle Fürstenfeld | 1,200 |
| Arkadia Traiskirchen Lions | Traiskirchen | Lions Dome | 1,200 |
| ece Bulls Kapfenberg | Kapfenberg | Sporthalle Walfersam | 1,000 |
| Hallmann Vienna | Vienna | Wiener Stadthalle B | 1,000 |
| Raiffeisen Flyers Wels | Wels | Raiffeisen Arena | 1,700 |
| Redwell Gunners Oberwart | Oberwart | Sporthalle Oberwart | 2,500 |
| Xion Dukes Klosterneuburg | Klosterneuburg | Happyland Klosterneuburg | 1,000 |
| UBSC Raiffeisen Graz | Graz | Unionhalle | 600 |

== Regular season ==
=== Standings ===
| Pos | Team | Pld | W | L | PF | PA | PD | Pts | Qualification |
|---|---|---|---|---|---|---|---|---|---|
| 1 | ece Bulls Kapfenberg | 32 | 26 | 6 | 2693 | 2259 | +434 | 52 | Qualification to semifinals |
| 2 | Arkadia Traiskirchen Lions | 32 | 23 | 9 | 2625 | 2356 | +269 | 46 | Qualification to semifinals |
| 3 | Swans Gmunden | 32 | 22 | 10 | 2707 | 2517 | +190 | 44 | Qualification to quarterfinals |
| 4 | Raiffeisen Flyers Wels | 32 | 17 | 15 | 2726 | 2705 | +21 | 34 | Qualification to quarterfinals |
| 5 | Hallmann Vienna | 32 | 17 | 15 | 2833 | 2801 | +32 | 34 | Qualification to quarterfinals |
| 6 | Klosterneuburg Dukes | 32 | 14 | 18 | 2643 | 2538 | +105 | 28 | Qualification to quarterfinals |
| 7 | Redwell Gunners Oberwart | 32 | 13 | 19 | 2508 | 2599 | −91 | 26 | |
| 8 | Raiffeisen Fürstenfeld Panthers | 32 | 9 | 23 | 2387 | 2663 | −276 | 18 | |
| 9 | UBSC Raiffeisen Graz | 32 | 3 | 29 | 2275 | 2959 | −684 | 6 | |

Source: ÖBL

== Play-offs ==
Quarterfinals were played in a best-of-three games format, semifinals in a 2–2–1 format and the final in a best-of-seven format 2–2–1–1–1.

=== Bracket ===
Quarterfinals
4 Raiffeisen Flyers Wels | 0
5 Hallmann Vienna | 2
3 Swans Gmunden | 2
6 Klosterneuburg Dukes | 1

Semifinals
1 ece Bulls Kapfenberg | 3
5 Hallmann Vienna | 0
2 Arkadia Traiskirchen Lions | 0
3 Swans Gmunden | 3

Finals
1 ece Bulls Kapfenberg | 4
3 Swans Gmunden | 2

=== Quarterfinals ===
The team with the higher seed played game one and three (if necessary) at home.

| Team 1 | Series | Team 2 | Game 1 | Game 2 | Game 3 |
|---|---|---|---|---|---|
| Swans Gmunden | 2–1 | Klosterneuburg Dukes | 76–67 | 74–82 | 63–61 |
| Raiffeisen Flyers Wels | 0–2 | Hallmann Vienna | 79–86 | 60–91 | |

=== Semifinals ===
The team with the higher seed played game one, two and 5 (if necessary) at home.

| Team 1 | Series | Team 2 | Game 1 | Game 2 | Game 3 | Game 4 | Game 5 |
|---|---|---|---|---|---|---|---|
| ece Bulls Kapfenberg | 3–0 | Hallmann Vienna | 97–72 | 96–68 | 92–78 | | |
| Arkadia Traiskirchen Lions | 0–3 | Swans Gmunden | 66–68 | 81–89 | 77–84 | | |

=== Semifinals ===
The team with the higher seed played game one, two, five and seven (if necessary) at home.

| Team 1 | Series | Team 2 | Game 1 | Game 2 | Game 3 | Game 4 | Game 5 | Game 6 | Game 7 |
|---|---|---|---|---|---|---|---|---|---|
| ece Bulls Kapfenberg | 4–2 | Swans Gmunden | 73–74 | 82–79 | 69–78 | 79–75 | 69–53 | 95–92 | |

== Clubs in European competitions ==
| Team | Competition | Progress | Ref |
|---|---|---|---|
| ece Bulls Kapfenberg | Champions League | First qualifying round | |
| ece Bulls Kapfenberg | FIBA Europe Cup | Regular season | |

== Clubs in international competitions ==
| Team | Competition | Progress |
|---|---|---|
| Klosterneuburg Dukes | Alpe Adria Cup | Regular season |
| Hallman Vienna | Alpe Adria Cup | Regular season |
| Raiffeisen Graz | Alpe Adria Cup | Regular season |
