= Ian Boylan =

American professional basketball player

Free agent
- Position: Small forward

Personal information
- Born: May 6, 1983 (age 43) Norman, Oklahoma
- Listed height: 6 ft 6 in (1.98 m)
- Listed weight: 216 lb (98 kg)

Career information
- High school: Norman (Norman, Oklahoma)
- College: Cal State Northridge (2001–2005)
- NBA draft: 2005: undrafted
- Playing career: 2005–present

Career history
- 2006–2008: Allianz Swans Gmunden
- 2008–2009: Anwil Włocławek
- 2009–2011: Allianz Swans Gmunden
- 2011–2012: BBC Monthey
- 2012–2013: Zepter Vienna
- 2013–2015: ece Bulls Kapfenberg

Career highlights
- 3x Austrian Champion (2007, 2010, 2013); Austrian Supercup MVP (2014)

Ian Dale Boylan (born May 6, 1983) is an American professional basketball player who last played for Kapfenberg Bulls. He spent most of his career in Austria, playing for several teams.

In August 2013, Boylan signed with Kapfenberg Bulls.

== Honours ==
- 3x Austrian Bundesliga (2007, 2010, 2013)
- Austrian Cup (2014)
- Austrian Supercup (2014)

Individual:

- ÖBL assists leader (2014)
- Austrian Supercup MVP (2014)
