= Chris McNealy (basketball, born 1992) =

American basketball player

Personal information
- Born: April 30, 1992 (age 34)
- Listed height: 6 ft 4 in (1.93 m)
- Listed weight: 195 lb (88 kg)

Career information
- High school: San Ramon Valley (Danville, California)
- College: UC Irvine (2010–2014)
- NBA draft: 2014: undrafted
- Playing career: 2015–present
- Position: Shooting guard

Career history
- 2015–2017: Oberwart Gunners
- 2017–2018: Panionios
- 2018: Ura Basket

Career highlights
- Austrian League Finals MVP (2016); Austrian League champion (2016); Austrian Cup winner (2016); First-team All-Big West (2014)

Christopher McNealy (born April 30, 1992) is an American professional basketball player. Standing at 1.93 metres (6 feet 4 inches), he plays the Shooting guard position. After playing four years of college basketball with UC Irvine, McNealy entered the 2014 NBA draft, but he was not selected in the draft's two rounds.

== High school career ==
McNealy played high school basketball at San Ramon Valley High School in Danville, California. McNealy was named the NorCal Preps Division I Player of the Year and he earned All-State Division I honors Cal-Hi Sports as asenior at San Ramon Valley High School. He also earned All-East Bay and All-Bay Area distinction and was named the MVP in the East Bay Athletic League. As a senior under coach John Raynor, he averaged 20.5 points and 5.0 rebounds per game.

== College career ==
As a freshman at UC Irvine, McNealy played in 31 games averaging 5.0 points, 2.2 rebounds and 0.9 assists per game. During the next three seasons, his numbers improved and as a senior, he was named to the All-Big West first team, after averaging 11 points, 4.3 rebounds and 3.3 assists per game.

== Professional career ==
After going undrafted in the 2014 NBA draft, McNealy was selected in Round 6 from Sioux Falls Skyforce with Pick 15 in the 2014 NBA Development League Draft. However, he was waived on November 13 from the Skyforce. For the 2015–16 season, McNealy joined Oberwart Gunners of the Austrian League. At the end of the season, McNealy won both the Austrian League and the Austrian Cup and was voted as the Austrian League Finals MVP. He renewed his contract for another season with the Gunners.

On November 5, 2017, McNealy joined Panionios of the Greek Basket League, replacing Avry Holmes on the team's squad.

== Personal life ==
McNealy's father Chris played professional basketball for the New York Knicks and in Italy and Spain.
