= Flyers Wels =

Professional basketball club in Wels, Austria

Raiffeisen Flyers Wels
- Leagues: ÖBL
- Founded: 2000; 25 years ago
- History: Sparkasse Wels (2000–2009); WBC Wels (2009–2017); Flyers Wels (2017–present)
- Arena: Raiffeisen Arena
- Capacity: 1,700
- Location: Wels, Austria
- Team colors: Red, White, Black
- Main sponsor: Raiffeisen
- Championships: 1 Austrian Championship; 1 Austrian Cup
- Website: www.flyerswels.at
Home	Away

Raiffeisen Flyers Wels, formerly WBC Wels, is a professional basketball club based in Wels, Austria. The team has been playing in the Austrian Basketball League since it was founded in 2000. In 2009 the team won the Austrian national championship. The club was founded as Welser Basketball Club in 2000 through a merger of the clubs Union Wels and ABC Sparkasse Wels.

== Trophies ==
Former logo, used until 2017

- Austrian Championship
  - Winners (1): 2008–09
- Austrian Cup
  - Winners (2): 2005–06, 2023-24

== Season by season ==
Season	Tier	League	Pos.	Austrian Cup	European competitions	
WBC Wels
2008–09	1	ÖBL	1st	Runner-up		
2009–10	1	ÖBL	5th		3 EuroChallenge	RS
2010–11	1	ÖBL	7th	Quarterfinalist		
2011–12	1	ÖBL	4th			
2012–13	1	ÖBL	5th	Semifinalist		
2013–14	1	ÖBL	4th	Semifinalist		
2014–15	1	ÖBL	6th	Runner-up		
2015–16	1	ÖBL	2nd	Semifinalist		
2016–17	1	ÖBL	4th	Semifinalist		
Flyers Wels
2017–18	1	ÖBL	5th	Semifinalist		
2018–19	1	ÖBL	5th	Quarterfinalist		

== Players ==
=== Notable players ===
Note: Flags indicate national team eligibility at FIBA-sanctioned events. Players may hold other non-FIBA nationalities not displayed.

Criteria

To appear in this section a player must have either:

- Set a club record or won an individual award while at the club
- Played at least one official international match for their national team at any time
- Played at least one official NBA match at any time.

- (United States) Ricky Moore
- (Kosovo) (United States) Jaren Sina
- (Croatia) Andro Knego
- (United States) Quentin Pryor
- (United States) Ali Farokhmanesh
- (United States) Tyler Tiedeman
- (United States) DeJuan Wright
- (United States) Chase Jeter
