= BSC Fürstenfeld Panthers =

Professional basketball club in Fürstenfeld, Austria

Raiffeisen Panthers Fürstenfeld
- Leagues: 2. ÖBL
- Founded: 1955; 70 years ago
- Arena: Stadthalle Fürstenfeld
- Capacity: 1,200
- Team colors: Black, White and Orange
- Main sponsor: Raiffeisen
- President: Heinz Brandl
- Championships: 1 Austrian Championship; 1 Austrian Cup; 1 Austrian Supercup
- Website: panthers.at
Home	Away

BSC Panthers Fürstenfeld is an Austrian professional basketball club based in Fürstenfeld. The club was founded in 1955 and won the Austrian national championship one time: in the 2008–09 season.

Fürstenfeld participated in European competitions once, when it played in the FIBA Korać Cup in the 1995–96 season.

== Honours ==
- Austrian Championship (1):

2008
Runner-up: 2002, 2010

- Austrian Cup (1):

2009

- Austrian Supercup (1):

2009

== Season by season ==
Season	Tier	League	Pos.	Austrian Cup	European competitions
2010–11	1	ÖBL	4th	Runner-up	
2011–12	1	ÖBL	7th	Semifinalist	
2012–13	1	ÖBL	8th	Round of 16	
2013–14	1	ÖBL	8th	Round of 16	
2014–15	1	ÖBL	9th	Round of 16	
2015–16	1	ÖBL	6th	Quarterfinalist	
2016–17	1	ÖBL	7th	Quarterfinalist	
2017–18	1	ÖBL	8th	Semifinalist	
2018–19	1	ÖBL	10th	Round of 16	

== Notable players ==
Note: Flags indicate national team eligibility at FIBA-sanctioned events. Players may hold other non-FIBA nationalities not displayed.

Criteria

To appear in this section a player must have either:

- Set a club record or won an individual award while at the club
- Played at least one official international match for their national team at any time
- Played at least one official NBA match at any time.

- (Canada) Michael Fraser
- (Croatia) Marko Car
- (Serbia) Miljan Goljović
- (Georgia (country)) Giorgi Gamqrelidze
- (United States) Jonathan Levy
- (United States) Anthony Shavies
- (United States) Desmond Penigar
