= Swans Gmunden =

Professional basketball club in Gmunden, Austria

- Leagues: Austrian Basketball League
- Founded: 1966
- Arena: Volksbank-Arena
- Capacity: 2,200
- Location: Gmunden, Austria
- Team colors: Blue, Black, White
- Championships: 5 Austrian Championships; 6 Austrian Cups; 8 Austrian Supercups
- Website: www.basketswans.at
Home	Away

Basket Swans Gmunden is an Austrian professional basketball club that is based in Gmunden. Their home arena is Volksbank-Arena Gmunden. The club has won the Austrian Bundesliga six times, its most recent being in 2023. To add to that, the Swans have won seven national Cups as well. The main sponsor of the team used to be Allianz for a long period, in which the team was known as Allianz Swans Gmunden.

== History ==
The Allianz Swans logo, used until 2014

The team was founded in 1965, as the basketball section of Union Gmunden. The first match of Union was played in 1966, it was lost 11–35. After six years, the team eventually promoted all the way to the 2. Bundesliga. Gmunden played seven years in the league, than promoted to the 1. Bundesliga.

The club had its golden years starting from 2003, since then the team started winning trophies in Austria. In 2005, 2006 and 2007 the Swans took the national title. In the 2007–08 season, the first European game of the Swans was played. The team competed in the ULEB Cup, the second tier of European basketball. Swans won the first game on the road against Hapoel Galil Elyon with 74:79. After it survived the regular season, the team lost in the Eight-finals against Joventut Badalona, the eventual ULEB Cup champions.

In 2014, the sponsorship deal with Allianz ended and the team was named just Swans Gmunden.

In the 2020–21 season, coached by Anton Mirolybov, Gmunden won its fifth national championship after a 11-year drought.

== Trophies ==
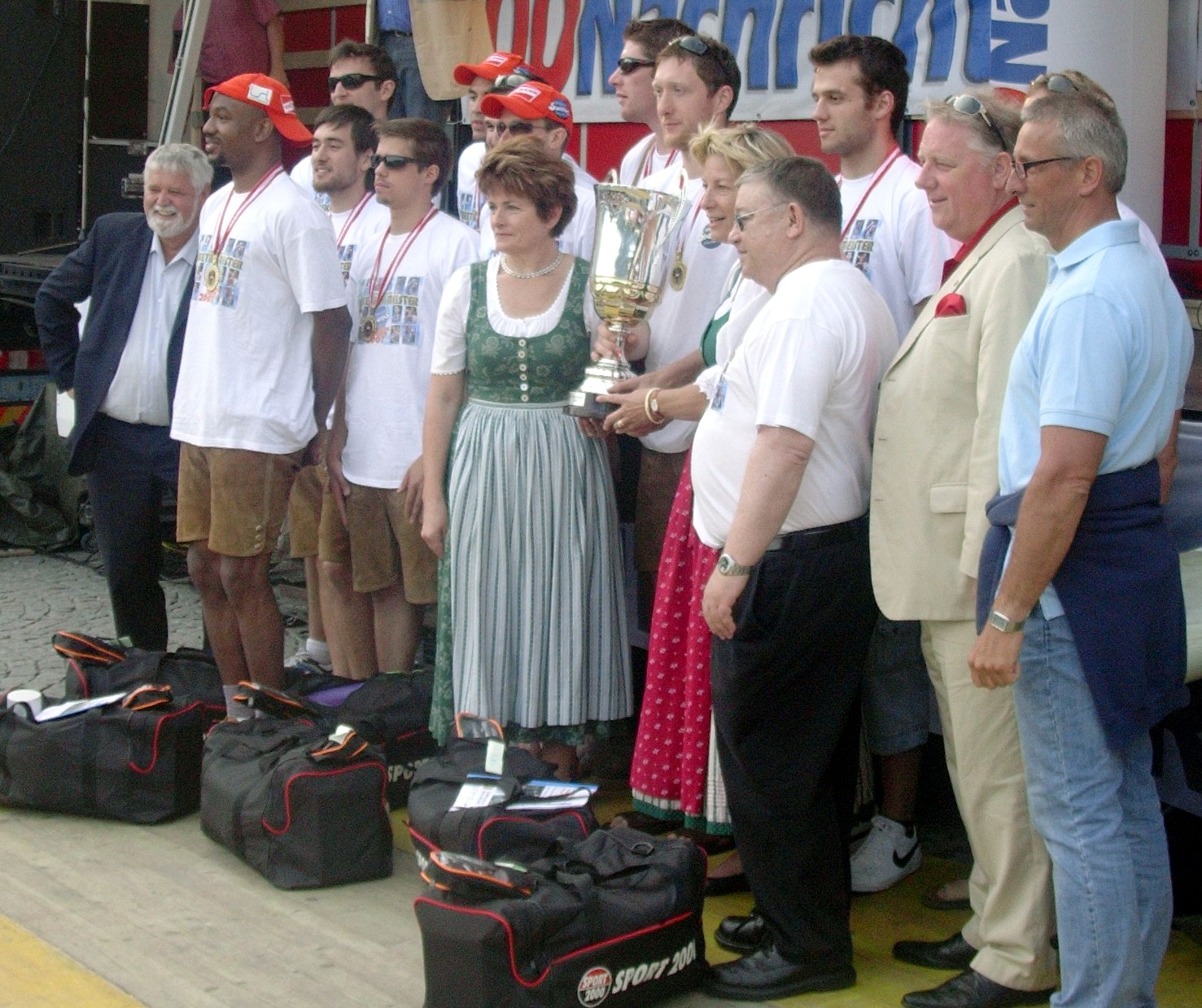
The Swans celebrating the 2007 championship with their team, president and the Mayor of Gmunden

- Österreichische Bundesliga / Superliga: 6

2004–05, 2005–06, 2006–07, 2009-10, 2020–21, 2022–23

- Austrian Cup: 7

2003, 2004, 2008, 2010, 2011, 2012, 2023

- Austrian Supercup: 8

2004, 2005, 2006, 2007, 2008, 2010, 2011, 2021

== Season by season ==
Season	Tier	League	Pos.	Austrian Cup	European competitions	
2007–08	1	ÖBL	3rd		2 ULEB Cup	RS
2008–09	1	ÖBL	2nd	Champion	3 EuroChallenge	RS
2009–10	1	ÖBL	1st			
2010–11	1	ÖBL	2nd	Champion		
2011–12	1	ÖBL	2nd	Champion		
2012–13	1	ÖBL	6th	Quarterfinalist		
2013–14	1	ÖBL	5th	Runner-up		
2014–15	1	ÖBL	4th	Quarterfinalist		
2015–16	1	ÖBL	8th	Quarterfinalist		
2016–17	1	ÖBL	3rd	Semifinalist		
2017–18	1	ÖBL	2nd	Runner-up		
2018–19	1	ÖBL	2nd	Runner-up		
2019–20	1	BSL	– (Note: The 2019–20 season was cancelled due to the coronavirus pandemic.)			
2020–21	1	BSL	1st	Runner-up		
2021–22	1	BSL	2nd		4 FIBA Europe Cup	2QR
2022–23	1	BSL	1st	Champion	4 FIBA Europe Cup	RS
2023–24	1	BSL	5th			
2024–25	1	BSL	4th			

== Current roster ==
Note: Flags indicate national team eligibility at FIBA-sanctioned events. Players may hold other non-FIBA nationalities not displayed.

Allianz Swans Gmunden roster
Players
Coaches

Pos.	No.	Nat.	Name	Ht.	Wt.	Age
G	2	(United States)	Charles, Zachary	2.01 m (6 ft 7 in)		30 – 17 September 1995
F	3	(Austria)	Nemcec, Petar	1.99 m (6 ft 6 in)		26 – 20 February 2000
G	5	(Austria)	Soellner, Jonathan	1.81 m (5 ft 11 in)		23 – 10 February 2003
G	6	(Austria)	Friedrich, Daniel	1.81 m (5 ft 11 in)		34 – 11 February 1992
G	7	(Austria)	Guetti, Benedikt	1.90 m (6 ft 3 in)		32 – 18 February 1994
G	8	(Austria)	Hintenaus, Simon	1.90 m (6 ft 3 in)		23 – 4 October 2002
F	10	(Austria)	Blazan, Toni	1.97 m (6 ft 6 in)		34 – 15 May 1992
G/F	11	(Austria)	Schartmüller, Lukas	1.91 m (6 ft 3 in)		30 – 26 June 1996
C	14	(Austria)	Koeppel, Daniel	2.11 m (6 ft 11 in)		26 – 14 May 2000
PF	20	(United States)	King, Urald	1.98 m (6 ft 6 in)		35 – 13 July 1990
G	23	(United Kingdom)	Lautier-Ogunleye, Dwayne	1.93 m (6 ft 4 in)		30 – 23 June 1996

Head coach

(Finland) Anton Mirolybov

Assistant coach(es)

(Finland) Aleksi Koskinen

Legend

- (C) Team captain
- Injured

- Roster
Updated: August 30, 2022

== Notable players ==
- (Austria) De'Teri Mayes (12 seasons: 1999–2011)
- (Finland) Daniel Dolenc (1 season: 2020–21)
- (Lithuania) Kęstutis Kemzūra (1 season: 2000–01)
- (Lithuania) Darius Dimavičius (2 seasons: 2000–02)
- (United States) Ian Boylan (4 seasons: 2006–08, 2009–11)
- (United States) Robert Arnold (2 seasons: 2011–13)
- (United States) Sharaud Curry (1 season: 2011–12)
- (Austria) (Kosovo) Enis Murati (14 seasons: 2006–15, 2016–21)

Note: Flags indicate national team eligibility at FIBA-sanctioned events. Players may hold other non-FIBA nationalities not displayed.
