= BC Vienna =

Professional basketball club in Vienna, Austria

- Leagues: Austrian Superliga; ABA League; FIBA Europe Cup
- Founded: August 16, 2010; 16 years ago
- History: BC Vienna (2010–present)
- Arena: BC Vienna Arena
- Capacity: 1,399
- Location: Vienna, Austria
- Team colors: Red, Black, White
- Head coach: Dragan Bajić
- Championships: 2 Austrian Championships; 1 Austrian Cup; 1 Austrian Supercup
- Website: bcvienna.com
Home	Away	Third

Basketball Club Vienna is an Austrian professional basketball club based in Vienna. The club competes in the Austrian Superliga, the ABA League, and the FIBA Europe Cup. BC Vienna has won the Austrian championship twice, in 2013 and 2022.

== History ==
Basketball Club Vienna was founded by brothers Petar and Stjepan Stazić on 16 August 2010.

In its third season, Vienna won its first Austrian championship. On 29 May 2013, the club defeated the Oberwart Gunners in the finals of the 2012–13 Austrian Basketball Bundesliga, winning the series 3–2. It was the first Austrian basketball championship won by a club from Vienna since 1991.

On 20 September 2015, Vienna won its first Austrian Supercup title.

The club achieved its first Austrian domestic double in the 2021–22 season. On 6 February 2022, Vienna won the Austrian Cup, and on 31 May 2022 it secured its second Austrian championship after defeating Swans Gmunden 3–1 in the best-of-five finals series.

On 13 September 2022, the club was named Vienna Team of the Year.

During the 2022–23 Alpe Adria Cup, Vienna reached the final of the competition, finishing as runners-up.

In 2025, BC Vienna joined the ABA League for the 2025–26 season, becoming the first Austrian club to compete in the league.

On 30 September 2025, BC Vienna was named Vienna Team of the Year for the second time.

In the 2026–27 season, BC Vienna made its debut in the FIBA Europe Cup.

== Sponsorship names ==
Due to sponsorship reasons, the team has had several names:

- BC Vienna (2001–2013)
- BC Zepter Vienna (2013–2015)
- BC Hallmann Vienna (2015–2020)
- BC GGMT Vienna (2020–2023)
- BC Vienna (2023–present)

== Honours ==
=== Domestic competitions ===
- Austrian Bundesliga (defunct)

Winners (1): 2012–13
Runners-up (1): 2014–15

- Austrian Superliga

Winners (1): 2021–22
Runners-up (1): 2022–23

- Austrian Cup

Winners (1): 2022
Runners-up (2): 2013, 2016

- Austrian Supercup

Winners (1): 2015
Runners-up (3): 2013, 2022, 2023

=== Regional competitions ===
- Alpe Adria Cup

Runners-up (1): 2022–23

== Season by season ==
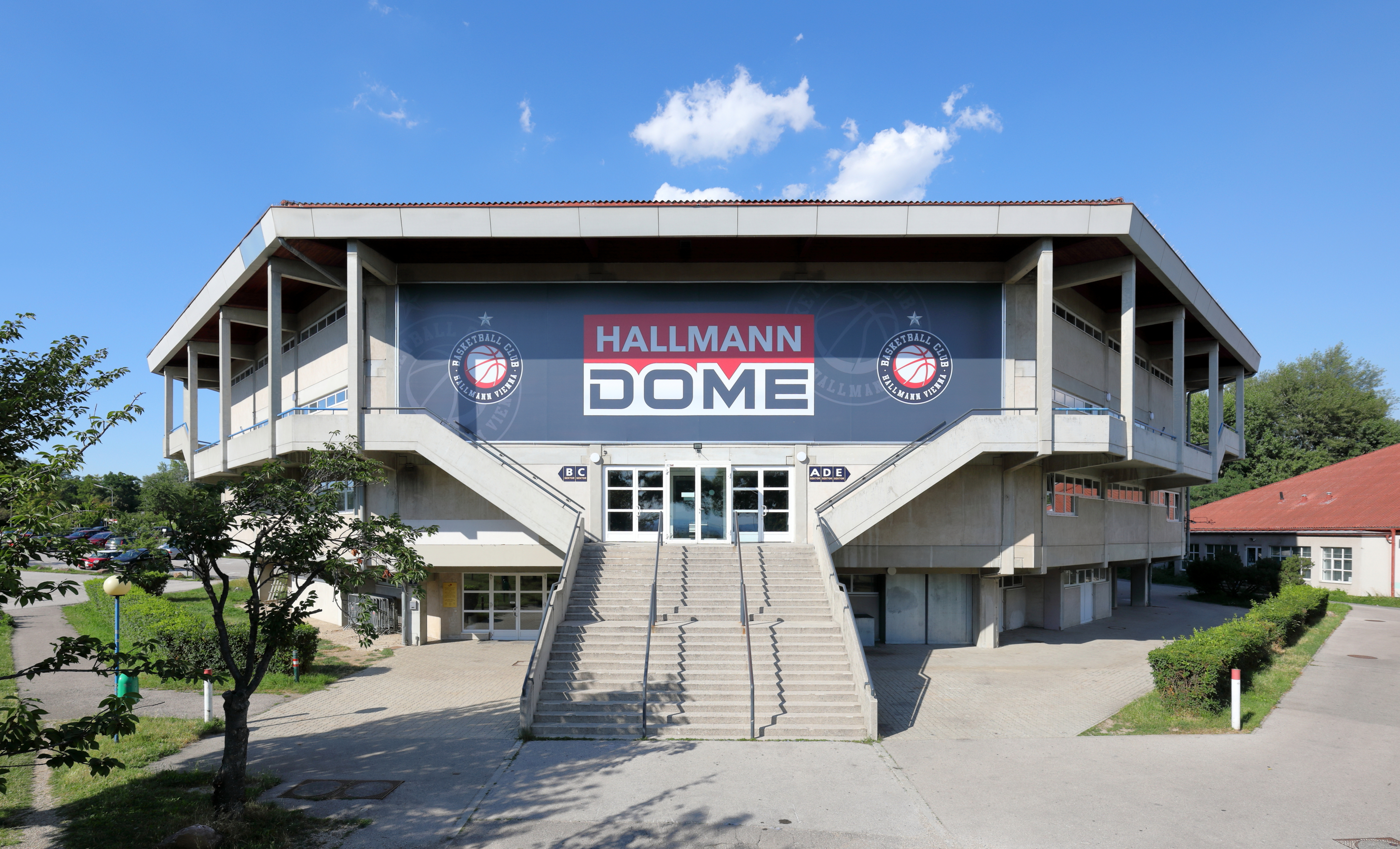
Home arena The Hallmann Dome

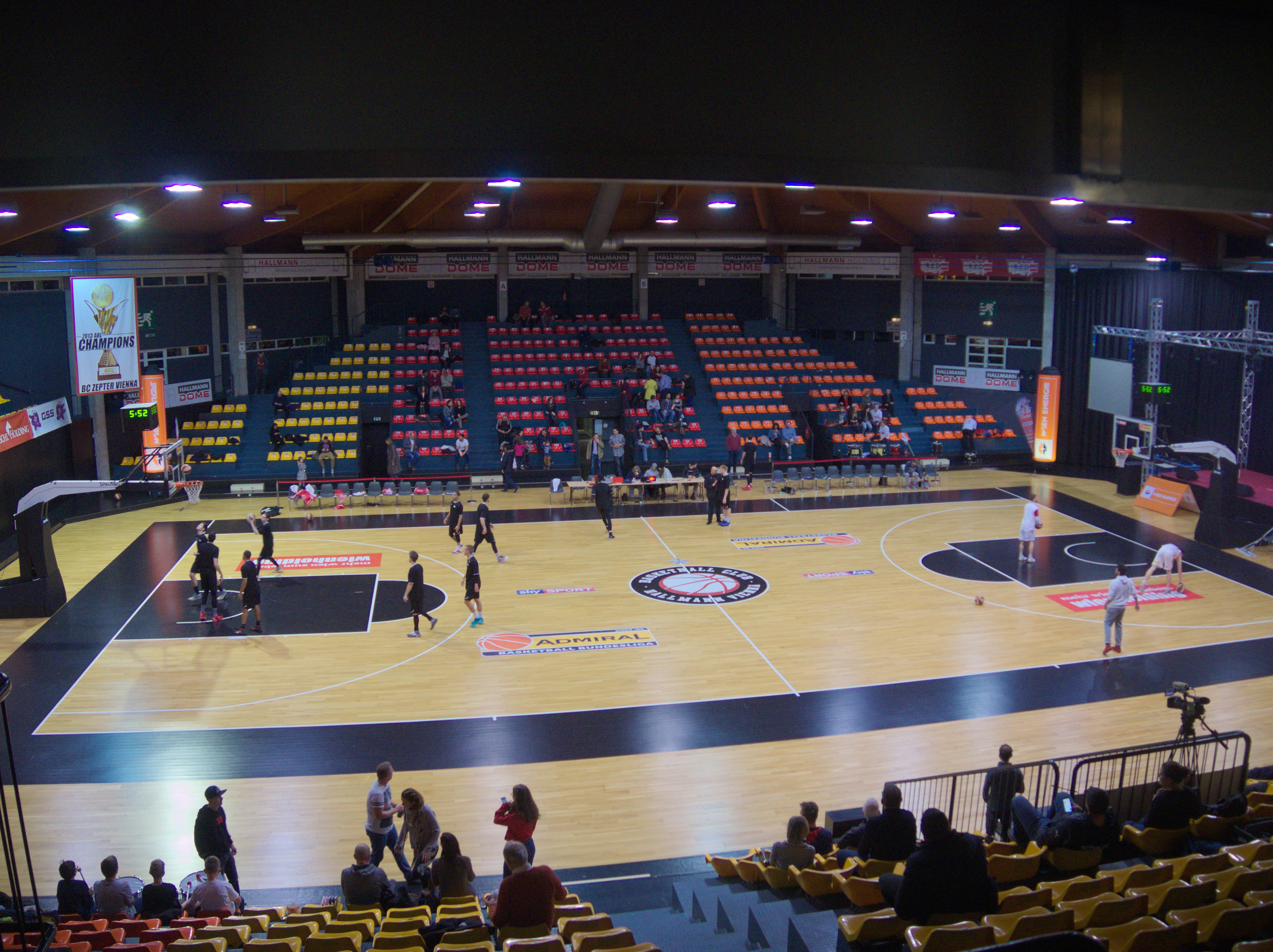
Interior view of the Hallmann Dome in 2018

Season	Domestic competitions				European competitions	
Season	Tier	League	Position	Austrian Cup	Competition	Result
2012–13	1	ABL	1st	Runner-up		
2013–14	1	ABL	3rd	Semifinalist	EuroChallenge	4th in Group C
2014–15	1	ABL	2nd	Semifinalist		
2015–16	1	ABL	4th	Runner-up		
2016–17	1	ABL	5th	Quarterfinalist		
2017–18	1	ABL	4th	Round of 16	Alpe Adria Cup	3rd in Group A
2018–19	1	ABL	7th	Quarterfinalist	Alpe Adria Cup	4th in Group D
2019–20	1	BSL	(7th)	Round of 16	Alpe Adria Cup	Semifinalist
2020–21	1	BSL	7th	Semifinalist	Europe Cup	First qualifying round
2021–22	1	BSL	1st	Champion	Alpe Adria Cup	Semifinalist
2022–23	1	BSL	2nd	Semifinalist	Alpe Adria Cup	Runner-up
2023–24	1	BSL	9th	Quarterfinalist	Alpe Adria Cup	4th in Group B
2024–25	1	BSL	9th	Round of 16		
2025–26	1	BSL	TBD	TBD	ABA League (D1)	TBD

== Players ==
=== Current roster ===
Note: Flags indicate national team eligibility at FIBA-sanctioned events. Players may hold other non-FIBA nationalities not displayed.

BC Vienna roster
Players	Coaches
Pos. / No. / Nat. / Name / Ht. / Wt. / Age	Head coach: Vacant; Legend: (C) Team captain; Injured

== Notable players ==
- (Austria) (Kosovo) Enis Murati
- (England) Ryan Richards
- (Israel) Anton Shoutvin
- (Montenegro) Žarko Rakočević
- (United States) Ian Boylan
- (United States) Andre Owens
- (United States) Richaud Pack
- (United States) Amin Stevens
- (United States) Souley Boum
