= Oberwart Gunners =

Professional basketball club in Oberwart, Austria

Unger Steel Oberwart Gunners
- Nickname: Gunners
- Leagues: Österreichische Basketball Bundesliga
- Founded: 1957; 69 years ago
- Arena: Sporthalle Oberwart
- Capacity: 2,500
- Location: Oberwart, Austria
- Team colors: Blue, White
- Main sponsor: Unger Steel Group
- President: Thomas Linzer
- Team manager: Martin Pröll
- Head coach: Horst Leitner
- Championships: 2 Austrian Championship; 5 Austrian Cups
- Website: www.gunners.at
Home	Away

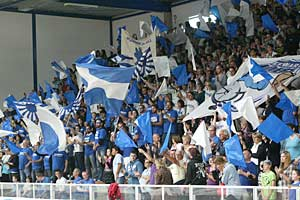
Fans of the Oberwart Gunners

Oberwart Gunners, for sponsorship reasons known as Unger Steel Gunners Oberwart, is a professional basketball club based in Oberwart, Austria. The team plays in the Österreichische Basketball Bundesliga and was founded in 1957. The team has won the Austrian championship four times, in 2011, 2016, 2024 and 2025.

== Trophies ==
- Österreichische Basketball Bundesliga
  - Winners (4): 2011, 2016, 2024, 2025
    - Runner-up (6): 1997, 1998, 2005, 2007, 2008, 2013
- Austrian Cups
  - Winners (5): 1995, 1999, 2005, 2016, 2021

== Sponsorship names ==
Due to sponsorship reasons, the club has been known as:

- Macabido Gunners (2004–2007)
- Redwell Oberwart Gunners (2012–2017)
- Unger Steel Oberwart Gunners (2018-present)

== Season by season ==
Season	Tier	League	Pos.	Austrian Cup	European competitions	
2010–11	1	ÖBL	1st	Champion		
2011–12	1	ÖBL	5th			
2012–13	1	ÖBL	2nd	Runner-up		
2013–14	1	ÖBL	7th			
2014–15	1	ÖBL	7th			
2015–16	1	ÖBL	1st	Champion		
2016–17	1	ÖBL	2nd	Runner-up	4 FIBA Europe Cup	RS
2017–18	1	ÖBL	7th	Round of 16		
2018–19	1	ÖBL	3rd	Semifinalist		

== Players ==
=== Notable players ===
Note: Flags indicate national team eligibility at FIBA-sanctioned events. Players may hold other non-FIBA nationalities not displayed.

Criteria

To appear in this section a player must have either:

- Set a club record or won an individual award while at the club
- Played at least one official international match for their national team at any time
- Played at least one official NBA match at any time.

- (England) Ray Carter
- (Lithuania) Adomas Drungilas
- (United States) Seamus Boxley
- (United States) Darnell Hinson
- (United States) J.J. Mann
- (United States) Chris McNeally
