= UBC Güssing Knights =

Güssing Knights
- Leagues: Landesliga
- Founded: 1957; 68 years ago
- History: UBC Güssing Knights (2004–present)
- Arena: Aktiv Park Güssing
- Capacity: 1,000
- Team colors: Black, White
- Main sponsor: Magnofit
- Championships: 2 Austrian Championships; 1 Austrian Cup
- Website: guessing-knights.at
Home	Away

UBC Magnofit Güssing Knights is a professional basketball club based in Güssing, Austria. The team played in the Austrian ÖBL, but in April 2016 the team was disqualified from the league.

== History ==
In the 2013–14 season, the Knights shocked Austria by taking the national title by beating top seeded ece Bulls Kapfenberg 3–2 in the Finals. They turned around a 0–2 deficit to the Bulls. Before the season the Knight were predicted to end on the 7th place by surveys around the league. The following season, the Knights would make their debut in Europe. The team entered the 2014–15 EuroChallenge regular season.

After another national title in 2015, things were looking bright for Knights. However, in the 2015–16 season the team had financial problems. This eventually resulted in the licence of the club being taken by the ÖBL, and the team was disqualified from the ÖBL season in April 2016.

== Sponsorship names ==
- Until 2004: UBBC Guttomat Güssing
- 2004–2008: Güssing Knights
- 2008–2012: UBC ökoStadt Güssing Knights
- 2012–2016: UBC Magnofit Güssing Knights

== Honours ==
- Austrian Championship (2):

2013–14, 2014–15

- Austrian Cup (1):

2015

== Season by season ==
Season	Tier	League	Pos.	Austrian Cup	European competitions	
2007–08	1	ÖBL	9th	Semifinalist		
2008–09	1	ÖBL	9th			
2009–10	1	ÖBL	9th			
2010–11	1	ÖBL	11th			
2011–12	1	ÖBL	6th	Semifinalist		
2012–13	1	ÖBL	7th			
2013–14	1	ÖBL	1st			
2014–15	1	ÖBL	1st	Winner	3 EuroChallenge	L16
