= ÖBL All-Star Game =

OBL All-Star Game
- Status: Inactive
- Inaugurated: 1995
- Most recent: 2019
- Organizer: OBL

The ÖBL All-Star Game (also known as Admiral Basketball League (ABL) All-Star Game) is a yearly event held by the Österreichische Basketball Bundesliga. It yearly matches the league's star players from Europe against their counterparts from the world. It is the featured event of ÖBL All-Star Day. The All-Star game was first staged at the FZZ Happyland in Klosterneuburg in 1995.

== Results ==
Year	Venue	City	Team	Score	Team	MVP
1995	FZZ Happyland Klosterneuburg	Klosterneuburg	Austrians	114–123	US All-Stars	
1996	SH Lichtenegg Wels	Wels	Austrians	86–109	All-Stars	
1997	Sporthalle Baden	Baden bei Wien	Austrians	89–93	Legionnaires	
1998	Sporthalle Baden	Baden bei Wien	Austrian All-Stars	113–117	All-Stars	
1999	Sporthalle Oberwart	Oberwart	Austrian-Euro-Stars	138–143	All-Stars	
2000	Sporthalle Oberwart	Oberwart	Austrian-Euro-Stars	123–150	All-Stars	
2001	Sporthalle Oberwart	Oberwart	Euro-Stars	118–132	All-Stars	
2002	Not held					
2003	Lions Dome Traiskirchen	Traiskirchen	North	151–136	South	(United States) Mike Wallace (Mattersburg 49ers)
2004	Kraftwerk Arena Wels	Wels	North	124–122	South	(United States) Rod Platt (WBC)
2005	Lions Dome Traiskirchen	Traiskirchen	North	138–153	South	(United States) Jonathan Levy (Panthers)
2006	FZZ Happyland	Klosterneuburg	Austrians	130–137	Internationals	(United States) Aaron Mitchell (Mattersburg 49ers)
2007	SH Alpenstraße	Salzburg	Austrians	130–137	Internationals	(United States) Jimmy Boston (Mattersburg 49ers)
2008	FZZ Happyland	Klosterneuburg	Austrians	98–124	Internationals	(Canada) Michael Fraser (Panthers)
2009	Wiener Stadthalle	Vienna	Euro-Stars	144–149	All-Stars	(United States) Brandon Thomas (WBC)
2010	Wiener Stadthalle	Vienna	Austrians	78–88	Internationals	(United States) Terrence Roderick (Lions)
2011	Wiener Stadthalle	Vienna	Austrians	111–90	Internationals	(Austria) Stjepan Stazić (Panthers)
2012	Wiener Stadthalle	Vienna	Austrians	103–105	Internationals	(United States) Anthony Shavies (Panthers)
2013	Raiffeisen Arena	Wels	Europeans	106–110	Internationals	(United States) Mike Dale (UBSC)
2014	Stadthalle Graz	Graz	Europeans	90–96	Internationals	(United States) Travis Taylor
2015	Multiversum Schwechat	Schwechat	Austrians	138–133	Internationals	(Germany) Tilo Klette
2016	Lions Dome Traiskirchen	Traiskirchen	Austrians	87–106	Internationals	(United States) Dane Watts
2017	Lions Dome Traiskirchen	Traiskirchen	Austrians	106–99	Internationals	(Bosnia and Herzegovina) (Austria) Davor Lamešić
2018	Lions Dome Traiskirchen	Traiskirchen	Austrians	101–100	Internationals	(Austria) Stjepan Stazic
2019	Lions Dome Traiskirchen	Traiskirchen	Austrians	79–87	Internationals	(United States) Hayden Lescault
2020-2022	Not held due to COVID-19					

== Slam-Dunk champions ==
Year	Winner	Team
1997	(United States) Craig Thames	Mattersburg 49ers
1998	(United States) Terry McCord	Gunners
1999	(United States) (Austria) Sean Allen	Kapfenberg Bulls
2000	(United States) (Austria) Sean McCaw	Traiskirchen Lions
2001	(United States) Gregory Stephens	BSC Fürstenfeld Panthers
2003	(United States) Jeff Paris	Swans
2004	(United States) Jerome Robinson	Gunners
2005	(United States) Elijah Palmer	Traiskirchen Lions
2006	(United States) Tobe Carberry	Wörthersee Piraten
2007	(United States) Maurice Hargrow	WBC
2008	(United States) Rashard Sullivan	Swans
2009	(United States) Marquis Wright	Dukes
2010	(United States) Terrence Roderick	Traiskirchen Lions
2011	(United States) Larry Gordon	Kapfenberg Bulls
2012	(United States) Todd Brown	WBC
2013	(United States) Darnell Gant	Gunners
2014	(United States) Amin Stevens	Fürstenfeld Panthers
2015	(United States) Amin Stevens (2)	BC Vienna
2016	(United States) Chris Ferguson	Oberwart Gunners
2017	(United States) Cameron Naylor	UBSC Raiffeisen Graz
2018	(United States) Denzel Gregg	Oberwart Gunners
2019	(United States) Elijah Wilson	Kapfenberg Bulls

== Three-point shootout contest ==
Year	Winner	Team
1997	(United States) Mike Coffin	Kapfenberg Bulls
1998	(United States) Terry McCord	Gunners
1999	(United States) Mike Coffin	Kapfenberg Bulls
2000	(United States) Mike Coffin (3)	Kapfenberg Bulls
2001	(United States) Anthony Rutland	Gunners
2003	(Lithuania) Arnas Kazlauskas	WBC
2004	(Austria) Alexander Atterbigler	Lions
2005	(Czech Republic) Pavel Stanek	WBC
2006	(Austria) Christoph Nagler	Gunners
2007	(United States) Curtis Bobb	WBC
2008	(United States) Adam Boone	Gunners
2009	(United States) Brandon Thomas	WBC
2010	(United States) Bruce Fields	WBC
2011	(Austria) Stefan Ulreich	Mattersburg Rocks
2012	(United States) Ali Farokhmanesh	WBC
2013	(Austria) Romed Vieider	WBC
2014	(Austria) Romed Vieider (2)	WBC
2015	(Kosovo) (Austria) Enis Murati	Gmunden Swans
2016	(United States) Bobb Curtis	BK IMMOunited Dukes
2017	(United States) Bobb Curtis (3)	BK IMMOunited Dukes
2018	(Argentina) (Italy) Fabricio Vay	Traiskirchen Lions
2019	(United States) Marck Coffin	Kapfenberg Bulls

== Topscorers ==
Year	Player	Team
2007	(Austria) Stjepan Stazic (31 pts)	Traiskirchen Lions
2008	(Canada) Mike Fraser (24 pts)	BSC Fürstenfeld Panthers
2014	(Serbia) Nikola Pavlicevic (18 pts)	GGMT Vienna
2016	(United States) Dane Watts (24 pts)	Magnofit Güssing Knights
2017	(Bosnia and Herzegovina) (Austria) Davor Lamešić (21 pts)	WBC Raiffeisen Wels
2018	(Austria) Stjepan Stazic (18 pts)	BC Vienna
2019	(United States) Hayden Lescault (20 pts)	Upper Ward Gunners

== Sources ==
- All results
- MVP and contest winners
