= 2019–20 Austrian Basketball Superliga =

Basketball season

Austrian Basketball Superliga
- Season: 2019–20
- Teams: 10
- TV partner(s): Sky Sport; ORF+

The 2019–20 Austrian Basketball Superliga was the inaugural season of the Basketball Superliga, the newly established top-tier league in Austrian basketball. It was the 74th season of the first tier of basketball in Austria. The Kapfenberg Bulls entered the season as the defending national champions winning the 2018–19 ÖBL season.

The season was ended prematurely because of the COVID-19 pandemic.

== Format ==
Teams first play each other in the regular season home and away. After this, teams ranked 1–6 and 7-10 are divided in two groups to qualify for the playoffs. In the playoffs, the best eight teams play each other for the national championship in best-of-five series. The two lowest placed teams play against the top two teams of the Basketball Zweite Liga (B2L).

== Teams ==
=== Venues and locations ===
Location of teams in 2019–20 ÖBL

On 6 June 2019, eight licenses were confirmed. Raiffeisen Panthers Fürstenfeld and Vienna DC Timberwolves confirmed later they met the requirements.

On 6 August 2019, it was announced Panthers Fürstenfeld did not receive a licence while SKN St. Pölten entered the league.

Club	Place	Arena	Capacity
Flyers Wels	Wels	Raiffeisen Arena	1,700
Hallmann Vienna	Wien	Wiener Stadthalle B	1,000
Immounited Dukes	Klosterneuburg	Happyland Klosterneuburg	1,000
Kapfenberg Bulls	Kapfenberg	Sporthalle Walfersam	1,000
Oberwart Gunners	Oberwart	Sporthalle Oberwart	2,500
Raiffeisen Graz	Graz	Unionhalle	600
SKN St. Pölten	Sankt Pölten	Landessportzentrum St. Pölten	1,000
Swans Gmunden	Gmunden	Volksbank Arena	2,200
Traiskirchen Lions	Traiskirchen	Lions Dome	1,200
Vienna DC Timberwolves	Wien	T-Mobile Dome	1,000

=== Personnel and sponsorship ===
Club	Head coach	Kit manufacturer	Main sponsor
Flyers Wels	(Austria) Sebastian Waser		Raiffeisen
Hallmann Vienna	(Italy) Luigi Gresta		Hallmann
Immounited Dukes	(Austria) Werner Sallomon		
Kapfenberg Bulls	(Austria) Michael Coffin		
Oberwart Gunners	(Austria) Horst Leitner		Unger Steel
Raiffeisen Graz	(Slovenia) Ervin Dragsic		Raiffeisen
SKN St. Pölten	(Austria) Andreas Worenz		
Swans Gmunden	(Finland) Anton Mirolybov		
Traikirchen Lions	(Austria) Zoran Kostic		
Vienna DC Timberwolves	(Austria) Hubert Schmidt		

== Regular season ==
=== Standings ===
Pos	Team	Pld	W	L	PF	PA	PD	Pts	Qualification
1	Swans Gmunden	18	15	3	1643	1362	+281	30	Qualification to group 1–6
2	Immounited Dukes	18	14	4	1469	1304	+165	28	Qualification to group 1–6
3	Kapfenberg Bulls	18	13	5	1447	1310	+137	26	Qualification to group 1–6
4	Unger Steel Gunners Oberwart	18	13	5	1594	1396	+198	26	Qualification to group 1–6
5	SKN St. Pölten	18	11	7	1510	1476	+34	22	Qualification to group 1–6
6	Raiffeisen Flyers Wels	18	9	9	1434	1401	+33	18	Qualification to group 1–6
7	Hallmann Vienna	18	6	12	1523	1592	−69	12	Qualification to group 7–10
8	Raiffeisen Graz	18	4	14	1412	1539	−127	8	Qualification to group 7–10
9	Arkadia Traiskirchen Lions	18	3	15	1242	1557	−315	6	Qualification to group 7–10
10	Vienna DC Timberwolves	18	2	16	1300	1640	−340	4	Qualification to group 7–10

Source: Basketball Austria

=== Results ===
Home \ Away	TRA	VIE	KLO	KAP	WEL	STP	SWA	GRA	OBE	TIM
Arkadia Traiskirchen Lions	—	88–76	72–76	59–88	60–88	63–80	67–88	92–82	52–83	89–65
Hallmann Vienna	100–67	—	98–83	72–97	73–80	79–93	101–106	64–60	93–101	95–81
Immounited Dukes	87–51	89–69	—	70–60	76–66	82–80	87–94	92–84	74–81	85–60
Kapfenberg Bulls	75–65	94–73	66–58	—	79–74	91–73	87–80	88–74	87–80	94–80
Raiffeisen Flyers Wels	93–83	76–84	58–73	67–58	—	87–88	72–106	85–69	101–91	84–67
SKN St. Pölten	84–69	101–92	86–106	89–69	75–71	—	74–85	95–72	68–107	73–64
Swans Gmunden	90–49	90–74	59–64	94–76	107–89	76–82	—	101–84	85–75	91–66
UBSC Raiffeisen Graz	107–73	83–77	79–84	78–85	67–87	75–98	81–107	—	75–87	88–72
Unger Steel Gunners Oberwart	112–67	103–98	68–76	63–62	84–73	83–71	85–90	87–73	—	112–61
Vienna DC Timberwolves	83–76	100–105	73–107	61–91	61–83	105–100	49–94	62–81	90–92	—

Source: Basketball Austria
Legend: Blue = home team win; Red = away team win.

== Second stage ==
=== Standings group 1–6 ===
Points from the first half of the season were divided by 2.

Pos	Team	Pld	W	L	PF	PA	PD	Pts	Qualification
1	Immounited Dukes	23	18	5	1917	1721	+196	22	Qualification to playoffs
2	Kapfenberg Bulls	23	17	6	1853	1703	+150	21	Qualification to playoffs
3	Swans Gmunden	23	17	6	2127	1810	+317	19	Qualification to playoffs
4	Unger Steel Gunners Oberwart	23	16	7	1999	1805	+194	19	Qualification to playoffs
5	SKN St. Pölten	23	12	11	1911	1928	−17	14	Qualification to playoffs
6	Raiffeisen Flyers Wels	23	10	13	1838	1830	+8	12	Qualification to playoffs

Updated to match(es) played on 8 March 2020. Source: Basketball Austria

=== Results group 1–6 ===
Home \ Away	KLO	KAP	WEL	STP	SWA	OBE
Immounited Dukes	—				91–83	91–83
Kapfenberg Bulls	92–89	—		90–73		
Raiffeisen Flyers Wels	86–88	71–77	—		92–85	
SKN St. Pölten	73–89		96–78	—		74–80
Swans Gmunden		104–77		115–85	—	
Unger Steel Gunners Oberwart		56–70	83–77		103–97	—

Updated to match(es) played on 8 March 2020. Source: Basketball Austria
Legend: Blue = home team win; Red = away team win.

=== Standings group 7–10 ===
Only matches from involved teams are counted in the table.

Pos	Team	Pld	W	L	PF	PA	PD	Pts	Qualification
1	Raiffeisen Graz	9	6	3	785	702	+83	12	Qualification to playoffs
2	Hallmann Vienna	9	6	3	784	733	+51	12	Qualification to playoffs
3	Arkadia Traiskirchen Lions	9	4	5	714	763	−49	8	Qualification to playoffs
4	Vienna DC Timberwolves	9	2	7	693	778	−85	4	Qualification to playoffs

Updated to match(es) played on 8 March 2020. Source: Basketball Austria

=== Results group 7–10 ===
Home \ Away	TRA	VIE	GRA	TIM
Arkadia Traiskirchen Lions	—		95–93	65–68
Hallmann Vienna	89–69	—	91–99	
Raiffeisen Graz		92–76	—	
Vienna DC Timberwolves		86–87		—

Updated to match(es) played on 8 March 2020. Source: Basketball Austria
Legend: Blue = home team win; Red = away team win.

== Austrian clubs in European competitions ==
Team	Competition	Progress
ece Bulls Kapfenberg	Champions League	First qualifying round
ece Bulls Kapfenberg	FIBA Europe Cup	Regular season

== Austrian clubs in international competitions ==
Team	Competition	Progress
Swans Gmunden	Alpe Adria Cup	Semifinal
Hallmann Vienna	Alpe Adria Cup	Semifinal
IMMOunited Dukes	Alpe Adria Cup	Regular season
UBSC Raiffeisen Graz	Alpe Adria Cup	Regular season
