= Jozo Rados =

Austrian basketball player

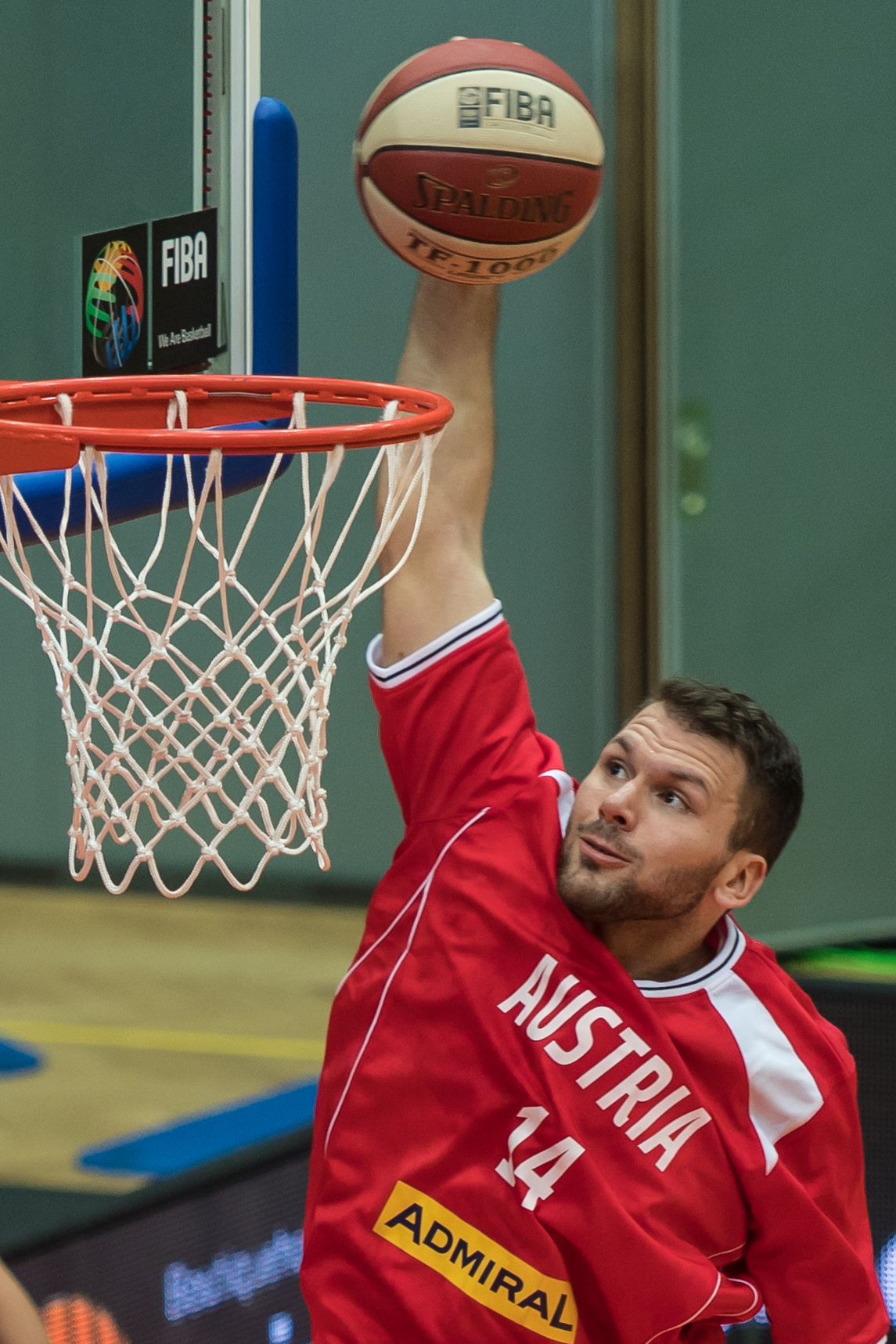
- Rados with Austria in August 2016

No. 31 – BC Vienna
- Position: Center
- League: Austrian Basketball Superliga

Personal information
- Born: 5 August 1993 (age 31); Mistelbach, Austria
- Listed height: 2.08 m (6 ft 10 in)
- Listed weight: 83 kg (183 lb)

Career information
- NBA draft: 2015: undrafted
- Playing career: 2010–present

Career history
- 2010–2013: Swans Gmunden
- 2013–2017: Klosterneuburg Dukes
- 2017–2018: Kapfenberg Bulls
- 2018–2019: Traiskirchen Lions
- 2019: Union Neuchâtel
- 2020–2021: Landstede Hammers
- 2021–present: Vienna

Career highlights and awards
- Austrian League champion (2018); 3× Austrian Cup champion (2011, 2012, 2018)

Jozo Rados (born 5 August 1993) is an Austrian basketball player for Vienna and Austria. Standing at 2.08 m (6 ft 10 in), he plays as center.

== Career ==
In 2010, Rados left his local team UKJ Mistelbach for the Swans Gmunden in the Austrian Basketball League.

In January 2013, Rados signed with Xion Dukes Klosterneuburg. He was named the Best Center of the Austrian League in the 2013–14 by Eurobasket.com.

In August 2017, Rados signed with Kapfenberg Bulls. In his first season with Kapfenberg, he won the double.

In the 2018 offseason, he signed with Traiskirchen Lions.

In the summer of 2019, Rados signed with his first foreign club when he signed with Union Neuchâtel in Switzerland.

In February 2020, Rados signed with Landstede Hammers in the Dutch Basketball League. On 25 July, Rados extended his contract with Hammers until 2021.

In June 2021, Rados returned to Austria when he signed with BC Vienna.

== Honours ==
Swans Gmunden

- 2× Austrian Cup: 2010–11, 2011–12

Kapfenberg Bulls

- Austrian Bundesliga: 2017–18
- Austrian Cup: 2017–18
