= Moritz Lanegger =

Austrian basketball player

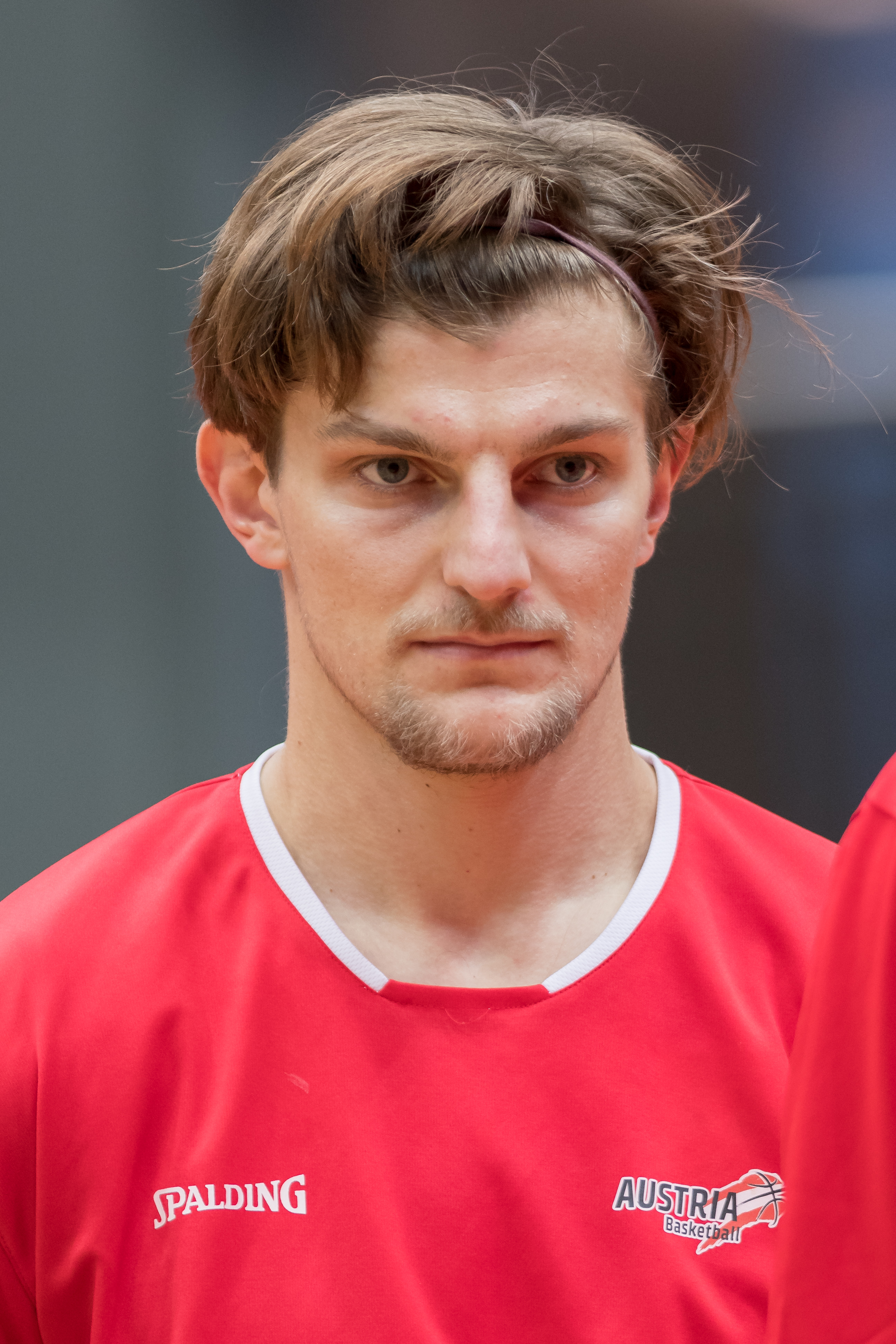
- Lanegger for Austria in 2014

Vienna DC Timberwolves
- Position: Point guard
- League: Austrian Basketball Superliga

Personal information
- Born: 29 March 1990 (age 34); Graz, Austria
- Listed height: 6 ft 3 in (1.91 m)
- Listed weight: 94 kg (207 lb)

Career information
- Playing career: 2006–present

Career history
- 2006–2011: Kapfenberg Bulls
- 2011–2015: Klosterneuburg Dukes
- 2015–2016: Güssing Knights
- 2016–2017: Team FOG Næstved
- 2017–2018: London Lions
- 2018: Bahía San Agustín
- 2018–2020: Klosterneuburg Dukes
- 2021–present: Vienna DC Timberwolves

Career highlights and awards
- ABL Austrian MVP (2013)

Moritz Lanegger (born 29 March 1990) is an Austrian professional basketball player for the Vienna DC Timberwolves of the Austrian Basketball Superliga. Lanegger is also a member of the Austrian national team. He plays the point guard position.

== Professional career ==
Lanegger started his career in 2006 with Kapfenberg Bulls. In 2011 he signed with Xion Dukes Klosterneuburg. In his second year there, he won his first Austrian championship. In August 2015, Lanegger signed with reigning Austrian champions Güssing Knights. On January 29, 2018, Lanegger signed with CB Bahía San Agustín out of Palma, Spain. He played for the Klosterneuburg Dukes from 2018 to 2020. On December 28, 2021, Lanegger signed with the Vienna DC Timberwolves.

== Honours ==
- Austrian Championship (1): 2012
- Austrian Cup (1): 2013
- Austrian Supercup (2): 2012, 2013
- Danish Cup (1): 2017

Individual awards:

- ABL Austrian MVP (1): 2013

== Austrian national team ==
Lanegger plays for the Austrian national team since 2011. He has also been a part of the country's 3x3 national team.
