= Aleksandar Đurić (basketball) =

Austrian basketball player

Personal information
- Born: 2 August 1982 (age 44) Bregenz, Austria
- Listed height: 2.10 m (6 ft 11 in)
- Listed weight: 113 kg (249 lb)

Career information
- NBA draft: 2004: undrafted
- Playing career: 1999–2013
- Position: Center / power forward
- Number: 12, 15, 17
- Coaching career: 2014–present

Career history

Playing
- 1999–2003: Kapfenberg Bulls
- 2003–2004: Crvena zvezda
- 2004–2005: Telekom Baskets Bonn
- 2005: Apollon Patras
- 2005–2008: Khimik
- 2008–2009: Politekhnika-Halychyna
- 2009–2010: Achilleas Kaimakli
- 2010–2012: Güssing Knights
- 2013: Fürstenfeld Panthers
- 2013: Vienna DC Timberwolves

Coaching
- 2014–2016: Traiskirchen Lions (assistant)

Aleksandar Đurić (Anglicized: Aleksandar Djuric; Serbian Cyrillic: Александар Ђурић; born 2 August 1982) is an Austrian professional basketball coach and former player.

== Playing career ==
A center, Đurić played 14 seasons in Austria and abroad from 1999 to 2013. During his playing days, he played for Kapfenberg Bulls, Crvena zvezda, Telekom Baskets Bonn, Apollon Patras, Khimik, Politekhnika-Halychyna, Achilleas Kaimakli, Güssing Knights, Fürstenfeld Panthers, and Vienna DC Timberwolves. He retired as a player with Vienna DC Timberwolves in 2013.

== National team career ==
Đurić was a member of the Austria national team at the FIBA EuroBasket 2013 qualification.

== Career achievements ==
- Austrian Bundesliga champion: 3 (with Kapfenberg Bulls: 2000–01, 2001–02, 2002–03)
- Austrian SuperCup winner: 2 (with Kapfenberg Bulls: 2002, 2003)
- Serbian-Montenegrin Cup winner: 1 (with Crvena zvezda: 2003–04)
