= Nemanja Krstić =

Serbian basketball player

No. 22 – Kapfenberg Bulls
- Position: Small forward / power forward
- League: Austrian Basketball Superliga

Personal information
- Born: March 2, 1993 (age 33) Kladovo, Serbia, FR Yugoslavia
- Listed height: 2.05 m (6 ft 9 in)
- Listed weight: 100 kg (220 lb)

Career information
- NBA draft: 2015: undrafted
- Playing career: 2011–present

Career history
- 2011–2012: Hemofarm
- 2012–2015: Mega Vizura / Leks
- 2015–2016: Igokea
- 2016: Mornar Bar
- 2017: Kapfenberg Bulls
- 2017–2018: Dynamic
- 2018–2019: Novi Pazar
- 2019–2020: Szolnoki Olaj
- 2020–present: Kapfenberg Bulls

Career highlights
- Austrian League champion (2017); Austrian Cup winner (2017); Bosnian League champion (2016); Bosnian Cup winner (2016); Serbian League Cup winner (2019); Basketball League of Serbia regular stage MVP (2018-2019); Serbian SuperLeague Top Scorer (2018-2019)
Medals
Men's basketball
Representing Serbia
U19 World Championship
Silver medal – second place	2011 Latvia	U19 National Team
U18 European Championship
Silver medal – second place	2011 Poland	U18 National Team
U16 European Championship
Bronze medal – third place	2009 Lithuania	U16 National Team

Nemanja Krstić (Serbian Cyrillic: Немања Крстић, born March 2, 1993) is a Serbian professional basketball player for Kapfenberg Bulls of the Austrian Basketball Superliga. He also represent the Serbian national basketball team in the international competitions. Standing at 6 ft 9 in (2.06 m), he can play either small forward or power forward positions.

== Professional career ==
He made his professional debut with KK Hemofarm during the 2011–12 season. In the summer of 2012, he signed with Mega Vizura. In July 2015, he left Mega and signed with KK Igokea.

On July 26, 2016, Krstić signed a one-year deal with Mornar Bar. On December 9, 2016, he parted ways with Mornar after averaging 3.6 points and 1.5 rebounds per game in ten ABA League games. On February 7, 2017, Krstić signed with Kapfenberg Bulls for the rest of the 2016–17 ÖBL season.

On August 17, 2017, Krstić signed with Dynamic. In 40 games of the Serbian League with Dynamic, he averaged 15.5 points and 5.6 rebounds per game.

On September 6, 2018, Krstić signed with Novi Pazar. In 36 games of the Serbian League, he averaged 18.6 points, 6 rebounds and 2.6 assists per game. He was the best player in regular stage of Basketball League of Serbia. With average 20.3 points, he was Serbian SuperLeague Top Scorer.

On August 9, 2019, Krstić signed with the Hungarian team Szolnoki Olaj KK. He averaged 8.4 points and 3.2 rebounds per game. On August 21, 2020, Krstić rejoined the Kapfenberg Bulls in Austria.

== National team career ==
Krstić was a member of the Serbian national basketball team at the EuroBasket 2013.

== See also ==
- List of Serbia men's national basketball team players
