= Martin Kohlmaier =

Austrian basketball player

No. 11 – ece Bulls Kapfenberg
- Position: Center

Personal information
- Born: 30 May 1984 (age 40); Villach, Austria
- Listed height: 7 ft 2 in (2.18 m)

Career information
- Playing career: 2002–present

Career history
- 2002–2006: Kapfenberg Bulls
- 2006–2007: Huelva
- 2007: Tarragona
- 2007–2008: UBC St. Pölten
- 2008–2009: UB La Palma
- 2009–2010: LTi Gießen 46ers
- 2010–present: Kapfenberg Bulls

Martin Kohlmaier (born 30 May 1984) is an Austrian basketball player. He currently plays for the Kapfenberg Bulls and the Austria national basketball team.

== Honours ==
- 2x Austrian League (2003, 2004)
- Austrian Cup (2014)
- 2x Austrian Supercup (2002, 2003)

Individual awards

- ÖBL Austrian MVP (2014)
