= Giorgi Bezhanishvili =

Austrian–Georgian basketball player

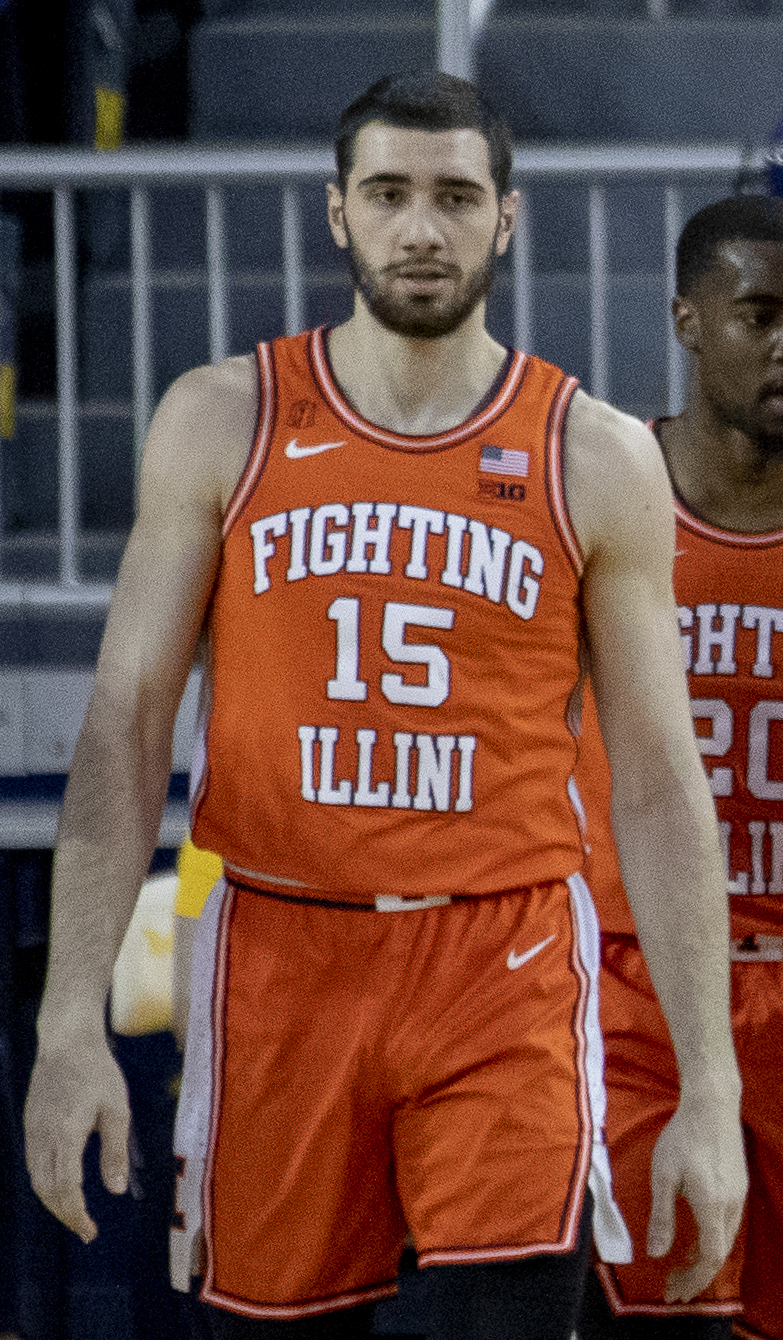
- Bezhanishvili with Illinois in 2021

No. 35 – College Park Skyhawks
- Position: Power forward
- League: NBA G League

Personal information
- Born: 16 November 1998 (age 27) Rustavi, Georgia
- Listed height: 6 ft 9 in (2.06 m)
- Listed weight: 245 lb (111 kg)

Career information
- High school: The Patrick School (Hillside, New Jersey)
- College: Illinois (2018–2021)
- NBA draft: 2021: undrafted
- Playing career: 2014–present

Career history
- 2014–2016: Basket Flames
- 2016–2017: Klosterneuburg Dukes
- 2021–2022: Grand Rapids Gold
- 2022: Guelph Nighthawks
- 2022–2023: College Park Skyhawks
- 2023: Vancouver Bandits
- 2023–2024: Formosa Dreamers
- 2024: Iowa Wolves
- 2024–2025: Gravelines-Dunkerque
- 2025: Covirán Granada
- 2025: AEK Larnaca
- 2025–2026: Windy City Bulls
- 2026: Satria Muda Bandung
- 2026–present: College Park Skyhawks
- Stats at NBA.com
- Stats at Basketball Reference

Giorgi Bezhanishvili (born 16 November 1998) is an Austrian-Georgian professional basketball player for the College Park Skyhawks of the NBA G League. He played college basketball for the Illinois Fighting Illini.

== Early life ==
Bezhanishvili was born in Rustavi, Georgia on 16 November 1998. In 2002, Bezhanishvili's mother Lali emigrated to Vienna, Austria by way of Prague, Czech Republic in search of work due to economic hardships in Georgia that resulted from the dissolution of the Soviet Union. As a result, when Bezhanishvili was 3 he and his older brother Davit moved in with their grandparents. As a child, Bezhanishvili's hobbies included basketball and dancing. At the age of 10, he placed second in classical dance in a national competition. When he was 14, Bezhanishvili moved to Vienna to be with his mother. In 2016, Bezhanishvili became a naturalized citizen of Austria. Bezhanishvili has learned to speak English, Georgian, German, and Russian.

== Youth career ==
After moving to Vienna, Bezhanishvili played in the youth system for the Basket Flames. From 2014 to 2016 he played for the men's senior Basket Flames team that competes in the 2. Österreichische Basketball Bundesliga which is the second tier of basketball in Austria. During the 2016–2017 season, Bezhanishvili played for the Klosterneuburg Dukes of the Austrian Basketball League and was teammates with former Lehigh player Michael Ojo. Ojo got Bezhanishvili connected with American basketball coaches which resulted in a scholarship to attend The Patrick School in Elizabeth, New Jersey. With Klosterneuburg, Bezhanishvili averaged 6.2 points, 2.6 rebounds and 1.4 assists.

=== Recruiting ===
During his senior year of high school at The Patrick School, Bezhanishvili received a scholarship offer from the University of Illinois and committed to play college basketball for head coach Brad Underwood after his official visit on 26 March 2018. Bezhanishvili also had considered scholarship offers from Minnesota, Seton Hall, and St. Bonaventure.

College recruiting
Name	Hometown	School	Height	Weight	Commit date
Giorgi Bezhanishvili; PF	Rustavi, Georgia	The Patrick School (NJ)	6 ft 9 in (2.06 m)	230 lb (100 kg)	Mar 26, 2018
Giorgi Bezhanishvili; PF	Recruit ratings: Rivals: 247Sports: ESPN: (74)				
Overall recruit ranking:
Note: In many cases, Scout, Rivals, 247Sports, On3, and ESPN may conflict in their listings of height and weight.; In these cases, the average was taken. ESPN grades are on a 100-point scale.; Sources: "Illinois 2018 Basketball Commitments". Rivals.; "2018 Illinois Fighting Illini Recruiting Class". ESPN.; "2018 Team Ranking". Rivals.

== College career ==
As a freshman, Bezhanishvili averaged 12.5 points on 54.2 percent shooting while averaging 5.2 rebounds per game. He set Illinois' freshman scoring record with 35 points against Rutgers. Bezhanishvili went through a slump midway through his sophomore season in which he shot 27 percent over nine games and came off the bench behind Kofi Cockburn. He averaged 6.8 points and 4.8 rebounds per game as a sophomore. As a junior, he averaged 5.1 points and 2.7 rebounds per game. Following the season, Bezhanishvili declared for the 2021 NBA draft.

== Professional career ==
=== Grand Rapids Gold (2021–2022) ===
After going undrafted in the 2021 NBA draft, Bezhanishvili joined the Denver Nuggets for NBA Summer League play. On 13 September 2021, he signed an Exhibit 10 deal with the Nuggets. Bezhanishvili joined the Grand Rapids Gold as an affiliate player.

=== College Park Skyhawks (2022–2023) ===
On 25 August 2022, Bezhanishvili was traded to the College Park Skyhawks.

=== Vancouver Bandits (2023) ===
On 28 March 2023, Bezhanishvili signed with the Vancouver Bandits of the Canadian Elite Basketball League.

=== Formosa Dreamers (2023–2024) ===
On 30 August 2023, Bezhanishvili signed with the Formosa Dreamers of the P. League+.

On 2 January 2024, Formosa Dreamers terminated contract with Bezhanishvili.

=== Iowa Wolves (2024) ===
On 10 January 2024, Bezhanishvili joined the Iowa Wolves of the NBA G League, but was waived on 9 February. On 22 February, he rejoined the Wolves.

=== BCM Gravelines-Dunkerque (2024–2025) ===
On 5 September 2024, Bezhanishvili signed with BCM Gravelines-Dunkerque of the LNB Élite.

=== Covirán Granada (2025) ===
On 9 March 2025, Bezhanishvili signed with Covirán Granada of the Liga ACB.

=== Windy City Bulls (2025-2026) ===
Bezhanishvili played the 2025–2026 season with the Windy City Bulls, the NBA G-League affiliate of the Chicago Bulls. He played in all 36 games, starting 29 of them, and finishing the season playing an average of 31.1 minutes, 13.8 points, and 7.3 rebounds per game.

== Career statistics ==
Legend
GP	Games played	GS	Games started	MPG	Minutes per game
FG%	Field goal percentage	3P%	3-point field goal percentage	FT%	Free throw percentage
RPG	Rebounds per game	APG	Assists per game	SPG	Steals per game
BPG	Blocks per game	PPG	Points per game	**Bold**	Career high

=== College ===
Year	Team	GP	GS	MPG	FG%	3P%	FT%	RPG	APG	SPG	BPG	PPG
2018–19	Illinois	**33**	**33**	**26.1**	.542	.167	**.657**	**5.2**	.8	**.7**	**.8**	**12.5**
2019–20	Illinois	31	24	23.2	.429	.306	.596	4.8	**1.6**	.1	.4	6.8
2020–21	Illinois	31	0	14.5	**.545**	**.500**	.629	2.7	.4	.2	.3	5.1
Career		95	57	21.4	.507	.264	.636	4.3	.9	.3	.5	8.2
