= 2024–25 Austrian Women's Basketball Bundesliga =

Women's basketball league in Austria

Austrian Women's Basketball Bundesliga
- Season: 2024–25
- Dates: Regular season: 28 September 2024 – 2 March 2025; Play Offs: 15 March – 17 April 2025
- Games played: 49
- Teams: 7

Regular season
- Season MVP: (United States) Alexia Allesch

Finals
- Champions: Klosterneuburg Duchess (4th title)
- Runners-up: UBI Graz
- Finals MVP: (United States) Alexia Allesch

Statistical leaders
Points	(Austria) Simone Sill	18.0
Rebounds	(Austria) Ajla Meskic	11.1
Assists	(Austria) Rebekka Kalaydjiev	5.7
Steals	(Austria) Clara Kronfuss	3.2
Blocks	(Montenegro) Agatija Vukicevic	1.5

The 2024–25 Austrian Women's Basketball Bundesliga is the 76th season of the top division women's basketball league in Austria since its establishment in 1948. It starts in September 2024 with the first round of the regular season and ends in April 2025.

SKN St. Pölten are the defending champions but didn't participate this season.

Klosterneuburg Duchess won their fourth title after beating UBI Graz in the final.

== Format ==
Each team plays each other twice. The top four teams qualify for the play offs. The semifinals are played as a best of three series while the final is played as a best of five series.

== Regular season ==
Pos	Team	Pld	W	L	PF	PA	PD	Pts	Qualification
1	UBI Graz	12	11	1	942	653	+289	23	Play Offs
2	Klosterneuburg Duchess	12	10	2	897	683	+214	22	Play Offs
3	DBB Wels	12	7	5	826	777	+49	19	Play Offs
4	UBSC-DBBC Graz	12	6	6	716	768	−52	18	Play Offs
5	Basket Flames	12	5	7	767	752	+15	17	
6	Vienna D.C. Timberwolves	12	3	9	654	864	−210	15	
7	Vienna United	12	0	12	631	936	−305	12	

Source: BDSL
Rules for classification: 1) Points; 2) Points difference; 3) Points scored.

== Play offs ==
Semifinals	Final
1	UBI Graz	67	63	2
4	UBSC-DBBC Graz	46	44	0
1	UBI Graz	59	42	59	0
2	Klosterneuburg Duchess	94	84	83	3
2	Klosterneuburg Duchess	84	86	2
3	DBB Wels	58	54	0

Champions of Austria

Klosterneuburg Duchess
Fourth title
