= Philip Jalalpoor =

German basketball player (born 1993)

Personal information
- Born: 14 June 1993 (age 33) Schifferstadt, Germany
- Listed height: 1.88 m (6 ft 2 in)

Career information
- High school: Toutle Lake (Toutle, WA)
- College: LCC (2013–14); Olds College (2014–15); UBC (2015–18)
- Playing career: 2018–2024
- Position: Point guard
- Coaching career: 2024–present

Career history

Playing
- 2018–2019: CB Clavijo
- 2019–2020: SKN St. Pölten
- 2020–2022: Medi Bayreuth
- 2022: Njarðvík
- 2022: KR
- 2022–2023: SKN St. Pölten
- 2023–2024: Medi Bayreuth

Coaching
- 2024–2025: UBC (assistant)
- 2025–present: UBC (interim)

Career highlights
- As player: Canada West All-Star (2018); Austrian Superliga assists leader (2020); Tokyo 2020 Summer Olympics

Philip Pujan Jalalpoor (born 14 June 1993) is a retired German-Iranian professional basketball player. He also played for Iran men's national basketball team at the 2020 Summer Olympics. Before turning professional, Jalalpoor concluded his college basketball career at the University of British Columbia (UBC).

== Professional career ==
Prior to Jalalpoor moving to Germany in 2020 to join Medi Bayreuth in the Basketball Bundesliga (BBL), he played professionally in Spain and Austria. In his season with SKN St. Pölten in the Austrian Bundesliga, he averaged 18.6 points, 6.4 rebounds, and led the league in assists with an average of 6.9 per game. In National play, he represented Iran in the 2020 Summer Olympics.

In August 2022, Jalapoor signed with Úrvalsdeild karla club Njarðvík in Iceland. He played one regular season game for the team before parting ways with the club on 13 October. Five days later, he signed a one-month injury-replacement contract with rival Úrvalsdeild club KR. In three games for KR, he averaged 8.7 points and 1.3 assists per game.

On 22 June 2023, he returned to Medi Bayreuth, then playing in the German ProA.

== Coaching career ==
Jalalpoor announced his retirement as a player at the end of the 2023-24 campaign. He accepted an offer to become an assistant coach at the University of British Columbia (UBC). When UBC's long-time head coach Kevin Hanson announced his resignation in May 2025, Jalalpoor was named interim head coach.
