= Kostas Oikonomopoulos =

Greek basketball player

Kostas Oikonomopoulos Κώστας Οικονομόπουλος
Free agent
- Position: Shooting guard / point guard

Personal information
- Born: September 23, 1996 (age 30) Maroussi, Athens, Greece
- Listed height: 6 ft 4.5 in (1.94 m)
- Listed weight: 185 lb (84 kg)

Career information
- Playing career: 2014–present

Career history
- 2014–2015: Panionios
- 2015–2016: Kolossos Rodou
- 2016–2018: Ethnikos Piraeus
- 2018–2019: Rethymno Cretan Kings
- 2019–2020: Charilaos Trikoupis
- 2020–2021: St. Pölten
- 2021: Tritonas
- 2021–2022: Klosterneuburg Dukes
- 2022: Kolossos Rodou

Career highlights
- Greek 2nd Division champion (2020)

Kostas Oikonomopoulos (alternate spelling: Ekonomopoulos) (Greek: Κώστας Οικονομόπουλος; born September 23, 1996) is a Greek professional basketball player who last played for Kolossos Rodou of the Greek Basket League. He is a 1.94 m (6'4 1/2") tall combo guard.

== Professional career ==
Oikonomopoulos began his club career with the Greek minor league club Milon, playing in the Greek 4th Division, in the 2012–13 season. In 2014, he moved to the Greek club Panionios. In 2015, he moved to the Greek club Kolossos Rodou.

On August 18, 2020, Oikonomopoulos joined St. Pölten in Austria. The following year, he returned to Greece, and joined Tritonas of the Greek 2nd Division. After one moth with the club, he left in order to return to Austria, for the Klosterneuburg Dukes. In May 2022, he returned to Kolossos for the rest of the season. In 3 games, he averaged 0.7 points and 0.7 steals in under 5 minutes per contest.

== National team career ==
With the junior national teams of Greece, Oikonomopoulos played at the 2012 FIBA Europe Under-16 Championship, the 2014 FIBA Europe Under-18 Championship, and the 2015 FIBA Europe Under-20 Championship.
