= ÖBL Most Valuable Austrian Player =

The Österreichische Basketball Bundesliga (ÖBL) Most Valuable Austrian Player is an award given to the best player in the Österreichische Basketball Bundesliga, the highest professional basketball league in Austria. The award goes to the best Austrian player in the league, and was first handed out in the 2003–04 season.

== Winner ==
Season	Player	Position	Team
2003–04	David Jandl	G	Oberwart Gunners
2004–05	David Jandl (2)	G	Oberwart Gunners (2)
2005–06	Davor Lamesic	PG	Arkadia Traiskirchen Lions
2006–07	Armin Woschank	PG	WBC Kraftwerk Wels
2007–08	Davor Lamesic (2)	PF	Arkadia Traiskirchen Lions (2)
2008–09	Christoph Nagler	SG	Xion Dukes Klosterneuburg
2009–10	Christoph Nagler (2)	SG	Xion Dukes Klosterneuburg (2)
2010–11	Bernd Volcic	C	Oberwart Gunners (3)
2011–12	Christoph Nagler (3)	SG	Xion Dukes Klosterneuburg (3)
2012–13	Thomas Klepeisz	PG	UBC Güssing Knights
2013–14	Martin Kohlmaier	C	ece Bulls Kapfenberg
2014–15	Thomas Klepeisz (2)	PG	UBC Güssing Knights

== Sources ==
- Individual awards at oebl.at
