= Vienna Timberwolves =

Professional basketball club in Wien, Austria

- Nickname: Wolves
- Leagues: Austrian Basketball Superliga
- Founded: 1957; 68 years ago
- Capacity: 1,000
- Location: Telekom Dome
- Team colors: Wien, Austria
- Main sponsor: Deutsche Telekom
- Head coach: Hubert Schmidt
- Championships: 3 Austrian Second League
- Website: dctimberwolves.at
Home	Away

The Vienna Timberwolves, formerly Vienna DC Timberwolves, are an Austrian basketball club based in Wien. Since the 2018–19 season, the Timberwolves play in the Austrian Basketball Superliga (BSL), the highest tier in Austrian basketball. The Timberwolves are three-times Austrian Second League winners.

The club was founded on 21 June 1957 as the basketball section of WAT Stadlau, which was established two years earlier. In 1972, the club separated from the WAT Stadlau Omnisport club and became WAT Donaustadt. The first president of the club was Ferdinand Stadelmayer. In the 2014–15 season, the Timberwolves won the 2.ÖBL but was not able to promote as it lost to UBSC Graz in the promotion playoffs. Jakob Pöltl played in the Wolves youth sections during his younger years, from 2009 to 2016.

== Trophies ==
Austrian Second League

- Winners (3): 2009–10, 2014–15, 2017-18

== Season by season ==
Key
Playoff berth
Promoted

Season	Tier	League	Regular season					Playoffs	Austrian Cup	Head coach
Season	Tier	League	Finish	Played	Wins	Losses	Win%	Playoffs	Austrian Cup	Head coach
Vienna DC Timberwolves
2017–18	2	2. ÖBL	1st				–	–		Hubert Schmidt
2018–19	1	ÖBL	8th	36	12	24	.333	Lost quarterfinals (Kapfenberg Bulls, 0–3)		Hubert Schmidt
2019–20	1	Superliga	10th (Note: The 2019–20 season was ended early due to the COVID-19 pandemic.)	18	2	16	.111	–		Hubert Schmidt
