= Davor Lamešić =

Bosnian-Austrian basketball player

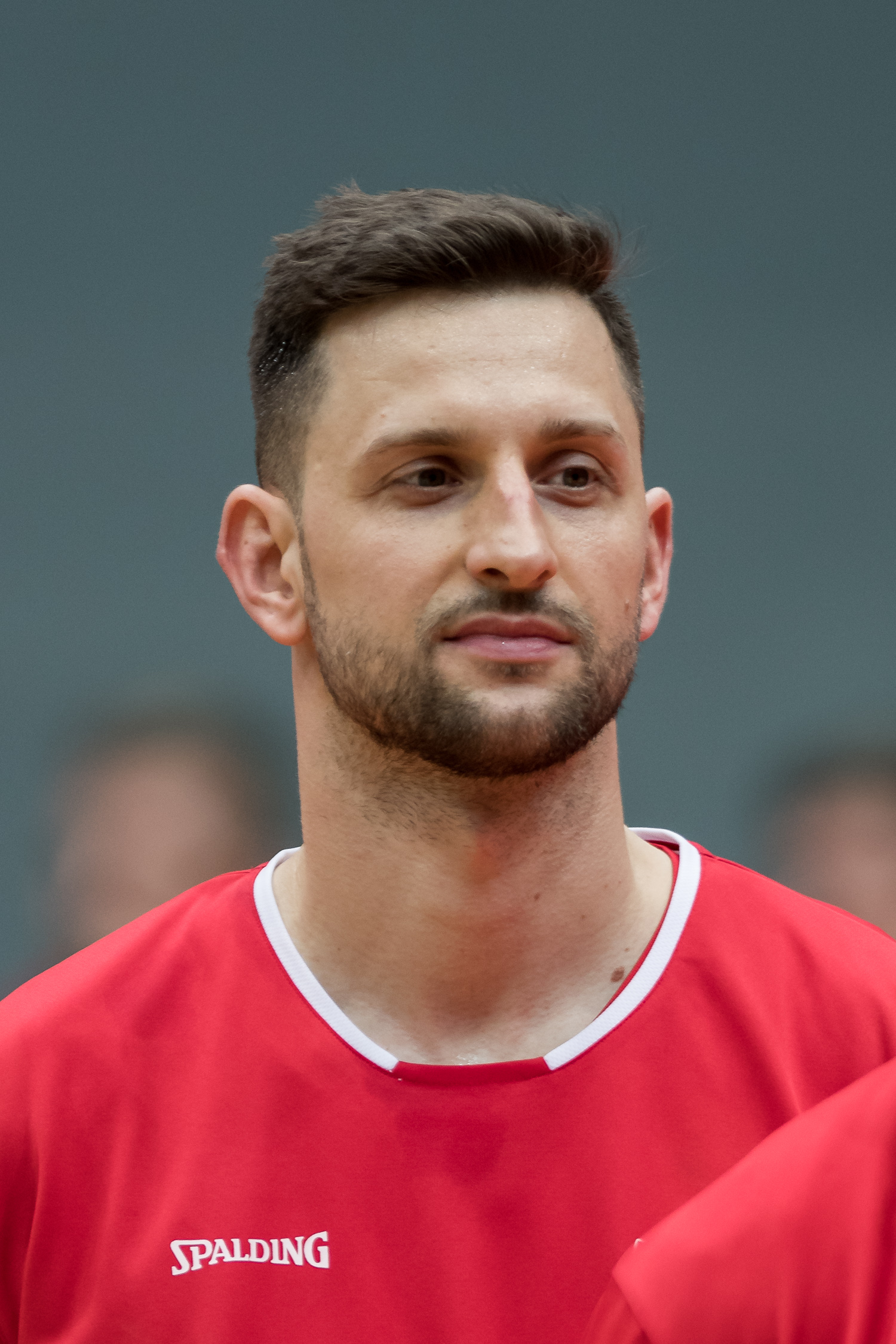

No. 7 – Raiffeisen Flyers Wels
- Position: Power forward
- League: Austrian Basketball Superliga

Personal information
- Born: October 24, 1983 (age 43) Brčko, SR Bosnia and Herzegovina, Yugoslavia
- Listed height: 6 ft 9 in (2.06 m)

Career information
- NBA draft: 2005: undrafted
- Playing career: 2004–present

Career history
- 2004–2008: Arkadia Traiskirchen Lions
- 2008: BG Göttingen
- 2008–present: WBC Raiffeisen Wels

Davor Lamešić (born October 24, 1983) is a Bosnian-Austrian professional basketball player for WBC Raiffeisen Wels since 2008. Lamesic has also often played for the Austrian national basketball team.

He started his career with Arkadia Traiskirchen Lions in 2004, in 2008 he played for BG Göttingen in Germany and then moved back to Austria to play for WBC Raiffeisen Wels.

== Honours ==
- Austrian Championship (1): 2009
- ABL Austrian MVP (3): 2006, 2008, 2017
- ABL All-Star (4): 2003, 2006, 2007, 2008
