= Johnathan Hudson =

American basketball player (born 1987)

KK Dubrava
- Position: Point guard
- League: HT Premijer liga

Personal information
- Born: May 4, 1987 (age 39) Sugar Land, Texas, U.S.
- Listed height: 5 ft 11 in (1.80 m)
- Listed weight: 161 lb (73 kg)

Career information
- High school: Stephen F. Austin (Sugar Land, Texas)
- College: Texas A&M (2006–2010)
- NBA draft: 2010: undrafted
- Playing career: 2012–present

Career history
- 2012: HKK Čapljina Lasta
- 2013: Suncoast Clippers
- 2013–2014: Diamond Basket Foggia
- 2014–2015: Zannella Basket Cefalu
- 2015–2016: Nelson Babylou Somma Lombardo
- 2016–2017: Naglis Palanga
- 2017: Dzukija Alytus
- 2017: London Lightning
- 2018: Blokotehna
- 2018: Trepça
- 2018: UBSC Raiffeisen Graz
- 2018–2019: BC Nokia
- 2019: Caen Basket Calvados
- 2019: Vllaznia
- 2019–2020: Dzukija Alytus
- 2020–2021: Äänekosken Huima
- 2021: ETHA Engomis
- 2021: Pont-de-Cheruy
- 2021–2022: ETHA Engomis
- 2022–2023: Eleftheroupoli Kavalas
- 2023: Al Ahli SC
- 2024–present: Dubrava

Johnathan Hudson (born May 4, 1987) is an American professional basketball player who last played for KK Dubrava of the HT Premijer liga. He attended Texas A&M (2006–2010).

== College career ==
Hudson attended Texas A&M from 2006 to 2010.

== Professional career ==
In 14 games for Dzukija Alytus he averaged 2.5 points and 1.6 assists.

On January 11, 2018, he signed with the Macedonian basketball club Blokotehna. He made his debut on January 21, 2018, scoring 3 points, one rebound and one assist in a 67–74 away win over the Pelister. On February 1, 2018, he left the club.

On season 2018/19 he signed a contract with UBSC Raiffeisen Graz that plays in ÖBL, the top men's professional basketball league in Austria. In December 2018 he moved to BC Nokia that plays in Korisliiga, the top men's professional basketball league in Finland.
