= Gary Ware =

American basketball player

Jennersdorf Blackbirds
- Position: Power forward / center
- League: Basketball Zweite Liga

Personal information
- Born: September 1, 1983 (age 43) Detroit, Michigan, U.S.
- Listed height: 6 ft 9 in (2.06 m)
- Listed weight: 244 lb (111 kg)

Career information
- College: Purdue
- Playing career: 2006–present

Career history
- 2006–2007: Aris Leeuwarden
- 2007–2008: ETHA Engomis
- 2008–2009: Debreceni Vadkakasok
- 2009–2010: Cherno More
- 2010–2011: Rabotnički
- 2011–2012: Raiffeisen Panthers
- 2012–2013: Liège Basket
- 2013: ASC Denain-Voltaire PH
- 2013–2014: Chin Min Dragons
- 2014–2016: Raiffeisen Panthers
- 2018–2021: Mattersburg Rocks
- 2021–present: Jennersdorf Blackbirds

Gary Ware (born September 1, 1983) is an American professional basketball player for Jennersdorf Blackbirds of the Basketball Zweite Liga.

He played for Raiffeisen Panthers from 2014 to 2016. Ware played for the Mattersburg Rocks of the Basketball Zweite Liga from 2018 to 2021. During the 2020–21 season, he averaged a league-leading 19.9 points per game as well as 8.2 rebounds and 1.6 assists per game. On September 30, 2021, Ware signed with Jennersdorf Blackbirds.
