= Benedikt Danek =

Austrian basketball player

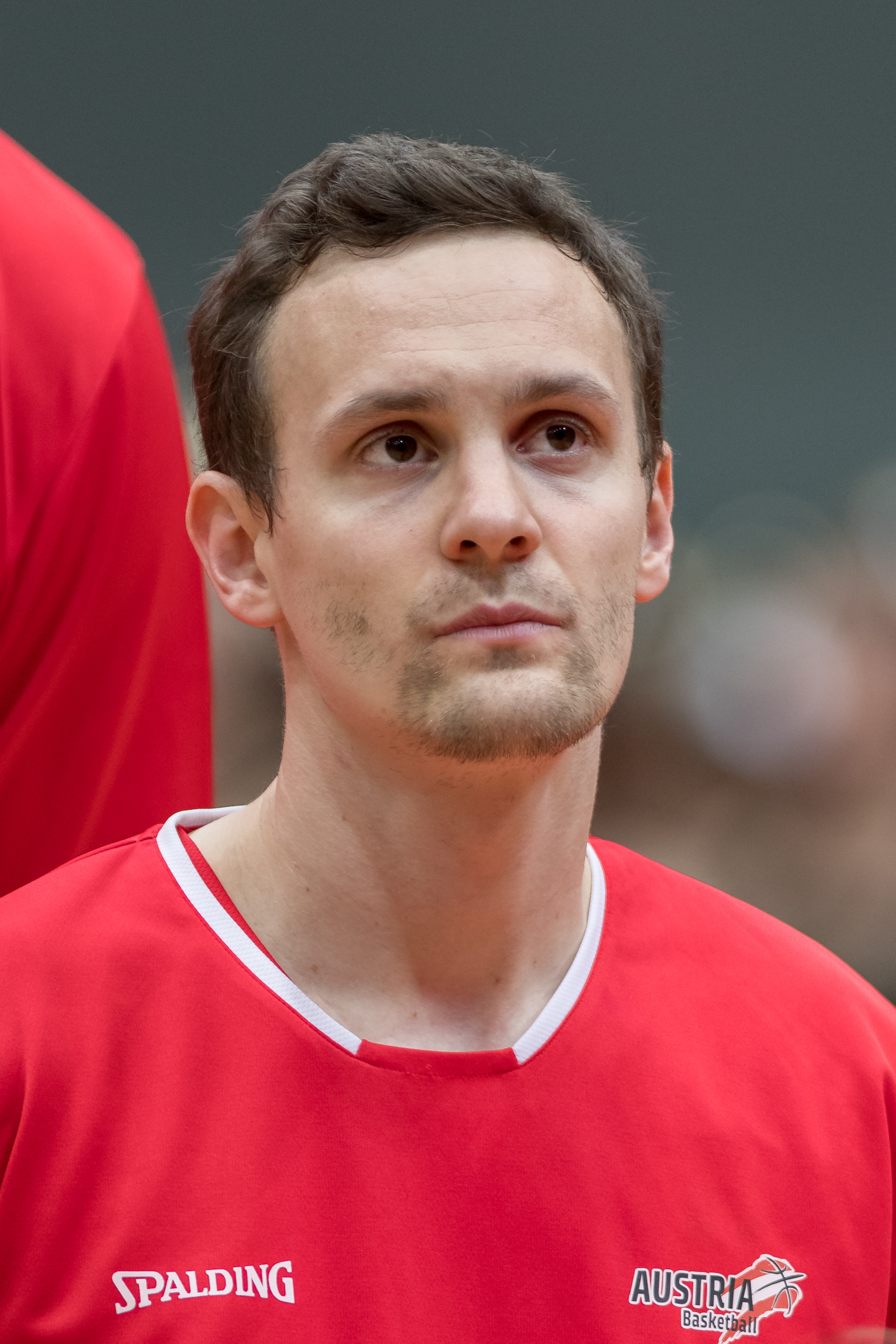
- Danek with Austria in 2019

No. 20 – Klosterneuburg Dukes
- Position: Point guard
- League: Austrian Basketball Superliga

Personal information
- Born: 24 August 1986 (age 40) Wien, Austria
- Listed height: 5 ft 9 in (1.75 m)

Career information
- Playing career: 1995–present

Career history
- 2004–2012: Traiskirchen Lions
- 2012–2014: Zepter Vienna
- 2014–2019: Traiskirchen Lions
- 2019–present: Klosterneuburg Dukes

Benedikt Danek (born 24 August 1986) is an Austrian professional basketball player for the Klosterneuburg Dukes of the Austrian Basketball Superliga.

He represented the Austria national team during the 2019 FIBA World Cup qualifiers.
