= 2022–23 Alpe Adria Cup =

Alpe Adria Cup
- Season: 2022–23
- Duration: 12 October 2022–16 March 2023
- Games played: 59
- Teams: 16

Finals
- Champions: (Poland) MKS Dąbrowa Górnicza (1st title)
- Runners-up: (Austria) GGMT Vienna
- Semifinalists: (Slovakia) BC Komárno (Slovakia) Spišski Rytieri

The 2022–23 Alpe Adria Cup was the seventh edition of the Alpe Adria Cup, an annual professional basketball competition. Teams from seven central european countries (Austria, Croatia, Czech Republic, Poland, Romania, Slovakia and Slovenia) competed this season.

== Teams ==
1st, 2nd, etc.: Place in the domestic competition

Regular season
(Croatia) Zabok (6th)	(Austria) GGMT Vienna (1st)	(Czech Republic) Geosan Kolín (5th)	(Slovakia) BC Komárno (3rd)
(Croatia) DepoLink Škrljevo (7th)	(Austria) Oberwart Gunners (3rd)	(Czech Republic) KVIS Pardubice (6th)	(Slovakia) Spišski Rytieri (4th)
(Croatia) Furnir (8th)	(Austria) Kapfenberg Bulls (6th)	(Czech Republic) Redstone Olomoucko (11th)	(Slovenia) Rogaška (4th)
(Croatia) Šibenka (9th)	(Poland) MKS Dąbrowa Górnicza (14th)	(Romania) OHMA Timișoara (6th)	(Slovenia) Nutrispoint Ilirija (5th)

== Regular season ==
=== Group A ===
Pos	Team	Pld	W	L	PF	PA	PD	Pts	Qualification	PAR	DAB	OBE	FUR
1	(Czech Republic) KVIS Pardubice	6	5	1	512	435	+77	11	Advance to quarterfinals	—	69–78	93–63	90–77
2	(Poland) MKS Dąbrowa Górnicza	6	4	2	462	435	+27	10	Advance to quarterfinals	68–79	—	89–74	87–77
3	(Austria) Oberwart Gunners	6	2	4	439	494	−55	8		76–85	74–71	—	85–76
4	(Croatia) Furnir	6	1	5	360	409	−49	7		73–96	62–69	71–67	—

Source: Alpe Adria Cup

=== Group B ===
Pos	Team	Pld	W	L	PF	PA	PD	Pts	Qualification	VIE	ŠIB	ILI	OLO
1	(Austria) GGMT Vienna	6	4	2	499	429	+70	10	Advance to quarterfinals	—	68–69	67–80	99–69
2	(Croatia) Šibenka	6	3	3	443	460	−17	9	Advance to quarterfinals	61–94	—	92–77	77–84
3	(Slovenia) Nutrispoint Ilirija	6	3	3	461	475	−14	9		69–81	67–85	—	90–81
4	(Czech Republic) Olomoucko	6	2	4	454	493	−39	8		81–90	70–59	69–78	—

Source: Alpe Adria Cup

=== Group C ===
Pos	Team	Pld	W	L	PF	PA	PD	Pts	Qualification	KOM	KOL	ŠKR	KAF
1	(Slovakia) BC Komárno	6	5	1	473	418	+55	11	Advance to quarterfinals	—	68–69	88–79	67–65
2	(Czech Republic) Geosan Kolín	6	5	1	472	441	+31	11	Advance to quarterfinals	79–91	—	66–65	91–68
3	(Croatia) DepoLink Škrljevo	6	1	5	454	477	−23	7		69–76	73–84	—	90–77
4	(Austria) Kapfenberg Bulls	6	1	5	429	492	−63	7		57–83	76–83	86–78	—

Source: Alpe Adria Cup

=== Group D ===
Pos	Team	Pld	W	L	PF	PA	PD	Pts	Qualification	TIM	SPI	ROG	ZAB
1	(Romania) OHMA Timișoara	6	5	1	576	466	+110	11	Advance to quarterfinals	—	106–72	99–74	92–65
2	(Slovakia) Spišski Rytieri	6	4	2	518	523	−5	10	Advance to quarterfinals	95–88	—	81–93	86–81
3	(Slovenia) Rogaška	6	2	4	507	527	−20	8		97–103	75–96	—	106–62
4	(Croatia) Zabok	6	1	5	437	522	−85	7		63–88	80–88	86–62	—

Source: Alpe Adria Cup

== Playoffs ==
In the playoffs, teams played against each other over two legs on a home-and-away basis, except for the Final Four. In the playoffs draw, the group winners were seeded, and the runners-up were unseeded. The seeded teams were drawn against the unseeded teams, with the seeded teams hosting the second leg.

Quarterfinals
(Czech Republic) KVIS Pardubice	73	80	153
(Slovakia) Spišski Rytieri	59	97	156
(Czech Republic) Geosan Kolín	74	81	155
(Austria) GGMT Vienna	72	93	165
(Croatia) Šibenka	78	78	156
(Slovakia) BC Komárno	71	89	160
(Poland) MKS Dąbrowa Górnicza	93	63	156
(Romania) OHMA Timișoara	86	64	150

Semifinals
(Slovakia) Spišski Rytieri	80
(Austria) GGMT Vienna	93
(Slovakia) BC Komárno	70
(Poland) MKS Dąbrowa Górnicza	96

Final
(Austria) GGMT Vienna	72
(Poland) MKS Dąbrowa Górnicza	86

== Awards ==
All official awards of the 2022–23 Alpe Adria Cup.

=== MVP of the Month ===
Month	Player	Team	Ref.
2022
September	(Bosnia and Herzegovina) Nikola Gajić	(Romania) SCM Ohma Mozzart Bet Timisoara	
October	(Bosnia and Herzegovina) Nikola Gajić	(Romania) SCM Ohma Mozzart Bet Timisoara	
November	(United States) Alonzo Verge	(Poland) MKS Dąbrowa Górnicza	
December	(United States) Shane Gatling	(Slovakia) BC Komárno	
