= Zaccheus Darko-Kelly =

American basketball player (born 1997)

Zaccheus Darko–Kelly
No. 2 – Kapfenberg Bulls
- Position: Shooting guard
- League: Austrian Basketball Superliga

Personal information
- Born: 3 May 1997 (age 29) Great Falls, Montana, U.S.
- Listed height: 6 ft 6 in (1.98 m)
- Listed weight: 205 lb (93 kg)

Career information
- High school: Sentinel (Missoula, Montana)
- College: Montana Western (2016–2018); Providence (Montana) (2019–2021)
- NBA draft: 2021: undrafted
- Playing career: 2021–present

Career history
- 2021–2022: Helsinki Seagulls
- 2022: PAOK Thessaloniki
- 2023–2024: Tigers Tübingen
- 2024: Otago Nuggets
- 2024–2025: Kataja
- 2025–2026: Iraklis Thessaloniki
- 2026–present: Kapfenberg Bulls

Career highlights
- Finnish Cup winner (2022); 2× First-team NAIA All-American (2020, 2021); Second-team NAIA All-American (2019); 2× Frontier Player of the Year (2020, 2021); 3× First-team All-Frontier (2018, 2020, 2021); Frontier Freshman of the Year (2017)

Zaccheus Darko–Kelly (born May 3, 1997) is an American professional basketball player for the Kapfenberg Bulls of the Austrian Basketball Superliga. He played college basketball for the Montana Western Bulldogs and the Providence Argonauts.

== High school career ==
Darko-Kelly played basketball for Sentinel High School in Missoula, Montana. In his senior season, he averaged 15.8 points and five rebounds per game, earning all-state honors. Darko-Kelly signed with Montana Western, the only four-year college to offer him a basketball scholarship.

== College career ==
As a freshman at Montana Western, Darko-Kelly averaged 9.1 points and was named Frontier Freshman of the Year. He assumed a leading role in the following season. As a sophomore, he averaged 15.4 points and 6.6 rebounds per game, receiving Second Team National Association of Intercollegiate Athletics (NAIA) All-American and First Team All-Frontier honors.

For his junior season, Darko-Kelly transferred to the University of Providence after Steve Keller, his head coach at Montana Western, was hired there. He sat out for one year due to transfer rules. On February 21, 2020, Darko-Kelly recorded a career-high 40 points and 13 rebounds in a 93–76 win against Montana Western. That month, he became the first player to ever win three straight NAIA Division I National Player of the Week awards, averaging 30.8 points, 10.7 rebounds and 7.7 assists per game during that span. As a junior, Darko-Kelly averaged 22.5 points, eight rebounds, 5.7 assists, 2.3 steals and 1.4 blocks per game, surpassing the program single-season scoring record. He was selected as a First Team NAIA All-American, Frontier Player of the Year and a finalist for the Bevo Francis Award. In his senior season, Darko-Kelly led his team to Frontier regular season and tournament titles. He averaged 18.4 points, 9.4 rebounds, 5.2 assists, 1.5 steals and 1.3 blocks per game, and repeated as a First Team NAIA All-American and Frontier Player of the Year. He chose to forgo his additional year of college eligibility.

== Professional career ==
After going undrafted in the 2021 NBA draft, Darko-Kelly joined the Toronto Raptors for the 2021 NBA Summer League.

After initially signing with Riesen Ludwigsburg of the German Basketball Bundesliga, Darko-Kelly joined Helsinki Seagulls of the Finnish Korisliiga for the 2021–22 season.

Darko-Kelly joined PAOK of the Greek Basket League and the Basketball Champions League for the 2022–23 season, but in early November, he suffered a season-ending leg injury.

For the 2023–24 season, Darko-Kelly joined German team Tigers Tübingen.

On March 20, 2024, Darko-Kelly signed with the Otago Nuggets for the 2024 New Zealand NBL season.

He joined Finnish team Kataja for the 2024–25 season. On July 8, 2025, Darko–Kelly signed a two-year contract with Iraklis of the Greek Basketball League.
