= Elijah Wilson =

American basketball player (born 1995)

Free agent
- Position: Shooting guard

Personal information
- Born: May 14, 1994 (age 32) Wilmington, North Carolina, U.S.
- Listed height: 1.93 m (6 ft 4 in)
- Listed weight: 93 kg (205 lb)

Career information
- High school: Laney high school (wilmington, North Carolina)
- College: Coastal Carolina (2013–2017)
- NBA draft: 2017: undrafted
- Playing career: 2017–present

Career history
- 2017–2018: Flyers Wels
- 2018–2019: Kapfenberg Bulls
- 2019–2020: Heroes Den Bosch
- 2020–2021: MKS Dąbrowa Górnicza
- 2021: Varese
- 2021–2022: Start Lublin

Career highlights
- ABL champion (2019); ABL Finals MVP (2019)

Elijah Wilson (born May 14, 1995) is an American professional basketball player who last played for Start Lublin of the Polish Basketball League. He played collegiately for Coastal Carolina before turning professional in 2017. He formerly played in Austria. He won the 2019 ABL championship with Kapfenberg Bulls and afterwards was named the Finals MVP.

Wilson spent the 2020–21 season with MKS Dąbrowa Górnicza of the Polish Basketball League, averaging 14.8 points per game. On July 19, 2021, he signed with Pallacanestro Varese of the Lega Basket Serie A.

He did not conclude the season with Varese returning to the Poland signing with Start Lublin.

== Honours ==
Kapfenberg Bulls

- Austrian Basketball Bundesliga: 2018–19
- ABL Finals MVP: 2019
