= Zack Wagenmann =

American football player (born 1992)

No. 94, 49
- Position: Outside linebacker

Personal information
- Born: August 8, 1992 (age 34); Missoula, Montana
- Listed height: 6 ft 4 in (1.93 m)
- Listed weight: 249 lb (113 kg)

Career information
- High school: Missoula (MT) Sentinel
- College: Montana
- NFL draft: 2015: undrafted

Career history
- Arizona Cardinals (2015)
- Stats at Pro Football Reference

Zack Wagenmann (born August 8, 1992) is an American former football outside linebacker. He played college football for the University of Montana, and signed as an undrafted free agent by the Arizona Cardinals following the 2015 NFL draft.

== Early life ==
Wagenmann attended Sentinel High School in Missoula, Montana. There he was a second-team all-state selection in football as a senior. Also a first-team all-conference pick for basketball as a junior. He earned two letters for both football and track and field, and three letters for basketball. He served as team captain in football and basketball as a senior.

== College career ==
In 2010, Wagenmann was a redshirt. He was also named University of Montana co-defensive "Scout Team Player of the Year." In 2011, he played in all 14 games. He recorded 13 tackles, including one tackle for a loss. 2012 proved to be a breakout season for Wagenmann. He totaled 50 tackles, 13 tackles for loss, as well as leading the Grizzlies in sacks with 11.5. He was named to three All-American teams. In 2013, Zack started all 13 games. He totaled 8.5 sacks, 16.5 tackles for loss, 64 tackles, and 3 forced fumbles. In 2014, he wore the #37 legacy number for the Griz. He had 17.5 sacks, 22.5 tackles for loss, and six forced fumbles. He was a first-team FCS All-American, first-team All-Big Sky, and Big Sky Defensive Player of the Year. He was also a finalist for the Buck Buchanan Award.

== Professional career ==
=== Arizona Cardinals ===
On May 2, 2015, Wagenmann signed as an undrafted free agent with the Arizona Cardinals. He was waived on August 18, 2015, after re-injuring his foot. He spent the entire 2015 season on the injured reserved list. On August 14, 2016, Wagenmann and the Cardinals reached an injury settlement and was released.
