= Basket Flames =

Professional basketball club in Vienna, Austria

- Leagues: 2. ÖBL
- Founded: 2012
- Arena: Mollardgasse
- Location: Vienna, Austria
- Team colors: White, Black, Lime Green
- Head coach: Franz Zderadicka
- Website: www.basketflames.at
Home	Away

Basket Flames is a professional basketball association and sports club based in Vienna, Austria.

The teams Basket Flames Union (originally Union Kuenring Flames) and Basket Flames WAT (originally Basket Clubs Vienna Juniors) founded the sports association "Basket Flames" at the beginning of the 2012/13 season. Since the conception of the association, the women's team of the Basket Flames has played in the highest league of professional women's basketball, the Austrian Women's Basketball Bundesliga (also known as the Austrian Slovak Women's Basketball League). Prior to this, the former Union Kuenring Flames team had also been playing in this league as late as the 2009/10 season.

With more than 25 teams and over 350 active players as of the 2017/18 season, Basket Flames are Vienna's largest basketball association.

== Achievements ==
In the 2012/2013 season the Basket Flames were runners-up in the Basketball Zweite Liga, having ceded the top spot to BK Mattersburg Rocks.
