= Basketball Zweite Liga =

Second-tier basketball league in Austria

- Organising body: Basketball Austria
- Founded: 2007; 19 years ago
- First season: 2007–2008
- Country: Austria
- Confederation: FIBA Europe
- Number of teams: 15
- Level on pyramid: 2
- Promotion to: Austrian Basketball Superliga
- Domestic cup: Austrian Cup
- Current champions: Union Deutsch Wagram Alligators (1st title) (2025–26)
- Most championships: Mattersburg Rocks; Vienna DC Timberwolves; Haustechnik Güssing Blackbirds (3 titles each)
- Website: Home page

The Basketball Zweite Liga (B2L) is the second tier basketball league in Austria. The winners of each season are promoted to the Austrian Basketball Superliga (BSL), if meeting the league requirements.

== History ==
The second division was founded in 2006–07, but that season just 4 teams participated. After that season the league was divided in three regional divisions. In the 2011–12 season all teams in the league played each other again. Before the start of the 2013–14 season, both the Bundesliga and 2. Bundesliga were formed to leagues with 11 teams. Since the 2014–15 season, one team that was relegated from the first league will start playing in the second division.

== Clubs ==
- BBU Salzburg
- Future Team Steiermark
- Haustechnik Güssing Blackbirds
- KOŠ Celovec
- Mistelbach Mustangs
- Pirlo Kufstein Towers
- Raiffeisen Dornbirn Lions
- Raiffeisen Mattersburg Rocks
- Safare Traiskirchen Lions NexGen
- SWARCO RAIDERS Tirol
- Union Deutsch Wagram Alligators
- Upper Austrian Ballers
- Vienna Timberwolves
- Vienna United
- Wörthersee Piraten

== Champions ==
Season	Champion	Result	Runner-up
2007–08	LZ Niederösterreich	80–74	Silverminers Schwaz
2008–09	KOŠ Celovec	91–85	LZ Niederösterreich Süd
2009–10	Vienna DC Timberwolves	78–50	UKJ Mistelbach
2010–11	Dornbirn Lions	92–64	Silverminers Schwaz
2011–12	Mattersburg Rocks	2–1	UJK Mistelbach
2012–13	Mattersburg Rocks (2)	2–0	Basket Flames
2013–14	Mattersburg Rocks (3)	2–0	Vienna DC Timberwolves
2014–15	Vienna DC Timberwolves (2)	2–0	Sankt Pölten
2015–16	Sankt Pölten	2–0	Mattersburg Rocks
2016–17	Raiders Villach	3–2	Sankt Pölten
2017–18	Vienna DC Timberwolves (3)	2–1	Jennersdorf Blackbirds
2018–19	Jennersdorf Blackbirds	2–0	Sankt Pölten
2019–20	Playoffs cancelled due to the COVID-19 pandemic		
2020–21	Güssing/Jennersdorf Blackbirds (2)	2–1	Fürstenfeld Panthers
2021–22	Fürstenfeld Panthers	2–1	Güssing/Jennersdorf Blackbirds
2022–23	Haustechnik Güssing Blackbirds (3)	2–0	Mistelbach Mustangs
2023–24	Mistelbach Mustangs	2–1	Union Deutsch Wagram Alligators
2024–25	Wörthersee Piraten	2–1	Mistelbach Mustangs
2025–26	Union Deutsch Wagram Alligators	2–1	Mistelbach Mustangs
