= Sentinel High School =

Public high school in Montana, United States

Coordinates: 46°50′51″N 114°00′34″W

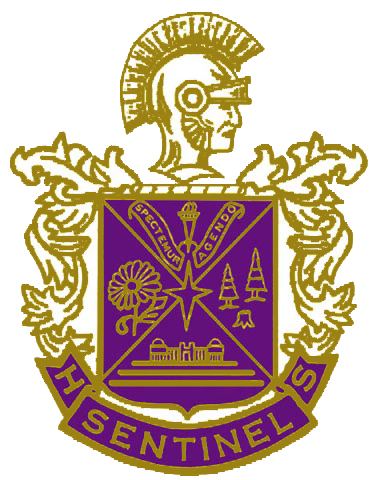

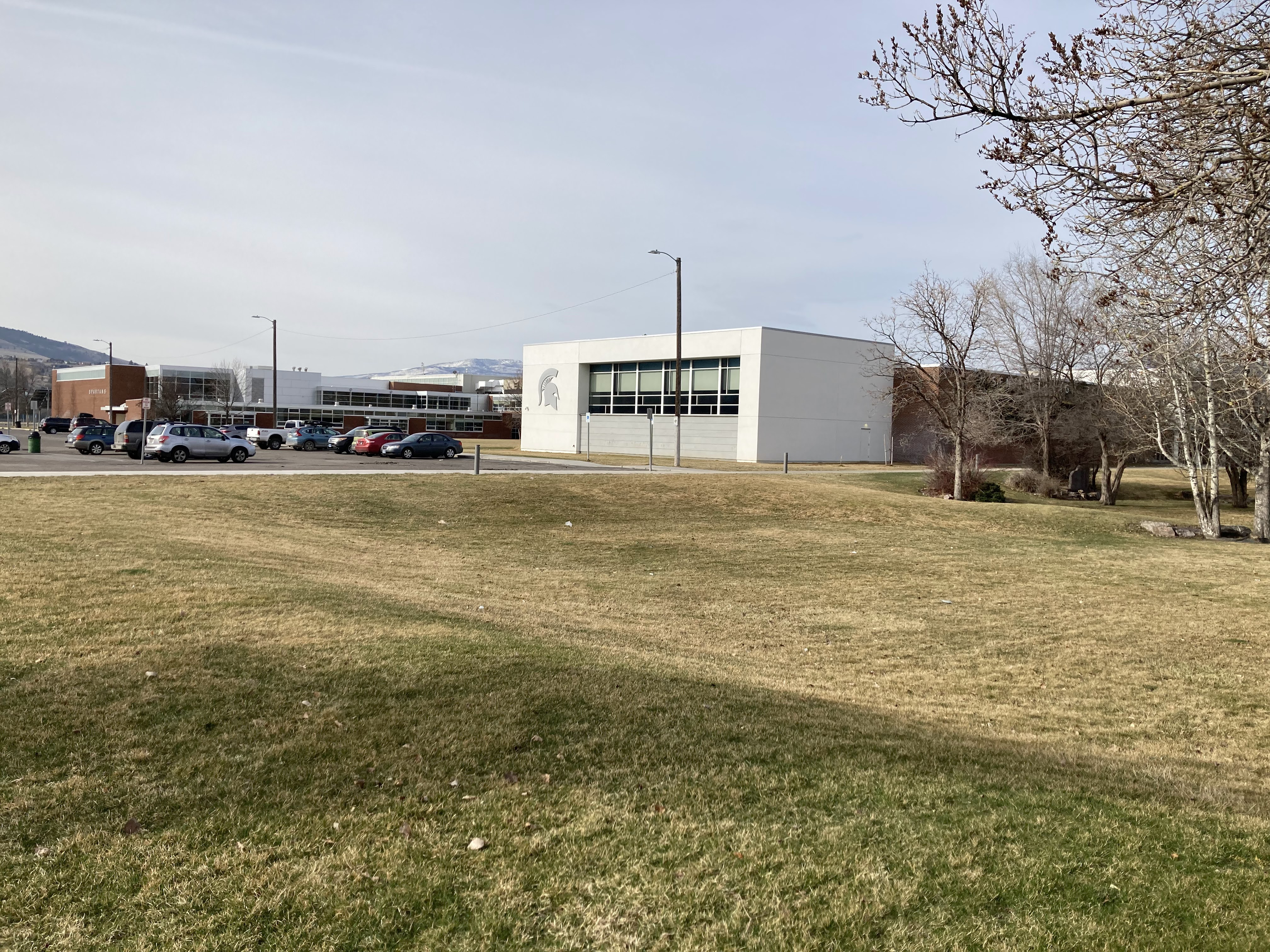

Location
- 901 South Avenue West; Missoula, Montana 59801; United States

Information
- School type: Public, secondary school
- Motto: Spectemur Agendo Latin motto meaning "Let us be judged by our acts"
- Established: 1965; 61 years ago 1956; 70 years ago (as Missoula County HS)
- School district: Missoula County Public Schools District No. 1
- Principal: Stephanie Thennis
- Staff: 87.32 (FTE)
- Grades: 9–12
- Enrollment: 1,386 (2023–2024)
- Student to teacher ratio: 15.87
- Language: English
- Campus: Suburban
- Colors: Purple & Gold
- Team name: Spartans
- Rivals: Hellgate, Big Sky
- Yearbook: Bitterroot
- Communities served: Missoula
- Elevation: 3,190 ft (970 m) AMSL
- Website: sentinel.mcpsmt.org

Sentinel High School is a four-year public high school in the western United States, located in Missoula, Montana. In the Missoula County Public Schools District No. 1., Sentinel has approximately 1,300 students, and a faculty of approximately 100. Sentinel was ranked sixth-best high school in the state of Montana, two spots behind the district's Hellgate. Big Sky and Seeley-Swan were unranked.

== History ==
Missoula County High School added a second campus in the fall of 1956, with freshmen staying at the Higgins Avenue unit (built in 1908, now Hellgate High School), and the three upper classes moving to the new building on South Avenue, approximately 1.5 miles (2.4 km) southwest. Eight years later, the Hellgate and Sentinel names were established for the respective sites; the incoming junior class (1966) was divided between the campuses, with the full senior class (1965) at South Avenue in the last year as MCHS. In the summer of 1965, each campus became a stand alone four-year high school; the team names and colors of MCHS stayed at Sentinel, while new team names and colors were created for Hellgate, with all new traditions.

== Athletics ==
- Boys basketball
- Girls basketball
- Cheerleading
- Cross country
- Football
- Golf
- Boys soccer
- Girls soccer
- Softball
- Baseball (Most recent sport circa 2024)
- Swimming
- Tennis
- Track
- Volleyball
- Wrestling

== Notable alumni ==
- Zack Wagenmann (2010), football player who played for the Montana Grizzlies and was on the Arizona Cardinals practice squad
- Zaccheus Darko-Kelly (2016), basketball player who plays professionally in New Zealand
- Adam Jones (2023), football player for the Montana State Bobcats
