= 2018–19 Austrian Basketball Bundesliga =

Austrian Basketball Bundesliga
- Season: 2018–19
- Duration: 4 October 2018 – May 2019
- Teams: 10

Regular season
- Season MVP: Hayden Lescault

Finals
- Champions: ece Bulls Kapfenberg; 7th title
- Runners-up: Swans Gmunden
- Finals MVP: Elijah Wilson

The 2018–19 Austrian Basketball Bundesliga (German: Österreichische Basketball Bundesliga) season, for sponsorships reasons named the Admiral Basketball Bundesliga (ABL), was the 73rd season of the first tier of basketball in Austria. ece Bulls Kapfenberg won its seventh domestic title.

Hayden Lescault of the Oberwart Gunners was named Most Valuable Player.

== Teams ==
Location of teams in 2018–19 ÖBL

Vienna DC Timberwolves will make their debut in the ÖBL.

Club	Place	Arena	Capacity
Swans Gmunden	Gmunden	Volksbank Arena	2,200
Raiffeisen Panthers Fürstenfeld	Fürstenfeld	Stadthalle Fürstenfeld	1,200
Arkadia Traiskirchen Lions	Traiskirchen	Lions Dome	1,200
ece Bulls Kapfenberg	Kapfenberg	Sporthalle Walfersam	1,000
Hallmann Vienna	Wien	Wiener Stadthalle B	1,000
Raiffeisen Flyers Wels	Wels	Raiffeisen Arena	1,700
Xion Dukes Klosterneuburg	Klosterneuburg	Happyland Klosterneuburg	1,000
UBSC Raiffeisen Graz	Graz	Unionhalle	600
Unger Steel Gunners Oberwart	Oberwart	Sporthalle Oberwart	2,500
Vienna DC Timberwolves	Wien	Wiener Stadthalle B	1,000

== Regular season ==
=== Standings ===
Pos	Team	Pld	W	L	PF	PA	PD	Pts	Qualification
1	ece Bulls Kapfenberg	36	27	9	2911	2538	+373	54	Qualification to semifinals
2	Unger Steel Gunners Oberwart	36	27	9	2891	2662	+229	54	Qualification to semifinals
3	Swans Gmunden	36	24	12	3011	2725	+286	48	Qualification to semifinals
4	Klosterneuburg Dukes	36	22	14	2841	2715	+126	44	Qualification to semifinals
5	Raiffeisen Flyers Wels	36	20	16	2935	2915	+20	40	Qualification to semifinals
6	Arkadia Traiskirchen Lions	36	18	18	2711	2699	+12	36	Qualification to semifinals
7	Hallmann Vienna	36	17	19	2910	2896	+14	34	Qualification to semifinals
8	Vienna DC Timberwolves	36	12	24	2772	3050	−278	24	Qualification to semifinals
9	UBSC Raiffeisen Graz	36	9	27	2825	3042	−217	18	
10	Raiffeisen Fürstenfeld Panthers	36	4	32	2676	3241	−565	8	

Source: ÖBL

=== Results ===
Home \ Away	TRA	KAP	VIE	KLO	WEL	FUR	SWA	GRA	OBE	TIM	TRA	KAP	VIE	KLO	WEL	FUR	SWA	GRA	OBE	TIM
Arkadia Traiskirchen Lions	—	60–69	83–91	85–58	96–67	71–63	83–79	67–64	80–67	78–77	—	66–70	85–66	88–87	96–67	73–69	80–87	77–65	72–73	92–91
ece Bulls Kapfenberg	81–60	—	66–92	76–66	91–76	93–85	70–79	86–65	80–71	87–44	84–57	—	81–79	80–63	88–63	93–85	79–66	74–63	73–77	103–74
Hallmann Vienna	89–86	72–69	—	81–93	75–74	111–74	78–86	75–100	83–86	66–73	56–91	56–62	—	80–84	76–81	108–69	79–85	72–76	77–76	81–76
Klosterneuburg Dukes	84–81	82–62	76–69	—	78–76	88–55	73–72	83–76	75–56	75–77	80–67	71–87	82–70	—	75–83	83–77	77–80	61–65	64–62	95–60
Raiffeisen Flyers Wels	69–84	81–65	88–82	76–86	—	75–81	83–75	95–93	65–67	85–101	81–72	93–89	88–80	81–80	—	89–80	85–80	100–78	69–68	95–55
Raiffeisen Fürstenfeld Panthers	55–62	60–87	90–98	83–85	72–111	—	74–87	86–82	82–99	82–84	70–91	73–84	101–109	82–100	84–72	—	78–83	68–101	82–96	80–85
Swans Gmunden	75–64	85–87	67–69	89–74	96–82	105–59	—	89–71	109–67	92–80	87–67	68–81	88–81	91–86	99–69	85–67	—	81–74	76–81	81–61
UBSC Raiffeisen Graz	68–70	74–73	90–91	70–71	85–87	108–78	79–92	—	67–81	81–90	79–73	55–110	75–87	70–90	85–87	70–106	83–102	—	97–107	96–90
Unger Steel Gunners Oberwart	78–65	69–83	86–81	75–61	89–64	86–44	83–78	86–78	—	97–78	78–64	75–66	84–89	88–80	78–60	103–66	84–79	69–60	—	97–78
Vienna DC Timberwolves	63–76	82–101	71–87	77–85	81–115	91–69	63–70	104–95	65–86	—	96–80	75–84	54–74	68–90	79–90	86–71	74–68	97–80	75–77	—

Source: ÖBL
Legend: Blue = home team win; Red = away team win.

== Play-offs ==
Quarterfinals were played in a best-of-three games format, semifinals in a 2–2–1 format and the final in a best-of-seven format 2–2–1–1–1.

=== Bracket ===
Quarterfinals
ece Bulls Kapfenberg	3
Vienna DC Timberwolves	0
Klosterneuburg Dukes	3
Raiffeisen Flyers Wels	0
Unger Steel Gunners Oberwart	3
Hallmann Vienna	1
Swans Gmunden	3
Arkadia Traiskirchen Lions	2

Semifinals
ece Bulls Kapfenberg	3
Klosterneuburg Dukes	1
Unger Steel Gunners Oberwart	1
Swans Gmunden	3

Finals
ece Bulls Kapfenberg	3
Swans Gmunden	0

=== Quarterfinals ===
The team with the higher seed played game one and three (if necessary) at home.

Team 1	Series	Team 2	Game 1	Game 2	Game 3	Game 4	Game 5
ece Bulls Kapfenberg	3–0	Vienna DC Timberwolves	78–64	96–57	91–81		
Unger Steel Gunners Oberwart	3–1	Hallmann Vienna	97–64	84–68	86–88	82–78	
Swans Gmunden	3–2	Arkadia Traiskirchen Lions	91–45	73–68	72–74	72–76	70–61
Klosterneuburg Dukes	3–0	Raiffeisen Flyers Wels	85–70	78–77	87–73		

=== Semifinals ===
The team with the higher seed played game one, two and 5 (if necessary) at home.

Team 1	Series	Team 2	Game 1	Game 2	Game 3	Game 4	Game 5
ece Bulls Kapfenberg	3–1	Klosterneuburg Dukes	84–90	89–82	58–57	54–43	
Unger Steel Gunners Oberwart	1–3	Swans Gmunden	92–94	58–71	81–70	76–92	

=== Finals ===
The team with the higher seed played game one, two and five (if necessary) at home.

Team 1	Series	Team 2	Game 1	Game 2	Game 3	Game 4	Game 5
ece Bulls Kapfenberg	3–0	Swans Gmunden	91–73	69–61	71–65		

== Austrian clubs in European competitions ==
Team	Competition	Progress
ece Bulls Kapfenberg	FIBA Europe Cup	Second qualifying round

== Austrian clubs in international competitions ==
Team	Competition	Progress
Arkadia Traiskirchen Lions	Alpe Adria Cup	Regular season
Hallmann Vienna	Alpe Adria Cup	Regular season
Klosterneuburg Dukes	Alpe Adria Cup	Regular season
UBSC Raiffeisen Graz	Alpe Adria Cup	Regular season
