= Michael Fraser (basketball) =

Canadian basketball player

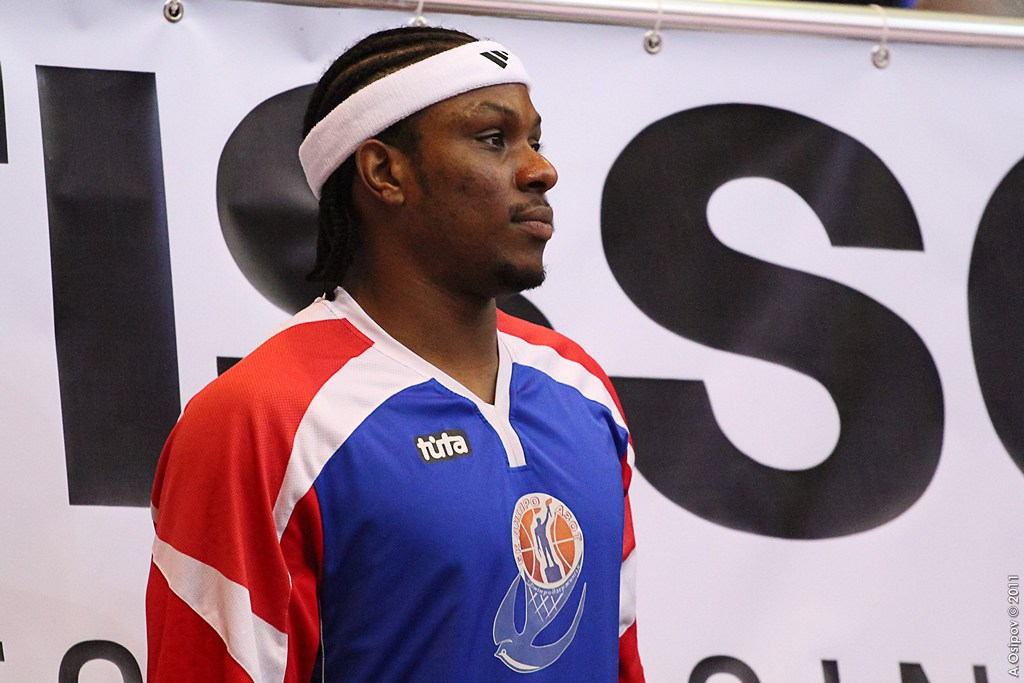
- Fraser at Ukrainian All-star game in 2011

Brampton Honey Badgers
- Title: Assistant coach
- League: CEBL

Personal information
- Born: June 28, 1984 (age 42) Ottawa, Ontario, Canada
- Listed height: 6 ft 8 in (2.03 m)
- Listed weight: 244.2 lb (111 kg)

Career information
- College: Oklahoma Baptist (2005–2007)
- NBA draft: 2007: undrafted
- Playing career: 2007–2020
- Position: Power forward / center

Career history

Playing
- 2007–2008: Panthers Fürstenfeld
- 2008–2009: Antranik Beirut
- 2009: Al Arabi
- 2009–2010: Hoverla Ivano-Frankivsk
- 2010: Al Kuwait
- 2010: BCM Gravelines
- 2010–2011: Dnipro-Azot
- 2012: Soles de Mexicali
- 2012–2013: Byblos Club
- 2013: Igokea
- 2013–2014: Byblos Club
- 2014–2015: Homenetmen Beirut
- 2015–2017: Polfarmex Kutno
- 2017: Sagesse Club
- 2017–2018: Ciclista Olímpico
- 2018: Rosa Radom
- 2018: Pallacanestro Piacentina
- 2018–2019: AZS Koszalin
- 2019: Hamilton Honey Badgers
- 2019–2020: MKS Dąbrowa Górnicza

Coaching
- 2022–present: Hamilton / Brampton Honey Badgers (assistant)

Career highlights
- Austrian Basketball Bundesliga All-Star Game MVP (2008)

Michael Fraser (born June 28, 1984) is a Canadian former professional basketball player currently working as an assistant coach for the Brampton Honey Badgers of the Canadian Elite Basketball League (CEBL). He played college basketball for the Oklahoma Baptist Bison.

== Professional career ==
In July 2013, he signed with KK Igokea. He was released in October after playing only one game. He then returned to Byblos Club for the rest of the season. In November 2014, he signed with Homenetmen Beirut for the 2014–15 season.

On September 1, 2015, he signed with Polfarmex Kutno of the Polish Basketball League. After two seasons with Polish club, in September 2017, he returned to Lebanon and signed with Sagesse Club.

In 2018, he played for Rosa Radom of the Polish Basketball League.
