= Hayden Lescault =

American basketball player

Lions de Genève
- Position: Guard
- League: Swiss Basketball League

Personal information
- Born: March 24, 1992 (age 34) Folsom, California, U.S.
- Listed height: 6 ft 5 in (1.96 m)
- Listed weight: 210 lb (95 kg)

Career information
- College: Point Loma (2010–2015)
- Playing career: 2015–present

Career history
- 2015–2016: Karlsruhe
- 2016–2017: Glasgow Rocks
- 2017–2018: Elchinge
- 2018–2019: Oberwart Gunners
- 2019–2020: Rabotnički
- 2021: Borac Banja Luka
- 2021–present: Lions de Genève

Career highlights
- ÖBL Most Valuable Player (2019)

Hayden Lescault (born March 24, 1992) is an American professional basketball player for Lions de Genève of the Swiss Basketball League.

== College career ==
As a senior at Point Loma in 2014–15 Lescault averaged 12.3 points, 3.9 rebounds and 3.6 assists in 31.8 minutes in 28 appearances.

== Professional career ==
On May 18, 2019, Lescault was named Most Valuable Player of the Austrian Basketball Bundesliga's 2018–19 season.

On August 27, 2019, he signed with Macedonian club Rabotnički.

In January 2021, Lescault signed with Bosnian team Borac Banja Luka. He left after the end of the 2020–21 season.
