= 2016–17 Austrian Basketball Bundesliga =

2016–17 Admiral Basketball Bundesliga^{1}
- Season: 2016–17
- Teams: 9

Regular season
- Season MVP: (Serbia) Predrag Miletić

Finals
- Champions: ece Bulls Kapfenberg (5th title)
- Runners-up: Redwell Gunners Oberwart
- Finals MVP: (Serbia) Bogić Vujošević
- ^{1} Sponsored league name, referring to Admiral.

The 2016–17 Österreichische Basketball Bundesliga season, for sponsorships reasons named the Admiral Basketball Bundesliga, was the 71st season of the first tier of basketball in Austria.

== Teams ==
Location of teams in 2015–16 ÖBL

Club	Place	Arena	Capacity
Swans Gmunden	Gmunden	Volksbank Arena	2,200
WBC Raiffeisen Wels	Wels	Raiffeisen Arena	1,700
Raiffeisen Panthers Fürstenfeld	Fürstenfeld	Stadthalle Fürstenfeld	1,200
Arkadia Traiskirchen Lions	Traiskirchen	Lions Dome	1,200
ece Bulls Kapfenberg	Kapfenberg	Sporthalle Walfersam	1,000
Hallmann Vienna	Wien	Wiener Stadthalle B	1,000
Redwell Gunners Oberwart	Oberwart	Sporthalle Oberwart	2,500
Xion Dukes Klosterneuburg	Klosterneuburg	Happyland Klosterneuburg	1,000
UBSC Raiffeisen Graz	Graz	Unionhalle	600

== Regular season ==
=== Standings ===
Pos	Team	Pld	W	L	PF	PA	PD	Pts	Qualification
1	Redwell Gunners Oberwart	32	27	5	2586	2188	+398	54	Qualification to semifinals
2	Swans Gmunden	32	22	10	2443	2294	+149	44	Qualification to semifinals
3	ece Bulls Kapfenberg	32	21	11	2484	2298	+186	42	Qualification to quarterfinals
4	Hallmann Vienna	32	18	14	2484	2341	+143	36	Qualification to quarterfinals
5	WBC Raiffeisen Wels	32	16	16	2370	2415	−45	32	Qualification to quarterfinals
6	Arkadia Traiskirchen Lions	32	16	16	2476	2342	+134	32	Qualification to quarterfinals
7	Raiffeisen Fürstenfeld Panthers	32	13	19	2375	2467	−92	26	
8	UBSC Raiffeisen Graz	32	7	25	2097	2605	−508	14	
9	Klosterneuburg Dukes	32	4	28	2069	2434	−365	8	

Source: ÖBL

== Play-offs ==
Quarter-finals
4 Hallmann Vienna	80	66	64
5 WBC Raiffeisen Wels	64	81	69
3 ece Bulls Kapfenberg	97	95
6 Arkadia Traiskirchen Lions	80	82

Semi-finals
1 Redwell Gunners Oberwart	75	89	57	79	77
5 WBC Raiffeisen Wels	84	83	63	62	67
2 Swans Gmunden	73	79	68	59
3 ece Bulls Kapfenberg	92	65	81	61

Final
1 Redwell Gunners Oberwart	61	56	55	72	64
3 ece Bulls Kapfenberg	57	66	56	73	73

== Austrian clubs in international competitions ==
Team	Competition	Progress
Redwell Gunners Oberwart	FIBA Europe Cup	Second round

Team	Competition	Progress
Kapfenberg Bulls	Alpe Adria Cup	Quarterfinals
Arkadia Traiskirchen Lions	Alpe Adria Cup	Quarterfinals
Klosterneuburg Dukes	Alpe Adria Cup	Regular season
