= Union Kuenring =

Union Kuenring, mostly known as Union Kuenring Flames or ukFlames, is a women's basketball club based in Vienna, Austria.

== History ==
Union Kuenring was founded in 1951 by Professor Ander. Eleven years later the club was taken over by Franz Mrkvicka and in the following three decades Union Kuenring rose on to a successful basketball club in Austria. The men's section seceded in 1975.

== Men ==
At the beginning there was also a successful men's team. In the 1959/60 season they won their first Viennese championship title. In the 1965/66 season were the lords even Austrian Champion. The next season Union Kuenring participated in the FIBA European Champions Cup and eliminated in the first round by Steaua București (81–96 loss in Bucharest and 69–99 in Vienna). In 1975 separated the men's department from the association and founded his own club.

=== Honours & achievements ===
Austrian League

- Winners (1): 1965–66

== Women ==
In 1963 the present AWBL – Austrian Women's Basketball Bundesliga was founded, were the ladies of the Union Kuenring from the outset title candidates. As early as 1966, and in consequence until 1969 the championship was achieved. This success was repeated in the 19 subsequent seasons. From 1970 to 1986 Union Kuenring played with two teams in the Bundesliga. 1988 jumped from the main sponsor and the club had to for a short time from the Bundesliga withdraw. 1997 returned a very young, constructed from their own offspring, women's team back in the Bundesliga. The only team that played without Legionnaire inner space 4 has been reached immediately. In 1999 in addition to the Bundesliga team also Wiener division was heavily promoted, were being recovered in follow some championships.

=== Honours & achievements ===
Austrian Women's League

- Winners (17): 1966–67, 1967–68, 1968–69, 1969–70, 1970–71, 1971–72, 1972–73, 1973–74, 1974–75, 1975–76, 1976–77, 1979–80, 1980–81, 1981–82, 1982–83, 1983–84, 1984–85
