= Mark Sanchez (basketball) =

American-Mexican basketball player (born 1987)

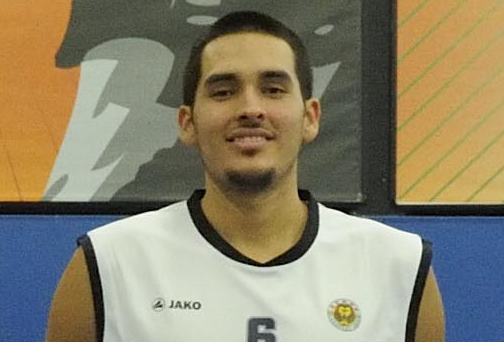
- Sanchez as a member of Aris Leeuwarden in 2011

Personal information
- Born: January 17, 1987 (age 39) Tucson, Arizona
- Listed height: 6 ft 7 in (2.01 m)
- Listed weight: 235 lb (107 kg)

Career information
- High school: Desert View (Tucson, Arizona)
- College: Pima CC (2005–2007); Boise State (2007–2009)
- NBA draft: 2009: undrafted
- Playing career: 2009–2015
- Position: Power forward / small forward
- Number: 5, 6, 10, 43

Career history
- 2009: Hapoel Holon
- 2009–2010: Lobos Grises UAD
- 2010–2012: Aris Leeuwarden
- 2012–2014: Kapfenberg Bulls
- 2014: ALM Évreux
- 2014–2015: Donar

Career highlights
- Austrian League MVP (2014); Austrian Cup champion (2014); Austrian Cup MVP (2014); 2x DBL All-Star (2011, 2015); All-DBL Team (2015); Dutch Cup champion (2015)

Mark Sanchez (born January 17, 1987) is a former American-Mexican professional basketball player.

== Professional career ==
Aris Leeuwarden signed Sanchez for the 2010–11 season, and later he re-signed to also play the 2011–12 season for Aris.

Sanchez signed with the Austrian team ece Bulls Kapfenberg in 2012. He was brought back after his first season. In his second season, he was named the Austrian Basketball Cup MVP. With Kapfenberg he lost in the Finals of the Austrian league to Güssing, but Sanchez did get the league's MVP award.

For the 2014–15 season he first signed with ALM Évreux Basket, but after he got cut by the team he signed with the Dutch club Donar on 5 November 2014.

On social media, Sanchez announced his retirement in June 2015.
