= Hallmann =

Hallmann is a German surname. Notable people with the surname include:

- Christian Hallmann (born 1981), Dutch-German Geochemist
- Johannes Hallmann (born 1964), German agricultural scientist
- Klemens Hallmann (born 1976), Austrian entrepreneur and investor
- Piotr Hallmann (born 1987), Polish mixed martial artist
