= Wörthersee Piraten =

Professional basketball club in Klagenfurt am Wörthersee, Austria

- Leagues: 2. ÖBL
- Founded: 1978
- History: B.K. Regenerin Klagenfurt (1978-1990); B.K. Citroën Klagenfurt (1990-1997); Wörthersee Piraten B.C. (1997-present)
- Arena: Sporthalle St.Peter
- Team colors: Black, White, Gold
- President: Franz Sumnitsch
- Website: www.piraten.net
Home	Away

Wörthersee Piraten is a professional basketball club based in Klagenfurt am Wörthersee, Austria. The team played in the ÖBL for the last time in 2009–10. In club history the Piraten reached the ÖBL Finals once, in 2001 and were Cup finalists twice (1998 and 2002).
