= Austrian Women's Basketball Bundesliga =

- Current season, competition or edition: 2024–25 Austrian Women's Basketball Bundesliga
- Sport: Basketball
- Founded: 1948
- First season: 1948-49
- No. of teams: 10
- Country: Austria
- Continent: FIBA Europe (Europe)
- Level on pyramid: 1

The Austrian Women's Basketball Bundesliga (English Austrian Women Basketball League AWBL) is the highest basketball league in Austria.
