= UBSC Graz =

Professional basketball club in Graz, Austria

UBSC Raiffeisen Graz
- Nickname: UBSC Graz
- Leagues: Austrian Basketball Superliga
- Founded: 1977; 48 years ago
- History: Austrian Basketball Bundesliga (ÖBL) prior to 2020
- Arena: Raiffeisen Sportpark Graz
- Capacity: 3,000
- Location: Graz, Austria
- Team colors: blue & yellow
- Main sponsor: Raiffeisen Bank
- Head coach: Ervin Dragsic
- Website: ubsc-graz.at
Home	Away

Union Basket Sport Club Graz, commonly known as UBSC Graz, is a professional basketball club based in Graz, Austria that plays in the Austrian Basketball Bundesliga (German: Österreichische Basketball Bundesliga, ÖBL). Due to sponsorship reasons, the team was previously also known as UBSC Raiffeisen Graz. The home arena of the team is the Raiffeisen Sportpark Graz, an indoor sporting arena with a capacity of approximately 3,000 spectators. The team colors are blue and yellow.

== Current roster ==
Note: Flags indicate national team eligibility at FIBA-sanctioned events. Players may hold other non-FIBA nationalities not displayed.

UBSC Graz roster
Players
Coaches

Pos.	No.	Nat.	Name	Ht.	Age
F/C	2	(United States)	Hawkinson, Bobby	2.08 m (6 ft 10 in)	26 – 2 May 1998
PG	3	(United States)	Cooks, Zach	1.75 m (5 ft 9 in)	26 – 4 March 1999
C	6	(Greece)	Dimakopoulos, Ioannis	2.18 m (7 ft 2 in)	30 – 7 November 1994
G/F	7	(Austria)	Siegmund, Valentin	1.95 m (6 ft 5 in)	21 – 11 May 2003
SG	8	(Austria)	Maresch, Anton	1.93 m (6 ft 4 in)	33 – 8 August 1991
G	9	(Austria)	Isbetcherian, Paul	1.70 m (5 ft 7 in)	25 – 17 January 2000
G/F	12	(Austria)	Simoner, Lukas	1.90 m (6 ft 3 in)	25 – 4 August 1999
F	13	(United States)	Vann, Isaac	1.98 m (6 ft 6 in)	29 – 18 October 1995
PF	15	(United States)	Giddings, Tanner	2.08 m (6 ft 10 in)	30 – 17 April 1994
PG	22	(Austria)	Laschet, Pascal	1.78 m (5 ft 10 in)	22 – 15 August 2002

Head coach

- (Austria) Ervin Dragsic

Assistant coach(es)

- (Greece) Dimitris Sarikas

Legend

- (C) Team captain
- Injured

- Roster
Updated: 10 October 2022

== Season by season ==
Season	Tier	League	Pos.	Austrian Cup
2008–09	1	ÖBL	11th	
2009–10	1	ÖBL	12th	
2010–11	1	ÖBL	8th	
2011–12	1	ÖBL	10th	Runner-up
2012–13	1	ÖBL	9th	Round of 16
2013–14	1	ÖBL	10th	Round of 16
2014–15	1	ÖBL	10th	Quarterfinalist
2015–16	1	ÖBL	9th	Round of 16
2016–17	1	ÖBL	8th	Quarterfinalist
2017–18	1	ÖBL	9th	Round of 16
2018–19	1	ÖBL	9th	Quarterfinalist

== Notable players ==
- Set a club record or won an individual award as a professional player.
- Played at least one official international match for his senior national team at any time.

- (United States) Stanley Whittaker
