= SKN St. Pölten (basketball) =

Professional basketball club in Sankt Pölten, Austria

- Leagues: Austrian Basketball Superliga
- Founded: 1955; 70 years ago
- Arena: Landessportzentrum
- Capacity: 1,000
- Championships: 6 Austrian Championships; 3 Austrian Cups; 1 Austrian Second League
- Website: skn-basketball.at
Home

Sportklub Niederösterreich St. Pölten, commonly known as simply SKN St. Pölten, is a basketball club based in Sankt Pölten, Austria. The club has won the Austrian championship six times, between 1993 and 1999. St. Pölten currently plays in the Superliga, the highest league in Austria.

In 2019, the club agreed with football club SKN St. Pölten to adopt its name and logo.

== Names ==
- Until 2005: UKJ SUBA Sankt Pölten
- 2005–2007: UKJ St. Pölten Haie
- 2007–2008: Sankt Pölten Basketball
- 2008–2012: UBC Sankt Pölten
- 2012–2017: Chin Min Dragons UBC Sankt Pölten
- 2017–2019: UBC Sankt Pölten
- 2019–present: SKN St. Pölten Basketball

== Honours ==
- Austrian Championship (6):

1993, 1995, 1996, 1997, 1998, 1999

- Austrian Basketball Cup (3):

1994, 1996, 1998

- Austrian Second League

Winners (1): 2015–16
Runners-up (2): 2014–15, 2016–17, 2018–19

== Season by season ==
Season	Tier	League	Pos.	Postseason	Austrian Cup
2007–08	1	ÖBL	8		–
2008–09	1	ÖBL	8		–
2009–10	1	2. ÖBL	1		–
2010–11	1	ÖBL	9	–	–
2011–12	1	ÖBL	11	–	–
2012–13	1	ÖBL	11	–	–

== Players ==
=== Current roster ===
Note: Flags indicate national team eligibility at FIBA-sanctioned events. Players may hold other non-FIBA nationalities not displayed.

SKN St. Pölten roster
Players
Coaches

Pos.	No.	Nat.	Name
G	1	(United States)	Kelvin Lewis
G	4	(Austria)	Felix Angerbauer
F	5	(Austria)	Bernhard Dockner
G	7	(Austria)	Steven Kaltenbrunner
G	9	(Austria)	Roman Jagsch
F	12	(Austria)	Florian Trmal
G	13	(Austria)	Lukas Boeck
C	14	(Croatia)	Zvonimir Cutuk
F	15	(Netherlands)	Logan Schilder
F	17	(Austria)	Jakob Wonisch
F	21	(Austria)	Guylain Mbemba
SG	25	(Greece)	Konstantinos Oikonomopoulos

Head coach

(Austria) Andreas Worenz

Assistant coach(es)

(Iceland) Ísak Máni Wíum

Legend

- (C) Team captain
- Injured

- Roster
Updated: 12 November 2020

== Notable former players ==
Either:
- Set a club record or won an individual award as a professional player.
- Played at least one official international match for his senior national team at any time.

- (Finland) Aapeli Alanen
- (Iran) Philip Jalalpoor
