= Austrian Basketball Superliga =

Top basketball league in Austria

- Organising body: Basketball Austria
- Founded: 2019; 7 years ago
- First season: 2019–20
- Country: Austria
- Confederation: FIBA Europe
- Number of teams: 11
- Level on pyramid: 1
- Relegation to: Basketball Zweite Liga
- Domestic cup: Austrian Cup
- Supercup: Austrian Supercup
- International cup(s): Basketball Champions League; FIBA Europe Cup
- Current champions: HEFTE HELFEN Bulls (1st league title; 8th Austrian title) (2025–26)
- Most championships: Swans Gmunden; Oberwart Gunners (2 titles)
- TV partners: Sky Sport; ORF
- Website: https://www.basketballaustria.at/bsl
- 2025–26 Austrian Basketball Superliga

The Austrian Basketball Superliga (English: Basketball Super League) is the highest tier basketball league in Austria. Established in 2019, it replaced the Austrian Basketball Bundesliga (ABL) as the first level competition in the country. The winners of the Superliga are crowned Austrian champions. The competition aimed to start "a new era" in Austrian basketball. In its inaugural season, the competition consisted of ten teams.

== History ==
The Basketball Superliga was established in the summer of 2019 to replace the Austrian Bundsliga. Television contracts were signed with Sky Sport and ORF. All games will also be streamed online. On 9 August 2019, the ten teams that would compete in the inaugural season were announced, with nine teams coming from last ÖBL season.

The new league's first season was ended prematurely because of the COVID-19 pandemic.

On 16 May 2021, Swans Gmunden won the first Superliga championship.

== Format ==
In the Superliga, teams first play each other in the regular season home and away. After this the teams ranked 1–6 and 7-10 are divided in two groups to qualify for the playoffs. In the playoffs, the best eight teams play each other for the national championship in best-of-five series. The two lowest placed teams play against the top two teams of the Basketball Zweite Liga (B2L).

== Clubs ==
| Club | Place | Arena | Capacity |
|---|---|---|---|
| Arkadia Traiskirchen Lions | Traiskirchen | Lions Dome | 1,200 |
| BC Vienna | Wien | Admiral Dome | 1,500 |
| BK IMMOunited Dukes | Klosterneuburg | Happyland Klosterneuburg | 1,000 |
| CITIES Panthers Fürstenfeld | Fürstenfeld | Stadthalle Fürstenfeld | 1,200 |
| COLDAMARIS BBC Nord Dragonz | Eisenstadt | Sportzentrum Eisenstadt | 500 |
| HEFTE HELFEN Bulls | Kapfenberg | Sporthalle Walfersam | 1,000 |
| Raiffeisen Flyers Wels | Wels | Raiffeisen Arena | 1,700 |
| Raiffeisen Swans Gmunden | Gmunden | Volksbank Arena | 2,200 |
| SKN St. Pölten | Sankt Pölten | Landessportzentrum | 1,000 |
| Raiffeisen Graz | Graz | Raiffeisen Sportpark Graz | 3,000 |
| Unger Steel Gunners Oberwart | Oberwart | Sporthalle Oberwart | 1,700 |

== Champions ==
| Season | Champions | Runners-up | Score |
|---|---|---|---|
| 2020–21 | Swans Gmunden | Kapfenberg Bulls | 3–1 |
| 2021–22 | BC Vienna | Swans Gmunden | 3–1 |
| 2022–23 | Swans Gmunden | BC Vienna | 3–1 |
| 2023–24 | Oberwart Gunners | UBSC Graz | 3–0 |
| 2024–25 | Oberwart Gunners | BBC Nord Dragonz | 3–0 |
| 2025–26 | HEFTE HELFEN Bulls | Oberwart Gunners | 3–2 |
