= Kapfenberg Bulls =

Professional basketball club in Kapfenberg, Austria

- Nickname: Bulls
- Leagues: Austrian Basketball Superliga
- Founded: 1976; 50 years ago
- History: Kapfenberg Bulls; 1976–present
- Arena: Sporthalle Walfersam
- Capacity: 1,000
- Location: Kapfenberg, Austria
- President: Karl Thaller
- Head coach: Michael Schrittwieser
- Championships: 8 Austrian Championships; 4 Austrian Cups; 5 Austrian Supercups
- Website: https://bulls-basketball.eu
Home	Away

Kapfenberg Bulls, also known as Hefte Helfen Bulls for sponsorship reasons, or just simply as Bulls, are an Austrian professional basketball club based in Kapfenberg, Styria. The team plays in the Austrian Basketball Superliga. The Bulls have won seven national championships, four Austrian Cups and five Supercups. Founded in 1976, the team plays its home games in the Sporthalle Walfersam.

== History ==
Between 1991 and 2019, the Kapfenberg Bulls played in the Österreichische Basketball Bundesliga. Between 2001 and 2004, the club had its most successful era, with 4 national domestic league championships in a row. They won their last national title in 2007 (Austrian Basketball Cup). In 2009, they came in third in the Central European Basketball League, which is the best result of an Austrian basketball team in an international tournament.

In 2017, the Kapfenberg Bulls conquered its fifth national domestic league championship, 13 years after their previous one, and repeated success in the next season.

The team joined the Austrian Basketball Superliga in 2019.

== Honors ==
- Austrian Basketball Bundesliga (7):

2000–01, 2001–02, 2002–03, 2003–04, 2016–17, 2017–18, 2018–19

- Austrian Cup (6):

2007, 2014, 2017, 2018, 2019, 2020

- Austrian Supercup (5):

2002, 2003, 2014, 2017, 2018

== Season by season ==
Season	Tier	League	Pos.	Cup	Supercup	European competitions	
2000–01	1	ÖBL	1st	Runner–up		3 Korać Cup	R1
2001–02	1	ÖBL	1st	Runner–up			
2002–03	1	ÖBL	1st	Semifinalist	Champion		
2003–04	1	ÖBL	1st	Semifinalist	Champion	2 ULEB Cup	RS
2004–05	1	ÖBL	3rd	Runner–up	Runner–up	2 ULEB Cup	RS
2005–06	1	ÖBL	3rd	Quarterfinalist		4 EuroCup Challenge	RS
2006–07	1	ÖBL	5th	Champion			
2007–08	1	ÖBL	5th	Last 16	Runner–up		
2008–09	1	ÖBL	5th	Quarterfinalist			
2009–10	1	ÖBL	4th	Runner–up			
2010–11	1	ÖBL	6th	Quarterfinalist			
2011–12	1	ÖBL	3rd				
2012–13	1	ÖBL	4th	Quarterfinalist			
2013–14	1	ÖBL	2nd	Champion			
2014–15	1	ÖBL	3rd		Runner-up		
2015–16	1	ÖBL	7th	Semifinalist			
2016–17	1	ÖBL	1st	Champion			
2017–18	1	ÖBL	1st	Champion	Champion	3 Champions League	QR1
2017–18	1	ÖBL	1st	Champion	Champion	4 FIBA Europe Cup	RS
2018–19	1	ÖBL	1st	Champion	Champion	4 FIBA Europe Cup	QR2
2019–20	1	ABS	3rd	Champion		3 Champions League	QR1
2019–20	1	ABS	3rd	Champion		4 FIBA Europe Cup	RS
2020–21	1	ABS	2nd	Quarterfinalist		4 FIBA Europe Cup	RS
2021–22	1	ABS	6th	Last 16		3 Champions League	QR1
2021–22	1	ABS	6th	Last 16		4 FIBA Europe Cup	RS
2022–23	1	ABS	9th	Last 16		3 FIBA Europe Cup	QR
2023–24	1	ABS	7th	Quarterfinalist			
2024–25	1	ABS	8th	Quarterfinalist			
2025–26	1	ABS	Champion	Runner–up		R European North Basketball League	RS

== Players ==
=== Current roster ===
Note: Flags indicate national team eligibility at FIBA-sanctioned events. Players may hold other non-FIBA nationalities not displayed.

Kapfenberg Bulls roster
Players
Coaches

Pos.	No.	Nat.	Name	Ht.	Age
SG	2	(United States)	Darko-Kelly, Zaccheus	1.98 m (6 ft 6 in)	29 – 3 May 1997
G	5	(United States)	Oglesby, Alec	1.96 m (6 ft 5 in)	25 – 13 September 2001
G	6	(United States)	Wilkinson, Mwani	1.96 m (6 ft 5 in)	24 – 12 August 2002
G/F	7	(Austria)	Heigl, Raphael	1.90 m (6 ft 3 in)	16 – 18 August 2010
F	8	(United States)	Cooper, Jalen	2.01 m (6 ft 7 in)	24 – 11 December 2001
F	11	(Austria)	Grgic, Daniel	2.04 m (6 ft 8 in)	21 – 22 November 2004
SF	12	(Serbia)	Krstić, Nemanja	1.98 m (6 ft 6 in)	33 – 2 March 1993
G	14	(Austria)	Schrittwieser, Tobias	1.86 m (6 ft 1 in)	30 – 14 October 1996
SF	17	(Austria)	Vötsch, David	1.98 m (6 ft 6 in)	25 – 1 October 2001
PG	20	(Austria)	Bajramovic, Mirza	1.86 m (6 ft 1 in)	18 – 7 August 2008
C	41	(Austria)	Koppel, Daniel	2.12 m (6 ft 11 in)	26 – 14 May 2000
PG	45	(Ukraine)	Zotov, Vitaliy	1.87 m (6 ft 2 in)	29 – 3 March 1997
C	48	(Austria)	Vinzce, Zalan	2.08 m (6 ft 10 in)	20 – 28 March 2006
PG	86	(Austria) (United States)	McCaw, Justin	1.88 m (6 ft 2 in)	28 – 12 October 1998
G	–	(United States)	Stanley, Cassius	1.96 m (6 ft 5 in)	27 – 18 August 1999

Head coach

- (Ukraine) Klym Artamanov

Assistant coach(es)

- (Ukraine) Denys Parvadov
- (Austria) Fran Monserrate

Legend

- (C) Team captain
- Injured

- Roster
Updated: October 30, 2026

=== Notable players ===
To appear in this section a player must have either: played at least one season for the club, set a club record or won an individual award while at the club, played at least one official international match for their national team at any time or performed very successfully during period in the club or at later/previous stages of his career.

- (United States) Mark Sanchez (2 seasons: 2012–14)
- (Austria) De'Teri Mayes (2 seasons: 2011–13)
- (Austria) Moritz Lanegger (5 seasons: 2006–11)
- (United States) Quentin Pryor (1 season: 2012–13)
