= Klosterneuburg Dukes =

Professional basketball club in Klosterneuburg, Austria

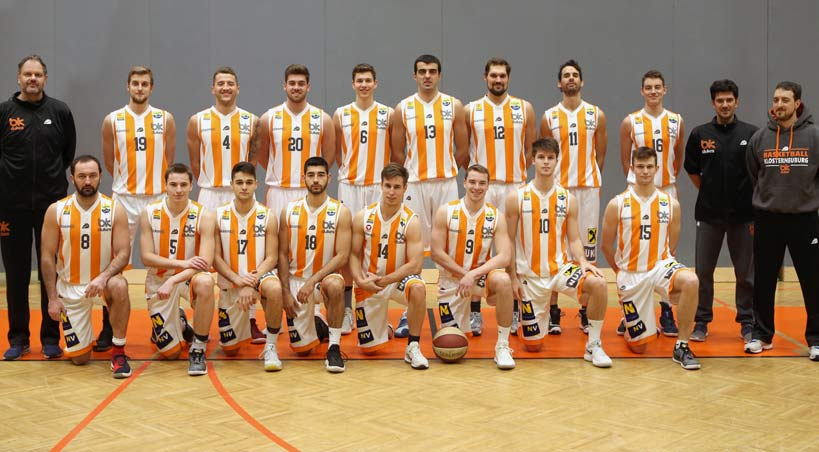
- Klosterneuburg Dukes, 2017-2018
- Leagues: Austrian Basketball Bundesliga
- Founded: 1952
- Arena: Freizeitzentrum Klosterneuburg
- Team colors: Orange, Black, White
- Championships: 10 Austrian Champions; 1978, 1983, 1984, 1985, 1986, 1987, 1988, 1989, 1990, 2012; 1 Austrian Cup; 2013; 2 Austrian Supercups; 2012, 2013
- Website: bk-klosterneuburg.at
Home	Away

Klosterneuburg Dukes is an Austrian professional basketball club based in Klosterneuburg. With a total of 10 national titles, Klosterneuburg is one of the most successful teams in Austria.

== History ==
In 1952, the team was founded as a part of the association football team Klosterneuburg SV. After numerous mergers the team eventually was named Klosterneuburg BC and in 1970, it promoted to the ÖBL, the Austrian First Division.

The 80s were the golden years for the club. They won their first national title in 1978 and from 1983 till 1990 they won the ÖBL 8 times in a row.

In 2012, they were the second team in Austrian basketball history to win the "Title Triple"; they took all the three major trophies (League, Cup and Supercup) that year.

In 2019 the team marked their 50th anniversary in the Basketball Bundesliga.

In 2020 a new sponsorship was agreed with IMMOunited.

== Honours ==
- Austrian Championship (10x)

1978, 1983, 1984, 1985, 1986, 1987, 1988, 1989, 1990, 2012

- Austrian Cup (2x)

2013, 2025

- Austrian Supercup (2x)

2012, 2013

== Season by season ==
Season	Tier	League	Pos.	Austrian Cup	European competitions	
2010–11	1	ÖBL	5th	Round of 16		
2011–12	1	ÖBL	1st			
2012–13	1	ÖBL	3rd	Champion	3 EuroChallenge	QR
2013–14	1	ÖBL	6th	Semifinalist		
2014–15	1	ÖBL	5th	Quarterfinalist		
2015–16	1	ÖBL	6th	Round of 16		
2016–17	1	ÖBL	9th	Round of 16		
2017–18	1	ÖBL	6th	Quarterfinalist		
2018–19	1	ÖBL	4th	Semifinalist		

== Notable players ==
Note: Flags indicate national team eligibility at FIBA-sanctioned events. Players may hold other non-FIBA nationalities not displayed.

Criteria

To appear in this section a player must have either:

- Set a club record or won an individual award while at the club
- Played at least one official international match for their national team at any time
- Played at least one official NBA match at any time.

- (Austria) Moritz Lanegger (2011–present)
