= Traiskirchen Lions =

Professional basketball club in Traiskirchen, Austria

- Leagues: Basketball Superliga; Alpe Adria Cup
- Founded: 1966; 59 years ago
- Arena: Lions Dome
- Capacity: 1,200
- Location: Traiskirchen, Austria
- Team colors: Red, White, Black
- Championships: 3 Austrian Championship; 3 Austrian Cups
- Website: www.basket.at/index.php
Home	Away

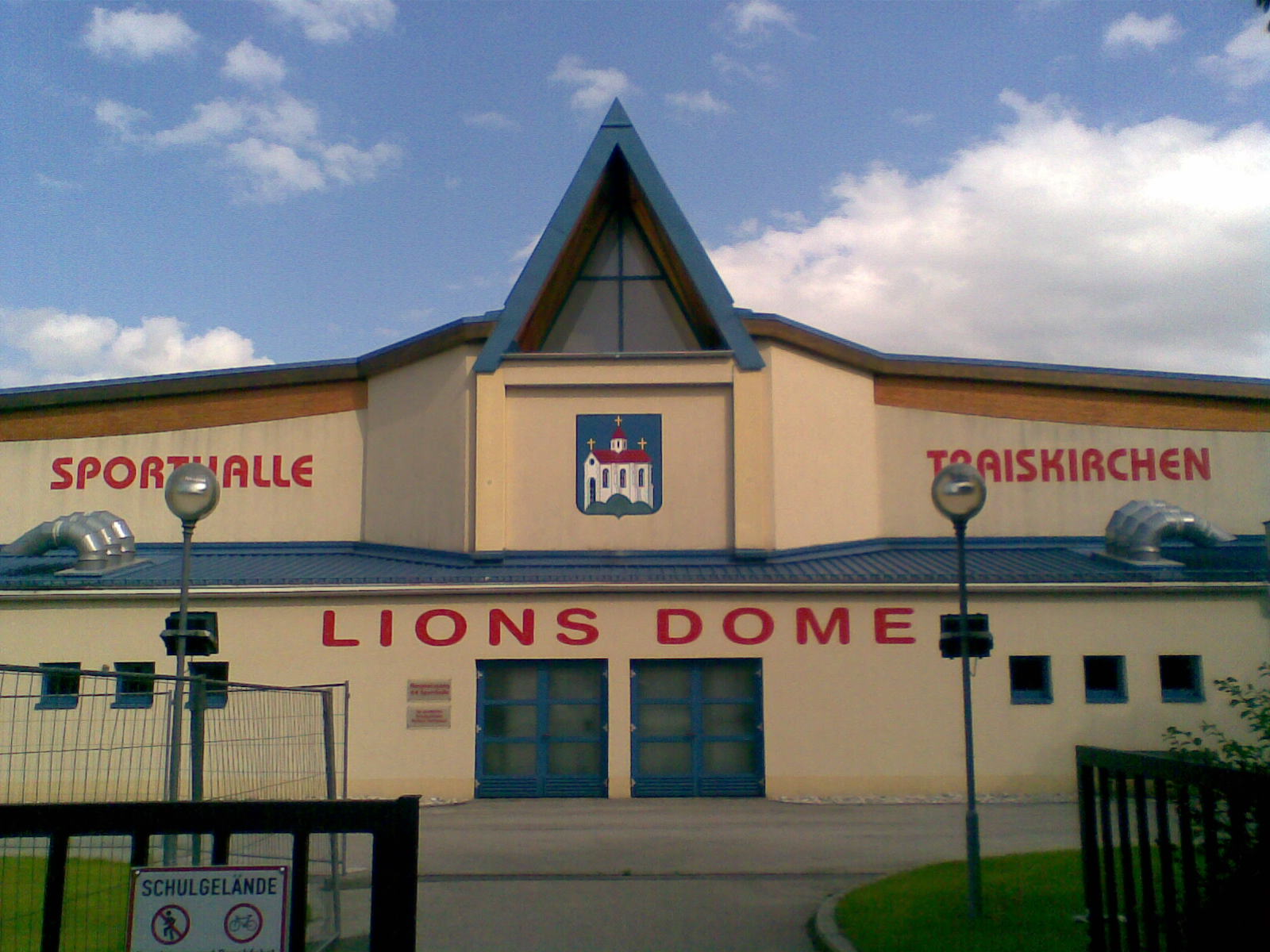
Lions Dome, home arena of the club

Traiskirchen Lions is a professional basketball club based in Traiskirchen, Austria. The team plays in the Austrian Basketball Superliga. It was founded in 1966 and have won the Austrian championships 3 times.

== Trophies ==
- Austrian Championship (3):

1991, 1994, 2000

- Austrian Cups (3):

1997, 2000, 2001

== Logos ==
Until 2013

2013–2018

== Current roster ==
Note: Flags indicate national team eligibility at FIBA-sanctioned events. Players may hold other non-FIBA nationalities not displayed.

Traiskirchen Lions roster
Players
Coaches

Pos.	No.	Nat.	Name
F	4	(Tunisia)	Ismail Chrigui
PG	5	(Austria)	Florian Duck
F	10	(Austria)	Aleksandar Andjelkovic
F	12	(Slovenia)	Matija Radanović
G	14	(Austria)	Kevin Payton
F/C	17	(Bosnia and Herzegovina)	Ramiz Suljanovic
F/C	19	(Bosnia and Herzegovina)	Jozo Brkic

Head coach

(Austria) Zoran Kostic

Assistant coach(es)

(Bosnia and Herzegovina) Ramiz Suljanovic

Legend

- (C) Team captain
- Injured

- Roster
Updated: 8 December 2017

== Notable players ==
Note: Flags indicate national team eligibility at FIBA-sanctioned events. Players may hold other non-FIBA nationalities not displayed.

Criteria

To appear in this section a player must have either:

- Set a club record or won an individual award while at the club
- Played at least one official international match for their national team at any time
- Played at least one official NBA match at any time.

- (Austria) Benedikt Danek
- (Austria) Jakob Pöltl
- (Serbia) Nemanja Bjelica
- (Serbia) Đorđe Drenovac
