= Austrian Cup (basketball) =

- Founded: 1994; 32 years ago
- First season: 1994
- Country: Austria
- Confederation: FIBA Europe
- Current champions: Swans Gmunden (7th title) (2022–23)
- Most championships: Swans Gmunden (7 titles)

The Austrian Cup (German: Österreichischer Cup), for sponsorship reasons known as the Chevrolet Cup, is an annual cup competition for Austrian basketball teams. The competition was introduced in 1994, the Final Four in 1995. Since 1997, a Final Four MVP Award is handed out to the best player in the final phase.

Swans Gmunden is the record holder for most Cup titles, with seven victories.

== Finals ==
Key
Match was won during overtime
Finals were played over two legs

Season	Location	Winner	Score	Finalist	Final Four MVP	Ref.
1994	Sankt Pölten; Traiskirchen	UKJ St. Pölten	104–89; 90–93	UB Möllersdorf	—N/a	
1994–95	Oberwart	Oberwart	71–69	UB Möllersdorf	—N/a	
1995–96	Sankt Pölten	UKJ St. Pölten	62–45	UB Möllersdorf	—N/a	
1996–97	Sankt Pölten	UB Möllersdorf	56–47	UKJ St. Pölten	(United States) Renaldo O'Neal	
1997–98	Wiener Neustadt	UKJ St. Pölten	68–50	Wörthersee Piraten	(United States) Kerry McIntyre	
1998–99	Wiener Neustadt	Oberwart	82–68	Fürstenfeld	(United States) Kenya Capers	
1999–00	Wiener Neustadt	UBM Traiskirchen	87–66	Kapfenberg	(United States) Ron Riley	
2000–01	Wiener Neustadt	UBM Traiskirchen	72–66	Kapfenberg Bulls	(United States) Mike Coffin	
2001–02	Gmunden	Mattersburg 49ers	78–55	Wörthersee Piraten	(Canada) Joey Vickery	
2002–03	Klosterneuburg	Swans Gmunden	98–91	Traiskirchen Lions	(Austria) Matthias Mayer	
2003–04	Oberwart	Swans Gmunden	82–76	Oberwart Gunners	(Austria) De'Teri Mayes	
2004–05	Wels	Oberwart Gunners	81–70	Kapfenberg Bulls	(United States) Jason Detrick	
2005–06	Gmunden	WBC Wels	84–61	Traiskirchen Lions	(United States) Curtis Bobb	
2006–07	Oberwart	Kapfenberg Bulls	83–69	Panthers Fürstenfeld	(United States) Shawn Ray	
2007–08	Fürstenfeld	Swans Gmunden	76–75	Panthers Fürstenfeld	(Austria) De'Teri Mayes	
2008–09	Wels	Panthers Fürstenfeld	80–79	WBC Wels	(United States) Shawn Ray	
2009–10	Oberwart	Swans Gmunden	77–68	Kapfenberg Bulls	(Austria) De'Teri Mayes	
2010–11	Graz	Swans Gmunden	69–64	Panthers Fürstenfeld	(Austria) De'Teri Mayes	
2011–12	Güssing	Swans Gmunden	74–58	Graz	(United States) Sharaud Curry	
2012–13	Oberwart	Xion Dukes Klosterneuburg	72–59	Vienna	(Bosnia and Herzegovina) Damir Zeleznik	
2013–14	Gmunden	Bulls Kapfenberg	74–70	Swans Gmunden	(United States) Mark Sanchez	
2014–15	Schwechat	Oberwart Gunners	90–61	WBC Wels	(Austria) Thomas Klepeisz	
2015–16	Schwechat	Oberwart Gunners	75–62	Vienna	(Lithuania) Adomas Drungilas	
2016–17	Schwechat	Kapfenberg Bulls	77–60	Oberwart Gunners	(Serbia) Bogić Vujošević	
2017–18	Schwechat	Bulls Kapfenberg	82–79	Swans Gmunden		
2018–19	Schwechat	Bulls Kapfenberg	80–70	Swans Gmunden		
2019–20		Bulls Kapfenberg	83–68	Klosterneuburg Dukes		
2020–21	Klosterneuburg	Oberwart Gunners	84–74	Swans Gmunden	(United States) Quincy Diggs	
2021–22	Eisenstadt	BC Vienna	92–70	Oberwart Gunners	(Bosnia and Herzegovina) Adin Vrabac	
2022–23	Oberwart	Swans Gmunden	73–67	Graz	(Austria) Toni Blazan	

== Titles by team ==
Teams in italics are no longer active.

Club	Winners	Runners-up	Seasons won
Swans Gmunden	7	3	2003, 2004, 2008, 2010, 2011, 2012, 2023
Bulls Kapfenberg	6	5	2007, 2017, 2014, 2018, 2019, 2020
Oberwart Gunners	6	3	1995, 1999, 2005, 2015, 2016, 2021
Traiskirchen Lions (Note: Won its titles as "UB Möllersdorf" (1997) and "UBM Traiskirchen" (2000, 2001).)	3	5	1997, 2000, 2001
SKN Sankt Pölten (Note: SKN Sankt Pölten won its titles as "UKJ St. Pölten".)	3	1	1994, 1996, 1998
Flyers Wels (Note: Won its Cup as "WBC Wels".)	1	2	2006
Panthers Fürstenfeld	1	1	2009
Mattersburg 49ers	1	–	2002
Dukes Klosterneuburg	1	–	2013
BC Vienna	1	2	2022
Wörthersee Piraten	–	2	–
Graz	–	2	–
