= Austrian Basketball Bundesliga =

Former top basketball league in Austria

- Founded: 1947; 78 years ago
- First season: 1947–48
- Folded: 2019; 6 years ago
- Replaced by: Basketball Superliga
- Country: Austria
- Confederation: FIBA Europe (Europe)
- Number of teams: 10
- Level on pyramid: 1
- Domestic cup: Austrian Cup
- Supercup: Austrian Supercup
- International cup: FIBA Europe Cup
- Last champions: Kapfenberg Bulls (7th title) (2018–19)
- Most championships: UBSC Wien (11 titles)
- TV partners: Sky Sport
- 2018–19 Austrian Basketball Bundesliga (last before name change)

The Austrian Basketball Bundesliga (in German: Österreichische Basketball Bundesliga) was the top men's professional basketball league in Austria. Until the 2004–05 season, the league was known as the A-Liga (A-League) and then until the 2008–09 season it was called the Österreichische Basketball Bundesliga (ÖBL). From 2008 to 2019, it was named the Admiral Basketball League, after the league's main sponsor, Admiral Sportwetten.

In 2019, the competition was replaced by the Austrian Basketball Superliga.

== Competition format ==
In the current season each team plays the other nine teams four times, creating a 36-game regular-season schedule. After that, the top six teams move on. The two semi-finals winners meet in a best-of-seven championship series.

== Clubs ==
Club	Place	Arena	Capacity
Allianz Swans Gmunden	Gmunden	Volksbank Arena	2,200
Kraftwerk Wels	Wels	Raiffeisen Arena	1,700
Raiffeisen Panthers Fürstenfeld	Fürstenfeld	Stadthalle Fürstenfeld	1,200
Arkadia Traiskirchen Lions	Traiskirchen	Lions Dome	1,200
Kapfenberg Bulls	Kapfenberg	Sporthalle Walfersam	1,000
Zepter Vienna	Wien	Admiral Dome	1,500
Unger Steel Oberwart Gunners	Oberwart	Sporthalle Oberwart	1,700
Xion Dukes Klosterneuburg	Klosterneuburg	Happyland Klosterneuburg	1,000
Raiffeisen Graz	Graz	Raiffeisen Sportpark Graz	3,000

== Title holders ==
- 1946–47 WAC
- 1947–48 Not held
- 1948–49 Admira Wien
- 1949–50 Post Wien
- 1950–51 Wiener Sportclub
- 1951–52 Handelsministerium
- 1952–53 Union Babenberg
- 1953–54 Union Babenberg
- 1954–55 Union Babenberg
- 1955–56 Engelmann Wien
- 1956–57 Union Babenberg
- 1957–58 Engelmann Wien
- 1958–59 Union Babenberg
- 1959–60 Engelmann Wien
- 1960–61 Engelmann Wien
- 1961–62 Engelmann Wien
- 1962–63 Handelsministerium
- 1963–64 Handelsministerium
- 1964–65 Handelsministerium
- 1965–66 Union Kuenring
- 1966–67 Engelmann Wien
- 1967–68 Engelmann Wien
- 1968–69 Engelmann Wien
- 1969–70 Engelmann Wien
- 1970–71 Radio Koch Wien
- 1971–72 Radio Koch Wien
- 1972–73 Wienerberger
- 1973–74 Wienerberger
- 1974–75 Sefra Wien
- 1975–76 Sefra Wien
- 1976–77 Shopping Centre Wien
- 1977–78 Klosterneuburg
- 1978–79 UBSC Wien
- 1979–80 UBSC Wien
- 1980–81 UBSC Wien
- 1981–82 UBSC Wien
- 1982–83 Klosterneuburg
- 1983–84 Klosterneuburg
- 1984–85 Klosterneuburg
- 1985–86 Klosterneuburg
- 1986–87 Klosterneuburg
- 1987–88 Klosterneuburg
- 1988–89 Klosterneuburg
- 1989–90 Klosterneuburg
- 1990–91 Möllersdorf
- 1991–92 Union SPI
- 1992–93 UBC Sankt Pölten
- 1993–94 Möllersdorf
- 1994–95 UBC Sankt Pölten
- 1995–96 UBC Sankt Pölten
- 1996–97 UBC Sankt Pölten
- 1997–98 UBC Sankt Pölten
- 1998–99 UBC Sankt Pölten
- 1999–00 Traiskirchen Lions
- 2000–01 Kapfenberg Bulls
- 2001–02 Kapfenberg Bulls
- 2002–03 Kapfenberg Bulls
- 2003–04 Kapfenberg Bulls
- 2004–05 Swans Gmunden
- 2005–06 Swans Gmunden
- 2006–07 Swans Gmunden
- 2007–08 Panthers Fürstenfeld
- 2008–09 Kraftwerk Wels
- 2009–10 Swans Gmunden
- 2010–11 Oberwart Gunners
- 2011–12 Xion Dukes Klosterneuburg
- 2012–13 Zepter Vienna
- 2013–14 Güssing Knights
- 2014–15 Güssing Knights
- 2015–16 Redwell Oberwart Gunners
- 2016–17 ece Bulls Kapfenberg
- 2017–18 ece Bulls Kapfenberg
- 2018–19 ece Bulls Kapfenberg

== Finals ==
Season	Champion	Result	Runners-up	Champions' coach	Finals MVP
2000–01	Kapfenberg Bulls	3–2	Wörthersee Piraten		—
2001–02	Kapfenberg Bulls	3–2	Panthers Fürstenfeld		—
2002–03	Kapfenberg Bulls	3–2	Swans Gmunden		—
2003–04	Kapfenberg Bulls	3–1	Swans Gmunden		—
2004–05	Swans Gmunden	3–0	Oberwart Gunners	(United States) Bob Gonnen	—
2005–06	Swans Gmunden	3–0	Kraftwerk Wels	(United States) Bob Gonnen	(Austria) Peter Hütter
2006–07	Swans Gmunden	3–0	Oberwart Gunners	(United States) Bob Gonnen	(Austria) De'Teri Mayes
2007–08	Panthers Fürstenfeld	3–2	Oberwart Gunners	(United States) Aaron Mitchell	(United States) Anthony Shavies
2008–09	Kraftwerk Wels	3–1	Swans Gmunden	(Austria) Raoul Korner	(United States) Ricky Moore
2009–10	Swans Gmunden	3–2	Panthers Fürstenfeld	(Austria) Matthias Fischer	(Austria) De'Teri Mayes
2010–11	Oberwart Gunners	3–2	Swans Gmunden	(Austria) Neno Ašćerić	(Austria) Bernd Volcic
2011–12	Dukes Klosterneuburg	3–1	Swans Gmunden	(Austria) Werner Sallomon	(Austria) Christoph Nagler
2012–13	Zepter Vienna	3–2	Oberwart Gunners	(Italy) Andrea Maghelli	(United States) Shawn Ray
2013–14	Güssing Knights	3–2	Kapfenberg Bulls	(Germany) Matthias Zollner	(United States) Anthony Shavies
2014–15	Güssing Knights	3–1	Zepter Vienna	(Germany) Matthias Zollner	(United States) Travis Taylor
2015–16	Redwell Oberwart Gunners	3–0	WBC Raiffeissen Wels	(Greece) Chris Chougaz	(United States) Chris McNealy
2016–17	ece Bulls Kapfenberg	4–1	Redwell Oberwart Gunners	(Austria) Michael Schrittwieser	(Serbia) Bogić Vujošević
2017–18	ece Bulls Kapfenberg	4–2	Swans Gmunden		
2018–19	ece Bulls Kapfenberg	3–0	Swans Gmunden		

== Awards ==
- Most Valuable Player
- Finals MVP
- Coach of the Year
- Most Valuable Austrian Player

== All-Star Game ==
The ÖBL held an annual all-star game, pitting a team of the best Austrian players in the league against a team made up of the league's top international players. Like the NBA All-Star Game, the ÖBL All-Star festivities included a slam dunk contest and a three-point shooting competition.
