= Tribuswinkel =

Town in Lower Austria, Austria

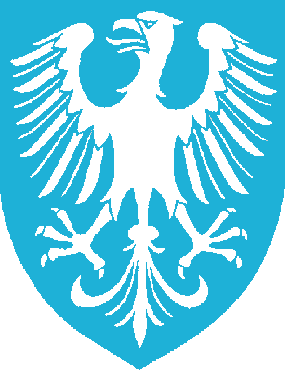
- Coat of arms

- Location within Austria
- Coordinates: 48°0′N 16°16′E
- Country: Austria
- State: Lower Austria
- District: Baden

Government
  - Mayor: Andreas Babler (SPÖ)

Area
  - Total: 6.92 km^{2} (2.67 sq mi)
- Elevation: 215 m (705 ft)

Population (28 February 2023)
  - Total: 4,295
  - Density: 621/km^{2} (1,610/sq mi)
- Time zone: UTC+1 (CET)
  - Summer (DST): UTC+2 (CEST)
- Postal code: 2512
- Area code: 02252
- Website: www.tribuswinkel.at

Tribuswinkel is a town and cadastral community in the district of Baden in Lower Austria in northeast Austria. Since 1972, it is part of the Municipality of Traiskirchen.

== History ==
The oldest historical mention of Tribuswinkel is from the 12th century with a mention of "Jubort de Tribanswinchele" in 1136 in the founding charter of the Heiligenkreuz Abbey.

In 1251, a watermill, running along the Badener Mühlbach (mill river) is mentioned and from the middle ages up until the 19th century, there were at least 4 mills in Tribuswinkel.

1359, Wolfgang von Winden bought the town of Tribuswinkel. The family von Winden owned Tribuswinkel until 1516. In 1365, Wolfgang von Winden commissioned the construction of a small church and the parish of Tribuswinkel was founded in 1368.

Following the death of the Family von Winden, in 1590, the viennese businessman Georg Federl bought Tribuswinkel.

Since the 16th century, a sheep farm was settled on the outskirts of Tribuswinkel, which carries its name to this day, the Schafflerhof-Siedling, translating into sheep farm settlement. It is said that around 1,000 sheep were kept in the settlement.

A series of fires in the 19th century gave rise to the foundation of the voluntary fire brigade of Tribuswinkel.

Following the end of the Second World War in 1945, soviet troops formed the first provisional town government with Karl Bartmann as the new town mayor.

== Culture and sights ==
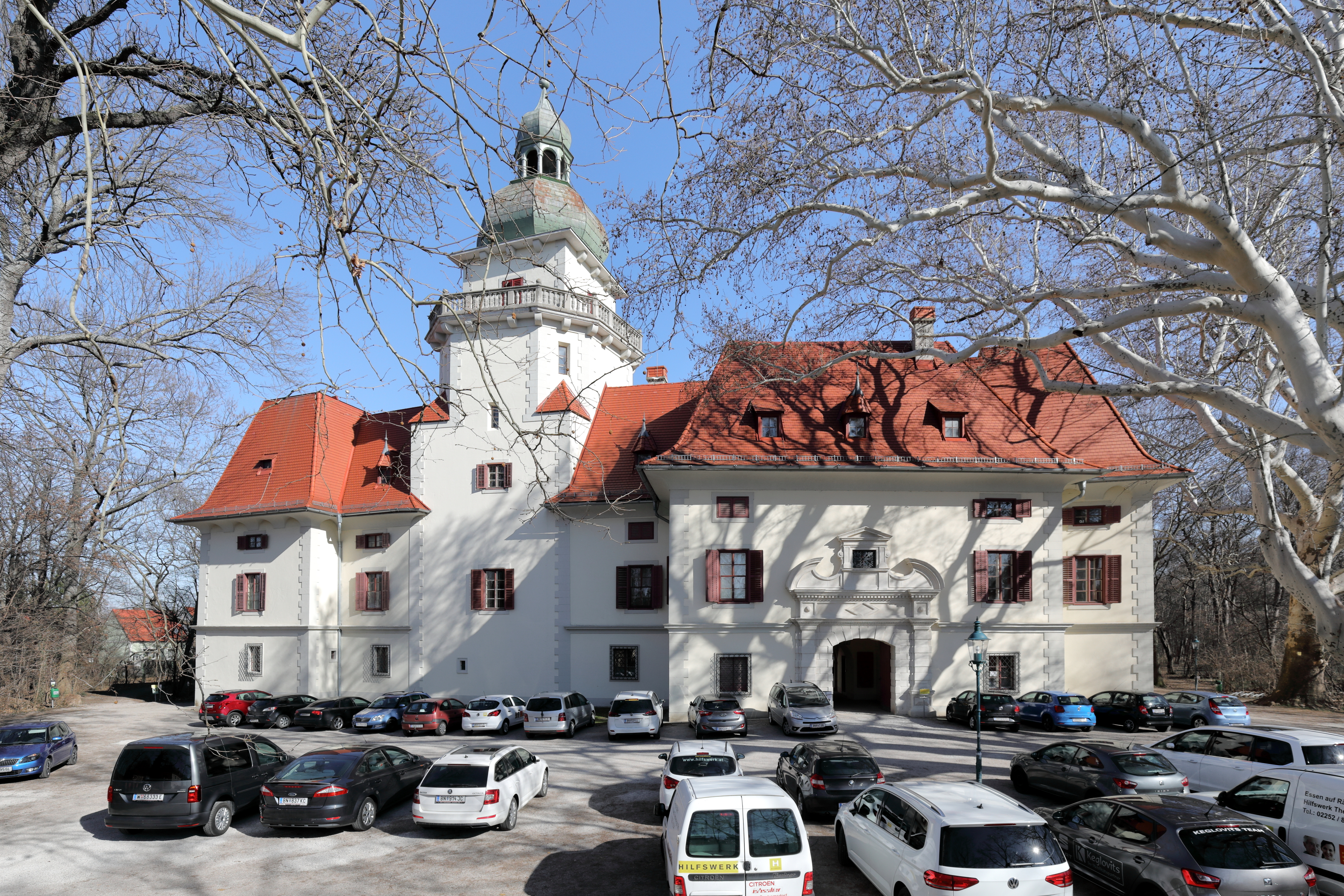
Castle of Tribuswinkel

=== Castle of Tribuswinkel ===
The founding is dated 1136, but earlier resourcers refer to 1120.

The weir would probably have been built as surrounding water castle around 1120-1230. The wall surrounding the castle and the moult do not existing anymore.

Today, the castle is owned by the municipality of Traiskirchen and is used as a bed and breakfast and a Heuriger.

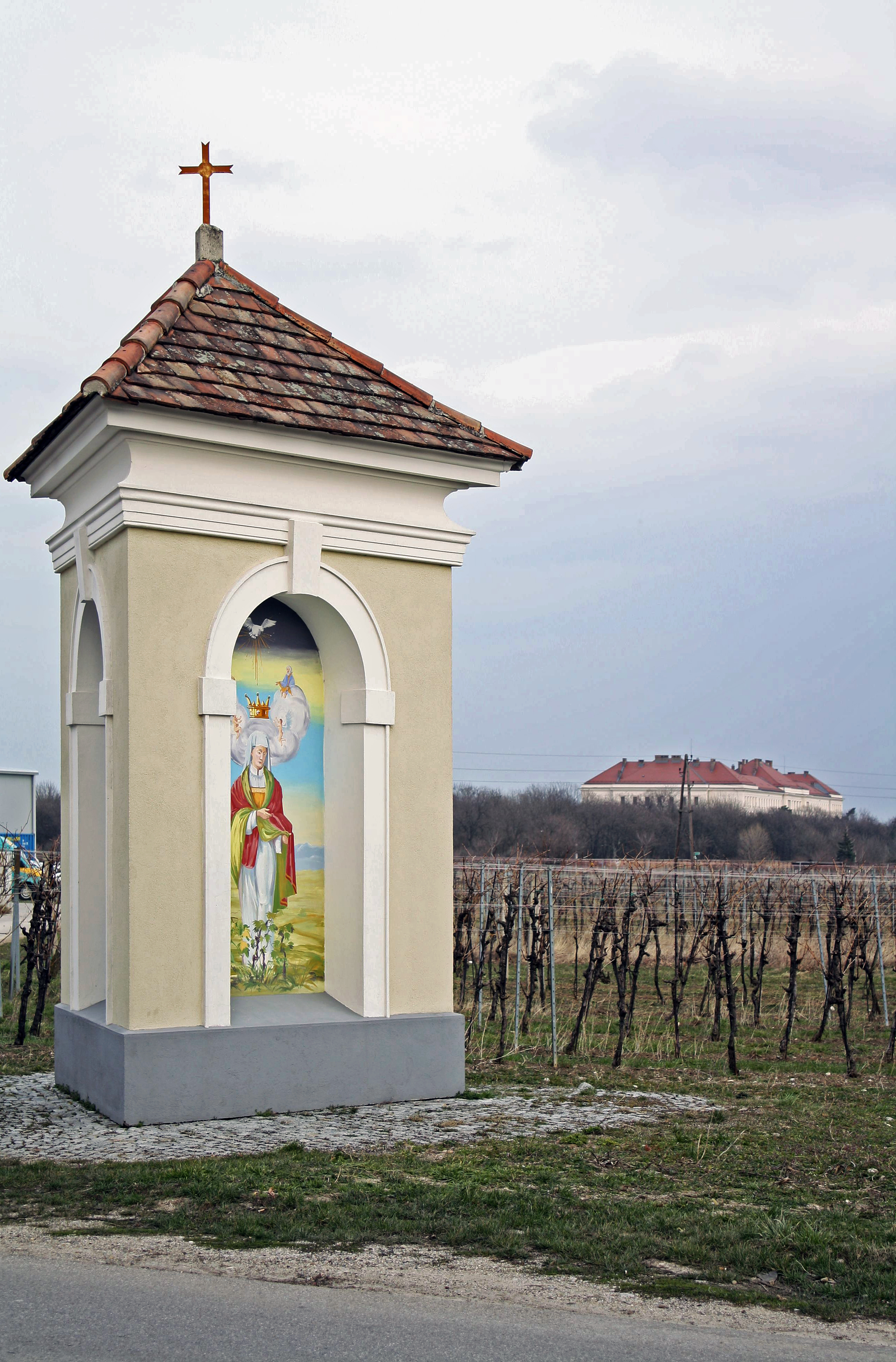
Three-sided column shrine from the 18th century, rebuilt in 1987, located at the town border between Tribuswinkel and Pfaffstätten

==== Dreieckiges Kreuz ====
A three-sided brick column shrine with round-arched niches on each side. The shrine stands at the northern town border between Tribuswinkel and Pfaffstätten. The shrine is interchangably called the Templarkreuz transl. Knights Templar cross, Drei-Markt-Kapelle transl. three-market-chapel, or Kreuzritterkapelle transl. Knights Templar chapel. The structure dates back to the 18th century. The original structure was removed in 1987 to alter the path of the adjacent road. It was subsequently rebuilt by the local population according to plans and images of the old shrine. The interiors of the niches are decorated with wall paintings depicting the crucifixion and a praying Knights Templar, a dark-haired Knights Templar castles in the background, and a white-haired Knights Templar with a church landscape in the background. According to oral lore the three knights depictured were called Guntram, Gumpold, and Triban, after which the three towns of Guntramsdorf, Gumpoldskirchen and Tribuswinkel are named, who are said to have bid their goodbyes at the location of the shrine to each other, parting into three different directions, as does the intersection the shrine is located at. The artifacts are inscribed with "Robert Colnago" (born 1935, Vienna).

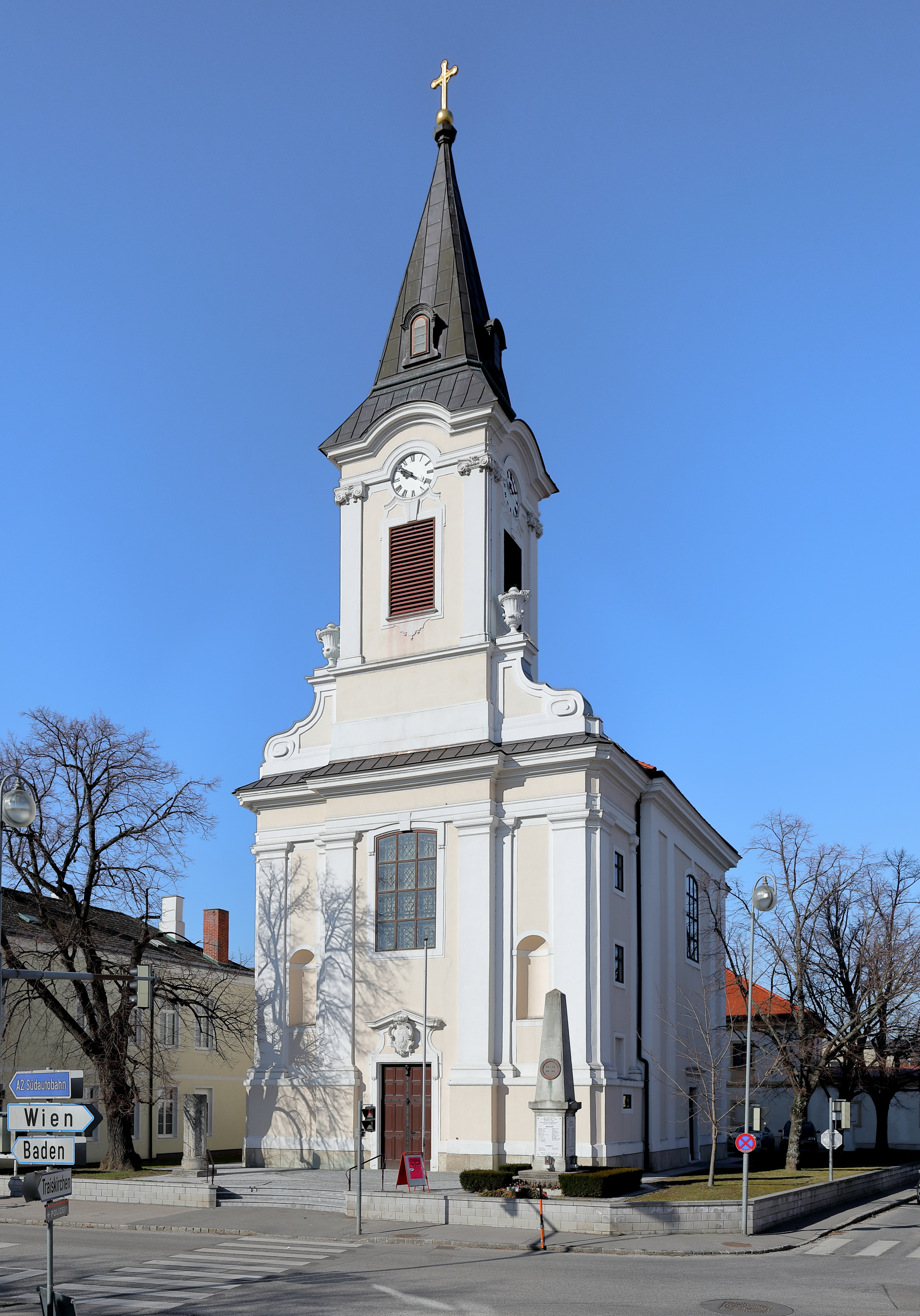
Parish church Tribuswinkel

=== Parish church Tribuswinkel ===
The Roman Catholic parish church was built between 1730 and 1732, following plans by the architect Anton Erhard Martinelli. Originally the roof was an onion dome, but following a fire in 1879, was replaced by a pyramid roof. As a historic building, the building is protected as a cultural heritage site. The church is under the patronage of Wolfgang of Regensburg.

== Traffic and infrastructure ==
=== Traffic ===
Tribuswinkel sits alongside highway A2, the Süd Autobahn at the exit Baden. The Triester Straße also runs along the town and was one of the historically most important cities connecting Vienna to the north of Italy.

Tribuswinkel also has a rail connection to Vienna on the Badener Bahn.

=== Local businesses ===
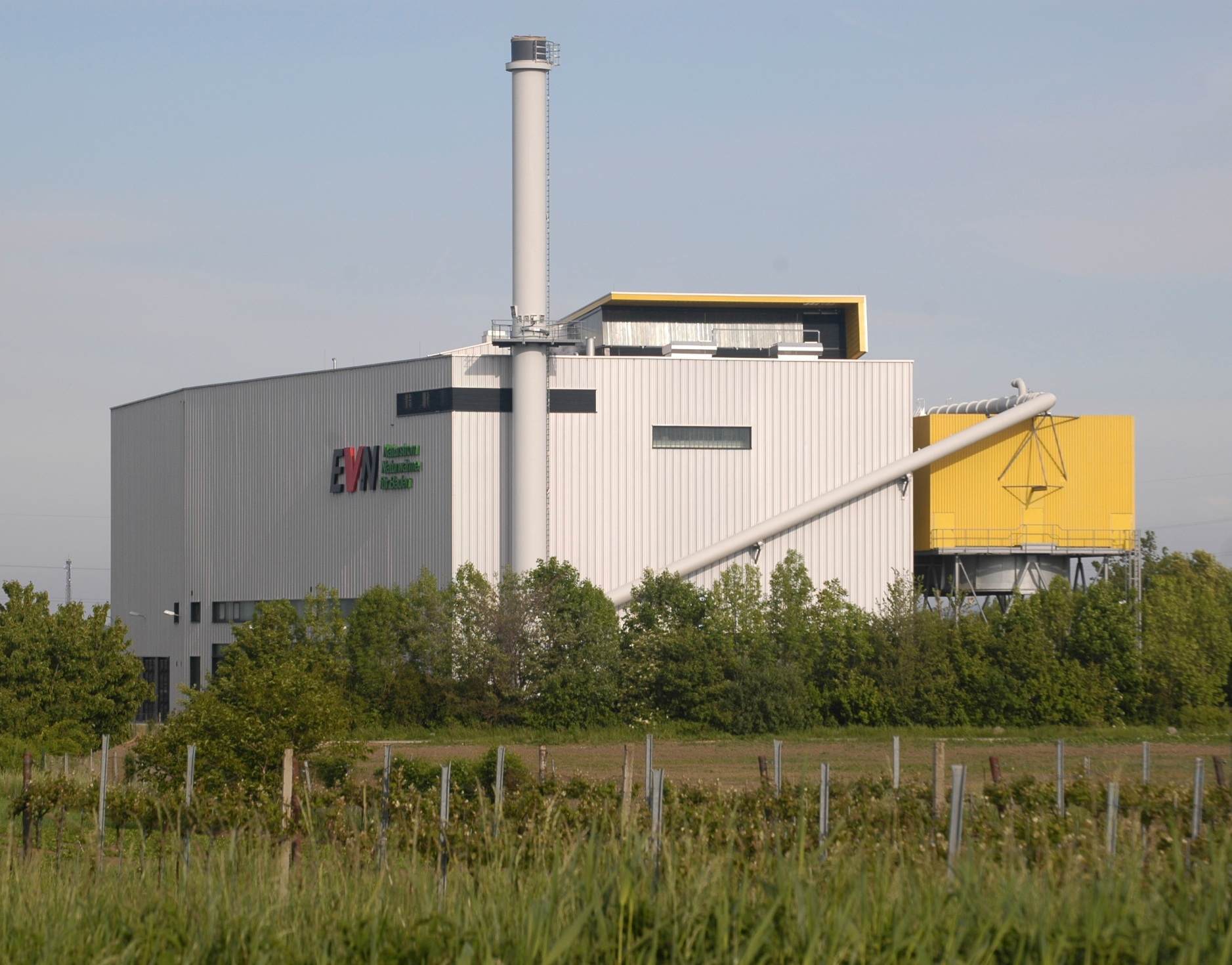
Biomass energy plant Baden

In the turn of the 19th century, the town transformed from that of a pure farming town, to that of industry. In 1909, the company Scheuble und Hofstätter built a chemical-pharmaceutical factory along the Wiener Neustadt Canal that runs along the town. During the First World War, the factory was used to produce jam and following the end of the war, was converted to produce textiles.

In 1950, in the south of Tribuswinkel, the EVN Group built a bioenergy plant.

=== Public services ===
- 2 Kindergarten
- 1 Bank
- 1 Primary school
- 1 Music school
- 1 Highway patrol office
- 1 Fire brigade

== Literature ==
There are various history books about Tribuswinkel (in German):

- Geschichte und Gschichterln aus Tribuswinkel. Pro Tribus Dorferneuerung, Arbeitsgruppe Geschichte, Tribuswinkel 2012.
- Alexandra Ebert: Schlosspark Tribuswinkel. Diplomarbeit, Universität für Bodenkultur, Wien 2008. – Volltext online (PDF).
- Tribuswinkel einst und jetzt. Eine Zeitreise in Bildern durch 100 Jahre Ortsentwicklung. Pro Tribus Dorferneuerung, Arbeitsgruppe Geschichte, Tribuswinkel 2009.
- Stefan Babler: Gewässer in Tribuswinkel. Lebensadern unseres Ortes. Pro Tribus Dorferneuerung, Arbeitsgruppe Geschichte, Tribuswinkel 2006.
- Kirche und Pfarrleben in Tribuswinkel. Zwei Bände. Pro Tribus Dorferneuerung, Arbeitsgruppe Geschichte, Tribuswinkel 2002.
- Das Vereins- und Gesellschaftsleben in Tribuswinkel. Pro Tribus Dorferneuerung, Arbeitsgruppe Geschichte, Tribuswinkel 2002.
- Tribuswinkel, vom Bauerndorf zum Industrieort. Zwei Bände. Pro Tribus Dorferneuerung, Arbeitsgruppe Geschichte, Tribuswinkel 1998.
- Schloß Tribuswinkel. Von den Anfängen bis in die Gegenwart. Pro Tribus Dorferneuerung, Arbeitsgruppe Geschichte, Tribuswinkel 1994.
- Kurt Drescher: Die ehemaligen Badener Mühlen. Eine Zusammenfassung der bekannten Fakten über den Badener Mühlbach, die Badener Müllerzunft, deren vorhandenen (sic!) Urkunden und der Mühlen am Mühlbach und am Wr. Neustädter Kanal. Drescher, Baden 1990.
