= Otto Vogl =

American chemist and polymer scientist

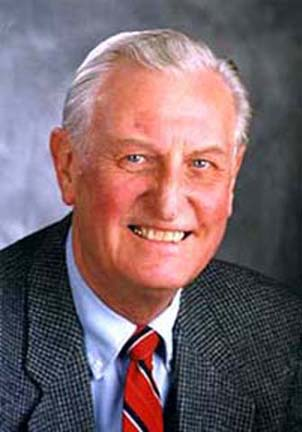
- Otto Vogl, circa 2000
- Born: November 6, 1927; Traiskirchen, Austria
- Died: April 27, 2013 (aged 85)
- Scientific career
- Fields: Polymer Science
- Workplaces: University of Vienna, University of Massachusetts Amherst, Polytechnic University, Brooklyn

Otto Vogl (November 6, 1927 – April 27, 2013) was an American chemist, polymer scientist, and educator.

== Life and work ==
Otto Vogl was the Herman F. Mark Professor Emeritus of the Polytechnic Institute of New York University, and Professor Emeritus of the University of Massachusetts Amherst. He is noted for his work on the polymerization of higher aldehydes and the importance of the ceiling temperature of polymerization, His other contributions were in functional polymers, polymeric drugs, polymeric stabilizers, macromolecular asymmetry, the single helix, chirality and chiral crystallization, and the chemistry of oriental lacquers. Vogl was the chairman of the American Chemical Society Division of Polymer Chemistry and the president of the Pacific Polymer Federation. He was a foreign member of the Royal Swedish Academy of Sciences. He was on the editorial board of many polymer related journals and was for years the editor-in-chief of Progress in Polymer Science, the international review journal.

Vogl was born in Traiskirchen, Austria, near Vienna. He attended the local elementary school and the Realgymnasium in Baden bei Wien. In 1945, Vogl began his studies in chemistry at the University of Vienna. His doctoral thesis, on steroids, was carried out under the guidance of Professor Friedrich Galinovsky. He obtained his PhD in April 1950.

In October 1948, Vogl was appointed an instructor at the II. Chemical Institute of the University of Vienna. He left for the United States in 1953. He spent three years as a postdoctoral research associate at the University of Michigan (1953–1955) and Princeton University (1955–1956). He spent the years 1956-1970 at E. I. du Pont de Nemours & Co.

In 1970, Vogl was appointed professor in the new program of polymer science and engineering at the University of Massachusetts Amherst. At the beginning of 1983, he accepted the newly created position of Herman F. Mark Chair of Polymer Science at Polytechnic University. In 1996 he retired, and returned to the University of Massachusetts.

In addition to his scientific activities, Vogl was a dedicated philatelist. He had a considerable collection of stamps, mainly from Austria and Japan. His Austrian collection provided a link to his native country. The Austrian Philatelic Magazine Die Briefmarke dedicated a voluminous article to Prof. Vogl in 2008. The City Museum Traiskirchen ordered a special edition of stamps from the Austrian post office with Vogl's picture on it; the edition was only produced in 200 pieces. Also, his strong interests in the arts(he collaborated with the Metropolitan Museum in New York) may have helped to create the notion of a radiant uniqueness that turns persons into personalities.

Vogl died at home in Amherst, Massachusetts, on April 27, 2013, and was buried in Wildwood Cemetery. He was survived by his wife Jane C. Vogl, their son Eric Vogl of Houston, Texas, and their daughter Yvonne of New York, as well as by eight grandchildren, including Fariss Jane Marsh, one great-granddaughter, and one great grandson.

Otto Vogl was a pioneer in polymer science who contributed to its vitality. He also served as an ambassador for polymer science and made connections with other scientists, promoting an international exchange of ideas and approaches.

== Publications ==
Otto Vogl published his extensive scientific research in a number of professional journals, among them the Journal of the American Chemical Society, the Journal of Polymer Science Part A, the Journal of Macromolecular Science and some science-related articles in Polymer News, the polymer science monthly. He was on many editorial boards and was for many years editor-in-chief of Progress in Polymer Science.

== Honors and awards ==
=== Membership in academies of sciences ===
Academy of Sciences, Austria
New York Academy of Sciences
Berlin-Brandenburgische Academy of Sciences, Berlin, Germany (1985–92)
The Royal Swedish Academy of Sciences, Stockholm, Sweden

=== Honorary doctoral degrees ===
1983 Dr. rer. nat., honoris causa, University of Jena, Germany
1992 Dr. honoris causa, Polytechnic Institute of Iasi, Romania
1996 Dr. honoris causa, Osaka University, Japan,
2000 Golden Dr. Phil, University of Vienna
2001 Dr. Sc. honoris causa. Academy of Sciences, Slovak Republic
2005 Dr. mountain. Science, honoris causa, University of Leoben, Austria

=== Honorary memberships in societies ===
1993 Slovak Chemical Society, Bratislava, Slovak Republic,
1996 Society of Plastics and Rubber Engineers, Zagreb, Croatia
1999 Austrian Chemical Society, Vienna, Austria
2004 Society of Polymer Science, Japan

=== Guest professorships ===
1971, 2000 Royal Institute of Technology, Sweden, Department of Polymer Technology
1973 University of Freiburg, Germany, Institute of Macromolecular Chemistry
1982 Technical University Dresden, Germany, Department of Chemistry
1984 Wuhan University, Wuhan, China
1984 East China Normal University, Shanghai, China
1996 Monbusho Professor, Kyoto Institute of Technology

=== Awards ===
- Fulbright Fellowship (1976)
- Humboldt Prize, Germany (1977)
- Senior Scientist Fellowship, JSPS, Japan (1980)
- Chemical Pioneer Award, AIC (1985)
- Distinguished Service Award, ACS, Division of Polymer Chemistry (1985)
- ACS Award in Applied Polymer Chemistry (1990)
- Distinguished Award of the Society of Polymer Science, Japan (1991).
- H. Coanda Medal, I. Class, Society of Inventors, Romania (1993)
- Life Member, SPSJ, Japan (1993)
- Distinguished Service Award, Pacific Polymer Federation (1993)
- ACS Division of Polymer Chemistry, Mark Award (2000)
- Kulturpreis, City of Traiskirchen (2002)

=== Medals ===
- Honorary Cross for Arts and Sciences, Republic of Austria (2000)
- Gold Medal of the City of Vienna (1986)
- Medal of the City of Iasi, Romania (1972)
- Doebereiner Medal, University of Jena (1985)
- Medal of the University of Helsinki, Finland (1987).
- Wilhelm Exner Medal, Austrian Trade Association (1987).
- Medal of Texas A&M University (1988);
- Mark Medal, Austrian Research Institute for Chemistry and Physics (1989)
- Golden Ring of Honor, City of Traiskirchen (1989)
- Honorary Medal, Slovak Academy of Sciences, Polymer Institute (2003)
- Medal, Slovak Chemical Society (2007)
- Citation, Austrian Industry (OMV) 2007
- Plaque, ACS Division of Polymer Chemistry commemorating his 80th birthday and 40 years of service to the Division (2007)
- Honorary Medal for Chemistry in Austria (2008)
- Distinguished Honorary Alumni Award 2010

== Professional activities ==
=== Professional societies ===
Early in his scientific career, Otto Vogl showed his interest and commitment to professional organizations. As a student he joined the Austrian Chemical Society on 15 May 1948 and attended his first national meeting later in the year in Linz, where he heard Giulio Natta as the plenary lecturer. He attended the first international meeting in 1950 in Graz.

In the US he joined the American Chemical Society (ACS) in 1954, attended his first national meeting (the 125th) there in Kansas City, and presented his first lecture, which was on alkaloids. For the rest of his career, he was committed to serve the ACS and its Division of Polymer Chemistry in various capacities. He was the chairman of the Polymer Division and the chairman of the Connecticut Valley Section in 1974.

He began as the treasurer of the Polymer Division of the Delaware Section in 1967 and became the chairman of the Awards Committee of the section the year later.

In 1985 Vogl obtained the Chemical Pioneer Award of the American Institute of Chemists (with Alan Hay) and became thereafter the chairman of the Awards Committee. After two years he was asked to run for the presidency of AICh. He lost by a very narrow margin.

=== ACS Division of Polymer Chemistry ===
In 1967, Chairman-Elect Jack Elliott of the ACS Division of Polymer Chemistry (POLY) invited him to attend the executive committee meeting as a guest and Vogl was appointed as a member of the Program Committee. The next year the newly appointed chairman of the Membership Committee Jesse Hwa appointed him as the subcommittee chairman for International Membership. In this capacity Vogl increased the membership from 180 to 520.

When the position of the treasurer became available, the chairman Elliott appointed Vogl treasurer. He was later elected for a second term. Vogl reorganized the treasury and controlled spending and administration. During this period, the incorporation of the Polymer Division was also accomplished.

At Elliott's initiative and with the support of Jesse Hwa and Otto Vogl, they devised what is now known the grid system of administering the growing division. This group, which Vogl called the triumvirate, provided for 8 years much vision and leadership and transformed the informal working group in the early era of the division into a modern functioning organization. It was based on a close personal and working relationship among the three members.

In 1967, Vogl had proposed to Chairman-Elect Elliott to establish a carefully planned network of cooperation of POLY with (a) polymer interested Divisions of the ACS. (b) polymer organizations in the US, and (c) international organizations in the polymer field, wherein (a) led to the ACS Macromolecular Secretariat on Polymers and (c) led to the Pacific Polymer Federation, as well as to interactions with other polymer-related organizations in Europe.

The Secretariat for Macromolecules, later abbreviated to Macromolecular Secretariat, was formed by POLY with 4 other ACS Divisions under Elliott's expertise, connections and skills, with Vogl on his side. Currently, the ACS has nearly 20 Secretariats of cooperation. Elliott became the first general secretary in 1974 and Vogl the third. The international activities of the division required the formation of a formal establishment.

Among the major achievements of his chairmanship, Vogl established the Awards Committee and the Archives Committee (which published the 25 Years of POLY history, later called the Historic Committee), and had the divisional stationery redesigned.

== International activities ==
The other notable achievement was the creation of the Foreign Affairs Committee, which was headed by Vogl until 1990. The committee achieved agreements of cooperation with some European polymer organizations, such as those from Italy, France, Sweden and Germany.

In the Pacific Basin area, the first step for some formal cooperation was the treaty between POLY and the Society of Polymer Science of Japan (Kambara and Vogl) in 1974. Two joint conferences were held: one adjacent to the ACS meeting in Palm Springs in 1979 (Tsuruta and Bailey) and one in Kyoto (Vogl and Saegusa). It became clear that purely bilateral meetings were too time consuming and a new concept had to be developed.

The next major visible achievement was the formation of Pacific Polymer Federation (PPF). After several years, starting from 1984, devoted to inception, preliminary discussions, and internal approvals from each society, PPF was formally formed in 1987 by three founding organizations: POLY, the Society of Polymer Science (Japan), and the Polymer Division of Royal Australian Chemical Institute. Two representatives of the founding organizations formed the PPF Council, with Vogl as its first president. This was a very prestigious achievement for POLY and an acknowledgment of Vogl's leadership. In 1989, five new members from polymer organizations of Canada, South Korea, Malaysia, New Zealand, and the People's Republic of China were added to the council. The first major activity of the PPF was the first and very successful Pacific Polymer Conference held in Maui, Hawaii in December 1989. In all these international and intersocietal activities, Vogl functioned as a de facto foreign minister managing the foreign affairs of POLY.

== Conferences ==
From his early activities, he was interested in attending and participating in conferences, in local, regional, national, then international symposia. In his period in the Delaware Section he served as vice chairman for the MARM Conference in 1968.

During his stay in Japan in 1968 he started to create (with Furukawa) the US-Japan Symposia on Polymer Chemistry. The first was held in Hakone in 1972 with Furukawa and Vogl as co-chairmen. The conferences continued at three-year intervals, in Pingree Park, Colorado; Osaka, Japan; Napa California; Tokyo, Japan; Sonoma, California; and Sendai, Japan. He also created the US-Romania Conferences with C.I. Simionescu; first in Iasi in 1976 conferences and then in Bucharest in 1983. He was also responsible (with Penczek) for the beginning of the Symposia on Ring-Opening Polymerization, first held in Jablona, Poland.

Vogl was also involved in the organization of the Conferences on Cationic Polymerization. He acted as secretary for the meetings in Akron 1976; Ghent, Belgium; Jena, Germany; Budafok, Hungary; and Borovice, Bulgaria. He guided the combination of these conferences to the formation of one single symposium: the Ionic Conferences (a combination of Cationic, Ring-opening and the spawning Anionic Conference). The first was held in Istanbul (1994), followed by Paris (1997).

== Educational contributions ==
=== At the University of Massachusetts ===
Underscoring his commitment to research, Vogl maintained a deep and long-standing commitment to the importance of polymer science education. Starting with his academic career at the University of Massachusetts Amherst (after his early academic experience as instructor at the University of Vienna), Vogl promptly developed introductory courses in polymer chemistry, including preparatory laboratory exercises, along with advanced subjects such as studies in the degradation and stabilization of synthetic polymers and/or applied spectroscopy of synthetic polymers. As polymer science was at this point in the 1970s considered a sort of hybrid discipline without the more formal academic consideration provided to classical chemistry programs, there were few if any appropriate textbooks, adding to the task. Vogl also assumed responsibility as the graduate program coordinator for the Polymer Science Program, overlooking the development of the student body, and in 1973, Vogl was integral in promoting the acceptance of the Polymer Science Program at the University of Massachusetts Amherst as an exclusive graduate department, which to this day remains relatively unique in the world of higher education.

Over the years, Vogl's lectures, either at the introductory or more advanced level, adopted the more basic and effective characteristics of a “chalk talk” where he lectured from memory, and where students grew accustomed to listen, copy from the blackboard, transcribe their notes and review/study. In short, Vogl did not believe in offering students brief information and instructing them to “work it out.” Over the years, Vogl's efforts led to the graduation of 25 students at the doctoral level, overall over 100 co-workers, while actively collaborating with numerous visiting scholars and supervising a number of post-doctoral researchers.

In addition, Vogl's academic research group structure was designed such that there were always, in general, a variety of different projects at issue. Vogl's idea and objective was to select subjects of different varieties and by working within such multi-disciplinary areas, Vogl would ultimately have his group understand the nature of polymer chemistry problems from several vantage points. In short, Vogl elected not to work on details of research questions that could become obsolete, and Vogl's view of research together with educational considerations informed such perspective throughout his academic career.

=== In Brooklyn and abroad ===
Vogl's educational commitment ultimately extended to his tenure at Brooklyn Polytechnic University when appointed to the Mark Chair, (the first endowed name-chair in Polymer Science). In 1983, during his first year at Brooklyn, Vogl did not miss a step and promptly continued with the introductory courses and advanced courses he had developed in Amherst. In addition, Vogl's dedication to polymer education extended to his worldwide visiting scholarly appointments at the Royal Institute of Technology, Sweden, Louis Pasteur University, Strasbourg, France, (where he took his only sabbatical leave); Kyoto University, Japan; Osaka University, Japan; Kyoto Institute of Technology, Japan; Universität Freiburg, Germany; Freie Universität Berlin; Technische Universität Dresden; Technical University, Warsaw; Wuhan University, China; and East China University, Shanghai.

== Activities abroad ==
=== Central and Eastern Europe ===
Otto Vogl made great contributions to international cooperation of polymer scientists. He has a close connection with the Russian Academy of Sciences. In the period from 1970 to 1990 he was visiting professor and gave lectures at the Institute of Chemical Physics, Institute of Petrochemical Synthesis (Topchiev Institute), Institute of Elemental Organic Compounds, Institute of Macromolecular Chemistry (St. Petersburg), Institute of Organic Chemistry in Riga, Moscow State University. He had cooperation with polymer scientists of Japan (Kyoto, Osaka, Kyushu, Tokyo), China (Beijing, Shanghai, Wuhan), Australia (Brisbane, Melbourne)), Germany (Freiburg, Berlin, Dresden, Jena), Romania (Iasi)), Slovakia (Institute of Polymer Chemistry), Poland (Warsaw, Lodz), Slovak Academy of Sciences, Croatia (Zagreb)) Austria (Graz, Vienna, Leoben) and other countries.

Otto Vogl's fluency in German, English, French and Italian and his knowledge of Japanese, Russian and Hungarian certainly helped to sustain his outreach to the international community in the field of Polymer Sciences Particularly, he succeeds to establish a strong bridge between western and eastern so called socialistic countries, promoting the interaction between their polymer scientists and polymer science organization of particular country. This was the case with Croatia. Prof. Vogl was visiting Zagreb several times at the time to discuss current problems in polymer research and future trends with the scientists at the university and other institutions. His contribution and encouragement at that time was highly appreciated. He wrote a joint paper with some Croatian scientists about polymer science and technology in Croatia, presenting the country and the history, University centers, Institutes and industrial institutes involved in polymer research, their existing facilities and research programs. The second paper describes in details the Croatian Symposium of Chemistry and Macromolecular Chemistry held in Zagreb, Croatia, February 1995. The Symposium was opened with a plenary lecture by Otto Vogl "Macromolecular Architecture and Design". One of the very important achievements is the Pacific Polymer Federation created in the mid 80's as an active regional organization designed to advance and benefit polymer science and technology. He acted as a first president of the organization.

=== Australia and Far East Asia ===
==== Australia ====
Professor Vogl has been affectionately called the roaming ambassador for the Polymer Division of the ACS with special responsibility for East Asia and Australia. In this role he visited Australia on several occasions and gave lectures and visited laboratories in the eastern States of Australia, at the universities in Queensland (Brisbane), the Queensland University of Technology, the universities in Sydney and Melbourne and the CSIRO in Melbourne, and the capital of Australia in Canberra.

Vogl has done much to raise significantly the profile of Australian polymer science, especially through his leadership in the formation of the Pacific Polymer Federation. He strongly encouraged the RACI Polymer Division to become one of the three founding members of the federation. In the 1990s he wrote several topical articles for Polymer News in which he promoted Australian polymer science and scientists in Australia. In 1987 he was invited to Australia as a plenary lecturer at the APS Conference held at Phillip Island in Victoria, and he was invited again in 1993 to contribute to the PPF Congress which was held at the Conrad Jupiters Hotel on the Gold Coast near Brisbane, where he was awarded with the first Distinguished Service Award of the Pacific Polymer Federation. He has collaborated in scientific research with Professor Ken Ghiggino at the University of Melbourne on polymerizable and polymeric UV stabilizers and was on at least on one of their thesis committees. He was also on two evaluation Committees of the Australian Academy of Science and gracefully hosted many Australian visitors at his research laboratory.

The Polymer Group of the New Zealand Institute of Chemistry also became a Member of the PPF in 1989. Vogl visited New Zealand, the University of Auckland, as President of the PPF, and the Auckland University of Technology. He spent a week travelling throughout New Zealand.

==== Japan ====
On the occasion of attending the IUPAC Macromolecular Symposium in Prague in 1965, he was approached by Professor Seizo Okamura to consider coming to Kyoto University as an Industrial Adjunct Professor. Junji Furukawa, who was then chairman in the Department of Synthetic Chemistry appointed him for the fall semester 1968. He also lecturesd at the Toyonaka campus of Osaka University and was associated with Profs. Shunsuke Murahash, and Tani. With Furukawa he created the Japan-U.S. Seminars on Polymer Synthesis; the first was held in 1974]. In 1980 he spent one semester in Japan and gave short courses at Kyoto and Osaka Universities. In 1997 he was appointed for one Semester the Monbusho Professor at the Kyoto Institute of Technology and Osaka University. His outstanding contributions to and strong ties with Japanese polymer community resulted in several honors and awards from Japan (see “Honors and Awards”).

==== China ====
Vogl was one of the first polymer scientists of the US to be invited to visit the People's Republic of China. In September 1981 the first Polymer Conference, entitled ”Functional Polymers“ was held in Kunming, Yunnan, and he was the opening speaker. China was still not very experienced in the Sciences and Vogl was asked to visit several institutions all over China: Beijing (Institute of Chemistry), Shanghai (Fudan University, Shanghai Institute of Organic Chemistry), Changchun (Institute of Applied Chemistry and Chengdu to present lectures. He saw first-hand the status of Science and Life in China and 1984 he was invited by the Ministry of Education to introduce Polymer Science in Wuhan University (to his lectures came people from as far away as Lanzhou and Urumchi) and East China Normal University (Shanghai). He and his wife spent at that time one month in China, including a visit to Hanzhou. They visited many exotic places that are now Tourist attractions. Subsequently, The president of Zhejiang University, Hangzhou Yang Shilin spent 3 months in 1985 with Prof. Vogl in Brooklyn.

He got to know the Chinese leaders of this time in Polymer Science: Qian Renyuan, Qian Baogong, Yu Tongyin, Feng Xinde, He Binglin Wang Baoren, Wang You and Wang Fosong. He also developed a close working relationship with the Institute of Photo-chemistry In Beijing (Wu Shikang). In his visits to China he visited other Institutions in China.

Even in his first visit, contacts were made to have some scientist spend some time in his laboratory as Post Docs in Amherst and later in Brooklyn: Xi Fu and Hu Liping from Beijing, Li Shanjun and Fu Shoukuan from Shanghai, Xie S.S. from Chengdu and Zhang Jingyun from the Shanghai Institute of Organic Chemistry. Zhou Qifeng was Vogl's first Chinese student in Amherst and Qin Meifang his last in Brooklyn. Ultimately Xi Fu became the deputy director of the Institute of Chemistry and a president of the Chinese Chemical Society, Fu S.K. became the director of the Materials Institute at Fudan University, Zhang J.Y. the president of the Shanghai Academy of Science and Technology and Zhou Qifeng is now the president of Peking University, the Harvard of China. A total of 13 Chinese scientists worked in his laboratory.

Over the years Prof. Vogl became also interested in the traditional culture and Art of China, but he never learned the language.

When he was President of PPF Vogl invited the Chinese Polymer Division under Qian Reyuan to join the PPF. The later representative, Wang Fosong, Vice President of the Chinese Academy of Sciences, became President of PPF and held PPC-6 in Guangzhou in the fall of 1999.
