= Schönau an der Triesting =

- Municipality
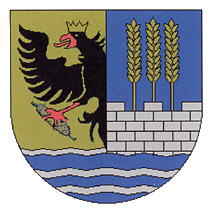
- Coat of arms

- Location within Austria
- Coordinates: 47°55′N 16°15′E
- Country: Austria
- State: Lower Austria
- District: Baden

Government
  - Mayor: Brigitte Lasinger

Area
  - Total: 8.08 km^{2} (3.12 sq mi)
- Elevation: 250 m (820 ft)

Population (2025)
  - Total: 2,141
  - Density: 265/km^{2} (686/sq mi)
- Time zone: UTC+1 (CET)
  - Summer (DST): UTC+2 (CEST)
- Postal code: 2525
- Area code: 02256
- Website: www.schoenautriesting.at

Schönau an der Triesting is a town in the district of Baden in Lower Austria in Austria.

== Demographics ==
Historical population
Year	Pop.	±%
1971	1,233	—
1981	1,289	+4.5%
1991	1,502	+16.5%
2001	1,769	+17.8%
2011	2,134	+20.6%
2021	2,137	+0.1%
2025	2,141	+0.2%

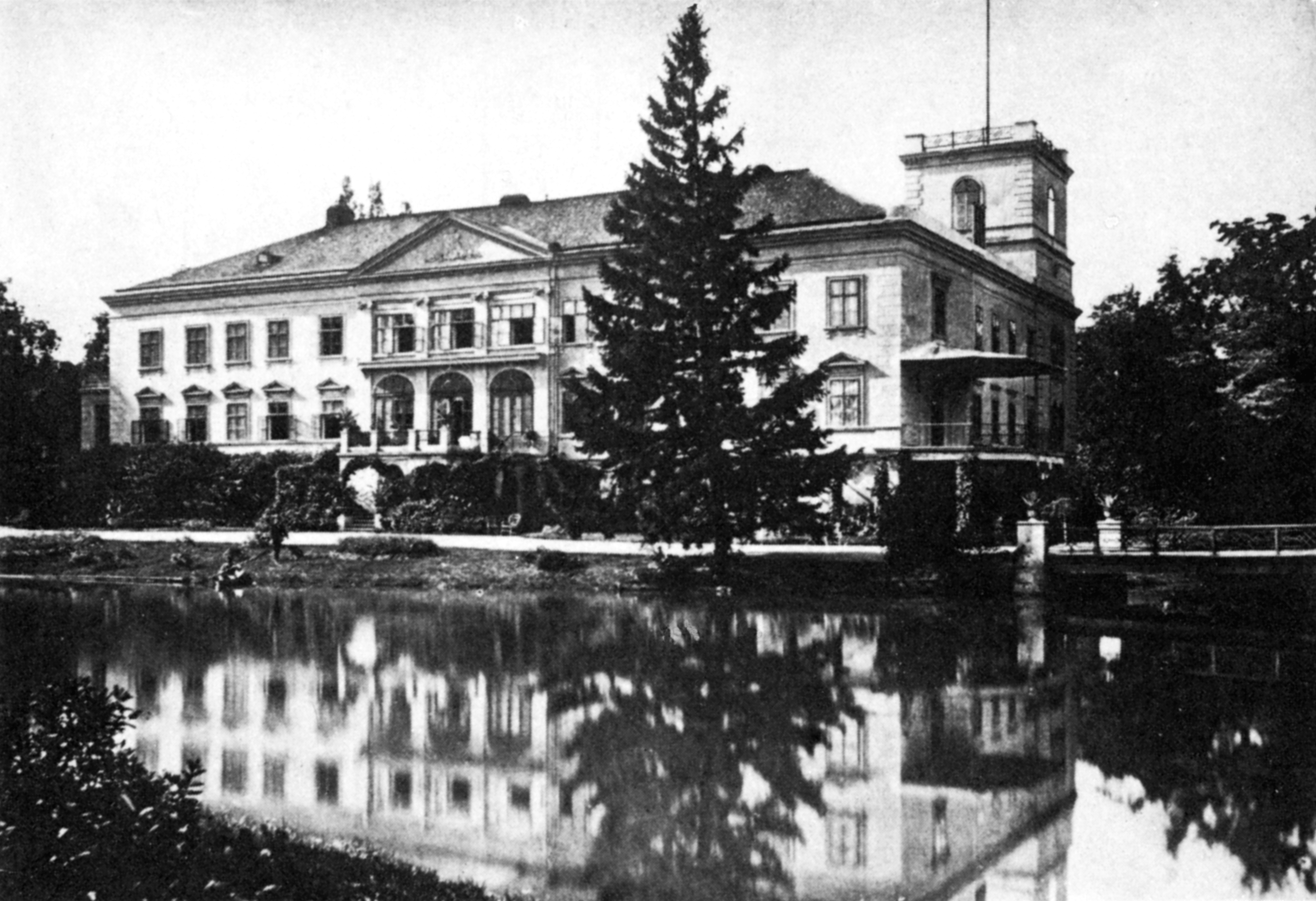
Castle Schönau (19th century)

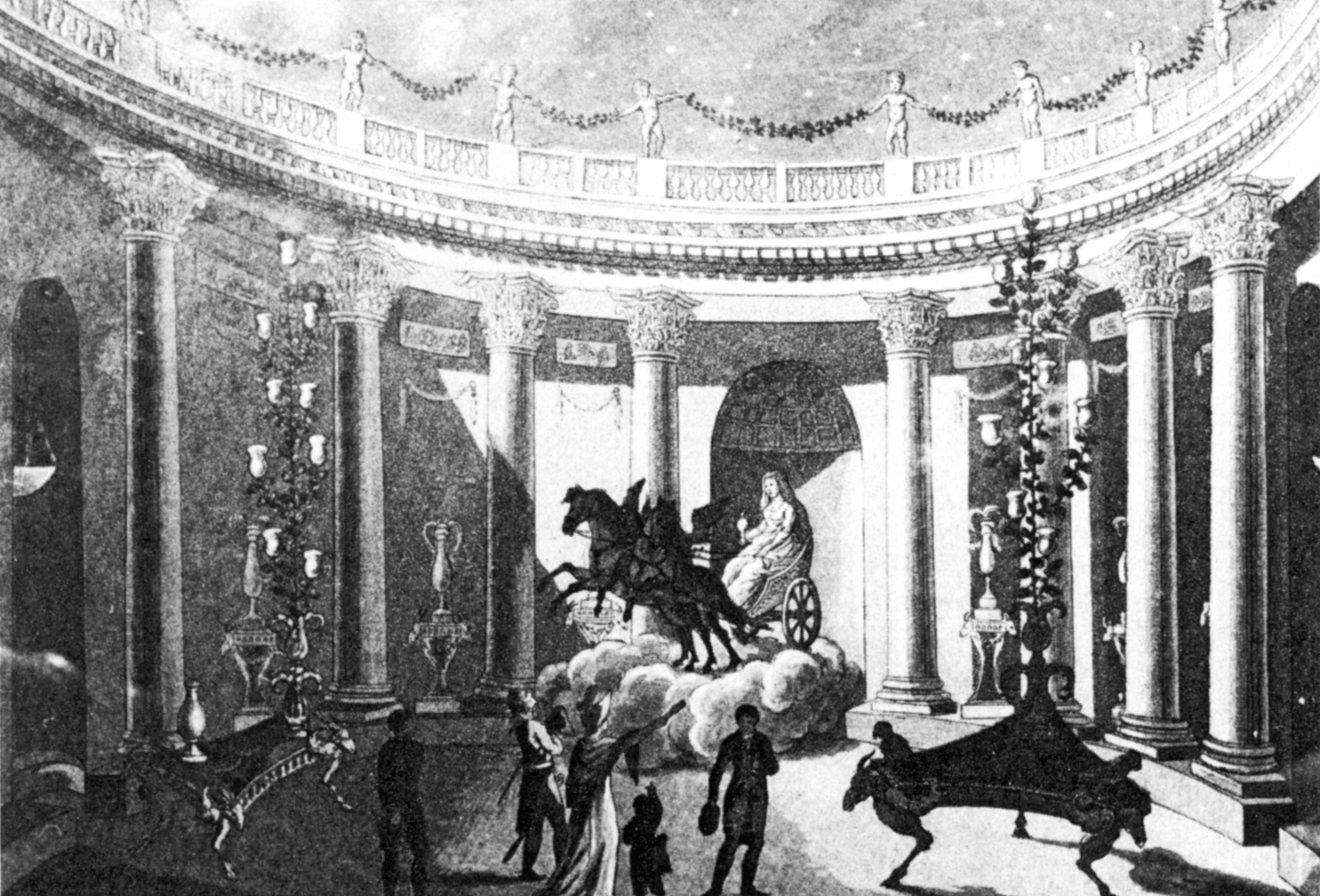
Temple of Night (19th century)
