= Teesdorf =

- Municipality
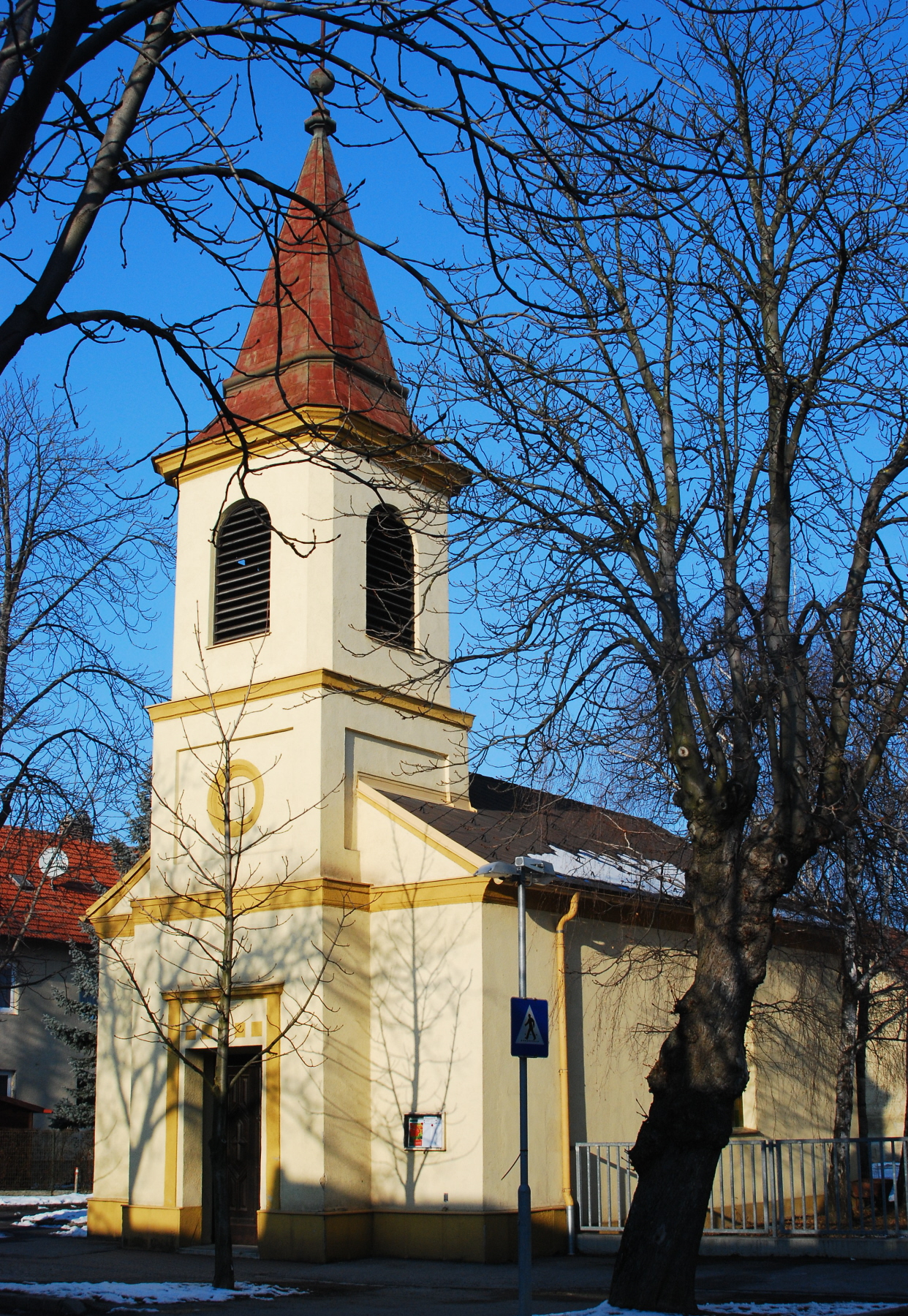
- Teesdorf Lutheran church

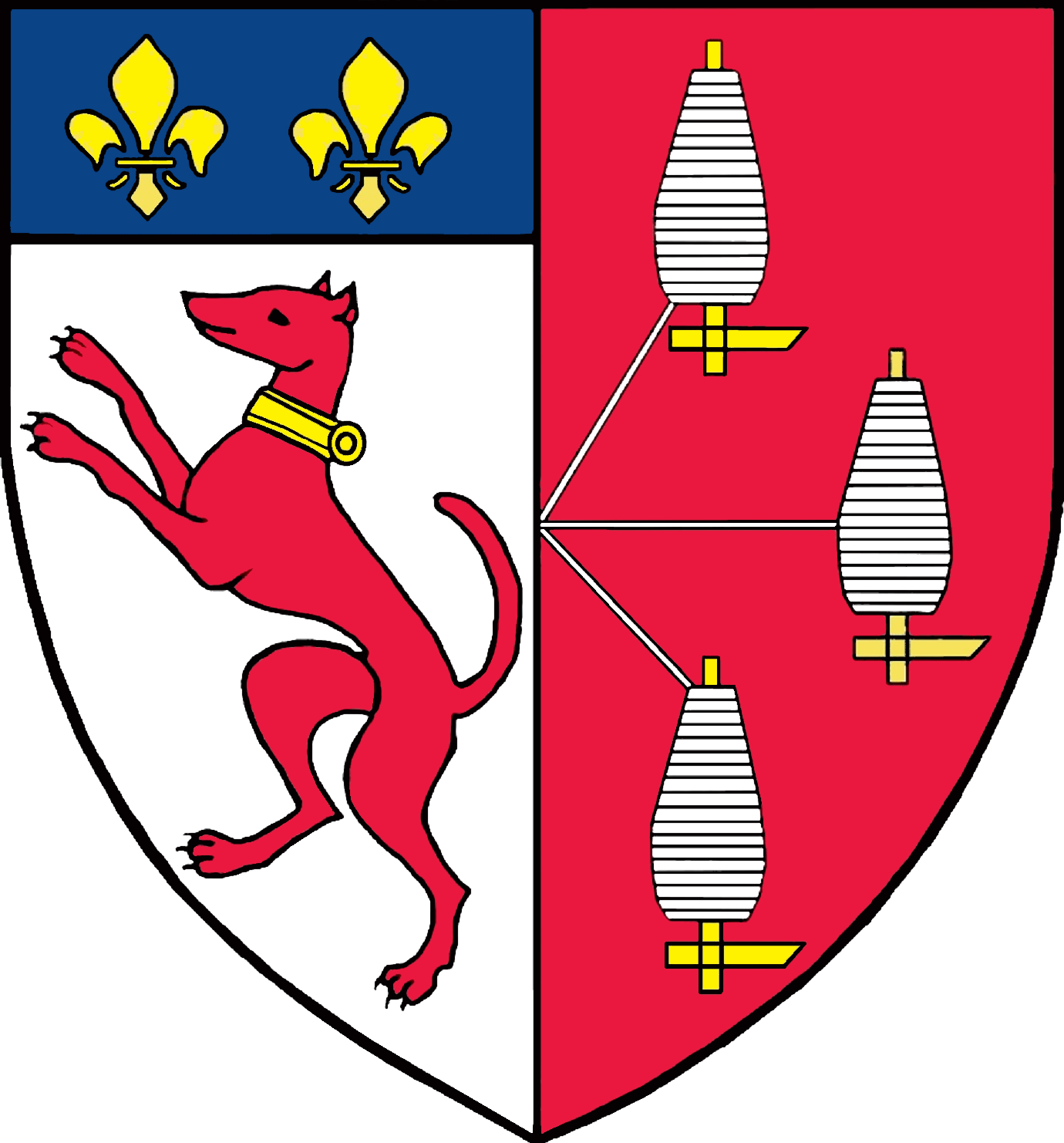
- Coat of arms

- Location within Austria
- Coordinates: 47°57′0″N 16°16′50″E
- Country: Austria
- State: Lower Austria
- District: Baden

Government
  - Mayor: Andreas Hoch

Area
  - Total: 7.3 km^{2} (2.8 sq mi)
- Elevation: 235 m (771 ft)

Population (2018-01-01)
  - Total: 1,822
  - Density: 250/km^{2} (650/sq mi)
- Time zone: UTC+1 (CET)
  - Summer (DST): UTC+2 (CEST)
- Postal code: 2524
- Area code: 02253
- Website: www.teesdorf.at

Teesdorf is a town in the district of Baden in Lower Austria in Austria.

== Population ==
Historical population
Year	Pop.	±%
1971	1,396	—
1981	1,332	−4.6%
1991	1,314	−1.4%
2001	1,341	+2.1%
2011	1,738	+29.6%
2021	1,777	+2.2%
2025	1,899	+6.9%
