= Sooß =

- Municipality
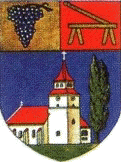
- Coat of arms

- Location within Austria
- Coordinates: 47°59′N 16°13′E
- Country: Austria
- State: Lower Austria
- District: Baden

Government
  - Mayor: Helene Schwarz

Area
  - Total: 5.49 km^{2} (2.12 sq mi)
- Elevation: 251 m (823 ft)

Population (2018-01-01)
  - Total: 1,050
  - Density: 191/km^{2} (495/sq mi)
- Time zone: UTC+1 (CET)
  - Summer (DST): UTC+2 (CEST)
- Postal code: 2500
- Area code: 02252
- Website: www.sooss.gv.at

Sooß is a town in the district of Baden in Lower Austria, Austria.

== Population ==
Historical population
Year	Pop.	±%
1971	882	—
1981	935	+6.0%
1991	866	−7.4%
2001	1,093	+26.2%
2011	1,099	+0.5%
