= Altenmarkt an der Triesting =

Altenmarkt an der Triesting Oitnmorkt aun da Triasding
- Municipality
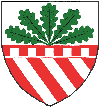
- Coat of arms

- Location within Austria
- Coordinates: 48°1′N 15°59′E
- Country: Austria
- State: Lower Austria
- District: Baden

Government
  - Mayor: Alois Nöstler

Area
  - Total: 63.51 km^{2} (24.52 sq mi)
- Elevation: 390 m (1,280 ft)

Population (2018-01-01)
  - Total: 2,113
  - Density: 33.27/km^{2} (86.17/sq mi)
- Time zone: UTC+1 (CET)
  - Summer (DST): UTC+2 (CEST)
- Postal code: 2571
- Area code: 02673
- Website: www.altenmarkt.co.at

Altenmarkt an der Triesting (Central Bavarian: Oitnmorkt aun da Triasding) is a town in the district of Baden in Lower Austria in Austria.

== Population ==
Historical population
Year	Pop.	±%
1971	1,754	—
1981	1,733	−1.2%
1991	206	−88.1%
2001	2,052	+896.1%
2011	2,092	+1.9%

== Climate ==
Climate data for Altenmarkt-Triesting
Month	Jan	Feb	Mar	Apr	May	Jun	Jul	Aug	Sep	Oct	Nov	Dec	Year
Record high °C (°F)	16.1 (61.0)	23.2 (73.8)	26.3 (79.3)	26.5 (79.7)	29.6 (85.3)	31.2 (88.2)	37.2 (99.0)	37.3 (99.1)	32.3 (90.1)	26.1 (79.0)	21.0 (69.8)	20.1 (68.2)	37.3 (99.1)
Mean daily maximum °C (°F)	2.4 (36.3)	4.3 (39.7)	9.5 (49.1)	13.8 (56.8)	19.2 (66.6)	21.8 (71.2)	24.1 (75.4)	24.0 (75.2)	20.0 (68.0)	14.3 (57.7)	7.2 (45.0)	3.8 (38.8)	13.7 (56.7)
Daily mean °C (°F)	−1.9 (28.6)	−0.6 (30.9)	3.5 (38.3)	7.1 (44.8)	12.4 (54.3)	15.5 (59.9)	17.4 (63.3)	16.9 (62.4)	13.1 (55.6)	8.0 (46.4)	2.6 (36.7)	−0.1 (31.8)	7.8 (46.1)
Mean daily minimum °C (°F)	−5.2 (22.6)	−4.0 (24.8)	−0.8 (30.6)	1.9 (35.4)	6.3 (43.3)	9.8 (49.6)	11.4 (52.5)	11.2 (52.2)	8.4 (47.1)	3.9 (39.0)	−0.6 (30.9)	−3.2 (26.2)	3.3 (37.8)
Record low °C (°F)	−29.8 (−21.6)	−26.9 (−16.4)	−24.2 (−11.6)	−8.8 (16.2)	−4.8 (23.4)	−1.4 (29.5)	3.1 (37.6)	1.7 (35.1)	−1.4 (29.5)	−8.8 (16.2)	−19.6 (−3.3)	−25.4 (−13.7)	−29.8 (−21.6)
Average precipitation mm (inches)	54.6 (2.15)	51.6 (2.03)	56.0 (2.20)	69.5 (2.74)	85.5 (3.37)	89.2 (3.51)	93.9 (3.70)	78.7 (3.10)	67.8 (2.67)	47.0 (1.85)	64.3 (2.53)	67.1 (2.64)	825.2 (32.49)
Average snowfall cm (inches)	32.7 (12.9)	37.9 (14.9)	23.3 (9.2)	4.2 (1.7)	0.0 (0.0)	0.0 (0.0)	0.0 (0.0)	0.0 (0.0)	0.0 (0.0)	0.0 (0.0)	21.0 (8.3)	47.1 (18.5)	166.2 (65.5)
Average precipitation days (≥ 1 mm)	9.6	8.9	9.5	10.1	10.1	10.8	10.5	9.5	8.3	6.9	10.2	10.8	115.2
Average snowy days (≥ 1 cm)	19.5	14.0	6.6	1.6	0.0	0.0	0.0	0.0	0.0	0.0	4.9	13.8	60.4
Average relative humidity (%) (at 0700)	86.1	86.8	86.3	85.6	84.1	83.4	83.8	88.1	90.0	88.7	88.1	86.0	86.4
Source: zamg.ac.at
