= Klausen-Leopoldsdorf =

- Municipality
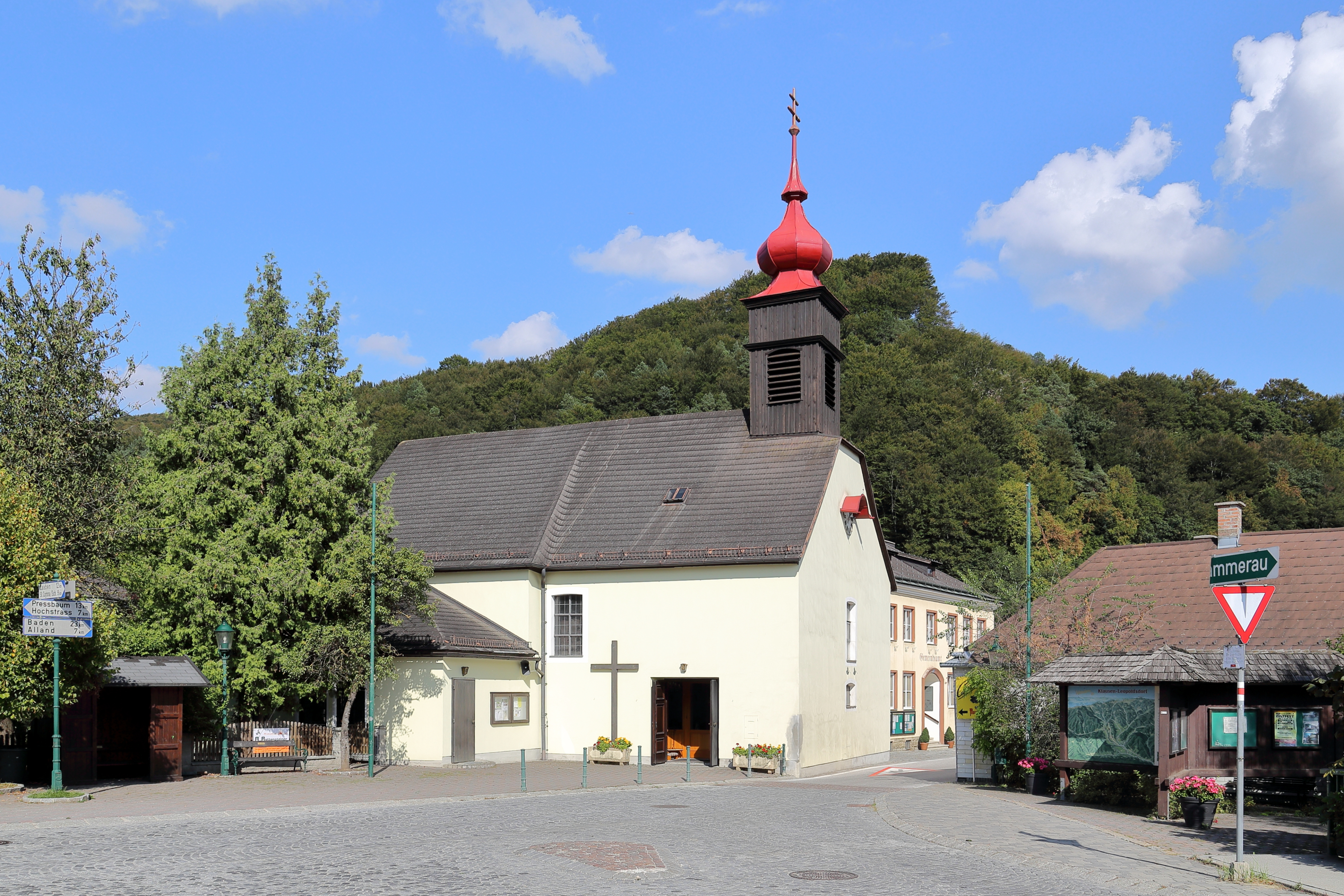
- Klausen-Leopoldsdorf parish church

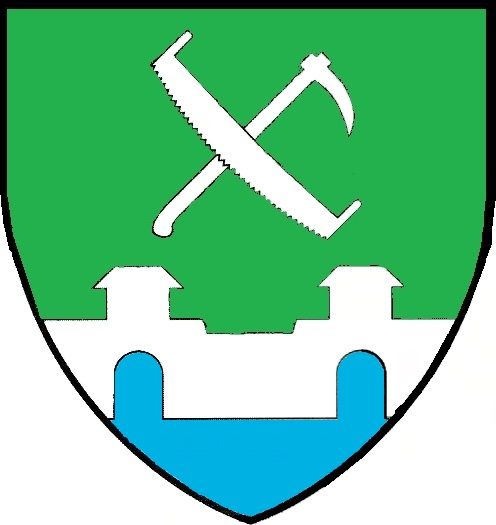
- Coat of arms

- Location within Austria
- Coordinates: 48°6′N 16°0′E
- Country: Austria
- State: Lower Austria
- District: Baden

Government
  - Mayor: Herbert Lameraner

Area
  - Total: 60.04 km^{2} (23.18 sq mi)
- Elevation: 375 m (1,230 ft)

Population (2018-01-01)
  - Total: 1,681
  - Density: 28.00/km^{2} (72.51/sq mi)
- Time zone: UTC+1 (CET)
  - Summer (DST): UTC+2 (CEST)
- Postal code: 2533
- Area code: 02257
- Website: www.klausen-leopoldsdorf.gv.at

Klausen-Leopoldsdorf a town in the district of Baden in Lower Austria in Austria.

== Population ==
Historical population
Year	Pop.	±%
1971	1,215	—
1981	1,166	−4.0%
1991	1,169	+0.3%
2001	1,386	+18.6%
2011	1,608	+16.0%
