= Traiskirchen =

- Municipality
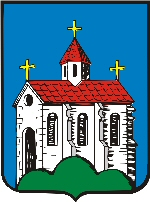
- Coat of arms

- Location within Austria
- Coordinates: 48°1′N 16°18′E
- Country: Austria
- State: Lower Austria
- District: Baden

Government
  - Mayor: Sabrina Divoky (SPÖ)

Area
  - Total: 29.1 km^{2} (11.2 sq mi)
- Elevation: 200 m (660 ft)

Population (2018-01-01)
  - Total: 18,858
  - Density: 648/km^{2} (1,680/sq mi)
- Time zone: UTC+1 (CET)
  - Summer (DST): UTC+2 (CEST)
- Postal code: 2514
- Area code: 02252
- Website: www.traiskirchen.gv.at

Traiskirchen is a city and Municipality in the district of Baden in Lower Austria in Austria. It is 20 km south of Vienna, in the Thermenlinie region, known for its wine and heurigers. Traiskirchen is home to the Traiskirchen Lions basketball team. The town has the oldest public astronomical observatory in Lower Austria. The city is also known for its refugee camp the "Bundesbetreuungsstelle für Asylwerber".

== Municipality ==
The municipality of Traiskirchen comprise five towns (Population numbers as of 28 February 2023):

- Traiskirchen (7,777)
- Möllersdorf (5,177)
- Wienersdorf (3,427)
- Tribuswinkel (4,295)
- Oeynhausen (1,413)

== Population ==
The below population numbers include the total of the municipality of Traiskirchen, not just the city itself.

Historical population
Year	Pop.	±%
1869	3,909	—
1880	4,380	+12.0%
1890	4,947	+12.9%
1900	6,011	+21.5%
1910	8,436	+40.3%
1923	8,139	−3.5%
1934	8,922	+9.6%
1939	8,908	−0.2%
1951	8,057	−9.6%
1961	9,247	+14.8%
1971	11,978	+29.5%
1981	14,063	+17.4%
1991	13,952	−0.8%
2001	15,669	+12.3%
2011	17,169	+9.6%
2023	21,440	+24.9%

== Refugee Camp (Bundesbetreuungsstelle für Asylwerber) ==
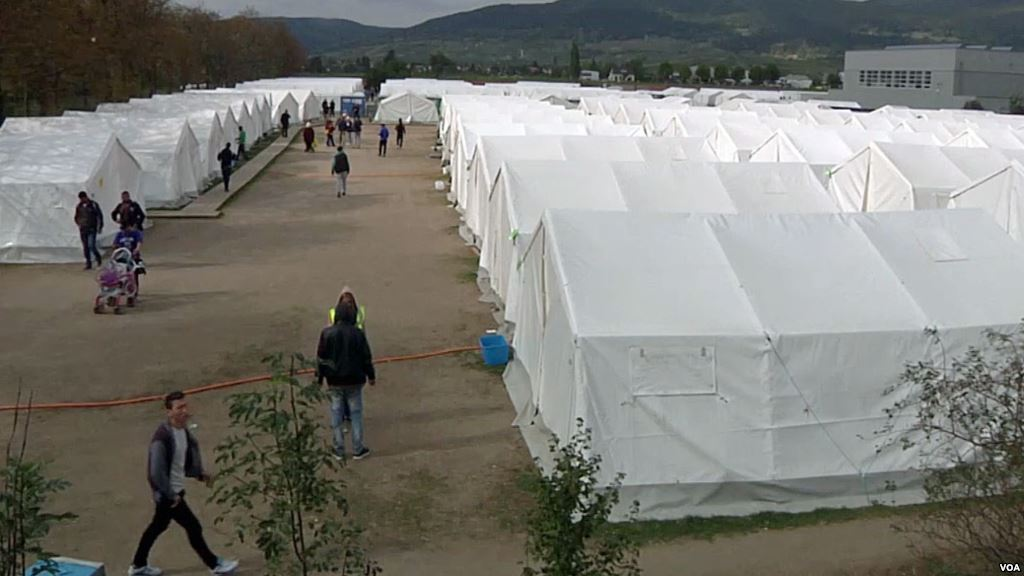
Refugee camp in 2015

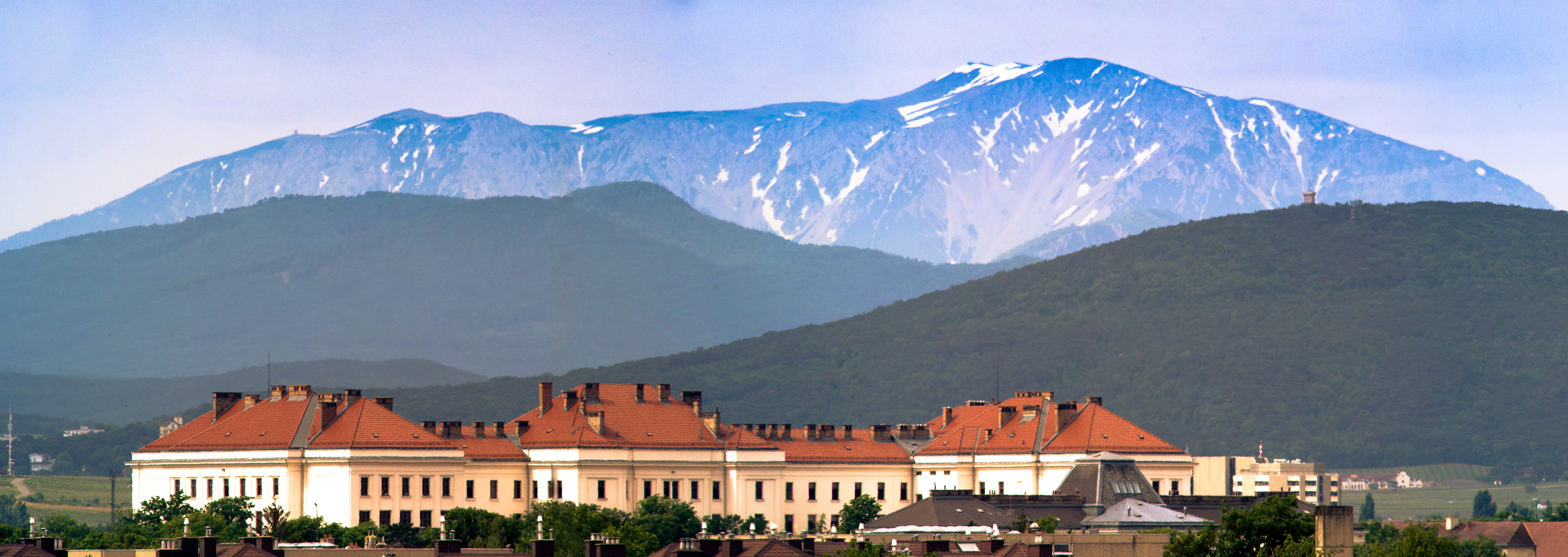
Camp in Traiskirchen

Traiskirchen is home of the largest refugee camp in Austria and one of the largest of these camps in the EU. The refugee camp is based in the centre of Traiskirchen on the area of the former Imperial Artillery Cadet School which was built in 1900. The Traiskirchen Cadet School could accommodate up to 340 cadets, 160 staff and 110 horses (for riding lessons).

During the time of the Allied-occupied Austria, a Soviet army barracks of (about 2,000 Soviet armored troops) and a hospital were housed in the former buildings until the autumn of 1955.

The buildings were first used by the government as a refugee camp between 1956 and 1960. The camp was first used as a shelter for Hungarian refugees, who had left their country as a result of the Hungarian Revolution in November 1956. 113,810 people came to Austria on the 5th of November, and 6,000 were taken to the camp in Traiskirchen. This was the first large use as a refugee camp, and following this it was decided to host further refugees from around the world. On 8 March 1957 the Federal Ministry of the Interior assigned 20 million Schillings (€1.45 million) for the renovation of the building structures. After the Prague Spring (1968) Czech and Slovak refugees were brought here. In the 1970s and 1980s more refugees – mainly from Eastern Europe, but also from Uganda, Chile, Iran, Iraq and Vietnam – were accommodated. Many prominent refugees were initially received here, including the later Vienna State Opera Director Ioan Holender and the journalist Paul Lendvai.

In May 1990 it was announced by the Mayor of Traiskirchen that, in line with the promise by the Minister of the Interior, the institute would be closed permanently. However this plan was rejected, because only a few refugees could be accommodated elsewhere in 1990; also it was expected that accommodation for new refugees from the Soviet Union would be needed in January 1991.

In 1993 the refugee camp was renamed the Asylum Office of the Federal Ministry of the Interior ("Bundesbetreuungsstelle für Asylwerber").

In 2015, as a result of the European migrant crisis, the Asylum Office had to admit an increasing number of illegal immigrants. Following strong criticism from the press and the public, Amnesty International inspected the facility on 6 August 2015.

By the end of July 2015 more than 4,500 people were being accommodated. On 5 August, the day before the inspection, the authorities declared a stop to further admissions. Nevertheless at the time of the inspection around 1,500 people were unsheltered, among them more than 500 unattended children and teenagers.

According to the Amnesty report the conditions at the refugee camp were inhumane and unworthy of any human being: lack of staff and translators, lack of organization, food supply problems (two hours wait), terrible sanitary conditions, no separate sections for women and men, and a point system for punishment for fighting but also for complaints, resulting in spending several nights outside the facility.

== Issues ==
Traiskirchen refugee camp is frequently subject to political and media debate in Austria. Refugees' poor living conditions have been criticized, and the inmates have been associated with drug dealing, theft and violent crime. The police are often accused of conducting semi-legal actions in raids both inside and outside the camp.

In 2003, the Interior Minister, Ernst Strasser, outsourced the camp to the German company European Home Care. This (criticized) contract was cancelled by the company in 2010 because of low occupancy.

== Education ==
=== Kindergarten ===
- Kindergarten Möllersdorf Pestalozzi-Gasse
- Kindergarten Möllesdorf Schlössl
- Kindergarten Traiskirchen Bärenhöhle
- Kindergarten Traiskirchen Biberburg
- Kindergarten Traiskirchen Alfons Petzold
- Kindergarten Tribuswinkel Schloss
- Kindergarten Tribuswinkel Badner Straße
- Kindergarten Wienersdorf
- Oeynhausen Pfarrkindergarten from the church

=== Schools ===
==== Primary school ====
- Volksschule Möllersdorf
- Volksschule Tribuswinkel
- Volksschule Traiskirchen

The primary school in Traiskirchen is encircled by a fence for security purposes.

==== Secondary school ====
- Sport Middleschool Traiskirchen

==== School for disabled pupils ====
- Sonderschule Traiskirchen

==== Police education school ====
The "Bildungszentrum der Sicherheitsexekutive (BZS)" Traiskirchen is an education institution for the Austrian police.

==== Issues ====
The percentage of foreigners in the secondary and primary schools sometimes exceeds 70% and is often discussed in the public. Traiskirchen has no highschool or college for higher education.

== Sights ==
=== Franz-Koller Observatory ===
This observatory is the oldest in the state of Lower Austria and has been open to the public since 1967. It is unlike many observatories due to its location in the middle of the city and its low elevation, making it susceptible to the winter fog that plagues the region.

=== St. Nicholas Church ===
This church is notable for its age. It was built around the year 1400.

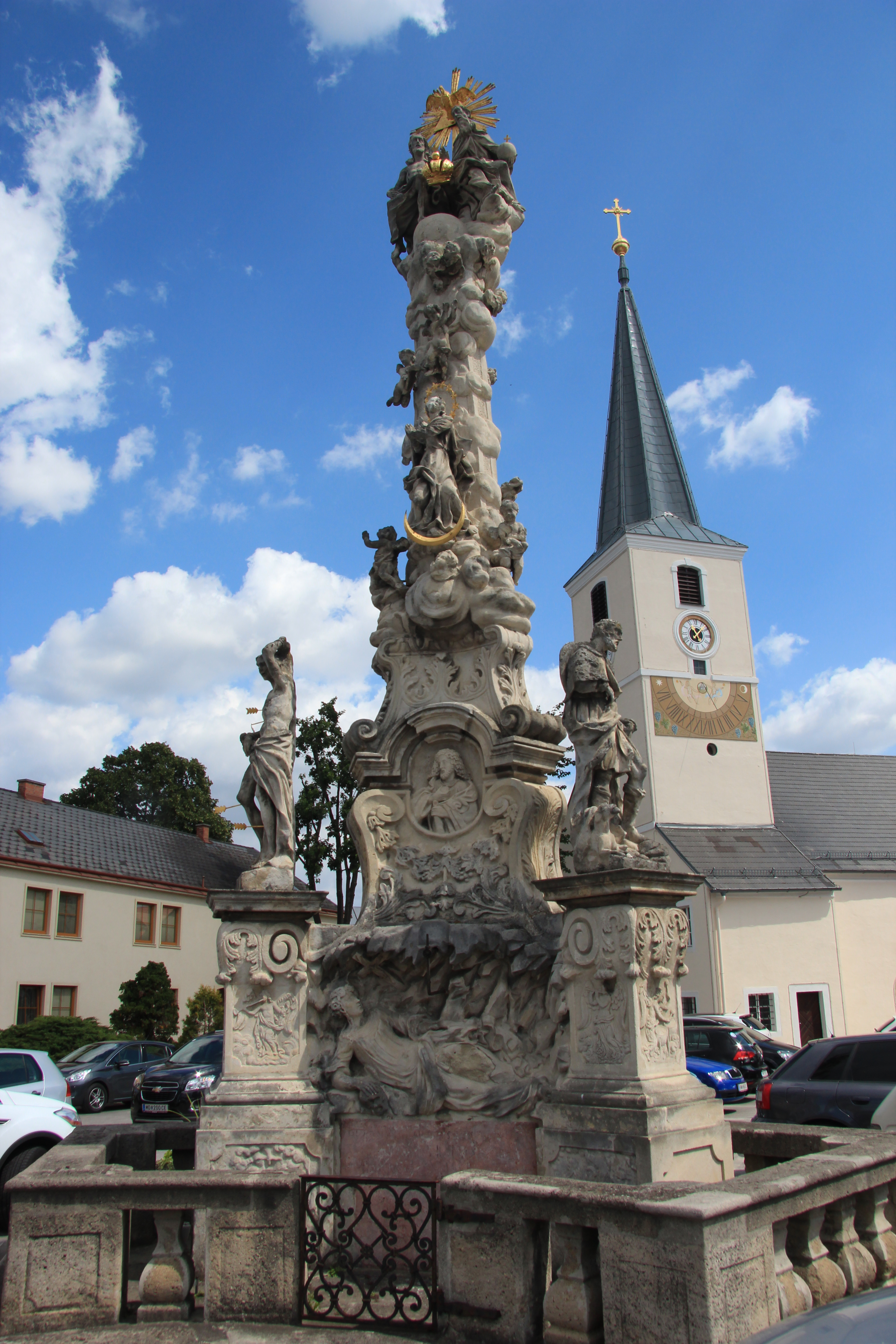
Castle of Tribuswinkel

=== St. Margaret Church ===
The church was rebuilt in 1683 after the siege of Vienna based on its gothic foundations.

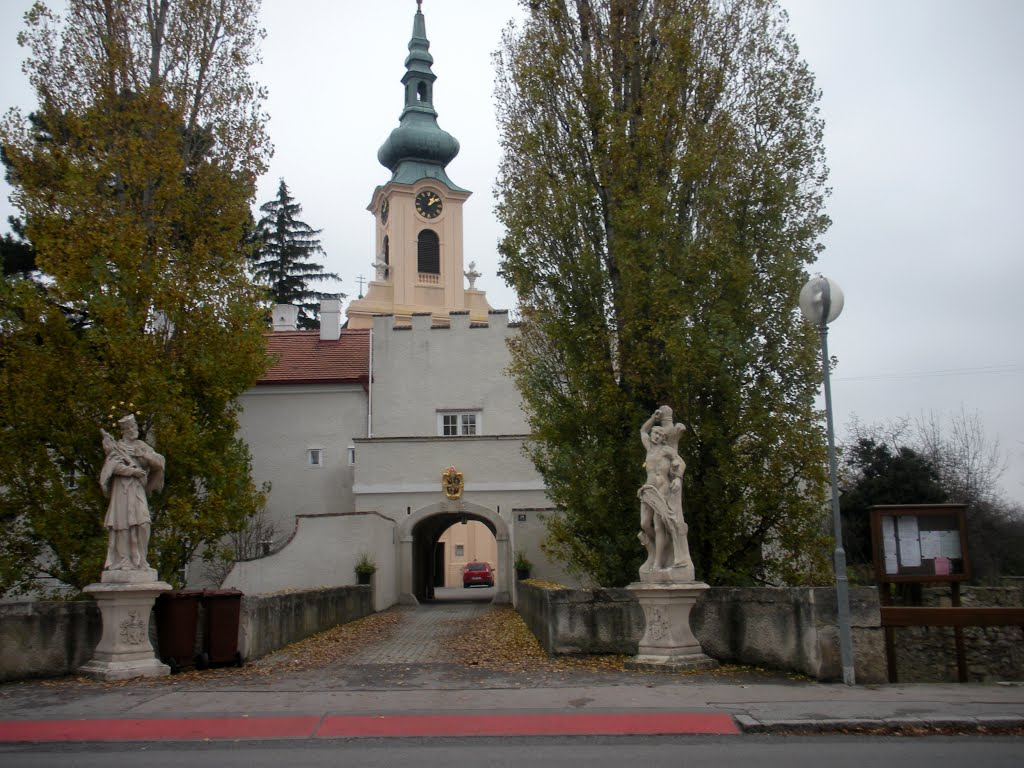
St Margareth Church

=== Lutheran Church ===
The church was built 1913.

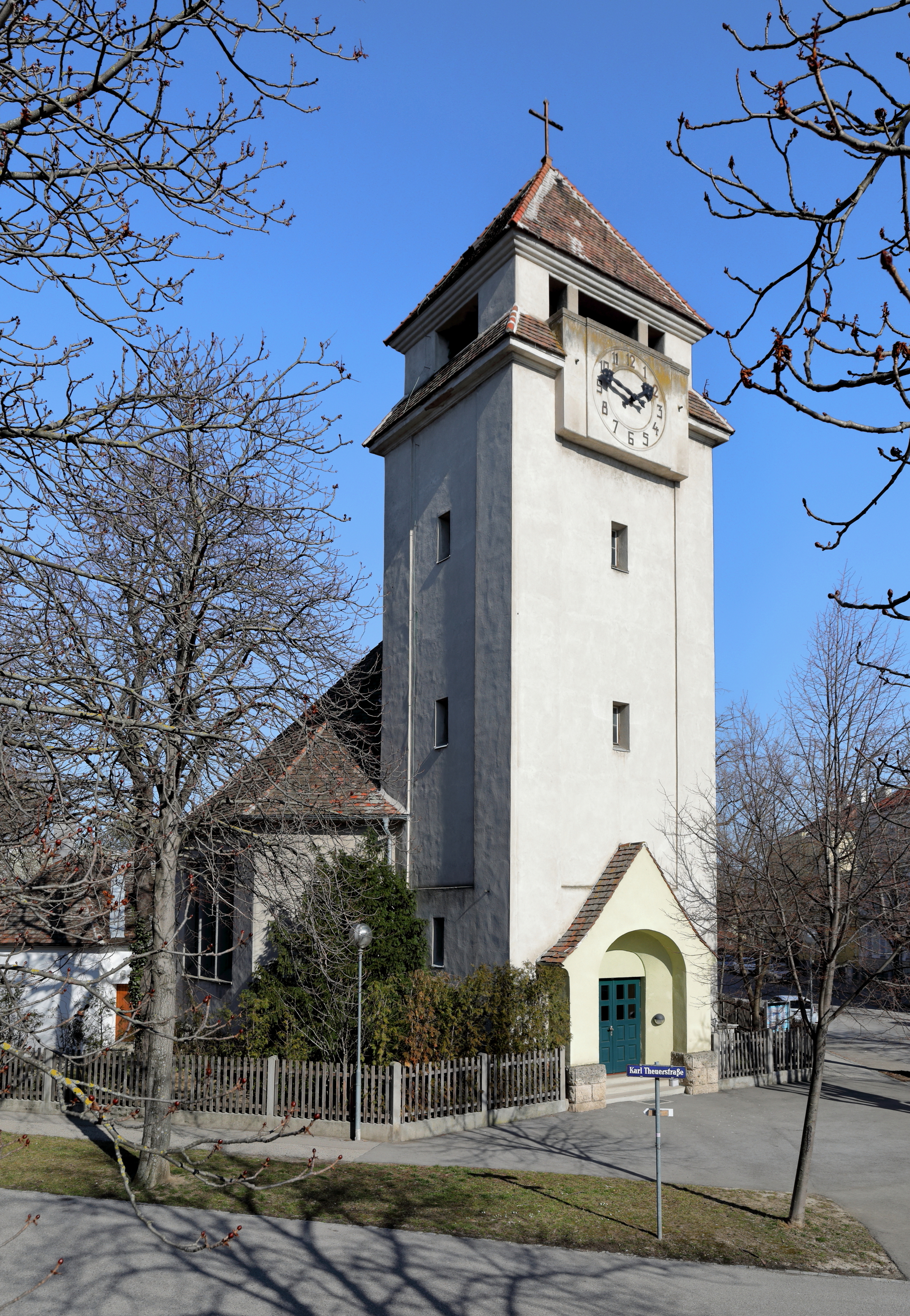
Lutheran Church Traiskirchen

=== The Geldscheisser ===
The famous "Geldscheisser" is located in the city centre.

=== Malt Factory ===
The malt factory was owned by the banker Max Mauthner (born 22. Juli 1838 in Prague, † 28. Dezember 1904 in Vienna).

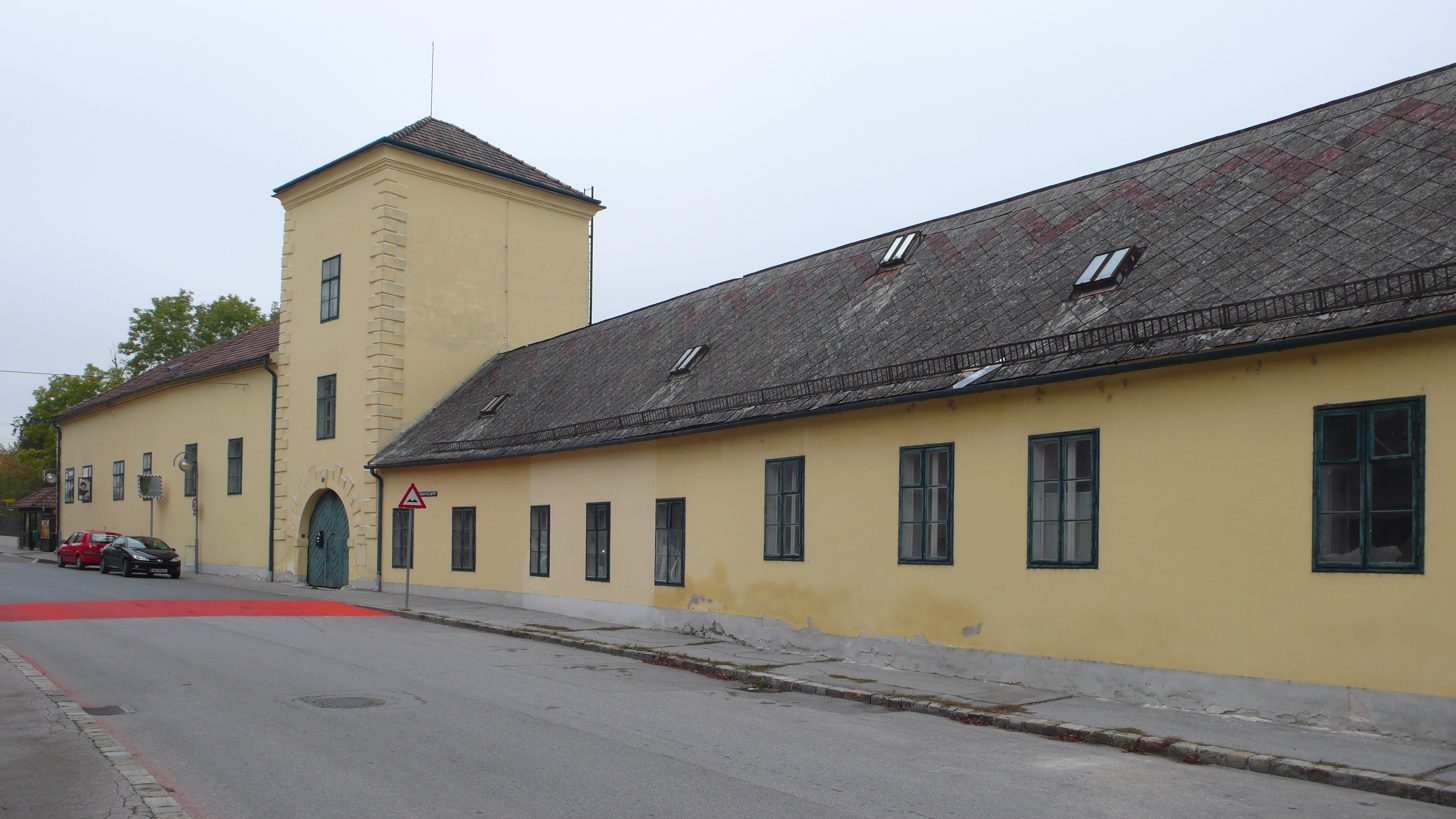
Wienersdorf Malt Factory

=== Castle of Moellersdorf ===
The castle was erected about 1690–1700 from Thomas Zachäus Czernin von und zu Chudenitz. About 1780 Joseph II dedicated the facility to a casern.

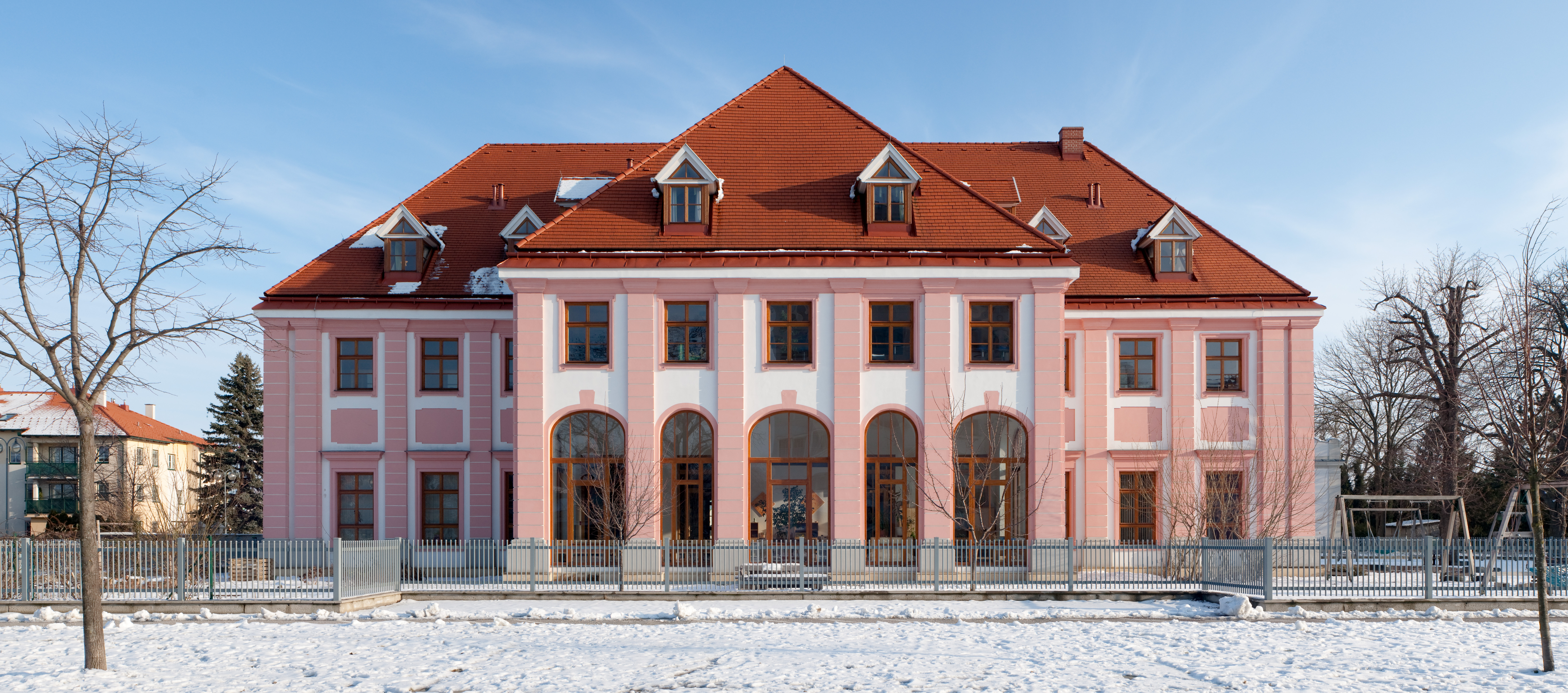
Castle Moellersdorf

=== Castle of Tribuswinkel ===
The founding is dated 1136, but earlier resourcers refer to 1120.

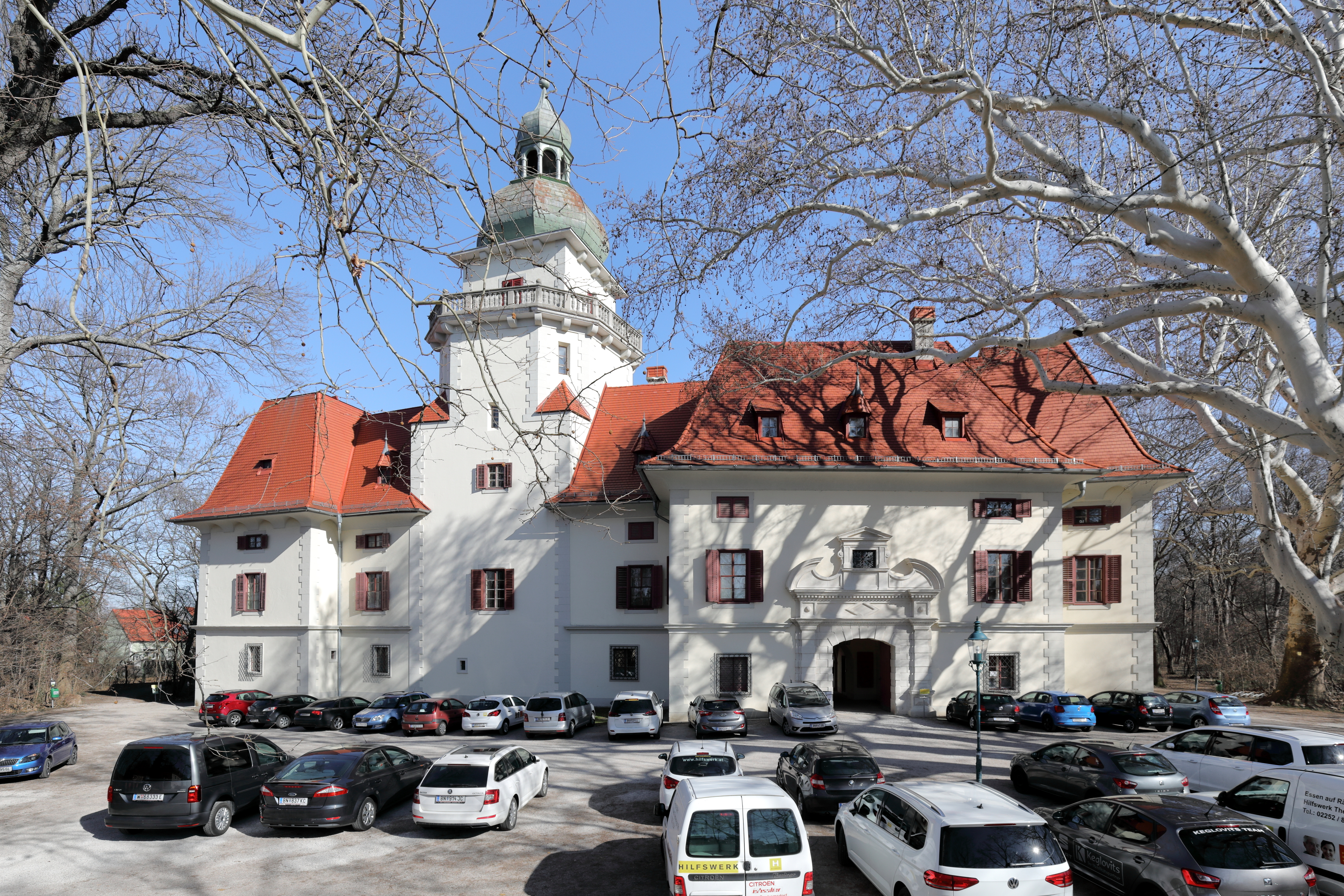
Castle of Tribuswinkel

The weir would probably have been built as surrounding water castle around 1120-1230. The wall surrounding the castle and the moult do not existing anymore.

== Basketball ==
The city is home to the Traiskirchen Lions, 3-time Champion of the Österreichische Basketball Bundesliga. The team plays its home games in the Lions Dome.

== People ==
- Joseph Fendi, the father of the painter Peter Fendi came from Traiskirchen
- Hans Seischab (1898-1965), professor of Business Administration
- Hellmuth Swietelsky (1905-1995), businessman and founder of a construction company
- Franz Kroller (1923-2000), director of the University Library Graz
- Otto Vogl (1927-2013), chemist
- Harald Neudorfer (born 1962), professor of propulsion technology
- Andreas Babler (born 1973), chair of the Social Democratic Party of Austria, Vice-Chancellor of Austria
