= Reisenberg =

- Municipality
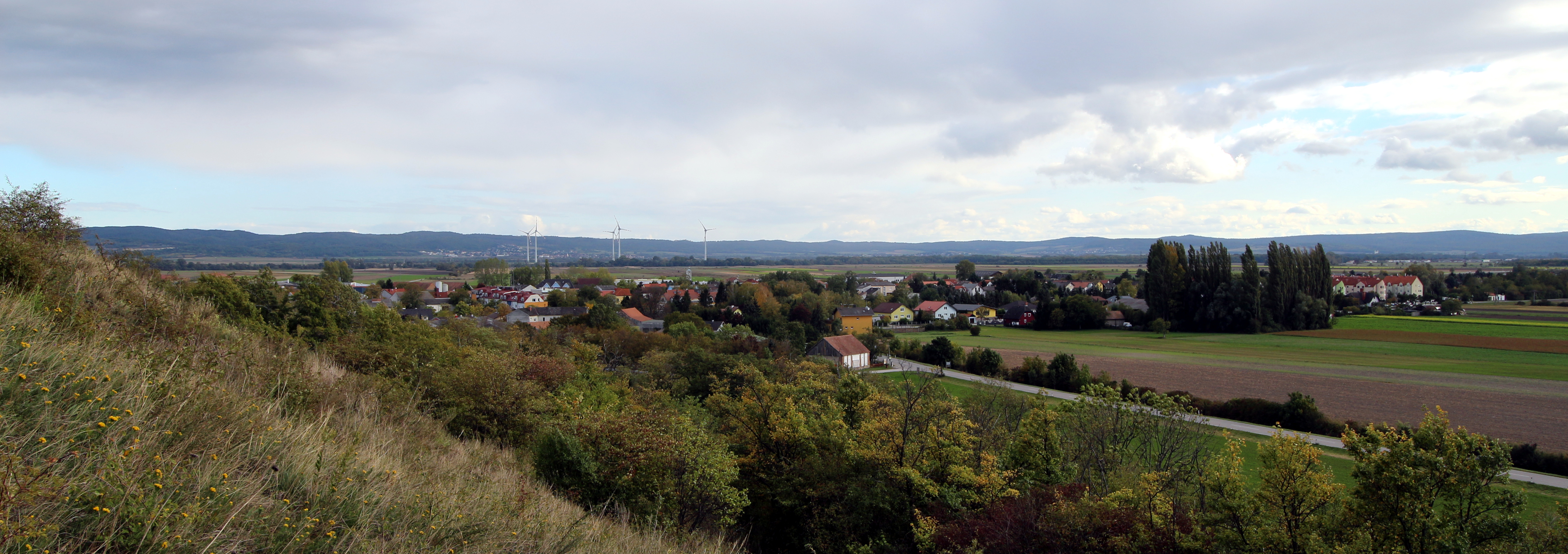

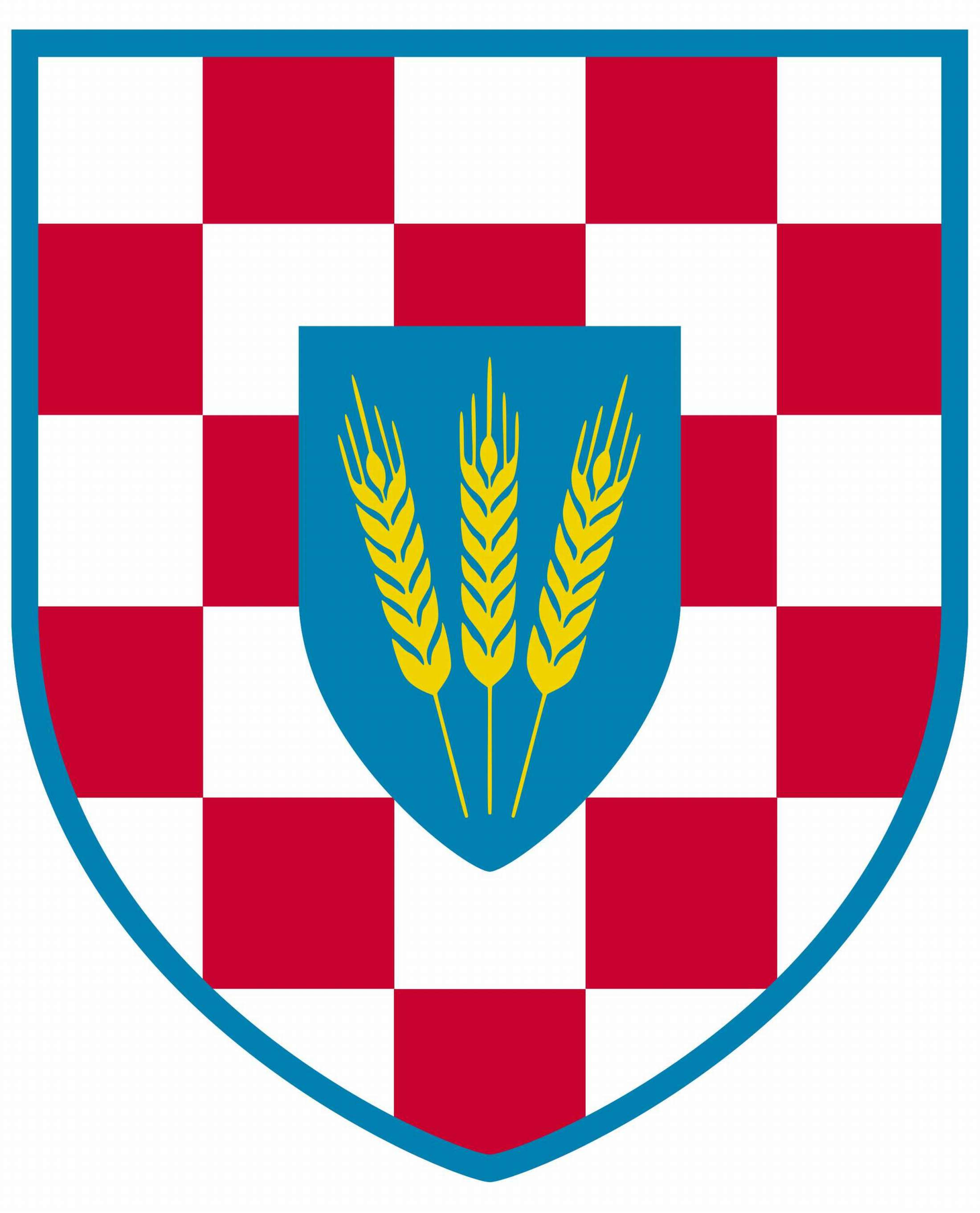
- Coat of arms

- Location within Austria
- Coordinates: 48°0′N 16°31′E
- Country: Austria
- State: Lower Austria
- District: Baden

Government
  - Mayor: Josef Sam

Area
  - Total: 17.8 km^{2} (6.9 sq mi)
- Elevation: 194 m (636 ft)

Population (2018-01-01)
  - Total: 1,689
  - Density: 94.9/km^{2} (246/sq mi)
- Time zone: UTC+1 (CET)
  - Summer (DST): UTC+2 (CEST)
- Postal code: 2440
- Area code: 02234
- Website: www.reisenberg.gv.at

Reisenberg is a town in the district of Baden in Lower Austria in Austria.

== Population ==
Historical population
Year	Pop.	±%
1971	962	—
1981	1,107	+15.1%
1991	1,186	+7.1%
2001	1,404	+18.4%
2011	1,551	+10.5%
