= Mitterndorf an der Fischa =

- Municipality
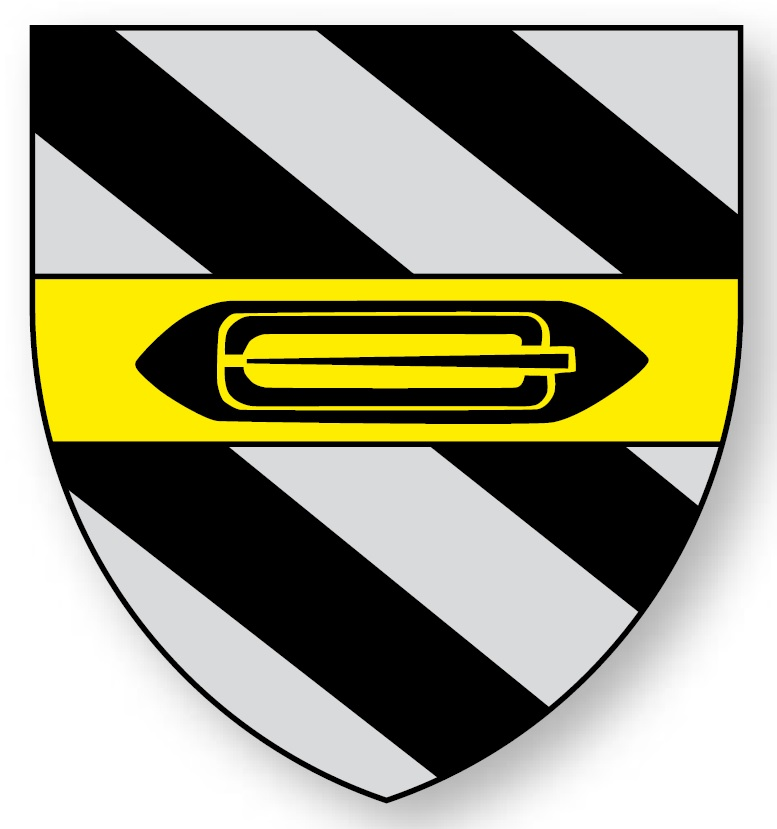
- Coat of arms

- Location within Austria
- Coordinates: 47°58′N 16°28′E
- Country: Austria
- State: Lower Austria
- District: Baden

Government
  - Mayor: Thomas Jechne (SPÖ)

Area
  - Total: 10.78 km^{2} (4.16 sq mi)
- Elevation: 186 m (610 ft)

Population (2025)
  - Total: 3,125
  - Density: 289.9/km^{2} (750.8/sq mi)
- Time zone: UTC+1 (CET)
  - Summer (DST): UTC+2 (CEST)
- Postal code: 2440, 2441
- Website: www.mitterndorf.at

Mitterndorf an der Fischa is a municipality in the district of Baden in Lower Austria in Austria.

== Geography ==
It is located 20 kilometers (12 mi) southeast of Vienna.

Mitterndorf an der Fischa consists of one catastral community (Katastralgemeinde) (Population as of 2025):

- Mitterndorf (3,125)

Mitterndorf an der Fischa can be further divided into one locality (Ortschaft) (Population as of 2025):

- Mitterndorf an der Fischa (3,125)

== Demographics ==
Historical population
Year	Pop.	±%
1971	863	—
1981	893	+3.5%
1991	1,055	+18.1%
2001	1,448	+37.3%
2011	2,113	+45.9%
2021	2,951	+39.7%
2025	3,125	+5.9%

== Politics ==
The municipal council (Gemeinderat) consists of 23 members. Since the 2025 Lower Austrian local elections, it is made up of the following parties:

- Social Democratic Party of Austria (SPÖ): 15 seats
- Austrian People's Party (ÖVP): 5 seats
- Freedom Party of Austria (FPÖ): 3 seats

== Gallery ==
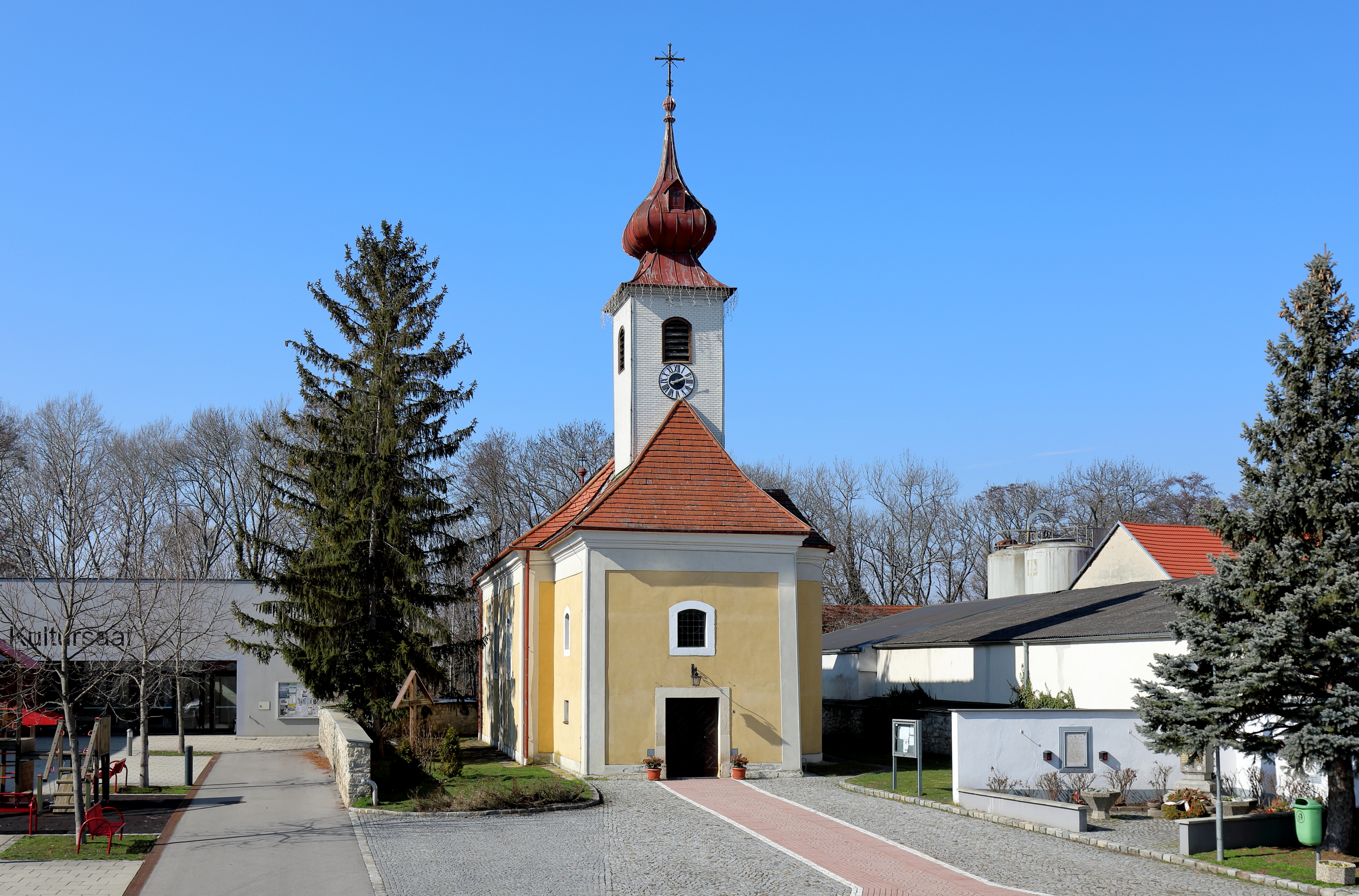
Parish church
