= Günselsdorf =

- Municipality
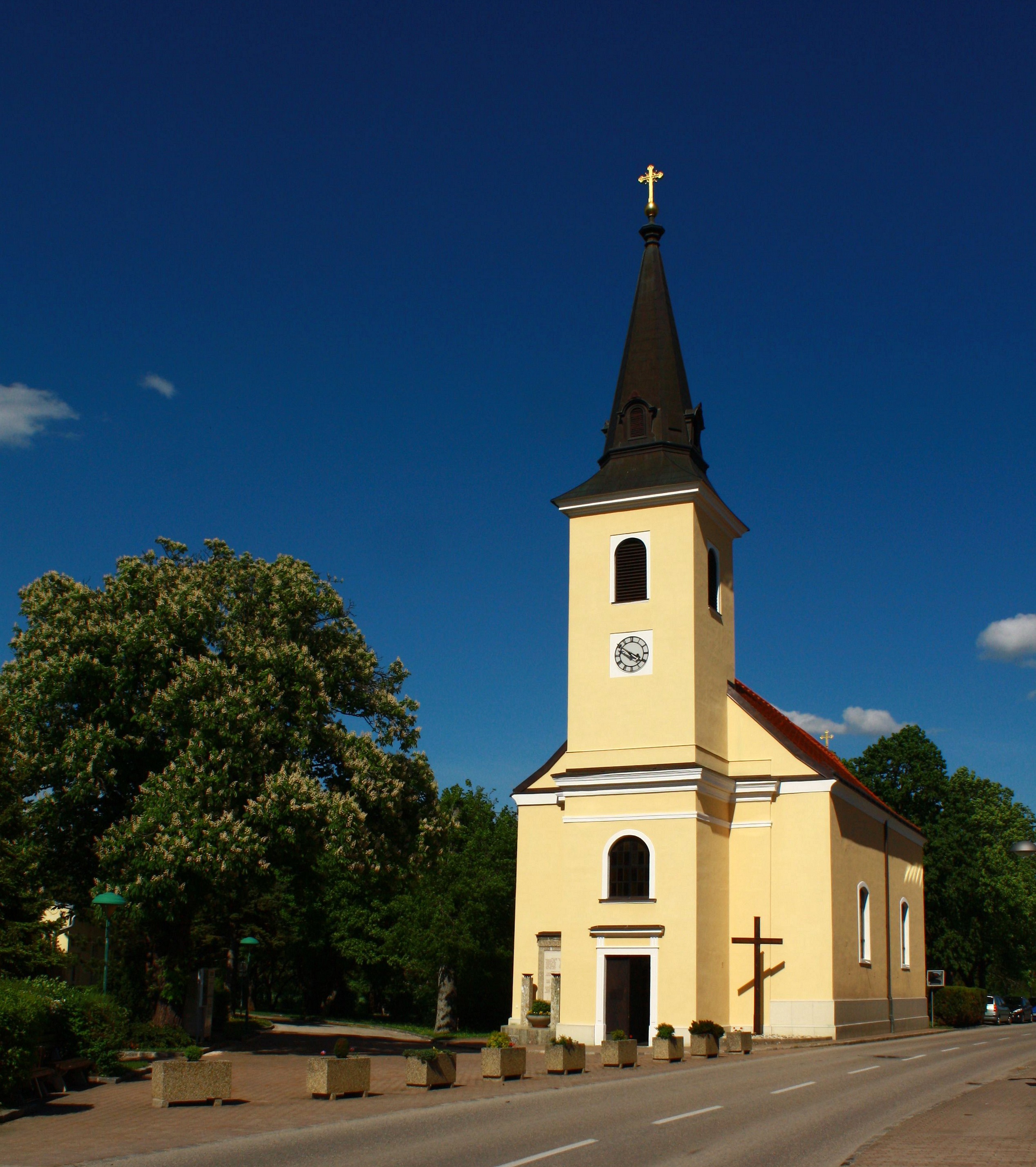
- The catholic church in Günselsdorf

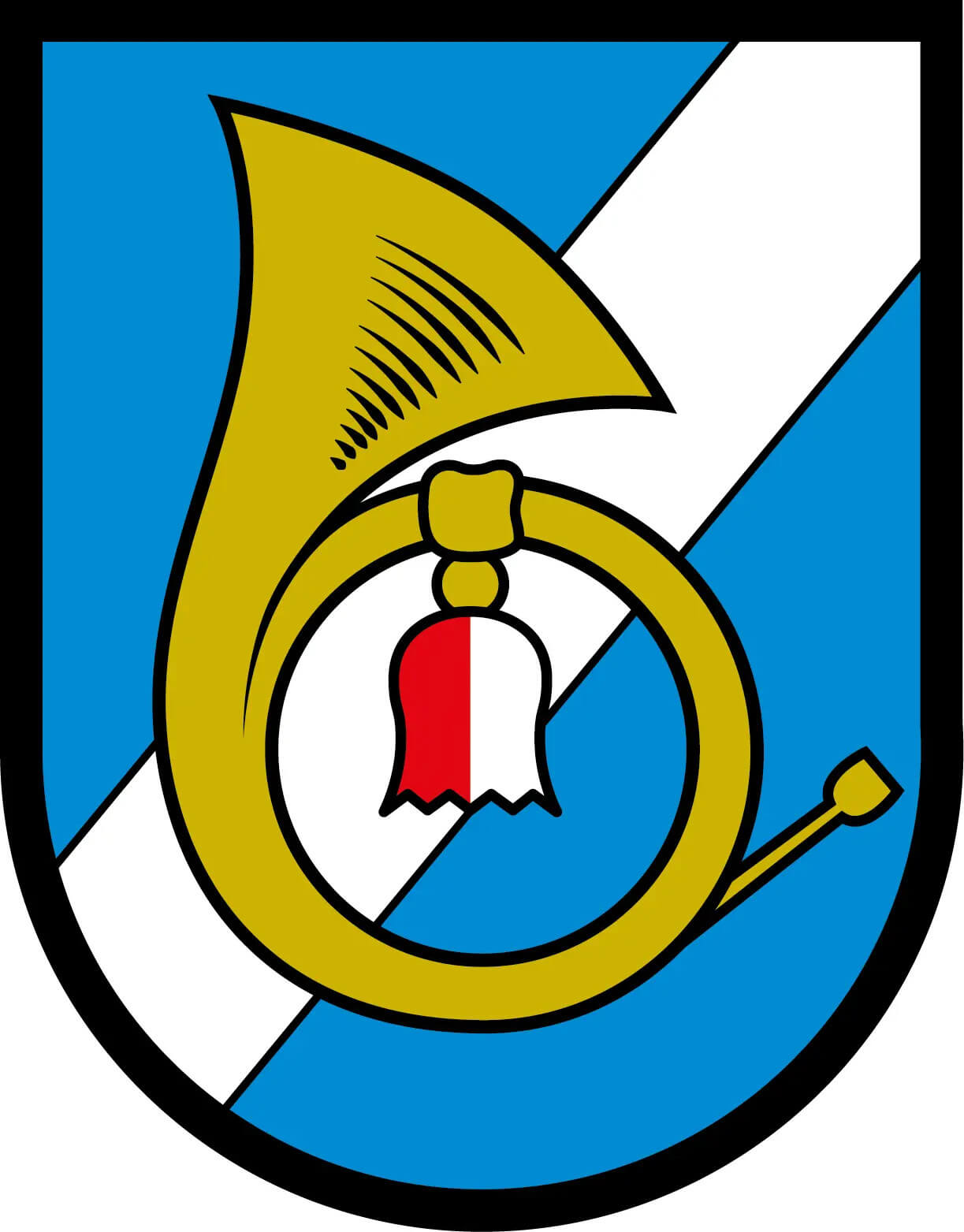
- Coat of arms

- Location within Austria
- Coordinates: 47°56′N 16°16′E
- Country: Austria
- State: Lower Austria
- District: Baden

Government
  - Mayor: Helmuth Kaipel

Area
  - Total: 6.62 km^{2} (2.56 sq mi)
- Elevation: 243 m (797 ft)

Population (2018-01-01)
  - Total: 1,707
  - Density: 258/km^{2} (668/sq mi)
- Time zone: UTC+1 (CET)
  - Summer (DST): UTC+2 (CEST)
- Postal code: 2525
- Area code: 02256
- Website: www.guenselsdorf.at

Günselsdorf is a town in the district of Baden in Lower Austria in Austria.

== Population ==
Historical population
Year	Pop.	±%
1971	1,210	—
1981	1,426	+17.9%
1991	1,458	+2.2%
2001	1,768	+21.3%
2011	1,758	−0.6%

== Economy ==
The global headquarters of Feller GmbH, a worldwide manufacturer of power cords, data cables and interconnection wiring, is situated here.
