= Blumau-Neurißhof =

- Municipality
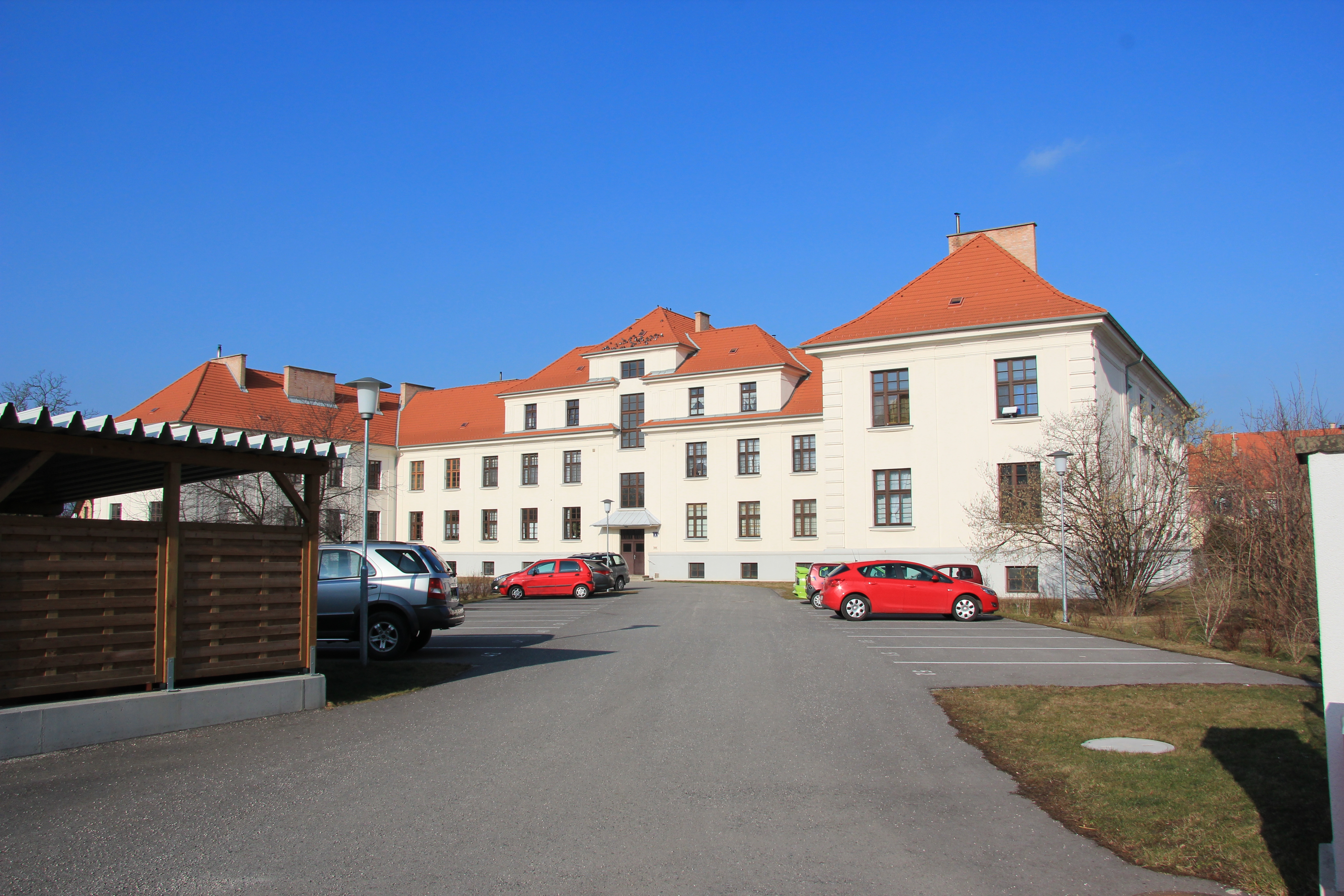
- The former Salvator caserne

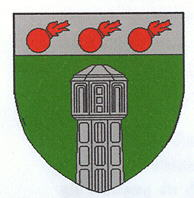
- Coat of arms

- Location within Austria
- Coordinates: 47°55′N 16°18′E
- Country: Austria
- State: Lower Austria
- District: Baden

Government
  - Mayor: René Klimes

Area
  - Total: 4.33 km^{2} (1.67 sq mi)
- Elevation: 252 m (827 ft)

Population (2018-01-01)
  - Total: 1,840
  - Density: 425/km^{2} (1,100/sq mi)
- Time zone: UTC+1 (CET)
  - Summer (DST): UTC+2 (CEST)
- Postal code: 2602
- Area code: 02682

Blumau-Neurißhof is a town in the district of Baden in Lower Austria in Austria.

== Population ==
Historical population
Year	Pop.	±%
1869	660	—
1880	689	+4.4%
1890	697	+1.2%
1900	662	−5.0%
1910	427	−35.5%
1923	1,828	+328.1%
1934	1,706	−6.7%
1939	1,676	−1.8%
1951	1,409	−15.9%
1961	1,344	−4.6%
1971	1,331	−1.0%
1981	1,250	−6.1%
1991	1,294	+3.5%
2001	1,657	+28.1%
2011	1,799	+8.6%
