= Oberwaltersdorf =

- Municipality
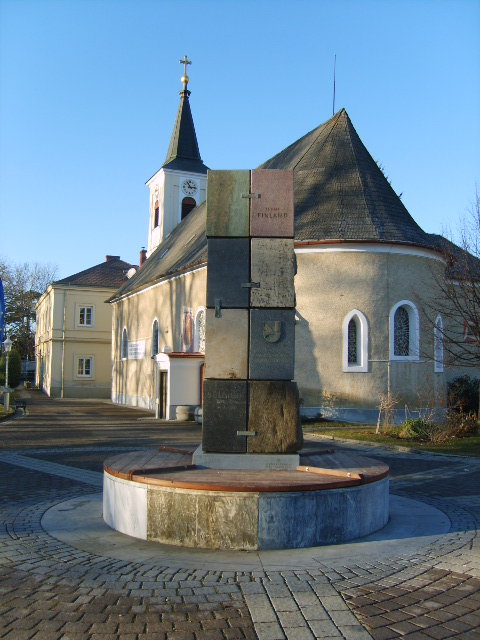
- The Europe Well and the parish church in Oberwaltersdorf

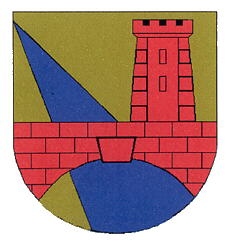
- Coat of arms

- Location within Austria
- Coordinates: 47°59′N 16°20′E
- Country: Austria
- State: Lower Austria
- District: Baden

Government
  - Mayor: Helene Auer

Area
  - Total: 13.58 km^{2} (5.24 sq mi)
- Elevation: 214 m (702 ft)

Population (2018-01-01)
  - Total: 4,618
  - Density: 340.1/km^{2} (880.7/sq mi)
- Time zone: UTC+1 (CET)
  - Summer (DST): UTC+2 (CEST)
- Postal code: 2522
- Area code: 02253
- Website: www.oberwaltersdorf.at

Oberwaltersdorf is a town in the district of Baden in Lower Austria in Austria.

== Population ==
Historical population
Year	Pop.	±%
1971	2,020	—
1981	2,030	+0.5%
1991	2,416	+19.0%
2001	3,343	+38.4%
2011	3,939	+17.8%
