= Baden District, Austria =

Coordinates: 48°00′12″N 16°13′52″E

Baden District Bezirk Baden
- District
- Country: Austria
- State: Lower Austria
- Number of municipalities: 30
- Administrative seat: Baden bei Wien

Government
  - District Governor: Christian Pehofer

Area
  - Total: 753.4 km^{2} (290.9 sq mi)

Population (2016-01-01)
  - Total: 143,657
  - Density: 190.7/km^{2} (493.9/sq mi)
- Time zone: UTC+01:00 (CET)
  - Summer (DST): UTC+02:00 (CEST)
- Vehicle registration: BN
- NUTS code: AT122

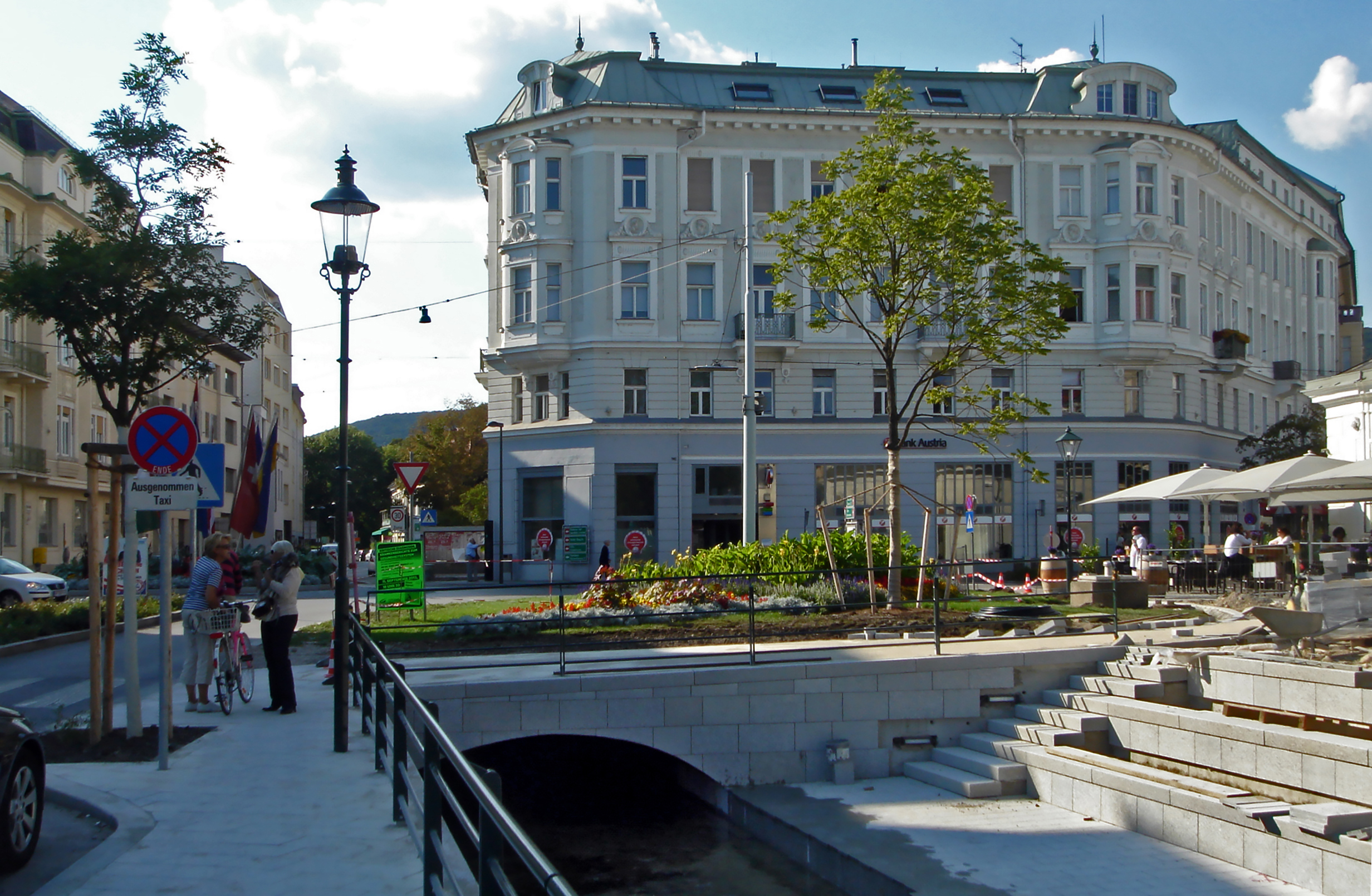
Baden bei Wien

Bezirk Baden is a district of the state of Lower Austria in Austria.

== Municipalities ==
Towns (Städte) are indicated in boldface; market towns (Marktgemeinden) in italics; suburbs, hamlets and other subdivisions of a municipality are indicated in small characters.

- Alland
  - Glashütten, Holzschlag, Rohrbach, Schwechatbach, Untermeierhof, Windhaag, Groisbach, Maria Raisenmarkt, Mayerling
- Altenmarkt an der Triesting
  - Altenmarkt, Kleinmariazell, Nöstach, Sulzbach, Thenneberg
- **Baden**
- **Bad Vöslau**
  - Bad Vöslau, Gainfarn, Großau
- **Berndorf**
  - Berndorf-Stadt, St.Veit, Ödlitz, Veitsau/Steinhof
- **Blumau-Neurißhof**
  - Blumau
- **Ebreichsdorf**
  - Ebreichsdorf, Schranawand, Unterwaltersdorf, Weigelsdorf
- Enzesfeld-Lindabrunn
- Furth an der Triesting
  - Aggsbach, Dürntal, Ebeltal, Eberbach, Furth, Guglhof, Hof, Maierhof, Niemtal, Rehgras, Steinwandgraben
- Günselsdorf
- Heiligenkreuz
  - Füllenberg, Heiligenkreuz, Preinsfeld, Sattelbach, Siegenfeld
- Hernstein
  - Aigen, Alkersdorf, Grillenberg, Hernstein, Kleinfeld, Neusiedl, Pöllau
- Hirtenberg
- Klausen-Leopoldsdorf
- Kottingbrunn
- Leobersdorf
- Mitterndorf an der Fischa
- Oberwaltersdorf
- Pfaffstätten
  - Einöde, Pfaffstätten
- Pottendorf
  - Landegg, Pottendorf, Siegersdorf, Wampersdorf
- Pottenstein
  - Fahrafeld, Grabenweg, Pottenstein
- Reisenberg
- Schönau an der Triesting
  - Dornau, Schönau an der Triesting, Siebenhaus
- Seibersdorf
  - Deutsch-Brodersdorf, Seibersdorf
- Sooß
- Tattendorf
- Teesdorf
- **Traiskirchen**
  - Möllersdorf, Oeynhausen, Traiskirchen, Tribuswinkel, Wienersdorf
- Trumau
- Weissenbach an der Triesting
  - Gadenweith, Kienberg, Neuhaus, Schwarzensee, Weissenbach
