= Progress in Polymer Science =

- Discipline: Macromolecular science
- Language: English
- Edited by: Jean-Francois Lutz, Chuanbing Tang, Ophelia Tsui and Ilhem Faiza Hakem

Publication details
- History: 1967-present
- Publisher: Elsevier
- Frequency: monthly
- Impact factor: 32.8 (2025)

Standard abbreviations
- ISO 4: Prog. Polym. Sci.

Indexing
- ISSN: 0079-6700

Links
- Journal homepage

Progress in Polymer Science is a peer-reviewed scientific journal publishing review articles on topics broadly related to polymer chemistry. The 2025 impact factor of this journal was 32.8, ranking it the highest in the subject category "Polymer Science". The journal is available since 1967. Currently it is edited by Editor-in-Chief Jean-Francois Lutz and Senior Editors Chuanbing Tang and Ophelia Tsui; Assistant Editor Ilhem Faiza Hakem. Honorary Editors-in-Chief include Krzysztof "Kris" Matyjaszewski and Guy C. Berry from Carnegie Mellon University.
