= Pfaffstätten =

- Municipality
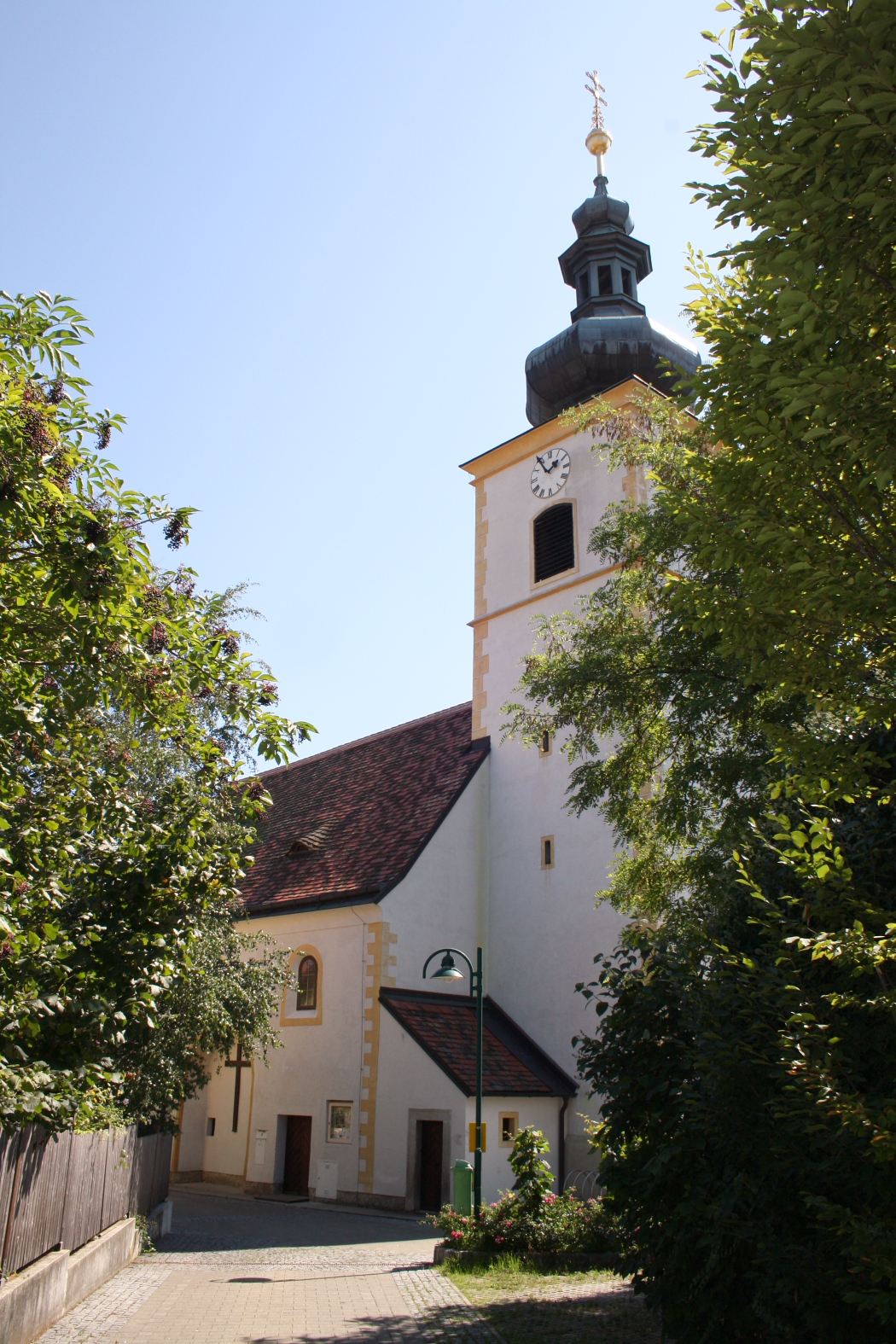
- Pfaffstättener parish church

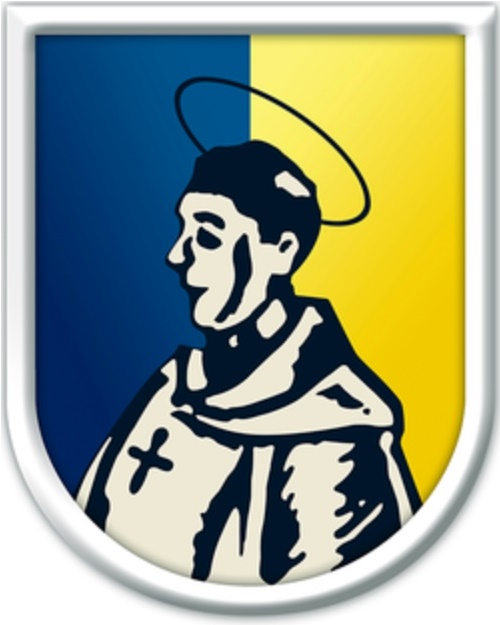
- Coat of arms

- Location within Austria
- Coordinates: 48°1′N 16°16′E
- Country: Austria
- State: Lower Austria
- District: Baden

Government
  - Mayor: Christoph Kainz

Area
  - Total: 7.81 km^{2} (3.02 sq mi)
- Elevation: 218 m (715 ft)

Population (2018-01-01)
  - Total: 3,551
  - Density: 455/km^{2} (1,180/sq mi)
- Time zone: UTC+1 (CET)
  - Summer (DST): UTC+2 (CEST)
- Postal code: 2511
- Area code: 02252
- Website: www.pfaffstaetten.at

Pfaffstätten is a town in the district of Baden in Lower Austria in Austria.

== Population ==
Historical population
Year	Pop.	±%
1971	2,603	—
1981	2,449	−5.9%
1991	2,461	+0.5%
2001	3,031	+23.2%
2011	3,411	+12.5%

== Sights ==
At the heart of the town is the Lilienfelderhof, a monastic grange owned by Lilienfeld Abbey, which is leased to the Kartause Gaming Private Foundation for 99 years, until 2105. Traditionally dated to 1209, this estate has played a central role in the history of Pfaffstätten and in the lives of its residents. Many inhabitants attended kindergarten there, found short- or long-term employment, or were married in the estate's church.

Pfaffstätten is also well known for its many Heuriger and the annual street fair, the Großheuriger Pfaffstätten, the biggest of its type in Austria, in which the local Heuriger of the town come together in a multi-day street festival.
