= 2020–21 Slovak Basketball League =

Basketball season

Extraliga
- Season: 2020–21
- Teams: 7

Finals
- Champions: Spišskí Rytieri (1st title)
- Runners-up: Patrioti Levice

The 2020–21 Slovak Basketball League season was the 29th season of the top-tier basketball competition in Slovakia. Spišskí Rytieri won its first ever Slovak championship. Rytieri also won the Slovak Basketball Cup, thus winning the double.

== Teams ==
Location of teams in 2020–21 Slovak Extraliga

Seven teams of the previous season are repeating participation in the league, while Slávia Žilina and Rieker Com Therm Komárno withdrew due to financial difficulties.

Team	City	Arena	Capacity
Handlová	Handlová	Športová Hala	1,200
Inter Bratislava	Bratislava	Hant Aréna	5,500
Iskra Svit	Svit	Iskra Aréna	700
Lučenec	Lučenec	Športová Hala Arena	900
Patrioti Levice	Levice	Športová Hala Levice	2,250
Prievidza	Prievidza	Niké Aréna	3,400
Spiš Knights	Spišská Nová Ves	Mestska Sportova Hala	1,160

== League Standings ==
Pos	Team	Pld	W	L	PF	PA	PD	Pts	Qualification or relegation
1	Patrioti Levice	36	22	14	2977	2902	+75	58	Qualification to playoffs
2	Spiš Knights	36	22	14	2948	2805	+143	58	Qualification to playoffs
3	Iskra Svit	36	20	16	3169	3115	+54	56	Qualification to playoffs
4	Inter Bratislava	36	19	17	2811	2757	+54	55	Qualification to playoffs
5	BKM Lučenec	36	18	18	2968	2898	+70	54	Qualification to playoffs
6	Prievidza	36	14	22	2792	3014	−222	50	Qualification to playoffs
7	MBK Baník Handlová	36	11	25	2903	3077	−174	47	

Updated to match(es) played on 11 April 2021. Source: Basket.sk

== Playoffs ==
=== Quarter-finals ===
Inter Bratislava vs. BKM Lučenec

14 April 2021

Inter Bratislava	85–75	BKM Lučenec

17 April 2021

BKM Lučenec	69–67	Inter Bratislava

21 April 2021

Inter Bratislava	85–68	BKM Lučenec
Inter Bratislava win series, 2-1

Iskra Svit vs. Prievidza

14 April 2021

Iskra Svit	110–107 (OT)	Prievidza

17 April 2021

Prievidza	98–82	Iskra Svit

21 April 2021

Iskra Svit	92–83	Prievidza
Iskra Svit win series, 2-1

=== Semi-finals ===
Patrioti Levice vs. Inter Bratislava

24 April 2021

Patrioti Levice	85–65	Inter Bratislava

28 April 2021

Inter Bratislava	63–78	Patrioti Levice

1 May 2021

Patrioti Levice	82–56	Inter Bratislava
Levice win series, 3-0

Spis Knights vs. Iskra Svit

24 April 2021

Spis Knights	93–83	Iskra Svit

28 April 2021

Iskra Svit	107–93	Spis Knights

1 May 2021

Spis Knights	113–87	Iskra Svit

5 May 2021

Iskra Svit	74–88	Spis Knights
Spis win series, 3-1

== Slovak clubs in Regional competitions ==
Team	Competition	Progress
Inter Bratislava	Alpe Adria Cup	
Levicki Patrioti	Alpe Adria Cup	
Lučenec	Alpe Adria Cup	
Spiš Knights	Alpe Adria Cup	
