= 2016–17 Slovak Basketball League =

Extraliga
- Season: 2016–17
- Teams: 11

Finals
- Champions: Inter Bratislava (4th title)
- Runners-up: Rieker Com Therm Komárno
- Third place: Košice
- Fourth place: Prievidza

The 2016–17 Slovak Basketball League season, for sponsorships reasons the Eurovia SBL, was the 25th season of this competition. Inter Bratislava won its fourth SBL championship after defeating Rieker Com Therm Komárno in the finals of the play-offs.

== Regular season ==
Pos	Team	Pld	W	L	PF	PA	PD	PCT	Qualification or relegation
1	Košice	40	34	6	3567	3004	+563	.850	Qualification to playoffs
2	Inter Bratislava	40	29	11	3554	3079	+475	.725	Qualification to playoffs
3	Prievidza	40	28	12	3528	3080	+448	.700	Qualification to playoffs
4	Levickí Patrioti	40	26	14	3413	3092	+321	.650	Qualification to playoffs
5	Rieker Com Therm Komárno	40	24	16	3538	3174	+364	.600	Qualification to playoffs
6	Iskra Svit	40	22	18	3455	3385	+70	.550	Qualification to playoffs
7	Lučenec	40	18	22	3255	3374	−119	.450	Qualification to playoffs
8	Handlová	40	17	23	3140	3327	−187	.425	Qualification to playoffs
9	VŠEMvs Karlovka Bratislava	40	10	30	2962	3344	−382	.250	
10	04 AC LB Spišská Nová Ves	40	9	31	3002	3501	−499	.225	
11	SPU Nitra	40	3	37	2718	3772	−1054	.075	

Source: Basket.sk, Mismarcadores.com

== Playoffs ==
Seeded teams played games 1, 3, 5 and 7 at home.

Quarter-finals
Košice	84	72	80	74	81
Handlová	82	79	71	80	80
Levickí Patrioti	79	74	95	86
Rieker Com Therm Komárno	98	103	91	104
Inter Bratislava	86	79	92
Lučenec	71	79	72
Prievidza	90	97	102
Iskra Svit	67	80	76

Semi-finals
Košice	81	87	82	80	65	54
Rieker Komárno	72	98	74	93	81	95
Inter Bratislava	78	74	99	79	104
Prievidza	90	68	94	77	75

Final
Rieker Komárno	70	64	73	86	82
Inter Bratislava	75	66	79	66	94

== Slovak clubs in European competitions ==
Team	Competition	Progress
Prievidza	Champions League	First qualifying round
Prievidza	FIBA Europe Cup	Second round
Rieker Komarno	Alpe Adria Cup	Champions
Levicki Patrioti	Alpe Adria Cup	Quarterfinals
