= 2019–20 Slovak Basketball League =

Extraliga
- Season: 2019–20
- Teams: 9

The 2019–20 Slovak Basketball League season was the 28th season of the top-tier basketball competition in Slovakia. It started on 5 October 2019 and ended prematurely on 13 March 2020 without any declared champion due to the coronavirus pandemic.

== Competition format ==
Ten teams joined the regular season, consisted in playing against each other four times home-and-away in double a round-robin format. The eight first qualified teams advance to the playoffs.

== Teams ==
Location of teams in 2019–20 Slovak Extraliga

The same nine teams of the previous season repeated participation in the league.

Team	City	Arena	Capacity
04 AC LB Spišská Nová Ves	Spišská Nová Ves		
Handlová	Handlová	Športová Hala	1,200
Inter Bratislava	Bratislava	Hant Aréna	5,500
Iskra Svit	Svit	Iskra Aréna	700
Lučenec	Lučenec	Športová Hala Arena	900
Patrioti Levice	Levice	Športová Hala Levice	2,250
Prievidza	Prievidza	Niké Aréna	3,400
Rieker Com Therm Komárno	Komárno	Mestská športová hala	1,475
Slávia Žilina	Žilina		

== Regular season ==
=== League table ===
Pos	Team	Pld	W	L	PF	PA	PD	PCT	Qualification or relegation
1	Inter Bratislava	28	23	5	2339	1936	+403	.821	Qualification to playoffs
2	Patrioti Levice	28	17	11	2262	2192	+70	.607	Qualification to playoffs
3	Prievidza	28	16	12	2199	2113	+86	.571	Qualification to playoffs
4	Lučenec	28	15	13	2253	2221	+32	.536	Qualification to playoffs
5	Slavia Žilina	27	14	13	2260	2294	−34	.519	Qualification to playoffs
6	Iskra Svit	28	14	14	2354	2350	+4	.500	Qualification to playoffs
7	Baník Handlová	27	9	18	2212	2324	−112	.333	Qualification to playoffs
8	04 AC LB Spišská Nová Ves	27	9	18	2199	2313	−114	.333	Qualification to playoffs
9	Rieker Com Therm Komárno	27	7	20	2118	2453	−335	.259	

Updated to match(es) played on 7 March 2020. Source: Basket.sk

=== Results ===
Home \ Away	SPI	HAN	INT	SVI	LUC	LEV	PRI	KOM	ZIL	SPI	HAN	INT	SVI	LUC	LEV	PRI	KOM	ZIL
04 AC LB Spišská Nová Ves	—	85–87	70–79	96–87	85–84	66–72	68–84	119–83	94–82	—	72–67		107–102	76–72	62–79	69–78	108–79	102–95
Baník Handlová	83–75	—	84–94	87–96	100–76	78–90	84–90	89–84	83–88		—		102–103	75–73	71–76	75–85	98–101	87–93
Inter Bratislava	95–67	86–90	—	84–64	81–66	89–66	88–75	95–77	77–73	93–77	106–61	—	84–73	93–61			88–62	
Iskra Svit	96–74	90–81	69–106	—	72–74	92–76	85–93	126–68	94–85	81–73	72–64	79–77	—		79–92	87–76		89–67
Lučenec	79–78	97–80	87–73	82–85	—	103–100	78–67	83–75	98–81		80–87	74–66	84–57	—		86–66	77–70	
Patrioti Levice	92–79	83–61	65–75	80–75	79–80	—	86–66	80–73	85–60		83–76	77–92		84–79	—	90–93		87–80
Prievidza	96–77	74–79	0–20	87–62	74–84	105–81	—	101–73	92–77			67–83		83–71	70–62	—	113–77	68–72
Rieker Com Therm Komárno	79–73	75–94	74–97	89–86	81–77	64–73	70–77	—	72–77	87–78			84–90	93–86	95–87	66–85	—	
Slávia Žilina	95–87	97–89	74–97	92–81	91–90	75–88	98–82	105–93	—			77–75	86–82	69–72	73–74		91–74	—

Updated to match(es) played on 7 March 2020. Source: Basket.sk
Legend: Blue = home team win; Red = away team win.

== Playoffs ==
Seeded teams played games 1, 3, 5 and 7 at home. Quarterfinals were played in a best-of-five games format while semifinals and final with a best-of-seven one.

=== Bracket ===
Quarter-finals

Semi-finals

Final

=== Quarter-finals ===
Team 1	Series	Team 2	Game 1	Game 2	Game 3	Game 4	Game 5

=== Semi-finals ===
Team 1	Series	Team 2	Game 1	Game 2	Game 3	Game 4	Game 5	Game 6	Game 7

=== Finals ===
Team 1	Series	Team 2	Game 1	Game 2	Game 3	Game 4	Game 5	Game 6	Game 7

== Slovak clubs in European competitions ==
Team	Competition	Progress
Inter Bratislava	Champions League	First qualifying round
Inter Bratislava	FIBA Europe Cup	Regular season

== Slovak clubs in Regional competitions ==
Team	Competition	Progress
Levicki Patrioti	Alpe Adria Cup	Regular season
