= 2018–19 Slovak Basketball League =

Extraliga
- Season: 2018–19
- Duration: 6 October 2018 – 1 June 2019
- Teams: 9

Finals
- Champions: Inter Bratislava (5th title)
- Runners-up: Prievidza
- Third place: Levicki Patrioti
- Fourth place: Iskra Svit

The 2018–19 Slovak Basketball League season will be the 27th season of the top-tier basketball competition in Slovakia. Levickí Patrioti are the defending champions.

== Competition format ==
Ten teams joined the regular season, consisted in playing against each other four times home-and-away in double a round-robin format. The eight first qualified teams advance to the playoffs.

== Teams ==
Location of teams in 2018–19 Slovak Extraliga

After the resignation of Košice, runner-up of the previous season, to continue playing in the league, Lučenec, champion of the 1.Liga, replaced them. Also, VŠEMvs Karlovka Bratislava resigned to the league thus reducing the number of teams to nine.

Team	City	Arena
04 AC LB Spišská Nová Ves	Spišská Nová Ves	
Handlová	Handlová	Športová Hala
Inter Bratislava	Bratislava	Hant Aréna
Iskra Svit	Svit	Iskra Aréna
Lučenec	Lučenec	
Levickí Patrioti	Levice	Športová Hala Levice
PP & TV Raj Žilina	Žilina	
Prievidza	Prievidza	Niké Aréna
Rieker Com Therm Komárno	Komárno	Mestská športová hala

== Regular season ==
=== League table ===
Pos	Team	Pld	W	L	PF	PA	PD	PCT	Qualification or relegation
1	Inter Bratislava	32	28	4	2706	2139	+567	.875	Qualification to playoffs
2	Levickí Patrioti	32	22	10	2633	2438	+195	.688	Qualification to playoffs
3	Prievidza	32	19	13	2504	2339	+165	.594	Qualification to playoffs
4	Iskra Svit	32	19	13	2634	2545	+89	.594	Qualification to playoffs
5	PP & TV Raj Žilina	32	15	17	2559	2640	−81	.469	Qualification to playoffs
6	Rieker Com Therm Komárno	32	13	19	2641	2625	+16	.406	Qualification to playoffs
7	Handlová	32	13	19	2504	2700	−196	.406	Qualification to playoffs
8	04 AC LB Spišská Nová Ves	32	9	23	2615	2897	−282	.281	Qualification to playoffs
9	Lučenec	32	6	26	2364	2837	−473	.188	

Source: Basket.sk

=== Results ===
Home \ Away	SPI	HAN	INT	SVI	LEV	LUC	ZIL	PRI	KOM	SPI	HAN	INT	SVI	LEV	LUC	ZIL	PRI	KOM
04 AC LB Spišská Nová Ves	—	79–93	65–91	74–109	78–84	89–65	88–101	80–73	91–85	—	89–75	64–86	93–99	94–99	86–104	96–83	87–79	105–100
Handlová	88–84	—	60–85	70–67	72–77	74–84	86–83	77–82	82–68	88–76	—	66–89	98–92	76–92	97–80	96–81	74–76	113–110
Inter Bratislava	105–66	98–50	—	69–58	79–72	92–50	104–71	70–67	86–62	87–73	105–49	—	73–68	84–82	109–73	95–60	79–66	63–69
Iskra Svit	97–72	85–81	79–88	—	80–79	91–85	94–72	79–62	84–71	90–67	78–74	72–85	—	80–83	107–83	87–73	63–74	90–86
Levickí Patrioti	91–68	68–57	87–69	83–64	—	97–71	84–76	87–86	93–65	95–76	90–87	66–72	94–85	—	98–64	84–65	55–75	81–78
Lučenec	76–89	72–77	82–88	88–92	75–93	—	57–66	59–96	59–71	90–85	78–83	57–89	82–78	91–77	—	79–90	91–88	76–86
PP & TV Raj Žilina	99–91	92–77	72–67	93–73	98–91	79–56	—	73–83	93–73	96–88	89–94	69–91	67–73	61–66	84–67	—	89–76	109–100
Prievidza	71–82	97–68	56–69	72–82	74–67	86–74	64–58	—	86–62	98–63	77–67	64–84	95–76	68–56	92–66	85–71	—	83–71
Rieker Com Therm Komárno	95–92	88–83	74–73	76–83	83–95	109–70	73–81	86–76	—	105–76	89–72	70–82	74–79	87–67	99–62	102–65	74–77	—

Source: Basket.sk
Legend: Blue = home team win; Red = away team win.

== Playoffs ==
Seeded teams played games 1, 3, 5 and 7 at home. Quarterfinals were played in a best-of-five games format while semifinals and final with a best-of-seven one.

=== Bracket ===
Quarter-finals
Inter Bratislava	3
04 AC LB Spišská Nová Ves	0
Iskra Svit	3
PP & TV Raj Žilina	1
Levickí Patrioti	3
Handlová	2
Prievidza	3
Rieker Com Therm Komárno	2

Semi-finals
Inter Bratislava	4
Iskra Svit	0
Levickí Patrioti	2
Prievidza	4

Final
Inter Bratislava	4
Prievidza	0

=== Quarter-finals ===
Team 1	Series	Team 2	Game 1	Game 2	Game 3	Game 4	Game 5
Inter Bratislava	3–0	04 AC LB Spišská Nová Ves	109–65	102–69	115–76		
Levickí Patrioti	3–2	Handlová	81–59	83–88	73–59	87–98	82–65
Prievidza	3–2	Rieker Com Therm Komárno	81–61	77–86	96–74	{68–72	103–81
Iskra Svit	3–1	PP & TV Raj Žilina	87–67	79–91	81–73	91–81	

=== Semi-finals ===
Team 1	Series	Team 2	Game 1	Game 2	Game 3	Game 4	Game 5	Game 6	Game 7
Inter Bratislava	4–0	Iskra Svit	93–91	95–74	114–48	85–63			
Levickí Patrioti	2–4	Prievidza	62–69	62–68	80–69	64–76	82–75	64–68	

=== Finals ===
Team 1	Series	Team 2	Game 1	Game 2	Game 3	Game 4	Game 5	Game 6	Game 7
Inter Bratislava	4–0	Prievidza	87–54	83–77	102–73	84–69			

== Slovak clubs in European competitions ==
Team	Competition	Progress
Levicki Patrioti	Alpe Adria Cup	Semifinals
