= Igor Marić (basketball) =

Croatian professional basketball player

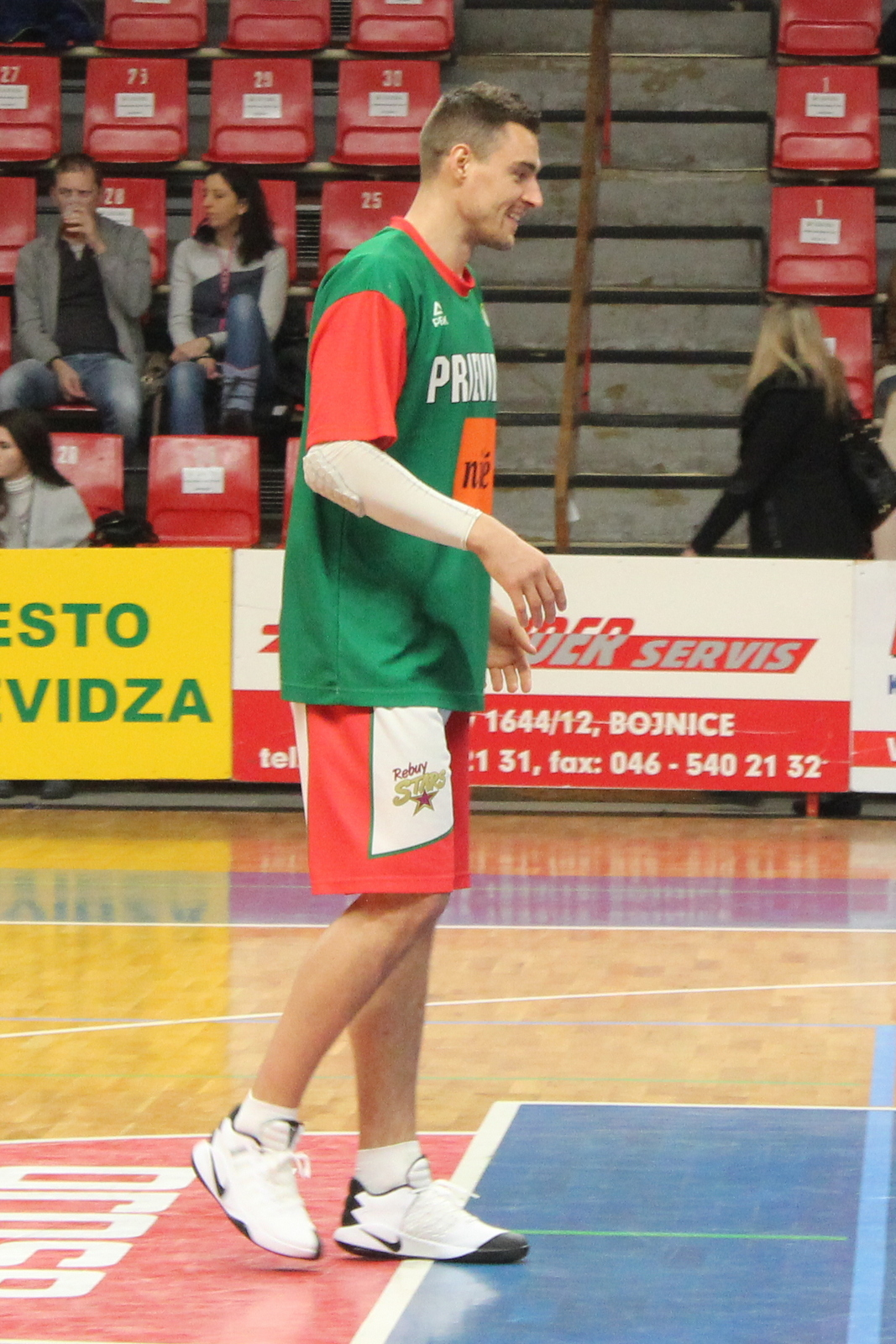

No. 7 – ÍA
- Position: Small forward
- League: 1. deild karla

Personal information
- Born: 23 July 1985 (age 41) Banja Luka, Bosnia and Herzegovina, Yugoslavia
- Listed height: 1.95 m (6 ft 5 in)

Career information
- Playing career: 2003–present

Career history
- 2003–2007: Dubrava
- 2007–2008: Zabok
- 2008–2010: Dubrava
- 2010–2011: Svjetlost Brod
- 2011–2012: Šentjur
- 2012–2013: Maribor
- 2013–2014: Helios
- 2014–2017: Prievidza
- 2017–2018: Košice
- 2018–2019: Cibona
- 2019–2020: USK Praha
- 2020–2021: Cibona
- 2021: Dubrava
- 2021–2022: ÍR
- 2022–2025: Keflavík
- 2026: Valur
- 2026–present: ÍA

Career highlights
- Croatian League champion (2019); Slovak League champion (2016); Icelandic Cup (2024); Icelandic Super Cup (2024); Slovak Cup winner (2018)

Igor Marić (born 23 July 1985) is a Croatian professional basketball player. Standing at 1.96 m, he plays at the small forward position. During his career, he has won the Slovak and Croatian national championships as well as the Slovak and Icelandic national Cups.

== Professional career ==
Marić grew up in the youth system of Dubrava. He played professionally there until the Summer of 2007, when he moved to Zabok, also playing in the Croatian League. After a season in Zabok he returned to Dubrava, where he spent another two seasons.

The 2010–11 season Marić spent in Svjetlost Brod, where he also played the Balkan League. In the Summer of 2011, Marić moved abroad for the first time. He signed for Šentjur of the Slovenian League. He was one of the leaders of the team and played at the 2012 Slovenian League All-Star game.

In the Summer of 2012, he moved to Maribor. He was one of the leaders of the team that reached the semifinals of the Slovenian League, where they were defeated by Olimpija. The next season he moved to Helios where he played under coach Zmago Sagadin.

Marić moved to the Slovak League in 2014. He played three seasons for Prievidza. In his first season his team lost in the 7th game of the Playoffs Final series of the 2014-15 Slovak League from Komárno. In his next season Prievidza became the champion and Marić won his first trophy. He was also named the best player of the League by website basket.sk.

In September 2016 Marić signed with Zadar. Meanwhile, FIBA banned Zadar on signing new players, so Marić never played an official match for the Croatian club. In October 2016 he returned to Prievidza.

In his third and final season in Prievidza, Marić made his debut in European competitions. In the 2016–17 FIBA Europe Cup, Marić averaged 12.9 points, 4.3 rebounds and 2.3 assists in 12 played matches.

In June 2017, Marić moved to Košice, another club competing in the Slovak League. He helped the club reach the finals of the 2017–18 Slovak League and win the 2018 Slovak Cup.

In August 2018, Marić returned to Croatia by signing with Cibona of the Croatian League and ABA League.

In July 2019, Marić moved to USK Praha of the Czech League. He averaged 11.5 points and 4.9 rebounds per game. On 17 July 2020 he re-joined Cibona.

In November 2021, Marić signed with ÍR of the Úrvalsdeild karla.

He remained in Iceland the following season, signing with Keflavík. On 23 March 2024, he won the Icelandic Basketball Cup with Keflavík.

On 28 September 2024, he won the Icelandic Super Cup after Keflavík defeated reigning national champions Valur 98–88 in the cup final.

In January 2026, he signed with Valur.

== Personal life ==
Marić was born and lived in Banja Luka until 1992, when his family had to flee to Zagreb because of the Bosnian War.
