= 2021–22 Czecho-Slovak Basketball Cup =

The 2021-22 Czecho-Slovak Basketball Cup is the first edition of this tournament, which is refounded after 18 years. .

The tournament is organised from 3 September to 11 September and consists of twelve teams (6 from Czech Republic and 6 from Slovakia) divided in four groups of three teams in Regular Season and Final Four afterwards. Draw was held on 16 July 2021.

== Teams ==
Regular season
(Czech Republic) JIP Pardubice	(Czech Republic) Geosan Kolín	(Slovakia) Inter Bratislava	(Slovakia) Spišski Rytieri
(Czech Republic) Opava	(Czech Republic) Olomoucko	(Slovakia) Levickí Patrioti	(Slovakia) Iskra Svit
(Czech Republic) Armex Děčín	(Czech Republic) USK Praha	(Slovakia) Lučenec	(Slovakia) Prievidza

== Regular season ==
=== Group A ===
Pos	Team	Pld	W	L	PF	PA	PD	Pts	Qualification	LUČ	LEV	KOL
1	(Slovakia) Lučenec	2	2	0	188	187	+1	4	Advance to semifinals	—		
2	(Slovakia) Levickí Patrioti	2	1	1	179	176	+3	3		77–88	—	
3	(Czech Republic) Geosan Kolín	2	0	2	187	202	−15	2		99–100	88–102	—

=== Group B ===
Pos	Team	Pld	W	L	PF	PA	PD	Pts	Qualification	USK	DEC	PRI
1	(Czech Republic) USK Praha	2	2	0	173	145	+28	4	Disqualified	—		90–64
2	(Czech Republic) Armex Děčín	2	1	1	170	136	+34	3	Advance to semifinals	81–83	—	89–53
3	(Slovakia) Prievidza	2	0	2	117	179	−62	2				—

=== Group C ===
Pos	Team	Pld	W	L	PF	PA	PD	Pts	Qualification	SPI	PAR	OLO
1	(Slovakia) Spišski Rytieri	2	2	0	153	148	+5	4	Advance to semifinals	—	83–80	
2	(Czech Republic) JIP Pardubice	2	1	1	168	157	+11	3			—	
3	(Czech Republic) Olomoucko	2	0	2	142	158	−16	2		68–70	74–88	—

=== Group D ===
Pos	Team	Pld	W	L	PF	PA	PD	Pts	Qualification	OPA	ISK	INT
1	(Czech Republic) Opava	2	2	0	184	141	+43	4	Advance to semifinals	—	104–67	80–74
2	(Slovakia) Iskra Svit	2	1	1	147	183	−36	3			—	
3	(Slovakia) Inter Bratislava	2	0	2	153	160	−7	2			79–80	—

== Final Four ==
Semi-finals
10 September – Lučenec
(Czech Republic) Opava	103
(Czech Republic) Armex Děčín	75
10 September – Lučenec
(Slovakia) Lučenec	86
(Slovakia) Spišski Rytieri	88

Final
11 September – Lučenec
(Czech Republic) Opava	95
(Slovakia) Spišski Rytieri	68
Third place
11 September – Lučenec
(Slovakia) Lučenec	101
(Czech Republic) Armex Děčín	63
