= Aramis Naglić =

Croatian basketball coach and player

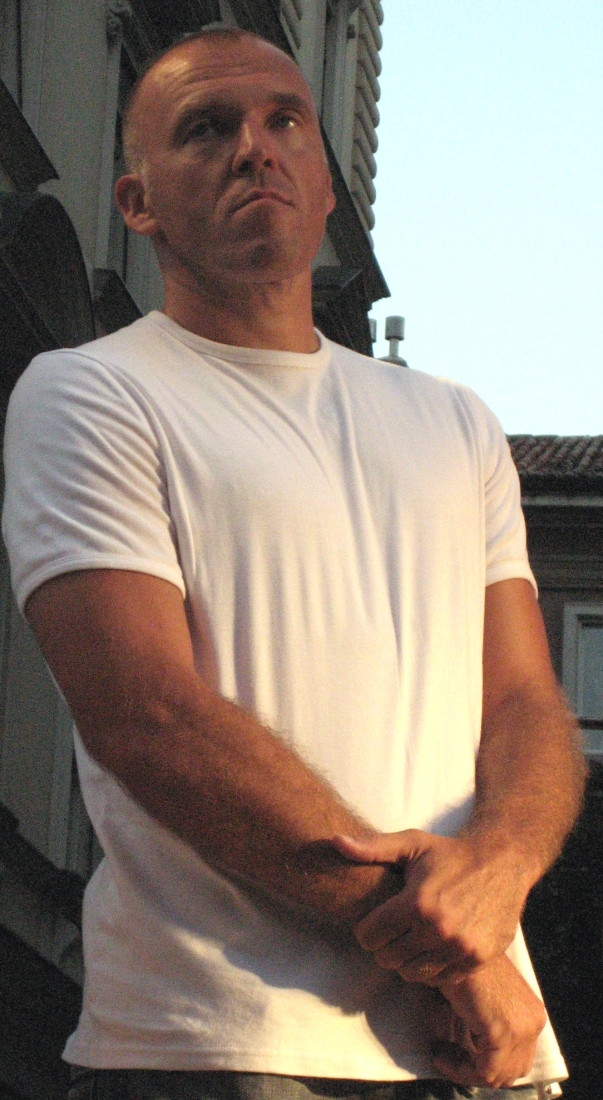
- Naglić in 2008

Inter Bratislava
- Title: Head coach
- League: Slovak Basketball League

Personal information
- Born: 28 August 1965 (age 61) Rijeka, SR Croatia, SFR Yugoslavia
- Listed height: 6 ft 7.92 in (2.03 m)

Career information
- NBA draft: 1987: undrafted
- Playing career: 1983–2005
- Position: Power forward
- Coaching career: 2007–present

Career history

Playing
- 1983–1989: Kvarner
- 1989–1993: Jugoplastika / Pop 84
- 1993–1994: Reyer Venezia
- 1994–1997: Kantrida
- 1997–1998: Cibona
- 1998–1999: Zadar
- 1999–2002: Slovakofarma
- 2002–2004: Traiskirchen Lions
- 2003: → Slovakofarma
- 2004–2005: Zadar

Coaching
- 2007–2008: Crikvenica
- 2010–2011: Kvarner 2010
- 2012–2013: Inter Bratislava
- 2015–2016: Škrljevo
- 2015: Croatia (assistant)
- 2017–2018: Zadar
- 2019–2020: Inter Bratislava
- 2021–2024: Vienna
- 2024–present: Inter Bratislava
- 2025–present: Austria

Career highlights
- As player: 2× Euroleague champion (1990, 1991); 2× Yugoslav League champion (1990, 1991); 2× Croatian League champion (1998, 2005); 3× Slovak League champion (2000–2002); 2× Yugoslav Cup winner (1990, 1991); 3× Croatian Cup winner (1992, 1993, 2005); 2× Slovak Cup winner (2000, 2002); As head coach: 2× Slovak League champion (2013, 2019); Austrian League champion (2022); Austrian Cup winner (2022)
Medals
Men's basketball
Representing Croatia
Olympic Games
Silver medal – second place	1992 Barcelona	Team

Aramis Naglić (born 28 August 1965) is a Croatian professional basketball coach and former player who is the head coach for Inter Bratislava of the Slovak League.

His most important trophies as a player include the silver medal with the Croatia national team at the 1992 Summer Olympics, and two European Cup titles with Jugoplastika Split.

== Coaching career ==
After a 22-year-long playing career, Naglić started his coaching career. He coached Goranin, Crikvenica and Kvarner 2010 before taking over Inter Bratislava which he led to the 2013 Slovak League title.

In 2015, following the appointment of Velimir Perasović as the head coach of the Croatian national team, Naglić joined his staff as an assistant coach. As Croatia was eliminated in round 16 game of the 2015 EuroBasket, Perasović with his staff was fired. He also worked as the head coach of Škrljevo in the Croatian League for the one season. In 2017, Croatian club Zadar appointed Naglić as their new head coach. He left Zadar in June 2018.

In February 2019, Naglić was named the head coach of Inter Bratislava for the second time in his coaching career. In June 2020, he left the club.

In January, 2021, Naglić signed with Vienna of the Austrian League.

In June, 2024, Naglić returned to Inter Bratislava of the Slovak League.
