= 2017–18 Slovak Basketball League =

Extraliga
- Season: 2017–18
- Teams: 10

Finals
- Champions: Levickí Patrioti (2nd title)
- Runners-up: Košice
- Third place: Inter Bratislava
- Fourth place: MBK Rieker Komarno

The 2017–18 Slovak Basketball League season was the 26th season of the top-tier basketball competition in Slovakia. Inter Bratislava was the defending champion, but was eliminated in the semifinals. Levickí Patrioti won their second league.

== Competition format ==
Ten teams joined the regular season, consisted in playing against each other four times home-and-away in double a round-robin format. The eight first qualified teams advance to the playoffs.

== Teams ==
Location of teams in 2017–18 Slovak Extraliga

Lučenec and SPU Nitra did not continue in the Extraliga. Žilina, champion of the 1.Liga, replaced them.

Team	City	Arena
04 AC LB Spišská Nová Ves	Spišská Nová Ves	
Handlová	Handlová	Športová Hala
Inter Bratislava	Bratislava	Hant Aréna
Iskra Svit	Svit	Iskra Aréna
Košice	Košice	
Levickí Patrioti	Levice	
Prievidza	Prievidza	Niké Aréna
Rieker Com Therm Komárno	Komárno	Mestská športová hala
VŠEMvs Karlovka Bratislava	Bratislava	
Žilina	Žilina	

== Regular season ==
Pos	Team	Pld	W	L	PF	PA	PD	PCT	Qualification or relegation
1	Inter Bratislava	36	30	6	3370	2801	+569	.833	Qualification to playoffs
2	Levickí Patrioti	36	26	10	3175	2832	+343	.722	Qualification to playoffs
3	Prievidza	36	25	11	3246	2792	+454	.694	Qualification to playoffs
4	Košice	36	25	11	3390	2952	+438	.694	Qualification to playoffs
5	Iskra Svit	36	22	14	3265	3010	+255	.611	Qualification to playoffs
6	Rieker Com Therm Komárno	36	22	14	3087	2995	+92	.611	Qualification to playoffs
7	VŠEMvs Karlovka Bratislava	36	12	24	2811	2995	−184	.333	Qualification to playoffs
8	Handlová	36	9	27	2801	3375	−574	.250	Qualification to playoffs
9	Žilina	36	5	31	2837	3547	−710	.139	
10	04 AC LB Spišská Nová Ves	36	4	32	2756	3439	−683	.111	

Source: Basket.sk

== Playoffs ==
Seeded teams played games 1, 3, 5 and 7 at home. Quarterfinals were played in a best-of-five games format while semifinals and final with a best-of-seven one.

Quarter-finals
Inter Bratislava	98	100	96
Handlová	64	86	68
Košice	102	73	84	72	94
Iskra Svit	89	78	68	81	85
Levickí Patrioti	85	91	91
VŠEMvs Karlovka Bratislava	69	91	60
Prievidza	71	63	74
Rieker Com Therm Komárno	78	67	80

Semi-finals
Inter Bratislava	87	68	81	75	103	86
Košice	62	74	90	95	85	97
Levickí Patrioti	81	92	67	86	89
Rieker Com Therm Komárno	60	95	65	57	81

Final
Košice	81	79	66	77	66
Levickí Patrioti	80	82	72	81	81

== Slovak clubs in Regional competitions ==
Team	Competition	Progress
Levicki Patrioti	Alpe Adria Cup	Runners-up
Prievidza	Alpe Adria Cup	Regular season
Rieker Com Therm Komarno	Alpe Adria Cup	Regular season
