= 2008–09 CEBL =

2008 European basketball season

The Central European Basketball League, or CEBL for short, was a basketball tournament with Central European basketball teams.

In the 2008/2009 inaugural season, teams from the following five countries participated: Czech Republic, Austria, Romania, Hungary and Slovakia.

After the group rounds, Final Four was held in Timișoara, Romania. In the final match, Albacomp Fehervar won against BCM Elba Timișoara.

== Teams ==
Country	Number of teams	Teams
Slovakia	4	Skanska Pezinok, Spisska Nova Ves, MBK Handlová, BK Inter Bratislava.
Austria	3	Kapfenberg Bulls, Xion Dukes Klosterneuburg, UKJ BC Mollersdorf Traiskirchen.
Czech Republic	2	Geofin Novy Jicin, BK Opava.
Hungary	2	Marso-Vagép, Albacomp Fehérvár.
Romania	1	BCM Elba Timișoara.

== Regular season ==
=== Group A ===
Pos	Team	Pld	W	L	PF	PA	PD	Pts	Qualification	TIM	MAR	TRA	PEZ
1	(Romania) Elba Timisoara	6	4	2	559	517	+42	10	Advance to quarterfinals	—	94–73	88–75	84–69
2	(Hungary) Marso-Vagép	6	4	2	536	530	+6	10		89–82	—	98–85	103–95
3	(Austria) Mollersdorf Traiskirchen	6	3	3	558	572	−14	9		95–99	106–95	—	95–93
4	(Slovakia) Skanska Pezinok	6	1	5	540	574	−34	7		116–109	68–78	99–102	—

=== Group B ===
Pos	Team	Pld	W	L	PF	PA	PD	Pts	Qualification	FEH	JIC	KLO	SNV
1	(Hungary) Albacomp Fehérvár	6	4	2	542	490	+52	10	Advance to quarterfinals	—	102–70	80–70	102–76
2	(Czech Republic) Geofin Novy Jicin	6	4	2	502	448	+54	10	Advance to quarterfinals	98–72	—	93–74	96–58
3	(Austria) Xion Dukes Klosterneuburg	6	3	3	478	469	+9	9		93–63	77–67	—	88–63
4	(Slovakia) Spisska Nova Ves	6	1	5	428	543	−115	7		83–103	65–78	83–76	—

=== Group C ===
Pos	Team	Pld	W	L	PF	PA	PD	Pts	Qualification	KAP	OPA	HAN	INT
1	(Austria) Kapfenberg Bulls	6	6	0	551	473	+78	12	Advance to quarterfinals	—	97–95	97–85	105–67
2	(Czech Republic) Opava	6	2	4	537	529	+8	8		63–69	—	104–110	108–84
3	(Slovakia) MBK Handlová	6	2	4	522	558	−36	8		74–93	85–76	—	92–100
4	(Slovakia) BK Inter Bratislava	6	2	4	512	562	−50	8		89–90	84–91	88–76	—

== Final Four ==
Semifinals; 10 January
1	(Romania) Elba Timișoara	90
4	(Czech Republic) Geofin Novy Jicin	87
3	(Hungary) Albacomp Fehérvár	79
2	(Austria) Kapfenberg Bulls	64

Final; 11 January
(Hungary) Albacomp Fehérvár	92
(Romania) Elba Timișoara	66
