= Czechoslovak basketball clubs in international competitions =

Czechoslovak basketball clubs in European and worldwide competitions is the performance record of men's professional basketball clubs from the former country of Czechoslovakia's top-tier level league, the Czechoslovak Basketball League, that played in international basketball tournaments.

== The finals ==
Season	Champion	Result	Runner-up	Date	Venue	
FIBA European Champions Cup & EuroLeague (1st tier)
1963–64	Real Madrid (Spain)	183–174 (two-leg)	(Czechoslovakia) Spartak ZJŠ Brno	29/04 & 10/05/1964	Ice Rink, Brno	Frontón Vista Alegre, Madrid
1965–66	Simmenthal Milano (Italy)	77–72	(Czechoslovakia) Slavia VŠ Praha	01/04/1966	Palazzo dello Sport, Bologna	
1967–68	Real Madrid (Spain)	98–95	(Czechoslovakia) Spartak ZJŠ Brno	11/04/1968	Palais des Sports de Gerland, Lyon	
FIBA Saporta Cup (2nd tier)
1967–68	AEK (Greece)	89–82	(Czechoslovakia) Slavia VŠ Praha	04/04/1968	Panathenaic Kalimarmaro Stadium, Athens	
1968–69	Slavia VŠ Praha (Czechoslovakia)	80–74	(Soviet Union) Dinamo Tbilisi	17/04/1969	Wiener Stadthalle, Vienna	
1973–74	Crvena zvezda (Socialist Federal Republic of Yugoslavia)	86–75	(Czechoslovakia) Spartak ZJŠ Brno	02/04/1974	Palasport Primo Carnera, Udine	
FIBA Intercontinental Cup
1969	Akron Goodyear Wingfoots (United States)	84–71	(Czechoslovakia) Spartak ZJŠ Brno	26/01/1969	Macon Coliseum, Macon	

== FIBA European Champions Cup (1st tier) ==
=== Season to season ===
Year	Team	_______ Earlier stage _______	________ Last 24 to 32 ________	________ Last 12 to 16 ________	_________ Last 6 to 8 _________	_________ Semifinals _________	____________ Final ____________
1958	Slovan Orbis Praha		(Switzerland) Jonction	3rd of 3 teams			
1958–59	Spartak ZJŠ Brno			(Poland) Lech Poznań			
1959–60	Slovan Orbis Praha			(Switzerland) Urania Genève Sport	(France) Chorale Mulsant	(Soviet Union) Rīgas ASK	
1960–61	Spartak Praha Sokolovo		(Netherlands) The Wolves Amsterdam	(Finland) Torpan Pojat	(Romania) Steaua București		
1961–62	Iskra Svit			(Hungary) Honvéd			
1962–63	Spartak ZJŠ Brno		(Belgium) Antwerpse	(Finland) Helsingin Kisa-Toverit	(Socialist Federal Republic of Yugoslavia) AŠK Olimpija	(Spain) Real Madrid	
1963–64	Spartak ZJŠ Brno		(Austria) Wiener	(Israel) Maccabi Tel Aviv	(Romania) Steaua București	(Socialist Federal Republic of Yugoslavia) OKK Beograd	(Spain) Real Madrid
1964–65	Spartak ZJŠ Brno			(East Germany) Chemie Halle	(Italy) Ignis Varese		
1965–66	Slavia VŠ Praha		(Denmark) Gladsaxe Efterslægten	(Hungary) Honvéd	1st of 4 teams	(Greece) AEK	(Italy) Simmenthal Milano
1966–67	Slavia VŠ Praha			(Romania) Steaua București	2nd of 4 teams	(Italy) Simmenthal Milano	(Socialist Federal Republic of Yugoslavia) AŠK Olimpija (4th)
1967–68	Spartak ZJŠ Brno			(Turkey) Altınordu	1st of 4 teams	(Italy) Simmenthal Milano	(Spain) Real Madrid
1968–69	Spartak ZJŠ Brno			(Romania) Dinamo București	1st of 4 teams	(Soviet Union) CSKA Moscow	
1969–70	Slavia VŠ Praha			(Austria) Engelmann Wien	2nd of 4 teams	(Soviet Union) CSKA Moscow	
1970–71	Slavia VŠ Praha		(Denmark) Virum	(Turkey) İTÜ	2nd of 4 teams	(Soviet Union) CSKA Moscow	
1971–72	Slavia VŠ Praha			(Finland) Tapion Honka	3rd of 4 teams		
1972–73	Slavia VŠ Praha		(Portugal) Porto	(France) ASVEL	4th of 4 teams		
1973–74	Dukla Olomouc		(Finland) Turun NMKY	(Bulgaria) Academic			
1974–75	Slavia VŠ Praha		(Egypt) Al-Zamalek	6th of 6 teams			
1975–76	Dukla Olomouc		(Switzerland) Federale				
1976–77	Spartak-Zbrojovka Brno		1st of 4 teams	Not played	6th of 6 teams		
1977–78	Zbrojovka Brno		2nd of 4 teams				
1978–79	Zbrojovka Brno		2nd of 4 teams				
1979–80	Inter Slovnaft		2nd of 3 teams				
1980–81	Inter Slovnaft		3rd of 4 teams				
1981–82	Slavia VŠ Praha		2nd of 4 teams				
1982–83	VŠ Praha		(Finland) Turun NMKY				
1983–84	Inter Slovnaft		(Albania) Partizani Tirana				
1984–85	Rudá hvězda Pardubice		(Turkey) Efes Pilsen				
1985–86	Inter Slovnaft		(Soviet Union) Žalgiris				
1986–87	Zbrojovka Brno		(Sweden) Alvik	(Spain) Real Madrid			
1987–88	Zbrojovka Brno		(England) Portsmouth	(Netherlands) Nashua EBBC			
1988–89	Zbrojovka Brno		(Turkey) Eczacıbaşı	(France) Limoges CSP			
1989–90	Baník Cigel' Prievidza		(Sweden) Täby	(Spain) FC Barcelona			
1990–91	Zbrojovka Brno		(Sweden) Scania Södertälje				
1991–92	USK Praha	(Cyprus) Pezoporikos Larnaca					
1992–93	USK Praha	(Romania) Universitatea Cluj	(Spain) Estudiantes Argentaria				

== FIBA European Cup Winners' Cup (2nd tier) ==
=== Season to season ===
Year	Team	_______ Earlier stage _______	___________ Last 48 ___________	________ Last 24 to 32 ________	________ Last 12 to 16 ________	_________ Last 6 to 8 _________	_________ Semifinals _________	____________ Final ____________
1966–67	Spartak ZJŠ Brno				(Luxembourg) Diekirch	(Belgium) Royal IV	(Italy) Ignis Varese	
1967–68	Slavia VŠ Praha				(West Germany) VfL Osnabrück	(Socialist Federal Republic of Yugoslavia) AŠK Olimpija	(East Germany) Vorwärts Leipzig	(Greece) AEK
1968–69	Slavia VŠ Praha				(Finland) Helsingin Kisa-Toverit	(Poland) Legia Warsaw	(Socialist Federal Republic of Yugoslavia) AŠK Olimpija	(Soviet Union) Dinamo Tbilisi
1969–70	Iskra Svit				(Belgium) Standard Liège			
1970–71	Dukla Olomouc			(Netherlands) Flamingo's Haarlem	(Socialist Federal Republic of Yugoslavia) Zadar			
1971–72	Spartak ZJŠ Brno			(Luxembourg) Arantia Larochette	(Italy) Fides Napoli			
1972–73	Spartak ZJŠ Brno			(Austria) Mounier Wels	(Greece) Olympiacos	3rd of 3 teams		
1973–74	Spartak ZJŠ Brno			(England) Embassy All Stars	(Belgium) Royal IV	1st of 3 teams	(Italy) Saclà Asti	(Socialist Federal Republic of Yugoslavia) Crvena zvezda
1974–75	Dukla Olomouc			(Luxembourg) T71 Dudelange	(Socialist Federal Republic of Yugoslavia) Jugoplastika			
1975–76	Slavia VŠ Praha			(Syria) Al-Wahda Damascus	(West Germany) SSV Hagen			
1976–77	Slavia VŠ Praha			(Greece) AEK	(Belgium) Ijsboerke Kortrijk	4th of 4 teams		
1977–78	Slavia VŠ Praha				(Netherlands) Falcon Jeans EBBC			
1978–79	Dukla Olomouc			(Hungary) Vasas	(Socialist Federal Republic of Yugoslavia) Radnički Belgrade			
1979–80
1980–81
1981–82	Inter Slovnaft				(Belgium) Hellas Gent	4th of 4 teams		
1982–83	Inter Slovnaft				(Austria) Klosterneuburg	3rd of 4 teams		
1983–84	Rudá hvězda Pardubice			(Portugal) Queluz Pioneer	(Finland) Turun NMKY	4th of 4 teams		
1984–85	Nová huť Ostrava				(Austria) Landys&Gyr Wien			
1985–86	Chemosvit			(Turkey) Fenerbahçe	(France) Stade Français			
1986–87	Nová huť Ostrava			(Cyprus) APOEL	(Finland) KTP	4th of 4 teams		
1987–88
1988–89
1989–90
1990–91
1991–92	Sparta Praha		(Greece) Panionios					
1992–93	Bioveta Brno	(Netherlands) Pro-Specs EBBC						
1992–93	USK Praha			(Russia) CSKA Moscow				

== FIBA Korać Cup (3rd tier) ==
=== Season to season ===
Year	Team	_______ Earlier stage _______	________ Last 64 to 48 ________	________ Last 24 to 32 ________	________ Last 12 to 16 ________	_________ Last 6 to 8 _________	_________ Semifinals _________	____________ Final ____________
1972
1973
1973–74
1974–75
1975–76
1976–77
1977–78	Inter Slovnaft			(Turkey) Şeker	4th of 4 teams			
1978–79	Slavia VŠ Praha			(West Germany) Wolfenbüttel	3rd of 4 teams			
1978–79	Inter Slovnaft			(Poland) ŁKS Łódź	2nd of 4 teams			
1979–80
1980–81	Zbrojovka Brno			(France) Stade Français	2nd of 4 teams			
1980–81	Slavia VŠ Praha			(Belgium) Sunair Oostende				
1981–82	Zbrojovka Brno			(Italy) Latte Sole Bologna				
1982–83	Nová huť Ostrava		(Turkey) Efes Pilsen	(Switzerland) Vevey	4th of 4 teams			
1983–84
1984–85
1985–86
1986–87
1987–88	Nová huť Ostrava		(Austria) UBC Mattersburg	(Italy) Dietor Bologna				
1987–88	Inter Slovnaft		(Cyprus) Olympia Nicosia	(Israel) Hapoel Tel Aviv				
1988–89	Inter Slovnaft		(Italy) Allibert Livorno	(Israel) Hapoel Tel Aviv				
1988–89	VŠ Praha		(Italy) Wiwa Vismara Cantù					
1989–90	Sparta Praha		(Switzerland) Bellinzona					
1989–90	Inter Slovnaft		(Denmark) Værløse	(Soviet Union) SKA Alma-Ata				
1990–91	Sparta Praha		(Greece) Panathinaikos					
1990–91	Inter Slovnaft		(Austria) Citroën Klagenfurt					
1990–91	Baník Cígeľ Prievidza		(Soviet Union) Kalev					
1991–92	Baník Cígeľ Prievidza		(Turkey) Çukurova Üniversitesi					
1991–92	BVC Bioveta Brno		(Germany) TBB Trier					
1991–92	Slavia VŠDS Žilina		(Hungary) Tungsram					
1991–92	Baník Handlová		(Greece) Iraklis Thessaloniki					
1992–93	Baník Cígeľ Prievidza	(Bulgaria) Akademik Varna	(Spain) Taugrés					
1992–93	Sparta Praha		(Greece) Fyrogenis AEK					
1992–93	Nová huť Ostrava		(Federal Republic of Yugoslavia) Vojvodina	(Greece) Chipita Panionios				
1992–93	TTS Trenčín		(Poland) Stal Bobrek Bytom					

== See also ==
European basketball clubs in European and worldwide competitions from:

- Croatia
- France
- Greece
- Israel
- Italy
- Russia
- Slovakia
- Spain
- Turkey
- USSR
- Yugoslavia
