= Saša Avramović =

Serbian basketball player

Personal information
- Born: January 16, 1993 (age 33) Čačak, FR Yugoslavia
- Listed height: 6 ft 4 in (1.93 m)
- Listed weight: 200 lb (91 kg)

Career information
- NBA draft: 2015: undrafted
- Playing career: 2010–present
- Position: Point guard

Career history
- 2010–2011: Mladost Čačak
- 2011–2014: Mega Vizura
- 2014–2015: Kumanovo
- 2015–2016: Slávia TU Košice
- 2016: Vršac
- 2017–2023: Iskra Svit

Career highlights
- Slovak league Top scorer (2018)
Medals
Representing Serbia
Men's basketball
U18 European Championship
| Silver medal – second place | 2011 Poland | U18 National Team |
U16 European Championship
| Bronze medal – third place | 2009 Lithuania | U16 National Team |
Men's Basketball 3x3
Youth Olympic Games
| Gold medal – first place | 2010 Singapore | Team competition |

Saša Avramović (born January 16, 1993) is a Serbian professional basketball player who last played for Iskra Svit.
