= Naje Smith =

American basketball player (born 2000)

No. 23 – Prievidza
- Position: Small forward
- League: Extraliga

Personal information
- Born: April 5, 2000 (age 26) Spokane, Washington, U.S.
- Listed height: 2.03 m (6 ft 8 in)
- Listed weight: 93 kg (205 lb)

Career information
- High school: Lewis and Clark (Spokane, Washington)
- College: Cochise College (2018–2020); Boise State (2020–2023)
- NBA draft: 2023: undrafted
- Playing career: 2023–present

Career history
- 2023–2024: Argeș Pitești
- 2024–2025: Kataja
- 2025–present: Prievidza

Naje Abdean Smith (born 5 April 2000) is an American professional basketball player who plays as a small forward for Prievidza in Slovak Basketball League.

== Professional career ==
After starting his professional career with Romanian team Argeș Pitești in 2023, Smith joined Finnish Korisliiga team Kataja in August 2024.

At the end of July 2025, he signed with Prievidza in Slovak Basketball League.

In the 2025/2026 season Naje Smith was named a Slovak Basketball League All-Star, won the All-Star Game Slam Dunk Contest, and won the Slovak Basketball Cup.
