= Miloš Babić =

Serbian basketball player and coach (born 1968)

Miloš Babić Милош Бабић
Tennessee Tech Golden Eagles
- Title: Assistant coach
- League: Ohio Valley Conference

Personal information
- Born: November 3, 1968 (age 58) Kraljevo, SR Serbia, SFR Yugoslavia
- Listed height: 7 ft 0 in (2.13 m)
- Listed weight: 240 lb (109 kg)

Career information
- College: Tennessee Tech (1987–1990)
- NBA draft: 1990: 2nd round, 50th overall pick
- Drafted by: Phoenix Suns
- Playing career: 1990–2002
- Position: Power forward / center
- Number: 00
- Coaching career: 2024–present

Career history

Playing
- 1990–1991: Cleveland Cavaliers
- 1991: Miami Heat
- 1991–1992: Peñarol de Mar del Plata
- 1992–1993: AEK Athens
- 1993–1994: Sloga
- 1994–1995: Prievidza
- 1995: Žalgiris Kaunas
- 1995: Sakalai
- 1996: Fuenlabrada
- 1996–1997: Prievidza
- 1997–1998: Pezinok
- 1998–1999: Zastal Zielona Góra
- 1999–2000: Maccabi Kiryat Motzkin
- 2000–2001: Antwerp Diamond Giants
- 2002: Casino Ginásio
- 2002: CAB Madeira

Coaching
- 2024-present: Tennessee Tech (assistant)

Career highlights
- Slovak Extraliga champion (1998)
- Stats at NBA.com
- Stats at Basketball Reference

Miloš Babić (Serbian Cyrillic: Милош Бабић; born November 23, 1968) is a Serbian basketball coach and former player. He was a 7'0" 240 lb power forward/center during his playing days, and now serves as an assistant coach at Tennessee Tech University.

== Playing career ==
Babić played collegiate basketball for Tennessee Tech University in Cookeville, Tennessee for 3 seasons (1987/88-1989/90).

He was selected by the Phoenix Suns in the second round (50th pick overall) of the 1990 NBA draft before being immediately traded to the Cleveland Cavaliers for Stefano Rusconi, who was drafted with the 52nd pick by Cleveland.

Babić played in the National Basketball Association (NBA) for two seasons, appearing in 21 games for the Cleveland Cavaliers (1990–91) and Miami Heat (1991–92). He averaged 1.8 points and 1.0 rebounds

== Coaching career ==
In 2024 Babić returned to Tennessee Tech as an assistant coach.

== NBA career statistics ==
Legend
GP	Games played	GS	Games started	MPG	Minutes per game
FG%	Field goal percentage	3P%	3-point field goal percentage	FT%	Free throw percentage
RPG	Rebounds per game	APG	Assists per game	SPG	Steals per game
BPG	Blocks per game	PPG	Points per game	**Bold**	Career high

=== Regular season ===
Year	Team	GP	GS	MPG	FG%	3P%	FT%	RPG	APG	SPG	BPG	PPG
1990–91	Cleveland	**12**	0	**4.3**	.316	–	.583	0.8	0.3	**0.1**	**0.1**	1.6
1991–92	Miami	9	0	3.9	**.462**	–	**.750**	**1.2**	**0.7**	**0.1**	0.0	**2.0**
Career		21	0	4.1	.375	–	.650	1.0	0.5	0.1	0.0	1.8

== See also ==
- List of Serbian NBA players
