= Igor Tratnik =

Slovenian professional basketball player (born 1989)

Personal information
- Born: June 14, 1989 (age 37) Ljubljana, SFR Yugoslavia
- Listed height: 2.07 m (6 ft 9 in)
- Listed weight: 98 kg (216 lb)

Career information
- Playing career: 2006–present
- Position: Forward

Career history
- 2005–2007: Grosuplje
- 2007–2009: Helios Domžale
- 2009: Luka Koper
- 2009: Postojna
- 2010: KFÍ
- 2010: Ferretería San Isidro
- 2010–2011: CB Aridane
- 2011–2012: Valur
- 2012: Tindastóll
- 2012–2013: Grosuplje
- 2013–2014: Portorož
- 2014–2015: Zlatorog Laško
- 2015–2016: Krka Novo Mesto
- 2016: Tajfun Šentjur
- 2016–2017: Zlatorog Laško
- 2017–2019: Petrol Olimpija
- 2019: Helios Suns
- 2019: Parklji
- 2019–2020: Rieker Komárno
- 2020: Zlatorog Laško
- 2021–2024: KD Slovan

Career highlights
- Slovenian League champion (2018); Slovenian League MVP (2017); 1. deild karla champion (2010); Slovenian Cup winner (2016)

Igor Tratnik (born June 14, 1989) is a retired Slovenian professional basketball player. He is a 2.07 m (6 ft 9 in) tall forward. He played for Slovenia at the 2007 FIBA Europe Under-18 Championship.

== Career ==
=== Iceland ===
Tratnik joined KFÍ in January 2010 and helped them win the Icelandic second-tier 1. deild karla and achieve promotion to the top-tier Úrvalsdeild karla. In 8 games he averaged 21.3 points, 13.1 rebounds and 3.0 blocks.

In 2011, Tratnik joined Úrvalsdeild club Valur, averaging 15.5 points and 10.6 rebounds in 13 games.

=== Slovenia ===
In 2013, Tratnik agreed a contract with KK Portorož, where he became the MVP of the first week of the 2013–14 Slovenian Basketball League, after scoring 25 points in the 92–70 away loss against KK Hopsi Polzela.

In Summer 2014 he signed with Zlatorog Laško, where he became two times MVP of the week in the 2014–15 Slovenian Basketball League.

In July 2015, Tratnik moved to KK Krka. He terminated his contract on March 14, 2016.

On March 18, 2016, KK Šentjur announced that they had signed a contract with Tratnik.

On December 13, 2017, Tratnik signed with Petrol Olimpija for the rest of the 2017–18 season.

On September 29, 2021, Tratnik signed with KD Slovan of the Slovenian Second League.
