= Dalan Ancrum =

American basketball player

No. 6 – Egis Körmend
- Position: Small forward
- League: Nemzeti Bajnokság I/A

Personal information
- Born: May 26, 1996 (age 30) Round Rock, Texas, U.S.
- Listed height: 6 ft 7 in (2.01 m)
- Listed weight: 200 lb (91 kg)

Career information
- High school: Westwood (Austin, Texas)
- College: Western Illinois (2014–2018)
- NBA draft: 2018: undrafted
- Playing career: 2018–present

Career history
- 2018–2019: Al-Arabi
- 2019–2021: Enosis Neon Paralimni
- 2021: Chieti Basket 1974
- 2022: BKM Lučenec
- 2022–2024: Union Neuchâtel
- 2024–2025: Dinamo București
- 2026: Peja
- 2026–present: Egis Körmend

Dalan Ancrum (born May 26, 1996) is an American professional basketball player for Egis Körmend of the Nemzeti Bajnokság I/A. He played college basketball for the Western Illinois Leathernecks.

== High school career ==
Ancrum played basketball for Westwood High School in Austin, Texas. As a senior, he averaged 18.6 points, 6.6 rebounds, 2.3 assists and 2.1 steals per game. During his two seasons in high school, he Tabbed All-District First Team honors in both seasons.

== College career ==
During his college career, Ancrum played for Western Illinois. As a senior, he had his best season with the Leathernecks, averaging 13.5 points, 5.3 rebounds, 1.8 assists and 1 steal per game.

== Professional career ==
After going undrafted in the 2018 NBA draft, Ancrum signed his first professional contract with Al-Arabi of the Qatari Basketball League. In 3 games, Ancrum averaged 16.3 points and 5.3 rebounds per game. On August 12, 2020, he signed with Enosis Neon Paralimni of the Cypriot League. After a successful first season, he re-signed with Paralimni for another season. Ancrum joined Pallacanestro Chieti of the Serie A2 Basket in 2021. On January 11, 2022, Ancrum signed with BKM Lučenec of the Slovak Basketball League.

== Personal life ==
Ancrum's father is former professional basketball player David Ancrum.
