= Phillip Carr =

American basketball player (born 1995)

Free agent
- Position: Forward

Personal information
- Born: October 20, 1995 (age 31) Raleigh, North Carolina, U.S.
- Listed height: 6 ft 9 in (2.06 m)
- Listed weight: 205 lb (93 kg)

Career information
- High school: Transit Tech (Brooklyn, New York)
- College: Mohawk Valley CC (2013–2014); Morgan State (2015–2018)
- NBA draft: 2018: undrafted
- Playing career: 2018–present

Career history
- 2018–2019: Westchester Knicks
- 2019: Cleveland Charge
- 2019–2020: Iskra Svit
- 2020–2021: Norrköping Dolphins
- 2021–2022: UCC Assigeco Piacenza
- 2022–2023: Jämtland Basket
- 2023: AD Galomar
- 2024: Tauranga Whai
- 2024–2025: Rasta Vechta
- 2025–2026: Unifacisa Paraiba

Career highlights
- Swedish League champion (2021); 2× First-team All-MEAC (2017, 2018); MEAC Defensive Player of the Year (2017)
- Stats at Basketball Reference

Phillip Carr (born October 20, 1995) is an American professional basketball player who last played for Unifacisa Paraiba of the Novo Basquete Brasil (NBB). He played three years of college basketball for the Morgan State Bears before playing professionally in the NBA G League, Slovakia, Sweden, Italy and Portugal.

== Early life ==
Carr was born in Raleigh, North Carolina. He played power forward and center at Transit Tech High School in Brooklyn, New York, where he helped lead the team to an Elite 8 appearance. He also played volleyball at Transit Tech.

== College career ==
Carr played his first college basketball season for Mohawk Valley Community College during the 2013–14 season. He averaged 8.4 points and 7.7 rebounds to help the Hawks to a 24–6 record.

After spending the 2014–15 season with Williston State College but not playing, Carr transferred to Morgan State in May 2015.

Carr played three seasons for the Morgan State Bears between 2015 and 2018. He earned MEAC Defensive Player of the Year in 2017 and first-team All-MEAC in 2017 and 2018. In 87 games, he averaged 13.4 points, 8.5 rebounds and 1.2 assists per game.

== Professional career ==
After a preseason stint with the New York Knicks, Carr joined the Westchester Knicks of the NBA G League for the 2018–19 season. He was released by Westchester on January 10, 2019, and a week later he was acquired by the Canton Charge.

For the 2019–20 season, Carr joined Iskra Svit of the Slovak Basketball League. He went on to play for Norrköping Dolphins in Sweden in 2020–21, UCC Assigeco Piacenza in Italy in 2021–22, and Jämtland Basket in Sweden in 2022–23. He joined AD Galomar in Portugal for the 2023–24 season but left in December 2023.

On March 1, 2024, Carr signed with the Tauranga Whai of the New Zealand National Basketball League (NZNBL) for the 2024 season.
