= Joel Mäntynen =

Finnish basketball player (born 2002)

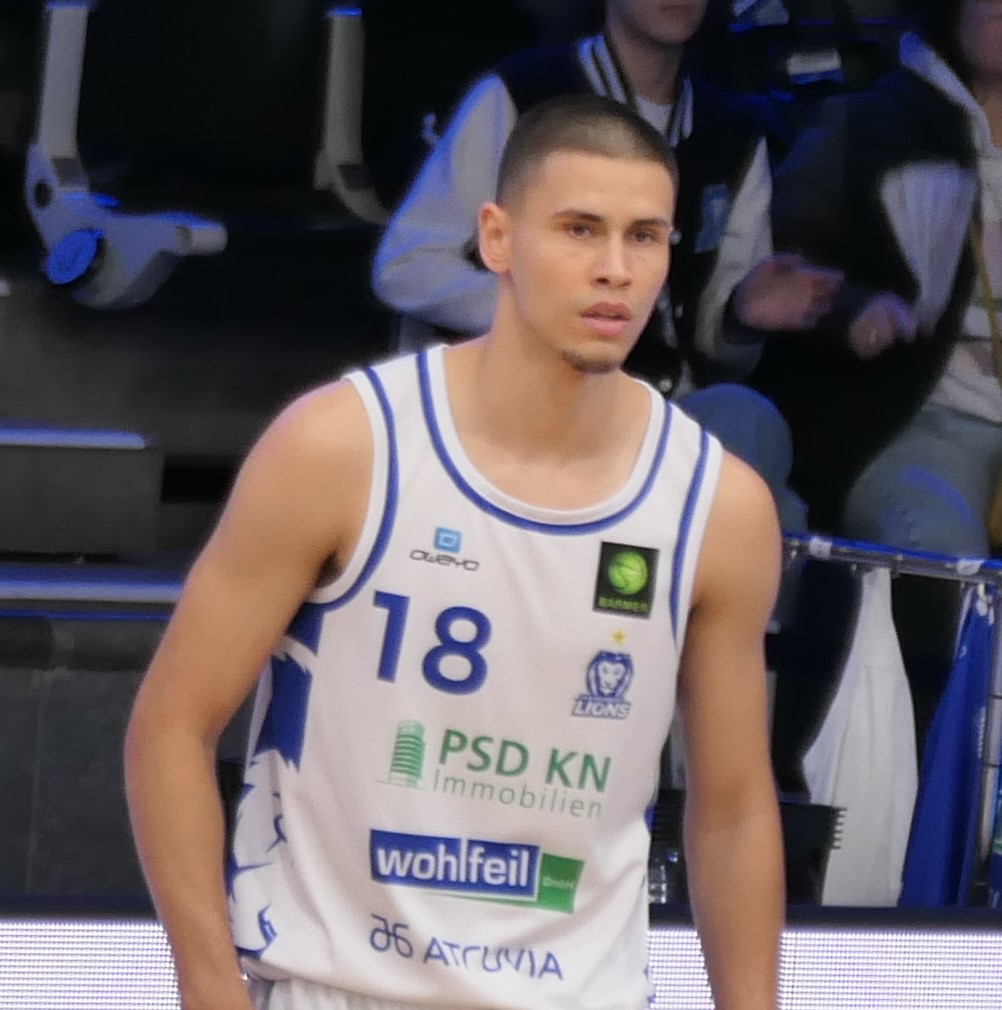
- Mäntynen with Karlsruhe in 2024

PS Karlsruhe Lions
- Position: Point guard
- League: ProA

Personal information
- Born: 1 January 2002 (age 24) Kotka, Finland
- Listed height: 1.99 m (6 ft 6 in)
- Listed weight: 85 kg (187 lb)

Career information
- Playing career: 2018–present

Career history
- 2018–2022: Korikouvot
- 2020–2024: Kouvot
- 2024: Patrioti Levice
- 2024–present: Karlsruhe Lions

Joel Mäntynen (born 13 January 2002) is a Finnish professional basketball player who plays as a point guard for Karlsruhe Lions in the German ProA.

== Early career ==
Mäntynen was born in Kotka, but moved to nearby town of Kouvola when aged 16. He joined Korikouvot, the reserve team of Kouvot in 2018, competing in second-tier Koripallon I-divisioona.

== Career ==
Mäntynen played with Kouvot in Korisliiga during 2020–2024.

In August 2024, Mäntynen signed with Slovak champions BK Patrioti Levice in Slovak Basketball League. Later he joined Karlsruhe Lions in German ProA.

In July 2025, Mäntynen was selected in NBA G-League international draft by the Rio Grande Valley Vipers as the 11th pick.

== National team career ==
Mäntynen has represented Finland at youth national teams, and has played 13 matches for Finland B national team.
