= Alpe Adria Cup =

Basketball competition in Europe

- Most recent season or competition: 2023–24 Alpe Adria Cup
- Sport: Basketball
- Founded: 2015
- First season: 2015–16
- Folded: 2024
- Countries: Austria; Croatia; Czech Republic; Poland; Romania; Slovakia; Slovenia
- Continent: FIBA Europe (Europe)
- Last champions: (Poland) MKS Dąbrowa Górnicza (2nd title)
- Most titles: (Poland) MKS Dąbrowa Górnicza (2 titles)

Alpe Adria Cup was an international basketball club competition. In the 2023–24 season, the league comprised teams from seven countries: Austria, Croatia, Czech Republic, Poland, Romania, Slovakia and Slovenia. It was played under the rules of FIBA.

== 2023–24 teams ==
| Team | Location | Established |
|---|---|---|
| (Czech Republic) BC Geosan Kolín | Kolín | 1940 |
| (Austria) BC Vienna | Vienna | 2010 |
| (Czech Republic) BK Redstone Olomoucko | Olomouc | 2017 |
| (Czech Republic) BK Sluneta Ústí nad Labem | Ústí nad Labem | 1946 |
| (Croatia) KK Dinamo Zagreb | Zagreb | 1972 |
| (Croatia) KK Dubrava | Zagreb | 1976 |
| (Slovenia) KK Ilirija | Ljubljana | 1957 |
| (Poland) MKS Dąbrowa Górnicza | Dąbrowa Górnicza | 1992 |
| (Austria) OSC Capital Bulls | Kapfenberg | 1976 |
| (Romania) SCM winsed.swiss Mozzart Bet Timișoara | Timișoara | 1956 |
| (Slovakia) Spišskí Rytieri | Spišská Nová Ves | 2004 |

== Finals ==
| Year | Final | | | Semifinalists | | |
| Year | Champions | Score | Second place | Third place | Score | Fourth place |
|---|---|---|---|---|---|---|
| 2015–16; Details | Helios Suns (Slovenia) | 66–63 | (Slovenia) Zlatorog Laško | Zagreb (Croatia) | 94–73 | (Slovakia) Prievidza |
| 2016–17; Details | Rieker Komárno (Slovakia) | 160–139; 97–72 / 63–67 | (Slovenia) Helios Suns | (Slovenia) Rogaška and (Slovenia) Zlatorog Laško | | |
| 2017–18; Details | Zlatorog Laško (Slovenia) | 89–79 | (Slovakia) Levickí Patrioti | (Czech Republic) Brno and (Czech Republic) USK Praha | | |
| 2018–19; Details | Egis Körmend (Hungary) | 159–147; 67–76 / 92–71 | (Croatia) Adria Oil Škrljevo | (Poland) GTK Gliwice and (Slovakia) Patrioti Levice | | |
| 2019–20; Details | JIP Pardubice (Czech Republic) | 185–176; 89–96 / 96–80 | (Czech Republic) Armex Děčín | (Austria) Hallmann Vienna and (Austria) Swans Gmunden | | |
| 2020–21; Details | The season was cancelled due to the COVID-19 pandemic in Europe. | | | | | |
| 2021–22; Details | Patrioti Levice (Slovakia) | 82–63 | (Czech Republic) JIP Pardubice | (Austria) GGMT Vienna and (Slovakia) Spišski Rytieri | | |
| 2022–23; Details | MKS Dąbrowa Górnicza (Poland) | 86–72 | (Austria) GGMT Vienna | (Slovakia) BC Komárno and (Slovakia) Spišski Rytieri | | |
| 2023–24; Details | MKS Dąbrowa Górnicza (Poland) | 90–88 | (Romania) WS Mozzart Bet Timișoara | (Austria) OSC Capital Bulls and (Czech Republic) Redstone Olomoucko | | |
