= Aleksandar Zečević (basketball, born 1996) =

Serbian basketball player

Free Agent
- Position: Center

Personal information
- Born: October 3, 1996 (age 30) Novi Sad, FR Yugoslavia
- Listed height: 6 ft 10 in (2.08 m)
- Listed weight: 245 lb (111 kg)

Career information
- High school: Scotland Performance Institute (Chambersburg, Pennsylvania)
- College: Florida Atlantic (2018–2020)
- NBA draft: 2020: undrafted
- Playing career: 2020–present

Career history
- 2020–2021: MBK Baník Handlová
- 2021–2022: Kharkivski Sokoly
- 2022–2023: Zastal Zielona Góra
- 2022–2023: EWE Baskets Oldenburg
- 2023: Nizhny Novgorod
- 2023–2024: Tsmoki-Minsk
- 2024: Bnei Herzliya
- 2024–2025: EWE Baskets Oldenburg
- 2025–2026: Darüşşafaka

Aleksandar Zečević (Serbian Cyrillic: Александар Зечевић; born October 3, 1996), is a Serbian professional basketball player who last played for Darüşşafaka of the Türkiye Basketbol Ligi (TBL). Standing at 2.08 metres (6 ft 10 in), he plays at the power forward and center positions.

== College career ==
Native of Futog, a suburban town of the city of Novi Sad, Zečević began playing in local clubs at the age of six. At the last year of the high school, he played for basketball club Tamiš in Pančevo.

In 2016-17 he played with Mostlow State College and averaged 9.2 points and 6.1 rebounds.

He attended Scotland Performance Institute in Chambersburg, Pennsylvania and committed to play with the Florida Atlantic University Owls, where in the next two seasons he averaged 5.5 points and 4.1 rebounds per game. also winning Mostlow State College Region 7 Tennessee Championship. In 2019-20 he was 10th in the C-USA with a .593 2 point field goal percentage.

=== College statistics ===
Year	Team	GP	GS	MPG	%TC	%3P	%FT	RPG	APG	SPG	BPG	PPG
2018–19	Florida Atlantic	32	11	12.3	.552	.273	.632	3.7	0.3	0.3	0.4	4.8
2019–20	Florida Atlantic	32	11	16.8	.531	.222	.625	4.5	0.9	0.5	0.3	6.2
Total		64	22	14.5	.540	.237	.627	4.1	0.6	0.4	0.3	5.5

== Professional career ==
After going undrafted in the 2020 NBA draft, on August 9, 2020, Zečević joined the roster of the MBK Baník Handlová of the Slovak Basketball League (SBL), the first tier of basketball in Slovakia. He averaged 14.5 points per game, shooting 59.5% from the floor (5th in the league), with 8.7 rebounds per game (4th), and 0.5 blocks per game (10th).

On July 29, 2021, he signed with Kharkivski Sokoly of the Ukrainian Basketball Superleague. He averaged 14.5 points per game (10th in the league), with 8.3 rebounds per game (2nd).

On August 5, 2022, he has signed with Zastal Zielona Góra of the Polish Basketball League (PLK).

On February 28, 2024, he signed with Bnei Herzliya Basket in the Israeli Basketball Premier League.

On September 14, 2024, he signed with EWE Baskets Oldenburg of the German Basketball Bundesliga (BBL).

On August 30, 2025, he signed with Darüşşafaka of the Türkiye Basketbol Ligi (TBL).
