= Aatu Kivimäki =

Finnish basketball player (born 1997)

No. 12 – Patrioti Levice
- Position: Point guard
- League: SBL

Personal information
- Born: June 8, 1997 (age 29) Karkkila, Finland
- Listed height: 1.86 m (6 ft 1 in)
- Listed weight: 81 kg (179 lb)

Career information
- Playing career: 2012–present

Career history
- 2012–2016: Karkkilan Urheilijat
- 2016–2021: Salon Vilpas
- 2021–2024: Tigers Tübingen
- 2024–present: Patrioti Levice

Career highlights
- Slovak League champion (2025); Finnish Korisliiga champion (2021); Finnish Cup winner (2019); Korisliiga Rookie of the Year (2017)

Aatu Kivimäki (born 8 June 1997) is a Finnish basketball player who plays as a point guard for Patrioti Levice of Slovak Extraliga (basketball) (SLB).

== Professional career ==
Kivimäki started basketball with Karkkilan Urheilijat.

=== Salon Vilpas (2016–2021) ===
During 2016–2021, he played for Salon Vilpas in Korisliiga, winning the Finnish championship in 2021. He was also awarded the Korisliiga Rookie of the Year in 2017. Vilpas also won two silver medals in the league in 2017 and 2018.

=== Tigers Tübingen (2021–2024) ===
In 2021, he joined Tigers Tübingen in German ProA. In 2023, they won the promotion to Basketball Bundesliga. Next season Kivimäki averaged 6.4 points and 4.1 assists in Bundesliga.

=== Patrioti Levice (2024–present) ===
In September 2024, Kivimäki joined Patrioti Levice in Slovak Basketball League. They won the domestic championship in 2025. They also played in the FIBA Europe Cup.

Kivimäki and Levice qualified for the 2025–26 Basketball Champions League, by defeating Bakken Bears in the decisive qualifying game 100–98 with a buzzer beater winner after two extra times.

== National team career ==
A former youth international, Kivimäki has played for Finland senior national team.
