= 2015–16 Alpe Adria Cup =

- Season: 2015–16
- Duration: September 29, 2015 – March 2, 2016
- Games played: 36
- Teams: 8

Finals
- Champions: (Slovenia) Helios Suns Domžale (1st title)
- Runners-up: (Slovenia) Zlatorog Laško
- Third place: (Croatia) Zagreb
- Fourth place: (Slovakia) Prievidza

The 2015–16 Alpe Adria Cup, also known as Sixt Alpe Adria Cup by sponsorship reasons, was the first edition of this tournament. It started on 29 September 2015 and finished in March 2016.

Eight teams joined the competition and were divided into two groups of four teams each one. The eight teams advanced to a playoff where the four winners qualified to the Final Four.

== Regular season ==
=== Group A ===
| Pos | Team | Pld | W | L | PF | PA | PD | Pts | Qualification | DOM | LEV | KVA | TRA |
|---|---|---|---|---|---|---|---|---|---|---|---|---|---|
| 1 | (Slovenia) Helios Suns Domžale | 6 | 4 | 2 | 531 | 463 | +68 | 10 | Quarterfinals | — | 90–52 | 75–68 | 81–71 |
| 2 | (Slovakia) Levicki Patrioti | 6 | 4 | 2 | 458 | 418 | +40 | 10 | Quarterfinals | 74–67 | — | 86–64 | 92–50 |
| 3 | (Croatia) Kvarner 2010 | 6 | 4 | 2 | 538 | 552 | −14 | 10 | Quarterfinals | 86–73 | 79–78 | — | 84–66 |
| 4 | (Austria) Traiskirchen Lions | 6 | 0 | 6 | 394 | 482 | −88 | 6 | Quarterfinals | 51–58 | 68–76 | 88–91 | — |

Source: Alpe Adria Cup

=== Group B ===
| Pos | Team | Pld | W | L | PF | PA | PD | Pts | Qualification | PRI | ZAG | ZLA | KLO |
|---|---|---|---|---|---|---|---|---|---|---|---|---|---|
| 1 | (Slovakia) Prievidza | 6 | 5 | 1 | 533 | 423 | +110 | 11 | Quarterfinals | — | 90–62 | 79–72 | 104–62 |
| 2 | (Croatia) Zagreb | 6 | 3 | 3 | 566 | 532 | +34 | 9 | Quarterfinals | 87–78 | — | 72–73 | 96–67 |
| 3 | (Slovenia) Zlatorog Laško | 6 | 3 | 3 | 492 | 473 | +19 | 9 | Quarterfinals | 78–80 | 74–84 | — | 99–84 |
| 4 | (Austria) Klosterneuburg Dukes | 6 | 1 | 5 | 494 | 663 | −169 | 7 | Quarterfinals | 62–102 | 84–79 | 74–96 | — |

Source: Alpe Adria Cup

== Quarterfinals ==
First games of the quarterfinals will be played from 3 February 2016, at the arena of the Team #2.

| Team 1 | Agg. | Team 2 | 1st leg | 2nd leg |
|---|---|---|---|---|
| Helios Suns Domžale (Slovenia) | 168–121 | (Austria) Klosterneuburg Dukes | 87–61 | 81–60 |
| Levicki Patrioti (Slovakia) | 134–165 | (Slovenia) Zlatorog Laško | 73–67 | 61–98 |
| Prievidza (Slovakia) | 172–136 | (Austria) Traiskirchen Lions | 85–71 | 87–65 |
| Zagreb (Croatia) | 187–154 | (Croatia) Kvarner 2010 | 86–66 | 101–88 |

== Final four ==
The four winners of the quarterfinals joined the Final Four that was played on 1 and 2 March 2016 in Domžale, Slovenia. Helios Suns Domžale, host team, achieved the title of the first edition of the Alpe Adria Cup.

Semifinals; 1 March
(Slovakia) Prievidza | 80
(Slovenia) Zlatorog Laško | 89
(Slovenia) Helios Suns Domžale | 84
(Croatia) Zagreb | 65

Final; 2 March
(Slovenia) Zlatorog Laško | 63
(Slovenia) Helios Suns Domžale | 66
Third place 2 March
(Slovakia) Prievidza | 73
(Croatia) Zagreb | 94
