= Sacramento Country Day School =

Prep school in Arden-Arcade, California, US

Information
- Type: Independent, Private
- Established: 1964
- Head of school: Lee Thomsen
- Faculty: 75
- Grades: Pre-K-12
- Gender: co-educational
- Enrollment: 587
- Campus size: 11 acres
- Campus type: Suburban
- Colors: Red and Black
- Athletics conference: Sacramento Metropolitan Athletic League (SMAL)
- Nickname: Cavaliers
- Accreditation: Western Association of Schools and Colleges; California Association of Independent Schools
- Newspaper: The Octagon
- Yearbook: The Medallion
- Website: www.saccds.org

Sacramento Country Day School (SCDS) is an independent, co-educational, college preparatory school serving Pre-Kindergarten through Grade 12 since 1964. Sacramento Country Day is located in the unincorporated Arden Arcade neighborhood of Sacramento, California, and serves students from all surrounding areas, including Carmichael, Davis, Elk Grove, Placerville, Folsom, and El Dorado Hills.

== History ==
Seeking an academically-challenging school for their son, Greg, Dr. Baxter Geeting and his wife, Corinne, formulated the concept for Country Day around their kitchen table. About that time, Dr. Geeting met Herbert Matthews, who was teaching math at a small school in Carmichael, and convinced him to join the discussion. Soon, the school envisioned by these educators became a reality.

September 14, 1964, the school opened with 12 students in portable buildings at the Unitarian Church on Sierra Blvd. The following year, the school relocated to its present campus on Latham Drive with 123 students in grades kindergarten through nine. High School buildings arrived in 1970, the multi-purpose building in 1977, and Lower School classrooms in 1979. The building boom of the 1980s produced the gymnasium (1982), the Matthews Library (1985), the administration building (1985), and the Lower School library “wing” (1985). Recent construction includes the Frank Science Center (2005), and the new Lower School building and renovation, completed in August 2008.

As the physical plant and enrollment steadily grew, so did the strength and breadth of the school's educational programs. Over the decades, SCDS added many Advanced Placement, honors, and elective courses in addition to co-curricular programs such as Mock Trial and Solar Regatta; field trips such as Sutter's Fort, Marin Headlands, and Catalina Island; and over two dozen interscholastic athletic teams.

== Lower School ==
The Lower School begins with Pre- Kindergarten and continues through the Fifth Grade.

A daily schedule of core subjects in language arts, mathematics, science, and social studies is complemented by enrichment classes in world languages, art, Music & Movement, P.E., and library studies.

== Middle School ==
The no-cut athletic program includes volleyball, basketball, cross-country, soccer, track and field, golf and flag football, and competes in the Parochial Athletic League.

== High School ==
The high school consists of roughly 180 students in 9th through 12th Grade.

25 Advanced Placement (AP) courses and 6 specialized Advanced Topic (AT) courses are available for students who wish to pursue college-level study in high school. The five-year AP score report shows that roughly 85% of students earn a three or higher on their AP tests. There are many student clubs and varsity sports teams available to students. Community service is required to graduate. Students must take at least three consecutive years of French, Spanish, or Latin in order to graduate. Arts and drama activities are also available.

Annual class trips include Sierra Nevada for ninth grade, Northern CA dude Ranch for 10th grade, Ashland Shakespeare Festival for 11th grade, and Rafting trip for 12th grade.

Year after year, SAT scores average nearly 100 points higher than any other area schools. University of CA acceptance rates were 90% in 2022, considered highest in the region. According to SCDS publications, graduates are regularly accepted to a higher education institution, including universities such as Harvard University, Columbia University, University of California, Los Angeles, Stanford University, Cornell University, Princeton University, and other top-tier schools.

== Octagon ==
The Octagon is an established school newspaper with a staff of 22 students. The publication has previously won the Pacemaker award, an award equal in prestige to a Pulitzer Prize for high school journalism, and is a finalist for its 08-09 publications. It is a part of the High School National Ad Network and can be viewed online.

== Notable faculty ==
- David Ancrum (born 1958), basketball player, top scorer in the 1994 Israel Basketball Premier League
