= Darius Dimavičius =

Lithuanian basketball player (born 1968)

Personal information
- Born: April 8, 1968 (age 58) Kaunas, Lithuanian SSR, Soviet Union
- Listed height: 6 ft 9 in (2.06 m)
- Listed weight: 211 lb (96 kg)

Career information
- Playing career: 1989–2007
- Position: Power forward

Career history
- 1989–1991: Žalgiris Kaunas
- 1991–1993: BC Banik Cigel Prievidza
- 1993–1995: BC Sparta Bertrange
- 1995–1997: BC Banik Cigel Prievidza
- 1997–1998: USK Erpet Praha
- 1998–1999: Lietuvos rytas Vilnius
- 1999–2000: Sema Panevėžys
- 2000–2002: Swans Gmunden
- 2002–2003: Barreirense Basket
- 2003–2004: Gymnastikos S. Larissas
- 2004–2005: Brno
- 2005–2006: SPU Nitra
- 2006–2007: Atletas Kaunas

Career highlights
- LKF cup (1998)
Medals
Men's basketball
Representing Lithuania
Olympic Games
Bronze medal – third place	1992 Barcelona

Darius Dimavičius (born April 8, 1968) is a retired Lithuanian professional basketball player, who won the bronze medal with the Lithuania national basketball team at the 1992 Summer Olympics in Barcelona, Spain.
