= Transit Tech High School =

Public school in New York City

Coordinates: 40°40′42.84″N 73°52′32.82″W

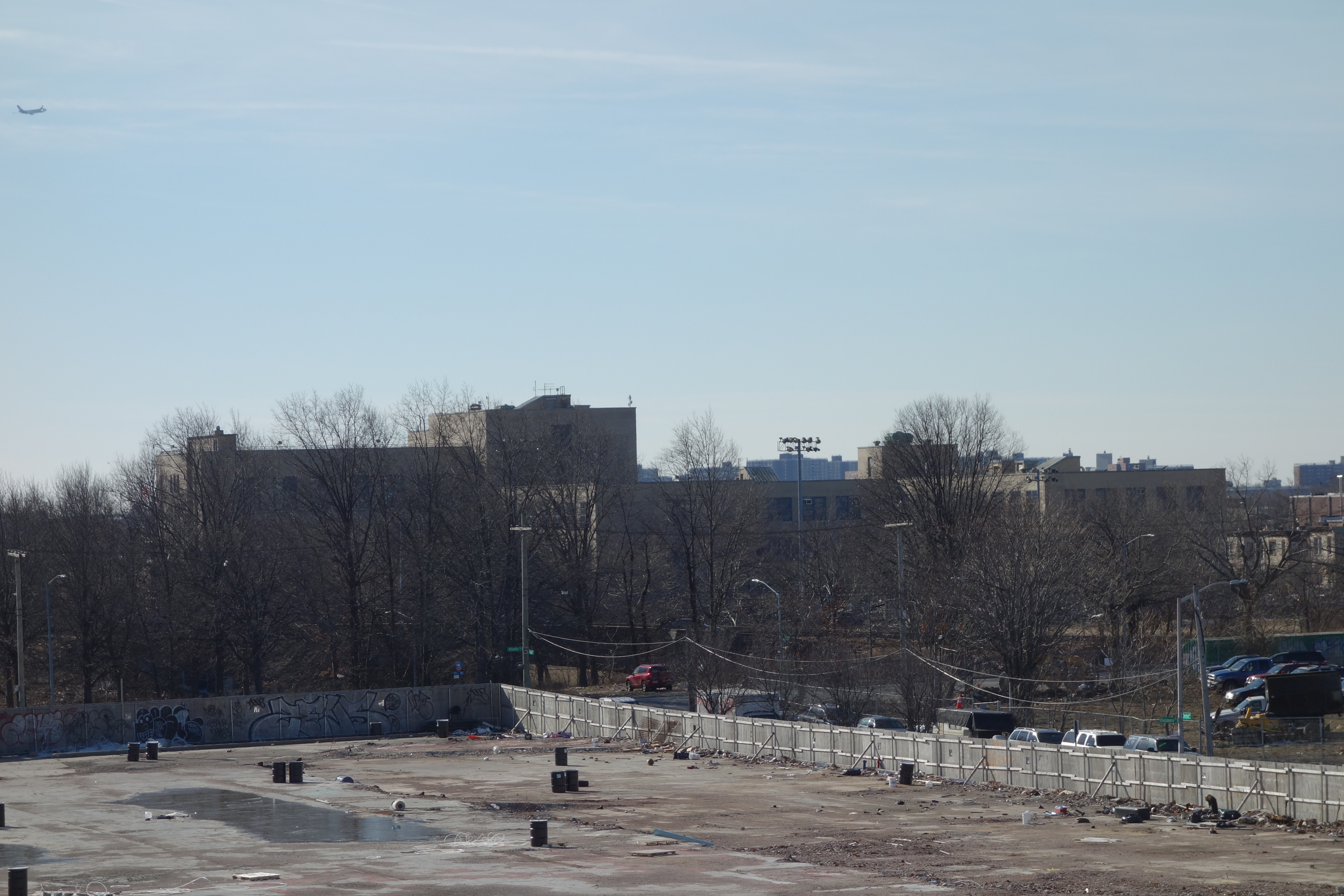

Location
- 1 Wells St., Brooklyn, NY 11208; United States of America

Information
- Type: High School
- Principal: Marlon Bynum
- Grades: 09, 10, 11, 12, SE
- Enrollment: 1542
- Website: https://transittechhs.org
- https://transittechhs.org/school-info/

Transit Tech High School is a vocational high school in the East New York neighborhood of Brooklyn, New York. It is a trade school whose mission is the training of students for careers in the rapid transit industry. It is located at 1 Wells Street, at the corner of Fountain Avenue, between Atlantic Avenue and Liberty Avenue. The athletic field for the school is at the south side of the beginning of Conduit Boulevard.

== History ==
The school lies on the site of the East New York Vocational High School. The school was built on the former site of pumping stations for the Ridgewood Reservoir. It was constructed coincidental with the construction of Conduit Boulevard.

The school was originally named East New York Continuation High School in 1915, but was renamed to East New York Workers High School of Brooklyn in 1922. In 1941, it was renamed to East New York Vocational High School. Finally, in 1986 it was renamed to Transit Tech High School. In October 2022, the first football team for the school was created, over its 100+ years.

In the late 1980s, it converted to its present mission. Its first graduating class was in 1990.

== Notable alumni ==
- Phillip Carr (2013), basketball player who plays professionally in New Zealand
