= 2016–17 Alpe Adria Cup =

- Season: 2016–17
- Duration: September 29, 2016 –
- Teams: 13

Finals
- Champions: Rieker Komárno
- Runners-up: Helios Suns

The 2016–17 Alpe Adria Cup, also known as Sixt Alpe Adria Cup due to sponsorship reasons, was the second edition of Alpe Adria Cup. It started on 29 September 2016.

Thirteen teams from four countries joined the competition and were divided into three groups of three teams and one group with four teams. Top two team from each group qualified for the quarterfinals.

== Regular season ==
=== Group A ===
Pos	Team	Pld	W	L	PF	PA	PD	Pts	Qualification	ZLA	PRI	OSI	KLO
1	(Slovenia) Zlatorog Laško	6	5	1	469	351	+118	11	Quarterfinals	—	85–51	92–62	94–59
2	(Slovenia) Sixt Primorska	6	4	2	404	381	+23	10	Quarterfinals	53–59	—	82–58	64–55
3	(Croatia) Vrijednosnice Osijek	6	2	4	420	441	−21	8		73–57	74–78	—	89–57
4	(Austria) Klosterneuburg Dukes	6	1	5	349	469	−120	7		53–82	50–76	75–64	—

Source: Alpe Adria Cup

=== Group B ===
Pos	Team	Pld	W	L	PF	PA	PD	Pts	Qualification	DOM	TRA	ZAB
1	(Slovenia) Helios Suns	4	3	1	296	257	+39	7	Quarterfinals	—	52–54	75–57
2	(Austria) Traiskirchen Lions	3	2	1	183	185	−2	5	Quarterfinals	56–72	—	73–61
3	(Croatia) Zabok	3	0	3	208	245	−37	3		90–97		—

Source: Alpe Adria Cup

=== Group C ===
Pos	Team	Pld	W	L	PF	PA	PD	Pts	Qualification	LEV	KAP	SEN
1	(Slovakia) Levicki Patrioti	4	3	1	315	287	+28	7	Quarterfinals	—	90–59	79–77
2	(Austria) ece Bulls Kapfenberg	4	3	1	308	312	−4	7	Quarterfinals	91–78	—	83–73
3	(Slovenia) Šentjur	4	0	4	281	305	−24	4		60–68	71–75	—

Source: Alpe Adria Cup

=== Group D ===
Pos	Team	Pld	W	L	PF	PA	PD	Pts	Qualification	ROG	RIE	DEC
1	(Slovenia) Rogaška	4	3	1	299	257	+42	7	Quarterfinals	—	85–56	79–67
2	(Slovakia) Rieker Komárno	4	2	2	279	300	−21	6	Quarterfinals	81–68	—	65–72
3	(Czech Republic) Armex Děčín	4	1	3	267	288	−21	5		53–67	75–77	—

Source: Alpe Adria Cup

== Quarterfinals ==
Team 1	Agg.	Team 2	1st leg	2nd leg
Traiskirchen Lions (Austria)	126–129	(Slovenia) Zlatorog Laško	73–67	53–62
Sixt Primorska (Slovenia)	106–131	(Slovenia) Helios Suns	56–71	50–61
Levicki Patrioti (Slovakia)	161–183	(Slovakia) Rieker Komárno	86–80	75–103
ece Bulls Kapfenberg (Austria)	144–153	(Slovenia) Rogaška	75–66	69–87

== Semifinals ==
Team 1	Agg.	Team 2	1st leg	2nd leg
Rieker Komárno (Slovakia)	147–140	(Slovenia) Zlatorog Laško	80–68	67–72
Rogaška (Slovenia)	130–143	(Slovenia) Helios Suns	68–76	62–67

== Finals ==
Team 1	Agg.	Team 2	1st leg	2nd leg
Rieker Komárno (Slovakia)	160–139	(Slovenia) Helios Suns	97–72	63–67
