= David Ancrum =

American and college basketball player (born 1958)

Personal information
- Born: June 9, 1958 (age 68) New York City, New York, US
- Listed height: 6 ft 4 in (1.93 m)
- Listed weight: 206 lb (93 kg)

Career information
- College: Morrisville State (1976–1978); Utica (1978–1980)
- NBA draft: 1980: undrafted
- Playing career: 1980–1996
- Position: Shooting guard

Career history
- 1984–1986: Albany Patroons
- 1986–1987: Savannah Spirits
- 1987–1992: Iraklis Thessaloniki
- 1992–1993: Maccabi Tel Aviv
- 1993–1996: Hapoel Afula

Career highlights
- As player: Greek League All-Star (1991); No. 6 retired by Iraklis Thessaloniki (1996); Israeli Premier League Top Scorer (1994); Ecuadorian League champion (1981); Ecuadorian League MVP (1981)

David Chalton Ancrum (known in Greece as David Ingram, due to a transliteration error; born June 9, 1958) is an American former college and professional basketball player and coach. Ancrum played college basketball for Utica College. Subsequently, he had a professional basketball career, and he played in several leagues, most notably in the Continental Basketball Association (CBA), the Greek Basketball League, and the Israeli Premier League. In 1994, he was the Israeli Premier League's Top Scorer.

== College career ==
Born in New York City, Ancrum grew up in Roosevelt, New York, on Long Island. He played college basketball at the JUCO level, at Morrisville State, from 1976 to 1978. After that, he attended Utica College, where he played college basketball at the NCAA Division III level, with the school's men's basketball team, the Utica Pioneers, from 1978 to 1980. He is the all-time leader in points per game for Utica College, with an average of 23.1 points per game, in 47 games played. He is also the school's seventh all-time leading scorer, with 1,084 total points scored. He is the only Utica player to reach the 1,000 points scored mark in less than four seasons, and the only Utica player to score more than 600 points in a single season. In 2010, Ancrum was inducted into the Utica Athletics Hall of Fame.

== Professional career ==
Ancrum began his professional club career in Ecuador. With Athletic Club, he won the Ecuadorian League championship in 1981. He was also declared the best player of the Ecuadorian League in 1981. Among Ancrum's well-known teammates on his Ecuadorian teams, players such as Nicolás Lapentti and Vargas stood out. After playing in Ecuador, Ancrum went to Panama, where he played in the Panamanian League.

Ancrum then played professionally in the US, for the Albany Patroons of the Continental Basketball Association (CBA), from 1984 to 1986. While he was with the Patroons, he played under the team's head coach at the time, Phil Jackson. He averaged 14.2 points per game in the 1984–1985 season. He subsequently signed for the Savannah Spirits. He went on to lead the Spirits to a win over his previous team, the Patroons, by a score of 117–110, in a game in which he scored 23 points.

Ancrum then signed with Iraklis Thessaloniki of the Greek League, in 1987. In his first season with Iraklis, he was only eligible to play in European-wide international competitions, since foreign players were not allowed in the Greek League at the time. So in his first season with Iraklis, he only played with the club in the European-wide third-tier level FIBA Korać Cup's 1987–88 season competition. He averaged 22.9 points, 3.4 rebounds, 1.9 assists and 1.1 steals per game in that season's Korać Cup.

Starting with the 1988–1989 season, when foreign players were declared eligible in the Greek League, through the 1991–1992 season, he appeared in 104 Greek League games for Iraklis, in which he averaged 33.7 points, 4.5 rebounds, 1.1 assists and 1.1 steals per game.

After being waived by Iraklis, Ancrum played in the Israeli Premier League with Maccabi Tel Aviv and Hapoel Afula. In the EuroLeague's 1992–1993 season, Ancrum appeared in 11 games with Maccabi Tel Aviv, and he averaged 16.7 points, 3.4 rebounds, 1.5 assists and 1.0 steals per game. While he was with Hapoel Afula, he was the top scorer of the Israel Premier League, in 1994.

== Coaching career ==
Ancrum retired from playing professional basketball, due to the result of a knee injury. He then became a basketball coach at the high school level. He currently lives in Sacramento, California, where he runs the basketball program for the Sacramento Country Day School.

== Personal life ==
Ancrum's son Dalan, is also a professional basketball player.
