= 2017–18 Alpe Adria Cup =

- Season: 2017–18
- Duration: 15 September 2017 – 3 April 2018
- Teams: 16

Finals
- Champions: (Slovenia) Zlatorog Laško; 1st title
- Runners-up: (Slovakia) Levickí Patrioti

The 2017–18 Alpe Adria Cup, also known as Helios Alpe Adria Cup by sponsorship reasons, was the third edition of Alpe Adria Cup. It started on 15 September 2017 and ended 3 April 2018.

== Format ==
Sixteen teams from six countries joined the competition and were divided into four groups of four teams, where the top two teams from each group will qualify for the quarterfinals.

Before the draw, Croatian club Zabok withdrew from the competition. It was replaced by Czech mmcité Brno.

== Regular season ==
=== Group A ===
Pos	Team	Pld	W	L	PF	PA	PD	Pts	Qualification	ZLA	USK	VIE	PRI
1	(Slovenia) Zlatorog Laško	6	4	2	504	451	+53	10	Advance to quarterfinals	—	83–62	107–80	98–80
2	(Czech Republic) USK Praha	6	3	3	486	433	+53	9	Advance to quarterfinals	74–62	—	99–78	107–49
3	(Austria) Hallmann Vienna	6	3	3	427	433	−6	9		90–83	83–71	—	96–73
4	(Slovakia) Prievidza	6	2	4	345	445	−100	8		65–71	78–73	20–0	—

Source: Alpe Adria Cup

=== Group B ===
Pos	Team	Pld	W	L	PF	PA	PD	Pts	Qualification	DEC	KOR	SEN	KOM
1	(Czech Republic) Armex Děčín	6	4	2	487	460	+27	10	Advance to quarterfinals	—	80–72	98–80	84–70
2	(Hungary) Egis Körmend	6	4	2	475	464	+11	10	Advance to quarterfinals	77–71	—	95–86	79–68
3	(Slovenia) Šentjur	6	2	4	495	509	−14	8		81–87	93–77	—	81–67
4	(Slovakia) Rieker Com-therm Komárno	6	2	4	436	460	−24	8		80–67	66–75	85–74	—

Source: Alpe Adria Cup

=== Group C ===
Pos	Team	Pld	W	L	PF	PA	PD	Pts	Qualification	BRN	SEN	DUK	OSI
1	(Czech Republic) mmcité Brno	6	4	2	480	420	+60	10	Advance to quarterfinals	—	95–79	78–49	73–53
2	(Slovenia) Šenčur	6	4	2	454	426	+28	10	Advance to quarterfinals	78–73	—	75–58	80–59
3	(Austria) Klosterneuburg Dukes	6	2	4	413	456	−43	8		71–77	66–63	—	87–78
4	(Croatia) Vrijednosnice Osijek	6	2	4	440	485	−45	8		90–84	75–79	85–82	—

Source: Alpe Adria Cup

=== Group D ===
Pos	Team	Pld	W	L	PF	PA	PD	Pts	Qualification	LEV	HEL	SLU	GRA
1	(Slovakia) Levickí Patrioti	6	6	0	508	428	+80	12	Advance to quarterfinals	—	95–72	92–78	79–75
2	(Slovenia) Helios Suns	6	3	3	508	505	+3	9	Advance to quarterfinals	74–81	—	85–78	93–80
3	(Czech Republic) Sluneta Ústí nad Labem	6	2	4	503	451	+52	8		69–72	112–83	—	93–44
4	(Austria) Raiffeissen Graz	6	1	5	393	528	−135	7		60–89	59–101	75–73	—

Source: Alpe Adria Cup

== Playoffs ==
Quarter-finals; 17 February – 5 March
(Hungary) Egis Körmend	85	81	166
(Slovenia) Zlatorog Laško	82	89	171
(Slovenia) Helios Suns	64	40	104
(Czech Republic) mmcité Brno	67	78	145
(Czech Republic) USK Praha	78	81	159
(Czech Republic) Armex Děčín	68	83	151
(Slovenia) Šenčur	63	63	126
(Slovakia) Levickí Patrioti	77	101	178

Semi-finals; 12-19 March
(Slovenia) Zlatorog Laško	73	75	148
(Czech Republic) mmcité Brno	69	77	146
(Czech Republic) USK Praha	76	74	150
(Slovakia) Levickí Patrioti	73	79	152

Final; 3 April, Vienna
(Slovenia) Zlatorog Laško	89
(Slovakia) Levickí Patrioti	79
