= KK Zlatorog Laško =

Slovenian professional basketball club

- Leagues: Slovenian First League
- Founded: 1969; 57 years ago (as KK Laško)
- Arena: Tri Lilije Hall
- Capacity: 2,500
- Location: Laško, Slovenia
- Team colors: White, blue
- Main sponsor: Laško Brewery
- President: Matej Firm
- Head coach: Hrvoje Radanović
- Championships: 1 Slovenian Cup; 1 Alpe Adria Cup
- Website: Official website
Home	Away

Košarkarski klub Zlatorog Laško (English: Zlatorog Laško Basketball Club), commonly referred to as KK Zlatorog or simply Zlatorog, is a Slovenian basketball club based in Laško that competes in the Slovenian First League, the top flight of Slovenian basketball. The team play their home games at the Tri Lilije Hall.

== History ==
The club was established in 1969. During the initial years the club was competing under the name KK Laško. In 1972 they renamed as KK Zlatorog Laško, and in 1994 as KK Pivovarna Laško. A year before that, the town of Laško started the construction of a new modern sports hall which prompted rapid expansion of basketball in the town. The management also renewed the playing potential of the club, and in the 1995–96 season, after two years of competing in the second division, the club qualified for the Slovenian top division. Aleš Pipan replaced the former coach Andrej Žagar, and on the other hand, the players headed by Matjaž Tovornik were joined by new reinforcements, among them Mileta Lisica.

In the first season in the top division, the club finished in third place, and also qualified for the European Cup for the next season. At the beginning of the season the club acquired Ervin Dragšič and Miljan Goljović. In the 1997–98 season, the club once again finished third in the national league, and also reached the Slovenian Basketball Cup final, which they lost against Union Olimpija. In the European Cup, Zlatorog competed in the group with Fenerbahçe Ülker, Le Mans, Rīgas ASK, Idea Śląsk Wrocław and ICEC, and finished the qualification games in the 1/16 finals, when the team was defeated by Tofaş.

The 1998–99 season was one of the most successful in the club's history. On the domestic scene, the club completely matched the potential of the leading domestic club who was already well-established in the European competitions, and qualified for both the playoffs and the cup finals. After the victory over AEK Athens, the club defeated the Polish champions Śląsk Wrocław and the French club Cholet Basket. This took them to the quarter-finals of the Saporta Cup, where they lost to Aris.

The 1999–2000 season was difficult for the club, but it also meant the final establishment of the club on the European scene. In the EuroLeague, the club competed in the group with the Italian champions Benetton Treviso, Maccabi Tel Aviv, ASVEL Lyon-Villeurbanne, Olympiacos Piraeus and Ülker. They defeated Olympiacos and Ülker. In the second round, they played against Cibona Zagreb, Fortitudo Bologna and Efes Pilsen. In the domestic league, the club ended the regular season in first place. However, in the last game before the playoffs, the injuries of three key players, Mileta Lisica, Gregor Hafnar and Boštjan Nachbar, abruptly terminated the dreams about the national title. The team lost the playoff finals against Krka. In the cup final, the club once again played against Olimpija, and lost. After the season, the club underwent sizeable changes. The head coach Aleš Pipan was replaced by Boris Zrinski, who was also the head coach of the national team. Several players left the club, among them Miljan Goljović, Gregor Hafnar, Aleš Kunc, Vid Žarković and Boštjan Nachbar.

== Honours ==
League

- Slovenian First League

Runners-up: 1998–99, 1999–2000, 2003–04, 2015–16

Cup

- Slovenian Cup

Winners: 2004
Runners-up: 1998, 1999, 2000, 2005, 2006, 2010, 2015

- Slovenian Supercup

Runners-up: 2004, 2005

- Alpe Adria Cup

Winners: 2017–18
Runners-up: 2015–16

== Season-by-season records ==
Season	Tier	Division	Pos.	Postseason	National cup	International competitions
1991–92	3	2 .SKL – East	3	—	First round	—
1992–93	3	2 .SKL – East	4	—	Quarterfinals	—
1993–94	3	2. SKL	1	Promoted	Third round	—
1994–95	2	2. A SKL	3	—	Second round	—
1995–96	2	2. A SKL	2	Promoted	Fourth round	—
1996–97	1	1. SKL	3	Semifinals	Fourth round	—
1997–98	1	1. SKL	3	Semifinals	Runners-up	EuroCup round of 32
1998–99	1	1. SKL	2	Runners-up	Runners-up	Saporta Cup quarterfinals
1999–00	1	1. SKL	1	Runners-up	Runners-up	Euroleague group stage
2000–01	1	1. SKL	4	Semifinals	Quarterfinals	Saporta Cup group stage
2001–02	1	1. SKL	3	Semifinals	Semifinals	Korać Cup semifinals Adriatic League semifinals
2002–03	1	1. SKL	3	Semifinals	Semifinals	ULEB Cup round of 16; Adriatic League 8th
2003–04	1	1. SKL	2	Runners-up	Winners	Adriatic League 6th
2004–05	1	1. SKL	2	Semifinals	Runners-up	ULEB Cup group stage Adriatic League 9th
2005–06	1	1. SKL	5	—	Runners-up	Adriatic League 14th
2006–07	1	1. SKL	4	Semifinals	Fifth round	—
2007–08	1	1. SKL	4	Semifinals	Quarterfinals	EuroCup elimination round 2
2008–09	1	1. SKL	4	Semifinals	Quarterfinals	EuroChallenge 1QR
2009–10	1	1. SKL	7	—	Runners-up	—
2010–11	1	1. SKL	4	Semifinals	Semifinals	—
2011–12	1	1. SKL	4	Semifinals	Semifinals	Adriatic League 14th
2012–13	1	Liga Telemach	4	Semifinals	Fourth round	—
2013–14	1	Liga Telemach	5	Quarterfinals	Fifth round	—
2014–15	1	Liga Telemach	4	Quarterfinals	Runners-up	—
2015–16	1	Liga Telemach	2	Runners-up	Semifinals	FIBA Europe Cup group stage Alpe Adria Cup runners-up
2016–17	1	Liga Nova KBM	4	Semifinals	Semifinals	Alpe Adria Cup semifinals
2017–18	1	Liga Nova KBM	10	Promotion/relegation playoff	Quarterfinals	Alpe Adria Cup winners
2018–19	1	Liga Nova KBM	8	Quarterfinals	Fourth round	—
