= MBK Komárno =

MBK Rieker Komárno
- Leagues: Slovak Extraliga
- Founded: 1991
- Dissolved: 2020
- History: MBK Rieker Komárno (1991–2020)
- Arena: Mestská športová hala
- Capacity: 1,475
- Location: Komárno, Slovakia
- Team colors: Red, White
- Championships: 1 Slovak League; 1 Slovak Cup; 1 Alpe Adria Cup
Home	Away

Mestský Basketbalový Klub Komárno, also known as Rieker Komárno for sponsorship reasons, was a Slovak professional basketball team based in Komárno. The team played in the Slovak Extraliga until being dissolved in 2020.

== History ==
In 2012, Rieker made its first Extraliga Finals appearance, but lost 3–1 to Prievidza. In 2013, Rieker lost 4–3 to Inter Bratislava in the Finals. In the 2014–15 season, the franchise got its first national title after beating Prievidza 4–3 in the Finals.

== Trophies ==
- Slovak Extraliga

Champions (1): 2014–15

- Slovak Cup

Winners (1): 2012–13

- Alpe Adria Cup:

Winners (1): 2016–17

== Season by season ==
Season	Tier	League	Pos.	Slovak Cup	European competitions			Other competitions	
2011–12	1	Extraliga	2nd						
2012–13	1	Extraliga	2nd	Champion					
2013–14	1	Extraliga	4th	Semifinalist					
2014–15	1	SBL	1st	Runner-up					
2015–16	1	SBL	2nd		3 FIBA Europe Cup	RS	1–5		
2016–17	1	SBL	2nd	Semifinalist				Alpe Adria Cup	C
2017–18	1	SBL	4th	Semifinalist				Alpe Adria Cup	RS
2018–19	1	SBL	6th	Quarterfinalist					
2019–20	1	SBL	9th						
