= Basketbal Pezinok =

- Leagues: Slovak Extraliga
- Founded: 1991
- Folded: 2010
- Arena: Hala Pezinok
- Capacity: 2,200
- Location: Pezinok, Slovakia
- Team colors: Green and White
- Head coach: František Rón
- Championships: 9 Slovak Championships; 7 Slovak Cups
- Website: Official website

Basketbal Pezinok was a Slovak professional basketball club, based in Pezinok, Slovakia. The club used to compete in the Slovak Extraliga. Pezinok is the most successful team in Slovak basketball history, having won a record 9 national championships. From the period 1996 til 2001, Pezinok was the Slovak champion for six seasons in a row.

In December 2010, the team was dissolved.

== Sponsorship names ==
- 1991–1992Lokomotiva Pezinok
- 1996–2005Slovakofarma Pezinok
- 2005–2007MBK Pezinok
- 2007–2008BK Skanska Pezinok
- 2008–2009AB Cosmetics Pezinok
- 2009–2010Basketbal Pezinok

== Honours ==
- Slovak Extraliga Championships: 9

1993, 1996–97, 1997–98, 1998–99, 1999–2000, 2000–01, 2001–02, 2007–08, 2009–10

- Slovak Cups: 7

1997, 1999, 2000, 2002, 2008, 2009, 2010
