= MBK SPU Nitra =

SPU Nitra
- Founded: 1952; 73 years ago
- Arena: City Hall
- Capacity: 1,500
- Location: Nitra, Slovakia
- Team colors: Red, Dark Navy, White
- Championships: 2 Slovak Championships; 1 Slovak Cup
- Website: www.mbknitra.sk
Home	Away

MBK SPU Nitra is a professional basketball club from Nitra, Slovakia. The team plays its games at the City Hall, which has place for 1,500 spectators. The club has won the domestic championship three times in its history. After the 2017–18 season, Nitra withdrew from the Extraliga.

== Honours ==
- Slovak Extraliga
  - Winners (2): 2004–05, 2008–09
- Slovak Cup
  - Winners (1): 2012

=== Notable players ===
Note: Flags indicate national team eligibility at FIBA-sanctioned events. Players may hold other non-FIBA nationalities not displayed.

Criteria

To appear in this section a player must have either:

- Set a club record or won an individual award while at the club
- Played at least one official international match for their national team at any time
- Played at least one official NBA match at any time.

- (Lebanon) Ater Majok

== Players ==
=== Current roster ===
Note: Flags indicate national team eligibility at FIBA-sanctioned events. Players may hold other non-FIBA nationalities not displayed.

SPU Nitra roster
Players	Coaches
Pos. / No. / Nat. / Name; SG / 1 / (United States) / Aaron Pervis Williams	Head coach: Vacant; Legend: (C) Team captain; Injured
