= Niké Aréna =

Indoor arena in Prievidza, Slovakia

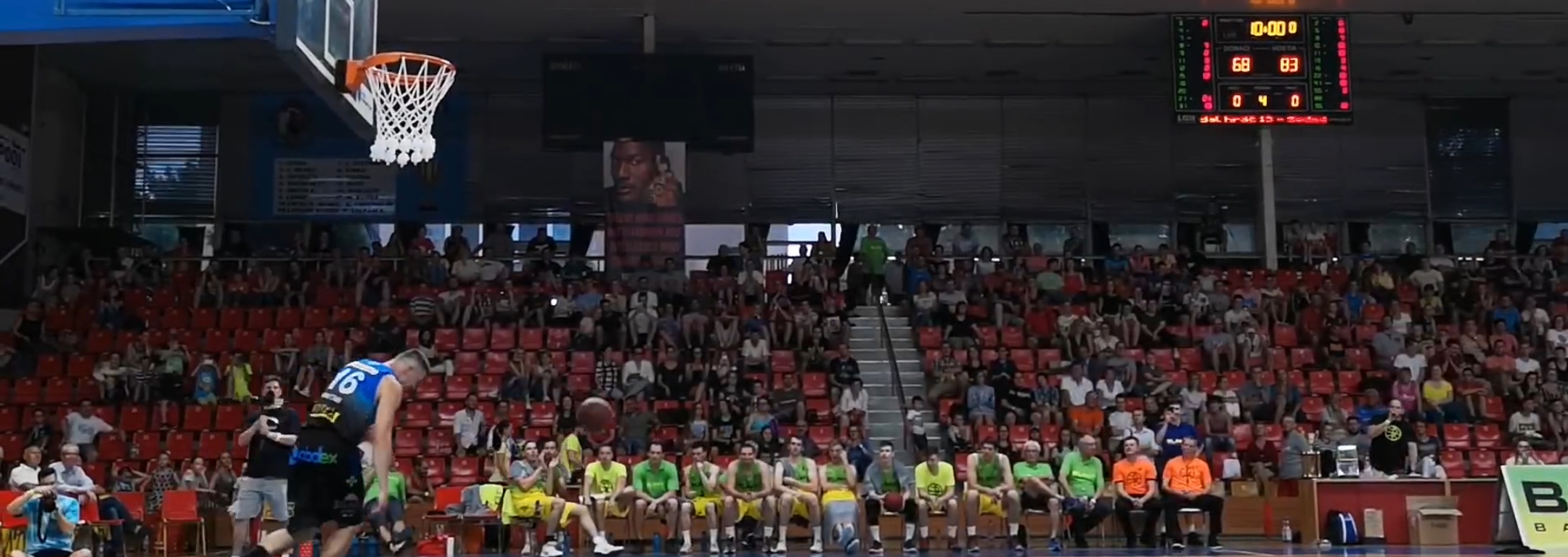
- Interactive map of Niké Aréna
- Full name: Niké Aréna Prievidza
- Location: Prievidza, Slovakia
- Coordinates: 48°46′39.31″N 18°36′10.97″E
- Capacity: 3,400

Tenants
- BC Prievidza, VK Prievidza

Website
- www.cityarena.sk

The Niké Aréna is an indoor arena located in Prievidza, Slovakia. It is used as a sports arena, and is the current home of the Slovak basketball club BC Prievidza. The arena has place for 3,400 spectators. The arena is named after the Slovak bookmaker Niké.

== Description ==
The multipurpose sports hall in Prievidza consists of several spaces that serve various purposes. The dimensions of the main deck are 46 x 23 m. The auditorium has 2,000 seats and 700 standing seats. The seating capacity can be increased to 3,400 seats.

== See also ==
- Eurovia Arena
- NTC Arena
- Steel Aréna
