= KB Košice =

- Nickname: Býci (The Bulls)
- Founded: 1994; 32 years ago
- Dissolved: 2018; 8 years ago
- Arena: Angels Aréna
- Capacity: 850
- Location: Košice, Slovakia
- Team colors: Red, gold, and white
- Championships: 2 Slovak Cups
- Website: www.kbkosice.sk

KB Košice was a Slovak professional basketball club, based in Košice. The team played in the Slovak Basketball League (SBL), the top tier. It played its home games at Angels Aréna, which has a capacity of 850 people. After the 2017–18 season, the team resigned from participation in the SBL, and folded.

== Honours ==
Slovak Basketball League

- Runners-up (1): 2017–18

Slovak Basketball Cup

- Winners (2): 2016–17, 2017–18
