= BKM Lučenec =

Slovak basketball club

- Leagues: Slovak Basketball League
- Arena: Športová Hala Arena
- Capacity: 900
- Location: Lučenec, Slovakia
- Head coach: Aled Jones
- Championships: 2 Slovak Leagues; 2 Slovak Cups
- Website: www.bkmlucenec.sk
Home

BKM Lučenec is a Slovak professional basketball club based in Lučenec. The team plays in the Slovak Basketball League (SBL). The club has won the national championship twice, in 2004 and 2006.

== Honours ==
- Slovak League

Winners (2): 2003–04, 2005–06

- Slovak Cup

Winners (2): 2004, 2006, 2022
