= BC Prievidza =

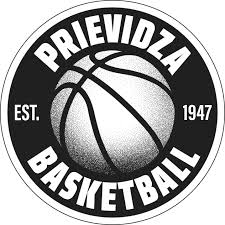
- Leagues: Slovak Basketball League; Europe Cup
- Founded: 1947; 79 years ago
- History: See Names
- Arena: Niké Aréna
- Capacity: 3,500
- Location: Prievidza, Slovakia
- Team colors: Black and white
- Main sponsor: Partners
- President: Ján Müller
- Head coach: Gareth Murray
- Team captain: Marek Jašš
- Championships: 4 Slovak Leagues; 2 Czechoslovak Leagues
- Website: www.pdbasket.com
Home	Away

BC Prievidza is a Slovak professional basketball club based in Prievidza, Slovakia. The team plays in the Slovak Basketball League. Prievidza plays their home games in the sports hall Niké Aréna, with a capacity of 3,500.

== History ==
The team was founded in 1947 under the name Sokol Prievizda. In 1989 the club won its first ever title in the Czechoslovak Championship. Prievizda won another title four years later (1993), which was also the last edition of the Czechoslovak Championship. In a separate Slovak top division, the club won its first title in the 1993–94 season. After relegation to the second division in 2004, the club renamed as the Hornonitriansky Basketball Club (HBK) Prievidza. From August 2009 the club is called BC Prievidza. In 2011–12 and 2015–16, Prievidza won the Slovak Championship.

== Names ==
- 1947–1952 Sokol Prievidza
- 1952–1953 Carpathia Prievidza
- 1953–1957 Tatran Prievidza
- 1957–1964 Lokomotíva Prievidza
- 1964–2004 Baník Cígeľ Prievidza
- 2004–2009 HBK Prievidza
- 2009–present BC Prievidza

== Honours ==
=== Domestic competitions ===
- Czechoslovak Championship
  - Winners (2): 1989, 1993
- Slovak Championship
  - Winners (4): 1994, 1995, 2012, 2016

== Season by season ==
Season	Tier	League	Pos.	Slovak Cup	European competitions			Other competitions	
2011–12	1	Extraliga	1st	Runner-up					
2012–13	1	Extraliga	6th	Quarterfinalist					
2013–14	1	Extraliga	2nd	Quarterfinalist					
2014–15	1	Extraliga	2nd	Quarterfinalist					
2015–16	1	Extraliga	1st	Runner-up				Alpe Adria Cup	SF
2016–17	1	Extraliga	3rd	Semifinalist	4 FIBA Europe Cup	R2	4–8		
2017–18	1	Extraliga	5th	Quarterfinalist				Alpe Adria Cup	RS
2018–19	1	Extraliga	2nd	Semifinalist				Alpe Adria Cup	SF
2019–20	1	Extraliga	3rd	Semifinalist					
2020–21	1	Extraliga	6th	Quarterfinalist					
2021–22	1	Extraliga	8th	Relegation Contest					
2022–23	1	Extraliga	7th	Quarterfinalist					
2023–24	1	Extraliga	3rd	Semifinalist	4 FIBA Europe Cup	R1	4–2		
2024–25	1	Extraliga	4th		4 FIBA Europe Cup	RS	5–3		

== European competitions ==
Prievidza saw its first action in Europe, in the 1989–90 season, when it competed at the FIBA European Champions Cup. Prievidza won in the first round against Täby Basket, but was defeated by FC Barcelona in the Round of 16.

== Players ==
=== Current roster ===
Note: Flags indicate national team eligibility at FIBA-sanctioned events. Players may hold other non-FIBA nationalities not displayed.

BC Prievidza roster
Players
Coaches

Pos.	No.	Nat.	Name
F/C	1	(United States)	Tolbert III, Sage	27 – 16 July 1999
F	4	(United States)	Thomas, Devontrey	25 – 5 October 2001
PG	7	(Slovakia)	Hričo, Patrik	20 – 3 March 2006
C	8	(Angola)	Andre, Eduardo	25 – 17 May 2001
G/F	10	(Slovakia)	Novák, Dávid	23 – 16 May 2003
SF	13	(Slovakia)	Jašš, Marek (C)	36 – 5 March 1990
PG	15	(United States)	Toussaint, Joe	26 – 6 October 2000
G	17	(Slovakia)	Hlivák, Dalibor	31 – 25 May 1995
F/C	18	(Slovakia)	Mokrâň, Jakub	27 – 3 May 1999
F/C	23	(United States)	Smith, Naje	26 – 5 April 2000
C	24	(United States)	Maring, Bonke	26 – 6 May 2000
G	55	(Slovakia) (Canada)	Lewis, Jaaden	25 – 17 May 2001

Head coach

(Scotland) Gareth Murray

Assistant coach(es)

(Slovakia) Michal Suriak

Athletic trainer(s)

(Spain) Enric Orozco

Legend

- (C) Team captain
- Injured

- Roster
Updated: October 17, 2025

== Notable players ==
Note: Flags indicate national team eligibility at FIBA-sanctioned events. Players may hold other non-FIBA nationalities not displayed.

Criteria

To appear in this section a player must have either:

- Set a club record or won an individual award while at the club
- Played at least one official international match for their national team at any time
- Played at least one official NBA match at any time.

- (United States) David Godbold
- (Bermuda) Sullivan Phillips
- (Finland) Remu Raitanen
- (Iran) Michael Rostampour
- (Lithuania) Darius Dimavičius
- (Serbia) Miloš Babić
