= BC Slovan Bratislava =

Slovan Bratislava
- Nickname: Belasí (the Sky Blues)
- League: SBL; ABA League
- Founded: 1963; 63 years ago
- History: Inter Slovnaft (1963–1991); AŠK Inter Slovnaft (1991–2004); Inter Bratislava (2004–2025); Slovan Bratislava (2025–present)
- Arena: Gopass Arena
- Capacity: 5,500
- Location: Bratislava, Slovakia
- Team colours: Sky blue, white, dark blue
- Head coach: Dejan Jakara
- Ownership: JTRE sports & entertainment a.s.
- Championships: 4 Czechoslovak Championships; 5 Slovak Championships; 5 Slovak Cups
- Website: bcslovan.sk
Home	Away

BC Slovan Bratislava is a Slovak professional basketball club based in Bratislava. It currently competes in the Slovak Basketball League (SBL) and the ABA League. The club plays its home games at the Gopass Arena.

== Name through history ==
- 1963–1991: BK Inter Slovnaft
- 1991–2004: BK AŠK Inter Slovnaft
- 2004–2009: BK Inter Bratislava
- 2009–2025: BK Inter Bratislava o.z
- 2025–present: BC Slovan Bratislava

== Season by season ==
Season	Tier	League	Pos.	Slovak Cup	European competitions		
2013–14	1	Extraliga	1st	Semifinalist			
2014–15	1	SBL	3rd	Champions			
2015–16	1	SBL	3rd	Champions	3 FIBA Europe Cup	RS	1–5
2016–17	1	SBL	1st	Runner-up			
2017–18	1	SBL	3rd	Runner-up			
2018–19	1	SBL	1st	Runner-up			

== Honours ==
- Czechoslovak League
  - Winners (4): 1978–79, 1979–80, 1982–83, 1984–85
- Slovak League
  - Winners (5): 1995–96, 2012–13, 2013–14, 2016–17, 2018–19
- Slovak Cup
  - Winners (5): 1996, 2003, 2015, 2016, 2025

== See also ==
- Czechoslovak basketball clubs in international competitions
