= Slovak Basketball Cup =

Basketball competition in Slovakia

- Sport: Basketball
- Founded: 1996
- Country: Slovakia
- Continent: (European Union) Europe
- Most recent champions: Spišskí Rytieri (2nd title)
- Most titles: Basket Pezinok (7 titles)
- Related competitions: Slovak League
- Website: basket.zoznam.sk

The Slovak Basketball Cup is the top-tier level national domestic basketball cup competition, that is played between professional clubs in Slovakia. The first edition of the cup tournament was held in 1996.

== Cup winners ==
- 1996 Inter Bratislava
- 1997 Davay Pezinok
- 1998 Chemosvit
- 1999 Davay Pezinok
- 2000 Davay Pezinok
- 2001 Chemosvit
- 2002 Davay Pezinok
- 2003 Inter Bratislava
- 2004 Chemosvit
- 2005 Chemosvit
- 2006 04 AC LB Spišská Nová Ves
- 2007 Lučenec
- 2008 Basket Pezinok
- 2009 Basket Pezinok
- 2010 Basket Pezinok
- 2011 not held
- 2012 Nitra
- 2013 Komárno
- 2014 Iskra Svit
- 2015 Inter Bratislava
- 2016 Inter Bratislava
- 2017 Košice
- 2018 Košice
- 2019 Levickí Patrioti
- 2021 Spišskí Rytieri

== Titles by club ==
Club	Cups	Years
Basket Pezinok	7	1997, 1999, 2000, 2002, 2008, 2009, 2010
Iskra Svit	5	1998, 2001, 2004, 2005, 2014
Inter Bratislava	4	1996, 2003, 2015, 2016
Košice	2	2017, 2018
Spišskí Rytieri	2	2006, 2021
Levickí Patrioti	1	2019
Komárno	1	2013
Nitra	1	2012
Lučenec	1	2007

== See also ==
- Slovak Basketball League
