= MBK Handlová =

Slovak professional basketball club

Handlová
- Leagues: Slovak Basketball League
- Founded: 1941; 84 years ago
- History: Baník Handlová(–2015); MBK Handlová' (2015–present)
- Arena: Športová Hala
- Capacity: 1,200
- Location: Handlová, Slovakia
- President: Ing. Rudolf Vlk
- Website: mbkhandlova.eu

MBK Handlová is a Slovak professional basketball club, based in Handlová. The club currently plays in the Slovak Basketball League (SBL), the first tier of basketball in Slovakia.

== Notable players ==
- Aleksandar Zečević (born 1996), Serbian
