= BK Iskra Svit =

Iskra Svit
- Leagues: Extraliga
- Founded: 1947; 78 years ago
- History: AC Svit (1947–1957); BK Iskra Svit (1957–1979); BK Chemosvit (1979–2010); BK Iskra Svit (2010–present)
- Arena: Iskra Arena
- Capacity: 700
- Location: Svit, Slovakia
- Championships: 1 Slovak League; 1 Czechoslovak League; 5 Slovak Cups
- Website: iskrasvit.sk
Home	Away

BK Iskra Svit is a Slovak professional basketball club that is based in Svit, Slovakia. The club competes in the Slovak Extraliga. The club's full name is Basketbalový Klub Iskra Svit. The club was previously known as BK Chemosvit.

== Current squad ==
Note: Flags indicate national team eligibility at FIBA-sanctioned events. Players may hold other non-FIBA nationalities not displayed.

BK Iskra Svit roster
Players
Coaches

Pos.	No.	Nat.	Name
F	1	(Slovakia)	Daniel Kubasky
G/F	3	(Serbia)	Goran Vucicevic
PG	8	(Serbia)	Saša Avramović
F/C	10	(Slovakia)	Maurizio Galata
G	11	(Slovakia)	Roman Findura
F	13	(Slovakia)	Boris Scavnicky
G/F	14	(Slovakia)	Tomas Gajan
F	21	(Slovakia)	Marek Ivan
SG	24	(Slovakia)	Stanislav Baldovsky
C	27	(Slovakia)	Martin Bizub
F		(United States)	Phillip Carr
C		(United States)	Mason Stuteville
PG		(United States)	Isaiah Johnson

Head coach

(Slovakia) Michal Madzin

Assistant coach(es)

Milan Veverka

Legend

- (C) Team captain
- Injured

- Roster
Updated: 28 October 2018

== Honours ==
- Czechoslovak League
  - Champions (1): 1961
- Slovak Extraliga
  - Champions (1): 2003
- Slovak Cup
  - Winners (5): 1998, 2001, 2004, 2005, 2014

== Notable players ==
Note: Flags indicate national team eligibility at FIBA-sanctioned events. Players may hold other non-FIBA nationalities not displayed.

Criteria

To appear in this section a player must have either:

- Set a club record or won an individual award while at the club
- Played at least one official international match for their national team at any time
- Played at least one official NBA match at any time.

- (Germany) Anton Gavel (2009)
- (Israel) Anton Shoutvin (2016–2017)
- (United States) (Central African Republic) Johndre Jefferson (2011–2012)
- (United States) (Uganda) A'Darius Pegues (2014)
