= Spišskí Rytieri =

- Nickname: Knights
- Leagues: Slovak Basketball League; ENBL
- Founded: 2004; 22 years ago
- History: BK Spišská Nová Ves; 2004–2020; Spišskí Rytieri SNV; 2020–present
- Arena: Mestska Sportova Hala
- Capacity: 1,160
- Location: Spišská Nová Ves, Slovakia
- President: Rastislav Javorský
- Championships: 1 Slovak League; 2 Slovak Cups
- Website: www.basketsnv.sk
Home	Away

Spišskí Rytieri SNV (in English: Spišskí Knights SNV) is a Slovak professional basketball club based in Spišská Nová Ves. Founded in 2004, the team currently plays in the Slovak Basketball League, the highest tier of basketball in Slovakia. The team has won one national championship, in 2021.

The club was previously named BK Spišská Nová Ves, but in August 2020 its name was changed to Spišskí Rytieri. In the first season under the new name, Rytieri immediately won its first Slovak Basketball League championship ever. In the same season, the Slovak Cup was won as well, thus the team won the double.

== Honors and titles ==
Total titles: 3

=== Domestic ===
- Slovak Basketball League
  - Champions (1): 2020–21
- Slovak Cups
  - Winners (2): 2006, 2021

2024/25 European North Basketball League (0)

== Season by season ==
Season	Tier	Division	Pos.	Slovak Basketball Cup	European competitions		
2023–24	1	Slovak Basketball League	Runners-up				
2024–25	1	Slovak Basketball League	3rd		R European North Basketball League	RS	1–7
