= BK Patrioti Levice =

Patrioti Levice
- Leagues: SBL; Europe Cup
- Founded: 1941; 85 years ago
- Arena: Športová Hala Levice
- Capacity: 2,250
- Location: Levice, Slovakia
- President: Gabriel Földi
- Team manager: Ladislav Garaj
- Head coach: Michal Madzin
- Team captain: Boris Bojanovský
- Championships: 5 Slovak leagues 1 Slovak Cup
- Website: www.patriotilevice.sk
Home	Away

BK Patrioti Levice, commonly known as Levickí Patrioti, is a Slovak professional basketball team based in Levice. The team currently plays in the national top-tier Slovak Basketball League (SBL).

== Honours ==
- Slovak League
  - Champions (6): 2010–11, 2017–18, 2021-22, 2022-23, 2023-24, 2024-25
- Slovak Cup
  - Champions (2): 2018/2019, 2023/2024
- Alpe Adria Cup
  - Champions (1): 2021–22
  - Runners-up (1): 2017–18

== Current roster ==
Note: Flags indicate national team eligibility at FIBA-sanctioned events. Players may hold other non-FIBA nationalities not displayed.

Patrioti Levice roster
Players
Coaches

Pos.	No.	Nat.	Name	Ht.	Age
PF	0	(United States) (Nigeria)	Ohams, Chuba	2.02 m (6 ft 8 in)	28 – 22 December 1997
SG	1	(United States)	Chavez, Tahlik	1.88 m (6 ft 2 in)	25 – 10 January 2001
PG	2	(United States)	Hicks, Tony	1.85 m (6 ft 1 in)	32 – 15 March 1994
SG	3	(Slovakia)	Pažický, Patrik	1.93 m (6 ft 4 in)	24 – 3 April 2002
SF	5	(United States)	Brooks, Jalen	1.96 m (6 ft 5 in)	27 – 19 August 1999
SF	7	(United States)	Dorsey, Gabe	1.98 m (6 ft 6 in)	24 – 5 September 2002
PG	9	(United Kingdom)	Watson-Gayle, Jelani	1.81 m (5 ft 11 in)	28 – 9 September 1998
G	11	(Slovakia)	Volarik, Samuel	1.93 m (6 ft 4 in)	26 – 18 January 2000
PF	13	(Montenegro)	Tomašević, Bojan	2.03 m (6 ft 8 in)	25 – 20 June 2001
C	15	(Slovakia)	Bojanovski, Boris	2.21 m (7 ft 3 in)	33 – 15 April 1993
F	17	(Slovakia)	Gergely, Ladislav	2.00 m (6 ft 7 in)	20 – 5 December 2005
PF	31	(Slovakia)	Solčánsky, Samuel	1.98 m (6 ft 6 in)	22 – 2 November 2004
PG	32	(Slovakia)	Horvath, Filip	1.90 m (6 ft 3 in)	19 – 4 June 2007

Head coach

- (Slovakia) Michal Madzin

Assistant coach(es)

- (Slovakia) Ladislav Lutovský

Legend

- (C) Team captain
- Injured

- Roster
Updated: September 26, 2025

== Notable players ==
- (Estonia) Mihkel Kirves
- (Finland) Severi Kaukiainen
- (Finland) Aatu Kivimäki
- (Finland) Joel Mäntynen
- (Slovenia) Miha Lapornik
- (United States) D'Mitrik Trice
- (United States) Aaron Wheeler
