= Slovak Basketball League =

Eurovia SBL
- Founded: 1993; 33 years ago
- First season: 1993
- Country: Slovakia
- Confederation: FIBA Europe (Europe)
- Number of teams: 10
- Level on pyramid: 1
- Relegation to: 1. Liga
- Domestic cup: Slovak Cup
- International cup: FIBA Europe Cup
- Current champions: BK Patrioti Levice (7th title) (2025–26)
- Most championships: Pezinok (9 titles)
- Website: sbl.slovakbasket.sk

The Slovenská Basketbalová Liga (SBL) (English: Slovak Basketball League) is the highest level tier league of men's professional club basketball in Slovakia. The league was founded in 1993. MBK Pezinok is the league's most successful team, having won a league record 9 championships. Before 2014, the league was named the Extraliga.

== Current clubs ==
The following 10 teams participated in the 2024–25 Slovak Basketball League:

Team	City	Arena	Capacity
Handlová	Handlová	Športová Hala	1,200
Inter Bratislava	Bratislava	GoPass Aréna	5,500
Iskra Svit	Svit	Iskra Aréna	700
Komárno	Komárno	Mestská športová hala	1,475
Lučenec	Lučenec	Športová Hala Arena	900
NEXTGEN Slovakia	Nitra	MŠH Nitra	1,500
Nitra Blue Wings	Nitra	MŠH Nitra	1,500
Patrioti Levice	Levice	HALEON Aréna	2,250
Prievidza	Prievidza	MŠH Prievidza	3,400
Spišskí Rytieri	Spišská Nová Ves	Mestska Sportova Hala	1,160

== Finals ==
Season	Champions	Runners-up	Finals score
1993	BK Davay Pezinok	VŠDS Žilina	
1993–94	BC Prievidza	Slovakofarma Pezinok	
1994–95	BC Prievidza	Slovakofarma Pezinok	
1995–96	Inter Bratislava	BC Prievidza	
1996–97	Slovakofarma Pezinok	Chemosvit Svit	
1997–98	Slovakofarma Pezinok	Chemosvit Svit	
1998–99	Slovakofarma Pezinok	Inter Bratislava	
1999–00	Slovakofarma Pezinok	Inter Bratislava	
2000–01	Slovakofarma Pezinok	Chemosvit Svit	
2001–02	Slovakofarma Pezinok	Chemosvit Svit	
2002–03	Chemosvit Svit	MBK Lučenec	
2003–04	MBK Lučenec	Chemosvit Svit	
2004–05	SPU Nitra	Baník Handlová	
2005–06	MBK Lučenec	Baník Handlová	
2006–07	Slávia TU Košice	Inter Bratislava	4–0
2007–08	Skanska Pezinok	Inter Bratislava	3–1
2008–09	SPU Nitra	AB Cosmetics Pezinok	3–2
2009–10	Basketbal Pezinok	SPU Nitra	3–2
2010–11	Astrum Levice	SPU Nitra	3–2
2011–12	BC Prievidza	Rieker Komárno	3–1
2012–13	Inter Bratislava	Rieker Komárno	4–3
2013–14	Inter Bratislava	Prievidza	4–0
2014–15	Rieker Komárno	Prievidza	4–3
2015–16	BC Prievidza	Rieker Komárno	4–1
2016–17	Inter Bratislava	Rieker Komárno	4–1
2017–18	Levickí Patrioti	Košice	4–1
2018–19	Inter Bratislava	Prievidza	4–0
2019–20	Not awarded due to the COVID-19 pandemic		
2020–21	Spišskí Rytieri	Patrioti Levice	3–1
2021–22	Patrioti Levice	Lučenec	4–1
2022–23	Patrioti Levice	Rieker Komárno	4–3
2023–24	Patrioti Levice	Spišskí Rytieri	3–1
2024–25	Patrioti Levice	Inter Bratislava	3–2
2025–26	Patrioti Levice	Slovan Bratislava	4–1

== Performance by club ==
Team	Winners	Runners-up	Years winner
Pezinok	9	3	1993, 1997, 1998, 1999, 2000, 2001, 2002, 2008, 2010
Patrioti Levice	7	1	2011, 2018, 2022, 2023, 2024, 2025, 2026
Inter Bratislava	5	5	1996, 2013, 2014, 2017, 2019
Prievidza	4	5	1994, 1995, 2012, 2016
Nitra	2	2	2005, 2009
Lučenec	2	2	2004, 2006
Svit	1	5	2003
Komárno	1	4	2015
Košice	1	1	2007
Spišskí Rytieri	1	0	2021
Handlová	0	2	
Žilina	0	1	

== See also ==
- Slovak Cup
