= 2007–08 Russian Basketball Super League transfers =

This is the transfer campaign from Russian Basketball Super League 2007/2008:

== CSKA Moscow ==
=== In ===
- (Lithuania) Ramūnas Šiškauskas - Signed From (Greece) Panathinaikos
- (United States) Marcus Goree - Signed From (Italy) Benetton Treviso
- (Greece) Nikos Zisis - Signed From (Italy) Benetton Treviso
- (Russia) Alexey Shved - Signed From (Russia) Khimki Moscow Region
- (Russia) Artem Zabelin - Signed From (Russia) Avtodor Saratov
- (Belgium) Tomas Van Den Spiegel - Signed From (Poland) Prokom
- (Russia) Viktor Khryapa - Signed From (United States) Chicago Bulls

=== Out ===
- ~~(Belgium) Tomas Van Den Spiegel - Transferred To (Poland) Prokom~~
- (Venezuela) Óscar Torres - Transferred To (Italy) Fortitudo Bologna
- (Russia) Anton Ponkrashov - Loaned To (Russia) Khimki Moscow Region
- (United States) David Vanterpool
- (Russia) Nikita Kurbanov - Loaned To (Russia) UNICS Kazan

== UNICS Kazan ==
=== In ===
- (Romania) Virgil Stanescu - Signed From (Russia) Spartak Primorje
- (Russia) Viktor Keirou - Signed From (Russia) Spartak Primorje
- (France) (United States) Tariq Kirksay - Signed From (France) SLUC Nancy
- (United States) Joseph Forte - Signed From (Italy) Montepaschi Siena
- (Russia) Nikolay Padius - Signed From (Russia) Triumph Lyubertsy
- (Russia) Pavel Sergeev - Signed From (Russia) Spartak St. Petersburg
- (Slovenia) Marko Tušek - Signed From (Spain) ViveMenorca
- (Serbia) Aco Petrović (Head Coach) - Signed From (Russia) Lokomotiv Rostov
- (Russia) Nikita Kurbanov - Signed From (Russia) CSKA Moscow

=== Out ===
- (Russia) Petr Samoylenko - Transferred To (Russia) Dynamo Moscow
- (Lithuania) Kšyštof Lavrinovič - Transferred To (Italy) Montepaschi Siena
- (Belarus) Yahor Meshcharnakou - Transferred To (Ukraine) Azovmash Mariupol
- (United States) Jarod Stevenson - Transferred To (Spain) Akasvayu Girona
- (Lithuania) Saulius Štombergas - Retired
- (Russia) Aleksander Miloserdov - Transferred To (Russia) Universitet Yugra
- (Lithuania) Antanas Sireika (Head Coach)

== Khimki Moscow Region ==
=== In ===
- (Russia) Anton Ponkrashov - Loaned From CSKA Moscow
- (Russia) Nikita Shabalkin - Signed From (Russia) CSK VSS Samara
- (Russia) Nikita Morgunov - Signed From (Russia) Triumph Lyubertsy
- (Finland) Teemu Rannikko - Signed From (Slovenia) Olimpija Ljubljana
- (United States) Daniel Ewing - Signed From (United States) Los Angeles Clippers
- (United States) (North Macedonia) Mike Wilkinson - Signed From (Greece) Aris Thessaloniki
- (Republic of Ireland) (United States) Pat Burke - Signed From (United States) Phoenix Suns

=== Out ===
- (Italy) Gianmarco Pozzecco - Transferred To (Italy) UPEA Capo
- (Russia) Alexey Shved - Transferred To (Russia) CSKA Moscow
- (Argentina) (Poland) Rubén Wolkowyski - Transferred To (Poland) Prokom
- (United States) Melvin Booker - Transferred To (Italy) Armani Jeans Milano

== Dynamo Moscow ==
=== In ===
- (Serbia) Svetislav Pešić (Head Coach) - Signed From (Spain) Akasvayu Girona
- (Russia) Petr Samoylenko - Signed From (Russia) UNICS Kazan
- (United States) (Bosnia and Herzegovina) Henry Domercant - Signed From (Greece) Olympiacos
- (Serbia) Aleksandr Rasič - Signed From (Turkey) Efes Pilsen
- (Croatia) Nikola Prkačin - Signed From (Turkey) Efes Pilsen
- (Lithuania) Robertas Javtokas - Signed From (Greece) Panathinaikos
- (Serbia) Miloš Vujanić - Signed From (Greece) Panathinaikos

=== Out ===
- (Serbia) Dušan Ivković (Head Coach) - Transferred To Serbia national basketball team
- (Serbia) Bojan Popović - Transferred To (Spain) Unicaja Málaga
- (United States) Eddie Gill - Transferred To (United States) New Jersey Nets
- (United States) Taquan Dean - Transferred To (Italy) Casale Monferrato
- (Greece) Lazaros Papadopoulos - Transferred To (Spain) Real Madrid
- (Russia) Andrei Trushkin - Transferred To (Russia) CSK VSS Samara
- (Serbia) Miroslav Raičević - Transferred To (Italy) Napoli
- (Serbia) Aleksandar Rašić - Loaned To (Germany) ALBA Berlin

== Lokomotiv Rostov ==
=== In ===
- (Russia) Oleg Meleschenko (Head Coach) - Signed From (Russia) Khimki Moscow Region
- (Russia) (Uzbekistan) Sergei Karaulov - Signed From (Russia) Standart Samara
- (United States) Anthony Goldwire - Signed From (Greece) Panellinios
- (Poland) Szymon Szewczyk - Signed From (Italy) Scafati
- (Greece) Nestoras Kommatos - Signed From (Greece) AEK
- (United States) Junior Harrington - Signed From (United States) Memphis Grizzlies
- (Greece) Dimitris Marmarinos

=== Out ===
- (Serbia) Aco Petrović (Head Coach) - Transferred To (Russia) UNICS Kazan
- (Russia) Sergei Toporov - Transferred To (Russia) Triumph
- (United States) Maurice Bailey - Transferred To (Slovenia) Olimpija Ljubljana
- (Greece) Vangelis Sklavos - Transferred To (Greece) Panellinios
- (United States) Omar Sneed - Transferred To (Iran) Kaveh

== Triumph Lyubertsy ==
=== In ===
- (United States) Mire Chatman - Signed From (Italy) Lottomatica Virtus Roma
- (Bosnia and Herzegovina) (Serbia) Ognjen Aškrabić - Signed From (Italy) Lottomatica Virtus Roma
- (Russia) Sergei Toporov - Signed From (Russia) Lokomotiv Rostov
- (Russia) Egor Vyaltsev - Signed From (Russia) Ural Great
- (United States) Terrell Lyday - Signed From (Italy) Benetton Treviso
- (Serbia) Nikola Vasic - Signed From (Spain) Alicante
- (Slovenia) Uroš Slokar - Signed From (Canada) Toronto Raptors
- (Russia) Fedor Dmitriev - Signed From (Russia) Spartak St. Petersburg

=== Out ===
- (Russia) Nikolay Padius - Transferred To (Russia) UNICS Kazan
- (Lithuania) Giedrius Gustas - Transferred To (Latvia) Barons LMT
- (Russia) Sergei Demeshkin - Transferred To (Russia) CSK VSS Samara
- (United States) Roderick Blakney - Transferred To (Greece) Olympiacos

== Spartak Primorje ==
=== In ===
- (Croatia) Damir Miljkovic - Signed From (Greece) Panionios Forthnet
- (Lithuania) Vidas Ginevičius - Signed From (Greece) Panionios Forthnet
- (Russia) Alexei Ekimov - Signed From (Russia) Spartak St. Petersburg
- (Russia) (Kazakhstan) Stanislav Makshantsev - Signed From (Russia) Ural Great
- (Russia) Aleksandr Fomin - Signed From (Russia) Ural Great
- (United States) J. R. Bremer - Signed From (Bosnia and Herzegovina) Bosna
- (Russia) Vadim Panin - Signed From (Russia) UNICS Kazan
- (Slovenia) (Georgia (country)) Vladimir Boisa - Signed From (Italy) Montepaschi Siena

=== Out ===
- (Romania) Virgil Stanescu - Transferred To (Russia) UNICS Kazan
- (Russia) Viktor Keirou - Transferred To (Russia) UNICS Kazan
- (Russia) Andrei Tsypachev - Transferred To (Russia) Universitet Yugra
- (United States) Willie Deane - Transferred To (Bulgaria) Lukoil Academic
- (United States) Derrick Phelps

== Spartak St. Petersburg ==
=== In ===
- (Croatia) (Bosnia and Herzegovina) Damir Markota - Signed From (United States) Milwaukee Bucks
- (Russia) Konstantin Nesterov - Signed From (Russia) UNICS Kazan
- (Serbia) Milovan Raković - Signed From (Serbia) Mega Ishrana
- (United States) Joe Troy Smith - Signed From (Italy) Rieti
- (Italy) (Argentina) Antonio Porta - Signed From (Italy) Angelico Biella
- (Brazil) Rafael Araújo - Signed From (United States) Utah Jazz

=== Out ===
- (Russia) Fedor Dmitriev - Transferred To (Russia) Triumph
- (Russia) Pavel Sergeev - Transferred To (Russia) UNICS Kazan
- (Senegal) (Germany) Boniface N'Dong - Transferred To (Spain) Unicaja
- (Russia) Alexei Ekimov - Transferred To (Russia) Spartak Primorje

== Universitet Yugra ==
=== In ===
- (Russia) Aleksander Miloserdov - Signed From (Russia) UNICS Kazan
- (Russia) Andrei Tsypachev - Signed From (Russia) Spartak Primorje
- (United States) Chudney Gray - Signed From (Qatar) Al-Rayyan
- (United States) Rod Nealy - Signed From (Philippines) Ginebra Kings
- (United States) (North Macedonia) Kevin Fletcher - Signed From (Greece) Aris
- (United States) Jelani Gardner - Signed From (Cyprus) APOEL

=== Out ===
- (Russia) Vladimir Shevel - Transferred To (Russia) Ural Great
- (United States) Fred Warrick - Transferred To (Russia) Enisey
- (United States) Chad Austin - Transferred To (France) BCM Gravelines
- (United States) Rod Nealy

== CSK VSS Samara ==
=== In ===
- (United States) Alex Scales - Signed From (Greece) Aris
- (Russia) Sergei Demeshkin - Signed From (Russia) Triumph
- (Cameroon) (Russia) Cirill Makanda-Etogo - Signed From (Cyprus) Keravnos
- (United States) Marque Perry - Signed From (Turkey) Banvitspor
- (Israel) Yaniv Green - Signed From (Israel) Maccabi Tel Aviv
- (Russia) Andrei Trushkin - Signed From (Russia) Dynamo Moscow

=== Out ===
- (Russia) Nikita Shabalkin - Transferred To (Russia) Khimki Moscow Region
- (Russia) Aleksei Kiryanov - Transferred To (Russia) Sibirtelecom Lokomotiv
- (Belarus) Pavel Ulyanko - Transferred To (Ukraine) Lvivska Politekhnika
- (Russia) Oleg Baranov - Transferred To (Russia) Sibirtelecom Lokomotiv
- (United States) Kelvin Gibbs - Transferred To (Greece) Olympiada Patras

== Ural Great ==
=== In ===
- (Croatia) Drazen Anzulovic (Head Coach) - Signed From (Croatia) Cibona
- (United States) Andrew Wisniewski - Signed From (Croatia) Cibona
- (United States) Brent Wright - Signed From (Croatia) Cibona
- (Russia) Sergei Varlamov - Signed From (Russia) Standart Samara
- (Serbia) (Bosnia and Herzegovina) Vanja Plisnić - Signed From (Serbia) Hemofarm
- (Montenegro) Ivan Koljević - Signed From (Lithuania) Lietuvos Rytas
- (Russia) Vladimir Shevel - Signed From (Russia) Universitet Yugra
- (United States) (Belgium) Ralph Biggs - Signed From (Belgium) Charleroi

=== Out ===
- (Russia) Sergei Zozoulin (Head Coach)
- (Slovenia) Zagorac Zeljko - Transferred To (Poland) Anwil Włocławek
- (Russia) Egor Vyaltsev - Transferred To (Russia) Triumph
- (Russia) (Kazakhstan) Stanislav Makshantsev - Transferred To (Russia) Spartak Primorje
- (United States) (Czech Republic) Maurice Whitfield - Transferred To (Greece) Olympiada Patras
- (United States) Derrick Tarver - Transferred To (Italy) Legea
