= 2007–08 Russian Basketball Super League A results =

There are results from Russian Basketball Super League A 2007–08.

== Regular season ==
=== October ===
(All times given below are in local)

October 3
19:00

Report

Spartak Primorje	63–89	CSKA Moscow
Scoring by quarter: 22-25, 12-20, 9-19, 20-25

SK Olimpiets, Vladivostok
Attendance: 3100

October 5
18:30

Report

Enisey	63–89	CSKA Moscow
Scoring by quarter: 19-20, 14-16, 18-25, 12-28

Yarygin Sports Palace, Krasnoyarsk
Attendance: 3500

October 6
17:00

Report

Sibirtelecom Lokomotiv	60–104	CSKA Moscow
Scoring by quarter: 16-31, 11-24, 12-22, 21-27

SK Sever, Novosibirsk
Attendance: 4100

October 7
18:30

Report

Spartak Primorje	81–68	Spartak St. Petersburg
Scoring by quarter: 20-16, 23-13, 15-14, 23-25

SK Olimpiets, Vladivostok
Attendance: 2900

October 7
18:00

Report

Lokomotiv Rostov	77–75 (OT) (OT)	Ural Great
Scoring by quarter: 9-16, 15-15, 20-14, 24-23, Overtime: 9-7

SK Ekspress, Rostov-na-Donu
Attendance: 1500

October 7
17:00

Report

Triumph Lyubertsy	95–64	CSK VSS Samara
Scoring by quarter: 28-22, 18-15, 20-12, 29-15

SH Triumph, Lubertsy
Attendance: 2000

October 8
19:00

Report

Sibirtelecom Lokomotiv	66–121	Khimki
Scoring by quarter: 15-27, 13-26, 19-30, 19-38

SK Sever, Novosibirsk
Attendance: 2200

October 9
18:30

Report

Enisey	77–89	Spartak St. Petersburg
Scoring by quarter: 33-22, 20-20, 16-21, 8-26

Yarygin Sports Palace, Krasnoyarsk
Attendance: 3000

October 10
17:30

Report

UNICS Kazan	101–68	CSK VSS Samara
Scoring by quarter: 17-24, 25-12, 22-21, 37-11

Basket-Hall Arena, Kazan
Attendance: 3500

October 10
19:00

Report

Triumph Lyubertsy	101–81	Ural Great
Scoring by quarter: 29-16, 23-19, 25-30, 24-16

SH Triumph, Lubertsy
Attendance: 3500

October 10
19:00

Report

Universitet Yugra	79–86	Khimki
Scoring by quarter: 24-20, 16-21, 19-21, 20-24

SK Druzhba, Surgut
Attendance: 1000

October 13
18:00

Report

CSKA Moscow	92–69	Lokomotiv Rostov
Scoring by quarter: 31-13, 22-17, 23-22, 16-17

CSKA USH, Moscow
Attendance: 1500

October 13
18:00

Report

Dynamo Moscow	96–67	Enisey
Scoring by quarter: 26-17, 27-17, 21-14, 22-19

Krylatskoe Sport Palace, Moscow
Attendance: 1000

October 13
17:00

Report

Triumph Lyubertsy	90–70	UNICS Kazan
Scoring by quarter: 24-18, 25-27, 18-11, 23-14

SH Triumph, Lubertsy
Attendance: 1800

October 14
17:30

Report

Ural Great	69–53	Spartak Primorje
Scoring by quarter: 19-19, 17-10, 16-14, 17-10

UDS Molot, Perm
Attendance: 4500

October 16
19:00

Report

UNICS Kazan	86–85	Enisey
Scoring by quarter: 34-25, 16-23, 15-22, 21-15

Basket-Hall Arena, Kazan
Attendance: 2000

October 16
19:00

Report

Khimki	97–67	Spartak St. Petersburg
Scoring by quarter: 25-11, 27-20, 22-14, 23-22

DS Novator-2 Khimki
Attendance: 2500

October 16
20-15

Report

Dynamo Moscow	72–67	Lokomotiv Rostov
Scoring by quarter: 16-16, 13-20, 22-19, 21-12

Krylatskoe Sport Palace, Moscow
Attendance: 1500

October 17
19:00

Report

CSKA Moscow	97–62	CSK VSS Samara
Scoring by quarter: 31-13, 24-16, 14-20, 28-13

CSKA USH, Moscow
Attendance: 1000

October 17
19:00

Report

Triumph Lyubertsy	88–72	Universitet Yugra
Scoring by quarter: 24-18, 34-19, 24-17, 6-18

SH Triumph, Lubertsy
Attendance: 1000

October 19
20:00

Report

Sibirtelecom Lokomotiv	66–79	Dynamo Moscow
Scoring by quarter: 18-14, 10-20, 21-18, 17-27

SK Sever, Novosibirsk
Attendance: 3200

October 20
18:00

Report

UNICS Kazan	75–78	Khimki
Scoring by quarter: 19-17, 10-20, 14-21, 32-20

Basket-Hall Arena, Kazan
Attendance: 4000

October 20
18:00

Report

CSK VSS Samara	76–72	Spartak Primorje
Scoring by quarter: 20-20, 20-19, 14-17, 22-16

Sport CSK VSS, Samara
Attendance: 1000

October 20
17:30

Report

Ural Great	78–61	Spartak St. Petersburg
Scoring by quarter: 21-16, 21-23, 17-7, 19-15

UDS Molot, Perm
Attendance: 4000

October 20
18:00

Report

Lokomotiv Rostov	106–89	Enisey
Scoring by quarter: 28-32, 20-17, 25-18, 33-22

SK Ekspress, Rostov-na-Donu
Attendance: 1500

October 21
15:00

Report

Universitet Yugra	69–90	Dynamo Moscow
Scoring by quarter: 16-23, 21-21, 21-21, 11-25

SK Druzhba, Surgut
Attendance: 800

October 22
19:00

Report

Sibirtelecom Lokomotiv	80–96	Triumph Lyubertsy
Scoring by quarter: 23-22, 27-25, 15-26, 15-23

SK Sever, Novosibirsk
Attendance: 3200

October 24
20:15

Report

Ural Great	69–90	UNICS Kazan
Scoring by quarter: 8-24, 22-20, 25-25, 14-21

UDS Molot, Perm
Attendance: 5000

October 24
19:00

Report

Enisey	56–97	Triumph Lyubertsy
Scoring by quarter: 21-28, 16-22, 9-33, 10-14

Yarygin Sports Palace, Krasnoyarsk
Attendance: 1500

October 25
19:00

Report

Spartak St. Petersburg	86–83	Lokomotiv Rostov
Scoring by quarter: 21-26, 22-20, 19-17, 24-20

Yubileyny Sports Palace, St.Petersburg
Attendance: 1200

October 25
17:00

Report

CSK VSS Samara	71–76	Dynamo Moscow
Scoring by quarter: 16-18, 14-29, 22-13, 19-16

Sport CSK VSS, Samara
Attendance: 1000

October 26

Report

Universitet Yugra	67–91	UNICS Kazan
Scoring by quarter: 21-22, 14-20, 15-22, 17-27

SK Druzhba, Surgut
Attendance: 800

October 26
19:00

Report

Spartak Primorje	51–75	Khimki
Scoring by quarter: 6-22, 19-19, 11-12, 15-22

SK Olimpiets, Vladivostok
Attendance: 3000

October 27

Report

Ural Great	69–75	CSKA Moscow
Scoring by quarter: 14-19, 15-21, 16-13, 24-22

UDS Molot, Perm
Attendance: 4000

October 28
19:00

Report

Enisey	78–96	Khimki
Scoring by quarter: 21-26, 14-20, 25-25, 18-25

Yarygin Sports Palace, Krasnoyarsk
Attendance: 2500

October 29
19:00

Report

Triumph Lyubertsy	87–65	Dynamo Moscow
Scoring by quarter: 19-13, 28-18, 19-22, 21-12

SH Triumph, Lubertsy
Attendance: 2500

==== Standings after October ====
Pos	Team	%	Pts	GP	W	L	GF	GA	+/-
1	Triumph Lyubertsy	1.000	14	7	7	0	654	488	+166
2	CSKA Moscow	1.000	12	6	6	0	546	386	+160
3	Khimki	1.000	12	6	6	0	553	416	+137
4	Dynamo Moscow	0.833	11	6	5	1	478	427	+51
5	UNICS Kazan	0.667	10	6	4	2	513	457	+56
6	Lokomotiv Rostov	0.400	7	5	2	3	402	414	-12
7	Spartak St. Petersburg	0.400	7	5	2	3	371	416	-45
8	Ural Great	0.333	8	6	2	2	441	457	-16
9	Spartak Primorje	0.200	6	5	1	4	320	377	-57
10	CSK VSS Samara	0.200	6	5	1	4	341	441	-100
11	Enisey	0.000	7	7	0	7	515	659	-144
12	Universitet Yugra	0.000	4	4	0	4	287	355	-68
13	Sibirtelecom Lokomotiv	0.000	4	4	0	4	272	400	-128

=== November ===
November 2
19:00

Report

Khimki	91–67	CSK VSS Samara
Scoring by quarter: 25-17, 25-15, 18-16, 23-19

DS Novator-2, Khimki
Attendance: 2500

November 2
20:15

Report

Dynamo Moscow	86–66	Spartak St. Petersburg
Scoring by quarter: 20-20, 23-27, 21-12, 22-7

Krylatskoe Sport Palace, Moscow
Attendance: 2000

November 3
17:00

Report

UNICS Kazan	77–83	Lokomotiv Rostov
Scoring by quarter: 14-11, 18-23, 22-23, 23-26

Basket-Hall Arena, Kazan
Attendance: 3500

November 3
18:00

Report

CSKA Moscow	93–74	Triumph Lyubertsy
Scoring by quarter: 27-18, 22-20, 26-17, 18-19

CSKA USH, Moscow
Attendance: 5000

November 3
18:00

Report

Spartak Primorje	88–78	Enisey
Scoring by quarter: 21-23, 24-21, 20-15, 23-19

SK Olimpiets, Vladivostok
Attendance: 2900

November 3
17:30

Report

Ural Great	73–67	Universitet Yugra
Scoring by quarter: 19-22, 21-12, 25-14, 8-19

UDS Molot, Perm
Attendance: 4000

November 7
19:00

Report

Lokomotiv Rostov	97–66	Sibirtelecom Lokomotiv
Scoring by quarter: 21-18, 23-15, 22-11, 31-22

SK Ekspress, Rostov-na-Donu
Attendance: 1000

November 7
19:00

Report

CSK VSS Samara	76–69	Ural Great
Scoring by quarter: 21-10, 24-13, 18-24, 13-22

Sport CSK VSS, Samara
Attendance: 1500

November 9
19:00

Report

Enisey	91–96	Universitet Yugra
Scoring by quarter: 24-21, 20-27, 16-20, 31-28

Yarygin Sports Palace, Krasnoyarsk
Attendance: 1500

November 10
17:00

Report

UNICS Kazan	84–68	Spartak St. Petersburg
Scoring by quarter: 26-24, 20-10, 19-18, 19-16

Basket-Hall Arena, Kazan
Attendance: 2500

November 10
17:00

Report

CSKA Moscow	80–82	Dynamo Moscow
Scoring by quarter: 21-23, 24-20, 15-25, 20-14

CSKA USH, Moscow
Attendance: 4800

November 10
18:00

Report

Lokomotiv Rostov	80–92	Khimki
Scoring by quarter: 20-24, 22-25, 19-23, 19-20

SK Ekspress, Rostov-na-Donu
Attendance: 1500

November 10
17:00

Report

Triumph Lyubertsy	80–83	Spartak Primorje
Scoring by quarter: 23-23, 18-19, 13-14, 26-27

SH Triumph, Lyubertsy
Attendance: 1500

November 10
18:00

Report

CSK VSS Samara	101–81	Sibirtelecom Lokomotiv
Scoring by quarter: 27-17, 26-23, 18-23, 30-18

Sport CSK VSS, Samara
Attendance: 1500

November 13
19:30

Report

Ural Great	89–75	Enisey
Scoring by quarter: 17-16, 23-19, 20-15, 29-25

UDS Molot, Perm
Attendance: 4000

November 14
19:00

Report

Universitet Yugra	73–78	Lokomotiv Rostov
Scoring by quarter: 21-22, 12-23, 14-14, 26-19

SK Druzhba, Surgut
Attendance: 800

November 14
19:00

Report

CSK VSS Samara	80–69	Spartak St. Petersburg
Scoring by quarter: 15-14, 24-15, 28-19, 13-21

Sport CSK VSS, Samara
Attendance: 2000

November 16
20:15

Report

Dynamo Moscow	88–81	Spartak Primorje
Scoring by quarter: 25-24, 20-22, 23-21, 20-14

Krylatskoe Sport Palace, Moscow
Attendance: 2000

November 17
17:00

Report

Universitet Yugra	63–85	CSKA Moscow
Scoring by quarter: 11-24, 15-19, 20-21, 17-21

SK Druzhba, Surgut
Attendance: 1500

November 20
19:00

Report

Sibirtelecom Lokomotiv	97–85	Enisey
Scoring by quarter: 24-18, 24-26, 22-22, 27-19

SK Sever, Novosibirsk
Attendance: 1800

November 22
19:00

Report

Spartak St. Petersburg	85–78	Universitet Yugra
Scoring by quarter: 19-20, 22-17, 26-17, 18-24

Yubileyny Sports Palace, Saint Petersburg
Attendance: 2500

November 23
20:00

Report

Dynamo Moscow	55–74	Khimki
Scoring by quarter: 18-22, 11-13, 9-18, 17-21

Krylatskoe Sport Palace, Moscow
Attendance: 3500

November 24
17:00

Report

CSKA Moscow	93–61	UNICS Kazan
Scoring by quarter: 24-14, 26-17, 19-11, 24-19

CSKA USH, Moscow
Attendance: 3500

November 24
17:00

Report

Lokomotiv Rostov	57–73	Triumph Lyubertsy
Scoring by quarter: 9-23, 18-19, 14-17, 16-14

SK Ekspress, Rostov-na-Donu
Attendance: 1500

November 25
18:00

Report

Spartak Primorje	97–65	Sibirtelecom Lokomotiv
Scoring by quarter: 22-17, 18-20, 32-17, 25-11

SK Olimpiets, Vladivostok
Attendance: 2900

==== Standings after November ====
Pos	Team	%	Pts	GP	W	L	GF	GA
1	Khimki	1.000	18	9	9	0	90.0	68.7
2	CSKA Moscow	0.900	19	10	9	1	89.7	66.6
3	Triumph Lyubertsy	0.800	18	10	8	2	88.1	72.1
4	Dynamo Moscow	0.800	18	10	8	2	78.9	72.8
5	UNICS Kazan	0.556	14	9	5	4	81.7	77.9
6	Lokomotiv Rostov	0.500	15	10	5	5	79.7	79.5
7	Ural Great	0.444	13	9	4	5	74.7	75.0
8	Spartak Primorje	0.444	13	9	4	5	74.3	76.4
9	CSK VSS Samara	0.444	13	9	4	5	73.9	83.4
10	Spartak St. Petersburg	0.333	12	9	3	6	73.2	82.7
11	Sibirtelecom Lokomotiv	0.125	9	8	1	7	72.6	97.5
12	Universitet Yugra	0.111	10	9	1	8	73.8	85.2
13	Enisey	0.000	11	11	0	11	76.7	93.5

=== December ===
December 1
17:30

Report

Khimki	79–69	Triumph Lyubertsy
Scoring by quarter: 16-22, 27-7, 20-18, 16-22

DS Novator-2, Khimki
Attendance: 3500

December 1
17:00

Report

UNICS Kazan	72–77	Dynamo Moscow
Scoring by quarter: 19-26, 22-16, 13-19, 18-16

Basket-Hall Arena, Kazan
Attendance: 2000

December 2
17:00

Report

CSKA Moscow	78–65	Spartak St. Petersburg
Scoring by quarter: 30-15, 23-19, 13-18, 12-13

CSKA USH, Moscow
Attendance: 2000

December 4
19:00

Report

Spartak Primorje	66–70	Universitet Yugra
Scoring by quarter: 21-12, 15-13, 11-26, 19-19

SK Olimpiets, Vladivostok
Attendance: 2900

December 8
17:00

Report

UNICS Kazan	96–69	Sibirtelecom Lokomotiv
Scoring by quarter: 27-21, 26-18, 24-9, 19-21

Basket-Hall Arena, Kazan
Attendance: 2000

December 8
18:00

Report

Khimki	61–87	CSKA Moscow
Scoring by quarter: 15-23, 11-31, 23-16, 12-17

DS Novator-2, Khimki
Attendance: 3000

December 8
18:00

Report

Dynamo Moscow	93–82	Ural Great
Scoring by quarter: 23-18, 28-19, 20-20, 22-25

Krylatskoe Sport Palace, Moscow
Attendance: 1500

December 8
17:00

Report

Lokomotiv Rostov	94–91 (OT) (OT)	Spartak Primorje
Scoring by quarter: 17-15, 23-23, 22-12, 15-27, Overtime: 17-14

SK Ekspress, Rostov-na-Donu
Attendance: 1500

December 8
18:00

Report

CSK VSS Samara	98–69	Enisey
Scoring by quarter: 20-22, 28-15, 24-13, 26-19

Sport CSK VSS, Samara
Attendance: 1200

December 12
19:00

Report

Universitet Yugra	83–78	Sibirtelecom Lokomotiv
Scoring by quarter: 22-14, 25-17, 11-28, 25-19

SK Druzhba, Surgut
Attendance: 800

December 21
19:00

Report

UNICS Kazan	83–64	Spartak Primorje
Scoring by quarter: 24-22, 20-16, 21-9, 18-17

Basket-Hall Arena, Kazan
Attendance: 2000

December 22
17:00

Report

Spartak St. Petersburg	76–91	Triumph Lyubertsy
Scoring by quarter: 15-23, 19-14, 26-28, 16-26

Yubileyny Sports Palace, St.Petersburg
Attendance: 1700

December 22
17:30

Report

Ural Great	92–77	Sibirtelecom Lokomotiv
Scoring by quarter: 26-18, 26-21, 20-16, 20-22

UDS Molot, Perm
Attendance: 4500

==== Standings after December ====
Pos	Team	%	Pts	GP	W	L	GF	GA
1(2)	CSKA Moscow	0.917	23	12	11	1	88.5	66.0
2(1)	Khimki	0.909	21	11	10	1	86.4	70.4
3(4)	Dynamo Moscow	0.833	22	12	10	2	79.9	73.5
4(3)	Triumph Lyubertsy	0.750	21	12	9	3	86.8	73.0
5(5)	UNICS Kazan	0.583	19	12	7	5	82.2	75.9
6(6)	Lokomotiv Rostov	0.545	17	11	6	5	81.0	80.5
7(9)	CSK VSS Samara	0.500	15	10	5	5	76.3	82.0
8(7)	Ural Great	0.455	16	11	5	6	76.9	76.8
9(8)	Spartak Primorje	0.333	16	12	4	8	74.2	77.9
10(12)	Universitet Yugra	0.273	14	11	3	8	74.3	82.8
11(10)	Spartak St. Petersburg	0.273	14	11	3	8	72.7	83.0
12(11)	Sibirtelecom Lokomotiv	0.091	12	11	1	10	73.2	95.5
13(13)	Enisey	0.000	12	12	0	12	76.1	93.9

=== January ===
January 4
20:00

Report

Sibirtelecom Lokomotiv	98–79	Spartak St. Petersburg
Scoring by quarter: 20-25, 25-25, 30-15, 23-14

SK Sever, Novosibirsk
Attendance: 500

January 5
18:00

Report

Khimki	88–70	Ural Great
Scoring by quarter: 25-20, 25-12, 23-20, 15-18

DS Novator-2, Khimki
Attendance: 3000

January 5
18:00

Report

Dynamo Moscow	66–84	CSKA Moscow
Scoring by quarter: 18-19, 12-16, 23-26, 13-23

Krylatskoe Sport Palace, Moscow
Attendance: 5000

January 5
17:00

Report

Lokomotiv Rostov	93–63	CSK VSS Samara
Scoring by quarter: 30-9, 17-17, 20-15, 26-22

SK Ekspress, Rostov-na-Donu
Attendance: 1500

January 11
19:00

Report

CSK VSS Samara	63–78	UNICS Kazan
Scoring by quarter: 13-19, 17-23, 18-15, 15-21

Sport CSK VSS, Samara
Attendance: 1500

January 11
19:00

Report

Universitet Yugra	75–88	Triumph Lyubertsy
Scoring by quarter: 21-23, 16-20, 18-19, 20-26

SK Druzhba, Surgut
Attendance: 800

January 12
17:30

Report

Ural Great	83–79; OT (OT)	Dynamo Moscow
Scoring by quarter: 15-29, 25-13, 18-13, 8-11, Overtime: 17-13

UDS Molot, Perm
Attendance: 4500

January 12
17:00

Report

Spartak St. Petersburg	65–97	Khimki
Scoring by quarter: 18-19, 15-19, 13-36, 19-23

Yubileyny Sports Palace, St. Petersburg
Attendance: 1900

January 12
19:00

Report

Enisey	85–77	Sibirtelecom Lokomotiv
Scoring by quarter: 16-20, 25-26, 22-7, 22-24

Yarygin Sports Palace, Krasnoyarsk
Attendance: 2000

January 13
17:00

Report

Lokomotiv Rostov	64–75	CSKA Moscow
Scoring by quarter: 19-20, 16-17, 17-16, 12-22

SK Ekspress, Rostov
Attendance: 1700

January 18
20:15

Report

Dynamo Moscow	107–94; OT (OT)	Universitet Yugra
Scoring by quarter: 23-17, 24-23, 26-23, 15-25, Overtime: 19-6

Krylatskoe Sport Palace, Moscow
Attendance: 1000

January 19
19:30

Report

UNICS Kazan	63–61	Ural Great
Scoring by quarter: 15-12, 14-16, 23-16, 11-17

Basket-Hall Arena, Kazan
Attendance: 3500

January 19
18:00

Report

Khimki	106–92	Spartak Primorje
Scoring by quarter: 25-16, 23-16, 29-27, 29-33

DS Novator-2, Khimki
Attendance: 3000

January 19
18:00

Report

Spartak St. Petersburg	76–81	Enisey
Scoring by quarter: 19-14, 17-17, 16-23, 24-27

Yubileyny Sports Palace, St. Petersburg
Attendance: 1355

January 19
17:00

Report

Sibirtelecom Lokomotiv	81–97	CSK VSS Samara
Scoring by quarter: 28-18, 18-22, 19-27, 16-30

SK Sever, Novosibirsk
Attendance: 2200

January 25
20:30

Report

Ural Great	87–83	CSK VSS Samara
Scoring by quarter: 22-32, 23-7, 21-21, 21-23

UDS Molot, Perm
Attendance: 5000

January 26
19:00

Report

UNICS Kazan	63–75	CSKA Moscow
Scoring by quarter: 11-19, 22-20, 15-20, 15-16

Basket-Hall Arena, Kazan
Attendance: 5000

January 26
18:00

Report

Khimki	77–68	Lokomotiv Rostov
Scoring by quarter: 24-16, 14-14, 24-17, 15-21

DS Novator-2, Khimki
Attendance: 1100

January 26
18:00

Report

Spartak St. Petersburg	66–89	Dynamo Moscow
Scoring by quarter: 17-28, 17-17, 17-23, 15-21

Yubileyny Sports Palace, St. Petersburg
Attendance: 3000

January 27
17:00

Report

Triumph Lyubertsy	100–75	Sibirtelecom Lokomotiv
Scoring by quarter: 23-17, 22-16, 30-20, 25-22

SH Triumph, Lyubertsy
Attendance: 2000

January 27
15:00

Report

Universitet Yugra	97–88	Spartak Primorje
Scoring by quarter: 21-20, 26-26, 18-16, 32-26

SK Druzhba, Surgut
Attendance: 800

==== Standings after January ====
Pos	Team	%	Pts	GP	W	L	GF	GA
1(1)	CSKA Moscow	0.933	29	15	14	1	86.4	65.7
2(2)	Khimki	0.933	29	15	14	1	87.9	71.3
3(4)	Triumph Lyubertsy	0.786	24	14	11	3	87.8	73.3
4(3)	Dynamo Moscow	0.750	28	16	12	4	81.3	75.6
5(5)	UNICS Kazan	0.600	24	15	9	6	79.3	74.0
6(6)	Lokomotiv Rostov	0.500	21	14	7	7	79.7	78.6
7(8)	Ural Great	0.467	22	15	7	8	76.5	77.2
8(7)	CSK VSS Samara	0.429	20	14	6	8	76.4	82.8
9(10)	Universitet Yugra	0.286	18	14	4	10	77.4	85.3
10(9)	Spartak Primorje	0.286	18	14	4	10	76.4	81.3
11(11)	Spartak St. Petersburg	0.200	18	15	3	15	72.4	85.2
12(13)	Enisey	0.143	16	14	2	12	77.1	91.4
13(12)	Sibirtelecom Lokomotiv	0.133	17	15	2	13	75.7	94.1

=== February ===
February 1
19:30

Report

Ural Great	72–61	Triumph Lyubertsy
Scoring by quarter: 16-16, 24-14, 19-11, 13-20

UDS Molot, Perm
Attendance: 5000

February 1
19:00

Report

Dynamo Moscow	79–83	UNICS Kazan
Scoring by quarter: 18-21, 18-25, 15-21, 28-16

Krylatskoe Sport Palace, Moscow
Attendance: 2000

February 2
17:00

Report

CSKA Moscow	68–64	Khimki
Scoring by quarter: 13-15, 22-12, 12-19, 21-18

CSKA USH, Moscow
Attendance: 4000

February 2
17:00

Report

Universitet Yugra	94–89	Spartak St. Petersburg
Scoring by quarter: 24-25, 26-23, 22-23, 22-18

SK Druzhba, Surgut
Attendance: 800

February 2
18:00

Report

CSK VSS Samara	78–57	Lokomotiv Rostov
Scoring by quarter: 22-18, 18-16, 14-10, 24-13

Sport CSK VSS, Samara
Attendance: 1500

February 2
17:00

Report

Sibirtelecom Lokomotiv	79–78	Spartak Primorje
Scoring by quarter: 20-30, 20-14, 21-16, 18-18

SK Sever, Novosibirsk
Attendance: 500

February 9
17:00

Report

CSK VSS Samara	78–91	Triumph Lyubertsy
Scoring by quarter: 14-27, 19-24, 23-22, 22-18

Sport CSK VSS, Samara
Attendance: 1500

February 10
17:00

Report

Sibirtelecom Lokomotiv	78–87	Lokomotiv Rostov
Scoring by quarter: 14-24, 22-21, 22-23, 20-19

SK Sever, Novosibirsk
Attendance: 1800

February 11
17:30

Report

Khimki	93–54	Enisey
Scoring by quarter: 27-12, 23-10, 23-22, 20-10

DS Novator-2, Khimki
Attendance: 2500

February 12
19:00

Report

Spartak Primorje	71–67	Ural Great
Scoring by quarter: 13-15, 19-21, 16-21, 23-10

SK Olimpiets, Vladivostok
Attendance: 3100

February 14
19:00

Report

Enisey	66–84	Ural Great
Scoring by quarter: 18-26, 20-16, 12-25, 16-17

Yarygin Sports Palace, Krasnoyarsk
Attendance: 1800

February 14

Report

Spartak St. Petersburg	80–89	CSK VSS Samara
Scoring by quarter: 18-28, 19-19, 24-15, 19-27

Yubileyny Sports Palace, St. Petersburg
Attendance: 1100

February 15
19:00

Report

Triumph Lyubertsy	64–65	Khimki
Scoring by quarter: 8-14, 24-15, 19-16, 13-20

SH Triumph, Lyubertsy
Attendance: 3000

February 15
19:00

Report

Dynamo Moscow	121–85	Sibirtelecom Lokomotiv
Scoring by quarter: 30-14, 35-20, 23-20, 33-31

Krylatskoe Sport Palace, Moscow
Attendance: 1000

February 16
19:00

Report

UNICS Kazan	108–73	Universitet Yugra
Scoring by quarter: 30-12, 22-18, 33-15, 23-28

Basket-Hall Arena, Kazan
Attendance: 2000

February 16
17:00

Report

CSKA Moscow	130–61	Sibirtelecom Lokomotiv
Scoring by quarter: 28-10, 29-24, 36-12, 37-15

CSKA USH, Moscow
Attendance: 2400

February 19
19:00

Report

Enisey	82–92	Spartak Primorje
Scoring by quarter: 23-18, 20-20, 15-25, 24-29

Yarygin Sports Palace, Krasnoyarsk
Attendance: 1800

February 22
19:00

Report

Dynamo Moscow	103–75	CSK VSS Samara
Scoring by quarter: 32-23, 30-21, 25-12, 16-19

Krylatskoe Sport Palace, Moscow
Attendance: 1300

February 22
18:00

Report

CSKA Moscow	113–60	Enisey
Scoring by quarter: 33-19, 30-9, 30-15, 20-17

CSKA USH, Moscow
Attendance: 450

February 23
17:00

Report

Lokomotiv Rostov	59–76	UNICS Kazan
Scoring by quarter: 10-17, 19-18, 8-23, 22-18

SK Ekspress, Rostov-na-Donu
Attendance: 1500

February 23
17:00

Report

Triumph Lyubertsy	103–65	Spartak St. Petersburg
Scoring by quarter: 25-19, 27-18, 23-13, 28-15

SH Triumph, Lyubertsy
Attendance: 3000

February 24
17:00

Report

Sibirtelecom Lokomotiv	78–75	Universitet Yugra
Scoring by quarter: 17-17, 24-19, 15-11, 22-28

SK Sever, Novosibirsk
Attendance: 1200

February 29
19:00

Report

Sibirtelecom Lokomotiv	68–78	Ural Great
Scoring by quarter: 21-21, 17-21, 20-13, 10-23

SK Sever, Novosibirsk
Attendance: 900

==== Standings after February ====
Pos	Team	%	Pts	GP	W	L	GF	GA
1(1)	CSKA Moscow	0.944	35	18	17	1	89.3	65.0
2(2)	Khimki	0.889	34	18	16	2	85.6	69.7
3(4)	Dynamo Moscow	0.737	33	19	14	5	84.4	76.4
4(3)	Triumph Lyubertsy	0.722	31	18	13	5	86.0	72.6
5(5)	UNICS Kazan	0.667	30	18	12	6	80.9	73.4
6(7)	Ural Great	0.526	29	19	10	9	76.2	74.9
7(6)	Lokomotiv Rostov	0.471	25	17	8	9	77.6	78.4
8(8)	CSK VSS Samara	0.444	26	18	8	10	77.2	82.8
9(10)	Spartak Primorje	0.353	23	17	6	11	77.1	80.4
10(9)	Universitet Yugra	0.294	22	17	5	12	77.9	86.4
11(13)	Sibirtelecom Lokomotiv	0.190	25	21	4	17	75.5	94.3
12(11)	Spartak St. Petersburg	0.167	21	18	3	15	73.3	86.9
13(12)	Enisey	0.111	20	18	2	16	74.5	92.3

=== March ===
March 1
17:00

Report

CSKA Moscow	101–52	Universitet Yugra
Scoring by quarter: 25-12, 37-7, 21-13, 18-20

CSKA USH, Moscow
Attendance: 1000

March 1
18:00

Report

Khimki	77–71	UNICS Kazan
Scoring by quarter: 17-17, 21-25, 24-16, 15-13

DS Novator-2, Khimki
Attendance: 2500

March 1
17:00

Report

Triumph Lyubertsy	97–90	Lokomotiv Rostov
Scoring by quarter: 23-23, 33-23, 15-30, 26-14

SH Triumph, Lyubertsy
Attendance: 2000

March 1
18:00

Report

Spartak St. Petersburg	74–91	Spartak Primorje
Scoring by quarter: 23-25, 15-21, 16-24, 20-21

Yubileyny Sports Palace, St. Petersburg
Attendance: 750

March 6
19:00

Report

Lokomotiv Rostov	74–67	Dynamo Moscow
Scoring by quarter: 18-20, 16-12, 14-23, 26-12

SK Ekspress, Rostov-na-Donu
Attendance: 1500

March 7
19:30

Report

Ural Great	87–94	Khimki
Scoring by quarter: 21-24, 18-23, 19-22, 29-25

UDS Molot, Perm
Attendance: 5000

March 9
15:00

Report

Universitet Yugra	86–84; OT (OT)	Enisey
Scoring by quarter: 18-20, 20-12, 16-21, 20-21, Overtime: 12-10

SK Druzhba, Surgut
Attendance: 800

March 9
17:00

Report

CSK VSS Samara	70–97	CSKA Moscow
Scoring by quarter: 15-26, 18-31, 16-23, 21-17

Sport CSK VSS, Samara
Attendance: 2000

March 11
19:00

Report

Spartak St. Petersburg	86–75	Sibirtelecom Lokomotiv
Scoring by quarter: 17-19, 18-19, 26-17, 25-20

Yubileyny Sports Palace, St. Petersburg
Attendance: 950

March 14
19:00

Report

Khimki	96–74	Sibirtelecom Lokomotiv
Scoring by quarter: 27-15, 16-22, 31-12, 22-25

DS Novator-2, Khimki
Attendance: 2500

March 14
19:00

Report

Spartak Primorje	86–71	Lokomotiv Rostov
Scoring by quarter: 15-21, 24-19, 23-9, 24-22

SK Olimpiets, Vladivostok
Attendance: 2950

March 15
17:00

Report

CSKA Moscow	94–71	Ural Great
Scoring by quarter: 28-13, 29-25, 25-18, 12-15

CSKA USH, Moscow
Attendance: 2500

March 15
19:30

Report

UNICS Kazan	84–78; OT (OT)	Triumph Lyubertsy
Scoring by quarter: 20-21, 17-16, 19-17, 11-13, Overtime: 17-11

Basket-Hall Arena, Kazan
Attendance: 4000

March 16
18:00

Report

CSK VSS Samara	73–69	Universitet Yugra
Scoring by quarter: 19-20, 11-21, 19-17, 24-11

Sport CSK VSS, Samara
Attendance: 1000

March 17
19:00

Report

Enisey	63–76	Lokomotiv Rostov
Scoring by quarter: 19-18, 10-13, 17-20, 17-25

Yarygin Sports Palace, Krasnoyarsk
Attendance: 1500

March 22
18:00

Report

CSKA Moscow	97–71	Spartak Primorje
Scoring by quarter: 25-17, 30-21, 21-14, 21-19

CSKA USH, Moscow
Attendance: 1100

March 22
18:00

Report

Dynamo Moscow	69–70	Triumph Lyubertsy
Scoring by quarter: 22-19, 19-9, 10-19, 18-23

Krylatskoe Sport Palace, Moscow
Attendance: 4000

March 23
18:00

Report

Spartak St. Petersburg	74–91	UNICS Kazan
Scoring by quarter: 21-19, 19-25, 12-26, 22-21

Yubileyny Sports Palace, St. Petersburg
Attendance: 1200

March 23
17:00

Report

CSK VSS Samara	57–90	Khimki
Scoring by quarter: 18-26, 15-22, 6-22, 18-20

Sport CSK VSS, Samara
Attendance: 1000

March 23
15:00

Report

Universitet Yugra	102–104; OT (OT)	Ural Great
Scoring by quarter: 17-27, 33-22, 21-28, 26-20, Overtime: 5-7

SK Druzhba, Surgut
Attendance: 800

March 27
19:00

Report

Triumph Lyubertsy	71–81	CSKA Moscow
Scoring by quarter: 16-15, 22-17, 13-26, 20-23

SH Triumph, Lyubertsy
Attendance: 4000

March 27
19:00

Report

Spartak Primorje	85–75	Dynamo Moscow
Scoring by quarter: 23-18, 23-27, 14-21, 25-9

SK Olimpiets, Vladivostok
Attendance: 3000

March 29
17:00

Report

Lokomotiv Rostov	86–73	Spartak St. Petersburg
Scoring by quarter: 28-13, 17-17, 18-16, 23-27

SK Ekspress, Rostov-na-Donu
Attendance: 1500

March 29
17:00

Report

Universitet Yugra	98–104; OT (OT)	CSK VSS Samara
Scoring by quarter: 26-22, 17-16, 22-22, 24-29, Overtime: 9-15

SK Druzhba, Surgut
Attendance: 800

March 29
17:00

Report

Sibirtelecom Lokomotiv	81–106	UNICS Kazan
Scoring by quarter: 19-32, 13-28, 26-28, 23-18

SK Sever, Novosibirsk
Attendance: 2200

March 29
19:00

Report

Enisey	59–91	Dynamo Moscow
Scoring by quarter: 18-29, 13-25, 16-11, 12-26

Yarygin Sports Palace, Krasnoyarsk
Attendance: 1900

March 31
19:00

Report

Spartak Primorje	90–81	Triumph Lyubertsy
Scoring by quarter: 26-14, 25-30, 19-19, 20-18

SK Olimpiets, Vladivostok
Attendance: 3100

March 31
19:00

Report

Enisey	56–87	UNICS Kazan
Scoring by quarter: 8-18, 15-23, 17-23, 16-23

Yarygin Sports Palace, Krasnoyarsk
Attendance: 1500

==== Standings after March ====
Pos	Team	%	Pts	GP	W	L	GF	GA
1(1)	CSKA Moscow	0.957	45	23	22	1	90.3	65.4
2(2)	Khimki	0.909	42	22	20	2	86.2	70.2
3(5)	UNICS Kazan	0.696	39	23	16	7	82.4	73.3
4(4)	Triumph Lyubertsy	0.652	38	23	15	8	84.5	74.8
5(3)	Dynamo Moscow	0.652	38	23	15	8	82.8	75.7
6(7)	Lokomotiv Rostov	0.500	33	22	11	11	78.0	78.1
7(6)	Ural Great	0.500	33	22	11	11	77.7	77.9
8(8)	CSK VSS Samara	0.455	32	22	10	12	77.0	83.8
9(9)	Spartak Primorje	0.455	32	22	10	12	78.8	80.1
10(10)	Universitet Yugra	0.273	28	22	6	16	78.7	87.9
11(12)	Spartak St. Petersburg	0.182	26	22	4	18	74.0	86.7
12(11)	Sibirtelecom Lokomotiv	0.167	28	24	4	20	75.6	94.5
13(13)	Enisey	0.091	24	22	2	20	72.9	90.9

=== April ===
April 4
19:00

Report

Khimki	94–87	Dynamo Moscow
Scoring by quarter: 29-17, 27-29, 20-16, 18-25

DS Novator-2, Khimki
Attendance: 3500

April 5
17:00

Report

Lokomotiv Rostov	85–71	Universitet Yugra
Scoring by quarter: 25-21, 13-20, 29-14, 18-16

SK Ekspress, Rostov-na-Donu
Attendance: 1500

April 6
19:00

Report

Spartak Primorje	81–75	CSK VSS Samara
Scoring by quarter: 30-17, 21-23, 14-16, 16-19

SK Olimpiets, Vladivostok
Attendance: 3170

April 8
19:00

Report

Enisey	93–87	CSK VSS Samara
Scoring by quarter: 15-23, 34-21, 19-29, 25-14

Yarygin Sports Palace, Krasnoyarsk
Attendance: 1000

April 9
19:00

Report

Spartak St. Petersburg	86–84	Ural Great
Scoring by quarter: 21-9, 17-23, 21-23, 27-29

Yubileyny Sports Palace, St. Petersburg
Attendance: 1100

April 15
19:00

Report

Triumph Lyubertsy	104–74	Enisey
Scoring by quarter: 28-22, 26-14, 22-15, 28-23

SH Triumph, Lyubertsy
Attendance: 2500

April 15
19:00

Report

Khimki	101–67	Universitet Yugra
Scoring by quarter: 27-14, 31-20, 19-12, 24-21

DS Novator-2, Khimki
Attendance: 2500

April 15
19:30

Report

Ural Great	91–80	Lokomotiv Rostov
Scoring by quarter: 20-18, 27-19, 21-20, 23-23

UDS Molot, Perm
Attendance: 6000

April 15
19:00

Report

Spartak St. Petersburg	72–97	CSKA Moscow
Scoring by quarter: 19-28, 20-18, 21-29, 12-22

Yubileyny Sports Palace, St. Petersburg
Attendance: 4100

April 16
19:00

Report

Spartak Primorje	65–66	UNICS Kazan
Scoring by quarter: 25-14, 8-17, 15-17, 17-18

SK Olimpiets, Vladivostok
Attendance: 3150

==== Standings after April ====
Pos	Team	%	Pts	GP	W	L	GF	GA
1(1)	CSKA Moscow	0.958	47	24	23	1	90.6	65.7
2(2)	Khimki	0.917	46	24	22	2	87.2	70.8
3(3)	UNICS Kazan	0.708	41	24	17	7	81.8	73.0
4(4)	Triumph Lyubertsy	0.667	40	24	16	8	85.4	74.8
5(5)	Dynamo Moscow	0.625	39	24	15	9	83.0	76.4
6(6)	Ural Great	0.500	36	24	12	12	78.5	78.3
7(7)	Lokomotiv Rostov	0.500	36	24	12	12	78.4	78.4
8(8)	Spartak Primorje	0.458	35	24	11	13	78.3	79.4
9(9)	CSK VSS Samara	0.417	34	24	10	14	77.3	84.1
10(10)	Universitet Yugra	0.250	30	24	6	18	77.9	88.4
11(11)	Spartak St. Petersburg	0.208	29	24	5	19	74.4	87.0
12(12)	Sibirtelecom Lokomotiv	0.167	28	24	4	20	75.6	94.5
13(13)	Enisey	0.125	27	24	3	21	73.8	91.4
