= 2007–08 Russian Basketball Super League A =

The Russian Basketball Super League A 2007–08 was the 17th official season of Russian Basketball Super League A. In all there were 13 teams.

== Regular season ==
=== Results ===
	CSKA	UNICS	Khimki	Dynamo	Rostov	Triumph	Primorje	Petersburg	Universitet	Samara	Ural	Lokomotiv	Enisey
CSKA		93-61	68-64	80-82	92–69	93-74	97-71	78-65	101-52	97-62	94-71	130-61	113-60
UNICS	63-75		75-78	72-77	77-83	84-78	83-64	84-68	108-73	101–68	63-61	96-69	86-85
Khimki	61-87	77-71		94-87	77-68	79-69	106-92	97-67	101-67	91-67	88-70	96-74	93-54
Dynamo	66-84	79-83	55-74		72-67	69-70	88-81	86-66	107-94	103-75	93-82	121-85	96–67
Rostov	64-75	59-76	80-92	74-67		57-73	94-91	86-73	85-71	93-63	77–75	97-66	106-89
Triumph	71-81	90–70	64-65	87-65	97-90		80-83	103-65	88-72	95–64	101–81	100-75	104-74
Primorje	63-89	65-66	51-75	85-75	86-71	90-81		81–68	66-70	81-75	71-67	97-65	88-78
Petersburg	72-97	74-91	65-97	66-89	86-83	76-91	74-91		85-78	80-89	86-84	86-75	76-81
Universitet	63-85	67-91	79–86	69-90	73-78	75-88	97-88	94-89		98-104	102-104	83-78	86-84
Samara	70-97	63-78	57-90	71-76	78-57	78-91	76-72	80-69	73-69		76-69	101-81	98-69
Ural Great	69-75	69-90	87-94	83-79	91-80	72-61	69–53	78-61	73-67	87-83		92-77	89-75
Lokomotiv	60–104	81-106	66–121	66-79	78-87	80-96	79-78	98-79	78-75	81-97	68-78		97-85
Enisey	63-89	56-87	78-96	59-91	63-76	56-97	82-92	77–89	91-96	93-87	66-84	85-77	

== Relegation round ==
=== Standings ===
Pos	Team	%	Pts	GP	W	L	GF	GA
1	CSK VSS Samara	0.469	47	32	15	17	80.3	83.1
2	Universitet Yugra	0.375	44	32	12	20	81.6	87.0
3	Spartak St. Petersburg	0.250	40	32	8	24	76.8	86.2
4	Enisey	0.219	39	32	7	25	77.3	91.0
5	Sibirtelecom Lokomotiv	0.160	29	32	6	26	75.9	94.7

=== Results ===
	Samara	Universitet	Petersburg	Lokomotiv	Enisey
Samara		106-86	79-68	88-81	88-48
Universitet	98-93		75-68	110-76	111-72
Petersburg	91-88	75-86		95-74	88-89
Lokomotiv	82-81	92-86	80-98		81-82
Enisey	89-90	80-90	98-90	114-82	

== Playoffs ==
=== Bracket ===
Quarterfinals
1	CSKA Moscow	72	97
8	Spartak Primorje	66	73
5	Dynamo Moscow	59	82	84
4	Triumph Lyubertsy	72	75	66
3	UNICS Kazan	78	80	62
6	Ural Great	81	71	71
7	Lokomotiv Rostov	74	68
2	Khimki	92	83

Semifinals
1	CSKA Moscow	74	85 (OT)	76
5	Dynamo Moscow	59	78	62
6	Ural Great	78	90	87	70
2	Khimki	101	99	71	77

Final
1	CSKA Moscow	97	74	88
2	Khimki	76	66	78
Third place
5	Dynamo Moscow	68	76	78	86
6	Ural Great	92	61	60	74

=== Classification 5–8 places ===
Semifinals 5–8 places
8	Spartak Primorje	75	66	55
4	Triumph Lyubertsy	69	69	86
3	UNICS Kazan	69	62	77
7	Lokomotiv Rostov	62	68	65

5–6 places
4	Triumph Lyubertsy	80	77
3	UNICS Kazan	64	69
7–8 places
8	Spartak Primorje	92	75
7	Lokomotiv Rostov	101	80

== Individual leaders ==
=== Points ===
All Players

Rank	Name	Team	Games	Points	PPG
1.	(United States) Lee Nailon	Sibirtelecom Lokomotiv	12	264	22.0
2.	(United States) Zendon Hamilton	Enisey Krasnoyarsk	17	323	19.0
3.	(United States) Fred Warrick	Enisey Krasnoyarsk	24	419	17.5
4.	(United States) (Bosnia and Herzegovina) Henry Domercant	Dynamo Moscow	22	364	16.6
5.	(United States) J. R. Bremer	Spartak Primorje	23	372	16.2
6.	(United States) Alex Scales	CSK VSS Samara	23	363	15.8
7.	(United States) Andrew Wisniewski	Ural Great	23	362	15.7
8.	(Russia) Aleksandr Miloserdov	Universitet	22	326	14.8
9	(Poland) (Sweden) Maciej Lampe	Khimki	17	251	14.8
10.	(United States) Brent Wright	Ural Great	22	306	13.9

Only Russian Players

Rank	Name	Team	Games	Points	PPG
1.	(Russia) Aleksandr Miloserdov	Universitet	22	326	14.8
2.	(Russia) Sergey Chikalkin	UNICS Kazan	21	274	13.1
3.	(Russia) Stanislav Makshantsev	Spartak Primorje	24	300	12.5
4.	(Russia) Sergei Toporov	Triumph Lyubertsy	23	273	11.9
5.	(Russia) Ilia Aleksandrov	Sibirtelecom Lokomotiv	22	259	11.8
6.	(United States) (Russia) Kelly McCarty	Khimki	22	252	11.5
7.	(Russia) Sergei Vorotnikov	Lokomotiv Rostov	23	263	11.4
8.	(Russia) Vitaly Fridzon	Khimki	24	259	10.8
9.	(Russia) Aleksey Zozulin	Ural Great	24	251	10.5
10.	(Russia) Evgeniy Voronov	CSK VSS Samara	23	239	10.4

=== Rebounds ===
All Players

Rank	Name	Team	Games	Rebounds	RPG
1.	(United States) Joseph Blair	Spartak Primorje	19	177	9.3
2.	(United States) Lee Nailon	Sibirtelecom Lokomotiv	12	105	8.8
3.	(United States) Zendon Hamilton	Enisey Krasnoyarsk	17	142	8.4
4.	(Brazil) Rafael Araújo	Spartak Saint Petersburg	20	155	7.8
5.	(United States) Brent Wright	Ural Great	22	159	7.2
6.	(Poland) (Sweden) Maciej Lampe	Khimki	17	120	7.1
7.	(Russia) Maksim Krivosheev	Sibirtelecom Lokomotiv	23	157	6.8
8.	(United States) (France) Tariq Kirksay	UNICS Kazan	22	148	6.7
9.	(Australia) (Denmark) David Andersen	CSKA Moscow	18	120	6.7
10.	(United States) Kelvin Gibbs	Universitet	15	94	6.3

Only Russian Players

Rank	Name	Team	Games	Rebounds	RPG
1.	(Russia) Maksim Krivosheev	Sibirtelecom Lokomotiv	23	157	6.8
2.	(Russia) Andrey Trushkin	CSK VSS Samara	23	142	6.2
3.	(Russia) Aleksandr Savenkov	Universitet	23	134	5.8
4.	(United States) (Russia) Kelly McCarty	Khimki	22	123	5.6
5.	(Russia) Viktor Dubovitskiy	Sibirtelecom Lokomotiv	22	107	4.9
6.	(Russia) Stanislav Makshantsev	Spartak Primorje	24	112	4.7
7.	(Russia) Aleksey Zozulin	Ural Great	24	98	4.1
8.	(Russia) Fedor Likholitov	Triumph Lyubertsy	24	96	4.0
9.	(Russia) Alexander Dedushkin	Ural Great	12	48	4.0
10.	(Russia) Sergei Monia	Dynamo Moscow	23	90	3.9

=== Assists ===
Rank	Name	Team	Games	Assists	APG
1.	(United States) J. R. Bremer	Spartak Primorje	23	130	5.72
2.	(Greece) Theodoros Papaloukas	CSKA Moscow	19	102	5.4
3.	(United States) Lonnie Cooper	Sibirtelecom Lokomotiv	16	85	5.3
4.	(United States) Andrew Wisniewski	Ural Great	23	106	4.6
5.	(Russia) Anton Ponkrashov	Khimki	24	108	4.5
6.	(United States) (Russia) Jon Robert Holden	CSKA Moscow	24	107	4.5
7.	(United States) Daniel Ewing	Khimki	22	83	3.8
7.	(Bosnia and Herzegovina) (Serbia) Ognjen Askrabiĉ	Triumph Lyubertsy	22	83	3.8
9.	(United States) (France) Tariq Kirksay	UNICS Kazan	22	80	3.6
10.	(United States) Mire Chatman	Triumph Lyubertsy	22	79	3.6
