= FIBA EuroChallenge individual records =

This article contains all of the individual records of players in the FIBA EuroChallenge competition. The FIBA EuroChallenge was the 3rd-tier level European-wide professional basketball league. The league is now defunct.

== Points ==
Points	Player	Team	Game	Season
50	(United States) Deron Williams	(Turkey) Beşiktaş	vs (Germany) BG Göttingen	2011–12
42	(United States) Bryan Hopkins	(Belgium) Antwerp Giants	vs (Israel) Hapoel Holon	2012–13
42	(United States) Jerome Dyson	(Israel) Hapoel Holon	@ (France) BCM Gravelines	2012–13
42	(United States) Robert Arnold	(Finland) Joensuun Kataja	@ (France) JSF Nanterre	2014–15
39	(United States) Johnell Smith	(Denmark) Svendborg Rabbits	@ (Croatia) HKK Široki	2008–09
39	(Spain) Fernando San Emeterio	(Spain) Akasvayu Girona	vs (France) JDA Dijon	2006–07
39	(Bosnia and Herzegovina) Ernest Bremer	(Russia) Nizhny Novgorod	@ (Ukraine) Khimik	2003–04
38	(United States) Kendrick Johnson	(North Macedonia) KK Rabotnički	vs (Czech Republic) CEZ Nymburk	2004–05

== Rebounds ==
Rebounds	Player	Team	Game	Season
21	(Nigeria) Kenny Adeleke	(Turkey) Banvit Bandırma	vs (Iceland) K.R. Reykjavík	2007–08
20	(Panama) Jaime Lloreda	(Russia) Lokomotiv Rostov	@ (Belgium) Dexia Mons-Hainaut	2005–06
20	(United States) Randal Falker	(France) Cholet Basket	vs (Germany) Telekom Baskets	2008–09
20	(United States) Lance Williams	(Turkey) Banvit Bandırma	@ (Belgium) Generali Okapi Aalstar	2009–10
20	(United Kingdom) Pops Mensah Bonsu	(Turkey) Beşiktaş	vs (France) Élan Chalon	2011–12
19	(United States) Chris Ensminger	(Germany) GHP Bamberg	vs (Serbia) KK Hemofarm	2003–04
19	(United States) Travon Bryant	(Greece) Iraklis Thessaloniki	vs (France) Paris Basket Racing	2004–05
19	(United States) Art Long	(Ukraine) Azovmash	@ (Belgium) RBC Verviers-Pepinster	2004–05
19	(Panama) Jaime Lloreda	(Russia) Lokomotiv Rostov	vs (Croatia) KK Zadar	2005–06
19	(Croatia) Ante Tomić	(Croatia) KK Zagreb	vs (Czech Republic) BK Prostějov	2008–09
19	(United States) Sean Finn	(Switzerland) Lugano Basket	@ (Russia) Triumph Lyubertsy	2010–11
19	(Hungary) Márton Báder	(Hungary) Szolnoki Olaj KK	@ (Israel) Hapoel Holon	2012–13
19	(Netherlands) Stefan Wessels	(Netherlands) SPM Shoeters Den Bosch	@ (Sweden) Södertälje Kings	2014–15

== Assists ==
Assists	Player	Team	Game	Season
17	(Bosnia and Herzegovina) Damir Mršić	(Russia) Dynamo Moscow	vs (Czech Republic) ECM Nymburk	2003–04
17	(Panama) Travis Conlan	(Belgium) Liège	@ (Lithuania) Siauliai	2006–07
15	(United States) Khalid El-Amin	(Turkey) Besiktas	vs (Ukraine) Azovmash	2004–05
14	(Turkey) Hakan Köseoğlu	(Turkey) Tuborg Pilsener İzmir	vs (Israel) Bnei Hasharon	2004–05
14	(France) Eric Micoud	(France) JDA Dijon	vs (Greece) Ionikos	2004–05
14	(Israel) Avishai Gordon	(Germany) GHP Bamberg	vs (Serbia) KK Hemofarm	2003–04
14	(United States) Travon Bryant	(Israel) Galil Elyon Golan	vs (France) BCM Gravelines	2005–06
14	(United States) Jared Jordan	(Germany) Telekom Baskets Bonn	@ (Turkey) Pinar Karsiyaka	2011-12
14	(United States) Gregory Renfroe	(Latvia) VEF Riga	vs (Serbia) KK FMP Belgrade	2009-10

== Steals ==
Steals	Player	Team	Game	Season
10	(Croatia) Denis Mujagić	(Czech Republic) ECM Nymburk	@ (France) SLUC Nancy	2003–04
9	(United States) Joe Ira Clark	(Russia) Unics Kazan	@ (Israel) Hapoel Galil Elyon	2004–05
8	(Russia) Petr Samoylenko	(Russia) Unics Kazan	vs (Lithuania) Alita Alytus	2003-04
8	(United States) Alvin Young	(Israel) Bnei Hasharon	vs (Belgium) Dexia Mons-Hainaut	2004–05
8	(United States) Kelvin Gibbs	(Israel) Hapoel Tel Aviv	vs (Serbia) Lavovi	2004–05

== Blocks ==
Blocks	Player	Team	Game	Season
8	(United States) Vincent Jones	(Russia) Ural Great Perm	vs (Germany) GHP Bamberg	2003–04
8	(United States) Marcus Douthit	(Belgium) Verviers-Pepinster	vs (Russia) Ural Great Perm	2004–05
7	(Ukraine) Grigorij Khizhnyak	(Greece) Peristeri Athens	vs (Belgium) Dexia Mons-Hainaut	2003–04
7	(Lithuania) Grigorij Khizhnyak	(Russia) Ural Great Perm	vs (Belgium) Dexia Mons-Hainaut	2004–05
7	(United States) Kelvin Gibbs	(Israel) Hapoel Tel Aviv	vs (Israel) Strauss Iscar Nahariya	2003–04
