= 2011–12 PBL season =

PBL
- Season: 2011–12
- Dates: 6 October 2011–19 May 2012
- Games played: 110
- Teams: 10

Regular season
- Season MVP: (United States) Davon Jefferson

Finals
- Champions: CSKA Moscow (19th title)
- Runners-up: Khimki
- Third place: Lokomotiv Kuban
- Fourth place: Triumph Lyubertsy
- Playoffs MVP: (Russia) Alexey Shved

The 2011–12 Russian Professional Basketball League (PBL) was the second season of the Russian Professional League, and the 21st overall season of the Russian Professional Championship. CSKA Moscow won the title, by beating Khimki Moscow Region 2–0 in the league's playoff Finals.

== Format ==
Professional Basketball League 2011–12 – Club Locations

Because of the involvement of the senior men's Russia national basketball team at the Olympic qualifying tournament in 2012, the 2011–12 Russian Professional League was reduced to two playoff series.

All teams met each other at home and away venues. In the regular season, each team played 18 games.

== Teams ==
Team	Home City	Arena	Capacity
Triumph Lyubertsy	Lyubertsy	Triumph Sports Palace	4,000
Spartak Saint Petersburg	Saint Petersburg	Sibur Arena	7,044
Spartak Primorye	Vladivostok	SK Olimpiets	1,500
Krasnye Krylia	Samara	MTL Arena	3,500
CSKA Moscow	Moscow	Universal Sports Hall CSKA	5,500
Enisey	Krasnoyarsk	Arena Sever	4,100
Khimki	Khimki	Basketball Center	6,196
Lokomotiv Kuban	Krasnodar	Basket-Hall	7,500
Nizhny Novgorod	Nizhny Novgorod	Trade Union Sport Palace	5,600
UNICS	Kazan	Basket Hall Arena	7,500

== Regular season ==
Pos	Team	Pld	W	L	PF	PA	PD	Qualification or relegation
1	CSKA Moscow	18	17	1	1571	1234	+337	Qualification for the championship playoffs
2	Khimki	18	15	3	1465	1348	+117	Qualification for the championship playoffs
3	Triumph Lyubertsy	18	12	6	1461	1434	+27	Qualification for the championship playoffs
4	Lokomotiv Kuban	18	9	9	1384	1439	−55	Qualification for the championship playoffs
5	Spartak Saint Petersburg	18	9	9	1416	1366	+50	Qualification for the fifth position playoffs
6	UNICS	18	8	10	1316	1294	+22	Qualification for the fifth position playoffs
7	Spartak Primorye	18	8	10	1433	1460	−27	Qualification for the fifth position playoffs
8	Krasnye Krylia	18	7	11	1363	1449	−86	Qualification for the fifth position playoffs
9	Nizhny Novgorod	18	3	15	1335	1516	−181	
10	Enisey	18	2	16	1332	1536	−204	

Source: Eurobasket

== Championship playoffs ==
Semi-finals
1 CSKA Moscow	2
4 Lokomotiv Kuban	0
2 Khimki	2
3 Triumph Lyubertsy	0

Final
1 CSKA Moscow	3
2 Khimki	0
Third place
3 Triumph Lyubertsy	1
4 Lokomotiv Kuban	2

== Fifth position playoffs ==
First round
5 Spartak Saint Petersburg	2
8 Krasnye Krylia	1
6 UNICS	2
7 Spartak Primorye	1

Fifth position
5 Spartak Saint Petersburg	0
6 UNICS	2
Seventh position
7 Spartak Primorye	1
8 Krasnye Krylia	2

== Awards ==
=== Regular season MVP ===
- (United States) Davon Jefferson (Triumph Lyubertsy)

=== Playoffs MVP ===
- (Russia) Alexey Shved (CSKA Moscow)

=== All-Symbolic Team ===
- First Symbolic Team
  - (United States) Patrick Beverley (Spartak St. Petersburg)
  - (Croatia) Zoran Planinić (Khimki Moscow Region)
  - (United States) Davon Jefferson (Triumph Lyubertsy)
  - (Russia) Andrei Kirilenko (CSKA Moscow)
  - (North Macedonia) Jeremiah Massey (Lokomotiv Kuban)
- Second Symbolic Team
  - (United States) Torey Thomas (Spartak Primorye)
  - (Russia) Vitaly Fridzon (Khimki Moscow Region)
  - (Russia) Sergey Karasev (Triumph Lyubertsy)
  - (Russia) Victor Khryapa (CSKA Moscow)
  - (Belarus) Vladimir Veremeenko (UNICS Kazan)

== See also ==
- 2011–12 VTB United League
