= Aleksei Zozulin =

Russian basketball player (born 1983)

Free agent
- Position: Shooting guard

Personal information
- Born: January 14, 1983 (age 43) Alma Ata, Kazakh SSR, Soviet Union
- Listed height: 199 cm (6 ft 6 in)
- Listed weight: 100 kg (220 lb)

Career information
- NBA draft: 2005: undrafted
- Playing career: 1999–present

Career history
- 1999–2000: Khimik Engels
- 2000–2005: UNICS Kazan
- 2005: Lokomotiv Rostov
- 2005–2006: Sibirtelecom Lokomotiv Novosibirsk
- 2006–2008: Ural Great Perm
- 2008–2012: Spartak Saint Petersburg
- 2012–2015: CSKA Moscow
- 2015: Lokomotiv Kuban

Career highlights
- 3× VTB United League champion (2013–2015)

Alexey Sergeevich Zozulin (Russian: Алексей Сергеевич Зозулин, born January 14, 1983) is a Russian professional basketball player who last played for Lokomotiv Kuban of the VTB United League. He also represents the Russia national basketball team internationally.

== Professional career ==
Zozulin has spent his entire career playing for teams in the top division of Russian basketball. Career highlights include winning the Russia Cup with UNICS Kazan in 2003 and playing in the Eurocup with Ural Great Perm in 2007 and 2008. In his most recent season, 2008–09, he averaged 6.9 points and 2.4 rebounds per game for Spartak Saint Petersburg.

On 26 July 2012, Zozulin signed one-year deal with option to extend for one season with the Russian team CSKA Moscow. On 7 July 2014, he re-signed with CSKA for one more season and an option for another.

On 1 August 2015, he joined Lokomotiv Kuban on a one-year deal with a team option. On 25 December 2015, left Lokomotiv.

== National team career ==
Zozulin has also been a member of the senior Russian national basketball team. He was called up to the team for the first time at Eurobasket 2009. Although the Russians finished a disappointing seventh, they were later awarded a wild card to the 2010 FIBA World Championship.

Zozulin also played for the Russian junior team between 1999 and 2002, most notably appearing with the team at the World Championship for Junior Men in 2000 and World Championship for Young Men in 2002.
