= Gundars Vētra =

Latvian basketball player and coach

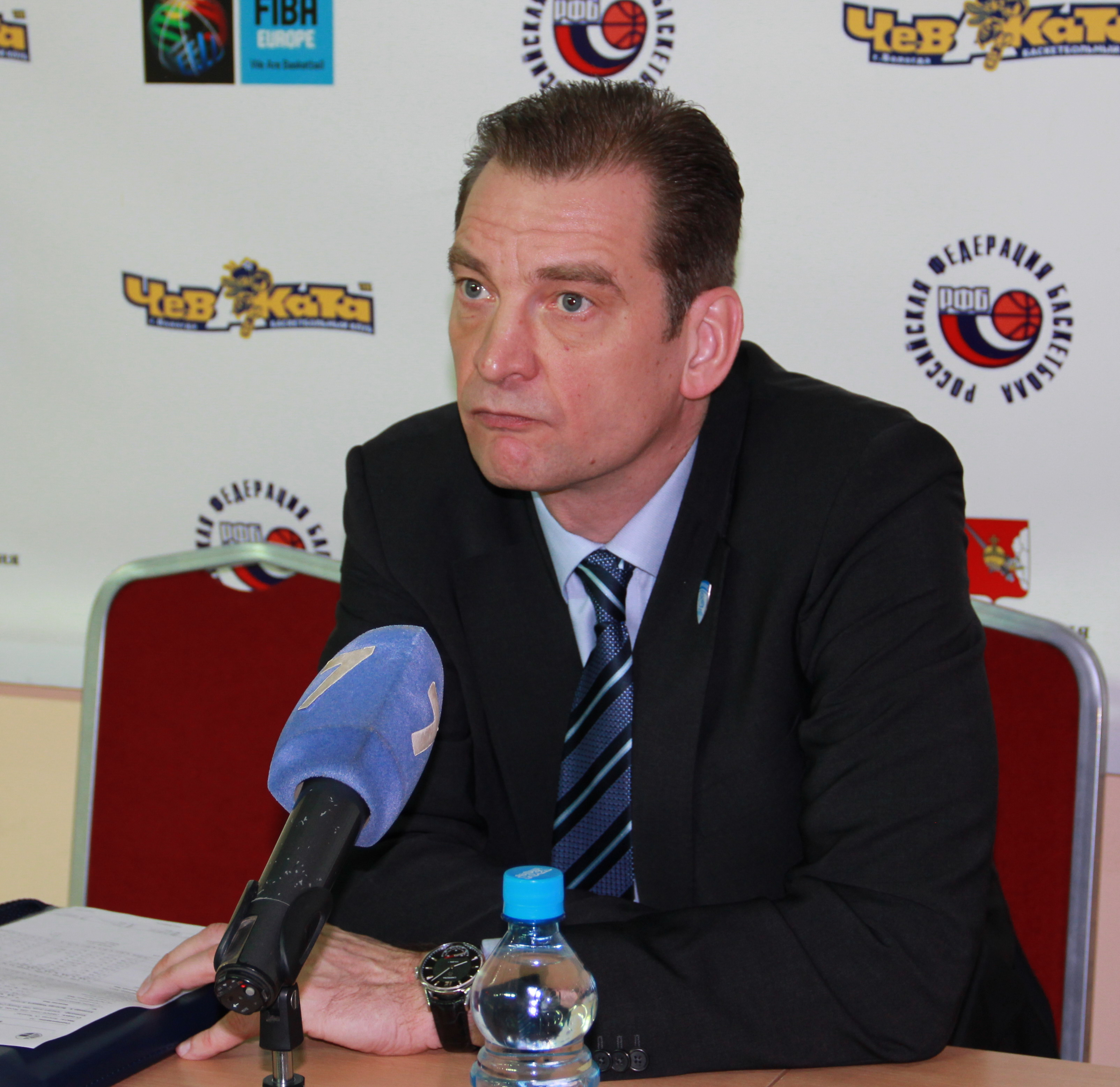

BK Liepāja
- Title: Head coach
- League: LBL; LEBL

Personal information
- Born: 22 May 1967 (age 59) Liepāja, Latvian SSR, Soviet Union
- Listed height: 6 ft 6 in (1.98 m)
- Listed weight: 218 lb (99 kg)

Career information
- NBA draft: 1989: undrafted
- Playing career: 1984–2002
- Position: Shooting guard / small forward
- Number: 2
- Coaching career: 2002–present

Career history

Playing
- 1984–1986: VEF Rīga
- 1986–1987: Rīgas ASK
- 1987–1992: VEF Rīga
- 1992–1993: Minnesota Timberwolves
- 1993–1994: Ādaži Rīga
- 1994–1995: Brocēni Rīga
- 1995–1996: CSKA Moscow
- 1996–1997: Galatasaray
- 1997–2000: CSKA Moscow
- 2000–2002: Fabriano Basket

Coaching
- 2002–2005: Barons
- 2005–2006: Ural Great (assistant)
- 2006–2007: Barons
- 2007–2009: CSKA Moscow (women)
- 2009–2011: UMMC Ekaterinburg (women)
- 2011–2012: Ventspils
- 2012–2013: Spartak Primorye
- 2013–2014: Spartak St. Petersburg
- 2014–2016: Dynamo Kursk (women)
- 2017–2022: Arka Gdynia (women)
- 2021–2023: Latvia (women)
- 2023–2024: Tartu Ülikool
- 2026–present: BK Liepāja

Career highlights
- 4x Russian Superleague champion (1996, 1998–2000); NEBL champion (2000)
- Stats at NBA.com
- Stats at Basketball Reference
Medals
Men's basketball
Representing Soviet Union
World Championships
Silver medal – second place	1990 Argentina	Team
European Championships
Bronze medal – third place	1989 Yugoslavia	Team
European U-18 Championship
Silver medal – second place	1986 Austria	U-18 Team

Gundars Vētra (born 22 May 1967) is a Latvian former professional basketball player and a current coach.

Standing at 6 ft 6 in (1.98 m), he played at the shooting guard and small forward positions. He was the first Latvian to play in the National Basketball Association (NBA). He appeared in 13 games for the Minnesota Timberwolves during the 1992–1993 season.

== Coaching career ==
After finishing his playing career, Vētra became a coach. He first started as head coach of Barons, leading them to their first ever LBL finals appearance in 2005. For the 2005–06 season he was an assistant to Sharon Drucker with Ural Great. Following a season in Russia, Vētra returned to Latvia, where he re-united with Barons. His second stint with Barons wasn't as good as expected, and Vētra left them to try his hand in women's basketball. After four seasons in Russia he went back to Latvia, joining BK Ventspils, where his team made the Latvian League finals.

== Personal life ==
Vētra has two daughters who played NCAA Division I college basketball. Laura played at Fairfield Stags from 2009 to 2013. Ruta was a guard at NJIT Highlanders from 2013 to 2017.

== NBA career statistics ==
Legend
GP	Games played	GS	Games started	MPG	Minutes per game
FG%	Field goal percentage	3P%	3-point field goal percentage	FT%	Free throw percentage
RPG	Rebounds per game	APG	Assists per game	SPG	Steals per game
BPG	Blocks per game	PPG	Points per game	**Bold**	Career high

=== Regular season ===
Year	Team	GP	GS	MPG	FG%	3P%	FT%	RPG	APG	SPG	BPG	PPG
1992–93	Minnesota	13	0	6.8	.475	1.000	.667	.6	.5	.2	.0	3.5
Career		13	0	6.8	.475	1.000	.667	.6	.5	.2	.0	3.5
