= Fedor Dmitriev =

Russian basketball player

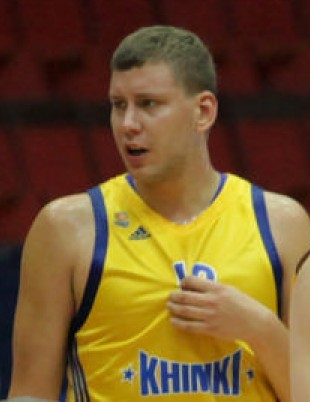
- Dmitriev with Khimki, in 2010.

Personal information
- Born: 19 November 1984 (age 41) Leningrad, Soviet Union
- Listed height: 6 ft 8.75 in (2.05 m)
- Listed weight: 249 lb (113 kg)

Career information
- Playing career: 2002–2017
- Position: Small forward / power forward

Career history
- 2002–2003: Spartak Saint Petersburg
- 2003–2005: Ural Great Perm
- 2005–2007: Spartak Saint Petersburg
- 2007–2009: Triumph Lyubertsy
- 2009–2011: Khimki
- 2011: Krasnye Krylia
- 2011–2012: Asseco Gdynia
- 2012–2013: Spartak Saint Petersburg
- 2013–2014: Asseco Gdynia
- 2014: Koroivos
- 2014–2015: Dzūkija
- 2015–2017: Anwil Włocławek

Career highlights
- Russian Cup winner (2004); Russian League All-Star (2007); Polish League champion (2012); Lithuanian League All-Star (2015)

Fedor Dmitriev (born 19 November 1984) is a Russian former professional basketball player. During his playing career, at a height of 2.05 m (6'8 3/4") tall, he played at the small forward and power forward positions. He was also a member of the senior Russian national team.

== Early years ==
Born in Leningrad, Soviet Union, Dmitriev played basketball with the youth clubs of Pulkovo St. Petersburg. He then played with the club's men's team, from 1999 to 2002.

== Professional career ==
Dmitriev spent most of his pro club career playing with teams in his native Russia. He won the Russian Cup title with Ural Great Perm in 2004. In the 2008–09 season, he averaged 9.3 points and 3.2 rebounds per game for Triumph Lyubertsy. In March 2011, he was sent on a loan from Khimki Moscow Region to Krasnye Krylya, until the end of the season.

While he was a member of Khimki Moscow Region and Asseco Gdynia, he played in Europe's premier basketball competition, the EuroLeague. On 11 November 2014 he signed with Dzūkija of the Latvian League.

== National team career ==
Dmitriev played with the Russian junior national teams between 2002 and 2004, most notably appearing at the 2002 FIBA Europe Under-18 Championship, and the 2004 FIBA Europe Under-20 Championship's qualification phase.

Dmitriev was also a member of the senior Russian national team. He was named to Russia's 2009 EuroBasket team, and he saw action in two games with the team. Although the Russians finished a disappointing seventh in that tournament, they were later awarded a wild card to the 2010 FIBA World Championship.
