= Ivan Dvorny =

Russian basketball player

Personal information
- Born: 5 January 1952 Yasnaya Polyana, Moskalensky District, Omsk Oblast, Russian SFSR, Soviet Union
- Died: 21 September 2015 (aged 63) Omsk, Russia
- Listed height: 6 ft 9 in (2.06 m)
- Listed weight: 231 lb (105 kg)
- Position: Center
Medals
Representing Soviet Union
Men's basketball
Olympic Games
Gold medal – first place	1972 Munich	Team competition

Ivan Vasilyevich Dvorny (Иван Васильевич Дворный; 5 January 1952, Yasnaya Polyana, Moskalensky District, Omsk Oblast – 21 September 2015, Omsk) was a Russian basketball player who won the gold medal with the Soviet national basketball team at the 1972 Summer Olympics. He played for Uralmash in Sverdlovsk, as well as for BC Spartak in Leningrad, BC Spartak Primorye in Vladivostok and Dynamo Moscow.

In 1973, a year after the Olympics, the Soviet national team went on an almost two-month tour of America. Having played more than a dozen matches at various tournaments, the team returned home 50 days later. The players took American consumer goods with them to relatives and for resale. At Sheremetyevo airport, at customs, all these items were confiscated. The Pravda newspaper published an accusatory article about the "struggle for the purity of morals of our Olympic champions". It was decided to arrange a show trial. The choice fell on Ivan Dvorny. The 21-year-old athlete was charged with Article 78 (smuggling – from 5 to 10 years) because a friend from Sverdlovsk helped him sell a pair of jeans and a shirt. There was a "conspiracy" (criminal group), and on 7 June 1973, Dvorny found himself in solitary confinement in the Sverdlovsk pre-trial detention centre. In 1973, he was sentenced to three years to "construction of the national economy" (he served 1,5 years in Omsk) for "speculation" (reselling small quantities of consumer goods). With the assistance of national team head coach Vladimir Kondrashin, he was released early and transferred to the village of Nurma (a pig-feeding plant village near Leningrad). Dvorny was allowed to resume his professional basketball career in 1976, although he would never be called up to the national team again.

Dvorny died on 21 September 2015 in Omsk of lung cancer at the age of 63.
