= Andrew Wisniewski =

American basketball player and coach (born 1981)

Manhattan Jaspers
- Title: Assistant coach
- League: Metro Atlantic Athletic Conference

Personal information
- Born: September 1, 1981 (age 45) Staten Island, New York, U.S.
- Listed height: 6 ft 3 in (1.91 m)
- Listed weight: 190 lb (86 kg)

Career information
- High school: St. Peter's (Staten Island, New York)
- College: St. Peter's (1999–2000); Centenary (2001–2004)
- NBA draft: 2004: undrafted
- Playing career: 2004–2012
- Position: Point guard
- Coaching career: 2016–present

Career history

Playing
- 2004–2005: Crvena zvezda
- 2005–2006: Telekom Baskets Bonn
- 2006: Snaidero Cucine Udine
- 2006–2007: Cibona Zagreb
- 2007–2008: Ural Great Perm
- 2008–2009: Spartak Saint Petersburg
- 2009–2010: Maccabi Tel Aviv
- 2010–2011: Efes Pilsen
- 2012: Spirou Charleroi

Coaching
- 2016–2024: Baruch (assistant)
- 2023–present: Manhattan (assistant)

Career highlights
- Bundesliga Top Scorer (2006); Bundesliga Best Offensive Player (2006); Bundesliga Newcomer of the Year (2006); Bundesliga All-Star (2006); Israeli Cup winner (2010); Israeli Cup Finals MVP (2010); A-1 Liga champion (2007); A-1 Liga Defensive Player of the Year (2007)

Andrew Wisniewski (born September 1, 1981) is an American professional basketball coach and former player. He is currently an assistant coach at Manhattan University.

== College career ==
Wisniewski initially played for the St. Peter's Peacocks for the 1999–00 season, where he played 18 of 28 games while starting 3, and averaged 11 minutes per game. From 2001 to 2004, Wisniewski played in NCAA Division I for Centenary College of Louisiana, where he earned the nickname "Wiz". During his time at Centenary, Wisniewski started and played in a total of 83 games. For his three-year average, he averaged 34 minutes and 21 points per game.

== Professional career ==
Wisniewski went undrafted in the 2004 NBA draft.

For the 2004–05 season he signed with the Serbian club Crvena zvezda. In 23 games of the Adriatic League, he averaged 12 points, 2.4 rebounds and 3.3 assists per game.

For the 2005–06 season he signed with Telekom Baskets Bonn of the German Bundesliga. He was the top scorer of the Bundesliga, with an average of 20.6 points, and was also selected to play at the Bundesliga All-Star Game.

In July 2006, he signed with Snaidero Cucine Udine of the Italian Lega Basket Serie A. He was released in November 2006, after just 9 games. In December 2006, he signed with the Croatian club Cibona Zagreb for the remainder of the season. With Cibona he won the Croatian A-1 Liga.

In July 2007, he signed with PBC Ural Great Perm of Russia for the 2007–08 season. For the 2008–09 season he signed with another Russian club Spartak Saint Petersburg.

In July 2009, he signed a one-year contract with an option for an additional year with the Israeli club Maccabi Tel Aviv. With Maccabi he won the Israeli Cup and was named the MVP of the final game. In July 2010, Maccabi announced that they will not be exercising their option on him for the 2010–11 season.

In June 2010, he signed with the Turkish club Efes Pilsen. After Efes was eliminated from the EuroLeague in February 2011, he was released.

In January 2012, he signed with Spirou Charleroi of Belgium for the rest of the 2011–12 season.

== Coaching career ==
After his playing career concluded, Wisniewski was hired as an assistant coach at Baruch College in 2016.

Wisniewski began working as an assistant coach at Manhattan University in 2023.

== Career statistics ==
=== College statistics ===
Season	GP	MPG	PPG	FG%	3FG%	FT%	APG	RPG	BPG	SPG
1999–00 (SPC)	18	10.9	2.0	27.9	13.3	71.4	1.1	0.9	0.1	0.6
2001–02	28	33.8	19.6	46.7	43.8	76.4	5.7	3.6	0.0	2.1
2002–03	28	33.9	22.0	50.4	36.1	83.3	4.4	2.5	0.1	2.6
2003–04	28	35.0	21.9	51.2	41.8	78.6	4.3	3.5	0.0	1.6

=== European statistics ===
Season	League	Team	GP	MPG	PPG	FG%	3FG%	FT%	APG	RPG	BPG	SPG
2004–05	Adriatic League	Crvena Zvezda	23	27.0	12.0	50.8	31.3	69.8	3.3	2.4	0.1	2.4
2004–05	EuroCup	Red Star	10	30.4	13.9	46.7	31.6	67.5	3.6	1.5	0.3	2.8
2006–07	Adriatic League	Cibona Zagreb	17	27.9	12.4	54.3	42.0	74.3	2.4	2.4	0.1	2.3
2006–07	EuroLeague	Cibona Zagreb	7	28.4	11.9	63.3	50.0	70.6	1.7	1.7	0.0	2.3
2006–07	Italian League	Udine	9	28.8	10.0	34.3	32.1	84.6	3.0	3.0	0.1	2.1
2006–07	EuroCup	Udine	5	25.0	10.8	44.2	41.2	64.3	4.2	1.8	0.0	1.6
2009–10	EuroLeague	Maccabi Electra	20	27.1	8.8	43.1	38.2	72.0	2.6	2.8	0.1	0.9
2010–11	EuroLeague	Efes Pilsen	15	21.6	4.5	42.4	33.3	83.3	1.9	1.2	0.1	0.5
