= Davon Jefferson =

American basketball player (born 1986)

No. 41 – Lobos de Puebla
- Position: Power forward / center
- League: LNBP

Personal information
- Born: November 3, 1986 (age 40) Lynwood, California, U.S.
- Listed height: 6 ft 8 in (2.03 m)
- Listed weight: 225 lb (102 kg)

Career information
- High school: Lynwood (Lynwood, California); The Patterson School (Lenoir, North Carolina)
- College: USC (2007–2008)
- NBA draft: 2008: undrafted
- Playing career: 2008–present

Career history
- 2008–2010: Maccabi Haifa
- 2010–2011: ASVEL Basket
- 2011–2012: Triumph Lyubertsy
- 2012: Guangzhou Whampoa
- 2012–2013: Yenisey Krasnoyarsk
- 2013–2015: Changwon LG Sakers
- 2015: Al Shabab (Dubai)
- 2016: Krasny Oktyabr
- 2016: Capitanes de Arecibo
- 2016: Guaros de Lara
- 2016–2017: Gaziantep Basketbol
- 2017: Bahçeşehir Koleji
- 2018: Capitanes de Arecibo
- 2018: Yeşilgiresun Belediye
- 2018–2019: Pallacanestro Cantù
- 2019–2020: Virtus Roma
- 2020: Maccabi Haifa
- 2020–2021: BC Budivelnyk
- 2021–2022: Indios de Mayagüez
- 2022–2023: Real Estelí
- 2023–2024: Osos de Manatí
- 2024: Halcones de Xalapa
- 2024–2025: Halcones Rojos Veracruz
- 2025: Atléticos de San Germán
- 2025–2026: Real Estelí
- 2026: Indios de Mayagüez
- 2026: Cangrejeros de Santurce
- 2026–present: Lobos de Puebla

Career highlights
- FIBA Intercontinental Cup champion (2016); 2× Puerto Rican League champion (2016, 2018); Korean League Player of the Year (2014); All-Korean League First Team (2014); Russian PBL MVP (2012); Russian PBL All-Symbolic First Team (2012); Israeli Super League Sixth Man of the Year (2009); Turkish Super League All-Star (2017)

Davon Jefferson (born November 3, 1986) is an American professional basketball player who last played for the Cangrejeros de Santurce of the Baloncesto Superior Nacional (BSN). He attended and played college basketball for the USC Trojans.

== High school ==
Jefferson attended Lynwood High School in Lynwood, California. He then attended The Patterson School in Lenoir, North Carolina in 2006, before attending the University of Southern California (USC).

== College ==
He played collegiately with the University of Southern California (USC). Jefferson was all Pac-10 honorable mention and first team all-freshman.

== Professional career ==
Jefferson entered the 2008 NBA draft and hired an agent, thereby ending his college eligibility. However, he was not drafted. After being undrafted he signed his first professional contract with Maccabi Haifa of the Israeli League. The 2010–11 season he spent playing in France with ASVEL Basket. In July 2011 he signed a one-year contract with Triumph Lyubertsy in Russia. He was named Russian PBL MVP for the 2011–12 season. In November 2012, he signed a one-year contract with Yenisey Krasnoyarsk in Russia.

For the 2013–14 season he signed with Changwon LG Sakers of South Korea. In June 2014, he re-signed with them for one more season. In March 2015, Jefferson was kicked out of the team for unprofessional conduct and stretching during the national anthem. In August 2015, he signed with Al Shabab Dubai.

On December 30, 2015, he signed with the Russian club Krasny Oktyabr. On May 11, 2016, he signed with the Capitanes de Arecibo of Puerto Rico for the rest of the 2016 BSN season.

On August 17, 2016, Jefferson signed with the Venezuelan club Guaros de Lara. With them he won the 2016 FIBA Intercontinental Cup. On November 8, 2016, he signed with Turkish club Gaziantep Basketbol.

On July 2, 2017, Jefferson signed with Turkish club Bahçeşehir Koleji. He left Bahçeşehir after appearing in five games. On January 18, 2018, he signed with Yeşilgiresun Belediye for the rest of the 2017–18 BSL season.

On October 2, 2018, Jefferson signed a deal with Italian club Pallacanestro Cantù.

On July 29, 2019, he signed with Virtus Roma of the Italian Lega Basket Serie A (LBA).

On November 3, 2020, he signed with Maccabi Haifa.

On June 20, 2021, Jefferson returned to Capitanes de Arecibo.

On April 2, 2026, he debuted for the Indios de Mayagüez scoring 24 points and grabbing 10 rebounds. On April 13, 2026, he was traded to the Cangrejeros de Santurce in exchange for Demarcus Cousins.
