= Nikola Jestratijević =

Serbian basketball player

Personal information
- Born: July 9, 1976 (age 50) Zemun, SR Serbia, SFR Yugoslavia
- Listed height: 6 ft 11 in (2.11 m)
- Listed weight: 234 lb (106 kg)

Career information
- NBA draft: 1998: undrafted
- Playing career: 1994–2007
- Position: Center
- Number: 9, 12, 19

Career history
- 1994–1996: Crvena zvezda
- 1996–1998: FMP Železnik
- 1998–2000: Crvena zvezda
- 2000–2001: Kinder Bologna
- 2001–2002: Budućnost
- 2002–2003: AEK Athens
- 2003: ASVEL
- 2004: Paris Racing
- 2004: Crvena zvezda
- 2005–2006: Spartak Primorye
- 2006–2007: Śląsk Wrocław
Medals
Men's basketball
Representing FR Yugoslavia
'22 & under' European Championship
Bronze medal – third place	1996 Turkey	Team

Nikola Jestratijević (Serbian Cyrillic: Никола Јестратијевић; born July 9, 1976) is a retired Serbian professional basketball player.

== Playing career ==
Jestratijević played for Crvena zvezda, FMP Železnik, Kinder Bologna, Budućnost, AEK Athens, ASVEL, Paris Racing, Spartak Primorye, and Śląsk Wrocław.

== National team career ==
In July 1996, Jestratijević was member of the Yugoslavian U-22 national team that won a bronze medal at the European Championship for Men 22 and Under in Sydney, Australia. In one tournament game, he recorded one rebound.

In September 2000, Jestratijević was member of the Yugoslavian national team at the 2000 Olympic Basketball Tournament in Sydney, Australia. Over four tournament games, he averaged 1.8 points and 1.2 rebounds per game.

== Career achievements ==
- Euroleague champion: 1 (with Kinder Bologna: 2000–01)
- Italian League champion: 1 (with Kinder Bologna: 2000–01)
- Italian Cup winner: 1 (with Kinder Bologna: 2000–01)
- Yugoslav Cup winner: 1 (with FMP Železnik: 1996–97)

== See also ==
- List of KK Crvena zvezda players with 100 games played
