= Aleksandr Dedushkin =

Russian basketball player

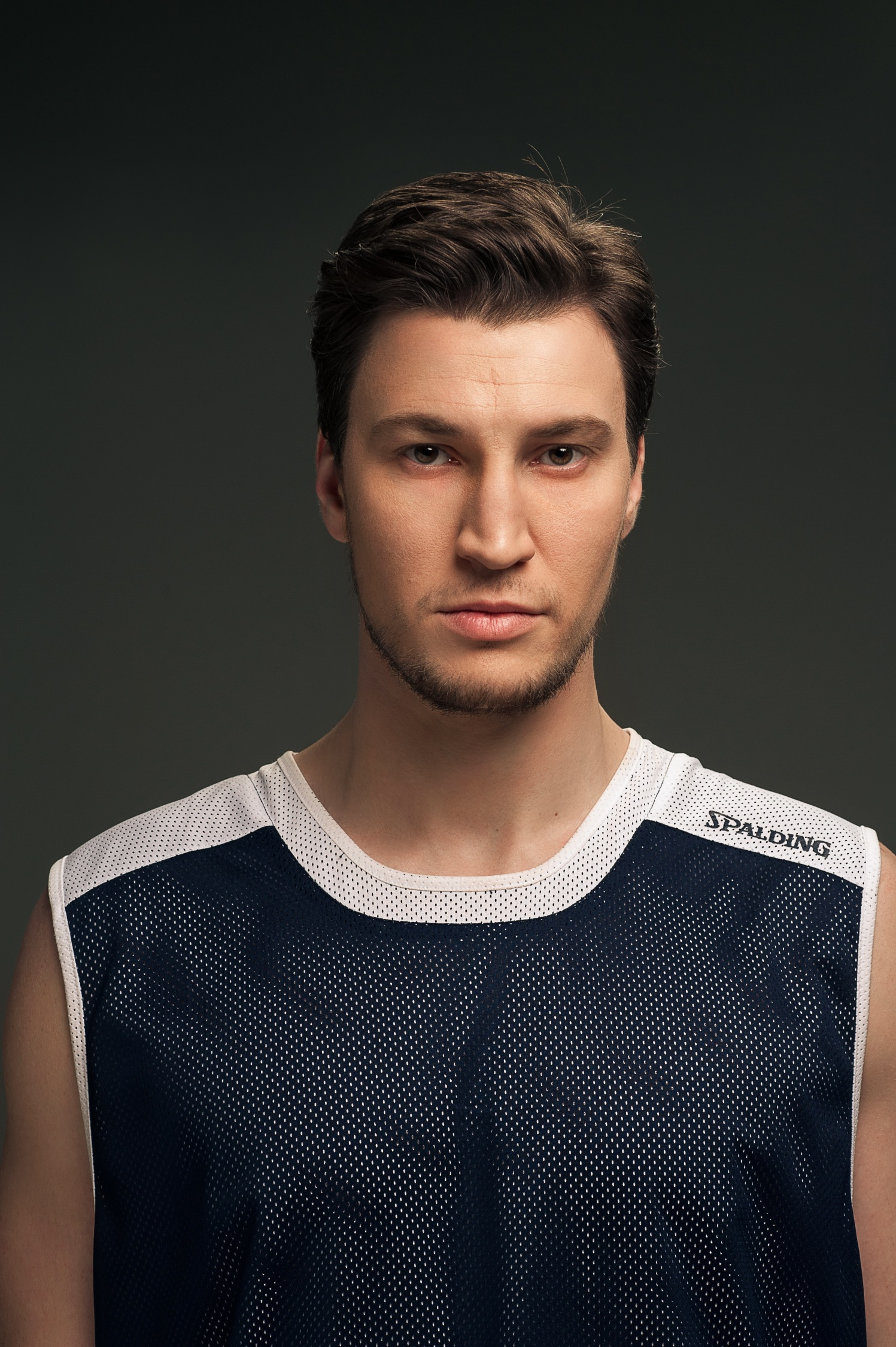
Alexander Dedushkin, Russian professional basketball players

Aleksandr Dedushkin (born 1981 in Ulyanovsk, Russia) is a Russian professional basketball player. He is a center. He is 2.07 m (6 ft 9 ½ in) in height and 120 kg (265 pounds) in weight.

== Professional career ==
He has played with the pro clubs Khimki BC, Spartak Saint Petersburg, Ural Great, Proteas EKA AEL and BC Krasnye Krylia.
