= Joseph Blair =

American basketball player and coach

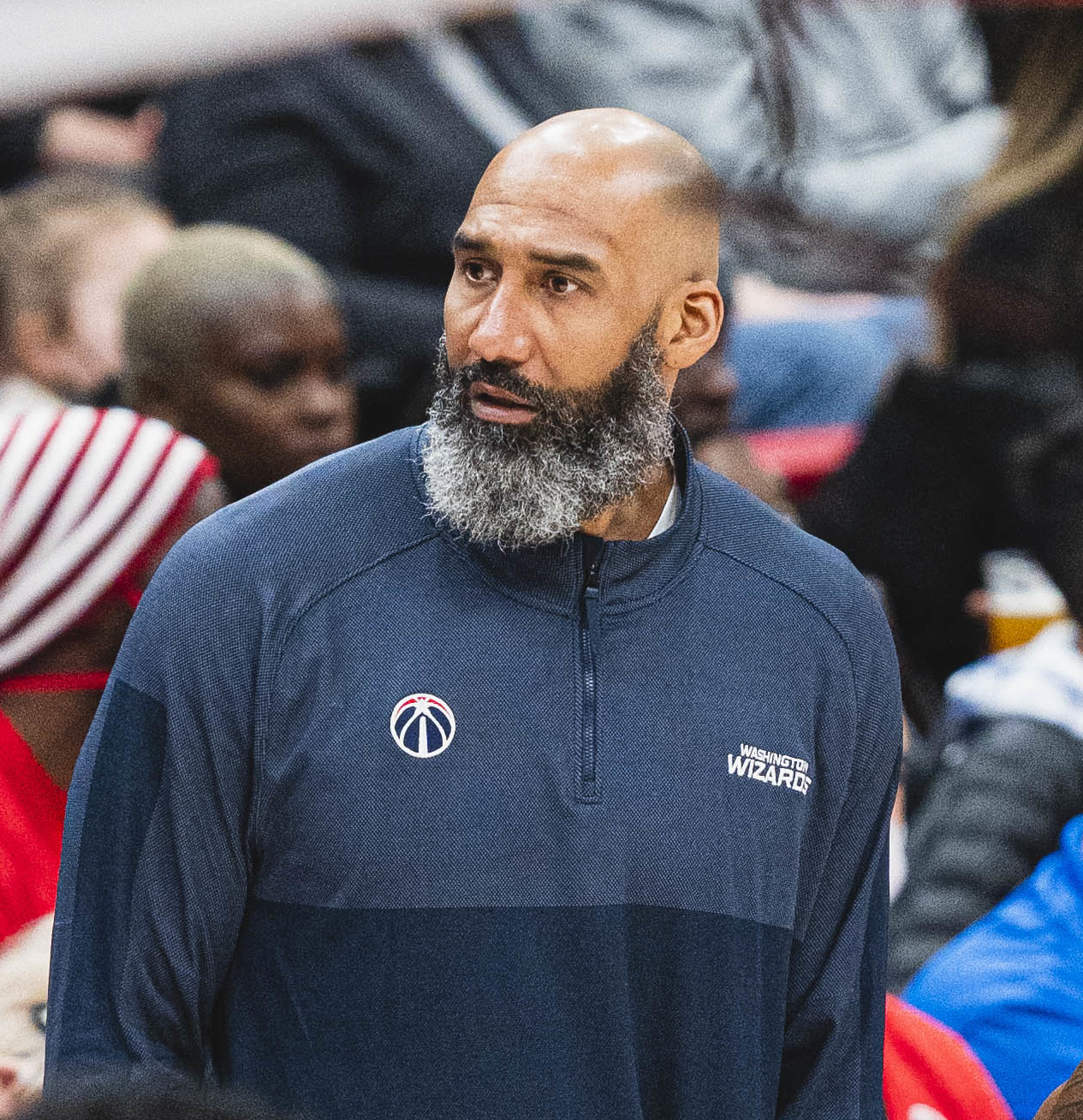
- Blair with the Washington Wizards in 2022

Rio Grande Valley Vipers
- Title: Head coach
- League: NBA G League

Personal information
- Born: June 12, 1974 (age 52) Akron, Ohio, U.S.
- Listed height: 6 ft 10.75 in (2.10 m)
- Listed weight: 265 lb (120 kg)

Career information
- High school: C.E. King (Houston, Texas)
- College: Arizona (1992–1996)
- NBA draft: 1996: 2nd round, 35th overall pick
- Drafted by: Seattle SuperSonics
- Playing career: 1996–2009
- Position: Power forward / center
- Coaching career: 2015–present

Career history

Playing
- 1996: Pau-Orthez
- 1997–1998: Harlem Globetrotters
- 1998: Long Island Surf
- 1998–1999: Fila Biella
- 1999–2000: Scavolini Pesaro
- 2000–2001: PAOK
- 2001: Harlem Globetrotters
- 2001–2002: Scavolini Pesaro
- 2002–2004: Ülkerspor
- 2004–2007: Armani Jeans Milano
- 2007–2008: Spartak Primorje
- 2008–2009: Spartak Saint Petersburg

Coaching
- 2013–2015: Arizona (graduate assistant)
- 2015–2018: Rio Grande Valley Vipers (assistant)
- 2018–2019: Rio Grande Valley Vipers
- 2019–2020: Philadelphia 76ers (assistant)
- 2020–2021: Minnesota Timberwolves (assistant)
- 2021–2024: Washington Wizards (assistant)
- 2024–present: Rio Grande Valley Vipers
- 2025: NBA G League United

Career highlights
- As player: EuroLeague Regular Season MVP (2003); All-EuroLeague Second Team (2002); 2× Turkish Cup winner (2003, 2004); 2× Turkish SuperCup winner (2002, 2003); As coach: NBA G League champion (2019)
- Stats at Basketball Reference

Joseph Blair (born June 12, 1974) is an American former professional basketball player who is currently the head coach of the Rio Grande Valley Vipers of the NBA G League. Standing 2.10m (6 ft 10.75 in) tall, and weighing 120 kg (265 pounds), he spent his playing career playing at the positions of power forward and center. He was reputed for his spectacular playing style, most notably while he was a member of the Harlem Globetrotters.

== High school ==
Blair attended school and played basketball at C.E. King High School, in Houston, Texas.

== College career ==
Blair played four seasons of college basketball with the Arizona Wildcats of the Pacific-10 Conference in the NCAA Division I. He averaged 10.4 points and 6.5 rebounds per game during his collegiate career, and he was a member of Arizona's two regular season Pac-10 championships, in 1993 and 1994. He was a starter on the Arizona squad that advanced to the 1994 NCAA Final Four.

As of the 2014–15 season, he held the Arizona program's record for highest career field goal percentage (61.3%), and also ranked eighth on the school's all-time shot blocking records list, with 101 blocks.

== Professional career ==
Though he was drafted 35th overall in the 1996 NBA draft, by the Seattle SuperSonics, Blair didn't sign with the team, and his agent engineered his release. Later in his career, a preseason game with the Chicago Bulls in 2007, was the closest he came to playing in the NBA, before being waived by the Bulls in October, less than two weeks after being signed.

After being released by Seattle, he moved to Europe, signing in France with Pau-Orthez for the first part of the 1996–97 season.

After a return to the U.S., to play for the Harlem Globetrotters and the Long Island Surf, the latter of the United States Basketball League (USBL), Blair returned to Europe in 1998.

He moved to the Italian LBA league, in which he would spend a good part of his career, with Biella, Scavolini Pesaro, and Armani Jeans Milano, participating in the league's All-Star Game in 2000, 2005, and 2006, and leading the league in rebounds in the 1999–00 season.

He had an interlude with PAOK of the Greek Basket League in the 2000–01 season, which he described as a "bad experience", due to salary arrears. He did not finish that season in Greece, and instead finished it playing with the Harlem Globetrotters again.

Whilst playing with the Italian club Pesaro in the EuroLeague, Europe's premier club competition, he was selected to the 2001–02 All-EuroLeague Second Team.

Blair played for Ülkerspor for two years, in the Turkish Basketball Super League and the EuroLeague. He was named the 2002–03 season EuroLeague Regular Season MVP, whilst playing for the club.

He finished his career in the Russian Basketball Super League 1, playing first with Spartak Primorje, with whom he led the league in rebounding, during the 2007–08 season, and then with another Russian team, Spartak Saint Petersburg.

== Coaching career ==
Blair returned to the Arizona Wildcats college program for the 2013–14 season, serving as an undergraduate assistant coach, and helping the team's big men. For the 2014–15 season, he was moved to the school's graduate manager position, and in these roles he was credited with helping Arizona players like Kaleb Tarczewski and Brandon Ashley realize their potential. He was not offered a position at the University of Arizona for the 2015–16 season.

On October 14, 2015, Blair was hired by the NBA D-League's Rio Grande Valley Vipers, as an assistant coach. On October 10, 2018, Blair was named the new head coach of the NBA D-League's Rio Grande Valley Vipers. On June 26, 2019, Blair was hired as an assistant coach of the Philadelphia 76ers. On October 15, 2020, Blair left the 76ers for the Minnesota Timberwolves.

He joined the Washington Wizards for the 2021–22 season.

In lieu of the absence of Wizards Head Coach Wes Unseld Jr., Blair won his first game as a head coach on January 17, 2022, beating the Philadelphia 76ers 117–98.

On August 26, 2024, Blair was named head coach of the Rio Grande Valley Vipers.

== Personal life ==
After being inspired by the youth camps run by the Harlem Globetrotters, in which he previously participated, Blair founded the Blair Charity Group. Described as, "a local charity group that focuses on Tucson’s youth", the group provides free-of-charge "leadership and social-skill based basketball camps and clinics" around the Tucson area. Though basketball is at the center of the charity, it also aims to provide education and social skills to children. The charity remains fee less, as to not deprive unprivileged children of an opportunity.

Two of Blair's three children were born in Italy, both with a former Italian girlfriend. After playing in three different cities in the country, he also speaks fluent Italian.

Since finishing his playing career in 2009, Blair has lived in Tucson, Arizona, where the University of Arizona is located. He returned to the university to finish his degree, which he obtained in 2014.
