= Nikolay Padius =

Russian basketball player

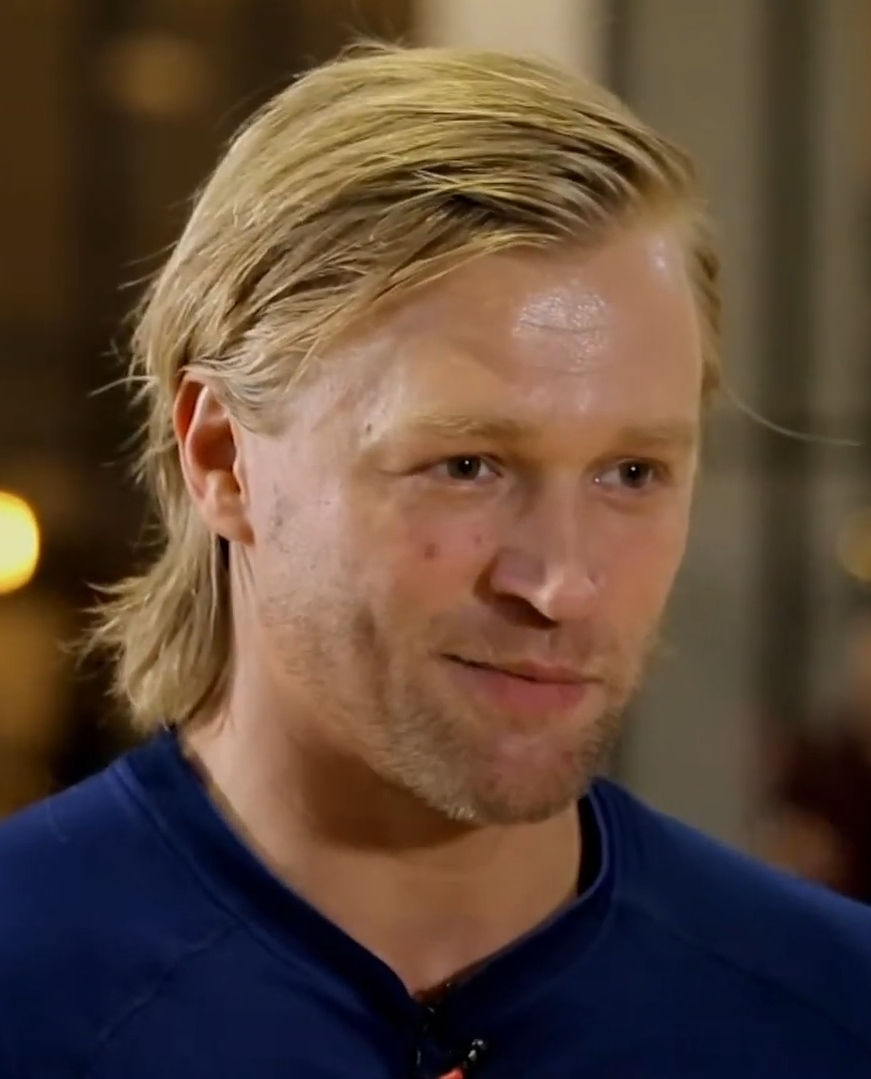

Personal information
- Born: 9 January 1980 (age 46) Saint Petersburg, SFSR, Soviet Union
- Listed height: 1.97 m (6 ft 6 in)
- Listed weight: 205 lb (93 kg)

Career information
- NBA draft: 2002: undrafted
- Playing career: 1997–2012
- Position: Shooting guard

Career history
- 1997–2000: Spartak St. Petersburg
- 2000–2003: CSKA Moscow
- 2003–2004: Dynamo Moscow
- 2004–2006: Aris Thessaloniki
- 2006–2007: Dynamo Moscow Region
- 2007–2008: UNICS Kazan
- 2008: Maroussi
- 2008–2010: Spartak Primorje
- 2010–2011: UNICS Kazan
- 2011–2012: Lokomotiv Kuban
- 2012: Spartak Primorje

Career highlights
- FIBA EuroCup All-Star (2007); Greek League All-Star (2006); Russian League champion (2003); Russian League All-Star (2007)
Medals
Men's basketball
Representing Russia
FIBA EuroBasket
Gold medal – first place	2007 Spain

Nikolay Padius (alternate spelling: Nikolai; born January 9, 1980, in Saint Petersburg, SFSR, Soviet Union) is a Russian former professional basketball player. At a height of 1.97 m (6 ft 5 3/4 in) tall, and a weight of 93 kg (205 pounds), he played at the shooting guard position.

== Professional career ==
Padius played professionally with the following clubs: Spartak St. Petersburg, CSKA Moscow, Dynamo Moscow, Aris Thessaloniki, Dynamo Moscow Region, UNICS Kazan, Spartak Primorje, and Lokomotiv Kuban.

== National team career ==
Padius was a member of the junior national teams of Russia. With Russia's junior national teams, he played at the 1998 FIBA Europe Under-18 Championship, the 1999 FIBA Under-19 World Cup, the 2000 FIBA Europe Under-20 Championship, and the 2001 World University Games.

He was also a member of the senior Russian national basketball team. With Russia's senior team, he played at the 2007 EuroBasket, where he won a gold medal.

== Awards and accomplishments ==
=== Club honors ===
- EuroCup:
  - Runner-up (1): 2005–06
- Russian League:
  - Champion (1): 2002–03
  - Third place (2): 2003–04, 2010–11
- Russian Cup:
  - Runner-up (1): 2003
- Greek League
  - Third place (1): 2005–06
- Greek Cup:
  - Runner-up (1): 2005

=== Individual ===
- Greek League All-Star: (2006)
- Russian League All-Star: (2007)
- FIBA EuroCup All-Star: (2007)
