= Universal Sports Palace Molot =

Indoor sports arena in Perm, Russia

Molot Sports Hall
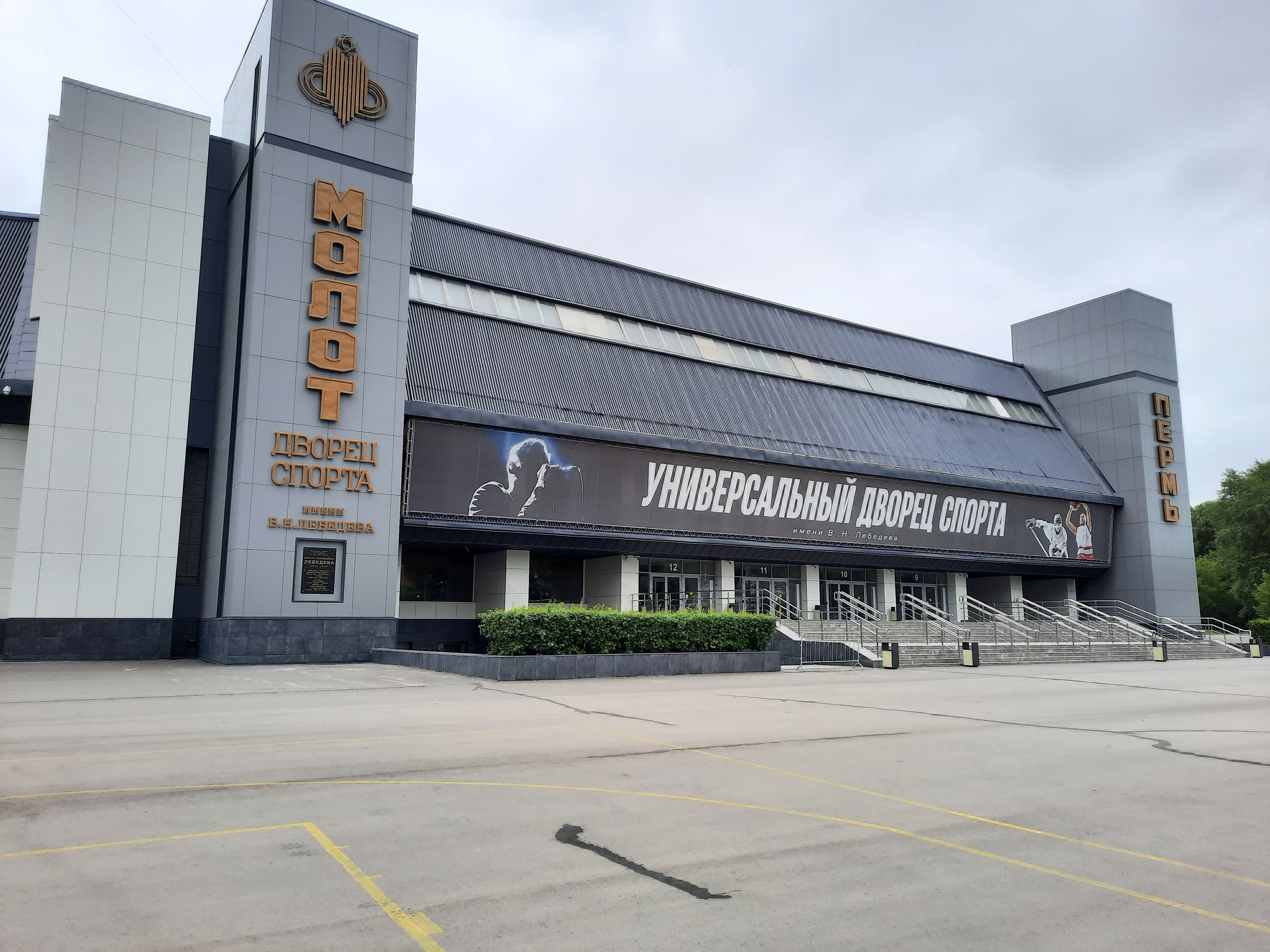
- Interactive map of Molot Sports Hall
- Full name: Universal Sports Palace Molot
- Location: Perm, Perm Krai, Russia
- Coordinates: 58°01′26″N 56°17′45″E
- Capacity: Basketball: 6,923; Ice Hockey: 5,787
- Surface: Parquet

Construction
- Opened: 1966
- Renovated: 1989

Tenants
- Molot-Prikamye Perm; Ural Great; Parma Basket

Universal Sports Palace Molot (Russian: Универсальный Дворец спорта Молот) is an indoor sporting arena that is located in Perm, Russia. It has a seating capacity of 7,000 spectators for basketball, and 6,000 spectators for ice hockey.

== History ==
Universal Sports Palace Molot was originally built in 1966, and it was reconstructed in 1989. It is the home arena of the Molot-Prikamye Perm ice hockey team, and was also the home of the Ural Great basketball team. Parma Basket basketball team also uses the arena.

Sports Palace Molot was declared bankrupt in 2018.
