= MTL Arena =

Indoor sports arena in Samara, Russia

MTL Arena is an indoor sporting arena that is located in Samara, Russia. The seating capacity of the arena is 1,405. It is the home arena of the Dinamo-Samara, Russian professional futsal club.
