= Triumph Sports Palace =

Basketball arena in Lyubertsy, Russia

Coordinates: 55°40′30″N 37°53′31″E

- SH Triumph
- Interactive map of Triumph Sports Palace
- Location: 4 Smirnovskaya St., 140 000 Lyubertsy, Moscow Region, Russia
- Capacity: Basketball: 4,000
- Surface: Parquet

Tenant
- Triumph Lyubertsy

Triumph Sports Palace is an indoor arena that is located in Lyubertsy, Russia. The arena is primarily used to host basketball games. The seating capacity of the arena for basketball games is 4,000.

== History ==
Triumph Sports Palace was used as the home arena of the Russian professional basketball team, Triumph Lyubertsy (now known as Zenit Saint Petersburg), when the club was based in Lyubertsy, Russia.
