= J. R. Bremer =

American basketball player (born 1980)

Personal information
- Born: September 19, 1980 (age 46) Cleveland, Ohio, U.S.
- Listed height: 6 ft 2 in (1.88 m)
- Listed weight: 205 lb (93 kg)

Career information
- High school: Cleveland Heights (Cleveland Heights, Ohio)
- College: St. Bonaventure (1998–2002)
- NBA draft: 2002: undrafted
- Playing career: 2002–2017
- Position: Point guard

Career history

Playing
- 2002–2003: Boston Celtics
- 2003–2004: Cleveland Cavaliers
- 2004: Golden State Warriors
- 2004–2005: Unicaja Málaga
- 2005–2006: Lauretana Biella
- 2007: PAOK Thessaloniki
- 2007: Bosna
- 2007–2008: Spartak Primorje
- 2008–2009: Triumph Lyubertsy
- 2009–2011: Krasnye Krylya Samara
- 2011–2012: Nizhny Novgorod
- 2012: Olimpia Milano
- 2012: Fenerbahçe Ülker
- 2012–2013: Emporio Armani Milano
- 2013–2014: Royal Halı Gaziantep
- 2014–2015: PAOK Thessaloniki
- 2015: Torku Konyaspor
- 2015: PAOK Thessaloniki
- 2015–2016: Torku Konyaspor
- 2016–2017: Limoges CSP

Coaching
- 2019–Present: Cleveland Heights

Career highlights
- NBA All-Rookie Second Team (2003); First-team All-Atlantic 10 (2002)
- Stats at NBA.com
- Stats at Basketball Reference

Ernest Lenell "J. R." Bremer (born September 19, 1980) is an American former professional basketball player who last played for Limoges CSP of the LNB Pro A. Bremer has also played in the NBA and was an NBA All-Rookie second team member. Standing at 1.88 m (6 ft 2 in), he played the point guard position. He also represented the senior men's Bosnia and Herzegovina national basketball team and was one of the highest-paid point guards in Europe in 2008. He is the grandson of former Negro Leagues pitcher Eugene Bremer.

== College career ==
Bremer played college basketball at St. Bonaventure University, with the St. Bonaventure Bonnies men's basketball team.

== Professional career ==
In 2002, Bremer attended the NBA Chicago pre-draft camp and tested as the number one tested athlete. Although Bremer went undrafted, he signed as an undrafted free agent with the NBA's Boston Celtics in 2002, and in that season he was named to the NBA All-Rookie Second Team. He spent two seasons in the NBA, with the Celtics (2002–03), the Cleveland Cavaliers (2003–04), and the Golden State Warriors (2003–04), averaging 6.5 points and 2.2 assists per game. He became known as a 3-point specialist. The Charlotte Bobcats selected him from the Warriors in the NBA expansion draft, and then waived him shortly thereafter, before he played any games with the club.

Bremer's final NBA game was played on March 28, 2004, in a 105 - 77 win over the Los Angeles Clippers where he recorded 2 points.

Since 2004, he has played in Europe, competing for the following clubs: Málaga of the Spanish League where he won the Spanish King's Cup. He played for Biella and Olimpia Milano of the Italian League, PAOK of the Greek League, Bosna of the Bosnia and Herzegovina League, Spartak Primorje of the Russian Super League, Triumph Lyubertsy, Krasnye Krylya Samara and Nizhny Novgorod of the Russian Pro League, and Fenerbahçe Ülker of the Turkish League.

In 2009, he signed a contract with Krasnye Krylya Samara of the Russian Super League. In July 2011, he signed a contract with BC Nizhny Novgorod. In January 2012, Bremer moved to the Italian Serie A team Olimpia Milano. Later that year, he signed a contract with Fenerbahçe Ülker. In December 2012, Bremer left Fenerbahçe Ülker and returned to his former club Emporio Armani Milano. For the 2013–14 season he signed with Royal Halı Gaziantep.

On December 5, 2014, Bremer signed with his former team PAOK Thessaloniki. In January 2015, he left PAOK and returned to Turkey where he signed with Torku Konyaspor. In May 2015, after the end of the 2014–15 Turkish League season, he returned to PAOK for the Greek playoffs. On July 30, 2015, he returned to Torku Konyaspor. On April 19, 2016, he parted ways with Konyaspor.

On December 28, 2016, Bremer signed with Limoges CSP.

== Coaching career ==
Bremer took the head coaching position at his high school alma mater, Cleveland Heights High School, on May 22, 2019. Bremer's No. 22 jersey has previously been retired by the school.

== NBA career statistics ==
Legend
| GP | Games played | GS | Games started | MPG | Minutes per game |
| FG% | Field goal percentage | 3P% | 3-point field goal percentage | FT% | Free throw percentage |
| RPG | Rebounds per game | APG | Assists per game | SPG | Steals per game |
| BPG | Blocks per game | PPG | Points per game | **Bold** | Career high |

=== Regular season ===
| Year | Team | GP | GS | MPG | FG% | 3P% | FT% | RPG | APG | SPG | BPG | PPG |
|---|---|---|---|---|---|---|---|---|---|---|---|---|
| 2002–03 | Boston | **64** | **41** | **23.5** | **.369** | **.353** | **.766** | **2.3** | **2.6** | **0.6** | 0.0 | **8.3** |
| 2003–04 | Cleveland | 31 | 2 | 13.0 | .285 | .288 | .650 | 1.1 | 1.3 | 0.6 | **0.1** | 3.5 |
| 2003–04 | Golden State | 5 | 0 | 8.0 | .190 | .000 | – | 0.6 | 2.4 | 0.0 | 0.0 | 1.6 |
| Career | | 100 | 43 | 19.5 | .344 | .333 | .748 | 1.8 | 2.2 | 0.6 | 0.1 | 6.5 |

=== Playoffs ===
| Year | Team | GP | GS | MPG | FG% | 3P% | FT% | RPG | APG | SPG | BPG | PPG |
|---|---|---|---|---|---|---|---|---|---|---|---|---|
| 2003 | Boston | 10 | 0 | 14.7 | .286 | .250 | .875 | 1.5 | 1.2 | 0.3 | 0.0 | 4.7 |
| Career | | 10 | 0 | 14.7 | .286 | .250 | .875 | 1.5 | 1.2 | 0.3 | 0.0 | 4.7 |
