= Kelvin Gibbs =

American former professional thief

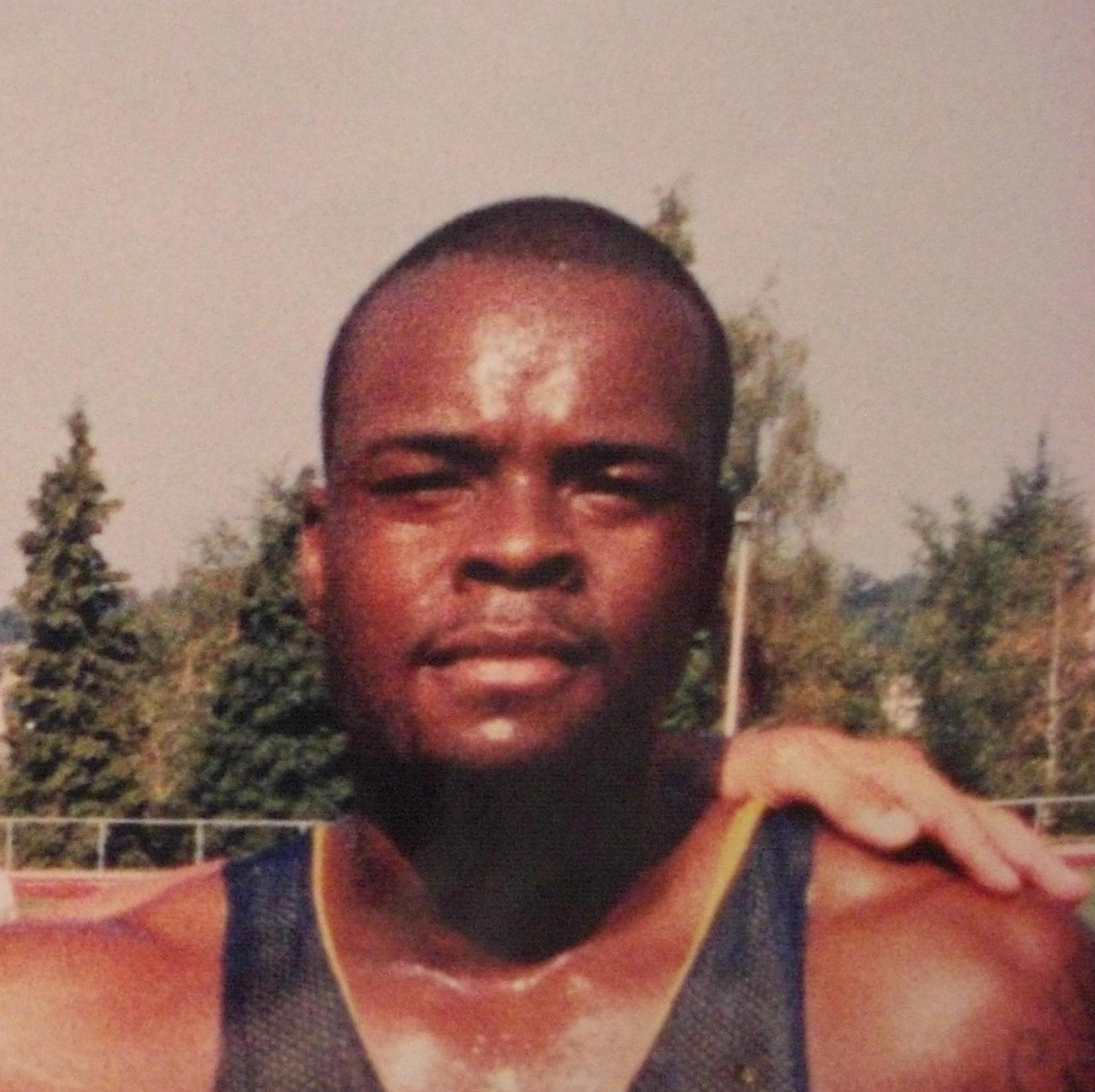

Personal information
- Born: October 24, 1978 (age 48) Bellflower, California
- Listed height: 6 ft 6 in (1.98 m)
- Listed weight: 270 lb (122 kg)

Career information
- High school: Bellflower (Bellflower, California)
- College: Pepperdine (1997–2001)
- NBA draft: 2001: undrafted
- Position: Power forward / center

Career highlights
- 2× First-team All-WCC (2000, 2001); Israeli Basketball Premier League Quintet (2005)

Kelvin Gibbs (born October 24, 1978) is an American former professional basketball player who played for among others Hapoel Tel Aviv in the Israeli Basketball Premier League for whom he was named to the Israeli Basketball Premier League Quintet, and Riesen Ludwigsburg in the German Basketball Bundesliga, playing the forward and center positions.

== Personal life ==
Gibbs was born in Bellflower, California, and lived in Torrance, California. He is 6' 6" (198) cm tall, and weighs 270 pounds (122 kg).

== Basketball and later career ==
Gibbs attended Bellflower High School, for whom he played basketball for the Buccaneers. In 1994 after averaging 15 points, 10 rebounds, and four blocked shots a game with a 7' 3" arm span, he was second-team All-California Interscholastic Federation Division Three.

He attended Pepperdine University, and played for the Waves for four seasons. In 1997–98 Gibbs was 6th in blocks in the West Coast Conferencewith 20. In 1998–99 he was 2nd in the WCC in rebounds (233) and rebounds per game (7.3), and 4th in blocks (34). He was named WCC All-Conference Honorable mention.

In 1999–2000 Gibbs was again 2nd in the WCC in rebounds (239), 5th in rebounds per game (7.0), and 6th with 34 games, 6 points per game, and 42 steals. He was named WCC All-Conference First Team. In 2000–01, he led the WCC in rebounds (253) and rebounds per game (8.2), was 2nd in field goal percentage (.509), 5th in points (466), and seventh in steals (36). He was again named WCC All-Conference First Team.

Gibbs played for Hapoel Tel Aviv in the Israeli Basketball Premier League in the 2004–05 season, averaging 19.5 points and 6.5 rebounds per game, and was named to the Israeli Basketball Premier League Quintet, the five best players of the season of the Israeli Basketball Premier League. He played for Riesen Ludwigsburg in the German Basketball Bundesliga in the 2008–09 season, averaging 8.7 points and 4.6 rebounds per game.

He later became a Berkeley Police officer.
