= Sibirtelecom Lokomotiv Novosibirsk =

Russian professional basketball club

Lokomotiv Novosibirsk, commonly known as Sibirtelecom Lokomotiv (Russian: Сибирьтелеком-Локомотив) for sponsorships reasons, was a Russian professional basketball club that was based in Novosibirsk, Russia. Founded 1973, the team competed in the Russian Superleague B. In 2011, Lokomotiv was dissolved.
