= BC Spartak Primorye =

Spartak Primorye
- Leagues: Russian Super League
- Founded: 1999; 27 years ago
- Folded: 2020; 6 years ago
- Arena: SK Olimpiets
- Capacity: 1,026
- Location: Vladivostok, Russia
- Team colors: Red and White
- President: Sergey Nasonov
- Website: www.spartakbasket.ru
Home	Away

BC Spartak Primorye (Russian: БК «Спартак-Приморье») was a Russian professional basketball club based in Vladivostok, Russia. They played in the Russian Super League 1 before the COVID-19 pandemic in Russia forced them to withdraw. They have not returned since.

== Notable players ==
Note: Flags indicate national team eligibility at FIBA-sanctioned events. Players may hold other non-FIBA nationalities not displayed.

Criteria

To appear in this section a player must have either:

- Set a club record or won an individual award while at the club
- Played at least one official international match for their national team at any time
- Played at least one official NBA match at any time.

- (Russia) Victor Keyru: (2006–07)
- (Russia) Nikolay Padius: (2008–09, 2012–13)
- (Lithuania) Tomas Nagys: (2005–06)
- (Lithuania) Vidas Ginevičius: (2007–09)
- (Serbia) Nikola Jestratijević: (2005–06)
- (United States) Torraye Braggs: (2005–06)
- (United States) / (Bulgaria) Willie Deane: (2005–07)
- (United States) Derrick Phelps: (2006–07)
- (United States) / (Bosnia and Herzegovina) J. R. Bremer: (2007–08)
- (United States) Joseph Blair: (2007–08)

== Honours ==
- Russian Basketball Super League 1
  - Winners (3): 2004-05, 2010–11, 2017–18

== European record ==
Season	Competition	Round	Club	Home	Away	Agg
2011–12	FIBA EuroChallenge	Qualifying round	(Russia) Enisey	75–58	66–89	141–147

Notes

1. Spartak points are listed first.
