= BC Spartak Saint Petersburg =

- Nickname: Red-White
- Leagues: Russian Super League 1
- Founded: 1935
- Dissolved: 2020
- History: BC Spartak Leningrad (1935–1991); BC Spartak Saint Petersburg (1991–2014); BC Kondrashin Belov (BCKB) (2016–2017); BC Spartak Saint Petersburg (2017–2020)
- Arena: Nova Arena
- Capacity: 1,200
- Location: Saint Petersburg, Russia
- Team colors: Red and white
- Main sponsor: VTB
- President: Alexey Fetisov
- Head coach: Zakhar Pashutin
- Team captain: Oleg Bartunov
- Championships: 2 FIBA Saporta Cups; 2 Soviet Championships; 2 Soviet Cups; 1 Russian Cup
- Website: bc-spartak.ru
| Home | Away |

BC Spartak Saint Petersburg was a Russian professional basketball team that is based in Saint Petersburg, Russia. During the 2016–17 season, the club was named BC Kondrashin Belov (BCKB), after its former player Alexander Belov and its former head coach Vladimir Kondrashin.

== History ==
The club was originally established on September 8, 1935, as BC Spartak Leningrad. The club then became known as BC Spartak Saint Petersburg in 1991.

The club was disbanded on July 31, 2014, due to financial problems. However, it was later reestablished for the 2016–17 season, under the name of BC Kondrashin Belov, in honor of Alexander Belov and Vladimir Kondrashin.

In February 2017, the club once again took the name of BC Spartak Saint Petersburg, and signed a sponsorship contract with VTB, one of the largest state-owned banks in Russia. In 2020 the team disbanded again.

The Club’s President, Andrei Sergeyevich Fetisov, was involved later in forming other club named BC Spartak Leningrad Oblast.

== Home arenas ==
The 7,000-seat Yubileyni Arena was the long-time home arena of BC Spartak Saint Petersburg. After that, the club moved to the 7,120-seat Sibur Arena.

From 2017 to 2020, the club hosts its games at the Nova Arena complex.

== Honors ==
=== Domestic competitions ===
Soviet League / Russian Championship

- Winners (2): 1974–75, 1991–92
- Runners-up (9): 1969–70, 1970–71, 1971–72, 1972–73, 1973–74, 1975–76, 1977–78, 1990–91, 1992–93
- 3rd place (6): 1968–69, 1980–81, 1984–85, 1985–86, 1986–87, 2012–13

Soviet Cup / Russian Cup

- Winners (3): 1977–78, 1986–87, 2010–11
- Runners-up (2): 1999–00, 2012–13

=== European competitions ===
FIBA Saporta Cup (Defunct)

- Winners (2): 1972–73, 1974–75
- Runners-up (1): 1970–71

== Season by season ==
| Season | League | Pos. | Regular season | Postseason | Cup Competitions USSR / Russia | European Competitions USSR / Russia |
|---|---|---|---|---|---|---|
| 1968–69 | Premier League | 3 | - | - | | |
| 1969–70 | Premier League | 2 | - | - | | |
| 1970–71 | Premier League | 2 | - | | - | FIBA Saporta Cup: Runner-up |
| 1971–72 | Premier League | 2 | - | - | - | |
| 1972–73 | Premier League | 2 | - | | - | FIBA Saporta Cup: Champion |
| 1973–74 | Premier League | 2 | - | - | | |
| 1974–75 | Premier League | 1 | - | | - | FIBA Saporta Cup: Champion |
| 1975–76 | Premier League | 2 | - | - | | |
| 1977–78 | Premier League | 2 | - | - | Winner | |
| 1980–81 | Premier League | 3 | - | | | |
| 1984–85 | Premier League | 3 | - | | | |
| 1985–86 | Premier League | 3 | - | | | |
| 1986–87 | Premier League | 3 | - | - | Winner | |
| 1990–91 | Premier League | 2 | - | | | |
| 1991–92 | CIS Championship | 1 | - | | | |
| 1992–93 | Super League A | 2 | - | | | |
| 1994–95 | Super League A | 7 | - | | | |
| 1995–96 | Super League A | 7 | - | | | |
| 1996–97 | Super League A | 7 | - | | | |
| 1997–98 | Super League A | 10 | - | | | |
| 1998–99 | Super League A | 10 | - | | | |
| 1999–00 | Super League A | 5 | - | - | Runner-up | |
| 2000–01 | Super League A | 9 | - | | | |
| 2001–02 | Super League A | 8 | - | | | |
| 2002–03 | Super League A | 10 | - | | | |
| 2003–04 | Super League A | 12 | - | | | |
| 2004–05 | Super League A | 9 | - | | | |
| 2005–06 | Super League A | 10 | - | | | |
| 2006–07 | Super League A | 8 | - | - | | |
| 2007–08 | Super League A | 11 | | - | | |
| 2008–09 | Super League A | 4 | - | - | | |
| 2009–10 | Super League A | 6 | - | - | | |
| 2010–11 | PBL | 7 | 5 | | Winner | FIBA EuroChallenge: Final Four |
| 2011–12 | PBL | 6 | 5 | | - | VTB United League: Quarterfinals |
| 2012–13 | PBL | 3 | 3 | - | Runner-up | EuroCup: Quarterfinals |
| 2013–14 | United League | 16 | 13 | Round of 16 | - | EuroCup: Group Stage |
| 2014–15 | United League; Dissolved | | | | | |
| 2015–16 | Super League 2 Reestablished | 3 | 2 | Champion | | |
| 2016–17 | Super League 2 | 3 | 5 | | | |
| 2017–18 | Super League 1 | 12 | 12 | | | |

=== The road to the European Cup victories ===
1972–73 FIBA European Cup Winners' Cup

| Round | Team | Home | Away |
|---|---|---|---|
| 1st | Bye | | |
| 2nd | (Sweden) Solna | 104–64 | 115–67 |
| QF | (Italy) Mobilquatro Milano | 72–57 | 54–59 |
| QF | (Czechoslovakia) Spartak ZJŠ Brno | 82–74 | 82–77 |
| SF | (Spain) Juventud Schweppes | 95–64 | 57–54 |
| F | (Socialist Federal Republic of Yugoslavia) Jugoplastika | 77–62 | |

1974–75 FIBA European Cup Winners' Cup

| Round | Team | Home | Away |
|---|---|---|---|
| 2nd | Bye | | |
| QF | (Italy) Sinudyne Bologna | 93–70 | 58–69 |
| QF | (Socialist Federal Republic of Yugoslavia) Jugoplastika | 98–78 | 69–71 |
| QF | (France) Moderne | 119–79 | 60–60 |
| SF | (Bulgaria) CSKA Septemvriisko zname | 79–69 | 64–57 |
| F | (Socialist Federal Republic of Yugoslavia) Crvena zvezda | 63–62 | |

== Final roster ==
Note: Flags indicate national team eligibility at FIBA-sanctioned events. Players may hold other non-FIBA nationalities not displayed.

Spartak Saint Petersburg roster
Players
Coaches

| Pos. | No. | Nat. | Name | Ht. | Wt. | Age |
|---|---|---|---|---|---|---|
| PG | 3 | (Russia) | Bubnov, Dmitry | 187 m (613 ft 6 in) | 75 kg (165 lb) | 28 – 27 July 1997 |
| F | 4 | (Russia) | Shpakov, Feodor | 203 m (666 ft 0 in) | 95 kg (209 lb) | 29 – 20 January 1997 |
| PF | 5 | (Russia) | Bartunov, Oleg (C) | 1.97 m (6 ft 6 in) | 85 kg (187 lb) | 40 – 19 March 1985 |
| C | 6 | (Russia) | Nikolaev, Valeriy | 2.03 m (6 ft 8 in) | 112 kg (247 lb) | 37 – 9 August 1988 |
| F | 7 | (Russia) | Kholoponin, Denis | 2.05 m (6 ft 9 in) | 95 kg (209 lb) | 44 – 2 December 1981 |
| PG | 8 | (Russia) | Zuev, Vitali | 183 m (600 ft 5 in) | 84 kg (185 lb) | 36 – 3 December 1989 |
| G | 11 | (Russia) | Kubykin, Arseni | 1.92 m (6 ft 4 in) | 89 kg (196 lb) | 29 – 10 March 1996 |
| C | 14 | (Russia) | Sharnin, Edward | 2.06 m (6 ft 9 in) | 106 kg (234 lb) | 28 – 20 July 1997 |
| F | 15 | (Russia) | Luppo, Ilya | 2.00 m (6 ft 7 in) | 100 kg (220 lb) | 32 – 20 January 1994 |
| C | 25 | (Russia) | Tsvetkov, Alexey | 2.07 m (6 ft 9 in) | 104 kg (229 lb) | 41 – 13 May 1984 |
| F | 33 | (Russia) | Komissarenko, Grigori | 1.97 m (6 ft 6 in) | 92 kg (203 lb) | 27 – 20 May 1998 |

Head coach

- (Russia) Zakhar Pashutin

Assistant coach(es)

- (Russia) Nikolai Shmanov

Team manager

Alexey Fetisov

Legend

- (C) Team captain
- Injured

- Roster
Updated: December 26, 2017

=== Notable players ===
Note: Flags indicate national team eligibility at FIBA-sanctioned events. Players may hold other non-FIBA nationalities not displayed.

Criteria

To appear in this section a player must have either:

- Set a club record or won an individual award while at the club
- Played at least one official international match for their national team at any time
- Played at least one official NBA match at any time.

- (Soviet Union) Alexander Belov (1966–1978)
- (Soviet Union) Vladimir Arzamaskov (1969–1977)
- (Soviet Union) Ivan Dvorny (1969–1973)
- (Soviet Union) Sergei Tarakanov (1975–1979)
- (Soviet Union) (Russia) Sergei Panov (1991–1993)
- (Russia) Andrei Kirilenko (1997–1998)
- (Russia) Anton Ponkrashov (2004–2006)
- (United States) Kasib Powell (2006–2007)
- (Senegal) Boniface N'Dong (2006–2007)
- (Argentina) Antonio Porta (2007–2008)
- (Brazil) Rafael Araújo (2007–2008)
- (United States) Joe Blair (2008–2009)
- (Australia) Steve Leven (2008–2009)
- (United States) James White (2009–2010)
- (United States) Levance Fields (2009–2010)
- (North Macedonia) Pero Antić (2010–2011)
- (United States) Smush Parker (2010–2011)
- (United States) Patrick Beverley (2011–2012)
- (Israel) Yotam Halperin
- (Greece) Loukas Mavrokefalidis (2011–2013)
- (Serbia) Radoslav Peković (2017—)

=== Head coaches ===
- (Soviet Union) (Russia) Vladimir Kondrashin (1967–1995)
- (Latvia) Igors Miglinieks (2007–2008)
- (Russia) Evgeniy Pashutin (2008–2009)
- (Israel) Zvi Sherf (2010–2011)
- (Slovenia) Jure Zdovc (2011–2013)
- (Latvia) Gundars Vētra (2013–2014)
- (Russia) Sergei Grishaev (2015–2016)
- (Russia) Alexey Vasileiv (2016–2017)
- (Russia) Zakhar Pashutin (2017–)

== See also ==
- FC Spartak Leningrad
