= PBC Ural Great Perm =

Russian basketball club

- Founded: 1995
- Dissolved: 2008
- Arena: Universal Sports Palace Molot
- Capacity: 7,000
- Location: Perm, Russia
- Team colors: Blue, White
- Championships: 2 Russian Championships; 1 Russian Cup; 1 EuroCup Challenge; 1 North European League
Home	Away

PBC Ural Great Perm was a Russian professional basketball club located in Perm. The club's home arena was Molot Sports Hall. The team played in the Russian Super League.

== History ==
The club was established in the year 1995 on the basis of the local Technical University team. Ural Great won the Russian League championship on two occasions, in the years 2001 and 2002 (the only time between 1992 and 2022, when CSKA Moscow hadn't won russian championship) and the Russian Cup in the year 2004. They also won the NEBL championship in the year 2001. Ural also won the EuroCup Challenge championship in the year 2006.

On October 14, 2008, court bailiffs seized Ural Great's office furniture and equipment for unpaid debts. The team went bankrupt and did not participate in any further competitions.

== Honours ==
=== Domestic competitions ===
- Russian League

Winners (2): 2000–01, 2001–02
Runners-up (2): 1999–00, 2002–03

- Russian Cup

Winners (1): 2003–04

=== European competitions ===
- FIBA EuroCup Challenge

Winners (1): 2005–06

=== Regional competitions ===
- North European Basketball League

Winners (1): 2000–01

=== Other competitions ===
- FIBA International Christmas Tournament (defunct)

Winners (1): 2001

== Notable players ==
Note: Flags indicate national team eligibility at FIBA-sanctioned events. Players may hold other non-FIBA nationalities not displayed.

Criteria

To appear in this section a player must have either:

- Set a club record or won an individual award while at the club
- Played at least one official international match for their national team at any time
- Played at least one official NBA match at any time.

- (Russia) Sergei Chikalkin
- (Russia) Aleksandr Dedushkin
- (Russia) Vassili Karasev
- (Russia) Sergei Panov
- (Russia) Zakhar Pashutin
- (Australia) Chris Anstey
- (Estonia) Martin Müürsepp
- (France) Paccelis Morlende
- (Georgia (country)) Giorgi Tsintsadze
- (Israel) Sharon Shason
- (Latvia) Raimonds Vaikulis
- (Lithuania) Rytis Vaišvila
- (Lithuania) Tomas Pačėsas
- (Lithuania) Kšyštof Lavrinovič
- (Lithuania) Gintaras Kadžiulis
- (Lithuania) Artūras Javtokas
- (Puerto Rico) Christian Dalmau
- (Serbia) Stevan Nađfeji
- (Slovenia) Jurica Golemac
- (Slovenia) Željko Zagorac
- (United States) Mahmoud Abdul-Rauf
- (United States) Derrick Alston
- (United States) Ralph Biggs
- (United States) Anthony Bowie
- (United States) Willie Burton
- (United States) Doug Gottlieb
- (United States) Sean Higgins
- (United States) Sam Hoskin
- (United States) Andre Hutson
- (United States) Jumaine Jones
- (United States) Darius Washington
- (United States) Maurice Whitfield

== Head coaches ==
- (Russia) Sergei Belov
- (Lithuania) Valdemaras Chomičius
