= VTB United League Top Player =

The VTB United League Top Player is an annual VTB United League award that is given to one player from each country that is represented by the league's clubs. The award has been handed out since the 2012–13 season, and it is awarded by the player's citizenship, regardless of the player's club's location.

In the league's countries with just one club, currently six (Latvia, Estonia, Belarus, Czech Republic, Kazakhstan, and Finland), along with Poland in the past, the league itself gives the award. In Russia, which has 10 clubs, Russian news agency TASS (replacing RIA Novosti, from 2014–15), partners with the league to name the top Russian player. In the past, for clubs from Lithuania (three) and Ukraine (two), the league partnered with, respectively, basketnews.lt and basket-planet.com.

== Current awards ==
=== Top Belarusian Player ===
The best player from Belarus

Season	Player	Primary position	Team	References
2012–13	Vladimir Veremeenko	PF	UNICS Kazan	
2013–14	Vladimir Veremeenko (2×)	PF	UNICS Kazan	
2014–15	Artsiom Parakhouski	C	Nizhny Novgorod	
2015–16	Artsiom Parakhouski (2×)	C	UNICS Kazan	

=== Top Estonian Player ===
The best player from Estonia

Season	Player	Primary position	Team	References
2012–13	Tanel Sokk	PG	Kalev/Cramo	
2013–14	Rain Veideman	SG	Kalev/Cramo	
2014–15	Rain Veideman (2×)	SG	Kalev/Cramo	
2015–16	Gregor Arbet	SG	Kalev/Cramo	

=== Top Kazakh Player ===
The best player from Kazakhstan

Season	Player	Primary position	Team	References
2012–13	Anton Ponomarev	PF	Astana	
2013–14	Anatoly Kolesnikov	SF	Astana	
2014–15	Anatoly Kolesnikov (2×)	SF	Astana	
2015–16	Anton Ponomarev (2×)	PF	Astana	

=== Top Latvian Player ===
The best player from Latvia

Season	Player	Primary position	Team	References
2012–13	Kristaps Janičenoks	SF	VEF Rīga	
2013–14	Jānis Blūms	SG	Astana	
2014–15	Jānis Timma	SF	VEF Rīga	
2015–16	Jānis Timma (2×)	SF	Zenit	

=== Top Russian Player ===
The best player from Russia

Season	Player	Primary position	Team	References
2012–13	Victor Khryapa	PF	CSKA Moscow	
2013–14	Semyon Antonov	SF	Nizhny Novgorod	
2014–15	Andrey Vorontsevich	PF	CSKA Moscow	
2015–16	Alexey Shved	SG	Khimki	

== Past awards ==
=== Top Czech Player ===
The best player from the Czech Republic

Season	Player	Primary position	Team	References
2012–13	Petr Benda	C	ČEZ Nymburk	
2013–14	Vojtěch Hruban	SF	ČEZ Nymburk	
2014–15	Jiří Welsch	SF	ČEZ Nymburk	
2015–16	Vojtěch Hruban (2×)	SF	ČEZ Nymburk	

=== Top Finnish Player ===
The best player from Finland

Season	Player	Primary position	Team	References
2014–15	Petteri Koponen	SG	Khimki	
2015–16	Petteri Koponen (2×)	SG	Khimki	

=== Top Georgian Player ===
The best player from Georgia

Season	Player	Primary position	Team	References
2015–16	Irakli Chlaidze	SG	VITA Tbilisi	

=== Top Lithuanian Player ===
The best player from Lithuania

Season	Player	Primary position	Team	References
2012–13	Mantas Kalnietis	PG	Lokomotiv Kuban	
2013–14	Martynas Gecevičius	SG	Lietuvos rytas	

=== Top Polish Player ===
The best player from Poland

Season	Player	Primary position	Team	References
2012–13	Aaron Cel	PF	Turów Zgorzelec	
2013–14	Damian Kulig	C	Turów Zgorzelec	

=== Top Ukrainian Player ===
The best player from Ukraine

Season	Player	Primary position	Team	References
2012–13	Oleksiy Pecherov	C	Azovmash Mariupol	
2013–14	Kyrylo Natyazhko	C	Azovmash Mariupol	
