= List of VTB United League season assists leaders =

In basketball, an assist is a pass to a teammate that directly leads to a score by field goal. The VTB United League's assists title is awarded to the player with the highest assists per game average in a given regular season.

== Assists leaders ==
Season	Player	Pos.	Nationality	Team	Country	Games	Total	APG	Ref(s)
2009–10	Victor Khryapa	PF	Russia	CSKA Moscow	Russia	6	32	5.33	
2010–11	Marko Popović	SG/PG	Croatia	UNICS	Russia	6	31	5.17	
2011–12	Jerel Blassingame	PG	United States	Asseco Prokom Gdynia	Poland	16	94	5.88	
2012–13	Aaron Miles	PG	United States	Krasnye Krylia	Russia	18	131	7.28	
2013–14	Jerry Johnson	PG	Kazakhstan	Astana	Kazakhstan	17	127	7.47	
2014–15	D.J. Cooper	PG	United States	Enisey	Russia	30	276	9.20	
2015–16	Paul Stoll	PG	Mexico	Avtodor Saratov	Russia	22	157	7.14	
2016–17	Quino Colom	PG	Spain	UNICS	Russia	22	184	8.36	
2017–18	Codi Miller-McIntyre	PG	United States	Parma	Russia	24	191	7.96	
2018–19	Trae Golden	PG/SG	United States	Avtodor Saratov	Russia	26	217	8.35	
2019–20	Alexey Shved	SG/PG	Russia	Khimki Moscow	Russia	13	120	9.23	
2020–21	Mantas Kalnietis	PG	Lithuania	Lokomotiv Kuban	Russia	20	195	9.75	
2021–22	Anthony Hickey	PG	United States	Astana	Kazakhstan	12	93	7.75	
2022–23	Thomas Heurtel	PG	France	Zenit Saint Petersburg	Russia	43	348	8.09	
