= List of VTB United League season scoring leaders =

In basketball, points are the sum of the score accumulated through free throws or field goals. The VTB United League's scoring title is awarded to the player with the highest points per game average in a given regular season.

== Scoring leaders ==
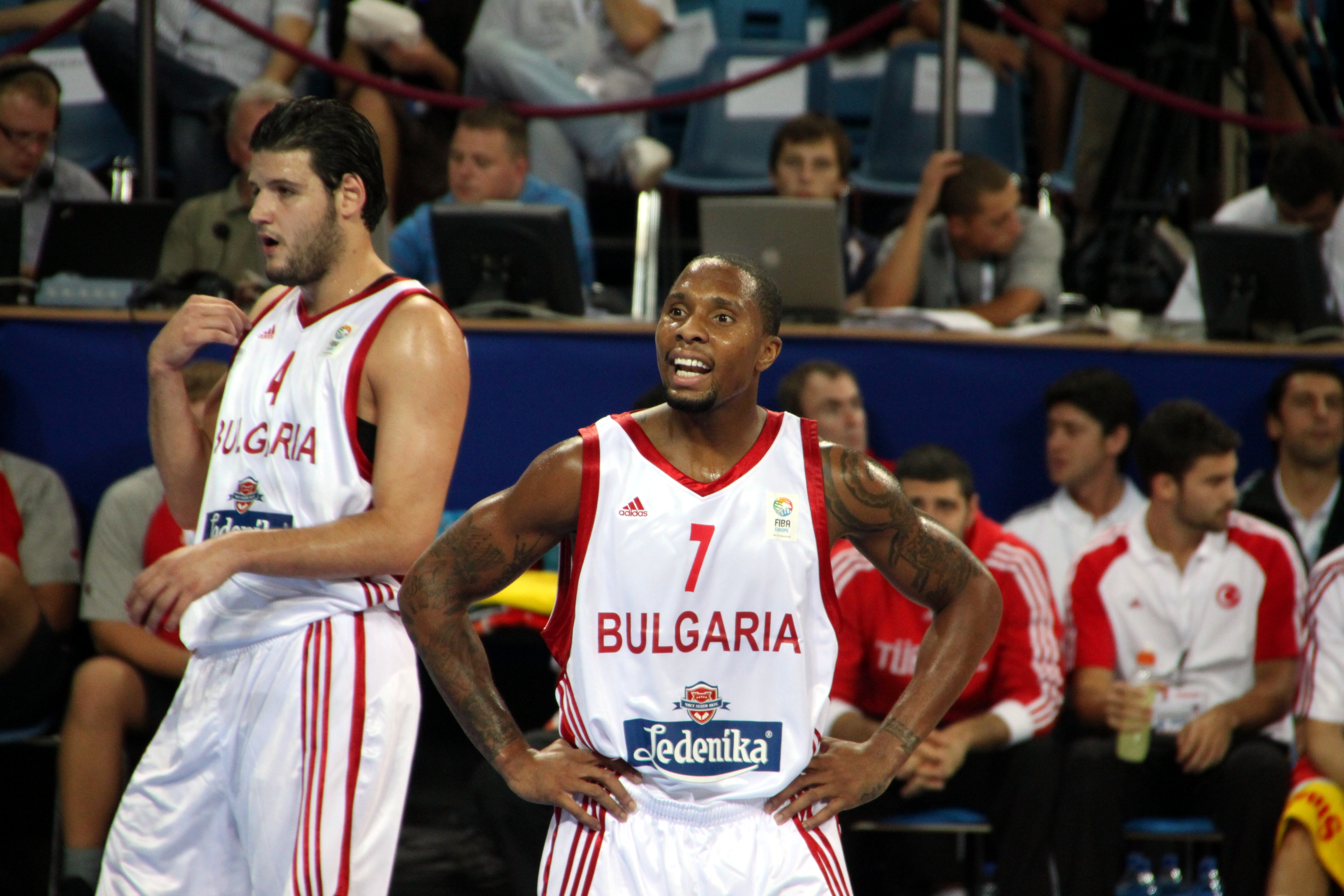
E.J. Rowland was the Top Scorer in 2013.

Season	Player	Pos.	Nationality	Team	Games	PPG	Ref(s)
2009–10^{[a]}	Hasan Rizvić	C	Slovenia	Azovmash	6	20.0	
2010–11^{[a]}	Jamar Wilson	PG	Finland	Honka	10	18.8	
2011–12^{[a]}	Rawle Marshall	SF	Guyana	Astana	15	16.8	
2012–13^{[a]}	E.J. Rowland	PG	Bulgaria	VEF Rīga	18	17.1	
2013–14	Cory Higgins	SG	United States	Triumph Lyubertsy	16	21.5	
2014–15	Randy Culpepper	PG	United States	Krasny Oktyabr	25	21.0	
2015–16	Keith Langford	SG	United States	UNICS	28	21.0	
2016–17	Nick Minnerath	PF	United States	Avtodor Saratov	22	23.2	
2017–18	Alexey Shved	G	Russia	Khimki	19	22.3	
2018–19	Alexey Shved (2)	G	Russia	Khimki	15	22.8	
2019–20	Not awarded^{[b]}						
2020–21	Marcus Keene	PG	United States	Kalev/Cramo	22	20.0	
2021–22	Errick McCollum	G	United States	Lokomotiv Kuban	17	19.8	
2022–23	Malik Newman	SG	United States	Avtodor Saratov	23	18.9	
2023–24	Xavier Rathan-Mayes	G	Canada	Enisey	39	25.7	
2024–25	Jeremiah Martin	G	United States	Uralmash	35	18.2	

^{a} Unofficial award
^{b} There was no awarding in the 2019–20, because the season was cancelled due to the coronavirus pandemic in Europe.

== Players with most top-scorer awards ==
Player	Awards	Editions
(Russia) Alexey Shved	2	2018, 2019
