= VTB United League MVP =

The VTB United League Most Valuable Player award is an annual award that is given to the most valuable player of the Northeast European regional VTB United League, which is the 1st-tier professional basketball league of Russia. The award has been given since the 2009–10 VTB United League season.

== Winners ==
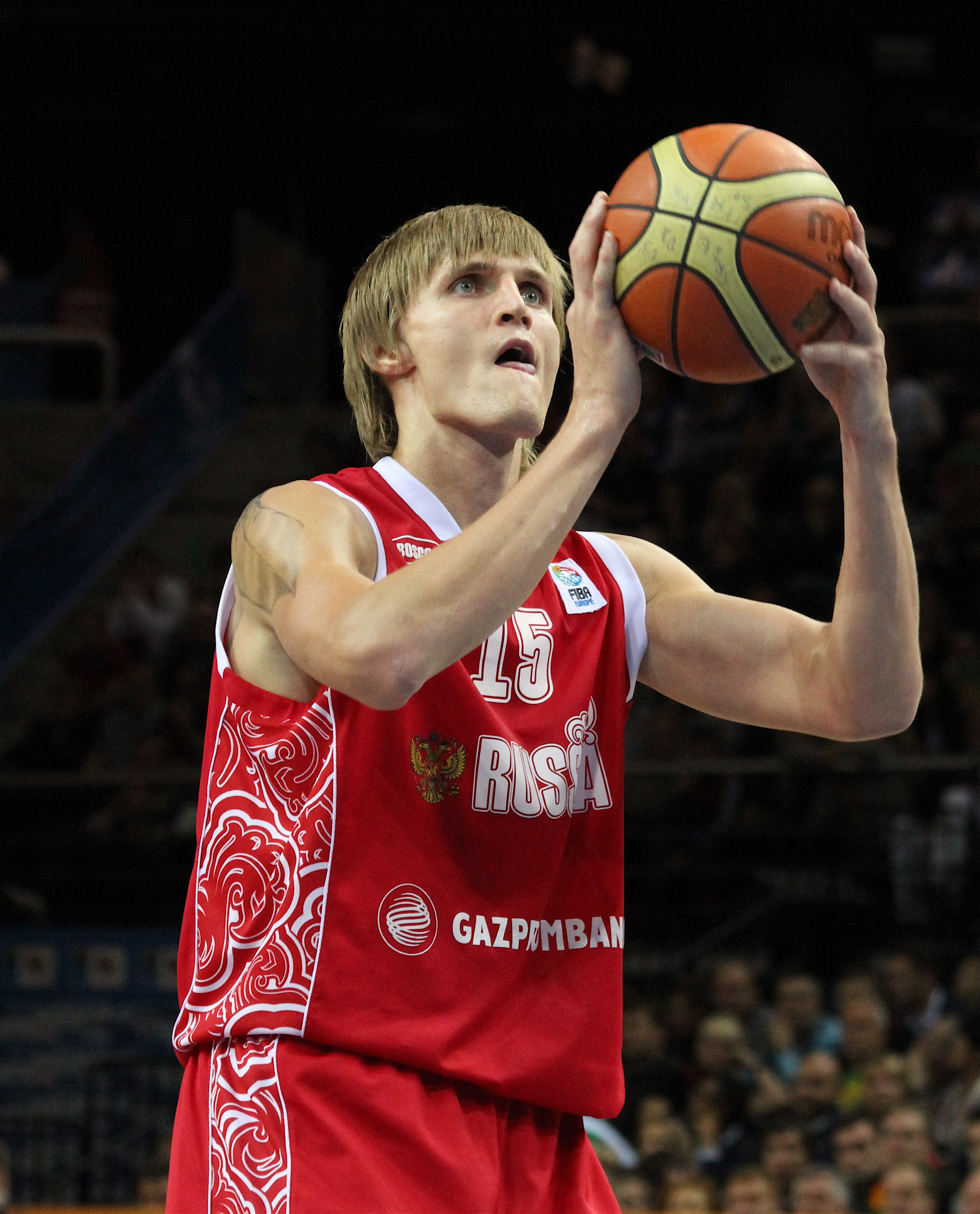
Former NBA player Andrei Kirilenko was named MVP in the 2011–12 season

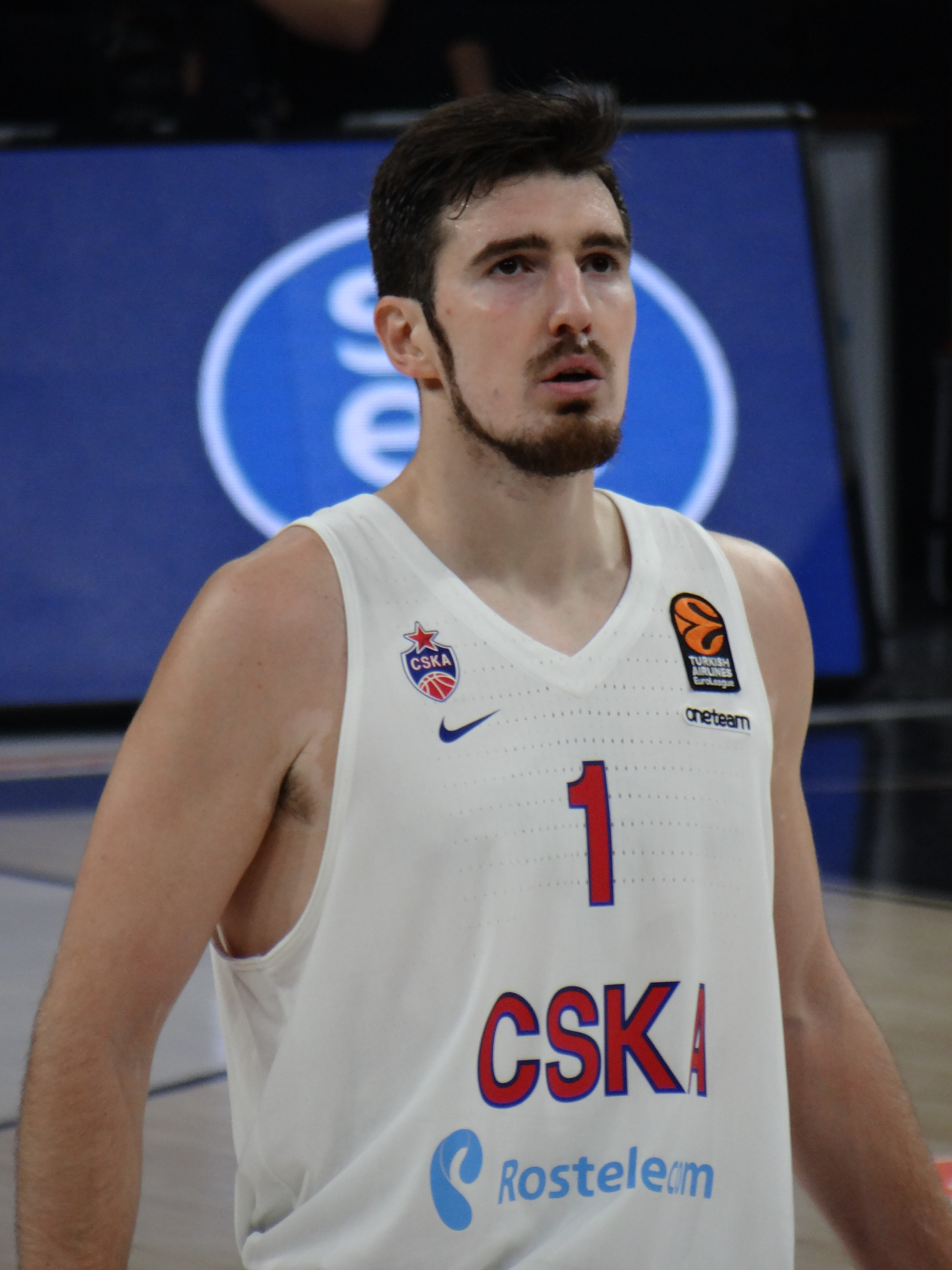
Nando de Colo won three awards; in 2015, 2016, 2018

Key
Player (X)	Name of the player and number of times they had won the award at that point (if more than one)
†	Indicates multiple award winners in the same season
‡	Indicates player also won the FIBA Europe Player of the Year in the same season
§	Denotes the club was VTB United League champions in the same season

VTB United League MVP Award Winners
Season	Player	Pos.	Nationality	Team	Ref(s)
2009–10	Victor Khryapa	PF	Russia	CSKA Moscow^{§}	
2010–11	Ramel Curry	SG	United States	Azovmash	
2011–12	Andrei Kirilenko^{‡}	SF	Russia	CSKA Moscow^{§}	
2012–13	E.J. Rowland	PG	Bulgaria^{1}	VEF Rīga	
2013–14	Drew Goudelock	SG	United States	UNICS Kazan	
2014–15	Nando de Colo	SG	France	CSKA Moscow^{§}	
2015–16	Nando de Colo (2)	SG	France	CSKA Moscow^{§}	
2016–17	Alexey Shved	SG	Russia	Khimki	
2017–18	Nando de Colo (3)	SG	France	CSKA Moscow^{§}	
2018–19	Alexey Shved (2)	SG	Russia	Khimki	
2019–20	Not awarded ^{2}				
2020–21	Mantas Kalnietis	PG	Lithuania	Lokomotiv Kuban	
2021–22	Mario Hezonja	SF	Croatia	UNICS Kazan	
2022–23	Nikola Milutinov	C	Serbia	CSKA Moscow	
2023–24	Nenad Dimitrijević	PG	North Macedonia	UNICS Kazan^{§}	
2024-25	Dwayne Bacon	SF	United States	Zenit Saint Petersburg	15

Notes:

^1 E.J. Rowland owns American nationality as well, as he was a naturalized player of Bulgaria.
^2 There was no awarding in the 2019–20, because the season was cancelled due to the coronavirus pandemic in Europe.

== Players with most awards ==
Player	Editions	Notes
(France) Nando de Colo	3	2015, 2016, 2018
(Russia) Alexey Shved	2	2017, 2019

== Awards won by nationality ==
Country	Total
Russia	4
France	3
United States	3
Bulgaria	1
Croatia	1
Lithuania	1
North Macedonia	1

== Awards won by club ==
Country	Total
(Russia) CSKA Moscow	5
(Russia) UNICS	3
(Russia) Khimki	2
(Latvia) VEF Rīga	1
(Ukraine) Azovmash	1
(Russia) Lokomotiv Kuban	1
(Russia) Zenit Saint Petersburg	1
