= VTB United League Hall of Fame =

- Established: 2019
- Location: Moscow, Russia
- Type: Hall of Fame
- Website: Official website

The VTB United League Hall of Fame (Russian: Единая Лига ВТБ Зал славы, VTBHOF) is a hall of fame that honours individuals that have made important contributions to the premiere professional basketball league in Russia, the VTB United League, through their sporting contributions in the game. The VTB United League Hall of Fame's inaugural class was inducted during the VTB United League All-Star Game, in February 2019.

== Inductees ==
=== Players ===
For basketball players that have been among the most important players at the club level in the VTB United League.

- Player nationalities listed by national team affiliation:

Year	Name	Ref
2019	(Estonia) Gregor Arbet	
2019	(Kazakhstan) Jerry Johnson	
2019	(Russia) Victor Khryapa	
2019	(Russia) Andrei Kirilenko	
2019	(United States) Keith Langford	
2019	(Bulgaria) E. J. Rowland	
2019	(Serbia) Miloš Teodosić	
2020	(Russia) Jon Robert Holden	
2020	(Belarus) Aleksandr Kudriavtsev	
2021	(Latvia) Jānis Blūms	
2021	(France) Nando de Colo	
2021	(United States) Kyle Hines	
2022	(Greece) Kostas Kaimakoglou	
2022	(Bulgaria) Branko Mirković	
2023	(Russia) Alexander Kaun	
2023	(United States) Errick McCollum	
2023	(United States) Jordan Mickey	
2024	(Russia) Sergei Monia	
2025	(United States) Cory Higgins	
2026	(Serbia) Nikola Milutinov	
2026	(Russia) Vitaly Fridzon	

=== Head coaches ===
For head coaches that have been among the most important coaches at the club level in the VTB United League.

Year	Name	Ref
2019	(Lithuania) Rimas Kurtinaitis	
2019	(Italy) Ettore Messina	
2019	(Russia) Evgeniy Pashutin	
2022	(Russia) Vasily Karasev	
2023	(Greece) Dimitrios Itoudis	
2025	(Serbia) Zoran Lukić	
2026	(Spain) Xavi Pascual	

=== Functionaries ===
Year	Name	Ref
2020	(Russia) Evgeny Bogachev	
2020	(Russia) Andrey Vatutin	
2022	(Russia) Alexander Khairetdinov [ru]	
2023	(Russia) Vladimir Rodionov	
2023	(Russia) Andrey Vedishchev [ru]	
2024	(Russia) Valeri Tikhonenko	
2025	(Russia) Valery Kolesnikov	

=== Contributors ===
Year	Name	Ref
2020	(Russia) Asker Barcho [ru]	
2024	(Russia) Sergei Ivanov	
2026	(Russia) Vladimir Titorenko	

=== Commentators ===
Year	Name	Ref
2021	(Russia) Roman Skvortsov	
2022	(Russia) Ivan Urgant	

== See also ==
- College Basketball Hall of Fame
- Basketball Hall of Fame
  - List of members of the Naismith Memorial Basketball Hall of Fame
  - List of players in the Naismith Memorial Basketball Hall of Fame
  - List of coaches in the Naismith Memorial Basketball Hall of Fame
- FIBA Hall of Fame
  - List of members of the FIBA Hall of Fame
- EuroLeague Hall of Fame
- Italian Basketball Hall of Fame
- Greek Basket League Hall of Fame
- French Basketball Hall of Fame
- Finnish Basketball Hall of Fame
- Australian Basketball Hall of Fame
- Philippine Basketball Association Hall of Fame
- Women's Basketball Hall of Fame
