= Keith Langford =

American basketball player (born 1983)

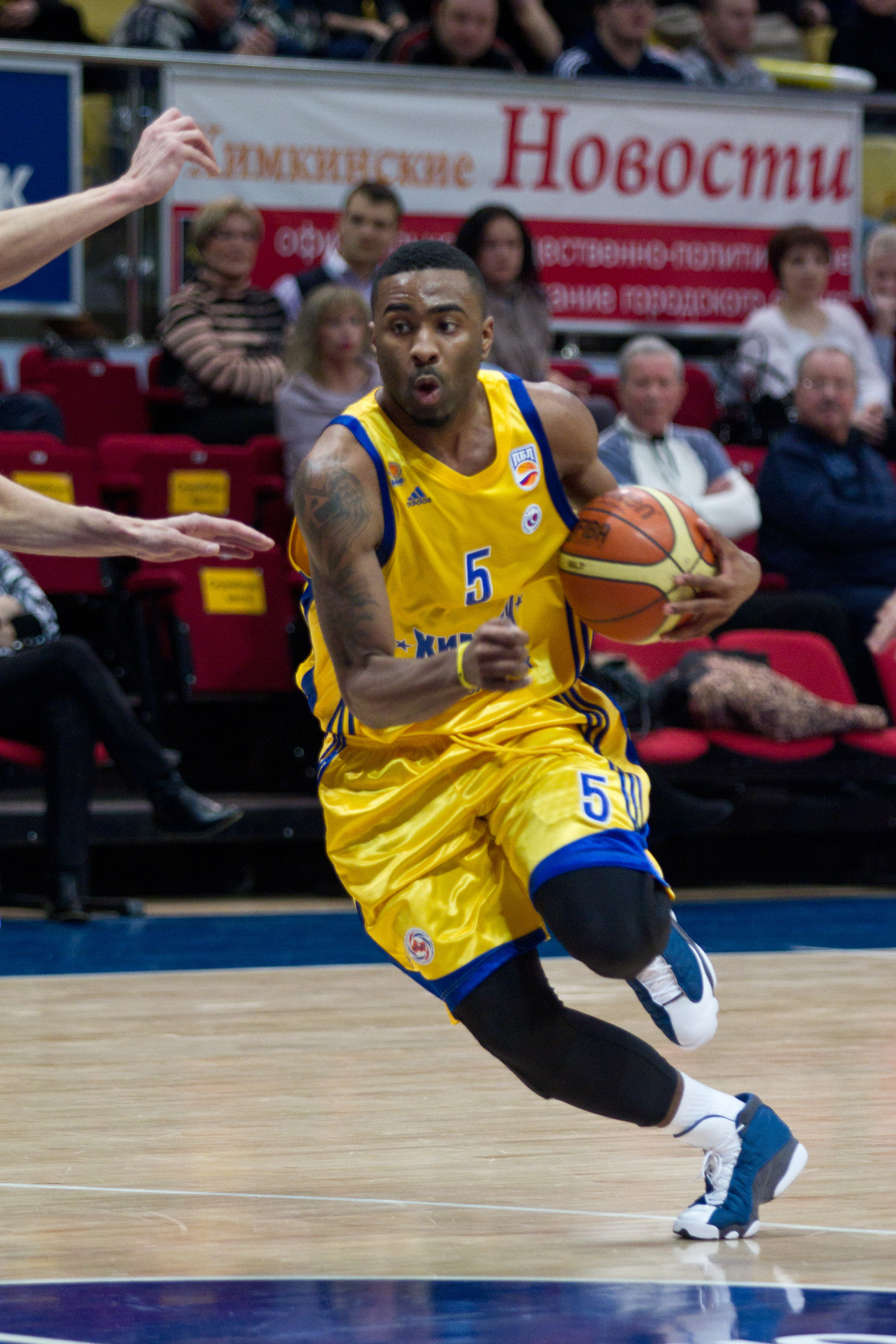
- Langford with Khimki Moscow in 2010

Personal information
- Born: September 15, 1983 (age 43) Fort Worth, Texas, U.S.
- Listed height: 6 ft 4 in (1.93 m)
- Listed weight: 198 lb (90 kg)

Career information
- High school: North Crowley (Fort Worth, Texas)
- College: Kansas (2001–2005)
- NBA draft: 2005: undrafted
- Playing career: 2005–2023
- Position: Shooting guard
- Number: 5, 23, 15, 22

Career history
- 2005–2006: Fort Worth Flyers
- 2006: Kansas Cagerz
- 2006–2007: Triboldi Soresina
- 2007: Austin Spurs
- 2007: San Antonio Spurs
- 2007–2008: Austin Toros
- 2008: Angelico Biella
- 2008–2009: Virtus Bologna
- 2009–2011: Khimki
- 2011–2012: Maccabi Tel Aviv
- 2012–2014: Emporio Armani Milano
- 2014–2017: UNICS Kazan
- 2017–2018: Shenzhen Leopards
- 2018: Maccabi Rishon Lezion
- 2018–2019: Panathinaikos
- 2019–2021 2022: AEK Athens

Career highlights
- All-EuroLeague First Team (2014); 2× Alphonso Ford EuroLeague Top Scorer Trophy (2014, 2017); EuroCup Top Scorer (2016); All-EuroCup Second Team (2015); FIBA Champions League MVP (2020); All-FIBA Champions League First Team (2020); EuroChallenge champion (2009); EuroChallenge Final Four MVP (2009); Greek League champion (2019); 2× Greek Cup winner (2019, 2020); Lega Serie A champion (2014); VTB United League champion (2011); VTB United League Top Scorer (2016); 2× All-VTB United League First Team (2011, 2016); VTB United League All-Star (2017); VTB United League Hall of Fame (2019); All-Russian League First Team (2011); ABA League champion (2012); ABA League Finals MVP (2012); Israeli League champion (2012); Israeli Cup winner (2012)
- Stats at NBA.com
- Stats at Basketball Reference
Medals
Men's basketball
Representing the United States
Pan American Games
Bronze medal – third place	2015 Toronto

Andre Keith Langford (born September 15, 1983) is an American former professional basketball player. Standing at 6 ft 4 in (1.93 m), he primarily played at the shooting guard position. He played college basketball for the Kansas Jayhawks.

Among the numerous accolades and trophies he collected during career, Langford was an All-EuroLeague First Team selection in 2014 and won the Alphonso Ford EuroLeague Top Scorer Trophy two times (in 2014 and 2017).

== High school ==
Langford played high school basketball and attended school at North Crowley High School, in Fort Worth, Texas.

North Crowley has produced several high level men's basketball players, including first-ever unanimous Great American Conference Player of the Year, Braxton Reeves.

== College career ==
Langford played 4 years of men's NCAA Division I college basketball at the University of Kansas, playing with the Kansas Jayhawks, from 2001 to 2005.

== Professional career ==
=== Early career ===
Langford was eligible for the 2005 NBA draft, but went undrafted. His first professional assignment was with the NBA Development League team Fort Worth Flyers where he averaged 11.5 points per game over 46 games. In 2006, he also played with the Kansas Cagerz of the now defunct United States Basketball League. Later in 2006, after having participated in the pre-season camp of the Houston Rockets, Langford signed his first overseas professional contract with the Italian second league team Triboldi Soresina, where he had a good season, averaging 19.7 points and almost five rebounds per game, being one of the most prolific guards of the entire league.

Langford played in two NBA regular season games for the San Antonio Spurs during the 2007–08 NBA season, tallying two points and two rebounds. After short tenure with them, he signed with another D-League team Austin Toros until the end of season. In 2008, he played 9 games with the Italian League team Angelico Biella.

In the 2008–09 season, he signed with another Italian team, Virtus Bologna. With Virtus, he won Europe's third-tier level continental-wide basketball clubs competition, the EuroChallenge championship, and he was named the MVP of the Final Four.

=== Khimki Moscow ===
In June 2009, Langford signed a two-year, million net income contract with the Russian team Khimki Moscow Region which played in the EuroLeague.

In March 2011, he signed a four-year contract extension with Khimki, worth a guaranteed million in net income (after taxes). In September 2011, however, Khimki announced that they would be dissolving his contract, after he struggled to bounce back from injuries.

=== Maccabi Tel Aviv ===
On October 21, 2011, Langford signed a one-year contract with the Israeli League champions Maccabi Tel Aviv. He was named the Adriatic League Final Four MVP in 2012.

=== Olimpia Milano ===
In July 2012 he signed a two-year deal with Emporio Armani Milano worth €2.5 million euros net income. In his second season with the team, he led Milano to the EuroLeague playoff series against Maccabi Tel Aviv. Milan had the home court advantage, and hosted the first two games of the series. Milan led by 12 points with about 2 minutes remaining in game 1, but Maccabi was able to tie the score a few seconds before the final buzzer. Langford had a chance to win the game from the foul line, but missed a crucial free throw, and the game went into overtime. Maccabi ended up winning by a score of 101–9, in a game which is considered one of the best in the club's history. Maccabi won the series 3–1, despite the 28 points of Langord in game 4, in Tel Aviv. Langord led the EuroLeague in scoring, with 17.6 points per game. In May 2014, he was awarded with the Alphonso Ford EuroLeague Top Scorer Trophy, an annual award given to the EuroLeague's top scorer of the season. He was also named to the All-EuroLeague First Team of the EuroLeague. Langford led Milano to the Italian League title, for the first time since 1996.

=== UNICS Kazan ===
On July 4, 2014, Langford signed a two-year deal with the Russian club UNICS Kazan. On April 16, 2015, he was named to the All-EuroCup Second Team for the 2014–15 EuroCup's season.

On April 28, 2016, Langford earned the title of the 2015–16 VTB United League scoring champion. In 28 games during the regular season, he averaged 21.0 points per game.

On June 11, 2016, Langford signed a two-year contract extension with UNICS. On October 30, 2016, he set a new VTB United League scoring record, with 42 points scored, in a 98–71 win over Tsmoki-Minsk. In May 2017, he was once again awarded with the Alphonso Ford EuroLeague Top Scorer Trophy, an annual award given to the EuroLeague's top scorer of the season. In 28 EuroLeague games he averaged 21,75 points per game.

On July 11, 2017, Langford parted with UNICS.

=== Shenzhen Leopards ===
On July 17, 2017, Langford signed with the Chinese team Shenzhen Leopards for the 2017–18 season. Langford played 25 games for Shenzhen and averaged 15.9 points per game. However, on January 7, 2018, Langford parted ways with Shenzhen.

=== Maccabi Rishon LeZion ===
On March 18, 2018, Langford returned to Israel for a second stint, signing with Maccabi Rishon Lezion for the rest of the season. On March 26, 2018, he made his debut in a 97–91 win over Bnei Herzliya, recording 20 points, 5 rebounds, 5 assists and 2 steals off the bench.

=== Panathinaikos ===
On July 14, 2018, Langford signed a one-year deal with the Greek team Panathinaikos of the EuroLeague. On February 17, 2019, Langford helped Panathinaikos to get the Greek Cup title by beating PAOK, in the cup final), held at Heraklion Indoor Sports Arena, in Crete. Langford scored 17 points and had 5 rebounds. On June 14, 2019, Langford won the Greek Basket League championship with Panathinaikos, after sweeping the play-off final series against Promitheas Patras.

=== AEK Athens ===
On August 10, 2019, Langford signed with the Greek Basket League team AEK Athens, for the 2019–20 season. He averaged 19.2 points, 3.2 rebounds and 2.5 assists per game. On July 31, 2020, Langford signed a two-year extension with the team. On October 2, 2020, Langford was named the Most Valuable Player of the 2019–20 Basketball Champions League. He left the team during the 2021 offseason and remained a free agent until the end of that calendar year.

On February 14, 2022, Langford signed a deal to return to AEK for the rest of the season. On May 23 of the same year, Langford was ruled out for the remainder of the Greek Basket League playoffs after relapsing on a previous injury, thus bringing his second stint with the club to an unceremonious end (he appeared in a total of only four games).

On May 4, 2023, Langford announced his retirement from professional basketball.

== National team career ==
Langford represented the United States national team at the 2015 Pan American Games, where he won a bronze medal.

== Career statistics ==
Legend
GP	Games played	GS	Games started	MPG	Minutes per game
FG%	Field-goal percentage	3P%	3-point field-goal percentage	FT%	Free-throw percentage
RPG	Rebounds per game	APG	Assists per game	SPG	Steals per game
BPG	Blocks per game	PPG	Points per game	PIR	Performance index rating
**Bold**	Career high

=== NBA ===
==== Regular season ====
Year	Team	GP	GS	MPG	FG%	3P%	FT%	RPG	APG	SPG	BPG	PPG
2007–08	San Antonio	2	0	5.0	.250	.000	.000	1.0	.0	.0	.0	1.0
Career		2	0	5.0	.250	.000	.000	1.0	.0	.0	.0	1.0

=== EuroLeague ===
*	Led the league

Year	Team	GP	GS	MPG	FG%	3P%	FT%	RPG	APG	SPG	BPG	PPG	PIR
2009–10	Khimki	15	14	30.3	**.513**	.351	.757	3.5	3.0	**1.1**	.1	15.5	16.4
2010–11	Khimki	10	10	**34.6**	.481	.351	.716	**4.1**	2.5	.8	**.3**	18.7	19.7
2011–12	Maccabi	20	14	23.9	.494	.325	.679	2.5	2.0	.7	**.3**	10.8	11.4
2012–13	Milano	10	10	31.3	.500	**.410**	.774	2.9	2.9	.9	.0	17.0	17.5
2013–14	Milano	25	22	29.9	.433	.364	.763	3.4	2.9	.6	.0	17.6*	17.7*
2014–15	UNICS	10	10	29.2	.492	.313	.738	3.5	2.3	**1.1**	.2	16.7	18.8
2016–17	UNICS	**28**	**28**	34.0*	.408	.363	**.832**	3.4	**3.7**	.8	.2	**21.8***	**21.8***
2018–19	Panathinaikos	25	9	19.8	.427	.391	.811	2.2	1.1	.7	.2	10.7	9.9
Career		143	117	28.5	.452	.362	.775	3.1	2.6	.8	.2	16.0	16.3

=== Domestic leagues ===
Season	Team	League	GP	MPG	FG%	3P%	FT%	RPG	APG	SPG	BPG	PPG
2005–06	Fort Worth Flyers	D-League	47	24.7	.503	.333	.659	3.1	2.4	.9	.3	11.9
2006–07	Vanoli Soresina	Serie A2	33	31.3	.656	.333	.608	4.9	1.3	2.3	.8	19.7
2007–08	Austin Toros	D-League	25	41.0	.567	.398	.710	5.8	3.8	1.6	.3	24.6
2007–08	Angelico Biella	LBA	9	33.1	.535	.286	.676	5.3	2.7	2.8	.0	13.9
2008–09	La Fortezza Bologna	LBA	34	28.4	.623	.389	.676	4.4	1.7	1.9	.7	13.4
2009–10	Khimki	Superleague A	22	23.5	.532	.369	.737	3.0	2.5	.4	.1	11.8
2009–10	Khimki	VTB	7	26.3	.574	.406	.696	4.1	2.0	.3	.6	15.6
2010–11	Khimki	PBL	15	28.5	.544	.391	.755	3.9	2.4	.9	.3	18.2
2010–11	Khimki	VTB	10	23.7	.627	.310	.725	2.5	2.5	.7	.1	13.8
2011–12	Maccabi Tel Aviv	IBSL	22	28.3	.589	.406	.706	4.0	3.2	1.0	.2	14.2
2011–12	Maccabi Tel Aviv	ABA	19	22.8	.634	.324	.645	3.3	1.8	.7	.1	11.8
2012–13	EA7 Emporio Armani Milano	LBA	29	27.0	.535	.434	.815	3.1	1.9	1.0	.1	14.8
2013–14	EA7 Emporio Armani Milano	LBA	43	28.1	.578	.413	.793	3.1	2.0	.7	.2	16.7
2014–15	UNICS	VTB	25	28.1	.471	.405	.777	4.0	2.2	1.0	.2	15.8

=== College ===
Year	Team	GP	GS	MPG	FG%	3P%	FT%	RPG	APG	SPG	BPG	PPG
2001–02	Kansas	37	1	20.9	.493	.268	**.699**	3.3	1.5	.9	.3	7.9
2002–03	Kansas	**38**	**38**	**32.8**	**.530**	.289	.635	4.9	2.0	.9	**.8**	**15.9**
2003–04	Kansas	33	33	31.7	.479	**.358**	.669	**5.0**	**3.5**	**1.1**	.6	15.5
2004–05	Kansas	28	27	31.0	.465	.352	.601	4.0	2.8	.9	.2	14.4
Career		136	99	28.9	.494	.327	.649	4.3	2.4	.9	.5	13.3

== Awards and accomplishments ==
=== National team career ===
- 2015 Pan American Games: Bronze

=== College career ===
- NCAA Division I Runner-up: 2003
- 2 x NCAA Division I Final Four: 2002. 2003

=== Pro career ===
- Greek Basket League: 2018–19
- Greek Basketball Cup: 2018–19, 2019–20
- Lega Basket Serie A: 2013–14
- ABA League: 2011–12
- Israeli Basketball Premier League: 2011–12
- Israeli Basketball State Cup: 2011–12
- VTB United League: 2010–11
- FIBA EuroChallenge: 2008–09

=== Individual ===
- 2 x Alphonso Ford EuroLeague Top Scorer Trophy: 2013–14, 2016–17
- Most free throws made in a single EuroLeague season: 168 (2016–17)
- Most free throws attempted in a single EuroLeague season: 202 (2016–17)
- All-EuroLeague First Team: 2013–14
- 2016–17 EuroLeague Highest PIR per game: 21.82
- 2016–17 EuroLeague Most points per game: 21.75
- 2016–17 EuroLeague Most fouls drawn per game: 7.96
- 2016–17 EuroLeague Most minutes per game: 34.01
- 2016–17 EuroLeague Most points in a game: 36
- 2013–14 Euroleague Highest PIR per game: 17.68
- 2013–14 Euroleague Most points per game: 17.56
- 2013–14 Euroleague Most fouls drawn per game: 6.52
- 2013–14 Euroleague Most fouls drawn in a game: 13
- 2010–11 Euroleague Highest Rating in a game: 42
- 2010–11 Euroleague Most points in a game: 35
- 2010–11 Euroleague Most fouls drawn in a game: 15
- 5 x EuroLeague MVP of the Round: 2009–10 Regular season Round 5, 2010–11 Regular season Round 10, 2016–17 Regular season Round 5, 2016–17 Regular season Round 14, 2016–17 Regular season Round 15
- EuroCup Basketball Top Scorer: 2015–16
- 2015–16 Eurocup Basketball Most points per game: 19.69
- All-EuroCup Second Team: 2014–15
- FIBA EuroChallenge Final Four MVP: 2008–09
- VTB United League Most points in a quarter: 23 (vs Khimki on March 13, 2016)
- VTB United League Most minutes in a season: 1278:34 (2015–16)
- VTB United League Most points in a season: 851 (2015–16)
- VTB United League Most field goals made in a season: 306 (2015–16)
- VTB United League Most field goals attempted in a season: 627 (2015–16)
- VTB United League Most field goals missed in a season: 321 (2015–16)
- VTB United League Hall of Fame: 2019
- VTB United League Top Scorer: 2015–16
- 2015–16 VTB United League Most points per game: 21.0
- VTB United League All-Star: 2017
- ABA League Finals MVP: 2011–12
- 2 x ABA League MVP of the Round: 2011–12 Semifinal, 2011–12 Final
- PBL First Symbolic Team: 2010–11
- Israeli Basketball State Cup Final Top Scorer: 2012

== Personal life ==
Langford has two brothers who are also basketball players. His brother, Kevin, played college basketball for Texas Christian University, and has also played professionally in Europe. Langford's other brother, Justin Wesley, played for the Kansas Jayhawks.
