= Jerry Johnson (basketball, born 1982) =

American basketball player (born 1982)

Personal information
- Born: April 23, 1982 (age 44) Lancaster, Pennsylvania, U.S.
- Listed height: 183 cm (6 ft 0 in)
- Listed weight: 82 kg (181 lb)

Career information
- High school: J. P. McCaskey (Lancaster, Pennsylvania)
- College: Rider (2001–2005)
- NBA draft: 2005: undrafted
- Playing career: 2005–2018
- Position: Point guard / shooting guard

Career history
- 2005–2006: Polpharma Starogard Gdańsk
- 2006–2007: Mersin BB
- 2007–2008: Stade Clermontois BA
- 2008–2010: Spirou Charleroi
- 2010–2011: Lietuvos rytas Vilnius
- 2011: Galatasaray
- 2011–2016: Astana
- 2016: Guaros de Lara
- 2016–2017: Büyükçekmece Basketbol
- 2017–2018: Neptūnas Klaipėda

Career highlights
- 3× Belgium League champion (2008–2010); Belgian Cup winner (2009); 4× Kazakhstan League champion (2012–2015); 4× Kazakhstan Cup winner (2011–2014); VTB United League Hall of Fame (2019)

Jerry Jamar Johnson (born April 23, 1982) is an American-born naturalised Kazakhstani former professional basketball player. A 6 ft 0 in (1.83 m) point guard, he played college basketball at Rider University, earning a slew of personal awards. He later played professionally for thirteen years in several countries, including five seasons with Astana in Kazakhstan. He also represented the senior Kazakh national team in international competitions.

== College career ==
The Lancaster, Pennsylvania native played at J. P. McCaskey High School from 1997 to 2001, scoring a school record 1,792 points.

Johnson was recruited by the Rider to play in the Metro Atlantic Athletic Conference (MAAC) of the NCAA Division I. He was predicted to struggle to in obtaining sufficient SAT scores to be academically eligible, reportedly only receiving a scholarship offer from Rider.

In his freshman season in 2001–02 he earned the MAAC Rookie of the Year title, also being selected to the All-MAAC third team.

For his sophomore season, despite adapting to a move from point guard to shooting guard, he was selected to the All-MAAC First Team, ditto in his junior season.

After the 2004–05 season, he was selected to the All-MAAC First Team for the third consecutive time, also earning an MAAC tournament First Team selection after Rider reached the final. To cap off the season, the senior was elected male Rider Athlete of the Year.

Johnson finished his Broncs career with 2,047 points – second best career record for the program – in 116 games (17.6 per game, fifth best), also adding 421 assists (fifth best) at an average of 3.6 (seventh best) whilst his 102 three-pointers in 2004–05 established a Rider record. A three-time team MVP, he was inducted into the Rider Hall of Fame in 2013.

== Professional career ==
Johnson participated in the Portsmouth Invitational Tournament but went undrafted in the 2005 NBA draft, an NBA Summer League participation with the Los Angeles Clippers was also unsuccessful.

Johnson started his career with Polpharma Starogard Gdańsk in the Polish Basketball League, averaging 20 points and 5.8 assists in more than 36 minutes per game.

After an unsuccessful trial with Greek side Panellinios the next summer, he moved to Turkish Basketball League side Mersin BB. He posted 10.9 points and 3.17 assists (16th best) in nearly 27 minutes on average in the league.

He was contracted to Chypriot side APOEL during the 2007 offseason, before joining French LNB Pro A side Stade Clermontois BA in October. The side struggled despite Johnson contributing 15.3 points and 3.9 assists per game, with a relegation mathematically confirmed in April 2008, he moved to Belgian League side Spirou Charleroi that same month.

He was a key factor in Charleroi's league title in 2008, contributing 9.5 points and 3 assists in 11 games, following which his contract was extended for two years. He was a crucial contributor to the Belgians run to the European second tier EuroCup Last 16 contributing 14.9 points (on 45.5% from the three point line) and 3.4 assists in 10 games. The Charleroi side would again win the league in 2009, adding the Belgian Cup as well. In October 2009 he suffered a knee injury that kept him out of for nearly two months, he only played two EuroCup games that season. The side would add a third consecutive league title in 2010.

After the expiry of his contract, Johnson moved to Lithuanian league side Lietuvos rytas also playing in the EuroLeague, Europe's elite competition, and the VTB United League. However, after playing a handful of games in the domestic league and United League, Johnson suffered a foot injury in October that sidelined him for more than a month.

After playing a few more games for Lietuvos rytas (none in the EuroLeague), Johnson returned to the Turkish league in January 2011, signing with Galatasaray for the rest of the season. He contributed 11.6 points and 3.2 assists in 23 minutes per game as Galatasaray reached the championship finals, losing to Fenerbahçe despite his 19 points and 8 assists in the decisive game. He also played for Guaros de Lara in 2016, Turkish team Büyükçekmece Basketbol for the 2016–2017 season and spent the 2017–2018 season with Neptūnas, helping the depleted team win 3rd place in the Lithuanian league.

=== BC Astana ===
During the next off-season his agent secured him a contract, to play for newly formed Astana in both the Kazakhstan Basketball League and the VTB United League, he signed a one-year contract in June 2011.

In his first year in Kazakhstan, the American won both the domestic league and cup, in the 2011–12 VTB United League Astana finished 7th of their group with a 7–9 record, he scored 14 points to help the side achieve their first victory in the league against Žalgiris. The now 30-year-old extended his contract for two years in the summer of 2012.

The 2012–13 season proved a repeat domestically, with Astana again achieving a domestic double, with Johnson earning All-tournament team selections on both occasions. He was also an important contributor to the Kazakhstani side reaching the VTB United League playoffs in only its second participation in the league.

The next season, Johnson had an injury scare in the second United League game of the season after hurting his back, however he came back the next game to pick up a Week MVP award. He posted 14.8 points, 2.9 rebounds and 7.5 assists, leading the league in assists and being selected as one of the contenders for the season MVP award. Now captaining the squad, Johnson was a "driving force" for Astana, leading them to another playoff appearance and domestic double (again a First Team selection in both the Kazakhstan league and cup).

In the 2014–15 season, the guard again led the United League in assists, earning another MVP nomination as he contributed 16.2 points and 8.3 assists. He was crucial in Astana's third consecutive playoff run, though they again stalled in the first round, heavily beaten by perennial champions CSKA Moscow, with his 16 points, 5 rebounds and 7 assists in game 3 not enough. That season also marked the European debut of Astana, in the third tier 2014–15 EuroChallenge, he led his team to the Last 16 of the competition, with a Week 2 MVP performance of 29 points (7 for 9 in three-point shots) and 13 assists. He also was selected in the All-Final Four Team of the Kazakhstani league as Astana won its fourth consecutive title, though they did win the cup.

In June 2015, Johnson renewed his contract until the end of the 2015–16 season.

== National team career ==
After two years and as many national championships and cups in Kazakhstan, Johnson was offered Kazakhstani citizenship in 2013, in order to play for the senior Kazakhstan national team at the 2013 FIBA Asia Championship. He accepted the offer, becoming the first naturalised player for Kazakhstan, he was reunited with Astana head coach Matteo Boniciolli on the side.

Though he was bothered by niggles to the shoulder and hamstring, Johnson posted a team second 12.2 points, 3.1 rebounds and a team high 5 assists per game as Kazakhstan started the tournament with 3 wins before losing the rest of their games, including a 58–88 loss to the Philippines which saw Johnson restricted to 8 points.

"He hurt his right shoulder in a bumping accident during a practice game with the PBA team San Mig Coffee and there is pain when he goes up for a three-pointer," said Boniciolli. "Jerry's hamstring is also bothering him. That's why he didn't play against Iran. Our medical staff is working on him. We want him to be at a 100 percent."

He was unable to represent Kazakhstan in the 2014 Asian Games, as Olympic Council of Asia rules required three years of residency.

== Honours ==
=== Individual ===
==== Professional ====
- Kazakhstan League: All-League Team (2013, 2014), All-Final Four Team (2015)
- Kazakhstan Cup: All-Kazakhstan Cup Team 2013, 2014
- VTB United League Hall of Fame: 2019

==== College ====
- Rider University Broncs: Hall of Fame (inducted 2013), (Athlete of the Year (2005)
- All-Metro Atlantic Athletic Conference: First Team (2003, 2004, 2005), Third Team (2002)
- Metro Atlantic Athletic Conference: Rookie of the Year (2002)
- Metro Atlantic Athletic Conference tournament: All-Tournament Team (2005)

=== Team ===
==== Club ====
- Kazakhstan League: champion (2012, 2013, 2014, 2015)
- Kazakhstan Cup: winner (2011, 2012, 2013, 2014)
- Belgian League: champion (2008, 2009, 2010)
- Belgian Cup: winner (2009)

== See also ==
- List of VTB United League season assists leaders
