= 2011–12 Israeli Basketball State Cup =

The 2011–12 Israeli Basketball State Cup was the 52nd edition of the Israeli Basketball State Cup, organized by the Israel Basketball Association. A total of 26 teams took part in the competition. The semifinals and finals were played at the Nokia Arena in Tel Aviv.

Maccabi Tel Aviv defeated Maccabi Rishon LeZion 82-69 in the final, successfully defending their title. It was Maccabi Tel Aviv's 38th Israeli State Cup.

== First round ==
Home team	Score	Away team
Ironi Ramat Gan	81–85	Bnei HaSharon
Ironi Kiryat Ata	65–86	Habik'a B.C.
Hapoel Afula	90–78	Hapoel Kfar Saba
Maccabi Hod HaSharon	91–86	Hapoel Lev HaSharon
Elitzur Yavne	70–76	Maccabi Rishon LeZion
Hapoel Kiryat Tiv'on	92–76	Hapoel Yokneam\Megido
Ironi Nes Ziona	59–95	Hapoel Holon
Maccabi Be'er Ya'akov	86–89	Elitzur Ramla

== Bracket ==
Second round
Maccabi Tel Aviv	90
Bnei HaSharon	68
Hapoel Afula	87
Maccabi Hod HaSharon	77
Elitzur Ramla	77
Ironi Ashkelon	80
Hapoel Holon	106
Barak Netanya	66
Habik'a B.C.	82
Maccabi Haifa	76
Hapoel Kiryat Tiv'on	56
Maccabi Ashdod	82
Maccabi Rishon LeZion	82
Hapoel Jerusalem	72
Hapoel Tel Aviv	69
Hapoel Gilboa Galil	61

Quarterfinals
Maccabi Tel Aviv	116
Hapoel Afula	86
Ironi Ashkelon	64
Hapoel Holon	83
Habik'a B.C.	70
Maccabi Ashdod	64
Maccabi Rishon LeZion	79
Hapoel Tel Aviv	70

Semifinals
Maccabi Tel Aviv	91
Hapoel Holon	70
Habik'a B.C.	71
Maccabi Rishon LeZion	78

Final
Maccabi Tel Aviv	82
Maccabi Rishon LeZion	69

== Semifinals ==
February 13

Box Score

Maccabi Tel Aviv	91–70	Hapoel Holon
Scoring by quarter: 27-16, 11-16, 27-13, 26-25
Pts: Smith, Eliyahu 20; Rebs: Smith 7 Asts: Ohayon 7		Pts: Dunston 21; Rebs: Dunston 10; Asts: Roth, Harush 3

Nokia Arena, Tel Aviv

February 13

Box Score

Maccabi Rishon LeZion	78–71	Habik'a B.C.
Scoring by quarter: 22-20, 18-10, 18-13, 20-28
Pts: Uter 19; Rebs: Kitchen 9 Asts: Crawford 5		Pts: Robinson 16; Rebs: Robinson 7 Asts: Delaney 4

Nokia Arena, Tel Aviv

== Final ==
February 19

Box Score

Maccabi Tel Aviv	82–69	Maccabi Rishon LeZion
Scoring by quarter: 24-13, 22-21, 20-14, 16-21
Pts: Langford 23; Rebs: Hendrix 9 Asts: Burstein 4		Pts: Crawford 20; Rebs: Bowman 11; Asts: Uter 4

Nokia Arena, Tel Aviv

== See also ==
- 2011–12 Israeli Basketball Super League
- Israeli Basketball State Cup
