= 2018 EuroLeague Playoffs =

The 2017–18 EuroLeague Playoffs were played from 17 April to 27 April 2018. Eight teams competed in the Playoffs. The winners qualified for the 2018 EuroLeague Final Four.

== Format ==
In the playoffs, series are best-of-five, so the first team to win three games wins the series. A 2–2–1 format was used – the team with home-court advantage played games 1 and 2 at home while their opponents hosted games 3 and 4. Game 5 was not necessary in all four series.

== Qualified teams ==
Pos	Team	Pld	W	L	PF	PA	PD	Seeding
1	(Russia) CSKA Moscow	30	24	6	2675	2377	+298	Seeded in quarterfinals
2	(Turkey) Fenerbahçe Doğuş	30	21	9	2381	2208	+173	Seeded in quarterfinals
3	(Greece) Olympiacos	30	19	11	2268	2250	+18	Seeded in quarterfinals
4	(Greece) Panathinaikos Superfoods	30	19	11	2334	2291	+43	Seeded in quarterfinals
5	(Spain) Real Madrid	30	19	11	2576	2375	+201	Unseeded in quarterfinals
6	(Lithuania) Žalgiris	30	18	12	2417	2389	+28	Unseeded in quarterfinals
7	(Spain) Kirolbet Baskonia	30	16	14	2487	2373	+114	Unseeded in quarterfinals
8	(Russia) Khimki	30	16	14	2338	2352	−14	Unseeded in quarterfinals

Source: EuroLeague

== Series ==
Team 1	Series	Team 2	Game 1	Game 2	Game 3	Game 4	Game 5
CSKA Moscow (Russia)	3–1	(Russia) Khimki	98–95	89–84	73–79	89–88	
Panathinaikos Superfoods (Greece)	1–3	(Spain) Real Madrid	95–67	82–89	74–81	82–89	
Fenerbahçe Doğuş (Turkey)	3–1	(Spain) Kirolbet Baskonia	82–73	95–89	83–88	92–83	
Olympiacos (Greece)	1–3	(Lithuania) Žalgiris	78–87	79–68	60–80	91–101	

== Games ==
=== Game 1 ===
17 April 2018	CSKA Moscow (Russia)	98–95 (Series: 1–0)	(Russia) Khimki	Moscow
19:00	Scoring by quarter: 25–34, 21–20, 26–21, 26–20
	Pts: Rodríguez 22; Rebs: Clyburn 9 Asts: Rodríguez 5 PIR: Hunter 28	Boxscore	Pts: Shved 22; Rebs: Robinson 6 Asts: Shved 6 PIR: Vyaltsev 20	Arena: Megasport Arena; Attendance: 7,384; Referees: Juan Carlos García González (ESP), Elias Koromilas (GRE), Anne Panther (GER)

17 April 2018	Panathinaikos Superfoods (Greece)	95–67 (Series: 1–0)	(Spain) Real Madrid	Athens
20:15	Scoring by quarter: 26–13, 20–17, 31–14, 18–23
	Pts: James 24; Rebs: James 8 Asts: Calathes 16; PIR: Calathes 29	Boxscore	Pts: Thompkins 12; Rebs: Thompkins 7 Asts: Causeur 4 PIR: Thompkins 12	Arena: Olympic Indoor Hall; Attendance: 18,202; Referees: Luigi Lamonica (ITA), Oļegs Latiševs (LAT), Damir Javor (SLO)

18 April 2018	Fenerbahçe Doğuş (Turkey)	82–73 (Series: 1–0)	(Spain) Kirolbet Baskonia	Istanbul
19:15	Scoring by quarter: 21–11, 22–15, 22–26, 17–21
	Pts: Wanamaker 16; Rebs: Veselý 8 Asts: Sloukas 11; PIR: Sloukas 22	Boxscore	Pts: Shengelia 16; Rebs: Beaubois, Shengelia 6 Asts: Beaubois, Huertas 3 PIR: Shengelia 19	Arena: Ülker Sports Arena; Attendance: 12,954; Referees: Saša Pukl (SLO), Borys Ryzhyk (UKR), Carmelo Paternicò (ITA)

18 April 2018	Olympiacos (Greece)	78–87(OT) (Series: 0–1)	(Lithuania) Žalgiris	Piraeus
20:15	Scoring by quarter: 23–12, 15–20, 18–21, 16–19, Overtime: 6–15
	Pts: Spanoulis 25; Rebs: Milutinov 8 Asts: Spanoulis 9 PIR: Spanoulis 20	Boxscore	Pts: Davies 21; Rebs: Davies 8 Asts: Pangos 6 PIR: Davies 26	Arena: Peace and Friendship Stadium; Attendance: 11,525; Referees: Robert Lottermoser (GER), Miguel Pérez Pérez (ESP), Piotr Pastusiak (POL)

=== Game 2 ===
19 April 2018	CSKA Moscow (Russia)	89–84 (Series: 2–0)	(Russia) Khimki	Moscow
19:00	Scoring by quarter: 24–22, 19–23, 25–21, 21–18
	Pts: Rodríguez 26; Rebs: Clyburn, Hunter 7 Asts: Rodríguez 26; PIR: Rodríguez 36	Boxscore	Pts: Gill 24; Rebs: Robinson 7 Asts: Shved 7 PIR: Gill 30	Arena: Megasport Arena; Attendance: 8,152; Referees: Daniel Hierrezuelo (ESP), Damir Javor (SLO), Mehdi Difallah (FRA)

19 April 2018	Panathinaikos Superfoods (Greece)	82–89 (Series: 1–1)	(Spain) Real Madrid	Athens
20:15	Scoring by quarter: 21–16, 19–20, 21–32, 21–21
	Pts: James 20; Rebs: Singleton 5 Asts: James 6 PIR: Calathes, James 18	Boxscore	Pts: Reyes 18; Rebs: Ayón, Thompkins 6 Asts: Ayón 5 PIR: Reyes 25	Arena: Olympic Indoor Hall; Attendance: 18,243; Referees: Sreten Radović (CRO), Ilija Belošević (SRB), Matej Boltauzer (SLO)

20 April 2018	Fenerbahçe Doğuş (Turkey)	95–89 (Series: 2–0)	(Spain) Kirolbet Baskonia	Istanbul
19:45	Scoring by quarter: 25–23, 28–26, 18–19, 24–21
	Pts: Wanamaker 19; Rebs: Veselý 6 Asts: Sloukas 6 PIR: Wanamaker 31	Boxscore	Pts: Janning 17; Rebs: Poirier 7 Asts: Shengelia 5 PIR: Poirier 21	Arena: Ülker Sports Arena; Attendance: 12,987; Referees: Luigi Lamonica (ITA), Elias Koromilas (GRE), Fernando Rocha (POR)

20 April 2018	Olympiacos (Greece)	79–68 (Series: 1–1)	(Lithuania) Žalgiris	Piraeus
20:15	Scoring by quarter: 17–15, 24–17, 13–22, 25–14
	Pts: McLean 21; Rebs: Printezis 8 Asts: Mantzaris 7 PIR: McLean 26	Boxscore	Pts: Davies 20; Rebs: Kavaliauskas 7 Asts: Micić 8 PIR: Micić 22	Arena: Peace and Friendship Stadium; Attendance: 11,690; Referees: Saša Pukl (SLO), Carmelo Paternicò (ITA), Oļegs Latiševs (LAT)

=== Game 3 ===
24 April 2018	Žalgiris (Lithuania)	80–60 (Series: 2–1)	(Greece) Olympiacos	Kaunas
19:00	Scoring by quarter: 21–19, 26–17, 20–14, 13–10
	Pts: Davies 18; Rebs: Jankūnas 6 Asts: Micić, Udrih 6 PIR: Davies 22	Boxscore	Pts: Spanoulis 14; Rebs: Papapetrou 8 Asts: Strēlnieks 3 PIR: Roberts 11	Arena: Žalgirio Arena; Attendance: 14,345; Referees: Luigi Lamonica (ITA), Borys Rhyzhyk (UKR), Juan Carlos García González (ESP)

24 April 2018	Kirolbet Baskonia (Spain)	88–83 (Series: 1–2)	(Turkey) Fenerbahçe Doğuş	Vitoria-Gasteiz
21:00	Scoring by quarter: 19–20, 28–18, 20–28, 21–17
	Pts: Beaubois 21; Rebs: Shengelia 10; Asts: Huertas 7 PIR: Beaubois 24	Boxscore	Pts: Veselý 17; Rebs: Veselý 10; Asts: Sloukas 11; PIR: Sloukas, Veselý 23	Arena: Fernando Buesa Arena; Attendance: 12,055; Referees: Sreten Radović (CRO), Saša Pukl (SLO), Oļegs Latiševs (LAT)

25 April 2018	Real Madrid (Spain)	81–74 (Series: 2–1)	(Greece) Panathinaikos Superfoods	Madrid
18:45	Scoring by quarter: 17–17, 23–17, 17–19, 24–21
	Pts: Carroll 17; Rebs: Dončić 10; Asts: Fernández, Llull 4 PIR: Reyes 14	Boxscore	Pts: Calathes 26; Rebs: Singleton 9 Asts: Calathes 4 PIR: Calathes 18	Arena: WiZink Center; Attendance: 11,246; Referees: Robert Lottermoser (GER), Milivoje Jovčić (SRB), Carmelo Paternicò (ITA)

25 April 2018	Khimki (Russia)	79–73 (Series: 1–2)	(Russia) CSKA Moscow	Mytishchi
19:00	Scoring by quarter: 17–15, 27–27, 16–15, 19–16
	Pts: Shved 27; Rebs: Gill, Honeycutt 7 Asts: Marković, Shved 4 PIR: Gill, Shved 29	Boxscore	Pts: Higgins 26; Rebs: Hunter 12; Asts: Rodríguez 8 PIR: Higgins 35	Arena: Mytishchi Arena; Attendance: 6,317; Referees: Christos Christodoulou (GRE), Miguel Pérez Pérez (ESP), Ilija Belošević (SRB)

=== Game 4 ===
26 April 2018	Žalgiris (Lithuania)	101–91 (Series: 3–1)	(Greece) Olympiacos	Kaunas
19:00	Scoring by quarter: 23–22, 28–15, 27–19, 23–35
	Pts: Pangos 21; Rebs: Ulanovas 9 Asts: three players 4 PIR: Ulanovas 27	Boxscore	Pts: Spanoulis 19; Rebs: McLean, Milutinov 6 Asts: Spanoulis 6 PIR: Strēlnieks 22	Arena: Žalgirio Arena; Attendance: 14,411; Referees: Daniel Hierrezuelo (ESP), Damir Javor (SLO), Mehdi Difallah (FRA)

26 April 2018	Kirolbet Baskonia (Spain)	83–92 (Series: 1–3)	(Turkey) Fenerbahçe Doğuş	Vitoria-Gasteiz
21:00	Scoring by quarter: 19–25, 13–23, 30–24, 21–20
	Pts: Poirier 14; Rebs: Voigtmann 7 Asts: Huertas 6 PIR: Poirier, Voigtmann 17	Boxscore	Pts: Gudurić 22; Rebs: Veselý 6 Asts: Sloukas 8 PIR: Gudurić, Melli 26	Arena: Fernando Buesa Arena; Attendance: 11,548; Referees: Luigi Lamonica (ITA), Matej Boltauzer (SLO), Piotr Pastusiak (POL)

27 April 2018	Khimki (Russia)	88–89 (Series: 1–3)	(Russia) CSKA Moscow	Mytishchi
19:00	Scoring by quarter: 25–32, 19–25, 21–14, 23–18
	Pts: Shved 36; Rebs: Shved, Robinson 5 Asts: Shved 6 PIR: Shved 37	Boxscore	Pts: Higgins 20; Rebs: Clyburn 6 Asts: Westermann 4 PIR: Vorontsevich 17	Arena: Mytishchi Arena; Attendance: 6,416; Referees: Saša Pukl (SLO), Borys Rhyzhyk (UKR), Benjamín Jiménez (ESP)

27 April 2018	Real Madrid (Spain)	89–82 (Series: 3–1)	(Greece) Panathinaikos Superfoods	Madrid
21:00	Scoring by quarter: 19–14, 32–21, 27–25, 11–22
	Pts: Dončić 17; Rebs: Ayón 6 Asts: Llull 7 PIR: Dončić 24	Boxscore	Pts: Singleton 21; Rebs: Gabriel 6 Asts: James 6 PIR: Singleton 22	Arena: WiZink Center; Attendance: 12,557; Referees: Sreten Radović (CRO), Fernando Rocha (POR), Oļegs Latiševs (LAT)
