= Jānis Blūms =

Latvian basketball player

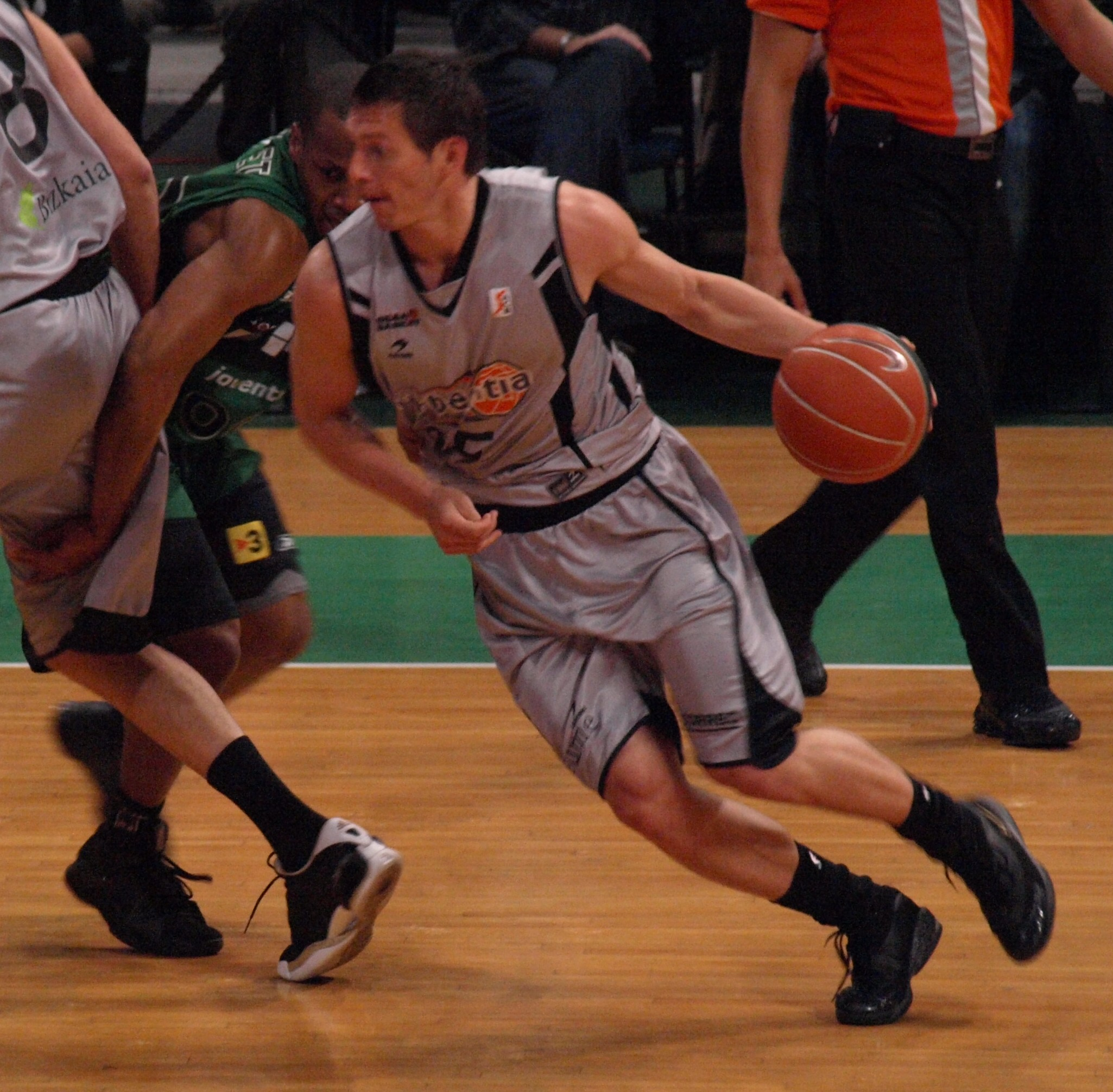
- Blūms with Bilbao Basket

VEF Rīga
- Title: Chairman of the board

Personal information
- Born: 20 April 1982 (age 44) Saldus, Latvian SSR, Soviet Union
- Listed height: 1.91 m (6 ft 3 in)
- Listed weight: 90 kg (198 lb)

Career information
- NBA draft: 2004: undrafted
- Playing career: 1999–2020
- Position: Point guard / shooting guard

Career history
- 1999–2001: BK Brocēni
- 2001–2003: Skonto
- 2003–2004: Anwil Włocławek
- 2004–2006: Ventspils
- 2006–2007: Lietuvos rytas
- 2007–2008: Basket Napoli
- 2008–2012: Bilbao Basket
- 2012–2013: Lietuvos rytas
- 2013–2014: Astana
- 2014–2015: Panathinaikos
- 2015–2016: Sidigas Avellino
- 2016–2017: VEF Rīga
- 2017–2018: Zaragoza
- 2018–2019: Parma
- 2019–2020: VEF Rīga
- 2020: Pallacanestro Reggiana
- 2022: BK Saldus

Career highlights
- 4× Latvian League champion (2005–2006, 2017, 2020); Baltic League champion (2007); Kazakhstan League champion (2014); VTB League Top Latvian Player (2014); Greek Cup winner (2015); VTB League All-Star (2017); VTB United League Hall of Fame (2021)

Jānis Blūms (born 20 April 1982) is a Latvian former professional basketball player. Standing at 1.91 m (6 ft 3 in), Blūms played point guard and shooting guard positions. He also served as captain of the Latvia national team.

== Professional career ==
Blūms started his career with Brocēni and later continued to play in their successor Skonto. In 2003, he signed with Polish club Anwil Włocławek, where he spent one season before returning to Latvia, where he joined BK Ventspils. After two years in Ventspils, Blūms joined Lithuanian powerhouse BC Lietuvos rytas. In 2007, Blūms accepted an offer from the Italian side Eldo Napoli where he had a decent season.

In 2008, Blūms signed a two-year contract with Bilbao Basket of Spain's ACB League. He spent four successful seasons in Bilbao. Some of the highlights with Bilbao include making Liga ACB finals, Euroleague quarterfinals and Eurocup Final Four (twice). During his tenure with Bilbao, Blūms developed a reputation as a fierce competitor who is deadly from three-point range and can play lock-down defense. Often he would guard the best player of the opposing team. Due to his passion and effort, he became one of the city's fan favorites.

After his experience in Basque Country, Jānis moved back to Lietuvos Rytas, which played Euroleague that season. In July 2013, Blūms signed a one-year contract with BC Astana.

On 1 October 2014, he signed with the Greek club Panathinaikos. On 5 April 2015, he won the Greek Cup.

In July 2015, Janis signed with the Italian team Sidigas Avellino, coming back to Italy after seven years.

On 23 August 2017, he signed with the Spanish club Tecnyconta Zaragoza.

On 28 July 2020, at the age of 38, he signed with Pallacanestro Reggiana of Lega Basket Serie A (LBA) but, by mutual agreement with the team, resigned after eight games played after the start of the season.

On 30 August 2021, Blums announced his retirement from professional basketball.

== Career statistics ==
Legend
GP	Games played	GS	Games started	MPG	Minutes per game
FG%	Field-goal percentage	3P%	3-point field-goal percentage	FT%	Free-throw percentage
RPG	Rebounds per game	APG	Assists per game	SPG	Steals per game
BPG	Blocks per game	PPG	Points per game	PIR	Performance index rating
**Bold**	Career high

=== Euroleague ===
Year	Team	GP	GS	MPG	FG%	3P%	FT%	RPG	APG	SPG	BPG	PPG	PIR
2011–12	Bilbao Basket	17	**6**	16.2	**.413**	.400	.706	0.9	0.9	0.4	**0.1**	6.0	3.4
2012–13	Lietuvos rytas	9	5	**19.8**	.309	.316	**.875**	**1.9**	**1.8**	**0.6**	**0.1**	**5.9**	**4.7**
2014–15	Panathinaikos	**27**	0	11.6	.410	**.424**	.714	0.7	0.5	0.2	0.0	3.8	1.6
Career		53	11	14.6	.384	.390	.744	1.0	0.8	0.3	0.0	4.8	2.7

== Trivia ==
Blūms has declared that his favorite players and idols growing were Roberts Štelmahers and Ainars Bagatskis. Coincidentally, he played with Štelmahers in the Latvian national basketball team and Lietuvos rytas (2006-07).

In 2010-11, Blūms was notable for not missing a single practice or a game with Bilbao Basket. He reported to training camp by mid-August, and his season ended in mid-June as his team Liga ACB finals.

== National team career ==
Blūms was an iconic figure for the Latvia national team, serving as the team's captain and making 170 appearances for the senior squad.

=== International stats ===
Tournament	Games played	Points per game	Rebounds per game	Assists per game
2005 EuroBasket	2	0.0	0.5	0.0
2007 EuroBasket	3	8.3	1.3	2.0
2009 EuroBasket	3	6.7	2.0	0.7
2011 EuroBasket	5	16.0	3.2	4.0
2013 EuroBasket	8	6.0	2.1	2.4
2015 Eurobasket	9	5.3	1.8	0.9
2017 Eurobasket	7	5.7	1.7	1.4
