= Quino Colom =

Spanish basketball player (born 1988)

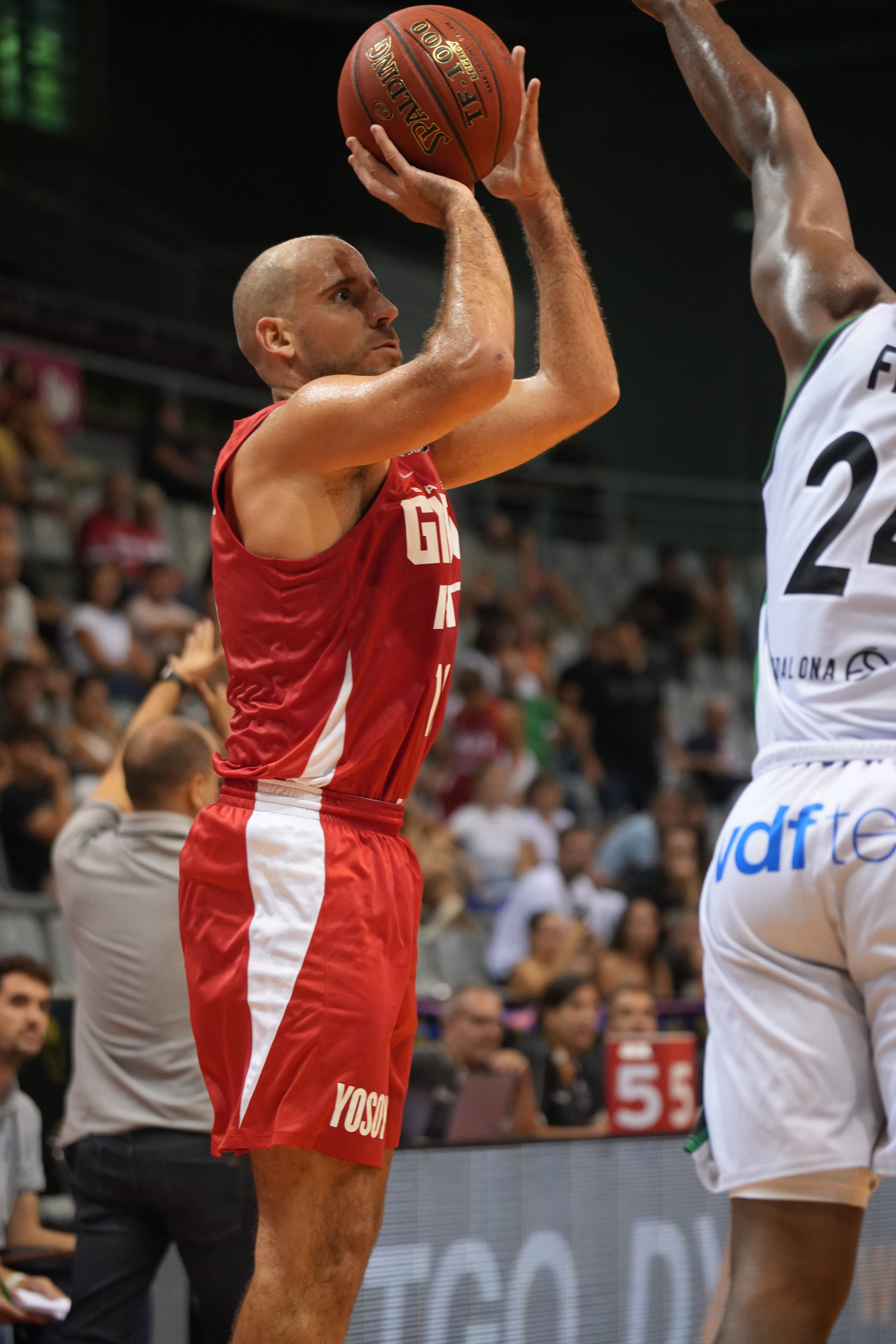
- Colom with Girona in 2023

Personal information
- Born: November 1, 1988 (age 38) Andorra la Vella, Andorra
- Listed height: 6 ft 2 in (1.88 m)
- Listed weight: 195 lb (88 kg)

Career information
- NBA draft: 2010: undrafted
- Playing career: 2006–2025
- Position: Point guard

Career history
- 2006–2007: CAI Zaragoza
- 2007–2008: L'Hospitalet
- 2008–2009: Lleida
- 2009: CAI Zaragoza
- 2009–2013: Fuenlabrada
- 2013–2014: Estudiantes
- 2014–2015: Bilbao Basket
- 2015–2018: UNICS Kazan
- 2018–2019: Bahçeşehir Koleji
- 2019–2020: Valencia
- 2020–2021: Crvena zvezda
- 2021: Saski Baskonia
- 2021–2022: AEK Athens
- 2022–2024: Bàsquet Girona

Career highlights
- All-EuroCup First Team (2018); EuroCup assists leader (2016); VTB United League Sixth Man of the Year (2016); VTB United League assists leader (2017)
Medals
Men's basketball
Representing Spain
World Cup
Gold medal – first place	2019 China
FIBA Europe Under-20 Championship
Bronze medal – third place	2008 Latvia	U20 Team
FIBA Europe Under-18 Championship
Bronze medal – third place	2006 Greece	U18 Team
Representing Andorra
Under-16 Promotion Cup
Gold medal – first place	2004 Andorra	U16 Team

Joaquim "Quino" Colom Barrufet (born November 1, 1988) is a Spanish-Andorran former professional basketball player. Among other teams, Colom played for Fuenlabrada, UNICS Kazan and Bàsquet Girona.

== Professional career ==
Colom played in the youth age categories with BC Andorra. He then played with Lleida Bàsquet, in the Spanish minor leagues, from 2003 to 2006. He made his debut with CAI Zaragoza in the 2006–07 season, and then played with CB L'Hospitalet in the 2007–08 season. He spent the 2008–09 season back with Lleida Bàsquet and had another brief stay with CAI Zaragoza in 2009.

On 8 July 2009, he signed with Fuenlabrada. On 31 July 2013, he parted ways with Fuenlabrada. Two days later, he signed a one-year deal with Estudiantes. On 20 August 2014, he signed a one-year deal with Bilbao Basket.

On 11 July 2015, he signed a one-year deal with UNICS Kazan of the VTB United League. On 18 May 2016, he was named the VTB United League 2015–16 season's VTB United League Sixth Man of the Year. On 12 June 2016, he re-signed with UNICS for two more seasons.

On July 14, 2019, Colom signed a two-year deal with Spanish club Valencia Basket. On 16 December 2020, he parted ways with Valencia and signed for Serbian club Crvena zvezda of the ABA League. He finished the 2020–21 season off by playing for Saski Baskonia.

On August 20, 2021, Colom signed with AEK Athens of the Greek Basket League and the Basketball Champions League. In 26 league games, he averaged 13 points, 3.6 rebounds, 6.3 assists and 0.5 steals, playing around 31 minutes per contest. On July 10, 2022, Colom parted ways with the Greek club.

On July 11, 2022, Colom signed with Bàsquet Girona of the Liga ACB. Serving as the team's captain after Marc Gasol retired, Colom parted ways with Girona at the end of the 2023-24 season. It was Colom's 11th season in the Liga ACB.

On February 25, 2025, Colom announced his retirement from professional basketball at age 36.

== National team career ==
After playing an Under-16 Championship with Andorra in 2004, where he won the gold medal, Colom joined the junior national teams of Spain. With Spain's junior national teams, he played at the 2006 FIBA Europe Under-18 Championship, where he won a bronze medal, and at the 2007 FIBA Under-19 World Championship.

He also played at the 2008 FIBA Europe Under-20 Championship, where he was voted to the All-Tournament Team, and where he won a bronze medal.

Thanks to his good performances during the 2014–15 season with Bilbao Basket, Colom was pre-selected to play with the senior Spanish national team during their preparation phase for the EuroBasket 2015. However, he did not make the team's final 12 man roster that competed at the tournament.

Colom was part of the gold medal-winning Spanish squad for the 2019 FIBA World Cup in China.
