= E. J. Rowland =

American-born Bulgarian basketball player and coach

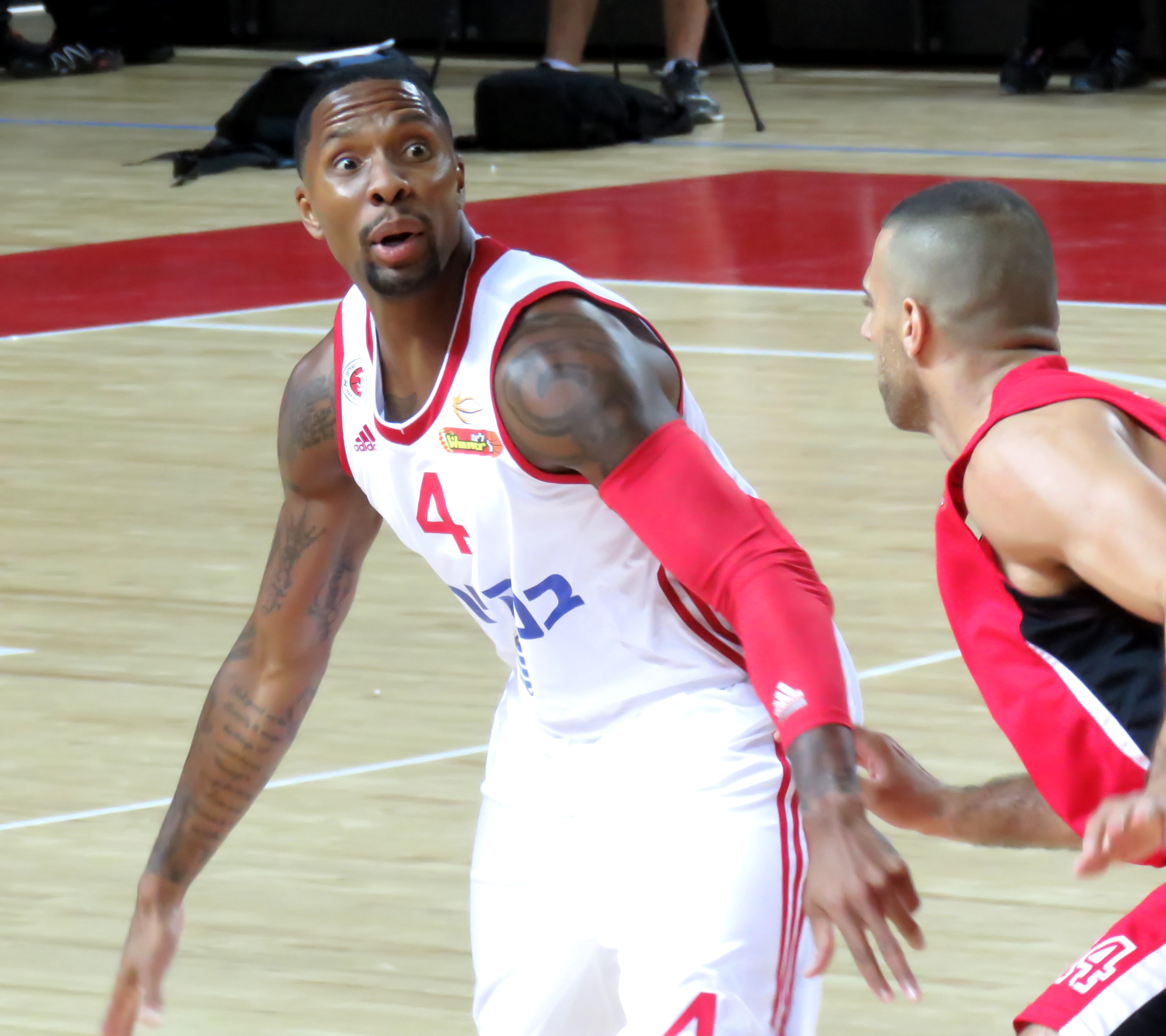
- Rowland with Hapoel Jerusalem in 2015

Arizona State Sun Devils
- Title: Assistant coach
- League: Big 12 Conference

Personal information
- Born: May 18, 1983 (age 43) Salinas, California, U.S.
- Listed height: 6 ft 3 in (1.91 m)
- Listed weight: 190 lb (86 kg)

Career information
- High school: Palma (Salinas, California)
- College: CSU Dominguez Hills (2001–2002); Hartnell (2002–2003); Saint Mary's (2003–2005)
- NBA draft: 2005: undrafted
- Playing career: 2005–2024
- Position: Point guard
- Number: 4
- Coaching career: 2024–present

Career history

Playing
- 2005–2006: Florida Flame
- 2006: Sydney Kings
- 2006–2007: Townsville Crocodiles
- 2007: Barons LMT
- 2007–2008: Artland Dragons
- 2008–2009: Telekom Baskets Bonn
- 2009–2011: Vanoli Cremona
- 2011–2012: Unicaja Málaga
- 2012–2013: VEF Rīga
- 2013–2015: Banvit
- 2015–2016: Hapoel Jerusalem
- 2016–2017: Khimki
- 2017–2018: Eskişehir Basket
- 2019–2020: Montakit Fuenlabrada
- 2021–2022: Chemidor B.C.
- 2022–2023: GTK Gliwice
- 2023–2024: JL Bourg

Coaching
- 2024–2026: Saint Mary's (assistant)
- 2026–present: Arizona State (assistant)

Career highlights
- VTB United League MVP (2013); VTB United League scoring champion (2013); VTB United League Hall of Fame (2019); German Cup winner (2008); Latvian League champion (2013); Latvian League Playoff MVP (2013)

Earl Jerrod "E. J." Rowland (born May 18, 1983) is an American-born Bulgarian basketball coach and former player who is currently an assistant coach at Arizona State under Randy Bennett.

== College career ==
Rowland began his college career with CSU Dominguez Hills. As a freshman with the Toros, he averaged 9.8 points, 4.6 rebounds, and 2.3 assists while starting 24 of 27 games. Following this season, he transferred to Hartnell College, a two-year community college in Salinas, California. In his only season with the team, he led the squad in points, assists, steals, and free-throw percentage en route to being named Coast Conference Player of the Year and earning All-State honors.

Rowland finished his college career with two years of NCAA basketball at St. Mary's (CA). He had two successful seasons with the Gaels, leading the team in assists in both his years there. Following his senior season, he earned honorable mention All-WCC.

== Professional career ==
Rowland began his professional career in the D-League with the Florida Flame. After seeing little action off the bench for the team, he spent the 2005–06 season with Barons LMT in Latvia. He then spent the 2006–07 season in the Australian NBL with the Sydney Kings but got released midseason. He then finished the season with the Townsville Crocodiles who eventually met Sydney in the Quarterfinals but lost 122–89. After he landing with Artland Dragons of the Basketball Bundesliga in 2007. In 2008–09, he averaged 13.6 points and 3.4 assists per game for Telekom Baskets Bonn. He helped the team to the finals of the Bundesliga for the second consecutive season. In July 2011 he signed a two-year deal with Unicaja Málaga in Spain. After unsuccessful season for himself and team, Unicaja decided to go another direction and loaned Rowland to Latvian champions VEF Rīga.

In Latvia E.J. had a break-out year leading his team to a great season, while Rowland got multiple individual awards. After such season Rowland moved to Turkey, signing lucrative deal with Banvit.

On January 7, 2015, in a EuroCup away game against Budućnost Podgorica, he was involved in an on-court incident. With two minutes of game time remaining, a hooligan ran onto the court, in order to hit Sammy Mejía of Banvit, after which Rowland punched the hooligan fan in retaliation. After the brawl, the referees ejected him from the court. He was fined by Euroleague Basketball (which organizes the EuroCup) for taking part in the incident, with a 30,000 euros fine.

On August 12, 2015, Rowland signed a one-year deal with the Israeli club Hapoel Jerusalem.

On August 23, 2016, Rowland signed with Russian club Khimki for the 2016–17 season.

On July 17, 2017, Rowland signed with Turkish club Eskişehir Basket for the 2017–18 season.

On February 1, 2019, he has signed with Montakit Fuenlabrada of Spanish Liga ACB.

On March 1, 2021, Rowland signed with Chemidor B.C. of the Iranian Basketball Super League.

On October 17, 2022, he has signed with GTK Gliwice of the Polish Basketball League (PLK).

== National team career ==
Rowland was invited to try out for the one naturalized player spot on the senior Bulgarian national basketball team for EuroBasket 2009. He beat out Andre Owens for the naturalized spot on the roster. With the national team, he led all players at EuroBasket 2009 in minutes played, while averaging 17.7 points per game. Despite his efforts, the Bulgarians finished 0–3 and were eliminated in the group stage.

== The Basketball Tournament ==
E.J. Rowland played for Team Challenge ALS in the 2018 edition of The Basketball Tournament. In four games, he averaged 6.8 points per game and 2.8 rebounds per game on 39 percent shooting. Team Challenge ALS made it to the West Regional Championship Game before falling to eventual tournament runner-up Eberlein Drive.

== Coaching career ==
After the conclusion of his playing career, Rowland returned to Saint Mary's College as an assistant coach in 2024. On March 29, 2026, Rowland was named an assistant coach at Arizona State.

== Personal life ==
E.J. Rowland develops his personal project through his brand GRRR in collaboration with a few close friends and fellow athletes.
