= 2013–14 VTB United League =

VTB United League
- Season: 2013–14
- Teams: 20

Regular season
- Top seed: Khimki
- Season MVP: (United States) Andrew Goudelock

Finals
- Champions: (Russia) CSKA Moscow (5th VTB League title ) (21st Russian national title)
- Runners-up: (Russia) Nizhny Novgorod
- Playoffs MVP: (Serbia) Miloš Teodosić

Awards
- Coach of the Year: (Lithuania) Rimas Kurtinaitis
- Defensive Player: (Russia) Sasha Kaun
- Sixth Man: (United States) James Augustine
- Young Player(s): (Russia) Dmitry Kulagin (Lithuania) Edgaras Ulanovas

Statistical leaders
Points	(United States) Cory Higgins	21.5
Rebounds	(United States Virgin Islands) Frank Elegar	8.4
Assists	(Kazakhstan) Jerry Johnson	7.5

The 2013–14 VTB United League was the fifth complete season of the VTB United League. The tournament featured 20 teams, from 10 countries during the season, 2 more teams than the previous year. It was the first season the VTB United League that functioned as the new domestic first tier level for Russian basketball clubs.

CSKA Moscow won their 5th VTB United League title, and their 21st Russian national championship.

== Participants ==
Country (League)	Teams
Belarus (BPL)	Tsmoki-Minsk
Czech Republic (NBL)	ČEZ Basketball Nymburk
Estonia (KML)	Kalev/Cramo
Kazakhstan (Division 1)	Astana
Latvia (LBL)	VEF Rīga
Lithuania (LKL)	Lietuvos Rytas Vilnius
Lithuania (LKL)	Neptūnas Klaipėda
Poland (PLK)	Turów Zgorzelec
Russia (PBL)	CSKA Moscow
Russia (PBL)	Enisey Krasnoyarsk
Russia (PBL)	Khimki Moscow Region
Russia (PBL)	Krasnye Krylya Samara
Russia (PBL)	BC Krasny Oktyabr
Russia (PBL)	Lokomotiv Kuban Krasnodar
Russia (PBL)	Nizhny Novgorod
Russia (PBL)	Spartak Saint Petersburg
Russia (PBL)	Triumph Lyubertsy
Russia (PBL)	UNICS Kazan
Ukraine (SuperLeague)	Azovmash Mariupol
Ukraine (SuperLeague)	Donetsk

== Regular season ==
=== Group A ===
Pos	Team	Pld	W	L	PF	PA	PD	Qualification or relegation
1	(Russia) Unics Kazan	18	17	1	1371	1132	+239	Qualified for Quarterfinals
2	(Lithuania) Lietuvos Rytas	18	13	5	1456	1355	+101	Qualified for Quarterfinals
3	(Russia) Lokomotiv Kuban	18	12	6	1330	1271	+59	Qualified for Round of 16
4	(Russia) Nizhny Novgorod	18	11	7	1380	1276	+104	Qualified for Round of 16
5	(Russia) Enisey Krasnoyarsk	18	9	9	1560	1579	−19	Qualified for Round of 16
6	(Russia) Spartak St. Petersburg	18	7	11	1298	1365	−67	Qualified for Round of 16
7	(Poland) Turów Zgorzelec	18	6	12	1443	1525	−82	
8	(Czech Republic) ČEZ Nymburk	18	5	13	1430	1521	−91	
9	(Ukraine) Donetsk (Note: Team withdrawing from the tournament due to annexation of Crimea by the Russian Federation.)	18	8	10	1229	1286	−57	
10	(Estonia) Kalev/Cramo	18	2	16	1369	1556	−187	

=== Group B ===
Pos	Team	Pld	W	L	PF	PA	PD	Qualification or relegation
1	(Russia) BC Khimki	18	18	0	1567	1249	+318	Qualified for Quarterfinals
2	(Russia) CSKA Moscow	18	16	2	1468	1223	+245	Qualified for Quarterfinals
3	(Russia) BC Triumph Lyubertsy	18	11	7	1401	1394	+7	Qualified for Round of 16
4	(Russia) Krasnye Krylia	18	9	9	1371	1394	−23	Qualified for Round of 16
5	(Kazakhstan) Astana	18	8	10	1498	1527	−29	Qualified for Round of 16
6	(Russia) Krasny Oktyabr	18	8	10	1504	1591	−87	Qualified for Round of 16
7	(Latvia) VEF Rīga	18	7	11	1398	1430	−32	
8	(Lithuania) Neptūnas Klaipėda	18	5	13	1406	1525	−119	
9	(Belarus) Tsmoki Minsk	18	4	14	1398	1502	−104	
10	(Ukraine) Azovmash Mariupol	18	4	14	1314	1480	−166	

== Playoffs ==
=== Bracket ===
Round of 16
(Russia) Krasnye Krylia	81	101
(Russia) Enisey Krasnoyarsk	78	90
(Russia) Lokomotiv Kuban	91	89
(Russia) Krasny Oktyabr	85	73
(Russia) Nizhny Novgorod	71	76
(Kazakhstan) Astana	58	68
(Russia) Triumph Lyubertsy	57	74	66
(Russia) Spartak St.Petersburg	74	57	59

Quarter-finals
(Russia) Unics Kazan	85	86	93
(Russia) Krasnye Krylia	63	74	77
(Russia) CSKA Moscow	83	66	76	79	84
(Russia) Lokomotiv Kuban	87	81	73	78	65
(Russia) Khimki	76	70	64
(Russia) Nizhny Novgorod	78	76	84
(Lithuania) Lietuvos rytas	80	96	97
(Russia) Triumph Lyubertsy	69	94	87

Semi-finals
(Russia) Unics Kazan	90	61	86
(Russia) CSKA Moscow	92	65	92
(Russia) Nizhny Novgorod	87	75	80	84
(Lithuania) Lietuvos rytas	81	78	69	78

Final
(Russia) CSKA Moscow	65	86	82
(Russia) Nizhny Novgorod	54	59	66

== Awards ==
=== Major awards ===
- Most Valuable Player: (United States) Andrew Goudelock (UNICS Kazan)
- Playoffs MVP: (Serbia) Miloš Teodosić (CSKA Moscow)
- Coach of the Year: (Lithuania) Rimas Kurtinaitis (Khimki)
- Sixth Man of the Year: (United States) James Augustine (Khimki)
- Defensive Player of the Year: (Russia) Sasha Kaun (CSKA Moscow)
- Young Player of the Year: (Russia) Dmitry Kulagin (Triump Lyubertsy) & (Lithuania) Edgaras Ulanovas (Neptūnas)

=== All-Tournament First Team ===
- (United States) Andrew Goudelock (UNICS Kazan)
- (United States) Willie Deane (Krasny Oktyabr)
- (United States) Derrick Brown (Lokomotiv Kuban)
- (United States) James Augustine (Khimki)
- (Russia) Sasha Kaun (CSKA Moscow)

=== All-Tournament Second Team ===
- (Serbia) Miloš Teodosić (CSKA Moscow)
- (Lithuania) Martynas Gecevičius (Lietuvos Rytas)
- (United States) Alex Renfroe (Enisey)
- (Russia) Sergei Monia (Khimki)
- (Poland) Damian Kulig (Turów Zgorzelec)

=== Nationality awards ===
For the second season in a row, awards were handed out to the best player by nationality.

Nationality	Player	Team	Ref.
(Ukraine) Ukrainian	Kyrylo Natyazhko	(Ukraine) Azovmash	
(Estonia) Estonian	Rain Veideman	(Estonia) Kalev/Cramo	
(Poland) Polish	Damian Kulig	(Poland) Turów Zgorzelec	
(Czech Republic) Czech	Vojtěch Hruban	(Czech Republic) CEZ Nymburk	
(Latvia) Latvian	Jānis Blūms	(Kazakhstan) Astana	
(Kazakhstan) Kazakh	Anatoliy Kolesnikov	(Kazakhstan) Astana	
(Belarus) Belarusian	Vladimir Veremeenko	(Russia) Unics Kazan	
(Russia) Russian	Semen Antonov	(Russia) Nizhny Novgorod	
Lithuania	Martynas Gecevičius	(Lithuania) Lietuvos Rytas	

=== Monthly MVP ===
Month	Player	Team	Ref.
October	(Russia) Sasha Kaun	(Russia) CSKA Moscow	
November	(United States) Cory Higgins	(Russia) Triumph Lyubertsy	
December	(United States) Alex Renfroe	(Russia) Enisey Krasnoyarsk	
January	(United States) James Augustine	(Russia) Khimki	
February	(United States) Andrew Goudelock	(Russia) Unics Kazan	
March	(Bulgaria) Willie Deane	(Russia) Krasny Oktyabr	

== Statistical leaders ==
- Scoring: (United States) Cory Higgins, Triumph Lyubertsy (21.5)
- Rebounds: (United States Virgin Islands) Frank Elegar, Kalev/Cramo (8.4)
- Assists: (Kazakhstan) Jerry Johnson, Astana (7.5)
- Steals: (United States Virgin Islands) Cuthbert Victor, Krasny Oktyabr (1.9)
- Blocks: (Nigeria) Shane Lawal, Astana (2.1)
