= Alexey Shved =

Russian basketball player (born 1988)

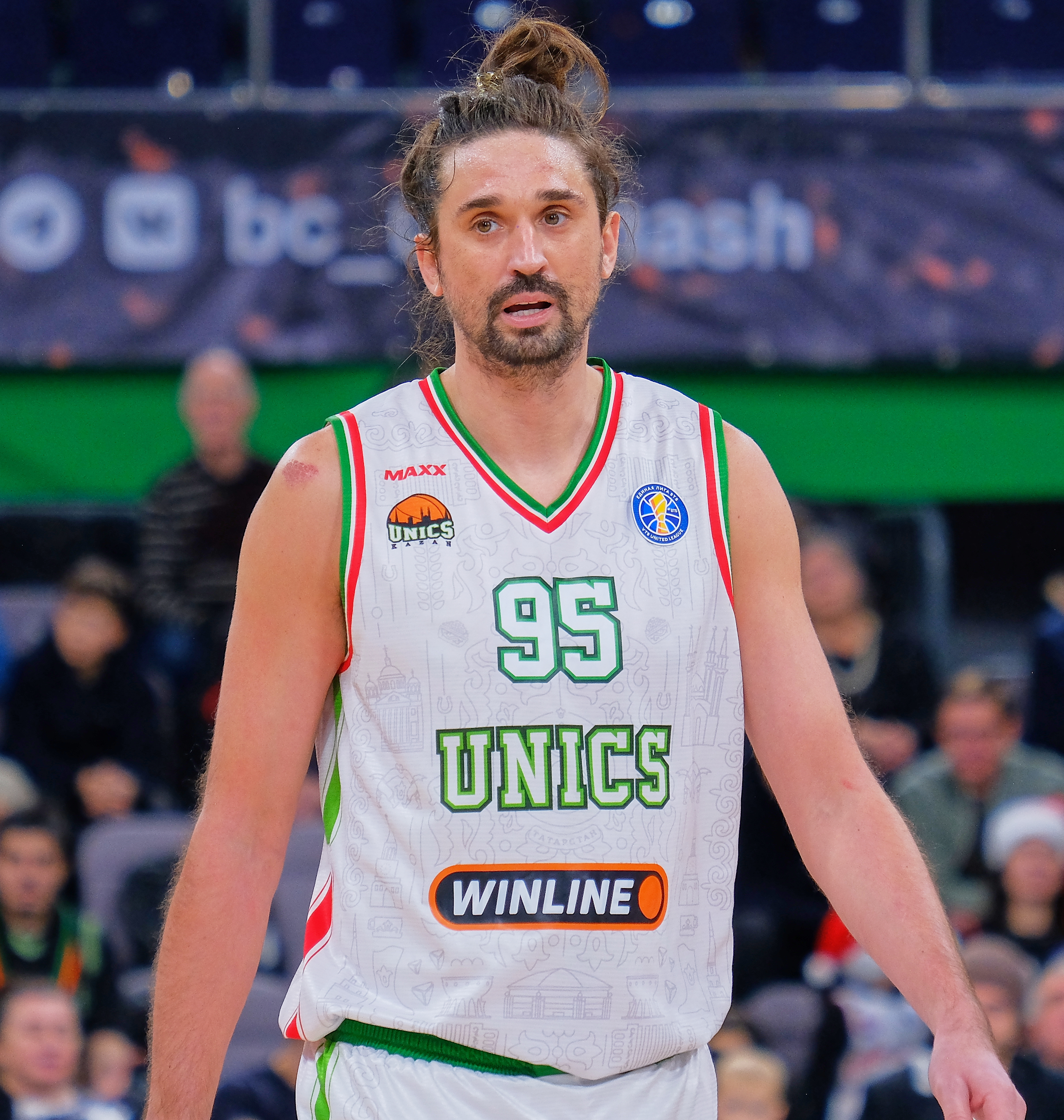
- Shved with UNICS Kazan in 2025

No. 95 – UNICS Kazan
- Position: Shooting guard / point guard
- League: VTB United League

Personal information
- Born: December 16, 1988 (age 37) Belgorod, Russian SFSR, Soviet Union
- Listed height: 1.98 m (6 ft 6 in)
- Listed weight: 86 kg (190 lb)

Career information
- NBA draft: 2010: undrafted
- Playing career: 2006–present

Career history
- 2006–2012: CSKA Moscow
- 2007: →Khimki Moscow
- 2009–2010: →Dynamo Moscow
- 2012–2014: Minnesota Timberwolves
- 2014: Philadelphia 76ers
- 2014–2015: Houston Rockets
- 2015: New York Knicks
- 2015–2021: Khimki Moscow
- 2021–2023: CSKA Moscow
- 2023–2024: Shanxi Loongs
- 2025: Zenit Saint Petersburg
- 2025–present: UNICS Kazan

Career highlights
- EuroLeague champion (2008); 2× Alphonso Ford EuroLeague Top Scorer Trophy (2018, 2021); All-EuroLeague Second Team (2018); EuroLeague assists leader (2021); EuroCup MVP (2017); All-EuroCup First Team (2017); EuroCup Top Scorer (2017); 2× VTB United League champion (2008, 2012); VTB United League MVP (2017); VTB United League Supercup champion (2021); 2× VTB United League Top Scorer (2018, 2019); VTB United League assists leader (2020); 6× All-VTB United League First Team (2016–2019, 2022); 2× All-VTB United League Second Team (2021, 2023); 4× Russian League champion (2008, 2009, 2011, 2012); Russian League Playoffs MVP (2012); All-Russian League Team (2012); Best Russian Young Player (2008)
- Stats at NBA.com
- Stats at Basketball Reference

Alexey Viktorovich Shved (Russian: Алексей Викторович Швед; born December 16, 1988) is a Russian professional basketball player for UNICS Kazan of the VTB United League. Standing at 1.98 m (6 ft 6 in), he plays at both the shooting guard and point guard positions.

After helping lead CSKA Moscow to the EuroLeague final in 2012, Shved spent three years in the NBA, before returning to Europe and earning an All-EuroLeague Second Team selection in 2018. As a member of the Russian national team, he won the bronze medal at the 2012 Summer Olympics, as well as a bronze medal at EuroBasket 2011.

== Professional career ==
=== CSKA Moscow (2006–2012) ===
Shved began his professional career with CSKA Moscow in a Russian Super League game, against Ural Great Perm, on November 4, 2006. He made his EuroLeague debut in a game against Žalgiris, on January 17, 2007. In February 2007, he joined Khimki Moscow Region, on loan from CSKA Moscow. He then returned to CSKA Moscow before the start of the 2007–08 season. In December 2009, he moved to Dynamo Moscow, on loan from CSKA Moscow. He moved back to CSKA Moscow before the start of the 2010–11 season. The following season, he reached the EuroLeague Final with the Reds.

=== Minnesota Timberwolves (2012–2014) ===
On July 23, 2012, CSKA Moscow announced the departure of Shved in order to sign with the Minnesota Timberwolves of the NBA. Two days later, he signed a multi-year deal with the Timberwolves.

=== Philadelphia 76ers (2014) ===
On August 23, 2014, a three-team trade was completed, involving the Timberwolves, the Cleveland Cavaliers, and the Philadelphia 76ers. As part of the deal, Shved and teammate Luc Mbah a Moute were traded to the Sixers, along with a 2015 first round draft pick from Cleveland. The Cavaliers received Kevin Love from Minnesota, whereas the Wolves received Andrew Wiggins and Anthony Bennett from Cleveland and Thaddeus Young from Philadelphia.

=== Houston Rockets (2014–2015) ===
On December 19, 2014, Shved was acquired by the Houston Rockets in a three-team trade that also involved the 76ers and the Minnesota Timberwolves.

=== New York Knicks (2015) ===
On February 19, 2015, Shved was traded, along with two second-round picks, to the New York Knicks in exchange for Pablo Prigioni.

=== Khimki (2015–2021) ===
On July 16, 2015, Shved returned to Russia, and signed a three-year contract with Khimki. The contract was worth $10.2 million net income over three years. On March 27, 2017, Shved was named the European-wide second tier level EuroCup's season MVP. He was the first player in EuroCup history to average at least 22 points, 5 assists, and 4 rebounds per game in the same season. Shved was awarded the VTB United League MVP award for the 2016–17 season.

In July 2017, Shved extended his contract with Khimki, through the 2019–20 season. In 2017–18 season, Khimki made it to the 2018 EuroLeague Playoffs quarterfinals, where they were eliminated by CSKA Moscow, with 3–1 series result. Over the season, Shved led the EuroLeague in scoring, with a career-high 21.8 points per game, which earned him the Alphonso Ford EuroLeague Top Scorer Trophy. In May 2018, he was named the All-EuroLeague Second Team for the 2017–18 season.

=== Return to CSKA Moscow (2021–2023) ===
On August 12, 2021, Shved officially returned to CSKA Moscow of the VTB United League, and of the EuroLeague until it was suspended due to the 2022 Russian invasion of Ukraine, signing a two-year (1+1) deal. On August 4, 2023, Shved parted ways with the Russian powerhouse.

=== Shanxi Loongs (2023–2024) ===
In October 2023, Shved signed with Shanxi Loongs of the Chinese Basketball Association. In October 2024, Shved re-signed with Shanxi Loongs, replacing Ibrahima Fall Faye. On December 7, Shved was removed from roster, replacing by Ibrahima Fall Faye, Shved didn't part ways with Shanxi Loongs. On December 24, his agent confirmed Shved became a free agent.

=== Zenit Saint Petersburg (2025) ===
On January 18, 2025, Shved signed with Zenit Saint Petersburg.

=== UNICS Kazan (2025–present) ===
On November 4, 2025, Shved signed with UNICS Kazan.

== National team career ==
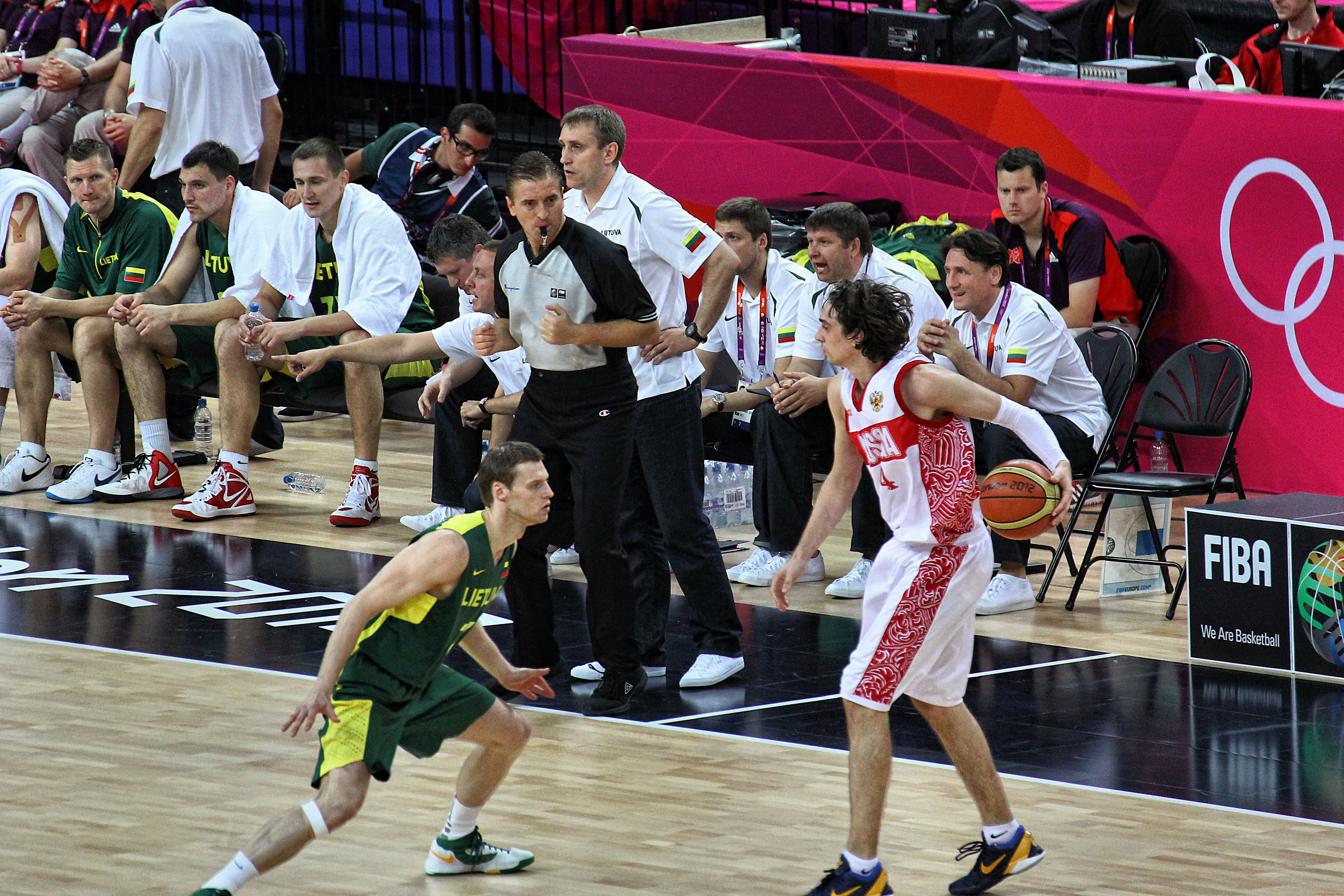
Alexey Shved (right) in a game between Lithuania and Russia

Shved played with the Russian junior national teams. He played at the 2006 FIBA Europe Under-18 Championship, and at the 2007 and 2008 FIBA Europe Under-20 Championships. Shved has also been a member of the senior men's Russian national basketball team. He won the bronze medal at the EuroBasket 2011. At the 2012 Summer Olympics, on August 12, 2012, Shved scored 25 points, to lead the Russian national team to an 81–77 victory, over Argentina, in the bronze medal game.

He also played with Russia at the EuroBasket 2013, and at the EuroBasket 2017, where he led all scorers and was named in the All-Tournament Team.

== Career statistics ==
Legend
GP	Games played	GS	Games started	MPG	Minutes per game
FG%	Field-goal percentage	3P%	3-point field-goal percentage	FT%	Free-throw percentage
RPG	Rebounds per game	APG	Assists per game	SPG	Steals per game
BPG	Blocks per game	PPG	Points per game	PIR	Performance index rating
**Bold**	Career high

=== NBA ===
==== Regular season ====
Year	Team	GP	GS	MPG	FG%	3P%	FT%	RPG	APG	SPG	BPG	PPG
2012–13	Minnesota	**77**	**16**	23.9	.372	.295	.720	2.3	**3.7**	.7	**.4**	8.6
2013–14	Minnesota	63	0	10.5	.321	.294	.756	1.3	1.1	.4	.3	4.0
2014–15	Philadelphia	17	0	16.8	.400	.298	**.842**	1.3	2.7	.8	.1	9.9
2014–15	Houston	9	0	6.6	.333	.333	.818	.4	.3	.1	.0	3.2
2014–15	New York	16	9	**26.4**	**.403**	**.371**	.780	**4.6**	3.6	**.9**	.3	**14.8**
Career		182	25	18	.369	.306	.762	2.0	2.5	.6	.3	7.4

=== EuroLeague ===
†	Denotes season in which Shved won the EuroLeague
*	Led the league

Year	Team	GP	GS	MPG	FG%	3P%	FT%	RPG	APG	SPG	BPG	PPG	PIR
2006–07	CSKA Moscow	1	0	2.2	—	—	—	—	—	—	—	0.0	0.0
2007–08†	CSKA Moscow	8	0	4.1	.538	.500	.667	.3	—	.1	.1	2.8	2.1
2008–09	CSKA Moscow	3	0	3.2	—	**1.000**	**1.000**	.3	1.0	.3	—	2.3	5.0
2009–10	CSKA Moscow	2	0	1.9	.000	—	.500	.5	.5	—	—	0.5	1.0
2010–11	CSKA Moscow	7	1	12.3	.550	.444	.500	1.4	1.1	.3	.1	4.4	4.6
2011–12	CSKA Moscow	21	3	21.6	.487	.493	.833	2.6	3.0	.6	.2	10.6	11.0
2015–16	Khimki	24	18	26.6	.409	.348	.737	2.8	4.0	1.3	.3	15.9	14.5
2017–18	Khimki	**34**	**34**	32.2*	.407	.330	.820	2.6	5.2	1.3	.2	21.8*	20.4
2018–19	Khimki	14	14	32.0	.393	.365	.806	2.8	6.6	**1.6**	.3	**23.3**	**23.2**
2019–20	Khimki	26	26	31.2	.390	.329	.892	2.7	6.2	.9	**.4**	21.4	19.4
2020–21	Khimki	23	22	**32.5***	.386	.333	.899	**3.7**	**7.7***	1.3	**.4**	19.8*	19.6
2021–22	CSKA Moscow	24	22	25.0	.397	.325	.878	2.6	3.6	1.1	.4	11.0	10.0
Career		187	140	26.4	.406	.347	.835	2.6	4.6	1.0	.3	16.1	15.3
