= 2015–16 VTB United League =

VTB United League
- Season: 2015–16
- Duration: October 2015 – June 8, 2016
- Teams: 16

Regular season
- Top seed: CSKA Moscow
- Season MVP: (France) Nando de Colo

Finals
- Champions: (Russia) CSKA Moscow (7th VTB League title) (23rd Russian national title)
- Runners-up: (Russia) UNICS
- Playoffs MVP: (Serbia) Miloš Teodosić

Statistical leaders
| Points | (United States) Keith Langford | 21.0 |
| Rebounds | (United States) Josh Boone | 9.1 |
| Assists | (Mexico) Paul Stoll | 7.1 |

Records
- Winning streak: 13 games CSKA Moscow
- Losing streak: 16 games VITA Tbilisi

The 2015–16 VTB United League was the seventh complete season of the VTB United League. It was also the third season that the league functioned as the Russian domestic first tier level. CSKA Moscow was the defending champion, and the team successfully defended its title.

== Teams ==
Locations of teams from Russia in the 2015–16 VTB United League

Krasnye Krylia withdrew from the league as the Samara Sports Palace was not adequate for the VTB United League (such as a minimum requirement of 3,000 seats). It planned to reapply for the 2016–17 season after renovations.

In its place, Georgian Superliga side VITA Tbilisi was chosen in July 2015, the first side from that country to play in the league. All other clubs from the previous season were confirmed on the same occasion, along with a rough draft of a calendar.

=== Stadia and locations ===
| Team | City | Arena | Capacity |
|---|---|---|---|
| (Belarus) Tsmoki Minsk | Minsk | Minsk Arena | 15,000 |
| (Czech Republic) ČEZ Nymburk | Nymburk | Tipsport Arena | 11,650 |
| (Estonia) Kalev | Tallinn | Saku Suurhall Arena | 7,000 |
| (Finland) Bisons Loimaa | Loimaa | Energia Areena | 3,500 |
| (Georgia (country)) VITA Tbilisi ◆ | Tbilisi | Tbilisi Sports Palace | 9,700 |
| (Kazakhstan) Astana | Astana | Saryarka Velodrome | 10,000 |
| (Latvia) VEF Rīga | Rīga | Arēna Rīga | 12,500 |
| (Russia) Avtodor Saratov | Saratov | Kristall Ice Sports Palace | 6,100 |
| (Russia) CSKA Moscow ● | Moscow | Universal Sports Hall CSKA | 5,500 |
| (Russia) Enisey Krasnoyarsk | Krasnoyarsk | Ivan Yarygin Sports Palace | 4,100 |
| (Russia) Khimki | Khimki | Basketball Center | 4,000 |
| (Russia) Krasny Oktyabr | Volgograd | Volgograd Sports Palace of Trade Unions | 3,700 |
| (Russia) Lokomotiv Kuban | Krasnodar | Basket-Hall | 7,500 |
| (Russia) Nizhny Novgorod | Nizhny Novgorod | Trade Union Sport Palace | 5,600 |
| (Russia) UNICS | Kazan | Basket Hall Arena | 7,500 |
| (Russia) Zenit | Saint Petersburg | Sibur Arena | 7,044 |

Notes

◆ Team makes its debut in the VTB United League.
● The defending champions, winners of the 2014–15 VTB United League.

== Regular season ==
=== Standings ===
| Pos | Team | Pld | W | L | PF | PA | PD | Qualification or relegation |
|---|---|---|---|---|---|---|---|---|
| 1 | (Russia) CSKA Moscow | 30 | 28 | 2 | 2856 | 2230 | +626 | Qualification to playoffs |
| 2 | (Russia) UNICS | 30 | 25 | 5 | 2666 | 2293 | +373 | Qualification to playoffs |
| 3 | (Russia) Zenit Saint Petersburg | 30 | 23 | 7 | 2668 | 2374 | +294 | Qualification to playoffs |
| 4 | (Russia) Khimki | 30 | 22 | 8 | 2866 | 2443 | +423 | Qualification to playoffs |
| 5 | (Russia) Lokomotiv Kuban | 30 | 22 | 8 | 2480 | 2153 | +327 | Qualification to playoffs |
| 6 | (Russia) Avtodor Saratov | 30 | 20 | 10 | 2661 | 2409 | +252 | Qualification to playoffs |
| 7 | (Russia) Nizhny Novgorod | 30 | 17 | 13 | 2523 | 2516 | +7 | Qualification to playoffs |
| 8 | (Czech Republic) ČEZ Nymburk | 30 | 16 | 14 | 2526 | 2415 | +111 | Qualification to playoffs |
| 9 | (Russia) Krasny Oktyabr | 30 | 12 | 18 | 2567 | 2637 | −70 | |
| 10 | (Russia) Enisey | 30 | 11 | 19 | 2509 | 2596 | −87 | |
| 11 | (Latvia) VEF Rīga | 30 | 11 | 19 | 2473 | 2517 | −44 | |
| 12 | (Belarus) Tsmoki-Minsk | 30 | 9 | 21 | 2416 | 2605 | −189 | |
| 13 | (Finland) Nilan Bisons | 30 | 8 | 22 | 2242 | 2704 | −462 | |
| 14 | (Estonia) Kalev/Cramo | 30 | 8 | 22 | 2311 | 2596 | −285 | |
| 15 | (Kazakhstan) Astana | 30 | 7 | 23 | 2375 | 2799 | −424 | |
| 16 | (Georgia (country)) VITA Tbilisi | 30 | 1 | 29 | 1939 | 2791 | −852 | |

Source: VTB Standings

=== Results ===
| Home \ Away | AST | AVT | ČEZ | CSK | ENI | KAL | KHI | KRA | LOK | NIL | NIZ | TSM | UNK | VEF | VIT | ZEN |
|---|---|---|---|---|---|---|---|---|---|---|---|---|---|---|---|---|
| (Kazakhstan) Astana | | 93–131 | 63–98 | 60–92 | 73–80 | 97–91 | 74–108 | 81–74 | 89–91 | 83–80 | 101–79 | 92–93 | 90–103 | 71–89 | 118–61 | 71–93 |
| (Russia) Avtodor Saratov | 132–72 | | 92–84 | 72–91 | 90–84 | 68–60 | 87–84 | 102–95 | 70–79 | 85–75 | 94–86 | 98–85 | 70–97 | 86–74 | 20–0 | 90–88 |
| (Czech Republic) ČEZ Nymburk | 79–61 | 73–92 | | 66–86 | 91–81 | 79–65 | 90–94 | 103–76 | 76–74 | 87–59 | 76–70 | 75–61 | 74–75 | 73–71 | 111–51 | 81–102 |
| (Russia) CSKA Moscow | 102–67 | 101–90 | 119–68 | | 94–64 | 100–67 | 100–93 | 85–67 | 88–94 | 99–67 | 98–65 | 92–48 | 81–70 | 101–93 | 98–62 | 113–77 |
| (Russia) Enisey Krasnoyarsk | 96–70 | 88–92 | 88–92 | 81–96 | | 97–90 | 85–95 | 86–94 | 73–82 | 88–64 | 103–96 | 93–94 | 83–87 | 110–65 | 83–73 | 94–102 |
| (Estonia) Kalev/Cramo | 80–86 | 75–86 | 70–99 | 78–105 | 80–70 | | 72–90 | 89–81 | 71–89 | 83–78 | 77–91 | 81–73 | 84–89 | 78–86 | 85–75 | 84–92 |
| (Russia) Khimki | 128–87 | 87–84 | 123–71 | 85–96 | 108–92 | 84–54 | | 97–86 | 101–88 | 113–83 | 74–82 | 100–72 | 85–90 | 104–93 | 117–73 | 90–84 |
| (Russia) Krasny Oktyabr | 106–85 | 85–102 | 96–88 | 74–108 | 92–66 | 83–95 | 78–80 | | 77–89 | 78–83 | 93–87 | 96–80 | 80–114 | 88–94 | 85–82 | 67–74 |
| (Russia) Lokomotiv Kuban | 99–66 | 91–77 | 75–58 | 65–77 | 77–51 | 71–67 | 94–81 | 81–63 | | 95–55 | 92–69 | 80–50 | 56–58 | 71–63 | 121–71 | 78–70 |
| (Finland) Nilan Bisons | 81–75 | 86–135 | 60–96 | 82–98 | 99–110 | 98–86 | 62–81 | 72–109 | 70–68 | | 73–79 | 76–73 | 74–93 | 83–82 | 89–73 | 62–83 |
| (Russia) Nizhny Novgorod | 84–80 | 75–70 | 91–76 | 86–82 | 93–75 | 80–66 | 93–92 | 87–90 | 96–91 | 71–69 | | 100–85 | 91–81 | 79–107 | 97–65 | 84–88 |
| (Belarus) Tsmoki-Minsk | 87–83 | 83–106 | 84–93 | 81–83 | 89–91 | 100–77 | 88–94 | 77–81 | 60–75 | 119–83 | 86–81 | | 77–102 | 74–75 | 94–74 | 71–79 |
| (Russia) UNICS Kazan | 100–73 | 66–64 | 94–87 | 89–100 | 94–75 | 96–75 | 82–78 | 97–76 | 80–76 | 110–56 | 102–68 | 83–91 | | 82–72 | 81–57 | 101–66 |
| (Latvia) VEF Rīga | 94–93 | 103–91 | 81–73 | 77–92 | 71–73 | 75–84 | 79–89 | 92–94 | 84–89 | 83–73 | 75–87 | 76–84 | 69–81 | | 99–59 | 76–95 |
| (Georgia (country)) VITA Tbilisi | 53–62 | 59–111 | 59–119 | 60–93 | 72–85 | 77–78 | 52–108 | 67–110 | 63–76 | 63–77 | 78–100 | 81–80 | 76–104 | 69–99 | | 84–90 |
| (Russia) Zenit St.Petersburg | 115–59 | 90–74 | 102–90 | 82–86 | 81–64 | 101–69 | 72–103 | 94–93 | 79–73 | 106–73 | 77–76 | 105–77 | 89–65 | 91–76 | 101–50 | |

Legend: Blue = home team win; Red = away team win.

== Playoffs ==
The eight teams that finished highest in the regular season were qualified. The Playoffs started on April 29 and ended on June 8, 2016. The champions or runners-up of the Playoffs would qualify for the 2016–17 EuroLeague, dependent on the position of automatically placed CSKA Moscow. CSKA Moscow won the championship, after beating runners-up UNICS that qualified for the EuroLeague as runners-up.

=== Bracket ===
Quarterfinals
1 | (Russia) CSKA Moscow | 3
8 | (Czech Republic) ČEZ Nymburk | 0
4 | (Russia) Khimki | 3
5 | (Russia) Lokomotiv Kuban | 0
2 | (Russia) UNICS | 3
7 | (Russia) Nizhny Novgorod | 0
3 | (Russia) Zenit St. Petersburg | 3
6 | (Russia) Avtodor Saratov | 0

Semifinals
1 | (Russia) CSKA Moscow | 3
4 | (Russia) Khimki | 0
2 | (Russia) UNICS | 3
3 | (Russia) Zenit St. Petersburg | 2

Finals
1 | (Russia) CSKA Moscow | 3
2 | (Russia) UNICS | 1

=== Quarterfinals ===
In the quarterfinals, teams play against each other which must win three games to win the series. Thus, if one team win three games before all five games have been played, the game that remain are omitted. The team that finished in the higher Regular season place will be played the first, third and fifth (if it is necessary) game of the series at home.

| Team 1 | Agg. | Team 2 | Game 1 | Game 2 | Game 3 | Game 4 | Game 5 |
|---|---|---|---|---|---|---|---|
| CSKA Moscow (Russia) | 3–0 | (Czech Republic) ČEZ Nymburk | 95–87 | 79–72 | 102–87 | | |
| Khimki (Russia) | 3–0 | (Russia) Lokomotiv Kuban | 86–80 | 97–83 | 86–71 | | |
| UNICS (Russia) | 3–0 | (Russia) Nizhny Novgorod | 83–70 | 70–61 | 84–71 | | |
| Zenit St. Petersburg (Russia) | 3–0 | (Russia) Avtodor Saratov | 95–91 | 97–85 | 95–82 | | |

=== Semifinals ===
In the semifinals, teams play against each other which must win three games to win the series. Thus, if one team win three games before all five games have been played, the game that remain are omitted. The team that finished in the higher Regular season place will be played the first, third and fifth (if it is necessary) game of the series at home.

| Team 1 | Agg. | Team 2 | Game 1 | Game 2 | Game 3 | Game 4 | Game 5 |
|---|---|---|---|---|---|---|---|
| CSKA Moscow (Russia) | 3–0 | (Russia) Khimki | 86–83 | 99–87 | 95–92 | | |
| UNICS (Russia) | 3–2 | (Russia) Zenit St. Petersburg | 94–93 | 97–91 | 67–82 | 82–85 | 79–70 |

=== Finals ===
In the Finals, teams play against each other which must win three games to win the series. Thus, if one team win three games before all five games have been played, the game that remain are omitted. The team that finished in the higher Regular season place will be played the first, third and fifth (if it is necessary) game of the series at home.

| Team 1 | Agg. | Team 2 | Game 1 | Game 2 | Game 3 | Game 4 | Game 5 |
|---|---|---|---|---|---|---|---|
| CSKA Moscow (Russia) | 3–1 | (Russia) UNICS | 84–76 | 90–77 | 74–79 | 81–74 | – |

| June 1, 2016 | CSKA Moscow (Russia) | 84–76 (Series: 1–0) | (Russia) UNICS | Moscow |
| 19:00 | Scoring by quarter: 24–15, 22–26, 27–18, 11–17 |
| | Pts: Teodosic 17; Rebs: De Colo 6 Asts: Teodosic 10 | Boxscore | Pts: Langford 16; Rebs: Parakhouski 7 Asts: Colom 7 | Arena: USK CSKA; Attendance: 4,050; Referees: Sreten Radovic, Saso Petek, Semen Ovinov |

| June 3, 2016 | CSKA Moscow (Russia) | 90–77 (Series: 2–0) | (Russia) UNICS | Moscow |
| 19:30 | Scoring by quarter: 27–23, 22–17, 16–22, 25–15 |
| | Pts: Khryapa 19; Rebs: Khryapa 6 Asts: Teodosic 7 | Boxscore | Pts: Langford 15; Rebs: Williams 6 Asts: Ponkrashov 7 | Arena: USK CSKA; Attendance: 4,600; Referees: Sasa Pukl, Oskars Lucius, Ilya Putenko |

| June 6, 2016 | UNICS (Russia) | 79–74 (Series: 1–2) | (Russia) CSKA Moscow | Kazan |
| 19:30 | Scoring by quarter: 18–18, 23–22, 24–14, 14–20 |
| | Pts: Langford 29; Rebs: Langford 8 Asts: Langford 4 | Boxscore | Pts: De Colo 20; Rebs: Hines 11; Asts: Teodosic 7 | Arena: Basket-Hall Kazan; Attendance: 5,500; Referees: Sinisa Herceg, Robert Vyklicki, Anton Makhlin |

| June 8, 2016 | UNICS (Russia) | 74–81 (Series: 1–3) | (Russia) CSKA Moscow | Kazan |
| 19:30 | Scoring by quarter: 11–25, 15–17, 19–16, 29–23 |
| | Pts: Milaknis 23; Rebs: Williams 10; Asts: Ponkrashov 8 | Boxscore | Pts: De Colo 16; Rebs: Nichols 7 Asts: De Colo 5 | Arena: Basket-Hall Kazan; Attendance: 6,000; Referees: Sreten Radovic, Oskars Lucius, Marczyn Kowalski |

== Awards ==
=== Most Valuable Player ===
| Player | Team | Ref. |
|---|---|---|
| (France) Nando de Colo | (Russia) CSKA Moscow | |

=== Playoffs MVP ===
| Player | Team | Ref. |
|---|---|---|
| (Serbia) Miloš Teodosić | (Russia) CSKA Moscow | |

=== Sixth Man of the Year ===
| Player | Team | Ref. |
|---|---|---|
| (Spain) Quino Colom | (Russia) UNICS | |

=== Young Player of the Year ===
| Player | Team | Ref. |
|---|---|---|
| (Russia) Artem Klimenko | (Russia) Avtodor Saratov | |

=== Coach of the Year ===
| Coach | Team | Ref. |
|---|---|---|
| (Russia) Vasily Karasev | (Russia) Zenit St. Petersburg | |

=== Defensive Player of the Year ===
| Player | Team | Ref. |
|---|---|---|
| (United States) Kyle Hines | (Russia) CSKA Moscow | |

=== All-VTB United League Teams ===
| First Team | | Second Team | |
| Player | Team | Player | Team |
|---|---|---|---|
| (France) Nando de Colo | (Russia) CSKA Moscow | (Serbia) Miloš Teodosić | (Russia) CSKA Moscow |
| (United States) Keith Langford | (Russia) UNICS | (Montenegro) Tyrese Rice | (Russia) Khimki |
| (Russia) Alexey Shved | (Russia) Khimki | (United States) Ryan Toolson | (Russia) Zenit Saint Petersburg |
| (Latvia) Jānis Timma | (Russia) Zenit | (Spain) Víctor Claver | (Russia) Lokomotiv Kuban |
| (United States) Anthony Randolph | (Russia) Lokomotiv Kuban | (Austria) Rašid Mahalbašić | (Russia) Nizhny Novgorod |

=== Monthly MVP ===
| Month | Player | Team | Ref. |
|---|---|---|---|
| October | (United States) Ryan Toolson | (Russia) Zenit Saint Petersburg | |
| November | (United States) Keith Langford | (Russia) UNICS Kazan | |
| December | (Russia) Alexey Shved | (Russia) Khimki | |
| January | (United States) Malcolm Delaney | (Russia) Lokomotiv Kuban | |
| February | (United States) Anthony Randolph | (Russia) Lokomotiv Kuban (2) | |
| March | (United States) Victor Rudd | (Russia) Nizhny Novgorod | |
| April | (United States) Ryan Toolson (2) | (Russia) Zenit Saint Petersburg (2) | |

== Statistical leaders ==
Final statistics.

=== Efficiency ===
| Pos | Player | Club | PIR |
|---|---|---|---|
| 1 | (Nigeria) Ekene Ibekwe | Krasny Oktyabr | 20.8 |
| 2 | (Azerbaijan) Nik Caner-Medley | Astana | 20.3 |
| 3 | (United States) Jerry Jefferson | Krasny Oktyabr | 20.1 |

=== Points ===
| Pos | Player | Club | PPG |
|---|---|---|---|
| 1 | (United States) Keith Langford | UNICS | 21.0 |
| 2 | (United States) Jerry Jefferson | Krasny Oktyabr | 18.2 |
| 3 | (Azerbaijan) Nik Caner-Medley | Astana | 18.2 |

=== Rebounds ===
| Pos | Player | Club | RPG |
|---|---|---|---|
| 1 | (United States) Josh Boone | Khimki | 9.1 |
| 2 | (United States) Jerry Jefferson | Krasny Oktyabr | 8.8 |
| 3 | (Nigeria) Ekene Ibekwe | Krasny Oktyabr | 8.7 |

=== Assists ===
| Pos | Player | Club | APG |
|---|---|---|---|
| 1 | (Mexico) Paul Stoll | Avtodor Saratov | 7.1 |
| 2 | (Montenegro) Tyrese Rice | Khimki | 6.6 |
| 3 | (Kazakhstan) Jerry Johnson | Astana | 6.5 |

=== Season highs ===
| Category | | Player | Club |
|---|---|---|---|
| Efficiency | 42 | (Georgia (country)) Michael Dixon | ČEZ Nymburk |
| Points | 40 | (Russia) Egor Vyaltsev | Khimki |
| Rebounds | 20 | (United States) Josh Boone | Khimki |
| Assists | 17 | (Montenegro) Tyrese Rice | Khimki |
| Steals | 7 | (Greece) Pat Calathes | Astana |
| Blocks | 5 | 5 occasions | |
