= 2012–13 VTB United League =

VTB United League
- Season: 2012–13
- Teams: 20 (from 10 countries)

Regular season
- Top seed: Žalgiris Kaunas
- Season MVP: (Bulgaria) E. J. Rowland

Finals
- Champions: (Russia) CSKA Moscow; 4th title
- Runners-up: (Russia) Lokomotiv-Kuban Krasnodar
- Playoffs MVP: (Russia) Victor Khryapa

Awards
- Young Player: (Russia) Sergey Karasev

Statistical leaders
Points	(Bulgaria) E. J. Rowland	17.1
Rebounds	(Australia) Aleks Marić	8.5
Assists	(United States) Aaron Miles	7.3

The 2012–13 VTB United League was the fourth complete season of the VTB United League, which is Northern and Eastern Europe's top-tier level men's professional club basketball competition. The tournament featured 20 teams, from 10 countries. CSKA Moscow won its 4th VTB title, by beating Lokomotiv-Kuban Krasnodar, 3–1, in a best-of-five Finals series.

== Participants ==
Country (League)	Teams
Belarus (BPL)	Tsmoki-Minsk
Czech Republic (NBL)	ČEZ Basketball Nymburk
Estonia (KML)	Kalev/Cramo
Kazakhstan (Division 1)	Astana Tigers
Latvia (LBL)	VEF Rīga
Lithuania (LKL)	Lietuvos Rytas Vilnius
Lithuania (LKL)	Neptūnas Klaipėda
Lithuania (LKL)	Žalgiris Kaunas
Poland (PLK)	Turów Zgorzelec
Russia (PBL)	CSKA Moscow
Russia (PBL)	Enisey Krasnoyarsk
Russia (PBL)	Khimki Moscow Region
Russia (PBL)	Krasnye Krylya Samara
Russia (PBL)	Lokomotiv Kuban Krasnodar
Russia (PBL)	Nizhny Novgorod
Russia (PBL)	Spartak Saint Petersburg
Russia (PBL)	Triumph Lyubertsy
Russia (PBL)	UNICS Kazan
Ukraine (SuperLeague)	Azovmash Mariupol
Ukraine (SuperLeague)	Donetsk

== Regular season ==
Key to colors
Advances to Quarterfinals
Advances to Round of 16

=== Group A ===
	Team	Pld	W	L	PF	PA
1.	(Russia) Khimki	18	14	4	1451	1305
2.	(Russia) Unics Kazan	18	14	4	1328	1169
3.	(Russia) Krasnye Krylya Samara	18	12	6	1353	1304
4.	(Russia) Spartak Saint Petersburg	18	12	6	1292	1174
5.	(Kazakhstan) Astana Tigers	18	10	8	1332	1416
6.	(Ukraine) Donetsk	18	9	9	1429	1325
7.	(Lithuania) Lietuvos rytas	18	9	9	1402	1397
8.	(Poland) Turów Zgorzelec	18	4	14	1318	1403
9.	(Ukraine) Azovmash Mariupol	18	3	15	1287	1447
10.	(Estonia) Kalev/Cramo	18	3	15	1202	1389

	AST	AZO	DON	KAL	KHI	KRA	LR	SPA	TUR	UNI
(Kazakhstan) Astana Tigers		75–72	96–90	93–78	92–77	75–78	72–71	78–75	81–61	62–80
(Ukraine) Azovmash Mariupol	82–89		68–75	76–71	77–91	73–92	88–94	76–81	76–66	71–78
(Ukraine) Donetsk	76–56	83–66		67–46	66–84	96–87	95–79	88–80	99–85	63–74
(Estonia) Kalev/Cramo	81–85	73–77	61–60		57–65	73–83	60–73	53–71	72–68	52–70
(Russia) Khimki	104–75	91–73	72–58	77–67		82–81	80–69	72–60	91–72	85–74
(Russia) Krasnye Krylya Samara	61–66	72–62	64–59	83–73	76–67		89–72	75–70	81–77	56–69
(Lithuania) Lietuvos rytas	93–60	75–56	99–97	95–73	79–88	81–70		63–83	78–71	87–80
(Russia) Spartak Saint Petersburg	74–57	74–58	59–63	80–59	74–69	61–63	75–48		76–74	84–68
(Poland) Turów Zgorzelec	93–66	78–69	83–81	80–81	79–86	74–76	86–78	59–63		64–69
(Russia) Unics Kazan	70–54	89–67	66–48	86–72	76–70	74–66	74–68	51–52	80–48	

=== Group B ===
	Team	Pld	W	L	PF	PA
1.	(Lithuania) Žalgiris Kaunas	18	16	2	1499	1269
2.	(Russia) CSKA Moscow	18	15	3	1390	1160
3.	(Russia) Lokomotiv-Kuban Krasnodar	18	12	6	1423	1318
4.	(Latvia) VEF Rīga	18	11	7	1523	1446
5.	(Russia) Nizhny Novgorod	18	10	8	1320	1261
6.	(Russia) Triumph Lyubertsy	18	9	9	1413	1363
7.	(Russia) Enisey Krasnoyarsk	18	6	12	1337	1438
8.	(Czech Republic) ČEZ Basketball Nymburk	18	5	13	1282	1448
9.	(Belarus) Tsmoki-Minsk	18	3	15	1246	1451
10.	(Lithuania) Neptūnas Klaipėda	18	3	15	1381	1597

	ČEZ	CSK	ENI	LOK	NEP	NN	TRI	TSM	VEF	ŽAL
(Czech Republic) ČEZ Basketball Nymburk		63–76	69–61	81–74	84–78	73–81	68–96	65–56	81–83	84–90
(Russia) CSKA Moscow	84–75		77–52	83–56	79–57	83–60	80–71	68–57	83–75	68–74
(Russia) Enisey Krasnoyarsk	81–59	64–73		87–94	63–77	62–67	74–78	77–74	96–93	64–99
(Russia) Lokomotiv Kuban-Krasnodar	75–54	61–72	93–64		84–48	75–74	74–65	89–74	95–98	70–78
(Lithuania) Neptūnas Klaipėda	96–86	72–83	88–89	83–95		72–90	88–97	110–106	60–86	62–90
(Russia) Nizhny Novgorod	82–66	70–68	84–44	54–61	84–63		76–80	55–54	82–86	58–76
(Russia) Triumph Lyubertsy	89–52	62–82	77–81	78–89	83–80	71–59		80–66	78–80	69–70
(Belarus) Tsmoki-Minsk	71–63	48–90	65–79	64–80	93–71	66–93	62–85		74–85	86–82
(Latvia) VEF Rīga	85–89	67–75	85–69	72–77	94–89	87–89	101–78	98–73		77–72
(Lithuania) Žalgiris Kaunas	90–70	76–66	86–61	89–81	111–87	69–62	80–76	81–57	86–71	

== Playoffs ==
=== Round of 16 ===
The teams that finished third, fourth, fifth and sixth in the other group in a Best-Of-3 series.

Team 1	Series	Team 2	Game 1	Game 2	Game 3
Krasnye Krylya Samara (Russia)	2–0	(Russia) Triumph Lyubertsy	76–69	77–67	
Lokomotiv-Kuban (Russia)	2–0	(Ukraine) Donetsk	86–80	88–77	
Spartak Saint Petersburg (Russia)	1–2	(Russia) Nizhny Novgorod	83–69	57–62	85–88
VEF Rīga (Latvia)	2–1	(Kazakhstan) Astana Tigers	76–89	87–54	76–67

=== Quarterfinals ===
The teams that finished first and two in the other group battled with 1/8 final winners in a Best-Of-5 series.

Team 1	Series	Team 2	Game 1	Game 2	Game 3	Game 4	Game 5
Khimki (Russia)	3–0	(Latvia) VEF Rīga	103–82	104–82	82–60		
Žalgiris Kaunas (Lithuania)	3–1	(Russia) Nizhny Novgorod	75–63	66–62	59–60	66–59	
Unics Kazan (Russia)	1–3	(Russia) Lokomotiv-Kuban	72–80	65–77	68–65	64–68	
CSKA Moscow (Russia)	3–1	(Russia) Krasnye Krylya Samara	77–46	87–78	49–50	69–56	

=== Semifinals ===
The teams that won in 1/4 final, battled with other 1/4 final winner in a Best-Of-5 series.

Team 1	Series	Team 2	Game 1	Game 2	Game 3	Game 4	Game 5
Khimki (Russia)	2–3	(Russia) CSKA Moscow	83–80	72–74	47–61	77–75	64–87
Žalgiris Kaunas (Lithuania)	1–3	(Russia) Lokomotiv-Kuban	80–53	63–85	72–82	62–84	

=== Final ===
The teams that won in 1/2 final, battled with other 1/2 final winner in a Best-Of-5 series.

Team 1	Series	Team 2	Game 1	Game 2	Game 3	Game 4	Game 5
CSKA Moscow (Russia)	3–1	(Russia) Lokomotiv-Kuban	72–65	64–54	58–69	59–54	

==== Rosters ====
Champion: Miloš Teodosić, Vladimir Micov, Aleksandr Gudumak, Aaron Jackson, Dmitry Sokolov, Nenad Krstić, Sonny Weems, Aleksei Zozulin, Zoran Erceg, Evgeny Voronov, Andrey Vorontsevich, Sasha Kaun, Victor Khryapa, Anton Ponkrashov, Theo Papaloukas (Coach: Ettore Messina)

- Top efficiency: Victor Khryapa, 15.0 EFF
- Top scorer: Sonny Weems, 11.0 PPG
- Top rebounder: Victor Khryapa, 7.0 RPG
- Top assister: Victor Khryapa, 4.3 APG

Runner-up: Maxim Grigoryev, Derrick Brown, Richard Hendrix, Alexey Savrasenko, Mantas Kalnietis, Sergey Bykov, Valeriy Likhodey, Simas Jasaitis, James Baron, Andrey Zubkov, Aleks Marić, Nick Calathes, Maksym Sheleketo (Coach: Evgeniy Pashutin)

- Top efficiency: Nick Calathes, 16.1 EFF
- Top scorer: Nick Calathes, 13.9 PPG
- Top rebounder: Aleks Marić, 6.6 RPG
- Top assister: Nick Calathes, 6.1 APG

== Awards ==
- Most Valuable Player: (Bulgaria) E. J. Rowland (VEF Riga)
- Playoffs MVP: (Russia) Victor Khryapa (CSKA Moscow)
- Young Player of the Year: (Russia) Sergey Karasev (Triumph Lyubertsy)

=== All-Tournament First Team ===
- (Greece) Nick Calathes (Lokomotiv-Kuban)
- (Russia) Vitaly Fridzon (Khimky)
- (United States) Sonny Weems (CSKA Moscow)
- (Russia) Victor Khryapa (CSKA Moscow)
- (United States) Paul Davis (Khimky)

=== All-Tournament Second Team ===
- (Serbia) Miloš Teodosić (CSKA Moscow)
- (Bulgaria) E. J. Rowland (VEF Rīga)
- (Lithuania) Mindaugas Kuzminskas (Žalgiris)
- (Australia) Aleks Marić (Lokomotiv-Kuban)
- (Serbia) Nenad Krstić (CSKA Moscow)

=== Nationality awards ===
For the first time, awards were handed out to the best player by nationality.

Nationality	Player	Team	Ref.
(Czech Republic) Czech	Petr Benda	(Czech Republic) CEZ Nymburk	
(Estonia) Estonian	Tanel Sokk	(Estonia) Kalev/Cramo	
(Poland) Polish	Aaron Cel	(Poland) Turów Zgorzelec	
(Kazakhstan) Kazakh	Anton Ponomarev	(Kazakhstan) Astana	
(Belarus) Belarusian	Vladimir Veremeenko	(Russia) UNICS Kazan	
(Latvia) Latvian	Kristaps Janicenoks	(Latvia) VEF Rīga	
(Ukraine) Ukrainian	Oleksiy Pecherov	(Ukraine) Azovmash	
(Lithuania) Lithuanian	Mantas Kalnietis	(Russia) Lokomotiv-Kuban	
(Russia) Russian	Victor Khryapa	(Russia) CSKA Moscow	

=== Monthly MVP ===
Month	Player	Team	Ref.
October	(Lithuania) Ksistof Lavrinovic	(Lithuania) Žalgiris Kaunas	
November	(Bulgaria) E.J. Rowland	(Latvia) VEF Rīga	
December	(Serbia) Miloš Teodosić	(Russia) CSKA Moscow	
January	(Bosnia and Herzegovina) Zack Wright	(Russia) Spartak St. Petersburg	
February	(Lithuania) Mantas Kalnietis	(Russia) Lokomotiv-Kuban	
March	(Lithuania) Darius Songaila	(Ukraine) Azovmash	
