= Russian Professional Basketball League awards =

The Russian Professional Basketball League awards were given out by the former top-tier level professional basketball league in Russia, the Russian Professional Basketball League (RPBL).

== PBL awards ==
=== Russian Professional Basketball League (PBL) 2010–11 season awards ===
==== PBL regular season MVP ====
- (Poland) Maciej Lampe (UNICS Kazan)

==== PBL playoffs MVP ====
- (Russia) Victor Khryapa (CSKA Moscow)

==== PBL All-Symbolic Team ====
- PBL First Symbolic Team
  - (United States) Patrick Beverley (Spartak St. Petersburg)
  - (United States) Keith Langford (Khimki Moscow Region)
  - (Bosnia and Herzegovina) Henry Domercant (Spartak St. Petersburg)
  - (Russia) Sergei Monia (Khimki Moscow Region)
  - (Poland) Maciej Lampe (UNICS Kazan)
- PBL Second Symbolic Team
  - (United States) Marcus Williams (Yenisey Krasnoyarsk)
  - (United States) Terrell Lyday (UNICS Kazan)
  - (Lithuania) Ramūnas Šiškauskas (CSKA Moscow)
  - (North Macedonia) Jeremiah Massey (Lokomotiv Kuban)
  - (United States) Lonny Baxter (Yenisey Krasnoyarsk)

=== Russian Professional Basketball League (PBL) 2011–12 season awards ===
==== PBL regular season MVP ====
- (United States) Davon Jefferson (Triumph Lyubertsy)

==== PBL playoffs MVP ====
- (Russia) Alexey Shved (CSKA Moscow)

==== PBL All-Symbolic Team ====
- PBL First Symbolic Team
  - (United States) Patrick Beverley (Spartak St. Petersburg)
  - (Croatia) Zoran Planinić (Khimki Moscow Region)
  - (United States) Davon Jefferson (Triumph Lyubertsy)
  - (Russia) Andrei Kirilenko (CSKA Moscow)
  - (North Macedonia) Jeremiah Massey (Lokomotiv Kuban)
- PBL Second Symbolic Team
  - (United States) Torey Thomas (Spartak Primorye)
  - (Russia) Vitaly Fridzon (Khimki Moscow Region)
  - (Russia) Sergey Karasev (Triumph Lyubertsy)
  - (Russia) Victor Khryapa (CSKA Moscow)
  - (Belarus) Vladimir Veremeenko (UNICS Kazan)

== See also ==
- Russian Gold Basket Awards
