= Russian Professional Basketball Championship =

The Russian Professional Basketball Championship is the top-tier level men's professional club basketball competition in Russia. Over the years, there have been 3 different incarnations of the Russian Basketball Championship. The Russian Super League 1, from the 1991–92 to 2009–10 seasons, the Russian Professional League (PBL), from the 2010–11 to 2011–13 seasons, and the VTB United League, from the 2013–14 season to the present. During the Soviet Union era, the USSR Premier League served as the national championship for Russian Soviet Federative Socialist Republic clubs.

== History ==
From the 1991–92 to 2009–10 seasons, the winner of the Super League 1 was awarded the top-level Russian national championship. For three seasons, the PBL was Russia's highest tier, and in the 2013–14 season, the VTB United League, a regional league for Eastern Europe, was named the new top-level national domestic competition for Russian clubs.

== Champions ==
Key
§	Denotes the team won the Russian Cup as well
Team (X)	Denotes the number of times the club won the title

Season	League	(gold) Champion	Score	(silver) Runner-up	(bronze) Third place
1991–92	Russia Super League A (national)	CSKA Moscow (1)		Stroitel Samara	Avtodor Saratov
1992–93	Russia Super League A (national)	CSKA Moscow (2)		Spartak Saint Petersburg	Stroitel Samara
1993–94	Russia Super League A (national)	CSKA Moscow (3)		Avtodor Saratov	CSK VVS Samara
1994–95	Russia Super League A (national)	CSKA Moscow (4)	3–0	Dynamo Moscow	CSK VVS Samara
1995–96	Russia Super League A (national)	CSKA Moscow (5)	3–2	Dynamo Moscow	Avtodor Saratov
1996–97	Russia Super League A (national)	CSKA Moscow (6)	3–2	Avtodor Saratov	BC Samara
1997–98	Russia Super League A (national)	CSKA Moscow (7)	3–1	Avtodor Saratov	BC Samara
1998–99	Russia Super League A (national)	CSKA Moscow (8)	2–0	Avtodor Saratov	Arsenal
1999–2000	Russia Super League A (national)	CSKA Moscow (9)	3–0	Ural Great Perm	UNICS
2000–01	Russia Super League A (national)	Ural Great Perm (1)	3–0	UNICS	Lokomotiv-Kuban
2001–02	Russia Super League A (national)	Ural Great Perm (2)	3–1	UNICS	Lokomotiv-Kuban
2002–03	Russia Super League A (national)	CSKA Moscow^{§} (10)	3–1	Ural Great Perm	UNICS
2003–04	Russia Super League A (national)	CSKA Moscow (11)	3–1	UNICS	Dynamo Moscow
2004–05	Russia Super League A (national)	CSKA Moscow^{§} (12)	3–1	Dynamo Moscow	UNICS
2005–06	Russia Super League A (national)	CSKA Moscow^{§} (13)	3–0	Khimki	Dynamo Saint Petersburg
2006–07	Russia Super League A (national)	CSKA Moscow^{§} (14)	3–0	UNICS	Khimki
2007–08	Russia Super League A (national)	CSKA Moscow (15)	3–0	Khimki	Dynamo Moscow
2008–09	Russia Super League A (national)	CSKA Moscow (16)	3–1	Khimki	UNICS
2009–10	Russia Super League A (national)	CSKA Moscow^{§} (17)	3–0	Khimki	UNICS
2010–11	Russia PBL (national)	CSKA Moscow (18)	3–1	Khimki	UNICS
2011–12	Russia PBL (national)	CSKA Moscow (19)	2–0	Khimki	Lokomotiv-Kuban
2012–13	Russia PBL (national)	CSKA Moscow (20)	—N/a	Khimki	Spartak Saint Petersburg
2013–14	VTB United League (international)	CSKA Moscow (21)	3–0	Nizhny Novgorod	UNICS
2014–15	VTB United League (international)	CSKA Moscow (22)	3–0	Khimki	Lokomotiv-Kuban
2015–16	VTB United League (international)	CSKA Moscow (23)	3–1	UNICS	Zenit Saint Petersburg
2016–17	VTB United League (international)	CSKA Moscow (24)	3–0	Khimki	Zenit Saint Petersburg
2017–18	VTB United League (international)	CSKA Moscow (25)	95:84	Khimki	Zenit Saint Petersburg
2018–19	VTB United League (international)	CSKA Moscow (26)	3–0	Khimki	UNICS
2019–20	VTB United League (international)	Cancelled due to the COVID-19 pandemic - no champion announced.			
2020–21	VTB United League (international)	CSKA Moscow (27)	3–0	UNICS	Zenit Saint Petersburg
2021–22	VTB United League (international)	Zenit Saint Petersburg (1)	4–3	CSKA Moscow	UNICS
2022–23	VTB United League (international)	UNICS (1)	4–1	Lokomotiv Kuban	CSKA Moscow
2023–24	VTB United League (international)	CSKA Moscow (28)	4–1	UNICS	BC Zenit Saint Petersburg
2024–25	VTB United League (international)	CSKA Moscow (29)	4–2	Zenit Saint Petersburg	UNICS

== Awards ==
=== MVP ===
Super League

Year	Player	Team
1994	(Russia) Valeri Tikhonenko	CSK VVS-Samara
1995	(Russia) Valeri Tikhonenko (2)	CSK VVS-Samara
1999	(Russia) Andrei Fetisov	Avtodor Saratov
2001	(Russia) Sergei Chikalkin	Ural Great Perm

Year	Player	Team
2004	(United States) Marcus Brown	CSKA Moscow
2005	(Greece) Theo Papaloukas	CSKA Moscow
2006	(Greece) Theo Papaloukas	CSKA Moscow
2007	(Greece) Theo Papaloukas (3)	CSKA Moscow
2008	(United States) Trajan Langdon	CSKA Moscow
2009	(Lithuania) Ramūnas Šiškauskas	CSKA Moscow

PBL

Year	Player	Team
2011	(Poland) Maciej Lampe	UNICS Kazan
2012	(United States) Davon Jefferson	Triumph Lyubertsy
2013	(Socialist Federal Republic of Yugoslavia) Miloš Teodosić	PBC CSKA Moscow

VTB Promo

Year	Player	Team
2009–10	(Russia) Victor Khryapa	PBC CSKA Moscow
2010–11	(United States) Ramel Curry	(Ukraine) BC Azovmash
2011–12	(Russia) Andrei Kirilenko	PBC CSKA Moscow
2012–13	(United States) (Bulgaria) E.J. Rowland	(Latvia) VEF Rīga

VTB

Year	Player	Team
2013–14	(United States) Drew Goudelock	UNICS Kazan
2014–15	(France) Nando de Colo	PBC CSKA Moscow
2015–16	(France) Nando de Colo	PBC CSKA Moscow
2016–17	(Russia) Alexey Shved	BC Khimki
2017–18	(France) Nando de Colo (3)	PBC CSKA Moscow
2018–19	(Russia) Alexey Shved (2)	BC Khimki
2019–20	Not awarded	
2020–21	(Lithuania) Mantas Kalnietis	Lokomotiv Kuban
2021–22	(Croatia) Mario Hezonja	UNICS Kazan
2022–23	(Serbia) Nikola Milutinov	PBC CSKA Moscow
2023–24	(North Macedonia) Nenad Dimitrijević	UNICS Kazan
2024-25	(United States) Dwayne Bacon	BC Zenit Saint Petersburg

=== Coaches ===
Super League

Year	Player	Team
2004	(Serbia) Dušan Ivković	CSKA Moscow
2005	(United States) / (Israel) David Blatt	BC Dynamo Saint Petersburg
2006	(Italy) Ettore Messina	CSKA Moscow
2007	(Italy) Ettore Messina	CSKA Moscow
2008	(Italy) Ettore Messina	CSKA Moscow
2009	(Italy) Ettore Messina (4)	CSKA Moscow

== Topscorers ==
Super League

Year	Player	Team	PPG
2008	(United States) Lee Nailon	Sibirtelecom Lokomotiv Novosibirsk	22.0
2009	(United States) Lionel Chalmers	Universitet Yugra Surgut	21.5
2010	(Russia) Sergey Bykov	Dynamo Moscow	20.8

PBL

Year	Player	Team	PPG
2010-11	(United States) Tywain McKee	Triumph Lyubertsy	18.6
2011-12	(United States) Davon Jefferson	Triumph Lyubertsy	20.8
2012–13	(Russia) Sergey Karasev	Triumph Lyubertsy	317 (total)

Source: eurobasket.com

VTB :

== Statistical leaders ==
=== Rebounds ===
Super League

Year	Player	Team	PPG
2009	(Russia) Victor Khryapa	CSKA Moscow	7.9
2010	(Russia) Victor Khryapa	CSKA Moscow	8.7

PBL

Year	Player	Team	PPG
2010-11	(Kazakhstan) (Russia) Alexey Zhukanenko	Dynamo Moscow	7.4
2011-12	(United States) Cuthbert Victor	Spartak Primorye	8.1
2012–13	(Russia) Victor Khryapa	CSKA Moscow	113 (total)

=== Assists ===
Super League

Year	Player	Team	PPG
2009	(United States) Jannero Pargo	Dynamo Moscow	5.9
2010	(United States) J.R. Bremer	BC Krasnye Krylia	5.7

PBL

Year	Player	Team	PPG
2010-11	(United States) Marcus Williams	Enisey Krasnoyarsk	8.6
2011-12	(United States) Aaron Miles	BC Krasnye Krylia	6.0
2012–13	(United States) Aaron Miles	BC Krasnye Krylia	96 (total)

Source: eurobasket.com

== Medals by club ==
Club	Gold medal	Silver medal	Bronze medal	Total
CSKA Moscow	27	1	1	29
Ural Great Perm	2	2	0	4
UNICS	1	6	9	16
Zenit Saint Petersburg	1	0	4	5
Khimki	0	11	1	12
Avtodor Saratov	0	4	2	6
Dynamo Moscow	0	3	2	5
Lokomotiv Kuban	0	1	4	5
Samara	0	1	3	4
Spartak Saint Petersburg	0	1	1	2
Nizhny Novgorod	0	1	0	1
CSK VVS	0	0	2	2
Arsenal	0	0	1	1
Dynamo Saint Petersburg	0	0	1	1

== All–time national champions ==
Total number of national champions won by Russian clubs. Table includes titles won during the USSR Premier Basketball League (1923–1992).

Club	Trophies	Years won
CSKA Moscow	51	1944–45, 1959–60, 1960–61, 1961–62, 1963–64, 1964–65, 1965–66, 1968–69, 1969–70, 1970–71, 1971–72, 1972–73, 1973–74, 1975–76, 1976–77, 1977–78, 1978–79, 1979–80, 1980–81, 1981–82, 1982–83, 1983–84, 1987–88, 1989–90, 1992, 1992–93, 1993–94, 1994–95, 1995–96, 1996–97, 1997–98, 1998–99, 1999–00, 2002–03, 2003–04, 2004–05, 2005–06, 2006–07, 2007–08, 2008–09, 2009–10, 2010–11, 2011–12, 2012–13, 2013–14, 2014–15, 2015–16, 2016–17, 2017–18, 2018–19, 2020–21
Burevestnik Leningrad	2	1937–38, 1939–40
Dynamo Moscow	2	1936–37, 1947–48
Spartak Saint Petersburg	2	1974–75, 1991–92
Ural Great Perm	2	2000–01, 2001–02
Lokomotiv Moscow	1	1938–39
VVS Moscow	1	1951–52
Zenit Saint Petersburg	1	2021–22
UNICS	1	2022–23

== See also ==
- Russian Super League 1: (1992–present)
- Russian Professional League: (2010–2013)
- Russian Cup: (1999–present)
- VTB United League: (2008–present)
- USSR Premier League: (1923–1992)
- USSR Cup: (1949–1987)
- Russian basketball league system
- Basketball in Russia
