= Miloš Teodosić =

Serbian basketball player (born 1987)

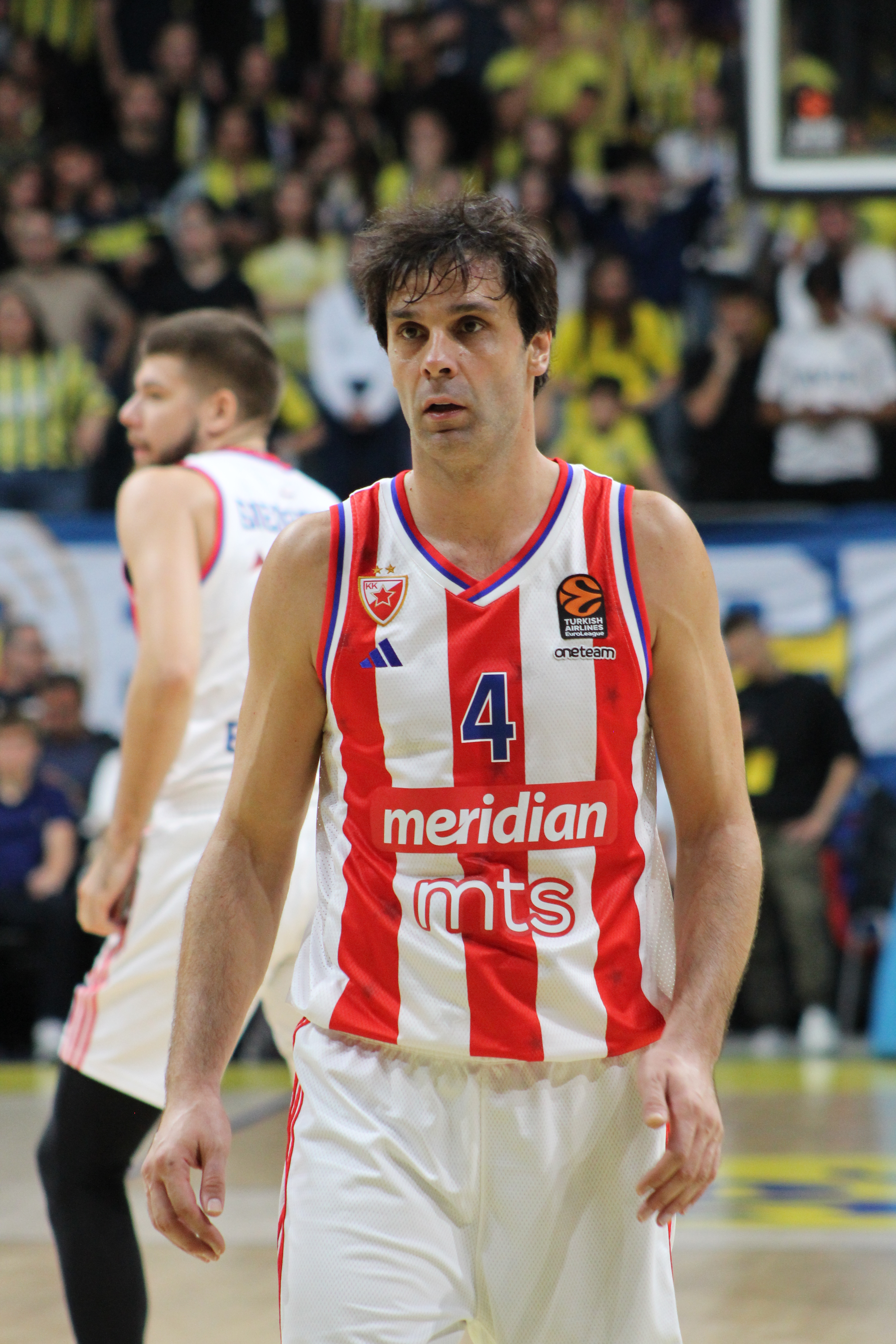
- Teodosić with Crvena Zvezda in 2024

Crvena zvezda Meridianbet
- Title: Sporting director
- League: Basketball League of Serbia; Adriatic League

Personal information
- Born: March 19, 1987 (age 39) Valjevo, SR Serbia, Yugoslavia
- Listed height: 1.96 m (6 ft 5 in)
- Listed weight: 90 kg (198 lb)

Career information
- NBA draft: 2009: undrafted
- Playing career: 2004–2025
- Position: Point guard / shooting guard
- Number: 18, 4, 44

Career history
- 2004–2007: FMP
- 2005–2006: →Borac Čačak
- 2007–2011: Olympiacos
- 2011–2017: CSKA Moscow
- 2017–2019: Los Angeles Clippers
- 2019–2023: Virtus Bologna
- 2023–2025: Crvena Zvezda

Career highlights
- EuroLeague champion (2016); EuroLeague MVP (2010); 3× All-EuroLeague First Team (2010, 2015, 2016); 3× All-EuroLeague Second Team (2012, 2013, 2017); 2× EuroLeague assists leader (2015, 2017); EuroLeague 2010–20 All-Decade Team (2020); EuroLeague 25th Anniversary Team (2025); EuroCup champion (2022); EuroCup Finals MVP (2022); EuroCup MVP (2020); EuroCup Top Scorer (2020); EuroCup assists leader (2022); 2× All-EuroCup First Team (2021, 2022); Euroscar Player of the Year (2016); FIBA Europe Player of the Year (2010); 6× VTB United League champion (2012–2017); Lega Serie A champion (2021); 2× Russian League champion (2012, 2013); ABA League champion (2024); 4× Serbian Cup winner (2005, 2007, 2024, 2025); 2× Greek Cup winner (2010, 2011); 2× Italian Supercup winner (2021, 2022); Lega Serie A Finals MVP (2021); 2× VTB United League Playoffs MVP (2014, 2016); Russian League MVP (2013); All-Lega Serie A First Team (2020); All-ABA League Team (2024); All-Russian League First Team (2013); 5× All-VTB United League Second Team (2013–2017); VTB United League Hall of Fame (2019); Serbian League assists leader (2007); Serbian Cup MVP (2024); 2× Greek Cup Finals MVP (2010, 2011); Serbian Player of the Year (2016); FIBA Europe Under-20 Championship MVP (2007)

Career statistics
- Points: 477 (8.0 ppg)
- Rebounds: 142 (2.4 rpg)
- Assists: 241 (4.0 apg)
- Stats at NBA.com
- Stats at Basketball Reference
Medals
Men's basketball
Representing Serbia
Olympic Games
Silver medal – second place	2016 Rio de Janeiro
FIBA World Cup
Silver medal – second place	2014 Spain
EuroBasket
Silver medal – second place	2009 Poland
U20 European Championship
Gold medal – first place	2007 Slovenia	Under-20
Representing Serbia and Montenegro
U18 European Championship
Gold medal – first place	2005 Serbia and Montenegro	Under-18
U16 European Championship
Gold medal – first place	2003 Spain	Under-16

Miloš Teodosić (Serbian Cyrillic: Милош Теодосић, born March 19, 1987) is a Serbian professional basketball executive and former player, who is currently the sports director of Crvena Zvezda. He also represented the National Basketball Team of Serbia internationally. He primarily played the point guard and shooting guard positions. He is a six time All-EuroLeague selection, and was voted EuroLeague MVP in 2010.

Under Teodosić the Serbia national team won a EuroBasket silver medal in 2009, as well as a FIBA Basketball World Cup silver medal in 2014, being elected to the All-Tournament Team in both competitions. He also won an Olympic silver medal at the 2016 Rio Games. He was named FIBA Europe Player of the Year in 2010, and in 2016, he was voted the best non-NBA player in the world by NBA coaches, as well as the European Player of the Year by La Gazzetta dello Sport.

== Professional career ==
Following his retirement as an active player, Teodosić transitioned into executive roles, serving as a sports director.

=== Early years ===
He began playing basketball in hometown clubs KK Student and Metalac. He then moved to Belgrade-based club FMP where he signed his first professional contract. After being loaned to Borac Čačak for the 2005–06 season, he had a breakthrough 2006–07 season. Over 16 games in the ULEB Cup (now called EuroCup), he averaged 7.8 points, 2.9 assists, and 2.1 rebounds per game. FMP was eventually eliminated in the semi-final of this second-tier level European-wide competition. They also played in the final series of the Adriatic League playoffs, where they lost to Partizan Belgrade.

=== Olympiacos (2007–2011) ===
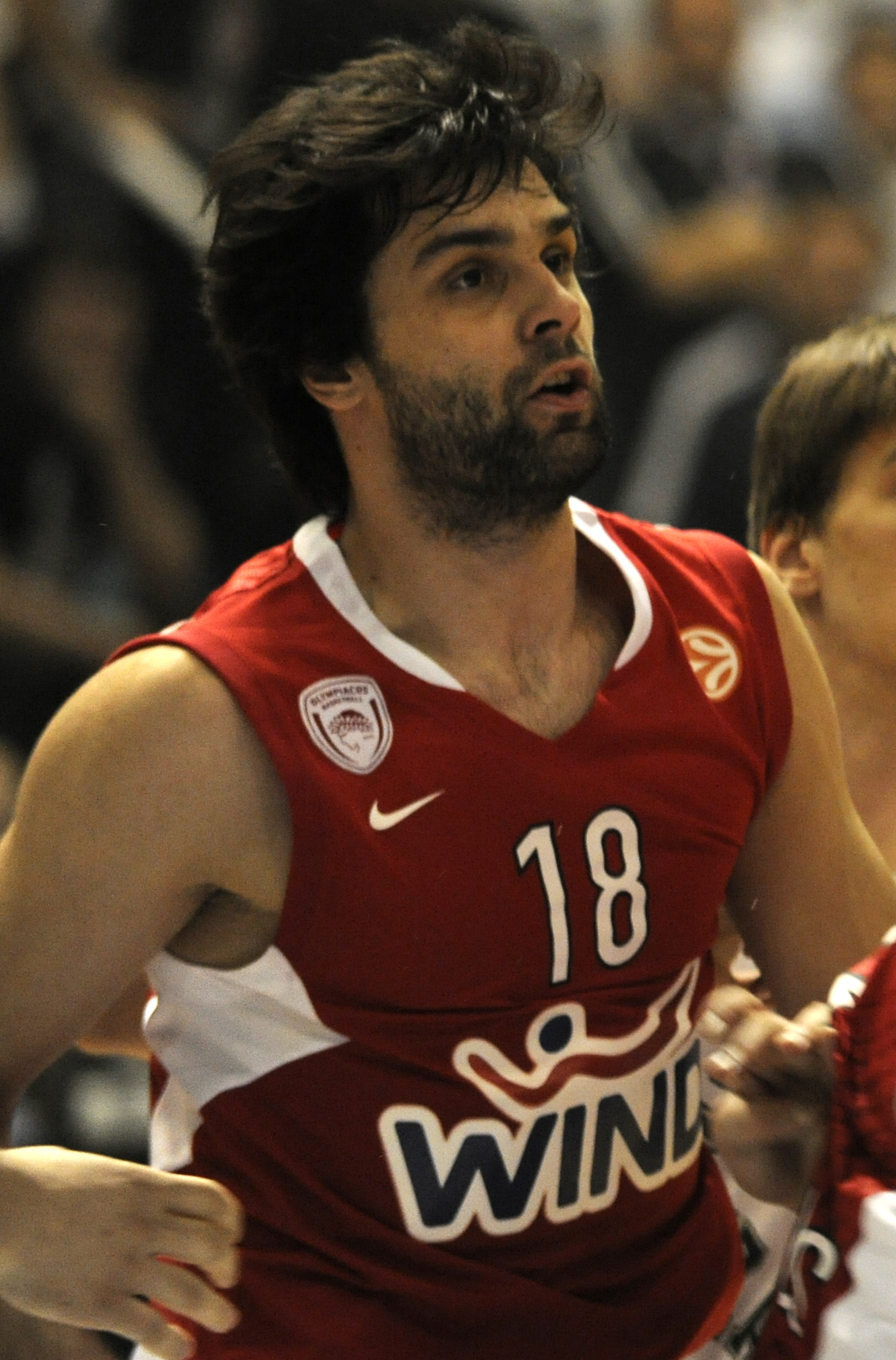
Teodosić in 2009

In 2007, Teodosić signed a five-year contract with Olympiacos of the Greek Basket League, worth €2.8 million net income (after taxes). Olympiacos also had to pay a buyout to FMP, to secure his rights. The contract he signed with Olympiacos included a €1.3 million buyout clause amount. However, the contract also stipulated that Olympiacos would hold the right to match any offer made to him by another club that offered to pay his buyout.

In the 2009–10 Euroleague season, Teodosić averaged 13.4 points, 2.5 rebounds, 4.9 assists, and 1.8 steals per game, all career highs up to that point. Teodosić played a crucial role in Olympiacos Pireaus, reaching the EuroLeague Final Four, where they eventually lost in the final to FC Barcelona, after beating KK Partizan in the semi-final. Teodosić was voted onto the All-EuroLeague First Team, and on May 8, 2010, he was officially announced as the EuroLeague 2010 MVP, his first, and to this date only, EuroLeague MVP award win in his career.

=== CSKA Moscow (2011–2017) ===
On July 6, 2011, Teodosić signed a three-year contract with CSKA Moscow of the Russian League and VTB United League. The contract was worth €5.7 million euros net income. In his first season with the Russian club, he led them to the EuroLeague Final, where they lost 62–61 to his former club, Olympiacos. He was named to the All-EuroLeague Second Team before the start of the Final Four. His second season with CSKA was statistically even better for him, as he averaged 12.7 points, 4.9 assists, and a career-high 2.8 rebounds in the EuroLeague. He was also once again named to the All-EuroLeague Second Team, his second consecutive nomination.

2013–14 season

After beating Panathinaikos in the quarterfinal playoff series round in the 2013–14 Euroleague, CSKA Moscow lost in the semi-final of the EuroLeague Final Four to Maccabi Tel Aviv. Shortly after failing to win the EuroLeague for the third straight year, the president of CSKA blamed Teodosić and his Serbian teammate, Nenad Krstić, for not putting enough effort in over the season. Back on the Russian national domestic league front, shortly after the EuroLeague Final Four, CSKA was facing elimination in the VTB United League playoff quarterfinal series versus Lokomotiv Kuban, trailing 0–2, without home court advantage. Teodosić and Krstić helped CSKA storm back to win the series 3–2, after the large deficit, to advance to the league's semi-finals, as they answered the previous criticism from the club's president. Eventually, CSKA won the VTB United League by sweeping Nizhny Novgorod 3–0 in the finals series. Teodosić was named the VTB Playoffs MVP. Despite winning the VTB United League, the 2013–14 season was seen as a disappointment for CSKA, and it was expected that Teodosić, as well as his teammate Nenad Krstić, and team head coach Ettore Messina, could all leave the club over the summer. Eventually, Krstić and Messina left the club. However, in June 2014, Teodosić extended his contract with the club for three more years.

2014–15 season

On November 7, 2014, in a EuroLeague game victory against Unicaja Málaga, Teodosić recorded a career-high 27 points, while also adding 10 assists. In May 2015, he was named to the All-EuroLeague First Team for his performances throughout the season. CSKA Moscow managed to advance to the EuroLeague Final Four for the fourth straight season, after eliminating Panathinaikos, for the second straight season in the quarter-finals series 3–1. However, in the semi-final game, despite being dubbed by media members as the favorite to advance, CSKA Moscow once again lost to Olympiacos. The final score was 70–68, after Olympiacos came back in the 4th quarter, led by Vassilis Spanoulis. Teodosić was ineffective in the game, scoring 8 points, on 2 for 9 shooting, with 5 assists, and 6 turnovers. CSKA Moscow eventually finished in third place, after defeating Fenerbahçe 86–80 in the third place game, in a game which Teodosić did not play, due to muscle fatigue.

Teodosić, however, had one of his best seasons in his time at the club, averaging a career-high 14.8 points, 2.8 rebounds, and a league-leading 7 assists, over 24 games played in the EuroLeague. CSKA Moscow finished the season by winning the VTB United League, after eliminating Khimki 3–0 in the league's finals series.

2015–16 season

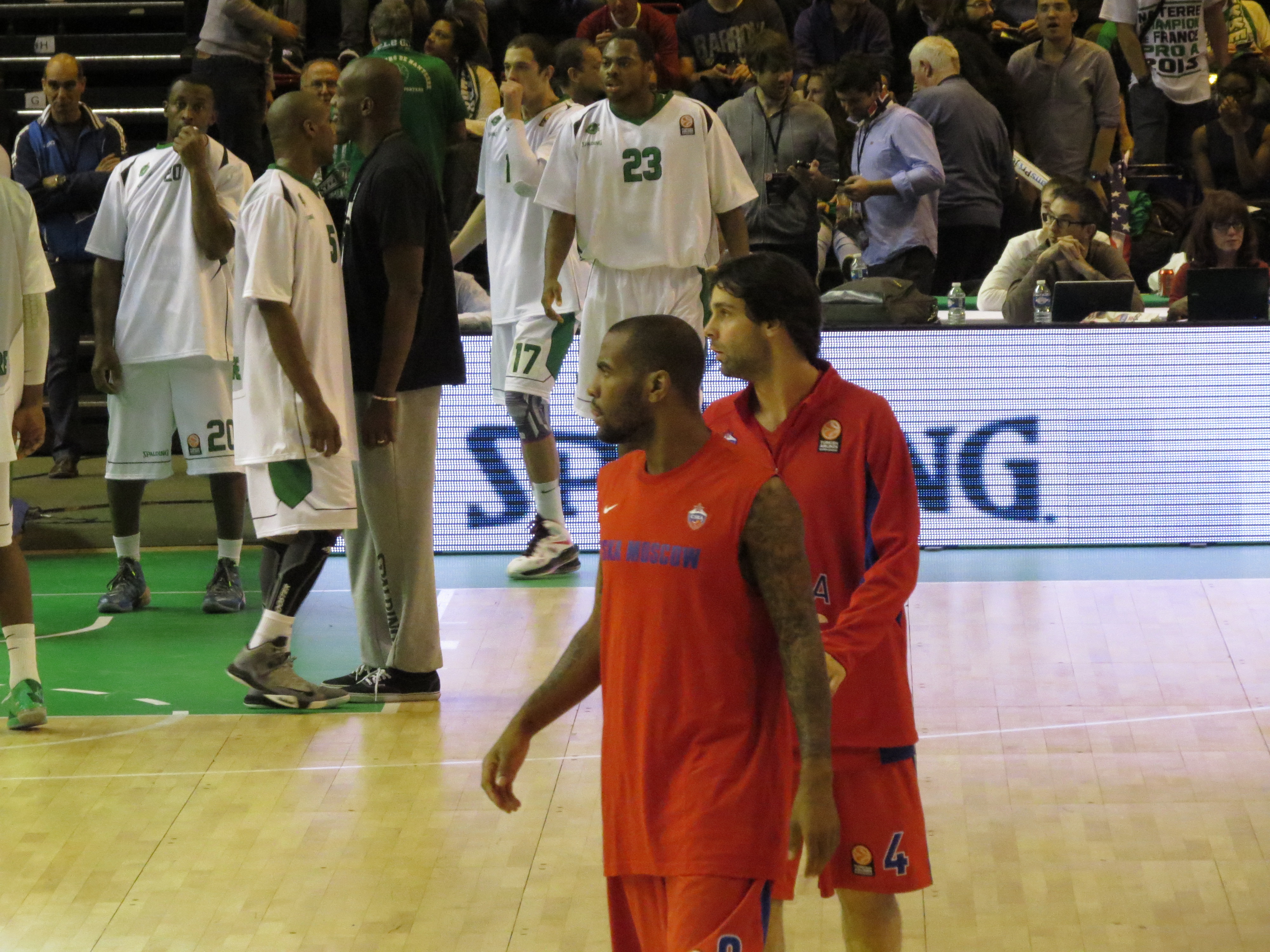
Teodosić with CSKA Moscow during the warm-up

In the 2015–16 EuroLeague season, Teodosić formed one of the deadliest 1–2 punches in the EuroLeague, along with Nando de Colo, who ended up being voted the season's EuroLeague MVP. The team solidified its quality with the usual good results prior to the EuroLeague Final Four, with Teodosić playing one of the best seasons of his career. He shot the ball very efficiently overall in each stage of the competition. The year proved to be successful for CSKA, as they finally won the EuroLeague championship, after beating Fenerbahce Ulker Istanbul 101–96 in the finals, after overtime. Individually, Teodosić was a key player in the win, posting 19 points, 7 assists, 5 rebounds, and 2 steals, and thus, finally winning the EuroLeague title, after several previous failed attempts to do so in the EuroLeague Final Four.

2016–17 season

On October 31, 2016, he was named the October 2016 EuroLeague MVP of the Month. His performance index rating of 43 in the Round 9 was the highest in the EuroLeague that season and the second-best in CSKA's illustrious history. CSKA Moscow finished the season winning the 3rd place at the 2017 EuroLeague Final Four and winning the VTB United League. Teodosić averaged career-high-tying 16.1 points and season-best 6.8 assists over 29 EuroLeague games. At the end of the season his contract with CSKA Moscow expired and he left the club.

=== Los Angeles Clippers (2017–2019) ===
On July 10, 2017, Teodosić signed a two-year, $12.3 million contract with the Los Angeles Clippers, with the second year being a player option. During the NBA pre-season games, Teodosić showed potential as an above-average passer in the NBA.

On October 19, 2017, Teodosić made his NBA debut against the Los Angeles Lakers, recording 6 points and 6 assists. In the second game of 2017–18 season against the Phoenix Suns, Teodosić suffered a plantar fascia injury in his left foot and was put out indefinitely due to the unpredictability of the recovery time for such injury. On December 11, he returned on the court after 22 games of absence, against the Toronto Raptors, scoring 12 points and grabbing 7 rebounds in a 96–91 home victory. In his first NBA season, battling with persistent plantar fasciitis injury, he averaged 9.5 points, 4.6 assists and 2.8 rebounds over 45 games, while shooting 41.9% from the field.

On June 24, 2018, he exercised his player option with the Clippers for the 2018–19 season. On February 7, 2019, he was waived by the Clippers.

=== Virtus Bologna (2019–2023) ===
==== 2019–20 season ====
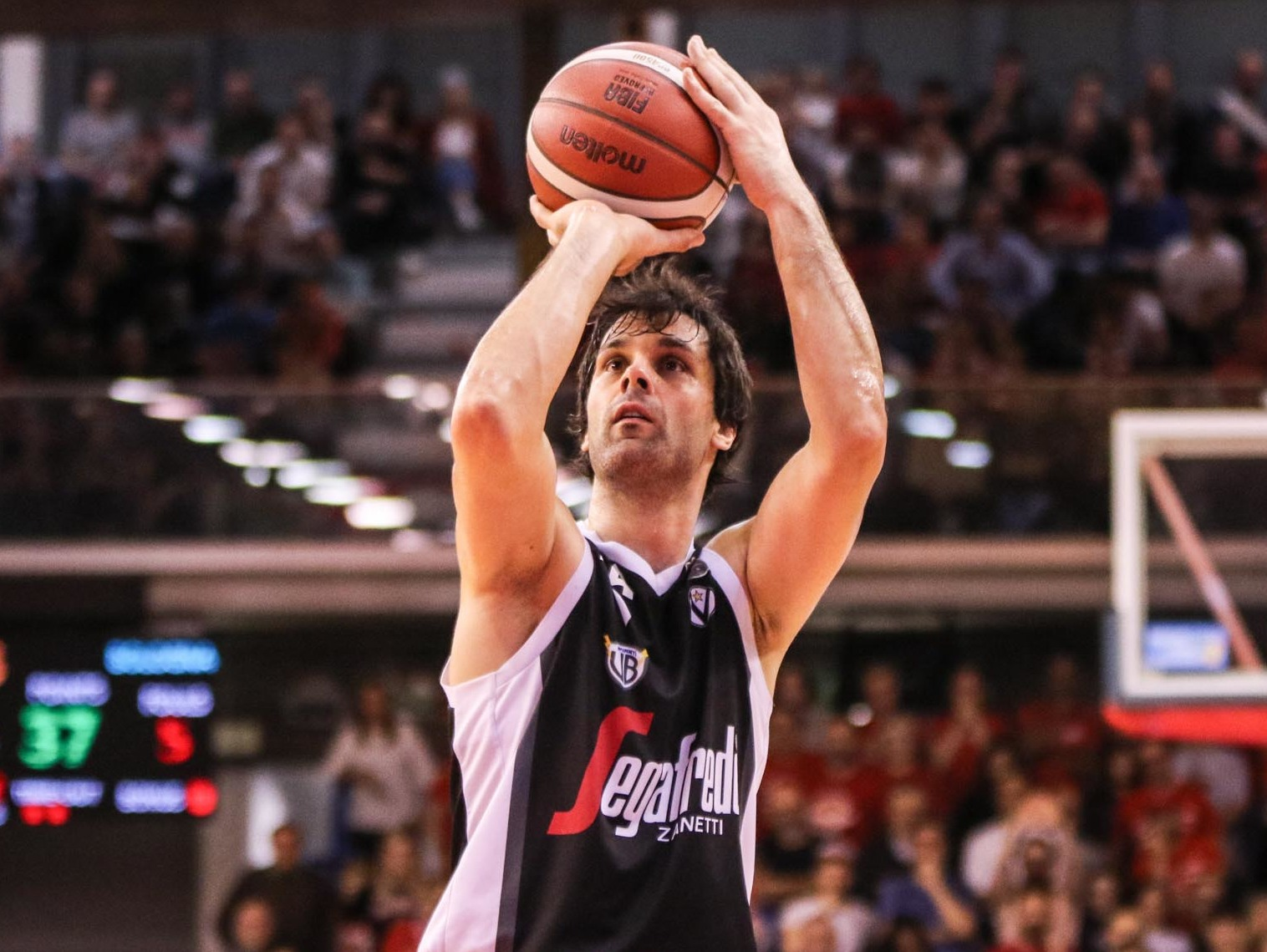
Teodosić with Virtus

On July 13, 2019, Teodosić signed a three-year deal with Virtus Bologna of the Italian Lega Basket Serie A, joining his national team head coach Aleksandar Đorđević.

On August 10, 2019, while representing Serbia in a friendly game versus Lithuania as part of preparations for the 2019 FIBA Basketball World Cup, Teodosić renewed the plantar fascia injury with which he was dealing while being two seasons with the Los Angeles Clippers. He joined his new Italian team in October, with an outstanding performance against Reyer Venezia.

In December 2019, with Virtus placing first in its group with the best record of the entire competition, Teodosić was awarded MVP of EuroCup's regular season.

On 7 April 2020, after more than a month of suspension, the Italian Basketball Federation officially ended the 2019–20 season, due to the COVID-19 pandemic that severely hit Italy. Virtus ended the season first, with 18 wins and only 2 defeats, but the title was not assigned. On 5 May, the EuroCup season ended too. As the season was concluded, Teodosić appeared in 32 games combined in the Italian League and EuroCup, averaging 16.6 points per game.

==== 2020–21 season ====
In the following 2020–21 season, Teodosić was again named EuroCup Regular Season MVP and became the first player to win the award in consecutive seasons. In April 2021, despite a winning record of 19–2, Virtus was defeated in the EuroCup's semifinals by UNICS Kazan. However, the season ended with a great success. In fact, after having knocked out 3–0 both Basket Treviso in the quarterfinals and New Basket Brindisi in the semifinals, on 11 June Virtus defeated 4–0 its historic rival Olimpia Milano in the national finals, winning its 16th national title and the first one after twenty years. Teodosić was appointed Finals MVP. Teodosić averaged 15.4 points and 6.9 assists over 19 EuroCup games for which he was named to the All-EuroCup Team. In the Italian League, over 27 games he averaged 12.7 points and 6.7 assists while shooting 42.8% from the field.

==== 2021–22 season ====
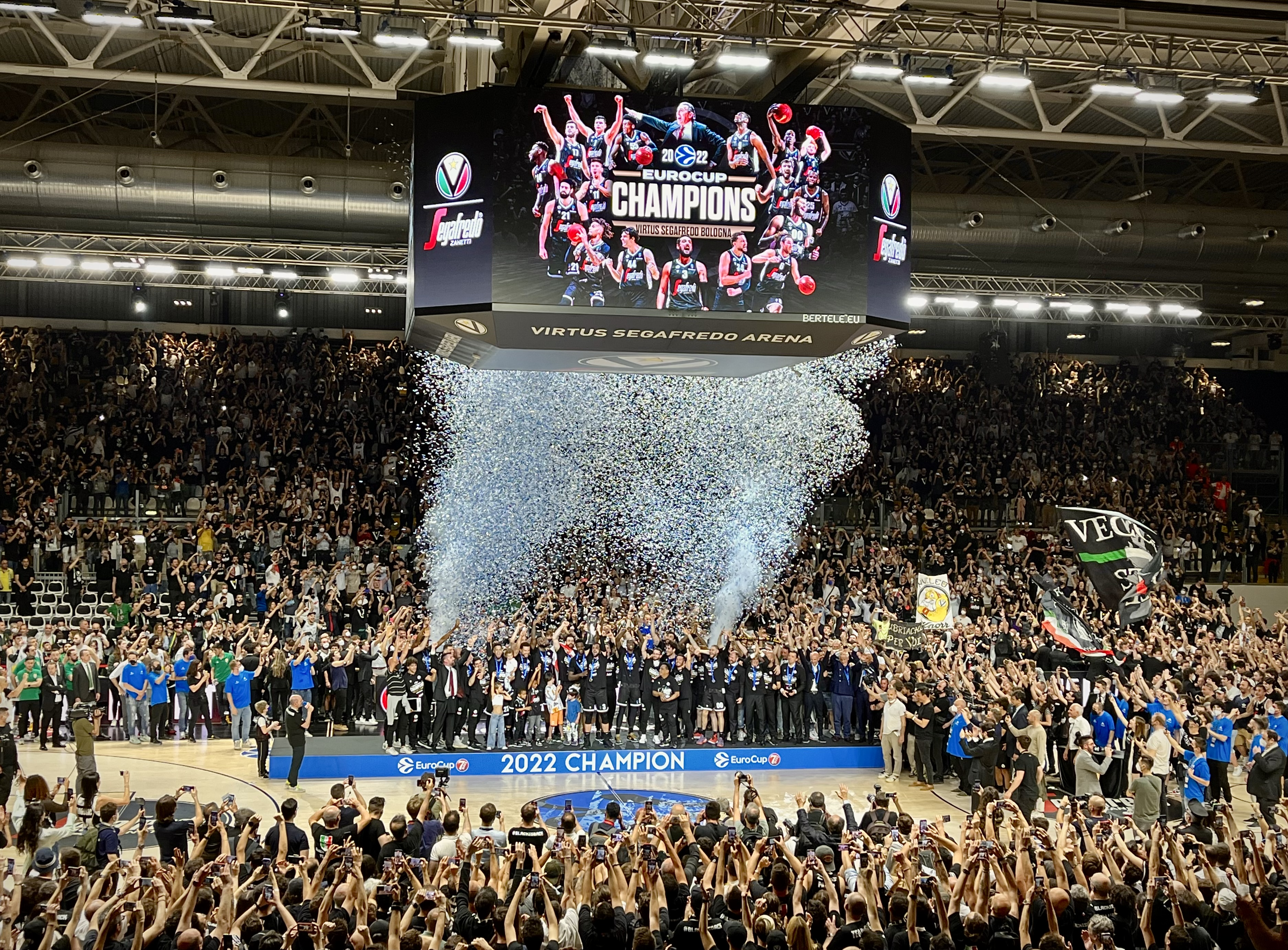
Team and fans celebrating after the victory of the EuroCup on 11 May 2022

On 8 July 2021, Teodosić extended his contract with the club, signing a two-year deal. On 21 September, the team won its second Supercup, defeating Olimpia Milano 90–84. Moreover, after having ousted Lietkabelis, Ulm and Valencia in the first three rounds of the playoffs, on 11 May 2022, Virtus defeated Frutti Extra Bursaspor by 80–67 at the Segafredo Arena, winning its first EuroCup and qualifying for the EuroLeague after 14 years. At the end of the game, Teodosić, was appointed MVP of the final. However, despite having ended the regular season at the first place and having ousted 3–0 both Pesaro and Tortona in the first two rounds of playoffs, Virtus was defeated 4–2 in the national finals by Olimpia Milan.

==== 2022–23 season ====
On 29 September 2022, after having ousted Olimpia Milano in the semifinals, Virtus won its third Supercup, defeating 72–69 Banco di Sardegna Sassari and achieving a back-to-back, following the 2021 trophy. However, Teodosić did not play due to an injury. However, despite good premises Virtus ended the EuroLeague season at the 14th place, thus it did not qualify for the playoffs. Moreover, the team was defeated in the Italian Basketball Cup final by Brescia. In June, after having ousted 3–0 both Brindisi and Tortona, Virtus was defeated 4–3 by Olimpia Milan in the national finals, following a series which was widely regarded among the best in the latest years of Italian basketball. On July 11, 2023, Teodosić amicably parted ways with the Italian club after four seasons together, which saw the Black V returning to the top of European basketball after decades. With the Serbian star, Virtus won its 16th title in 2021, reached the national finals three times in a row, and also won the EuroCup in 2022 and two Supercups.

=== Crvena zvezda (2023–2025) ===
On July 11, 2023, Teodosić officially returned to his home country, signing for childhood love KK Crvena zvezda, the club he supports.

On June 26, 2025, Teodosić announced his retirement from basketball.

== National team career ==
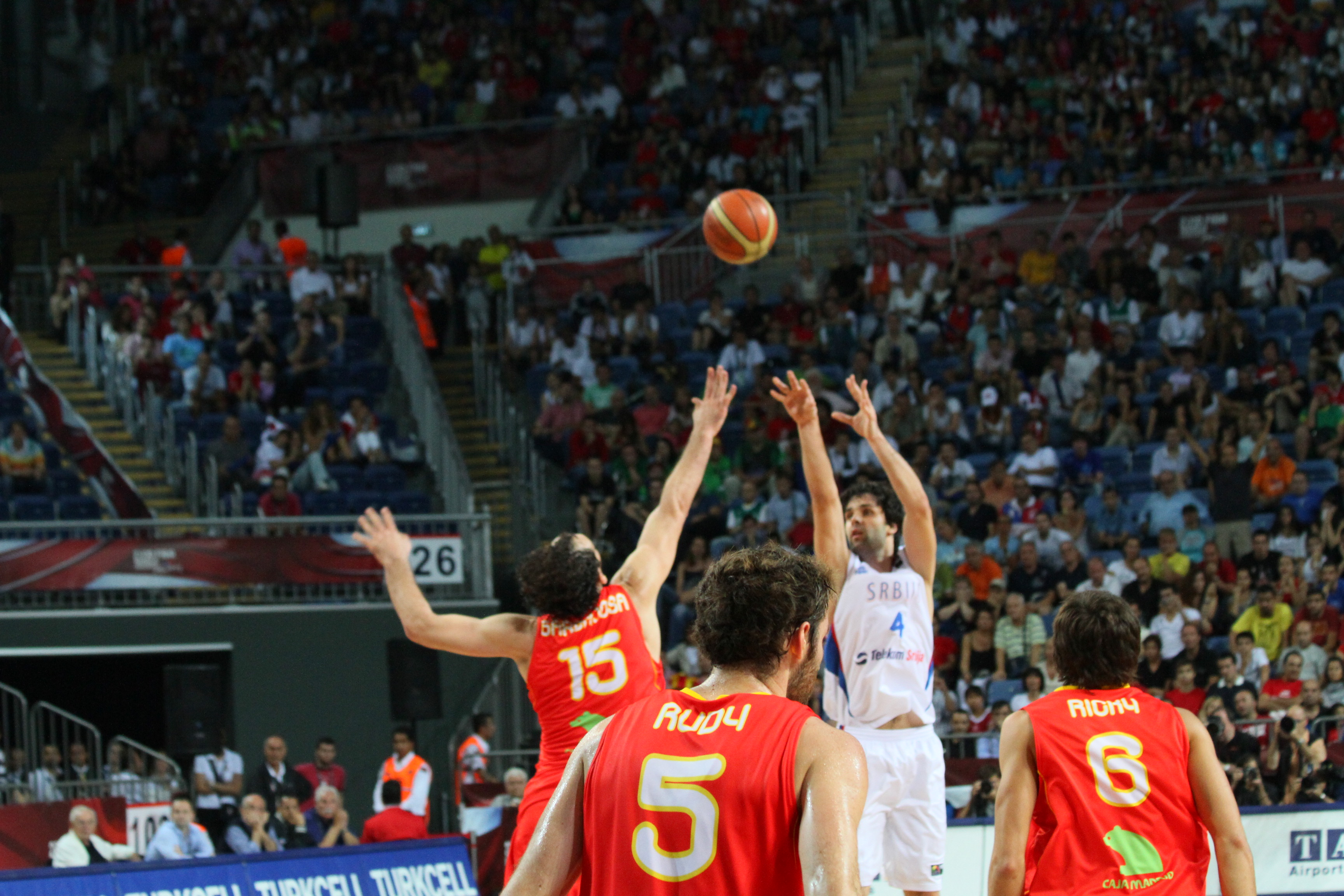
Teodosić's game-winning 3-pointer over Jorge Garbajosa during the 2010 FIBA World Championship quarterfinal versus Spain.

Teodosić was a member of the Serbian junior national teams. Playing with Serbia's junior national teams, he won the gold medal at the 2003 FIBA Europe Under-16 Championship. He also won the gold medal at the 2005 FIBA Europe Under-18 Championship. He was named the MVP of the 2007 FIBA Europe Under-20 Championship, where he also won the gold medal.

He currently plays for the Serbia national basketball senior team. With the senior men's Serbia national team, he played at the EuroBasket 2007. At the EuroBasket 2009, he reached the final with Serbia, and was named to the All-Tournament Team.

In 2010, Teodosić was named to the Serbian roster for the 2010 FIBA World Championship. After being suspended for a brawl in a friendly game against Greece, Teodosić made a game-winning three-point field goal from about nine meters distance in the quarterfinals, sending Serbia into the semi-finals with a 92–89 upset of Spain. He was also named to the All-Tournament Team.

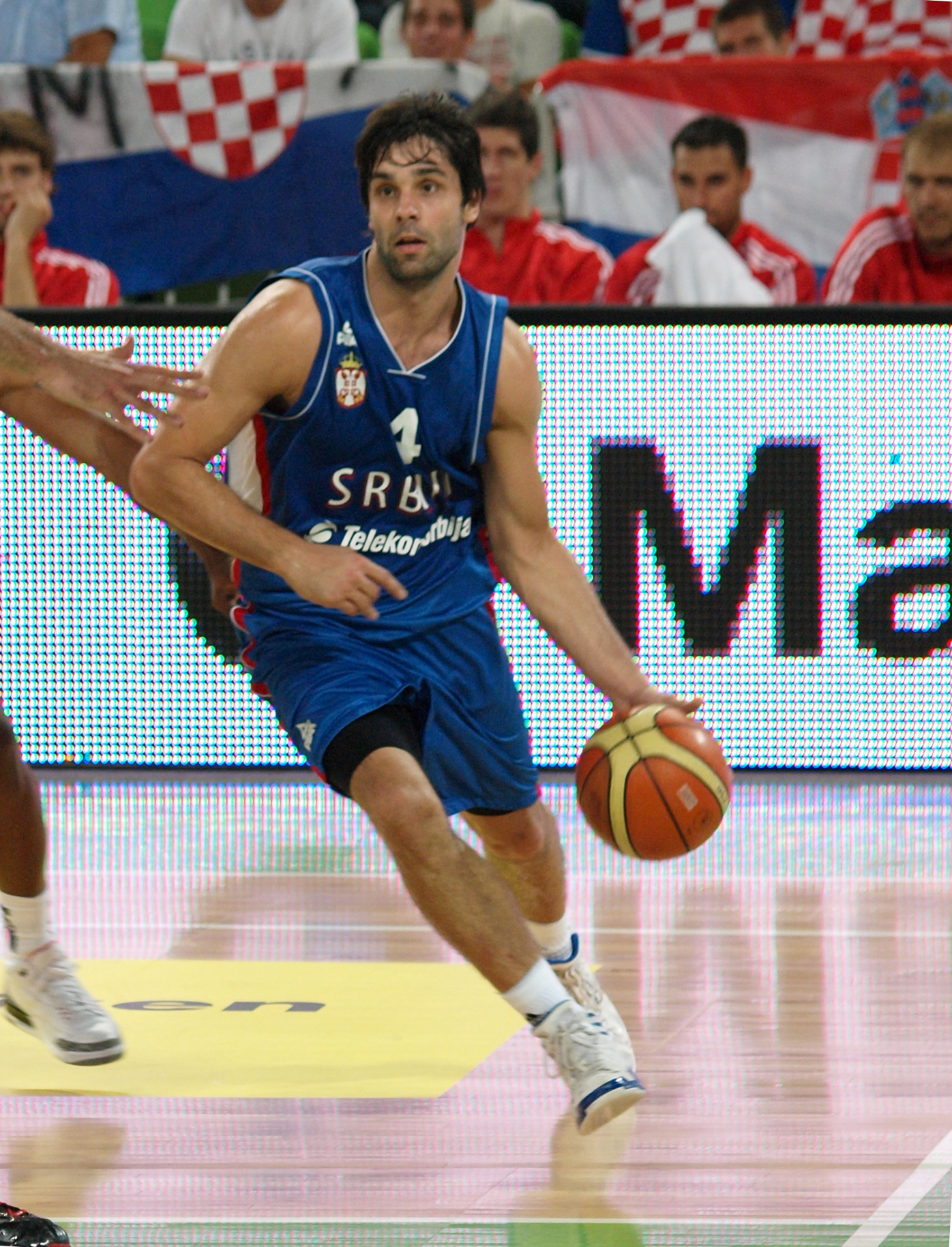
Teodosić with Serbia in 2011

He was also a part of the team at the EuroBasket 2011, in Lithuania, which took eighth place.

Teodosić was a member of the Serbian roster that won the silver medal at the 2014 FIBA Basketball World Cup, under head coach Aleksandar Đorđević. He was also named to the All-Tournament Team, as he averaged 13.6 points and 4.4 assists per game, over 9 tournament games.

He captained the senior Serbia national team for the first time in his career at the EuroBasket 2015. In the first phase of the tournament, Serbia dominated Group B, with a 5–0 record, and then eliminated Finland and the Czech Republic in the round of 16 and quarterfinal games, respectively. However, they were stopped in the semi-final game by Lithuania 67–64, and Serbia eventually lost to the tournament's host team, France, in the bronze-medal game, by a score of 81–68. Over 9 tournament games, Teodosić averaged 11.8 points, 7.1 assists and 2.7 rebounds per game, on 34.1% shooting from the field overall and 22.2% shooting from the three-point line.

Teodosić represented Serbia at the 2016 Summer Olympics where they won the silver medal, after losing to the United States in the final game with 96–66.

== Personal life ==
Born to father Miodrag and mother Zorana, Teodosić has an older brother, Jovan, who is also a professional basketball player in Serbia. During an interview, Teodosić cited that he is very proud of his hometown, Valjevo. He is an avid Red Star fan. In 2008, Teodosić began dating Serbian volleyball player Maja Ognjenović. They got engaged in 2010, only to break up two years later.

On June 25, 2017, he married Serbian actress Jelisaveta Orašanin, with whom he has a son and a daughter. The best man was Marko Pantelić, a former Serbian football player.

Teodosić stated that he wears the number 4 jersey because his favorite player during childhood was Dejan Bodiroga.

== Career statistics ==
Legend
GP	Games played	GS	Games started	MPG	Minutes per game
FG%	Field-goal percentage	3P%	3-point field-goal percentage	FT%	Free-throw percentage
RPG	Rebounds per game	APG	Assists per game	SPG	Steals per game
BPG	Blocks per game	PPG	Points per game	PIR	Performance index rating
**Bold**	Career high

=== EuroLeague ===
†	Denotes season in which Teodosić won the EuroLeague
*	Led the league

Year	Team	GP	GS	MPG	FG%	3P%	FT%	RPG	APG	SPG	BPG	PPG	PIR
2007–08	Olympiacos	23	7	19.5	.396	.273	.833	2.1	2.0	.7	—	5.2	5.1
2008–09	Olympiacos	17	10	14.5	.333	.353	**1.000**	.9	1.7	.5	—	3.3	2.0
2009–10	Olympiacos	22*	21	**30.1**	**.489**	.426	.892	2.5	4.9	**1.8**	**.2**	13.4	16.8
2010–11	Olympiacos	18	16	25.5	.327	.290	.898	2.7	3.6	.7	.1	10.9	10.7
2011–12	CSKA Moscow	22	20	26.5	.432	.361	.827	2.7	5.0	.6	—	10.4	11.3
2012–13	CSKA Moscow	**30**	**29**	29.7	.457	.377	.823	**2.8**	4.9	1.0	.1	12.7	13.2
2013–14	CSKA Moscow	23	16	24.9	.406	.347	.927	2.5	4.0	.5	—	10.7	10.2
2014–15	CSKA Moscow	24	8	28.2	.431	.405	.866	**2.8**	**7.0***	.8	—	14.8	15.9
2015–16†	CSKA Moscow	29	0	26.8	.468	**.428***	.884	2.7	5.7	.9	—	**16.1**	**17.8**
2016–17	CSKA Moscow	29	6	27.6	.444	.381*	.897	2.1	6.8*	.6	.0	**16.1**	17.1
2022–23	Virtus Bologna	26	9	19.5	.404	.394	.897	1.6	6.0	.6	.1	10.3	10.5
2023–24	Crvena zvezda	27	4	21.1	.378	.340	.819	2.0	5.9	.7	.1	9.4	10.9
2024–25	Crvena zvezda	19	0	12.3	.347	.352	.826	.9	2.7	.3	.1	4.7	3.9
Career		309	146	24.1	.423	.374	.872	2.2	4.8	.8	.1	11.1	11.8

=== EuroCup ===
*	Led the league

Year	Team	GP	GS	MPG	FG%	3P%	FT%	RPG	APG	SPG	BPG	PPG	PIR
2004–05	FMP	1	0	14.0	.333	.000	.667	1.0	1.0	—	—	4.0	1.0
2006–07	FMP	16	1	18.9	**.524**	**.426**	.796	2.1	2.9	**1.2**	.1	7.8	10.9
2019–20	Virtus Bologna	15	5	26.3	.479	.406	**.880**	2.7	5.5	.5	**.3**	**17.8***	18.8
2020–21	Virtus Bologna	**19**	9	**27.5**	.443	.325	.862	**3.1**	6.9	.8	—	15.4	**19.1**
2021–22†	Virtus Bologna	15	**12**	24.1	.411	.345	.864	2.0	**7.9***	.5	.1	11.5	15.7
Career		66	27	24.9	.432	.365	.854	2.5	5.8	.7	.1	13.0	16.0

=== NBA ===
==== Regular season ====
Year	Team	GP	GS	MPG	FG%	3P%	FT%	RPG	APG	SPG	BPG	PPG
2017–18	L.A. Clippers	**45**	**36**	**25.2**	.419	**.379**	**.848**	**2.8**	**4.6**	**.5**	**.1**	**9.5**
2018–19	L.A. Clippers	15	0	10.0	**.425**	.370	.571	1.1	2.1	.2	**.1**	3.2
Career		60	36	21.4	.420	.378	.811	2.4	4.0	.4	.1	8.0

=== Domestic leagues ===
Year	Team	League	GP	MPG	FG%	3P%	FT%	RPG	APG	SPG	BPG	PPG
2004–05	(Serbia) Reflex	ABA	2	2.5	—	—	—	—	—	—	—	0.0
2005–06	(Serbia) Borac Čačak	YUBA	22	19.2	.361	.312	.734	2.0	1.9	1.0	.1	7.3
2006–07	(Serbia) Crvena zvezda	ABA	26	16.8	.455	.348	.764	1.5	2.1	.8	6.9	7.4
2007–08	(Greece) Olympiacos	HEBA A1	25	22.4	.425	.407	.840	2.3	3.0	.8	—	7.1
2008–09	(Greece) Olympiacos	HEBA A1	22	20.1	.580	.569	.686	1.8	2.5	.5	.1	7.9
2009–10	(Greece) Olympiacos	HEBA A1	25	26.6	.438	.381	.825	2.6	4.3	1.0	.2	9.8
2010–11	(Greece) Olympiacos	HEBA A1	21	21.0	.442	.353	.857	2.2	4.9	.9	—	10.2
2011–12	(Russia) CSKA Moscow	RPBL	21	23.3	.435	.383	.902	2.6	5.0	.4	.1	8.6
2011–12	(Russia) CSKA Moscow	VTBUL	15	22.9	.468	.413	.829	2.6	4.5	.8	.1	8.1
2012–13	(Russia) CSKA Moscow	RPBL	15	24.9	.492	.417	.929	2.8	4.3	1.2	.1	13.0
2012–13	(Russia) CSKA Moscow	VTBUL	19	24.2	.427	.365	.953	2.9	3.7	1.0	.0	10.2
2013–14	(Russia) CSKA Moscow	VTBUL	24	28.0	.421	.437	.891	2.6	5.4	1.1	.1	12.7
2014–15	(Russia) CSKA Moscow	VTBUL	31	23.3	.479	.424	.836	2.2	5.7	.9	.1	12.0
2015–16	(Russia) CSKA Moscow	VTBUL	34	23.3	.490	.421	.900	2.1	5.7	.7	.1	13.3
2016–17	(Russia) CSKA Moscow	VTBUL	21	21.6	.460	.406	.839	2.4	5.9	.6	.1	11.3
2019–20	(Italy) Virtus Bologna	LBA	18	24.8	.416	.339	.857	1.9	6.1	.9	.1	15.1
2020–21	(Italy) Virtus Bologna	LBA	37	24.2	.442	.370	.805	2.5	6.5	.8	.2	13.9
2021–22	(Italy) Virtus Bologna	LBA	31	22.2	.447	.476	.885	2.1	6.1	.4	.1	10.2
2022–23	(Italy) Virtus Bologna	LBA	23	21.3	.430	.404	.814	1.0	4.8	.4	.2	9.7
2023–24	(Serbia) Crvena zvezda	KLS	3	23.7	.391	.182	.750	4.0	6.7	.7	—	7.7
2023–24	(Serbia) Crvena zvezda	ABA	24	19.2	.373	.357	.902	1.7	5.0	.5	.1	7.7
2024–25	(Serbia) Crvena zvezda	ABA	18	14.4	.355	.383	.833	1.8	4.3	.3	.2	4.0

== Awards and accomplishments ==
=== Club ===
FMP

- Serbian Cup: 2004–05, 2006–07

Olympiacos

- Greek Cup: 2009–10, 2010–11

CSKA Moscow

- EuroLeague: 2015–16
- VTB United League: 2011–12, 2012–13, 2013–14, 2014–15, 2015–16, 2016–17
- Russian Championship: 2011–12, 2012–13

Virtus Bologna

- Lega Basket Serie A: 2020–21
- EuroCup: 2021–22

Crvena Zvezda

- ABA League: 2023–24
- Serbian Cup: 2023–24, 2024–25

=== Individual ===
- FIBA World Cup All-Tournament Team: 2010, 2014
- FIBA EuroBasket All-Tournament Team: 2009
- FIBA Europe Under-20 Championship: All-Tournament Team: 2007
- FIBA Europe Under-20 Championship: MVP: 2007
- 2× Greek Cup Finals MVP: 2010, 2011
- 2× Greek Cup Finals Top Scorer: 2010, 2011
- EuroLeague MVP: 2010
- FIBA Europe Player of the Year Award: 2010
- 3× All-EuroLeague First Team: 2010, 2015, 2016
- 3× All-EuroLeague Second Team: 2012, 2013, 2017
- 5× EuroLeague MVP of the Round
- 2× VTB Playoffs MVP: 2014, 2016
- EuroCup Regular Season MVP: 2020
- 2× All-EuroCup First Team 2021, 2022
- All-Lega Serie A First Team: 2020
- Lega Serie A Finals MVP: 2021
- All-ABA League Team: 2024
- Serbian Cup MVP: 2024
- FIBA Europe Player of the Year: 2010
- Euroscar Player of the Year: 2016
- Serbian Player of the Year: 2016
- VTB United League Hall of Fame: 2019

== See also ==
- List of Olympic medalists in basketball
- List of Serbian NBA players

Sporting positions
Preceded by Nenad Krstić	Serbia captain 2015–2017	Succeeded by Milan Mačvan
