= Maciej Lampe =

Polish basketball player (born 1985)

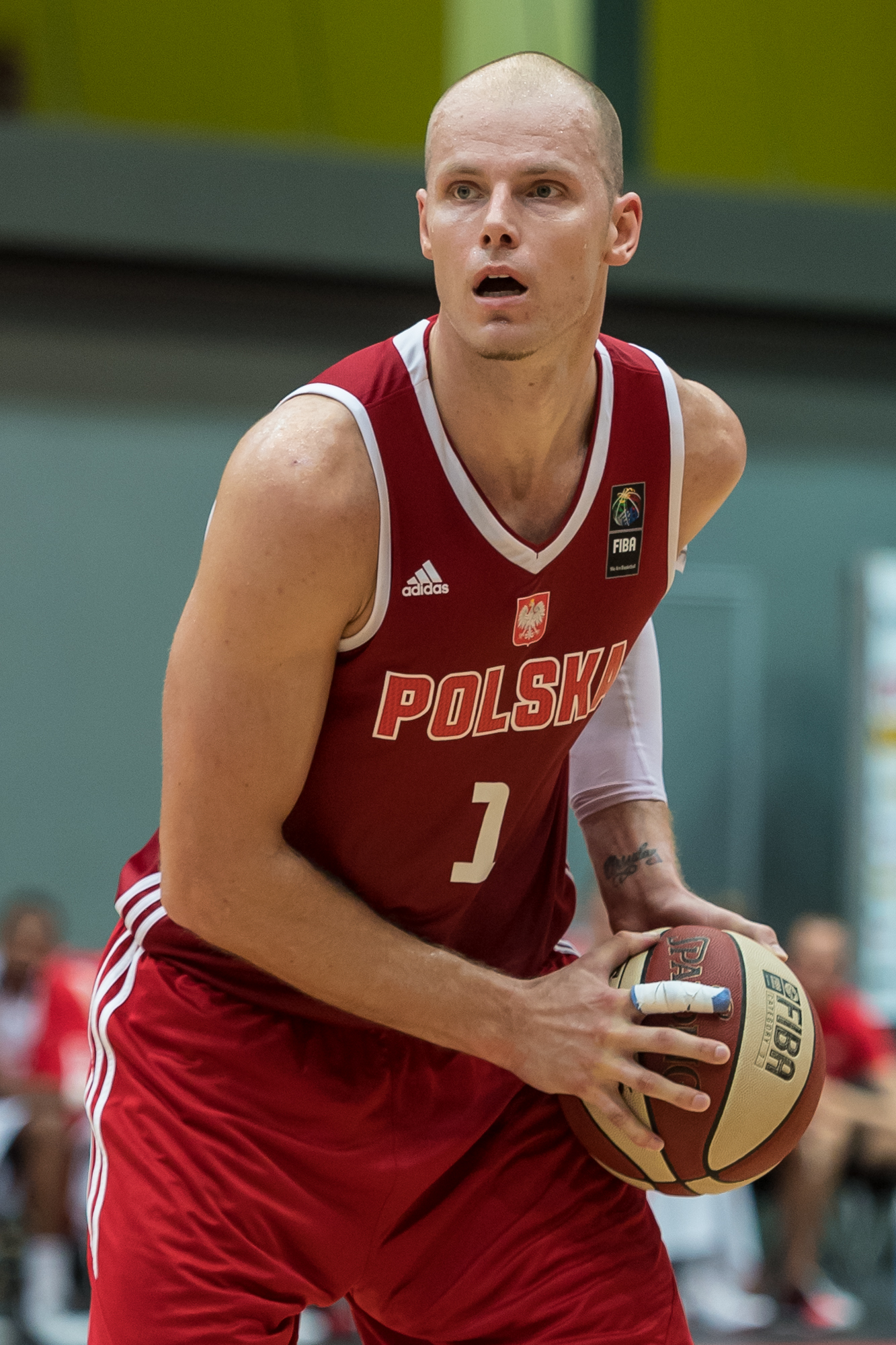
- Lampe playing for the Poland national team

Personal information
- Born: February 5, 1985 (age 41) Łódź, Poland
- Listed height: 6 ft 11 in (2.11 m)
- Listed weight: 275 lb (125 kg)

Career information
- NBA draft: 2003: 2nd round, 30th overall pick
- Drafted by: New York Knicks
- Playing career: 2001–2021
- Position: Power forward / center

Career history
- 2001–2003: Real Madrid
- 2001–2002: →Real Madrid B
- 2002–2003: →Universidad Complutense
- 2003–2004: New York Knicks
- 2004–2005: Phoenix Suns
- 2005–2006: New Orleans Hornets (Note: During the 2005–06 and 2006–07 seasons, the team was known as the New Orleans/Oklahoma City Hornets during their temporary relocation to Oklahoma City due to Hurricane Katrina.)
- 2006: Houston Rockets
- 2006: Dynamo St. Petersburg
- 2006–2009: Khimki
- 2009–2010: Maccabi Electra Tel Aviv
- 2010–2011: UNICS Kazan
- 2011–2013: Caja Laboral
- 2013–2015: FC Barcelona
- 2015–2016: Beşiktaş Sompo Japan
- 2016–2017: Shenzhen Leopards
- 2017–2018: Qingdao Eagles
- 2018–2019: Jilin Northeast Tigers
- 2019-2020: Al Manama
- 2020–2021: Wilki Morskie Szczecin
- 2021: CSP Limoges

Career highlights
- EuroCup champion (2011); All-EuroCup First Team (2011); Liga ACB champion (2014); Russian Cup winner (2008); Russian Cup MVP (2008); All-Russian League First Team (2011); Russian League MVP (2011); All-Russian League Second Team (2009); RBSL All-Star (2016)
- Stats at NBA.com
- Stats at Basketball Reference

Maciej Bolesław Lampe (born February 5, 1985) is a Polish former professional basketball player. Standing at 6 ft 11 in (2.11 m), he played at the power forward and center positions.

== Professional career ==
=== Sweden and Spain ===
Originally from Łódź, Poland, Lampe grew up in Stockholm, Sweden. He played briefly for Real Madrid in the Spanish ACB League before being sent on loan to Universidad Complutense of the LEB, the second division level in Spain, to receive more playing time.

=== NBA ===
Lampe was selected by the NBA club the New York Knicks in the second round (30th overall) of the 2003 NBA draft as an early entry candidate, despite having been projected as a top five lottery pick. Lampe was elected to the 2003 Reebok Rocky Mountain Revue All-Revue Team after averaging 17.2 points and 7.0 rebounds in 32.4 minutes for the Knicks' summer league team. Lampe was traded to the Phoenix Suns on January 5, 2004, deal, and at the time, he became the youngest player in Suns history to appear in a regular season game, as well as the first Suns player to play while being 18 years old.

In January 2005, he got traded for the second time in his NBA career, this time to the New Orleans/Oklahoma City Hornets. On February 13, 2006, he was traded to the Houston Rockets for point guard Moochie Norris, making the Rockets his fourth NBA club. He played the total number of 61 games in NBA. He holds NBA career averages of 3.4 points per game, 2.2 rebounds per game, and 0.3 assists per game.

Lampe's final NBA game was played on April 4, 2006, in a 87–104 loss to the Seattle SuperSonics where he recorded 1 rebound in only 2 and half minutes of playing time. In 2010, he was selected by the Cleveland Cavaliers to play on the Summer League team.

==== NBA transactions ====
- June 26, 2003 – Selected with the 30th pick by the New York Knicks (the pick originally belonged to the Denver Nuggets and was acquired by the Knicks in the Marcus Camby deal).
- August 13, 2003 – Signed a 3-year, $2.9 million contract with the Knicks
- January 5, 2004 – Traded with Antonio McDyess, Howard Eisley, Charlie Ward, rights to Miloš Vujanić, 2004 first-round draft pick (used to select Kirk Snyder), future first-round draft pick (used in 2010 to select Gordon Hayward) and $3 million to the Phoenix Suns for Stephon Marbury, Penny Hardaway and Cezary Trybański.
- January 21, 2005 – Traded with Casey Jacobsen and Jackson Vroman to the New Orleans Hornets for Jim Jackson and 2005 second-round draft pick (used to select Marcin Gortat).
- February 13, 2006 – Traded to the Houston Rockets for Moochie Norris.

=== Russia ===
Lampe signed a one-year deal with the ULEB Cup (now called EuroCup) club Dynamo Saint Petersburg, however the team went bankrupt shortly thereafter. The bankrupt Dynamo squad was thrown out of the Russian Superleague A one day before the start of the season. Thus, Lampe moved to Khimki. In February 2008, Khimki beat CSKA Moscow in the Russian Cup final and Lampe was awarded the best player (MVP) of the cup final. He then signed a three-year contract extension with Khimki.

Lampe returned to Russia in January 2010, signing with UNICS Kazan. He was voted the 2010–11 season's Russian PBL MVP for the regular season.

=== Israel ===
Lampe signed a one-year deal with an option for another season with the Israeli Super League club Maccabi Tel Aviv in July 2009.

=== Spain ===
In July 2011 he signed with Caja Laboral Vitoria for two seasons. In December 2012, Lampe was named the MVP of the month of December in the 2012–13 EuroLeague.

In August 2013, he signed a three-year contract with FC Barcelona. Barcelona paid Baskonia 1.5 million euros for the transfer.

=== China ===
In July 2016, Lampe signed with the Shenzhen Leopards. He was replaced on the roster before the 2017–18 season with Jared Sullinger because of injury. In November 2017, Lampe signed with the Qingdao Eagles.

On August 19, 2019, he has signed with Sichuan Blue Whales of the Chinese Basketball Association. On October 16, 2019, replaced by Thomas Robinson.

=== Poland ===
On December 31, 2020, he has signed with Wilki Morskie Szczecin of the PLK.

=== Taiwan ===
On September 9, 2021, he has signed with TaiwanBeer HeroBears of the T1 League. On December 24, Lampe took a plane to Spain for recovery.

== Career statistics ==
Legend
GP	Games played	GS	Games started	MPG	Minutes per game
FG%	Field-goal percentage	3P%	3-point field-goal percentage	FT%	Free-throw percentage
RPG	Rebounds per game	APG	Assists per game	SPG	Steals per game
BPG	Blocks per game	PPG	Points per game	PIR	Performance index rating
**Bold**	Career high

=== EuroLeague ===
Year	Team	GP	GS	MPG	FG%	3P%	FT%	RPG	APG	SPG	BPG	PPG	PIR
2001–02	Real Madrid	3	0	7.4	.500	**.500**	.000	.7	.0	.0	.0	3.0	.0
2002–03	Real Madrid	4	0	9.8	.333	.000	.750	2.8	.0	.0	.0	4.0	3.5
2009–10	Maccabi	8	4	17.3	.444	.389	**.900**	3.8	**.9**	.5	.3	8.0	8.4
2012–13	Caja Laboral	**28**	**24**	**24.6**	.484	.318	.765	**6.1**	.8	**.6**	**.5**	**13.9**	**13.8**
2013–14	Barcelona	19	6	14.4	**.505**	.333	.724	3.3	.7	.2	.4	7.0	7.1
2014–15	Barcelona	24	3	13.3	.425	.238	.814	3.8	.6	.3	.4	6.2	7.1
Career		86	37	17.3	.468	.308	.777	4.3	.7	.3	.4	8.8	8.5

=== NBA ===
==== Regular season ====
Year	Team	GP	GS	MPG	FG%	3P%	FT%	RPG	APG	SPG	BPG	PPG
2003–04	Phoenix	**21**	0	10.7	**.489**	.000	**.769**	2.1	.4	.1	.1	**4.6**
2004–05	Phoenix	16	0	7.4	.347	**.667**	.667	2.0	.1	.1	.1	2.8
2004–05	New Orleans	**21**	0	**12.4**	.386	.000	.700	**2.7**	.5	**.2**	**.2**	3.4
2005–06	New Orleans	2	0	8.0	.000	–	–	2.0	**1.0**	.0	.0	.0
2005–06	Houston	4	0	3.0	.286	–	.000	1.3	.0	.0	.0	1.0
Career		64	0	9.9	.407	.250	.676	2.2	.3	.1	.2	3.4

== National team career ==
Lampe has been a member of the senior Polish national basketball team. He played for Poland's national team at EuroBasket 2009.

== See also ==
- List of oldest and youngest National Basketball Association players
- List of youngest EuroLeague players
