= Victor Khryapa =

Russian basketball player (born 1982)

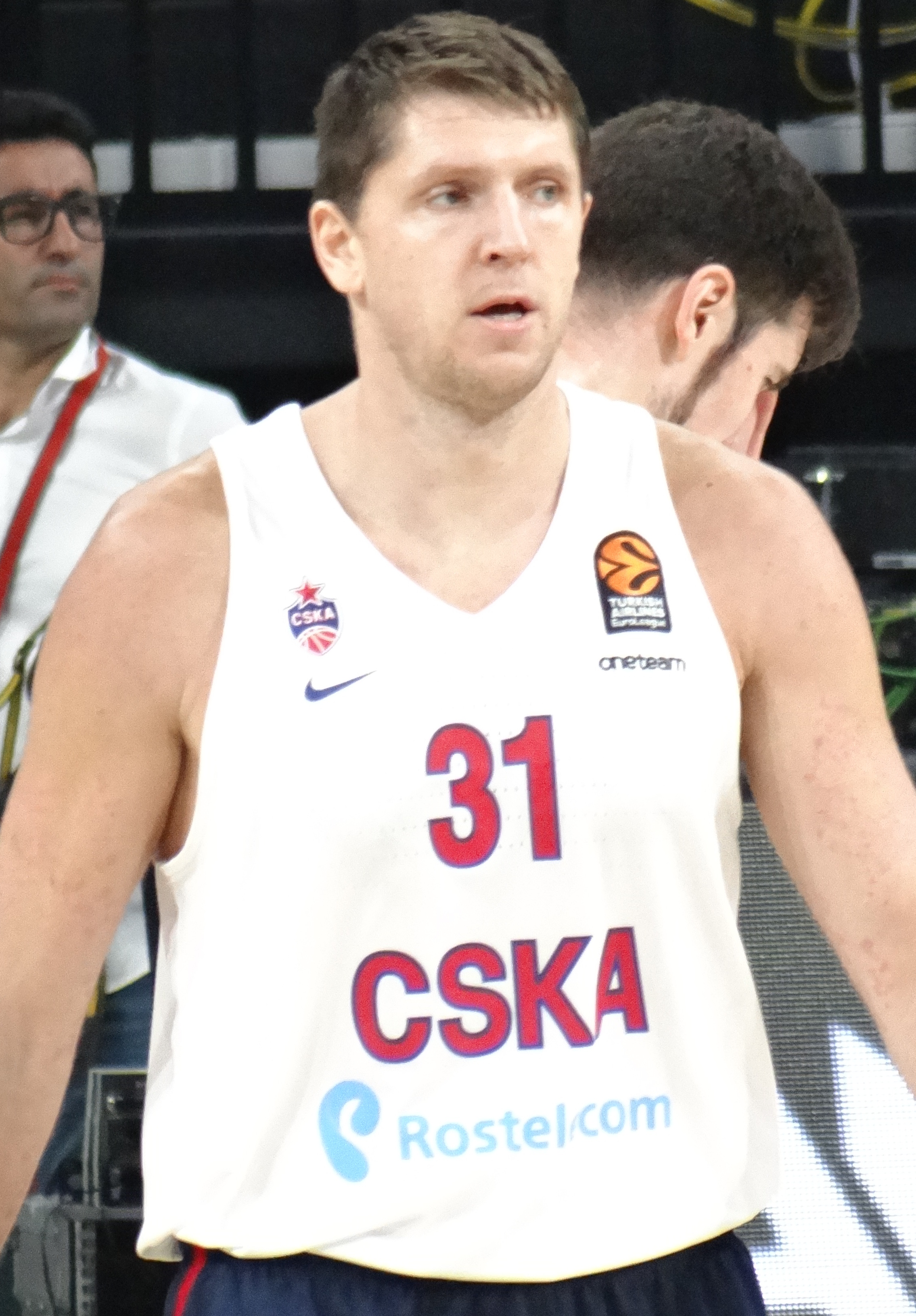
- Khryapa with CSKA Moscow in October 2017.

Personal information
- Born: August 3, 1982 (age 44) Kiev, Ukrainian SSR, Soviet Union
- Listed height: 6 ft 9 in (2.06 m)
- Listed weight: 235 lb (107 kg)

Career information
- NBA draft: 2004: 1st round, 22nd overall pick
- Drafted by: New Jersey Nets
- Playing career: 1999–2020
- Position: Power forward / small forward
- Number: 31, 38

Career history
- 1999–2000: Khimik Engels
- 2000–2002: Avtodor Saratov
- 2002–2004: CSKA Moscow
- 2004–2006: Portland Trail Blazers
- 2006–2007: Chicago Bulls
- 2007–2018: CSKA Moscow

Career highlights
- 2× EuroLeague champion (2008, 2016); All-EuroLeague First Team (2010); 2× All-EuroLeague Second Team (2013, 2014); EuroLeague Best Defender (2010); EuroLeague rebounding leader (2013); 8× VTB United League champion (2008, 2010, 2012–2017); 8× Russian League champion (2003, 2004, 2008–2013); Russian Cup winner (2010); VTB United League Hall of Fame (2019); VTB United League MVP (2010); Russian League MVP (2009); VTB United League Playoffs MVP (2013); Russian League Playoffs MVP (2011); All-VTB United League First Team (2013); VTB United League assists leader (2010); 2× All-Russian League First Team (2009, 2010); All-Russian League Symbolic Second Team (2012); Russian Cup MVP (2010)
- Stats at NBA.com
- Stats at Basketball Reference

Victor Vladimirovich Khryapa (also trans. Viktor; Russian: Виктор Владимирович Хряпа; born August 3, 1982) is a Russian former professional basketball player who spent the majority of his career playing for CSKA Moscow of the VTB United League. A versatile forward standing at 6 ft 9 in (2.06 m), he is a three-time All-EuroLeague selection and won the EuroLeague Best Defender award in 2010.

A regular member of the senior Russian former national basketball team, he was instrumental in their triumph at the EuroBasket 2007, where they won the gold medal. He also won two bronze medals at the EuroBasket 2011 and at the 2012 Summer Olympics.

== Professional career ==
=== Europe ===
Khryapa played for Khimik Engels in 1999–00, and for Avtodor Saratov in 2000–02. In 2002, Khryapa was signed by CSKA Moscow, with whom he won two Russian Championships in 2003 and 2004.

=== NBA ===
Khryapa was the 22nd overall selection of the 2004 NBA draft. He was chosen by the New Jersey Nets and then subsequently traded to the Portland Trail Blazers for Eddie Gill. Then on June 28, 2006, he was traded to the Chicago Bulls along with Tyrus Thomas, for the rights to LaMarcus Aldridge.

In February 2008, the Chicago Bulls bought out Khryapa's contract after the forward expressed frustration with his lack of playing time. He had appeared in just nine games in the 2007–08 NBA season to that point, averaging 3.6 points per game and 2.2 rebounds per game.

=== Return to Europe ===
Khryapa intended to return to Russia as a member of CSKA Moscow, and signed with his former club on February 12, 2008, on a four-and-a-half-year contract. With CSKA he won the Russian Championship in 2008, 2009, 2010 and 2011, the VTB United League Championship in 2010 and the EuroLeague Championship in 2008. In May 2014, he was named to the All-EuroLeague Second Team of the EuroLeague, the second consecutive in his career.

Khryapa missed the first half of 2014–15 season due to an ankle injury rehabilitation. On December 10, 2014, he underwent surgery which kept him off-the-court for three months. He returned to action in a game against Laboral Kutxa on March 5, 2015. CSKA Moscow has managed to advance to the EuroLeague Final Four for the fourth straight season, after eliminating Panathinaikos for the second straight season in the quarter-final series with a 3–1 series win. However, in the semifinal game, despite being dubbed by the media as an absolute favorite to advance, CSKA once again lost to Olympiacos. The final score was 70–68, after a great Olympiacos comeback in 4th quarter, led by Vassilis Spanoulis. CSKA Moscow eventually won the EuroLeague third place game, after defeating Fenerbahçe, by a score of 86–80. Over 10 EuroLeague games played, he averaged a career-low of 1.2 points, 1.8 rebounds, and 1 assist per game.

On July 23, 2015, he re-signed with CSKA for one more season. In June 2016, CSKA used team option to keep Khryapa in the club for yet another season. He officially parted ways with CSKA on June 26, 2018, after a ten-year second stint with the club.

== National team career ==
Khryapa was a member of the senior men's Russian national basketball team, winning the gold medal at the EuroBasket 2007. He also participated in the 2002 FIBA World Championship, the EuroBasket 2003, the EuroBasket 2005, and won a bronze medal at the EuroBasket 2011. He represented Russia in the 2008 Summer Olympics, as well as in the 2012 Summer Olympics, where Russia won another bronze medal. He was included on the Russian national team roster for the 2010 FIBA World Championship, but did not play due to an injury.

== Personal life ==
Khyapa's older brother, Nikolai Khryapa, was also a professional basketball player.

== Career statistics ==
Legend
GP	Games played	GS	Games started	MPG	Minutes per game
FG%	Field-goal percentage	3P%	3-point field-goal percentage	FT%	Free-throw percentage
RPG	Rebounds per game	APG	Assists per game	SPG	Steals per game
BPG	Blocks per game	PPG	Points per game	PIR	Performance index rating
**Bold**	Career high

=== NBA ===
==== Regular season ====
Year	Team	GP	GS	MPG	FG%	3P%	FT%	RPG	APG	SPG	BPG	PPG
2004–05	Portland	32	5	16.3	.435	**.364**	.548	3.4	.8	.6	**.6**	4.2
2005–06	Portland	**69**	**53**	**21.6**	**.462**	.333	.694	**4.4**	**1.3**	**.7**	.4	**5.8**
2006–07	Chicago	33	0	7.0	.386	.000	**.731**	1.7	.6	.3	.0	2.2
2007–08	Chicago	9	0	11.7	.387	.000	.571	2.2	.9	**.7**	.0	3.6
Career		143	58	16.4	.443	.292	.658	3.4	1.0	.6	.3	3.95

=== EuroLeague ===
†	Denotes season in which Khryapa won the EuroLeague
*	Led the league

Year	Team	GP	GS	MPG	FG%	3P%	FT%	RPG	APG	SPG	BPG	PPG	PIR
2002–03	CSKA Moscow	22	17	19.0	.500	.414	.750	5.1	1.1	1.0	**1.3**	4.7	9.3
2003–04	CSKA Moscow	20	17	17.8	.461	.268	.743	3.4	1.2	.9	1.0	5.3	7.5
2007–08†	CSKA Moscow	9	0	10.9	.367	.375	.500	2.2	.4	.4	.2	3.7	2.3
2008–09	CSKA Moscow	21	10	19.5	.557	.400	.720	4.9	1.4	1.3	1.0	6.6	10.7
2009–10	CSKA Moscow	22*	22*	**31.3**	.532	.418	.689	6.3	4.0	**2.0***	.9	10.1	15.3
2010–11	CSKA Moscow	3	0	19.0	.273	.333	**1.000**	5.0	2.3	1.0	.0	3.0	8.0
2011–12	CSKA Moscow	20	19	22.6	.454	.414	.816	4.0	3.3	.9	.5	8.2	10.0
2012–13	CSKA Moscow	26	26	27.8	.520	**.452**	.771	**7.3***	3.7	1.7	.8	**10.3**	**17.0**
2013–14	CSKA Moscow	28	**28**	23.8	.476	.385	.667	5.4	**4.3**	.9	.4	6.5	12.5
2014–15	CSKA Moscow	10	0	7.8	.250	.250	.833	1.8	1.0	.2	.6	1.2	3.0
2015–16†	CSKA Moscow	10	3	16.3	**.568**	.316	.444	3.7	1.8	.4	.8	6.0	8.8
2016–17	CSKA Moscow	**32**	11	13.4	.475	.184	.821	3.6	1.8	.8	.3	3.8	6.8
2017–18	CSKA Moscow	16	3	6.6	.475	.333	.500	1.4	.4	.3	.1	1.6	1.4
Career		240	156	19.4	.481	.372	.728	4.5	2.3	1.0	.7	6.0	9.6
