= Russian Professional Basketball League =

Men's basketball league

Professional Basketball League
- Formerly: Russian Super League 1
- Sport: Basketball
- Founded: 2010
- First season: 2010–11
- Folded: 2013
- No. of teams: 10
- Country: Russia
- Continent: FIBA Europe (Europe)
- Most titles: CSKA Moscow (3 titles)
- Level on pyramid: 1
- Related competitions: VTB United League; Russian Super League 1 Russian Cup
- Website: www.PBLeague.ru

The Professional Basketball League (Russian: Профессиональная баскетбольная лига (ПБЛ), romanized: Professionalnaya basketbolnaya liga), often abbreviated to the RPBL, was the pre-eminent men's professional basketball league in Russia, and the successor to the Russian Super League 1, which is now the second-tier division of the Russian basketball league system.

The PBL was the second version of the Russian Professional Basketball Championship.

== History ==
Established in 2010, the league contained 10 teams in its inaugural 2010–11 season. 9 of those teams participated in the 2009–10 season of Russian Super League 1, and the 10th team was Nizhny Novgorod.

The 2011–12 season featured 10 teams, like the inaugural season, however, Dynamo Moscow was replaced with the 2011 Russian Super League 1 champions Spartak Primorye.

=== Merging with VTB United League ===
In May 2012, all the PBL clubs gathered to decide which format would be used for the next season, and some club's directors raised the possibility of merging with the VTB United League, to produce greater competition between the Russian basketball clubs. They suggested that the new league would be named the Eastern European Professional Basketball League.

In July 2012, the Council of VTB United League gave a definitive decision. It was decided that the PBL league would continue for one more year, with some of the games of the VTB United League that took place between two Russian clubs being counted as PBL games. The first tier Russian clubs then replaced the PBL with the VTB United League as their new national domestic league, starting with the 2013–14 season.

== Champions ==
Season	Champions
2010–11	CSKA Moscow
2011–12	CSKA Moscow
2012–13	CSKA Moscow

== Awards winners ==
=== Most Valuable Player ===
- (Poland) Maciej Lampe: (2011)
- (United States) Davon Jefferson: (2012)
- (Serbia) Miloš Teodosić (2013)

=== Playoffs MVP ===
- (Russia) Victor Khryapa: (2011)
- (Russia) Alexey Shved: (2012)

== Topscorers ==
Year	Player	Team	PPG
2010-11	(United States) Tywain McKee	Triumph Lyubertsy	18.6
2011-12	(United States) Davon Jefferson	Triumph Lyubertsy	20.8
2012–13	(Russia) Sergey Karasev	Triumph Lyubertsy	317 (total)

Source: eurobasket.com

== Statistical leaders ==
=== Rebounds ===
Year	Player	Team	PPG
2010-11	(Kazakhstan) (Russia) Alexey Zhukanenko	Dynamo Moscow	7.4
2011-12	(United States) Cuthbert Victor	Spartak Primorye	8.1
2012–13	(Russia) Victor Khryapa	CSKA Moscow	113 (total)

=== Assists ===
Year	Player	Team	PPG
2010-11	(United States) Marcus Williams	Enisey Krasnoyarsk	8.6
2011-12	(United States) Aaron Miles	BC Krasnye Krylia	6.0
2012–13	(United States) Aaron Miles	BC Krasnye Krylia	96 (total)

Source: eurobasket.com

== Predecessor leagues ==
- USSR Premier League: (1923–1992)
- Russian Super League 1 (1st-tier): (1992–2010)

== Successor league ==
- VTB United League: (2008–present)

== See also ==
- Russian Professional Championship: (1991–present)
- Russian Super League 1: (1992–present)
- Russian Cup: (1999–present)
- VTB United League: (2008–present)
- USSR Premier League: (1923–1992)
- USSR Cup: (1949–1987)
- Russian basketball league system
- Basketball in Russia
- Russian Basketball All-Star Game
