= 2012–13 PBL season =

PBL
- Season: 2012–13
- Dates: 3 October 2012–12 May 2013
- Games played: 90
- Teams: 10

Finals
- Champions: CSKA Moscow (20th title)
- Runners-up: Khimki
- Third place: Spartak Saint Petersburg
- Fourth place: Lokomotiv Kuban

The 2012–13 Russian Professional Basketball League (PBL) was the third and last season of the Russian Professional League, and the 22nd overall season of the Russian Professional Championship. The season started on 3 October 2012 and ended 12 May 2013.

== Unification with VTB United League ==
In May 2012, all the PBL clubs gathered to decide which format would be used for the next season, and some of the club's directors raised the possibility of uniting with the VTB United League, in order to produce greater competition between the Russian basketball clubs. They suggested that the new league would be named the Eastern European Professional Basketball League.

In July 2012, the Council of VTB United League gave a definitive decision. It was decided that the PBL league would continue for one more year, with some of the games of the VTB United League that took place between two Russian clubs being counted as PBL games. The first tier Russian clubs then replaced the PBL with the VTB United League as their new national domestic league championship, starting with the 2013–14 season.

== Format ==
There were no league playoffs during this season. The team that finished first in the regular season standings was declared the league's champions. All teams met each other at home and away venues. In the regular season, each team played 18 games.

== Teams ==
Professional Basketball League 2012–13 – Club Locations

Team	Home City	Arena	Capacity
Triumph Lyubertsy	Lyubertsy	Triumph Sports Palace	4,000
Spartak Saint Petersburg	Saint Petersburg	Sibur Arena	7,044
Spartak Primorye	Vladivostok	SK Olimpiets	1,500
Krasnye Krylia	Samara	MTL Arena	3,500
CSKA Moscow	Moscow	Universal Sports Hall CSKA	5,500
Enisey	Krasnoyarsk	Arena Sever	4,100
Khimki	Khimki	Basketball Center	6,196
Lokomotiv Kuban	Krasnodar	Basket-Hall	7,500
Nizhny Novgorod	Nizhny Novgorod	Trade Union Sport Palace	5,600
UNICS	Kazan	Basket Hall Arena	7,500

== Regular season ==
Pos	Team	Pld	W	L	PF	PA	PD	Qualification or relegation
1	CSKA Moscow (C)	18	16	2	1414	1160	+254	Qualification for the Euroleague (Note: CSKA Moscow was automatically placed for the Euroleague as it is an A-licence holder, which guarantees participation.)
2	Khimki	18	13	5	1466	1369	+97	Qualification for the Euroleague qualifying rounds
3	Spartak Saint Petersburg	18	10	8	1264	1244	+20	Qualification for the Eurocup
4	Lokomotiv Kuban	18	9	9	1316	1340	−24	Qualification for the Euroleague (Note: Lokomotiv Kuban was qualified for the 2013–14 Euroleague as the winner of the 2012–13 Eurocup competition.)
5	Triumph Lyubertsy	18	8	10	1324	1377	−53	Qualification for the EuroChallenge
6	UNICS	18	8	10	1273	1253	+20	Qualification for the Eurocup
7	Krasnye Krylia	18	8	10	1265	127	+1138	Qualification for the EuroChallenge
8	Nizhny Novgorod	18	8	10	1301	1283	+18	Qualification for the Eurocup
9	Spartak Primorye	18	7	11	1255	1401	−146	
10	Enisey	18	3	15	1230	1404	−174	

Source: Eurobasket
(C) Champions

== See also ==
- 2012–13 VTB United League
