= 2010–11 PBL season =

PBL
- Season: 2010–11
- Duration: 9 October 2010 – 16 June 2011

Regular season
- Top seed: UNICS
- Season MVP: (Poland) Maciej Lampe
- Relegated: Dynamo Moscow

Finals
- Champions: CSKA Moscow (18th title)
- Runners-up: Khimki
- Third place: UNICS
- Fourth place: Lokomotiv Kuban
- Playoffs MVP: (Russia) Victor Khryapa

The 2010–11 Russian Professional Basketball League (PBL) was the first season of the Russian Professional League, and the 20th overall of the Russian Professional Championship. CSKA Moscow won the title, by beating Kimki Moscow Region 3–1 in the league's playoff Finals.

== Format ==
In the regular season, all ten teams played against each other three times so in the regular season, each team played 27 games.

== Teams ==
Professional Basketball League 2010–11 club locations
Moscow Region teams:
CSKA, Khimki, Triumph, Dynamo

Team	Home City	Arena	Capacity
Triumph Lyubertsy	Lyubertsy	Triumph Sports Palace	4,000
Spartak Saint Petersburg	Saint Petersburg	Sibur Arena	7,044
Dynamo Moscow	Moscow	Krylatskoye Sports Palace	5,000
Krasnye Krylia	Samara	MTL Arena	3,500
CSKA Moscow	Moscow	Universal Sports Hall CSKA	5,500
Enisey	Krasnoyarsk	Arena Sever	4,100
Khimki	Khimki	Basketball Center	6,196
Lokomotiv Kuban	Krasnodar	Basket-Hall	7,500
Nizhny Novgorod	Nizhny Novgorod	Trade Union Sport Palace	5,600
UNICS	Kazan	Basket Hall Arena	7,500

== Regular season ==
Pos	Team	Pld	W	L	PF	PA	PD	Qualification or relegation
1	UNICS	27	21	6	2188	1962	+226	Qualification for the playoffs
2	CSKA Moscow	27	18	9	2161	1925	+236	Qualification for the playoffs
3	Lokomotiv Kuban	27	17	10	2114	1956	+158	Qualification for the playoffs
4	Khimki	27	17	10	2261	2059	+202	Qualification for the playoffs
5	Spartak Saint Petersburg	27	17	10	2195	2122	+73	Qualification for the playoffs
6	Enisey	27	12	15	2114	2252	−138	Qualification for the playoffs
7	Krasnye Krylia	27	10	17	1987	2128	−141	Qualification for the playoffs
8	Nizhny Novgorod	27	10	17	1948	2122	−174	Qualification for the playoffs
9	Dynamo Moscow (Note: Dynamo Moscow was expelled from the PBL due to the club's difficult financial situation.) (R)	27	8	19	323	352	−29	Relegated to Super League
10	Triumph Lyubertsy	27	5	22	2048	2313	−265	

Source: Eurobasket
(R) Relegated

== Playoffs ==
=== Championship bracket ===
The quarterfinals were played in a best-of-three format, the semi- and finals were played in a best-of-five format.

Quarter-finals
1 UNICS	2
8 Nizhny Novgorod	1
4 Khimki	2
5 Spartak Saint Petersburg	1
2 CSKA Moscow	2
7 Krasnye Krylia	1
3 Lokomotiv Kuban	2
6 Enisey	1

Semi-finals
1 UNICS	2
4 Khimki	3
2 CSKA Moscow	3
3 Lokomotiv Kuban	0

Final
4 Khimki	1
2 CSKA Moscow	3
Third place
1 UNICS	3
3 Lokomotiv Kuban	0

=== Classification bracket ===
All losing teams from the quarter-finals in the championship bracket played in the classification bracket. All rounds were played in a best-of-three format.

First round
8 Nizhny Novgorod	2
5 Spartak Saint Petersburg	0
6 Enisey	2
7 Krasnye Krylia	1

Fifth position
8 Nizhny Novgorod	2
6 Enisey	0
Seventh position
5 Spartak Saint Petersburg	2
7 Krasnye Krylia	1

== Awards ==
=== Regular season MVP ===
- (Poland) Maciej Lampe (UNICS Kazan)

=== Playoffs MVP ===
- (Russia) Victor Khryapa (CSKA Moscow)

=== All-Symbolic Team ===
- First Symbolic Team
  - (United States) Patrick Beverley (Spartak St. Petersburg)
  - (United States) Keith Langford (Khimki Moscow Region)
  - (Bosnia and Herzegovina) Henry Domercant (Spartak St. Petersburg)
  - (Russia) Sergei Monia (Khimki Moscow Region)
  - (Poland) Maciej Lampe (UNICS Kazan)
- Second Symbolic Team
  - (United States) Marcus Williams (Yenisey Krasnoyarsk)
  - (United States) Terrell Lyday (UNICS Kazan)
  - (Lithuania) Ramūnas Šiškauskas (CSKA Moscow)
  - (North Macedonia) Jeremiah Massey (Lokomotiv Kuban)
  - (United States) Lonny Baxter (Yenisey Krasnoyarsk)

== See also ==
- 2010–11 VTB United League
