= 2013–14 Euroleague =

EuroLeague season

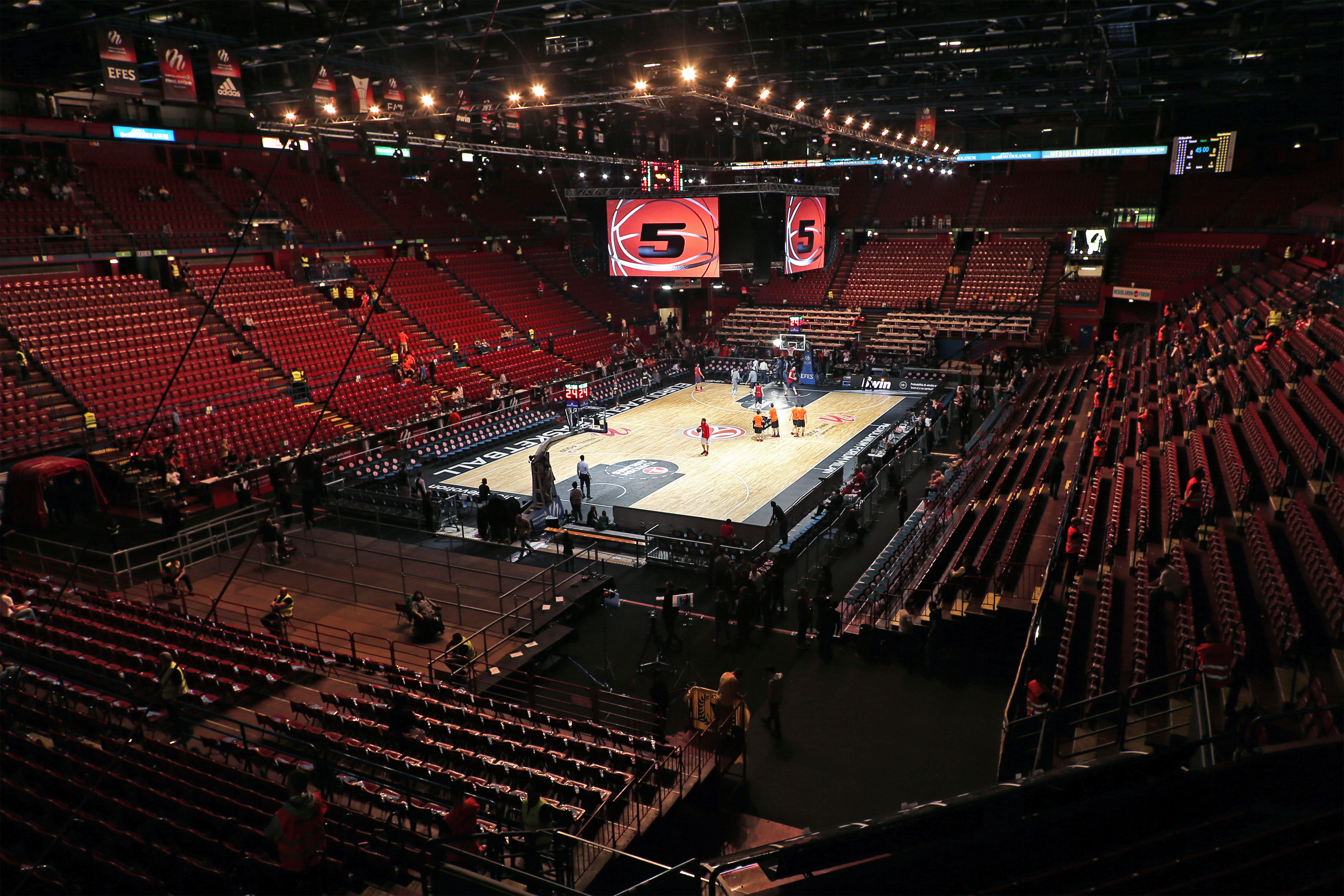
- Scene of the Mediolanum Forum in Milan during the Final Four
- Season: 2013–14
- Duration: 1 October 2013 – 18 May 2014
- Games played: 248
- Teams: 24

Regular season
- Season MVP: (Spain) Sergio Rodríguez

Finals
- Champions: (Israel) Maccabi Electra Tel Aviv (6th title)
- Runners-up: (Spain) Real Madrid
- Third place: (Spain) FC Barcelona
- Fourth place: (Russia) CSKA Moscow
- Final Four MVP: (Montenegro) Tyrese Rice

Awards
- Best Defender: (United States) Bryant Dunston
- Rising Star: (Serbia) Bogdan Bogdanović
- Coach of the Year: (Israel) David Blatt

Statistical leaders
Points	(United States) Keith Langford	17.6
Rebounds	(France) Joffrey Lauvergne	8.6
Assists	(Greece) Dimitris Diamantidis	6.2
Index Rating	(United States) Keith Langford	17.7

Records
- Average attendance: 8,130 ▲
- All statistics correct as of 7 September 2014.

The 2013–14 Turkish Airlines Euroleague was the 14th season of the modern era of Euroleague Basketball and the fourth under the title sponsorship of the Turkish Airlines. Including the competition's previous incarnation as the FIBA Europe Champions Cup, this was the 57th season of the premier competition for European men's clubs.

Euroleague Basketball Company, in its annual meeting in Barcelona, determined the site of the season's Euroleague Final Four venue. London was originally supposed to host the Final Four, but it was decided that the 2014 Euroleague Final Four be held at the Mediolanum Forum, in Milan. In the championship final game, Maccabi Electra Tel Aviv defeated the previous season's runners-up, Real Madrid, by a score of 98–86 after overtime, and won its sixth Euroleague title in the club's history.

== Allocation ==
There were three routes to participation in the Euroleague:

- The 14 teams with an A-Licence from the 2012–13 Euroleague, based on their Euroleague Club Ranking.
- The 2012–13 Eurocup winner was given a C-Licence.
- 14 places were allocated from a list of 30 teams given a B-Licence ranked according to their European national basketball league rankings over the last year. 14 teams were given both an A-Licence or C-Licence and a B-Licence. When a country ranking spot had already been assigned to an A-Licence team, the assignation jumped to the next country appearing in the ranking, and their league was not granted an additional place in the competition. The first 8 of the remaining 16 teams were given places in the regular-season, and the next 6 were given places in the qualifying competition.
- If the Eurocup champion was qualified by receiving a B license, or some team with it resigned from the competition, a wild card had to be given by the Euroleague.

The Euroleague had the right to cancel an A license for one of the following reasons:

- The club had the lowest ranking of all clubs with an A Licence according to the Club Ranking.
- The club had ranked among the clubs placed in the bottom half of the national championship final standings.
- The club had financial problems.
- In the ACB (Spain), when the champion and/or the runner-up of the league were teams without an A license. In that case, the A license club with the lowest position would play Eurocup in the next season. If that happened three times in five years, the A license of the club would be cancelled.

=== Euroleague allocation criteria ===
==== A licenses ====
Classification after the 2012–13 season, including also the 2010–11 and the 2011–12 seasons.

Rank	Team	Points
1.	(Spain) FC Barcelona	144
2.	(Greece) Olympiacos	138
3.	(Greece) Panathinaikos	136
4.	(Spain) Real Madrid	128
5.	(Israel) Maccabi Electra Tel Aviv	128
6.	(Russia) CSKA Moscow	119
7.	(Italy) Montepaschi Siena	118

Rank	Team	Points
8.	(Turkey) Anadolu Efes	98
9.	(Spain) Laboral Kutxa	94
10.	(Spain) Unicaja	87
11.	(Turkey) Fenerbahçe Ülker	87
12.	(Lithuania) Žalgiris	86
13.	(Italy) EA7 Milano	52
14.	(Poland) Asseco Prokom	35

Notes

- EA7 Milano had a two-year A license, awarded in June 2012.
- Asseco Prokom lost its A license, as it was the last qualified in the A licensed team tanking. The license was converted into a wildcard.

==== B licenses ====
B licenses could be given to every team without an A license. If in the allocation appeared a team with an A license, the next team in the criteria would receive the B license, which qualified directly to the Regular Season.

Key to colors
A licensed teams
B licensed teams
WC teams
Teams qualified for the Qualifying Round

	Team	League	Pos.
1.	(Spain) Real Madrid	ACB	1st
2.	(Russia) CSKA Moscow	VTB and PBL	1st
3.	(Italy) Montepaschi Siena	Serie A	1st
4.	(Turkey) Galatasaray	TBL	1st
5.	(Lithuania) Žalgiris	LKL	1st
6.	(Greece) Panathinaikos	GBL	1st
7.	(France) Nanterre	LNB Pro A	1st
8.	(Germany) Brose Bamberg	BBL	1st
9.	(Serbia) Partizan	ABA	1st
10.	(Poland) Stelmet Zielona Góra	PLK	1st
11.	(Serbia) Crvena Zvezda	ABA	2nd
12.	(Spain) FC Barcelona	ACB	2nd
13.	(Russia) Lokomotiv Kuban	VTB and PBL	2nd
14.	(Italy) Acea Roma^{Withdrew}	Serie A	2nd

	Team	League	Pos.
15.	(Turkey) Banvit	TBL	2nd
16.	(Lithuania) Lietuvos Rytas	LKL	2nd
17.	(Greece) Olympiacos	GBL	2nd
18.	(France) Strasbourg^{WC}	LNB Pro A	2nd
19.	(Germany) Oldenburg	BBL	2nd
20.	(Bosnia and Herzegovina) Igokea^{Withdrew}	ABA	3rd
21.	(Belgium) Telenet Oostende	BLB	1st
22.	(Czech Republic) ČEZ Nymburk	NBL	1st
23.	(Ukraine) Budivelnyk^{WC}	UBL	1st
24.	(Israel) Maccabi Haifa^{Withdrew}	BSL	1st
25.	(Bulgaria) Lukoil Academic^{Withdrew}	NBL	1st
26.	(Netherlands) ZZ Leiden^{Withdrew}	DBL	1st
27.	(Latvia) VEF Rīga	LBL	1st
28.	(Poland) Turów Zgorzelec	PLK	2nd

Notes

- Adriatic: the places were awarded to the top teams in the Regular Season. If the third or fourth qualified won the Final Four, it would be granted with the first spot, moving the champion and the runner-up of the Regular Season to the second and third spots. In February 2012, Euroleague Basketball clarified the situation of the Adriatic League spots, saying the three first teams in the Adriatic League Final Four would qualify. Due to the different interpretation of both associations, Euroleague and Liga ABA negotiated a solution to be applied only for the 2012–13 season.

Finally, both organizations agreed that if the team that was in the first position after the Regular Season met all of the B-licence minimum requirements, it would qualify to Euroleague. In that case, Igokea did not meet the required criteria, so Euroleague Basketball applied the 2012–13 Euroleague Bylaws, by which the 2013 ABA Final Four champion and the runner-up, would take the first two Adriatic positions in that order, whilst the next highest regular season team would take the final Adriatic position.

- Russia: the places were awarded to the best teams, by a ranking determined by their positions in the VTB United League, and Russian Professional Basketball League. VTB points prevail in case of tie.

==== C licenses and wild cards ====
To the Regular Season

Vacant C license of Lokomotiv Kuban (2012–13 Eurocup champion), qualified with a B license, Asseco Prokom's lost A license, and the B license rejected by Acea Roma converted to a wild card:

- (France) Strasbourg
- (Ukraine) Budivelnyk
- (Germany) Bayern Munich

To the Qualification Rounds

- (Russia) Khimki
- (Italy) Cimberio Varèse

== Competition format changes ==
As new, for this Euroleague season, the eliminated teams in the Regular Season, were dropped to the Eurocup.

== Teams ==
The labels in the parentheses show how each team qualified for the place of its starting round (TH: Euroleague title holders):

- A: Qualified through an A–licence
- 1st, 2nd, etc.: League position after Playoffs
- QR: Qualifying rounds
- WC: Wild card
- EC: Champion of the 2012–13 Eurocup Basketball

Regular season
(Spain) Real Madrid (A)	(Turkey) Galatasaray (1st)	(Russia) CSKA Moscow (A)	(Serbia) Partizan (1st)
(Spain) FC Barcelona (A)	(Turkey) Anadolu Efes (A)	(Russia) Lokomotiv Kuban (EC)	(Serbia) Crvena zvezda (2nd)
(Spain) Laboral Kutxa (A)	(Turkey) Fenerbahçe (A)	(Germany) Brose Bamberg (1st)	(Israel) Maccabi Electra Tel Aviv (A)
(Spain) Unicaja (A)	(France) Nanterre (1st)	(Germany) Bayern Munich (WC)	(Poland) Stelmet Zielona Góra (1st)
(Greece) Panathinaikos (A)	(France) SIG Strasbourg (WC)	(Italy) Montepaschi Siena (A)	(Ukraine) Budivelnyk (WC)
(Greece) Olympiacos^{TH} (A)	(Lithuania) Žalgiris (A)	(Italy) EA7 Emporio Armani Milano (A)	
Qualifying rounds
(Turkey) Banvit (2nd)	(Lithuania) Lietuvos rytas (2nd)	(Germany) EWE Oldenburg (2nd)	(Belgium) Telenet Oostende (1st)
(Czech Republic) ČEZ Nymburk (1st)	(Latvia) VEF Rīga (1st)	(Russia) Khimki (WC)	(Italy) Cimberio Varese (WC)

== Qualifying rounds ==
The eight teams participated in a single-venue tournament format, from October 1 until October 4, 2013. All games were played in the Siemens Arena in Vilnius, Lithuania.

First round
(Italy) Cimberio Varèse	74
(Germany) EWE Baskets Oldenburg	79
(Lithuania) Lietuvos rytas	80
(Latvia) VEF Rīga	71
(Czech Republic) ČEZ Nymburk	78
(Turkey) Banvit	87
(Russia) Khimki	79
(Belgium) Telenet Oostende	90

Second round
(Germany) EWE Baskets Oldenburg	87
(Lithuania) Lietuvos rytas	99
(Turkey) Banvit	80
(Belgium) Telenet Oostende	82

Third round
(Lithuania) Lietuvos rytas	75
(Belgium) Telenet Oostende	66

== Draw ==
The draws for the 2013–14 Turkish Airlines Euroleague were held on Thursday, 4 July. Teams were seeded into six pots of four teams in accordance with the Club Ranking, based on their performance in European competitions during a three-year period.

Two teams from the same country could not be drawn together in the same Regular Season group.

Pot 1	Pot 2	Pot 3	Pot 4	Pot 5	Pot 6
(Spain) FC Barcelona (Greece) Olympiacos (Greece) Panathinaikos (Spain) Real Madrid	(Israel) Maccabi Electra Tel Aviv (Russia) CSKA Moscow (Italy) Montepaschi Siena (Turkey) Anadolu Efes	(Spain) Laboral Kutxa (Spain) Unicaja (Turkey) Fenerbahçe Ülker (Lithuania) Žalgiris	(Turkey) Galatasaray (Russia) Lokomotiv Kuban (Ukraine) Budivelnyk (Germany) Brose Bamberg	(Italy) EA7 Milano (Serbia) Partizan (Serbia) Crvena Zvezda (Poland) Stelmet Zielona Góra	(Germany) Bayern Munich (France) Nanterre (France) Strasbourg (Lithuania) Lietuvos Rytas (q)

== Regular season ==
Location of teams of the 2013–14 Euroleague group stage.
Red: Group A; Green: Group B; Blue: Group C; Yellow: Group D.

The regular season was played between October 17 and December 20.

If teams were level on record at the end of the Regular Season, tiebreakers were applied in the following order:

1. Head-to-head record.
2. Head-to-head point differential.
3. Point differential during the Regular Season.
4. Points scored during the regular season.
5. Sum of quotients of points scored and points allowed in each Regular Season match.

Key to colors
Top four places in each group advanced to Top 16
Bottom two teams in each group entered 2013–14 Eurocup Basketball Last 32 round

=== Group A ===
Pos	Team	Pld	W	L	PF	PA	PD	Tie
1	(Turkey) Fenerbahçe Ülker	10	8	2	849	749	+100	
2	(Russia) CSKA Moscow	10	7	3	732	676	+56	1–1 (+5)
3	(Spain) FC Barcelona	10	7	3	786	729	+57	1–1 (–5)
4	(Serbia) Partizan	10	3	7	668	715	−47	1–1 (+29)
5	(France) Nanterre	10	3	7	682	753	−71	1–1 (–29)
6	(Ukraine) Budivelnyk	10	2	8	737	832	−95	

=== Group B ===
Pos	Team	Pld	W	L	PF	PA	PD	Tie
1	(Spain) Real Madrid	10	10	0	889	652	+237	
2	(Italy) EA7 Milano	10	5	5	742	762	−20	1–1 (+5)
3	(Lithuania) Žalgiris	10	5	5	743	768	−25	1–1 (–5)
4	(Turkey) Anadolu Efes	10	4	6	741	767	−26	
5	(Germany) Brose Bamberg	10	3	7	756	829	−73	1–1 (+3)
6	(France) Strasbourg	10	3	7	705	798	−93	1–1 (–3)

=== Group C ===
Pos	Team	Pld	W	L	PF	PA	PD	Tie
1	(Greece) Olympiacos	10	10	0	812	734	+78	
2	(Turkey) Galatasaray	10	6	4	700	725	−25	
3	(Spain) Unicaja	10	5	5	756	712	+44	
4	(Germany) Bayern Munich	10	4	6	818	791	+27	
5	(Italy) Montepaschi Siena	10	3	7	674	706	−32	
6	(Poland) Stelmet Zielona Góra	10	2	8	707	799	−92	

=== Group D ===
Pos	Team	Pld	W	L	PF	PA	PD	Tie
1	(Israel) Maccabi Tel Aviv	10	8	2	764	711	+53	
2	(Spain) Laboral Kutxa	10	6	4	767	754	+13	1–1 (+12)
3	(Russia) Lokomotiv Kuban	10	6	4	740	729	+11	1–1 (–12)
4	(Greece) Panathinaikos	10	5	5	768	736	+32	
5	(Serbia) Crvena Zvezda	10	4	6	804	779	+25	
6	(Lithuania) Lietuvos Rytas	10	1	9	686	820	−134	

== Top 16 ==
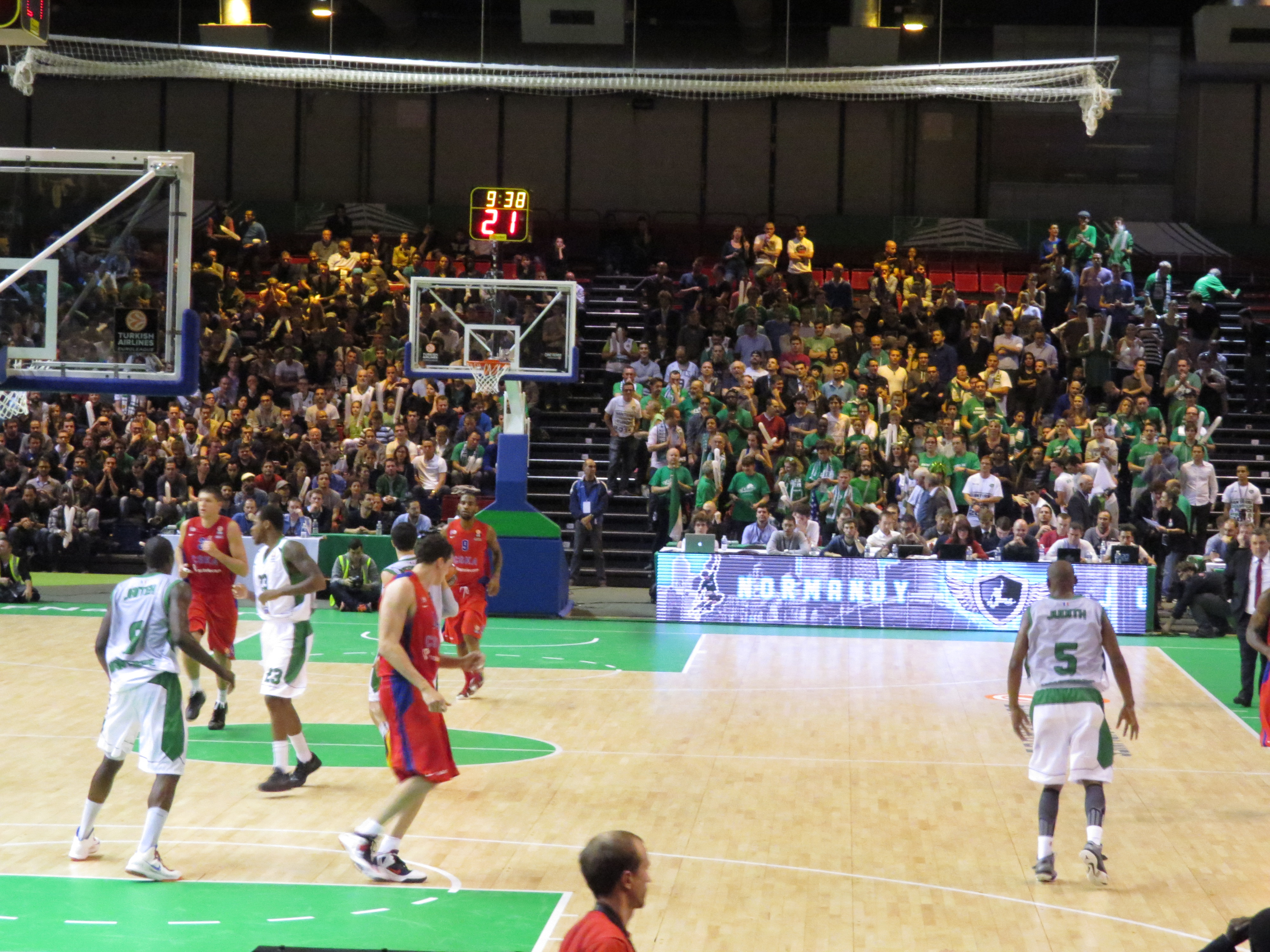
Regular season game between Nanterre and CSKA Moscow

The Top 16 began on January 2 and ended on April 11, 2014.

If teams were level on record at the end of the Top 16, tiebreakers were applied in the following order:

1. Head-to-head record.
2. Head-to-head record between teams still tied.
3. Head-to-head point differential.
4. Point differential during the Top 16.
5. Points scored during the Top 16.
6. Sum of quotients of points scored and points allowed in each Top 16 match.

Key to colors
Top four places in each group advanced to Playoffs
Eliminated

See the detailed group stage page for tiebreakers if two or more teams were equal on points.

=== Group E ===
Pos	Team	Pld	W	L	PF	PA	PD
1	(Spain) FC Barcelona	14	12	2	1109	1009	+100
2	(Italy) EA7 Milano	14	10	4	1093	1011	+82
3	(Greece) Olympiacos	14	8	6	1058	996	+62
4	(Greece) Panathinaikos	14	7	7	961	958	+3
5	(Spain) Unicaja	14	6	8	1032	1063	−31
6	(Turkey) Fenerbahçe Ülker	14	6	8	1078	1101	−23
7	(Spain) Laboral Kutxa	14	5	9	1061	1125	−64
8	(Turkey) Anadolu Efes	14	2	12	967	1096	−129

=== Group F ===
Pos	Team	Pld	W	L	PF	PA	PD
1	(Russia) CSKA Moscow	14	12	2	1167	1035	+132
2	(Spain) Real Madrid	14	11	3	1190	1047	+143
3	(Israel) Maccabi Electra Tel Aviv	14	8	6	1115	1090	+25
4	(Turkey) Galatasaray	14	7	7	1072	1065	+7
5	(Russia) Lokomotiv Kuban	14	7	7	1081	1098	−17
6	(Germany) Bayern Munich	14	5	9	1040	1102	−62
7	(Serbia) Partizan	14	4	10	953	1069	−116
8	(Lithuania) Žalgiris	14	2	12	1062	1174	−112

== Quarterfinals ==
Team 1 hosted Games 1 and 2, plus Game 5 if necessary. Team 2 hosted Game 3, and Game 4 if necessary.

Team 1	Agg.	Team 2	1st leg	2nd leg	3rd leg	4th leg	5th leg
FC Barcelona (Spain)	3–0	(Turkey) Galatasaray	88–61	84–63	78–75		
Real Madrid (Spain)	3–2	(Greece) Olympiacos	88–71	82–77	76–78	62–71	83–69
CSKA Moscow (Russia)	3–2	(Greece) Panathinaikos	77–74	77–51	59–65	72–73	74–44
EA7 Milano (Italy)	1–3	(Israel) Maccabi Electra Tel Aviv	99–101	91–77	63–75	66–86	

== Final Four ==
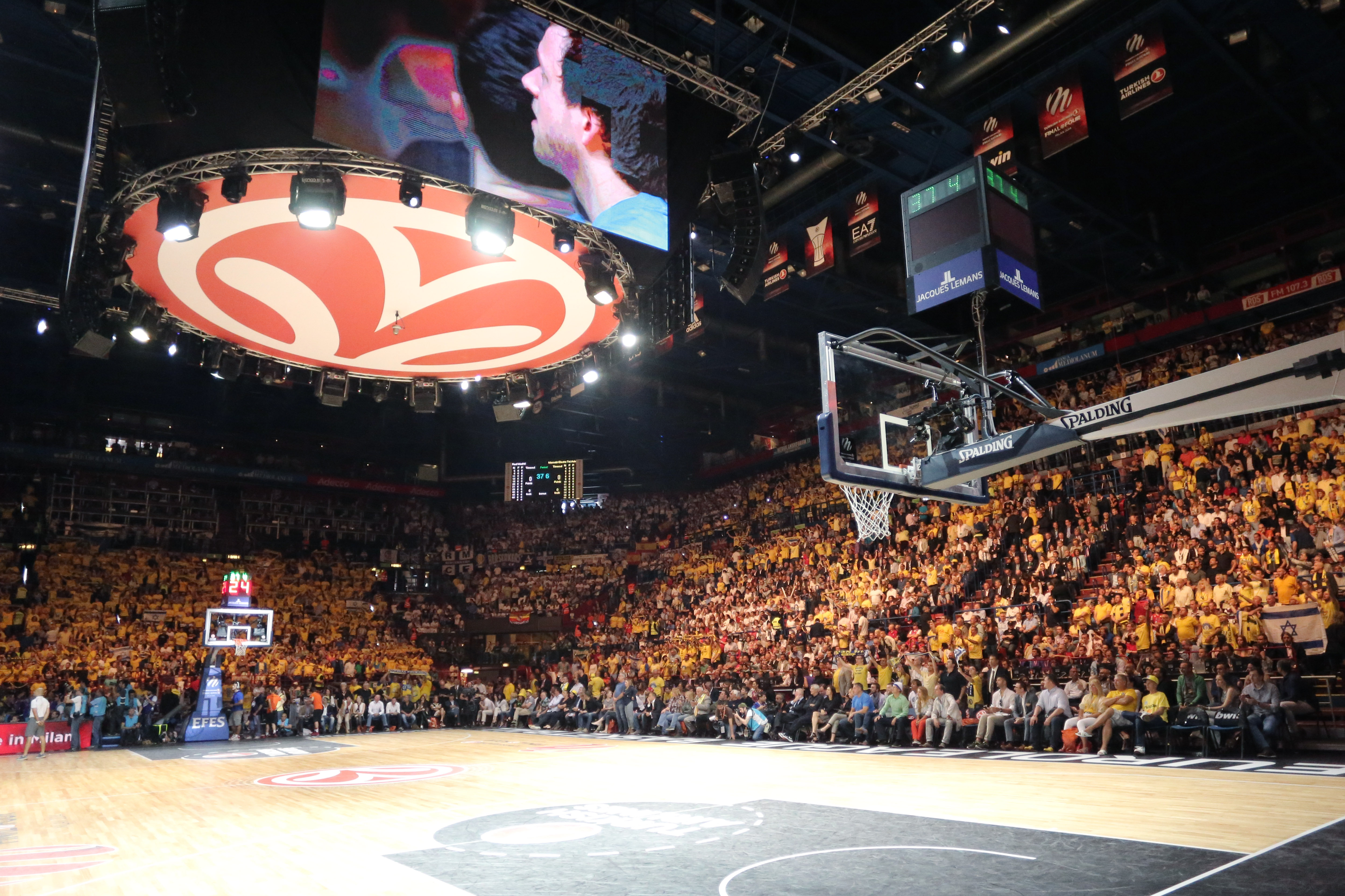
Scene of the championship game at the Mediolanum Forum on 18 May

The Final Four was the last phase of the season and was held over a weekend. The semifinal games were played on 16 May, while the third place game and championship game were played on 18 May. The Final Four was held at the Mediolanum Forum in Milan, Italy.

Semifinals; 16 May
(Russia) CSKA Moscow	67
(Israel) Maccabi Electra Tel Aviv	68
(Spain) FC Barcelona	62
(Spain) Real Madrid	100

Championship game 18 May
(Israel) Maccabi Electra Tel Aviv	98
(Spain) Real Madrid	86
Third place game
(Russia) CSKA Moscow	78
(Spain) FC Barcelona	93

== Attendances ==
=== Top 10 ===
	Round	Game	Home team	Visitor	Attendance	Sources
1	Top 16	1	(Serbia) Partizan	(Spain) Real Madrid	21,374	
2	Regular Season	1	(Serbia) Crvena Zvezda	(Russia) Lokomotiv Kuban	19,000	
3	Top 16	5	(Greece) Panathinaikos	(Spain) FC Barcelona	18,500	
4	Top 16	11	(Greece) Panathinaikos	(Turkey) Fenerbahçe Ülker	17,500	
5	Top 16	7	(Greece) Panathinaikos	(Greece) Olympiacos	17,500	
6	Top 16	3	(Serbia) Partizan	(Russia) CSKA Moscow	16,523	
7	Top 16	5	(Serbia) Partizan	(Russia) Lokomotiv Kuban	15,565	
8	Regular Season	8	(Serbia) Partizan	(Ukraine) Budivelnyk	15,200	
9	Quarter-finals	4	(Greece) Panathinaikos	(Russia) CSKA Moscow	14,750	
10	Regular season	7	(Spain) Laboral Kutxa	(Greece) Panathinaikos	14,196	

=== Average home attendances ===
Pos	Team	GP	Total	High	Low	Average
1	(Serbia) Partizan	12	150,931	21,374	7,500	12,578
2	(Greece) Panathinaikos	14	168,842	18,500	5,192	12,060
3	(Turkey) Fenerbahçe Ülker	12	137,753	12,968	3,230	11,313
4	(Israel) Maccabi Electra Tel Aviv	14	154,580	11,060	10,800	11,041
5	(Spain) Laboral Kutxa	12	128,106	14,196	8,246	10,676
6	(Spain) Real Madrid	15	155,528	13,192	6,899	10,369
7	(Lithuania) Žalgiris	12	118,433	12,000	8,150	9,869
8	(Serbia) Crvena Zvezda	5	48,500	19,000	7,000	9,700
9	(Greece) Olympiacos	13	125,074	11,500	5,500	9,656
10	(Italy) EA7 Milano	14	125,264	12,331	4,630	8,947
11	(Turkey) Galatasaray	13	114,809	11,470	3,829	8,831
12	(Germany) Brose	5	34,000	6,800	6,800	6,800
13	(Spain) Unicaja	12	73,604	10,600	3,512	6,134
14	(Lithuania) Lietuvos Rytas	5	30,350	8,450	3,350	6,070
15	(Germany) Bayern Munich	12	72,445	6,700	5,011	6,037
16	(Russia) Lokomotiv Kuban	12	70,481	7,470	4,274	5,873
17	(Italy) Montepaschi Siena	5	27,549	6,755	4,020	5,510
18	(Spain) FC Barcelona	14	71,620	6,938	3,134	5,116
19	(Russia) CSKA Moscow	15	70,674	5,293	4,201	4,712
20	(Turkey) Anadolu Efes	12	55,311	8,078	2,080	4,609
21	(France) Strasbourg	5	22,715	6,150	3,340	4,543
22	(France) JSF Nanterre	5	21,000	4,500	3,000	4,200
23	(Poland) Stelmet Zielona Góra	5	20,859	4,853	3,251	4,172
24	(Ukraine) Budivelnyk	5	19,800	5,600	1,500	3,960

- Updated to reflect games played through 25 April 2014

Source: Euroleague Basketball

== Individual statistics ==
=== Rating ===
Rank	Name	Team	Games	Rating	PIR
1.	(United States) Keith Langford	(Italy) EA7 Milano	25	442	17.68
2.	(United States) Malcolm Delaney	(Germany) Bayern Munich	24	418	17.42
3.	(Spain) Rudy Fernández	(Spain) Real Madrid	31	534	17.23

=== Points ===
Rank	Name	Team	Games	Points	PPG
1.	(United States) Keith Langford	(Italy) EA7 Milano	25	439	17.56
2.	(United States) Justin Dentmon	(Lithuania) Žalgiris	24	403	16.79
3.	(Greece) Vassilis Spanoulis	(Greece) Olympiacos	26	392	15.08

=== Rebounds ===
Rank	Name	Team	Games	Rebounds	RPG
1.	(France) Joffrey Lauvergne	(Serbia) Partizan	24	207	8.63
2.	(North Macedonia) Richard Hendrix	(Russia) Lokomotiv Kuban	23	167	7.26
3.	(Argentina) Andrés Nocioni	(Spain) Laboral Kutxa	21	138	6.57

=== Assists ===
Rank	Name	Team	Games	Assists	APG
1.	(Greece) Dimitris Diamantidis	(Greece) Panathinaikos	29	180	6.21
2.	(Puerto Rico) Carlos Arroyo	(Turkey) Galatasaray	25	138	5.52
3.	(France) Thomas Heurtel	(Spain) Laboral Kutxa	21	111	5.29

=== Other statistics ===
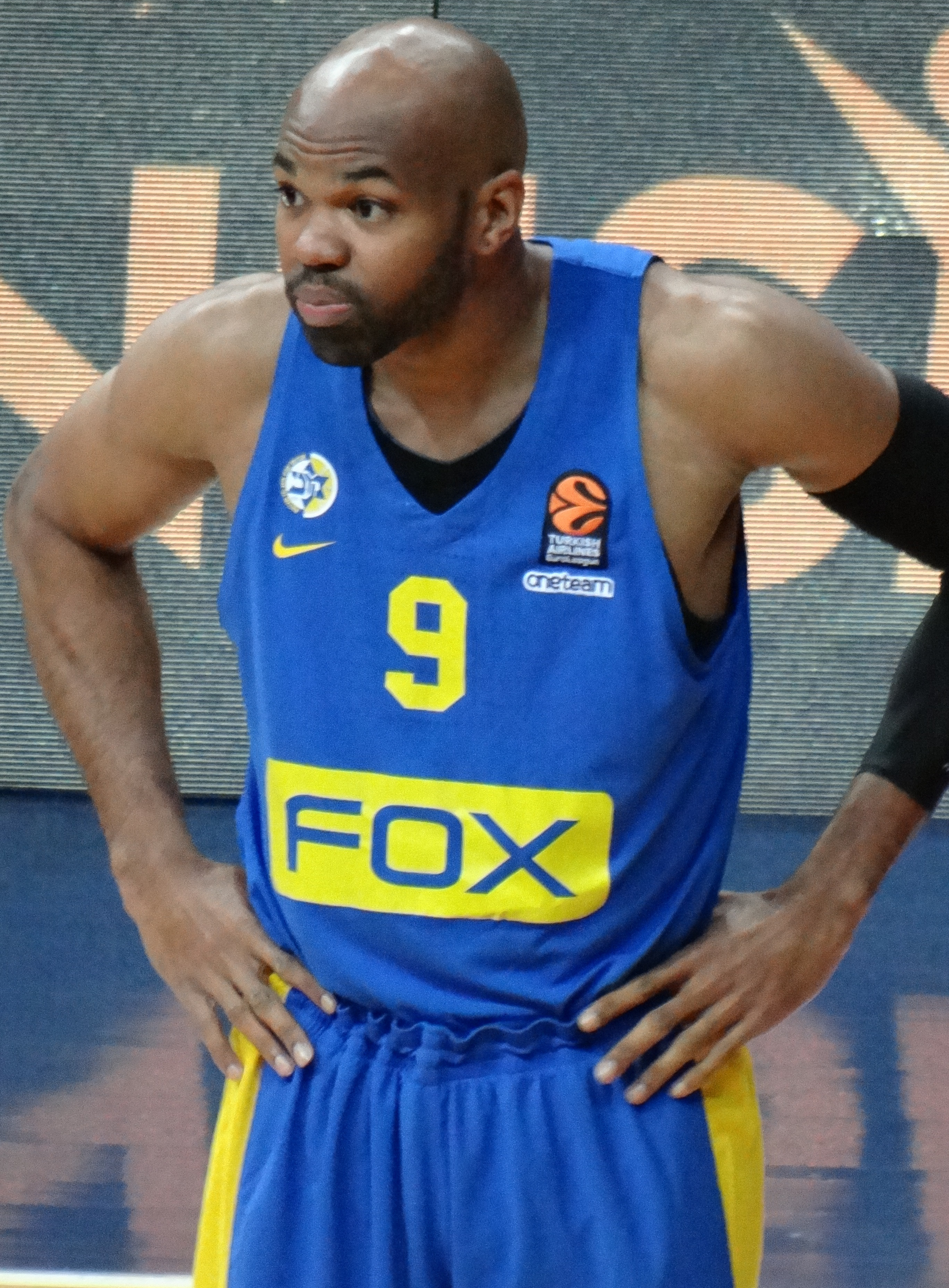
Alex Tyus

Category	Name	Team	Games	Stat
Steals per game	(United States) Jamon Gordon	(Turkey) Anadolu Efes	21	2.00
Blocks per game	(United States) Bryant Dunston	(Greece) Olympiacos	29	1.31
Turnovers per game	(United States) Justin Dentmon	(Lithuania) Žalgiris	24	3.71
Fouls drawn per game	(United States) Keith Langford	(Italy) EA7 Milano	25	6.52
Minutes per game	(France) Joffrey Lauvergne	(Serbia) Partizan	24	32:19
2FG%	(Israel) Alex Tyus	(Israel) Maccabi Electra Tel Aviv	27	0.723
3FG%	(Russia) Valery Likhodey	(Russia) Lokomotiv Kuban	21	0.546
FT%	(Montenegro) Milko Bjelica	(Spain) Laboral Kutxa (Turkey) Anadolu Efes	22	0.931

=== Game highs ===
Category	Name	Team	Stat
Rating	(Lithuania) Darjuš Lavrinovič	(Ukraine) Budivelnyk	44
Points	(Argentina) Andrés Nocioni	(Spain) Laboral Kutxa	37
Rebounds	(United Kingdom) Pops Mensah-Bonsu	(Turkey) Galatasaray	16
Rebounds	(Turkey) Furkan Aldemir	(Turkey) Galatasaray	16
Assists	7 occasions		11
Steals	(United States) Ricky Minard	(Ukraine) Budivelnyk	6
Blocks	3 occasions		6
Turnovers	4 occasions		8
Fouls Drawn	(United States) Keith Langford	(Italy) EA7 Milano	13

== Awards ==
=== 2013–14 Euroleague MVP ===
- (Spain) Sergio Rodríguez ( (Spain) Real Madrid)

=== 2013–14 Euroleague Final Four MVP ===
- (Montenegro) Tyrese Rice ( (Israel) Maccabi Electra Tel Aviv)

=== All-Euroleague Team 2013–14 ===
Pos.	All-Euroleague First Team	Club Team	All-Euroleague Second Team	Club Team
G	(Spain) Sergio Rodríguez	(Spain) Real Madrid	(Georgia (country)) Ricky Hickman	(Israel) Maccabi Electra Tel Aviv
G	(United States) Keith Langford	(Italy) EA7 Milano	(Greece) Vassilis Spanoulis	(Greece) Olympiacos
F	(Spain) Rudy Fernández	(Spain) Real Madrid	(Russia) Victor Khryapa	(Russia) CSKA Moscow
F	(United States) Sonny Weems	(Russia) CSKA Moscow	(Spain) Nikola Mirotić	(Spain) Real Madrid
C	(Croatia) Ante Tomić	(Spain) FC Barcelona	(Gabon) Stéphane Lasme	(Greece) Panathinaikos

=== Top Scorer (Alphonso Ford Trophy) ===
- (United States) Keith Langford ( (Italy) EA7 Milano)

=== Best Defender ===
- (United States) Bryant Dunston ( (Greece) Olympiacos)

=== Rising Star ===
- (Serbia) Bogdan Bogdanović ( (Serbia) Partizan)

=== Coach of the Year (Alexander Gomelsky Award) ===
- (Israel) David Blatt ( (Israel) Maccabi Electra Tel Aviv)

=== MVP Weekly ===
==== Regular season ====
Game	Player	Team	PIR
1	(Spain) Nikola Mirotić	(Spain) Real Madrid	27
2	(Azerbaijan) Nik Caner-Medley	(Spain) Unicaja	29
3	(United States) Bryant Dunston	(Greece) Olympiacos	33
4	(United States) DeMarcus Nelson	(Serbia) Crvena Zvezda	31
5	(United States) Justin Dentmon	(Lithuania) Žalgiris	32
6	(Montenegro) Vladimir Dragičević	(Poland) Stelmet Zielona Góra	32
7	(Slovenia) Boštjan Nachbar	(Spain) FC Barcelona	31
8	(Greece) Vassilis Spanoulis	(Greece) Olympiacos	29
9	(Lithuania) Darjuš Lavrinovič	(Ukraine) Budivelnyk	44
10	(Serbia) Boban Marjanović	(Serbia) Crvena Zvezda	33

==== Top 16 ====
Game	Player	Team	PIR
1	(Greece) Vassilis Spanoulis (2)	(Greece) Olympiacos	39
2	(Brazil) Marcelinho Huertas	(Spain) FC Barcelona	30
3	(Spain) Rudy Fernández	(Spain) Real Madrid	30
4	(Croatia) Krunoslav Simon	(Russia) Lokomotiv Kuban	35
5	(Serbia) Miloš Teodosić	(Russia) CSKA Moscow	31
6	(United States) Justin Dentmon (2)	(Lithuania) Žalgiris	33
7	(Croatia) Ante Tomić	(Spain) FC Barcelona	36
8	(Croatia) Ante Tomić (2)	(Spain) FC Barcelona	40
9	(Slovenia) Zoran Dragić	(Spain) Unicaja	30
10	(United States) Malcolm Delaney	(Germany) Bayern Munich	24
11	(Spain) Rudy Fernández (2)	(Spain) Real Madrid	33
12	(United States) Derrick Brown	(Russia) Lokomotiv Kuban	34
13	(Greece) Dimitris Diamantidis	(Greece) Panathinaikos	31
14	(United States) Justin Dentmon (3)	(Lithuania) Žalgiris	40

==== Quarter-finals ====
Game	Player	Team	PIR
1	(Georgia (country)) Ricky Hickman	(Israel) Maccabi Electra Tel Aviv	36
2	(Greece) Ioannis Bourousis	(Spain) Real Madrid	24
2	(United States) Curtis Jerrells	(Italy) EA7 Milano	24
3	(United States) Bryant Dunston (2)	(Greece) Olympiacos	32
4	(United States) Bryant Dunston (3)	(Greece) Olympiacos	25
5	(Russia) Sasha Kaun	(Russia) CSKA Moscow	29

=== MVP of the Month ===
Month	Player	Team
October 2013	(Spain) Nikola Mirotić	(Spain) Real Madrid
November 2013	(United States) Derrick Brown	(Russia) Lokomotiv Kuban
December 2013	(Greece) Stratos Perperoglou	(Greece) Olympiacos
January 2014	(Serbia) Nenad Krstić	(Russia) CSKA Moscow
February 2014	(Croatia) Ante Tomić	(Spain) FC Barcelona
March 2014	(Croatia) Ante Tomić (2)	(Spain) FC Barcelona
April 2014	(Israel) Alex Tyus	(Israel) Maccabi Electra Tel Aviv

== See also ==
- 2013–14 Eurocup Basketball
- 2013–14 EuroChallenge
