= Alexey Zhukanenko =

Russian basketball player (born 1986)

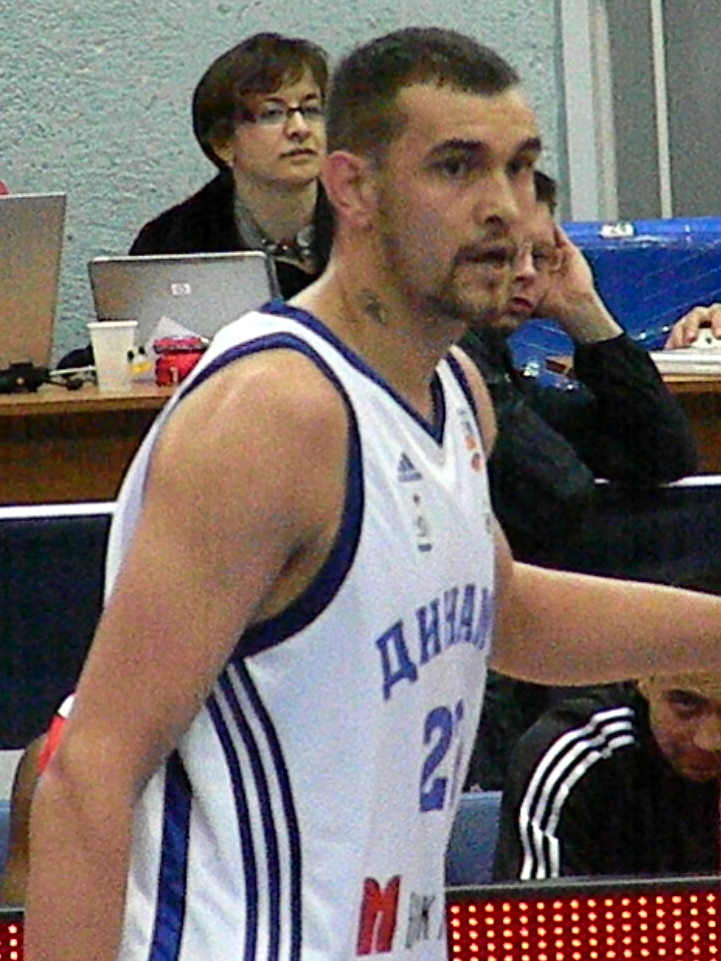

Pieno žvaigždės Pasvalys
- Position: Center
- League: Lithuanian League; Baltic League

Personal information
- Born: May 18, 1986 (age 40) Alma-Ata, Kazakh SSR, Soviet Union
- Listed height: 206 cm (6 ft 9 in)
- Listed weight: 107 kg (236 lb)

Career information
- NBA draft: 2008: undrafted
- Playing career: 2002–present

Career history
- 2002–2005: UNICS Kazan-2
- 2004–2009: UNICS Kazan
- 2009–2011: Dynamo Moscow
- 2011–2013: BC Khimki
- 2013–2015: Lokomotiv Kuban Krasnodar
- 2015–2016: BC Astana
- 2016–2017: BC Samara
- 2017–present: BC Pieno žvaigždės

Career highlights
- Eurocup (2012); PBL All-Star (2011); Russian Cup (2009)

Alexey Yurevich Zhukanenko (Russian: Алексей Юрьевич Жуканенко, born May 18, 1986) is a Kazakhstani-born naturalised-Russian professional basketball player for Pieno žvaigždės of the Lietuvos krepšinio lyga. A center, he has played for a number of Russian clubs in the past, whilst also being an occasional member of the Russian national team.

== Professional career ==
Zhukanenko moved from Almaty (where he played for the youth side of Otrar) to Kazan aged 16 in order to join UNICS Kazan. He played for UNICS Kazan-2, the reserve team, from 2002 to 2005. After one game for the senior side in the 2004–05 FIBA Europe League, he was permanently transferred the next season to play in the Russian Basketball Super League. With UNICS he would reach the 2006–07 ULEB Cup semifinals and win the 2009 Russian Cup.

He moved to Dynamo Moscow in the summer of 2009. During the 2010-11 season he averaged 12.7 points and 7.4 rebounds in the domestic league and 15.4 points and 6.7 rebounds in the EuroChallenge, the third-tier European competition. The same year he participated in the Professional Basketball League's (the Super League's successor) All-Star Game.

In June 2011 he signed a two-year contract with BC Khimki. Zhukanenko averaged 6.1 points and 3.1 rebounds in 12 minutes as Khimki won the 2012 Eurocup.

In June 2013, he transferred to rival (in both the PBL and the newly formed VTB United League) Lokomotiv Kuban, signing a two-year contract.

At the expiry of his contract in July 2015, Zhukanenko returned to his birth country, signing a one-year deal with Kazakhstani VTB United League side BC Astana.

== International career ==
Zhukanenko played for the Russian Under-20 team at the 2006 FIBA Europe Under-20 Championship, posting 4 points and 2.4 rebounds in 7.8 minutes per game as Russia finished 10th.

He participated in the 2009 Universiade, earning a silver medal with Russia.

Zhukanenko was called up the senior Russia squad for the 2010 FIBA World Championship. The center had averages of 6 points and 1.5 rebounds in 11 minutes per game, including personal highs of 12 points and 4 rebounds in the seventh place game win over Slovenia.

He was in the preliminary squads for both EuroBasket 2013 and EuroBasket 2015 but was cut before the main tournaments.

== Personal ==
Alexey is the son of former player Yuri Zhukanenko, who played for the Soviet Union and Kazakhstani powerhouse SKA Alma-Ata. As his father's career (later as a coach) took him to Russia, he followed him there. He has dual Kazakhstani and Russian nationalities, acquiring the second after moving to Kazan.
