= 2021–22 VTB United League =

Russian first tier basketball season

VTB United League
- Season: 2021–22
- Duration: 23 September 2021 – 17 April 2022 (Regular season); 22 April 2022 – 5 June 2022 (Playoffs)
- Teams: 10

Regular season
- Season MVP: (Croatia) Mario Hezonja

Finals
- Champions: (Russia) Zenit Saint Petersburg (1st title)
- Runners-up: (Russia) CSKA Moscow
- Third place: (Russia) UNICS
- Fourth place: (Russia) Lokomotiv Kuban
- Playoffs MVP: (United States) Jordan Mickey

Records
- Biggest home win: Lokomotiv Kuban 109–57 Astana (30 March 2022)
- Biggest away win: Tsmoki Minsk 44–92 CSKA Moscow (23 September 2021); Astana 48–96 CSKA Moscow (10 April 2022)
- Highest scoring: Zenit 110–111 (2OT) CSKA Moscow (27 May 2022)
- Highest attendance: 12,231; CSKA Moscow 75–81 Zenit (5 June 2022)
- Lowest attendance: 290; Avtodor 81–74 Zielona Góra (11 December 2021); Excluding the games played without fans due to the COVID-19 pandemic, including the games played with restricted attendance for the same reason
- All statistics correct as of 5 June 2022.

The 2021–22 VTB United League was the 13th season of the VTB United League. It was the 9th season that the league functions as the Russian domestic first tier level. Two teams left the league mid-season because of the Russian invasion of Ukraine.

== Teams ==
A total of 10 teams from three countries contest the league, including eight sides from Russia, one from Belarus, and one from Kazakhstan.

BC Khimki didn't apply for this season because of the financial difficulties.

On 24 February 2022, Estonian club Kalev/Cramo terminated their membership in the VTB United League in protest against the Russian invasion of Ukraine. The next day the league confirmed receiving declaration letter from the club. On 25 February, Polish club Zielona Góra also suspended their participation in the competition. On 1 March, VTB United League released a statement "Zielona Góra has suspended participation in the League at the moment, the next three home games have been postponed".

=== Venues and locations ===
Locations of teams in the 2021–22 VTB United League

Team	Home city	Arena	Capacity
(Kazakhstan) Astana	Nur-Sultan	Arena Velotrack	9,270
(Russia) Avtodor	Saratov	DS Kristall	5,500
(Russia) CSKA Moscow	Moscow	Megasport Arena	13,344
(Russia) Enisey	Krasnoyarsk	Arena.Sever	4,000
(Estonia) ~~Kalev/Cramo~~	~~Tallinn~~	~~Saku Suurhall~~	~~7,200~~
(Russia) Lokomotiv Kuban	Krasnodar	Basket-Hall	7,500
(Russia) Nizhny Novgorod	Nizhny Novgorod	Trade Union Sport Palace	5,500
(Russia) Parma	Perm	UDS Molot	7,000
(Belarus) Tsmoki Minsk	Minsk	Minsk-Arena	15,000
(Russia) UNICS	Kazan	Basket-Hall	7,000
(Russia) Zenit	Saint Petersburg	Sibur Arena	6,381
(Poland) ~~Zielona Góra~~	~~Zielona Góra~~	~~CRS Hall Zielona Góra~~	~~6,080~~

== Regular season ==
In the regular season, teams play against each other twice (home-and-away) in a round-robin format.

=== Standings ===
Pos	Team	Pld	W	L	PF	PA	PD	PCT	Qualification or relegation
1	(Russia) CSKA Moscow	18	15	3	1596	1260	+336	.833	Advance to playoffs
2	(Russia) Zenit Saint Petersburg	18	14	4	1537	1332	+205	.778	Advance to playoffs
3	(Russia) UNICS	18	14	4	1530	1316	+214	.778	Advance to playoffs
4	(Russia) Lokomotiv Kuban	18	11	7	1663	1566	+97	.611	Advance to playoffs
5	(Russia) Parma	18	10	8	1370	1388	−18	.556	Advance to playoffs
6	(Russia) Avtodor	18	9	9	1475	1559	−84	.500	Advance to playoffs
7	(Russia) Enisey	18	6	12	1381	1474	−93	.333	Advance to playoffs
8	(Russia) Nizhny Novgorod	18	6	12	1353	1418	−65	.333	Advance to playoffs
9	(Belarus) Tsmoki Minsk	18	3	15	1225	1543	−318	.167	
10	(Kazakhstan) Astana	18	2	16	1212	1486	−274	.111	
11	(Poland) Zielona Góra	0	0	0	0	0	0	—	Retired from the league
12	(Estonia) Kalev/Cramo	0	0	0	0	0	0	—	Retired from the league

Source: VTB League

=== Results ===
Home \ Away	AST	AVT	CSK	ENI	KAL	LOK	NIZ	PAR	TSM	UNI	ZEN	ZGA
Astana	—	61–84	48–96	80–87	−	87–83	49–69	65–82	64–65	53–84	60–94	84–70
Avtodor	83–82	—	86–102	79–80	−	95–108	100–94	70–86	95–79	81–76	75–93	81–74
CSKA Moscow	84–65	92–65	—	97–88	104–62	91–71	80–72	98–71	101–54	103–105	79–78	105–71
Enisey	76–65	95–101	62–87	—	−	82–86	87–79	61–78	86–79	80–83	56–79	–
Kalev/Cramo	85–67	93–97	67–56	81–87	—	66–86	−	53–80	−	−	74–75	−
Lokomotiv Kuban	109–57	106–83	69–88	101–93	−	—	97–70	101–74	92–87	101–94	79–106	–
Nizhny Novgorod	76–73	70–83	72–92	61–79	65–71	108–104	—	79–65	72–65	50–65	74–80	–
Parma	108–101	94–73	60–82	61–58	78–74	85–90	71–67	—	91–68	66–73	77–67	83–72
Tsmoki Minsk	66–60	64–72	44–92	72–68	93–91	79–104	53–95	75–78	—	72–92	74–90	–
UNICS	71–59	103–67	69–64	97–77	71–54	96–87	85–71	78–48	98–56	—	80–84	92–63
Zenit Saint Petersburg	69–83	74–83	81–68	89–66	75–60	91–75	90–74	82–75	93–73	97–81	—	97–80
Zielona Góra	91–83	–	59–93	–	−	90–98	77–95	–	96–64	80–85	52–79	—

Source: VTB United League
Legend: Blue = home team win; Red = away team win.

== Playoffs ==
Quarterfinals, semifinals, and bronze medal series were played in a best-of-five format (2-2-1). Finals were played in a best-of-seven format (2-2-1-1-1).

=== Bracket ===
Quarterfinals
1	(Russia) CSKA Moscow	3
8	(Russia) Nizhny Novgorod	0
4	(Russia) Lokomotiv Kuban	3
5	(Russia) Parma	0
2	(Russia) Zenit Saint Petersburg	3
7	(Russia) Enisey	0
3	(Russia) UNICS	3
6	(Russia) Avtodor	0

Semifinals
1	(Russia) CSKA Moscow	3
4	(Russia) Lokomotiv Kuban	1
2	(Russia) Zenit Saint Petersburg	3
3	(Russia) UNICS	1

Finals
1	(Russia) CSKA Moscow	3
2	(Russia) Zenit Saint Petersburg	4
Bronze medal
3	(Russia) UNICS	3
4	(Russia) Lokomotiv Kuban	1

=== Quarterfinals ===
Team 1	Series	Team 2	Game 1	Game 2	Game 3	Game 4	Game 5
CSKA Moscow (Russia)	3–0	(Russia) Nizhny Novgorod	78–64	91–89	88–75	—	—
Zenit Saint Petersburg (Russia)	3–0	(Russia) Enisey	104–55	83–75	82–55	—	—
UNICS (Russia)	3–0	(Russia) Avtodor	106–76	97–59	88–79	—	—
Lokomotiv Kuban (Russia)	3–0	(Russia) Parma	76–70	100–84	101–78	—	—

=== Semifinals ===
Team 1	Series	Team 2	Game 1	Game 2	Game 3	Game 4	Game 5
CSKA Moscow (Russia)	3–1	(Russia) Lokomotiv Kuban	93–90	86–72	82–94	94–84	—
Zenit Saint Petersburg (Russia)	3–1	(Russia) UNICS	65–74	76–67	68–67	75–69	—

=== Bronze medal series ===
Team 1	Series	Team 2	Game 1	Game 2	Game 3	Game 4	Game 5
UNICS (Russia)	3–1	(Russia) Lokomotiv Kuban	90–75	81–94	93–87	94–73	—

=== Finals ===
Team 1	Series	Team 2	Game 1	Game 2	Game 3	Game 4	Game 5	Game 6	Game 7
CSKA Moscow (Russia)	3–4	(Russia) Zenit Saint Petersburg	83–59	82–73	79–93	111–110	95–97	63–82	75–81

^{†} To be played only if necessary.

== VTB League teams in European competitions ==
Team	Competition	Progress
CSKA Moscow	EuroLeague	Regular season (teams were suspended)
UNICS	EuroLeague	Regular season (teams were suspended)
Zenit Saint Petersburg	EuroLeague	Regular season (teams were suspended)
Lokomotiv Kuban	EuroCup	Regular season (teams were suspended)
Nizhny Novgorod	Champions League	Regular season
Kalev/Cramo	Champions League	Regular season
Avtodor	FIBA Europe Cup	Second round
Parma	FIBA Europe Cup	Second round
Tsmoki-Minsk	FIBA Europe Cup	Regular season
Enisey	FIBA Europe Cup	Qualifying rounds

== Awards ==
=== Season awards ===
Award	Player	Team	Ref.
Regular Season MVP	(Croatia) Mario Hezonja	(Russia) UNICS	
Playoffs MVP	(United States) Jordan Mickey	(Russia) Zenit Saint Petersburg	
Scoring Champion	(United States) Errick McCollum	(Russia) Lokomotiv Kuban	
Young Player of the Year	(Russia) Andrey Martyuk	(Russia) Lokomotiv Kuban	
Coach of the Year	(Greece) Dimitrios Itoudis	(Russia) CSKA Moscow	
Performance of the Season	(United States) Anthony Hickey	(Kazakhstan) Astana	
Sixth Man of the Year	(United States) Billy Baron	(Russia) Zenit Saint Petersburg	
Defensive Player of the Year	(United States) Jordan Mickey	(Russia) Zenit Saint Petersburg	
First Team	(United States) Errick McCollum	(Russia) Lokomotiv Kuban	
First Team	(Russia) Alexey Shved	(Russia) CSKA Moscow	
First Team	(Croatia) Mario Hezonja	(Russia) UNICS	
First Team	(United States) Jordan Mickey	(Russia) Zenit Saint Petersburg	
First Team	(Serbia) Nikola Milutinov	(Russia) CSKA Moscow	
Second Team	(United States) Jordan Loyd	(Russia) Zenit Saint Petersburg	
Second Team	(United States) Billy Baron	(Russia) Zenit Saint Petersburg	
Second Team	(United States) Will Clyburn	(Russia) CSKA Moscow	
Second Team	(United States) Johnathan Motley	(Russia) Lokomotiv Kuban	
Second Team	(United States) Alex Poythress	(Russia) Zenit Saint Petersburg	

=== MVP of the Month ===
Month	Player	Team	Ref.
2021
September/October	(Denmark) Gabriel Lundberg	(Russia) CSKA Moscow	
November	(Croatia) Mario Hezonja	(Russia) UNICS	
December	(United States) Kenny Chery	(Russia) Avtodor	
2022
January	(United States) Jeremiah Hill	(Russia) Parma	
February	(United States) Alex Poythress	(Russia) Zenit Saint Petersburg	
March	(Russia) Alexey Shved	(Russia) CSKA Moscow	
April	(United States) Billy Baron	(Russia) Zenit Saint Petersburg	
