= 2014 NBA draft =

Basketball player selection

General information
- Sport: Basketball
- Date: June 26, 2014
- Location: Barclays Center (Brooklyn, New York)
- Network: ESPN

Overview
- 60 total selections in 2 rounds
- League: NBA
- First selection: Andrew Wiggins (Cleveland Cavaliers)

The 2014 NBA draft was held on June 26, 2014, at Barclays Center, Brooklyn. National Basketball Association (NBA) teams took turns selecting amateur U.S. college basketball players and other eligible players, including international players. The draft lottery took place on May 7, 2014. The Cleveland Cavaliers won the draft lottery to earn the first overall pick in the draft; this is the fourth number-one pick for Cleveland since 2003 and third number-one pick over a four-year span from 2011 to 2014. This draft would also be the first for the reborn Charlotte Hornets, who played as the Bobcats from 2004 to 2014, since 2001, when the original Charlotte Hornets last selected as the Charlotte Hornets before moving to New Orleans and eventually becoming the current New Orleans Pelicans.

Television rights in the United States belonged to ESPN. It was tipped by many to be one of the deepest and most hyped draft classes in recent years, with several players touted as future stars. State Farm was the presenting sponsor of the draft. College underclassmen that were highly touted by NBA scouts and executives included: Andrew Wiggins, Jabari Parker, Joel Embiid, Aaron Gordon, Julius Randle, Zach LaVine, T. J. Warren, and Gary Harris. Other highly sought after talents included Australian player Dante Exum and Croatian player Dario Šarić, who both declared for the draft, and Doug McDermott, who was automatically eligible as a graduating college senior.

Highlights from the draft included the first selections made by Adam Silver as commissioner and Mark Tatum as deputy commissioner, the second Canadian to be the first overall pick (Andrew Wiggins), the first pair of Canadian top 10 picks and second pair of Canadian lottery picks (Wiggins and Nik Stauskas), three top 20 Canadian selections (Wiggins, Stauskas, and Tyler Ennis), the first NBA Development League player to be selected in the first round (P. J. Hairston), the first time multiple NBA Development League players were selected in the same draft (Hairston and Thanasis Antetokounmpo), and the first Cape Verdean player to be selected in the draft (Walter Tavares). In addition, a standing ovation for Isaiah Austin occurred between the 15th and 16th picks of the draft, which included having the NBA itself hold a ceremonial pick to select him as a means of letting his dream of having his name be heard in the NBA draft come true, which happened days after he was diagnosed with Marfan syndrome and originally was never considered to play professional basketball again. Nearly two months after the draft ended, Andrew Wiggins was traded to the Minnesota Timberwolves as part of a three-team deal that brought Kevin Love to Cleveland; this resulted in the second time since the NBA–ABA merger that a first overall draft pick would not play a single game for the team that drafted him (the first time being the Orlando Magic drafted Chris Webber first overall in 1993 and then minutes later, traded Webber to the Golden State Warriors for Golden State's third overall pick in the 1993 Draft, Penny Hardaway plus three of Golden State's future first-round draft selections).

Three-time MVP Nikola Jokić was taken with the 41st pick in the second round of the draft, making him the lowest draft selection ever to win the MVP Award and the NBA Finals MVP award.

== Draft selections ==
PG	Point guard	SG	Shooting guard	SF	Small forward	PF	Power forward	C	Center

*	Denotes player who has been selected for at least one All-Star Game and All-NBA Team
^{+}	Denotes player who has been selected for at least one All-Star Game
^{#}	Denotes player who has never appeared in an NBA regular-season or playoff game
^{~}	Denotes player who has been selected as Rookie of the Year

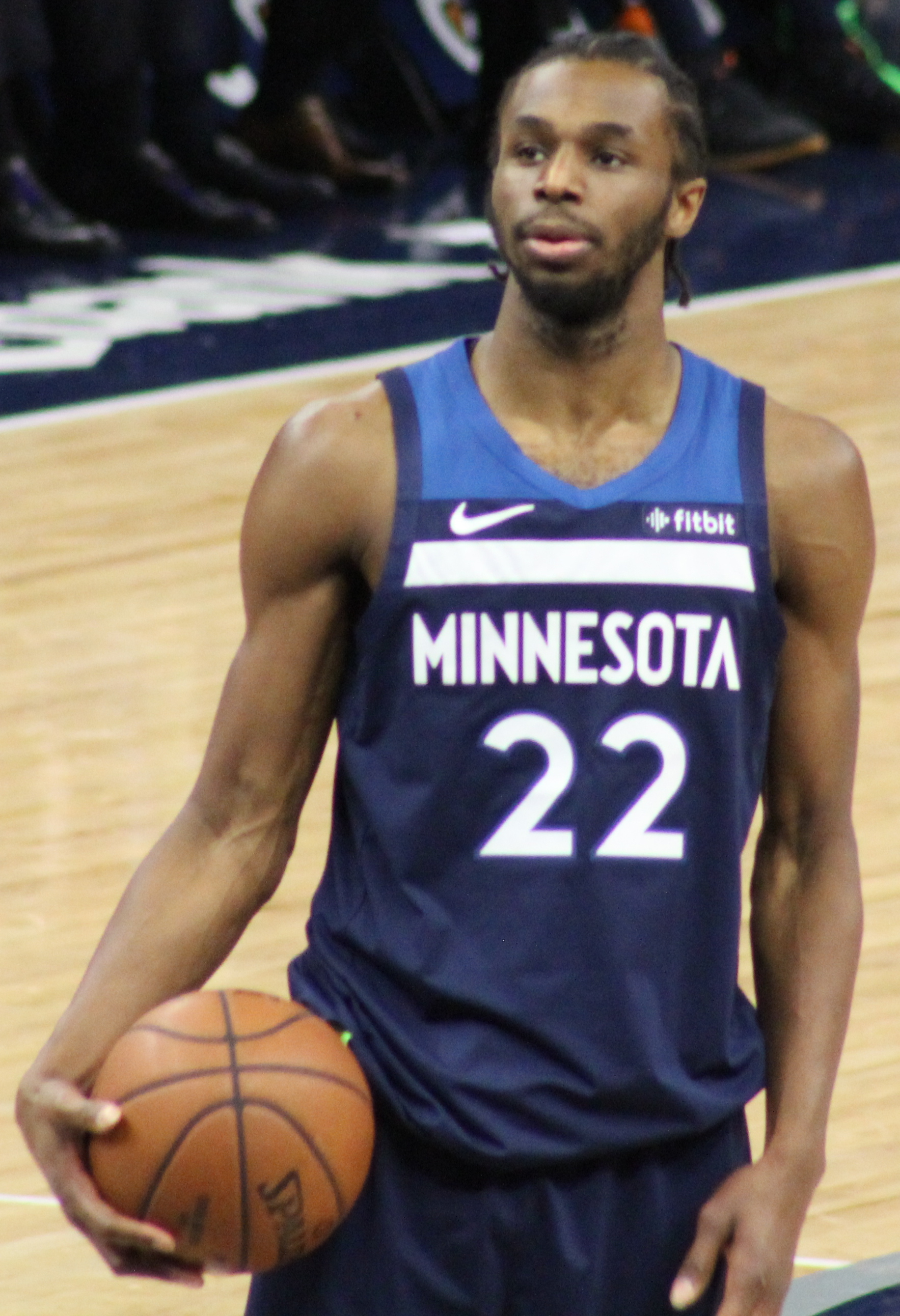
Andrew Wiggins was selected 1st overall by the Cleveland Cavaliers (traded two months later to the Minnesota Timberwolves).

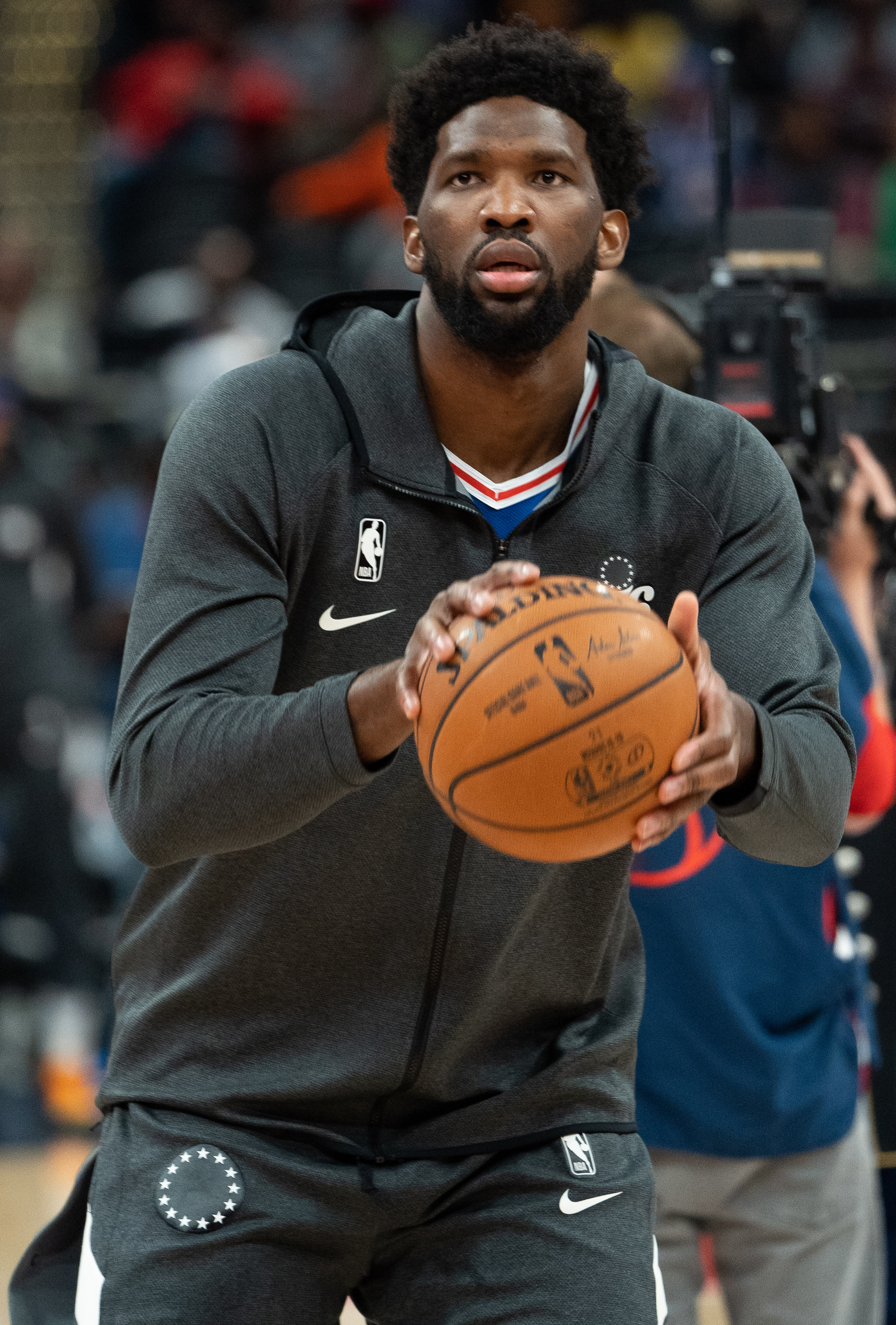
Joel Embiid was selected 3rd overall by the Philadelphia 76ers and was named league MVP in his seventh season.

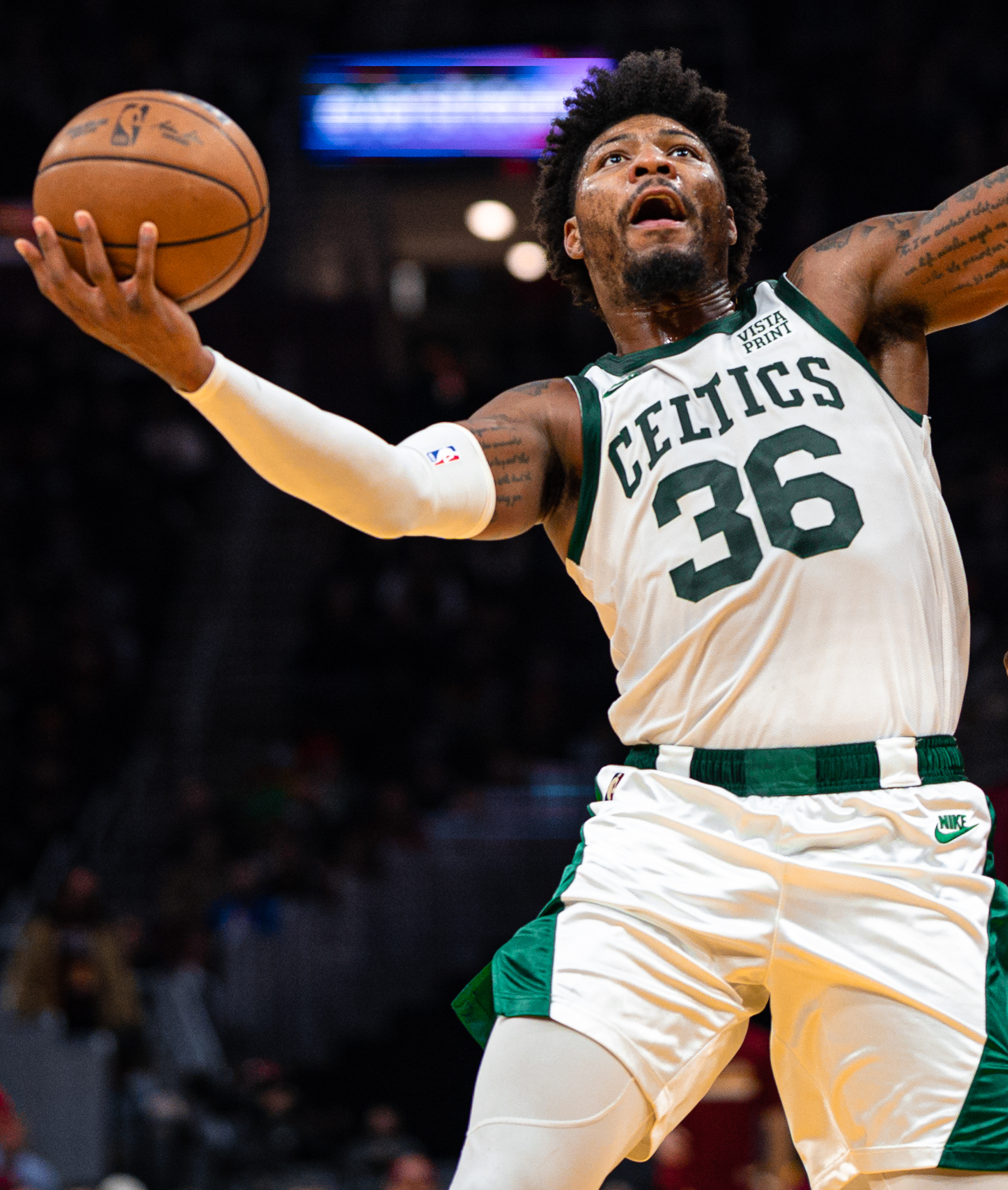
Marcus Smart was selected 6th overall by the Boston Celtics.

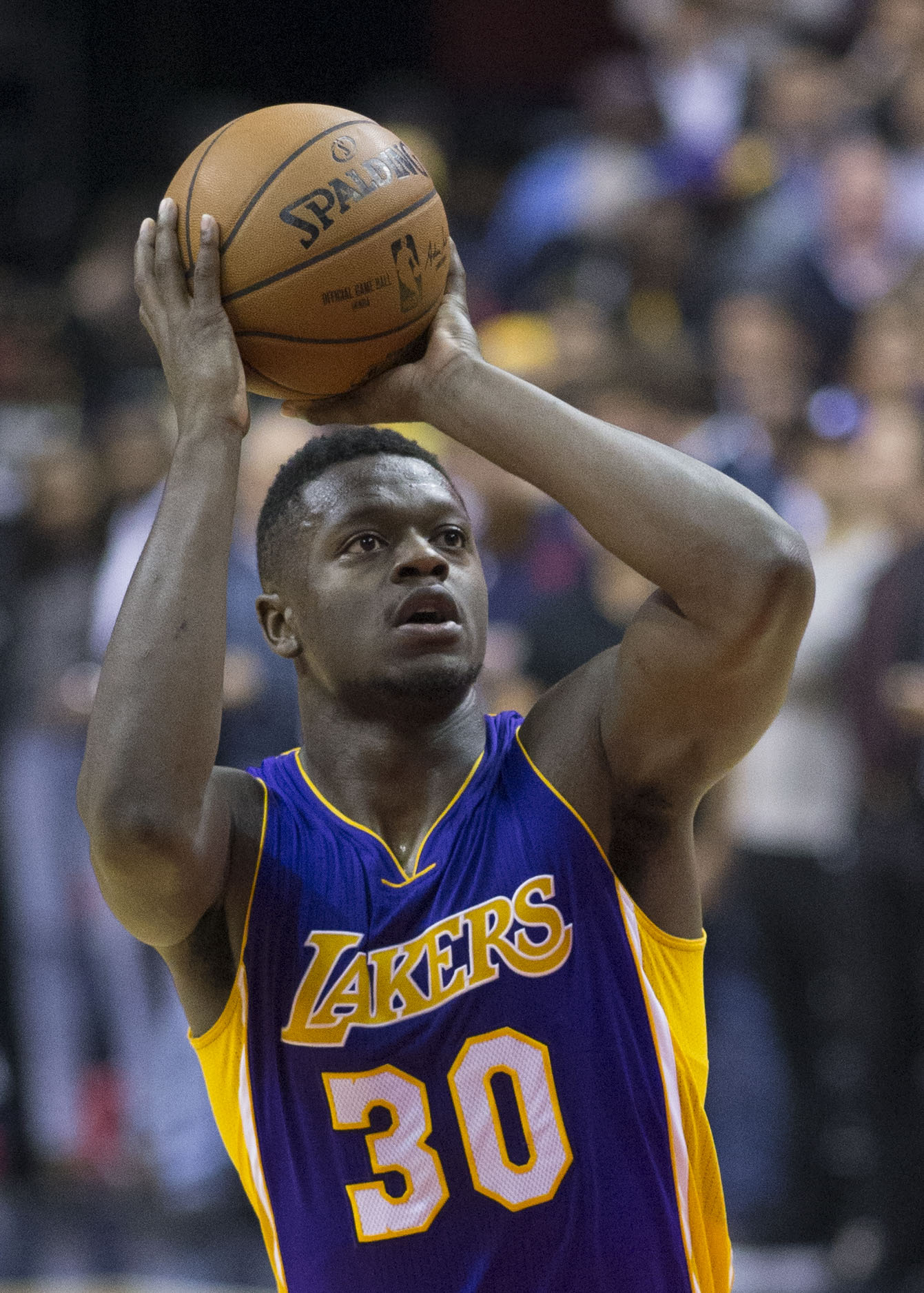
Julius Randle was selected 7th overall by the Los Angeles Lakers.

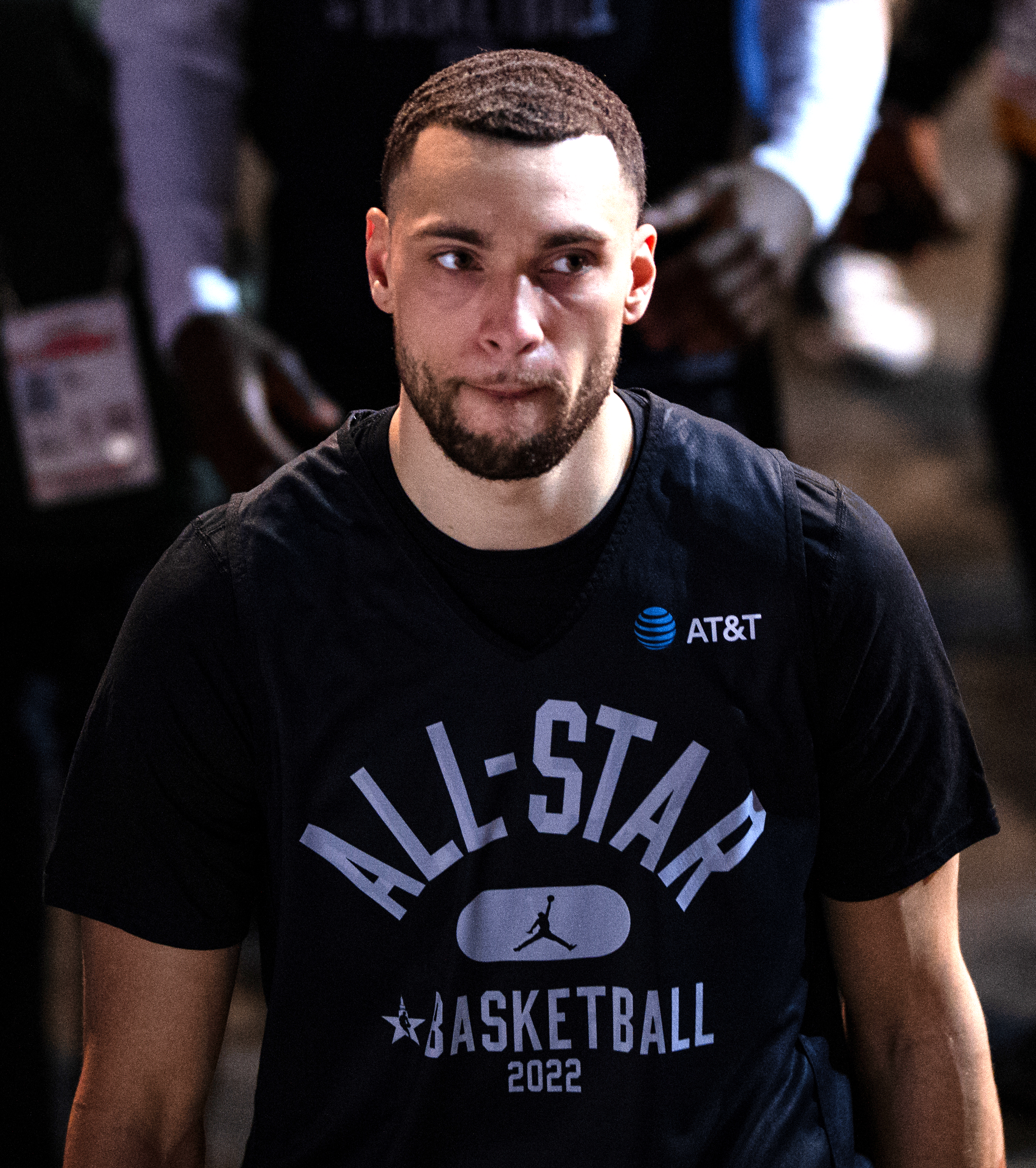
Zach LaVine was selected 13th overall by the Minnesota Timberwolves.

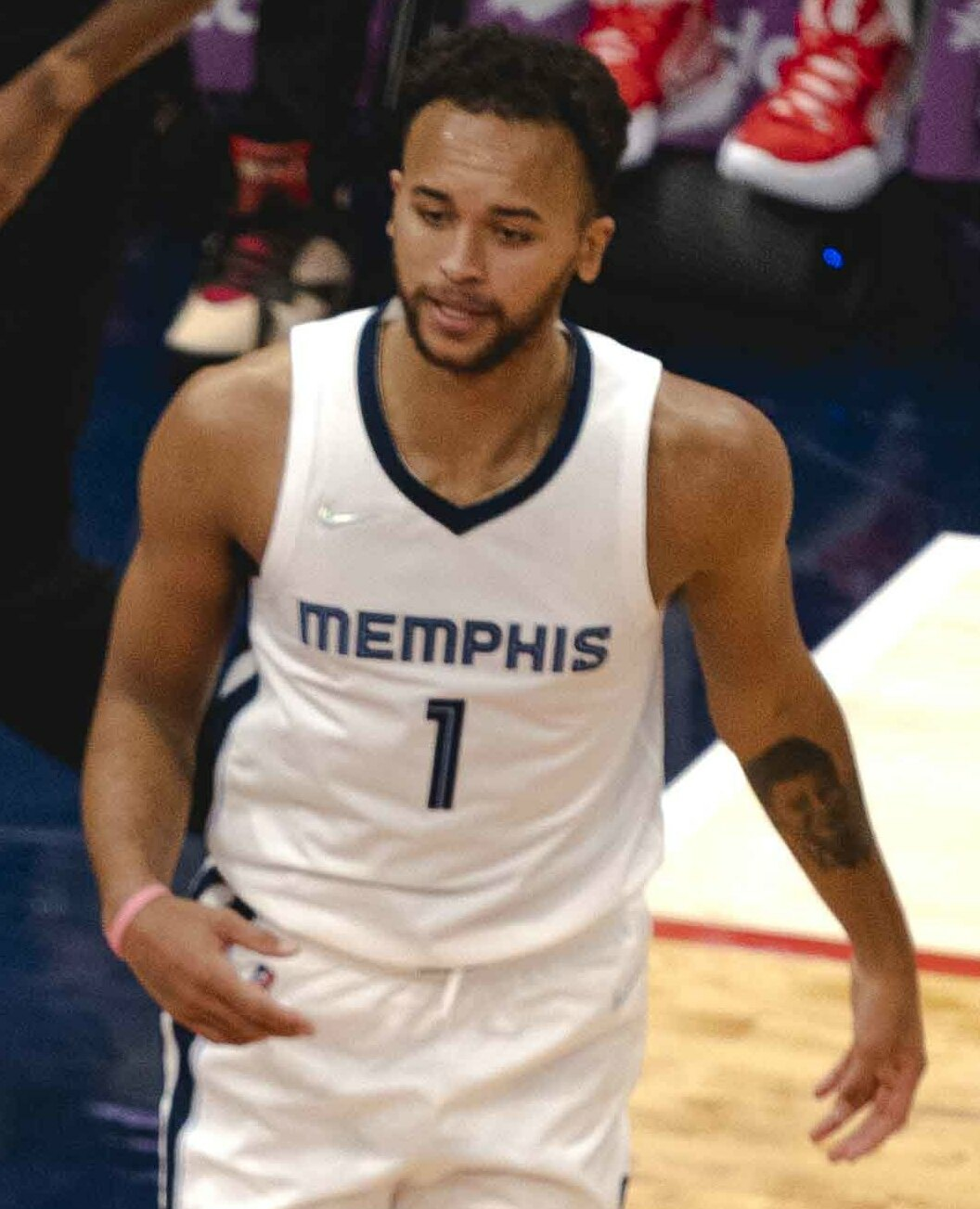
Kyle Anderson was selected 30th overall by the San Antonio Spurs.

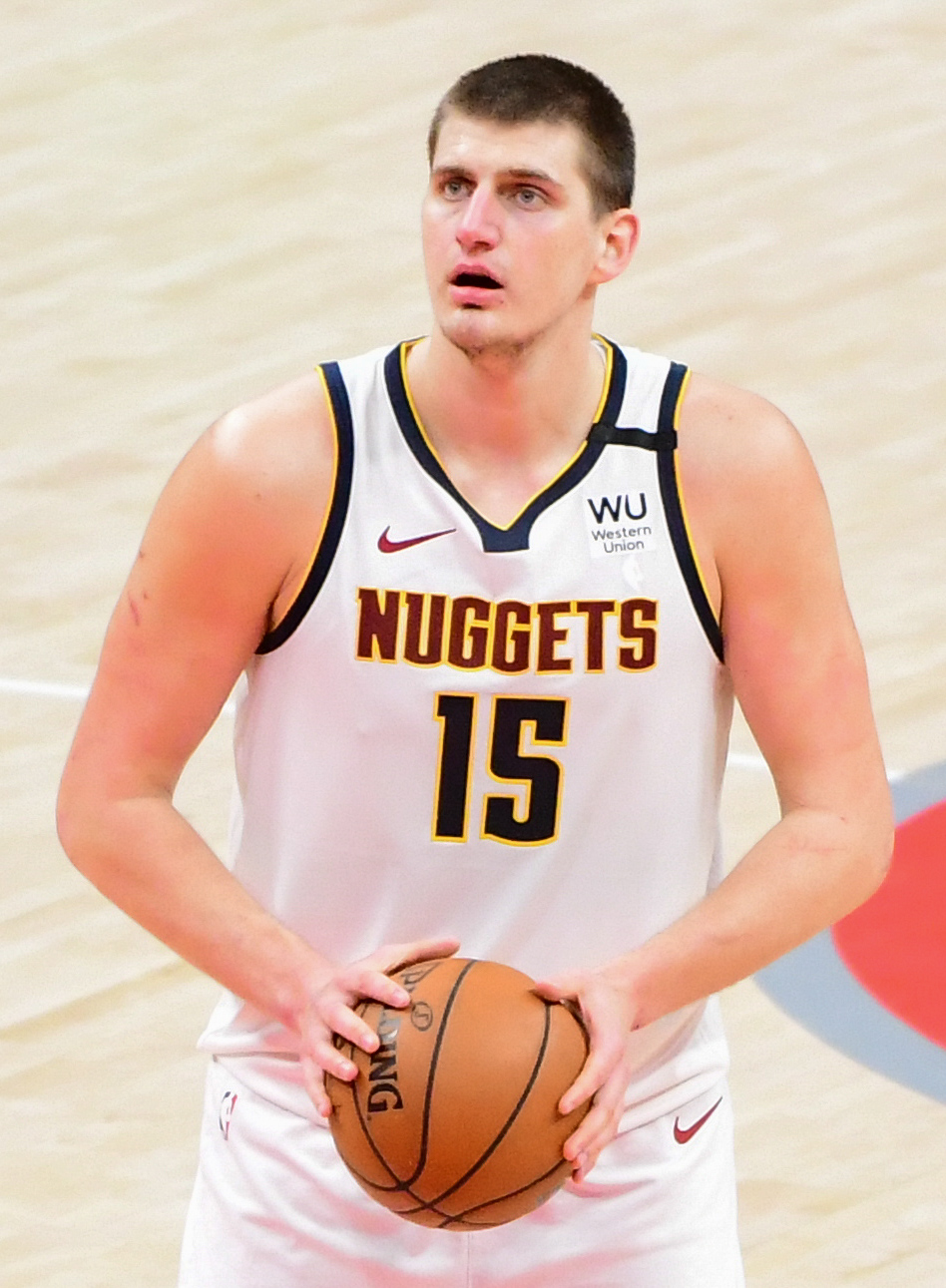
Nikola Jokić was selected 41st overall by the Denver Nuggets and has been named league MVP three times, in his sixth, seventh, and ninth seasons respectively.

Rnd.	Pick	Player	Pos.	Nationality (Note: Nationality indicates the player's national team or representative nationality. If a player has not competed at the international level, then the nationality indicates the national team which the player is eligible to represent according to FIBA rules.)	Team	School / club team
1	1	Andrew Wiggins^{+~}	SF	Canada	Cleveland Cavaliers	Kansas (Fr.)
1	2	Jabari Parker	SF/PF	United States	Milwaukee Bucks	Duke (Fr.)
1	3	Joel Embiid^{*}	C	Cameroon (Note: Embiid was granted French and American citizenship in 2022. Since 2024, he has played for the United States national basketball team.)	Philadelphia 76ers	Kansas (Fr.)
1	4	Aaron Gordon	PF	United States	Orlando Magic	Arizona (Fr.)
1	5	Danté Exum	SG/PG	Australia	Utah Jazz	Australian Institute of Sport (Note: Dante Exum attended the Australian Institute of Sport in conjunction with attending and playing high school basketball for Lake Ginninderra Secondary College until January 2014.)
1	6	Marcus Smart	SG/PG	United States	Boston Celtics	Oklahoma State (So.)
1	7	Julius Randle^{*}	PF	United States	Los Angeles Lakers	Kentucky (Fr.)
1	8	Nik Stauskas	SG	Canada	Sacramento Kings	Michigan (So.)
1	9	Noah Vonleh	PF	United States	Charlotte Hornets (from Detroit) (Note: June 26, 2012: Detroit Pistons to Charlotte Bobcats (now Charlotte Hornets): Charlotte acquired Ben Gordon and a conditional 2013 first-round pick (protected top 14 in 2013, top 8 in 2014); Detroit acquired Corey Maggette)	Indiana (Fr.)
1	10	Elfrid Payton	PG	United States	Philadelphia 76ers (from New Orleans, (Note: July 12, 2013: New Orleans Pelicans to Philadelphia 76ers: Philadelphia acquired draft rights to Nerlens Noel and a conditional 2014 first-round pick (protected top 5 in 2014); New Orleans acquired Jrue Holiday and draft rights to Pierre Jackson) traded to Orlando) (Note: Orlando Magic and Philadelphia 76ers trade: Orlando acquired draft rights to 10th pick Elfrid Payton; Philadelphia 76ers acquired draft rights to 12th pick Dario Šarić, a 2015 second-round pick and a future first-round pick)	Louisiana–Lafayette (Jr.)
1	11	Doug McDermott	SF	United States	Denver Nuggets (traded to Chicago) (Note: Denver Nuggets and Chicago Bulls trade: Chicago acquired Anthony Randolph and draft rights to 11th pick Doug McDermott; Denver acquired draft rights to 16th pick Jusuf Nurkić, draft rights to 19th pick Gary Harris and a 2015 second-round pick)	Creighton (Sr.)
1	12	Dario Šarić	PF	Croatia	Orlando Magic (from New York via Denver, (Note: February 22, 2011: New York Knicks to Denver Nuggets (three-team trade): Denver acquired Wilson Chandler, Raymond Felton, Danilo Gallinari, Timofey Mozgov, a 2014 first-round pick, 2012 and 2013 second-round picks, the option to swap 2016 first-round picks, and cash considerations from New York; Denver acquired Kosta Koufos from Minnesota; New York acquired Carmelo Anthony, Chauncey Billups, Anthony Carter, Renaldo Balkman and Shelden Williams from Denver; New York acquired Corey Brewer from Minnesota; Minnesota acquired a 2015 second-round pick from Denver; Minnesota acquired Anthony Randolph, Eddy Curry and cash considerations from New York; August 10, 2012: Denver Nuggets to Orlando Magic (four-team trade): Orlando acquired Arron Afflalo, Al Harrington, the lesser of Denver's two 2014 first-round picks (Denver's own pick and New York's pick) and a 2013 second-round pick from Denver; Orlando acquired Maurice Harkless, Nikola Vučević and a conditional 2015 first-round pick from Philadelphia; Orlando acquired Josh McRoberts, Christian Eyenga, a conditional 2017 first-round pick and a conditional 2015 second-round pick from L.A. Lakers; Denver acquired Andre Iguodala from Philadelphia; Philadelphia acquired Jason Richardson from Orlando; Philadelphia acquired Andrew Bynum from L.A. Lakers; L.A. Lakers acquired Dwight Howard, Chris Duhon and Earl Clark from Orlando) traded to Philadelphia)	Cibona Zagreb (Croatia) (Note: Dario Šarić played for Cibona Zagreb during the 2013–14 season, but was signed by Anadolu Efes (Turkey) on June 24, 2014.)
1	13	Zach LaVine^{+}	SG	United States	Minnesota Timberwolves	UCLA (Fr.)
1	14	T. J. Warren	SF	United States	Phoenix Suns	North Carolina State (So.)
1	15	Adreian Payne	PF	United States	Atlanta Hawks	Michigan State (Sr.)
1	16	Jusuf Nurkić	C	Bosnia and Herzegovina	Chicago Bulls (from Charlotte, (Note: February 18, 2010: Charlotte Bobcats (now Charlotte Hornets) to Chicago Bulls: Chicago acquired Ronald Murray, Acie Law and a conditional 2012 first-round pick (protected top 14 in 2012, top 12 in 2013, top 10 in 2014); Charlotte acquired Tyrus Thomas) traded to Denver)	Cedevita Zagreb (Croatia)
1	17	James Young	SG/SF	United States	Boston Celtics (from Brooklyn) (Note: July 12, 2013: Brooklyn Nets to Boston Celtics: Boston acquired Gerald Wallace, Kris Humphries, Keith Bogans, MarShon Brooks, Kris Joseph, a 2014 first-round pick, 2016 and 2018 first-round picks, and the option to swap 2017 first-round picks; Brooklyn acquired Paul Pierce, Kevin Garnett, Jason Terry and D. J. White)	Kentucky (Fr.)
1	18	Tyler Ennis	PG	Canada	Phoenix Suns (from Washington) (Note: October 25, 2013: Washington Wizards to Phoenix Suns: Phoenix acquired Emeka Okafor and a conditional 2014 first-round pick (protected top 12 in 2014); Washington acquired Marcin Gortat, Shannon Brown, Kendall Marshall and Malcolm Lee)	Syracuse (Fr.)
1	19	Gary Harris	SG	United States	Chicago Bulls (traded to Denver)	Michigan State (So.)
1	20	Bruno Caboclo	SF	Brazil	Toronto Raptors	EC Pinheiros (Brazil)
1	21	Mitch McGary	PF	United States	Oklahoma City Thunder (from Dallas via L.A. Lakers and Houston) (Note: December 11, 2011: Dallas Mavericks to Los Angeles Lakers: L.A. Lakers acquired a conditional 2012 first-round pick (protected top 20 in 2012–14); Dallas acquired Lamar Odom and a 2012 second-round pick; March 15, 2012: Los Angeles Lakers to Houston Rockets: Houston acquired Derek Fisher and Dallas' conditional 2012 first-round pick (protected top 20 in 2012–14); L.A. Lakers acquired Jordan Hill; October 27, 2012: Houston Rockets to Oklahoma City Thunder: Oklahoma City acquired Kevin Martin, Jeremy Lamb, a 2013 first-round pick, Dallas' conditional 2013 first-round pick (protected top 20 in 2013–14) and a 2013 second-round pick; Houston acquired James Harden, Cole Aldrich, Daequan Cook and Lazar Hayward)	Michigan (So.)
1	22	Jordan Adams	SG	United States	Memphis Grizzlies	UCLA (So.)
1	23	Rodney Hood	SG	United States	Utah Jazz (from Golden State) (Note: July 10, 2013: Golden State Warriors to Utah Jazz (three-team trade): Utah acquired Andris Biedriņš, Richard Jefferson, Brandon Rush, a 2014 first-round pick, a 2017 first-round pick, 2017 and 2018 second-round picks, and cash considerations from Golden State; Utah acquired a 2018 second-round pick from Denver; Golden State acquired Kevin Murphy from Utah; Golden State acquired Andre Iguodala from Denver; Denver acquired Randy Foye from Utah; Denver acquired a 2018 second-round pick from Golden State)	Duke (So.)
1	24	Shabazz Napier	PG	United States (Note: Shabazz Napier was born in the United States to a Puerto Rican mother. He has committed to represent Puerto Rico internationally since 2012, although he is yet to play for Puerto Rico.)	Charlotte Hornets (from Portland, (Note: February 24, 2011: Portland Trail Blazers to Charlotte Bobcats (now Charlotte Hornets): Charlotte acquired Joel Przybilla, Dante Cunningham, Sean Marks, a 2011 first-round pick, a conditional 2013 first-round pick (protected top 12 in 2013–14) and cash considerations; Portland acquired Gerald Wallace) traded to Miami) (Note: Miami Heat and Charlotte Hornets trade: Miami acquired draft rights to 24th pick Shabazz Napier; Charlotte acquired draft rights to 26th pick P. J. Hairston, draft rights to 55th pick Semaj Christon, a 2019 second-round pick and cash considerations)	Connecticut (Sr.)
1	25	Clint Capela	C	Switzerland	Houston Rockets	Élan Chalon (France)
1	26	P. J. Hairston	SG	United States	Miami Heat (traded to Charlotte)	Texas Legends (NBA D-League)
1	27	Bogdan Bogdanović	SG	Serbia	Phoenix Suns (from Indiana) (Note: July 27, 2013: Indiana Pacers to Phoenix Suns: Phoenix acquired Miles Plumlee, Gerald Green and a conditional 2014 first-round pick (protected top 14 in 2014); Indiana acquired Luis Scola)	Partizan Belgrade (Serbia)
1	28	C. J. Wilcox	SG	United States	Los Angeles Clippers	Washington (Sr.)
1	29	Josh Huestis	SF/PF	United States	Oklahoma City Thunder	Stanford (Sr.)
1	30	Kyle Anderson	SF	China; United States (Note: Anderson obtained Chinese citizenship by virtue of descent in 2023 and plays for the China national basketball team.)	San Antonio Spurs	UCLA (So.)
2	31	Damien Inglis	SF	France (Note: Damien Inglis was born in French Guiana, an overseas departments and territories of France that is located on South America. He has represented France internationally at youth level since 2010.)	Milwaukee Bucks	Chorale Roanne (France)
2	32	K. J. McDaniels	SF	United States	Philadelphia 76ers	Clemson (Jr.)
2	33	Joe Harris	SG	United States	Cleveland Cavaliers (from Orlando) (Note: June 23, 2011: Orlando Magic to Cleveland Cavaliers: Cleveland acquired 2013 and 2014 second-round picks; Orlando acquired draft rights to Justin Harper)	Virginia (Sr.)
2	34	Cleanthony Early	SF	United States	New York Knicks (from Boston via Dallas) (Note: June 27, 2013: Boston Celtics to Dallas Mavericks: Dallas acquired draft rights to Lucas Nogueira and two 2014 second-round picks (Boston's and Brooklyn's pick); Boston acquired draft rights to Kelly Olynyk) (Note: June 25, 2014: Dallas Mavericks to New York Knicks: New York acquired José Calderón, Wayne Ellington, Shane Larkin, Samuel Dalembert, the 34th and the 51st pick in the 2014 draft; Dallas acquired Tyson Chandler and Raymond Felton)	Wichita State (Sr.)
2	35	Jarnell Stokes	PF	United States	Utah Jazz (traded to Memphis) (Note: Memphis Grizzlies and Utah Jazz trade: Memphis acquired draft rights to 35th pick Jarnell Stokes; Utah acquired a 2016 second-round pick)	Tennessee (Jr.)
2	36	Johnny O'Bryant III	PF	United States	Milwaukee Bucks (from L.A. Lakers via Phoenix and Minnesota) (Note: July 11, 2012: Los Angeles Lakers to Phoenix Suns: Phoenix acquired 2013 and 2015 first-round picks, 2013 and 2014 second-round picks, and cash considerations; L.A. Lakers acquired Steve Nash; July 27, 2012: Phoenix Suns to Minnesota Timberwolves (three-team trade): Minnesota acquired Lakers' 2014 second-round pick from Phoenix; Minnesota acquired 2013 and 2016 second-round picks from New Orleans; Phoenix acquired Wesley Johnson and a conditional 2014 first-round pick (protected top 13 in 2014) from Minnesota; Phoenix acquired Jerome Dyson and Brad Miller from New Orleans; New Orleans acquired Robin Lopez, Hakim Warrick and cash considerations from Phoenix; July 11, 2013: Minnesota Timberwolves to Milwaukee Bucks (three-team trade): Milwaukee acquired Luke Ridnour and Lakers' 2014 second-round pick from Minnesota; Milwaukee acquired cash considerations from Oklahoma City; Minnesota acquired Kevin Martin and cash considerations from Oklahoma City; Oklahoma City acquired from draft rights to Szymon Szewczyk from Milwaukee)	Louisiana State (Jr.)
2	37	DeAndre Daniels^{#}	SF	United States	Toronto Raptors (from Sacramento) (Note: July 16, 2012: Sacramento Kings to Toronto Raptors: Toronto acquired a 2014 second-round pick; Sacramento acquired James Johnson)	Connecticut (Jr.)
2	38	Spencer Dinwiddie	PG/SG	United States	Detroit Pistons	Colorado (Jr.)
2	39	Jerami Grant	SF	United States	Philadelphia 76ers (from Cleveland) (Note: February 20, 2014: Cleveland Cavaliers to Philadelphia 76ers: Philadelphia acquired Earl Clark, Henry Sims and two 2014 second-round picks (Cleveland's and Memphis' pick); Cleveland acquired Spencer Hawes)	Syracuse (So.)
2	40	Glenn Robinson III	SF	United States	Minnesota Timberwolves (from New Orleans) (Note: September 9, 2009: New Orleans Hornets (now New Orleans Pelicans) to Minnesota Timberwolves: Minnesota acquired Antonio Daniels and a 2014 second-round pick; New Orleans acquired Bobby Brown and Darius Songaila)	Michigan (So.)
2	41	Nikola Jokić^{*}	C	Serbia	Denver Nuggets	Mega Vizura (Serbia)
2	42	Nick Johnson	PG/SG	United States	Houston Rockets (from New York) (Note: July 11, 2012: New York Knicks to Houston Rockets: Houston acquired Toney Douglas, Josh Harrellson, Jerome Jordan, a 2014 second-round pick, a 2015 second-round pick and cash considerations; New York acquired Marcus Camby)	Arizona (Jr.)
2	43	Walter Tavares	C	Cape Verde	Atlanta Hawks	CB Gran Canaria (Spain)
2	44	Markel Brown	SG	United States	Minnesota Timberwolves (Note: July 12, 2010: Minnesota Timberwolves to Miami Heat: Miami acquired 2011 and 2014 second-round picks; Minnesota acquired Michael Beasley; June 24, 2011: Miami Heat to Minnesota Timberwolves: Minnesota acquired draft rights to Bojan Bogdanović, cash considerations and also re-acquired their 2014 second-round pick; Miami acquired draft rights to Norris Cole) (traded to Brooklyn) (Note: Brooklyn Nets and Minnesota Timberwolves trade: Brooklyn acquired draft rights to 44th pick Markel Brown; Minnesota acquired cash considerations)	Oklahoma State (Sr.)
2	45	Dwight Powell	PF	Canada	Charlotte Hornets	Stanford (Sr.)
2	46	Jordan Clarkson	PG	United States (Note: Clarkson obtained Filipino citizenship by naturalization and has played for the Philippines national basketball team since 2018.)	Washington Wizards (traded to L.A. Lakers) (Note: Los Angeles Lakers and Washington Wizards trade: L.A. Lakers acquired draft rights to 46th pick Jordan Clarkson; Washington acquired cash considerations)	Missouri (Jr.)
2	47	Russ Smith	PG/SG	United States	Philadelphia 76ers (from Brooklyn via Boston and Dallas, (Note: June 23, 2011: New Jersey Nets (now Brooklyn Nets) to Boston Celtics: Boston acquired draft rights to JaJuan Johnson and a 2014 second-round pick; New Jersey acquired draft rights to MarShon Brooks) (Note: June 27, 2013: Dallas Mavericks to Philadelphia 76ers: Philadelphia acquired Brooklyn's 2014 second-round pick; Dallas acquired draft rights to Ricky Ledo) traded to New Orleans) (Note: New Orleans Pelicans and Philadelphia 76ers trade: New Orleans acquired draft rights to 47th pick Russ Smith; Philadelphia acquired draft rights to Pierre Jackson)	Louisville (Sr.)
2	48	Lamar Patterson	SG/SF	United States	Milwaukee Bucks (from Toronto via Phoenix, (Note: February 21, 2013: Toronto Raptors to Phoenix Suns: Phoenix acquired Hamed Haddadi and a conditional 2014 second-round pick; Toronto acquired Sebastian Telfair; July 10, 2013: Phoenix Suns to Milwaukee Bucks (three-team trade): Milwaukee acquired Toronto's conditional 2014 second-round pick from Phoenix; Milwaukee acquired a conditional 2015 second-round pick from the L.A. Clippers; Phoenix acquired Eric Bledsoe and Caron Butler from L.A. Clippers; L.A. Clippers acquired JJ Redick from Milwaukee; L.A. Clippers acquired Jared Dudley from Phoenix) traded to Atlanta) (Note: Atlanta Hawks and Milwaukee Bucks trade: Atlanta acquired draft rights to 48th pick Lamar Patterson; Milwaukee acquired a 2015 second-round pick)	Pittsburgh (Sr.)
2	49	Cameron Bairstow	PF/C	Australia	Chicago Bulls	New Mexico (Sr.)
2	50	Alec Brown^{#}	C	United States	Phoenix Suns	Green Bay (Sr.)
2	51	Thanasis Antetokounmpo	SF	Greece (Note: Antetokounmpo was born in Greece to Nigerian parents. He holds dual citizenship and plays for the Greece national basketball team.)	New York Knicks (from Dallas)	Delaware 87ers (NBA D-League)
2	52	Vasilije Micić	PG	Serbia	Philadelphia 76ers (from Memphis via Cleveland) (Note: July 25, 2012: Memphis Grizzlies to Cleveland Cavaliers: Cleveland acquired Jeremy Pargo, a 2014 second-round pick and cash considerations; Memphis acquired D. J. Kennedy)	Mega Vizura (Serbia)
2	53	Alessandro Gentile^{#}	SF	Italy	Minnesota Timberwolves (from Golden State, (Note: June 27, 2013: Golden State Warriors to Minnesota Timberwolves: Minnesota acquired a 2014 second-round pick and cash considerations; Golden State acquired Malcolm Lee and draft rights to André Roberson) traded to Houston) (Note: Houston Rockets and Minnesota Timberwolves trade: Houston acquired draft rights to 53rd pick Alessandro Gentile; Minnesota acquired cash considerations)	Olimpia Milano (Italy)
2	54	Nemanja Dangubić^{#}	SG	Serbia	Philadelphia 76ers (from Houston via Milwaukee, (Note: June 27, 2012: Houston Rockets to Milwaukee Bucks: Milwaukee acquired Samuel Dalembert, 2012 and 2014 second-round picks; Houston acquired Jon Brockman, Jon Leuer, Shaun Livingston and the 12th pick in the 2012 NBA draft; June 27, 2013: Milwaukee Bucks to Philadelphia 76ers: Philadelphia acquired draft rights to Ricky Ledo and Houston's 2014 second-round pick; Milwaukee acquired draft rights to Nate Wolters) traded to San Antonio) (Note: San Antonio Spurs and Philadelphia 76ers trade: San Antonio acquired draft rights to 54th pick Nemanja Dangubić; Philadelphia acquired draft rights to 58th pick Jordan McRae and draft rights to 60th pick Cory Jefferson)	Mega Vizura (Serbia)
2	55	Semaj Christon	PG	United States	Miami Heat (traded to Oklahoma City via Charlotte) (Note: Oklahoma City Thunder and Charlotte Hornets trade: Oklahoma City acquired draft rights to 55th pick Semaj Christon; Charlotte acquired cash considerations)	Xavier (So.)
2	56	Devyn Marble	SG/SF	United States	Denver Nuggets (from Portland, (Note: June 23, 2011: Portland Trail Blazers to Denver Nuggets (three-team trade): Denver acquired Andre Miller and a 2014 second-round pick from Portland; Denver acquired draft rights to Jordan Hamilton from Dallas; Portland acquired Raymond Felton from Denver; Portland acquired draft rights to Tanguy Ngombo from Dallas; Dallas acquired Rudy Fernández and draft rights to Petteri Koponen from Portland) traded to Orlando) (Note: Orlando Magic and Denver Nuggets trade: Orlando acquired Evan Fournier and draft rights to 56th pick Roy Devyn Marble; Denver acquired Arron Afflalo)	Iowa (Sr.)
2	57	Louis Labeyrie^{#}	PF/C	France	Indiana Pacers (traded to New York) (Note: New York Knicks and Indiana Pacers trade: New York acquired draft rights to 57th pick Louis Labeyrie; Indiana acquired cash considerations)	Paris-Levallois Basket (France)
2	58	Jordan McRae	SG	United States	San Antonio Spurs (from L.A. Clippers via New Orleans, (Note: January 26, 2010: Los Angeles Clippers to New Orleans Hornets (now New Orleans Pelicans): New Orleans acquired a 2014 second-round pick and cash considerations; L.A. Clippers acquired Bobby Brown; October 18, 2010: New Orleans Hornets (now New Orleans Pelicans) to San Antonio Spurs: San Antonio acquired L.A. Clippers' 2014 second-round pick; New Orleans acquired Curtis Jerrells) traded to Philadelphia)	Tennessee (Sr.)
2	59	Xavier Thames^{#}	PG/SG	United States	Toronto Raptors (from Oklahoma City via New York, (Note: February 21, 2013: Oklahoma City Thunder to New York Knicks: New York acquired a 2014 second-round pick and cash considerations; Oklahoma City acquired Ronnie Brewer; July 10, 2013: New York Knicks to Toronto Raptors: Toronto acquired Marcus Camby, Steve Novak, Quentin Richardson, a 2016 first-round pick, Oklahoma City's 2014 second-round pick and 2017 second-round pick; New York acquired Andrea Bargnani) traded to Brooklyn) (Note: Brooklyn Nets and Toronto Raptors trade: Brooklyn acquired draft rights to 59th pick Xavier Thames; Toronto acquired cash considerations)	San Diego State (Sr.)
2	60	Cory Jefferson	PF	United States	San Antonio Spurs (traded to Brooklyn via Philadelphia) (Note: Brooklyn Nets and Philadelphia 76ers trade: Brooklyn acquired draft rights to 60th pick Cory Jefferson; Philadelphia acquired cash considerations)	Baylor (Sr.)

== Notable undrafted players ==
These eligible players were not selected in the 2014 NBA draft but have played at least one game in the NBA. In April 2015, the undrafted Sim Bhullar became the first player of Indian descent to play in the league.

Player	Position	Nationality	School/club team
Keith Appling	PG	United States	Michigan State (Sr.)
Jerrelle Benimon	PF	United States	Towson (Sr.)
Sim Bhullar	C	Canada	New Mexico State (So.)
Khem Birch	PF/C	Canada	UNLV (Sr.)
Tarik Black	PF	United States	Kansas (Sr.)
Jabari Brown	SG	United States	Missouri (Jr.)
Coty Clarke	SF	United States	Arkansas (Sr.)
Bryce Cotton	PG	United States (Note: Cotton became an Australian citizen in 2025.)	Providence (Sr.)
Torrey Craig	SG/SF	United States	USC Upstate (Sr.)
Mitch Creek	SG/SF	Australia	Adelaide 36ers (Australia)
Andre Dawkins	SG	United States	Duke (Sr.)
Jarell Eddie	SF	United States	Virginia Tech (Sr.)
Cristiano Felício	PF/C	Brazil	Flamengo (Brazil)
Tim Frazier	PG/SG	United States	Penn State (Sr.)
Langston Galloway	PG	United States	Saint Joseph's (Sr.)
Tyler Johnson	SG	United States	Fresno State (Sr.)
Sean Kilpatrick	SG	United States	Cincinnati (Sr.)
Alex Kirk	C	United States	New Mexico (Sr.)
Maxi Kleber	PF	Germany	s.Oliver Baskets (Germany)
Walter Lemon Jr.	PG	United States	Bradley (Sr.)
James Michael McAdoo	PF	United States	North Carolina (Jr.)
Eric Moreland	PF	United States	Oregon State (Sr.)
Xavier Munford	PG	United States	Rhode Island (Sr.)
Norvel Pelle	PF	Antigua and Barbuda (Note: Pelle was born in Antigua and Barbuda and raised in the United States; he also holds Lebanese citizenship by naturalization. Since 2017, he plays for the Lebanon national basketball team.)	Delaware 87ers (NBA D-League)
JaKarr Sampson	SF	United States	St. John's (So.)
David Stockton	PG	United States	Gonzaga (Sr.)
Axel Toupane	SG/SF	France	Strasbourg IG (France)
David Wear	PF	United States	UCLA (Sr.)
Travis Wear	SF	United States	UCLA (Sr.)
Okaro White	SF/PF	United States	Florida State (Sr.)
Shayne Whittington	PF/C	United States	Western Michigan (Sr.)
Jamil Wilson	SF	United States	Marquette (Sr.)

== Eligibility and entrants ==
The draft is conducted under the eligibility rules established in the league's new 2011 collective bargaining agreement (CBA) with its players union. The CBA that ended the 2011 lockout instituted no immediate changes to the draft, but called for a committee of owners and players to discuss future changes. As of 2014, the basic eligibility rules for the draft are listed below.

- All drafted players must be at least 19 years old during the calendar year of the draft. In terms of dates, players eligible for the 2014 draft must be born on or before December 31, 1995.
- Any player who is not an "international player", as defined in the CBA, must be at least one year removed from the graduation of his high school class. The CBA defines "international players" as players who permanently resided outside the United States for three years prior to the draft, did not complete high school in the U.S., and have never enrolled at a U.S. college or university.

=== Early entrants ===
Player who are not automatically eligible must declare their eligibility for the draft by notifying the NBA offices in writing no later than 60 days before the draft. For the 2014 draft, this date fell on April 27. After this date, "early entry" players may attend NBA pre-draft camps and individual team workouts to show off their skills and obtain feedback regarding their draft positions. Under the CBA, a player may withdraw his name from consideration from the draft at any time before the final declaration date, which is 10 days before the draft. Under then-current NCAA rules, players only had until April 16 to withdraw from the draft and maintain their college eligibility. (Note: Effective in 2016, the NCAA changed its withdrawal date to 10 days after the end of the annual NBA Draft Combine held in mid-May.)

A player who has hired an agent will forfeit his remaining college eligibility, regardless of whether he is drafted. Also, while the CBA allows a player to withdraw from the draft twice, the NCAA then mandated that a player who declared twice lost his college eligibility. (Note: Also in 2016, the NCAA changed its draft declaration rules to allow players to declare for and withdraw from more than one draft without losing college eligibility, as long as they make a timely withdrawal without signing a professional contract outside the NBA or hiring an agent.)

This year, a total of 45 collegiate players and 30 international players declared as early entry candidates. On June 16, the withdrawal deadline, 18 early entry candidates withdrew from the draft, leaving 44 collegiate players and 13 international players as the early entry candidates for the draft.

College underclassmen
Player	School	Class
Jordan Adams	UCLA	Sophomore
William Alston	CC of Baltimore County (Note: William Alston last played for Community College of Baltimore County in 2011)	Freshman
Kyle Anderson	UCLA	Sophomore
Isaiah Austin (Note: About a week before the draft, Isaiah Austin was diagnosed with Marfan syndrome, a genetic disorder that affects connective tissue. Because the condition frequently has serious and life-threatening effects on the heart and circulatory system, Austin was advised to end his playing career.)	Baylor	Sophomore
Chane Behanan	Colorado State (Note: Although Chane Behanan is listed as being from Colorado State, he never played for that school. He was dismissed from Louisville during the holiday break between the fall 2013 and spring 2014 academic terms. After leaving Louisville, Behanan enrolled in classes at Colorado State with hopes of playing there in 2014–15, but instead chose to enter the draft.)	Junior
Sim Bhullar	New Mexico State	Sophomore
Khem Birch	UNLV	Junior
Jabari Brown	Missouri	Junior
Jahii Carson	Arizona State	Sophomore
Semaj Christon	Xavier	Sophomore
Jordan Clarkson	Missouri	Junior
DeAndre Daniels	Connecticut	Junior
Spencer Dinwiddie	Colorado	Junior
Joel Embiid	Kansas	Freshman
Tyler Ennis	Syracuse	Freshman
Aaron Gordon	Arizona	Freshman
Jerami Grant	Syracuse	Sophomore
Gary Harris	Michigan State	Sophomore
Rodney Hood	Duke	Sophomore
Nick Johnson	Arizona	Junior
Alex Kirk	New Mexico	Junior
Zach LaVine	UCLA	Freshman
James Michael McAdoo	North Carolina	Junior
K. J. McDaniels	Clemson	Junior
Mitch McGary	Michigan	Sophomore
Eric Moreland	Oregon State	Junior
Johnny O'Bryant III	LSU	Junior
Jabari Parker	Duke	Freshman
Elfrid Payton	Louisiana–Lafayette	Junior
Julius Randle	Kentucky	Freshman
Glenn Robinson III	Michigan	Sophomore
LaQuinton Ross	Ohio State	Junior
Antonio Rucker	Clinton JC	Freshman
JaKarr Sampson	St. John's	Sophomore
Marcus Smart	Oklahoma State	Sophomore
Roscoe Smith	UNLV	Junior
Nik Stauskas	Michigan	Sophomore
Jarnell Stokes	Tennessee	Junior
Noah Vonleh	Indiana	Freshman
T. J. Warren	North Carolina State	Sophomore
Andrew Wiggins	Kansas	Freshman
James Young	Kentucky	Freshman
Ta'Quan Zimmerman	Thompson Rivers (Canada)	Junior

International players
Player	Nationality	Club team
Bruno Caboclo	Brazil	EC Pinheiros (Brazil)
Clint Capela	Switzerland	Élan Chalon (France)
Nemanja Dangubić	Serbia	Mega Vizura (Serbia)
Dante Exum	Australia	Australian Institute of Sport
Damien Inglis	France	Chorale Roanne (France)
Nikola Jokić	Serbia	Mega Vizura (Serbia)
Michalis Kamperidis	Greece	Filathlitikos (Greece)
Artem Klimenko	Russia	Avtodor Saratov (Russia)
Lucas Mariano	Brazil	Franca BC (Brazil)
Vasilije Micić	Serbia	Mega Vizura (Serbia)
Jusuf Nurkić	Bosnia and Herzegovina	Cedevita Zagreb (Croatia)
Dario Šarić	Croatia	Cibona Zagreb (Croatia)
Ojārs Siliņš	Latvia	Reggio Emilia (Italy)

Other players
Player	Nationality	Club team
P. J. Hairston (Note: P. J. Hairston played collegiately for North Carolina but was suspended for the 2013–14 season and later left college basketball to play professionally. Although he met the criteria for automatic eligibility for the draft, the NBA still considered him as an early-entrant college underclassman and allowed him to withdraw from the draft.)	United States	Texas Legends (NBA D-League)

=== Automatically eligible entrants ===
Players who do not meet the criteria for "international" players are automatically eligible if they meet any of the following criteria:

- They have completed 4 years of their college eligibility.
- If they graduated from high school in the U.S., but did not enroll in a U.S. college or university, four years have passed since their high school class graduated.
- They have signed a contract with a professional basketball team outside of the NBA, anywhere in the world, and have played under that contract.

Players who meet the criteria for "international" players are automatically eligible if they meet any of the following criteria:

- They are least 22 years old during the calendar year of the draft. In terms of dates, players born on or before December 31, 1992, are automatically eligible for the 2014 draft.
- They have signed a contract with a professional basketball team outside of the NBA within the United States, and have played under that contract.

Before the draft, the NBA released a list of D-League players who are automatically eligible for the draft.

Automatically eligible D-League players
Player	Team
Thanasis Antetokounmpo	Delaware 87ers
Aquille Carr	Delaware 87ers
Cleveland Melvin	Erie BayHawks
Norvel Pelle	Delaware 87ers
Elijah Pittman	Delaware 87ers

== Combine ==
The invitation-only NBA Draft Combine occurred in Chicago from May 14 to 18. 60 players were invited. The 2014 D-League Elite Mini Camp, which included 37 players, occurred in Chicago in the two days preceding the combine.

== Draft lottery ==
The first 14 picks in the draft belong to teams that had missed the playoffs; the order was determined through a lottery. The lottery determined the three teams that would obtain the first three picks on the draft. The remaining first-round picks and the second-round picks were assigned to teams in reverse order of their win–loss record in the previous season. As it is commonplace in the event of identical win–loss records, the NBA performed a random drawing to break the ties on April 18, 2014.

The lottery was held on May 20, 2014, at the Times Square Studios in New York City. The Cleveland Cavaliers, who had the ninth-worst record, won the lottery with just a 1.7% chance to win the first pick. It was the second year in a row the Cavaliers won the lottery, as well as their third time in four years. It also tied the Chicago Bulls ascension in the 2008 NBA draft for the second largest upset ever and the largest upset in the current lottery system that started in 1994. The Milwaukee Bucks, who had the worst record and the highest chance to win the lottery at 25%, obtained the second pick. The lottery completed with the Philadelphia 76ers, who had the second-worst record, obtaining the third pick.

Below were the chances for each team to get specific picks in the draft lottery, rounded to three decimal places:

^	Denotes the actual lottery result

Team	2013–14 record	Lottery chances	Lottery probabilities													
Team	2013–14 record	Lottery chances	1st	2nd	3rd	4th	5th	6th	7th	8th	9th	10th	11th	12th	13th	14th
Milwaukee Bucks	15–67	250	.250	.215^	.177	.358	—	—	—	—	—	—	—	—	—	—
Philadelphia 76ers	19–63	199	.199	.188	.171^	.319	.124	—	—	—	—	—	—	—	—	—
Orlando Magic	23–59	156	.156	.157	.156	.225^	.265	.041	—	—	—	—	—	—	—	—
Utah Jazz	25–57	104	.104	.112	.121	.099	.373^	.177	.014	—	—	—	—	—	—	—
Boston Celtics	25–57	103	.103	.111	.120	—	.238	.342^	.082	.004	—	—	—	—	—	—
Los Angeles Lakers	27–55	63	.063	.071	.081	—	—	.440	.304^	.040	.001	—	—	—	—	—
Sacramento Kings	28–54	43	.043	.049	.058	—	—	—	.600	.232^	.018	.000	—	—	—	—
Detroit Pistons	29–53	28	.028	.033	.039	—	—	—	—	.725	.168^	.008	.000	—	—	—
Cleveland Cavaliers	33–49	17	.017^	.020	.024	—	—	—	—	—	.813	.122	.004	.000	—	—
New Orleans Pelicans	34–48	11	.011	.013	.016	—	—	—	—	—	—	.870^	.089	.002	.000	—
Denver Nuggets	36–46	8	.008	.009	.012	—	—	—	—	—	—	—	.907^	.063	.001	.000
New York Knicks	37–45	7	.007	.008	.010	—	—	—	—	—	—	—	—	.935^	.039	.000
Minnesota Timberwolves	40–42	6	.006	.007	.009	—	—	—	—	—	—	—	—	—	.960^	.018
Phoenix Suns	48–34	5	.005	.006	.007	—	—	—	—	—	—	—	—	—	—	.982^

1: The Charlotte Hornets acquired Detroit Pistons' pick because it fell outside the top eight.
2: The Philadelphia 76ers acquired New Orleans Pelicans' pick because it fell outside the top five.
3: The Orlando Magic acquired the lesser of Denver Nuggets' pick and New York Knicks' pick.

== Draft ceremony ==
In the first round of the draft, each team has five minutes to decide which player they would like to select. During the five minutes, the team can also propose a trade with another team before making their final selection. The NBA commissioner then announce the selection and the player, wearing a basketball cap sporting the team's logo, comes up to the stage to be congratulated and presented to the audience. In the second round, each team has two minutes to make their picks while the deputy commissioner assumes the commissioner's role.

The NBA annually invites around 10–15 players to sit in the so-called "green room", a special room set aside at the draft site for the invited players to sit with their families and agents. When their names are called, the player leaves the room and goes up on stage. Other players who are not invited, are allowed to attend the ceremony, sit in the stands with the fans and walk up on stage when they're drafted. This year, however, the league decided to invite 21 players to the green room. The 20 players who were invited and attended the draft are Tyler Ennis, Dante Exum, Aaron Gordon, Gary Harris, Rodney Hood, Zach LaVine, Doug McDermott, Shabazz Napier, Jusuf Nurkić, Jabari Parker, Adreian Payne, Elfrid Payton, Julius Randle, Dario Šarić, Marcus Smart, Nik Stauskas, Noah Vonleh, T. J. Warren, Andrew Wiggins and James Young. Joel Embiid was invited, but he was unable to attend the draft due to an injury sustained before the draft and its subsequent surgery that prevented him from traveling to New York. Out of the 21 players invited, 19 players were selected in the top 19. The other two, Hood and Napier, were selected 23rd and 24th respectively.

In addition to the above, former Baylor player Isaiah Austin, who had declared for the draft but was forced to end his playing career after being diagnosed with Marfan syndrome during a physical for the draft, was invited to attend as a special guest from the newly implemented league commissioner, Adam Silver. During the draft, he was ceremonially drafted by the league between the 15th and the 16th picks and came up to the stage sporting a generic NBA cap.

== Trades involving draft picks ==
=== Pre-draft trades ===
Prior to the day of the draft, the following trades were made and resulted in exchanges of draft picks between the teams.

=== Draft-day trades ===
The following trades involving drafted players were made on the day of the draft.

== See also ==
- List of first overall NBA draft picks
