= Artem Klimenko =

Ukrainian-born Russian basketball player

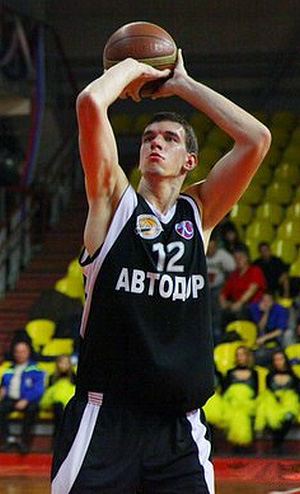
- Klimenko for Avtodor Saratov in 2015

No. 12 – Avtodor Saratov
- Position: Center
- League: VTB United League

Personal information
- Born: January 10, 1994 (age 32) Mariupol, Ukraine
- Listed height: 2.14 m (7 ft 0 in)
- Listed weight: 110 kg (243 lb)

Career information
- NBA draft: 2014: undrafted
- Playing career: 2011–present

Career history
- 2011–2018: Avtodor Saratov
- 2016–2017: →UNICS Kazan
- 2018–2022: UNICS Kazan
- 2022–2024: Zenit Saint Petersburg
- 2024–present: Avtodor Saratov

Career highlights
- United League Young Player of the Year (2016); Russian Super League A champion (2014)

Artem Anatolevich Klimenko (Russian: Артём Анатольевич Клименко; born January 10, 1994) is a Ukrainian professional basketball player for Avtodor Saratov of the VTB United League.

== Professional career ==
In 2011, Klimenko joined BC Avtodor Saratov.

In March 2014, Klimenko announced his intentions to enter the 2014 NBA draft. In May 2014, Avtodor added a buy-out clause to his contract, and he later travelled to the United States to attend various NBA workouts. On June 26, 2014, he went undrafted in the 2014 draft.

In the 2015–16 season, Klimenko won the VTB United League Young Player of the Year award.

Early December 2016, Klimenko signed a contract with the Russian team UNICS Kazan until the end of the 2016–2017 season. On July 10, 2018, Klimenko signed a three-year contract with UNICS.

On July 4, 2022, he has signed with Zenit Saint Petersburg of the VTB United League.
