= Artem Zabelin =

Russian-Israeli basketball player

Artëm Zabelin Артём Забелин
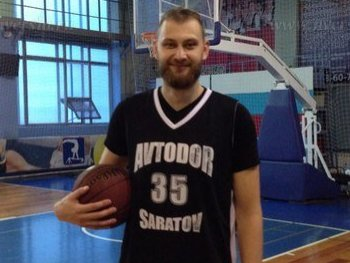
- Zabelin with Avtodor in 2015

No. 35 – Elitzur Shomron
- Position: Center
- League: Liga Leumit

Personal information
- Born: January 15, 1988 (age 38) Khabarovsk, Soviet Union
- Listed height: 2.14 m (7 ft 0 in)
- Listed weight: 110 kg (243 lb)

Career information
- NBA draft: 2010: undrafted
- Playing career: 2003–present

Career history
- 2003–2007: Avtodor
- 2004–2005: Khimik Engles
- 2007–2011: CSKA Moscow
- 2011–2012: Lokomotiv Kuban
- 2012–2013: Spartak Primorye
- 2013–2015: Krasnye Krylia
- 2015–2019: Avtodor
- 2019–2020: Parma
- 2020–2021: Temp-SUMZ-UGMK Revda
- 2021–2022: Parma
- 2022–2023: UNICS
- 2023–2024: Minsk
- 2024–2025: Hapoel Eilat
- 2025–present: Elitzur Shomron

Career highlights
- EuroLeague champion (2008)

Artëm Vladimirovič Zabelin (Russian: Артём Владимирович Забелин; born January 15, 1988) is a Russian-Israeli professional basketball player for Elitzur Shomron of the Liga Leumit. He plays as a center or a power forward.

== Professional career ==
Zabelin made his professional debut with Avtodor Saratov during the 2003–04 season. He joined CSKA Moscow in 2007. In July 2011, he signed a two-year contract with Lokomotiv Kuban. In 2019, Zabelin signed with Parma and averaged 10.4 points and 3.7 rebounds per game. During the 2020–21 season, he signed with Temp-SUMZ-UGMK Revda of the Russian Basketball Super League 1 and averaged 4.7 points and 2.5 rebounds per game. On August 29, 2021, Zabelin returned to Parma.

On July 2, 2022, he has signed with UNICS of the VTB United League.

== Russian national team ==
Zabelin has also been a member of the Russian national junior teams.

== Career statistics ==
Legend
| GP | Games played | GS | Games started | MPG | Minutes per game |
| FG% | Field-goal percentage | 3P% | 3-point field-goal percentage | FT% | Free-throw percentage |
| RPG | Rebounds per game | APG | Assists per game | SPG | Steals per game |
| BPG | Blocks per game | PPG | Points per game | PIR | Performance index rating |
| **Bold** | Career high |

=== EuroLeague ===
| † | Denotes season in which Zabelin won the EuroLeague |

| Year | Team | GP | GS | MPG | FG% | 3P% | FT% | RPG | APG | SPG | BPG | PPG | PIR |
|---|---|---|---|---|---|---|---|---|---|---|---|---|---|
| 2007–08† | CSKA Moscow | **5** | 0 | **4.8** | **.700** | — | **.500** | **.8** | — | — | **.2** | **3.2** | **2.6** |
| 2009–10 | CSKA Moscow | 2 | 0 | 2.5 | .000 | — | — | .5 | — | — | — | 0.0 | 0.0 |
| 2010–11 | CSKA Moscow | 1 | 0 | 1.0 | — | — | — | — | — | — | — | 0.0 | 0.0 |
| Career | | 8 | 0 | 3.8 | .636 | | .500 | .6 | — | — | .1 | 2.0 | 1.6 |
