= Alex Poythress =

American basketball player (born 1993)

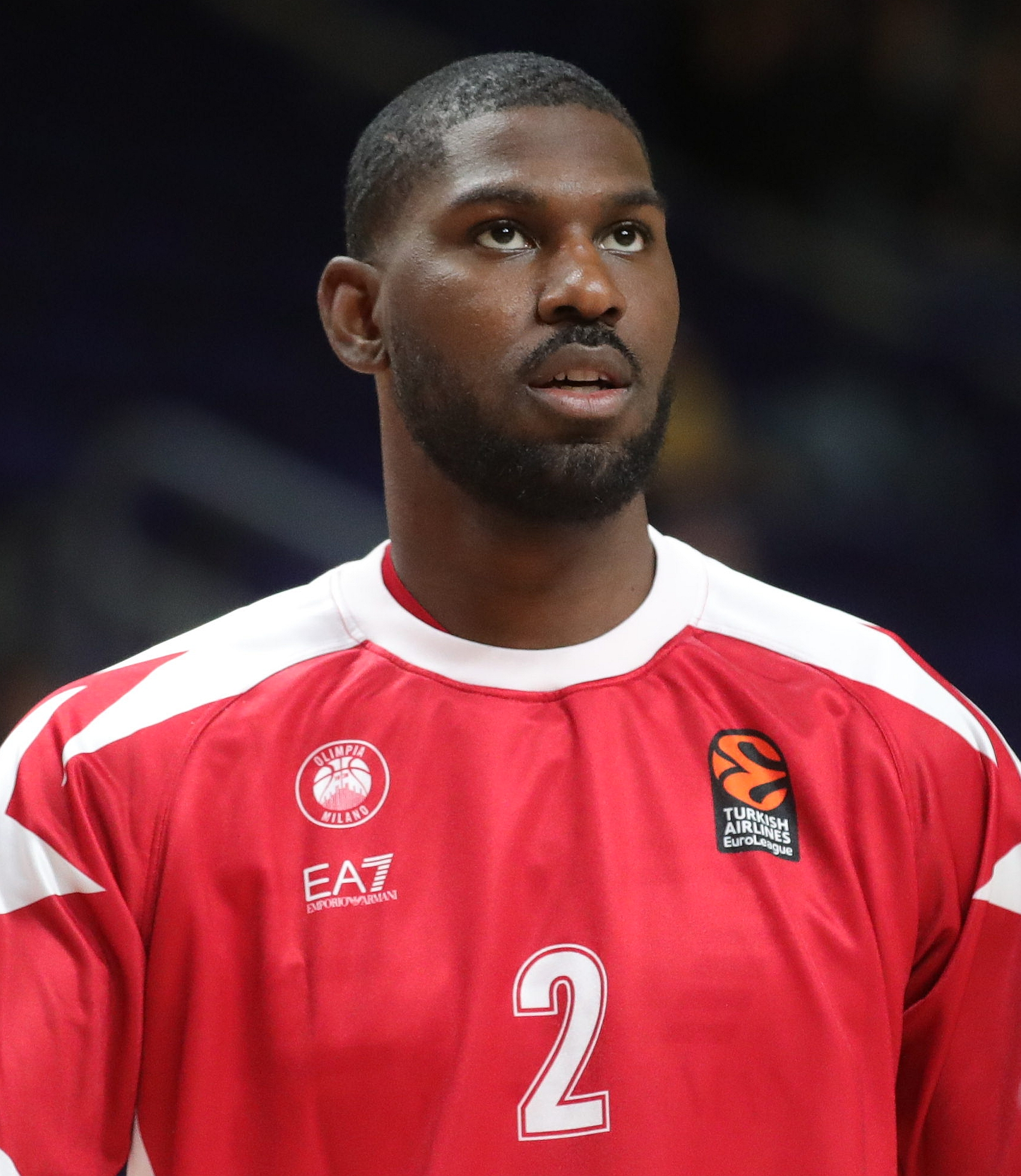
- Poythress in 2023

No. 22 – Zenit Saint Petersburg
- Position: Center / power forward
- League: VTB United League

Personal information
- Born: September 6, 1993 (age 33) Savannah, Georgia, U.S.
- Listed height: 6 ft 9 in (2.06 m)
- Listed weight: 235 lb (107 kg)

Career information
- High school: Northeast (Clarksville, Tennessee)
- College: Kentucky (2012–2016)
- NBA draft: 2016: undrafted
- Playing career: 2016–present

Career history
- 2016–2017: Fort Wayne Mad Ants
- 2017: Philadelphia 76ers
- 2017–2018: Indiana Pacers
- 2017: →Fort Wayne Mad Ants
- 2018–2019: Atlanta Hawks
- 2018–2019: →Erie BayHawks
- 2019–2020: Galatasaray
- 2020–2022: Zenit Saint Petersburg
- 2022–2023: Maccabi Tel Aviv
- 2023–2024: Olimpia Milano
- 2024–present: Zenit Saint Petersburg

Career highlights
- LBA champion (2024); VTB United League champion (2022); Winner League champion (2023); All-VTB United League Second Team (2022); All-NBA D-League Second Team (2017); NBA D-League All-Rookie Team (2017); NBA D-League All-Star (2017); SEC All-Freshman Team (2013); McDonald's All-American (2012); First-team Parade All-American (2012); Class AAA Tennessee Mr. Basketball (2012)
- Stats at NBA.com
- Stats at Basketball Reference

Alex Poythress (born September 6, 1993) is an American-born naturalized Ivorian professional basketball player for Zenit Saint Petersburg of the VTB United League. He won the Gatorade Player of the Year in Tennessee in 2011–12 in his senior year of high school, and was the TSSAA Class AAA Mr. Basketball his senior year. He was a 5-star recruit out of Northeast High School in Clarksville, Tennessee, during 2011–12. He played college basketball for the University of Kentucky. Finished his career with 966 points, 597 rebounds and 77 blocks, becoming just the 12th player in program history with at least 900 points, at least 500 rebounds and at least 70 blocks.

== High school career ==
Poythress was rated as the number 17 player in the class of 2012 in the ESPNU 100, the number 10 player by Scout.com, and the number 8 player by Rivals.com.

Poythress chose Kentucky over offers from Florida, Tennessee, Memphis, and Vanderbilt, among others.

College recruiting
Name	Hometown	School	Height	Weight	Commit date
Alex Poythress; PF	Clarksville, TN	Northeast HS	6 ft 8 in (2.03 m)	215 lb (98 kg)	Nov 10, 2011
Alex Poythress; PF	Recruit ratings: Scout: Rivals: (97)				

== College career ==
On December 12, 2014, Poythress was ruled out for the rest of the 2014–15 season after tearing the anterior cruciate ligament in his left knee during practice the previous day.

Poythress returned to Kentucky for his senior season, and averaged 10.2 points and 6.0 rebounds per game. As of the 2020–21 season, Poythress remained one of only five players to play four scholarship seasons under John Calipari at Kentucky.

== Professional career ==
=== Fort Wayne Mad Ants (2016–2017) ===
After going undrafted in the 2016 NBA draft, Poythress joined the Orlando Magic for the 2016 NBA Summer League. On August 29, 2016, he signed with the Indiana Pacers. He was waived by the Pacers on October 17, 2016, after appearing in two preseason games. On October 31, 2016, he was acquired by the Fort Wayne Mad Ants of the NBA Development League as an affiliate player of the Pacers.

=== Philadelphia 76ers (2017) ===
On April 2, 2017, Poythress signed with the Philadelphia 76ers to help the team deal with numerous injuries. Philadelphia had to use an NBA hardship exemption in order to sign him as he made their roster stand at 16, one over the allowed limited of 15. He made his NBA debut that night, scoring 11 points in 24 minutes off the bench in a 113–105 loss to the Toronto Raptors. On April 11, 2017, he signed with the 76ers for the remainder of the season.

=== Indiana Pacers (2017–2018) ===
On August 22, 2017, Poythress signed a two-way contract by the Indiana Pacers. Under the terms of the deal, he will split time between the Pacers and their G-League affiliate, the Fort Wayne Mad Ants, with him projected to return to Fort Wayne once again for the majority of the season. However, on December 28, 2017, Poythress' contract would be converted into a full, regular season contract despite him playing in only 11 games with the Pacers by that point. On July 6, 2018, he was waived by the Pacers.

=== Atlanta Hawks (2018–2019) ===
On August 20, 2018, Poythress signed a two-way deal with the Atlanta Hawks. Poythress appeared in 21 games for the Hawks (one start), averaging 5.1 points and 3.6 rebounds per game. He also averaged 23.7 points, 9.7 rebounds, 2.7 assists, 1.1 steals and 1.2 blocks in 18 G-League games for the Erie Bayhawks.

On August 12, 2019, Poythress signed with Jilin Northeast Tigers of the CBA.

=== Galatasaray (2019–2020) ===
On December 2, 2019, he signed with Galatasaray of the Turkish Basketbol Süper Ligi (BSL). Poythress averaged 12.9 points and 5.4 rebounds per game for the team.

=== Zenit Saint Petersburg (2020–2022) ===
On July 7, 2020, he signed with Zenit Saint Petersburg of the VTB United League and the EuroLeague. On June 16, 2021, Poythress renewed his contract with the Russian club.

=== Maccabi Tel Aviv (2022–2023) ===
On June 21, 2022, he signed with Maccabi Tel Aviv of the Israeli Basketball Premier League and EuroLeague. In 16 EuroLeague games, he averaged 7.8 points and 3.6 rebounds in 22 minutes per contest.

=== Olimpia Milano (2023–2024) ===
On July 28, 2023, he signed with Olimpia Milano of the Italian Lega Basket Serie A (LBA).

=== Zenit Saint Petersburg (2024–present) ===
On June 26, 2024, he signed with Zenit Saint Petersburg of the Russian VTB United League (VTB).

== International career ==
Poythress received an Ivorian passport in 2022 in order to play for their national team and to not be considered an import player under the Cotonou Agreement.

== Career statistics ==
Legend
GP	Games played	GS	Games started	MPG	Minutes per game
FG%	Field-goal percentage	3P%	3-point field-goal percentage	FT%	Free-throw percentage
RPG	Rebounds per game	APG	Assists per game	SPG	Steals per game
BPG	Blocks per game	PPG	Points per game	PIR	Performance index rating
**Bold**	Career high

=== NBA ===
==== Regular season ====
Year	Team	GP	GS	MPG	FG%	3P%	FT%	RPG	APG	SPG	BPG	PPG
2016–17	Philadelphia	6	**1**	**26.2**	.463	.316	**.800**	**4.8**	**.8**	**.5**	.3	**10.7**
2017–18	Indiana	**25**	0	4.2	.423	.364	–	.7	.1	.1	.0	1.0
2018–19	Atlanta	21	**1**	14.5	**.494**	**.391**	.621	3.6	**.8**	.2	**.5**	5.1
Career		52	2	10.9	.472	.358	.667	2.3	.5	.2	.3	3.8

=== EuroLeague ===
Year	Team	GP	GS	MPG	FG%	3P%	FT%	RPG	APG	SPG	BPG	PPG	PIR
2020–21	Zenit	**32**	7	18.8	.595	.000	.711	**4.3**	.5	.6	**.7**	**8.6**	8.8
2021–22	Zenit	23	5	20.2	**.628**	.000	.766	4.2	**.9**	**.7**	.6	7.7	**9.8**
2022–23	Maccabi Tel Aviv	16	**13**	**22.3**	.545	**.200**	.587	3.6	.8	.5	.6	7.8	7.4
2023–24	Olimpia Milano	30	9	12.8	.598	**.200**	**.793**	2.7	.1	.3	.4	5.3	4.7
Career		101	34	17.9	.595	.125	.707	3.7	.5	.5	.5	7.3	7.6

=== EuroCup ===
Year	Team	GP	GS	MPG	FG%	3P%	FT%	RPG	APG	SPG	BPG	PPG	PIR
2019–20	Galatasaray	7	6	27.9	.473	.333	.840	7.1	1.6	.3	.9	13.6	14.3
Career		7	6	27.9	.473	.333	.840	7.1	1.6	.3	.9	13.6	14.3

=== Domestic leagues ===
Year	Team	League	GP	MPG	FG%	3P%	FT%	RPG	APG	SPG	BPG	PPG
2016–17	(United States) Fort Wayne Mad Ants	D-League	46	31.1	.528	.403	.783	7.1	1.5	.7	1.4	18.5
2017–18	(United States) Fort Wayne Mad Ants	G League	7	34.1	.482	.227	.675	8.9	2.7	.9	1.4	20.0
2018–19	(United States) Erie BayHawks	G League	18	34.8	.516	.296	.698	9.7	2.9	1.2	1.3	23.7
2019–20	(Turkey) Galatasaray	TBSL	13	26.8	.508	.174	.629	5.9	1.0	.7	.5	12.3
2020–21	(Russia) Zenit	VTBUL	18	18.7	.670	.000	.696	4.1	.7	1.0	.7	9.2
2021–22	(Russia) Zenit	VTBUL	21	25.7	.724	.000	.726	5.7	1.8	1.0	.7	12.1
2022–23	(Israel) Maccabi Tel Aviv	Ligat HaAl	14	20.4	.708	.000	.657	5.2	1.4	.6	.6	10.6
2023–24	(Italy) Olimpia Milano	LBA	18	15.3	.534	.000	.673	3.3	.3	.6	.3	7.3

=== College ===
Year	Team	GP	GS	MPG	FG%	3P%	FT%	RPG	APG	SPG	BPG	PPG
2012–13	Kentucky	33	**31**	**25.8**	.581	**.424**	.689	**6.0**	**.7**	.3	.4	**11.2**
2013–14	Kentucky	**40**	0	18.4	.497	.242	.625	4.5	.4	.3	.7	5.9
2014–15	Kentucky	8	8	20.3	.381	.000	**.857**	3.8	.3	.5	**1.5**	5.5
2015–16	Kentucky	31	23	23.6	**.601**	.304	.706	**6.0**	.3	**.6**	.7	10.2
Career		112	62	22.1	.551	.302	.686	5.3	.5	.4	0.7	8.6
