= Kenny Chery =

Canadian basketball player

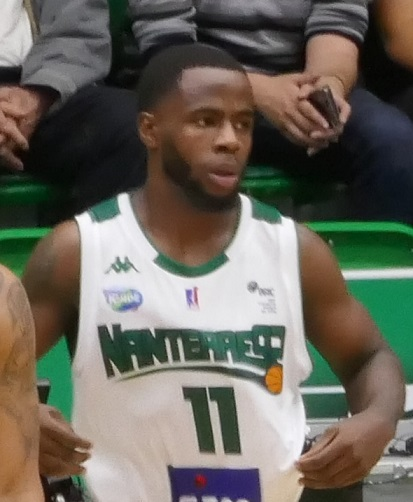

Free agent
- Position: Point guard

Personal information
- Born: January 24, 1992 (age 34) Montreal, Quebec, Canada
- Listed height: 1.80 m (5 ft 11 in)
- Listed weight: 82 kg (181 lb)

Career information
- High school: Archbishop Carroll (Washington, D.C.)
- College: State Fair CC (2011–2013); Baylor (2013–2015)
- NBA draft: 2015: undrafted
- Playing career: 2015–present

Career history
- 2015–2016: Alba Fehérvár
- 2016–2017: CB Sevilla
- 2017–2018: Gipuzkoa Basket
- 2018–2019: Boulazac Basket Dordogne
- 2019–2020: Nanterre 92
- 2020–2021: Brescia
- 2021–2022: Avtodor
- 2022: Herbalife Gran Canaria
- 2022–2023: Petkim Spor
- 2023: Joventut Badalona
- 2024: Bàsquet Girona
- 2026: Juventus Utena

Career highlights
- Second-team All-Big 12 (2015)

Kenny Fred Chery (born January 24, 1992) is a Canadian professional basketball player who recently played for Juventus Utena of the Lithuanian Basketball League (LKL). He competed with State Fair Community College and then Baylor at the collegiate level.

== Early years ==
Chery was born in Montreal, Quebec to Haitian parents in a household where Creole was spoken only, while he learned French in school. Growing up, Chery played hockey but gradually switched to basketball as he participated in basketball leagues as a teenager around Montreal. In the summertime he would annually visit his cousin Peter Jean-Baptiste in Brooklyn, New York where he'd play pick-up games at outdoor basketball courts against talented older players further developing his game early on. It was during these visits Chery began to learn to speak English as well.

== High school career ==
Chery moved to Washington, D.C. as a junior in high school on a scholarship to Archbishop Carroll High School, where he played against some of the best high school teams on the East Coast. Playing under Michael Adams, Chery received some Division I recruiting interest, but schools pulled their scholarships after it became apparent he would not be academically eligible. This was due to some Canadian courses not transferring, so Chery opted for junior college.

=== National tournament ===
In 2008, Chery participated in the Canadian U17 Boys National Championship where he received MVP honors leading Quebec to a gold medal after going undefeated (5-0), in a tournament where fellow Canadians (and now NBA players) Cory Joseph and Kelly Olynyk participated in.

== College career ==
Chery played two seasons at State Fair Community College in which he became regarded as one of the best junior college players in the country. As a sophomore, he posted 16.4 points and 3.7 assists per game, shooting 49.4 percent from the field and 44.6 percent from behind the arc to help lead the Roadrunners to a 20-10 record. He was named a National Junior College Athletic Association honorable mention all-America. In April 2013, he committed to Baylor, turning down offers from UCLA, Wichita State and Arizona State.

Chery missed some time in January 2014 with a turf toe injury. He had the sixth triple-double in school history with 20 points, 12 assists and 10 rebounds in a win against Kansas State on February 15. He averaged 11.5 points and 4.9 rebounds per game as a junior at Baylor. As a senior, Chery was named to the Second-team All-Big 12. He averaged 11.3 points, 3.1 rebounds and 4.1 assists per game as a senior.

== Professional career ==
After going undrafted in the 2015 NBA draft, Chery signed with the Hungarian team Alba Fehérvár. He averaged 14.2 points, 3.2 rebounds and 2.8 assists per game in Hungary. On August 27, 2016 he signed with CB Sevilla of the liga ACB. Chery averaged 9 points, 1.7 assists and 2.5 rebounds per game for the squad. The following season, he signed with Gipuzkoa Basket. He averaged 14 points per game. On August 4, 2018, Chery signed with Boulazac Basket Dordogne of the French LNB Pro A.

On July 3, 2019, he has signed with Nanterre 92 of the LNB Pro A. Chery averaged 14 points and 3.5 assists per game. On June 27, 2020, Chery signed with Brescia.

On August 30, 2021, he has signed with the Russian team Avtodor of the VTB United League. He left the team after the 2022 Russian invasion of Ukraine. Cherry averaged 10.8 points, 5.3 assists, 3.9 rebounds, and 1.6 steals per game.

On March 19, 2022, he signed with Herbalife Gran Canaria of the Liga ACB.

On October 23, 2022, he has signed with Petkim Spor of the Basketbol Süper Ligi (BSL).

== Career statistics ==
Legend
GP	Games played	GS	Games started	MPG	Minutes per game
FG%	Field goal percentage	3P%	3-point field goal percentage	FT%	Free throw percentage
RPG	Rebounds per game	APG	Assists per game	SPG	Steals per game
BPG	Blocks per game	PPG	Points per game	**Bold**	Career high
*	Led the league

=== College ===
Year	Team	GP	GS	MPG	FG%	3P%	FT%	RPG	APG	SPG	BPG	PPG
2013–14	Baylor	37	34	28.9	.423	.325	.879	2.6	4.7	0.9	0.1	11.5
2014–15	Baylor	29	28	32.4	.381	.377	.824	3.1	4.1	1.4	0.0	11.3
Career		66	62	30.4	.404	.353	.858	2.8	4.4	1.1	0.0	11.4
