= Ice Sports Palace Kristall =

Indoor arena in Saratov, Russia

- Ледовый дворец спорта Кристалл
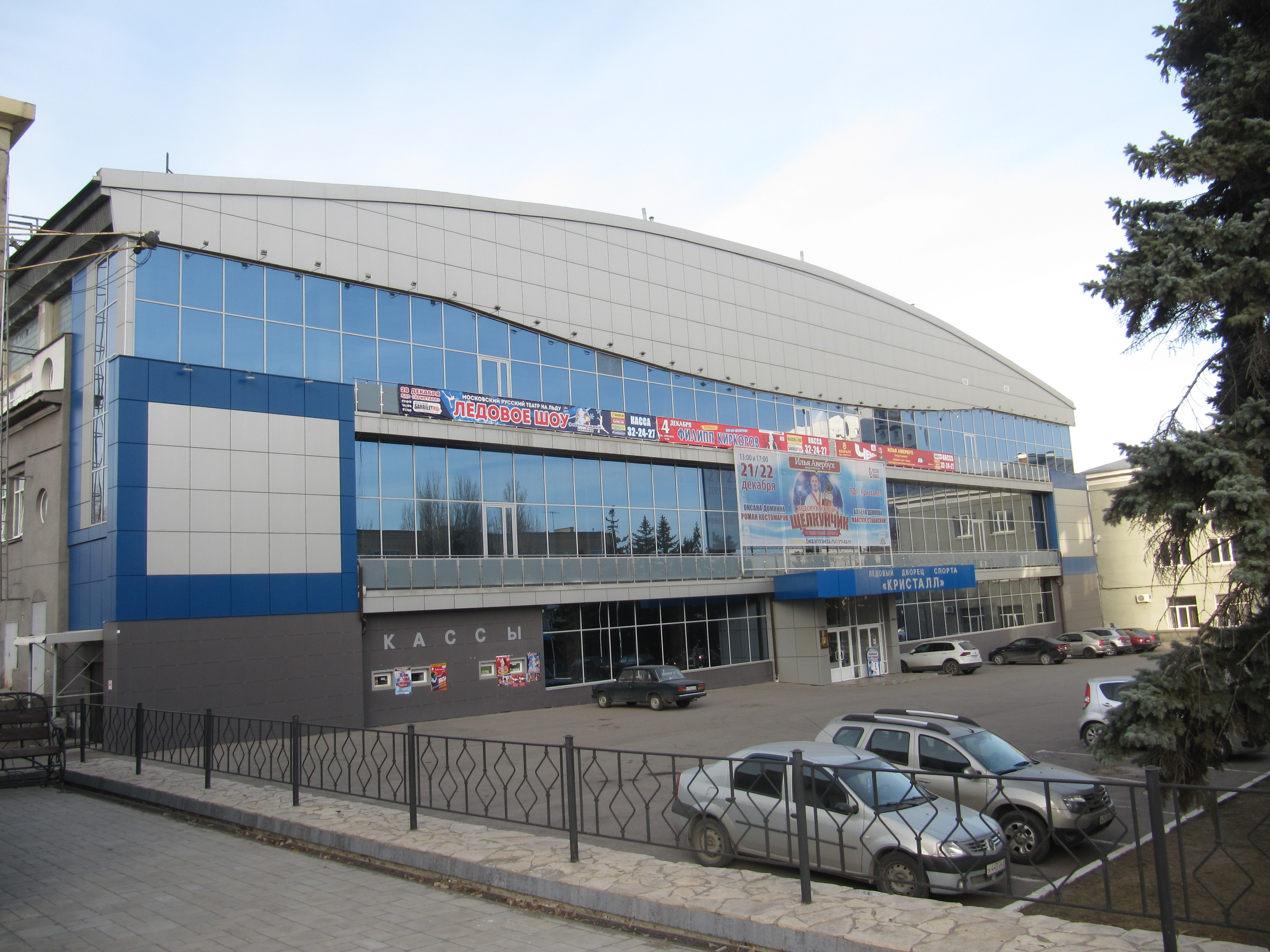
- Interactive map of Ice Sports Palace Kristall
- Location: Saratov, Russia
- Coordinates: 51.5143333°N 45.9956111°E
- Capacity: 6,100
- Surface: Ice, parquet

Construction
- Opened: 1969
- Renovated: 2014
- Architect: L.E. Doroshenko

Tenants
- Kristall Saratov; Avtodor Saratov

Ice Sports Palace Kristall (Russian: Ледовый дворец спорта Кристалл, romanized: Ledovyy dvorets sporta Kristall, abbreviated: ЛДС Кристалл, romanized: LDS Kristall) is an indoor arena and multi-purpose stadium in Saratov, Russia. Originally opened in 1969, it has a seating capacity of 6,100 and is used for ice sports, basketball games, and concerts. The arena serves as home venue to Kristall Saratov, an ice hockey team in the Supreme Hockey League, and Avtodor Saratov, a basketball team in the VTB United League.

== History ==
LDS Kristall was the third and final venue constructed as part of the sports complex on Chernyshevskogo Street in Saratov, joining the Sports Palace (Дворец спорта), built in 1958, and the Swimming Pool Saratov (Бассейн Саратов), built during 1959 to 1961.

The building was designed by architect and civil engineer Leonid Efremovich Doroshenko and was erected on the site of an outdoor ice rink, which it replaced. The 5,450 seat venue opened to the public in autumn 1969 and has continuously served as the home venue of Kristall Saratov since that time.

Extensive renovations were completed in 2014 and the seating capacity was increased to 6,100.
