= BC Avtodor =

Professional basketball team in Saratov, Russia

Avtodor Saratov
- League: VTB United League
- Founded: 1960; 66 years ago
- History: List: Spartak Saratov (1960–1972) Avtodorozhnik Saratov (1972–1996) Avtodor Saratov (1996–present)
- Arena: Sports Palace Kristall
- Capacity: 6,100
- Location: Saratov, Russia
- President: Oleg Rodionov
- Head coach: Rostislav Vergun
- Championships: 2 Russian Super League
- Website: www.avtodor.ru
Home	Away

BC Avtodor (Russian: БК «Автодор» Саратов), commonly known as simply Avtodor and internationally as Avtodor Saratov, is a Russian professional basketball club based in Saratov. It plays in the VTB United League, the highest level of Russian basketball. In early 2022, after the 2022 Russian invasion of Ukraine, Americans D. J. Funderburk and Grant Jerrett and Canadians Kenny Chery and Philip Scrubb left the team.

== History ==
=== Establishment and growth (1960–1992) ===
Founded in 1960 as Spartak Saratov, former player Vladimir Rodionov became its head coach in the 1982. The club was later renamed into Avtodorozhnik (road engineer) - shortened to Avtodor in 1996 - in reference to a late benefactor.

=== Scaling the heights (1992–2004) ===
Joining the Russian League at its creation in 1992, the club competed with CSKA Moscow (being the first club to defeat them in the league) for national supremacy during the rest of the decade, finishing in second place four times between 1994 and 1999. It would win the regular season in both 1997 and 1998, but lost both finals series against CSKA 2–3, and 1–3 respectively.

The Russian outfit regularly took part in European competitions during that period, reaching the semifinals of the 1998 second-tier EuroCup and playing in the 1999 top-tier EuroLeague (exiting at the first group stage). Avtodor defeated CSKA in the 2001–02 playoff quarterfinals, the only team to have prevented the Army men from reaching the top four in Russian basketball history.

=== Demise and rebuilding (2004–2014) ===
After threatening to do so for years because of disputes with the local administration, especially regarding the lack of a convenient arena, Rodionov moved the organisation to Saint Petersburg during the 2004 summer. He would form Dynamo Saint Petersburg, transferring some of Avtodor's best players such as Vladimir Veremeenko, and its place in the Super League.

Meanwhile, a cash-strapped Avtodor voluntarily relegated itself to the second division for 2004–05, fielding an noncompetitive side made of youngsters, before moving down to the third division in 2005. Avtodor would win the second division in 2009 but did not have the financial means to return to the Super League. It did return to the Super League in 2012 but by that time the league had become the domestic second division. Winning that league in 2014, in large part thanks to the play of league MVP Courtney Fortson and promising youngster Artem Klimenko, the club received an invitation to play in the top-tier VTB United League and the European third-tier EuroChallenge for 2014-15.

The club was able to fund its participation thanks to increased support from the local administration, who reduced the funding of the city's ice hockey club Kristall Saratov to compensate.

=== Back at the top (2014–2019) ===
After losing seven of its first nine VTB League games, Avtodor regrouped with the help of November acquisition Kyrylo Fesenko and the play of December league MVP Fortson. Despite three coaching changes, with Vladimir Antsiferov replaced by his assistant Sergey Mokin in late October before Rodionov fired Mokin and took the coaching reins himself on 3 March 2015, the club reached the EuroChallenge quarterfinals where they lost to Trabzonspor.

In the league, Avtodor beat sides CSKA Moscow, Khimki Moscow Region, Lokomotiv Kuban Krasnodar and Unics Kazan to reach the playoffs, but lost three contested games against Khimki to exit at the quarterfinal stage.

=== 2020-present ===
In early 2022, after the 2022 Russian invasion of Ukraine, Americans D. J. Funderburk and Grant Jerrett and Canadians Kenny Chery and Philip Scrubb left the team.

== Arena ==
Avtodor formerly played in the Yunost arena, seating only a few hundred and unable to accommodate television broadcasts, which meant the side had to play its European games in Moscow. During the 1997–98 season, the club played its regular-season games in the Yunost arena before moving for its playoffs games to an indoor-football arena whilst a new arena was being refurbished.

It moved to the newly reopened 1,500 seat Zvezdny Sports Palace in May of that year, though this arena also proved too small as 2,000 fans packed the venue during a 21 May 1998 game against CSKA (albeit the league title decisive game), with some hanging from the balcony.

Calls for the club to move in the larger Kristall Arena (an ice hockey arena built in 1969), were finally heeded in 2014. Avtodor remodeled the arena for basketball play, which also raised the capacity from 5,450 to 6,100 seats, playing their first game there on November 11.

== Honours ==
=== Domestic competitions ===
- Russian First Division
  - Runners-up (4): 1994, 1997, 1998, 1999
  - Regular season champions (2): 1997, 1998
- Russian Second Division
  - Champions (2): 2009, 2014

== Season by season ==
Season	Domestic competitions			Russian Cup	European competitions		
Season	Tier	League	Pos.	Russian Cup	Tier	League	Result
1993–94	1	Super League	2nd	Not held	3	Korać Cup	2R
1994–95	1	Super League	4th	Not held	2	Saporta Cup	1R
1995–96	1	Super League	3rd	Not held	3	Korać Cup	16F
1996–97	1	Super League	2nd	Not held	2	Saporta Cup	8F
1997–98	1	Super League	2nd	Not held	2	Saporta Cup	SF
1998–99	1	Super League	2nd	Not held	1	Euroleague	1GS
1999–00	1	Super League	6th	Withdrew	2	Saporta Cup	GS
2000–01	1	Super League	6th	Not held	3	Korać Cup	8F
2001–02	1	Super League	4th	Not held	3	Korać Cup	8F
2002–03	1	Super League	6th	Quarterfinals	4	Europe Cup	CGS
2003–04	1	Super League	10th	Round of 16	4	Europe Cup	QF
2004–05	2	Super League	10th	DNP			
2005–06	3	Higher League	8th	DNP			
2006–07	3	Higher League	8th	Group stage			
2007–08	3	Higher League	8th	Group stage			
2008–09	2	Super League	1st	DNP			
2009–10	3	Higher League	12th	DNP			
2010–11	3	Higher League	9th	Group stage			
2011–12	3	Higher League	5th	Round of 16			
2012–13	2	Super League	3rd	Round of 16			
2013–14	2	Super League	1st	Quarterfinalist			
2014–15	1	VTB United League	7th	Group stage (Note: Avtodor sent its B squad)	3	EuroChallenge	QF
2015–16	1	VTB United League	6th	DNP	2	Eurocup	L32
2016–17	1	VTB United League	10th	Round of 64	3	Champions League	POQ
2017–18	1	VTB United League	6th		3	Champions League	QR3
2017–18	1	VTB United League	6th		4	FIBA Europe Cup	RS
2018–19	1	VTB United League			3	Champions League	QR1
2018–19	1	VTB United League			4	FIBA Europe Cup	L16
2019–20	1	VTB United League	12th				
2020–21	1	VTB United League	9th				
2021–22	1	VTB United League	6th		4	FIBA Europe Cup	RS
2022–23	1	VTB United League	8th				

== Current roster ==
Note: Flags indicate national team eligibility at FIBA-sanctioned events. Players may hold other non-FIBA nationalities not displayed.

Avtodor Saratov roster
Players
Coaches

Pos.	No.	Nat.	Name	Ht.	Age
G	1	(Russia)	Pranauskis, Vytalius	1.94 m (6 ft 4 in)	23 – 8 December 2002
PF	3	(Serbia)	Beslać, Dušan	2.06 m (6 ft 9 in)	27 – 6 October 1998
PF	4	(Russia)	Evseev, Alexandr	2.06 m (6 ft 9 in)	24 – 14 February 2002
F	6	(Russia)	Fedorov, Andrey	1.98 m (6 ft 6 in)	22 – 19 August 2003
SG	8	(United States)	Edwards Jr., Terrence	1.98 m (6 ft 6 in)	24 – 20 May 2002
G	9	(Russia)	Motovilov, Grigory	1.91 m (6 ft 3 in)	28 – 7 February 1998
C	12	(Russia)	Klimenko, Artem	2.13 m (7 ft 0 in)	32 – 10 January 1994
F	13	(Russia)	Volkhin, Igor	2.00 m (6 ft 7 in)	28 – 30 October 1997
SG	14	(United States)	Newman, Malik	1.91 m (6 ft 3 in)	29 – 21 February 1997
F	24	(Russia)	Iakovlev, Dmitri	1.98 m (6 ft 6 in)	21 – 12 October 2004
F	31	(Belarus)	Kosko, Daniil	1.98 m (6 ft 6 in)	22 – 21 March 2004
C	44	(Qatar)	Hadzibegovic, Alen	2.08 m (6 ft 10 in)	27 – 19 March 1999
PG	52	(United States)	Hamilton, Alex	1.93 m (6 ft 4 in)	32 – 5 October 1993

Head coach

- (Serbia) Milenko Bogićević

Assistant coach(es)

- (Serbia) Petar Zlatanović
- (Russia) Vladislav Melnikov

Legend

- (C) Team captain
- Injured

- Roster
Updated: December 20, 2025

== Notable players ==
2020s

- (Russia) Evgeny Kolesnikov 4 seasons: '15–'17, '21–
- (Russia) Nikita Mikhailovskii 5 seasons: '17–'21, '22–
- (Canada) Kenny Chery 1 season: '21–'22
- (United States) Jaron Johnson 1 season: '21–'22

2010s

- (United States) Justin Robinson 1 season: '17–'18
- (United States) Coty Clarke 1 season: '17–'18
- (United States) Nick Minnerath 1 season: '16–'17
- (Russia) Artem Zabelin 4 seasons: '15–19
- (Ukraine) Kyrylo Fesenko 1 season: '14–'15
- (United States) Courtney Fortson 2 seasons: '13–'15
- (Russia) Ivan Strebkov 1 1/2 seasons: '13–'14
- (Ukraine) Artem Klimenko 3 seasons: '12–18

2000s

- (Russia) Semyon Antonov 3 seasons: '06–'09
- (Russia) Artem Zabelin 3 seasons: '03–'07, '15-present
- (Russia) Yaroslav Korolev 1 season: '03–'04
- (Slovenia) Beno Udrih 1 season: '03–'04
- (Belarus) Vladimir Veremeenko 2 seasons: '02–'04
- (Russia) Nikita Morgunov 1/2 season: '02
- (United States) Kebu Stewart 1 season: '01–'02
- (Russia) Victor Khryapa 2 seasons: '00–'02
- (Russia) Sergei Monia 2 seasons: '00–'02

1990s

- (Russia) Andrei Fetisov 1 season: '98–'99
- (Russia) Sergei Chikalkin 1 season: '98–'99
- (Ukraine) Grigorij Khizhnyak 1 season: '98–'99
- (Latvia) Roberts Štelmahers 1/2 season: '98
- (Nigeria) Julius Nwosu 1/2 season: '98
- (Lithuania) Darius Lukminas 2 seasons: '96–'98
- (Russia) Evgeniy Pashutin 4 seasons: '95–'99
- (Russia) Zakhar Pashutin 4 seasons: '95–'99
- (Lithuania) Gintaras Einikis 4 seasons: '95–'99
- (Russia) Vitaly Nosov 1 season: '92–'93

== Head coaches ==
- 2014 (Russia) Vladimir Antsiferov
- 2014—2015 (Russia) Sergei Mokin
- 2015 (Russia) Vladimir Rodionov
- 2015 (United States) Brad Greenberg
- 2015—2016 (Russia) Alexei Vasilyev
- 2016 (Russia) Vladimir Antsiferov
- 2016 (Latvia) Nikolajs Mazurs
- 2016 (Russia) Sergei Mokin
- 2016—2017 (Russia) Vladimir Antsiferov
- 2017 (Italy) Andrea Mazzon
- 2017—2018 (Russia) Evgeniy Pashutin
- 2018 (Russia) Sergei Mokin
- 2018—2019 (Serbia) Dušan Alimpijević
- 2019 (Russia) Evgeniy Pashutin
- 2019—2020 (Bosnia and Herzegovina) Predrag Krunić
- 2020 (Lithuania) Donaldas Kairys
- 2020—2021 (Canada) Gordon Herbert
- 2021 (Russia) Vladislav Konovalov (interim)
- 2021—2022 (North Macedonia) Emil Rajković
- 2022 (Russia) Vladislav Konovalov (interim)
- 2022 (Serbia) Nebojša Vidić
- 2022 (Montenegro) Miloš Pavićević
- 2022—2023 (Serbia) Darko Ruso
- 2023 (Serbia) Branislav Vićentić
- 2023-present (Serbia) Milenko Bogićević
