= 2013 FIBA EuroChallenge Final Four =

Tournament details
- Arena: Karşıyaka Arena; İzmir, Turkey
- Dates: 26 – 28 April 2013

Final positions
- Champions: (Russia) Krasnye Krylia Samara (1st title)
- Runners-up: (Turkey) Pınar Karşıyaka
- Third place: (Germany) EWE Baskets Oldenburg
- Fourth place: (France) BCM Gravelines

Awards and statistics
- MVP: (United States) Chester Simmons

The 2013 FIBA EuroChallenge Final Four was the concluding tournament of the 2012–13 FIBA EuroChallenge season. The Final Four was held in the Karşıyaka Arena at İzmir, Turkey.

== Bracket ==
Semifinals; 26 April
(Turkey) Pınar Karşıyaka	66
(Germany) EWE Baskets	62
(France) BCM Gravelines	78
(Russia) Krasnye Krylia	81

Final; 28 April
(Turkey) Pınar Karşıyaka	76
(Russia) Krasnye Krylia	77
Third place game
(Germany) EWE Baskets	84
(France) BCM Gravelines	76

== Semifinals ==
26 April 2013
17:30 (EET)

Report

BCM Gravelines (France)	78–81	(Russia) Krasnye Krylia Samara
Scoring by quarter: 12-23, 22-18, 24-21, 20-19
Pts: Buycks 21; Rebs: Akpomedah 6 Asts: Edwards 3		Pts: Thomas 28; Rebs: Smith 7 Asts: Miles 7

Karşıyaka Arena, İzmir
Attendance: 2,550
Referees: Sreten Radovic (CRO), Neil Wilkinson (ENG), Markos Michaelides (SUI)

26 April 2013
20:00 (EET)

Report

Pınar Karşıyaka (Turkey)	66–62	(Germany) EWE Baskets Oldenburg
Scoring by quarter: 17-17, 13-11, 17-18, 19-16
Pts: Dixon 18; Rebs: Paçun, Mutaf 7 Asts: Dixon 6		Pts: Chubb 19; Rebs: Chubb 8 Asts: Chubb, Kramer 2

Karşıyaka Arena, İzmir
Attendance: 5,000
Referees: Milivoje Jovcic (SRB), Benjamin Jimenez Trujillo (ESP), Saverio Lanzarini (ITA)

== Third place game ==
28 April 2013
16:30 (EET)

Report

EWE Baskets Oldenburg (Germany)	84–76	(France) BCM Gravelines
Scoring by quarter: 23-20, 13-18, 21-16, 27-22
Pts: Jenkins 22; Rebs: Chubb 8 Asts: Kramer 8		Pts: Vaty 22; Rebs: Vaty 10; Asts: Bokolo 5

Karşıyaka Arena, İzmir
Attendance: 5,000
Referees: Sreten Radovic (CRO), Neil Wilkinson (ENG), Milos Koljensic (MNE)

== Final ==
28 April 2013
19:00 (EET)

Report

Pınar Karşıyaka (Turkey)	76–77	(Russia) Krasnye Krylia Samara
Scoring by quarter: 20-17, 26-17, 9-20, 21-23
Pts: Dixon 23; Rebs: Dixon, Aminu 5 Asts: Dixon 6		Pts: Collins, Simmons 18; Rebs: Thomas, Smith 7 Asts: Collins 4

Karşıyaka Arena, İzmir
Attendance: 5,000
Referees: Milivoje Jovcic (SRB), Benjamin Jimenez Trujillo (ESP), Saverio Lanzarini (ITA)

Pınar Karşıyaka	Krasnye Krylia

Starters:			Pts	Reb	Ast
PG	13	(United States) Bobby Dixon	23	6	4
SG	32	(United States) Jon Diebler	4	2	0
SF	8	(Turkey) Caner Topaloglu	2	2	0
PF	6	(United States) Will Thomas	10	4	1
C	4	(United States) Abdul Aminu	12	5	0
Reserves:					
G	23	(Turkey) Maxim Mutaf	16	1	2
G	34	(Turkey) Soner Sentürk	12	5	0
F	11	(Turkey) Ümit Sonkol	8	3	1
C	41	(Turkey) Bora Pacun	1	0	1
F	24	(United States) Melvin Sanders	0	2	1
G	5	(Turkey) Evren Büker	DNP		
G	7	(Turkey) Serkan Mentese	DNP		
G	8	(Turkey) Can Korkmaz	DNP		
Head coach:
(Turkey) Ufuk Sarica

Game rules

Game played with FIBA rules.

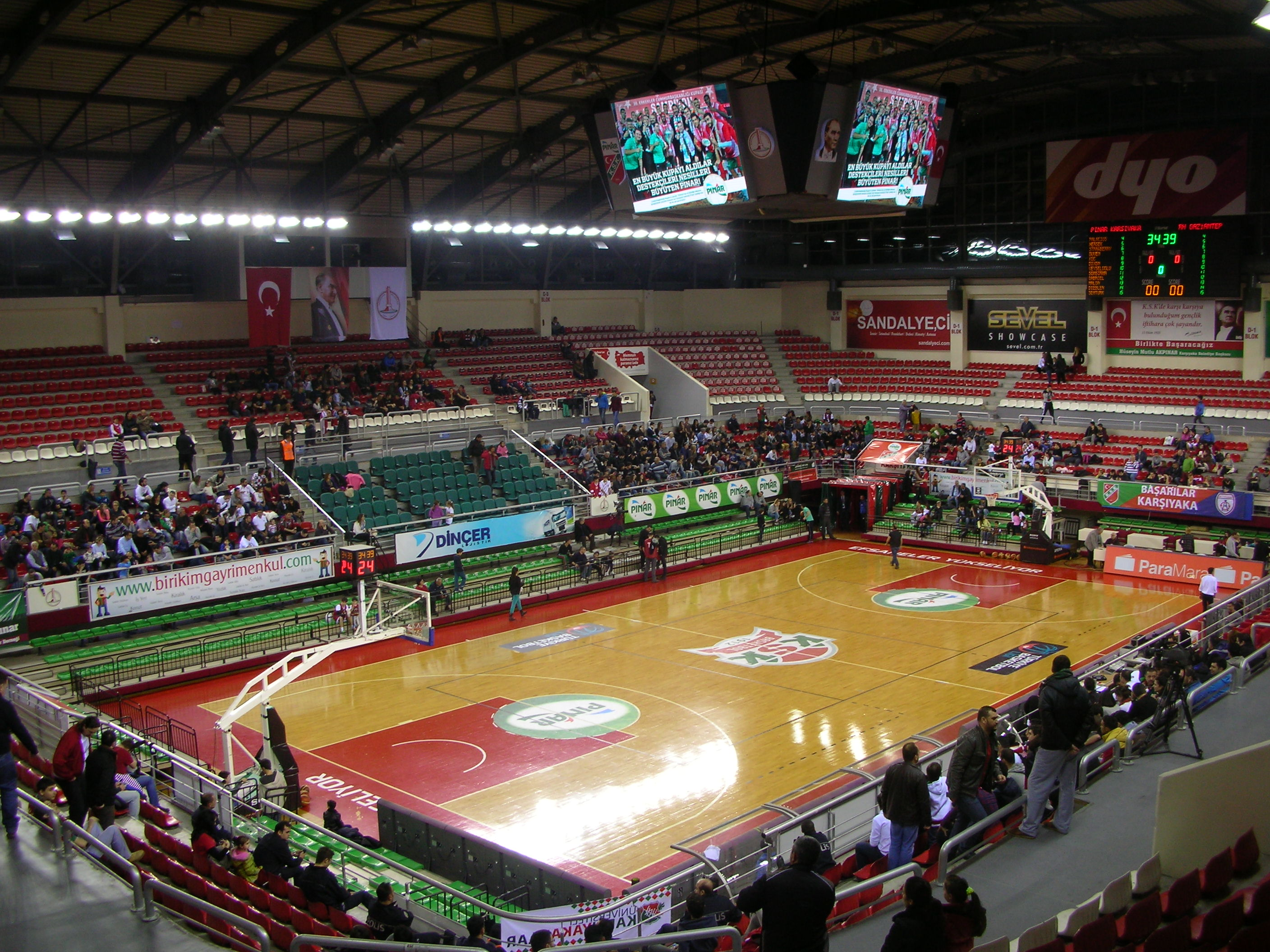
Karşıyaka Arena

Starters:			Pts	Reb	Ast
PG	32	(United States) Aaron Miles	23	6	4
SG	24	(Russia) Evgeny Kolesnikov	0	3	0
SF	13	(United States) Chester Simmons	18	3	0
PF	4	(United States) Omar Thomas	9	7	3
C	12	(United States) Andre Smith	14	7	0
Reserves:					
G/F	6	(Russia) Dimitrii Kulagin	3	1	0
SG	7	(Russia) Viktor Zaryazhko	DNP		
G	23	(United States) DeJuan Collins	18	2	4
PF	8	(United States) Lamayn Wilson	5	6	2
C	10	(Russia) Yury Vasiliev	0	1	0
C	14	(Russia) Anton Pushkov	2	4	0
Head coach:
(Russia) Sergey Bazarevich
