= Eurocup Basketball 2013–14 Last 32 Group K =

Standings and Results for Group K of the Last 32 phase of the 2013–14 Eurocup basketball tournament.

== Standings ==
	Team	Pld	W	L	PF	PA	Diff	Tie-break
1.	(Russia) Khimki	6	6	0	525	421	+104	
2.	(Czech Republic) ČEZ Nymburk	6	2	4	470	486	–16	2–2 (+11)
3.	(Italy) Montepaschi Siena	6	2	4	461	481	–20	2–2 (–2)
4.	(Israel) Maccabi Haifa	6	2	4	406	474	–68	2–2 (–9)

== Fixtures and results ==
=== Game 1 ===
8 January 2014
19:00 CET

Boxscore

Maccabi Haifa (Israel)	80–75	(Czech Republic) ČEZ Nymburk
Scoring by quarter: 21–16, 26–28, 18–19, 15–12
Pts: Yivzori 17; Rebs: Smith 8 Asts: Smith 9		Pts: Simmons 23; Rebs: Mahalbašić 9 Asts: Ilievski, Mahalbašić 3

Romema Arena, Haifa
Attendance: 1,100
Referees: Emin Mogulkoc (TUR), Sergiy Chebyshev (UKR), Zdravko Rutesic (MNE)

8 January 2014
20:30 CET

Boxscore

Montepaschi Siena (Italy)	69–75	(Russia) Khimki
Scoring by quarter: 22–23, 13–14, 13–21, 21–17
Pts: Carter 17; Rebs: Carter, Hunter 5 Asts: Haynes 4		Pts: Augustine 19; Rebs: Augustine 15; Asts: Green 7

Palaestra, Siena
Attendance: 3,020
Referees: Juan Carlos Arteaga (ESP), Panagiotis Anastopoulos (GRE), Benjamin Jimenez (ESP)

=== Game 2 ===
15 January 2014
16:30 CET

Boxscore

Khimki (Russia)	87–48	(Israel) Maccabi Haifa
Scoring by quarter: 19–5, 26–19, 28–9, 14–15
Pts: Lončar 18; Rebs: Lončar 10; Asts: Green 9		Pts: Yivzori 11; Rebs: Kozikaro 5 Asts: three players 3

Basketball Center, Khimki
Attendance: 2,000
Referees: Marek Cmikiewicz (POL), Apostolos Kalpakas (GRE), Jasmina Juras (SRB)

15 January 2014
18:30 CET

Boxscore

ČEZ Nymburk (Czech Republic)	78–75	(Italy) Montepaschi Siena
Scoring by quarter: 16–12, 21–26, 18–16, 23–21
Pts: Page 22; Rebs: Mahalbašić 8 Asts: Simmons 5		Pts: Haynes 14; Rebs: Nelson 9 Asts: Nelson 4

Sportovní Centrum, Nymburk
Attendance: 4,300
Referees: Srdan Dozai (CRO), Nicola Maestre (FRA), Mario Majkic (SLO)

=== Game 3 ===
22 January 2014
18:00 CET

Boxscore

ČEZ Nymburk (Czech Republic)	80–86 (OT)	(Russia) Khimki
Scoring by quarter: 20–20, 26–18, 8–16, 18–18, Overtime: 8–14
Pts: Rančík 17; Rebs: Mahalbašić 9 Asts: Welsch 5		Pts: Popović 24; Rebs: Monia, Green 7 Asts: Green 8

Sportovní Centrum, Nymburk
Attendance: 1,625
Referees: Tolga Sahin (TUR), Sinisa Herceg (CRO), Serhiy Zashchuk (UKR)

22 January 2014
19:00 CET

Boxscore

Maccabi Haifa (Israel)	86–66	(Italy) Montepaschi Siena
Scoring by quarter: 19–17, 15–21, 27–9, 25–19
Pts: Smith 24; Rebs: Smith 6 Asts: Smith, Roth 6		Pts: Hunter 17; Rebs: Nelson 8 Asts: Haynes, Nelson 5

Romema Arena, Haifa
Attendance: 1,900
Referees: Andrej Jersan (SLO), Eddie Viator (FRA), Milija Vojinovic (SRB)

=== Game 4 ===
29 January 2014
16:30 CET

Boxscore

Khimki (Russia)	106–85	(Czech Republic) ČEZ Nymburk
Scoring by quarter: 24–16, 30–16, 24–29, 28–24
Pts: Vyaltsev 18; Rebs: Green, Vyaltsev 5 Asts: Koponen 8		Pts: Simmons 20; Rebs: Simmons 5 Asts: Ilievski 7

Basketball Center, Khimki
Attendance: 1,000
Referees: Olegs Latisevs (LAT), Sasa Maricic (SRB), Ingus Baumanis (LAT)

29 January 2014
20:30 CET

Boxscore

Montepaschi Siena (Italy)	92–73	(Israel) Maccabi Haifa
Scoring by quarter: 28–17, 19–12, 16–19, 29–25
Pts: Janning 34; Rebs: Janning, Ress 5 Asts: Haynes 6		Pts: Roth 18; Rebs: Randle 8 Asts: three players 3

Palaestra, Siena
Attendance: 2,115
Referees: Sreten Radovic (CRO), Francisco Araña (ESP), Regis Bardera (FRA)

=== Game 5 ===
12 February 2014
16:30 CET

Boxscore

Khimki (Russia)	85–73	(Italy) Montepaschi Siena
Scoring by quarter: 18-13, 22-17, 19-28, 26-15
Pts: Augustine 18; Rebs: Augustine 8 Asts: Popović 9		Pts: Nelson 18; Rebs: Nelson 7 Asts: Carter, Green 4

Basketball Center, Khimki
Attendance: 2,000
Referees: Matej Boltauzer (SLO), Sergiy Chebyshev (UKR), Saso Petek (SLO)

12 February 2014
18:30 CET

Boxscore

ČEZ Nymburk (Czech Republic)	68–53	(Israel) Maccabi Haifa
Scoring by quarter: 11-10, 10-22, 27-19, 20-2
Pts: Simmons 16; Rebs: Mahalbašić 11; Asts: Ilievski 8		Pts: Yivzori 13; Rebs: Kokia 7 Asts: Roth 6

Sportovní Centrum, Nymburk
Attendance: 510
Referees: Paolo taurino (ITA), Murat Biricik (TUR), Oscar Perea (ESP)

=== Game 6 ===
19 February 2014
19:00 CET

Boxscore

Maccabi Haifa (Israel)	66–86	(Russia) Khimki
Scoring by quarter: 18-34, 10-22, 19-14, 19-16
Pts: Yivzori 19; Rebs: Yivzori 7 Asts: Smith 6		Pts: Koponen 19; Rebs: Lončar 7 Asts: Popović 7

Romema Arena, Haifa
Attendance: 2,000
Referees: Rustu Nuran (TUR), Gianluca Mattioli (ITA), Tomislav Hordov (CRO)

19 February 2014
20:30 CET

Boxscore

Montepaschi Siena (Italy)	86–84	(Czech Republic) ČEZ Nymburk
Scoring by quarter: 21-17, 26-23, 22-17, 17-27
Pts: Green 24; Rebs: Nelson, Ornter 5 Asts: Haynes 7		Pts: Rančík 20; Rebs: Rančík 6 Asts: Simmons 4

Palaestra, Siena
Attendance: 1,844
Referees: Miguel Perez Perez (ESP), Igor Dragojević (MNE), Miloš Koljenšić (MNE)
