= 2012–13 Basketball Bundesliga =

Basketball Bundesliga 2012–13
- League: Basketball Bundesliga
- Sport: Basketball
- Duration: October, 2011 – April, 2013
- TV partner: Sport1

Regular season
- Top seed: Brose Baskets
- Season MVP: (United States) John Bryant (ratiopharm Ulm)
- Top scorer: (United States) Davin White (Phoenix Hagen)

Finals
- Champions: Brose Baskets
- Runners-up: EWE Baskets Oldenburg
- Finals MVP: (Germany) Anton Gavel (Brose Baskets)

BBL seasons
- ← 2011–12 2013–14 →

The Basketball Bundesliga 2012–13 was the 47th season of this championship. The regular season started on 3 October 2012 and ended on 27 April 2013, after 34 rounds. Brose Baskets from Bamberg won its 6th German championship and its 4th straight title. Runner-up was EWE Baskets Oldenburg.

== Team information ==
Team	City	Arena	Capacity
Brose Baskets (CH, C)	Bamberg	Stechert Arena	6,800
BBC Bayreuth	Bayreuth	Oberfrankenhalle	4,000
Alba Berlin	Berlin	O_{2} World Berlin	14,500
Telekom Baskets Bonn	Bonn	Telekom Dome	6,000
New Yorker Phantoms Braunschweig	Braunschweig	Volkswagen Halle	6,100
Eisbären Bremerhaven	Bremerhaven	Bremerhaven Stadthalle	4,050
Fraport Skyliners	Frankfurt	Fraport Arena	5,002
LTi Gießen 46ers	Gießen	Sporthalle Gießen-Ost	4,003
Phoenix Hagen	Hagen	Enervie Arena	3,402
Neckar-Riesen Ludwigsburg	Ludwigsburg	MHPArena	5,300
Bayern Munich	Munich	Audi Dome	6,700
EWE Baskets Oldenburg	Oldenburg	Große EWE Arena	6,069
Artland Dragons	Quakenbrück	Artland-Arena	3,000
TBB Trier	Trier	Arena Trier	5,900
Walter Tigers Tübingen	Tübingen	Paul Horn-Arena	3,132
ratiopharm ulm	Ulm	Ratiopharm Arena	6,000
Mitteldeutscher BC	Weißenfels	Stadthalle Weißenfels	3,000
s.Oliver Baskets	Würzburg	s.Oliver Arena	3,140

== Standings ==
Pos	Team	Pld	W	L	PF	PA	PD	Qualification or relegation
1	Brose Baskets	34	26	8	2915	2536	+379	Playoffs
2	EWE Baskets Oldenburg	34	25	9	2670	2432	+238	Playoffs
3	ratiopharm Ulm	34	24	10	2888	2642	+246	Playoffs
4	Bayern Munich	34	21	13	2823	2555	+268	Playoffs
5	Alba Berlin	34	20	14	2689	2558	+131	Playoffs
6	Artland Dragons	34	20	14	2635	2614	+21	Playoffs
7	Telekom Baskets Bonn	34	18	16	2779	2766	+13	Playoffs
8	Phoenix Hagen	34	18	16	2955	3057	−102	Playoffs
9	S.Oliver Baskets	34	17	17	2430	2395	+35	
10	Tigers Tübingen	34	16	18	2654	2728	−74	
11	Eisbären Bremerhaven	34	15	19	2697	2732	−35	
12	TBB Trier	34	15	19	2567	2584	−17	
13	New Yorker Phantoms Braunschweig	34	14	20	2560	2628	−68	
14	Skyliners Frankfurt	34	14	20	2433	2426	+7	
15	BBC Bayreuth	34	14	20	2530	2642	−112	
16	Mitteldeutscher BC	34	13	21	2530	2651	−121	
17	EnBW Ludwigsburg	34	12	22	2546	2663	−117	Relegation to Pro A
18	LTi Gießen 46ers	34	4	30	2339	3031	−692	Relegation to Pro A

- The league deducted a total of six points from Gießen over the course of the season as a result of the team's insolvency.

== Playoffs ==
=== Bracket ===
Quarterfinals
1	Brose Baskets	3
8	Phoenix Hagen	1
4	Bayern Munich	3
5	Alba Berlin	0
3	ratiopharm Ulm	3
6	Artland Dragons	0
2	EWE Baskets Oldenburg	3
7	Telekom Baskets Bonn	2

Semifinals
1	Brose Baskets	3
4	Bayern Munich	2
3	ratiopharm Ulm	2
2	EWE Baskets Oldenburg	3

Finals
1	Brose Baskets	3
2	EWE Baskets Oldenburg	0

=== Quarterfinals ===
==== Brose Baskets vs. Phoenix Hagen ====
5 May 2013
19:30

Boxscore

Brose Baskets 99, Phoenix Hagen 74
Scoring by quarter: 30–14, 18–29, 14–21, 37–10
Pts: Sharrod Ford 18; Rebs: Alex Renfroe 7 Asts: Alex Renfroe 7	Pts: David Bell 17; Rebs: Dino Gregory 11; Asts: Larry Gordon 5

Stechert Arena, Bamberg
Attendance: 6,800
Referees: Boris Schmidt, Oliver Krause, Anne Panther

9 May 2013
13:05

Boxscore

Phoenix Hagen 95, Brose Baskets 89
Scoring by quarter: 23–20, 23–31, 27–15, 22–23
Pts: Adam Hess 28; Rebs: Hess, Gregory 7 each Asts: Bell, White 5 each	Pts: Anton Gavel 21; Rebs: Sharrod Ford 11; Asts: Alex Renfroe 5

Enervie Arena, Hagen
Attendance: 3,145
Referees: Moritz Reiter, Konstantin Simonow, Clemens Fritz

12 May 2013
19:30

Boxscore

Brose Baskets 104, Phoenix Hagen 94
Scoring by quarter: 27–27, 34–28, 31–16, 12–23
Pts: Sharrod Ford 23; Rebs: Boštjan Nachbar 8 Asts: Anton Gavel 6	Pts: Davin White 21; Rebs: four players 6 each Asts: David Bell 5

Stechert Arena, Bamberg
Attendance: 6,800
Referees: Moritz Reiter, Toni Rodriguez Soriano, Konstantin Simonow

15 May 2013
20:20

Boxscore

Phoenix Hagen 75, Brose Baskets 92
Scoring by quarter: 11–34, 26–20, 22–23, 16–15
Pts: Bell, White 21 each Rebs: Dino Gregory 9 Asts: Hess, White 2 each	Pts: Sharrod Ford 23; Rebs: Maik Zirbes 7 Asts: three players 4 each
Bamberg wins series 3–1

Enervie Arena, Hagen
Attendance: 3,145
Referees: Robert Lottermoser, Oliver Krause, Clemens Fritz

==== EWE Baskets Oldenburg vs. Telekom Baskets Bonn ====
5 May 2013
18:00

Boxscore

EWE Baskets Oldenburg 78, Telekom Baskets Bonn 66
Scoring by quarter: 22–16, 18–15, 15–16, 23–19
Pts: Rickey Paulding 21; Rebs: Adam Chubb 9 Asts: Dru Joyce 4	Pts: Jamel McLean 22; Rebs: Jamel McLean 11; Asts: three players 2 each

Große EWE Arena, Oldenburg
Attendance: 5,260
Referees: Martin Matip, Steffen Neubecker, Andreas Schreiner

9 May 2013
17:00

Boxscore

Telekom Baskets Bonn 88, EWE Baskets Oldenburg 80
Scoring by quarter: 27–12, 22–22, 23–23, 16–23
Pts: Kyle Weems 15; Rebs: Jamel McLean 7 Asts: Jared Jordan 10	Pts: Robin Smeulders 19; Rebs: Robin Smeulders 9 Asts: Kramer, Joyce 3

Telekom Dome, Bonn
Attendance: 6,000
Referees: Boris Schmidt, Christof Madinger, Enrico Streit

11 May 2013
18:00

Boxscore

EWE Baskets Oldenburg 97, Telekom Baskets Bonn 67
Scoring by quarter: 27–10, 14–23, 30–21, 26–13
Pts: Robin Smeulders 19; Rebs: Kramer, Chubb 5 each Asts: Dru Joyce 8	Pts: Jared Jordan 15; Rebs: three players 5 each Asts: Jared Jordan 4

Große EWE Arena, Oldenburg
Attendance: 5,816
Referees: Boris Schmidt, Benjamin Barth, Nesa Kovacevic

15 May 2013
19:30

Boxscore

Telekom Baskets Bonn 88, EWE Baskets Oldenburg 82 (OT)
Scoring by quarter: 27–19, 24–16, 11–10, 11–28, Overtime: 15–9
Pts: Kyle Weems 34; Rebs: Jamel McLean 12; Asts: Jared Jordan 6	Pts: Adam Chubb 19; Rebs: Kramer, Chubb 7 each Asts: three players 2 each

Telekom Dome, Bonn
Attendance: 5,850
Referees: Martin Matip, Markus Hesse, Andreas Schreiner

18 May 2013
21:00

Boxscore

EWE Baskets Oldenburg 89, Telekom Baskets Bonn 80
Scoring by quarter: 20–19, 22–24, 27–15, 20–22
Pts: Chris Kramer 20; Rebs: Chris Kramer 7 Asts: Dru Joyce 6	Pts: Kyle Weems 23; Rebs: Kyle Weems 7 Asts: Jared Jordan 8
Oldenburg wins series 3–2

Große EWE Arena, Oldenburg
Attendance: 5,920
Referees: Robert Lottermoser, Oliver Krause, Christof Madinger

==== ratiopharm Ulm vs. Artland Dragons ====
4 May 2013
19:00

Boxscore

ratiopharm Ulm 83, Artland Dragons 68
Scoring by quarter: 21–13, 24–31, 17–13, 21–11
Pts: Allan Ray 24; Rebs: Theis, Bryant 10 each Asts: Per Günther 6	Pts: Petar Popović 18; Rebs: Anthony King 11; Asts: Anthony King 4

Ratiopharm Arena, Ulm
Attendance: 6,000
Referees: Moritz Reiter, Benjamin Barth, Ralf Brand

8 May 2013
19:30

Boxscore

Artland Dragons 85, ratiopharm Ulm 90
Scoring by quarter: 22–26, 21–15, 16–23, 26–26
Pts: Anthony King 19; Rebs: Bryce Taylor 8 Asts: Branislav Ratkovica 3	Pts: Per Günther 35; Rebs: Per Günther 7 Asts: Per Günther 4

Artland-Arena, Quakenbrück
Attendance: 3,000
Referees: Martin Matip, Oliver Krause, Nesa Kovacevic

11 May 2013
15:05

Boxscore

ratiopharm Ulm 94, Artland Dragons 74
Scoring by quarter: 20–18, 29–19, 27–25, 18–12
Pts: Keaton Nankivil 15; Rebs: John Bryant 14; Asts: three players 3 each	Pts: Bryce Taylor 28; Rebs: Anthony King 10; Asts: Anthony King 4
Ulm wins series 3–0

Ratiopharm Arena, Ulm
Attendance: 6,000
Referees: Robert Lottermoser, Max Kindervater, Anne Panther

==== Bayern Munich vs. Alba Berlin ====
4 May 2013
17:05

Boxscore

Bayern Munich 88, Alba Berlin 67
Scoring by quarter: 23–18, 21–21, 34–15, 10–13
Pts: Robin Benzing 16; Rebs: Chevon Troutman 6 Asts: Tyrese Rice 5	Pts: Nihad Đedović 13; Rebs: Thompson, Miralles 5 each Asts: Heiko Schaffartzik 5

Audi Dome, Munich
Attendance: 6,700
Referees: Robert Lottermoser, Toni Rodriguez Soriano, Clemens Fritz

8 May 2013
19:30

Boxscore

Alba Berlin 73, Bayern Munich 79
Scoring by quarter: 17–21, 17–10, 18–27, 21–21
Pts: Derrick Byars 18; Rebs: Deon Thompson 7 Asts: three players 3	Pts: Tyrese Rice 21; Rebs: Robin Benzing 11; Asts: Steffen Hamann 3

O_{2} World Berlin, Berlin
Attendance: 12,110
Referees: Boris Schmidt, Markus Hesse, Steffen Neubecker

12 May 2013
14:00

Boxscore

Bayern Munich 89, Alba Berlin 83
Scoring by quarter: 25–13, 19–15, 17–17, 28–38
Pts: Tyrese Rice 20; Rebs: Homan, Troutman 7 each Asts: Steffen Hamann 5	Pts: Heiko Schaffartzik 17; Rebs: Miralles, Morley 6 each Asts: Schaffartzik, Byars 3 each
Munich wins series 3–0

Audi Dome, Munich
Attendance: 6,700
Referees: Martin Matip, Oliver Krause, Christof Madinger

=== Semifinals ===
==== Brose Baskets vs. Bayern Munich ====
22 May 2013
20:05

Boxscore

Brose Baskets 85, Bayern Munich 98
Scoring by quarter: 28–20, 10–18, 22–23, 25–37
Pts: Boštjan Nachbar 22; Rebs: Maik Zirbes 7 Asts: John Goldsberry 7	Pts: Tyrese Rice 25; Rebs: Lawrence Roberts 9 Asts: Steffen Hamann 4

Stechert Arena, Bamberg
Attendance: 6,800
Referees: Robert Lottermoser, Martin Matip, Christof Madinger

26 May 2013
19:05

Boxscore

Bayern Munich 83, Brose Baskets 93
Scoring by quarter: 21–23, 19–25, 17–17, 26–28
Pts: Lawrence Roberts 16; Rebs: Lawrence Roberts 7 Asts: Yotam Halperin 6	Pts: Anton Gavel 17; Rebs: Alex Renfroe 7 Asts: Alex Renfroe 7

Audi Dome, Munich
Attendance: 6,700
Referees: Boris Schmidt, Moritz Reiter, Markus Hesse

30 May 2013
16:05

Boxscore

Brose Baskets 98, Bayern Munich 79
Scoring by quarter: 20–21, 32–31, 23–21, 23–6
Pts: Casey Jacobsen 24; Rebs: Sharrod Ford 7 Asts: Alex Renfroe 7	Pts: Lawrence Roberts 16; Rebs: Lawrence Roberts 7 Asts: Tyrese Rice 8

Stechert Arena, Bamberg
Attendance: 6,800
Referees: Robert Lottermoser, Moritz Reiter, Christof Madinger

2 June 2013
18:30

Boxscore

Bayern Munich 80, Brose Baskets 71
Scoring by quarter: 28–17, 15–19, 14–22, 23–13
Pts: Tyrese Rice 17; Rebs: Jared Homan 9 Asts: Brandon Thomas 5	Pts: Sharrod Ford 14; Rebs: Nachbar, Goldsberry 6 each Asts: John Goldsberry 7

Audi Dome, Munich
Attendance: 6,700
Referees: Boris Schmidt, Oliver Krause, Toni Rodriguez Soriano

6 June 2013
20:30

Boxscore

Brose Baskets 85, Bayern Munich 66
Scoring by quarter: 19–21, 21–19, 24–13, 21–13
Pts: Anton Gavel 18; Rebs: Boštjan Nachbar 7 Asts: Alex Renfroe 5	Pts: Tyrese Rice 16; Rebs: Lawrence Roberts 9 Asts: Yotam Halperin 4
Bamberg wins series 3–2

Stechert Arena, Bamberg
Attendance: 6,800
Referees: Robert Lottermoser, Boris Schmidt, Clemens Fritz

==== EWE Baskets Oldenburg vs. ratiopharm Ulm ====
21 May 2013
20:00

Boxscore

EWE Baskets Oldenburg 84, ratiopharm Ulm 86 (OT)
Scoring by quarter: 16–10, 19–24, 24–22, 20–23, Overtime: 5–7
Pts: Julius Jenkins 21; Rebs: Burrell, Jenkins 6 each Asts: Dru Joyce 5	Pts: John Bryant 24; Rebs: John Bryant 12; Asts: Per Günther 4

Große EWE Arena, Oldenburg
Attendance: 4,621
Referees: Boris Schmidt, Andreas Schreiner, Steffen Neubecker

25 May 2013
17:20

Boxscore

ratiopharm Ulm 60, EWE Baskets Oldenburg 72
Scoring by quarter: 5–20, 19–19, 16–13, 20–20
Pts: Steven Michael Esterkamp 13; Rebs: John Bryant 7 each Asts: Jönke, Jeter 2 each	Pts: Julius Jenkins 21; Rebs: Kramer, Chubb 5 each Asts: Chris Kramer 7

Ratiopharm Arena, Ulm
Attendance: 6,000
Referees: Martin Matip, Oliver Krause, Konstantin Simonow

29 May 2013
20:15

Boxscore

EWE Baskets Oldenburg 65, ratiopharm Ulm 59
Scoring by quarter: 22–20, 17–16, 4–16, 22–7
Pts: Julius Jenkins 17; Rebs: Konrad Wysocki 7 Asts: Dru Joyce 4	Pts: John Bryant 18; Rebs: John Bryant 11; Asts: Keaton Nankivil 3

Große EWE Arena, Oldenburg
Attendance: 6,000
Referees: Boris Schmidt, Toni Rodriguez Soriano, Benjamin Barth

1 June 2013
17:30

Boxscore

ratiopharm Ulm 81, EWE Baskets Oldenburg 79
Scoring by quarter: 19–22, 28–25, 23–15, 11–17
Pts: Keaton Nankivil 15; Rebs: John Bryant 10; Asts: Lance Jeter 7	Pts: Julius Jenkins 29; Rebs: Adam Chubb 6 Asts: Chris Kramer 4

Ratiopharm Arena, Ulm
Attendance: 6,000
Referees: Robert Lottermoser, Moritz Reiter, Christof Madinger

6 June 2013
20:00

Boxscore

EWE Baskets Oldenburg 80, ratiopharm Ulm 75
Scoring by quarter: 22–14, 18–19, 14–22, 26–20
Pts: Julius Jenkins 27; Rebs: Konrad Wysocki 9 Asts: Dru Joyce 6	Pts: Steven Michael Esterkamp 24; Rebs: John Bryant 13; Asts: John Bryant 4
Oldenburg wins series 3–2

Große EWE Arena, Oldenburg
Attendance: 6,000
Referees: Martin Matip, Toni Rodriguez Soriano, Oliver Krause

=== Final ===
==== Brose Baskets vs. EWE Baskets Oldenburg ====
9 June 2013
14:35

Boxscore

Brose Baskets 65, EWE Baskets Oldenburg 63
Scoring by quarter: 11–14, 22–19, 17–16, 15–14
Pts: Anton Gavel 14; Rebs: Ford, Jacobsen 6 Asts: Alex Renfroe 5	Pts: Julius Jenkins 15; Rebs: Ronald Burrell 10; Asts: Dru Joyce 3

Stechert Arena, Bamberg
Attendance: 6,800
Referees: Robert Lottermoser, Moritz Reiter, Oliver Krause

12 June 2013
20:15

Boxscore

EWE Baskets Oldenburg 61, Brose Baskets 63
Scoring by quarter: 24–16, 16–10, 4–16, 17–21
Pts: Ronald Burrell 13; Rebs: Adam Chubb 12; Asts: Joyce, Jenkins 4	Pts: Sharrod Ford 15; Rebs: Sharrod Ford 14; Asts: Alex Renfroe 4

Große EWE Arena, Oldenburg
Attendance: 3,148
Referees: Boris Schmidt, Toni Rodriguez Soriano, Christof Madinger

16 June 2013
16:05

Boxscore

Brose Baskets 91, EWE Baskets Oldenburg 88 (OT)
Scoring by quarter: 13–17, 19–20, 19–16, 23–21, Overtime: 17–14
Pts: Boštjan Nachbar 20; Rebs: Jacobsen, Zirbes 7 each Asts: John Goldsberry 5	Pts: three players 16 each Rebs: Chris Kramer 10; Asts: Dru Joyce 5
Bamberg wins series 3–0

Stechert Arena, Bamberg
Attendance: 6,800
Referees: Robert Lottermoser, Martin Matip, Clemens Fritz

== Statistical leaders ==
=== Points ===
Rank	Name	Team	PPG
1	(United States) Davin White	Phoenix Hagen	17.1
2	(United States) Stanley Burrell	Eisbären Bremerhaven	16.2
3	(Montenegro) Tyrese Rice	Bayern Munich	15.8
4	(United States) David Bell	Phoenix Hagen	15.7
5	(United States) John Bryant	ratiopharm Ulm	15.6

=== Rebounds ===
Rank	Name	Team	RPG
1	(United States) John Bryant	ratiopharm Ulm	10.1
2	(United States) Dwyane Anderson	s.Oliver Baskets	7.2
3	(Bosnia and Herzegovina) Elvir Ovcina	LTi Gießen 46ers	7.1
4	(United States) Adam Chubb	EWE Baskets Oldenburg	6.8
5	(United States) Nate Linhart	TBB Trier	6.5

=== Assists ===
Rank	Name	Team	APG
1	(United States) Jared Jordan	Telekom Baskets Bonn	7.6
2	(United States) Alex Renfroe	Brose Baskets	4.7
3	(Montenegro) Tyrese Rice	Bayern Munich	4.4
4	(United States) Stanley Burrell	Eisbären Bremerhaven	4.3
5	(Puerto Rico) Kevin Hamilton	BBC Bayreuth	4.3

== Awards ==
- Most Valuable Player: (United States) John Bryant (Ratiopharm Ulm)
- Finals MVP: (Germany) Anton Gavel (Brose Baskets)
