= VTB United League records =

This article contains records of the VTB United League since its establishment in 2008.

== Individual records ==
=== Game ===
- Most minutes in a game
  - 49:58 – David McClure, Neptunas (against Enisey) – December 13, 2012
- Most points in a game
  - 49 – Stevan Jelovac, Nizhny Novgorod (against Kalev) – February 15, 2018
- Most points in a half
  - 28 – Ty Abbott, Kalev (against Nizhny Novgorod) – October 20, 2013
- Most points in a quarter
  - 26 – Kasey Shepherd, Nizhny Novgorod (against Khimki) – September 23, 2020
- Most points in an overtime period
  - 13 – Scott Machado, Kalev (against Krasnye Krylia) – February 11, 2015
- Most field goals made in a game
  - 16 – Maciej Lampe, UNICS (against Honka) – March 16, 2011
  - 16 – Cory Higgins, Triumph (against Azovmash) – November 28, 2013
- Most field goals attempted in a game
  - 31 – Alexey Shved, Khimki (against CSKA) – March 4, 2019
- Most field goals missed in a game
  - 21 – Alexey Shved, Khimki (against CSKA) – March 4, 2019
- Most field goals made in a game, no misses
  - 12 – James Augustine, Khimki (against CSKA) – January 26, 2014
- Most 3-point field goals made in a game
  - 12 – Egor Vyaltsev, Khimki (against Astana) – February 14, 2016
- Most 3-point field goals attempted in a game
  - 24 – Ronald Clark, Bisons (against Avtodor) – April 10, 2016
- Most 3-point field goals made in a half
  - 7 – Egor Vyaltsev, Khimki (against Astana) – February 14, 2016
- Most 3-point field goals made in a quarter
  - 6 – Roope Ahonen, Bisons (against Krasnye Krylia) – December 15, 2014
  - 6 – Egor Vyaltsev, Khimki (against Astana) – February 14, 2016
- Most 3-point field goals made in a game, no misses
  - 6 – Jānis Blūms, Lietuvos Rytas (against Azovmash) – March 24, 2013
  - 6 – Sonny Weems, CSKA (against Tsmoki-Minsk) – December 23, 2014
- Most 3-point field goals attempted in a game, none made
  - 11 – Jānis Timma, Khimki (against Zielona Góra) – September 25, 2019
- Most free throws made in a game
  - 19 – Michał Ignerski, Krasnye Krylia (against Enisey) – May 4, 2014
- Most free throws attempted in a game
  - 22 – Michał Ignerski, Krasnye Krylia (against Enisey) – May 4, 2014
- Most free throws made in a half
  - 15 – Michał Ignerski, Krasnye Krylia (against Enisey) – May 4, 2014
- Most free throws made in a quarter
  - 10 – Michał Ignerski, Krasnye Krylia (against Enisey) – May 4, 2014
- Most free throws attempted in a half
  - 18 – Michał Ignerski, Krasnye Krylia (against Enisey) – May 4, 2014
- Most free throws attempted in a quarter
  - 13 – Michał Ignerski, Krasnye Krylia (against Enisey) – May 4, 2014
- Most free throws made in a game without a miss
  - 13 – Malcolm Delaney, Lokomotiv-Kuban (against Nizhny Novgorod) – March 13, 2016
- Most rebounds in a game
  - 25 – Shawn King, Kalev (against Tsmoki-Minsk) – April 24, 2016
- Most rebounds in a half
  - 15 – Shawn King, Tsmoki-Minsk (against Honka) – January 28, 2011
  - 15 – Shawn King, Kalev (against Tsmoki-Minsk) – April 24, 2016
- Most rebounds in a quarter
  - 11 – Shawn King, Tsmoki-Minsk (against Honka) – January 28, 2011
- Most defensive rebounds in a game
  - 17 – Donatas Motiejūnas, Prokom (against Nymburk) – December 4, 2011
  - 17 – Josh Harrellson, VEF (against Avtodor) – April 16, 2016
- Most offensive rebounds in a game
  - 11 – Vitautas Sarakauskas, Neptunas (against Krasnye Krylia) – February 14, 2014
- Most assists in a game
  - 23 – D. J. Cooper, Enisey (against Astana) – January 24, 2015
- Most assists in a half
  - 13 – D. J. Cooper, Enisey (against VEF) – October 9, 2014
  - 13 – D. J. Cooper, Enisey (against Astana) – January 24, 2015
- Most assists in a quarter
  - 10 – D. J. Cooper, Enisey (against Astana) – January 24, 2015
- Most steals in a game
  - 8 – DeAndre Kane, Nizhny Novgorod (against Zenit) – November 13, 2016
- Most steals in a half
  - 6 – Tyler Honeycutt, Khimki (against Avtodor) – October 6, 2014
- Most steals in a quarter
  - 5 – John Prince, Turów (against Spartak) – January 12, 2014
- Most blocks in a game
  - 7 – Bamba Fall, Kalev (against Azovmash) – December 2, 2012
  - 7 – Olaseni Lawal, Astana (against Azovmash) – February 2, 2014
- Most blocks in a half
  - 5 – Kervin Bristol, Krasnye Krylia (against Tsmoki-Minsk) – October 14, 2014
- Most blocks in a quarter
  - 4 – Mirza Begić, Žalgiris (against VEF) – October 31, 2010
  - 4 – Semen Antonov, Nizhny Novgorod (against Spartak) – May 2, 2013
- Most received blocks in a game
  - 5 – Bamba Fall, Kalev (against Lokomotiv-Kuban) – October 5, 2013
  - 5 – Malcolm Delaney, Lokomotiv-Kuban (against Nymburk) – October 7, 2015
  - 5 – Andre Jones Jr., VITA (against CSKA) – January 24, 2016
- Most turnovers in a game
  - 9 – Nemanja Protić, Nizhny Novgorod (against VEF) – November 12, 2011
  - 9 – Aaron Miles, Krasnye Krylia (against Khimki) – February 4, 2012
  - 9 – Nick Calathes, Lokomotiv-Kuban (against Žalgiris) – October 6, 2012
  - 9 – Scottie Reynolds, VEF (against Krasnye Krylia) – November 3, 2014
  - 9 – Scott Machado, Kalev (against Lokomotiv-Kuban) – January 18, 2015
  - 9 – Victor Zaryazhko, Krasnye Krylia (against Kalev) – February 11, 2015
- Most received personal fouls in a game
  - 14 – Alexey Shved, Khimki (against CSKA) – June 10, 2018
- Quickest disqualification
  - 5:28 – Uladzimir Krysevich, Minsk-2006 (against CSKA) – January 21, 2012

=== Season ===
- Most games played
  - 42 – Quino Colom (UNICS, 2015–16)
- Most minutes per game average
  - 36:34 – Courtney Fortson (Avtodor, 2014–15)
- Most minutes
  - 1278:34 – Keith Langford (UNICS, 2015–16)
- Highest points per game average
  - 23.27 – Nicolas Minnerath (Avtodor, 2016–17)
- Most points
  - 851 – Keith Langford (UNICS, 2015–16)
- Most field goals made
  - 306 – Keith Langford (UNICS, 2015–16)
- Most field goals attempted
  - 627 – Keith Langford (UNICS, 2015–16)
- Most field goals missed
  - 321 – Keith Langford (UNICS, 2015–16)
- Highest field goal percentage
  - 66.9% – Marco Killingsworth (Donetsk, 2013–14)
- Most free throws made
  - 219 – Stevan Jelovac (Nizhny Novgorod, 2017–18)
- Most free throws attempted
  - 243 – Stevan Jelovac (Nizhny Novgorod, 2017–18)
- Highest free throw percentage
  - 97.4% – Branko Mirković (Tsmoki-Minsk, 2015–16)
- Most 3-point field goals made
  - 103 – Alexey Shved (Khimki, 2016–17)
- Most 3-point field goals attempted
  - 268 – Alexey Shved (Khimki, 2016–17)
- Highest 3-point field goal percentage
  - 56.2% – Petr Gubanov (Nizhny Novgorod, 2016–17)
- Highest rebounds per game average
  - 11.3 – Frank Elegar (Kalev, 2014–15)
- Most rebounds
  - 275 – Latavious Williams (UNICS, 2015–16)
- Most defensive rebounds
  - 218 – Trey Thompkins (Nizhny Novgorod, 2014–15)
- Most offensive rebounds
  - 106 – Josh Boone (Khimki, 2015–16)
- Highest assists per game average
  - 9.20 – D. J. Cooper (Enisey, 2014–15)
- Most assists
  - 276 – D. J. Cooper (Enisey, 2014–15)
- Highest steals per game average
  - 3.00 – Tywain McKee (Triumph, 2012–13)
- Most steals
  - 64 – Howard Sant-Roos (ČEZ Nymburk, 2015–16)
- Highest blocks per game average
  - 2.38 – Bamba Fall (Kalev, 2012–13)
- Most blocks
  - 67 – Artsiom Parakhouski (Nizhny Novgorod, 2014–15)
- Highest turnovers per game average
  - 4.42 – Jerry Johnson (Astana, 2015–16)
- Most turnovers
  - 128 – Scott Machado (Kalev, 2014–15)
- Most personal fouls
  - 125 – Kaspars Bērziņš (Nizhny Novgorod, Zenit, 2015–16)
- Most double-doubles
  - 10 – five players

=== Career ===
- Most games
  - 252 – Vitaly Fridzon
- Most minutes
  - 5490:41 – Sergei Monia
- Most points
  - 2677 – Alexey Shved
- Most consecutive 30+ point games
  - 2 – Cory Higgins (November 28, 2013 – December 7, 2013)
- Most consecutive 20+ point games
  - 6 – Randy Culpepper (December 8, 2013 – November 30, 2014)
  - 6 – Elmedin Kikanovic (April 5, 2015 – April 26, 2015)
- Most consecutive 10+ point games
  - 28 – Randy Culpepper (October 14, 2013 – March 17, 2015)
- Most field goals made
  - 856 – Alexey Shved
- Most field goals attempted
  - 1950 – Alexey Shved
- Most free throws made
  - 600 – Alexey Shved
- Most free throws attempted
  - 742 – Alexey Shved
- Most 3-point field goals made
  - 365 – Alexey Shved
- Most 3-point field goals attempted
  - 1031 – Alexey Shved
- Most rebounds
  - 998 – Andrey Vorontsevich
- Most defensive rebounds
  - 724 – Sergei Monia
- Most offensive rebounds
  - 316 – Evgeny Valiev
- Most assists
  - 776 – Miloš Teodosić
- Most steals
  - 251 – Vitaly Fridzon
- Most blocks
  - 209 – Sergei Monia
- Most received blocks
  - 67 – Nando de Colo, Tyrese Rice
- Most personal fouls
  - 602 – Semen Antonov
- Most received personal fouls
  - 638 – Nando de Colo
- Double-doubles
  - 25 – Frank Elegar
- Championships
  - 10 – Andrey Vorontsevich, Nikita Kurbanov
  - 8 - Victor Khryapa

== Team records ==
=== Game ===
- Most points in a game
  - 135 – Avtodor (against Bisons) – April 10, 2016
- Most points in a half
  - 71 – Avtodor (against Astana) – December 6, 2015
- Most points in a quarter
  - 41 – Lokomotiv-Kuban (against VITA) – February 21, 2016
- Most points in an overtime period
  - 22 – Astana (against Avtodor) – December 23, 2018
- Most combined points in a game
  - 227 – Avtodor (109) – Khimki (118) – February 15, 2017
- Most combined points in a half
  - 116 – Avtodor (55) – Khimki (61) – February 15, 2017
- Most combined points in a quarter
  - 65 – Lietuvos Rytas (38) – Tsmoki-Minsk (27) – March 16, 2012
- Most combined points in an overtime period
  - 36 – Neptunas (20) – Tsmoki-Minsk (16) – October 31, 2012
- Fewest points in a game
  - 37 – Azovmash (against CSKA) – March 10, 2012
- Fewest points in a half
  - 12 – Azovmash (against CSKA) – January 19, 2014
- Fewest points in a quarter
  - 2 – Azovmash (against CSKA) – January 19, 2014
- Fewest points in an overtime period
  - 2 – Triumph (against Žalgiris) – October 14, 2012
- Fewest combined points in a game
  - 95 – Spartak (45) – Prokom (50) – March 10, 2012
- Fewest combined points in a half
  - 37 – UNICS (18) – Spartak (19) – October 15, 2012
- Fewest combined points in a quarter
  - 10 – CSKA (4) – Azovmash (6) – March 10, 2012
- Fewest combined points in an overtime period
  - 8 – Žalgiris (6) – Triumph (2) – October 14, 2012
- Most field goals made in a game
  - 55 – Avtodor (against Bisons) – April 10, 2016
- Most field goals attempted in a game
  - 86 – Krasny Oktyabr (against Nymburk) – November 14, 2015
  - 86 – VITA (against Bisons) – January 11, 2016
- Most field goals missed in a game
  - 60 – Honka (against CSKA) – November 27, 2010
- Most 3-point field goals made in a game
  - 24 – Lokomotiv-Kuban (against VITA) – February 21, 2016
- Most 3-point field goals attempted in a game
  - 50 – Bisons (against Avtodor) – April 10, 2016
- Most free throws made
  - 39 – Enisey (against Nizhny Novgorod) – October 21, 2017
  - 39 – CSKA (against Nizhny Novgorod) – October 13, 2018
- Most free throws attempted
  - 50 – Budivelnyk (against VEF) – March 4, 2012
- Largest margin of victory in a game
  - 63 – Lokomotiv-Kuban (114) – Kalev (51) – October 9, 2014
- Largest margin of victory in an overtime period
  - 17 – Astana (22) – Avtodor (5) – December 23, 2018
- Most rebounds in a game
  - 61 – Tsmoki-Minsk (against Honka) – January 28, 2011
- Most defensive rebounds in a game
  - 47 – Avtodor (against Bisons) – April 10, 2016
- Most offensive rebounds in a game
  - 32 – Kalev (against Avtodor) – December 28, 2014
- Most assists in a game
  - 46 – Khimki (against Astana) – February 14, 2016
- Fewest assists in a game
  - 2 – Nymburk (against Triumph) – October 21, 2012
- Most steals in a game
  - 22 – Triumph (against Nymburk) – October 21, 2012
- Fewest steals in a game
  - 1 – 35 occasions
- Most blocks in a game
  - 16 – CSKA (against VITA) – January 24, 2016
- Fewest blocks in a game
  - 0 –
- Most fouls in a game
  - 38 – Tsmoki-Minsk (against Lokomotiv-Kuban) – March 17, 2018
- Fewest fouls in a game
  - 7 – Žalgiris (against Lokomotiv-Kuban) – May 25, 2013
  - 7 – Bisons (against Krasnye Krylia) – March 29, 2015
- Most turnovers in a game
  - 27 – Tsmoki-Minsk (against CSKA) – January 21, 2012
  - 27 – Nymburk (against Triumph) – October 21, 2012
  - 27 – Tsmoki-Minsk (against Neptunas) – February 10, 2013
  - 27 – Astana (against CSKA) – November 23, 2014
  - 27 – Avtodor (against Astana) – March 26, 2016
- Fewest turnovers in a game
  - 1 – Zenit (against Tsmoki-Minsk) – April 15, 2015
- Largest comeback
  - ?

=== Regular season ===
- Best record
  - 18-0 – Khimki, 2013–14
- Worst record
  - 1-29 – VITA, 2015–16
- Most wins
  - 28 – CSKA, 2015–16
- Most losses
  - 29 – VITA, 2015–16
- Longest winning streak
  - 25 – Khimki (February 18, 2013 – October 19, 2014)
- Most points per game
  - 95.5 – Khimki, 2015–16
- Fewest points per game
  - 61.7 – Kalev, 2009–10
- Highest average point differential
  - +20.9 – CSKA, 2015–16
- Lowest average point differential
  - -28.4 – VITA, 2015–16

=== Playoffs ===
- Best record
  - 9-0 – CSKA, 2014–15, 2016–17, 2018–19

=== Franchise ===
- Most wins in regular season
  - 179 – CSKA
- Most losses in regular season
  - 151 – Tsmoki-Minsk

== Other records ==
- Largest attendance at a game
  - 15,812 – Zalgiris – CSKA – October 28, 2012
- Triple-doubles
  - Victor Khryapa, January 20, 2013, CSKA – VEF; 10 points, 13 rebounds, 10 assists
  - Jeremy Chappell, November 2, 2013, Triumph – Neptunas; 18 points, 10 rebounds, 11 assists
  - Bernard King, March 21, 2014, Krasny Oktyabr – Tsmoki-Minsk; 16 points, 11 rebounds, 11 assists
  - Aaron Miles, May 4, 2014, Krasnye Krylia – Enisey; 13 points, 12 rebounds, 15 assists
  - Scott Machado, February 1, 2015, Kalev – Nizhny Novgorod; 12 points, 10 rebounds, 14 assists
  - Codi Miller-McIntyre, April 1, 2018, Parma – Enisey; 17 points, 11 rebounds, 11 assists
  - Codi Miller-McIntyre, April 29, 2018, Parma – Avtodor; 16 points, 10 rebounds, 16 assists
- Youngest player to play a game
  - 16 years, 76 days – Goga Bitadze (VITA, October 4, 2015)
- Oldest player to play a game
  - 37 years, 299 days – Zakhar Pashutin (UNICS, February 26, 2012)
- Most overtimes
  - 2 – Krasnye Krylia – Budivelnyk, February 15, 2012
  - 2 – Neptunas – Enisey, December 13, 2012
  - 2 – Spartak – Nizhny Novgorod, May 5, 2013
  - 2 – Tsmoki-Minsk – Azovmash, February 16, 2014
  - 2 – Khimki – Lokomotiv-Kuban, December 7, 2015
  - 2 – Enisey – Nymburk, February 8, 2016
  - 2 – Astana – Enisey, November 20, 2016
  - 2 – Avtodor – Astana, January 20, 2018
  - 2 – Nizhny Novgorod – Parma, December 23, 2018
  - 2 – Zenit – VEF, February 14, 2019
