= Evgeny Kolesnikov =

Russian basketball player

Evgeni Kolesnikov
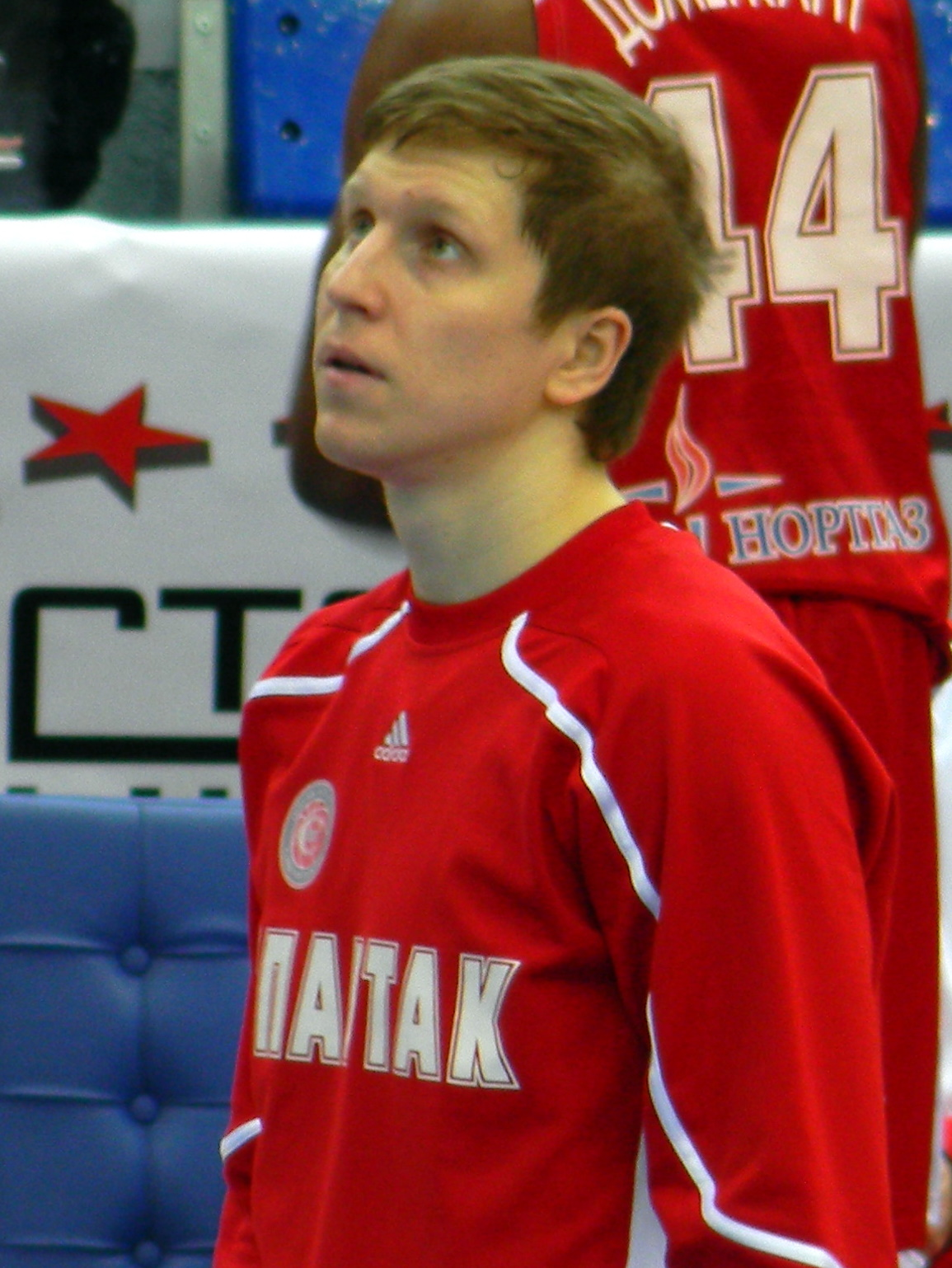

No. 24 – Avtodor Saratov
- Position: Point guard / shooting guard
- League: VTB United League

Personal information
- Born: December 26, 1985 (age 40) Dzhambul, Soviet Union
- Listed height: 6 ft 5 in (1.96 m)
- Listed weight: 210 lb (95 kg)

Career information
- NBA draft: 2007: undrafted
- Playing career: 2002–present

Career history
- 2002–2004: CSKA Moscow
- 2004–2005: CSK VVS Samara
- 2005–2006: Ural Great Perm
- 2006–2007: Spartak Primorje
- 2007–2009: VEF Rīga
- 2009–2011: Spartak St. Petersburg
- 2011–2013: Krasnye Krylya Samara
- 2013–2014: UNICS
- 2014–2015: Enisey
- 2015–2016: Avtodor Saratov
- 2016: Obradoiro CAB
- 2016–2017: Avtodor Saratov
- 2017–2021: UNICS
- 2021–2022: Avtodor Saratov
- 2022: CSKA Moscow
- 2022–present: Avtodor Saratov

Career highlights
- EuroChallenge champion (2013)

Evgeny Sergeyevich Kolesnikov (Russian: Евгений Сергеевич Колесников; born December 26, 1985) is a Russian professional basketball player for Avtodor Saratov of the VTB United League. He is 1.94 m (6 ft 4 ¾ in) in height and he plays as a combo guard. He is also a member of the Russian national basketball team.

== Professional career ==
Kolesnikov played with the PBC CSKA Moscow junior team in Russia between 2002 and 2004. In 2004, he moved to fellow Russian side CSK VVS Samara, where he competed with the club's second team. In 2005, he moved, this time to PBC Ural Great, where he saw action in the 2005-06 ULEB Eurocup.

After one more season in Russia, where he saw little playing time, he moved to Latvian side BK VEF Rīga. Kolesnikov had two highly successful seasons with the squad, leading the team to the 2009 Latvian league title and winning the 2009 Baltic Basketball League Challenge Cup MVP. On the heels of his success in Latvia, Russian side Spartak Saint Petersburg signed Kolesnikov to a two-year deal in 2009. He averaged 7.5 points per league game in his first season with the team and also competed in the ULEB Eurocup 2009–10. He will again compete with the team at the ULEB Eurocup 2010–11.

In July 2014, he signed a one-year deal with Enisey Krasnoyarsk.

Kolesnikov joined UNICS in 2017. He averaged 6 points and 2.7 rebounds per game during the 2019-20 season. On August 18, 2020, he re-signed with the team.

On April 14, 2022, he has signed with CSKA Moscow of the VTB United League.

== Russian national team ==
Kolesnikov is also a member of the senior Russian national basketball team. He competed with the team for the first time at the 2010 FIBA World Championship after previously making appearances with the junior national team.
