= Anton Pushkov =

Russian basketball player (born 1988)

Free agent
- Position: Center

Personal information
- Born: November 22, 1988 (age 37) Surgut, Russian SFSR, Soviet Union
- Listed height: 6 ft 10 in (2.08 m)
- Listed weight: 206 lb (93 kg)

Career information
- NBA draft: 2010: undrafted
- Playing career: 2008–present

Career history
- 2008–2011: Volzhanin-GES Volzhskiy
- 2011–2013: Khimki Moscow
- 2013–2015: Krasnye Krylya
- 2015–2022: Zenit Saint Petersburg

Career highlights
- VTB United League champion (2022)

Anton Pushkov (Russian: Антон Пушков; born November 22, 1988) is a Russian professional basketball player.

== Professional career ==
Pushov began his professional career with Volzhanin-GES Volzhskiy in 2008 and stayed with the team until mid 2010–11 season. Then, he moved to the second team of Khimki Moscow and later joined the main team. With Khimki, he won the 2011–12 Eurocup Basketball championship. He moved to the Krasnye Krylya during the 2012–13 season and won the 2012–13 FIBA EuroChallenge with them.

Pushov signed a contract with Zenit Saint Petersburg in the summer of 2015. In July 2019, he signed a new two-year contract with Zenit. Pushkov signed a two-year extension with the team on July 21, 2021.
