= Karşıyaka Arena =

Sports hall in İzmir, Turkey

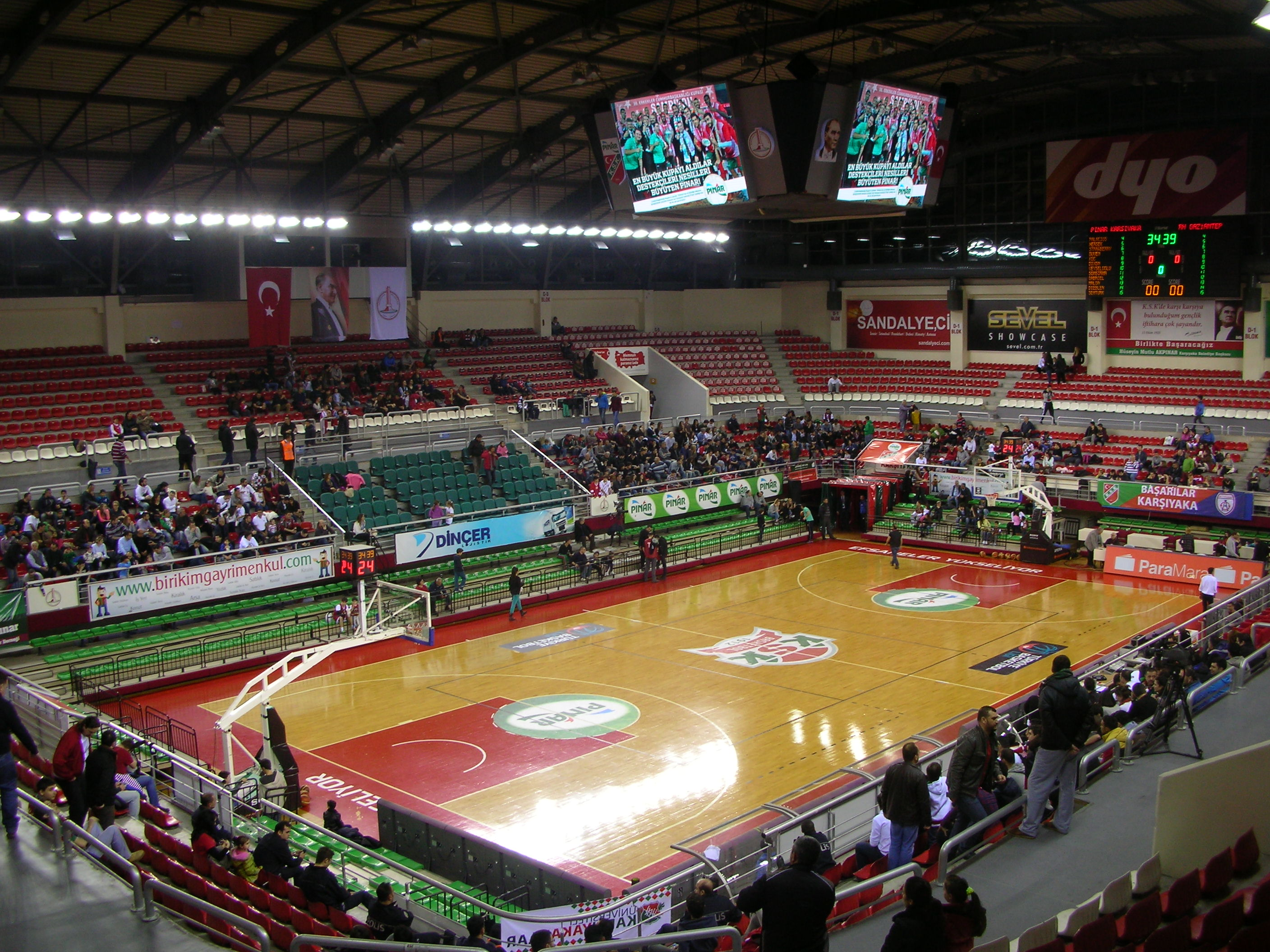
- Interactive map of Karşıyaka Arena
- Location: Karşıyaka, İzmir, Turkey
- Coordinates: 38.47448°N 27.07678°E
- Owner: Karşıyaka Spor Kulübü
- Operator: Karşıyaka Municipality
- Capacity: 5,200 (upper tier only); 6,500 (with lower tier)
- Acreage: 11,650 m^{2} (125,400 ft^{2})

Construction
- Opened: 2005; 21 years ago

Tenants
- Pınar Karşıyaka (basketball), Karşıyaka Women's Volleyball Team (volleyball)

Karşıyaka Arena (also known as Mustafa Kemal Atatürk Karşıyaka Sport Hall) is a multi-purpose indoor arena in İzmir, Turkey. It was opened in 2005. It is owned and run by Karşıyaka SK. The 6,500 seating capacity arena is used mostly to host basketball and volleyball games, as well as concerts and events.

The arena also features a VIP lounge area with seating for 90, an additional practice training hall that seats 500 people, a weight training room, fitness and aerobics facilities, a conference room that holds 100 people, a media room for the press, a medical room, locker room facilities, 20 athlete guesthouses, cafeterias, administrative offices, a sports bar, and 800 parking spaces.

== History ==
Karşıyaka Arena was built for the 2005 Summer Universiade, where it hosted the basketball and volleyball competitions. The arena was used to host the EuroChallenge 2012–13 season's Final Four tournament, where the tournament's home team, Pınar Karşıyaka, lost in the final to Krasnye Krylia.

== See also ==
- List of indoor arenas in Turkey
