= Andre Smith (basketball, born 1985) =

American basketball player

Personal information
- Born: February 21, 1985 (age 41) Saint Paul, Minnesota
- Listed height: 6 ft 8 in (2.03 m)
- Listed weight: 222 lb (101 kg)

Career information
- High school: Como Park (Saint Paul, Minnesota)
- College: ND State College of Science (2003–2005); North Dakota State (2005–2007)
- NBA draft: 2007: undrafted
- Playing career: 2007–2016
- Position: Power forward

Career history
- 2007: Hérens Basket
- 2007–2008: Niigata Albirex
- 2008–2009: Everton Tigers
- 2009–2011: Pınar Karşıyaka
- 2011–2012: Otto Caserta
- 2012–2013: Krasnye Krylia
- 2013–2014: Umana Reyer Venezia
- 2014–2015: Tofaş
- 2015: Incheon Electroland Elephants
- 2016: Byblos Club

Career highlights
- EuroChallenge champion (2013); Russian Cup winner (2013); LBA Top Scorer (2012); BBL Cup winner (2009); BBL Cup Final MVP (2009); BBL Team of the Year (2009); ND State College of Science Athletics Hall of Fame inductee (2017)

Andre Jermaine Smith (born February 21, 1985) is an American former professional basketball player. He played college basketball for ND State College of Science and North Dakota State before playing nine seasons of professional basketball in Europe and Asia between 2007 and 2016.

== High school career ==
Smith attended Como Park Senior High School in Saint Paul, Minnesota, where he was named first-team all-conference and second team all-state while averaging 20 points and 10 rebounds in 2002–03.

== College career ==
As a freshman at ND State College of Science in 2003–04, Smith averaged 12 points and six rebounds per game.

As a sophomore in 2004–05, Smith helped the Wildcats to a 28–7 record and averaged 13.6 points, a team-high 9.7 rebounds, 1.0 blocks and 1.3 steals per game.

In 2005, Smith transferred to North Dakota State University.

As a junior with the Bison in 2005–06, Smith started in all 27 games he played and averaged 13.4 points, 8.0 rebounds, 1.1 assists, 1.0 steals and 1.3 blocks per game.

As a senior in 2006–07, Smith started in all 28 games he played and averaged 17.0 points, 9.1 rebounds, 1.8 assists, 1.6 steals and 1.4 blocks per game.

== Professional career ==
Smith began his professional career with Hérens Basket in Switzerland, averaging 13.0 points, 7.5 rebounds, 1.5 assists and 1.6 steals in eight games to begin the 2007–08 season. In December 2007, he joined Japanese team Niigata Albirex. On February 22, 2008, he had 18 points and 16 rebounds and hit the game-winning basket to lift the team to a 90–89 win over Rizing Fukuoka.

In August 2008, Smith joined the Everton Tigers of the British Basketball League for the 2008–09 season. In January 2009, he helped the Tigers defeat the Plymouth Raiders 103–49 in the BBL Cup final. He was named Most Valuable Player of the final after recording 26 points and 10 rebounds. In 32 games, he averaged 26.5 points, 11.2 rebounds, 1.8 assists and 1.3 steals per game. He finished runner-up league MVP and earned BBL Team of the Year honors.

For the 2009–10 season, Smith joined Turkish team Pınar Karşıyaka. In 32 games, he averaged 15.8 points, 6.8 rebounds and 1.0 steals per game. He returned to Pınar Karşıyaka for the 2010–11 season and averaged 18.8 points, 7.8 rebounds, 1.6 assists and 1.9 steals in 22 league games. He also averaged 17.7 points, 9.0 rebounds, 1.6 assists and 1.3 steals in 12 EuroChallenge games. He was named runner-up for all-star power forward for the 2010–11 FIBA EuroChallenge.

For the 2011–12 season, Smith joined Italian team Otto Caserta. He was the Italian League scoring champion with a league-leading 18.4 points per game.

For the 2012–13 season, Smith joined Russian team Krasnye Krylia. He helped the team win the 2012–13 FIBA EuroChallenge.

For the 2013–14 season, Smith joined Italian team Umana Reyer Venezia. In 29 games, he averaged 17.4 points, 7.2 rebounds and 2.0 assists per game.

For the 2014–15 season, Smith joined Turkish team Tofaş. He left the team in January 2015 after averaging 12.7 points, 5.2 rebounds and 2.1 assists in 13 league games.

Smith started the 2015–16 season with Incheon Electroland Elephants in South Korea, averaging 17.2 points, 8.1 rebounds and 2.3 assists in 10 games between September 12 and October 10. In March 2016, he joined Byblos Club in Lebanon and averaged 16.7 points, 9.6 rebounds and 1.6 assists in 10 games.

On December 3, 2016, Smith announced his retirement.

== Personal life ==
Smith is the son of Ervin and Michelle Smith and has two brothers, Jason and Nick, and two sisters, Sandra and Ashley.

As of 2012, Smith was married.
