= Kervin Bristol =

Haitian-American basketball player

Personal information
- Born: September 4, 1988 (age 38) Port-au-Prince, Haiti
- Listed height: 6 ft 10 in (2.08 m)
- Listed weight: 225 lb (102 kg)

Career information
- High school: Institution Saint-Louis de Gonzague
- College: Broward College (2008–2010); Fordham (2010–2012)
- NBA draft: 2012: undrafted
- Playing career: 2012–2021
- Position: Power forward / center

Career history
- 2012–2013: Istanbulspor
- 2012–2013: Hopsi Polzela
- 2013–2014: Mykolaiv
- 2014–2015: Krasnye Krylia
- 2015: JDA Dijon
- 2015: Nea Kifissia
- 2015–2016: Anwil Włocławek
- 2016: Mugla Ormanspor
- 2016: Nizhny Novgorod
- 2016: Odesa
- 2017: Kataja
- 2017–2018: Budivelnyk
- 2018: Vytautas Prienai–Birštonas
- 2018–2019: London Lions
- 2019–2020: MBC Mykolaiv
- 2020–2021: London Lions

Career highlights
- Slovenian League MVP (2013); Slovenian League rebounding champion (2013); Ukraine League rebounding champion (2014); Ukrainian League Defensive Player of the Year (2014); Ukrainian League Forward of the Year (2014); Ukrainian League Import Player of the Year (2014)

Kervin Bristol (born September 4, 1988) is a Haitian-American former professional basketball player who last played for the London Lions of the British Basketball League (BBL).

== Early years ==
Bristol was born in Port-au-Prince to Marlene Beauvais and Frank Bristol. In Haiti, he played at the Institution Saint-Louis de Gonzague before deciding to move to the United States, enrolling at Broward College in Fort Lauderdale, Florida.

After redshirting his first year, Bristol earned time as a rotation player for the Seahawks, averaging 10.1 points per game 9.6 rebounds and 5.9 blocks per game en route to helping Broward to a Southern Conference title. As a sophomore, Broward averaged 12.4 points per game 10.8 rebounds and 6.3 blocks per game.

As a transfer candidate, Bristol received offers from Southern Miss, Hofstra, Auburn, and Fordham. Bristol ultimately selected to play for the Fordham Rams. Bristol played two years in a reserve role, graduated with a Bachelor's Degree in Finance in 2012, then proceeded to pursue a professional basketball career in Europe.

== Professional ==
Bristol started playing professional basketball for the Istanbulspor of the Turkish Basketball Second League (TB2L). In 19 games he averaged 10.1ppg, 12.2rpg (third in the league) and 1.6bpg in the 2012–13 season.

Bristol then played a season for KD Hopsi Polzela in Slovenia (SKL). In 14 games he averaged 11.4ppg, 10.9rpg (led the league), 1.1apg and 2.4bpg in the 2012–13 season, where he was awarded the MVP.

In the summer of 2013, Bristol tried out for the Huracanes del Atlántico of the Dominican Republic League (LNB), but ultimately did not sign.

Bristol played for the MBC Mykolaiv in Ukraine, where he averaged 12.7ppg, 12.4rpg (led the league) and 2.5bpg in 15 games. He was named All-Ukrainian Superleague Defensive Player of the Year, All-Ukrainian Superleague Import Player of the Year, All-Ukrainian Superleague Forward of the Year.

Bristol has played for the BC Krasnye Krylia in Russia, but was released by the team before the season was over. In 19 games, he recorded 7.4ppg, 9.6rpg (second in the league) and 1.6bpg.

He had short stints with the JDA Dijon Basket of the LNB Pro A (France), and the Nea Kifissia B.C. of Greece (GBL). In the 2015–16 season he played for KK Włocławek of the Polish League (PLK).

On August 21, 2018, Bristol signed with the London Lions of the British league.

On 3 August 2020 the London Lions re-signed Kervin after a season in Ukraine. Kervin was a member of the 2018–19 Lions squad.

=== Records ===
- VTB United League record: Most rebounds in a game (19)
- VTB United League record: Most blocks in a half (5)
- VTB United League record: Highest rebound average (9.63)
