= FIBA EuroChallenge Final Four MVP =

Most valuable player award

The FIBA EuroChallenge Final Four MVP, or FIBA EuroChallenge Finals MVP, was the most valuable player award that was presented to the basketball player who most exhibited exceptional play during the FIBA EuroChallenge's Final Four stage, which was the final stage of Europe's former third-tier level European-wide professional club basketball tournament.

== Winners ==
- Player nationality by national team.

Season	Player	Pos.	Nationality	Team	Ref.
2003–04	Martin Müürsepp	PF	Estonia	(Russia) UNICS Kazan	
2004–05	Kelly McCarty	SF	Russia	(Russia) Dynamo Saint Petersburg	
2005–06	Rudy Fernández	SG	Spain	(Spain) Joventut Badalona	
2006–07	Ariel McDonald	PG	Slovenia	(Spain) Akasvayu Girona	
2007–08	Giedrius Gustas	PG	Lithuania	(Latvia) Barons LMT	
2008–09	Keith Langford	SG	United States	(Italy) Virtus Bologna	
2009–10	Taylor Rochestie	PG	Montenegro	(Germany) BG Göttingen	
2010–11	Goran Ikonić	SG/SF	Bosnia and Herzegovina	(Slovenia) Krka Novo Mesto	
2011–12	Pops Mensah-Bonsu	C	United Kingdom	(Turkey) Beşiktaş	
2012–13	Tre Simmons	SF	United States	(Russia) Krasnye Krylia Samara	
2013–14	Andrea Cinciarini	PG	Italy	(Italy) Grissin Bon Reggio Emilia	
2014–15	Jamal Shuler	SG	United States	(France) JSF Nanterre	
