= 2009–10 FIBA EuroChallenge =

FIBA EuroChallenge
- Season: 2009–10
- Duration: 24 November 2009 – 2 May 2010
- Teams: 32

Finals
- Champions: (Germany) BG Göttingen (1st title)
- Runners-up: (Russia) Krasnye Krylya Samara
- Third place: (France) Chorale Roanne
- Fourth place: (Italy) Scavolini Spar Pesaro
- Final Four MVP: (United States) Taylor Rochestie

Statistical leaders
Points	(Dominican Republic) Luis Flores	18.8
Rebounds	(United States) William Thomas	8.2
Assists	(United States) Dean Oliver	6.2

2009–10 FIBA EuroChallenge was the seventh edition of Europe's third-tier level transnational men's professional club basketball FIBA EuroChallenge Tournament, organized by FIBA Europe.

== Teams ==
Group stage
Country (League)	Teams	Teams (rankings in 2008–09 national championships)		
Russia (Superleague A)	3	Lokomotiv–Kuban (7)	Enisey Krasnoyarsk (8)	Krasnye Krylya Samara (12)
France (LNB Pro A)	3	BCM Gravelines (6)	Elan Chalon (7)	Strasbourg IG (8)
Belgium (Ligue Ethias)	3	Generali Okapi Aalstar (3)	Antwerp Giants (4)	Belgacom Liège (5)
Croatia (A1 Liga)	2	KK Zagreb Croatia Osiguranje (3)	Cedevita Zagreb (6)	
Germany (BBL)	2	BG Göttingen (5)	Artland Dragons (9)	
Ukraine (SuperLeague)	2	Khimik Yuzhny (3)	BC Kyiv (4)	
Cyprus (Division A)	2	Keravnos Strovolou (2)	Proteas EKA AEL (3)	
Italy (Lega A)	1	Scavolini Spar Pesaro (8)		
Turkey (TBL)	1	Banvit BC (12)		
Serbia (KLS)	1	KK FMP Belgrade (4)		
Netherlands (FEB)	1	EiffelTowers Den Bosch (2)		
Estonia (KML)	1	Tartu Rock (2)		
Romania (Division A)	1	CSU Asesoft Ploiesti (1)		
Belarus (Premier League)	1	BC Minsk-2006 (1)		
Losers of Eurocup 2009–10 qualifying rounds
Country (League)	Teams	Teams (rankings in 2008–09 national championships)		
France (LNB PRO A)	1	Chorale Roanne (5)		
Ukraine (SuperLeague)	1	BC Donetsk (2)		
Belgium (Ligue Ethias)	1	Dexia Mons-Hainaut (2)		
Latvia (LBL)	1	VEF Rīga (3)		
Montenegro (Opportunity Liga)	1	KK Budućnost (1)		
Cyprus (Division A)	1	APOEL Nicosia (1)		
Netherlands (FEB)	1	MyGuide Amsterdam (1)		
Austria (Admiral League)	1	WBC Kraftwerk Wels (1)		

== Regular season ==
The Regular Season begins from November 24, 2009.

=== Group A ===
Pos	Team	Pld	W	L	PF	PA	PD	Pts	Qualification	GÖT	BUD	BCM	LOK
1	(Germany) Göttingen	6	4	2	491	434	+57	10	Advance to last 16	—	74–80	81–51	92–71
2	(Montenegro) Budućnost m:tel	6	4	2	435	415	+20	10	Advance to last 16	92–84	—	74–82	61–49
3	(France) BCM Gravelines	6	4	2	421	420	+1	10		64–72	70–59	—	77–68
4	(Russia) Lokomotiv Kuban	6	0	6	386	464	−78	6		76–88	56–69	66–77	—

Source: FIBA Europe

=== Group B ===
Pos	Team	Pld	W	L	PF	PA	PD	Pts	Qualification	APOEL	DBO	SIG	KHI
1	(Cyprus) APOEL	6	4	2	495	456	+39	10	Advance to last 16	—	81–66	85–83	104–71
2	(Netherlands) EiffelTowers Den Bosch	6	4	2	482	474	+8	10	Advance to last 16	82–74	—	85–90	83–68
3	(France) SIG Strasbourg	6	3	3	504	499	+5	9		76–67	70–74	—	97–93
4	(Ukraine) Khimik	6	1	5	496	548	−52	7		78–84	91–92	95–88	—

Source: FIBA Europe

=== Group C ===
Pos	Team	Pld	W	L	PF	PA	PD	Pts	Qualification	KRA	PES	MIN	AMS
1	(Russia) Krasnye Krylia	6	5	1	487	410	+77	11	Advance to last 16	—	70–58	106–68	71–51
2	(Italy) Scavolini Spar Pesaro	6	5	1	470	397	+73	11	Advance to last 16	92–86	—	93–85	66–41
3	(Belarus) Minsk-2006	6	2	4	417	487	−70	8		72–76	49–80	—	67–64
4	(Netherlands) Amsterdam	6	0	6	359	439	−80	6		69–78	66–81	68–76	—

Source: FIBA Europe

=== Group D ===
Pos	Team	Pld	W	L	PF	PA	PD	Pts	Qualification	CHA	AEL	MON	CED
1	(France) Élan Chalon	6	4	2	467	452	+15	10	Advance to last 16	—	81–74	81–62	80–77
2	(Cyprus) Proteas EKA AEL	6	3	3	466	473	−7	9	Advance to last 16	72–69	—	86–68	81–73
3	(Belgium) Dexia Mons-Hainaut	6	3	3	452	454	−2	9		84–67	82–71	—	85–64
4	(Croatia) Cedevita	6	2	4	482	488	−6	8		83–89	100–82	85–71	—

Source: FIBA Europe

=== Group E ===
Pos	Team	Pld	W	L	PF	PA	PD	Pts	Qualification	LÌE	ENI	DON	CSU
1	(Belgium) Belgacom Liège	6	5	1	479	454	+25	11	Advance to last 16	—	73–65	74–79	86–79
2	(Russia) Enisey	6	3	3	470	466	+4	9	Advance to last 16	78–84	—	92–81	74–73
3	(Ukraine) Donetsk	6	2	4	502	516	−14	8		81–89	80–90	—	86–74
4	(Romania) CSU Asesoft Ploiești	6	2	4	470	485	−15	8		72–73	75–71	97–95	—

Source: FIBA Europe

=== Group F ===
Pos	Team	Pld	W	L	PF	PA	PD	Pts	Qualification	BAN	FMP	VEF	OKA
1	(Turkey) Banvit	6	5	1	538	479	+59	11	Advance to last 16	—	89–78	103–79	99–84
2	(Serbia) FMP	6	5	1	523	488	+35	11	Advance to last 16	82–74	—	109–89	90–77
3	(Latvia) VEF Rīga	6	2	4	493	539	−46	8		78–85	81–85	—	79–76
4	(Belgium) Generali Okapi Aalstar	6	0	6	474	522	−48	6		78–88	78–79	81–87	—

Source: FIBA Europe

=== Group G ===
Pos	Team	Pld	W	L	PF	PA	PD	Pts	Qualification	ART	ANT	WBC	TAR
1	(Germany) Artland Dragons	6	5	1	474	415	+59	11	Advance to last 16	—	70–53	79–68	94–71
2	(Belgium) Antwerp Giants	6	3	3	438	442	−4	9	Advance to last 16	73–77	—	64–68	68–63
3	(Austria) WBC Raiffeisen Wels	6	3	3	409	424	−15	9		74–73	82–90	—	64–60
4	(Estonia) Tartu University Rock	6	1	5	410	450	−40	7		76–81	82–90	58–53	—

Source: FIBA Europe

=== Group H ===
Pos	Team	Pld	W	L	PF	PA	PD	Pts	Qualification	ROA	ZAG	KER	KYI
1	(France) Chorale Roanne	6	5	1	474	415	+59	11	Advance to last 16	—	95–66	96–74	73–70
2	Zagreb Croatia Osiguranje	6	3	3	438	442	−4	9	Advance to last 16	94–87	—	79–73	71–61
3	(Cyprus) Keravnos	6	3	3	409	424	−15	9		77–89	82–81	—	76–52
4	(Ukraine) Kyiv	6	1	5	410	450	−40	7		62–67	83–70	70–62	—

Source: FIBA Europe

== Last 16 ==
=== Group I ===
Pos	Team	Pld	W	L	PF	PA	PD	Pts	Qualification	GÖT	KRA	DBO	AEL
1	(Germany) Göttingen	6	5	1	527	435	+92	11	Advance to quarterfinals	—	89–68	89–69	92–59
2	(Russia) Krasnye Krylia	6	4	2	461	430	+31	10	Advance to quarterfinals	82–74	—	77–47	70–67
3	(Netherlands) EiffelTowers Den Bosch	6	2	4	444	498	−54	8		67–86	85–80	—	91–79
4	(Cyprus) Proteas EKA AEL	6	1	5	450	519	−69	7		90–97	68–84	87–85	—

Source: FIBA Europe

=== Group J ===
Pos	Team	Pld	W	L	PF	PA	PD	Pts	Qualification	ZAG	FMP	ART	LIÈ
1	Zagreb Croatia Osiguranje	6	4	2	454	456	−2	10	Advance to quarterfinals	—	78–83	69–67	79–94
2	(Serbia) FMP	6	4	2	462	441	+21	10	Advance to quarterfinals	63–74	—	86–80	81–55
3	(Germany) Artland Dragons	6	3	3	485	469	+16	9		70–72	82–72	—	86–78
4	(Belgium) Belgacom Liège	6	1	5	470	505	−35	7		79–82	72–77	92–100	—

Source: FIBA Europe

=== Group K ===
Pos	Team	Pld	W	L	PF	PA	PD	Pts	Qualification	PES	APOEL	CHA	BUD
1	(Italy) Scavolini Spar Pesaro	6	4	2	507	483	+24	10	Advance to quarterfinals	—	78–69	88–83	90–77
2	(Cyprus) APOEL	6	3	3	465	469	−4	9	Advance to quarterfinals	70–76	—	85–72	81–76
3	(France) Élan Chalon	6	3	3	493	480	+13	9		94–88	78–84	—	87–59
4	(Montenegro) Budućnost m:tel	6	2	4	467	500	−33	8		90–87	89–76	76–79	—

Source: FIBA Europe

=== Group L ===
Pos	Team	Pld	W	L	PF	PA	PD	Pts	Qualification	ROA	ANT	BAN	ENI
1	(France) Chorale Roanne	6	4	2	489	446	+43	10	Advance to quarterfinals	—	68–66	76–53	103–87
2	(Belgium) Antwerp Giants	6	3	3	454	457	−3	9	Advance to quarterfinals	70–89	—	72–59	81–72
3	(Turkey) Banvit	6	3	3	463	481	−18	9		95–83	80–88	—	94–85
4	(Russia) Enisey	6	2	4	485	507	−22	8		75–70	89–77	77–82	—

Source: FIBA Europe

== Quarterfinals ==
The quarterfinals were played in a best-of-three playoff format. The winners of the groups in the top 16 hosted game one and three (if possible).

Team 1	Series	Team 2	Game 1	Game 2	Game 3
Göttingen (Germany)	2–0	(Serbia) FMP	75–69	76–71	
Zagreb Croatia Osiguranje	0–2	(Russia) Krasnye Krylia	77–81	78–79	
Scavolini Spar Pesaro (Italy)	2–0	(Belgium) Antwerp Giants	92–76	78–63	
Chorale Roanne (France)	2–0	(Cyprus) APOEL	89–67	84–78	

== Final Four ==
The Final Four was held from 30 April until 2 May and was hosted at the Lokhalle in Göttingen, Germany.

Semi-finals
30 April
(Germany) Göttingen	77
(France) Chorale Roanne	67
30 April
(Russia) Krasnye Krylia	73
(Italy) Scavolini Spar Pesaro	70

Final
2 May
(Germany) Göttingen	83
(Russia) Krasnye Krylia	75
Third place
2 May
(France) Chorale Roanne	86
(Italy) Scavolini Spar Pesaro	80
