= Davin White =

American basketball player (born 1981)

No. 34 – Venados de Mazatlán
- Position: Point guard
- League: LNBP

Personal information
- Born: December 31, 1981 (age 44) Phoenix, Arizona
- Listed height: 6 ft 1 in (1.85 m)
- Listed weight: 193.6 lb (88 kg)

Career information
- High school: North (Phoenix, Arizona)
- College: Chandler–Gilbert CC (2001–2003); Cal State Northridge (2003–2005)
- NBA draft: 2005: undrafted
- Playing career: 2005–present

Career history
- 2005–2006: Niagara Dare Devils
- 2006: Mineros de Cananea
- 2006–2008: Anaheim Arsenal
- 2008: Colorado 14ers
- 2009: Swisslion Takovo
- 2010–2011: Mineros de Cananea
- 2011–2012: Halcones de Xalapa
- 2012: Phoenix Hagen
- 2012: Mineros de Cananea
- 2012–2013: Phoenix Hagen
- 2013: PBC Lukoil Academic
- 2013–2014: Maccabi Rishon LeZion
- 2014–2015: La Bruixa d'Or Manresa
- 2015–2019: Canarias
- 2020: Venados de Mazatlán
- 2020–2022: Libertadores de Querétaro
- 2022–present: Venados de Mazatlán

Career highlights
- FIBA Intercontinental Cup champion (2017); Champions League champion (2017); BBL scoring champion (2013); All-BBL Second team (2013); Phoenix Hagen Team of the Century

Davin White (born December 31, 1981) is an American professional basketball player for Venados de Mazatlán of the Liga Nacional de Baloncesto Profesional (LNBP).

== High school ==
White played high school basketball at North High School, in Phoenix, Arizona.

== College career ==
White played college basketball at Chandler–Gilbert CC, from 2001 to 2003. He then played at Cal State Northridge, with the Cal State Northridge Matadors, from 2003 to 2005.

== Professional career ==
While playing with the Phoenix Hagen, White was the leading scorer of the German League 2012–13 season. In 36 games played, he averaged 17.2 points and 4.2 assists per game.

On September 12, 2013, he signed with Lukoil Academic of Bulgaria. He left them in December 2013. He then signed with Maccabi Rishon LeZion of Israel.

In October 2014, he signed with Spanish club La Bruixa d'Or Manresa.

White has also competed with Team 23, in The Basketball Tournament on ESPN. He was a point guard on the 2015 team that made it to the $1 million championship game, where they lost to Overseas Elite by a score of 67–65. In the summer of 2017, White averaged 16.0 points per game for Team 23. He helped get Team 23 to the second round of the tournament, where they lost to Armored Athlete 84–77.

In 2015, White signs for the Spanish team Tenerife winning the 2017 Basketball Champions League Final Four.
