= Dagan Yivzori =

Israeli basketball player (born 1985)

Dagan Yivzori דגן יבזורי
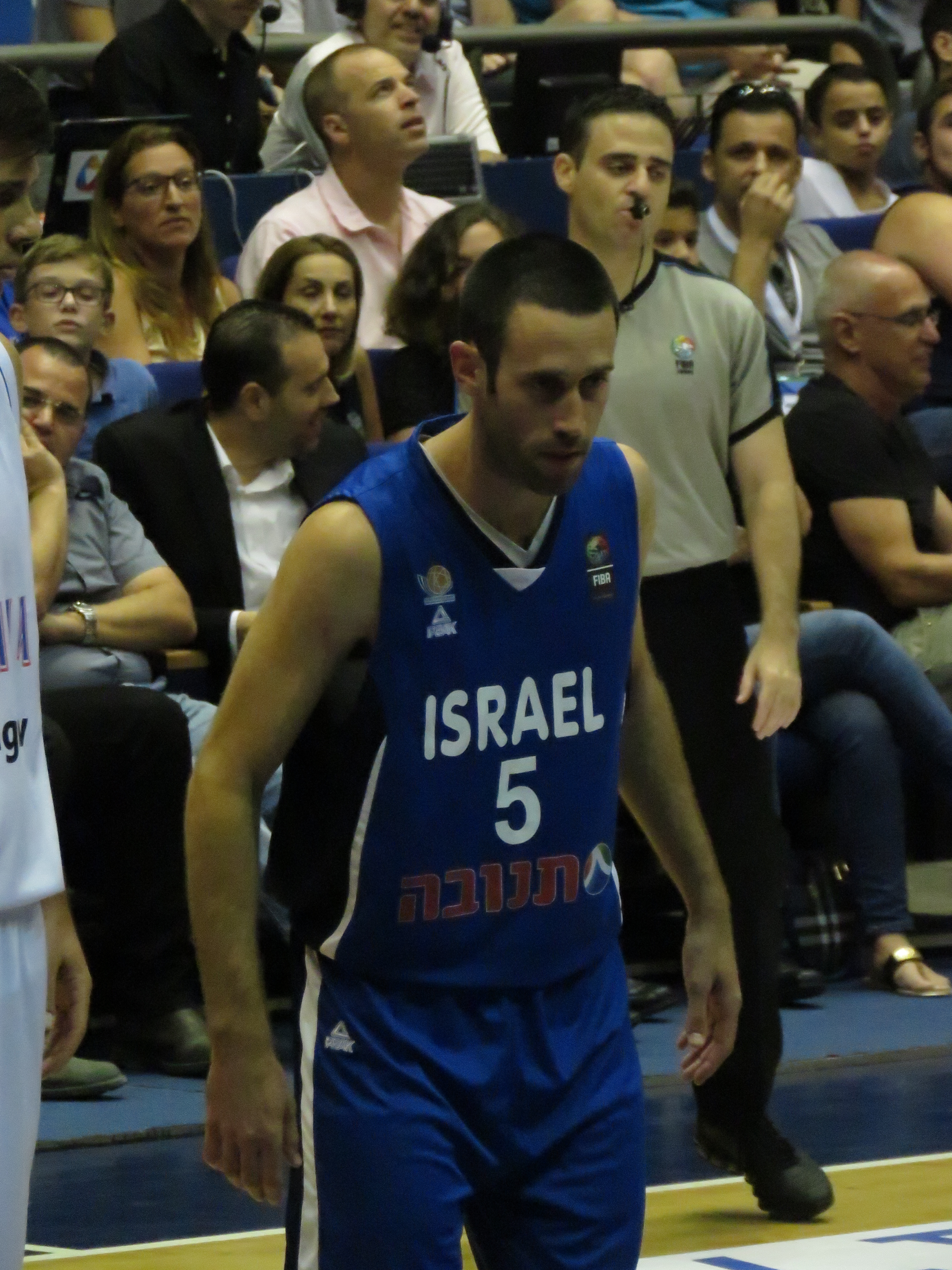
- Yivzori, playing for the Israeli National Team

Free agent
- Position: Shooting guard

Personal information
- Born: October 15, 1985 (age 41) Afula, Israel
- Listed height: 6 ft 4 in (1.93 m)
- Listed weight: 198 lb (90 kg)

Career information
- Playing career: 2002–present

Career history
- 2002–2003: Maccabi Kiryat Bialik
- 2003–2004: Hapoel Afula
- 2004–2007: Hapoel Yokneam/Megido
- 2007–2008: Hapoel Gilboa/Afula
- 2008–2013: Hapoel Gilboa Galil
- 2013–2015: Maccabi Haifa
- 2015–2017: Maccabi Tel Aviv
- 2017: Hapoel Holon
- 2017–2018: Maccabi Haifa
- 2018–2019: Ironi Nahariya

Career highlights
- Israeli League Finals MVP (2014); Israeli League champion (2010)

Dagan Yivzori (Hebrew: דגן יבזורי; born October 15, 1985) is an Israeli basketball player who last played for Ironi Nahariya of the Israeli Premier League. He was the 2014 Israeli Basketball Premier League Finals MVP. He also plays for the Israeli national team in the international level.

Yivzori, standing at 1.93 (6 ft 4 in), is considered one of the best sharpshooters in the Israeli League.

== Professional career ==
=== Early career ===
Yivzori started his professional career playing for Liga Leumit teams, Maccabi Kiryat Bialik and Hapoel Afula B.C., without leaving his mark.

=== Hapoel Yokneam/Megido ===
In 2004, he signed for Liga Artzit (3rd tier) side Hapoel Yokneam/Megido, where he became one of the league's stars. In his second season with Yokneam/Megido, Dagan has achieved a promotion with the team, leading them with averages of 18.4 points, 3.8 rebounds and 3.5 assists. One season later, Dagan led the team into Liga Leumit semifinals and to the State Cup's quarterfinals. In addition, he won the best Israeli award and was elected to the league's all-team.

=== Hapoel Gilboa/Afula ===
In 2007–08, Yivzori has firstly played in the first league, signing for Hapoel Gilboa/Afula. The team was relegated at the end of the season.

=== Hapoel Gilboa Galil ===
Dagan has stayed in the Israeli Super League signing for Hapoel Gilboa Galil, where he was assigned as the sixth player. He finished the season with averages of 5.5 points in 16 minutes. He played there also for the 2009–10 season. In the summer of 2010, Yivzori signed with Hapoel Holon but was released before the season start because of financial difficulties. In September 2010 he signed back with Gilboa Galil.

He totally played 5 seasons for Gilboa Galil.

=== Maccabi Haifa ===
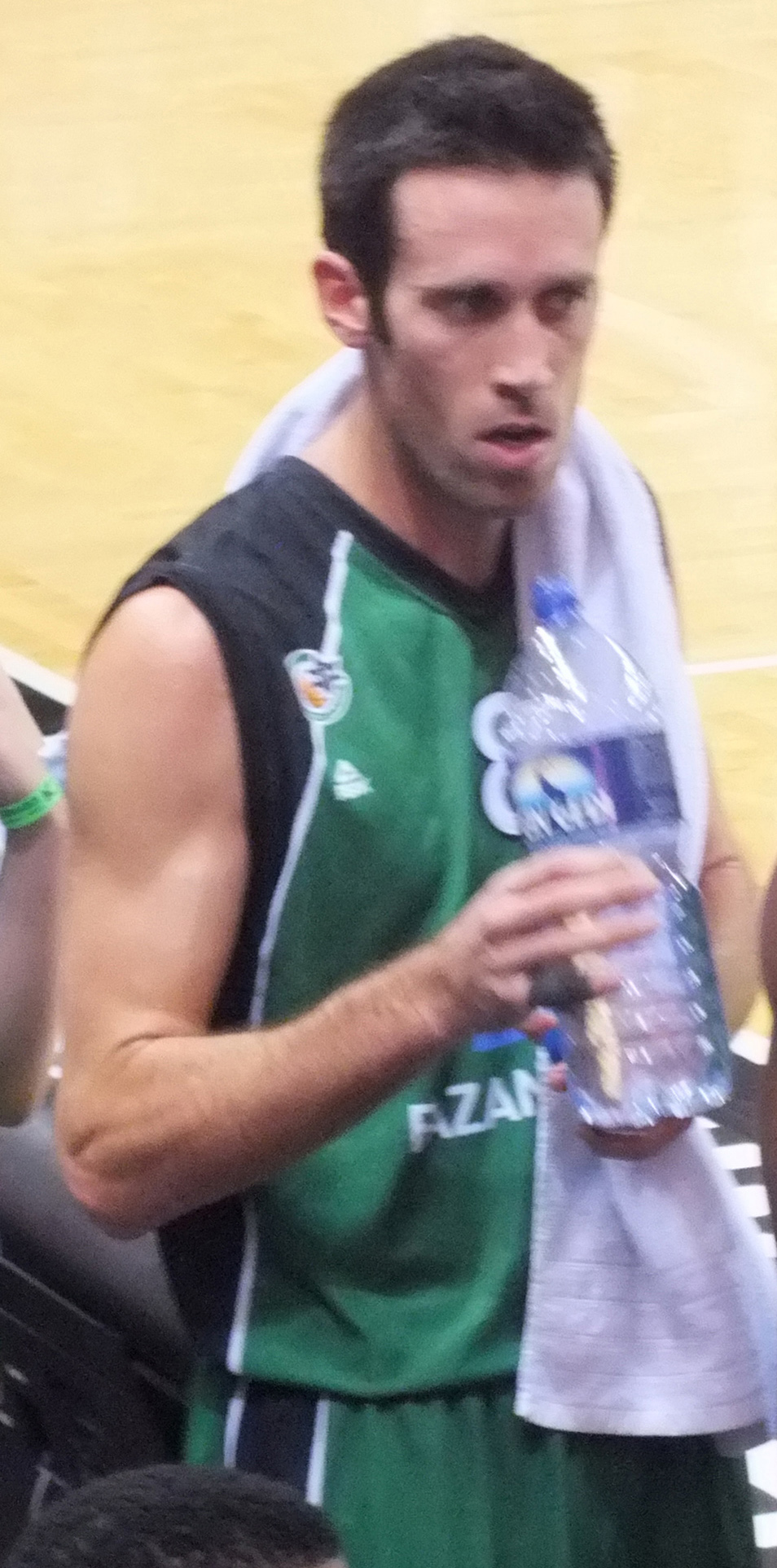
Yivzori during his tenure with Maccabi Haifa.

In 2013, Yivzori joined the Israeli league champion Maccabi Haifa. His best game for the Greens was an away win against Hapoel Jerusalem, where he scored 36 points with 6/7 for two points and 7/10 behind the arc. He was the 2014 Israeli Basketball Premier League Finals MVP.

=== Maccabi Tel Aviv and Hapoel Holon ===
On 2 July 2015, Yivzori signed with Euroleague-side team Maccabi Tel Aviv, for three years. However, three months into his second year in yellow, with barely any minutes spent on the court, he had his contract untied and signed with Hapoel Holon on 4 January 2017.

=== Return to Haifa ===
On July 18, 2017, Yivzori returned to Maccabi Haifa and signed a three-year deal.

=== Ironi Nahariya ===
On July 12, 2018, Yivzori parted ways with Haifa and signed with Ironi Nahariya for the 2018–19 season.

== Israeli national team ==
Yivzori has also been a member of the senior Israeli national basketball team. He represented Israel in the EuroBasket 2015 qualification, as well as the EuroBasket 2015 itself.
