= David Bell (basketball) =

American basketball player (born 1981)

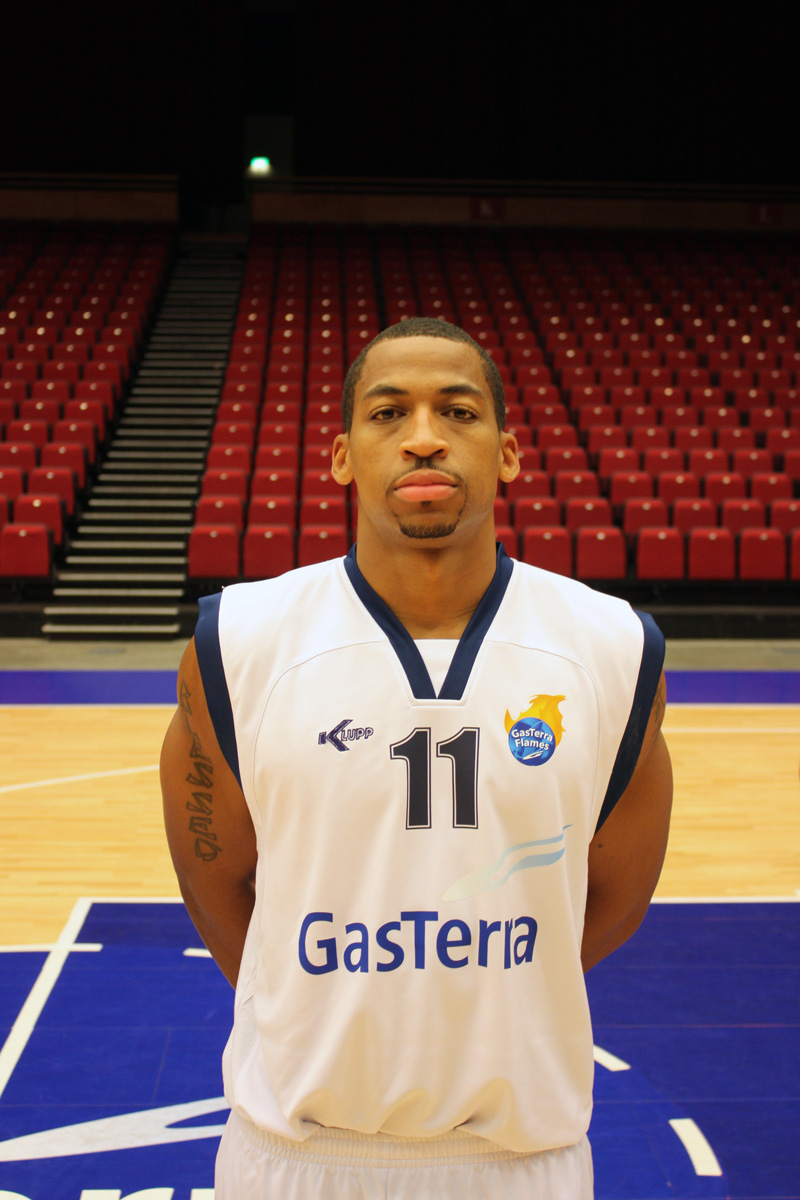
- Bell in his GasTerra Flames jersey in 2011

Free agent
- Position: Point guard / shooting guard

Personal information
- Born: June 20, 1981 (age 45) Oakland, California
- Listed height: 6 ft 1 in (1.85 m)
- Listed weight: 180.4 lb (82 kg)

Career information
- High school: Hayward (Hayward, California)
- College: Porterville College (1999–2001); Montana (2001–2003)
- NBA draft: 2003: undrafted
- Playing career: 2003–present

Career history
- 2004–2005: Lausanne Morges Basket
- 2005: Union Neuchâtel
- 2006: Kouvot
- 2006–2007: Butte Daredevils
- 2007: Dodge City Legend
- 2008: Champagne Châlons-Reims
- 2008–2010: Dakota Wizards
- 2010–2011: Phoenix Hagen
- 2011–2012: Donar
- 2012–2016: Phoenix Hagen
- 2016–2017: Dinamo Sassari
- 2017–2018: Andrea Costa Imola
- 2018–2019: Gießen 46ers
- 2019–2020: Phoenix Brussels

Career highlights
- 2× First-team All-Big Sky (2002, 2003); Phoenix Hagen Team of the Century

David Bell (born June 20, 1981) is an American professional basketball player who last played for Phoenix Brussels. Formerly, Bell played college basketball for the Montana Grizzlies basketball team and is playing professional since 2004. He has also played for multiple teams in the United States and in Europe.

== Professional career ==
In September 2010, Bell signed with Phoenix Hagen of the German Basketball Bundesliga.

In June 2011, Bell signed a 2-year contract with GasTerra Flames Groningen of the Dutch DBL. On May 28, 2012, his contract was terminated by the club.

On June 21, 2012, Phoenix Hagen announced that Bell was returning to the team for a second stint. In April 2015, he extended his contract until 2017. In December 2016, Phoenix Hagen was thrown out of the BBL because of financial troubles and Bell became a free agent.

On December 8, 2016, Bell signed with Dinamo Sassari of the Italian LBA. On December 10, in his debut with the team Bell scored 18 points in a 69–66 win against Dolomiti Energia Trentino.

On August 2, 2017, Bell signed with Andrea Costa Imola.

On August 23, 2018, Bell was announced by the Gießen 46ers of the German BBL. In August 2018, it was announced Bell had a crack in his chest muscles, which would cause him to miss up to 4 months.

=== The Basketball Tournament (TBT) (2017–present) ===
In the summer of 2017, Bell played in The Basketball Tournament on ESPN for Team 23. He competed for the $2 million prize, and for Team 23, he averaged 18.0 points per game. Bell helped Team 23 the second round of the tournament, where they then lost to Armored Athlete 84–77.

== Honors ==
Dakota Wizards

- NBA D-League Central Division: 2008
