= Keaton Nankivil =

American basketball player (born 1989)

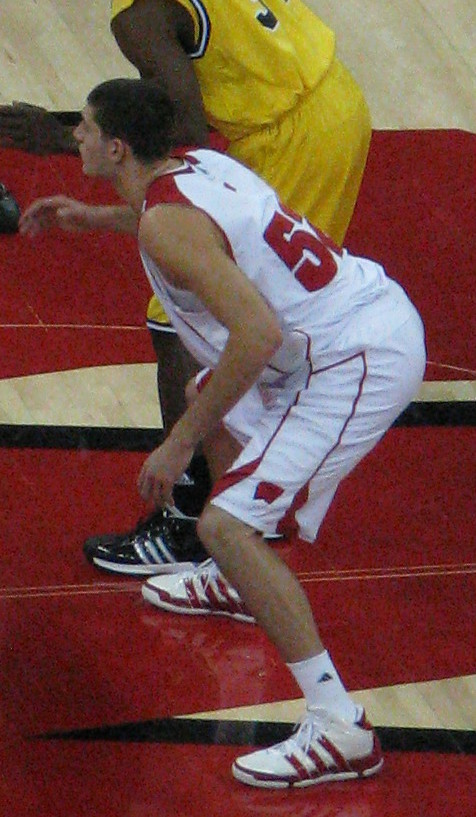

Personal information
- Born: January 18, 1989 (age 37) Madison, Wisconsin, U.S.
- Listed height: 6 ft 8 in (2.03 m)
- Listed weight: 227 lb (103 kg)

Career information
- High school: James Madison Memorial (Madison, Wisconsin)
- College: Wisconsin (2007–2011)
- NBA draft: 2011: undrafted
- Playing career: 2011–2016
- Position: Power forward
- Number: 52

Career history
- 2011–2014: ratiopharm Ulm
- 2014–2015: Río Natura Monbús
- 2015–2016: VEF Rīga
- 2016: Orlandina Basket

Career highlights
- Co-Wisconsin Mr. Basketball (2007)

Keaton Nankivil (born January 18, 1989) is a former basketball player from the United States. He last played for Orlandina Basket of the Italian Serie A.

He played four seasons for the Wisconsin Badgers. In 2011, he moved to Germany to play professionally. Nankivil played three seasons with ratiopharm Ulm; in his last one, he averaged 6 points and 3.6 rebounds. He signed with Rio Natura Monbús in the 2014 offseason.
