= Aaron Miles (basketball) =

American basketball player and coach (born 1983)

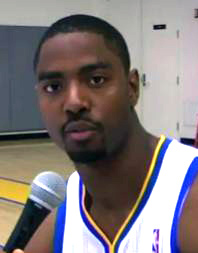
- Miles at Golden State Warriors 2010 Media Day

Personal information
- Born: April 13, 1983 (age 43) Portland, Oregon, U.S.
- Listed height: 6 ft 1 in (1.85 m)
- Listed weight: 175 lb (79 kg)

Career information
- High school: Jefferson (Portland, Oregon)
- College: Kansas (2001–2005)
- NBA draft: 2005: undrafted
- Playing career: 2005–2015
- Position: Point guard
- Number: 0
- Coaching career: 2015–present

Career history

Playing
- 2005–2006: Golden State Warriors
- 2006: Fort Worth Flyers
- 2006–2007: Élan Béarnais Pau-Orthez
- 2007–2008: Cajasol Sevilla
- 2008–2009: Panionios
- 2009–2010: Aris
- 2010–2011: Reno Bighorns
- 2011–2014: Krasnye Krylya
- 2014–2015: Lokomotiv Kuban

Coaching
- 2015–2016: Kansas (assistant)
- 2016–2017: Florida Gulf Coast (assistant)
- 2017–2019: Santa Cruz Warriors
- 2019–2021: Golden State Warriors (player development)
- 2021–2023: Boston Celtics (assistant)
- 2023–2026: New Orleans Pelicans (assistant)

Career highlights
- Russian Cup MVP (2013); 2× Russian Cup winner (2012, 2013); EuroChallenge champion (2013); French Cup winner (2007); HEBA Greek All Star Game (2009); Second-team Parade All-American (2001); McDonald's All-American (2001); Morgan Wootten National Player of the Year (2001)
- Stats at NBA.com
- Stats at Basketball Reference

Aaron Marquez Miles (born April 13, 1983) is an American basketball coach and former player working as an assistant coach for the New Orleans Pelicans of the National Basketball Association (NBA). He played college basketball for the Kansas Jayhawks and had a brief stint in the NBA with the Golden State Warriors. Standing at 6 ft 1 in (1.85 m), he played at the point guard position. Miles was previously an assistant coach for the Florida Gulf Coast Eagles and a head coach for the Santa Cruz Warriors of the NBA G League. In 2019, he was hired as a player development coach with the Golden State Warriors.

== High school career ==
Miles played for Jefferson High School in north Portland, Oregon. The Democrats won the 2000 4A Oregon state championship, beating Tualatin 58–44, and capping a 28–0 season. The Democrats finished the year with a No. 4 national ranking and several other players went on to play in college, such as Michael Lee (Kansas), Thomas Gardner (Missouri), and Brandon Brooks (USC).

== College career ==
After being named the Oregon 4A High School basketball player of the year as well as McDonald's Morgan Wooten National Player of the Year, Miles attended the University of Kansas, where he starred at the point guard position for the Kansas Jayhawks men's basketball team. He helped lead the Jayhawks to two consecutive Final Four appearances in 2002 and 2003 and an appearance in the 2003 national championship game. He is the all-time assists leader (with 954 career assists) of both Kansas and the Big 12 Conference. He was named to the All-Big 12 Team in both 2004 and 2005.

He was also named to the All-Big 12 Defensive Team three times and he finished his college career, in eighth place in NCAA history in assists and in second place all-time in Kansas history in steals.

== Professional career ==
=== NBA (2005–2006) ===
Miles signed in September 2005, as an undrafted rookie free agent with the NBA's Golden State Warriors for the 2005–06 season, but was released in January 2006, before his contract became guaranteed. He played for the Fort Worth Flyers in the NBA Development League for the remainder of that season where he played with his Kansas teammate Keith Langford.

=== Europe (2006–2010) ===
He signed for the 2006–07 season with the French League club Élan Béarnais Pau-Orthez, a team that played in the Euroleague that season, and won the French National Cup championship that year. He played with the Spanish ACB club Cajasol Sevilla in the 2007–08 season.

In August 2008, Miles joined one of the three Euroleague teams from the Greek League for the 2008–09 season, Panionios. In October 2009, he signed with another Greek team Aris BC for the 2009–10 season.

=== Return to America (2010–2011) ===
In 2010, Miles joined the try-outs for the Warriors, but was released days before the start of the season. He signed with the Reno Bighorns. He was sent to the Bakersfield Jam, but was quickly waived due to injury.

=== Back to Europe (2011–2015) ===
Miles returned to Europe in August 2011, when he signed with BC Krasnye Krylya. In 2012 and 2013, he won the Russian Cup with Krasnye, in the second he was named Finals MVP. With the team, he also won the 2012–13 FIBA EuroChallenge. In July 2014, he left Krasnye Krylya.

On July 9, 2014, Miles signed a one-year deal with Lokomotiv Kuban.

== Coaching career ==
=== College coaching career (2015–2017) ===
Following his career as a player, Miles was hired at the University of Kansas as assistant director of student-athlete development for the 2015–16 season. The following year, he accepted a position as assistant coach at Florida Gulf Coast University under head coach Joe Dooley, a former coach of Miles at Kansas.

=== Santa Cruz Warriors / Golden State Warriors (2017–2021) ===
On August 10, 2017, Miles was named head coach of the Santa Cruz Warriors, the NBA G League developmental team of the Golden State Warriors. After two seasons, he was promoted to staff with Golden State as a player development coach.

=== Boston Celtics (2021–2023) ===
In the summer of 2021, Miles was hired as an assistant coach by the Boston Celtics

=== New Orleans Pelicans (2023–2026) ===
On June 23, 2023, Miles was hired as an assistant coach by the New Orleans Pelicans.

== Statistics ==
Legend
GP	Games played	MPG	Minutes per game	FG%	Field goal percentage
3P%	3-point field goal percentage	FT%	Free throw percentage	RPG	Rebounds per game
APG	Assists per game	SPG	Steals per game	BPG	Blocks per game
PPG	Points per game	**Bold**	Career high		Led the league

Regular season

Year	Team	League	GP	MPG	FG%	3P%	FT%	RPG	APG	SPG	BPG	PPG
2010–11	(United States) Reno Bighorns	D-League	17	34.5	.511	.000	.786	4.1	8.8	2.5	0.2	15.1
2011–12	(Russia) BC Krasnye Krylya	PBL	17	31.5	.413	.500	.845	3.9	6.0	1.4	0.2	8.6
2011–12	(Russia) BC Krasnye Krylya	VTB United	16	33.1	.487	.300	.746	4.3	3.8	2.5	0.2	10.8
2012–13	(Russia) BC Krasnye Krylya	PBL	17	32.1	.391	.154	.811	3.8	5.6	1.9	0.1	8.5
2012–13	(Russia) BC Krasnye Krylya	VTB United	18	34.6	.423	.158	.831	4.2	7.3	2.2	0.1	10.2

== See also ==
- List of NCAA Division I men's basketball career assists leaders
