= 2012–13 FIBA EuroChallenge =

FIBA EuroChallenge
- Season: 2012–13
- Duration: 6 November 2012 – 28 April 2013
- Teams: 32

Finals
- Champions: (Russia) Krasnye Krylia Samara (1st title)
- Runners-up: (Turkey) Pınar Karşıyaka
- Third place: (Germany) EWE Baskets Oldenburg
- Fourth place: (France) BCM Gravelines
- Final Four MVP: (United States) Chester Simmons

Statistical leaders
Points	(United States) Frank Hassell	20.2
Rebounds	(United States) Frank Hassell	11.6
Assists	(United States) Aaron Miles	6.9

2012–13 EuroChallenge was the 9th edition of Europe's third-tier level transnational competition for men's professional basketball clubs.

== Teams ==
32 teams will participate in EuroChallenge Regular Season:

- A total of 28 teams have already qualified directly to the 32-team regular season.
- Another 4 teams will earn their place at the group stage by winning a qualifying round.

Regular season teams
Country (League)	Teams	Teams (rankings in 2010–11 national championships)			
France (LNB)	4	BCM Gravelines (5)	SLUC Nancy (6)	Paris-Levallois (7)	JDA Dijon (9)
Romania (Divizia A)	4	Asesoft Ploiești (1)	BC Timișoara (2)	CS Gaz Metan Mediaş (3)	BCMU Pitești (9)
Belgium (BLB)	3	Port of Antwerp Giants (3)	Belfius Mons-Hainaut (4)	Okapi Aalstar (5)	
Cyprus (Division 1)	3	Michelin ETHA (1)	Keravnos Strovolou (2)	Pizza Express Apollon (3)	
Finland (Korisliiga)	2	Joensuun Kataja (2)	Tampereen Pyrintö (4)		
Germany (BBL)	2	Telekom Baskets (8)	EWE Baskets Oldenburg (10)		
Hungary (NBI/A)	2	Szolnoki Olaj KK (1)	Lami-Véd Körmend (4)		
Sweden (Basketligan)	2	Norrköping Dolphins (1)	Södertälje Kings (2)		
Turkey (TBL)	2	Pınar Karşıyaka (6)	Tofaş Bursa (8)		
Belarus (BPL)	1	Tsmoki-Minsk (1)			
Estonia (KML)	1	University of Tartu (2)			
(Georgia (country)) Georgia (Super Liga)	1	BC Armia (1)			
Israel (BSL)	1	Hapoel Holon (4)			
Latvia (LBL)	1	BK Ventspils (2)			
Russia (PBL)	1	Krasnye Krylia Samara (8)			
Slovenia (SKL)	1	Krka Novo Mesto (1)			
Ukraine (SuperLeague)	1	Khimik Yuzhny (5)			

== Qualifying round ==
First leg will be played in September 25 and the second one in October 2. Team 1 plays the second leg at home.

Team #1	Agg.	Team #2	1st leg	2nd leg
Aliağa Petkim (Turkey)	134–159	(Finland) Joensuun Kataja	70–82	64–77
Pizza Express Apollon (Cyprus)	174–160	(Austria) Xion Dukes Klosterneuburg	78–70	96–90
Ural Ekaterinburg (Russia)	161–164	(Romania) Gaz Metan Mediaș	69–67	92–97
Tofaş Bursa (Turkey)	185–152	(Estonia) Rakvere Tarvas	106–76	79–76

== Regular season ==
Key to colors
Top two places in each group advanced to Last 16

The Regular Season began on November 6 and finished on December 14, 2012.

=== Group A ===
	Team	Pld	W	L	PF	PA	Diff	Pts
1.	(Turkey) Pınar Karşıyaka	6	5	1	486	375	+111	11
2.	(Turkey) Tofaş Bursa	6	4	2	438	402	+36	10
3.	(Slovenia) Krka Novo Mesto	6	3	3	459	439	+20	9
4.	(Cyprus) Michelin ETHA	6	0	6	363	530	–167	6

	KRK	ETH	KSK	TOF
(Slovenia) Krka Novo Mesto		100–73	80–74	70–72
(Cyprus) Michelin ETHA	59–74		59–86	57–78
(Turkey) Pınar Karşıyaka	79–56	105–61		78–56
(Turkey) Tofaş Bursa	82–79	87–54	63–64	

=== Group B ===
	Team	Pld	W	L	PF	PA	Diff	Pts
1.	(Russia) Krasnye Krylia Samara	6	6	0	499	417	+82	12
2.	(Finland) Joensuun Kataja	6	3	3	453	434	+19	9
3.	(Cyprus) Keravnos Strovolou	6	2	4	438	465	–27	8
4.	(Romania) Asesoft Ploiești	6	1	5	448	522	–74	7

	ASE	KAT	KER	KRA
(Romania) Asesoft Ploiești		67–80	90–87	76–79
(Finland) Joensuun Kataja	91–67		71–66	86–96
(Cyprus) Keravnos Strovolou	88–76	72–67		51–82
(Russia) Krasnye Krylia Samara	97–72	66–58	79–74	

=== Group C ===
	Team	Pld	W	L	PF	PA	Diff	Pts
1.	(Latvia) BK Ventspils	6	6	0	481	388	+93	12
2.	(Sweden) Norrköping Dolphins	6	2	4	409	427	–18	8
3.	(Sweden) Södertälje Kings	6	2	4	404	439	–35	8
4.	(Finland) Tampereen Pyrintö	6	2	4	431	471	–40	8

	VEN	NOR	SÖD	PYR
(Latvia) BK Ventspils		72–68	90–56	79–59
(Sweden) Norrköping Dolphins	51–69		64–62	84–73
(Sweden) Södertälje Kings	80–82	67–62		74–68
(Finland) Tampereen Pyrintö	74–89	84–80	73–65	

=== Group D ===
	Team	Pld	W	L	PF	PA	Diff	Pts
1.	(Ukraine) BC Khimik Yuzhny	6	4	2	484	471	+13	10
2.	(Romania) Gaz Metan Mediaș	6	4	2	476	473	+3	10
3.	(France) JDA Dijon Basket	6	2	4	464	461	+3	8
4.	(Estonia) Tartu University Rock	6	2	4	431	450	–19	8

	MED	JDA	KHI	TAR
(Romania) Gaz Metan Mediaș		92–89	88–86	81–58
(France) JDA Dijon Basket	83–79		73–76	83–61
(Ukraine) BC Khimik Yuzhny	89–66	79–74		77–76
(Estonia) Tartu University Rock	68–70	74–62	94–77	

=== Group E ===
	Team	Pld	W	L	PF	PA	Diff	Pts
1.	(France) Paris-Levallois	6	4	2	516	486	+30	10
2.	(Belgium) Okapi Aalstar	6	4	2	523	485	+38	10
3.	(Belgium) Belfius Mons-Hainaut	6	3	3	506	491	+15	9
4.	(Romania) BCM U Pitești	6	1	5	438	521	–83	7

	PIT	MON	OKA	PAR
(Romania) BCM U Pitești		73–78	89–77	75–91
(Belgium) Belfius Mons-Hainaut	92–63		77–84	89–90
(Belgium) Okapi Aalstar	99–68	97–84		76–86
(France) Paris-Levallois	84–70	84–86	81–90	

=== Group F ===
	Team	Pld	W	L	PF	PA	Diff	Pts
1.	(Germany) EWE Baskets Oldenburg	6	6	0	517	401	+116	12
2.	(Hungary) Szolnoki Olaj KK	6	3	3	486	509	–23	9
3.	(Hungary) Lami-Véd Körmend	6	2	4	479	525	–46	8
4.	(Romania) BC Timișoara	6	1	5	445	492	–47	7

	TIM	EWE	KÖR	SZO
(Romania) BC Timișoara		66–76	75–65	80–93
(Germany) EWE Baskets Oldenburg	84–67		95–64	87–70
(Hungary) Lami-Véd Körmend	97–86	67–90		92–96
(Hungary) Szolnoki Olaj KK	77–71	67–85	83–94	

=== Group G ===
	Team	Pld	W	L	PF	PA	Diff	Pts
1.	(France) BCM Gravelines	6	4	2	504	422	+82	10
2.	(Belarus) Tsmoki-Minsk	6	4	2	445	441	+4	10
3.	(France) SLUC Nancy	6	3	3	435	424	+11	9
4.	(Cyprus) Pizza Express Apollon	6	1	5	421	518	–97	7

	GRA	APO	NAN	MIN
(France) BCM Gravelines		88–64	69–71	96–63
(Cyprus) Pizza Express Apollon	89–88		65–81	72–81
(France) SLUC Nancy	68–80	87–69		57–63
(Belarus) Tsmoki-Minsk	67–83	93–62	78–71	

=== Group H ===
	Team	Pld	W	L	PF	PA	Diff	Pts
1.	(Germany) Telekom Baskets	6	4	2	491	455	+36	10
2.	(Israel) Hapoel Holon	6	4	2	478	453	+25	10
3.	(Belgium) Port of Antwerp Giants	6	4	2	478	446	+32	10
4.	(Georgia (country)) BC Armia	6	0	6	414	507	–93	6

	ARM	HOL	ANT	TEL
(Georgia (country)) BC Armia		72–79	71–80	77–102
(Israel) Hapoel Holon	84–69		88–64	75–70
(Belgium) Port of Antwerp Giants	87–54	93–74		72–81
(Germany) Telekom Baskets	75–71	85–78		78–82

== Last 16 ==
Key to colors
Homecourt advantage for quarterfinals
Advance to quarterfinals

Starts on January 15, 2013

=== Group I ===
	Team	Pld	W	L	PF	PA	Diff	Pts
1.	(Turkey) Pınar Karşıyaka	6	4	2	496	449	+47	10
2.	(Finland) Joensuun Kataja	6	3	3	459	480	–21	9
3.	(Romania) Gaz Metan Mediaș	6	3	3	426	473	–47	9
4.	(Latvia) BK Ventspils	6	2	4	463	442	+21	8

	VEN	MED	KAT	KSK
(Latvia) BK Ventspils		96–64	75–61	81–86
(Romania) Gaz Metan Mediaș	67–58		84–82	77–69
(Finland) Joensuun Kataja	80–78	79–75		87–79
(Turkey) Pınar Karşıyaka	84–75	89–59	89–70	

=== Group J ===
	Team	Pld	W	L	PF	PA	Diff	Pts
1.	(France) BCM Gravelines	6	5	1	493	475	+18	11
2.	(France) Paris-Levallois	6	4	2	520	464	+56	10
3.	(Hungary) Szolnoki Olaj KK	6	3	3	456	464	–8	9
4.	(Israel) Hapoel Holon	6	0	6	447	513	–66	6

	GRA	HOL	PAR	SZO
(France) BCM Gravelines		86–80	82–77	82–78
(Israel) Hapoel Holon	79–85		84–101	72–77
(France) Paris-Levallois	86–87	83–66		93–71
(Hungary) Szolnoki Olaj KK	75–71	81–66	74–80	

=== Group K ===
	Team	Pld	W	L	PF	PA	Diff	Pts
1.	(Russia) Krasnye Krylia Samara	6	6	0	503	415	+88	12
2.	(Ukraine) BC Khimik Yuzhny	6	3	3	458	435	+23	9
3.	(Turkey) Tofaş Bursa	6	2	4	448	477	–29	8
4.	(Sweden) Norrköping Dolphins	6	1	5	424	506	–82	7

	KHI	KRA	NOR	TOF
(Ukraine) BC Khimik Yuzhny		69–77	81–51	69–62
(Russia) Krasnye Krylia Samara	76–68		93–75	86–65
(Sweden) Norrköping Dolphins	76–81	68–93		84–82
(Turkey) Tofaş Bursa	93–90	70–78	76–70	

=== Group L ===
	Team	Pld	W	L	PF	PA	Diff	Pts
1.	(Germany) EWE Baskets Oldenburg	6	5	1	501	441	+60	11
2.	(Germany) Telekom Baskets	6	4	2	463	448	+15	10
3.	(Belgium) Okapi Aalstar	6	2	4	477	498	–21	8
4.	(Belarus) Tsmoki-Minsk	6	1	5	439	493	–54	7

	EWE	OKA	TEL	MIN
(Germany) EWE Baskets Oldenburg		82–74	88–92	74–64
(Belgium) Okapi Aalstar	80–103		60–65	100–76
(Germany) Telekom Baskets	62–85	85–72		86–72
(Belarus) Tsmoki-Minsk	66–72	87–91	74–70	

== Quarter-finals ==
Quarter-finals were played in a best-of-three series. Matches dates were 12, 14 and 19 March. Team 1 played the first and the third game at home court.

Team 1	Agg.	Team 2	Game 1	Game 2	Game 3
Pınar Karşıyaka (Turkey)	2–1	(France) Paris-Levallois	74–76	72–66	85–69
BCM Gravelines (France)	2–0	(Finland) Joensuun Kataja	86–57	102–98	
Krasnye Krylia Samara (Russia)	2–0	(Germany) Telekom Baskets	80–60	95–85	
EWE Baskets Oldenburg (Germany)	2–1	(Ukraine) BC Khimik Yuzhny	82–74	61–66	100–78

== Final Four ==
The Final Four was held in the Karşıyaka Arena at İzmir, Turkey.

Semifinals; 26 April
(Turkey) Pınar Karşıyaka	66
(Germany) EWE Baskets	62
(France) BCM Gravelines	78
(Russia) Krasnye Krylia	81

Final; 28 April
(Turkey) Pınar Karşıyaka	76
(Russia) Krasnye Krylia	77
Third place game
(Germany) EWE Baskets	84
(France) BCM Gravelines	76

== Awards ==
=== Weekly MVP ===
==== Regular season ====
Round	Player	Team	EFF
1	(United States) Franklin Hassell	(Israel) Hapoel Holon	37
2	(Hungary) Márton Báder	(Hungary) Szolnoki Olaj	45
3	(United States) Brandon Brown	(Cyprus) Pizza Express Apollon	32
4	(United States) Matthew Shaw	(Hungary) Lami-Véd Körmend	38
5	(United States) Sean May	(France) Paris-Levallois	38
6	(United States) Bryan Hopkins	(Belgium) Antwerp Giants	38

==== Last 16 ====
Round	Player	Team	EFF
1	(United States) Lawrence Hill	(Israel) Hapoel Holon	37
2	(United States) Bobby Dixon	(Turkey) Pınar Karşıyaka	34
3	(United States) Jerome Dyson	(Israel) Hapoel Holon	33
4	(United States) Kyle Weems	(Germany) Telekom Baskets Bonn	35
5	(United States) Franklin Hassell	(Israel) Hapoel Holon	31
6	(United States) Jonte Flowers	(Finland) Kataja	31

==== Quarterfinals ====
Round	Player	Team	EFF
1	(United States) Will Thomas	(Turkey) Pınar Karşıyaka	29
2	(United States) Will Thomas	(Turkey) Pınar Karşıyaka	29
3	(United States) Adam Chubb	(Germany) EWE Baskets Oldenburg	29
3	(United States) Rickey Paulding	(Germany) EWE Baskets Oldenburg	29
3	(United States) Will Thomas	(Turkey) Pınar Karşıyaka	29

=== Final Four MVP ===
Player	Team
(United States) Chester Simmons	(Russia) Krasnye Krylia Samara

== Individual statistics ==
=== Points ===
Rank	Name	Team	Games	Points	PPG
1	(United States) Frank Hassell	(Israel) Hapoel Holon	11	222	20.2
2	(United States) Sean May	(France) Paris-Levallois Basket	13	258	19.8
3	(United States) Jerome Dyson	(Israel) Hapoel Holon	12	225	18.8
4	(United States) Robert Dixon	(Turkey) Pinar Karsiyaka	17	310	18.2
5	(United States) Jonte Flowers	(Finland) Joensuun Kataja	15	269	17.9

=== Rebounds ===
Rank	Name	Team	Games	Rebounds	RPG
1	(United States) Frank Hassell	(Israel) Hapoel Holon	11	128	11.6
2	(Hungary) Marton Bader	(Hungary) Szolnoki Olaj KK	12	118	9.8
3	(United States) Lawrence Hill	(Israel) Hapoel Holon	12	98	8.2
4	(United States) Sean May	(France) Paris-Levallois Basket	13	101	7.8
5	(Nigeria) Chinemelu Elonu	(Turkey) Tofaş S.K.	15	269	7.6

=== Assists ===
Rank	Name	Team	Games	Assists	APG
1	(United States) Aaron Miles	(Russia) BC Krasnye Krylia	16	110	6.9
2	(France) Andrew Albicy	(France) Paris-Levallois Basket	15	96	6.4
3	(United States) Jared Jordan	(Germany) Telekom Baskets Bonn	14	83	5.9
4	(United States) Bobby Dixon	(Turkey) Pinar Karsiyaka	17	92	5.4
5	(United States) Willie Deane	(Ukraine) BC Khimik	15	71	4.7

== See also ==
- 2012–13 Eurocup Basketball
