= Tre Simmons =

American basketball player and coach

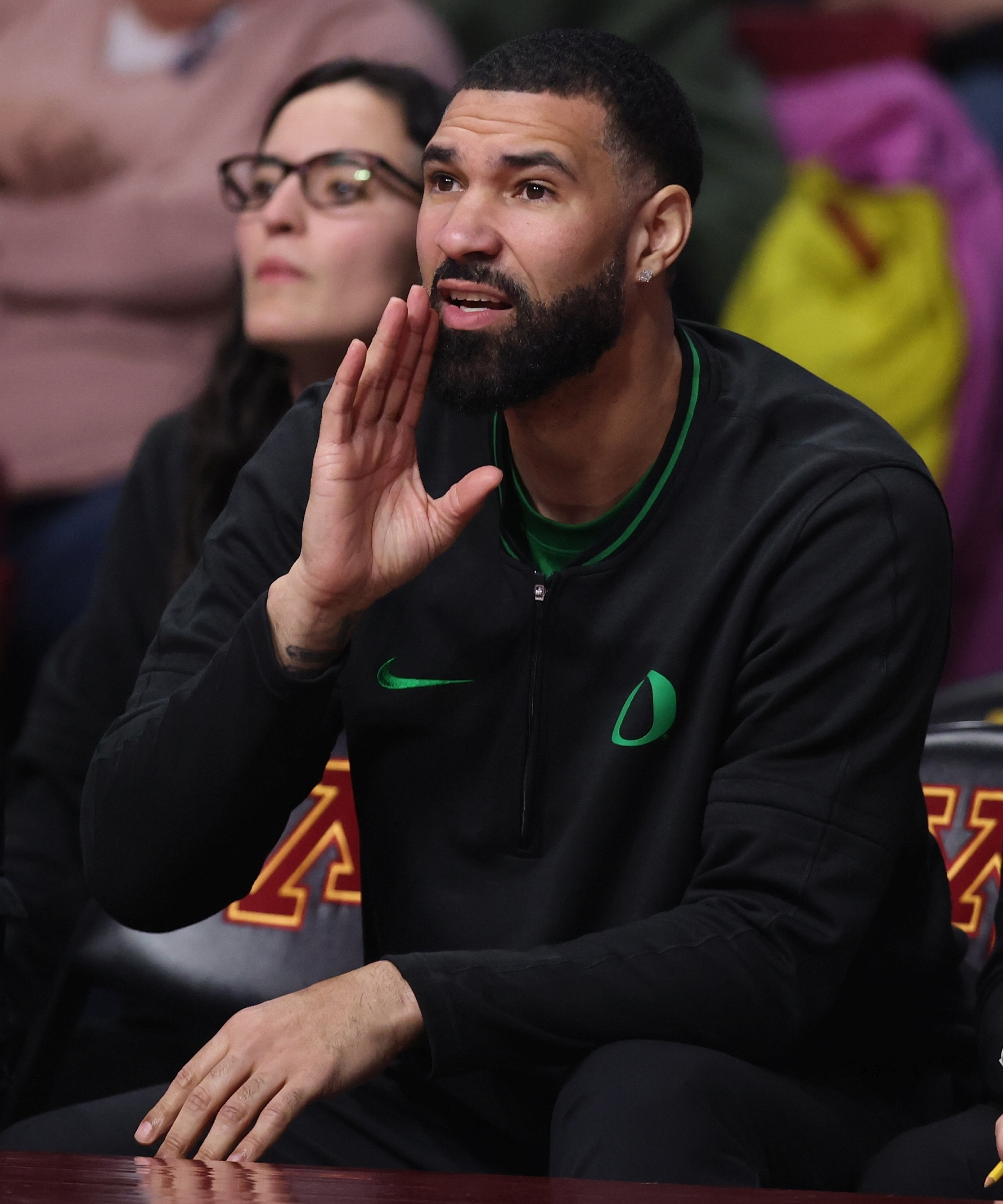
- Simmons as a coach with Oregon in 2025

Oregon Ducks
- Title: Assistant coach
- Conference: Big Ten

Personal information
- Born: July 24, 1982 (age 44) Seattle, Washington, U.S.
- Listed height: 6 ft 5 in (1.96 m)
- Listed weight: 206 lb (93 kg)

Career information
- High school: Garfield (Seattle, Washigthon)
- College: Odessa (2001–2002); Green River CC (2002–2003); Washington (2003–2005)
- NBA draft: 2005: undrafted
- Playing career: 2005–2018
- Position: Shooting guard / small forward

Career history

Playing
- 2005–2006: PAOK
- 2006–2007: Gran Canaria
- 2007: Hapoel Galil Elyon
- 2007–2008: Hapoel Holon
- 2008–2009: Maccabi Tel Aviv
- 2009–2010: Hapoel Jerusalem
- 2010–2012: ČEZ Nymburk
- 2012–2013: Krasnye Krylya Samara
- 2013–2015: ČEZ Nymburk
- 2015: Cangrejeros de Santurce
- 2015–2016: Hapoel Tel Aviv
- 2016: Antibes Sharks
- 2017–2018: Hapoel Afula

Coaching
- 2023–present: Oregon (assistant)

Career highlights
- 2× Israeli Super League champion (2008, 2009); Israeli Supercup MVP (2009); 2× Czech NBL champion (2011, 2012); 2× Czech Cup winner (2011, 2012); Russian Cup winner (2013); EuroChallenge champion (2013); EuroChallenge Final Four MVP (2013); First-team All-Pac-10 (2005)

Chester Simmons III (born July 24, 1982), better known as Tre Simmons, is an American former professional basketball player and current coach. He played college basketball for Odessa, Green River CC and Washington before playing professionally in Greece, Spain, Israel, Czech Republic, Russia, Puerto Rico and France. Simmons was named EuroChallenge Final Four MVP in 2013.

== College career ==
Simmons played college basketball at Odessa College, Green River Community College and the University of Washington. He was named to the 2004–05 season's All-Pac-10 First Team.

== Professional career ==
Simmons began his professional career in 2006 when he joined the Greek League club PAOK. He then moved to the Spanish League and ULEB Cup club Gran Canaria for the 2006–07 season, but in the middle of the season moved to Israel and signed for the Superleague club Hapoel Galil Elyon. The following season he moved to Hapoel Holon with whom he won the league championship.

He joined the Euroleague club Maccabi Tel Aviv for the 2008–09 season. For the 2009–10 season he signed with Hapoel Jerusalem. From 2010 to 2012 he played for ČEZ Nymburk in Czech Republic where he won Czech National Championship and the Czech National Cup. In June 2012 he signed with Krasnye Krylya Samara of Russia for the 2012–13 season. In July 2013, he returned to ČEZ Nymburk. On May 29, 2015, he signed with Cangrejeros de Santurce of Puerto Rico for the 2015 BSN season.

On November 29, 2015, he signed with Hapoel Tel Aviv.

On August 26, 2016, he signed with French club Antibes Sharks.

On December 18, 2017, he returned to Israel for a third stint, signing with Hapoel Afula of the Liga Leumit for the rest of the season. One day later, he made his debut in a 94–92 win over Maccabi Hod HaSharon, recording 22 points, four assists and four rebounds.

On November 8, 2018, he announced his retirement from playing professional basketball.

== Coaching career ==
On July 25, 2023, Simmons was hired to join Kelly Graves staff as an assistant coach for the Oregon Ducks women's basketball team.
