= Adam Chubb =

American basketball player (born 1981)

Personal information
- Born: July 5, 1981 (age 45) Harrisburg, Pennsylvania, U.S.
- Listed height: 6 ft 10 in (2.08 m)

Career information
- High school: Mercersburg Academy (Mercersburg, Pennsylvania) Susquehanna Township High School (Harrisburg, Pennsylvania)
- College: Penn (2000–2004)
- NBA draft: 2004: undrafted
- Playing career: 2004–2016
- Position: Center / power forward
- Number: 11

Career history
- 2004–2005: Ulsan Mobis Phoebus
- 2005–2006: Gießen 46ers
- 2006–2007: Eisbären Bremerhaven
- 2007–2008: Artland Dragons
- 2008–2010: Alba Berlin
- 2010–2011: Basket Zaragoza 2002
- 2011–2015: EWE Baskets Oldenburg
- 2015–2016: Crailsheim Merlins

Career highlights
- All-Bundesliga Second Team (2013)

Adam Edward Chubb (born July 5, 1981) is an American former basketball player.

Chubb was born in Harrisburg, Pennsylvania. He attended the Wharton School at the University of Pennsylvania where he was a dual athlete: basketball and track and field. Chubb held the University of Pennsylvania high jump record at 7 ft 2.5 in (2.197 m) from 2001 until it was broken by Maalik Reynolds (7 ft 5.75 in (2.280 m)) in 2011.

After college, he went on to have a successful, 12-season professional basketball career in Asia and Europe. During his career, Chubb won the German Basketball Cup three times (2008, 2009, 2015), and was a Eurocup runner-up in 2010 with Alba Berlin. Chubb was MVP of the German Basketball Cup (2008) with the Artland Dragons. Also, Chubb was a three-time German League All-Star Team member (2008, 2012, 2014).

Chubb is 14th in all-time points, 7th in all-time rebounds, and 6th in all-time blocked shots in the German Bundesliga.

Chubb now resides in Charleston, South Carolina with his family. He is owner and managing partner of www.pinnaclelifellc.com where he helps families and small businesses plan for the future through life insurance, disability insurance and long-term care insurance.
