= BC Krasnye Krylia =

- Founded: 2009
- Dissolved: 2015
- History: BC Krasnye Krylia; 2009–2015
- Arena: MTL Arena
- Capacity: 2,200
- Location: Samara, Russia
- Team colors: Red, White
- President: Vladislav Kapustin
- Championships: 1 EuroChallenge; 2 Russian Cups
- Website: bcred.ru
Home	Away

BC Krasnye Krylya (Russian: БК Красные Крылья, English: BC Red Wings) was a Russian professional basketball club from the city of Samara, Russia.

== History ==
Krasnye Krylya played in the 2009–10 season of the Russian Super League 1, as a replacement for the bankrupt club, CSK VVS, that is also from Samara.

After the 2014–15 season, BC Krasnye Krylia withdrew from the VTB United League, because it didn't fulfill arena requirements.

== Roster ==
BC Krasnye Krylya Samara Region roster
Players
Coaches

Pos.	No.	Nat.	Name	Ht.	Wt.	Age
G	5	(Russia)	Zuev, Vitaly	1.86 m (6 ft 1 in)	83 kg (183 lb)	36 – 3 December 1989
G	7	(Russia)	Zaryazhko, Victor	1.94 m (6 ft 4 in)	88 kg (194 lb)	33 – 29 September 1992
C	10	(Russia)	Vasiliev, Yury	2.07 m (6 ft 9 in)	103 kg (227 lb)	45 – 8 January 1981
C	21	(Russia)	Fedorchuk, Alexey	2.10 m (6 ft 11 in)	100 kg (220 lb)	39 – 20 November 1986

Head coach

- (Russia) Bazarevich Sergey

Assistant coach(es)

Russel Bergman

- (Russia) Denis Godlevskiy
- (Kazakhstan) Rinat Abitov

Legend

- (C) Team captain
- Injured

- Roster
Updated: 2013-05-20

== Trophies ==
- EuroChallenge
  - Champions (1): 2012–13
  - Runner-up (1): 2009–10
- Russian Cup
  - Champions (2): 2011–12, 2012–13

== Season by season ==
Season	Tier	League	Pos.	Russian Cup	European competitions		
2009–10	1	PBL	8th		3 EuroChallenge	RU	12–4
2010–11	1	PBL	8th		2 Eurocup	RS	2–4
2011–12	1	PBL	8th	Winner			
2011–12	1	United League	6th	Winner			
2012–13	1	PBL	7th	Winner	3 EuroChallenge	C	16–0
2012–13	1	United League	5th	Winner	3 EuroChallenge	C	16–0
2013–14	1	United League	5th		3 EuroChallenge	QF	8–6
2014–15	1	United League	16th				

== Notable players ==
Note: Flags indicate national team eligibility at FIBA-sanctioned events. Players may hold other non-FIBA nationalities not displayed.

Criteria

To appear in this section a player must have either:

- Set a club record or won an individual award while at the club
- Played at least one official international match for their national team at any time
- Played at least one official NBA match at any time.

- (United States) Gerald Green 1 season: 2010–11
- (United States) DeJuan Blair 1 season: 2011
- (United States) Brion Rush 2 seasons: 2010–12
- (United States) Tre Simmons 1 season: 2012–13

== Head coaches ==
- (Russia) Stanislav Yeryomin 1 season: 2010–2011
- (Russia) Sergei Bazarevich 3 seasons: 2011–2014
