= Pavel Pumprla =

Czech basketball player (born 1986)

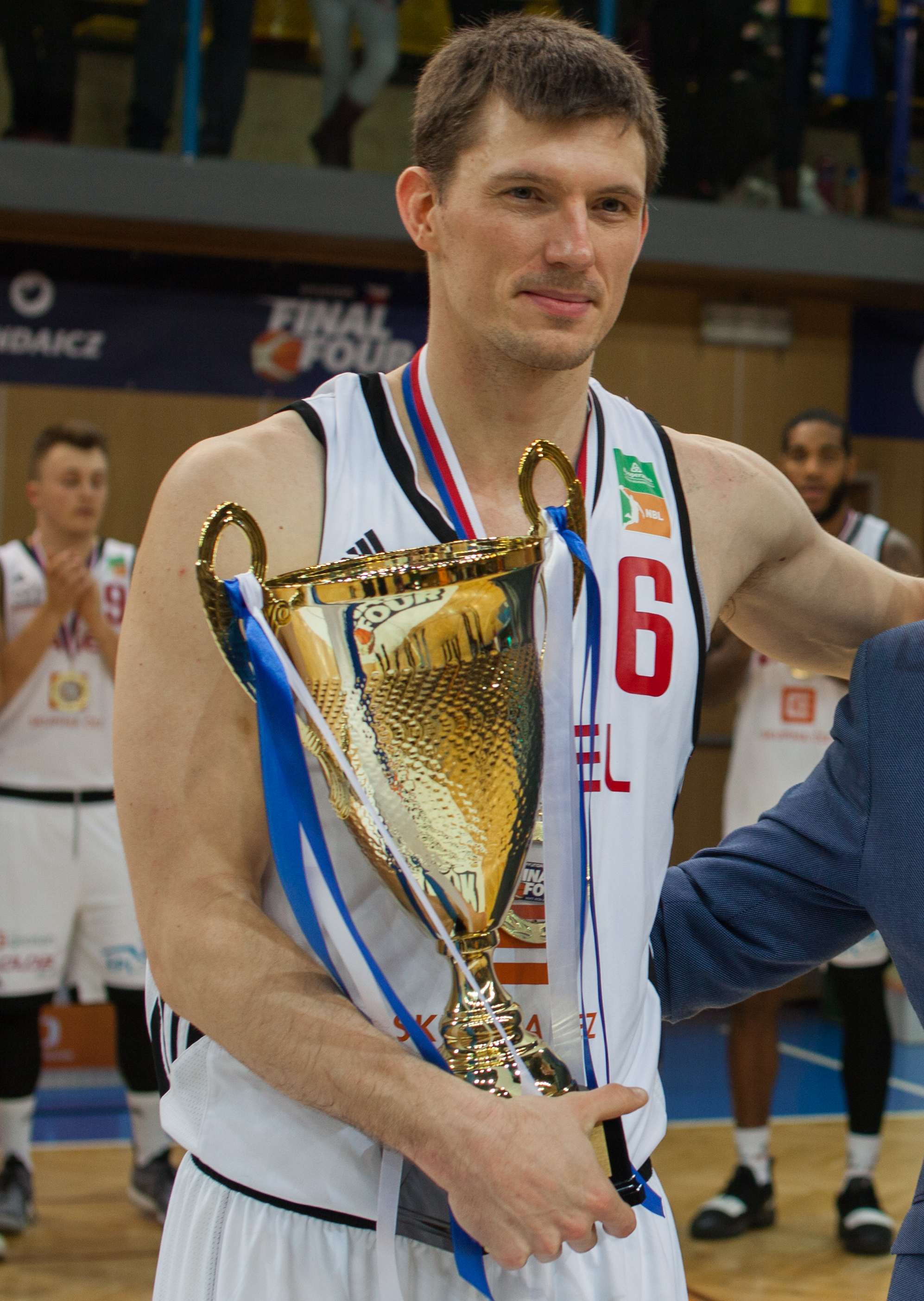
- Pumprla with Nymburk in 2017

No. 6 – Slavia Prague
- Position: Shooting guard / small forward
- League: Czech NBL

Personal information
- Born: 13 June 1986 (age 40) Zábřeh, Czechoslovakia
- Listed height: 6 ft 6 in (1.98 m)
- Listed weight: 200.2 lb (91 kg)

Career information
- NBA draft: 2008: undrafted
- Playing career: 2005–present

Career history
- 2005–2006: Prostějov
- 2006–2007: BK Olomouc
- 2007–2009: Opava
- 2009–2012: Nymburk
- 2012–2015: Obradoiro CAB
- 2015–2016: Spirou
- 2016: Estudiantes
- 2016–2020: Nymburk
- 2020–present: Slavia Prague

Career highlights
- All-EuroCup Second Team (2012); 7× Czech League champion (2010–2012, 2017–2020); 7× Czech Cup winner (2010–2012, 2017–2020)

Pavel Pumprla (born 13 June 1986) is a Czech professional basketball player for Slavia Prague of the Czech NBL. He also represents the senior Czech Republic national team.

== Professional career ==
While playing with the Czech Republic club Basketball Nymburk, Pumprla was named to the European-wide secondary level EuroCup's All-EuroCup Second Team in 2012. In August 2012, he signed with the Spanish League club Obradoiro CAB, for the 2012–13 season. In April 2013, he re-signed with them for one more season.

On 8 October 2015, he signed with the Belgian League club Spirou Charleroi. On February 10, 2016, he left Charleroi, and signed with the Spanish club Estudiantes, for the rest of the season. On 19 August 2016, Pumprla returned to ČEZ Nymburk. After four seasons with the team, he signed with the Czech club Slavia Prague, on August 21, 2020.

== National team career ==
Pumprla has been a member of the senior Czech national team. He played with the Czech Republic at the 2013 EuroBasket, the 2015 EuroBasket, the 2016 Belgrade FIBA World Olympic Qualifying Tournament, and the 2019 FIBA World Cup.
