= 2019–20 National Basketball League (Czech Republic) season =

Kooperativa NBL
- Season: 2019–20
- Duration: 5 October 2019 – 18 March 2020 (Note: The season was ended prematurely on 13 March 2020 due to the COVID-19 pandemic. As such, Nymburk were named champions based on standings at that time.)
- Teams: 12

Finals
- Champions: ERA Nymburk (17th title) (Note: The season was ended prematurely on 13 March 2020 due to the COVID-19 pandemic. As such, Nymburk were named champions based on standings at that time.)
- Runners-up: Opava

The 2019–20 National Basketball League (Czech Republic) season was the 27th season of the Czech NBL. ERA Nymburk achieved their 17th consecutive title after the league ended prematurely on 18 March 2020 due to the COVID-19 pandemic.

== Format ==
Teams in regular season play home and away against every other team in a round-robin tournament, before being split into two groups of six teams for playing again home and away against the teams from the same group.

After the end of the stage after the first split, the six teams from to top group and the two first qualified teams from the bottom group joined the play-offs.

The other four teams would play again home and away against themselves for avoiding the relegation.

== Teams ==
Location of teams in the 2018–19 NBL

Team	City	Venue
Armex Děčín	Děčín	ARMEX Sportcentrum
ERA Nymburk	Nymburk	Sportovní Centrum
Dekstone Tuři Svitavy	Svitavy	Na Střelnici
Geosan Kolín	Kolín	Hala SOU Spojů
JIP Pardubice	Pardubice	Sportovní hala Dašická
Kingspan Královští sokoli	Hradec Králové	
mmcité1 Brno	Brno	Hala Míč
NH Ostrava	Ostrava	Bonver Aréna
Opava	Opava	Hala Opava
Olomoucko	Prostějov	Sportcentrum - DDM
Sluneta	Ústí nad Labem	Sportovni Hala Klise
USK Praha	Prague	Hala Folimanka

== Regular season ==
=== League table ===
Pos	Team	Pld	W	L	PF	PA	PD	PCT	Qualification
1	ERA Nymburk	22	22	0	2214	1612	+602	1.000	Qualification to group A1
2	Opava	22	17	5	1904	1672	+232	.773	Qualification to group A1
3	Dekstone Tuři Svitavy	22	16	6	1919	1783	+136	.727	Qualification to group A1
4	JIP Pardubice	22	13	9	1751	1662	+89	.591	Qualification to group A1
5	Sluneta	22	12	10	1795	1872	−77	.545	Qualification to group A1
6	Olomoucko	22	12	10	1912	1825	+87	.545	Qualification to group A1
7	USK Praha	22	11	11	1804	1799	+5	.500	Qualification to group A1
8	Armex Děčín	22	10	12	1782	1800	−18	.455	Qualification to group A1
9	Kingspan Královští sokoli	22	6	16	1810	2052	−242	.273	Qualification to group A2
10	NH Ostrava	22	6	16	1791	2106	−315	.273	Qualification to group A2
11	Geosan Kolín	22	4	18	1773	2038	−265	.182	Qualification to group A2
12	mmcité Brno	22	3	19	1660	1894	−234	.136	Qualification to group A2

Source: NBL

=== Results ===
Home \ Away	DEC	TUR	NYM	KOL	PAR	KRA	BRN	OST	OLO	OPA	SLU	USK
Armex Děčín	—	98–96	69–86	106–72	77–70	98–70	68–66	100–76	94–98	63–87	81–82	82–84
Dekstone Tuři Svitavy	86–66	—	70–97	91–81	80–74	102–83	94–73	108–96	85–82	90–70	78–67	78–70
ERA Nymburk	102–84	98–76	—	114–75	88–52	102–65	116–70	95–81	106–67	92–75	112–76	99–78
Geosan Kolín	75–91	69–82	75–106	—	84–105	87–74	76–87	92–89	82–58	67–96	90–93	94–86
JIP Pardubice	84–69	78–77	61–85	94–82	—	106–71	91–65	93–62	63–83	73–87	67–65	91–81
Kingspan Královští sokoli	69–70	102–107	80–117	108–97	68–89	—	78–76	92–72	97–112	82–104	90–106	95–85
mmcité1 Brno	79–82	82–83	71–101	73–82	80–75	82–98	—	83–85	63–72	64–90	88–91	94–82
NH Ostrava	71–78	75–105	84–111	101–89	66–115	89–98	99–89	—	97–92	72–107	91–86	78–100
Olomoucko	91–87	85–92	70–106	104–77	82–69	93–70	84–69	109–62	—	85–90	104–61	90–77
Opava	87–70	85–79	76–91	99–71	85–65	95–68	83–68	84–76	94–77	—	94–70	92–68
Sluneta	73–71	69–76	77–100	86–79	67–73	81–78	88–79	107–100	100–97	93–66	—	74–80
USK Praha	96–78	93–84	80–90	95–87	58–63	82–74	76–59	83–79	84–77	88–58	78–83	—

Source: NBL.cz
Legend: Blue = home team win; Red = away team win.

== Group A1 ==
=== League table ===
Pos	Team	Pld	W	L	PF	PA	PD	PCT	Qualification
1	ERA Nymburk (C)	28	28	0	2801	2102	+699	1.000	Qualification to Basketball Champions League
2	Opava	28	20	8	2406	2185	+221	.714	
3	Dekstone Tuři Svitavy	28	19	9	2476	2333	+143	.679	
4	Sluneta	28	16	12	2329	2412	−83	.571	
5	Olomoucko	28	15	13	2431	2344	+87	.536	
6	JIP Pardubice	28	15	13	2258	2183	+75	.536	
7	USK Praha	28	13	15	2315	2325	−10	.464	
8	Armex Děčín	28	11	17	2280	2356	−76	.393	

Updated to match(es) played on 8 March 2020. Source: NBL
(C) Champions

=== Results ===
Home \ Away	DEC	TUR	NYM	PAR	OLO	OPA	SLU	USK
Armex Děčín	—	78–98	81–93	87–73				
Dekstone Tuři Svitavy		—				116–108	115–78	76–94
ERA Nymburk		100–83	—	109–87			102–78	
JIP Pardubice				—	96–90	97–65		77–79
Olomoucko	103–92	92–69	73–90		—	70–86		
Opava	91–77					—		82–71
Sluneta	98–83			91–77		82–70	—	107–93
USK Praha			88–93		86–91			—

Updated to match(es) played on 11 March 2020. Source: NBL
Legend: Blue = home team win; Red = away team win.

== Group A2 ==
=== League table ===
Pos	Team	Pld	W	L	PF	PA	PD	PCT
1	mmcité1 Brno	27	8	19	2078	2254	−176	.296
2	Kingspan Královští sokoli	27	8	19	2204	2445	−241	.296
3	NH Ostrava	27	8	19	2201	2541	−340	.296
4	Geosan Kolín	27	5	22	2179	2478	−299	.185

Updated to match(es) played on 7 March 2020. Source: NBL

=== Results ===
Home \ Away	KOL	KRA	BRN	OST	KOL	KRA	BRN	OST
Geosan Kolín	—	66–82	77–78	106–92	—			
Kingspan Královští sokoli	91–68	—	76–85			—		
mmcité1 Brno		89–71	—	86–59			—	
NH Ostrava	97–89	85–74	77–80	—				—

Updated to match(es) played on 7 March 2020. Source: NBL
Legend: Blue = home team win; Red = away team win.

== Czech clubs in European competitions ==
Team	Competition	Progress
ERA Nymburk	Champions League	Quarterfinals

== Czech clubs in international competitions ==
Team	Competition	Progress
Opava	Alpe Adria Cup	Quarterfinals
JIP Pardubice	Alpe Adria Cup	Final
Sluneta Ústí nad Labem	Alpe Adria Cup	Quarterfinals
Armex Děčín	Alpe Adria Cup	Final
mmcité1 Brno	Alpe Adria Cup	Regular season
