= Alex Davis (basketball) =

American basketball player (born 1992)

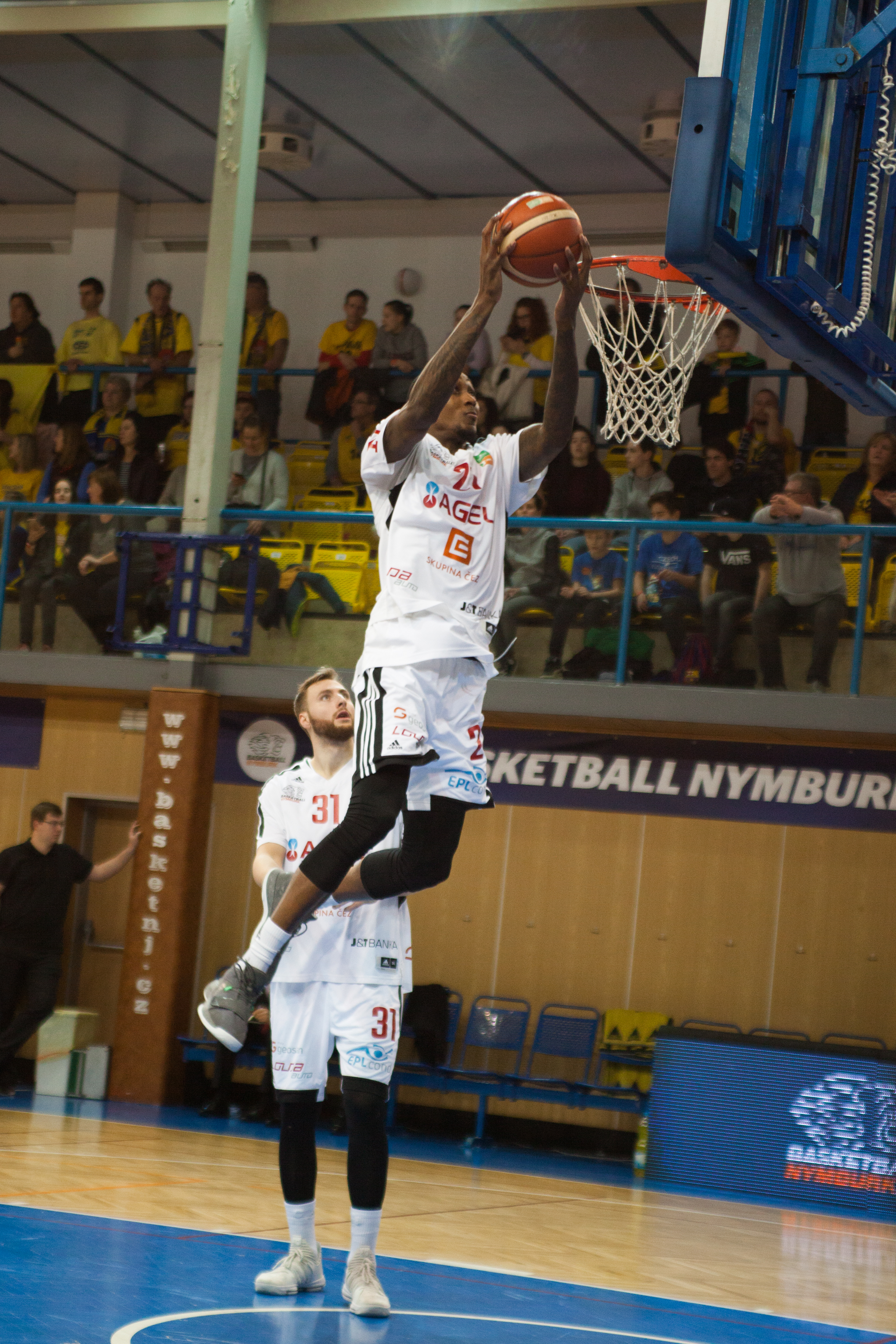
- Davis with Nymburk in 2019

No. 9 – Kagawa Five Arrows
- Position: Power forward / center
- League: B3 League

Personal information
- Born: January 28, 1992 (age 34) Houston, Texas, U.S.
- Listed height: 6 ft 9 in (2.06 m)
- Listed weight: 219 lb (99 kg)

Career information
- High school: Yates (Houston, Texas)
- College: Hutchinson CC (2011–2013); Fresno State (2013–2015)
- NBA draft: 2015: undrafted
- Playing career: 2015–present

Career history
- 2015–2017: Erie BayHawks
- 2017: Northern Arizona Suns
- 2017: Beroe
- 2017–2019: Nymburk
- 2019–2020: Iraklis Thessaloniki
- 2020–2022: Akita Northern Happinets
- 2022–2023: Aomori Wat's
- 2023–2024: Altiri Chiba
- 2024–present: Kagawa Five Arrows

Career highlights
- 2× Czech League champion (2018, 2019); 2× Czech Cup winner (2018, 2019); 2× B.League Blocks Leader (2021, 2022)

Alex Davis (born January 28, 1992) is an American professional basketball player for the Kagawa Five Arrows of the B3 League. After two years of college basketball at Hutchinson Community College and two years at Fresno State Davis entered the 2015 NBA draft but was not selected in the draft's two rounds.

== High school career ==
Davis played high school basketball at Yates High School, in Houston, Texas.

== College career ==
During his college career, Davis attended Hutchinson Community College. With Hutchinson, he won the Region VI championship in 2013. After two years with the Blue Dragons, he was transferred to Fresno State, where he stayed until 2015.

== College statistics ==
Year	Team	GP	GS	MPG	FG%	3P%	FT%	RPG	APG	SPG	BPG	PPG
2013–14	Fresno State	38	31	25.0	.482	.250	.590	3.71	0.68	0.55	1.89	5.84
2014–15	Fresno State	25	12	24.0	.467	.000	.704	3.92	0.52	0.68	0.88	4.88
Career		63	43	24.6	.476	.182	.629	3.79	0.62	0.60	1.49	5.46

== Professional career ==
After going undrafted in the 2015 NBA draft, Davis was acquired from Erie BayHawks of the NBA Development League. He spent one and a half season with the BayHawks, before being traded to the Northern Arizona Suns on January 31, 2017.

On August 21, 2019, he joined Iraklis Thessaloniki of the Greek Basket League. Davis averaged 11.2 points and 5.4 rebounds per game. On July 16, 2020, he was signed by Akita Northern Happinets of the Japanese B.League. He became the second player in Happinets history to lead the league in blocks in 2021 and 2022.

On June 14, 2024, Davis signed with the Kagawa Five Arrows of the B3 League.

== Career statistics ==
Legend
GP	Games played	GS	Games started	MPG	Minutes per game
FG%	Field goal percentage	3P%	3-point field goal percentage	FT%	Free throw percentage
RPG	Rebounds per game	APG	Assists per game	SPG	Steals per game
BPG	Blocks per game	PPG	Points per game	**Bold**	Career high

=== NBA Summer League ===
Year	Team	GP	GS	MPG	FG%	3P%	FT%	RPG	APG	SPG	BPG	PPG
2016–17	ORL	5	1	20.0	.571	.000	.600	3.00	0.40	0.60	1.00	5.40

=== Regular season ===
†	Denotes seasons in which Davis won an championship
*	Led the league

Year	Team	GP	GS	MPG	FG%	3P%	FT%	RPG	APG	SPG	BPG	PPG
2015–16	ERI	50	42	26.8	.465	.000	.778	5.26	0.86	0.62	1.26	8.64
2016–17	ERI/NAS	51	39	24.6	.455	.395	.685	4.84	0.92	0.65	1.53	7.82
2017–18†	Beroe/Nymburk	50	9	18.1	.582	.412	.717	5.12	0.96	0.66	1.12	9.18
2018–19†	Nymburk	51	21	16.9	.548	.485	.591	4.37	1.02	0.63	0.69	7.96
2019–20	Iraklis	20	12	23.7	.621	.500	.606	5.40	0.80	0.80	1.35	11.20
2020–21	Akita	54	46	27.6	.577	.186	.587	7.4	2.2	1.8	2.2*	11.9

== Awards and accomplishments ==
=== Club ===
Nymburk

- 2× National Basketball League: (2018, 2019)
- 2× Czech Cup: (2018, 2019)

=== Individual ===
- 2× B.League Blocks Leader: (2021, 2022)
