= 2023–24 National Basketball League (Czech Republic) season =

Kooperativa NBL
- Season: 2023–24
- Teams: 12

The 2023–24 National Basketball League (Czech Republic) season was the 31st season of the Czech NBL.

Opava is defending champion.

== Format ==
Teams in regular season play home and away against every other team in a round-robin tournament, before being split into two groups of six teams for playing again home and away against the teams from the same group.

After the end of the stage after the first split, the six teams from to top group and the two first qualified teams from the bottom group joined the play-offs.

The other four teams would play again home and away against themselves for avoiding the relegation.

== Teams ==
Location of teams in the 2023–24 NBL

Team	City	Venue
Armex Děčín	Děčín	ARMEX Sportcentrum
Basket Brno	Brno	Hala Míč
ERA Nymburk	Nymburk	Sportovní Centrum
Geosan Kolín	Kolín	Hala SOU Spojů
KVIS Pardubice	Pardubice	Sportovní hala Dašická
NH Ostrava	Ostrava	Bonver Aréna
Opava	Opava	Hala Opava
Olomoucko	Prostějov	Sportcentrum - DDM
Slavia Praha	Prague	
Sluneta	Ústí nad Labem	Sportovni Hala Klise
Srsni Pisek		
USK Praha	Prague	Hala Folimanka

== Regular season ==
=== League table ===
Pos	Team	Pld	W	L	PF	PA	PD	PCT	Qualification
1	ČEZ Nymburk	22	17	5	2038	1552	+486	.773	Qualification to group A1
2	Opava	22	17	5	2008	1818	+190	.773	Qualification to group A1
3	Sluneta	22	14	8	1983	1828	+155	.636	Qualification to group A1
4	Armex Děčín	22	13	9	1905	1799	+106	.591	Qualification to group A1
5	egoé Brno	22	12	10	1686	1736	−50	.545	Qualification to group A1
6	USK Praha	22	11	11	1650	1678	−28	.500	Qualification to group A1
7	JIP Pardubice	22	11	11	1836	1892	−56	.500	Qualification to group A1
8	Geosan Kolín	22	11	11	1769	1859	−90	.500	Qualification to group A1
9	NH Ostrava	22	8	14	1681	1794	−113	.364	Qualification to group A2
10	Srsni Pisek	22	8	14	1892	2003	−111	.364	Qualification to group A2
11	Olomoucko	22	7	15	1778	1920	−142	.318	Qualification to group A2
12	Slavia Praha	22	3	19	1683	2030	−347	.136	Qualification to group A2

Source: NBL

== Czech clubs in European competitions ==
Team	Competition	Progress
Opava	Champions League	Regular season
ERA Nymburk	FIBA Europe Cup	Regular season
KVIS Pardubice	FIBA Europe Cup	Qualifying round

== Czech clubs in international competitions ==
Team	Competition	Progress
Sluneta Ústí nad Labem	Alpe Adria Cup	
Geosan Kolín	Alpe Adria Cup	
Olomoucko	Alpe Adria Cup	
Basket Brno	ENBL	
