= Jiří Welsch =

Czech basketball player (born 1980)

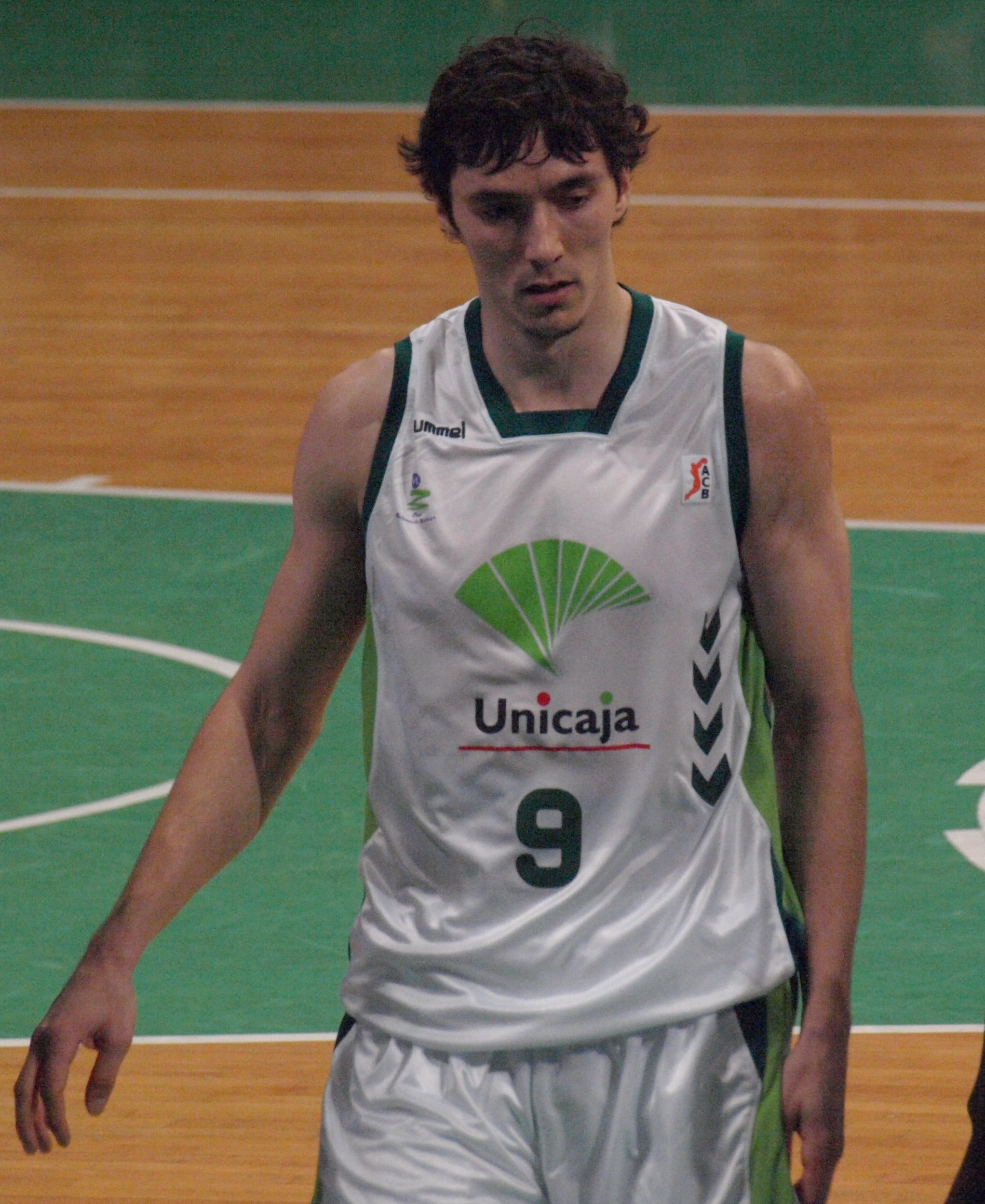
- Welsch with Unicaja Málaga in 2009

Personal information
- Born: 27 January 1980 (age 46) Pardubice, Czechoslovakia
- Listed height: 6 ft 7 in (2.01 m)
- Listed weight: 210 lb (95 kg)

Career information
- NBA draft: 2002: 1st round, 16th overall pick
- Drafted by: Philadelphia 76ers
- Playing career: 1997–2018
- Position: Shooting guard / small forward
- Number: 4, 44, 9

Career history
- 1997–1998: BK JIP Pardubice
- 1998–2000: Sparta Prague
- 2000–2002: Union Olimpija
- 2002–2003: Golden State Warriors
- 2003–2005: Boston Celtics
- 2005: Cleveland Cavaliers
- 2005–2006: Milwaukee Bucks
- 2006–2010: Unicaja Málaga
- 2010–2011: Estudiantes
- 2011–2012: Spirou Charleroi
- 2012–2017: ČEZ Nymburk
- 2017–2018: BK Pardubice

Career highlights
- Adriatic League champion (2002); 3× Czech Player of the Year (2000, 2005, 2006); 3× Czech League champion (2013–2015); 2× Czech Cup winner (2013, 2014); Slovenian League champion (2001); 2× Slovenian Cup winner (2001, 2002); Slovenian Cup MVP (2002)
- Stats at NBA.com
- Stats at Basketball Reference

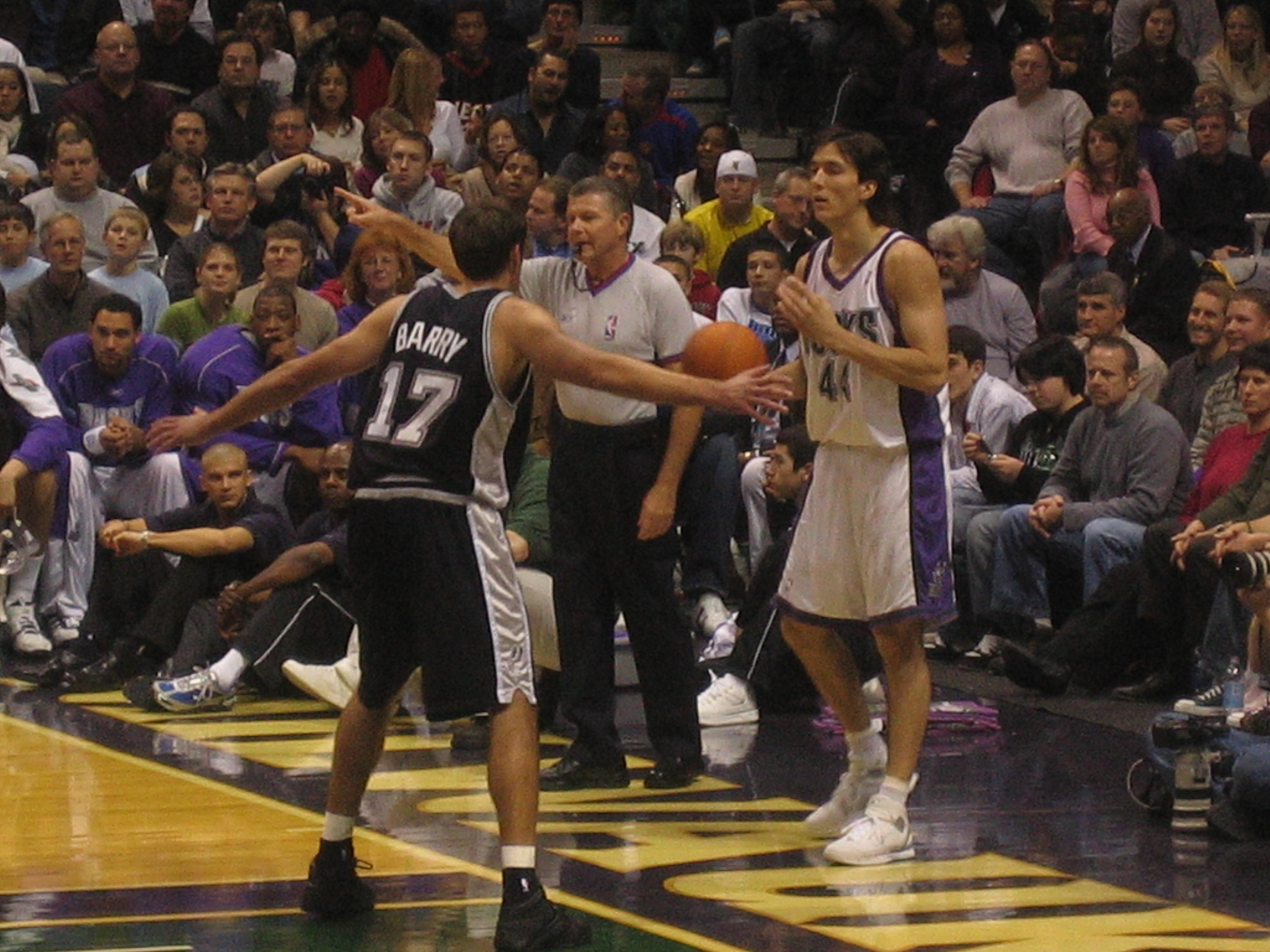
Welsch (right) with the Milwaukee Bucks in 2005, defended by Brent Barry

Jiří Welsch (Czech pronunciation: [ˈjɪr̝iː ˈvɛlʃ]) (born 27 January 1980) is a Czech former professional basketball player who played in the National Basketball Association (NBA) from 2002 to 2006 with the Golden State Warriors, Boston Celtics, Cleveland Cavaliers, and Milwaukee Bucks. He was selected by the Philadelphia 76ers in the first round of the 2002 NBA draft.

== Professional career ==
=== Early years ===
Welsch began his professional career as a teenager with BK JIP Pardubice of the Czech Republic League, where he played until 1998. He then signed with CSA Sparta Prague of the Czech Republic League for the 1998–99 season, and then he moved to Union Olimpija Ljubljana of the Slovenian League, where he played until 2002. He was named the Slovenian League Most Valuable Player following the 2001–02 season campaign.

=== NBA ===
Welsch was drafted by the NBA's Philadelphia 76ers with the 16th selection of the 2002 NBA draft, but he was immediately traded to the Golden State Warriors for a future first-round draft pick and a future first- or second-round draft pick. He spent one season with the Warriors, averaging 1.6 points per game, 0.8 rebounds per game, and 0.7 assists per game in 37 games in the 2002–03 season before he was traded to the Dallas Mavericks, along with Antawn Jamison, Chris Mills and Danny Fortson, in exchange for Evan Eschmeyer, Nick Van Exel, Avery Johnson, Popeye Jones and Antoine Rigaudeau on 18 August 2003. Without ever playing a game for them, Welsch, along with Mills, Raef LaFrentz and a lottery-protected 2004 NBA draft pick, was traded by Dallas to the Boston Celtics on 20 October 2003 in exchange for Antoine Walker and Tony Delk. Welsch started 68 games for the Celtics in the 2003–04 season, averaging 9.2 points per game.

Welsch averaged 8.5 points, 3.2 rebounds, and 2.0 assists per game in 136 games played (100 of them starts) in 2003–04 and 2004–05, while playing with the Celtics. On 24 February 2005, Welsch was traded to the Cleveland Cavaliers for a future 2007 first-round draft pick.

On 28 June 2005, Welsch was traded by the Cavs to the Milwaukee Bucks for a 2006 second-round draft pick.

Welsch's final NBA game was played in Game 5 of the 2006 Eastern Conference First Round on 3 May 2006, against the Detroit Pistons. The Bucks would lose the game 93–122 and drop the series to Detroit 4–1, with Welsch recording 2 points, 1 assist and 1 rebound.

=== Back to Europe ===
In August 2006, Welsch decided to leave the NBA, and he signed with the Spanish ACB league club Unicaja Málaga. After playing with Estudiantes Madrid, he signed a contract with Spirou Basket, of Belgium, in July 2011. In 2012, he signed with ČEZ Nymburk. He joined BK Pardubice in 2017.

== National team career ==
Welsch has been a member of the senior Czech Republic national basketball team. He played at the following EuroBasket tournaments: the 1999 EuroBasket, the 2007 EuroBasket, the 2013 EuroBasket, the 2015 EuroBasket, and the 2017 EuroBasket.

== Career statistics ==
Legend
| GP | Games played | GS | Games started | MPG | Minutes per game |
| FG% | Field goal percentage | 3P% | 3-point field goal percentage | FT% | Free throw percentage |
| RPG | Rebounds per game | APG | Assists per game | SPG | Steals per game |
| BPG | Blocks per game | PPG | Points per game | **Bold** | Career high |

=== NBA ===
==== Regular season ====
| Year | Team | GP | GS | MPG | FG% | 3P% | FT% | RPG | APG | SPG | BPG | PPG |
|---|---|---|---|---|---|---|---|---|---|---|---|---|
| 2002–03 | Golden State | 37 | 0 | 6.3 | .253 | .250 | .759 | .8 | .7 | .2 | **.1** | 1.6 |
| 2003–04 | Boston | **81** | **68** | **26.9** | **.428** | **.381** | .743 | **3.7** | **2.3** | **1.2** | **.1** | **9.2** |
| 2004–05 | Boston | 55 | 32 | 20.5 | **.428** | .323 | **.773** | 2.5 | 1.5 | .7 | **.1** | 7.5 |
| 2004–05 | Cleveland | 16 | 0 | 12.0 | .235 | .182 | .714 | 1.8 | 1.2 | .3 | .0 | 2.9 |
| 2005–06 | Milwaukee | 58 | 2 | 14.9 | .387 | .286 | .747 | 1.9 | 1.1 | .6 | .0 | 4.3 |
| Career | | 247 | 102 | 18.6 | .403 | .343 | .752 | 2.4 | 1.5 | .8 | .1 | 6.1 |

==== Playoffs ====
| Year | Team | GP | GS | MPG | FG% | 3P% | FT% | RPG | APG | SPG | BPG | PPG |
|---|---|---|---|---|---|---|---|---|---|---|---|---|
| 2003–04 | Boston | **4** | **4** | **26.0** | .478 | **.250** | **1.000** | **3.0** | **2.3** | **.5** | .0 | **8.0** |
| 2005–06 | Milwaukee | **4** | 0 | 3.8 | **.500** | .000 | .750 | .8 | .5 | .3 | .0 | 1.8 |
| Career | | 8 | 4 | 14.9 | .481 | .250 | .923 | 1.9 | 1.4 | .4 | .0 | 4.9 |
