= Tony Meier =

American basketball player (born 1990)

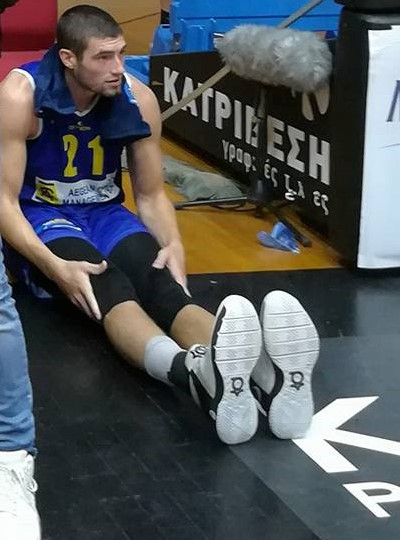
- Meier with Lavrio in 2018

Free agent
- Position: Power forward

Personal information
- Born: June 3, 1990 (age 36) Wildwood, Missouri, U.S.
- Listed height: 6 ft 8 in (2.03 m)
- Listed weight: 210 lb (95 kg)

Career information
- High school: Lafayette (Wildwood, Missouri)
- College: Milwaukee (2008–2012)
- NBA draft: 2012: undrafted
- Playing career: 2012–present

Career history
- 2013: Frankston Blues
- 2013–2014: Vitória de Guimarães
- 2014–2015: Starogard Gdański
- 2015–2016: Apollon Patras
- 2016–2017: ČEZ Nymburk
- 2017–2018: Lavrio
- 2018–2019: Promitheas Patras
- 2019–2022: Stelmet Zielona Góra
- 2022–2025: Wilki Morskie Szczecin

Career highlights
- PLK champion (2023); Czech League champion (2017); Czech Cup winner (2017)

Anthony Meier (born June 3, 1990) is an American basketball player who last played for Wilki Morskie Szczecin of the Polish Basketball League (PLK). After four years at the University of Wisconsin at Milwaukee, Meier entered the 2012 NBA draft but went undrafted.

== High school career ==
Meier played high school basketball at Lafayette High School, in Wildwood, Missouri.

== College career ==
Meier played college basketball at Milwaukee from 2008 to 2012. As a senior, he led the team in scoring, averaging 11.3 points. He also added 3.8 rebounds and 0.8 assists, while shooting with 39.5 percent from the three.

== Professional career ==
Meier's professional career started in the 2012–13 season with Frankston Blues of the South East Australian Basketball League. He left the club on May, after a season-ending ankle injury.

In 2013, he moved to LPB club Vitória. He appeared in 32 games for Vitória, averaging 14.9 points, 6.5 rebounds and 1.1 assists per game.

On September 20, 2014, he signed with Starogard Gdański.

On July 23, 2015, Meier signed a one-year deal with Apollon Patras of the Greek Basket League with a prospect of renewal for another year. He finished the season averaging 11.2 points and 3.9 rebounds per game.

On August 3, 2016, he joined ČEZ Nymburk. With Nymburk, he won the Czech League and the Czech Cup. The following year, he returned to Greece and signed with Lavrio, replacing Cole Huff on the team's squad. With Lavrio, he averaged 10.9 points and 3.7 rebounds per game.

On June 25, 2018, he joined Promitheas Patras of the Greek Basket League.

On August 22, 2019, he has signed with Stelmet Zielona Góra of the PLK. Meier averaged 11.2 points, 4 rebounds and 2.1 assists per game during the 2019-20 season. He re-signed with the team on June 23, 2020. However, he announced his retirement on July 26.

On June 14, 2021, he announced that he returned from retirement and has signed with his last club Basket Zielona Góra.

On July 26, 2022, he has signed with Wilki Morskie Szczecin of the Polish Basketball League (PLK).
