= 2018–19 NBL (Czech Republic) season =

Kooperativa NBL^{1}
- Season: 2018–19
- Duration: 26 September 2018 – May 2019
- Teams: 12

Finals
- Champions: ČEZ Nymburk; 16th title
- ^{1} Sponsored league name.

The 2018–19 National Basketball League (Czech Republic) season was the 26th season of the Czech NBL. ČEZ Nymburk achieved their 16th consecutive title, this time without losing any game in the whole season.

== Format ==
Teams in regular season play home and away against every other team in a round-robin tournament, before being split into two groups of six teams for playing again home and away against the teams from the same group.

After the end of the stage after the first split, the six teams from to top group and the two first qualified teams from the bottom group joined the play-offs.

The other four teams would play again home and away against themselves for avoiding the relegation.

== Teams ==
Location of teams in the 2017–18 NBL

Team	City	Venue
Armex Děčín	Děčín	ARMEX Sportcentrum
ČEZ Nymburk	Nymburk	Sportovní Centrum
Dekstone Tuři Svitavy	Svitavy	Na Střelnici
egoé Brno	Brno	Hala Míč
Geosan Kolín	Kolín	Hala SOU Spojů
JIP Pardubice	Pardubice	Sportovní hala Dašická
Kingspan Královští sokoli	Hradec Králové	
NH Ostrava	Ostrava	Bonver Aréna
Opava	Opava	Hala Opava
Olomoucko	Prostějov	Sportcentrum - DDM
Sluneta	Ústí nad Labem	Sportovni Hala Klise
USK Praha	Prague	Hala Folimanka

== Regular season ==
=== League table ===
Pos	Team	Pld	W	L	PF	PA	PD	PCT	Qualification
1	ČEZ Nymburk	22	22	0	2130	1603	+527	1.000	Qualification to group A1
2	Dekstone Tuři Svitavy	22	16	6	1890	1668	+222	.727	Qualification to group A1
3	Armex Děčín	22	14	8	1855	1780	+75	.636	Qualification to group A1
4	JIP Pardubice	22	13	9	1885	1769	+116	.591	Qualification to group A1
5	Olomoucko	22	13	9	1925	1820	+105	.591	Qualification to group A1
6	Sluneta	22	13	9	1815	1817	−2	.591	Qualification to group A1
7	Opava	22	10	12	1792	1851	−59	.455	Qualification to group A1
8	egoé Brno	22	8	14	1617	1744	−127	.364	Qualification to group A1
9	Geosan Kolín	22	7	15	1853	1974	−121	.318	Qualification to group A2
10	USK Praha	22	7	15	1637	1793	−156	.318	Qualification to group A2
11	NH Ostrava	22	6	16	1773	2067	−294	.273	Qualification to group A2
12	Kingspan Královští sokoli	22	3	19	1730	2016	−286	.136	Qualification to group A2

Source: NBL

=== Results ===
Home \ Away	DEC	CEZ	TUR	BRN	KOL	PAR	KRA	OST	OLO	OPA	SLU	USK
Armex Děčín	—	68–93	77–79	69–63	94–74	72–68	99–79	106–78	100–84	100–79	106–109	68–65
ČEZ Nymburk	106–88	—	85–77	98–63	107–79	118–68	100–71	100–59	96–76	108–78	92–81	101–56
Dekstone Tuři Svitavy	84–69	64–68	—	73–67	104–68	85–93	102–77	106–86	85–76	96–58	66–70	85–70
egoé Brno	77–68	70–91	73–83	—	66–87	70–87	89–77	77–68	71–88	67–59	71–80	87–69
Geosan Kolín	101–105	95–116	90–95	75–80	—	97–96	104–78	101–65	90–96	80–91	90–92	79–76
JIP Pardubice	67–76	70–90	93–85	85–69	78–84	—	114–93	128–71	82–70	100–55	82–67	63–68
Kingspan Královští sokoli	84–90	72–108	78–90	84–79	88–74	75–85	—	88–75	52–85	64–89	73–91	87–90
NH Ostrava	96–101	73–94	81–92	75–81	83–80	100–92	97–83	—	81–91	108–120	92–85	90–85
Olomoucko	88–67	77–89	65–81	86–90	111–82	99–76	88–82	95–70	—	91–90	101–79	79–77
Opava	61–77	79–81	88–73	79–53	80–71	82–89	102–91	95–79	102–92	—	94–79	63–74
Sluneta	76–66	80–92	56–103	86–78	86–87	79–96	77–67	97–66	89–88	93–68	—	82–69
USK Praha	69–89	59–97	80–82	77–76	87–65	64–73	88–87	70–80	89–99	85–80	70–81	—

Source: NBL
Legend: Blue = home team win; Red = away team win.

== Second stage ==
=== Group A1 ===
==== Standings ====
Pos	Team	Pld	W	L	PF	PA	PD	Pts	Qualification
1	ČEZ Nymburk	36	36	0	3472	2623	+849	72	Qualification to quarterfinals
2	Dekstone Tuři Svitavy	36	22	14	2989	2874	+115	58	Qualification to quarterfinals
3	Armex Děčín	36	20	16	2886	2915	−29	56	Qualification to quarterfinals
4	Olomoucko	36	20	16	3222	2983	+239	56	Qualification to quarterfinals
5	JIP Pardubice	36	20	16	3002	2875	+127	56	Qualification to quarterfinals
6	Opava	36	19	17	2961	2945	+16	55	Qualification to quarterfinals
7	Sluneta	36	17	19	2888	3005	−117	53	Qualification to round of 16
8	egoé Brno	36	11	25	2592	2935	−343	47	Qualification to round of 16

Source: NBL

==== Results ====
Home \ Away	DEC	CEZ	TUR	BRN	PAR	OLO	OPA	SLU
Armex Děčín	—	74–94	73–82	62–60	80–69	79–76	78–70	75–76
ČEZ Nymburk	97–53	—	93–79	95–57	83–77	105–83	112–82	101–79
Dekstone Tuři Svitavy	85–88	69–87	—	78–66	71–63	96–93	73–97	81–77
egoé Brno	89–70	60–111	77–74	—	81–80	73–103	80–91	72–81
JIP Pardubice	92–80	64–80	97–77	73–58	—	91–98	80–74	79–75
Olomoucko	90–71	94–98	106–81	96–66	93–98	—	113–64	94–74
Opava	70–58	89–90	110–68	91–63	87–77	72–64	—	87–60
Sluneta	85–90	60–96	78–85	86–73	69–77	95–94	78–84	—

Source: NBL
Legend: Blue = home team win; Yellow = draw; Red = away team win.

=== Group A2 ===
==== Standings ====
Pos	Team	Pld	W	L	PF	PA	PD	Pts	Qualification
1	USK Praha	34	15	19	2693	2733	−40	49	Qualification to round of 16
2	Geosan Kolín	34	14	20	2914	3072	−158	48	Qualification to round of 16
3	NH Ostrava	34	10	24	2778	3125	−347	44	
4	Kingspan Královští sokoli	34	8	26	2748	3060	−312	42	Qualification to relegation group

Source: NBL

==== Results ====
Home \ Away	KOL	KRA	OST	USK	KOL	KRA	OST	USK
Geosan Kolín	—	85–76	87–82	82–103	—	108–104	89–77	83–92
Kingspan Královští sokoli	124–71	—	93–82	77–67	82–81	—	97–102	86–94
NH Ostrava	86–106	110–65	—	78–70	83–88	90–76	—	72–96
USK Praha	110–99	78–58	95–65	—	79–82	76–80	96–78	—

Source: NBL
Legend: Blue = home team win; Red = away team win.

== Playoffs ==
Seeded teams played at home games 1, 2, 5 and 7, while the third place game where played with a best-of-three format, playing the seeded team the matches 1 and 3 at home, and the finals in a double-legged one.

=== Bracket ===
Round of 16
egoé Brno	0
USK Praha	2
Sluneta	2
Geosan Kolín	1

Quarter-finals
ČEZ Nymburk	4
USK Praha	0
Olomoucko	4
JIP Pardubice	0
Dekstone Tuři Svitavy	4
Sluneta	1
Armex Děčín	4
Opava	3

Semi-finals
ČEZ Nymburk	4
Olomoucko	0
Dekstone Tuři Svitavy	2
Armex Děčín	4

Final
ČEZ Nymburk	3
Armex Děčín	0
Third place
Dekstone Tuři Svitavy	0
Olomoucko	2

=== Round of 16 ===
Team 1	Series	Team 2	Game 1	Game 2	Game 3
Sluneta	2–1	Geosan Kolín	70–80	83–72	
egoé Brno	0–2	USK Praha	61–78	69–77	

=== Quarter-finals ===
Team 1	Series	Team 2	Game 1	Game 2	Game 3	Game 4	Game 5	Game 6	Game 7
ČEZ Nymburk	4–0	USK Praha	100–78	95–58	88–50	77–92			
Dekstone Tuři Svitavy	4–1	Sluneta	95–83	87–76	81–71	91–94	109–71		
Armex Děčín	4–3	Opava	84–79	90–82	68–89	64–73	93–87	74–84	79–62
Olomoucko	4–0	JIP Pardubice	86–81	102–91	93–87	100–91			

=== Semi-finals ===
Team 1	Series	Team 2	Game 1	Game 2	Game 3	Game 4	Game 5	Game 6	Game 7
ČEZ Nymburk	4–0	Olomoucko	103–80	88–78	85–76	102–67			
Dekstone Tuři Svitavy	2–4	Armex Děčín	86–81	84–95	78–59	93–80	73–79	85–88	

=== Third place ===
Team 1	Series	Team 2	Game 1	Game 2	Game 3
Dekstone Tuři Svitavy	0–2	Olomoucko	84–91	88–100	

=== Finals ===
Team 1	Series	Team 2	Game 1	Game 2	Game 3	Game 4	Game 5
ČEZ Nymburk	3–0	Armex Děčín	105–65	76–65	89–60		

== Relegation group ==
=== Standings ===
Pos	Team	Pld	W	L	PF	PA	PD	Pts	Relegation	KRA	GBA	HRA
1	Kingspan Královští sokoli	2	1	1	184	175	+9	3		—	94–82	—
2	GBA EU	2	1	1	188	192	−4	3	Relegated	—	—	106–98
3	Fiobanka Jindřichův Hradec	2	1	1	191	196	−5	3	Relegated	93–90	—	—

Source: NBL

== Czech clubs in European competitions ==
Team	Competition	Progress
ČEZ Nymburk	Champions League	Regular season
Opava	Champions League	Regular season
JIP Pardubice	Champions League	Third qualifying round
JIP Pardubice	FIBA Europe Cup	Regular season
Dekstone Tuři Svitavy	FIBA Europe Cup	First qualifying round

== Czech clubs in international competitions ==
Team	Competition	Progress
Sluneta Ústí nad Labem	Alpe Adria Cup	Quarterfinals
USK Praha	Alpe Adria Cup	Quarterfinals
Armex Děčín	Alpe Adria Cup	Regular season
Egoe Brno	Alpe Adria Cup	Regular season
