= BK Olomoucko =

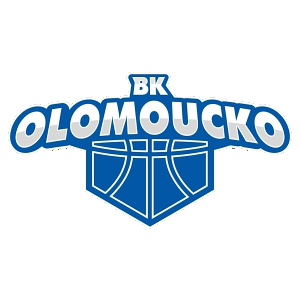
- Leagues: NBL
- Founded: 2017; 8 years ago
- History: BK Olomoucko (2017–present)
- Arena: Čajkaréna
- Capacity: 276
- Location: Olomouc, Czech Republic
- Team colors: Blue, White
- President: Libor Špunda
- Team manager: Pavel Tuček
- Head coach: Andy Hipsher
- Website: https://www.bkredstone.cz

BK Olomoucko is a Czech professional basketball club based in Olomouc. Founded in 2017, the team currently plays in the NBL, the highest tier of Czech basketball. The team entered the NBL in 2017–18, when it replaced Orli Prostějov, which was dissolved that summer. The team was relocated in may 2021 from Prostějov to Olomouc.

== Season by season ==
Season	League	Finish	Wins	Losses	Win%	Playoffs	Czech Cup
Olomoucko
2017–18	NBL	6th	13	19	.406	Lost quarter-finals (Opava), 0–4	–
2018–19	NBL	4th	20	16	.556	Won quarter-finals (Pardubice), 4–0; Lost semi-finals (Nymburk), 0–4	Third place
2019–20	NBL	6th	12	10	.545	DNQ	
2020–21	NBL	11th	9	23	.281	DNQ	
2021–22	NBL	11th	9	25	.265	DNQ	
2022–23	NBL	11th	8	26	.235	DNQ	
2023–24	NBL	10th	14	20	.412	DNQ	
2024–25	NBL	3rd	17	19	.472	Won 1/8 Finals (Pardubice), 2–1; Won quarter-finals (Opava), 4–2; Lost semi-finals (Nymburk), 1–4; Won Third place (Děčín), 2–0	
