= 2016–17 National Basketball League (Czech Republic) season =

Kooperativa NBL^{1}
- Season: 2016–17
- Teams: 12

Finals
- Champions: ČEZ Nymburk (14th title)
- Runners-up: Armex Děčín
- ^{1} Sponsored league name.

The 2016–17 National Basketball League (Czech Republic) season was the 24th season of the Czech NBL.

== Format ==
Teams in regular season play home and away against every other team in a round-robin tournament, before being split into two groups of six teams for playing again home and away against the teams from the same group.

After the end of the stage after the first split, the six teams from to top group and the two first qualified teams from the bottom group joined the play-offs.

The other four teams would play again home and away against themselves for avoiding the relegation.

== Regular season ==
Pos	Team	Pld	W	L	PF	PA	PD	Pts	Qualification
1	ČEZ Nymburk	32	31	1	3003	2229	+774	63	Qualification to play-offs
2	JIP Pardubice	32	24	8	2719	2432	+287	56	Qualification to play-offs
3	Armex Děčín	32	18	14	2453	2510	−57	50	Qualification to play-offs
4	USK Praha	32	16	16	2251	2298	−47	48	Qualification to play-offs
5	Opava	32	16	16	2601	2523	+78	48	Qualification to play-offs
6	Geosan Kolín	32	14	18	2554	2695	−141	46	Qualification to play-offs
7	Dekstone Tuři Svitavy	32	16	16	2440	2399	+41	48	Qualification to play-offs
8	Sluneta	32	14	18	2473	2581	−108	46	Qualification to play-offs
9	NH Ostrava	32	13	19	2447	2555	−108	45	
10	Lions Jindřichův Hradec	32	11	21	2533	2784	−251	43	
11	mmcité Brno	32	10	22	2432	2695	−263	42	
12	Ariete Prostějov	32	9	23	2500	2705	−205	41	Relegation play-offs

Source: NBL

== Playoffs ==
Seeded teams played at home games 1, 2, 5 and 7, while the finals and the third place game where played with a double-legged series, playing the seeded team the second match at home.

Quarter-finals
ČEZ Nymburk	114	86	114	97
Sluneta Ústí nad Labem	78	59	67	90
USK Praha	53	74	57	56	70	68
Opava	82	49	72	67	56	73
JIP Pardubice	92	82	67	70	90
Dekstone Tuři Svitavy	74	68	74	62	62
Armex Děčín	74	80	72	73	82
Geosan Kolín	60	71	54	79	48

Semi-finals
ČEZ Nymburk	100	117	76	79	90
Opava	64	51	80	66	54
JIP Pardubice	67	72	54	65	61
Armex Děčín	69	63	74	66	69

Final
ČEZ Nymburk	82	70	152
Armex Děčín	71	56	137

Third place
Opava	67	82	149
JIP Pardubice	88	82	170

== Clubs in European competitions ==
Team	Competition	Progress
ČEZ Nymburk	Champions League	Playoff round
JIP Pardubice	FIBA Europe Cup	Second round

== Clubs in international competitions ==
Team	Competition	Progress
Armex Děčín	Alpe Adria Cup	Regular season
