= 2017–18 NBL (Czech Republic) season =

Kooperativa NBL^{1}
- Season: 2017–18
- Teams: 12

Regular season
- Relegated: Fiobanka Jindřichův Hradec

Finals
- Champions: ČEZ Nymburk (15th title)
- Runners-up: Opava
- Third place: Pardubice
- Fourth place: Dekstone Tuři Svitavy
- ^{1} Sponsored league name.

The 2017–18 National Basketball League (Czech Republic) season is the 25th season of the Czech NBL.

== Format ==
Teams in regular season play home and away against every other team in a round-robin tournament, before being split into two groups of six teams for playing again home and away against the teams from the same group.

After the end of the stage after the first split, the six teams from to top group and the two first qualified teams from the bottom group joined the play-offs.

The other four teams would play again home and away against themselves for avoiding the relegation.

== Teams ==
Location of teams in the 2017–18 NBL

Olomoucko replaced Ariete Prostějov, which was relegated from the previous season and was dissolved.

Team	City	Venue
Armex Děčín	Děčín	ARMEX Sportcentrum
ČEZ Nymburk	Nymburk	Sportovní Centrum
Dekstone Tuři Svitavy	Svitavy	Na Střelnici
Fiobanka Jindřichův Hradec	Jindřichův Hradec	Městská Sportovní Hala
Geosan Kolín	Kolín	Hala SOU Spojů
JIP Pardubice	Pardubice	Sportovní hala Dašická
mmcité+ Brno	Brno	Hala Míč
NH Ostrava	Ostrava	Bonver Aréna
Opava	Opava	Hala Opava
Olomoucko	Prostějov	Sportcentrum - DDM
Sluneta	Ústí nad Labem	Sportovni Hala Klise
USK Praha	Prague	Hala Folimanka

== Regular season ==
=== Standings ===
Pos	Team	Pld	W	L	PF	PA	PD	Pts	Qualification
1	ČEZ Nymburk	22	22	0	2293	1582	+711	44	Qualification to group A1
2	JIP Pardubice	22	16	6	1932	1678	+254	38	Qualification to group A1
3	Opava	22	15	7	1883	1711	+172	37	Qualification to group A1
4	Armex Děčín	22	13	9	1784	1786	−2	35	Qualification to group A1
5	Dekstone Tuři Svitavy	22	12	10	1807	1749	+58	34	Qualification to group A1
6	Olomoucko	22	11	11	1904	1989	−85	33	Qualification to group A1
7	Sluneta	22	11	11	1735	1752	−17	33	Qualification to group A2
8	Geosan Kolín	22	10	12	1780	1851	−71	32	Qualification to group A2
9	USK Praha	22	9	13	1620	1740	−120	31	Qualification to group A2
10	mmcité+ Brno	22	6	16	1573	1816	−243	28	Qualification to group A2
11	NH Ostrava	22	6	16	1757	2025	−268	28	Qualification to group A2
12	Fiobanka Jindřichův Hradec	22	1	21	1746	2135	−389	23	Qualification to group A2

Source: NBL

== Second stage ==
=== Group A1 ===
Pos	Team	Pld	W	L	PF	PA	PD	Pts	Qualification
1	ČEZ Nymburk	32	31	1	3241	2348	+893	63	Qualification to playoffs
2	JIP Pardubice	32	23	9	2719	2454	+265	55	Qualification to playoffs
3	Opava	32	20	12	2702	2546	+156	52	Qualification to playoffs
4	Armex Děčín	32	17	15	2493	2569	−76	49	Qualification to playoffs
5	Dekstone Tuři Svitavy	32	15	17	2570	2565	+5	47	Qualification to playoffs
6	Olomoucko	32	13	19	2780	2915	−135	45	Qualification to playoffs

Source: NBL

=== Group A2 ===
Pos	Team	Pld	W	L	PF	PA	PD	Pts	Qualification
1	Sluneta	32	18	14	2580	2528	+52	50	Qualification to playoffs
2	Geosan Kolín	32	16	16	2629	2642	−13	48	Qualification to playoffs
3	USK Praha	32	16	16	2403	2464	−61	48	Qualification to relegation group
4	NH Ostrava	32	12	20	2576	2843	−267	44	Qualification to relegation group
5	mmcité+ Brno	32	9	23	2311	2607	−296	41	Qualification to relegation group
6	Fiobanka Jindřichův Hradec	32	2	30	2511	3034	−523	34	Qualification to relegation group

Source: NBL

== Playoffs ==
Seeded teams played at home games 1, 2, 5 and 7, while the third place game where played with a best-of-three format, playing the seeded team the matches 1 and 3 at home, and the finals in a double-legged one.

Quarter-finals
ČEZ Nymburk	122	94	106	99
Geosan Kolín	68	65	61	71
Armex Děčín	80	61	69	78	84	69
Dekstone Tuři Svitavy	92	64	82	77	61	84
JIP Pardubice	76	76	58	91	99	87	70
Sluneta	80	75	70	89	82	88	60
Opava	94	93	89	96
Olomoucko	88	63	71	73

Semi-finals
ČEZ Nymburk	79	89	94	97
Dekstone Tuři Svitavy	70	67	68	65
JIP Pardubice	69	60	104	65	89
Opava	79	74	90	83	90

Final
ČEZ Nymburk	114	114
Opava	90	73

Third place
JIP Pardubice	71	75	84
Dekstone Tuři Svitavy	65	83	59

== Relegation group ==
Pos	Team	Pld	W	L	PF	PA	PD	Pts	Qualification
1	USK Praha	38	19	19	2892	2919	−27	57	
2	mmcité+ Brno	38	14	24	2857	3079	−222	52	
3	NH Ostrava	38	14	24	3046	3403	−357	52	
4	Fiobanka Jindřichův Hradec	38	4	34	3003	3544	−541	42	Qualification to relegation playoffs

Source: NBL

== Relegation playoffs ==
Team 1	Agg.	Team 2	1st leg	2nd leg
Fiobanka Jindřichův Hradec	187–195	Královští sokoli	96–93	91–102

== Clubs in European competitions ==
Team	Competition	Progress	Ref
ČEZ Nymburk	Champions League	Round of 16	
JIP Pardubice	FIBA Europe Cup	Second qualifying round	

== Clubs in international competitions ==
Team	Competition	Progress
USK Praha	Alpe Adria Cup	Semifinals
mmcite+ Brno	Alpe Adria Cup	Semifinals
Armex Děčín	Alpe Adria Cup	Quarterfinals
Sluneta Ústí nad Labem	Alpe Adria Cup	Regular season
