= Darius Washington Jr. =

American-Northern Macedonian basketball player (born 1985)

Personal information
- Born: December 6, 1985 (age 40) Winter Park, Florida, U.S.
- Listed height: 6 ft 2 in (1.88 m)
- Listed weight: 200 lb (91 kg)

Career information
- High school: Edgewater (Orlando, Florida)
- College: Memphis (2004–2006)
- NBA draft: 2006: undrafted
- Playing career: 2006–2022
- Position: Point guard / shooting guard
- Number: 35

Career history
- 2006: PAOK Thessaloníki
- 2006–2007: ČEZ Nymburk
- 2007: Austin Toros
- 2007: San Antonio Spurs
- 2007–2008: Aris Thessaloniki
- 2008–2009: Ural Great Perm
- 2009–2010: Galatasaray
- 2010–2011: Lottomatica Roma
- 2011: Piratas de Quebradillas
- 2011–2012: Türk Telekom
- 2012: Piratas de Quebradillas
- 2012–2013: Hapoel Eilat
- 2013: Le Mans Sarthe
- 2013–2014: Olin Edirne
- 2014–2015: ČEZ Nymburk
- 2016: Sakarya Isik Koleji
- 2016: Henan Roaring Elephants
- 2018: Iraklis Thessaloniki
- 2019: Rabotnički
- 2020: Ostioneros de Guaymas
- 2020–2021: Phoenix Brussels
- 2022: Peja

Career highlights
- Liga Unike champion (2022); Turkish League Top Scorer (2014); EuroCup Top Scorer (2010); 2x Czech League champion (2007, 2015); Czech League Finals MVP (2015); Czech Cup winner (2007); Chinese NBL All-First Team (2016); McDonald's All-American (2004); First-team Parade All-American (2004); Fourth-team Parade All-American (2003); Florida Mr. Basketball (2004)
- Stats at NBA.com
- Stats at Basketball Reference

Darius Myron Washington Jr. (born December 6, 1985) is an American-Macedonian former professional basketball player who last played for Peja of the Kosovo Superleague.

He is a combo guard and played college basketball with the University of Memphis. He has also played with the NBA's San Antonio Spurs and the NBA D-League's Austin Toros in 2007. He also is the subject of a Phish song called The Line.

== Amateur career ==
An AAU national champion at age 10, Washington attended Edgewater High School in Orlando, Florida. In his senior year, he played in an ESPN High School Showcase game against future NBA player Sebastian Telfair.

He went to University of Memphis, where he earned Conference USA Rookie of the Year and freshman All-American honors on averages of 15.4 points per game and a team-best 3.8 assists. With no time remaining in the championship game of the 2005 Conference-USA tournament, Washington was given three free throws to overcome a 75–73 lead by the sixth-ranked Louisville Cardinals. Although Washington was a 72-percent shooter, he missed two of the three foul shots, giving Louisville the win and an appearance in the NCAA tournament while Washington and the Tigers' season would continue in the NIT, where they would reach the semifinal round.

In his sophomore season at Memphis, Washington helped lead the #1-seeded Tigers to an Elite Eight appearance in the 2006 NCAA tournament, losing to eventual runner-up UCLA. He was named to the All-Conference USA first team and earned an honorable mention as an All-American by the Associated Press.

== Professional career ==
On April 25, 2006, Washington declared himself as an early entry candidate for the 2006 NBA draft. Confident he would be drafted, he signed with a sports agent on June 26, two days before the draft, losing his eligibility to play in college. With analysts being skeptical on his reliability to play point guard, he was not drafted. Although analyst Dick Vitale and others believed Washington had a shot to make an NBA roster as a free agent, he failed to do so after trying out with several teams during training camp.

=== Europe ===
He was later drafted by the Austin Toros of the D-League, but he instead chose to sign with PAOK Thessaloniki of the Greek League. In 2007, he led the ČEZ Nymburk team to the Czech Republic League title after leaving PAOK. He played in the ULEB Cup competition during the year with both clubs.

In January 2008, Washington signed a 2-year contract with the Euroleague club Aris Thessaloniki, a team that competes in the Greek League. He was released by Aris after one season. At the end of October 2008, he signed a contract with the Russian Super League club Ural Great Perm.

In July 2009, he signed a contract with Galatasaray Cafe Crown.

In April 2010, he signed with Lottomatica Roma until the end of the season.

In 2011, he joined the Piratas de Quebradillas.

In the summer of 2011, he signed a contract with Türk Telekom.

In January 2013, he joined Israeli side Hapoel Eilat, but only played 6 games with the team, averaging 11ppg and 1.3apg. Though highly praised in Eilat, his contract was bought out and in February, he moved to French side Le Mans. In July 2013, he joined Olin Edirne Basket in Turkey.

On June 23, 2014, he signed with his former team ČEZ Nymburk for the 2014–15 season.

On January 16, 2018, he returned to Greece and joined Iraklis Thessaloniki of the Greek A2 Basket League.

On April 5, 2019, he signed with Macedonian basketball club Rabotnički.

On May 4, 2020, he signed with Phoenix Brussels.

=== The Basketball Tournament (TBT) ===
In the summer of 2018, Washington competed in The Basketball Tournament on ESPN for Team DRC. In three games, he averaged 15.0 points, 4.0 rebounds, 2.0 assists and 2.0 steals per game. His team was eliminated in Super 16 Round by Ram Nation.

In the summer of 2019, he also competed in The Basketball Tournament on ESPN. In two games for Bluff City, he averages 12.5 points, 3.5 rebounds, 1.0 assists and 1 steals per game. His team was eliminated in Round 2 of Memphis Regional Tournament by Louisiana United.

== Career statistics ==
Legend
GP	Games played	GS	Games started	MPG	Minutes per game
FG%	Field-goal percentage	3P%	3-point field-goal percentage	FT%	Free-throw percentage
RPG	Rebounds per game	APG	Assists per game	SPG	Steals per game
BPG	Blocks per game	PPG	Points per game	PIR	Performance index rating
**Bold**	Career high

=== NBA ===
==== Regular season ====
Year	Team	GP	GS	MPG	FG%	3P%	FT%	RPG	APG	SPG	BPG	PPG
2007–08	San Antonio	18	0	8.1	.438	.333	.538	1.1	.8	.3	.0	2.9
Career		18	0	8.1	.438	.333	.538	1.1	.8	.3	.0	2.9

=== EuroLeague ===
Year	Team	GP	GS	MPG	FG%	3P%	FT%	RPG	APG	SPG	BPG	PPG	PIR
2007–08	Aris	9	2	22.6	.412	**.400**	.789	2.8	**3.1**	**1.3**	**.3**	10.2	11.8
2010–11	Roma	**16**	**13**	**26.5**	**.507**	.300	**.849**	**3.0**	1.9	1.1	.0	**13.0**	**12.3**
Career		25	15	25.1	.477	.333	.824	2.9	2.4	1.2	.1	12.0	12.0

=== NBA ===
Washington signed with the San Antonio Spurs on October 1, 2007, and was assigned to the Austin Toros of the NBA D-League in late November. He was called up in early December to take Tony Parker's spot on the roster while he healed from an injury; however, Washington was waived by the Spurs on December 28. He appeared in 18 games for the Spurs where he averaged 2.9 points and 1.1 rebounds in 8.1 minutes.

He played with the Chicago Bulls during the 2008–09 NBA pre-season, but was waived by the team before the start of the regular season.

== Macedonian national team ==
Washington was granted Macedonian citizenship, and he joined the Macedonian national basketball team.

== In popular culture ==
The song "The Line" by Phish was written about the missed free throws at the conclusion of the 2005 C-USA Championship game. The song premiered in Atlantic City, New Jersey on October 31, 2013. However, during the performance, Phish guitarist Trey Anastasio mistakenly referred to Washington as having played for Michigan State, and the missed free throws as having taken place during the Final Four.
