= Oren Amiel =

Israeli basketball player and coach

Oren Amiel אורן עמיאל
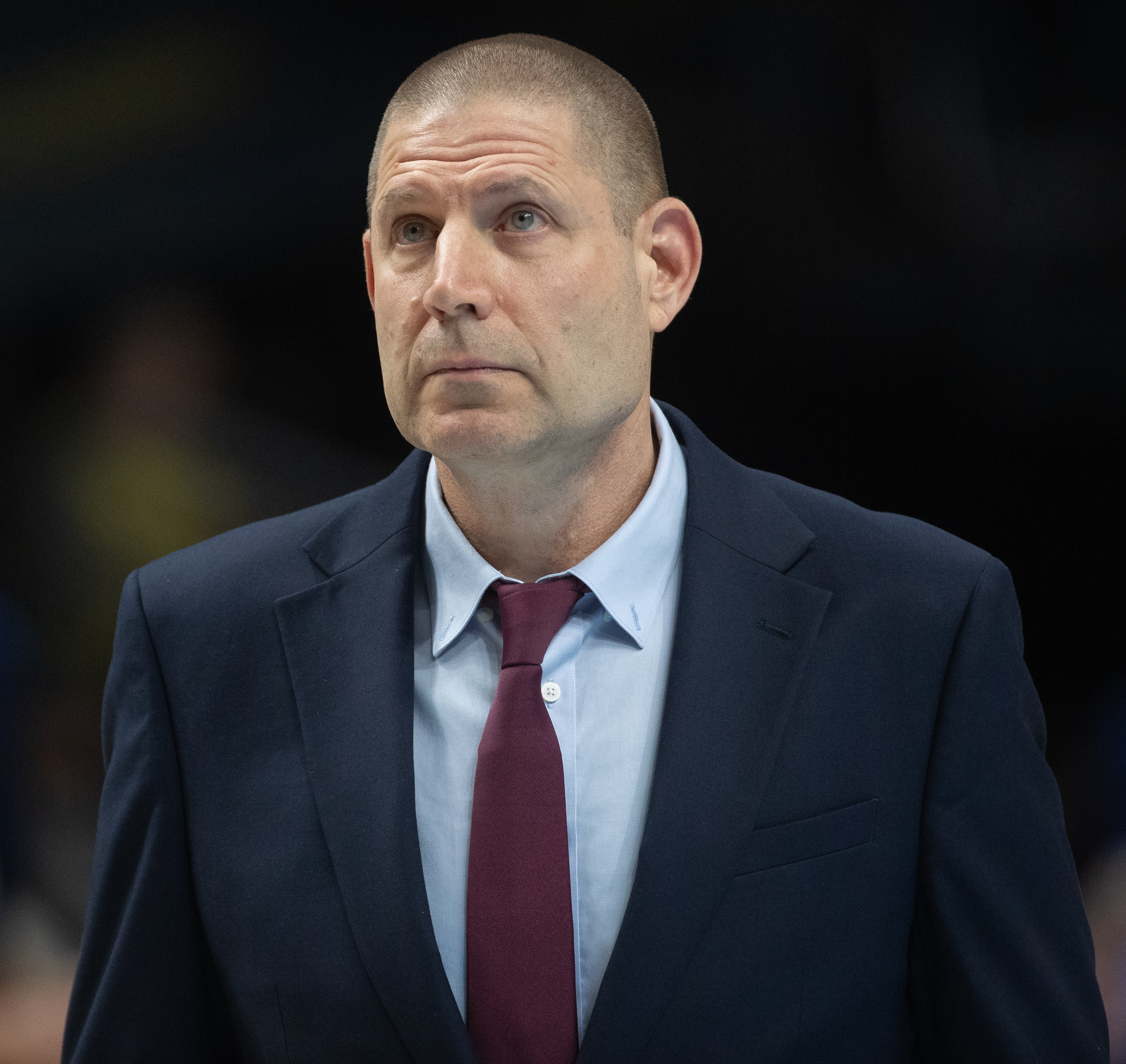
- Amiel as the head coach of Nymburk in 2025

ERA Nymburk
- Title: Head coach
- League: NBL

Personal information
- Born: December 19, 1971 (age 54)
- Listed height: 6 ft 0 in (1.83 m)

Career information
- Playing career: 1994–1999
- Position: Point guard
- Coaching career: 2004–present

Career history

Playing
- 1994–1999: Hapoel Galil Elyon

Coaching
- 2004–2006: Hapoel Galil Elyon (assistant)
- 2006: Hapoel Galil Elyon
- 2006–2007: Hapoel Galil Elyon (assistant)
- 2007–2008: Maccabi Tel Aviv (assistant)
- 2008–2009: Hapoel Yokneam/Megido
- 2009–2011: Hapoel Nazareth Elite
- 2011–2014: Nymburk (assistant)
- 2014–2015: Hapoel Jerusalem (assistant)
- 2015–2017: Nymburk (assistant)
- 2017–2021: Nymburk
- 2021: Hapoel Jerusalem
- 2021–2024: Brose Bamberg
- 2025–present: Nymburk

Career highlights
- As head coach: Basketball Champions League Coach of the Year (2019–2020); 4× Czech League champion (2018–2021); 3× Czech Cup winner

Oren Amiel (Hebrew: אורן עמיאל; born December 19, 1971), is an Israeli professional basketball coach for ERA Nymburk of the National Basketball League and former player.

== Professional career ==
=== Hapoel Galil Elyon (1994–1999) ===
Amiel played point guard for Hapoel Galil Elyon from 1994 to 1999.

== Coaching career ==
=== Early positions (2004–2017) ===
Amiel began his coaching career in 2004 as an assistant coach for Oded Kattash at Hapoel Galil Elyon. He held subsequent assistant positions at Maccabi Tel Aviv and Nymburk as well as head coaching positions in the lower Leumit League between 2007 and 2017.

=== Nymburk (2017–2021) ===
In 2017, Amiel was named head coach at Nymburk when Ronen Ginzburg resigned to take over the Czech national team full time.

In his 4 seasons at Nymburk, Amiel's teams won the Czech League championship each year in addition to winning 3 Czech Cups, and he was named the Basketball Champions League Coach of the Year after the 2019–2020 season.

=== Hapoel Jerusalem (2021) ===
On June 24, 2021, Hapoel Jerusalem announced that Amiel had signed a two-year contract to become their new head coach.

On October 28, 2021, Jerusalem fired Amiel in the wake of the team's 0–3 start in the Champions League and named Yotam Halperin as their new interim head coach.

=== Brose Bamberg (2021–2024) ===
On November 29, 2021, he has signed with Brose Bamberg of the German Basketball Bundesliga.

=== Back to Nymburk (2025–present) ===
On June 3, 2025, he signed with ERA Nymburk of the National Basketball League.

== See also ==
- Sports in Israel
