= Jan Stehlík =

Jan Stehlík may refer to:

- Jan Stehlík (basketball) (born 1986), Czech basketball player
- Jan Stehlík (handballer) (born 1985), Czech handball player
- Jan Stehlík (wrestler), Czech Olympic wrestler
