= Eurocup 2014–15 Regular Season Group G =

Standings and Results for Group G of the Last 32 phase of the 2014–15 Eurocup basketball tournament.

== Standings ==
Pos	Team	Pld	W	L	PF	PA	PD	UNK	ZEN	SIG	NYM
1	(Russia) UNICS	6	4	2	460	432	+28		103–67	60–82	75–67
2	(Russia) Zenit	6	3	3	439	479	−40	65–77		87–82	63–84
3	(France) Strasbourg	6	3	3	450	433	+17	72–61	61–73		87–80
4	(Czech Republic) ČEZ Nymburk	6	2	4	454	459	−5	79–84	72–84	72–66	

Source: Euroleague Basketball;
