= Jan Stehlík (basketball) =

Czech basketball player

Personal information
- Born: 10 June 1986 (age 40)
- Listed height: 184 cm (6 ft 0 in)
- Listed weight: 90 kg (198 lb)

Career information
- High school: Bílovec, Czechoslovakia (now Czech Republic)
- Playing career: 1997–present
- Position: Point guard
- Number: 4, 22

Career history
- 1997–2005: TJ Gymnázium Hladnov
- 2002–2003: NH Ostrava
- 2003–2004: VŠB TU Ostrava
- 2005–2010: BK NH Ostrava
- 2005–2010: SKB Valašské Meziříčí
- 2017: Nový Jičín
- 2019: BK Snakes Ostrava

Jan Stehlík (born 10 July 1986) is a Czech former basketball player. Standing at 184 cm (6 ft 1/2 in), he mainly played as point guard. In his career, Stehlík played for several clubs in the Czech Republic.
