= SK Slavia Prague ERA NBK =

- League: NBL; Champions League
- Founded: 1943; 83 years ago
- Location: Prague, Czech Republic
- Team colors: Red and White
- Website: slavia.basketball/

SK Slavia Prague ERA NBK, commonly known as Sportovní klub Slavia Praha or Slavia Prague, are a Czech professional basketball club based in Prague. They are playing in the National Basketball League (NBL), after being promoted from the 1. Ligy in 2021–22.

SK Slavia Prague merged with Basketball Nymburk before the 2026–2027 season, becoming known as SK Slavia Prague ERA NBK.

== Honours ==
1. liga

- Champions (1): 2021–22
