= BK Pardubice =

BK KVIS Pardubice
- League: NBL; Champions League
- Founded: 1956; 70 years ago
- Arena: Sportovní hala Dašická (occasional games at Hala Dukla)
- Capacity: 1,400
- Location: Pardubice, Czech Republic
- Team colors: Red and White
- Championships: 2 Czech Republic Cups
- Website: bkpardubice.cz
Home	Away

Basketbalový klub Pardubice, mostly known for sponsorship reasons as KVIS Pardubice is a Czech professional basketball club based in the city of Pardubice. They play in the Czech National Basketball League (NBL), the highest competition in the Czech Republic.

== Name through history ==
- 1956–1990 Rudá hvězda Pardubice
- 1990–1993 SKP Pardubice (Sportovní klub policie Pardubice)
- 1993–1997 BHC SKP Pardubice
- 1997–1998 BK Pardubice
- 1998–2003 Ostacolor BK Pardubice
- 2003–2010 BK Synthesia Pardubice
- 2010–2022 BK JIP Pardubice
- 2022–present BK KVIS Pardubice

== Honours ==
Czech League

- Runners-up (1): 2025–26
- Third place (2): 2015–16, 2016–17

Czech Cup

- Champions (2): 1993–94, 2015–16

Alpe Adria Cup

- Champions (1): 2019–20
- Runners-up (1): 2021–22

== Roster ==
Note: Flags indicate national team eligibility at FIBA-sanctioned events. Players may hold other non-FIBA nationalities not displayed.

BK KVIS Pardubice roster
Players
Coaches

Pos.	No.	Nat.	Name	Ht.	Age
PG	3	(United States)	Bonham, Trey	1.83 m (6 ft 0 in)	24 – 14 April 2002
G	4	(United States)	Bryant Jr., Joe	1.85 m (6 ft 1 in)	26 – 5 March 2000
G	7	(Czech Republic)	Lukeš, Adam	1.90 m (6 ft 3 in)	22 – 1 March 2004
C	9	(Czech Republic)	Švrdlík, Kamil	2.05 m (6 ft 9 in)	39 – 25 November 1986
G/F	13	(United States)	Moffatt, Ryan	1.97 m (6 ft 6 in)	26 – 26 May 2000
PF	17	(Czech Republic)	Štovíček, Petr	2.01 m (6 ft 7 in)	22 – 24 July 2004
PF	21	(Czech Republic)	Kovář, Luboš	2.04 m (6 ft 8 in)	25 – 10 November 2000
C	23	(United States)	Key, Zed	2.03 m (6 ft 8 in)	24 – 4 April 2002
SF	24	(Czech Republic)	Stampley, Nick	1.97 m (6 ft 6 in)	27 – 5 May 1999
F	33	(Czech Republic)	Vlk, Dalibor	2.02 m (6 ft 8 in)	24 – 26 May 2002
PG	98	(Czech Republic)	Tůma, Jakub	1.93 m (6 ft 4 in)	28 – 9 September 1998
G/F	–	(New Zealand)	Davidson, Isaac	2.02 m (6 ft 8 in)	29 – 22 June 1997

Head coach

- (Czech Republic) Jan Šotnar

Assistant coach(es)

- (Czech Republic) Jan Dvořáček
- (Czech Republic) Jan Moucha

Team manager

- (Czech Republic) Radek Nečas

Legend

- (C) Team captain
- Injured

- Roster
Updated: October 25, 2026

== Season by season ==
Season	Tier	League	Pos.	Czech Cup	European competitions		
2008–09	1	NBL	9th				
2009–10	1	NBL	4th				
2010–11	1	NBL	3rd	Quarterfinalist			
2011–12	1	NBL	4th	Quarterfinalist	3 EuroChallenge	T16	5–7
2012–13	1	NBL	5th	Runner-up			
2013–14	1	NBL	3rd	Third place			
2014–15	1	NBL	5th	Fourth place			
2015–16	1	NBL	3rd	Champion			
2016–17	1	NBL	3rd	Third place	4 FIBA Europe Cup	R2	6–6
2017–18	1	NBL	3rd	Runner-up	4 FIBA Europe Cup	QR2	2–2
2018–19	1	NBL	5th	Quarterfinalist	3 Champions League	QR3	0–2
2018–19	1	NBL	5th	Quarterfinalist	4 FIBA Europe Cup	RS	0–6
2019–20	1	NBL	6th (Note: The season ended prematurely on 18 March 2020 due to the COVID-19 pandemic.)	Quarterfinalist			
2020–21	1	NBL	6th	Fourth place			
2021–22	1	NBL	6th	Third place			
2022–23	1	NBL	4th	Quarterfinalist			
2023–24	1	NBL	6th	Quarterfinalist	4 FIBA Europe Cup	QR	0–2
2024–25	1	NBL	9th				
2025–26	1	NBL	2nd	Runner-up			
