= BC Nový Jičín =

- Leagues: NBL
- Founded: 1990; 35 years ago
- Arena: Bazén Nový Jičín
- Capacity: 1,100
- Location: Nový Jičín, Czech Republic
- Championships: 1 Czech Championship; 5 Czech Cups; 1 Central European Basketball League
- Website: basketnj.cz
Home

BC Nový Jičín is a basketball team based in Nový Jičín that plays in the top professional Czech basketball league, the NBL. The team also used to go by the name Mlékárna Kunín, winning the National Basketball League under that name in 1998–99.

In the 2009–10 season, the club won the Central European Basketball League (CEBL).

== Name through history ==
Naming

- BC Nový Jičín (1990–1997)
- BC Mlékárna Kunín (1997–2007)
- BC Nový Jičín (2007–present)

In some cases the names of the club have included the names of the club's main sponsors.

- Tabák (1992)
- Tonak (1993–1996)
- ICEC (1996–1997)
- Geofin (2007–2009)
- Mlékárna Miltra (2009)
- Unibon (2010)

== Notable players ==
Note: Flags indicate national team eligibility at FIBA-sanctioned events. Players may hold other non-FIBA nationalities not displayed.

Criteria

To appear in this section a player must have either:

- Set a club record or won an individual award while at the club
- Played at least one official international match for their national team at any time
- Played at least one official NBA match at any time.

- (Puerto Rico) Emmanuel Ubilla 1 season: 2008–09
