= BK Opava =

- Leagues: NBL; Europe Cup
- Founded: 1945
- Arena: Hala Opava
- Capacity: 3,006
- Location: Opava, Czech Republic
- President: Viktor Cvek
- Team manager: Radim Vysocký
- Head coach: David Zach
- Team captain: Jakub Šiřina
- Ownership: City of Opava
- 2026 position: NBL, 2nd of 12
- Championships: 5 Czech Championships; 6 Czech Cups
- Website: www.bkopava.cz
Home	Away

BK Opava is a Czech professional basketball club based in the historical city of Opava. The club was founded in 1945 and currently plays in the NBL.

The club has won the Czech National Basketball League four times – most recently in the 2002–03 season. It also has won six Czech Cup titles, the most recent one being in 2022.

The club plays its home games at the Hala Opava, which has a capacity of 3,006 people.

== History ==
Opava had its glory years in the 00s, as the team won the Czech championship in 1997, 1998, 2002 and 2003. The team also won five Czech Cup titles, including three straight from 1997 until 1999. In the 2017–18 season, Opava reached the finals of the NBL season. By achieving this, the club qualified for the regular season of the 2018–19 Basketball Champions League season. After 20 years of waiting, club won Czech league again in 2023, which again allowed Opava to compete in Basketball Champions League.

== Name through history ==
- 1945–1995 BC Opava
- 1995–1996 ICEC Opava Basketbal
- 1996–1997 ICEC Opava
- 1997–2000 BC Slovnaft Opava
- 2000–2008 BC Opava
- 2008–2012 BC Breda & Weinstein Opava
- 2012–present BK Opava

== Honours ==
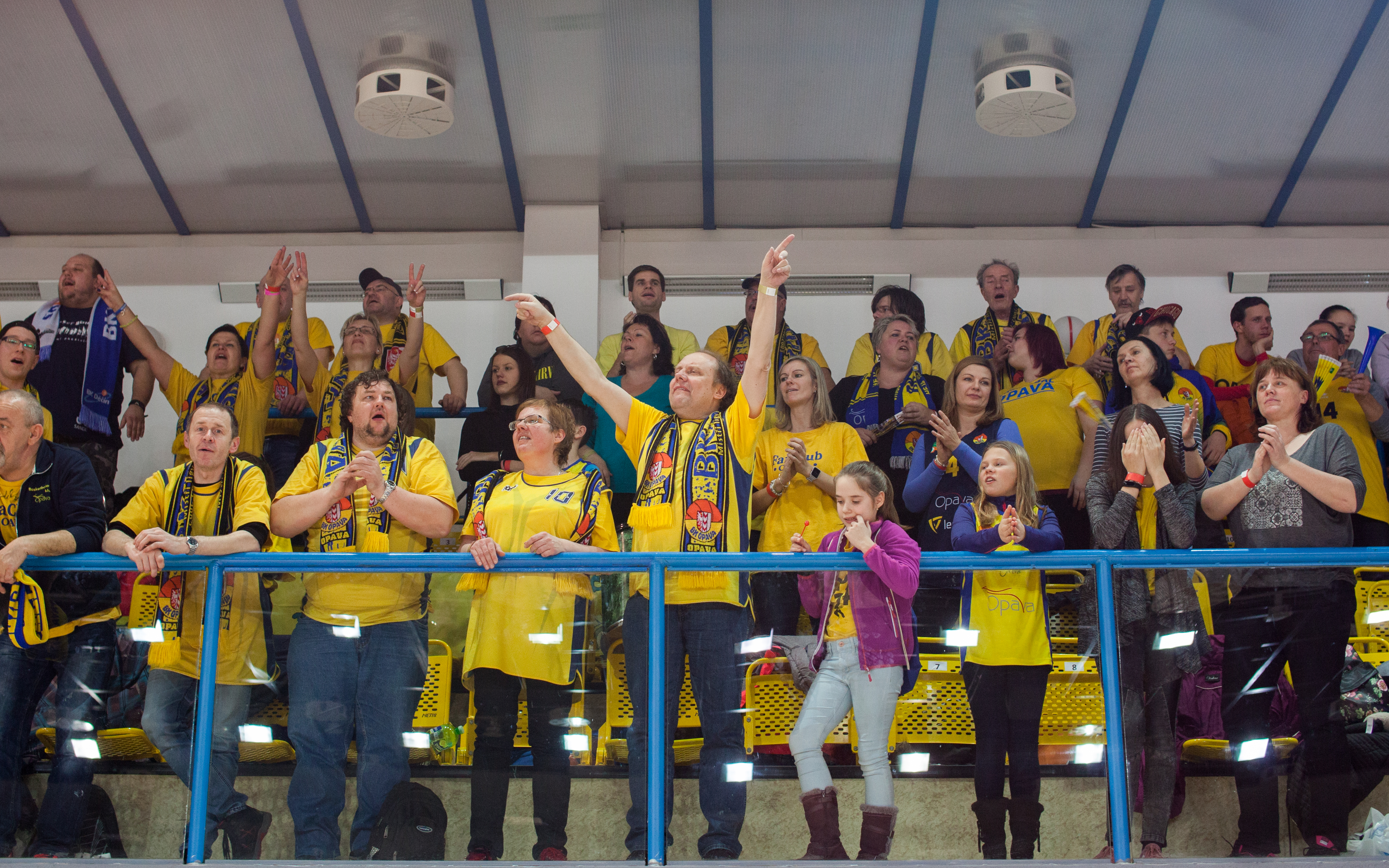
BK Opava fans in February 2019

=== Domestic competitions ===
- Czech Republic Championship:
  - Winners (5): 1996–97, 1997–98, 2001–02, 2002–03, 2022–23
    - Runners-up (1): 2017–18, 2019-20, 2020-21, 2021-22
- Czech Republic Cup:
  - Winners (6): 1996–97, 1997–98, 1998–99, 2000–01, 2002–03, 2021–22

== Players ==
=== Current roster ===
Note: Flags indicate national team eligibility at FIBA-sanctioned events. Players may hold other non-FIBA nationalities not displayed.

BK Opava roster
Players
Coaches

Pos.	No.	Nat.	Name	Ht.	Age
F	0	(United States)	Montgomery, Jalen	1.96 m (6 ft 5 in)	25 – 27 April 2001
C	5	(United States)	Chargois, Ethan	2.06 m (6 ft 9 in)	27 – 19 January 1999
F	8	(Czech Republic)	Švandrlík, Jan	2.01 m (6 ft 7 in)	32 – 28 January 1994
F	9	(Czech Republic)	Zbránek, Filip	1.96 m (6 ft 5 in)	35 – 15 November 1990
F	10	(Czech Republic)	Svoboda, Matěj	2.00 m (6 ft 7 in)	30 – 22 September 1996
G	11	(Czech Republic)	Kavan, Kryštof	1.98 m (6 ft 6 in)	24 – 4 March 2002
SF	12	(Czech Republic)	Gronsky, Vojtech	1.92 m (6 ft 4 in)	17 – 4 July 2009
C	20	(Czech Republic)	Puršl, Šimon	2.06 m (6 ft 9 in)	29 – 29 January 1997
PG	21	(Czech Republic)	Kouřil, Radovan	1.85 m (6 ft 1 in)	31 – 8 April 1995
PG	24	(Czech Republic)	Šiřina, Jakub	1.86 m (6 ft 1 in)	38 – 21 November 1987
G/F	25	(Czech Republic)	Vyroubal, Marek	1.96 m (6 ft 5 in)	25 – 2 April 2001
SF	33	(Czech Republic)	Slavík, Jakub	2.00 m (6 ft 7 in)	27 – 29 April 1999
C	77	(United States)	Tucker, Eliah	2.05 m (6 ft 9 in)	23 – 14 March 2003

Head coach

- (Czech Republic) David Zach

Assistant coach(es)

- (Czech Republic) Kryštof Vlček
- (Czech Republic) Luděk Jurečka

Team manager

- (Czech Republic) Martin Gniadek

Legend

- (C) Team captain
- Injured

- Roster
Updated: September 17, 2026

== Season by season ==
Season	Tier	League	Pos.	Czech Cup	European competitions		
2007–08	2	1. Liga	1st				
2008–09	1	NBL	7th				
2009–10	1	NBL	7th				
2010–11	1	NBL	7th	Quarterfinalist			
2011–12	1	NBL	14th				
2012–13	1	NBL	9th				
2013–14	1	NBL	4th	Fourth place			
2014–15	1	NBL	5th	Quarterfinalist			
2015–16	1	NBL	4th	Third place			
2016–17	1	NBL	5th	Runner-up			
2017–18	1	NBL	2nd	Quarterfinalist			
2018–19	1	NBL	7th		2 Champions League	RS	2–12
2019–20	1	NBL	2nd				
2020–21	1	NBL	2nd				
2021–22	1	NBL	2nd	Champions	3 FIBA Europe Cup	RS	1–5
2022–23	1	NBL	Champions	Quarterfinalist	3 FIBA Europe Cup	RS	3–3
2023–24	1	NBL	5th	Quarterfinalist	2 Champions League	RS	0–6
2024–25	1	NBL	5th		R European North Basketball League	RS	5–3
2025–26	1	NBL	3rd	Third place	R European North Basketball League	R16	5–4
