= Czech Republic Basketball Cup =

Basketball competition

Czech Basketball Cup
- Sport: Basketball
- Founded: 1994
- First season: 1993–94
- Country: Czech Republic
- Continent: FIBA Europe
- Most recent champions: Basketball Nymburk (2025–26; 18th title)
- Most titles: Basketball Nymburk (18 titles)
- Related competitions: National Basketball League

The Czech Basketball Cup is the annual top-tier level national basketball cup competition that is held in the Czech Republic, for professional teams. It is organized by the Czech Basketball Federation (Česká Basketbalová Federace), the governing body of basketball in the Czech Republic. The first edition of the competition was played in 1994. ČEZ Nymburk is the all-time record holder, with 15 titles. The competition concludes with a Final Four each season, including a third-place game.

== Title holders ==
- 1993–94 JIP Pardubice
- 1994–95 Tonak Nový Jičín
- 1995–96 Tonak Nový Jičín
- 1996–97 Opava
- 1997–98 Opava
- 1998–99 Opava
- 1999–00 Mlékárna Kunín
- 2000–01 Opava
- 2001–02 Mlékárna Kunín
- 2002–03 Opava
- 2003–04 ČEZ Nymburk
- 2004–05 ČEZ Nymburk
- 2005–06 Mlékárna Kunín
- 2006–07 ČEZ Nymburk
- 2007–08 ČEZ Nymburk
- 2008–09 ČEZ Nymburk
- 2009–10 ČEZ Nymburk
- 2010–11 ČEZ Nymburk
- 2011–12 ČEZ Nymburk
- 2012–13 ČEZ Nymburk
- 2013–14 ČEZ Nymburk
- 2014–15 Prostějov
- 2015–16 JIP Pardubice
- 2016–17 ČEZ Nymburk
- 2017–18 ČEZ Nymburk
- 2018–19 ČEZ Nymburk
- 2019–20 ČEZ Nymburk
- 2020–21 ČEZ Nymburk
- 2021–22 Opava
- 2022–23 Děčín
- 2023–24 ČEZ Nymburk
- 2024–25 ČEZ Nymburk
- 2025–26 ČEZ Nymburk

== Performance by club ==
Club	Winners	Winning years
ČEZ Nymburk	18	2003–04, 2004–05, 2006–07, 2007–08, 2008–09, 2009–10, 2010–11, 2011–12, 2012–13, 2013–14, 2016–17, 2017–18, 2018–19, 2019–20, 2020–21, 2023–24, 2024–25, 2025–26
Opava	6	1996–97, 1997–98, 1998–99, 2000–01, 2002–03, 2021–22
Nový Jičín	5	1994–95, 1995–96, 1999–00, 2001–02, 2005–06
Pardubice	2	1993–94, 2015–16
Prostějov	1	2014–15
Děčín	1	2022–23

== Final Fours ==
Season	Host city	Champions	Finals score	Runners-up	Third place	Score	Fourth place
1993–94	Žďár n.S.	Pardubice	77–74	Nový Jičín	Lokomotiva Ústí nad Labem; Sokol Vyšehrad		
1994–95	Trutnov	Mlékárna Kunín	76–70	Sparta Praha	Brno; USK Praha		
1995–96	Litoměřice	Mlékárna Kunín	78–75	USK Praha	Sparta Praha; Pardubice		
1996–97	Kroměříž	Opava		Brno			
1997–98	Strakonice	Opava	97–66	Mlékárna Kunín	Děčín; Sluneta Ústí nad Labem		
1998–99	Sokolov	Opava	84–80	NH Ostrava	Děčín; Pardubice		
1999–00	Č.Budějovice	Mlékárna Kunín	69–63	Opava	Sluneta Ústí nad Labem		
2000–01	Ml. Boleslav	Opava	84–60	USK Praha	Brno	94–83	Mlékárna Kunín
2001–02	Zlín	Mlékárna Kunín	85–83	Opava	Sparta Praha	101–80	Děčín
2002–03	Svitavy	Opava	79–72	Brno	Nymburk	102–94	Sparta Praha
2003–04	Prostějov	Nymburk	95–87	Opava	NH Ostrava	93–84	Děčín
2004–05	Olomouc	Nymburk	117–87	Prostějov	Mlékárna Kunín	115–94	Sparta Praha
2005–06	Ústi n.L.	Mlékárna Kunín	73–63	Prostějov	Nymburk	90–69	Děčín
2006–07	Olomouc	Nymburk	81–63	NH Ostrava	Prostějov	73–59	Kondoři Liberec
2007–08	Ml. Boleslav	Nymburk	80–68	Prostějov	Pardubice	78–69	NH Ostrava
2008–09	Brno	Nymburk	86–61	Prostějov	Pardubice	76–74	Nový Jičín
2009–10	Klatovy	Nymburk	66–48	Nový Jičín	Prostějov	83–77	Pardubice
2010–11	Opava	Nymburk	86–85	Nový Jičín	Děčín	82–69	Prostějov
2011–12	Děčín	Nymburk	76–69	Děčín	USK Praha	83–74	Prostějov
2012–13	Liberec	Nymburk	87–83	Pardubice	NH Ostrava	93–82	Prostějov
2013–14	Jindř. Hradec	Nymburk	91–67	Prostějov	Pardubice	92–77	Opava
2014–15	Brno	Prostějov	84–51	Děčín	Brno	90–79	Pardubice
2015–16	Pardubice	Pardubice	87–67	Děčín	Opava	91–75	Kolín
2016–17	Prostějov	Nymburk	72–52	Opava	Pardubice	90–51	Prostějov
2017–18	Svitavy	Nymburk	86–65	Pardubice	Tuři Svitavy	81–65	Děčín
2018–19	Nový Jičín	Nymburk	102–68	Opava	Olomoucko	86–78	Děčín
2019–20	Plzeň	Nymburk	100–94	USK Praha	Tuři Svitavy	97–77	Opava
2020–21	Nymburk	Nymburk	96–71	Kolín	Královští Sokoli	92–90	Pardubice
2021–22	Louny	Opava	97–93	Nymburk	Pardubice	79–74	Brno
2022–23	Prague	Děčín	87–74	Brno	Kolín	92–89	Sluneta Ústí nad Labem

== See also ==
- Czech National Basketball League
