= Tuři Svitavy =

- Leagues: NBL
- Founded: 2001
- History: Basketbal Svitavy (2001–2011); Tuři Svitavy (2011–Present)
- Arena: Na Střelnici
- Capacity: 820
- Location: Svitavy, Czech Republic
- Team colors: White, Red, Black
- Head coach: Martin Šorf
- Championships: 1. Liga
- Website: basketbalsvitavy.cz
Home	Away

Tuři Svitavy is a professional basketball team that plays in the second Czech basketball league, the 1. Liga. The team is based in the town of Svitavy.

== History ==
The first basketball team in Svitavy was established in 1951, under the name TJ Svitavy. A professional team was established in 2001 under the name Basketball Svitavy. From the 2010–2011 to 2020–2021 season, Tuři Svitavy have competed in the Czech top-level National Basketball League.

== European record ==
Season	Competition	Round	Club	Home	Away	Agg
2018–19	FIBA Europe Cup	QR1	(Turkey) Istanbul BB	74–99	98–78	152–197

Notes

1. Tuři Svitavy points are listed first.

== Players ==
=== Current roster ===
Note: Flags indicate national team eligibility at FIBA-sanctioned events. Players may hold other non-FIBA nationalities not displayed.

Tuři Svitavy roster
Players
Coaches

Pos.	No.	Nat.	Name	Ht.
PF	1	(United States)	Aiken, C.J.	2.06 m (6 ft 9 in)
PG	4	(Czech Republic)	Welsch, Marek	1.80 m (5 ft 11 in)
PF	6	(Czech Republic)	Novák, Martin	1.99 m (6 ft 6 in)
PG	8	(Slovakia)	Marko, Roman	1.92 m (6 ft 4 in)
PG	10	(Czech Republic)	Kotásek, Eduard	1.89 m (6 ft 2 in)
SF	11	(Czech Republic)	Svoboda, Matěj	2.00 m (6 ft 7 in)
SF	12	(Czech Republic)	Teplý, Tomáš	1.93 m (6 ft 4 in)
C	20	(Czech Republic)	Puršl, Šimon	2.03 m (6 ft 8 in)
C	21	(Czech Republic)	Kovář, Luboš	2.04 m (6 ft 8 in)
PF	22	(Czech Republic)	Jelínek, Jiří	2.03 m (6 ft 8 in)
SG	25	(Czech Republic)	Slezák, Pavel	1.87 m (6 ft 2 in)
SF	33	(United States)	O'Brien, Sean	2.01 m (6 ft 7 in)

Head coach

- (Czech Republic) Lubomír Růžička

Legend

- (C) Team captain
- Injured

- Roster
Updated: January 17, 2018

=== Notable players ===
- Geno Crandall
