= BC Kolín =

Geosan Kolín
- League: NBL
- Founded: 1940
- History: BC Kolín; 1940–present
- Arena: Hala SOU Spojů
- Capacity: 610
- Location: Kolín, Czech Republic
- Team colors: Cyan and Dark Blue

BC Kolín, for sponsorship reasons known as BK Geosan Kolín, is a Czech professional basketball club based in the town of Kolín. They played in the Czech National Basketball League (NBL), the highest competition in the Czech Republic. Kolín played its home games in the Hala SOU Spojů.

== Honours ==
Czech Republic Basketball Cup

- Runners-up (1): 2020–21

== Players ==
=== Current roster ===
Note: Flags indicate national team eligibility at FIBA-sanctioned events. Players may hold other non-FIBA nationalities not displayed.

BC Unikol Kolín roster
Players
Coaches

Pos.	No.	Nat.	Name	Ht.
SF	10	(Czech Republic)	Němeček, Jakub	1.95 m (6 ft 5 in)
C	11	(Czech Republic)	Machač, David	2.05 m (6 ft 9 in)
PF	12	(Czech Republic)	Adamec, Filip	2.03 m (6 ft 8 in)
PG	15	(Puerto Rico)	Ubilla, Manny	1.89 m (6 ft 2 in)
SG	25	(Czech Republic)	Matějka, Robin	1.90 m (6 ft 3 in)
C	33	(Slovenia)	Benáček, Uroš	2.06 m (6 ft 9 in)
SG	44	(Czech Republic)	Vyoral, Tomáš	1.90 m (6 ft 3 in)
PF	54	(Czech Republic)	Kříž, Martin	2.01 m (6 ft 7 in)
PG		(Serbia)	Igrutinović, Luka	1.93 m (6 ft 4 in)

Head coach

- (Slovenia) Predrag Benáček

Legend

- (C) Team captain
- Injured

- Roster

=== Notable players ===
Note: Flags indicate national team eligibility at FIBA-sanctioned events. Players may hold other non-FIBA nationalities not displayed.

Criteria

To appear in this section a player must have either:

- Set a club record or won an individual award while at the club
- Played at least one official international match for their national team at any time
- Played at least one official NBA match at any time.

- (Czech Republic) Stanislav Zuzák
- (Puerto Rico) Manny Ubilla
- (Serbia) Dejan Radulović
- (United States) Demarius Bolds
