= BK NH Ostrava =

- League: NBL
- Founded: 1953; 72 years ago
- Arena: Bonver Aréna
- Capacity: 1,700
- Location: Ostrava, Czech Republic
- President: Ladislav Kudela
- Head coach: Dušan Medvecký
- Website: www.bknhostrava.cz

BK Nová Huť Ostrava, commonly known as BK NH Ostrava, is a Czech professional basketball club based in the city of Ostrava. They play in the Czech National Basketball League – the highest competition in the Czech Republic.

Logo of the Flames NH Ostrava

== Honours ==
Czech Republic Basketball Cup

- Runners-up (1): 1998–99

== Youth department ==
The youth players of the club are included in its division Flames NH Ostrava.

== Players ==
=== Current roster ===
Note: Flags indicate national team eligibility at FIBA-sanctioned events. Players may hold other non-FIBA nationalities not displayed.

BK NH Ostrava roster
Players
Coaches

Pos.	No.	Nat.	Name	Ht.
PG	5	(United States)	Ames, Rahsaan Edward	1.83 m (6 ft 0 in)
PF	6	(Czech Republic)	Urbánek, Adam	1.95 m (6 ft 5 in)
SF	7	(Czech Republic)	Dedek, Jiří	1.90 m (6 ft 3 in)
PG	8	(Czech Republic)	Lyčka, Jan	1.85 m (6 ft 1 in)
SF	9	(Czech Republic)	Zbránek, Filip	1.95 m (6 ft 5 in)
PG	10	(Czech Republic)	Habily, Yannick	1.80 m (5 ft 11 in)
PG	11	(Czech Republic)	Číž, Adam	1.89 m (6 ft 2 in)
PF	13	(Czech Republic)	Medvecký, Michael	2.00 m (6 ft 7 in)
PF	14	(Czech Republic)	Gniadek, Martin	2.01 m (6 ft 7 in)
C	15	(Czech Republic)	Pelikán, Rostislav	2.09 m (6 ft 10 in)
PF	21	(United States)	Wilson, Jeremiah	2.03 m (6 ft 8 in)
SG	22	(Czech Republic)	Stehlík, Jan	1.84 m (6 ft 0 in)
SF	23	(Czech Republic)	Jurečka, Luděk	1.99 m (6 ft 6 in)
SG	25	(United States)	Barnes, Chadwick Farrell	1.91 m (6 ft 3 in)
F	33	(United States)	Kerr, Garret	1.94 m (6 ft 4 in)

Head coach

- (Czech Republic) Dušan Medvecký

Assistant coach(es)

- (Czech Republic) Marek Stuchlý
- (Czech Republic) Zdeněk Hummel

Legend

- (C) Team captain
- Injured

- Roster

== Notable players ==
- (Israel) Anton Shoutvin
