= Basketball Nymburk =

ERA Nymburk
- Leagues: NBL
- Founded: 1930; 96 years ago
- Dissolved: 2026; 0 years ago
- History: SK Železničáři; 1939–1945; Sokol; 1945–1950; Lokomotiva; 1950–1998; BK GA Nymburk; 1998–2002; BK ECM Nymburk; 2002–2004; ČEZ Nymburk; 2004–2019; ERA Nymburk; 2019–2026
- Arena: Sportovní centrum Nymburk (international games at Královka Arena)
- Capacity: 1,000 (Nymburk); 2,500 (Prague)
- Location: Nymburk, Czech Republic
- Team colors: Black, Orange, White
- President: Miroslav Jansta
- Head coach: Oren Amiel
- Championships: 21 Czech Championships; 18 Czech Cups
- Website: nymburk.basketball
| Home | Away |

Basketball Nymburk, also known as ERA Nymburk due to sponsorship reasons, was a professional basketball team that was based in the town of Nymburk in the Czech Republic. The club played in the top-tier level professional Czech National League (NBL). Nymburk regularly played in European competitions, as it last participated in the Basketball Champions League.

Basketball Nymburk was by far the most successful team in the national league, as it had won 19 titles since the 2003–04 season. The next closest team had just 5. It played its domestic competitions in Sportovní centrum Nymburk and international matches in Královka Arena in Prague.

Basketball Nymburk merged with SK Slavia Prague before the 2026–27 season, becoming known as SK Slavia Prague ERA NBK.

== History ==
Nymburk won the Czech National League championship every season from 2004 to 2022, also winning in 2023, 2024, and it has also played in several European-wide basketball competitions, including the European 2nd-tier level EuroCup. Some of the club's former players include Darius Washington, former NCAA champion and NBA player George Zidek, who was the team's press speaker, and naturalized Czech player Maurice Whitfield.

== Trophies ==
- Czech National League

Champions (21): 2004, 2005, 2006, 2007, 2008, 2009, 2010, 2011, 2012, 2013, 2014, 2015, 2016, 2017, 2018, 2019, 2021, 2022, 2024, 2025, 2026

- Czech Cup:

Winners (18): 2004, 2005, 2007, 2008, 2009, 2010, 2011, 2012, 2013, 2014, 2017, 2018, 2019, 2020, 2021, 2024, 2025, 2026

== Current roster ==
Note: Flags indicate national team eligibility at FIBA-sanctioned events. Players may hold other non-FIBA nationalities not displayed.

ČEZ Nymburk roster
Players
Coaches

| Pos. | No. | Nat. | Name | Ht. | Age |
|---|---|---|---|---|---|
| C | 7 | (Cape Verde) | Santos-Silva, Marcus | 2.02 m (6 ft 8 in) | 29 – 7 June 1997 |
| SF | 8 | (Czech Republic) | Nejezchleb, David | 2.03 m (6 ft 8 in) | 20 – 29 May 2006 |
| SF | 11 | (Czech Republic) | Svoboda, Matěj | 2.00 m (6 ft 7 in) | 30 – 22 September 1996 |
| PG | 12 | (United States) | Perkins, Tony | 1.93 m (6 ft 4 in) | 24 – 4 December 2001 |
| PF | 13 | (Czech Republic) | Bohm, David | 2.06 m (6 ft 9 in) | 25 – 31 July 2001 |
| PF | 14 | (Slovakia) | Stanko, Thomas | 2.04 m (6 ft 8 in) | 18 – 28 November 2007 |
| SG | 17 | (Czech Republic) | Bohačík, Jaromír | 1.97 m (6 ft 6 in) | 34 – 26 May 1992 |
| PG | 27 | (Israel) | Amiel, Bar | 1.78 m (5 ft 10 in) | 18 – 28 October 2007 |
| F | 31 | (Czech Republic) | Kříž, Martin | 2.00 m (6 ft 7 in) | 33 – 17 June 1993 |
| PF | 32 | (United States) | Shumate, JT | 2.01 m (6 ft 7 in) | 27 – 28 June 1999 |
| SG | 73 | (Czech Republic) | Rylich, František | 1.93 m (6 ft 4 in) | 24 – 31 March 2002 |
| SF | 77 | (Czech Republic) | Hruban, Vojtěch | 2.00 m (6 ft 7 in) | 37 – 29 August 1989 |

Head coach

- (Israel) Oren Amiel

Assistant coach(es)

- (Austria) Stefan Grassegger
- (Czech Republic) Eduard Kotásek

Strength & conditioning coach(es)

- (Lithuania) Ričardas Reimaris

Legend

- (C) Team captain
- Injured

- Roster
Updated: April 1, 2026

== Season by season ==
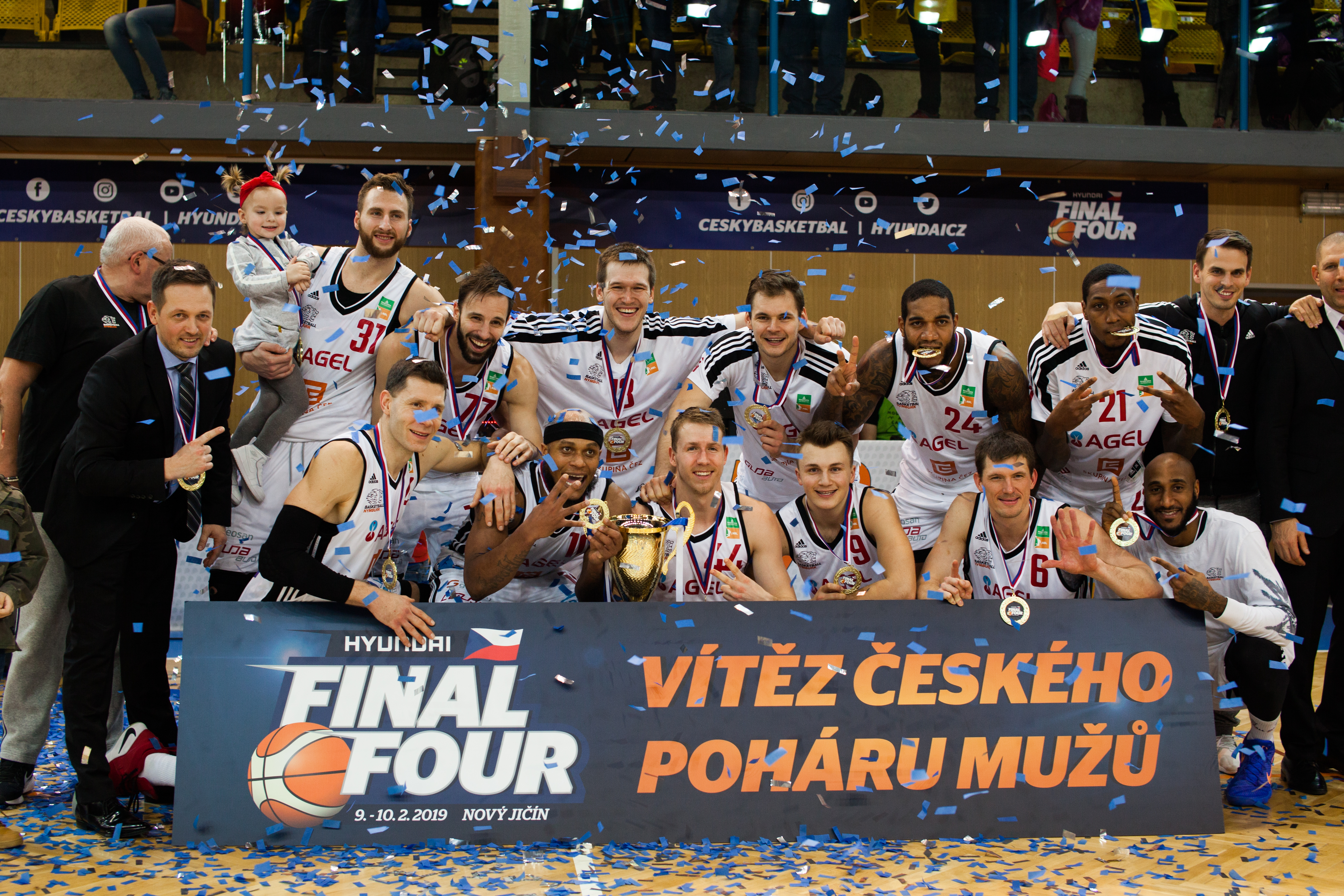
Nymburk celebrating its 13th Cup victory in 2019

| Season | Tier | League | Pos. | Czech Cup | European competitions | |
|---|---|---|---|---|---|---|
| 2002–03 | 1 | NBL | 2nd | Third | | |
| 2003–04 | 1 | NBL | 1st | Winner | 3 FIBA Europe League | RS |
| 2004–05 | 1 | NBL | 1st | Winner | 3 FIBA Europe League | T16 |
| 2005–06 | 1 | NBL | 1st | Third | 3 FIBA EuroCup | T16 |
| 2006–07 | 1 | NBL | 1st | Winner | 3 FIBA EuroCup | RS |
| 2007–08 | 1 | NBL | 1st | Winner | 2 ULEB Cup | RS |
| 2008–09 | 1 | NBL | 1st | Winner | 2 Eurocup | RS |
| 2009–10 | 1 | NBL | 1st | Winner | 2 Eurocup | QF |
| 2010–11 | 1 | NBL | 1st | Winner | 1 Euroleague | QR1 |
| 2010–11 | 1 | NBL | 1st | Winner | 2 Eurocup | T16 |
| 2011–12 | 1 | NBL | 1st | Winner | 1 Euroleague | QR3 |
| 2011–12 | 1 | NBL | 1st | Winner | 2 Eurocup | QF |
| 2012–13 | 1 | NBL | 1st | Winner | 1 Euroleague | QR2 |
| 2012–13 | 1 | NBL | 1st | Winner | 2 Eurocup | T16 |
| 2013–14 | 1 | NBL | 1st | Winner | 1 Euroleague | QR1 |
| 2013–14 | 1 | NBL | 1st | Winner | 2 Eurocup | EF |
| 2014–15 | 1 | NBL | 1st | | 1 Euroleague | QR1 |
| 2014–15 | 1 | NBL | 1st | | 2 Eurocup | R32 |
| 2015–16 | 1 | NBL | 1st | | 3 FIBA Europe Cup | R32 |
| 2016–17 | 1 | NBL | 1st | Winner | 3 Champions League | POQ |
| 2017–18 | 1 | NBL | 1st | Winner | 3 Champions League | R16 |
| 2018–19 | 1 | NBL | 1st | Winner | 3 Champions League | RS |
| 2019–20 | 1 | NBL | 1st (Note: The 2019–20 NBL season was ended prematurely on 13 March 2020 because of the COVID-19 pandemic. As such, Nymburk were named champions based on standings at that time.) | Winner | 3 Champions League | QF |
| 2020–21 | 1 | NBL | 1st | Winner | 3 Champions League | QF |
| 2021–22 | 1 | NBL | 1st | Runners-up | 3 Champions League | RS |
| 2022–23 | 1 | NBL | 3rd | QF | 3 Champions League | RS |
| 2023–24 | 1 | NBL | 1st | Winner | 4 FIBA Europe Cup | QF |
| 2024–25 | 1 | NBL | 1st | Winner | 3 Champions League | QF |
| 2025–26 | 1 | NBL | 1st | Winner | | |

== Notable players ==
Note: Flags indicate national team eligibility at FIBA-sanctioned events. Players may hold other non-FIBA nationalities not displayed.

Criteria

To appear in this section a player must have either:

- Set a club record or won an individual award while at the club
- Played at least one official international match for their national team at any time
- Played at least one official NBA match at any time.

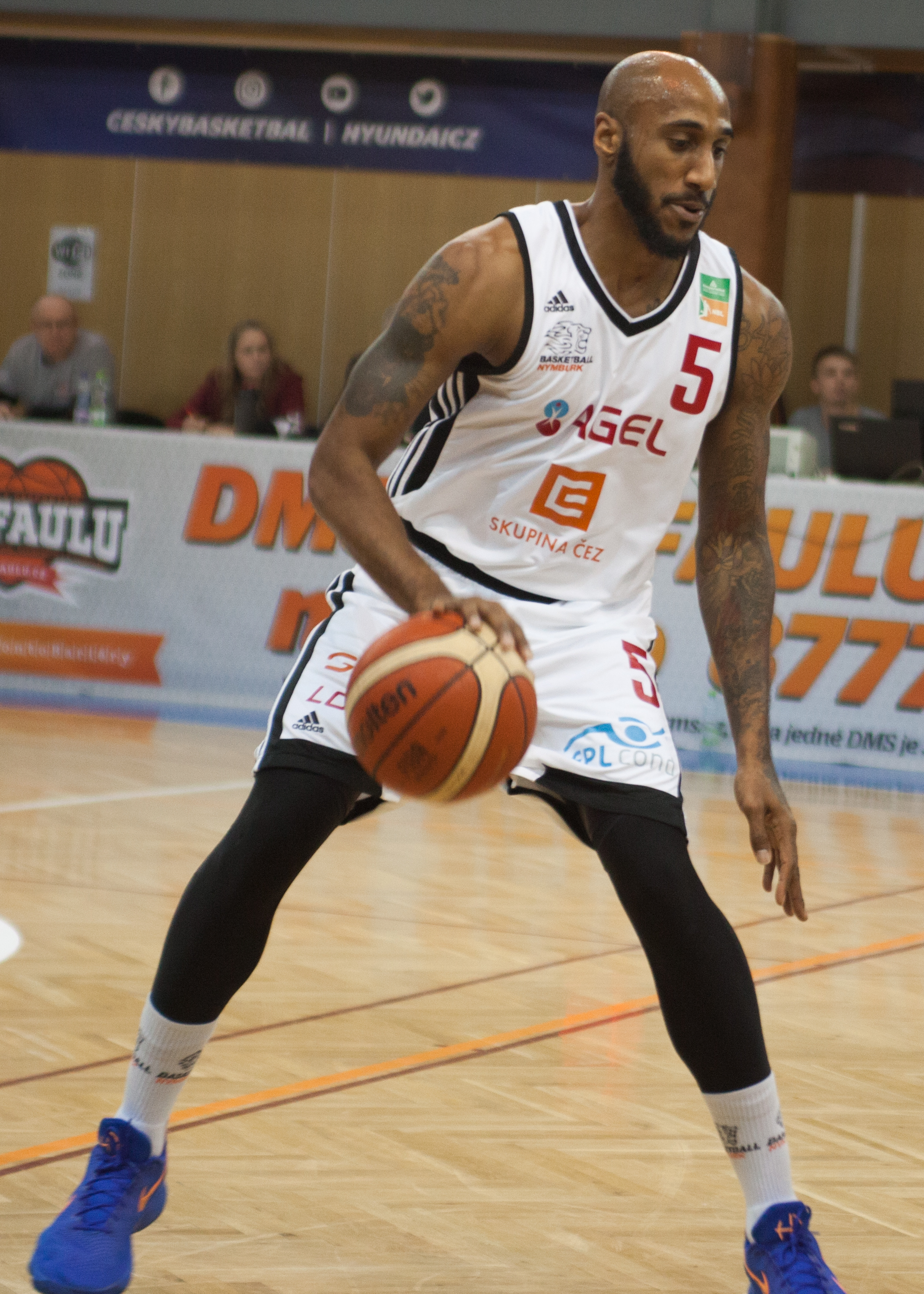
Bracey Wright

- (Czech Republic) Maurice Whitfield 4 seasons: '02–'06
- (Czech Republic) Jiří Zídek 2 seasons: '03–'05
- (Belgium) Maxime De Zeeuw 1 season: '15–'16
- (United Kingdom) Mike Lenzly 4 seasons: 2009–13
- (Germany) Michael Meeks 1 season: '06–'07
- (Kosovo) Dardan Berisha 1 season: '17–'18
- (Lithuania) Gintaras Einikis 1 season '05-'06
- (North Macedonia) Darius Washington 1 season: '06–'07
- (Puerto Rico) Guillermo Diaz 1 season: '06–'07
- (Slovenia) Goran Jagodnik 1 season: '08–'09
- (Israel) Afik Nissim
- (Sweden) Thomas Massamba 1 season: '13–'14
- (United States) Justin Gray 1 season: '08-'09
- (United States) Adam Koch 1 season: '10–'11
- (United States) Blake Schilb 2 seasons: '07–'09
- (Finland) Antti Nikkilä 1 season: '06–'07

== Head coaches ==
- (Israel) Muli Katzurin
- (Israel) Ronen Ginzburg
- (Lithuania) Kęstutis Kemzūra
- (Italy) Francesco Tabellini
- (Israel) Oren Amiel
