= Sluneta Ústí nad Labem =

- Leagues: NBL
- Founded: 1946; 80 years ago
- Arena: Sportovni Hala Klise
- Capacity: 1,500
- Location: Ústí nad Labem, Czech Republic
- Website: www.bkusti.cz
Home	Away

SLUNETA Ústí nad Labem is a professional basketball club based in Ústí nad Labem, Czech Republic. The club was founded in 1946 and currently plays in the top division NBL.
