= National Basketball League (Czech Republic) =

- Founded: 1993; 33 years ago
- First season: 1993
- Country: Czech Republic
- Confederation: FIBA Europe
- Number of teams: 12
- Level on pyramid: 1
- Relegation to: 1. Liga
- Domestic cup: Czech Basketball Cup
- International cup(s): Basketball Champions League; FIBA Europe Cup
- Current champions: Nymburk (21st title) (2025–26)
- Most championships: Nymburk (21 titles)
- Website: nbl.basketball
- 2025–26 National Basketball League

The Czech Republic National Basketball League (NBL) (Czech: Národní Basketbalová Liga) is the top-tier level professional basketball league in the Czech Republic. It is run by the Asociace Ligových Klubů. The league operates under a promotion and relegation system. The bottom two NBL teams from each season's standings are relegated to the 2nd-tier level 1. Liga, while the top two 1. Liga teams from each season's standings are promoted to the NBL.

ERA Nymburk has won the most titles with 21.

== 2024–25 teams ==
Location of teams in 2024–25 National Basketball League

== Logos ==
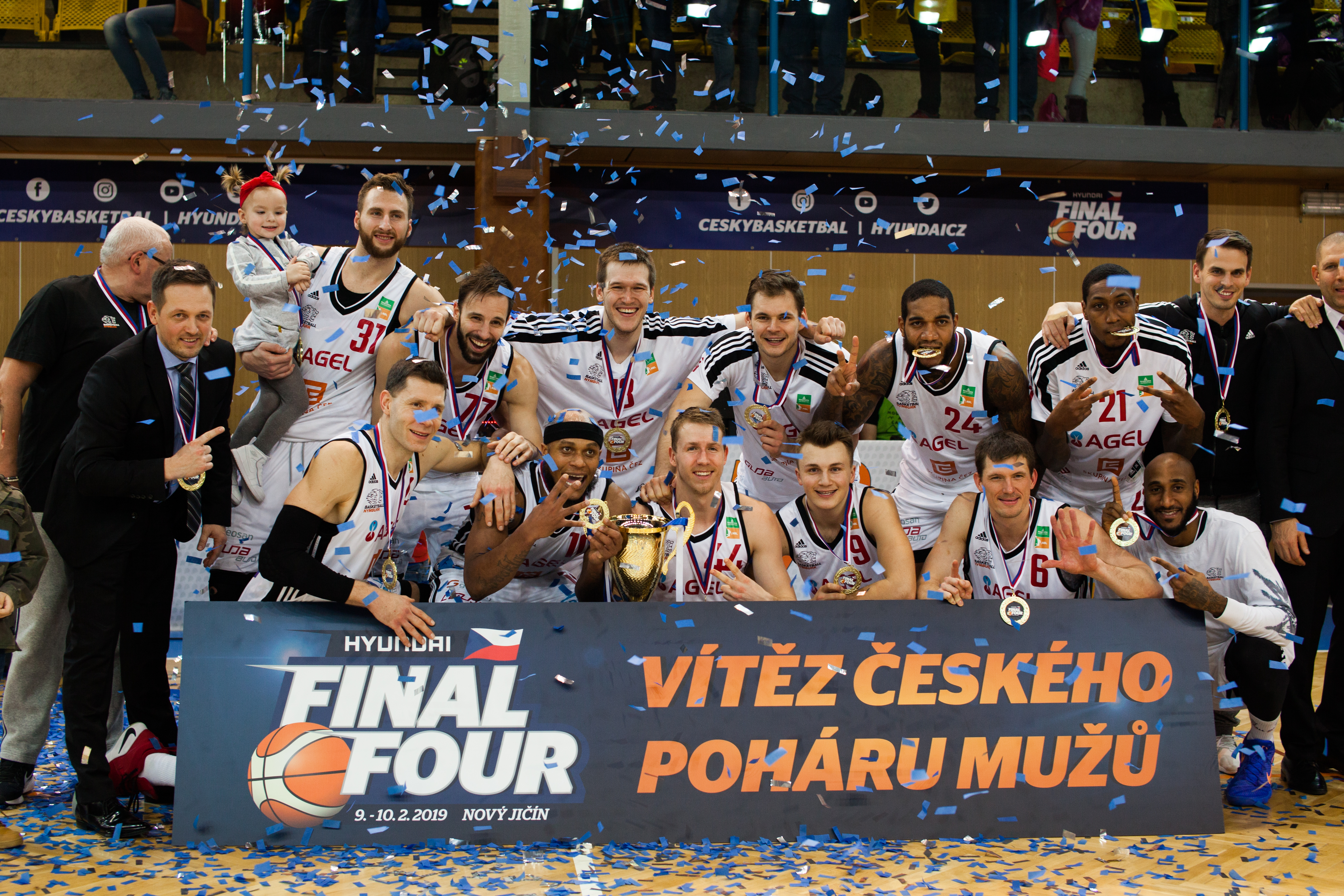
Nymburk celebrating its 13th Cup victory in 2019

(The former sponsorship logo of the league, when it was named the "Mattoni NBL" 1998–2014.)

(The former sponsorship logo of the league, when it was named the "Kooperativa NBL" 2014–2025.)

(The current sponsorship logo of the league, named "Maxa NBL" 2025–present.)

== Teams ==
The following are the teams in the 2026–27 season:

- Armex Děčín
- Basket Brno
- Lokomotiva Plzeň
- GAPA Hradec Králové
- KVIS Pardubice
- NH Ostrava
- Opava
- Olomoucko
- SK Slavia Prague ERA NBK
- Sluneta Ústí nad Labem
- Sršni Písek
- USK Praha

== Performance by club ==
Club	Champions	Winning years
Nymburk	22	2004, 2005, 2006, 2007, 2008, 2009, 2010, 2011, 2012, 2013, 2014, 2015, 2016, 2017, 2018, 2019, 2020, 2021, 2022, 2024, 2025, 2026
Opava	5	1997, 1998, 2002, 2003, 2023
USK Praha	3	1993, 2000, 2001
Brno	3	1994, 1995, 1996
Nový Jičín	1	1999

=== All–time national champions ===
Total number of national champions won by Czech clubs. Table includes titles won during the Czechoslovak Basketball League (1929–1993).

Club	Trophies	Years won
Basket Brno	23	1946, 1947, 1948, 1949, 1950, 1951, 1951, 1958, 1962, 1963, 1964, 1967, 1968, 1976, 1977, 1978, 1986, 1987, 1988, 1990, 1994, 1995, 1996
Basketball Nymburk	21	2004, 2005, 2006, 2007, 2008, 2009, 2010, 2011, 2012, 2013, 2014, 2015, 2016, 2017, 2018, 2019, 2021, 2022, 2024, 2025, 2026
USK Praha	14	1965, 1966, 1969, 1970, 1971, 1972, 1974, 1981, 1982, 1991, 1992, 1993, 2000, 2001
Uncas Praha	11	1930, 1931, 1932, 1933, 1934, 1935, 1936, 1937, 1938, 1944, 1945
BK Opava	5	1997, 1998, 2002, 2003, 2023
Dukla Praha	3	1954, 1955, 1956
Žabovřesky	2	1942, 1943
Moravian Slavia Brno	2	1952, 1953
Slovan Orbis Praha	2	1957, 1959
Sparta Praha	2	1940, 1960
Dukla Olomouc	2	1973, 1975
Královo Pole Brno	1	1939
Sokol Pražský	1	1941
BK Pardubice	1	1984
Nový Jičín	1	1999

== Playoff Finals ==
The champion is determined in a playoff, with the bottom two teams getting sent to the 1. liga.

Season	Home court advantage	Result	Home court disadvantage	1st of Regular Season	Record
1993	USK Praha	3–0	Sparta Praha	USK Praha	10–2
1993–94	Tonak Nový Jičín	1–3	Bioveta COOP Banka Brno	Tonak Nový Jičín	11–3
1994–95	Sokol Chán Vyšehrad	1–3	Bioveta COOP Banka Brno	Sokol Chán Vyšehrad	26–6
1995–96	Stavex Brno	3–1	USK Trident Praha	Stavex Brno	27–5
1996–97	Opava	3–1	USK Erpet Praha	Opava	28–4
1997–98	Opava	3–1	Mlékárna Kunín	Opava	30–2
1998–99	Mlékárna Kunín	4–0	USK Erpet Praha	Mlékárna Kunín	28–4
1999–00	Opava	3–4	USK Erpet Praha	Opava	23–9
2000–01	USK Erpet Praha	4–3	Opava	USK Erpet Praha	26–6
2001–02	Mlékárna Kunín	2–4	Opava	Mlékárna Kunín	28–4
2002–03	Opava	4–3	ČEZ Nymburk	Opava	23–9
2003–04	ČEZ Nymburk	4–2	Mlékárna Kunín	ČEZ Nymburk	30–2
2004–05	ČEZ Nymburk	4–1	Mlékárna Kunín	ČEZ Nymburk	30–2
2005–06	ČEZ Nymburk	4–1	Mlékárna Kunín	ČEZ Nymburk	29–3
2006–07	ČEZ Nymburk	3–0	Prostějov	ČEZ Nymburk	41–3
2007–08	ČEZ Nymburk	4–1	Geofin Nový Jičín	ČEZ Nymburk	43–1
2008–09	ČEZ Nymburk	4–0	Geofin Nový Jičín	ČEZ Nymburk	39–1
2009–10	ČEZ Nymburk	4–1	Prostějov	ČEZ Nymburk	40–4
2010–11	ČEZ Nymburk	4–2	Prostějov	ČEZ Nymburk	10–0
2011–12	ČEZ Nymburk	4–0	Prostějov	ČEZ Nymburk	25–1
2012–13	ČEZ Nymburk	4–0	Prostějov	ČEZ Nymburk	23–1
2013–14	ČEZ Nymburk	3–0	Prostějov	ČEZ Nymburk	22–0
2014–15	ČEZ Nymburk	3–0	Děčín	ČEZ Nymburk	21–1
2015–16	ČEZ Nymburk	3–0	Děčín	ČEZ Nymburk	10–1
2016–17	ČEZ Nymburk	82–71 / 70–56	Děčín	ČEZ Nymburk	31–1
2017–18	ČEZ Nymburk	114–90 / 114–73	Opava	ČEZ Nymburk	31–1
2018–19	ČEZ Nymburk	3–0	Armex Děčín	ČEZ Nymburk	32–0
2020–21	ERA Nymburk	2–0	Opava	ERA Nymburk	31–1
2021–22	ERA Nymburk	3–1	Opava	ERA Nymburk	35–1
2022–23	Opava	3–1	Armex Děčín	ERA Nymburk	25–11
2023–24	ERA Nymburk	4–1	Sluneta Ústí nad Labem	ERA Nymburk	28–8
2024–25	ERA Nymburk	4–0	Basket Brno	ERA Nymburk	33–3
2025–26	ERA Nymburk	4–3	Pardubice	ERA Nymburk	21–1

== See also ==
- Česká Basketbalová Federace - The governing body of basketball in the Czech Republic.
- Czech Basketball All-Star Game
- Czechoslovak Basketball League
- Czech Republic Basketball Cup
