= 2004–05 FIBA Europe Cup =

- Season: 2004–05
- Teams: 32

Regular season
- Top seed: 2 November 2004 – 11 April 2005

Finals
- Champions: (Romania) Asesoft Ploiești (1st title)
- Runners-up: (Russia) Lokomotiv Rostov
- Third place: (Russia) Dynamo Moscow Region
- Fourth place: (Turkey) Banvit
- Final Four MVP: (Serbia) Vladimir Kuzmanović

Statistical leaders
Points	(United States) Frederick Warrick	26.4
Rebounds	(United States) Anthony Glover	9.5
Assists	(United States) Levell Sanders	6.8

The 2004–05 FIBA Europe Cup was the third season of the FIBA Europe Cup, Europe's fourth level professional club basketball tournament. The season started on 2 November 2004, and ended on 11 April 2005. A total number of 32 teams participated in the competition.

== Conference West ==
=== Qualifying round ===
==== Group A ====
Pos	Team	Pld	W	L	PF	PA	PD	Pts	Qualification
1	(Denmark) Bakken Bears	6	4	2	474	477	−3	10	Advance to Central Conference play-offs
2	(Iceland) Keflavík	6	3	3	565	545	+20	9	Advance to Central Conference play-offs
3	(Portugal) CAB Madeira	6	3	3	496	521	−25	9	Advance to Central Conference play-offs
4	(France) Reims Champagne	6	2	4	502	494	+8	8	

Source: FIBA Europe

== Conference North ==
=== Qualifying round ===
==== Group A ====
Pos	Team	Pld	W	L	PF	PA	PD	Pts	Qualification
1	(Russia) Dynamo Moscow Region	6	6	0	536	405	+131	12	Advance to conference play-offs
2	(Russia) EvrAz	6	3	3	484	474	+10	9	Advance to conference play-offs
3	(Estonia) Tartu Rock	6	2	4	430	517	−87	8	Advance to conference play-offs
4	(Ukraine) Dnipro	6	1	5	409	463	−54	7	

Source: FIBA Europe

==== Group B ====
Pos	Team	Pld	W	L	PF	PA	PD	Pts	Qualification
1	(Lithuania) Šiauliai	4	3	1	405	363	+42	7	Advance to conference play-offs
2	(Ukraine) Mykolaiv	4	2	2	389	398	−9	6	Advance to conference play-offs
3	(Azerbaijan) Gala Baku	4	1	3	363	396	−33	5	

Source: FIBA Europe

==== Group C ====
Pos	Team	Pld	W	L	PF	PA	PD	Pts	Qualification
1	(Russia) Lokomotiv Rostov	6	6	0	505	389	+116	12	Advance to conference play-offs
2	(Ukraine) Odesa	6	4	2	469	419	+50	10	Advance to conference play-offs
3	(Ukraine) Sumykhimprom Sumy	6	2	4	424	463	−39	8	Advance to conference play-offs
4	(Estonia) Dalkia Nybit	6	0	6	380	507	−127	6	

Source: FIBA Europe

=== Play-offs ===
Quarter-finals
(Russia) Dynamo Moscow Region	97	84	181
(Estonia) Tartu Rock	87	69	156
(Ukraine) Odesa	64	80	144
(Russia) Euras	80	91	171
(Russia) Lokomotiv Rostov	97	91	188
(Ukraine) Sumykhimprom Sumy	86	64	150
(Lithuania) Šiauliai	110	102	212
(Ukraine) Mykolaiv	58	75	133

Semi-finals
16 February – Moscow
(Russia) Dynamo Moscow Region	100
(Russia) Euras	79
16 February – Moscow
(Russia) Lokomotiv Rostov	94
(Lithuania) Šiauliai	57

Final
17 February – Moscow
(Russia) Dynamo Moscow Region	91
(Russia) Lokomotiv Rostov	86
Third place
17 February – Moscow
(Russia) Euras	71
(Lithuania) Šiauliai	86

== Central Conference ==
=== Group A ===
Pos	Team	Pld	W	L	PF	PA	PD	Pts	Qualification
1	(Czech Republic) SCE Děčín	6	6	0	515	421	+94	12	Advance to conference play-offs
2	(Czech Republic) Mlékárna Kunín	6	3	3	450	443	+7	9	Advance to conference play-offs
3	(Switzerland) Benetton Olympic	6	3	3	499	491	+8	9	Advance to conference play-offs
4	(Slovakia) ESO Lučenec	6	0	6	391	500	−109	6	

Source: FIBA Europe

==== Group B ====
Pos	Team	Pld	W	L	PF	PA	PD	Pts	Qualification
1	(Hungary) Albacomp	6	5	1	556	485	+71	11	Advance to conference play-offs
2	(Switzerland) Boncourt	6	3	3	485	542	−57	9	Advance to conference play-offs
3	(Czech Republic) A plus ŽS Brno	6	2	4	521	524	−3	8	
4	(Portugal) Belenenses	6	2	4	499	499	0	8	

Source: FIBA Europe

=== Play-offs ===
Quarter-finals
(Hungary) Albacomp	82	103	185
(Portugal) CAB Madeira	80	74	154
(Denmark) Skovbakken	64	100	164
(Czech Republic) Mlékárna Kunín	90	95	185
(Czech Republic) SCE Děčín	86	80	166
(Switzerland) Boncourt	106	77	183
(Iceland) Keflavík	95	85	180
(Switzerland) Benetton Olympic	103	93	196

Semi-finals
16 February – Fribourg
(Hungary) Albacomp	93
(Czech Republic) Mlékárna Kunín	96
16 February – Fribourg
(Switzerland) Boncourt	91
(Switzerland) Benetton Olympic	84

Final
17 February – Fribourg
(Switzerland) Boncourt	77
(Czech Republic) Mlékárna Kunín	105
Third place
17 February – Fribourg
(Switzerland) Benetton Olympic	71
(Hungary) Albacomp	108

== Conference South ==
=== Qualifying round ===
==== Group A ====
Pos	Team	Pld	W	L	PF	PA	PD	Pts	Qualification
1	(Cyprus) Keravnos Keo	4	4	0	361	314	+47	8	Advance to conference play-offs
2	(Bulgaria) Spartak Euroins	4	2	2	298	321	−23	6	Advance to conference play-offs
3	(Cyprus) Intercollege ETHA Engomis	4	0	4	299	323	−24	4	

Source: FIBA Europe

==== Group B ====
Pos	Team	Pld	W	L	PF	PA	PD	Pts	Qualification
1	(Romania) Dinamo București	4	3	1	389	335	+54	7	Advance to conference play-offs
2	(Cyprus) Dentalcon APOEL	4	3	1	374	357	+17	7	Advance to conference play-offs
3	(Cyprus) ENAD Ayiou Dometiou	4	0	4	306	377	−71	4	

Source: FIBA Europe

==== Group C ====
Pos	Team	Pld	W	L	PF	PA	PD	Pts	Qualification
1	(Romania) Asesoft Ploiești	4	3	1	305	282	+23	7	Advance to conference play-offs
2	(Turkey) Banvit	4	3	1	329	327	+2	7	Advance to conference play-offs
3	(Cyprus) Pizza Express Apollon	4	0	4	307	332	−25	4	Advance to conference play-offs

Source: FIBA Europe

=== Play-offs ===
Quarter-finals
(Cyprus) Keravnos Keo	99	87	186
(Cyprus) Intercollege ETHA	83	71	154
(Cyprus) Dentalcon APOEL	72	86	158
(Turkey) Banvit	89	75	164
(Bulgaria) Spartak Euroins	98	52	150
(Romania) Asesoft Ploiești	81	82	163
(Romania) Dinamo București	73	57	130
(Cyprus) Pizza Express Apollon	80	63	143

Semi-finals
16 February – Ploiești
(Cyprus) Keravnos Keo	74
(Turkey) Banvit	90
16 February – Ploiești
(Cyprus) Pizza Express Apollon	65
(Romania) Asesoft Ploiești	71

Final
17 February – Ploiești
(Turkey) Banvit	71
(Romania) Asesoft Ploiești	68
Third place
17 February – Ploiești
(Cyprus) Keravnos KEO	95
(Cyprus) Pizza Express Apollon	89

== Overall winners ==
- (Denmark) Skovbakken (West)
- (Russia) Dynamo Moscow Region (East)
- (Czech Republic) Mlékárna Kunín (Central)
- (Turkey) Banvit (South)

== Pan-European playoffs ==
In the pan-European play-offs, teams played in two-legged series in the quarterfinals. The Final Four was held in Ploiești from 9 until 10 April 2005.

Quarter-finals
(Hungary) Albacomp	83	65	148
(Russia) Dynamo Moscow Region	73	83	156
(Russia) Lokomotiv Rostov	69	77	146
(Czech Republic) Mlékárna Kunín	68	71	139
(Romania) Asesoft Ploiești	79	74	153
(Switzerland) Boncourt	63	84	147
(Switzerland) Benetton Olympic	85	70	155
(Turkey) Banvit	88	105	193

Semi-finals
9 April – Ploiești
(Russia) Dynamo Moscow Region	63
(Russia) Lokomotiv Rostov	74
9 April – Ploiești
(Turkey) Banvit	69
(Romania) Asesoft Ploiești	83

Final
10 April – Ploiești
(Russia) Lokomotiv Rostov	74
(Romania) Asesoft Ploiești	75
Third place
10 April – Ploiești
(Russia) Dynamo Moscow Region	79
(Turkey) Banvit	45

2004–05 FIBA EuroCup Challenge

CSU Ploiești
1st title

== See also ==
- 2004-05 FIBA Europe League
- 2004-05 ULEB Cup
- 2004-05 Euroleague
