= Fotios Katsikaris =

Greek professional basketball player and coach

Fotios Katsikaris Φώτιος Κατσικάρης
Personal information
- Born: May 16, 1967 (age 59) Nikaia, Athens, Greece
- Listed height: 6 ft 0 in (1.83 m)

Career information
- Playing career: 1982–1998
- Position: Point guard
- Coaching career: 1998–present

Career history

Playing
- 1982–1988: Ionikos Nikaias
- 1988–1990: Sporting Athens
- 1990–1996: AEK Athens
- 1996–1998: Irakleio Crete

Coaching
- 1998–2003: AEK Athens (assistant)
- 2003–2005: AEK Athens
- 2005–2006: Dynamo St. Petersburg
- 2006–2008: Valencia Basket
- 2009–2010: Aris Thessaloniki
- 2010–2013: Bilbao Basket
- 2012–2013: Russia
- 2014–2016: Greece
- 2015–2016: Murcia
- 2016: Lokomotiv Kuban
- 2017: Murcia
- 2017: Hapoel Jerusalem
- 2017–2018: Iberostar Tenerife
- 2018–2019: Utah Jazz (assistant)
- 2019–2020: Gran Canaria
- 2021–2022: Málaga
- 2024: Bàsquet Girona

Career highlights
- As head coach: EuroCup Coach of the Year (2013)

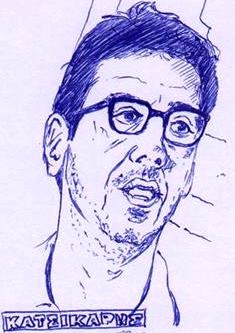
Drawing of Katsikaris

Fotios Katsikaris (alternate spelling: Fotis) (Greek: Φώτιος Κατσικάρης; born 16 May 1967) is a Greek professional basketball coach and a former professional basketball player, he was most recently head coach for the Bàsquet Girona of the Spanish Liga ACB.

Katsikaris has started coaching at the age of 31, following a career as player, and he has worked in Greece, Russia, and Spain. He has also co-operated with the scouting team of the Boston Celtics.

== Playing career ==
Katsikaris began playing basketball in the youth system of Ionikos Nikaias, and was promoted to the senior men's team at the age of 15, setting a record (at the time) for being the youngest player ever in the Greek top division. After some years with Ionikos and Sporting, he made the big step up in his career to AEK Athens, in 1990. A sophisticated pass-first point guard, Katsikaris played for AEK for six seasons, but he didn't manage to win any titles with them. In 1996, he joined Irakleio, where he stayed for two years, before retiring. Throughout his career, he played in a total of 197 games in the top-tier level Greek League, scoring 707 points (3.6 points per game).

While recollecting on his playing years, he's mentioned Panagiotis Giannakis as his role model, Rolando Blackman as his best ever teammate, and Nikos Galis as the most difficult player for him to guard. He's also said that his former coach, Krešimir Ćosić, was the man who changed his life; when Ćosić signed him for AEK, Katsikaris had actually been about to quit basketball (at the age of 23), and go to the United States for studies.

== Club coaching career ==
=== AEK ===
In 1998, Katsikaris joined the coaching staff of AEK Athens. Between 1999 and 2003, he worked as an assistant coach to Dušan Ivković and Dragan Šakota, that period being the most successful for AEK in the recent decades (1 Greek League championship, 2 Greek Cups, and 1 Saporta Cup).

In 2003, he was named head coach as part of a board's project to rebuild the squad with young players, after the glorious and expensive 1999–2003 period. Despite his (and his players') lack of experience, he did quite well, reaching the Greek League playoffs' final, and the EuroLeague Last 16, during the 2004–05 season. Youngsters who evolved into protagonists during his tenure, included future EuroBasket 2005 champions and EuroLeague stars, such as Nikos Zisis and Ioannis Bourousis.

=== Dynamo St. Petersburg ===
In 2005, he moved to Dynamo Saint Petersburg, achieving the 2nd place of the Russian Super League's regular season, and finally finishing 3rd overall in the league after the playoffs. Although the club was then described as "the rising power in Russian basketball", they went bankrupt at the start of the following season, and Katsikaris left Russia.

=== Valencia ===
Right afterwards, in October 2006, he was hired by the Spanish League club Valencia Basket to replace Ricard Casas. The plan was to build a team that could gradually move from mid-table obscurity to a higher level, but the goal wasn't achieved. Two seasons saw Valencia (then called Pamesa after their main sponsor) not proceeding further than the quarterfinals of the Spanish national league, and Katsikaris was fired after a poor start in the Spanish League 2008–09 season.

After leaving Valencia, Katsikaris was rumored by the Greek media as a major candidate for the vacant head coaching job with the senior men's Greek national team; a job that was eventually given to Jonas Kazlauskas.

=== Aris ===
In October 2009, Katsikaris took over Aris Thessaloniki, replacing Andrea Mazzon. The momentum was very difficult for both the club and the coach: Aris had just failed to qualify for the EuroLeague through the preliminary round, and Katsikaris had only a few days' time until the start of the Greek League to re-organize the team.

His tenure lasted exactly 100 days. As the team was obviously underachieving during the first round of the season, including a nightmare defeat at the hands of "eternal enemy" PAOK, he decided to resign in January 2010, saying that he had joined Aris at the wrong time, and couldn't find a way to inspire the players.

=== Bilbao ===
A few days later, Katsikaris returned to the Spanish League to coach Bilbao Basket (or Bizkaia for sponsorship reasons), at the time the second worst team of the 2009–10 Spanish League season, with a record of 4 wins in 17 games. Katsikaris made an instant impact; not only did the team avoid relegation, but they missed the playoffs by just one win, and also reached the EuroCup's 2009–10 Final Four.

The next season was to be even more successful: Bilbao made it to the Spanish League playoffs and reached the finals, defeating Valencia Basket and Real Madrid in the early rounds. Although they eventually lost the title series to Barcelona Basquet, their 2nd-place finish in the post-season was the best position ever for Bilbao, plus it gave them an automatic 2011–12 Euroleague season ticket. In the meantime, Katsikaris signed an extension to his contract until 2014.

Katsikaris was named the 2nd tier level EuroCup's Coach of the Year in 2013.

In July 2015, it was reported that Katsikaris would become the head coach of Murcia, after the EuroBasket 2015, in which Greece took part.

=== Hapoel Jerusalem ===
On June 28, 2017, Katsikaris was hired as the Hapoel Jerusalem head coach. However, on November 9, 2017, Katiskaris was fired by Hapoel Jerusalem due to poor results.

=== Iberostar Tenerife ===
On December 3, 2017, Katsikaris manages his first match with the team of the Canary Islands winning to Real Betis Energía Plus by 87-70.

=== Utah Jazz ===
In summer 2018, Katsikaris was hired by the Utah Jazz as an assistant coach.

=== Gran Canaria ===
On June 26, 2019, he has signed 2-year contract with Herbalife Gran Canaria of the Liga ACB.

=== Unicaja Malaga ===
On January 21, 2021, he has signed with Unicaja Málaga of the Spanish Liga ACB.

=== Bàsquet Girona ===
On January 24, 2024, he joined Bàsquet Girona of the Spanish Liga ACB due to the bad results of the former coach Salva Camps. The team finished 14th at the end of the 2023-2024 season.

== National team coaching career ==
=== Russia ===
Katsikaris became the head coach of the senior men's Russian national basketball team in 2012. He resigned from coaching Russia in 2013, before coaching the team in any tournaments.

=== Greece ===
Katsikaris became the head coach of the senior men's Greek national basketball team in June 2014.

== Season by season results as head coach ==
Abbreviations:
QF; quarter-finals.
DNQ; did not qualify.
HNQ; had not qualified.
System of European eligibility is mainly based on the previous year's performance in domestic competitions.

Club	League	Season	Domestic Competitions		European Competitions	
Club	League	Season	Championship	Cup	Competition	Position
AEK Athens	Greek League	2003–04	4th	QF	EuroLeague	Last 24
AEK Athens	Greek League	2004–05	2nd	QF	EuroLeague	Top 16
Dynamo St. Petersburg	Russian Super League	2005–06	3rd		EuroChallenge	4th
Dynamo St. Petersburg	Russian Super League	2006–07	Released due to club's bankruptcy.			
Valencia	Spanish ACB League	2006–07	QF	DNQ	HNQ	
Valencia	Spanish ACB League	2007–08	QF	QF	EuroCup	QF
Valencia	Spanish ACB League	2008–09	Fired after the first games.			
Aris Thessaloniki	Greek League	2009–10	Resigned in January; team already in Eurocup Last 16.			
Bilbao	Spanish ACB League	2009–10	9th	QF	EuroCup	3rd
Bilbao	Spanish ACB League	2010–11	2nd	QF	HNQ	
Bilbao	Spanish ACB League	2011–12	QF	DNQ	EuroLeague	QF
Bilbao	Spanish ACB League	2012–13	QF	QF	EuroCup	2nd
