= 2019–20 Alpe Adria Cup =

- Season: 2019–20
- Duration: 24 September 2019 – 9 September 2020
- Teams: 16

Finals
- Champions: (Czech Republic) JIP Pardubice (1st title)
- Runners-up: (Czech Republic) Armex Děčín

The 2019–20 Alpe Adria Cup was the fifth edition of this tournament. The final games of Alpe Adria Cup were postponed to September 2020 due to the COVID-19 pandemic. JIP Pardubice won its first title.

== Format ==
Sixteen teams from seven countries joined the competition and were divided into four groups of four teams, where the top two teams from each group will qualify for the quarterfinals.

== Regular season ==
=== Group A ===
Pos	Team	Pld	W	L	PF	PA	PD	Pts	Qualification	PAR	SKR	GLI	KLO
1	(Czech Republic) JIP Pardubice	6	6	0	432	338	+94	12	Advance to quarterfinals	—	88–67	20–0	87–66
2	(Croatia) Adria Oil Škrljevo	6	3	3	395	438	−43	9	Advance to quarterfinals	66–77	—	20–0	94–93
3	(Poland) Gliwice	6	2	4	249	275	−26	8		72–80	107–69	—	0–20
4	(Austria) IMMOunited Dukes	6	1	5	385	410	−25	7		67–80	73–79	66–70	—

Source: Alpe Adria Cup
Legend: Blue = home team win; Red = away team win.

=== Group B ===
Pos	Team	Pld	W	L	PF	PA	PD	Pts	Qualification	GMU	LEV	BRN	POL
1	(Austria) Swans Gmunden	6	5	1	521	453	+68	11	Advance to quarterfinals	—	85–76	88–60	102–71
2	(Slovakia) Levickí Patrioti	6	5	1	511	469	+42	11	Advance to quarterfinals	82–75	—	82–62	93–82
3	(Czech Republic) Egoé Brno	6	1	5	370	420	−50	7		79–84	78–81	—	20–0
4	(Slovenia) Hopsi Polzela	6	1	5	410	470	−60	7		85–87	87–97	85–71	—

Source: Alpe Adria Cup
Legend: Blue = home team win; Red = away team win.

=== Group C ===
Pos	Team	Pld	W	L	PF	PA	PD	Pts	Qualification	OPA	VIE	SEN	KOR
1	(Czech Republic) Opava	6	5	1	602	451	+151	11	Advance to quarterfinals	—	101–69	114–62	116–56
2	(Austria) Hallmann Vienna	6	4	2	550	519	+31	10	Advance to quarterfinals	86–71	—	109–97	110–74
3	(Slovenia) Šenčur	6	2	4	525	558	−33	8		98–100	101–82	—	88–68
4	(Hungary) Egis Körmend	6	1	5	438	587	−149	7		80–100	75–94	85–79	—

Source: Alpe Adria Cup
Legend: Blue = home team win; Red = away team win.

=== Group D ===
Pos	Team	Pld	W	L	PF	PA	PD	Pts	Qualification	SLU	DEC	OSI	GRA
1	(Czech Republic) Sluneta Ústí nad Labem	6	6	0	530	442	+88	12	Advance to quarterfinals	—	76–72	88–82	113–81
2	(Czech Republic) Armex Děčín	6	4	2	502	458	+44	10	Advance to quarterfinals	67–74	—	98–83	79–64
3	(Croatia) Vrijednosnice Osijek	6	2	4	437	435	+2	8		65–75	87–92	—	100–82
4	(Austria) Raiffeissen Graz	6	0	6	376	510	−134	6		75–104	74–94	0–20	—

Source: Alpe Adria Cup
Legend: Blue = home team win; Red = away team win.

== Playoffs ==
Quarter-finals; 22 January – 6 February
(Croatia) Adria Oil Škrljevo	90	78	168
(Austria) Swans Gmunden	76	101	177
(Czech Republic) Armex Děčín	85	83	168
(Czech Republic) Opava	67	87	154
(Austria) Hallmann Vienna	102	90	192
(Czech Republic) Sluneta Ústí nad Labem	95	91	186
(Slovakia) Levickí Patrioti	81	57	138
(Czech Republic) JIP Pardubice	81	78	159

Semi-finals; 26 February-9 March
(Czech Republic) Armex Děčín	96	110	206
(Austria) Swans Gmunden	71	101	172
(Austria) Hallmann Vienna	83	82	165
(Czech Republic) JIP Pardubice	86	85	171

Final; 5-9 September
(Czech Republic) Armex Děčín	96	80	176
(Czech Republic) JIP Pardubice	89	96	185
