= 2021–22 Alpe Adria Cup =

Alpe Adria Cup
- Season: 2021–22
- Duration: 23 September 2021 – 17 March 2022
- Games played: 59
- Teams: 16

Finals
- Champions: (Slovakia) Levickí Patrioti (1st title)
- Runners-up: (Czech Republic) JIP Pardubice
- Semifinalists: (Austria) GGMT Vienna (Slovakia) Spišski Rytieri

The 2021–22 Alpe Adria Cup was the sixth edition of this tournament which is organised after the cancellation of 2020-21 season due to the COVID-19 pandemic. Teams from six central european countries (Austria, Croatia, Czech Republic, Poland, Slovakia and Slovenia) competed this season.

== Teams ==
Location of teams in the 2021–22 Alpe Adria Cup

Regular season
(Slovakia) Spišski Rytieri (1st)	(Austria) Raiffeisen Flyers Wels (4th)	(Croatia) Gorica (4th)	(Czech Republic) JIP Pardubice (6th)
(Slovakia) Levickí Patrioti (2nd)	(Austria) IMMOunited Dukes Klosterneuburg (5th)	(Croatia) Adria Oil Škrljevo (6th)	(Czech Republic) Sluneta Ústí nad Labem (8th)
(Slovakia) Inter Bratislava (4th)	(Austria) GGMT Vienna (7th)	(Croatia) Šibenka (8th)	(Czech Republic) Armex Děčín (10th)
(Slovakia) Prievidza (6th)	(Slovenia) Nutrispoint Ilirija	(Slovenia) Šenčur (5th)	(Poland) MKS Dąbrowa Górnicza (9th)

== Regular season ==
=== Group A ===
Pos	Team	Pld	W	L	PF	PA	PD	Pts	Qualification	LEV	PAR	ŠIB	WEL
1	(Slovakia) Levickí Patrioti	6	5	1	528	415	+113	11	Advance to quarterfinals	—	101–71	94–77	93–64
2	(Czech Republic) JIP Pardubice	6	4	2	394	389	+5	10	Advance to quarterfinals	83–75	—	82–67	79–76
3	(Croatia) Šibenka	6	3	3	415	415	0	9		64–79	20–0	—	104–81
4	(Austria) Raiffeisen Flyers Wels	6	0	6	406	524	−118	6		56–86	50–79	79–83	—

Updated to match(es) played on January 5, 2022. Source: Alpe Adria Cup

=== Group B ===
Pos	Team	Pld	W	L	PF	PA	PD	Pts	Qualification	VIE	ŠEN	INT	DEC
1	(Austria) GGMT Vienna	6	5	1	557	468	+89	11	Advance to quarterfinals	—	104–71	93–76	98–78
2	(Slovenia) Šenčur	6	3	3	520	528	−8	9	Advance to quarterfinals	86–67	—	74–95	101–75
3	(Slovakia) Inter Bratislava	6	2	4	523	519	+4	8		84–86	101–105	—	88–81
4	(Czech Republic) Armex Děčín	6	2	4	473	558	−85	8		73–109	86–83	80–79	—

Source: Alpe Adria Cup

=== Group C ===
Pos	Team	Pld	W	L	PF	PA	PD	Pts	Qualification	SPI	DAB	GOR	KLO
1	(Slovakia) Spišski Rytieri	6	4	2	472	466	+6	10	Advance to quarterfinals	—	92–76	74–72	80–77
2	(Poland) MKS Dąbrowa Górnicza	6	4	2	518	453	+65	10	Advance to quarterfinals	93–85	—	100–80	99–63
3	(Croatia) Gorica	6	3	3	518	497	+21	9		93–69	77–98	—	100–78
4	(Austria) IMMOunited Dukes	6	1	5	407	499	−92	7		55–72	56–52	78–96	—

Source: Alpe Adria Cup

=== Group D ===
Pos	Team	Pld	W	L	PF	PA	PD	Pts	Qualification	ILI	SLU	ŠKR	PRI
1	(Slovenia) Nutrispoint Ilirija	6	5	1	507	449	+58	11	Advance to quarterfinals	—	99–81	87–77	83–74
2	(Czech Republic) Sluneta Ústí nad Labem	6	4	2	489	456	+33	10	Advance to quarterfinals	59–71	—	81–60	102–71
3	(Croatia) Adria Oil Škrljevo	6	2	4	446	474	−28	8		73–84	74–75	—	83–70
4	(Slovakia) Prievidza	6	1	5	458	521	−63	7		85–83	81–91	77–79	—

Source: Alpe Adria Cup

== Playoffs ==
In the playoffs, teams played against each other over two legs on a home-and-away basis, except for the Final Four. In the playoffs draw, the group winners are seeded, and the runners-up are unseeded. The seeded teams are drawn against the unseeded teams, with the seeded teams hosting the second leg.

Quarterfinals
(Slovakia) Levickí Patrioti	83	68	151
(Czech Republic) Sluneta Ústí nad Labem	76	68	144
(Austria) GGMT Vienna	83	88	171
(Poland) MKS Dąbrowa Górnicza	76	91	167
(Slovakia) Spišski Rytieri	88	93	181
(Slovenia) Šenčur	77	86	163
(Slovenia) Nutrispoint Ilirija	86	63	149
(Czech Republic) JIP Pardubice	65	92	157

Semifinals
(Slovakia) Levickí Patrioti	89
(Austria) GGMT Vienna	83
(Slovakia) Spišski Rytieri	78
(Czech Republic) JIP Pardubice	101

Final
(Slovakia) Levickí Patrioti	82
(Czech Republic) JIP Pardubice	63
