= 2018–19 Alpe Adria Cup =

European basketball tournament

- Season: 2018–19
- Duration: 25 September 2018 – 2019
- Teams: 16

Finals
- Champions: (Hungary) Egis Körmend (1st title)
- Runners-up: (Croatia) Adria Oil Škrljevo

The 2018–19 Alpe Adria Cup was the fourth edition of this tournament. The season started on 25 September 2018. Egis Körmend won its first title.

== Format ==
Sixteen teams from seven countries joined the competition and were divided into four groups of four teams, where the top two teams from each group will qualify for the quarterfinals.

== Regular season ==
=== Group A ===
Pos	Team	Pld	W	L	PF	PA	PD	Pts	Qualification	KOR	LEV	DEC	GRA
1	(Hungary) Egis Körmend	6	4	2	543	468	+75	10	Advance to quarterfinals	—	106–81	103–78	101–69
2	(Slovakia) Levickí Patrioti	6	4	2	499	473	+26	10	Advance to quarterfinals	82–79	—	95–67	90–68
3	(Czech Republic) Armex Děčín	6	4	2	486	499	−13	10		87–70	77–70	—	86–76
4	(Austria) Raiffeissen Graz	6	0	6	445	533	−88	6		71–84	76–81	85–91	—

Source: Alpe Adria Cup

=== Group B ===
Pos	Team	Pld	W	L	PF	PA	PD	Pts	Qualification	OSI	USK	POL	TRA
1	(Croatia) Vrijednosnice Osijek	6	4	2	503	441	+62	10	Advance to quarterfinals	—	86–69	110–86	87–61
2	(Czech Republic) USK Praha	6	4	2	478	406	+72	10	Advance to quarterfinals	78–67	—	76–68	87–45
3	(Slovenia) Hopsi Polzela	6	4	2	495	467	+28	10		82–76	93–91	—	84–42
4	(Austria) Traiskirchen Lions	6	0	6	332	494	−162	6		65–77	47–77	72–82	—

Source: Alpe Adria Cup

=== Group C ===
Pos	Team	Pld	W	L	PF	PA	PD	Pts	Qualification	SKR	ZTE	KLO	BRN
1	(Croatia) Adria Oil Škrljevo	6	4	2	467	461	+6	10	Advance to quarterfinals	—	83–75	100–91	78–74
2	(Hungary) ZTE	6	4	2	495	469	+26	10	Advance to quarterfinals	79–72	—	101–86	88–70
3	(Austria) Klosterneuburg Dukes	6	2	4	462	487	−25	8		71–61	72–89	—	66–59
4	(Czech Republic) Egoé Brno	6	2	4	437	444	−7	8		71–73	86–63	77–76	—

Source: Alpe Adria Cup

=== Group D ===
Pos	Team	Pld	W	L	PF	PA	PD	Pts	Qualification	GLI	SLU	SEN	VIE
1	(Poland) Gliwice	6	5	1	568	488	+80	11	Advance to quarterfinals	—	81–83	98–80	95–70
2	(Czech Republic) Sluneta Ústí nad Labem	6	4	2	527	487	+40	10	Advance to quarterfinals	76–78	—	106–79	92–66
3	(Slovenia) Šenčur	6	3	3	545	547	−2	9		87–101	103–77	—	94–66
4	(Austria) Hallmann Vienna	6	0	6	473	591	−118	6		92–115	80–93	99–102	—

Source: Alpe Adria Cup

== Playoffs ==
Quarter-finals; 22 January – 26 February
(Slovakia) Levickí Patrioti	103	87	190
(Croatia) Vrijednosnice Osijek	62	73	135
(Czech Republic) Sluneta Ústí nad Labem	90	75	165
(Croatia) Adria Oil Škrljevo	89	85	174
(Czech Republic) USK Praha	95	53	148
(Hungary) Egis Körmend	87	94	181
(Hungary) ZTE	114	99	213
(Poland) GTK Gliwice	93	128	221

Semi-finals; 4-13 March
(Slovakia) Levickí Patrioti	82	84	166
(Croatia) Adria Oil Škrljevo	76	94	170
(Hungary) Egis Körmend	105	80	185
(Poland) GTK Gliwice	85	81	166

Final; 3-15 April
(Croatia) Adria Oil Škrljevo	76	71	147
(Hungary) Egis Körmend	67	92	159
