= Damonte Dodd =

American basketball player

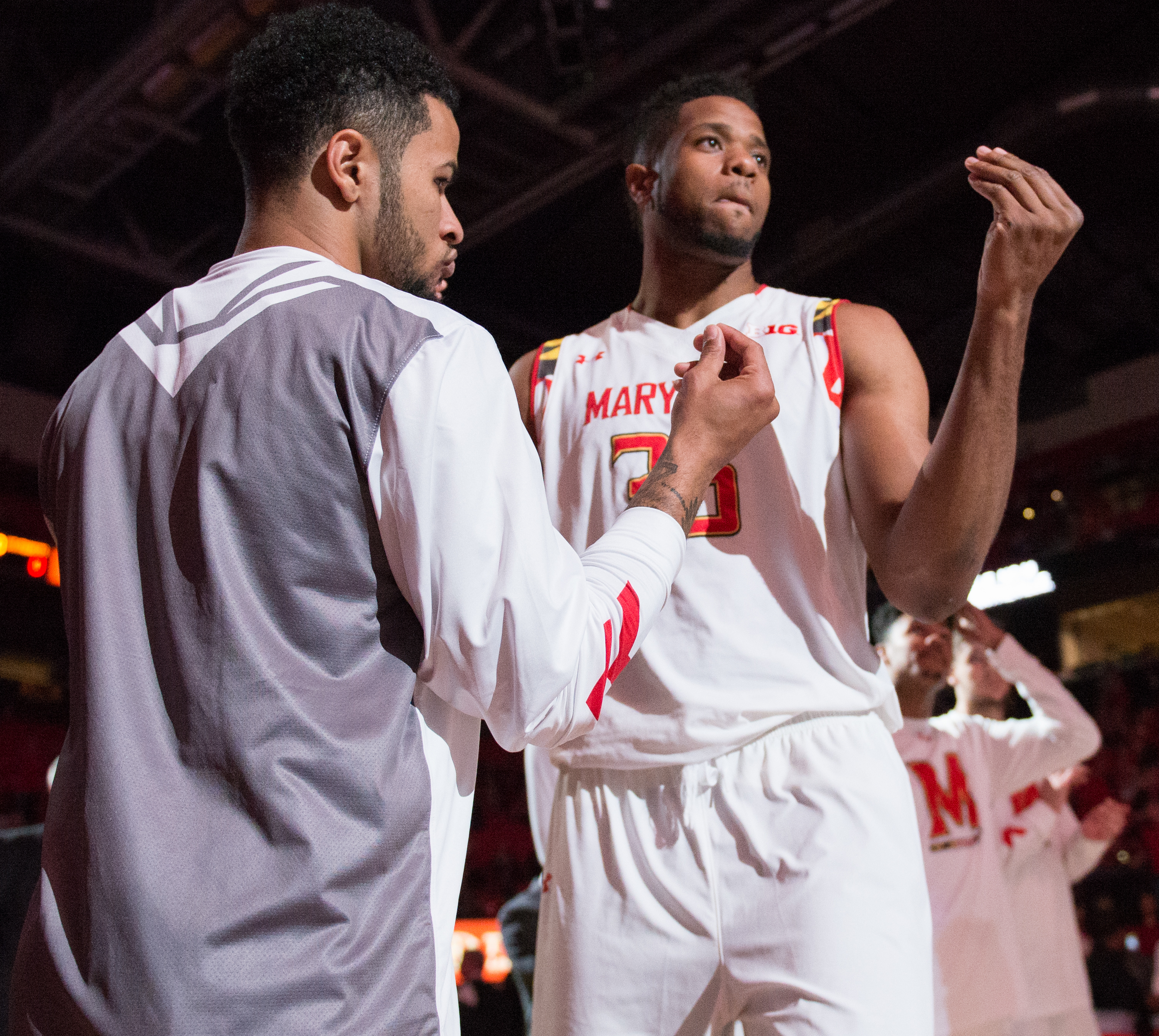
- Dodd (right) for Maryland

No. 35 – Osaka Evessa
- Position: Center
- League: B.League

Personal information
- Born: May 10, 1994 (age 32) Centreville, Maryland, U.S.
- Listed height: 6 ft 11 in (2.11 m)
- Listed weight: 249 lb (113 kg)

Career information
- High school: Queen Anne's County High School (Centreville, Maryland)
- College: Maryland (2013–2017)
- NBA draft: 2017: undrafted
- Playing career: 2017–present

Career history
- 2017: Northern Arizona Suns
- 2017: Maine Red Claws
- 2018: Águilas Doradas de Durango
- 2018–2019: GTK Gliwice
- 2019–2020: Tuři Svitavy
- 2021: BK Děčín
- 2021–2022: GTK Gliwice
- 2022–2023: Vëllaznimi
- 2023–2026: Veertien Mie
- 2026–present: Osaka Evessa

Damonte Dodd (born May 10, 1994) is an American professional basketball player for Osaka Evessa of the Japanese B.League. He played college basketball for the Maryland Terrappins, and ranks number eight on their all-time blocks list.

He grew up in Centreville, Maryland, raised by Angela and Michael Anderson, where he attended Queen Anne's County High School. Before going to the University of Maryland, he went to Massanutten Academy because he “needed to polish his academics and basketball skills.”

After graduating, he played for the Northern Arizona Suns of the NBA G League. Dodd signed with the Polish club GTK Gliwice on August 5, 2018. Dodd began the 2021–22 season with BK Děčín of the Czech league and averaged 8.9 points, 7.1 rebounds, 1.1 assists and 1.2 blocks per game. On November 21, he returned to GTK Gliwice.
