= 2004–05 FIBA Europe League =

FIBA Europe League
- Season: 2004–05
- Teams: 32

Finals
- Champions: (Russia) Dynamo Saint Petersburg; 1st title
- Runners-up: (Ukraine) Kyiv
- Third place: (Russia) Khimki
- Fourth place: (Turkey) Fenerbahçe
- Final Four MVP: (United States) Kelly McCarty

Statistical leaders
Points	(United States) Alvin Young	22.6
Rebounds	(United States) Art Long	11.9
Assists	(United States) Khalid El-Amin	7.2

The 2004–05 FIBA Europe League was the second season of the third tier in European basketball. A total of 32 teams participated in the regular season. BC Dynamo Saint Petersburg won its first FIBA Europe League title.

== Team allocation ==
The number of the teams was increased from 30 to 32 compared to the first season, but this time only 3 were domestic champions while 4 were the runners-up (including Israel). The labels in the parentheses show how each team qualified for the place of its starting round

- 1st, 2nd, etc.: League position after Playoffs
- WC : Wild card
- TH: Title holder

Regular season
(Israel) Hapoel Tel Aviv (2nd)	(France) SIG Strasbourg (7th)	(Turkey) Fenerbahçe (8th)	(Cyprus) EKA AEL Limassol (1st)
(Israel) Strauss Iscar Nahariya (3rd)	(France) JDA Dijon (8th)	(Ukraine) Azovmash (1st)	(Germany) BS Energy Braunschweig (11th)
(Israel) Bnei Hasharon (4th)	(France) Paris Racing Basket (13th)	(Ukraine) Kyiv (2nd)	(North Macedonia) Feršped Rabotnički (1st)
(Israel) Hapoel Galil Elyon (7th)	(Greece) Iraklis (3rd)	(Ukraine) Khimik (4th)	(Netherlands) Demon Ricoh Astronauts (3rd)
(Russia) UNICS (2nd)^{TH}	(Greece) Ionikos N.F. Amaliada (12th)	(Belgium) Verviers-Pepinster (2nd)	(Poland) Anwil Wloclawek (3rd)
(Russia) Ural Great (4th)	(Greece) Olimpia Larissa (WC)	(Belgium) Dexia Mons-Hainaut (5th)	(Federal Republic of Yugoslavia) Lavovi 063 (7th)
(Russia) Khimki (5th)	(Turkey) Beşiktaş (3rd)	(Bulgaria) CSKA Sofia (2nd)	
(Russia) Dynamo Saint Petersburg (WC)	(Turkey) Tuborg Pilsener (5th)	(Czech Republic) ČEZ Nymburk (1st)	

== Qualifying round ==
=== Group A ===
Pos	Team	Pld	W	L	PF	PA	PD	Qualification
1	(Turkey) Fenerbahçe	12	10	2	999	845	+154	Advance to play-offs
2	(Ukraine) Kyiv	12	8	4	1102	1023	+79	Advance to play-offs
3	(Russia) UNICS	12	7	5	1046	963	+83	Advance to play-offs
4	(Czech Republic) ČEZ Nymburk	12	7	5	1063	1051	+12	Advance to play-offs
5	(Israel) Hapoel Galil Elyon	12	6	6	1046	1101	−55	
6	(Bulgaria) CSKA Sofia	12	2	10	978	1060	−82	
7	(North Macedonia) Fersped Rabotnički	12	2	10	922	1113	−191	

Source: FIBA Europe

=== Group B ===
Pos	Team	Pld	W	L	PF	PA	PD	Qualification
1	(Israel) Strauss Iscar Nahariya	14	11	3	1220	1106	+114	Advance to play-offs
2	(Turkey) Beşiktaş	14	9	5	1178	1113	+65	Advance to play-offs
3	(Ukraine) Azovmash Mariupol	14	9	5	1267	1161	+106	Advance to play-offs
4	(France) JDA Dijon	14	7	7	1149	1129	+20	Advance to play-offs
5	(Russia) Ural Great Perm	14	7	7	1136	1152	−16	
6	(Germany) BS Energy Braunschweig	14	6	8	1035	1140	−105	
7	(Greece) Ionikos N.F.	14	4	10	1138	1212	−74	
8	(Belgium) Verviers-Pepinster	14	3	11	1071	1181	−110	

Source: FIBA Europe

=== Group C ===
Pos	Team	Pld	W	L	PF	PA	PD	Qualification
1	(Russia) Khimki	12	9	3	1032	946	+86	Advance to play-offs
2	(Turkey) Tuborg Pilsener	12	9	3	984	909	+75	Advance to play-offs
3	(France) SIG Strasbourg	12	7	5	937	925	+12	Advance to play-offs
4	(Netherlands) Demon Ricoh Astronauts	12	5	7	848	911	−63	Advance to play-offs
5	(Poland) Anwil Włocławek	12	5	7	851	885	−34	
6	(Belgium) Dexia Mons-Hainaut	12	4	8	918	957	−39	
7	(Israel) Bnei Hasharon	12	4	8	895	932	−37	

Source: FIBA Europe

=== Group D ===
Pos	Team	Pld	W	L	PF	PA	PD	Qualification
1	(Russia) Dynamo Saint Petersburg	14	14	0	1200	981	+219	Advance to play-offs
2	(Ukraine) Khimik	14	9	5	1038	984	+54	Advance to play-offs
3	(France) Paris Basket Racing	14	9	5	951	859	+92	Advance to play-offs
4	(Israel) Hapoel Tel Aviv	14	8	6	1068	1036	+32	Advance to play-offs
5	(Cyprus) EKA AEL Limassol	14	8	6	993	998	−5	
6	(Greece) Iraklis	14	3	11	957	1031	−74	
7	(Greece) Olympia Larissa	14	3	11	958	1072	−114	
8	(Serbia and Montenegro) Lavovi 063	14	2	12	556	770	−214	

Source: FIBA Europe

== Play-offs ==
Round of 16
(Turkey) Tuborg Pilsener	1
(Ukraine) Azovmash	2
(Czech Republic) ČEZ Nymburk	0
(Russia) Dynamo St. Petersburg	2
(France) JDA Dijon	0
(Russia) Khimki	2
(Russia) UNICS	2
(Ukraine) Khimik	0
(Netherlands) Demon Ricoh Astronauts	0
(Israel) Strauss Iscar Nahariya	2
(France) Paris Basket Racing	0
(Ukraine) Kyiv	2
(Israel) Hapoel Tel Aviv	0
(Turkey) Fenerbahçe	2
(Turkey) Beşiktaş	2
(France) SIG Strasbourg	1

Quarter-finals
(Ukraine) Azovmash	0
(Russia) Dynamo St. Petersburg	2
(Russia) Khimki	2
(Russia) UNICS	1
(Israel) Strauss Iscar Nahariya	1
(Ukraine) Kyiv	2
(Turkey) Fenerbahçe	2
(Turkey) Beşiktaş	1

Semi-finals
(Russia) Dynamo St. Petersburg	92
(Russia) Khimki	81
(Ukraine) Kyiv	88
(Turkey) Fenerbahçe	72

Final
(Russia) Dynamo St. Petersburg	85
(Ukraine) Kyiv	74
Third place
(Turkey) Fenerbahçe	79
(Russia) Khimki	86

== See also ==
- 2004-05 Euroleague
- 2004-05 ULEB Cup
- 2004–05 FIBA Europe Cup
