= 2008–09 FIBA EuroChallenge =

FIBA EuroChallenge
- Season: 2008–09
- Duration: 25 November 2008 – 26 April 2009
- Teams: 32

Finals
- Champions: (Italy) Virtus Bologna (1st title)
- Runners-up: (France) Cholet
- Third place: (Russia) Triumph Lyubertsy
- Fourth place: (Cyprus) Proteas EKA AEL
- Final Four MVP: (United States) Keith Langford

Statistical leaders
Points	(United States) Austin Nichols	19.6
Rebounds	(Nigeria) Abdullahi Kuso	8.8
Assists	(United States) Dontaye Draper	6.2

The 2008–09 FIBA EuroChallenge was the sixth edition of Europe's third-tier level transnational men's professional club basketball FIBA EuroChallenge Tournament, and the first under the FIBA EuroChallenge name, organized by FIBA Europe. It was also the first season that eliminated teams from the ULEB Cup would transfer to a FIBA competition after the 2000 conflict between ULEB and FIBA. Additionally the formerly known ULEB Cup would be now renamed to EuroCup from 2008 and onwards.

A total number of 32 teams participated in the regular season and a total of 40 teams competed including the qualifying rounds. Virtus Bologna won its first EuroChallenge title after defeating Cholet in the Final of the Final Four, which was hosted in Bologna.

== Format ==
In all there are 40 teams from 21 countries, plus sixteen teams from the 2008–09 Eurocup Basketball first preliminary round and second preliminary round. The competition is jointly run by FIBA Europe.

== Teams ==
The labels in the parentheses show how each team qualified for the place of its starting round (TH: title holders;):

- 1st, 2nd, 3rd, 4th, 5th, etc.: League position after eventual Playoffs
- EC: Transferred from Eurocup

QR: Losers from qualifying rounds

- WC: Wild card

Regular season
(Russia) Ural Great (EC QR2)	(Belgium) Base Oostende (EC QR2)	(Spain) Cajasol (EC QR2)	(Israel) Hapoel Migdal Jerusalim (EC QR2)
(Russia) Triumph Lyubertsy (EC QR1)	(Belgium) Dexia Mons-Hainaut (4th)	(France) Cholet (EC QR1)	(Turkey) Galatasaray (EC QR2)
(Russia) Lokomotiv Rostov (7th)	(Estonia) Tartu Rock (EC QR1)	(Switzerland) Benetton Olympic Fribourg (EC QR2)	(Greece) Olympia Larissa (8th)
(Ukraine) Kyiv (EC QR2)	(Estonia) Kalev/Cramo (2nd)	(Austria) Allianz Swans Gmunden (EC QR2)	(Cyprus) Keravnos (1st)
(Ukraine) Khimik (3rd)	(Lithuania) Šiauliai (EC QR1)	(Germany) Telekom Bonn (EC QR1)	(Italy) Virtus Bologna (15th)
(Poland) Energa Czarni Slupsk (EC QR1)	(Latvia) Ventspils (3rd)	(Netherlands) EclipseJet MyGuide Amsterdam (EC QR1)	

Qualifying rounds
(Russia) CSK VVS-Samara (9th)	(France) Hyeres-Toulon (6th)	(Turkey) Antalya BB (6th)	(Bosnia and Herzegovina) Široki (3rd)
(Russia) Spartak Saint Petersburg (11th)	(France) JA Vichy (7th)	(Turkey) Banvit (8th)	(Bosnia and Herzegovina) Borac Nektar (5th)
(Ukraine) Sumykhimprom (5th)	(Germany) EWE Baskets Oldenburg (5th)	(Cyprus) APOEL (2nd)	(Croatia) Zagreb (4th)
(Ukraine) MBC Mykolaiv (6th)	(Germany) Deutsche Bank Skyliners (6th)	(Cyprus) Proteas EKA AEL (3rd)	(Croatia) Cedevita (5th)
(Ukraine) Donetsk (WC)	(Denmark) Bakken Bears (1st)	(Romania) Asesoft (1st)	(Slovenia) Zlatorog Laško (4th)
(Czech Republic) Prostejov (3rd)	(Denmark) Svendborg Rabbits (2nd)	(Romania) U-Mobilteco Cluj (2nd)	(North Macedonia) AMAK SP (5th)
(Bulgaria) Spartak Pleven (4th)	(Netherlands) Eiffel Towers Den Bosch (2nd)	(Romania) CSU Sibiu (3rd)	
(Georgia (country)) Energy Invest Rustavi (1st)	(Belgium) Belgacom Liege (5th)	(Hungary) Körmend (2nd)	

== Qualifying rounds ==
Thirty-two teams will participate in the first round and sixteen in the second.

=== First qualifying round ===
Team 1	Agg.	Team 2	1st leg	2nd leg
Prostějov (Czech Republic)	134–148	(Croatia) Zagreb	61–69	73–79
AMAK SP (North Macedonia)	148–145	(Slovenia) Zlatorog Laško	70–76	78–69
CSU Asesoft (Romania)	147–145	(Russia) Spartak Saint Petersburg	79–76	68–69
U-Mobitelco Cluj (Romania)	132–163	(Germany) EWE Baskets Oldenburg	60–86	72–77
Svendborg Rabbits (Denmark)	168–180	(Bosnia and Herzegovina) Široki	92–100	76–80
MBC Mykolaiv (Ukraine)	138–151	(Germany) Deutsche Bank Skyliners	68–75	70–76
Energy Invest Rustavi (Georgia (country))	160–200	(Ukraine) Sumykhimprom	81–110	79–90
Spartak Pleven (Bulgaria)	153–176	(Turkey) Antalya BB	83–87	70–89
APOEL (Cyprus)	113–135	(France) JA Vichy	52–66	61–69
Sibiu (Romania)	144–186	(Turkey) Banvit	67–74	77–112
Cedevita (Croatia)	150–157	(France) Hyères-Toulon	92–82	58–75
Körmend (Hungary)	171–201	(Netherlands) EiffelTowers Den Bosch	71–88	100–113
Donetsk (Ukraine)	120–134	(Cyprus) Proteas EKA AEL	65–65	55–79
Bakken Bears (Denmark)	119–164	(Belgium) Belgacom Liège	55–67	64–97

=== Second qualifying round ===
Team 1	Agg.	Team 2	1st leg	2nd leg
EiffelTowers Den Bosch (Netherlands)	166–130	(North Macedonia) AMAK SP	94–66	72–64
Široki (Bosnia and Herzegovina)	155–164	(Ukraine) Sumykhimprom	73–73	82–91
CSK VSS-Samara (Russia)	149–136	(Croatia) Zagreb	80–60	69–76
Deutsche Bank Skyliners (Germany)	127–125	(Turkey) Antalya BB	60–60	67–65
Hyères-Toulon (France)	170–154	(Romania) CSU Asesoft	103–77	67–77
EWE Baskets Oldenburg (Germany)	150–120	(Bosnia and Herzegovina) Borac Nektar	76–46	74–74
Belgacom Liège (Belgium)	154–137	(France) JA Vichy	74–67	80–70
Banvit (Turkey)	165–189	(Cyprus) Proteas EKA AEL	93–100	72–89

== Regular season ==
=== Group A ===
Pos	Team	Pld	W	L	PF	PA	PD	Qualification
1	(Belgium) Belgacom Liège	6	6	0	492	433	+59	Advance to top 16
2	(Spain) Cajasol	6	3	3	480	405	+75	Advance to top 16
3	(Latvia) Ventspils	6	2	4	436	209	+227	
4	(Poland) Energa Czarni Słupsk	6	1	5	462	523	−61	

Source: FIBA Europe

	(Belgium) LIE	(Spain) CAJ	(Latvia) VEN	(Poland) SLU
(Belgium) LIE		69-62	89-84	89-64
(Spain) CAJ	78-79		98-51	89-75
(Latvia) VEN	54-73	78-70		94-88
(Poland) SLU	91-93	53-83	91-75	

=== Group B ===
Pos	Team	Pld	W	L	PF	PA	PD	Qualification
1	(Russia) Ural Great	6	5	1	498	433	+65	Advance to top 16
2	(Germany) Telekom Baskets Bonn	6	3	3	417	413	+4	Advance to top 16
3	(France) Hyères-Toulon	6	3	3	478	485	−7	
4	(Cyprus) Keravnos	6	1	5	434	496	−62	

Source: FIBA Europe

	(Russia) URA	(Germany) TBB	(France) HYE	(Cyprus) KER
(Russia) URA		82-54	84-76	85-64
(Germany) TBB	64-70		71-61	78-55
(France) HYE	94-83	72-86		87-76
(Cyprus) KER	81-94	73-64	85-88	

=== Group C ===
Pos	Team	Pld	W	L	PF	PA	PD	Qualification
1	(France) Cholet	6	6	0	485	410	+75	Advance to top 16
2	(Russia) Lokomotiv Rostov	6	4	2	460	424	+36	Advance to top 16
3	(Ukraine) Sumykhimprom	6	1	5	471	513	−42	
4	(Switzerland) Benetton Olympic	6	1	5	384	453	−69	

Source: FIBA Europe

	(France) CHO	(Russia) LOK	(Ukraine) SUM	(Switzerland) BEN
(France) CHO		76-72	100-77	79-52
(Russia) LOK	65-66		99-72	66-65
(Ukraine) SUM	81-82	84-89		90-73
(Switzerland) BEN	63-82	61-69	70-67	

=== Group D ===
Pos	Team	Pld	W	L	PF	PA	PD	Qualification
1	(Cyprus) Proteas EKA AEL	6	4	2	519	456	+63	Advance to top 16
2	(Netherlands) EiffelTowers Den Bosch	6	4	2	501	480	+21	Advance to top 16
3	(Lithuania) Šiauliai	6	4	2	484	497	−13	
4	(Austria) Allianz Swans Gmunden	6	0	6	428	499	−71	

Source: FIBA Europe

	(Cyprus) AEL	(Netherlands) DEN	(Lithuania) ŠIA	(Austria) GMU
(Cyprus) AEL		95-77	102-76	86-62
(Netherlands) DEN	87-76		96-82	77-70
(Lithuania) ŠIA	77-75	82-80		89-76
(Austria) GMU	77-85	75-84	68-78	

=== Group E ===
Pos	Team	Pld	W	L	PF	PA	PD	Qualification
1	(Germany) EWE Baskets Oldenburg	6	4	2	469	451	+18	Advance to top 16
2	(Netherlands) EclipseJet MyGuide Amsterdam	6	3	3	435	447	−12	Advance to top 16
3	(Israel) Hapoel Jerusalem	6	3	3	397	377	+20	
4	(Greece) Olympia Larissa	6	2	4	357	383	−26	

Source: FIBA Europe

	(Germany) OLD	(Netherlands) AMS	(Israel) JER	(Greece) LAR
(Germany) OLD		78-62	79-70	76-73
(Netherlands) AMS	76-73		73-74	68-64
(Israel) JER	81-88	81-83		20-0*
(Greece) LAR	89-75	77-73	54-71	

*Due to the war situation in Gaza Strip, Olympia refused to travel to Israel and Hapoel Jerusalim were declared winners by forfeit (20-0)

=== Group F ===
Pos	Team	Pld	W	L	PF	PA	PD	Qualification
1	(Belgium) Dexia Mons-Hainaut	6	4	2	514	451	+63	Advance to top 16
2	(Turkey) Galatasaray Cafe Crown	6	4	2	483	447	+36	Advance to top 16
3	(Croatia) Zagreb	6	2	4	443	492	−49	
4	(Ukraine) Khimik	6	2	4	449	499	−50	

Source: FIBA Europe

	(Belgium) DEX	(Turkey) GAL	(Croatia) ZAG	(Ukraine) KHI
(Belgium) DEX		91-65	99-69	82-76
(Turkey) GAL	80-68		87-72	94-51
(Croatia) ZAG	66-84	78-82		88-78
(Ukraine) KHI	95-90	87-75	62-70	

=== Group G ===
Pos	Team	Pld	W	L	PF	PA	PD	Qualification
1	(Italy) Virtus Bologna	6	5	1	472	444	+28	Advance to top 16
2	(Russia) CSK VSS-Samara	6	3	3	440	439	+1	Advance to top 16
3	(Belgium) Base Oostende	6	2	4	490	487	+3	
4	(Estonia) Tartu Rock	6	2	4	451	483	−32	

Source: FIBA Europe

	(Italy) VIR	(Russia) CSK	(Belgium) OOS	(Estonia) TAR
(Italy) VIR		75-69	70-69	95-85
(Russia) CSK	72-70		86-72	58-66
(Belgium) OOS	76-87	98-75		87-73
(Estonia) TAR	73-75	58-80	92-82	

=== Group H ===
Pos	Team	Pld	W	L	PF	PA	PD	Qualification
1	(Russia) Triumph Lyubertsy	6	4	2	441	405	+36	Advance to top 16
2	(Ukraine) Kyiv	6	4	2	440	393	+47	Advance to top 16
3	(Germany) Deutsche Bank Skyliners	6	2	4	375	425	−50	
4	(Estonia) Kalev/Cramo	6	2	4	431	464	−33	

Source: FIBA Europe

	(Russia) TRI	(Ukraine) KYI	(Germany) DBS	(Estonia) KAL
(Russia) TRI		67-64	76-58	75-69
(Ukraine) KYI	66-65		78-46	90-75
(Germany) DBS	77-71	58-66		61-57
(Estonia) KAL	81-87	82-76	77-75	

== Top 16 ==
=== Group I ===
Pos	Team	Pld	W	L	PF	PA	PD	Qualification
1	(France) Cholet	6	5	1	450	408	+42	Advance to quarterfinals
2	(Germany) Telekom Baskets Bonn	6	3	3	415	425	−10	Advance to quarterfinals
3	(Belgium) Belgacom Liège	6	2	4	410	432	−22	
4	(Netherlands) EiffelTowers Den Bosch	6	2	4	433	443	−10	

Source: FIBA Europe

	(France) CHO	(Germany) TBB	(Belgium) LIE	(Netherlands) DEN
(France) CHO		71-54	71-78	85-68
(Germany) TBB	68-71		79-64	84-77
(Belgium) LIE	70-80	59-67		81-68
(Netherlands) DEN	70-72	83-63	67-58	

=== Group J ===
Pos	Team	Pld	W	L	PF	PA	PD	Qualification
1	(Italy) Virtus Bologna	6	4	2	479	444	+35	Advance to quarterfinals
2	(Ukraine) Kyiv	6	4	2	446	399	+47	Advance to quarterfinals
3	(Germany) EWE Baskets Oldenburg	6	3	3	456	470	−14	
4	(Turkey) Galatasaray Cafe Crown	6	1	5	478	546	−68	

Source: FIBA Europe

	(Italy) VIR	(Ukraine) KYI	(Germany) OLD	(Turkey) GAL
(Italy) VIR		68-64	81-82	93-77
(Ukraine) KYI	57-69		64-54	95-62
(Germany) OLD	73-64	73-86		85-93
(Turkey) GAL	91-104	73-80	82-89	

=== Group K ===
Pos	Team	Pld	W	L	PF	PA	PD	Qualification
1	(Cyprus) Proteas EKA AEL	6	5	1	472	421	+51	Advance to quarterfinals
2	(Russia) Ural Great	6	3	3	453	453	0	Advance to quarterfinals
3	(Spain) Cajasol	6	2	4	417	418	−1	
4	(Russia) Lokomotiv Rostov	6	2	4	399	449	−50	

Source: FIBA Europe

	(Cyprus) AEL	(Russia) URA	(Spain) CAJ	(Russia) LOK
(Cyprus) AEL		102-75	88-78	74-60
(Russia) URA	83-57		61-72	69-60
(Spain) CAJ	56-64	76-81		74-61
(Russia) LOK	69-87	86-84	63-61	

=== Group L ===
Pos	Team	Pld	W	L	PF	PA	PD	Qualification
1	(Russia) Triumph Lyubertsy	6	5	1	472	431	+41	Advance to quarterfinals
2	(Netherlands) EclipseJet MyGuide Amsterdam	6	4	2	481	461	+20	Advance to quarterfinals
3	(Belgium) Dexia Mons-Hainaut	6	3	3	495	482	+13	
4	(Russia) CSK VSS-Samara	6	0	6	429	503	−74	

Source: FIBA Europe

	(Russia) TRI	(Netherlands) AMS	(Belgium) DEX	(Russia) CSK
(Russia) TRI		76-75	76-73	86-67
(Netherlands) AMS	68-85		87-75	84-69
(Belgium) DEX	83-68	86-93		101-85
(Russia) CSK	65-81	70-74	73-77	

== Quarterfinals ==
Team 1	Agg.	Team 2	1st leg	2nd leg	3rd leg
Cholet (France)	2–1	(Ukraine) Kyiv	68–52	72–77	80–74
Virtus Bologna (Italy)	2–0	(Germany) Telekom Baskets Bonn	86–76	106–91	
Proteas EKA AEL (Cyprus)	2–0	(Netherlands) EclipseJet MyGuide Amsterdam	82–72	83–72	
Triumph Lyubertsy (Russia)	2–1	(Russia) Ural Great	100–102	91–65	78–63

== Final Four ==
The Final Four will be the last stage of EuroChallenge 2008–09. The event will take place at the Futurshow Station, in Bologna.

Semi-finals
(France) Cholet	81
(Russia) Triumph Lyubertsy	78
(Italy) Virtus Bologna	83
(Cyprus) Proteas EKA AEL	69

Final
(France) Cholet	75
(Italy) Virtus Bologna	77
Third place
(Russia) Triumph Lyubertsy	94
(Cyprus) Proteas EKA AEL	82

== See also ==
- 2008–09 Eurocup Basketball
- 2008–09 Euroleague
