= 2023–24 Alpe Adria Cup =

Alpe Adria Cup
- Season: 2023–24
- Teams: 11

Finals
- Champions: (Poland) MKS Dąbrowa Górnicza (2nd title)
- Runners-up: (Romania) WS Mozzart Bet Timișoara
- Semifinalists: (Austria) OSC Capital Bulls (Czech Republic) Redstone Olomoucko

Records
- Winning streak: 5 games WS Mozzart Bet Timișoara

The 2023–24 Alpe Adria Cup is the 8th edition of the Alpe Adria Cup, an annual professional basketball competition. 11 teams from central European countries (Austria, Croatia, Czech Republic, Poland, Romania, Slovakia and Slovenia) competed this season.

== Teams ==
1st, 2nd, etc.: Place in the domestic competition.

TH: Title holder.

Regular season
(Czech Republic) Sluneta Ústí nad Labem (6th)	(Austria) GGMT Vienna (2nd)	(Croatia) Dinamo Zagreb (7th)	(Slovakia) Spišski Rytieri (3rd)
(Czech Republic) Geosan Kolín (9th)	(Austria) OSC Capital Bulls (8th)	(Poland) Dabrowa Gornicza (12th)^{TH}	(Slovenia) Ilirija* (5th)
(Czech Republic) Redstone Olomoucko (11th)	(Croatia) Dubrava (6th)	(Romania) WS Mozzart Bet Timișoara (6th)	

*KK Ilirija had also played qualification tournament for the 2023-24 ABA League second division, but lost in the semifinal.

== Regular season ==
=== Group A ===
Pos	Team	Pld	W	L	PF	PA	PD	Pts	Qualification	DAB	OSC	SLU	DIN	SPI
1	(Poland) MKS Dąbrowa Górnicza	8	6	2	754	717	+37	14	Advance to Final Four	—	99–73	102–98	92–73	122–102
2	(Austria) OSC Capital Bulls	8	4	4	700	715	−15	12	Advance to Final Four	74–95	—	87–79	95–79	98–79
3	(Czech Republic) Sluneta Ústí nad Labem	8	4	4	705	702	+3	12		79–84	99–94	—	81–73	89–82
4	(Croatia) Dinamo Zagreb	8	3	5	690	686	+4	11		124–68	91–94	80–93	—	91–86
5	(Slovakia) Spišskí Rytieri	8	3	5	714	743	−29	11		94–92	94–85	100–87	77–79	—

Source: Alpe Adria Cup

=== Group B ===
Pos	Team	Pld	W	L	PF	PA	PD	Pts	Qualification	TIM	OLO	ILI	VIE	DUB	KOL
1	(Romania) WS Mozzart Bet Timișoara	10	8	2	898	809	+89	18	Advance to Final Four	—	85–76	97–85	106–90	87–69	90–84
2	(Czech Republic) Redstone Olomoucko	10	6	4	871	825	+46	16	Advance to Final Four	71–81	—	85–76	100–84	89–77	113–88
3	(Slovenia) Ilirija	10	5	5	894	890	+4	15		92–81	86–71	—	121–101	80–74	91–97
4	(Austria) GGMT Vienna	10	4	6	941	973	−32	14		87–92	94–92	113–102	—	94–74	116–107
5	(Croatia) Dubrava	10	4	6	800	805	−5	14		78–72	88–91	91–72	89–74	—	79–81
6	(Czech Republic) Geosan Kolín	10	3	7	835	937	−102	13		77–107	66–83	80–89	90–88	65–81	—

Source: Alpe Adria Cup

== Final Four ==
Semifinals; March 12
(Poland) MKS Dąbrowa Górnicza	101
(Czech Republic) Redstone Olomoucko	94
(Romania) WS Mozzart Bet Timișoara	94
(Austria) OSC Capital Bulls	92

Final; March 13
(Poland) MKS Dąbrowa Górnicza	90
(Romania) WS Mozzart Bet Timișoara	88
