= Isaac Davidson =

New Zealand basketball player (born 1997)

Pardubice
- Position: Small forward / shooting guard
- League: NBL

Personal information
- Born: 22 June 1997 (age 29) Auckland, New Zealand
- Listed height: 2.02 m (6 ft 8 in)
- Listed weight: 100 kg (220 lb)

Career information
- High school: Rangitoto College (Auckland, New Zealand)
- College: Sonoma State (2016–2020)
- NBA draft: 2020: undrafted
- Playing career: 2020–present

Career history
- 2020–2024: Franklin Bulls
- 2020–2023: New Zealand Breakers
- 2023–2024: Bisons Loimaa
- 2024–2025: Děčín
- 2025–2026: Sluneta Ústí nad Labem
- 2026: Auckland Tuatara
- 2026–present: Pardubice

Career highlights
- 2× Second-team All-CCAA (2019, 2020)
Medals
Men's basketball
Representing New Zealand
FIBA Asia Cup
Bronze medal – third place	2022 Jakarta

Isaac Toa Davidson (born 22 June 1997) is a New Zealand professional basketball player for Pardubice of the Czech National Basketball League (NBL). He has represented the New Zealand national team internationally.

== Early life ==
Davidson was born and raised in Auckland, New Zealand. He graduated from Rangitoto College, where he served as captain of the school's basketball team. He played for the Waitakere West Auckland Basketball Club.

== College career ==
Davidson played four years of college basketball in the United States for the Sonoma State Seawolves between 2016 and 2020. He was named second-team All-CCAA in 2018–19 and 2019–20.

== Professional career ==
Davidson joined the Franklin Bulls of the New Zealand National Basketball League for the 2020 season.

In December 2020, Davidson signed a three-year deal with the New Zealand Breakers of the Australian National Basketball League (NBL), with the first two years as a development player and then the third year as a club option. He played 11 games for the Breakers during the 2020–21 NBL season.

Davidson returned to the Bulls for the second half of the 2021 New Zealand NBL season.

In October 2021, Davidson was elevated to the Breakers' full roster for the 2021–22 NBL season. He appeared in four games during the season.

Davidson returned to the Bulls for the 2022 New Zealand NBL season.

Davidson returned to the Breakers in 2022–23 for a third season, but appeared in just one game.

Davidson played his fourth season for the Bulls in 2023.

In July 2023, Davidson signed with Bisons Loimaa of the Finnish Korisliiga for the 2023–24 season.

Davidson played his fifth season for the Bulls in 2024.

In September 2024, Davidson signed with Děčín of the Czech National Basketball League.

In November 2025, Davidson signed with Sluneta Ústí nad Labem of the Czech NBL.

On 11 March 2026, Davidson signed with the Auckland Tuatara for the 2026 New Zealand NBL season.

In October 2026, Davidson signed with Pardubice of the Czech NBL.

== National team career ==
Davidson played for New Zealand at the 2013 FIBA Oceania U16 Championship. In 2014, he represented New Zealand in 3x3 basketball at the 2014 Summer Youth Olympics.

In 2022, Davidson debuted for the New Zealand Tall Blacks at the 2022 FIBA Asia Cup in Jakarta, where he helped the team win the bronze medal.

== Personal life ==
Davidson is of Samoan descent. His sister, Penina, is also a professional basketball player.

== Career statistics ==
=== National team ===
Team	Tournament	Pos.	GP	PPG	RPG	APG
New Zealand	2022 FIBA Asia Cup	3rd	7	2.7	2.1	1.3
