= Kamil Švrdlík =

Czech basketball player (born 1986)

No. 9 – BK Pardubice
- Position: Center
- League: NBL

Personal information
- Born: November 25, 1986 (age 39) Přerov, Czechoslovakia
- Listed height: 6 ft 9 in (2.06 m)
- Listed weight: 237 lb (108 kg)

Career information
- College: Fairleigh Dickinson (2008–2011)
- NBA draft: 2011: undrafted
- Playing career: 2004–present

Career history
- 2004–2008: SKB Zlín
- 2011–2014: Prostějov
- 2014–2015: İstanbul DSİ
- 2015: Prostějov
- 2015–present: BK Pardubice

Kamil Švrdlík (born November 25, 1986) is a Czech basketball player for BK Pardubice and the Czech national team.

He participated at the EuroBasket 2017.
