= 2015–16 National Basketball League (Czech Republic) season =

Kooperativa NBL^{1}
- Games played: 42 (regular season)
- Teams: 12

Finals
- Champions: ČEZ Nymburk (13th title)
- Runners-up: Armex Děčín
- Third place: JIP Pardubice
- Fourth place: Ariete Prostějov
- ^{1} Sponsored league name.

The 2015–16 National Basketball League (Czech Republic) season was the 23rd season of the Czech NBL. The season started on October 10, 2015.

== Regular season ==
Pos	Team	Pld	W	L	PF	PA	PD	PCT	Qualification or relegation
1	ČEZ Nymburk	11	10	1	956	695	+261	.909	Qualification to playoffs
2	Armex Děčín	41	30	11	3341	3029	+312	.732	Qualification to playoffs
3	Ariete Prostějov	41	29	12	3488	3175	+313	.707	Qualification to playoffs
4	Opava	41	26	15	3442	3268	+174	.634	Qualification to playoffs
5	JIP Pardubice	41	26	15	3573	3194	+379	.634	Qualification to playoffs
6	Geosan Kolín	41	21	20	3388	3436	−48	.512	Qualification to playoffs
7	USK Praha	41	19	22	2973	2964	+9	.463	Qualification to playoffs
8	Bohemilk Tuři Svitavy	41	17	24	3103	3533	−430	.415	Qualification to playoffs
9	NH Ostrava	41	17	24	2969	3102	−133	.415	
10	Sluneta	41	15	26	3188	3380	−192	.366	
11	mmcité Brno	41	11	30	2997	3373	−376	.268	
12	Lions Jindřichův Hradec	41	10	31	3160	3543	−383	.244	Relegation play-offs

Source: NBL

== Playoffs ==
Quarterfinals
1	ČEZ Nymburk	3
8	Bohemilk Tuři Svitavy	0
4	Opava	1
5	JIP Pardubice	3
2	Armex Děčín	3
7	USK Praha	1
3	Ariete Prostějov	3
6	Geosan Kolín	1

Semifinals
1	ČEZ Nymburk	3
5	JIP Pardubice	0
2	Armex Děčín	3
3	Ariete Prostějov	1

Finals
1	ČEZ Nymburk	3
2	Armex Děčín	0
Third place
3	Ariete Prostějov	0
5	JIP Pardubice	2

== Czech clubs in European competitions ==
Team	Competition	Progress
ČEZ Nymburk	FIBA Europe Cup	Top 32

== Czech clubs in Regional competitions ==
Team	Competition	Progress
ČEZ Nymburk	VTB United League	Quarterfinals
