= BC Dynamo Saint Petersburg =

Dynamo Saint Petersburg
- Founded: 2004
- Dissolved: 2006
- History: Dynamo Saint Petersburg (2004–2006)
- Arena: Yubileyny Sports Palace
- Capacity: 7,700
- Location: Saint Petersburg, Russia
- Championships: 1 FIBA Europe League
Home	Away

BC Dynamo Saint Petersburg was a Russian professional basketball club based in Saint Petersburg, that existed for two seasons. The club was founded in 2004 and dissolved in 2006. In the 2004–05 season, the club won the FIBA Europe League.

== History ==
=== 2004–05 season ===
Dynamo Saint Petersburg was created during the 2004 summer when Vladimir Rodionov, owner of Avtodor Saratov, transferred Saratov's place in the first-tier Russian Super League to the club, along with some of its best players such as Vladimir Veremeenko. The club - which had the aim of entering the Super League top four and qualifying for European competitions such as the ULEB Cup and EuroLeague - recruited coach David Blatt and players like Kelly McCarty, Ed Cota, Ognjen Aškrabić, Jón Stefansson and David Bluthenthal (who left after two months). It finished the European third-tier 2004–05 FIBA Europe League unbeaten to win the competition after downing BC Kyiv in the final with 24 points from Final Four MVP McCarty. Domestically the club, at one point second in the league, finished fifth in the regular season before losing in the playoff quarterfinals to BC Khimki, a team they had beaten in the Europe League semifinal.

=== 2005–06 season ===
The 2005–06 season saw a roster overhaul as Blatt left for Italians Benetton Treviso, Fotis Katsikaris was brought in to replace him and Cota and Stefánsson were substituted by Jerry McCullough, Damir Miljković and veteran Darryl Middleton.

Defending their title in the FIBA EuroCup (the renamed FIBA Europe League), Dynamo was on the brink of elimination at the second group stage after three defeats in four games. But the Russians rallied to first beat CEZ ČNymburk and then Fenerbahçe by the 3 points needed to squeeze through to the quarterfinals on overall points difference. In the quarterfinals, they easily swept Maroussi thanks to McCarthy's good form to reach the Final Four again. They could not repeat the previous year's achievement however as they lost their semifinal rematch to Khimki before falling to BC Kyiv in the third place game.

In the Russian Super League, Dynamo beat holders CSKA Moscow 62–61 in January, and rivals Khimki 81–69 in March, on their way to the second place in the regular season but were again foiled by Khimki in the playoffs, at the semifinals stage.

=== Dissolution in 2006 ===
The club started preparations for the 2006–07 season, nominating Yuri Selikhov as coach to replace the departing Fotios Katsikaris, and registering for the ULEB Cup, but it unexpectedly withdrew from all competitions and folded on 6 October 2006. Despite announcing a budget of $6 million for 2005–06, Dynamo and its president reportedly made the decision after the city authorities stopped funding the club to the tune of more than $5 million (wanting a merger with Spartak Saint Petersburg). With their other major sponsor (one of the largest banks in Russia) poised to follow, the club used the bankruptcy to get out of its onerous player contracts.

== Season by season ==
Season	Tier	League	Pos.	Russian Cup	European competitions	
2004–05	1	Super League	5th	Quarterfinals	3 Europe League	C
2005–06	1	Super League	3rd	Quarterfinals	4 FIBA EuroCup	4th

== Honours ==
- FIBA Europe League
  - Champions (1): 2004–05

== Notable players ==
Note: Flags indicate national team eligibility at FIBA-sanctioned events. Players may hold other non-FIBA nationalities not displayed.

Criteria

To appear in this section a player must have either:

- Set a club record or won an individual award while at the club
- Played at least one official international match for their national team at any time
- Played at least one official NBA match at any time.

2006 (Note: Due to the club folding, never played an official game for Dynamo)

- (United States) Eddie Gill preseason: '06
- (Montenegro) Goran Jeretin preseason: '06
- (Poland) Maciej Lampe preseason: '06

2005

- (United States) Darryl Middleton 1 season: '05–'06
- (United States) Jerry McCullough 1 season: '05–'06
- (Ukraine) Grigorij Khizhnyak 1 season: '05–'06
- (Russia) Victor Keyru 1 season: '05–'06

2004

- (United States) Kelly McCarty 2 seasons: '04–'06
- (Belarus) Vladimir Veremeenko 2 seasons: '04–'06
- (Serbia) Ognjen Aškrabić 2 seasons: '04–'06
- (Iceland) Jón Arnór Stefánsson 1 season: '04–'05
- (Panama) Ed Cota 1 season: '04–'05
- (Israel) David Bluthenthal 1/2 season: '04

== Head coaches ==
- (United States) (Israel) David Blatt 1 season: '04–'05
- (Greece) Fotios Katsikaris 1 season: '05–'06
- (Russia) Yuri Selikhov preseason: '06
