= 2014–15 National Basketball League (Czech Republic) season =

Kooperativa NBL^{1}
- Duration: September 22, 2014 – May 20, 2015
- Games played: 42 (regular season)
- Teams: 12

Regular season
- Top seed: ČEZ Nymburk
- Relegated: –

Finals
- Champions: ČEZ Nymburk; 12th title
- Runners-up: Děčín
- Third place: Prostejov
- Fourth place: Opava

Statistical leaders
Points	(United States) Darryl Bryant	19.4
Rebounds	(United States) Cory Abercrombie	8.1
Assists	(Czech Republic) Michal Sotnar	5.6
- ^{1} Sponsored league name.

The 2014–15 National Basketball League (Czech Republic) season was the 22nd season of the Czech NBL. The season started on September 22, 2014 and ended on May 20, 2015. ČEZ Nymburk won its 12th title in a row, runners-up Děčín were defeated 3–0 in the Finals.

== Regular season ==
Pos	Team	Pld	W	L	PF	PA	PD	Pts	Qualification
1	ČEZ Nymburk	22	21	1	1918	1514	+404	42	Qualification to playoffs
2	Děčín	42	32	10	3392	3065	+327	64	Qualification to playoffs
3	Prostejov	42	31	11	3648	3272	+376	62	Qualification to playoffs
4	JIP Pardubice	42	29	13	3603	3345	+258	58	Qualification to playoffs
5	Opava	42	22	20	3321	3188	+133	44	Qualification to playoffs
6	Sluneta	42	19	23	3338	3462	−124	38	Qualification to playoffs
7	Nova Hut Ostrava	42	18	24	3213	3240	−27	36	Qualification to playoffs
8	Lions Jindřichův Hradec	44	19	25	3522	3705	−183	38	Qualification to playoffs
9	Unikol Kolín	42	15	27	3164	3415	−251	30	
10	Tuři Svitavy	42	15	27	3167	3421	−254	30	
11	USK Prague	42	13	29	2968	3167	−199	26	
12	Brno	42	10	32	3088	3521	−433	20	Relegation play-offs

Source: OddsPortal.com

== Results ==
=== Rounds 1-22 ===
Home \ Away	CEZ	BRN	DEC	HRA	KOL	OPA	OST	PAR	USK	PRO	TUR	UST
ČEZ Nymburk		99–66	74–66	90–67	108–81	75–54	80–68	86–85	68–48	83–75	94–71	85–66
BC Brno	62–88		74–72	70–78	57–76	69–93	79–73	74–82	80–74	66–91	74–83	74–90
BK Děčín	62–94	91–62		97–81	75–59	78–77	76–55	93–78	77–63	91–75	83–67	90–72
Lions Jindřichův Hradec	88–105	91–67	86–88		85–90	81–78	76–61	98–97	76–58	85–88	71–83	97–113
BC Kolín	73–84	79–64	76–78	84–86		72–76	64–69	82–88	73–58	79–70	81–69	73–80
BK Opava	60–81	93–81	67–78	90–94	85–68		73–63	101–77	89–84	88–70	98–74	85–58
Nova Hut Ostrava	78–89	95–73	75–84	64–69	99–66	67–81		81–87	66–61	78–75	99–80	89–66
JIP Pardubice	75–88	87–72	79–70	101–84	66–64	102–74	84–71		88–84	102–94	103–74	77–74
USK Praha	55–69	76–64	64–74	68–78	80–76	61–63	76–78	72–76		108–100	86–66	67–63
BK Prostějov	111–101	105–77	87–72	117–93	103–75	81–67	93–77	86–81	79–70		69–68	92–66
Tuři Svitavy	75–92	80–71	63–78	89–97	94–64	87–76	70–67	79–86	66–65	73–64		74–80
SLUNETA Ústí nad Labem	55–85	99–94	74–86	91–85	83–66	90–76	87–80	99–92	82–86	87–100	86–99	

Legend: Blue = home team win; Yellow = draw; Red = away team win.

=== Rounds 23-42 ===
Home \ Away	CEZ	BRN	DEC	HRA	KOL	OPA	OST	PAR	USK	PRO	TUR	UST
ČEZ Nymburk												
BC Brno			73–79	82–68	108–86	82–78	93–87	77–78	72–61	68–87	78–75	69–77
BK Děčín		92–73		86–83	86–73	82–65	86–66	72–59	81–62	74–82	86–63	102–62
Lions Jindřichův Hradec		110–99	81–83		95–82	90–74	106–108	91–116	76–86	81–108	88–80	83–80
BC Kolín		88–71	71–68	106–86		94–85	84–70	70–64	81–75	89–98	77–76	87–74
BK Opava		83–67	73–77	100–68	85–74		59–66	102–86	78–54	48–62	103–59	77–86
Nova Hut Ostrava		92–85	88–67	94–84	88–72	84–69		79–89	79–57	70–86	91–84	67–60
JIP Pardubice		85–58	92–87	99–71	94–50	83–67	89–73		86–74	83–98	88–75	98–82
USK Praha		72–56	74–83	84–80	69–66	58–64	69–56	78–80		77–71	75–60	81–92
BK Prostějov		82–69	76–91	85–77	87–60	79–92	78–69	83–72	87–58		97–71	100–69
Tuři Svitavy		73–62	72–77	78–85	82–55	69–97	76–69	90–82	90–74	65–91		80–72
SLUNETA Ústí nad Labem		73–76	75–74	86–73	97–78	83–91	71–70	68–87	78–66	82–86	90–65	

Legend: Blue = home team win; Yellow = draw; Red = away team win.

== Playoffs ==
Quarterfinals
1	ČEZ Nymburk	3
8	Lions Jindřichův Hradec	0
4	JIP Pardubice	1
5	Opava	3
2	Děčín	3
7	Nova Hut Ostrava	2
3	Prostejov	3
6	SLUNETA Ústí nad Labem	1

Semifinals
1	ČEZ Nymburk	3
5	Opava	0
2	Děčín	3
3	Prostejov	2

Finals
1	ČEZ Nymburk	3
2	Děčín	0
Third place
3	Prostejov	2
5	Opava	1

== Czech clubs in European competitions ==
Team	Competition	Progress
ČEZ Nymburk	EuroCup	Top 32

== Czech clubs in Regional competitions ==
Team	Competition	Progress
ČEZ Nymburk	VTB United League	15th
