= Orli Prostějov =

- League: NBL
- Founded: 1940
- Dissolved: 2017
- History: BK Prostějov (1940–2013); Orli Prostějov (2013–2017)
- Arena: Sportcentrum - DDM
- Capacity: 2,100
- Location: Prostějov, Czech Republic
- Team colors: White and Blue
- Championships: 1 Czech Cup
- Website: www.orliprostejov.cz
Home	Away

Orli Prostějov was a professional basketball club from Prostějov, Czech Republic. The club played in the NBL, the first tier of Czech basketball. In 2015, Prostějov won its first trophy in the Czech Republic Basketball Cup. In 2017, the team was declared bankrupt and left the NBL. They were replaced by a new established club in the city BK Olomoucko.

== Trophies ==
- Czech Republic Basketball Cup

Winners (1): 2014–15

== Season by season ==
The logo of Ariete Prostějov

Season	Tier	League	Pos.	Czech Cup	European competitions		
2003–04	2	Division II	1st				
2004–05	1	NBL	3rd				
2005–06	1	NBL	3rd		4 EuroCup Challenge	RS	0–4
2006–07	1	NBL	5th		4 EuroCup Challenge	QF	5–3
2007–08	1	NBL	3rd				
2008–09	1	NBL	4th		3 EuroChallenge	QR1	0–2
2009–10	1	NBL	2nd				
2010–11	1	NBL	2nd	Fourth place	3 EuroChallenge	T16	7–5
2011–12	1	NBL	2nd	Fourth place	2 Eurocup	QR	0–2
2011–12	1	NBL	2nd	Fourth place	3 EuroChallenge	RS	3–3
2012–13	1	NBL	2nd	Fourth place			
2013–14	1	NBL	2nd	Runner-up			
2014–15	1	NBL	3rd	Champion			
2015–16	1	NBL	4th	Quarterfinalist			
2016–17	1	NBL	12th	Fourth place			

== Players ==
=== Current roster ===
Note: Flags indicate national team eligibility at FIBA-sanctioned events. Players may hold other non-FIBA nationalities not displayed.

BK Prostějov roster
Players
Coaches

Pos.	No.	Nat.	Name	Ht.
SF	4	(Slovakia)	Pandula, Dušan	1.96 m (6 ft 5 in)
SG	5	(Czech Republic)	Bratčenkov, Vojtěch	1.98 m (6 ft 6 in)
SF	6	(Czech Republic)	Pekárek, David	1.97 m (6 ft 6 in)
SF	7	(Czech Republic)	Šmíd, Filip	1.94 m (6 ft 4 in)
PG	8	(Slovakia)	Marko, Roman	1.94 m (6 ft 4 in)
C	9	(Czech Republic)	Švrdlík, Kamil	2.06 m (6 ft 9 in)
PG	10	(Czech Republic)	Slezák, Pavel	1.86 m (6 ft 1 in)
SG	11	(Czech Republic)	Bohačík, Jaromír	1.97 m (6 ft 6 in)
PF	12	(Czech Republic)	Kohout, Ondřej	2.04 m (6 ft 8 in)
SF	13	(Czech Republic)	Polášek, Rudolf	2.00 m (6 ft 7 in)
PF	14	(Czech Republic)	Prášil, Jaroslav	2.00 m (6 ft 7 in)

Head coach

- (Czech Republic) Zbyněk Choleva

Assistant coach(es)

- (Czech Republic) David Hájek

Legend

- (C) Team captain
- Injured

- Roster

=== Notable players ===
Note: Flags indicate national team eligibility at FIBA-sanctioned events. Players may hold other non-FIBA nationalities not displayed.

Criteria

To appear in this section a player must have either:

- Set a club record or won an individual award while at the club
- Played at least one official international match for their national team at any time
- Played at least one official NBA match at any time.

- (Germany) Hurl Beechum
