= 2010–11 FIBA EuroChallenge =

FIBA EuroChallenge
- Season: 2010–11
- Duration: 29 April 2010 – 1 May 2011
- Teams: 32

Finals
- Champions: (Slovenia) Krka Novo mesto (1st title)
- Runners-up: (Russia) Lokomotiv Kuban
- Third place: (Belgium) Telenet Oostende
- Fourth place: (Russia) Spartak St. Petersburg
- Final Four MVP: (Bosnia and Herzegovina) Goran Ikonić

Statistical leaders
Points	(United States) Ben Woodside	18.5
Rebounds	(Canada) Kyle Landry	9.6
Assists	(United States) Ben Woodside	5.5

2010–11 FIBA EuroChallenge was the eighth edition of Europe's third-tier level transnational men's professional club basketball FIBA EuroChallenge Tournament, organized by FIBA Europe. The Final Four was awarded to Oostende and was held from April 29 to May 1, 2011.

== Teams ==
The labels in the parentheses show how each team qualified for the place of its starting round.

- 1st, 2nd, 3rd, 4th, 5th, etc.: League position after eventual Playoffs
- EC: Losers of the 2010–11 Eurocup Basketball qualifying round

Regular season
(Russia) Dynamo Moscow (4th)^{EC}	(Belgium) Belgacom Liège (2nd)^{EC}	(Croatia) Zadar (2nd)	(Latvia) Ventspils (3rd)
(Russia) Lokomotiv–Kuban (5th)	(Belgium) Telenet Oostende (3rd)	(Croatia) Zagreb CO (4th)^{EC}	(Estonia) Tartu Ülikool/Rock (1st)
(Russia) Spartak Saint Petersburg (6th)^{EC}	(France) Gravelines Dunkerque (4th)	(Cyprus) APOEL (1st)^{EC}	(Bulgaria) Lukoil Academic (1st)^{EC}
(Germany) Deutsche Bank Skyliners (2nd)^{EC}	(France) Entente Orléanaise (6th)^{EC}	(Turkey) Türk Telekom (5th)	
(Germany) Telekom Baskets Bonn (8th)	(Slovenia) Krka Novo mesto (1st)	(Israel) Barak Netanya (4th)	
Qualifying round
(Russia) Triumph Lyubertsy (6th)	(Belgium) Antwerp Giants (4th)	(Romania) Asesoft Ploieşti (1st)	(Netherlands) ZZ Leiden (3rd)
(Russia) Enisey (9th)	(Belgium) Okapi Aalstar (5th)	(Romania) Steaua Turabo București (7th)	(Sweden) Norrköping Dolphins (1st)
(Russia) Nizhny Novgorod (Note: Nizhny Novgorod finished first in the Russian Super League 1, the second division in Russia.) (1st)	(Belgium) Dexia Mons-Hainaut (6th)	(Cyprus) Keravnos	(Hungary) Szolnoki Olaj (4th)
(Ukraine) Ferro-ZNTU (3rd)	(France) SLUC Nancy (5th)	(Cyprus) ETHA Encomi	(Poland) Trefl Sopot (4th)
(Ukraine) Kyiv (4th)	(France) Paris-Levallois (7th)	(Turkey) Pınar Karşıyaka (6th)	(Czech Republic) Prostějov (2nd)
(Ukraine) Khimik (10th)	(Germany) Artland Dragons (9th)	(Israel) Maccabi Haifa (5th)	(Slovenia) Helios Domžale (3rd)
(Belarus) Minsk-2006 (1st)	(Switzerland) Lugano Tigers (1st)	(Portugal) Benfica (1st)	(Bosnia and Herzegovina) Bosna ASA

== Qualifying round ==
Team 1	Agg.	Team 2	1st leg	2nd leg
Nizhny Novgorod (Russia)	177–174	(Russia) Enisey	92–92	85–82
Szolnoki Olaj (Hungary)	142–108	(Cyprus) Keravnos	75–52	67–56
Paris-Levallois (France)	141–152	(Israel) Maccabi Haifa	75–63	66–89
ZZ Leiden (Netherlands)	128–164	(Turkey) Pınar Karşıyaka	65–87	63–77
ETHA Encomi (Cyprus)	135–130	(Germany) Artland Dragons	69–61	66–69
Bosna Asa (Bosnia and Herzegovina)	132–167	(France) SLUC Nancy	74–91	58–76
Lugano (Switzerland)	166–157	(Russia) Triumph Lyubertsy	85–91	81–66
Norrköping Dolphins (Sweden)	171–163	(Belgium) Okapi Aalstar	85–84	86–79
Khimik (Ukraine)	176–174	(Romania) CSU Asesoft Ploieşti	90–83	86–91
Steaua Turabo (Romania)	156–125	(Ukraine) Kyiv	77–59	79–66
Minsk-2006 (Belarus)	167–176	(Belgium) Antwerp Giants	87–87	80–89
Helios Domžale (Slovenia)	131–154	(Czech Republic) Prostějov	62–70	69–84
Dexia Mons-Hainaut (Belgium)	147–126	(Poland) Trefl Sopot	74–71	73–55
Benfica (Portugal)	182–177	(Ukraine) Ferro-ZNTU	105–105	77–72

== Regular season ==
Key to colors
Top two places in each group advanced to Last 16

The Regular Season began on November 16, 2010.

=== Group A ===
	Team	Pld	W	L	PF	PA	Diff	Pts
1.	(Russia) BC Spartak Saint Petersburg	6	5	1	507	441	+66	11
2.	(France) BCM Gravelines Dunkerque	6	3	3	428	452	−24	9
3.	(Hungary) Szolnoki Olaj KK	6	3	3	447	469	−22	9
4.	(Russia) BC Nizhny Novgorod	6	1	5	434	454	−20	7

	(Russia) SPA	(France) GRA	(Hungary) SZO	(Russia) NIZ
(Russia) SPA		85–77	88–70	92–83
(France) GRA	58–98		82–71	72–64
(Hungary) SZO	88–72	70–69		86–82
(Russia) NIZ	65–72	64–70	76–62	

=== Group B ===
	Team	Pld	W	L	PF	PA	Diff	Pts
1.	(Latvia) BK Ventspils	6	4	2	479	419	+60	10
2.	(Israel) Maccabi Haifa	6	3	3	435	475	−40	9
3.	(Germany) Deutsche Bank Skyliners	6	3	3	399	391	+8	9
4.	(Ukraine) BC Khimik	6	2	4	421	449	−28	8

	(Latvia) VEN	(Israel) MHA	(Germany) SKY	(Ukraine) KHI
(Latvia) VEN		99–62	62–64	79–70
(Israel) MHA	80–86		54–53	75–82
(Germany) SKY	72–71	78–83		72–60
(Ukraine) KHI	71–82	77–81	61–60	

=== Group C ===
	Team	Pld	W	L	PF	PA	Diff	Pts
1.	(Bulgaria) PBC Lukoil Academic	6	5	1	484	440	+44	11
2.	(Portugal) S.L. Benfica	6	3	3	442	483	−41	9
3.	(Switzerland) Lugano Tigers	6	2	4	466	452	+1	8
4.	(Estonia) Tartu Ülikool/Rock	6	2	4	442	459	−25	8

	(Bulgaria) LUK	(Portugal) BEN	(Switzerland) LUG	(Estonia) TAR
(Bulgaria) LUK		92–71	90–81	74–64
(Portugal) BEN	86–79		89–84	80–74
(Switzerland) LUG	66–69	74–52		91–88
(Estonia) TAR	72–80	80–64	73–61	

=== Group D ===
	Team	Pld	W	L	PF	PA	Diff	Pts
1.	(Sweden) Norrköping Dolphins	6	4	2	474	453	+21	10
2.	(Israel) Barak Netanya	6	3	3	453	444	+9	9
3.	(Belgium) Belgacom Liège	6	3	3	468	475	−7	9
4.	(Turkey) Türk Telekom Ankara	6	2	4	501	524	−23	8

	(Sweden) NOR	(Israel) NET	(Belgium) LIE	(Turkey) TÜR
(Sweden) NOR		70–64	92–94	101–89
(Israel) NET	71–64		78–67	113–89
(Belgium) LIE	64–70	70–67		79–83
(Turkey) TÜR	71–77	84–60	85–94	

=== Group E ===
	Team	Pld	W	L	PF	PA	Diff	Pts
1.	(Slovenia) Krka Novo mesto	6	5	1	455	422	+33	11
2.	(Czech Republic) BK Prostějov	6	5	1	478	440	+38	11
3.	(Germany) Telekom Baskets Bonn	6	2	4	453	469	−16	8
4.	KK Zagreb Croatia Osiguranje	6	0	6	440	495	−55	6

	(Slovenia) KRK	(Czech Republic) PRO	(Germany) TBB	(Croatia) ZAG
(Slovenia) KRK		78–62	70–65	78–60
(Czech Republic) PRO	89–77		86–63	86–77
(Germany) TBB	71–74	75–81		79–62
(Croatia) ZAG	75–78	70–74	96–100	

=== Group F ===
	Team	Pld	W	L	PF	PA	Diff	Pts
1.	(Russia) Lokomotiv–Kuban Krasnodar	6	4	2	503	458	+45	10
2.	(Belgium) Antwerp Giants	6	3	3	440	450	−10	9
3.	(Romania) Steaua Turabo București	6	3	3	423	456	−33	9
4.	(Russia) BC Dynamo Moscow	6	2	4	429	431	−2	8

	(Russia) LOK	(Belgium) ANT	(Romania) STE	(Russia) DYN
(Russia) LOK		96–69	78–59	90–89
(Belgium) ANT	87–83		78–65	72–53
(Romania) STE	87–78	80–75		72–59
(Russia) DYN	67–78	73–59	88–60	

=== Group G ===
	Team	Pld	W	L	PF	PA	Diff	Pts
1.	(Turkey) Pınar Karşıyaka	6	4	2	488	455	+33	10
2.	(Croatia) KK Zadar	6	3	3	461	444	+17	9
3.	(Cyprus) APOEL Nicosia	6	3	3	437	440	−3	9
4.	(Cyprus) ETHA Encomi	6	2	4	420	467	−47	8

	(Turkey) KAR	(Croatia) ZAD	(Cyprus) APO	(Cyprus) ETHA
(Turkey) KAR		88–81	76–68	85–67
(Croatia) ZAD	82–77		95–73	81–67
(Cyprus) APO	82–80	61–56		86–59
(Cyprus) ETHA	75–82	78–66	74–67	

=== Group H ===
	Team	Pld	W	L	PF	PA	Diff	Pts
1.	(Belgium) Telenet Oostende	6	4	2	431	424	+7	10
2.	(Belgium) Dexia Mons-Hainaut	6	3	3	440	443	−3	9
3.	(France) SLUC Nancy Basket	6	3	3	465	463	+2	9
4.	(France) Entente Orléanaise	6	2	4	439	445	−6	8

	(Belgium) OOS	(Belgium) DEX	(France) NAN	(France) ORL
(Belgium) OOS		75–67	78–76	69–68
(Belgium) DEX	71–68		76–78	68–61
(France) NAN	72–69	79–82		70–66
(France) ORL	70–72	82–76	92–90	

== Last 16 ==
Key to colors
Homecourt advantage for quarterfinals
Advance to quarterfinals

Starts on January 18, 2011

=== Group I ===
	Team	Pld	W	L	PF	PA	Diff	Pts
1.	(Russia) BC Spartak Saint Petersburg	6	5	1	497	435	+62	11
2.	(Bulgaria) PBC Lukoil Academic	6	4	2	486	447	+39	10
3.	(Israel) Maccabi Haifa	6	2	4	453	519	−66	8
4.	(Israel) Barak Netanya	6	1	5	433	468	−35	7

	(Russia) SPA	(Bulgaria) LUK	(Israel) MHA	(Israel) NET
(Russia) SPA		86–80	101–60	73–70
(Bulgaria) LUK	63–71		87–69	
(Israel) MHA	92–86	78–95		74–77
(Israel) NET	70–80		73–80	

=== Group J ===
	Team	Pld	W	L	PF	PA	Diff	Pts
1.	(Slovenia) Krka Novo mesto	6	5	1	455	418	+37	11
2.	(Turkey) Pınar Karşıyaka	6	4	2	525	475	+50	10
3.	(Belgium) Dexia Mons-Hainaut	6	2	4	441	481	−40	8
4.	(Belgium) Antwerp Giants	6	1	5	390	437	−47	7

	(Slovenia) KRK	(Turkey) KAR	(Belgium) DEX	(Belgium) ANT
(Slovenia) KRK		86–81	85–77	62–46
(Turkey) KAR	94–74		94–71	80–86
(Belgium) DEX	75–84	76–87		77–73
(Belgium) ANT	45–64	82–89	58–65	

=== Group K ===
	Team	Pld	W	L	PF	PA	Diff	Pts
1.	(France) BCM Gravelines Dunkerque	6	5	1	463	448	+15	11
2.	(Latvia) BK Ventspils	6	4	2	503	418	+85	10
3.	(Sweden) Norrköping Dolphins	6	2	4	453	505	−52	8
4.	(Portugal) S.L. Benfica	6	1	5	439	487	−48	7

	(France) GRA	(Latvia) VEN	(Sweden) NOR	(Portugal) BEN
(France) GRA		74–70	75–65	91–82
(Latvia) VEN	80–62		104–69	101–65
(Sweden) NOR	87–94	77–75		80–74
(Portugal) BEN	64–67	71–74	83–75	

=== Group L ===
	Team	Pld	W	L	PF	PA	Diff	Pts
1.	(Belgium) Telenet Oostende	6	5	1	464	418	+46	11
2.	(Russia) Lokomotiv–Kuban Krasnodar	6	4	2	465	425	+40	10
3.	(Czech Republic) BK Prostějov	6	2	4	483	495	−12	8
4.	(Croatia) KK Zadar	6	1	5	444	518	−74	7

	(Belgium) OOS	(Russia) LOK	(Czech Republic) PRO	(Croatia) ZAD
(Belgium) OOS		80–71	87–85	76–53
(Russia) LOK	70–62		90–76	87–69
(Czech Republic) PRO	66–74	67–66		99–82
(Croatia) ZAD	73–85	71–81	96–90	

== Quarter Final Round ==
Started on March 22, 2011.

Best of 3 games

Game #	Team #1	Agg.	Team #2	1st leg	2nd leg	3rd leg
1	(Russia) BC Spartak Saint Petersburg	2–0	(Turkey) Pınar Karşıyaka	78–73	89–71	
2	(Slovenia) Krka Novo mesto	2–1	(Bulgaria) PBC Lukoil Academic	72–78	75–61	71–69
3	(France) BCM Gravelines Dunkerque	0–2	(Russia) Lokomotiv–Kuban Krasnodar	91–92 (OT)	68–86	
4	(Belgium) Telenet Oostende	2–1	(Latvia) BK Ventspils	86–74	92–97 (OT)	70–63

== Final four ==
Semifinals; April 29
(Russia) BC Spartak	64
(Russia) Lokomotiv Kuban	74
(Slovenia) Krka Novo Mesto	79
(Belgium) Telenet Oostende	65

Final; May 1
(Russia) Lokomotiv Kuban	77
(Slovenia) Krka Novo Mesto	83
Third place
(Russia) BC Spartak	92
(Belgium) Telenet Oostende	94
