= BC Sumykhimprom =

Basketball club in Sumy, Ukraine

Sumykhimprom basketball club (Ukrainian: баскетбольний клуб "Сумихімпром") is a Ukrainian professional basketball club that is based in Sumy and sponsored by Sumykhimprom. The club competes in the Ukrainian Basketball Super League. The club's home arenas are the Complex of Ukrainian Academy of Banking and the Basketball Center "Olymp". The team competed in the EuroChallenge 2008-09.

== Roster ==
- (Lithuania) Osvaldas Macernis
- (Lithuania) Jonas Elvikis
- (Ukraine) Serhiy Kuzmenko
- (Ukraine) Yevheniy Pidirvany
- (Canada) Pierre-Marie Altidor-Cespedes
- (Ukraine) Ivan Kaliaiev
- (Ukraine) Oleksandr Lemeshevsky
- (Ukraine) Dmytro Tymchenko
- (Ukraine) Mykola Kotenko
- (Ukraine) Oleh Hushchenko
