= 2005–06 FIBA EuroCup =

FIBA EuroCup
- Season: 2005–06
- Teams: 32

Finals
- Champions: (Spain) Joventut Badalona (1st title)
- Runners-up: (Russia) Khimki
- Third place: (Ukraine) Kyiv
- Fourth place: (Russia) Dynamo Saint Petersburg
- Final Four MVP: (Spain) Rudy Fernández

Statistical leaders
Points	(United States) Khalid El-Amin	19.8
Rebounds	(Panama) Jaime Lloreda	11.5
Assists	(United States) Maurice Whitfield	5.8

The 2005–06 FIBA EuroCup was the 3rd season of the FIBA EuroCup, the third-strongest pan-European club basketball competition. It was the first season of the competition under the new name EuroCup which is now used for the formerly known ULEB Cup. A total number of 32 teams from 20 countries participated in competition. The season finished with the EuroCup Final Four, which was held in Kyiv, Ukraine. Joventut Badalona won the cup after defeating BC Khimki 88–63 in the final.

== Format ==
A number of 32 teams were split into 8 groups of four teams each. The top two teams in each group advanced to the next stage, where they were split into new four groups of four. The top two teams in each group in the second group stage advanced to the Quarter-Final, which was played in a Best-of-three playoff system. The winner of each series advanced to the 2006 EuroCup Final Four, which was held in Kyiv.

== Team allocation ==
The number of the teams remained at 32 of which 7 were domestic champions (including Croatia) and 4 runners-up, including France and Israel.

Country	Teams	Teams			
Russia	4	BC Khimki (4th)	Dynamo St. Petersburg (5th)	Lokomotiv Rostov (6th)	Dynamo Moscow Region (7th)
France	3	SLUC Nancy (2nd)	Cholet (9th)	BCM Gravelines (10th)	
Israel	3	Hapoel Tel Aviv (2nd)	Hapoel Galil Elyon (3rd)	Ironi Strauss Iscar Nahariya (6th)	
Belgium	2	Dexia Union Mons-Hainaut (3rd)	Leuven (6th)		
Spain	2	DKV Joventut Badalona (7th)	CB Gran Canaria (8th)		
Germany	2	RheinEnergie Köln (5th)	Telekom Baskets Bonn (9th)		
Greece	2	Maroussi Honda (4th)	PAOK Thessaloniki (5th)		
Ukraine	2	Kyiv (1st)	Azovmash Mariupol (2nd)		
Austria	1	Allianz Swans Gmunden (1st)			
Croatia	1	KK Zadar (1st)			
Cyprus	1	Proteas EKA AEL Limassol (1st)			
Czech Republic	1	ČEZ Nymburk (1st)			
Estonia	1	BC Kalev/Cramo(1st)			
Italy	1	Vertical Vision Cantu (6th)			
Latvia	1	Barons Riga (2nd)			
Lithuania	1	BC Šiauliai (3rd)			
Netherlands	1	MPC Capitals (5th)			
Poland	1	WKS Slask Wroclaw (5th)			
Romania	1	CSU Asesoft Ploiesti (1st)			
Turkey	1	Fenerbahçe (4th)			

== Regular season ==
=== Group A ===
Pos	Team	Pld	W	L	PF	PA	PD	Qualification
1	(Russia) Dynamo Saint Petersburg	6	6	0	466	392	+74	Advance to top 16
2	(Ukraine) Azovmash Mariupol	6	3	3	480	450	+30	Advance to top 16
3	(France) Cholet	6	2	4	411	469	−58	
4	(Romania) CSU Asesoft Ploiesti	6	1	5	399	445	−46	

Source: FIBA Europe

=== Group B ===
Pos	Team	Pld	W	L	PF	PA	PD	Qualification
1	(Germany) RheinEnergie Köln	6	4	2	439	402	+37	Advance to top 16
2	(Croatia) Zadar	6	3	3	430	428	+2	Advance to top 16
3	(Spain) Gran Canaria	6	3	3	460	449	+11	
4	(Belgium) Leuven	6	2	4	427	477	−50	

Source: FIBA Europe

==== Group C ====
Pos	Team	Pld	W	L	PF	PA	PD	Qualification
1	(Belgium) Dexia Mons-Hainaut	6	4	2	512	502	+10	Advance to top 16
2	(Italy) Vertical Vision Cantù	6	3	3	480	452	+28	Advance to top 16
3	(Lithuania) Šiauliai	6	3	3	470	511	−41	
4	(France) SLUC Nancy	6	2	4	512	509	+3	

Source: FIBA Europe

=== Group D ===
Pos	Team	Pld	W	L	PF	PA	PD	Qualification
1	(Russia) Khimki	6	5	1	548	491	+57	Advance to top 16
2	(Czech Republic) ČEZ Nymburk	6	4	2	504	501	+3	Advance to top 16
3	(Israel) Ironi Strauss Iscar Nahariya	6	3	3	491	482	+9	
4	(Austria) Allianz Swans Gmunden	6	0	6	451	520	−69	

Source: FIBA Europe

=== Group E ===
Pos	Team	Pld	W	L	PF	PA	PD	Qualification
1	(Turkey) Fenerbahçe	6	5	1	528	478	+50	Advance to top 16
2	(Cyprus) Proteas EKA AEL	6	5	1	460	422	+38	Advance to top 16
3	(Estonia) Kalev/Cramo	6	1	5	450	460	−10	
4	(Greece) PAOK	6	1	5	466	544	−78	

Source: FIBA Europe

=== Group F ===
Pos	Team	Pld	W	L	PF	PA	PD	Qualification
1	(Greece) Maroussi Honda	6	4	2	439	397	+42	Advance to top 16
2	(Poland) Śląsk Wrocław	6	4	2	440	443	−3	Advance to top 16
3	(Netherlands) MPC Capitals	6	2	4	408	429	−21	
4	(Israel) Hapoel Tel Aviv	6	2	4	408	426	−18	

Source: FIBA Europe

=== Group G ===
Pos	Team	Pld	W	L	PF	PA	PD	Qualification
1	(Russia) Lokomotiv Rostov	6	5	1	470	443	+27	Advance to top 16
2	(Ukraine) Kyiv	6	5	1	476	409	+67	Advance to top 16
3	(Latvia) Barons/LU	6	1	5	455	489	−34	
4	(Germany) Telekom Baskets Bonn	6	1	5	405	464	−59	

Source: FIBA Europe

=== Group H ===
Pos	Team	Pld	W	L	PF	PA	PD	Qualification
1	(Spain) DKV Joventut	6	5	1	521	474	+47	Advance to top 16
2	(Russia) Dynamo Moscow Region	6	4	2	561	508	+53	Advance to top 16
3	(Israel) Hapoel Galil Elyon	6	2	4	529	556	−27	
4	(France) BCM Gravelines	6	1	5	436	509	−73	

Source: FIBA Europe

== Second stage ==
=== Group I ===
	Team	Pld	W	L	PF	PA	Diff
1.	(Ukraine) BC Kyiv	6	4	2	490	454	+36
2.	(Russia) Dynamo Saint Petersburg	6	3	3	439	438	+1
3.	(Turkey) Fenerbahçe	6	3	3	474	483	-9
4.	(Czech Republic) CEZ Nymburk	6	2	4	477	505	-28

=== Group J ===
	Team	Pld	W	L	PF	PA	Diff
1.	(Greece) Maroussi Honda	6	5	1	393	387	+6
2.	(Germany) RheinEnergie Köln	6	4	2	458	426	+32
3.	(Italy) Vertical Vision Cantu	6	2	4	457	475	-18
4.	(Russia) Dynamo Moscow Region	6	1	5	447	467	-20

=== Group K ===
	Team	Pld	W	L	PF	PA	Diff
1.	(Russia) Lokomotiv Rostov	6	4	2	462	431	+31
2.	(Belgium) Dexia Union Mons-Hainaut	6	4	2	483	456	+27
3.	(Croatia) Zadar	6	2	4	487	464	+23
4.	(Poland) Slask Wroclaw	6	2	4	411	492	-81

=== Group L ===
	Team	Pld	W	L	PF	PA	Diff
1.	(Russia) Khimki	6	4	2	487	447	+40
2.	(Spain) DKV Joventut	6	4	2	527	483	+44
3.	(Ukraine) Azovmash	6	4	2	452	443	+9
4.	(Cyprus) Proteas EKA AEL	6	0	6	486	579	-93

== Quarterfinals ==
Team #1	Agg.	Team #2	1st leg	2nd leg	3rd leg
BC Kyiv (Ukraine)	2 – 1	(Germany) RheinEnergie Köln	87 – 85	62 – 69	71 – 64
Lokomotiv Rostov (Russia)	0 – 2	(Spain) DKV Joventut	54 – 88	57 – 86	
BC Khimki (Russia)	2 – 1	(Belgium) Dexia Union Mons-Hainaut	91 – 75	73 – 79	94 – 78
Maroussi Honda (Greece)	0 – 2	(Russia) Dynamo Saint Petersburg	53 – 64	59 – 71	

=== Final Four ===
==== Bracket ====
Semi-finals
April 7, Kyiv, Kyiv Palace of Sports
(Russia) Khimki	63
(Russia) Dynamo St. Petersburg	61
April 7, Kyiv, Kyiv Palace of Sports
(Ukraine) Kyiv	78
(Spain) DKV Joventut	88

Finals
April 9, Kyiv, Kyiv Palace of Sports
(Russia) BC Khimki	63
(Spain) DKV Joventut	88
Third Place
April 9, Kyiv, Kyiv Palace of Sports
(Russia) Dynamo St. Petersburg	81
(Ukraine) Kyiv	83

== See also ==
- 2005-06 Euroleague
- 2005-06 ULEB Cup
- 2005–06 FIBA EuroCup Challenge
