= FIBA EuroChallenge =

International club basketball competition

EuroChallenge
- Primary logo (2013–2015)
- Formerly: FIBA Europe League (2003–2005); FIBA EuroCup (2005–2008)
- Sport: Basketball
- Founded: 2003
- Folded: 2015
- Replaced by: FIBA Europe Cup
- Motto: We Are Basketball
- No. of teams: 32
- Country: FIBA Europe member associations
- Continent: FIBA Europe (Europe)
- Last champions: (France) Nanterre (1st title)
- Most titles: 12 teams (1 title each)
- Level on pyramid: 3 (2004–15)
- Promotion to: EuroCup (finalists)
- Website: EuroChallenge

FIBA EuroChallenge (called the FIBA Europe League in 2003–05, and FIBA EuroCup in 2005–08) was the 3rd-tier continental club basketball competition in Europe, from 2003 to 2015. It was organized and run by FIBA Europe. It is not to be confused with the FIBA EuroCup Challenge – the defunct 4th-tier competition, which was also organized and run by FIBA Europe, played between 2002–03 and 2006–07. In 2015, FIBA dissolved the EuroChallenge, in order to start the Basketball Champions League (BCL) and FIBA Europe Cup (FEC), in order to extend opportunities outside the competitions organized by the Euroleague Basketball.

== History ==
The competition was created in 2003, following the defections of most of the top European basketball teams from the former FIBA SuproLeague, which heralded the formation of the new version of the Turkish Airlines EuroLeague, under the umbrella of Euroleague Basketball. FIBA was aiming to create a competition similar to the former Suproleague to rival the Euroleague. From the 2004–05 season and after FIBA sanctioned the Euroleague and the ULEB Cup, the EuroChallenge was considered to be the 3rd strongest international professional basketball competition for men's clubs in Europe, after both the Turkish Airlines EuroLeague and the EuroCup (both of which fall under the supervision of Euroleague Basketball). Though, during the first two seasons of the competition's coexistence with the EuroCup, the EuroChallenge (under the name FIBA Europe League) was favored by Italian, Russian and Greek teams, making both competitions quite comparable in strength.

Since the 2007-08 and following am agreement between ULEB and FIBA the two EuroChallenge finalists were promoted to the next season's 2nd tier level, the EuroCup competition.

In 2015, FIBA Europe dissolved the EuroChallenge, to start a new self-anointed second-tier competition, called the FIBA Europe Cup, in an attempt to compete with the EuroCup.

=== Criteria and rules ===
- Each country could have no more than 4 teams in the FEL.
- Clubs could maintain all TV, marketing and merchandising rights, with the exception of the rights related to the Final Four.
- The main criteria for the participation of Cclubs to the FEL would include the ranking of the respective National Federations, and their participation and results in past FIBA competitions
- Venues should hold a minimum capacity of 2,000 spectators
- National Federations could propose their candidates for wild cards

=== Name history ===
- FIBA Europe League (2003–2005)
- FIBA EuroCup (2005–2008)
- FIBA EuroChallenge (2008-2015)

== Final Fours ==
Year	Final			Semifinalists		
Year	Champion	Score	Second place	Third place	Score	Fourth place
2003–04; Details	(Russia); UNICS	87–63	(Greece); Maroussi TIM	(Israel); Hapoel Tel Aviv	112–104	(Russia); Ural Great Perm
2004–05; Details	(Russia); Dynamo Saint Petersburg	85–74	(Ukraine); Kyiv	(Russia); Khimki	86–79	(Turkey); Fenerbahçe
2005–06; Details	(Spain); DKV Joventut	88–63	(Russia); Khimki	(Ukraine); Kyiv	83–81	(Russia); Dynamo Saint Petersburg
2006–07; Details	(Spain); Akasvayu Girona	79–72	(Ukraine); Azovmash	(Italy); VidiVici Bologna	82–60	(Spain); MMT Estudiantes
2007–08; Details	(Latvia); Barons LMT	63–62	(Belgium); Dexia Mons-Hainaut	(Cyprus); Proteas EKA AEL	79–70	(Estonia); Tartu Ülikool Rock
2008–09; Details	(Italy); Virtus BolognaFiere	77–75	(France); Cholet	(Russia); Triumph Lyubertsy	94–82	(Cyprus); Proteas EKA AEL
2009–10; Details	(Germany); Göttingen	83–75	(Russia); Krasnye Krylia	(France); Chorale Roanne	86–80	(Italy); Scavolini Spar Pesaro
2010–11; Details	(Slovenia); Krka	83–77	(Russia); Lokomotiv Kuban	(Belgium); Telenet Oostende	94–92	(Russia); Spartak Saint Petersburg
2011–12; Details	(Turkey); Beşiktaş Milangaz	91–86	(France); Élan Chalon	(Russia); Triumph Lyubertsy	94–87	(Hungary); Szolnoki Olaj
2012–13; Details	(Russia); Krasnye Krylia	77–76	(Turkey); Pinar Karşıyaka	(Germany); EWE Baskets	84–76	(France); Gravelines
2013–14; Details	(Italy); Grissin Bon Reggio Emilia	79–65	(Russia); Triumph Lyubertsy	(Turkey); Gaziantep Royal Halı	87–75 (OT)	(Hungary); Szolnoki Olaj
2014–15; Details	(France); JSF Nanterre	64–63	(Turkey); Trabzonspor Medical Park	(Romania); Energia Târgu Jiu	83–80	(Germany); Fraport Skyliners

== Finals/Final Four MVP award winners (2004–2015) ==
Season	MVP
2003–04	(Estonia) Martin Müürsepp
2004–05	(Russia) Kelly McCarty
2005–06	(Spain) Rudy Fernández
2006–07	(Slovenia) Ariel McDonald
2007–08	(Lithuania) Giedrius Gustas
2008–09	(United States) Keith Langford
2009–10	(Montenegro) Taylor Rochestie
2010–11	(Bosnia and Herzegovina) Goran Ikonić
2011–12	(United Kingdom) Pops Mensah-Bonsu
2012–13	(United States) Tre Simmons
2013–14	(Italy) Andrea Cinciarini
2014–15	(United States) Jamal Shuler

== Records and statistics ==
=== Performances by club ===
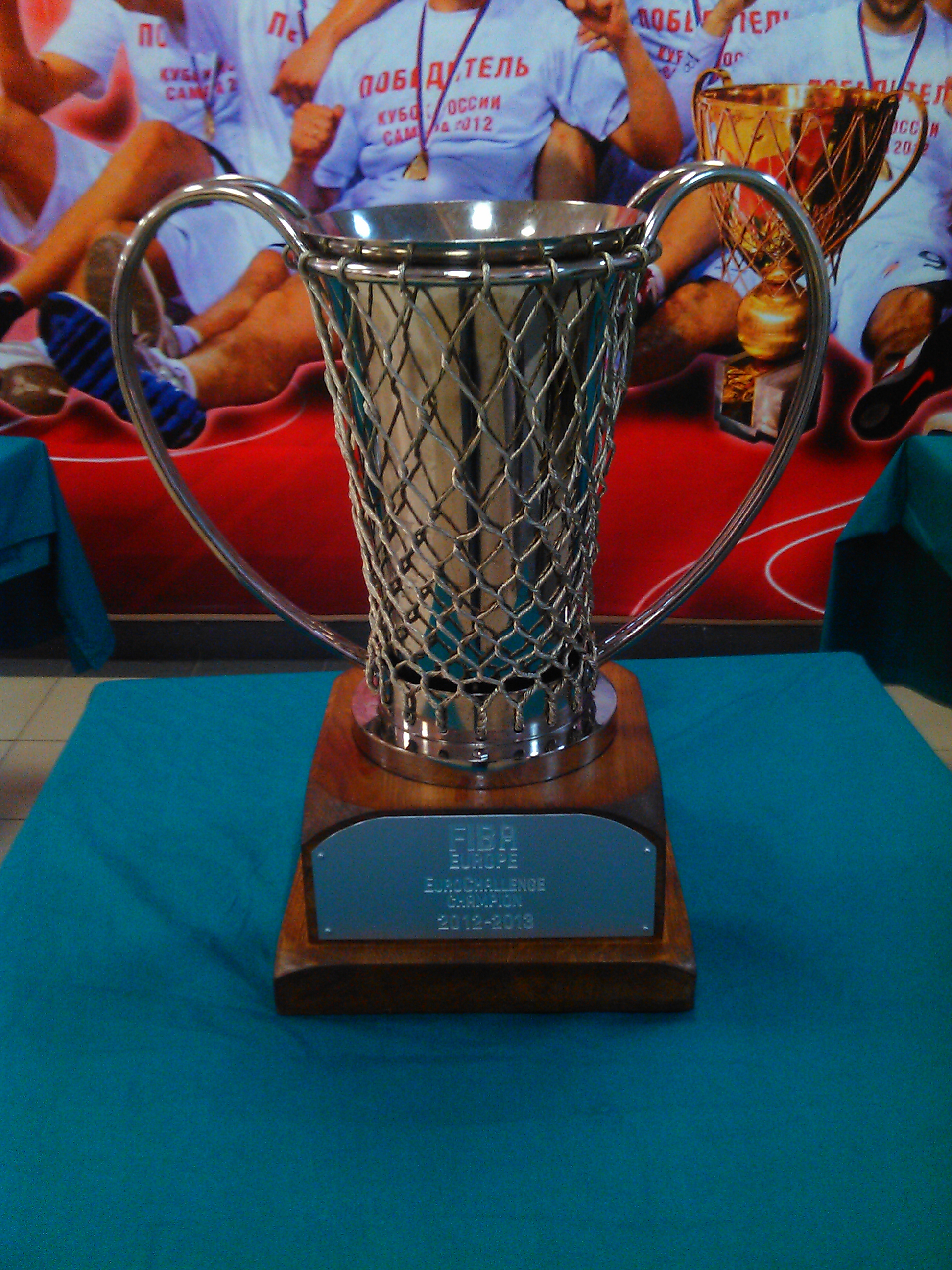
The 2013 EuroChallenge trophy, which was won by Krasnye Krylya.

Performance in the FIBA EuroChallenge by club
Club	Won	Runner-up	Years won	Years runner-up
(Russia) Krasnye Krylia Samara	1	1	2013	2010
(France) Nanterre	1	0	2015	–
(Italy) Pallacanestro Reggiana	1	0	2014	–
(Turkey) Beşiktaş	1	0	2012	–
(Slovenia) Krka Novo mesto	1	0	2011	–
(Germany) BG Göttingen	1	0	2010	–
(Italy) Virtus Bologna	1	0	2009	–
(Latvia) Barons LMT	1	0	2008	–
(Spain) Girona	1	0	2007	–
(Spain) Joventut Badalona	1	0	2006	–
(Russia) Dyanmo Saint Petersburg	1	0	2005	–
(Russia) UNICS Kazan	1	0	2004	–
(Greece) Maroussi	0	1	–	2004
(Ukraine) Kyiv	0	1	–	2005
(Russia) Khimki	0	1	–	2006
(Ukraine) Azovmash	0	1	–	2007
(Belgium) Dexia Mons-Hainaut	0	1	–	2008
(France) Cholet	0	1	–	2009
(Russia) Lokomotiv Kuban	0	1	–	2011
(France) Élan Chalon	0	1	–	2012
(Turkey) Pınar Karşıyaka	0	1	–	2013
(Russia) Triumph Lyubertsy	0	1	–	2014
(Turkey) Trabzonspor	0	1	–	2015
Total	12	12		

=== Performances by country ===
Performance in the FIBA EuroChallenge by country
Country	Won	Runner-up	Winning clubs	Runners-up
Russia	3	4	Krasnye Krylia Samara (1), BC Dynamo Saint Petersburg (1), UNICS Kazan (1)	Krasnye Krylia Samara (1), Lokomotiv Kuban (1), BC Khimki (1), Triumph Lyubertsy (1)
Italy	2	0	Virtus Bologna (1), Pallacanestro Reggiana (1)	–
Spain	2	0	CB Girona (1), Joventut Badalona (1)	–
France	1	2	JSF Nanterre (1)	Élan Chalon (1), Cholet Basket (1)
Turkey	1	2	Beşiktaş (1)	Pınar Karşıyaka (1), Trabzonspor (1)
Germany	1	0	BG Göttingen (1)	–
Latvia	1	0	Barons LMT (1)	–
Slovenia	1	0	KK Krka (1)	–
Ukraine	0	2	–	BC Kyiv (1), BC Azovmash (1)
Greece	0	1	–	Maroussi B.C. (1)
Belgium	0	1	–	Dexia Mons-Hainaut (1)
Total	12	12		

== See also ==
- FIBA Europe Regional Challenge Cup
- FIBA Europe Conference North
- FIBA Europe Conference South
