= Kelly McCarty =

American basketball player (born 1975)

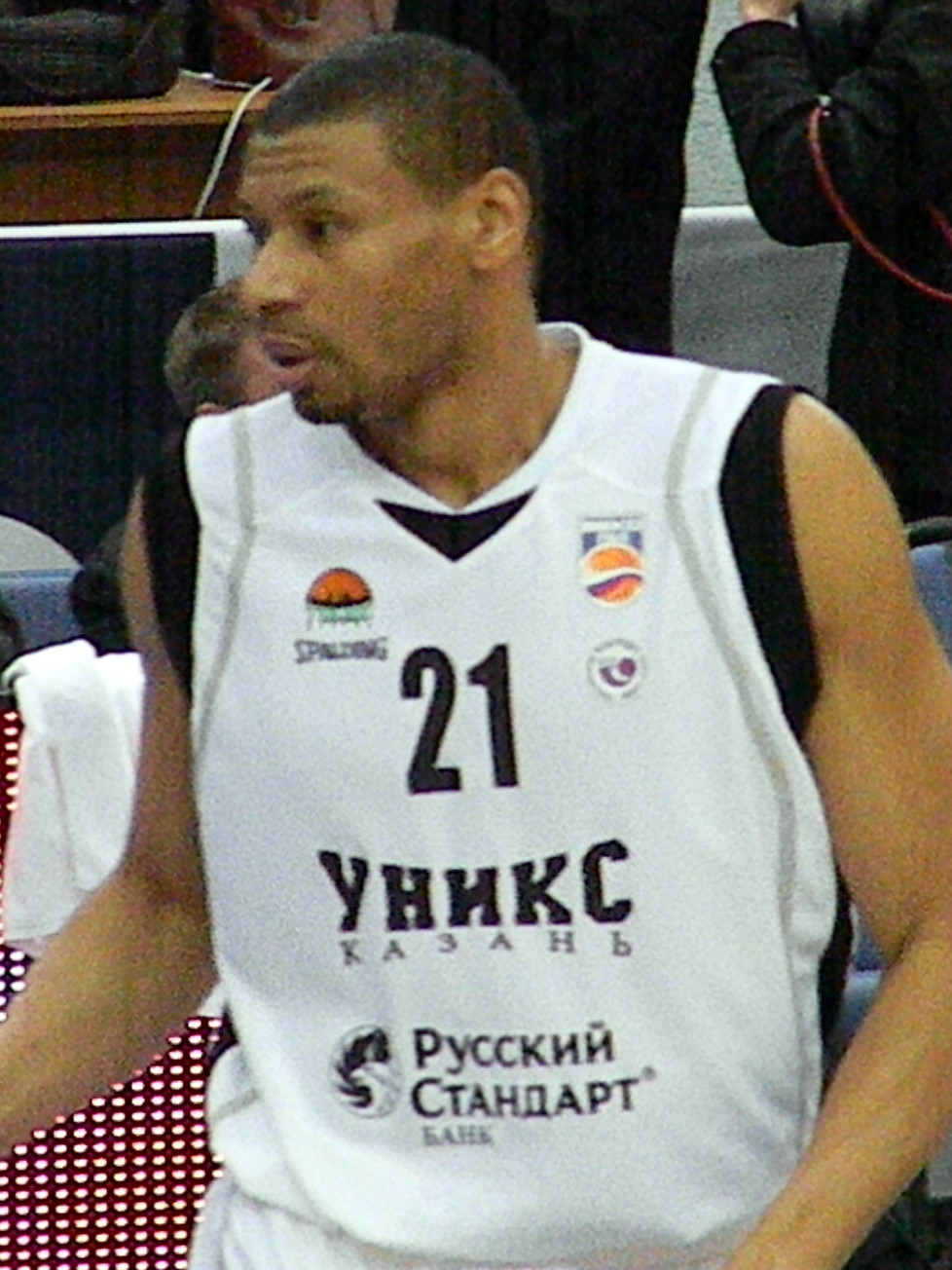
- McCarty in 2011

Minnesota Timberwolves
- Title: Player development coordinator
- League: NBA

Personal information
- Born: August 24, 1975 (age 51) Chicago, Illinois, U.S.
- Listed height: 6 ft 7 in (2.01 m)
- Listed weight: 235 lb (107 kg)

Career information
- High school: Quitman (Quitman, Mississippi)
- College: Southern Miss (1994–1998)
- NBA draft: 1998: undrafted
- Playing career: 1999–2013
- Position: Small forward / shooting guard
- Number: 11, 21

Career history

Playing
- 1999: Denver Nuggets
- 1999–2001: Maccabi Raanana
- 2001: Oklahoma Storm
- 2001–2003: Maccabi Giv'at Shmuel
- 2003–2004: Maccabi Rishon LeZion
- 2004: Hapoel Jerusalem
- 2004–2006: BC Dynamo Saint Petersburg
- 2006–2010: Khimki Moscow Region
- 2010–2013: UNICS Kazan

Coaching
- 2023–2025: Iowa Wolves (assistant)
- 2025–present: Minnesota Timberwolves (assistant)

Career highlights
- 2× EuroCup champion (2004, 2011); EuroCup Finals MVP (2004); 2× All-EuroCup Team (2009, 2011); FIBA EuroChallenge champion (2005); FIBA EuroChallenge Final Four MVP (2005); Russian Cup winner (2008)
- Stats at NBA.com
- Stats at Basketball Reference

Kelly Deshawn McCarty (born August 24, 1975) is a naturalized Russian former professional basketball player who currently serves as the player development coordinator for the Minnesota Timberwolves of the National Basketball Association (NBA). He represented the senior men's Russian national basketball team internationally. At 2.01 m (6 ft 7 in) 235 pounds (107 kg), he played at both the shooting guard and small forward positions. His primary position was small forward.

== High school ==
Born in Chicago, McCarty played high school basketball at Quitman High School, in Quitman, Mississippi.

== College career ==
McCarty played college basketball at the University of Southern Mississippi, with the Southern Miss Golden Eagles, leading the college team in scoring and rebounding during his senior year, in 1997–98.

== Professional career ==
After playing in just 2 regular season games for the Denver Nuggets of the NBA in 1999, McCarty went on to play in Israel, spending 5 seasons there - at first with Maccabi Raanana. He then signed with the Israeli Premier League club Hapoel Jerusalem, and with them he won the ULEB Cup (now called EuroCup) in the 2003–04 season, being voted the EuroCup Finals MVP.

The next year, in the 2004–05 season, he moved to the Russian Super League A club Dynamo Saint Petersburg, and without losing a single game in the FIBA Europe League competition, his team won the championship, and he was elected the Final Four MVP of that tournament. He spent the last years of his career playing in Russia.

== National team career ==
McCarty also played for the senior men's Russian national basketball team at EuroBasket 2009.

== Coaching career ==
On November 9, 2023, McCarty joined the Iowa Wolves as an assistant coach. On September 11, 2025, McCarty was promoted to serve as a player development associate for the Minnesota Timberwolves. On September 25, 2026, McCarty was promoted to the role of player development coordinator.

== Club honors ==
- EuroCup:
  - Winner (2): 2003–04, 2010–11
  - Runner-up (1): 2008–09
- FIBA Europe League:
  - Winner (1): 2004–05
- Russian Championship:
  - Runner-up (3): 2007–08, 2008–09, 2009–10
  - Third place (3): 2005–06, 2006–07, 2010–11
- Russian Cup:
  - Winner (1): 2008
- Israeli Premier League
  - Runner-up (1): 1999–2000
- Israeli Cup:
  - Runner-up (1): 2003, 2004
