= BK Děčín =

BK Armex Děčín
- League: NBL
- Founded: 1945
- Arena: ARMEX ENERGY Sportcentrum
- Capacity: 1,200
- Location: Děčín, Czech Republic
- Team colors: Blue and White
- Website: bkdecin.cz
Home	Away

BK Děčín, for sponsorships reasons named BK ARMEX ENERGY Děčín, is a Czech professional basketball club based in the city of Děčín. They play in the Czech National Basketball League – the highest competition in the Czech Republic.

== History ==
In 1974, Děčín played in the Czechoslovak Premier League for the first time. The team immediately relegated back to the second league, after one season. In 1993, Děčín promoted to the first tier NBL once again, but this time it stayed there until now.

In 2015, 2016 and 2019, Děčín reached the finals of the NBL. However, it never won a game as it was swept in all series by dominant Basketball Nymburk.

== Honours ==
- National Basketball League

Runner-up (3): 2014–15, 2015–16, 2018–19
Third place (4): 1997–98, 2008–09, 2010–11, 2011–12

- Czech Republic Basketball Cup

Runner-up (2): 2015, 2016

== Names ==
- Decin Sokol (1945–1960)
- Spartak-Karna Děčín (1960–1990)
- BK Děčín Locomotive (1990–1995)
- BK SCE Děčín (1995–2005)
- BK Děčín (2005–2015)
- BK Děčín Armex (2015–present)

== Roster ==
The original BK Děčín logo

Note: Flags indicate national team eligibility at FIBA-sanctioned events. Players may hold other non-FIBA nationalities not displayed.

BK Děčín roster
Players
Coaches

Pos.	No.	Nat.	Name	Ht.
PG	0	(Nigeria)	Omotayo Ogundiran
PF/C	5	(Czech Republic)	Tomas Pomikalek
G/F	6	(Czech Republic)	Lukas Bobek
SG	7	(Czech Republic)	Tadeas Slowiak
PF	8	(Czech Republic)	Adam Pecháček
F	9	(Czech Republic)	Oliver Zizka
G	10	(Czech Republic)	Josef Gabriel
PG	13	(Czech Republic)	Filip Kroutil
F	14	(Czech Republic)	Petr Machac
PF/C	16	(Czech Republic)	Jan Sterba
F	19	(New Zealand)	Isaac Davidson
PG	44	(Czech Republic)	Lukas Festr

Head coach

- (Czech Republic) Tomas Grepl

Legend

- (C) Team captain
- Injured

- Roster
Updated: 2025-08-08

== Notable players ==
- (New Zealand) Isaac Davidson
- (United States) Levell Sanders

== Head coaches ==
- (Czech Republic) Pavel Budínský (2004–2019)
- (Czech Republic) Tomas Grepl (2019–present)
