= Czech Basketball All-Star Game =

Annual basketball event in the Czech Republic

NBL All-Star Game
- Status: Active
- Frequency: Annually
- Inaugurated: 1995
- Most recent: 2025
- Organizer: NBL

The Czech Basketball All-Star Game (or NBL All-Star Game) is an annual basketball event in Czech Republic, organised by the NBL, the country's top basketball league. It started in 1995.

Former NBA players like Tomáš Satoranský, and George Zidek have featured in the event.

== History ==
The first Czech All-Star Game took place on 27 April 1995, before a crowd of 1,500. It was played according to the NBA for four-quarters of 12 minutes (FIBA competitions were then still played for two-halves of 20 minutes). The venue was the Sparta hall in Prague and the presenter was a television sports commentator Stepan Skorpil. The players of the starting five were voted by basketball fans, while the rest of players were chosen by the coaches of NBL clubs.

The first game was eventful: delayed as the basketball board broke during the warm-up after a Michael Wilson's slam-dunk, and in the 25th minute of the match, after Jiří Trnka's dunk, the replacement board also broke. As aresult the match ended prematurely with the victory of the East team over the West with 61–54.

The skills contest were also played during the All-Star Game: the first winner in the 3-point contest was Josef Jelinek (he beat Michal Ježdík) while the slam-dunk competition was won by Michael Wilson.

The All-Star Game continued until 2020, with the following two editions cancelled dueo to COVID-19. It returned during the 2023–24 season.

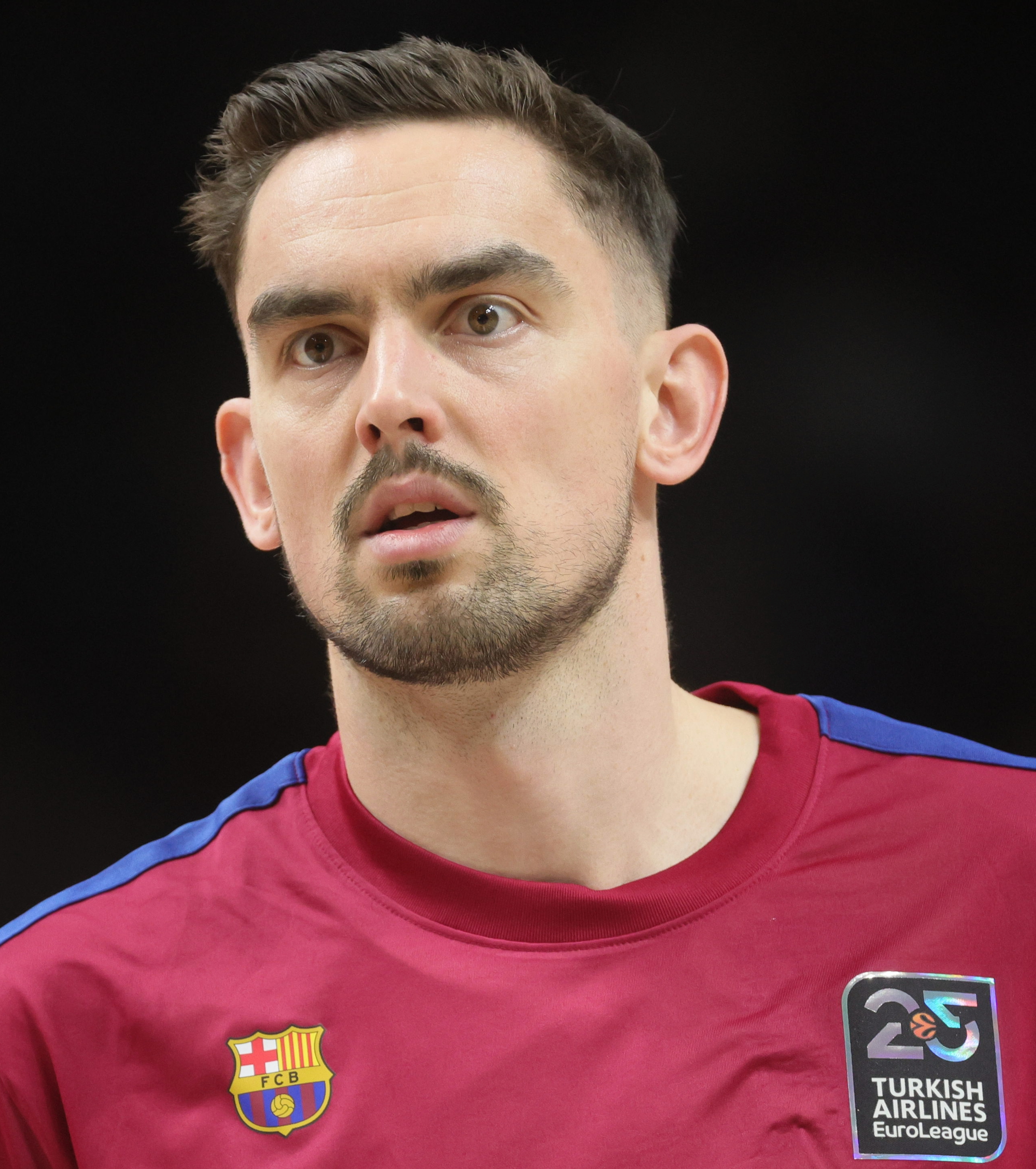
Tomáš Satoranský played in the 2008 and 2009 editions.

== Format ==
From 1995 until 2002 the game was between East and West like in the NBA, after a suggestion by Pavel Majerík, then president of Sparta Prague. Until then teh East had 7 straight wins.

In 2003 it changed to Czech Republic – World stars. However, the East – West All-Star matches were resumed in the 2011 and 2012 editions and in 2013 after an agreement with the Polish Basketball Federation the game was between a NBL and a Polish league selection, played in Wrocław, Poland. A re-match was arranged in Pardubice on 2 March 2014, the following year.

== List of games ==
Edition	Date	Location	Team 1	Team 2	Score	MVP	Three-point shootout	Slam-dunk
I	27 April 1995	Prague	East	West	61:54	(Czech Republic) Jaroslav Kovář, BK NH Ostrava	(Czech Republic) Josef Jelínek, Basket Brno	(United States) Michael Wilson
II	27 April 1996	Prague	East	West	118:108	not awarded	(Czech Republic) Petr Treml, USK Praha	(United States) Tracey Walston, Sparta Praha
III	8 May 1997	Prague	East	West	139:129	not awarded	n/a	n/a
IV	9 May 1998	Strakonice	East	West	122:108	(United States) Daniel Cyrulik, USK Praha	(Czech Republic) Petr Treml (2), USK Praha	(United States) Bryan Crabtree, BK Opava
V	31 March 2000	Nymburk	East	West	118:117	not awarded	(Czech Republic) Tomáš Grepl, Pardubice	(Czech Republic) Daniel Dvořák, Sparta Praha
VI	12 April 2001	Ústí nad Labem	East	West	178:143	(Serbia) Dejan Vukosavljevič, BK Opava	(Czech Republic) Vlastimil Balija	(United States) Antonie Stokes
VII	28 February 2002	Svitavy	East	West	134:128	not awarded	(Serbia) Dejan Vukosavljevič, BK Opava	(United States) Curtis Bobb, BC Nový Jičín
VIII	9 April 2003	Nový Jičín	Czech selection	World Stars	81:81	(United States) Ashante Johnson, Nymburk BC	(Czech Republic) Tomáš Grepl (2), Nymburk BC	(United States) Fred Warrick, Mlékárna Kunín
IX	30 March 2004	Nymburk	Czech selection	World Stars	89:83	(Czech Republic) Jiří Trnka, Nymburk BC	(United States) Curtis Bobb, Mlékárna Kunín	(United States) Ashante Johnson, Nymburk BC
X	22 March 2005	Děčín	World Stars	Czech selection	152:135	(United States) David Palmer, Prostějov	(United States) Adam Hess, Nymburk BC	(United States) Tarvis Williams, BK Děčín
XI	30 April 2006	Prostějov	World Stars	Czech selection	124:116	not awarded	(United States) William Chavis, Mlékárna Kunín	(United States) Craig Callahan, BCM Orli Prostějov
XII	3 April 2007	Děčín	Czech selection	World Stars	123:121	(United States) Darius Washington. Nymburk BC	(United States) Lamar Butler, Prostějov	(Czech Republic) Pavel Englický, Nymburk BC
XIII	2 March 2008	Chomutov	World Stars	Czech selection	109:87	(United States) Monty Mack, Nymburk BC	(Czech Republic) Pavel Miloš, BK Děčín	(Czech Republic) Tomáš Satoranský, USK Praha
XIV	19 April 2009	Prague	World Stars	Czech selection	100–97	not awarded	(Czech Republic) Pavel Miloš, BK Děčín	(Czech Republic) Tomáš Satoranský (2), USK Praha
XV	14 March 2010	Pardubice	Czech selection	World Stars	88:79	(Czech Republic) Aleš Chán, BCM Orli Prostějov	(United States) Myles McKay, USK Praha	(Canada) Corey Muirhead, BC Nový Jičín
XVI	2 April 2011	Pardubice	East	West	92:90	not awarded	(Czech Republic) Tomáš Teplý, Tuři Svitavy	(Czech Republic) Tomáš Pomikálek, BK Děčín
XVII	8 January 2012	Pardubice	West	East	92:89	(Czech Republic) Vojtěch Hruban, USK Paraha	(Czech Republic) Pavel Miloš (3), Tuři Svitavy	(Canada) Corey Muirhead (2), BK Pardubice
XVIII	24 January 2013	Vratislav	PLK Stars	NBL Stars	109:104	(Puerto Rico) Walter Hodge, Tauron	(Poland) Przemyslaw Zamojski	(United States) Michael Deloach, Tuři Svitavy
XIX	2 March 2014	Pardubice	NBL Stars	PLK Stars	109:105		(United States) Tre Simmons, Nymburk BC	(Zaire) Christian Eyenga, Zielona Góra (PLK)
XX	16 March 2015	Prague	Old	Young	126:116	(Canada) Corey Muirhead (2), BK NH Ostrava	(Czech Republic) Kateřina Elhotová, USK Praha	(United States) Brison White, Lions J. Hradec
XXI	26 March 2016	Ústí nad Labem	Old	Young	153:1113	(United States) Nicchaeus Doaks, Tuři Svitavy	(Czech Republic) Kateřina Elhotová, USK Praha	(United States) Brison White (2), Lions J. Hradec
XXII	29 December 2016	Děčín	Young	Old	141:122	(United States) Deshawn Painter, BK NH Ostrava	(Czech Republic) Kateřina Elhotová (3), USK Praha	(United States) Lamb Autrey, BK JIP Pardubice
XXIII	30 December 2017	Ústí nad Labem	Old	Young	133:122	(United States) Donald Robinson, Sluneta Ústí nad Labem	(Czech Republic) Josef Potoček, BK Pardubice	(United States) Kendrick Ray, Nymburk BC
XXIV	30 December 2018	Prague	Young	Old	135:136	(United States) Thomas Dunans, BK Olomoucko	(United States) Donovan Jackson, BK JIP Pardubice	(United States) Thomas Dunans, BK Olomoucko
XXV	19 January 2020	Ústí nad Labem	Young	Old	129:128	(Czech Republic) Šimon Puršl, DEKSTONE Tuři Svitavy	(Czech Republic) Luděk Jurečka, BK Opava	(United States) Zach Hankins, ERA Basketball Nymburk
XXVI	23 March 2024		West	East	97:88	(United States) AJ Walton, BK Děčín	(Czech Republic) Ludek Jurecka, BK Opava	(United States) Adrio Bailey, BK NH Ostrava
XXVII	2 March 2025		North	South	101:80		(Czech Republic) Petr Slechta, Sokol Písek	(Czech Republic) Milan Stranel, Basket Brno

== Score sheets (1995–2025) ==
- 1995: East – West 61:54

Played on 27 April 1995, in the Sparta Prague hall before 1,500 spectators. Quarters (44:31, 89:62, 118:92, 139:129).

EAST: Dušan Medvecký, Jan Svoboda, Petr Czudek, Jaroslav Kovář, Vladan Vahala (starters); Igor Kornišin, Josef Musil, Martin Jelínek, Leoš Krejčí, Jiří Trnka, Martin Rusz, Tomáš Kneifl. Coaches (according to the order of teams in l.liga): Miroslav Pospíšil, Zdenek Hummel

WEST: Pavel Bečka, Michal Ježdík, Václav Hrubý, Tracey Walston, Josef Jelínek (starters); František Babka, Petr Treml, Stanislav Kameník, Aleš Kočvara, Alexander Okhotnikov, Petr Janouch, Michael Wilson. Coaches: Jiří Zídek, František Rón

In FIBA competitions, the game was then refereed by two referees, but according to the NBA model, this All-Star match was refereed by three referees: Karel Bruna, Ivo Dolinek, Ivan Zachara.

- MVPs of the match: Jaroslav Kovář (EAST) and Michal Ježdík (WEST).
- Three-point shootout: 1. Josef Jelínek (Brno) 14, 2. Igor Kornishin (N.Jičín) 11, 3.-4. Václav Hrubý (USK), Petr Janouch (Sparta)
- Free-throw shootout: 1. Michal Ježdík (Sparta), 2. Josef Jelínek (Brno), 3. Igor Kornišin (N.Jičín)
- Slam-dunk contest: 1. Michael Wilson, 2. Jaroslav Kovář, 3. Tracey Walston

Before the match, the 10 best Czech basketball players were ceremoniously announced for the year 1995:

1. Josef Jelínek, 2. Jan Svoboda, 3. Michal Ježdík, 4. Václav Hrubý, 5. Leoš Krejčí, 6. Pavel Bečka, 7. Jaroslav Kovář, 8. Petr Treml, 9. Dušan Medvecký, 10. Stanislav Kameník

- 1996: East – West 118:108

Played on 27 April 1996, at the Sparta Prague hall. 1,200 spectators. Quarters (25:24,56:53, 83:77, 118:108).

EAST: Jaroslav Kovář 22, Jan Svoboda 19, Vladan Vahala 19, Tomáš Kneifl 13, Dušan Medvecký 12, Josef Jelínek 10, Petr Němec 9, Petr Czudek 6, Igor Kornišin 4, Jiří Trnka 4. Coaches: Miroslav Pospíšil (Stavex Brno), Milan Veverka (NH Ostrava)

WEST: Petr Treml 19, Tracey Walston 18, Marián Přibyl 13, Pavel Staněk 12, Aleš Kočvara 11, Vladimír Vyoral 10, František Babka 8, Adenkoule Aleburu 7, Václav Hrubý 7, Lukáš Krátký 2. Coaches: František Rón (USK), Michal Ježdík (Sparta)

Referees were: Karel Bruna, Ivan Zachara, Zdeněk Šantrůček.

- MVPs of the match:
- Three-point shootout: 1. Peter Treml 15 (USK), 2. Dušan Medvecky 11
- Slam-dunk contest: 1. Tracey Walston (Sparta), 2. Jaroslav Kovář, 3. Adenkoule Aleburu

Before the match, the 10 best Czech basketball players were ceremoniously announced for the year 1996:

1. Jan Svoboda, 2. Josef Jelínek, 3. Jaroslav Kovář, 4. Petr Czudek, 5. Petr Treml, 6. Václav Hrubý, 7. Michal Ježdík, 8. Vladan Vahala, 9. Dušan Medvecký, 10. Vladimír Vyoral

- 1997: East – West 139:129

Played on 8 May 1997, at the Sparta Prague hall, 1,100 spectators.

EAST: Petr Czudek 7, Jiří Okáč (DNP), Jan Svoboda 15, Vladan Vahala, Josef Jelínek (DNP) (selected to start); Vladan Vahala 24, Marek Stuchlý 22, Martin Rusz 22, Jaroslav Kovář 16, Pavel Pekárek 14, David Klapetek 10, Vlastimil Havlík 9. Coaches: Jan Kozák (Opava), Zdeněk Hummel (N.Jičín)

WEST: Petr Treml 15, Václav Hrubý 10, Lukáš Krátký 12, Luboš Bartoň 11, Johnny Perkins (DNP) (selected to start); Pavel Stanek 22, Petr Janouch 20, Tomáš Kneifl 18, Milan Doksanský 9, Roman Bašta 6, Marián Přibyl 6, Michal Ježdík (DNP). Coaches: František Rón (USK), Jan Skokan (Děčín)

Before the match, the 10 best Czech basketball players were ceremoniously announced for the year 1997:

1. Petr Czudek, 2. Jiří Okáč, 3. Petr Treml, 4. Jan Svoboda, 5. Václav Hrubý, 6. Jaroslav Kovář, 7. Josef Jelínek, 8. Vladan Vahala, 9. Pavel Staněk, 10. Johnny Perkins

- 1998: East – West 122:108

Played in Strakonice, 9 May 1998, 1.200 spectators.

EAST: Petr Welsch, Josef Jelínek, Jaroslav Kovář, Jiří Okáč, Bojan Lapov (selected to start); Donald Whiteside, Bryan Crabtree, Jan Svoboda, Kamil Nováki, Petr Czudek, Vladan Vahala (DNP). Coach: Jan Skokan.

WEST: Václav Hrubý, Luboš Bartoň, Petr Treml, Roman Bašta, Darius Dimavičius (DNP) (selected to start); Pavel Zajíc, Petr Janouch, Pavel Miloš (DNP), Daniel Cyrulik, Věroslav Sucharda, Milan Doksanský. Coach: Zdeněk Hummel.

- MVP of the match: Daniel Cyrulik
- Top scorers of the match: Josef Jelínek (24) and Jaroslav Kovář (24) – Daniel Cyrulik (29), Luboš Bartoň (24)
- Three-point shootout: 1. Peter Treml (USK Praha), 2. Petr Janouch
- Slam-dunk contest: 1. Bryan Crabtree (BK Opava), 2. Daniel Cyrulik

- 2000: East – West 118:117

Played in Nymburk, 500 spectators (sold out). Quarters: (88:93, 67:63, 30:30, 118:117).

EAST: Jiří Trnka 25, Josef Jelínek 19, Petr Nečas 15, Lynnard Stewart 14, Marek Stuchlý 11, Ladislav Sokolovský 10, Roderick Anderson 8, Pavel Beneš 7, David Klapetek 7, Šimáček 2

WEST: Tomáš Grepl 19, Veroslav Sucharda 16, Petr Janouch 13, Daniel Dvořák 12, Petr Treml 11, Siniša Medenica 11, Miroslav Modr 10, David Douša 9, Václav Hrubý 7, Darko Vuksanič 5, Karel Formánek 3.

- Karel Formánek, Miroslav Modr, Pavel Beneš, David Klapetek and Šimáček replaced Jiří Welsch, Levell Sanders and Daniel Cyrulik who were injured. The game was decided by Roderick Anderson (Opava), with a successful free throw, 5 seconds before the end of the match.

Referees: Karel Bruna, Ivo Dolinek.

- Three-point shootout: 1. Tomas Grepl (Pardubice), 2. Luboš Pohanka
- Slam-dunk contest: 1. Daniel Dvořák (Sparta), 2. Ladislav Sokolovský

- 2001: East – West 178:143

Played in 4 periods of 15 minutes on 15 April 2001, in Ústí nad Labem. Quarters (31–46, 86–78, 127–96, 178:143).

EAST: Jan Pavlik 28, Marek Stuchlý 25, Antoine Stokes 23, Dejen Vukosavljevic 20, Petr Welsch 18, Jiří Okáč 17, Ales Kočvara 14, David Klapetek 13, Petr Nečas 12, Goran Adžič 8. Coaches: František Rón (Opava), Juraj Žuffa (N.Jičín)

WEST: Pavel Kubálek 19, Amir Delalič 19, Darko Vuksanič 16, Pavel Miloš 15, Daniel Dvořák 14, Pavel Frana 13, Daniel Cyrus 12, Petr Janouch 12, Václav Hrubý 9, Jakub Velenský 7, Petr Treml 7, Tomáš Grepl 0. Coaches: Milan Šedivý (USK Praha), Michal Ježdík (Sparta Praha)

- MVP of the match: Dejan Vukosavljevic
- Three-point shootout: 1. Vlastimil Balija (Brno) 19, 2. Vladimir Vyoral (Sparta)16. Semi-finals: 1. Vladimir Vyoral, Sparta 21, 2. Vlastimil Balija, Brno) 20, 3. Dejan Vukosavljevic, Opava 18, 4. Mladen Gambiroza, Nymburk 17.
- Slam-dunk contest: 1. Antonie Stokes 29, 2. Daniel Dvořák 15. Semi-finals: 1. Daniel Dvořák (Sparta) 47, 2. Antonie Stokes (Opava) 41, 3. Lukáš Houser (Usti) 40, 4. Pavel Englický (Sparta) 16.

- 2002: East – West 134:128

Played at the Sports Hall Strelnici, Svitavy on 28 February 2002. Quarters (32:43, 72:67, 101:96, 134:128).

EAST: Bobb Curtis 21, Jiří Okáč 20, Ales Kočvara 16, Jaroslav Kovář 14, Ladislav Sokolovský 14, Jan Svoboda 12, Bojan Malesevich 10, Jan Pavlik 9, Jiří Černošek 7, Popovic 6, Peter Czudek 5

WEST: Roberto Gittens 23, Nemanja Danilovic 20, Pavel Miloš 19, David Douša 14, Josef Jelínek 13, Petr Treml 9, Aleksandar Damjanovic 7, Jakub Velenský 7, Tomáš Grepl 5, Pavel Frana 4, Marián Přibyl 4, Václav Hrubý 3

- Three-point shootout: 1. Dejan Vukosavljevic (18), 2. Tomas Grepl (15). Semi-finals: Dejan Vukosavljevic (20), Tomáš Grepl (17), Petr Treml (14), Curtis Bobb (13), Pavel Miloš (13).
- Slam-dunk contest: Winner was Bobb Curtis (Mlékárna Kunín, Nový Jičín)

- 2003: Czech Republic – World Selection 81:81

Played on 9 April 2003, in Nový Jičín. 1,100 spectators (sold out). Quarters (20:21, 38:49, 59:60, 81:81).

For 2003, the organizers decided to change the format of the traditional all-star match. Instead of the previous EAST and WEST selections, the teams were selected from both the Czech and foreign Mattoni NBL league. Pavel Miloš (Sparta) and Curtis Bobb (Mlékárna Kunín) received the most votes.

Czech selection: Daniel Dvořák 12, Věroslav Sucharda 12, Jiří Černošek 11, Jaroslav Kovář 11, Tomáš Grepl 10, Jaroslav Prášil 8, Marek Mužík 7, Pavel Frana 5, Jakub Velenský 5, Petr Czudek, Jan Pavlík, Zbyněk Pospíšil, Pavel Miloš (DNP), Sokolovský (DNP), Petr Benda (DNP), Klimek (DNP)

WORLD: Rah-shun Roberts 13, Curtis Bobb 11, Vladimir Kuznetsov 9, Dragan Ristanovich 8, Maurice Whitfield 8, Marijo Bošnjak 7, Ashante Johnson 7, Slobodan Kaličanin 6, Derrick Warrick 4, Dušan Bohunicky 3, Pave Kuzmanic 3, Levell Sanders 2

- MVP of the match: Daniel Cyrulik
- Three-point shootout: Round 1: Dušan Bohunicky 10, Tomáš Grepl 20, Michael Garrett 7, Zdeněk Formánek 9, Marijo Bošnjak 13, Daniel Dvořák 5. Final Tomas Grepl 17, Marijo Bošnjak 12.
- Slam-dunk contest final: Fred Warrick 30 (M.Kunín), Daniel Dvořák 24 (Sparta).

- 2004: Czech Republic – World Selection 89:83

Played on 30 March 2004, in Nymburk. Att: 1,500. Quarters (19:23, 44:42, 63:63, 89:83).

Czech selection: Jiří Zídek 19, Jiří Trnka 15, Jan Pavlík 12, Petr Czudek 11, Ladislav Sokolovsky 9, Cernosek 6, Sucharda 5, Stanek 5, Petr Benda 4, Pavel Milos 2, Necas 1, Jelinek 0. Coaches: Michal Ježdík and Zdeněk Hummel

WORLD: Derrick Warrick 16, Ashante Johnson 13, Shoshka 12, Craig Callahan 11, Whitfield 7, Bobb 6, Roberts 6, Gittens 5, Mujagic 3, Gavlak 2, Kuzmanic 2. Coaches: Zbyněk Choleva and Libor Jeřábek (Levell Sanders DNP)

- MVP of the match: Jiří Trnka (Nymburk). Best Player of the World Selection: Fred Warrick (Brno).
- Three-point shootout: 1. Curtis Bobb (M.Kunín) 19 points, 2. Pavel Miloš (Sparta) 17, 3. Jan Pavlík (Brno) 16.
- Slam-dunk contest final: 1. Ashante Johnson (Nymburk) 49 points, 2. Roberto Gittens (Sluneta Ústí nad Labem) 45, 3. Ladislav Sokolovský (Opava) 40.

- 2005: Czech Republic – World Selection 135:152

Played in Děčín, att: 1200 spectators. Quarters (32:43, 55:66, 101:115. 135:152)

Czech selection: Ladislav Sokolovský 20, Marek Stuchlý 18, Maurice Whitfield 16, Milan, Soukup 15, Pavel Bosák 11, Pavel Miloš 10, Daniel Dvořák 10, Petr Nečas 10, Pavel Beneš 9, Zbyněk Pospíšil 8, David Machač 4, Petr Benda 2

WORLD: David Palmer 31, Craig Callahan 26, Tarvis Williams 24, Antonio Bičvič 20, Juraj Gavlák 12, Adam Hess 12, Levell Sanders 11, Ondrej Šoška 8, Ashante Johnson 2, Petar Maleš 2, Brian Howard 2, Goran Adžič 2

- Pavel Beneš replaced Petr Czudek (injured), Daniel Dvořák replaced David Douša (injured), and David Palmer replaced Derrick Warrick (injured)
- MVP of the match: David Palmer
- Three-point shootout final: 1. Adam Hess (Nymburk) 15, 2. Pavel Slezák (Brno) 9
- Slam-dunk contest final: 1. Tarvis Williams (Děčín), 2. Craig Callahan (Prostějov), 3. Daniel Dvořák (Sparta).

- 2006: Czech Republic – World Selection 116:124

Played on 30 April 2006, in Sportcentrum Hall, Prostějov. Quarters (32:29, 52:62, 85:92, 116:124).

Czech selection: Ladislav Sokolovský 27, Rostislav Pelikán 19, Petr Benda 16, Marek Stuchlý 14, Petr Czudek 11, David Hájek 10, Prasil 9, Kremen 4, Vrubl 3, Whitfield 2, Votroubek 2, Necas 2 (Coaches: Michal Pekárek, Zdeněk Hummel)

WORLD: Radoslav Rančík 26, Craig Callahan 17, Cameron Crisp, Fred Alonso Warrick, Goran Savanovič, Ondrej Šoška 12, Ferreira 12, Hess 10, Ames 7, Mujagic 6, Korytek 4, Chavis 4 (Coaches: Michal Ježdík and Pavel Budínský)

Referee: Ilona Kittlerová, Ivo Dolínek, Ivan Zachara.

- Three-point shootout winner: 1. William Chavis (Kunín Dairy)
- Slam-dunk contest winner: 1. Craig Callahan (Prostějov)

- 2007: Czech Republic – World Selection 123:121

Played on 3 April 2007, in Děčín, att: 1030. Quarters (41:28, 68:65, 92:92, 123:121).

Czech selection: Pavel Slezák 21, Marek Stuchlý 16, Pavel Prach 16, Pavel Beneš 12, Lukáš Kraus 11, Stanislav Votroubek 10, Ladislav Sokolovský 9, Pavel Houška 8, Jiří Trnka 7, Jakub Houška 6, Pavel Miloš 5, Petr Bohačík 2, Petr Benda (DNP). Coach: Pavel Budínský

WORLD: Tarvis Williams 17, Darius Washington 16, Radoslav Rančík 15, Lamar Butler 14, Justin Bryan 14, Chad Timberlake 10, Peter Mulligan 10, Edward Ames 7, Ivan Perinčič 5, Cameron Crisp 4, Levell Sanders, Admir Alič 3, Denis Mujagič 3. Coach: Muli Katzurin.

Referee: Zdeněk Šedivý, Tomáš Vyklický, Václav Lukeš.

- Due to injury, the winner of the fans vote, Petr Benda (Brno), did not play. The Czech team won with Sokolovský's three two seconds before the end.
- MVP of the match: Darius Washington
- Three-point shootout final: 1. Lamar Butler (Prostějov) 15 points, 2. Stanislav Votroubek (Nymburk) 8. Elimination in the semi-finals: Edward Ames (Pardubice), Adnir Alič (USK Praha), Pavel Prach (A Plus Brno), Pavel Miloš (Děčín).
- Slam-dunk contest final: 1. Pavel Englicky, 2. Radoslav Rančík (oba Nymburk). Elimination in the semi-finals: Darius Washington (Nymburk), Chad Timberlake (Mékárna Kunín), Pavel Houška (Děčín), Lukáš Kraus (Liberec).

- 2008: Czech Republic – World Selection 87:109

Played on 2 March 2008, at the Chomutov city sports hall. Quarters (24:28, 46:56, 70:81, 87:109).

Schilb's accurate half-field shot in the last second of the match decided the game.

Czech selection: Jan Stehlík 27, Tomáš Satoranský 14, Stephen Reinberger 9

WORLD: Blake Schilb 22, Tarvis Williams 16, Roderick Platt 15, Jason McCoy 14

- MVP of the match: Monty Mack
- Three-point shootout final: 1. Pavel Miloš (Děčín) 16 points, 2. Monty Mack (Nymburk) 15 points
- Slam-dunk contest final: 1. Tomáš Satoranský (only sixteen-year-old) (USK Praha) 47 points, 2. Jason McCoy (Cologne) 37 points, 3. Tarvis Williams (Pardubice) 36 points, 4. Jan Stehlík (Ostrava) 21 points

- 2009: Czech Republic - WORLD 97:100

Played on 19 April 2009 at Folimance, in Prague, att: 1300 (sold out).

Czech selection: Pavel Houška 18, Michael Vocetka 13, Pavel Pumprla 12, Lukáš Kotas and Zbyněk Pospíšil 10, Petr Benda, David Šteffel

WORLD: Tarvis Williams 18, Lavell Payne 16, Blake Schilb 13, Kenneth Walker 12, Lawrence Hamm 10, Hurl Beechum (Coaches: Muli Katzurin and Ken Scalabroni).

- MVP: not awarded
- Three-point shooting competition: 1. Pavel Miloš (Děčín) 19 (semifinals) and 17 (final), 2. Hurl Beechum (Prostějov) 19 and 12, 3. Michal Vocetka (USK) 15 and 12, 4. Jan Tomanec (Poděbrady) 13, 5. Justin Gray (Nymburk) 12, 6. Maurice Hampton (Liberec) 10.
- Slam-dunk contest: 1. Tomas Satoransky (USK) 50 and 50, 2. Corey Muirhead (New Jičín) 50 and 49, 3. Pavel Pumprla (Opava) 50 and 40, 4. Jon Rogers (Cologne) 45, 5. Blake Schilb (Nymburk) 43, 6. Lavell Payne (Pardubice) 41.

- 2010: Czech Republic - WORLD 88:79

Played on 14 March 2010, in Pardubice, att: 6,360, record attendance. Half-time (43:35).

Czech selection: Ales Khan 19, Pavel Pumprla 16, Pavel Houška 14, Ladislav Sokolovsky 13, Jaroslav Prášil - Pavel Slezak, Petr Benda, Tomas Vyoral, David Machac (coaches: Pavel Budínský, Zbyněk Choleva)

WORLD: Myles McKay 16, Kenneth Walker 13 Marcus Arnold 13, Peter Mulligan 10 - Arthur Lee, Corey Muirhead, Maurice Hampton, Robert Sarovic, Kevin Thomas, Andrius Slezas, Tremaine Ford (coaches: Muli Katzurin, Kenneth Scalabroni)

- MVP: Ales Khan (Prostějov).
- Three-point shooting competition: 1. Myles McKay (USK) 22 points, 2. Pavel Miloš (Pardubice) 18.
- Slam-dunk contest final: 1. Corey Muirhead (New Jičín) 100, 2. Ladislav Horák (Poděbrady) 97, 3. Tomáš Pomikálek (Děčín) 91.

- 2011: EAST - WEST 92:90

Played on 2 April 2011, in Pardubice, (59:48), att: 4,850 spectators. Half-time (59:48).

Starting rosters were selected based on fan voting at www.nbl.cz, while All-Star coaches Pavel Buda (West) and Zbynek Choleva (East) filled out the remainder of the rosters.

EAST: Eugene Lawrence 17, Corey Muirhead 13, Robert Sarovic, Kyle Landry, Lukas Palyza (starters) - Andrew Spagrud 16, Dwight Burke 10, Vaidotas Pečiukas 10, Michal Carnecky, Benas Veikalas. Alternates: Jakub Sirina, Jakub Blazek (coach: Pavel Budínský)

WEST: Aleš Khan 20, Maurice Hampton, Marcus Arnold 17, Petr Bohačík 12, Pavel Houška 12, Levell Sanders, Pavel Pumprla 11 (starters) - Afik Nissim , Terry Smith, Chester Simmons, Petr Bohacik. Alternates: Vojtech Hruban, Admir Alic (coach: Zbyněk Choleva)

- MVP: not awarded
- Three-point shooting competition: 1. Tomas Teplý (Svitavy) 25 points, 2. Luděk Jurečka (Novy Jičín) 20; in the semi-finals, the following were eliminated: Levell Sanders, Michal Křemen, Benas Veikalas, Jiří Černošek.
- Slam-dunk contest final: 1. Tomáš Pomikálek (Děčín) 92, 2. Corey Muirhead (New Jičín) 87, 3. Andrew Spagrud (Ostrava) 44; were eliminated in the semi-finals: Ladislav Horák, Ladislav Pecka, Jakub Němeček.
- Skills Challenge (slalom): 1. Derek Wright (Pardubice) 27 seconds, 2. Eugene Lawrence (Prostějov) 34; were eliminated in the semi-finals: Daniel Gajdošík, Afik Nissim, Jakub Šiřina, Michal Šotnar.

- 2012: EAST - WEST 89 - 92

Played on 2 January 2012, in Pardubice, att: 3,130 spectators. HT (49:45).

The WEST basketball team defeated the EAST team for the first time in the history of Czech All-Star matches.

EAST: Travis Peterson 21, Keaton Grant 16, Jamar Smith 15, Marcus Arnold 10, Boris Meno 8, Corey Muirhead, Michael Bernard, Maurice Hampton, Radim Klecka, Riley Luettgerodt (Coaches: Jan Slowiak and Zbynek Choleva)

WEST: Peter Sedmák 15, Vojtěch Hruban 14, Pavel Houška 14, Tomáš Pomikálek 12, Robert Lowery 11, Pavel Pumprla 10, Eugene Lawrence, Petr Benda, Rashaan Ames, Stanislav Zuzak, Peter Sedmak (Coaches: Pavel Budinsky and Ronen Ginzburg)

- MVP: Vojtěch Hruban (USK Praha)
- Three-point shooting competition: 1. Pavel Miloš (Svitavy) 21, 2. Stanislav Votroubek (USK) 19; were eliminated in the semi-finals: Tomáš Teply (Svitavy), Lukáš Palyza (Nymburk), Luděk Jurečka (Ostrava), Thaddus McFadden (Ústí).
- Slam-dunk contest final: 1. Corey Muirhead (Pardubice), 2. Smith (Prostějov); eliminated in the semi-finals: Jeremiah Wilson, Pavel Pumprla (oba Nymburk), Ladislav Horák (Svitavy), Robert Lowery (Chomutov).
- Skills Challenge (slalom): 1. Tomas Vyoral (Nymburk) 47 seconds, 2. Tomáš Macela (Svitavy) 73; eliminated in the semi-finals: Lukáš Feštr (USK), John Boyer (Děčín), Derek Wright (Ostrava), Keaton Grant (Levice).

- 2013: Polish League Selection – Mattoni NBL Selection 109:104

Played on 24 February 2013, in Wrocław, Poland. Quarters (32:26, 58:55, 86:84)

Tauron Basket Liga – Mattoni NBL 109:104 (32:26, 58:55, 86:84), Wrocław, 24.2.2013.

Tauron Basket League selection: Walter Hodge 22, Filip Dylewitz 14, Ben McCauley 13, Przemyslaw Zamojski 12, Yemi Gadri-Nicholson 8, Oliver Stevic 7, Meteusz Ponitka 6, Krzysztof Szubarga 6, Quinton Hosley, Michal Chilinski 5, Jakub Dloniak 5, Aaron Cel 4, Pawel Kikowski 2 (coach: Miodrag Rajkovic. assistant: Jerzy Chudeusz)

Mattoni NBL Selection: Michael Deloach 27, Evaldas Žabas 18, Jan Tomanec 13, Pawel Mróz 12, Salih Nuhanovic 10, Austin Dufault 7, Vojtěch Hruban, Lukáš Palyza 5, Corey Muirhead 5, Jiří Welsch 2, Jan Pavlík 0, Luboš Stria 0 (coach: Ronen Ginzburg, assistant: Lubomír Růžička)

- MVP: Walter Hodge (Polish League Selection)
- Three-point shooting competition: In the all-Polish final, Przemyslaw Zamojski won (18), Chyliński finished second. None of the 3 Czechs (Lukáš Palyza 17, Pavel Miloš, Luboš Stria) advanced to the final.
- Slam-dunk contest final: winner Michael Deloach (Svitavy), other finalists Austin Default and Przemyslaw Zamojski

- 2014 Mattoni NBL Selection - Polish League Selection 109:105

Played on 2 March 2014, in Pardubice. Quarters (21:24, 47:51, 75:84)

Mattoni NBL Selection: Jaromír Bohačík 22, Corey Muirhead 16, Jakub Šiřina 13, Kwamain Mitchell 11, Petr Benda 10, Radoslav Rančík 8, Petr Bohačík 8, Tre Simmons 6, Vojtěch Hruban 6, Rashid Mahalbasic 4, Jiří Welsch 3, Levell Sanders 2 (coach: Kestutis Kemzura, assistant: Zbyněk Choleva)

Tauron Basket League selection: Vladimir Dragičevich 18, Christian Eyenga 18, Cezary Trybaňski 17, Przemysław Zamojski 8, Devidas Dulkys 8, Damian Kulig 7, JP. Prince 7, Adam Waczyński 6, Łukasz Koszarek 6, Korie Lucious 5, Jakub Dłoniak 3, Roderick Trice 2 (coach: Mihailo Uvalin, assistant: Jerzy Chudeusz)

- MVP:
- Three-point shooting competition: 1. Tre Simmons (Nymburk) 18 points, 2. Adam Waczyňski (Sopoty) 16, 3. Przemyslaw Zamojski (Zielona Góra) 14.
- Slam-dunk contest final: 1. Christian Eyenga (Zielona Góra) 48, 2. Vojtěch Hruban (Nymburk) 46, 3. Deividas Dulkys (Wloclawek) 44.

- 2015: Old Rifles – Young Rifles 126:116

Played on 16 March 2015 at hall Královka, in Prague . Quarters (21:24, 47:51, 75:84)

Old Rifles: Corey Muirhead (Ostrava) 23, Štefan Ličartovský (Kolín) 18, Pavel Slezák (Svitavy) 17, Petr Benda (Nymburk) 12, Levell Sanders (Pardubice) 10, Jakub Houška (Nymburk) 9, Jiří Welsch (Nymburk) 8, Luboš Stria (Svitavy) 6, Cory Abercrombie (Svitavy) 6, Radek Nečas (Pardubice) 4, Ladislav Sokolovský (Opava) 2 - coach Kestutis Kemzura

Young rifles: Donald Lee Robinson 23 (Ústí nL), Lamb Autrey (J.Hradec) 20, Tomáš Pomikálek (Nymburk) 13, Matěj Svoboda (Nymburk) 11, Mitja Nikolic (Ústí nL) 9, Jobi Wall (Pardubice) 8, Jiří Jelínek (Děčín) 7, Ondřej Kohout (Pardubice), Vojtěch Hruban (Nymbuk) 6, Clayton Scott Vette (Ústí nL) 6, Ondřej Šiška (Děčín) 4, Tomáš Vyoral (Děčín) – coach Pavel Budínský

- MVP: Corey Muirhead (Ostrava)
- Three-point shooting competition: Qualification: Kateřina Elhotová 16, Tatiana Likhtarovich 13, Milena Prokešová 13, Michaela Stejskalová 11 - Pavel Slezák 15, Anthony Tucker 14, Matěj Svoboda 13, Jobi Wall 9 - Final: 1. Pavel Slezák 19, Kateřina Elhotová 16
- Celebrity Skill Contest: 1.Vyoral – Vyoral – Vyoral 1:29, 2. Birch – Patch – Ličartovský 1:57, 3. Lounová – Mishurová – Welsch 2:12
- Slam Dunk Contest: Qualification: Ondřej Šiška 33+30, Brison White 37+36, Lamb Autery 31+35, Donald Robinson 33+39, Tomáš Pomikálek 35+35 - Final:1. Brison White (J.Hradec) 32+40, 2. Donald Robinson 36+ missed the limit

- 2016 (I): Old Rifles – Young Rifles 153:113

Played on 3 March 2016 at hall Královka, in Ústí nad Labem. Quarters (37:29; 71:57; 115:91)

Old Rifles: Nicchaeus Doaks (Svitavy) 34, Jimmie Hunt (Kolín) 20, Pavel Bosák (Ústí nL) 20, Bojan Bakic (Koln) 19, Jakub Blažek (Opava) 15, Kamil Švrdlík (Pardubice) 12, Radek Nečas (Pardubice) 10, Luboš Stria (Děčín) 10, Pavel Slezák (Prostějov) 5, Jiří Welsch (Nymburk) 4, Michal Křemen (Brno) 2, Michal Čarnecký (Ústí nL) 2 – coach Ronen Ginzburg

Young Rifles: Brett Roseboro (Prostějov) 18, Luka Igrutinovic (Ostrava) 13, Lamb Autrey (Pardubice) 13, Lukáš Palyza (Prostějov) 12, Chasson Randle (Nymburk) 11, Vojtěch Hruban (Nymburk) 10, Igor Josipović (USK) 10, Ladislav Pecka (Ústí nL) 8, Tomáš Pomikálek (Děčín) 6, Jakub Šiřina (Opava) 5, Brison White (J.Hradec) 4, Tomáš Vyoral (Děčín) 3 – coach Pavel Budínský

- MVP: Nicchaeus Doaks (Tury Svitavy)
- Three-point shooting competition:Final: 1. Kateřina Elhotová 19, 2. Lukas Palyza
- Celebrity Skill Contest (Skills with wheelchair users): 1.Lukáš Konečný + Michal Čarnecký (Ústí nL), Michaela Vondráčková (Kara Trutnov) and wheelchair basketball representative Miroslav Šperk, 2. Karolína Elhotová, Jakub Šiřina, Jaroslav Menc and Fabiana Bytiqi
- Slam Dunk Contest Final: 1. Brison White (J.Hradec) – 2. Brett Roseboro

- 2016 (II): Old Rifles – Young rifles 122:141

Played on 29 December 2016, in Děčín . Quarters (24:34; 62:81; 90:105)

For the first time, Young rifles celebrated the victory.

Old Rifles: Pavel Slezák (Prostějov) 24, Pavel Bosák (Ústí nL) 22, Kamil Švrdlík (Pardubice) 14, Jakub Houška (Děčín) 12, Cory Abercrombie (Ústí nL) 11, Michal Křemen (Brno), Roman Marko (Prostějov) 10, Pavel Houška (Děčín) 10, Jimmie Hunt (Kolín) 5, Eugene Lawrence 3, Willie Bannister (Svitavy) and Jiří Welsch (Nymburk) 0 – coach Ronen Ginzburg

Young Rifles: Deshawn Painter (Ostrava) 29, Lukáš Palyza (Děčín) 26, Lamb Autrey (Pardubice) 17, Ladislav Pecka (Ústí nL) 14, Terell Lee Lipkins (J.Hradec) 13, Tomáš Pomikálek (Děčín) 12, Dominez Burnett (Pardubice) 9, Jaromír Bohačík (USK) 7, Jakub Krakovič (Děčín) 6, Tomáš Vyoral (Děčín) 3, Akexander Madsen (USK) 3, Howard Sant-Roos (Nymburk) 2 – coach Levell Sanders

- MVP: Deshawn Painter (MH Ostrava)
- Three-point shooting competition Final: 1. Kateřina Elhotová 18, 2. Michal Křemen 14
- Slam Dunk Contest Final: 1. Lamb Autrey (Pardubice) – 2. Tomáš Pomikálek

- 2017: Old Rifles – Young Rifles 133:122

Played on 30 December 2017, in Ústí nad Labem. Quarters (37:30; 57:63; 86:104)

Donald Robinson (Ústí nad Labem) scored achieved 45 points (11 three-step), 8 rebounds, 5 assists.

Old Rifles: Donald Robinson (Ústí nad Labem) 45, Mladen Primorac (Brno) 16.Kamil Švrdlík (Pardubice) 15, Tomáš Pomikálek (Děčín) 13, Robert Landa (Děčín) 12, Pavel Slezák (Svitavy) 8, Vojtěch Hruban (Nymburk) 7, Petr Benda (Nymburk) 5, Eugene Lawrence (Nymburk) 5, Bryan Smithson (Svitavy) 3, Jiří Welsch (Pardubice) 2, Jakub Šiřina (Opava) 0 – coach Oren Amiel (Nymburk)

Young Rifles: Kendrick Ray (Nymburk) 24, Christopher Fuller (Olomoucko) 19, Jaromír Bohačík (Nymburk) 14, Dominez Burnett (Pardubice) 11, Ladislav Pecka (Ústí nL) 10, Alexander Madsen (USK Praha) 9, Lukáš Stegbauer (Jindřichův Hradec) 8, Russell Woods (Ostrava) 7, Petr Šafarčík (Kolín) 7, Ondřej Šiška (Děčín) 5, Lee Skinner (Kolín) 4, Šimon Ježek (Děčín) 4 – coach Levell Sanders (Pardubice)

- MVP: Donald Robinson (Ústí nad Labem)
- Three-point shooting competition Final: 1. Final: Josef Potoček 14, 2. Alexander Madsen 8
- One on one (1 on 1) Challenge Final: Dominez Burnett – Milič Blagojevich 3:0
- Slam Dunk Contest Final: 1. Kendrick Ray (Nymburk) 50+49, 2. Donald Robinson 46+48

- 2018: Old Rifles – Young Rifles 135:136

Played on 30 December 2018 at Královka, in Prague. Quarters (37:30; 57:63; 86:104)

The teams were selected by the captains: Lukáš Palyza (MAZ) and Jaromír Bohačík (M.PUŠ).

Old Rifles: Anthony Walton 28, Pomikálek 22, Vojtěch Hruban 18, Švrdlík 14, Lamb Autrey 10, Marko 9, Lukáš Palyza 8, Pumprla 6, Vukosavljevic 6, Milan Stanojevič 5, Jakub Širina 5, Pavel Houška 4

Young Rifles: Javonte Douglas 26, Thomas Dunans 25, Jaromír Bohačík 17, Canda 16, Shafarčík 12, Carlson 11, Sehnal 8, Peck 8, Roby 6, Devonte Wallace 5, Puršl 2

- MVP: Thomas Dunans, BK Olomoucko
- 3-Point Shoot-out: 1. Donovan Jackson 20+22 / 2. Lukáš Palyza 17+19 / 3. Devonte Wallace 16/4. Lamb Autrey 14 /5. Lukáš Palek 12/6. Milan Stanojevic 10
- One on one (1 on 1) Challenge: QF1: Bryce Canda vs. Anthony Walton 1 - 3 / QF2: Sean O'Brien vs. Donovan Jackson 0:3 / QF3: Klint Carlson vs. Davell Roby 4 - 2 / QF4: Javonte Douglas vs. Devante Wallace 3 - 1. SF1: Anthony Walton vs. Donovan Jackson 2 - 4 / SF2: Klint Carlson vs. Javonte Douglas 1 - 4. Final: Donovan Jackson vs. Javonte Douglas 0:4
- Slam Dunk Contest: 1. Thomas Dunans 45+45+48+50 / 2. Brandon Boggs 37+48+49+46 / 3. Anthony Walton 37+40 /4. Charles Aiken 32+39

- 2020: Young Rifles – Old Rifles 129:128

Played on 19 January 2020 at Královka, in Ústí nad Labem. Quarters (27:33, 66:60, 106:95)

The teams were selected by the captains: Jakub Šiřina (MAZ) and Tomáš Vyoral (M.PUŠ).

Old Rifles: Jakub Šiřina (BK Opava), Lukáš Palyza (BK Olomoucko), Vojtěch Hruban (ERA Basketball Nymburk), Tomáš Pomikálek (BK ARMEX Děčín), Pavel Houška (SLUNETA Ústí) (starters) - Peda Stamenkovič (Kingspan Hradec Králové), Lamb Autrey (BK ARMEX Děčín), Adam Číž (BC GEOSAN Kolín), Luděk Jurečka (BK Opava), Martin Gniadek (BK Opava), Ladislav Pecka (SLUNETA Ústí, pivot), Kammeon Holsey (NH Ostrava). Coach: Tomáš Grepl (BK ARMEX Děčín). Top scorers: Puršl (25), Hankins (18), Mareš, Farský (po 15), Jaromír Bohačík (14) and Ondřej Sehnal (11)

Young Rifles: Tomáš Vyoral (BK ICU Pardubice), Jaromír Bohačík (ERA Basketball Nymburk), Michal Mareš (USK Prague), Martin Peterka (ERA Basketball Nymburk), Šimon Puršl (DEKSTONE Tuři Svitavy) (starters) - Viktor Půlpán (BK ICU Pardubice), Davell Roby (Basket Brno), Ondřej Sehnal (USK Prague), Eugene Crandall (DEKSTONE Tuři Svitavy), Spencer Svejcar (SLUNETA Mouth), Zach Hankins (ERA Basketball Nymburk). Coach: Antonín Pištěcký (SLUNETA Ústí). Top scorers: Width (20), Holsey (18), Autrey (17), Pomikalek (17), Pecka (15), Violin (14) Stamenkovič (11).

- MVP: Puršl (Svitavy).
- One on one (1 on 1) Challenge: Orzen Pavlovich (Pardubice)
- Slam Dunk Contest: Zach Hankins (Nymburk)
- 3-Point Shoot-out: Luděk Jurečka (Opava)

- 2024: EAST - WEST 88- 97

Played on 23 March 2024.

West: Ty Nichols 2, Tomas Pomikalek 6, Matej Svoboda 11, Vojtech Sykora 0, Sukhmail Mathon 16, Patrick Samoura 10, Lesley Varner Jr. 7, Ondrej Svec 3, AJ Walton 20, Lamb Autrey 4, Martin Svoboda 8, Ty Gordon 10

East: Terrell Brown-Soares 10, Kameron Chatman 8, Simon Pursl 2, Jakub Sirina 3 , Petr Safarcik 4, Adrio Bailey 17, Michal Svoboda 0, Zdravko Boskovic 2, Jakub Mokran 18, Elyjah Williams 12, Greg Lee 12, Jase Townsend 0

- MVP: AJ Walton, BK Děčín
  - 3-Point Shoot-out: Ludek Jurecka, BK Opava
  - Slam Dunk Contest: Adrio Bailey, BK NH Ostrava

- 2025: NORTH - SOUTH 101- 80

Played on 2 March 2025.

North: Omotayo Ogundiran 3, Jaden Campbell 3, Tomas Pomikalek 11, Jordan Dallas 5, Nighael Ceaser 9, Jelani Watson-Gayle 18, Maishe Dailey 12, Lesley Varner 21, Christian Bishop 9, Lubos Kovar 3, Matej safarik 2, Ody Oguama 5

South: Richard Balint 11, Michal Svoboda 0, Tomas Valentiny 13, Jan Karlovsky 6, Martin Svoboda 8, Jaron Fairweather 11, Adrio Bailey 11, Ethan Chargois 4, Simon Pursl 8, Robert Howard 0, Noah Carter 8, Jacob Evans III 0

- MVP:
  - 3-Point Shoot-out: Petr Slechta, Sokol Písek
  - Slam Dunk Contest: Milan Stranel, Basket Brno

== Wins by team (1995–present) ==
=== East vs West ===
Team	Wins
East All Stars	8
West All Stars	2

=== Czech vs World ===
Team	Wins
Czech All Stars	3
World All Stars	4

=== Old vs Young ===
Team	Wins
Old All Stars	3
Young All Stars	2

== Players with most selections ==
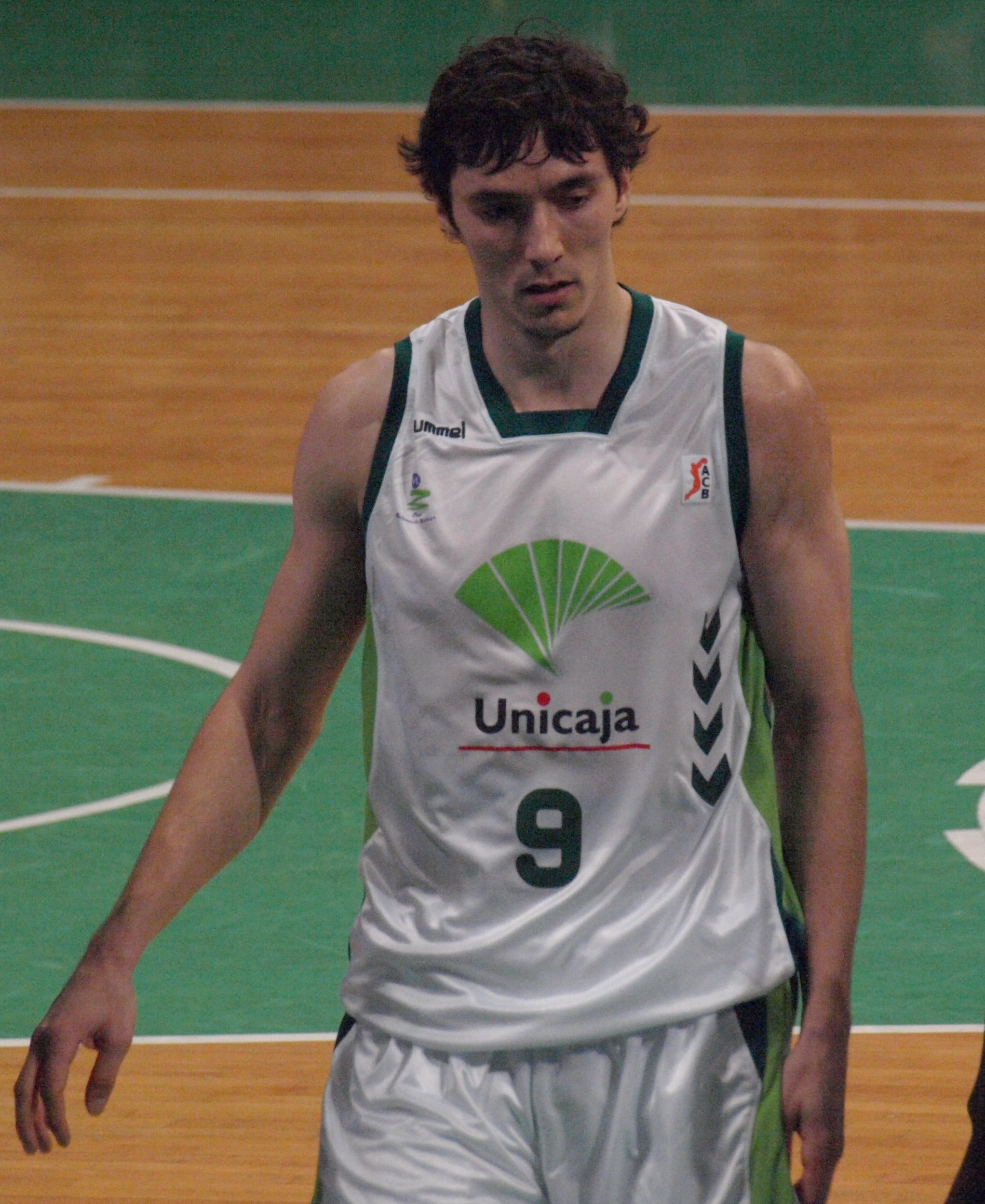
Jiri Welsch has been selected 6 times.

Player	All-Star	Editions	Notes
(Czech Republic) Petr Benda	11	2003-07, 2009, 2010, 2012, 2014, 2015, 2017	2003, 2007 not played
(Czech Republic) Petr Czudek	9	1995-98, 2002-06	
(Czech Republic) Ladislav Sokolovský	8	2000, 2002-07, 2010, 2015	2003 not played
(Czech Republic) Pavel Houška	8	2007, 2009-12, 2016 (II), 2018, 2020	
(United States) Levell Sanders	8	2000*, 2003, 2004*, 2005, 2007, 2011, 2014, 2015	2000, 2004 not played. Also selected as coach
(Czech Republic) Jozef Jelinek	7	1995-98, 2000, 2002, 2004	1x MVP, 1997 not played
(Czech Republic) Jakub Šiřina	7	2011, 2014, 2016 (I), 2017, 2018, 2020, 2024	
(Czech Republic) Pavel Miloš	7	1998*, 2001-05, 2007	3x Three-point winner, 1998, 2003 not played
(Canada) Corey Muirhead	6	2010, 2011-15	2x Slam-dunk winner, 2x MVP
(Czech Republic) Jiří Welsch	6	2000*, 2013, 2014, 2015, 2016 (I), 2016 (II)	2000 not played
(United States) Lamb Autrey	6	2015, 2016 (I), 2016 (II), 2018, 2020, 2024	1x Slam-dunk winner
(Czech Republic) Jan Svoboda	8	1995-98, 2002	
(United States) Tarvis Williams	4	2005, 2007-09	Slam-dunk winner 2005
(Slovakia) Radoslav Rančík	2	2006, 2007	

== See also ==
- National Basketball League (Czech Republic)
- Czech Basketball Player of the Year
- Polish Basketball All-Star Game

== Sources ==
- Czech Republic All-Star Game 2023–2025
- První 3 české All Star Game v hale Sparty Praha 1995, 1996, 1997
- Czech-Polish All-Star 2014
