= All-star game =

Exhibition game that purports to showcase the best players of a sports league

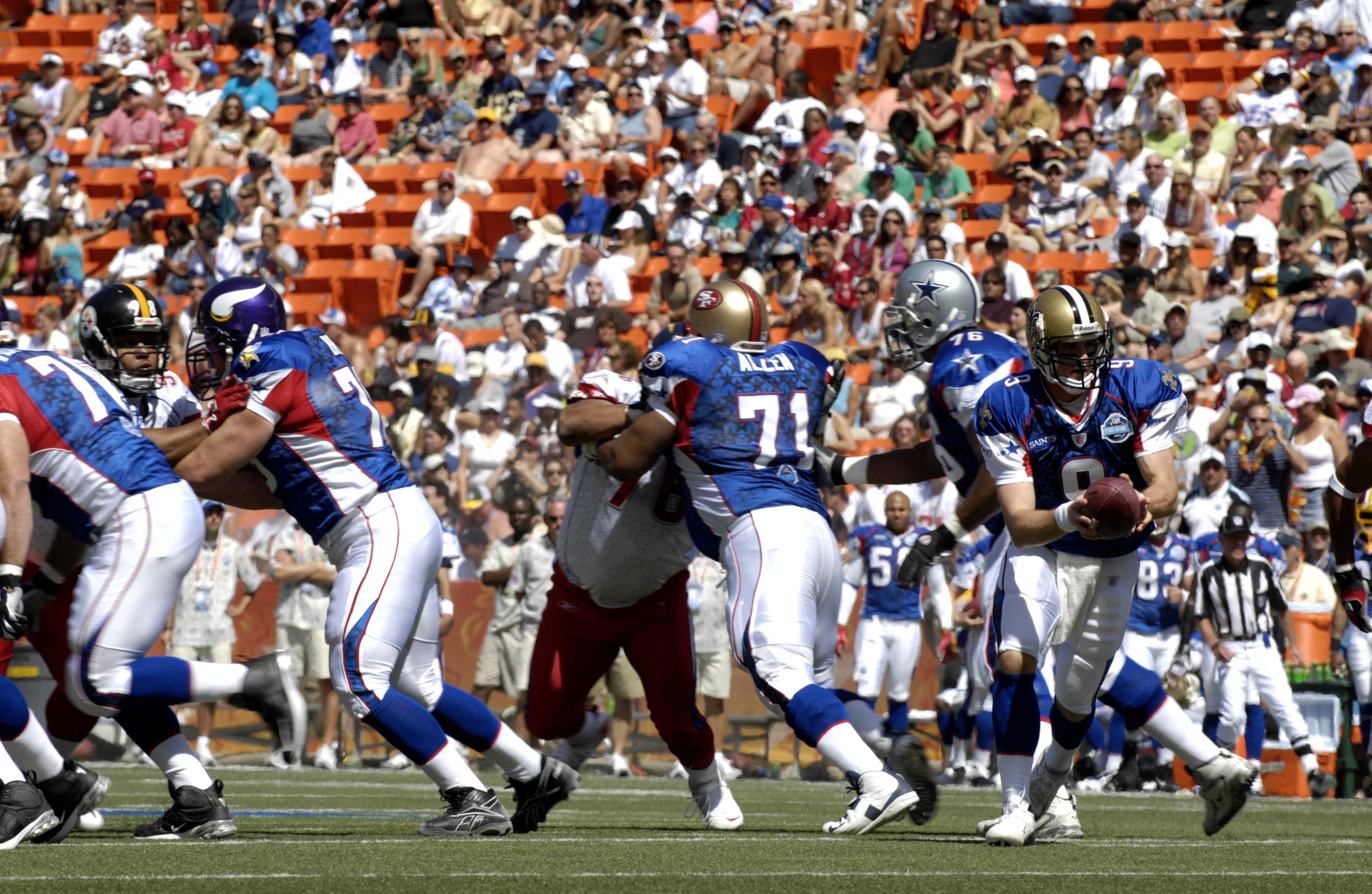
Action during the 2007 Pro Bowl, the all-star game of the National Football League. Note different team insignias on helmets.

An all-star game is an exhibition game that showcases the best players (the "stars") of a sports league. The exhibition is between two teams organized solely for the event, usually representing the league's teams based on region or division, but sometimes dividing the players by an attribute such as nationality. Selection of the players may be done by a vote of the coaches and/or news media; in professional leagues, fans may vote on some or all of the roster. An all-star game usually occurs at the midpoint of the regular season. An exception is American football's NFL Pro Bowl, which occurred at the end of the season.

All-star games are usually organized like regular games, but are often played with less emphasis on victory. Competing goals are to give many players time in the game and to avoid injury. In ice hockey, for example, there is no serious checking, while in American football no blitzing is allowed. In basketball, there is virtually no defense played until the final quarter. In contrast, the Australian State of Origin series involves physicality that often leads to on-field scuffles. The results, particularly in later years, have been met with overwhelming negative reactions from fans and sports media, criticizing players for not trying, and causing the games to have among the lowest ratings in a sports league season.

The current format of the NHL All-Star Game differs significantly from that of normal league games. Instead of a single game, the event is organized as a four-team knockout tournament, with each team representing one of the league's divisions. Additionally, each game within the event is contested as a single 20-minute period, making the playing time of the All-Star Game identical to that of a regulation NHL game. The most radical difference is the on-ice team composition—instead of five skaters and one goaltender at full strength, each team has three skaters and a goaltender. Due to the reduced team sizes, penalties that normally cause the penalized team to lose a skater instead give the non-penalized team an extra skater.

The term "all-star" is mainly used in North America. All-star games are rare in international sports, such as association football, where games between national teams are more popular than all-star games would be. In the United Kingdom, all-star teams are usually denoted with the Roman numeral corresponding to the number of players allowed on the field – for example, a soccer or cricket XI, a rugby league XIII and a rugby union XV.

Major League Baseball organized the first professional league all-star game as part of the 1933 World's Fair in Chicago. It was the brainchild of Arch Ward, then sports editor for the Chicago Tribune. Initially intended to be a one-time event, its great success resulted in playing the game annually. Ward's contribution was recognized by Major League Baseball in 1962 with the creation of the Arch Ward Trophy, given to the All-Star Game's most valuable player each year.

== Professional all-star games ==
=== North America ===
==== Major leagues ====
- Major League Baseball All-Star Game (National League vs. American League)
- National Basketball Association All-Star Game
  - The game has had two formats throughout its history:
    - The original format used from the first game in 1951 until 2017 pitted Eastern Conference and Western Conference all-star teams.
    - The 2018 to the 2023 All-Star games, followed a fantasy draft format, similar to the 2011–2015 format of the NHL All-Star Game (see below), involving the selection of players by a combination of fan, player, and media voting. The vote leaders for each conferences are then named as team captains for each all-star team, who then select players from the rest of the all-stars, regardless of the conference they play in.
    - The 2024 All-Star Game reverted to its original East vs. West format.
- National Hockey League All-Star Game
  - The game has had a number of formats throughout its history:
    - The original format, used from 1947 through 1968 with two exceptions, saw the previous season's Stanley Cup champions take on an "All-Star" team made up of the First and Second NHL All-Star Teams plus other star players.
    - In 1951 and 1952, the competing teams were the First NHL All-Star Team, supplemented with stars from the league's American franchises, and the Second NHL All-Star Team, supplemented with stars from Canadian franchises.
    - Beginning in 1969 and continuing through 2009, with some exceptions, the format was geographic—most recently Eastern Conference vs. Western Conference.
    - For 1979 and 1987, a single team comprising the NHL's best players faced the Soviet national ice hockey team in a two-game series.
    - From 1998 through 2002, the teams were divided by player nationality, with a "North America" team made up of Canadians and Americans and a "World" team drawn from the rest of the world.
    - In 2006, 2010 and 2014, the league did not hold an all-star game, instead releasing its players to play ice hockey at the Olympic Games. The league held an all-star game in addition to releasing its players for the Olympics in 1998 and 2002.
    - Due to the 2004–05 NHL lockout cancelling the entire season, the All-Star Game was not held in 2005. In 2013, the league did not hold an all-star game as well, as it omitted from the schedule because of the shortened season caused by the player lockout.
    - From 2011 to 2015, a fantasy draft took place that involved the selection of 42 players—six in fan voting, and the other 36 by the league. The selected players then chose two of these individuals as team captains.
    - From 2016 onward, the "All-Star Game" consists of a mini-tournament where teams representing the league's divisions compete against each other in abbreviated games lasting only 20 minutes (instead of the three 20-minute periods of normal NHL games).
- National Football League Pro Bowl
  - From 1938 to 1942, the NFL held an all-star game with the winner of that year's NFL Championship Game against an all-star team composed of players from the other teams (and, at least once, teams outside the NFL).
  - From 1951 to 2013, the Pro Bowl followed an inter-conference format (Eastern vs. Western from 1951 to 1969 and American Football Conference vs. National Football Conference since the AFL–NFL merger in 1970). The AFC vs NFC format was restored in 2017.
  - From 2014 to 2016 it followed a draft format, similar to the 2011–2015 format of the NHL All-Star Game (see above).

Note: In professional American football, the term "all-star game" can also refer to the American Football League All-Star game, played from 1961 to 1969; or the College All-Star Game, played from 1934 to 1976.

- Major League Soccer All-Star Game
  - The game has had several formats throughout its history:
    - Originally, the game pitted Eastern Conference and Western Conference all-star teams. This format was used for all games save one from 1996 through 2001, and also in 2004.
    - The 1998 game pitted an "MLS USA" team, consisting entirely of Americans, against an "MLS World" team drawn from all other nationalities.
    - The 2002 game matched an MLS all-star team against the US national team.
    - The 2003 game was the first in which an MLS all-star team played a visiting foreign club team. This format was used through the 2019 edition, with the exception of 2004. In the 2003 game, the visiting team was from Mexico; from 2005 to 2019, the visiting team was based in Europe.
    - The 2021 game was the first to incorporate its current format involving all-star teams from both MLS and Mexico's top league, Liga MX.
- NASCAR All-Star Race (Race winners from previous and current season, as well as Cup champions and All-Star Race winners from the previous 10 seasons)
- WNBA All-Star Game (usually Eastern Conference vs. Western Conference)
  - In 2004 and 2010, the east–west format was not followed; instead, the USA national team faced a team of WNBA all-stars. The league does not consider these games to be official All-Star Games.
  - From 2008 forward, no All-Star Game has been played in any Olympic year.
  - Since 2018, the All-Star Game has used a draft format similar to that used by the NHL in the 2011–2015 period. In the WNBA's implementation, fan voting determines the two team captains (though in the first game under the current format, Maya Moore declined the captain's role).

==== Minor leagues ====
- USAFL East vs West
- American Hockey League All-Star Game
- ECHL All-Star Game
- Legends Football League All-Fantasy Game (Eastern vs Western)
- Major League Lacrosse All-Star Game (Eastern Conference vs. Western Conference)
- National Lacrosse League All-Star Game (East Division vs. West Division)
- Major Indoor Soccer League All-Star Game (Format varies)
- Women's Professional Soccer All-Star Game
  - In the three years of the league's existence, two different formats were used.
    - The first game in 2009, which took place after the season, employed a format similar to that of recent MLS All-Star Games, with a team of WPS all-stars taking on a visiting foreign club team (specifically Umeå IK of Sweden).
    - The 2010 edition took place at midseason. Of the 36 players, 22 were selected through a voting process, and the other 14 were selected by the league. The top vote-getters among U.S. and international players, respectively Abby Wambach and Marta, were named captains. They picked their first 10 teammates from the remaining 20 All-Stars selected through the voting process, with the league then filling out each roster.
    - No All-Star Game was held in 2011, which turned out to be the league's final season, because the season ran up against the Women's World Cup.
  - The successor to WPS, the National Women's Soccer League (2013–present), has never held an all-star game.
- Triple-A All-Star Game (Baseball; International League vs. Pacific Coast League)
- Southern League All-Star Game (Baseball; North Division vs. South Division)
- AIFA Kickoff Classic (American Indoor Football Association All-Stars vs. expansion team)

==== Former events ====
- East–West All-Star Game (1933–1962, pairing teams of Negro league baseball players)
- Marlboro Challenge (1987–1992, CART series winners from the current and previous seasons)
- CFL All-Star Game (various years and formats)
- Double-A All-Star Game (1991–2002; baseball; players from American League-affiliated teams vs. players from National League-affiliated teams)

=== Other regions ===
==== Association football ====
- A-Leagues All Star Game – A selected team from the best of the Australian football (soccer) league. The A-League All Stars play an international club annually.
- J.League All-Star Soccer (Japan; J-WEST vs. J-EAST, generally)
- K League All-Star Game

==== Australian rules football ====
- E. J. Whitten Legends Game (Victoria vs. All Stars, a team representing the rest of Australia—annual)
- AFL Hall of Fame Tribute Match (Victoria vs. Dream Team—only edition in 2008)
- State of Origin for Bushfire Relief Match (2020, raised funds for recovery efforts following the 2019–20 Australian bushfire season)

==== Baseball ====
- Australian Baseball League All-Star Game (Team Australia vs. World All-Stars)
- Chinese Professional Baseball League All-Star Game (Red vs. White)
- Honkbal Hoofdklasse All-Star Game (Netherlands; North All-Stars vs. South All-Stars)
- KBO All-Star Game (Nanum vs. Dream)
- Nippon Professional Baseball All-Star Series

==== Basketball ====
===== Europe =====
- FIBA EuroStars
- FIBA Europe All-Star Game
- FIBA EuroCup All-Star Day
- ULEB All-Star Game
- Adriatic Basketball Association All-Star Game, ABA League
- Baltic Basketball All-Star Game, Baltic Basketball League
- Basketligan All-Star Game, Sweden
- BBL All-Star Game (Basketball Bundesliga, Germany; teams currently divided by player nationality as National [Germans] and International)
- Belgian Basketball All-Star Game, Belgium
- British Basketball League All-Star Game, British Basketball League
- BSL All-Star Game (Basketball Super League, Turkey; teams currently divided by the location of the individual players' clubs as Team Asia (Anatolia) and Team Europe (East Thrace)
- Bulgarian Basketball All-Star Game, Bulgaria
- Croatian Basketball All-Star Game, Croatia
- Cyprus Basketball All-Star Day, Cyprus
- Czech Basketball All-Star Game, Czech Republic
- DBL All-Star Gala (Dutch Basketball League; varying team compositions)
- HEBA Greek All Star Game (Greek Basket League; teams currently divided by player nationality as Greek and Rest of the World)
- Icelandic Basketball Association Men's All-Star Game, Iceland
- Israeli Basketball All-Star Game, Israel
- Liga ACB Presentation Games, Spain
- LNB All-Star Game (LNB Pro A, France; teams currently divided by players citizenship as French nationals and foreign players)
- Lega Basket All Star Game (Lega Basket Serie A, Italy; varying team compositions)
- LKL All-Star Game (Lithuania; varying team compositions)
- ÖBL All-Star Game, Austria
- Polish Basketball All-Star Game, Poland
- Portuguese Basketball All-Star Day, Portugal
- Slovenian Basketball All-Star Game, Slovenia
- YUBA All-Star Game, Yugoslavia

===== Other =====
- MPBL All-Star Game (Philippines; North vs. South)
- NBB All-Star Game (Brazil; teams currently divided by player nationality as Brasil and Mundo [World])
- NBL All-Star Game (Australia; varying team compositions, with the current format being North vs. South)
- Philippine Basketball Association All-Star Game (varying team compositions, with the current format being Team A vs. Team B, it follows a fantasy draft format where the top two vote-getters will be the team captains of both teams, the remaining players will be selected from a 24-man list via draft.)

==== Ice hockey ====
- Kontinental Hockey League All-Star Game — Two different formats have been used:
  - In the game's first two editions in 2009 and 2010, the competing sides were divided by player nationality: "Team Russia" and "Team World".
  - Since then, the competing teams have been "Team East" and "Team West", divided between the league's two conferences.

==== Kart racing ====
- Masters of Paris-Bercy
- CIK-FIA Monaco Kart Cup – all-star races held in several editions

==== Pesäpallo ====
- Itä–Länsi-ottelu – East-West Finland pesäpallo match that usually fields top league Superpesis players, along with corresponding matches at various youth tiers.

==== Rugby league ====
- National Rugby League All Stars Game – (Indigenous All Stars vs NRL All Stars)

Note: This annual game involves a publicly voted selection of the best club players from the league versus an Aboriginal team in honour of reconciliation.

- National Rugby League State of Origin (NSW v QLD)

==== Volleyball ====
- Volleyball All-Star Showcase – joint all-star event in the Philippines
  - Premier Volleyball League All-Star Game (Team A vs. Team B)
  - Spikers' Turf All-Star Game (Team A vs. Team B)

== College all-star games ==
Football

- Aztec Bowl, features an all-star Mexican team and, currently, an NCAA Division III all-star team
- Blue–Gray Football Classic (defunct)
- Casino del Sol College All-Star Game (originally the Eastham Energy All-Star Game) (defunct)
- Challenge Bowl (defunct), see Kingdome#Challenge Bowl
- College All-Star Game (defunct), featured the defending NFL champions and an all-star team of recent college graduates
- East–West Shrine Bowl
- HBCU Legacy Bowl
- Hula Bowl
- Magnolia Gridiron All-Star Classic (defunct)
- Mahi Shrine North–South College All-Star Classic (defunct)
- Medal of Honor Game
- NFLPA Collegiate Bowl (defunct)
- Texas vs The Nation (defunct)
- Tropical Bowl
- North–South All-American Game (defunct)
- North–South All-Star Classic (defunct)
- North–South Shrine Game (defunct)
- Senior Bowl

Basketball

- NCAA All-Star Game (Philippines; Heroes vs. Saints)
- Reese's College All-Star Game (defunct)
- UAAP NCAA All-Star Game (UAAP vs NCAA; defunct)

Other sports

- North–South Senior All-Star Game, the NCAA men's lacrosse all-star games

== High school all-star games ==
High school baseball

- Under Armour All-America Baseball Game
- Perfect Game All-American Classic (East vs. West)

High school basketball

- McDonald's All-American Game — featuring the most highly recruited high school players from across the nation.
- Jordan Brand Classic – similar game among blue chip athletes
- Capital Classic – longest-running high school all-star basketball game in the United States
- Kentucky Derby Festival Basketball Classic – defunct, played annually in Louisville, Kentucky at Freedom Hall and featured top high school boys basketball players from across the country

High school football

- U.S. Army All-American Bowl
- Under Armour All-America Game
- Offense-Defense All-American Bowl
- NUC All-World Gridiron Classic
- Alabama–Mississippi All-Star Classic (Alabama vs. Mississippi)
- Big 33 Football Classic (Pennsylvania vs. Maryland)
- Bayou Bowl (Houston metropolitan area, Texas vs. Louisiana)
- Don Raabe Big 30 Charities Classic (Southern Tier, New York vs. Northern Tier, Pennsylvania)
- Lions Club All-Star High School Football Classic (Erie County, New York vs. Niagara County, New York)
- Maryland Crab Bowl (Washington, D.C. vs. Baltimore)
- Oil Bowl (Texas vs. Oklahoma)
- DFW Bowl (high school) All Star Football Game featuring top players from (Dallas) vs. top players from (Fort Worth). The game is organized by North American All Stars. The game is also referred to as the North Texas East/West Classic.
- Dunmore Lions Club Dream Game (City vs. County) (Scranton, Pennsylvania)

(Longest running football all star game in the country. EST. 1935)

- Carolina Bowl "Senior Showcase" (North Carolina vs. South Carolina)

(www.CarolinaBowl.com / EST. 2015)

High school hockey

- CCM Hockey Showcase

High school lacrosse

- Under Armour All-American Lacrosse Game

== See also ==
- Hall of Fame Game (disambiguation)
- Race of Champions (disambiguation)
