= Crab Bowl =

The term Crab Bowl may refer to:

- Crab Bowl Classic, the college football rivalry game between the University of Maryland and the United States Naval Academy

- The Crab Bowl trophy awarded to the winner of the rivalry game since 2010.

- Maryland Crab Bowl, an annual high school football all-star game
