= Trevor Williams (American football) =

American football player (born 1993)

No. 42, 24, 22, 41
- Position: Cornerback

Personal information
- Born: September 15, 1993 (age 33); Baltimore, Maryland, U.S.
- Listed height: 5 ft 11 in (1.80 m)
- Listed weight: 191 lb (87 kg)

Career information
- High school: Calvert Hall (Towson, Maryland)
- College: Penn State (2012–2015)
- NFL draft: 2016: undrafted

Career history
- San Diego / Los Angeles Chargers (2016–2019); Arizona Cardinals (2019); Philadelphia Eagles (2020); Jacksonville Jaguars (2020)*; Pittsburgh Steelers (2020)*
- * Offseason or practice squad member only

Career NFL statistics
- Total tackles: 113
- Fumble recoveries: 1
- Pass deflections: 23
- Interceptions: 3
- Stats at Pro Football Reference

Trevor Williams (born September 15, 1993) is an American former professional football player who was a cornerback for the San Diego / Los Angeles Chargers, Arizona Cardinals, and Philadelphia Eagles of the National Football League (NFL). He played high school football at Calvert Hall College High School in Towson, Maryland, where he was a two-year letterman and two-year team captain. He was named first-team All-State his senior year in 2011. Williams played college football for the Penn State Nittany Lions for four years. He was named honorable mention All-Big Ten Conference in 2014 and 2015. He played in 49 games during his college career, recording 84 tackles and five interceptions. After going undrafted in the 2016 NFL draft, he signed with the Chargers. He started 15 games for the Chargers in 2017 due to a season-ending injury to Jason Verrett. Despite being graded by Pro Football Focus as the 10th highest performing cornerback of the 2017 season, Williams was later benched in 2018 and struggled with injuries before being released by the Chargers in October 2019. He then went on to play two games for the Cardinals in 2019 and two games for the Eagles in 2020. He was also a member of the practice squads of the Jacksonville Jaguars and Pittsburgh Steelers in 2020 but did not appear in any games for either team.

== Early life ==
Williams was a two-year letterman and two-year team captain at Calvert Hall College High School in Towson, Maryland, where he played wide receiver and free safety. He garnered All-Metro and All-Maryland Interscholastic Athletic Association (MIAA) accolades for his junior season in 2010 as the team finished with an 11–1 record and won their first conference championship since 1982. As a senior in 2011, he earned All-MIAA, First Team All-State, and First Team All-Metro honors. Williams recorded 99 receptions for 1,180 yards and 15 touchdowns in his senior year. He also had 31 tackles, four interceptions and six pass breakups as a senior. After his senior season, he was invited to play in the Crab Bowl and the Chesapeake Bowl. In February 2011, Williams was the offensive Most Valuable Player at the Next Level Nation Elite Showcase.

In the class of 2012, he was rated a three-star wide receiver recruit by Rivals.com and 247Sports.com. He was rated a two-star wide receiver recruit by ESPN.com. Williams was also rated the No. 173 wide receiver in the country by ESPN.com and the No. 179 wide receiver in the country by 247Sports.com. He was also rated both a three-star wide receiver recruit and the No. 147 wide receiver in the country on 247Sports.com's composite rating, which takes into account the ratings of all the other major recruiting services in the country. He was rated a three-star safety recruit and the No. 86 safety in the country by Scout.com.

Williams committed to Penn State on January 22, 2012. He also received offers from Bryant, Morgan State, Toledo, VMI and West Virginia. He had initially committed to West Virginia in July 2011 but later switched to Penn State.

== College career ==
Williams played for the Penn State Nittany Lions of Pennsylvania State University from 2012 to 2015. He played wide receiver in 2012 before moving to cornerback for his final three seasons.

In 2012, Williams appeared in 12 games, but started just one of them, and caught 10 passes for 97 yards. He also returned four kickoffs for an average of 19.8 yards. He converted to cornerback during spring practice in 2013. He played in 12 games, with six starts, during the 2013 season and recorded 24 tackles, eight pass breakups and two interceptions.

2014 saw Williams appear in 12 games, of which he started in all of them, and total 27 tackles, two interceptions, five pass breakups and one forced fumble. He was named the Big Ten Conference Defensive Player of the Week after recording five tackles and two interceptions against Rutgers on September 13. He missed the game against Temple on November 15 due to an undisclosed injury. Williams earned Honorable Mention All-Big Ten honors.

He played in 13 games, and started all of them, in 2015 and recorded 33 tackles and one interception. He was named Honorable Mention All-Big Ten for the second consecutive year. Williams also won the Ridge Riley Memorial Award, which is given to the Penn State football player that "exhibits the core values of sportsmanship, scholarship, leadership and friendship.

He played in 49 career games for Penn State, recording 84 tackles and five interceptions. He graduated with a degree in recreation, parks and tourism management.

== Professional career ==
=== Pre-draft ===
Williams was ranked as the 30th best cornerback in the 2016 NFL draft by NFLDraftScout.com.

Pre-draft measurables
Height	Weight	Arm length	Hand span	40-yard dash	10-yard split	20-yard split	20-yard shuttle	Three-cone drill	Vertical jump	Broad jump	Bench press
5 ft 11 1/4 in (1.81 m)	191 lb (87 kg)	31 1/8 in (0.79 m)	8 1/2 in (0.22 m)	4.44 s	1.57 s	2.60 s	4.22 s	6.80 s	35.5 in (0.90 m)	10 ft 5 in (3.18 m)	16 reps
All values from Penn State's Pro Day

=== San Diego / Los Angeles Chargers ===
==== 2016 ====
After going undrafted in the 2016 draft, Williams signed a three-year, $1.62 million contract, with the San Diego Chargers on May 10, 2016. Throughout training camp, he competed for a roster spot and a job as a backup cornerback against Greg Ducre, Richard Crawford, Terrell Chestnut, and Larry Scott. On September 3, the Chargers waived Williams as part of their final roster cuts. After clearing waivers, he was signed to their practice squad the following day.

On October 7, the Chargers promoted Williams to the active roster after starting cornerback Jason Verrett partially tore his ACL five days earlier. On October 9, Williams made his professional regular season debut during the Chargers' 34–31 loss at the Oakland Raiders, appearing in 21 snaps on special teams. The following week, he recorded his first career tackle in a 21–13 victory over the Denver Broncos. On November 27 in Week 12, he made his first career start during a 21–13 win against the Houston Texans after Brandon Flowers suffered a serious concussion the previous week. Williams recorded two tackles and a pass break up during the Week 12 victory. He returned to a backup role in Week 13, but then started the final four games of the 2016 season. In Week 16, Williams collected a season-high seven combined he in the Chargers' 20–17 loss at the Cleveland Browns. In Week 17, Williams recorded a season-high six solo tackles in a 37–27 loss to the Kansas City Chiefs. He finished his rookie season with 31 combined tackles (26 solo) and five pass breakups in 12 games and five starts.

==== 2017 ====
In 2017, the team moved to Los Angeles and became the Los Angeles Chargers. Williams was named the starting cornerback for Week 2 after Verrett suffered a season-ending knee injury in Week 1. Williams then proceeded to start the next 15 games. On October 1, he recorded a season-high seven solo tackles and a pass deflection in the 26–24 loss at the Philadelphia Eagles. In Week 6, he broke up two passes, made one tackle, and recorded his first career interception off a pass attempt by Derek Carr in the Chargers' 17–16 win at the Raiders. On November 19, Williams recorded a season-high three pass deflections, three solo tackles, and intercepted Buffalo Bills quarterback Nathan Peterman during Los Angeles' 54–24 victory. Overall, he played in all 16 games, starting 15, in 2017, recording 56 tackles, 13 passes defensed, and two interceptions. Williams received an overall grade of 88.5 from Pro Football Focus, which was the 10th best overall grade among all qualifying cornerbacks in 2017.

==== 2018 ====
Williams returned as a starting cornerback in 2018 after Verrett tore his Achilles tendon on the first day of training camp. However, Williams himself then suffered an ankle injury early on in training camp that caused him to miss all four of the team's preseason games. Regardless, he opened the regular season as the starter. On September 30, he recorded eight combined tackles, made a pass deflection, and returned an interception for an 86-yard gain during a 29–27 win against the San Francisco 49ers in Week 4. Overall, Williams started the first seven games of the season before being benched in favor of Michael Davis for the eighth game of the season against the Seattle Seahawks. Williams was then inactive for four of the next five games before being placed on injured reserve on December 13, 2018.

==== 2019 ====
Williams was inactive for the first game of the 2019 season, before being placed on injured reserve on September 11 with a quadriceps injury. He was waived from injured reserve on October 7, 2019.

=== Arizona Cardinals ===
On October 8, 2019, Williams was claimed off waivers by the Arizona Cardinals. He appeared in two games for the Cardinals, playing 16 snaps on special teams, before being released on October 23.

=== Philadelphia Eagles ===
On January 10, 2020, Williams signed a reserve/future contract with the Philadelphia Eagles. On July 21, he was released, but was later re-signed on August 26. He was waived again on September 4 and re-signed to the practice squad two days later. Williams was elevated to the active roster on September 19 for the team's Week 2 game against the Los Angeles Rams, appearing in two snaps on defense, before reverting to the practice squad after the game. He was promoted to the active roster again on September 24 for the Week 3 game against the Cincinnati Bengals, appearing in 32 snaps on defense and nine snaps on special teams while also totaling two solo tackles, one assisted tackle, and one pass breakup. He was placed on injured reserve on October 3 with a rib injury. Williams was released from injured reserve on October 20.

=== Jacksonville Jaguars ===
On December 7, 2020, Williams was signed to the practice squad of the Jacksonville Jaguars. He was released on December 14, 2020.

=== Pittsburgh Steelers ===
On January 6, 2021, the Pittsburgh Steelers signed Williams to their practice squad. On January 14, he signed a reserve/futures contract with the Steelers. He was released on May 7, 2021.
