= Adriatic Basketball Association All-Star Game =

ABA All-Star Game
- Status: Inactive
- Frequency: Annually
- Inaugurated: 2006
- Most recent: 2007
- Organizer: ABA League

The Adriatic Basketball Association All-Star Game was a basketball event which was organised by the ABA League, a regional competition featuring clubs from former Yugoslavia and countries such as (Bosnia and Herzegovina, Croatia, Montenegro, North Macedonia, Serbia and Slovenia). The All-Star Game was played for two seasons, in 2006–07 and 2007–08 and featured a game between East and West, a slam-dunk and a three-point shoot contest.

== List of games ==
Bold: Team that won the game.

Year	Date	Arena	City	Team	Score	Team	MVP
2006	December 27	Tivoli Hall	Ljubljana	**West**	**134**-118	East	(Canada) Carl English
2007	December 12	Tivoli Hall	Ljubljana	West	113-**136**	**East**	(Montenegro) Nikola Peković

== Slam-Dunk champions ==
Year	Player	Team
2006	(Slovenia) Miha Zupan	Union Olimpija
2007	(Serbia) Ilija Pavković	KK Vojvodina

== Three-point shoot contest ==
Year	Winner	Team
2006	(Finland) Teemu Rannikko	Union Olimpija
2007	(Serbia) Tadija Dragićević	KK Crvena Zvezda

== 2006 All-Star Game ==
=== Team rosters ===
**WEST**
Player	Team
(Croatia) Davor Kus	(Croatia) Cibona Zagreb
(Finland) Teemu Rannikko	(Slovenia) Union Olimpija
(Georgia (country)) Manuchar Markoishvili	(Slovenia) Union Olimpija
(Slovenia) Marko Milić	(Slovenia) Union Olimpija
(North Macedonia) Todor Gečevski	(Croatia) KK Zadar
(Croatia) Ante Tomić	(Croatia) KK Zagreb
(United States) Dwayne Broyles	(Croatia) KK Zagreb
(Slovenia) Smiljan Pavić	(Slovenia) Helios Suns
(Croatia) Robert Troha	(Slovenia) Helios Suns
(United States) Levour Warren	(Croatia) Cibona Zagreb
(Bosnia and Herzegovina) (Slovenia) Emir Preldžić	(Slovenia) Slovan Ljubljana
(Slovenia) Miloš Paravinja	(Slovenia) Slovan Ljubljana
(Canada) Carl English	(Croatia) KK Zadar
Coach
(Croatia) Dražen Anzulović (Croatia) Dario Gjergja	(Croatia) Cibona Zagreb (Croatia) Cibona Zagreb (assistant)

**EAST**
Player	Team
(Bosnia and Herzegovina) Saša Vasiljević	(Bosnia and Herzegovina) Bosna Sarajevo
(Montenegro) Goran Jeretin	(Montenegro) Budućnost Podgorica
(Serbia) Milan Gurović	(Serbia) KK Crvena zvezda
(Serbia) Zoran Erceg	(Serbia) FMP Belgrade
(Serbia) Bojan Popović	(Serbia) KK Crvena zvezda
(Bosnia and Herzegovina) Edin Bavčić	(Bosnia and Herzegovina) Bosna Sarajevo
(Serbia) Milenko Tepić	(Serbia) KK Partizan
(Bosnia and Herzegovina) Ivan Opačak	(Bosnia and Herzegovina) HKK Široki
(Slovenia) Nebojsa Joksimović	(Serbia) Hemofarm Vršac
(Serbia) Predrag Šuput	(Serbia) Hemofarm Vršac
(Montenegro) Nikola Peković	(Serbia) KK Partizan
(Serbia) Aleksandar Rašić	(Serbia) FMP Belgrade
Coach
(Serbia) Vlada Vukoičić (Serbia) Goran Radonjić	(Serbia) FMP Belgrade (Montenegro) Budućnost Podgorica

=== Report ===
December 27, 2006, Tivoli Hall, Ljubljana, Slovenia: West - East 134-118 (Quarters: 40–33,77-62, 107–91)
WEST (Dražen Anzulović, Dario Gjergja): Davor Kus 15, Teemu Rannikko 7, Manuchar Markoishvili 15, Marko Milić 10, Todor Gećevski 8 - Ante Tomić 2, Dwayne Broyles 12, Smiljan Pavić 8, Robert Troha 6, Levour Warren 13, Emir Preldžić 7, Miloš Paravinja 2, Carl English 29.
EAST (Vlada Vukoičić, Goran Radonjić): Saša Vasiljević 4, Goran Jeretin 5, Milan Gurović 15, Zoran Erceg 8, Bojan Popović 17 - Edin Bavčić 4, Milenko Tepić 11, Ivan Opačak 12, Nebojša Joksimović 13, Predrag Šuput 12, Nikola Peković 12, Aleksandar Rašić 5.

== 2007 All-Star Game ==
=== Team rosters ===
**WEST**
Player	Team
(Slovenia) Marko Milić	(Slovenia) Union Olimpija
(North Macedonia) Todor Gečevski	(Croatia) KK Zadar
(Slovenia) Goran Dragić	(Slovenia) Union Olimpija
(Croatia) Ante Tomić	(Croatia) KK Zagreb
(Croatia) Jakov Vladović	(Croatia) KK Zagreb
(Bosnia and Herzegovina) Jasmin Hukić	(Slovenia) Union Olimpija
(Bosnia and Herzegovina) Andrija Stipanović	(Slovenia) KK Split
(Croatia) Damjan Rudež	(Slovenia) KK Split
(Croatia) Jure Lalić	(Croatia) KK Zadar
(United States) Corey Brewer	(Croatia) KK Zadar
(Croatia) Robert Troha	(Slovenia) Helios Suns
(Croatia) Lukša Andrić	(Croatia) KK Cibona
Coach
(Croatia) Aleksandar Petrović (Slovenia) Memi Bečirovič	(Croatia) KK Zadar (Slovenia) Union Olimpija

**EAST**
Player	Team
(Montenegro) Nikola Peković	(Serbia) KK Partizan
(United States) (Montenegro) Omar Cook	(Serbia) KK Crvena Zvezda
(Serbia) Tadija Dragičević	(Serbia) KK Crvena Zvezda
(United States) (Belize) Milton Palacio	(Serbia) KK Partizan
(Serbia) (Montenegro) Vladimir Golubović	(Serbia) Vojvodina Srbijagas
(Serbia) Milenko Topić	(Serbia) KK Partizan
(Slovenia) Nebojsa Joksimović	(Serbia) Hemofarm Vršac
(Croatia) Siniša Štemberger	(Bosnia and Herzegovina) HKK Široki
(Slovenia) Goran Jagodnik	(Serbia) Hemofarm Vršac
(Serbia) Vladan Vukosavljević	(Serbia) Hemofarm Vršac
(Serbia) Vladimir Micov	(Montenegro) Budućnost Podgorica
(Bosnia and Herzegovina) Nemanja Gordić	(Montenegro) Budućnost Podgorica
Coach
(Serbia) Duško Vujošević (Montenegro) Stevan Karadžić	(Serbia) KK Partizan (Serbia) KK Crvena Zvezda

=== Report ===
December 12, 2007, Tivoli Hall, Ljubljana, Slovenia: East - West 136-113 (Quarters: 26–33, 57–59, 94-94)
EAST (Duško Vujošević, Stevan Karadžić: Nikola Peković 26, Omar Cook, Tadija Dragičević 22, Milenko Tepić, Nebojša Joksimović, Milton Palacio, Vladimir Golubović, Siniša Štemberger, Vladan Vukosavljević 18, Goran Jagodnik, Vladimir Micov, Nemanja Gordić.
WEST (Aleksandar Petrović, Memi Bečirović): Marko Milić, Goran Dragić, Jakov Vladović, Jasmin Hukić, Todor Gečevski, Damjan Rudež 13, Ante Tomić, Corey Brewer 22, Andrija Stipanović, Jure Lalić, Damjan Rudež, Robert Troha 17, Lukša Andrić.

== Players with most appearances ==
Player	All-Star	Editions	MVP
(Montenegro) Nikola Peković	2	2006, 2007	2007
(Slovenia) Marko Milić	2	2006, 2007	-
(Serbia) Milenko Topić	2	2006, 2007	-
(Slovenia) Nebojša Joksimović	2	2006, 2007	-
(Croatia) Ante Tomić	2	2006, 2007	-
(North Macedonia) Todor Gečevski	2	2006, 2007	-

== See also ==
- Baltic Basketball All-Star Game
