= Ashante Johnson =

American former professional basketball player

Personal information
- Born: May 12, 1976 (age 49) San Diego, California, U.S.
- Listed height: 6 ft 9 in (2.06 m)
- Listed weight: 215 lb (98 kg)

Career information
- High school: Scripps Ranch (San Diego, California)
- College: Utah (1995–1997); Cañada College (1997–1998); Kansas (1998–2000)
- NBA draft: 2000: undrafted
- Playing career: 2000–2010
- Position: Forward

Career history
- 2000: Dijon
- 2001: San Diego Wildfire
- 2001–2002: Pyrbasket
- 2002: Dodge City Legend
- 2002–2005: Nymburk
- 2005–2006: Aisin Seahorses
- 2006–2007: S.L. Benfica
- 2007–2008: Ironi Nahariya
- 2008–2009: Atomerőmű SE
- 2009: Hapoel Afula
- 2009–2010: Zain

Career highlights
- Czech Rep. Cup Final Four (2003); NBL All-Star (2003) MVP (2004) Slam Dunk Winner (2005); 2x NBL champion (2004, 2005); Czech Republic Cup champion (2005); Eurobasket.com All-Czech Rep. League Player of the Year (2003, 2004); Eurobasket.com All-Czech Rep. League Forward of the Year (2003, 2004, 2005); Eurobasket.com All-Czech Rep. League Import Player of the Year (2003, 2004); Eurobasket.com All-Czech Rep. League 1st Team (2003, 2004, 2005); FIBA Europe League All-Star Game ( 2004); Eurobasket.com All-FIBA Europe League 2nd Team ( 2004); Eurobasket.com FIBA Europe League All-Imports Team (2004); Czech Rep. NBL Regular Season Champion ( 2004, 2005); Portuguese Supercup Finalist ( 2006); Portuguese League Semifinals ( 2007); Portuguese League Regular Season Runner-Up ( 2007); Israeli Premier League Semifinals ( 2008)

Ashante Dankail Johnson (born May 12, 1976) is an American former professional basketball player who played the majority of his 10-year career in Europe.

== College career ==
After graduating from San Diego's Scripps Ranch High School in 1995, Johnson joined the Utah Utes men's basketball team where he redshirted the 1995–96. He played out his freshman season at Utah in 1996–97 before transferring to Cañada College in Redwood City, California, for his sophomore season in 1997–98. After averaging 23 points and 14 rebounds per game as a sophomore, Johnson transferred to Kansas where he played out his junior and senior seasons.

== Professional career ==
Johnson went undrafted in the 2000 NBA draft. In August 2000, he signed a one-year deal with JDA Dijon Basket of the LNB Pro A. After a disappointing start to the season, he was released by the club in late 2000. Returning home, he played briefly for the short-lived San Diego Wildfire of the American Basketball Association, then met a Finnish coach at a workout camp in Los Angeles. The coach liked what he saw and signed him for the 2001–02 season. Johnson went on to average 26 points and 10 rebounds per game for Pyrbasket Tampere.

After a one-game stint for the Dodge City Legend during the 2002 USBL season, Johnson signed with ČEZ Basketball Nymburk of the Czech Republic for the 2002–03 season. Teaming up with point guard Maurice Whitfield, Johnson injected a dose of above-the-rim dash to the floor-bound Czech game. Nymburk, which only three years before was toiling in the Czech league's second division, fought its way to the brink of an NBL title.

With a bit more name recognition and professional experience, Johnson returned to California and secured a spot at the Kings' veterans training camp. Gunning for a slot on one of the NBA's most loaded teams, he played well and hung on into the fall preseason. However, he was released two weeks before the start of the 2003–04 NBA season, the next-to-last cut before the team set its roster. Johnson subsequently returned to the Czech Republic where he and Whitfield helped Nymburk close out the regular season on April 1 with a 30–2 record. Redeeming themselves from just missing out in 2002–03, Nymburk and Johnson went on to win their maiden championship. The club has since gone on to win every year since, having recently recorded their 11th championship in 2013–14.

After spending another season and winning another championship with Nymburk in 2004–05, Johnson joined the Aisin Seahorses of the Japanese Super League for the 2005–06 season. He then joined S.L. Benfica of Portugal for the 2006–07 and Ironi Nahariya of Israel for the 2007–08 season.

After beginning the 2008–09 season with Nahariya, Johnson signed with Atomerőmű SE of Hungary in October 2008.

On August 16, 2009, Johnson signed with Hapoel Afula for the 2009–10 season. In December 2009, he left Afula and signed with the Zain Club of the Jordanian Premier Basketball League where he had a short stint before leaving the club in January 2010.
