= Baltic Basketball All-Star Game =

Defunct basketball all-star game in the Baltic states

BBL All-Star Game
- Status: Inactive
- Inaugurated: 2006
- Most recent: 2008
- Organizer: BBL

The Baltic Basketball All-Star Game (known also as SEB-BBL All-Stars Game) was a basketball event organised by the Baltic Basketball League. It was established in 2006, and it lasted for 3 seasons. Players from the Baltic Basketball League teams were eligible for selection.

The biggest name to feature in the event is Kenny Anderson, an NBA All-Star (1994).

== Background ==
The Baltic Basketball League (BBL) was founded in 2004 as a Baltic states regional basketball league. It was considered the continuation of the NEBL that featured teams from the former Soviet Union.

The BBL mainly focused on teams from the Baltic states, but later also teams from Sweden, Russia, Kazakhstan, Finland, and Belarus participated in the Baltic League. In 2006, alongside the launch of the Adriatic Basketball Association All-Star Game from the ABA League, the BBL started its own event.

It dissolved after the 2017–18 season, the league announced that it was suspending its operations. Now the ENBL seems like its successor.

== Results ==
Bold: Team that won the game.

Season	Date	City	Team	Score	Team	MVP	Team
2005–06	4 March 2006	Riga, Latvia	**Baltic Stars**	**134**- 126	Foreign Stars	(Latvia) Ainars Bagatskis	(Latvia) Barons Riga
2006–07	3 February 2007	Kaunas, Lithuania	Baltic Stars	98 - **100**	**Foreign Stars**	(United States) Tanoka Beard	(Lithuania) BC Žalgiris
2007-08	2 February 2008		Baltic Stars	136- **154**	**Foreign Stars**	(Croatia) Vladimir Stimac	(Latvia) Valmiera

== Slam-dunk contest ==
Season	Winner	Team
2005–06	(Latvia) Klavs Ansons	(Latvia) Livu alus/Liepaja
2006–07	(Lithuania) Mantas Kalnietis	(Lithuania) BC Žalgiris
2007–08	(Bosnia and Herzegovina) Bojan Pelkic	(Estonia) BC Kalev/Cramo

== Three-point shootout ==
Season	Winner	Team
2005–06	(Latvia) Ainars Bagatskis	(Latvia) Barons Rīga
2006–07	(Lithuania) Martynas Gecevicius	(Lithuania) BC Sakalai
2006–07	(Latvia) Ingus Bankevics	(Latvia) Valmiera

== Topscorers ==
Season	Winner	Team
2005–06	(United States) Tanoka Beard	(Latvia) BC Žalgiris
2006–07	(Estonia) Martin Muursepp	(Estonia) Tartu Ülikool
2007–08	(Croatia) Vladimir Stimac	(Latvia) Valmiera

== Score sheets (2006-2008) ==
- 1st All-Star Game 2005-06:

DATE: 4 March 2006
VENUE: Riga, Latvia
SCORE: Baltic Stars 134 - Foreign Stars 126

Baltic Stars: Darius Lavrinovic 27 (8 reb), Ainars Bagatskis 23, Simas Jasaitis 17, Paulius Jankūnas 16, Roberts Štelmahers 13 (11 ass), Gintautas Matulis 11, Tanel Tein 9, Janis Blums 6, Pauliukenas 5, Akselis Vairogs 4, Gregor Arbet 3.

Foreign Stars: Tanoka Beard 28 (10 reb), Fred House 22, Thomas 18, Frir 18, Matt Nielsen 12, Rasheed Brokenborough 11, Dalron Johnson 5, Rich 5, Kenny Anderson 4, Clemons 3, Reggie Freeman 0, Jerome Coleman 0.

- 2nd All-Star Game 2006-07:

DATE: 3 February 2007
VENUE: Kaunas Lithuania
SCORE: Baltic Stars 98 - Foreign Stars 100

Baltic Stars: Martin Muursepp 16 (10 reb), Artūras Jomantas 15, Eurelijus Žukauskas 15, Sandis Valters 14, Kullamae 11, Mantas Kalnietis 8, Tadas Klimavičius 8, Michailis Anisimov 6, Tomas Gaidamavicius 2, Raitis Grafs 2, Jonas Mačiulis 1, Darius Lukminas.

Foreign Stars: Dalron Johnson 16, Kirk Penney 13, Tanoka Beard 12 (16 reb), J. P. Batista 10, Hanno Möttölä 10, Marcelinho Machado 9, Curtis Millage 8, Joey Dorsey 8, Shannon 7, Travis Reed 5, Justin Love 2, A. J. Bramlett.

- 3d All-Star Game 2007-08:

DATE: 2 February 2008
VENUE:
SCORE: Baltic Stars 136 - Foreign Stars 154

Baltic Stars: Sandis Valters 22, Marijonas Petravičius 20, Mantas Kalnietis 18, Mindaugas Lukauskis 18, Armands Skele 15, Eurelijus Žukauskas 8, Kristjan Kangur, Janar Talts, Tanel Tein, Valmo Kriisa, Andrejs Jansons. Coach: Rimantas Grigas (Zalgiris). Ass: Ainars Bagatskis (SK Valmiera)

Foreign Stars: Vladimir Stimac 25, Mateo Kedzo 23, Dwayne Broyles 20, Marko Popović 15, Chuck Eidson 14, Akinlolu Akinbala 14, Brian Cusworth, George Tsintsadze, Hollis Price, Curtis Millage. Coach: Aleksandar Trifunovic (Lietuvos Rytas). Ass: Veselin Matic (Kalev/Cramo)

== Players with most appearances ==
Player	All-Star	Editions	Notes
(Lithuania) Eurelijus Žukauskas	2	2007, 2008	
(Lithuania) Mantas Kalnietis	2	2007, 2008	1x Slam-dunk winner
(Latvia) Sandis Valters	2	2007, 2008	
(United States) Tanoka Beard	2	2006, 2007	1x MVP
(United States) Curtis Millage	2	2007, 2008	
(United States) Dalron Johnson	2	2006, 2007	

== See also ==
- Baltic Basketball League
- Adriatic Basketball Association All-Star Game
