= Craig Callahan =

American basketball player (born 1981)

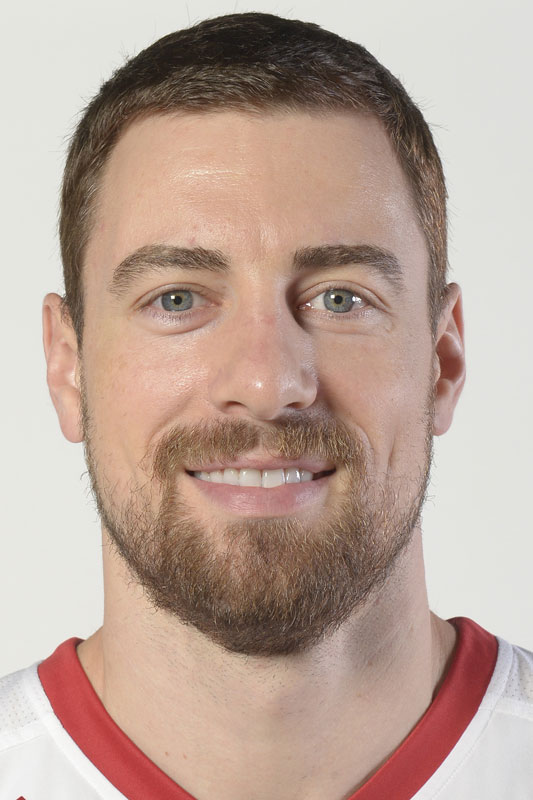

Personal information
- Born: May 26, 1981 (age 45) Maquoketa, Iowa, U.S.
- Listed height: 6 ft 8 in (2.03 m)
- Listed weight: 230 lb (104 kg)

Career information
- High school: Cascade (Cascade, Iowa)
- College: UNC Wilmington (1999–2003)
- NBA draft: 2003: undrafted
- Playing career: 2003–2017
- Position: Power forward

Career history
- 2003: Wilmington Wave Rockers
- 2003–2004: Mlékárna Kunín
- 2004–2006: BK Prostějov
- 2006–2008: Ricoh Manresa
- 2008–2009: Eisbären Bremerhaven
- 2009: Dexia Mons-Hainaut
- 2010–2011: Eisbären Bremerhaven
- 2011–2012: Enel Brindisi
- 2012–2013: Sigma Barcellona
- 2013–2014: Tezenis Verona
- 2014–2015: Pallacanestro Varese
- 2015–2016: Virtus Roma
- 2016–2017: Pallacanestro Cantù

Craig Callahan (born May 26, 1981) is an American-born naturalized Italian former professional basketball player who last played for Pallacanestro Cantù of the Lega Basket Serie A.

== Biography ==
=== Early life and education ===
Craig Nicholas Callahan was born in Maquoketa, Iowa on May 26, 1981. He graduated from Cascade High School in Cascade, Iowa. Craig attended college at the University of North Carolina Wilmington where he played on the men's basketball team. In 2011, he has got the Italian passport as naturalized.

=== Career ===
He played at the University of North Carolina Wilmington from 1999 to 2003. Callahan gained notoriety during his time at UNCW as he helped lead the team into 3 NCAA Tournaments (1999, 2002, 2003). During his senior year with the Seahawks, he averaged over 16 points and 6 rebounds a game.

After graduating from college with a Finance Degree, he played professional basketball in the Czech Republic from 2003 to 2006, and was named Most Valuable Player of the NBL in 2006. He played in the NBL All-Stars game in 2004, 2005, and 2006 in which he won the slam dunk contest. Throughout his time in Czech Republic, Callahan was recognized for numerous league achievements. Some of his achievements include Eurobasket.com All-Czech Republic League Import Player of the Year (2004, 2006), Eurobasket.com All-Czech Republic League Player of the Year (2006), Eurobasket.com All-Czech Republic League Forward of the Year (2006), and Eurobasket.com Czech Republic League All-Defensive Team (2006).

He then played in Spain from 2006 to 2008 after being signed by Ricoh Manresa.While playing for Ricoh Manresa., he contributed to the team's success when they won the LEB Championship in 2007. Due to their success in 2007, Ricoh Manresa. gained entry back into the Liga ACB in 2008.

In November 2008, Callahan was signed by the Eisbaren Bremerhaven (the Bremerhaven Polar Bears) of Germany's top league. A vital addition to the team, Callahan was one of the league's top scorers averaging over 17 points, and 6.9 rebounds a game.

During the summer of 2011 he signed a contract with New Basket Brindisi, basketball team which play the second Italian national league. Next season he played with Sigma Barcellona. In August 2013, he signed with Tezenis Verona.

In July 2014, he signed a one-year deal with Pallacanestro Varese. In 2015–16 he played for Virtus Roma, and in August 2016, he signed with Pallacanestro Cantù.

During the off-season he resides in Jacksonville, Florida.
