= Corey Muirhead =

Canadian basketball player

Corey Muirhead (June 23, 1983 in St. James, Jamaica) is a Canadian professional basketball player, currently playing for BK Pardubice in the Mattoni NBL in the Czech Republic. He previously played for Cholet Basket in 2007 and the Western Carolina Catamounts men's basketball team from 2002 to 2006. Muirhead attended Milliken Mills High School in Markham, Ontario, Canada.
