= Hall of Fame Game =

Hall of Fame Game may refer to one of the following games:

- Hall of Fame Game (baseball)
- Hall of Fame Game (hockey)
- Major League Soccer Hall of Fame Game
- Pro Football Hall of Fame Game

== See also ==
- Outback Bowl, an American college football bowl game in Tampa, Florida, called the Hall of Fame Bowl 1986–1994.
- All-American Bowl, a former American college football bowl game in Birmingham, Alabama, called the Hall of Fame Classic 1977–1985.
