= Petr Benda =

Czech basketball player (born 1982)

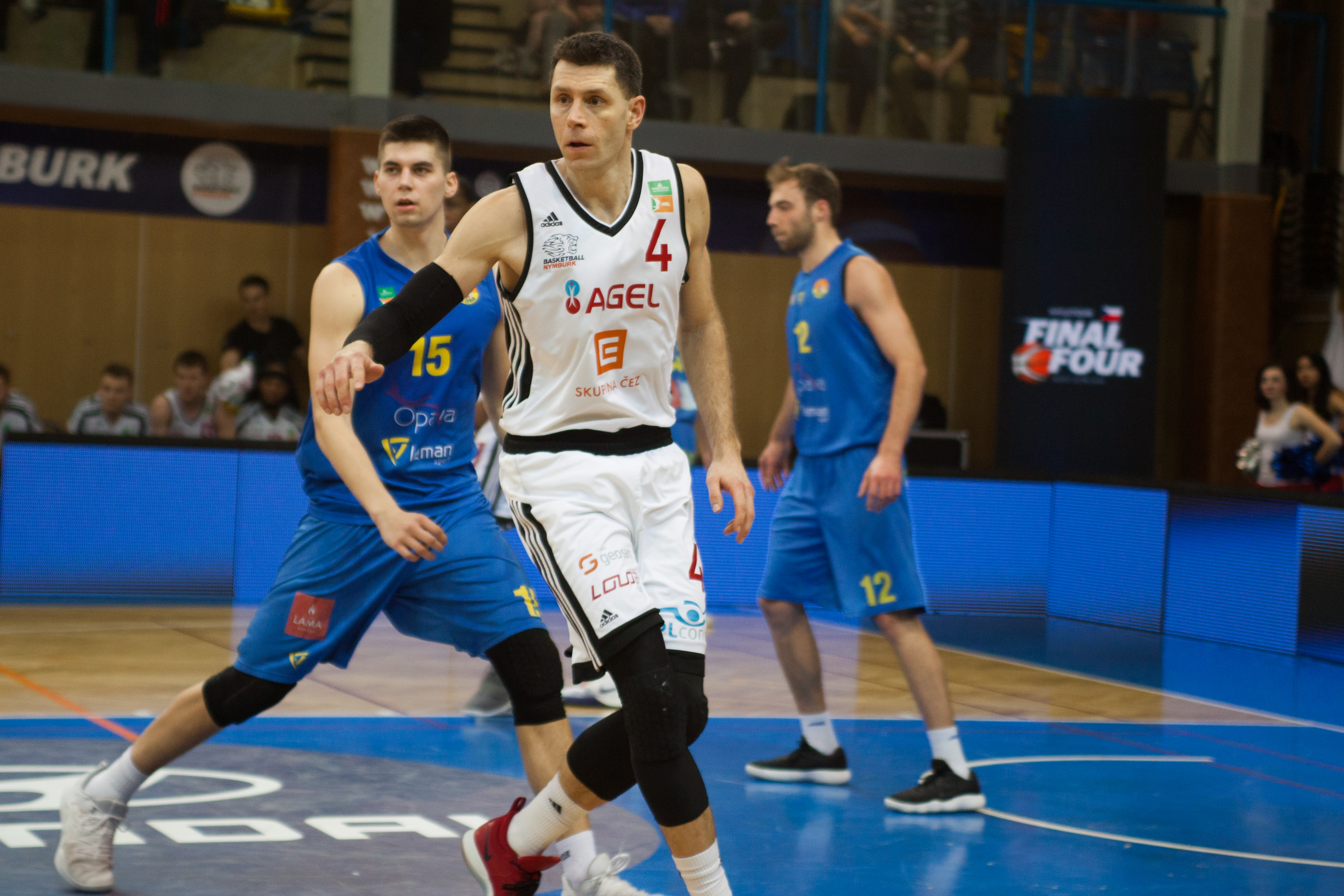
- Benda (in white) with ČEZ Nymburk in 2017.

No. 4 – ERA Nymburk
- Position: Power forward / center
- League: NBL

Personal information
- Born: March 25, 1982 (age 44) Jihlava, Czechoslovakia
- Listed height: 6 ft 8.5 in (2.04 m)
- Listed weight: 220 lb (100 kg)

Career information
- NBA draft: 2004: undrafted
- Playing career: 2000–present

Career history
- 2000–2001: Jihlava
- 2001–2007: Brno
- 2007–present: Nymburk

Career highlights
- 15× Czech League champion (2008–2022); 12× Czech Cup winner (2008–2014, 2017–2021)

Petr Benda (born March 25, 1982) is a Czech professional basketball player, who currently plays for Basketball Nymburk. He also represented the senior Czech Republic national team. Benda plays at the power forward and center positions.

== Professional career ==
Benda started his pro career in 2000–01, with BK Jihlava. For the following season, he signed with BVV Brno, where he played until 2007. Then, he signed with the Czech powerhouse Basketball Nymburk, which he would also play with in the EuroCup.

== National team career ==
Benda was a member of the senior Czech national team. He represented the Czech Republic at the following tournaments: the 2007 EuroBasket, the 2013 EuroBasket, the 2015 EuroBasket, and the 2016 Belgrade FIBA World Olympic Qualifying Tournament.

== Czech national team stats ==
Tournament	GP	PPG	RPG	APG
2007 EuroBasket	3	13.0	5.2	1.0
2013 EuroBasket	5	4.8	3.0	0.2
