= Pavel Houška =

Czech basketball player

No. 10 – ČEZ Nymburk
- Position: Power forward
- League: NBL

Personal information
- Born: 23 January 1984 (age 42) Ústí nad Labem, Czechoslovakia
- Listed height: 2.03 m (6 ft 8 in)

Pavel Houška (born 23 January 1984) is a Czech basketball player for ČEZ Nymburk and the Czech national team, where he participated at the EuroBasket 2015.
