= Robert Troha =

Croatian basketball player

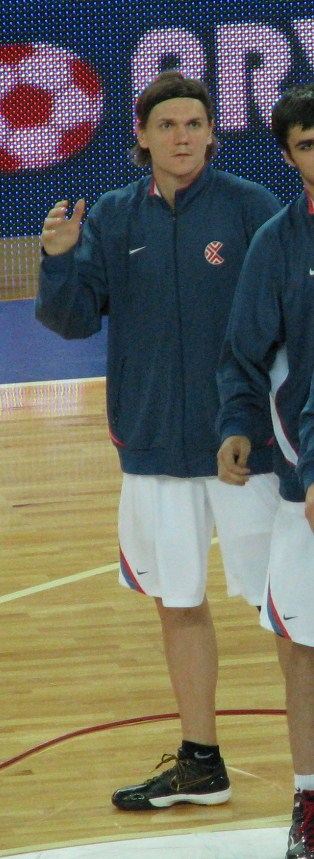

Personal information
- Born: 28 June 1977 (age 49) Zagreb, SR Croatia, SFR Yugoslavia
- Listed height: 6 ft 4.5 in (1.94 m)
- Listed weight: 216 lb (98 kg)

Career information
- Playing career: 1997–2011
- Position: Small forward / shooting guard

Career history
- 1997–1999: Gorica
- 1999–2001: Zrinjevac
- 2001–2002: Helios Domžale
- 2002–2004: Hermes Analitica
- 2004–2006: Pivovarna Laško
- 2006–2008: Helios Domžale
- 2008–2010: Cibona
- 2010–2011: Cedevita

Career highlights
- 2× Croatian League champion (2009, 2010); Slovenian League champion (2007); Slovenian Cup champion (2007); Krešimir Ćosić Cup champion (2009); 4× ABA League All-Star (2002, 2005, 2007, 2008); 4× Slovenian League All-Star (2002, 2005, 2007, 2008)

Robert Troha (born 28 June 1977) is a retired Croatian professional basketball player. Known for his shooting skills, Troha was forced to retire in 2011 due to serious knee problems.
