= Pavel Staněk =

Pavel Staněk (3 June 1927 – 5 March 2025) was a Czech conductor and composer. He was chief conductor of the Czech Radio Orchestra in Ostrava from 1963 to 1990.

== Life and career ==
Staněk was born in Prague on 3 June 1927. He studied double bass at the Prague Conservatory from 1946 to 1951. He was first a double bassist, later a choral conductor of the National Ensemble for Dance and Song from 1950 to 1954. He then moved to the music corps of the Ministry of the Interior, where he led a large brass band for about six years. He was conductor at the Na Fidlovačce operetta theatre in Prague from 1961 to 1963. He led choir and orchestra of the ČKD company simultaneously.

In 1963 Staněk became chief conductor of the Czech Radio Orchestra in Ostrava, a position that he held until retirement in 1990. He also conducted other orchestras as a guest, including brass bands in Krnov, Jeseník and Kopřivnice, and also the Radio Brass Band of Leipzig.

As a composer, he was influenced by Bohemian and Moravian folklore and also contemporary experimental music and the music of earlier periods.

Staněk died in Ostrava on 5 March 2025.
