= Jimmie Hunt =

American basketball player

No. 5 – BC Kolín
- Position: Point guard
- League: NBL

Personal information
- Born: September 14, 1982 (age 44) Utica, New York
- Listed height: 6 ft 2 in (1.88 m)
- Listed weight: 200 lb (91 kg)

Career information
- High school: Mt. Ararat (Topsham, Maine)
- College: Franklin Pierce (2000–2004)
- NBA draft: 2004: undrafted
- Playing career: 2005–present

Career history
- 2005–2007: Šentjur
- 2007: Snaidero Basketball
- 2007–2008: Skyliners Frankfurt
- 2008: →MKS Polonia Warsaw
- 2009–2010: Cherno More Port Varna
- 2009: →BC Yambol
- 2010: BC Balkan
- 2011: Florida Flight
- 2012: Cherno More Port Varna
- 2012–2013: BC Balkan
- 2015: BC Levski Sofia
- 2015–present: BC Kolín

Jimmie Hunt (born September 14, 1982) is an American professional basketball player who currently plays for Sportist Svoge of the National Basketball League (Bulgaria). He played college basketball for Franklin Pierce University.

== Professional career ==
After going undrafted in the 2004 NBA draft, Hunt signed with Tajfun of the Telemach League for the 2005–2006 season.

In June 2007 signed a 3-year contract with Skyliners Frankfurt.

On 3 February 2015, Hunt has signed with BC Levski Sofia.
