= Maryland Crab Bowl =

Annual high school football all-star game

The Maryland Crab Bowl is an annual Middle school and high school postseason all-star game that features some of the most outstanding players in the state of Maryland. The game is played at McDaniel College, between a team composed of players from Washington, D.C. area schools (the "Washington" squad) and one of players from Baltimore and elsewhere in the state (the "Baltimore" squad). As an all-star game, it provides high-school players with an additional opportunity to impress college football scouts and may increase their chances of being awarded a university athletic scholarship. The Washington team draws from schools in Montgomery County, Prince George's County, and the Southern Maryland Athletic Conference, which includes schools in Calvert, Charles, and St. Mary's counties. The Baltimore team draws from schools located elsewhere in the state, primarily in the Baltimore metropolitan area.

The inaugural game was held on December 20, 2008, at Johnny Unitas Memorial Stadium at Towson University. In that game, Washington defeated Baltimore, 32–21. Nine players who had committed to attend the University of Maryland, College Park, and play for the Maryland Terrapins, participated. That game also featured the most highly recruited player in the area, linebacker Jelani Jenkins, who later committed to the University of Florida. Washington's running back Caleb Porzel, a Maryland commit, and Baltimore's running back Tavon Austin, who later committed to West Virginia, were named the most valuable players. The Maryland Crab Bowl was originally envisioned as a game to be held in conjunction with the inaugural EagleBank Bowl, which was played on the same date at RFK Stadium in Washington, D.C. The 2009 edition of the Maryland Crab Bowl was also played at Towson University.
