= Maurice Whitfield =

American-born Czech basketball player

Personal information
- Born: March 29, 1973 (age 53) Philadelphia, Pennsylvania
- Listed height: 6 ft 1 in (1.85 m)

Career information
- High school: Dobbins Tech (Philadelphia, Pennsylvania)
- College: Norfolk State (1994–1997)
- NBA draft: 1997: undrafted
- Playing career: 1997–2012
- Position: Point guard

Career history
- 1997–1998: Dominican Republic
- 1998–1999: Bolivia
- 1999: Billings RimRockers
- 2000–2001: Sava Osiguranje Rijeka
- 2001–2002: Mlékárna Kunín
- 2002–2006: Nymburk
- 2006–2007: PBC Ural Great
- 2007–2008: Olympias Patras
- 2008: Akasvayu Girona
- 2009–2012: Lleida Bàsquet

Career highlights
- 3x Czech League champion (2004–2006); 2x Czech Cup champion (2002, 2005)

Maurice Lamar Whitfield (born March 29, 1973) is a former American-born Czech professional basketball player. He played at the point guard position.

== Professional career ==
Whitfield played several seasons in Nymburk, leading the team to the Czech Championship. He played for Ural Great Perm of the Russian Super League. In the 2007–08 season, he played in Greece for Olympias Patras.

In January 2008, he signed with Akasvayu Girona of Spain for the rest of the 2007–08 season. From 2009 to 2012 he played with Lleida Bàsquet, where he finished his career.

== Czech national team ==
Whitfield played for the Czech Republic national basketball team at the FIBA EuroBasket 2007 in Spain.
