= 2010–11 Turkish Basketball League =

- League: Turkish Basketball League
- Sport: Basketball
- Games: 240 (regular season)
- Teams: 16
- Total attendance: 424,041
- Average attendance: 1,606
- TV partner: Lig TV

Regular Season
- Season champions: Fenerbahçe Ülker
- Top scorer: (United States) (Turkey) Ali Karadeniz (Medical Park Trabzonspor)

TBL Finals
- Champions: Fenerbahçe Ülker
- Runners-up: Galatasaray Café Crown
- Finals MVP: (Turkey) Oğuz Savaş

TBL seasons
- ← 2009–10 2011–12 →

The 2010–11 Turkish Basketball League was the 45th season of the top professional basketball league in Turkey. In the 2010–2011 season Fenerbahçe Ülker had won the Turkish Basketball League .

== Clubs and arenas ==
The league consists of the following member clubs:

| Club | City | Founded | Arena | Capacity | Titles | Last season |
|---|---|---|---|---|---|---|
| Aliağa Petkim | İzmir | 1963 | Enka Sport Hall | 2,500 | -- | 13th(RS) |
| Antalya BŞB | Antalya | 1995 | Dilek Sabancı Sport Hall | 2,500 | -- | 11th(RS) |
| Bandırma Banvit | Balıkesir | 1994 | Kara Ali Acar Sport Hall | 2,500 | -- | 3rd(RS), SF(Play-off) |
| Bornova Belediye | İzmir | 1986 | Halkapınar Sport Hall | 10,000 | -- | 7th(RS), QF(Play-off) |
| Beşiktaş Cola Turka | Istanbul | 1903 | BJK Akatlar Arena | 3,500 | 1 | 4th(RS), SF(Play-off) |
| Efes Pilsen | Istanbul | 1976 | Sinan Erdem Dome | 16,500 | 13 | 1st(RS), RU(Play-off) |
| Erdemirspor | Zonguldak | 1966 | Erdemir Sport Hall | 2,250 | -- | 8th(RS), QF(Play-off) |
| Fenerbahçe Ülker | Istanbul | 1913 | Sinan Erdem Dome | 16,500 | 4 | 2nd(RS), Winner(Play-off) |
| Galatasaray Café Crown | Istanbul | 1905 | Abdi İpekçi Arena | 12,500 | 4 | 9th(RS) |
| Medical Park Trabzonspor | Trabzon | 2008 | Hayri Gür Spor Salonu | 7,500 | -- | Winner (TB2L) |
| Mersin Büyükşehir Belediyespor | Mersin | 1993 | Edip Buran Sport Hall | 2,500 | -- | 12th(RS) |
| Olin Edirne | Edirne | 2006 | Mimar Sinan Sport Hall | 2,100 | -- | 2nd (TB2L) |
| Oyak Renault | Bursa | 1974 | Bursa Atatürk Sport Hall | 2,900 | -- | 14th(RS) |
| Pınar Karşıyaka | İzmir | 1966 | Karşıyaka Pınar Arena | 5,000 | 1 | 6th(RS), QF(Play-off) |
| Tofaş | Bursa | 1974 | Bursa Atatürk Sport Hall | 2,900 | 2 | 10th(RS) |
| Türk Telekom | Ankara | 1980 | Ankara Atatürk Sport Hall | 4,550 | -- | 5th(RS), QF(Play-off) |

RS = Regular season / QF = Quarter-finals / SF = Semi-finals / RU = Runners-up

=== League table ===
| Pos | Team | Pld | W | L | PF | PA | PD | Pts | Qualification or relegation |
|---|---|---|---|---|---|---|---|---|---|
| 1 | Fenerbahçe Ülker | 30 | 27 | 3 | 2523 | 2188 | +335 | 57 | Qualification to playoffs |
| 2 | Banvit | 30 | 23 | 7 | 2383 | 2161 | +222 | 53 | Qualification to playoffs |
| 3 | Galatasaray Cafe Crown | 30 | 22 | 8 | 2381 | 2078 | +303 | 52 | Qualification to playoffs |
| 4 | Efes Pilsen | 30 | 22 | 8 | 2493 | 2106 | +387 | 52 | Qualification to playoffs |
| 5 | Pınar Karşıyaka | 30 | 21 | 9 | 2555 | 2357 | +198 | 51 | Qualification to playoffs |
| 6 | Beşiktaş Cola Turka | 30 | 19 | 11 | 2515 | 2380 | +135 | 49 | Qualification to playoffs |
| 7 | Olin Edirne | 30 | 17 | 13 | 2225 | 2155 | +70 | 47 | Qualification to playoffs |
| 8 | Antalya BB | 30 | 14 | 16 | 2308 | 2391 | −83 | 44 | Qualification to playoffs |
| 9 | Tofaş | 30 | 13 | 17 | 2190 | 2247 | −57 | 43 | |
| 10 | Türk Telekom | 30 | 12 | 18 | 2326 | 2425 | −99 | 42 | |
| 11 | Medical Park Trabzonspor | 30 | 10 | 20 | 2315 | 2506 | −191 | 40 | |
| 12 | Erdemirspor | 30 | 10 | 20 | 2293 | 2382 | −89 | 40 | |
| 13 | Mersin BB | 30 | 10 | 20 | 2243 | 2326 | −83 | 40 | |
| 14 | Aliağa Petkim | 30 | 9 | 21 | 2268 | 2615 | −347 | 39 | |
| 15 | Bornova Belediye (R) | 30 | 8 | 22 | 2198 | 2461 | −263 | 38 | Relegation to TBL |
| 16 | Oyak Renault (R) | 30 | 3 | 27 | 2065 | 2503 | −438 | 33 | Relegation to TBL |

Source: TBL
(R) Relegated

== Playoffs ==
Quarter Finals
1 | Fenerbahçe Ülker | 3
8 | Antalya BB | 0
4 | Efes Pilsen | 3
5 | Pınar Karşıyaka | 0
2 | Banvit | 3
7 | Olin Edirne | 2
3 | Galatasaray Café Crown | 3
6 | Beşiktaş Cola Turka | 0

SemiFinals
1 | Fenerbahçe Ülker | 3
4 | Efes Pilsen | 0
2 | Banvit | 1
3 | Galatasaray Café Crown | 3

Finals
1 | Fenerbahçe Ülker | 4
3 | Galatasaray Café Crown | 2
