= 2011 TBL Playoffs =

TBL Playoffs
- Season: 2010–11
- Dates: 11 May – 17 June 2011
- Games played: 24
- Teams: 8

Finals
- Champions: Fenerbahçe Ülker (5th title)
- Runners-up: Galatasaray Cafe Crown
- Semifinalists: Banvit; Efes Pilsen
- Finals MVP: (Turkey) Oğuz Savaş
- All statistics correct as of 16 May 2019.

2011 Turkish Basketball League (TBL) Playoffs was the final phase of the 2010–11 Turkish Basketball League season. The playoffs started on 11 May 2011. Fenerbahçe Ülker were the defending champions.

The eight highest placed teams of the regular season qualified for the playoffs. All series were best-of-5 except the final, which was best-of-7. Under Turkish league rules, if a team swept its playoff opponent in the regular season, it was granted an automatic 1–0 series lead, and the series started with Game 2.

Fenerbahçe Ülker competed against Galatasaray Café Crown in the finals, won the series 4–2 and got their 5th championship.

== Bracket ==
Quarter Finals
1	Fenerbahçe Ülker	3
8	Antalya BB	0
4	Efes Pilsen	3
5	Pınar Karşıyaka	0
2	Banvit	3
7	Olin Edirne	2
3	Galatasaray Café Crown	3
6	Beşiktaş Cola Turka	0

SemiFinals
1	Fenerbahçe Ülker	3
4	Efes Pilsen	0
2	Banvit	1
3	Galatasaray Café Crown	3

Finals
1	Fenerbahçe Ülker	4
3	Galatasaray Café Crown	2

== Quarterfinals ==
=== Fenerbahçe Ülker vs. Antalya BB ===
May 11, 2011
20:45 EEST

Report

Fenerbahçe Ülker	80–77	Antalya BB
Scoring by quarter: 23-22, 27-11, 15-16, 15-28
2-0

Sinan Erdem Dome, Istanbul

May 14, 2011
17:00 EEST

Report

Antalya BB	79–90	Fenerbahçe Ülker
Scoring by quarter: 20-20, 27-11, 16-12, 24-28
Fenerbahçe Ülker wins series 3-0

Antalya Atatürk Sport Hall, Antalya

=== Banvit vs. Olin Edirne ===
May 12, 2011
18:00 EEST

Report

Banvit	84–87 (OT)	Olin Edirne
Scoring by quarter: 16-19, 18-16, 23-13, 13-27, Overtime: 9-12
0-1

Banvit Kara Ali Acar Sport Hall, Bandırma

May 14, 2011
19:00 EEST

Report

Banvit	77–59	Olin Edirne
Scoring by quarter: 16-14, 25-16, 19-13, 17-16
1-1

Banvit Kara Ali Acar Sport Hall, Bandırma

May 17, 2011
18:30 EEST

Report

Olin Edirne	62–68	Banvit
Scoring by quarter: 23-15, 16-18, 13-19, 10-16
1-2

Mimar Sinan Sport Hall, Edirne

May 19, 2011
18:30 EEST

Report

Olin Edirne	81–52	Banvit
Scoring by quarter: 23-15, 17-16, 25-11, 16-10
2-2

Mimar Sinan Sport Hall, Edirne

May 22, 2011
15:00 EEST

Report

Banvit	71–60	Olin Edirne
Scoring by quarter: 22-23, 14-14, 16-8, 19-15
Banvit wins series 3-2

Banvit Kara Ali Acar Sport Hall, Bandırma

=== Efes Pilsen vs. Pınar Karşıyaka ===
May 11, 2011
18:00 EEST

Report

Efes Pilsen	90–72	Pınar Karşıyaka
Scoring by quarter: 25-13, 32-20, 20-15, 13-24
1-0

Sinan Erdem Dome, Istanbul

May 13, 2011
18:30 EEST

Report

Efes Pilsen	78–74	Pınar Karşıyaka
Scoring by quarter: 18-12, 18-19, 27-19, 15-24
2-0

Sinan Erdem Dome, Istanbul

May 16, 2011
20:30 EEST

Report

Pınar Karşıyaka	78–85	Efes Pilsen
Scoring by quarter: 28-22, 14-22, 21-17, 15-24
Efes Pilsen wins series 3-0

M.K.Atatürk Karşıyaka Sport Hall, İzmir

=== Galatasaray Café Crown vs. Beşiktaş Cola Turka ===
May 12, 2011
20:00 EEST

Report

Galatasaray Café Crown	94–90 (OT)	Beşiktaş Cola Turka
Scoring by quarter: 21-18, 22-21, 17-25, 20-16, Overtime: 14-10
2-0

Abdi İpekçi Arena, Istanbul

May 15, 2011
15:00 EEST

Report

Beşiktaş Cola Turka	70–80	Galatasaray Café Crown
Scoring by quarter: 16-16, 22-15, 18-21, 20-16
Galatasaray Café Crown wins series 3-0

Akatlar Arena, Istanbul

== Semifinals ==
=== Fenerbahçe Ülker vs. Efes Pilsen ===
May 24, 2011
20:30 EEST

Report

Fenerbahçe Ülker	79–70	Efes Pilsen
Scoring by quarter: 18-19, 19-16, 18-17, 24-18
2-0

Sinan Erdem Dome, Istanbul

May 27, 2011
20:30 EEST

Report

Efes Pilsen	82–87	Fenerbahçe Ülker
Scoring by quarter: 26-27, 17-26, 17-19, 22-15
Fenerbahçe Ülker wins series 3-0

Sinan Erdem Dome, Istanbul

=== Banvit vs. Galatasaray Café Crown ===
May 25, 2011
20:00 EEST

Report

Banvit	57–79	Galatasaray Café Crown
Scoring by quarter: 17-15, 15-25, 14-21, 11-18
0-1

Banvit Kara Ali Acar Sport Hall, Bandırma

May 27, 2011
18:00 EEST

Report

Banvit	85–74	Galatasaray Café Crown
Scoring by quarter: 19-20, 23-21, 31-14, 12-19
1-1

Banvit Kara Ali Acar Sport Hall, Bandırma

May 30, 2011
20:00 EEST

Report

Galatasaray Café Crown	73–61	Banvit
Scoring by quarter: 27-15, 15-18, 11-14, 20-14
2-1

Abdi İpekçi Arena, Istanbul

June 1, 2011
20:00 EEST

Report

Galatasaray Café Crown	89–55	Banvit
Scoring by quarter: 30-14, 23-5, 22-20, 14-16
Galatasaray Café Crown wins series 3-1

Abdi İpekçi Arena, Istanbul

== Finals ==
=== Fenerbahçe Ülker vs. Galatasaray Café Crown ===
June 4, 2011
19:00 EEST

Report

Fenerbahçe Ülker	81–59	Galatasaray Café Crown
Scoring by quarter: 21-16, 23-17, 23-16, 14-10
1-0

Sinan Erdem Dome, Istanbul

June 6, 2011
20:00 EEST

Report

Fenerbahçe Ülker	95–74	Galatasaray Café Crown
Scoring by quarter: 26-20, 18-26, 29-17, 22-11
2-0

Sinan Erdem Dome, Istanbul

June 9, 2011
20:00 EEST

Report

Galatasaray Café Crown	97–93 (OT)	Fenerbahçe Ülker
Scoring by quarter: 23-21, 27-24, 22-22, 12-17, Overtime: 13-9
2-1

Abdi İpekçi Arena, Istanbul

June 11, 2011
19:00 EEST

Report

Galatasaray Café Crown	74–85	Fenerbahçe Ülker
Scoring by quarter: 17-23, 19-14, 13-27, 25-21
1-3

Abdi İpekçi Arena, Istanbul

June 14, 2011
20:00 EEST

Report

Fenerbahçe Ülker	71–72	Galatasaray Café Crown
Scoring by quarter: 24-19, 17-22, 12-15, 18-16
3-2

Sinan Erdem Dome, Istanbul

June 17, 2011
20:00 EEST

Report

Galatasaray Café Crown	88–91	Fenerbahçe Ülker
Scoring by quarter: 23-21, 26-28, 17-20, 22-22
Fenerbahçe Ülker wins series 4-2

Abdi İpekçi Arena, Istanbul

2011 TBL Champions
Fenerbahçe Ülker
5th Title
