= 2008–09 Turkish Basketball League =

2008-09 Turkish Basketball League
- League: Turkish Basketball League
- Sport: Basketball
- Games: 240 (regular season)
- Teams: 16
- Total attendance: 479,650
- Average attendance: 1,831
- TV partner: Lig TV

Regular Season

TBL Finals
- Finals MVP: (United States) Bootsy Thornton

TBL seasons
- ← 2007–08 2009–10 →

The 2008–09 Turkish Basketball League was the 43rd season of the top professional basketball league in Turkey. Efes Pilsen won the championship.

== Regular season standings ==
Statistics correct as of June 19, 2009

Clinches Play-off berth
Eliminated from the Play-offs
Relegated

Pos	Club	Pld	W	L	PF	PA	Pts
1	Efes Pilsen	30	28	2	2615	2156	58
2	Türk Telekom	30	22	8	2489	2319	52
3	Fenerbahçe Ülker	30	22	8	2556	2124	52
4	Galatasaray Cafe Crown	30	20	10	2321	2196	50
5	Beşiktaş Cola Turka	30	18	12	2485	2388	48
6	Antalya BB	30	17	13	2466	2529	47
7	Mersin BB	30	15	15	2496	2425	45
8	Darüşşafaka Cooper Tires	30	14	16	2239	2319	44
9	Pınar Karşıyaka	30	13	17	2324	2440	43
10	Oyak Renault	30	13	17	2268	2308	43
11	Erdemirspor	30	12	18	2178	2269	42
12	Banvitspor	30	12	18	2536	2626	42
13	Kepez Belediyesi	30	11	19	2289	2477	41
14	Aliağa Petkim	30	10	20	2321	2459	40
15	Mutlu Akü Selçuk Üniversitesi	30	10	20	2303	2517	40
16	CASA TED Kolejliler	30	3	27	2058	2392	33

== Clubs and Arenas ==
The league consists of the following member clubs:

Clubs 2008-2009 Season
Club	City	Foun.Year	Arena	Capacity	Nr.Ch.	Last Year
Aliağa Belediyesispor	İzmir	??	Enka Sport Hall	2,500	--	2nd (TB2L)
Antalya BŞB	Antalya	1995	Dilek Sabancı Sport Hall	2,500	--	6th(RS), QF(Play-off)
Bandırma Banvit	Balıkesir	1994	Kara Ali Acar Sport Hall	2,500	--	8th(RS), QF(Play-off)
Beşiktaş Cola Turka	Istanbul	1903	BJK Akatlar Arena	3,500	1	1st(RS), SF(Play-off)
CASA TED Kolejliler	Ankara	1954	TOBB Sport Hall	1,700	--	9th(RS)
Darüşşafaka	Istanbul	1914	Ayhan Sahenk Sport Hall	3,500	--	14th(RS)
Efes Pilsen	Istanbul	1976	Ayhan Sahenk Sport Hall	3,500	12	2nd(RS), SF(Play-off)
Erdemirspor	Zonguldak	??	Erdemir Sport Hall	2,250	--	Winner (TB2L)
Fenerbahçe Ülker	Istanbul	1913	Abdi İpekçi Arena	12,500	3	3rd(RS), Winner(Play-off)
Galatasaray Café Crown	Istanbul	1905	Ayhan Sahenk Sport Hall	3,500	4	5th(RS), QF(Play-off)
Kepez Belediyesi	Antalya	1995	Dilek Sabancı Sport Hall	2,500	--	11th(RS)
Mersin Büyükşehir Belediyespor	Mersin	??	Edip Buran Sport Hall	2,500	--	10th(RS)
Mutlu Akü Selçuk Üniversitesi	Konya	1987	Selçuk Üniversity 19 Mayıs Sport Hall	3,500	--	13th(RS)
Oyak Renault	Bursa	1974	Bursa Atatürk Sport Hall	2,900	--	12th(RS)
Pınar Karşıyaka	İzmir	1912	Karşıyaka Pınar Arena	5,000	1	7th(RS), QF(Play-off)
Türk Telekom	Ankara	1980	Ankara Atatürk Sport Hall	4,550	--	4th(RS), RU(Play-off)

== Playoffs ==
Quarter Finals
1	Efes Pilsen	3
8	Darüşşafaka	0
4	Galatasaray Cafe Crown	3
5	Beşiktaş Cola Turka	0
2	Türk Telekom	3
7	Mersin BB	1
3	Fenerbahçe Ülker	3
6	Antalya BB	0

SemiFinals
1	Efes Pilsen	3
4	Galatasaray Cafe Crown	0
2	Türk Telekom	2
3	Fenerbahçe Ülker	3

Finals
1	Efes Pilsen	4
3	Fenerbahçe Ülker	2
