= 2012 TBL Playoffs =

TBL Playoffs
- Season: 2011–12
- Dates: 5 May – 11 June 2012
- Games played: 23
- Teams: 8

Finals
- Champions: Beşiktaş Milangaz (2nd title)
- Runners-up: Anadolu Efes
- Semifinalists: Banvit; Galatasaray Medical Park
- Finals MVP: (Puerto Rico) Carlos Arroyo
- All statistics correct as of 16 May 2019.

2012 TBL Playoffs was the final phase of the 2011–12 Turkish Basketball League. The playoffs started on 5 April 2012. Fenerbahçe Ülker were the defending champions.

The eight highest placed teams of the regular season qualified for the playoffs. In the quarter-finals a best-of-three was played, in the semi-finals a best-of-five and in the finals a best-of-seven playoff format was used.

Beşiktaş Milangaz competed against Anadolu Efes in the finals, won the series 4–2 and got their 2nd championship.

== Bracket ==
Quarterfinals
1	Galatasaray Medical Park	2
8	Tofaş	0
4	Beşiktaş Milangaz	2
5	Fenerbahçe Ülker	0
2	Banvit	2
7	Aliağa Petkim	0
3	Anadolu Efes	2
6	Pınar Karşıyaka	0

Semifinals
1	Galatasaray Medical Park	1
4	Beşiktaş Milangaz	3
2	Banvit	2
3	Anadolu Efes	3

Finals
4	Beşiktaş Milangaz	4
3	Anadolu Efes	2

== Quarterfinals ==
=== Galatasaray Medical Park vs. Tofaş ===
May 5, 2012
20:00 EEST

Report

Galatasaray Medical Park	80–66	Tofaş
Scoring by quarter: 15-18, 30-17, 16-10, 19-21
Pts: Andrić 16; Rebs: Andrić, Aldemir 5 Asts: Açık 4		Pts: Ružić 13; Rebs: Buckman 7 Asts: Koç 5
1-0

Abdi İpekçi Arena, Istanbul
Referees: Fatih Söylemezoğlu (TUR), Özlem Yalman (TUR), Halil Baldemir (TUR)

May 8, 2012
20:30 EEST

Report

Tofaş	73–79	Galatasaray Medical Park
Scoring by quarter: 24-29, 22-11, 21-19, 6-20
Pts: Žuža 19; Rebs: Žuža 5 Asts: Žuža, Altıntığ 4		Pts: Đedović 15; Rebs: Andrić 7 Asts: Đedović, Açık 3
Galatasaray Medical Park wins series 2-0

Bursa Atatürk Sport Hall, Bursa
Referees: Erşan Kartal (TUR), Erman Erdemli (TUR), Ahmet Ersan Ergüler (TUR)

=== Beşiktaş Milangaz vs. Fenerbahçe Ülker ===
May 6, 2012
15:00 EEST

Report

Beşiktaş Milangaz	96–94	Fenerbahçe Ülker
Scoring by quarter: 25-25, 17-20, 17-15, 22-21
Pts: Hawkins, Mensah-Bonsu 24; Rebs: Mensah-Bonsu 11; Asts: Arroyo, Hawkins 4		Pts: Onan 24; Rebs: Peker 6 Asts: Preldžič 6
1-0

Beşiktaş Milangaz Arena, Istanbul
Referees: Recep Ankaralı (TUR), Zafer Yılmaz (TUR), Fatih Arslanoğlu (TUR)

May 9, 2012
20:30 EEST

Report

Fenerbahçe Ülker	74–77	Beşiktaş Milangaz
Scoring by quarter: 20-21, 23-15, 9-18, 22-23
Pts: Bogdanović 22; Rebs: Peker 8 Asts: Ukić, Onan 3		Pts: Hawkins 21; Rebs: Mensah-Bonsu 8 Asts: Hawkins 4
Beşiktaş Milangaz wins series 2-0

Ülker Sports Arena, Istanbul
Referees: Rüştü Nuran (TUR), Ahmet Ersan Ergüler (TUR), Ali Şakacı (TUR)

=== Banvit vs. Aliağa Petkim ===
May 5, 2012
17:30 EEST

Report

Banvit	85–66	Aliağa Petkim
Scoring by quarter: 17-18, 19-18, 22-17, 27-13
Pts: Davis 20; Rebs: Davis, Bajramović 6 Asts: Ermiş 6		Pts: Plaisted 18; Rebs: Plaisted 10; Asts: Ratkovica 6
1-0

Kara Ali Acar Sport Hall, Bandırma
Referees: Aytuğ Ekti (TUR), Kaan Büyükçil (TUR), Semih Vural (TUR)

May 8, 2012
18:30 EEST

Report

Aliağa Petkim	64–80	Banvit
Scoring by quarter: 21-19, 16-22, 14-23, 13-16
Pts: Toolson 13; Rebs: Görkem 10; Asts: Ratkovica 4		Pts: Davis 19; Rebs: Davis 5 Asts: Ermiş 6
Banvit wins series 2-0

Enka Sport Hall, İzmir
Referees: Mehmet Keseratar (TUR), Ziya Özorhon (TUR), Ahmet Tatlıcı (TUR)

=== Anadolu Efes vs. Pınar Karşıyaka ===
May 6, 2012
20:00 EEST

Report

Anadolu Efes	98–79	Pınar Karşıyaka
Scoring by quarter: 26-28, 35-14, 21-17, 16-20
Pts: Vujačić 17; Rebs: Three Players 5 Asts: Lafayette 7		Pts: Chatman; Rebs: Karaman 10; Asts: Three Players 4
1-0

Sinan Erdem Dome, Istanbul
Referees: Murat Biricik (TUR), Halil Baldemir (TUR), Alper Özgök (TUR)

May 9, 2012
18:30 EEST

Report

Pınar Karşıyaka	73–84	Anadolu Efes
Scoring by quarter: 19-20, 15-19, 19-22, 20-23
Pts: Chatman 28; Rebs: Karaman, Ikonić 4 Asts: Chatman 6		Pts: Tunçeri 19; Rebs: Savanović 8 Asts: Tunçeri 6
Anadolu Efes wins series 2-0

Karşıyaka Arena, İzmir
Referees: Emin Moğulkoç (TUR), Alper Altuğ Köselerli (TUR), Yener Yılmaz (TUR)

== Semifinals ==
=== Galatasaray Medical Park vs. Beşiktaş Milangaz ===
May 15, 2012
20:00 EEST

Report

Galatasaray Medical Park	75–74	Beşiktaş Milangaz
Scoring by quarter: 19-11, 23-17, 16-25, 17-21
Pts: Aldemir 17; Rebs: Aldemir 5 Asts: Lakovič, Açık 4		Pts: Erceg 23; Rebs: Mensah-Bonsu 9 Asts: Çetin 5
1-0

Abdi İpekçi Arena, Istanbul
Referees: Mehmet Keseratar (TUR), Erman Erdemli (TUR), Mehmet Serdar Ünal (TUR)

May 17, 2012
20:00 EEST

Report

Galatasaray Medical Park	72–81	Beşiktaş Milangaz
Scoring by quarter: 21-17, 19-22, 13-19, 19-23
Pts: Savović 17; Rebs: Aldemir 8 Asts: Gordon 4		Pts: Hawkins 24; Rebs: Dudley 13; Asts: Arroyo 6
1-1

Abdi İpekçi Arena, Istanbul
Referees: Erşan Kartal (TUR), Alper Özgök (TUR), Kaan Büyükçil (TUR)

May 20, 2012
17:00 EEST

Report

Beşiktaş Milangaz	74–65	Galatasaray Medical Park
Scoring by quarter: 19-14, 23-22, 20-15, 12-14
Pts: Hawkins 21; Rebs: Mensah-Bonsu 8 Asts: Arroyo 3		Pts: Đedović, Savović 16; Rebs: Savović 7 Asts: Arslan, Lakovič 3
2-1

Sinan Erdem Dome, Istanbul
Referees: Engin Kennerman (TUR), Halil Baldemir (TUR), Ziya Özorhon (TUR)

May 22, 2012
20:00 EEST

Report

Beşiktaş Milangaz	84–73	Galatasaray Medical Park
Scoring by quarter: 18-22, 17-19, 23-18, 26-14
Pts: Hawkins 24; Rebs: Çetin, Hawkins 6 Asts: Arroyo 5		Pts: Đedović 19; Rebs: Aldemir 10; Asts: Arslan 6
Beşiktaş Milangaz wins series 3-1

Sinan Erdem Dome, Istanbul
Referees: Murat Biricik (TUR), Zafer Yılmaz (TUR), Semih Vural (TUR)

=== Banvit vs. Anadolu Efes ===
May 16, 2012
18:00 EEST

Report

Banvit	68–66	Anadolu Efes
Scoring by quarter: 16-12, 14-18, 18-21, 20-15
Pts: Lucas 16; Rebs: Bajramović 6 Asts: Ermiş 5		Pts: Tunçeri 11; Rebs: Batista, Savanović 7 Asts: Balbay 3
1-0

Kara Ali Acar Sport Hall, Bandırma
Referees: Rüştü Nuran (TUR), Serkan Emlek (TUR), Yener Yılmaz (TUR)

May 18, 2012
19:00 EEST

Report

Banvit	75–81	Anadolu Efes
Scoring by quarter: 18-18, 22-22, 25-19, 10-22
Pts: Erdoğan 20; Rebs: Nalga 5 Asts: Ermiş 5		Pts: Tunçeri, Savanović 15; Rebs: Savanović 5 Asts: Three Players 3
1-1

Kara Ali Acar Sport Hall, Bandırma
Referees: Recep Ankaralı (TUR), Aytuğ Ekti (TUR), Ali Şakacı (TUR)

May 21, 2012
19:00 EEST

Report

Anadolu Efes	68–55	Banvit
Scoring by quarter: 17-9, 20-19, 20-12, 11-15
Pts: Akyol 19; Rebs: Güler 6 Asts: Tunçeri 5		Pts: Davis 14; Rebs: Bajramović 6 Asts: Ermiş 5
2-1

Sinan Erdem Dome, Istanbul
Referees: Mehmet Keseratar (TUR), Özlem Yalman (TUR), Fatih Arslanoğlu (TUR)

May 23, 2012
19:00 EEST

Report

Anadolu Efes	71–73	Banvit
Scoring by quarter: 21-16, 23-14, 17-19, 10-24
Pts: Akyol 17; Rebs: Kurtoğlu 8 Asts: Tunçeri 5		Pts: Davis, Bajramović 17; Rebs: Davis 9 Asts: Bajramović 5
2-2

Sinan Erdem Dome, Istanbul
Referees: Engin Kennerman (TUR), Ahmet Ersan Ergüler (TUR), Alper Altuğ Köselerli (TUR)

May 26, 2012
18:00 EEST

Report

Banvit	72–77	Anadolu Efes
Scoring by quarter: 15-19, 21-20, 19-15, 17-23
Pts: Lucas 20; Rebs: Three Players 5 Asts: Lucas 5		Pts: Gönlüm 17; Rebs: Gönlüm 9 Asts: Lafayette 3
Anadolu Efes wins series 3-2

Kara Ali Acar Sport Hall, Bandırma
Referees: Mehmet Keseratar (TUR), Murat Biricik (TUR), Kaan Büyükçil (TUR)

== Finals ==
=== Anadolu Efes vs. Beşiktaş Milangaz ===
May 29, 2012
19:00 EEST

Report

Anadolu Efes	75–82	Beşiktaş Milangaz
Scoring by quarter: 15-20, 15-16, 23-26, 22-20
Pts: Tunçeri 15; Rebs: Batista, Güler 4 Asts: Lafayette 9		Pts: Mensah-Bonsu 18; Rebs: Dudley 8 Asts: Arroyo 6
0-1

Sinan Erdem Dome, Istanbul
Referees: Recep Ankaralı (TUR), Halil Baldemir (TUR), Alper Özgök (TUR)

May 31, 2012
19:00 EEST

Report

Anadolu Efes	71–76	Beşiktaş Milangaz
Scoring by quarter: 16-11, 17-21, 18-20, 20-24
Pts: Tunçeri 18; Rebs: Kinsey 5 Asts: Lafayette, Savanović 4		Pts: Arroyo 19; Rebs: Dudley 10; Asts: Çetin 8
0-2

Sinan Erdem Dome, Istanbul
Referees: Mehmet Keseratar (TUR), Emin Moğulkoç (TUR), Kaan Büyükçil (TUR)

June 3, 2012
17:00 EEST

Report

Beşiktaş Milangaz	67–69	Anadolu Efes
Scoring by quarter: 22-9, 23-24, 13-23, 9-13
Pts: Erceg 17; Rebs: Erceg 10; Asts: Erceg 4		Pts: Gönlüm 20; Rebs: Lafayette 9 Asts: Lafayette 5
2-1

Abdi İpekçi Arena, Istanbul
Referees: Erşan Kartal (TUR), Halil Baldemir (TUR), Ali Şakacı (TUR)

June 5, 2012
20:00 EEST

Report

Beşiktaş Milangaz	81–55	Anadolu Efes
Scoring by quarter: 17-11, 25-15, 18-10, 21-19
Pts: Hawkins 23; Rebs: Mensah-Bonsu 12; Asts: Hawkins 7		Pts: Gönlüm 12; Rebs: Batista 7 Asts: Vujačić 4
3-1

Abdi İpekçi Arena, Istanbul
Referees: Murat Biricik (TUR), Erman Erdemli (TUR), Alper Özgök (TUR)

June 8, 2012
20:00 EEST

Report

Anadolu Efes	84–82 (OT)	Beşiktaş Milangaz
Scoring by quarter: 15-12, 23-21, 15-24, 20-16, Overtime: 11-9
Pts: Gönlüm 19; Rebs: Gönlüm 6 Asts: Tunçeri 8		Pts: Arroyo 20; Rebs: Dudley 12; Asts: Arroyo 8
2-3

Sinan Erdem Dome, Istanbul
Referees: Mehmet Keseratar (TUR), Rüştü Nuran (TUR), Mehmet Serdar Ünal (TUR)

June 11, 2012
20:00 EEST

Report

Beşiktaş Milangaz	80–76	Anadolu Efes
Scoring by quarter: 20-18, 20-21, 21-22, 19-15
Pts: Arroyo 18; Rebs: Mensah-Bonsu 8 Asts: Arroyo 8		Pts: Tunçeri 22; Rebs: Batista 7 Asts: Lafayette 5
Beşiktaş Milangaz wins series 4-2

Abdi İpekçi Arena, Istanbul
Referees: Recep Ankaralı (TUR), Erşan Kartal (TUR), Kaan Büyükçil (TUR)

2012 TBL Champions
Beşiktaş Milangaz
2nd Title
