= 2009 TBL Playoffs =

TBL Playoffs
- Season: 2008–09
- Dates: 14 May – 17 June 2009
- Games played: 22
- Teams: 8

Finals
- Champions: Efes Pilsen (13th title)
- Runners-up: Fenerbahçe Ülker
- Semifinalists: Türk Telekom; Galatasaray Cafe Crown
- Finals MVP: (United States) Bootsy Thornton
- All statistics correct as of 21 May 2019.

2009 Turkish Basketball League (TBL) Playoffs was the final phase of the 2008–09 Turkish Basketball League season. The playoffs started on 14 May 2009. Fenerbahçe Ülker were the defending champions.

The eight highest placed teams of the regular season qualified for the playoffs. All series were best-of-5 except the final, which was best-of-7. Under Turkish league rules, if a team swept its playoff opponent in the regular season, it was granted an automatic 1–0 series lead, and the series started with Game 2.

Efes Pilsen competed against Fenerbahçe Ülker in the finals, won the series 4-2 and got their 13th championship.

== Play-offs ==
Quarter Finals
1	Efes Pilsen	3
8	Darüşşafaka	0
4	Galatasaray Cafe Crown	3
5	Beşiktaş Cola Turka	0
2	Türk Telekom	3
7	Mersin BB	1
3	Fenerbahçe Ülker	3
6	Antalya BB	0

SemiFinals
1	Efes Pilsen	3
4	Galatasaray Cafe Crown	0
2	Türk Telekom	2
3	Fenerbahçe Ülker	3

Finals
1	Efes Pilsen	4
3	Fenerbahçe Ülker	2

2009 TBL Champions
Efes Pilsen
13th Title
