= 2011–12 Turkish Basketball League =

- League: Turkish Basketball League
- Sport: Basketball
- Games: 240 (regular season)
- Teams: 16
- Total attendance: 540,756
- Average attendance: 2,056
- TV partner: Lig TV

Regular Season
- Season champions: Beşiktaş Milangaz
- Top scorer: (United States) Jonathan Gibson (Trabzonspor)

TBL Playoffs

TBL Finals
- Champions: Beşiktaş Milangaz
- Runners-up: Anadolu Efes
- Finals MVP: (Puerto Rico) Carlos Arroyo

TBL seasons
- ← 2010–11 2012–13 →

The 2011–12 Turkish Basketball League, officially named the Beko Basketball League for sponsorship reasons, was the 46th season of the top professional basketball league in Turkey. The regular season started on October 15, 2011 and ended on May 2, 2012. Playoffs started on May 5, 2012

== Clubs and arenas ==
The league consists of the following member clubs:

Club	Location	Foun.Year	Arena	Capacity	Nr.Ch.	Last Year
Aliağa Petkim	İzmir	1963	Enka Sport Hall	2,500	--	14th(RS)
Anadolu Efes	Istanbul	1976	Sinan Erdem Dome	16,500	13	4th(RS), SF(Play-off)
Antalya BB	Antalya	1995	Dilek Sabancı Sport Hall	2,500	--	8th(RS), QF(Play-off)
Bandirma Kirmizi	Bandırma	2005	Kara Ali Acar Sport Hall	2,500	--	Winner (TB2L)
Banvit	Bandırma	1994	Kara Ali Acar Sport Hall	2,500	--	2nd(RS), SF(Play-off)
Beşiktaş Milangaz	Istanbul	1933	Beşiktaş Milangaz Arena	3,500	1	6th(RS), QF(Play-off)
Erdemir	Zonguldak	1966	Erdemir Sport Hall	2,250	--	12th(RS)
Fenerbahçe Ülker	Istanbul	1913	Ülker Sports Arena	13,800	5	1st(RS), Winner(Play-off)
Galatasaray Medical Park	Istanbul	1911	Abdi İpekçi Arena	12,500	4	3rd(RS), RU(Play-off)
Hacettepe Üniv.	Ankara	1982	Ankara Arena	10,400	--	2nd (TB2L)
Mersin BB	Mersin	1993	Edip Buran Sport Hall	2,500	--	13th(RS)
Olin Edirne	Edirne	2006	Mimar Sinan Sport Hall	2,100	--	7th(RS), QF(Play-off)
Pınar Karşıyaka	İzmir	1966	Karşıyaka Arena	5,000	1	5th(RS), QF(Play-off)
Tofaş	Bursa	1974	Bursa Atatürk Sport Hall	2,900	2	9th(RS)
Trabzonspor	Trabzon	2008	Hayri Gür Arena	7,500	--	11th(RS)
Türk Telekom	Ankara	1980	Ankara Arena	10,400	--	10th(RS)

Locations of the 2011–12 Turkish Basketball League Clubs

== Regular season ==
=== League table ===
Pos	Team	Pld	W	L	PF	PA	PD	Pts	Qualification or relegation
1	Galatasaray Medical Park	30	25	5	2503	2197	+306	55	Qualification to playoffs
2	Banvit	30	25	5	2434	2174	+260	55	Qualification to playoffs
3	Anadolu Efes	30	24	6	2479	2142	+337	54	Qualification to playoffs
4	Beşiktaş Milangaz	30	22	8	2570	2321	+249	52	Qualification to playoffs
5	Fenerbahçe Ülker	30	21	9	2406	2228	+178	51	Qualification to playoffs
6	Pınar Karşıyaka	30	19	11	2529	2378	+151	49	Qualification to playoffs
7	Aliağa Petkim	30	14	16	2308	2351	−43	44	Qualification to playoffs
8	Tofaş	30	14	16	2323	2350	−27	44	Qualification to playoffs
9	Türk Telekom	30	13	17	2421	2464	−43	43	
10	Mersin BB	30	12	18	2424	2519	−95	42	
11	Erdemirspor	30	12	18	2162	2276	−114	42	
12	Hacettepe Üniversitesi	30	11	19	2145	2386	−241	41	
13	Antalya BB	30	10	20	2473	2595	−122	40	
14	Olin Edirne	30	8	22	2115	2290	−175	38	
15	Trabzonspor (R)	30	6	24	2216	2437	−221	36	Relegation to TBL
16	Bandırma Kırmızı (R)	30	4	26	2016	2416	−400	34	Relegation to TBL

Source: TBL
(R) Relegated

=== Results ===
	APE	AEF	ABB	BNK	BAN	BJK	ERD	FBÜ	GSM	HAC	MBB	OLE	KSK	TOF	TSB	TTS
Aliağa Petkim		68–79	89–76	65–67	70–65	80–92	72–74	61–70	83–85	65–75	90–80	67–63	94–98	74–73	87–72	86–89
Anadolu Efes	80–65		77–70	80–56	84–76	77–86	82–53	69–67	65–74	98–64	104–72	81–57	79–74	70–58	91–72	78–70
Antalya BB	75–80	102–106		94–76	79–83	75–85	70–72	77–81	76–88	99–80	86–76	73–78	89–94	88–87	98–77	88–94
Bandırma Kırmızı	88–89	71–77	85–92		65–88	58–79	69–73	77–71	68–79	68–74	63–77	68–74	59–80	65–69	72–67	67–95
Banvit	101–77	95–86	77–75	69–62		86–67	72–64	70–66	64–73	84–66	88–82	89–71	71-79	96–85	90–85	82–76
Beşiktaş Milangaz	101–78	83–76	99–100	107–69	61–64		84–88	83–78	73–65	90–62	105–84	76–69	88–80	81–78	85–57	79–74
Erdemir	55–65	53–89	83–88	85–62	60–85	64–81		68–75	75–83	85–63	65–70	67–64	81–93	77–66	71–62	92–73
Fenerbahçe Ülker	85–74	83–90	105–89	93–60	75–79	86–82	77–60		80–79	81–68	82–81	80–63	102–99	76–68	88–63	64–83
Galatasaray Medical Park	90-72	61-69	82–92	74-55	84–73	92–81	85–81	84–72		83–46	105-67	63–58	79-72	103–102	87-67	82-75
Hacettepe Üniv.	86–81	52–75	76–79	69–62	73–78	81–80	73–76	58–79	68–86		71–73	74–80	75–91	73–67	78–74	80–78
Mersin BB	82–89	78–106	102–65	77–72	70–83	82–98	98–81	81–83	106–99	69–75		91–83	79–93	61–72	92–80	96–85
Olin Edirne	72–77	67–88	91–72	81–60	56–72	64–76	62–75	48–81	71–98	87–75	86–81		65–75	68–77	67–74	85–94
Pınar Karşıyaka	88–81	59–71	95–85	89–62	70–83	93–100	80–71	75–77	67–75	100–76	75–69	70–90		87–66	99–91	98–110
Tofaş	65–74	97–96	90–73	77–63	70–78	96–90	74–70	89–87	75–95	71–79	81–88	68–57	74–80		84–83	83–71
Trabzonspor	67–77	64–69	92–63	77–64	72–78	77–81	75–67	74–84	70–88	76–78	66–78	71–69	69–90	72–78		89–78
Türk Telekom	59–78	95-87	94-85	65–72	60–84	88–97	80–76	76–78	74–82	75–73	88–82	77–69	67–88	75–83	103–81	

Last updated: 2 May 2012.
Source: TBL Fixtures

== Playoffs ==
Quarter-finals
1	Galatasaray Medical Park	2
8	Tofaş	0
4	Beşiktaş Milangaz	2
5	Fenerbahçe Ülker	0
2	Banvit	2
7	Aliağa Petkim	0
3	Anadolu Efes	2
6	Pınar Karşıyaka	0

Semi-finals
1	Galatasaray Medical Park	1
4	Beşiktaş Milangaz	3
2	Banvit	2
3	Anadolu Efes	3

Finals
4	Beşiktaş Milangaz	4
3	Anadolu Efes	2

== Individual statistics ==
=== Points ===
Rank	Name	Team	Pts	G	PPG
1.	(United States) Jonathan Gibson	Trabzonspor	577	29	19.9
2.	(United States) Mire Chatman	Pınar Karşıyaka	587	32	18.3
3.	(United States) Elton Brown	Trabzonspor	428	24	17.8
4.	(United States) Ryan Toolson	Aliağa Petkim	501	29	17.3
5.	(United States) Corey Fisher	Antalya BB	516	30	17.2

=== Rebounds ===
Rank	Name	Team	Rbs	G	RPG
1.	(United States) Elton Brown	Trabzonspor	289	24	12.0
2.	(Serbia) Vladimir Štimac	Olin Edirne	298	30	9.9
3.	(United States) Melvin Sanders	Hacettepe Üniv.	258	29	8.9
4.	(United Kingdom) Pops Mensah-Bonsu	Beşiktaş Milangaz	213	27	7.9
5.	(United States) K'zell Wesson	Erdemir	232	30	7.7

=== Assists ===
Rank	Name	Team	Ast	G	APG
1.	(United States) Mire Chatman	Pınar Karşıyaka	205	32	6.4
2.	(Turkey) Barış Ermiş	Banvit	208	36	5.8
3.	(Serbia) Branislav Ratkovica	Aliağa Petkim	163	31	5.3
4.	(Turkey) Kerem Tunçeri	Anadolu Efes	183	35	5.2
5.	(Turkey) Soner Şentürk	Erdemir	147	30	4.9

=== Blocks ===
Rank	Name	Team	Blk	G	BPG
1.	(United Kingdom) Matthew Bryan-Amaning	Hacettepe Üniv.	40	30	1.3
2.	(United States) Charles Davis	Banvit	41	34	1.2
3.	(United States) Antywane Robinson	Erdemir	34	30	1.1
4.	(United States) Gary McGhee	Bandırma Kırmızı	29	30	1.0
5.	(United States) James Gist	Fenerbahçe Ülker	28	31	0.9

=== Steals ===
Rank	Name	Team	Stl	G	SPG
1.	(United States) Russell Robinson	Trabzonspor	37	18	2.1
2.	(United Kingdom) Matthew Bryan-Amaning	Hacettepe Üniv.	59	30	2.0
3.	(United States) Mire Chatman	Pınar Karşıyaka	60	32	1.9
4.	(United States) Jamon Gordon	Galatasaray MP	59	36	1.6
5.	(United States) Anthony Grundy	Mersin BB	49	30	1.6

Last updated: 26 May 2012.
Source: TBL Stats
