= 2010 TBL Playoffs =

TBL Playoffs
- Season: 2009–10
- Dates: 29 April – 2 June 2010
- Games played: 23
- Teams: 8

Finals
- Champions: Fenerbahçe Ülker (4th title)
- Runners-up: Efes Pilsen
- Semifinalists: Banvit; Beşiktaş Cola Turka
- Finals MVP: (United States) Tarence Kinsey
- All statistics correct as of 16 May 2019.

2010 Turkish Basketball League (TBL) Playoffs was the final phase of the 2009–10 Turkish Basketball League season. The playoffs started on 29 April 2010. Efes Pilsen were the defending champions.

The eight highest placed teams of the regular season qualified for the playoffs. All series were best-of-5 except the final, which was best-of-7. Under Turkish league rules, if a team swept its playoff opponent in the regular season, it was granted an automatic 1–0 series lead, and the series started with Game 2.

Fenerbahçe Ülker competed against Efes Pilsen in the finals, won the series 4-2 and got their 4th championship.

== Play-offs ==
Quarter Finals
1	Efes Pilsen	3
8	Erdemirspor	0
4	Beşiktaş Cola Turka	3
5	Türk Telekom	1
2	Fenerbahçe Ülker	3
7	Bornova Belediye	0
3	Banvit	3
6	Pınar Karşıyaka	1

SemiFinals
1	Efes Pilsen	3
4	Beşiktaş Cola Turka	0
2	Fenerbahçe Ülker	1
3	Banvit	0

Finals
1	Efes Pilsen	2
3	Fenerbahçe Ülker	4

2010 TBL Champions
Fenerbahçe Ülker
4th Title
