= 2007–08 Turkish Basketball League =

Basketball league in Turkey

Turkish Basketball League
- Season: 2007–08
- TV partner(s): Lig TV

Regular season
- Relegated: Alpella, TTNet Beykoz

Finals
- Champions: Fenerbahçe Ülker (3rd title)
- Runners-up: Türk Telekom
- Semifinalists: Efes Pilsen, Beşiktaş Cola Turka

Statistical leaders
Points	Gary Neal	23.6
Rebounds	Quinton Hosley	11.8
Assists	Hakan Köseoğlu	6.9

Records
- Attendance: 439,707
- Average attendance: 1,666

The 2007–08 Turkish Basketball League was the 42nd season of the top professional basketball league in Turkey. Beşiktaş Cola Turka finished first in the regular season and Fenerbahçe Ülker won their third national championship at the end of playoffs.

== Regular season standings ==
Last updated May 10, 2008

Clinched play-off berth
Season over
Relegated

Pos	Club	Pld	W	L	PF	PA	±	Pts
1	Beşiktaş Cola Turka	30	24	6	2496	2235	+261	54
2	Efes Pilsen S.K.	30	22	8	2471	2209	+262	52
3	Fenerbahçe Ülker	30	21	9	2447	2227	+220	51
4	Türk Telekom B.K.	30	20	10	2689	2435	+254	50
5	Galatasaray Café Crown	30	19	11	2319	2174	+145	49
6	Antalya BŞB	30	18	12	2353	2327	+26	48
7	Pınar Karşıyaka	30	17	13	2608	2528	+80	47
8	Banvitspor	30	14	16	2440	2410	+30	44
9	CASA TED Kolejliler	30	13	17	2285	2404	-119	43
10	Mersin BŞB	30	13	17	2297	2378	-81	43
11	Kepez Belediye	30	12	18	2297	2335	-38	42
12	Oyak Renault	30	12	18	2021	2164	-143	42
13	Mutlu Akü Selçuk Üniversitesi	30	10	20	2386	2673	-287	40
14	Darüşşafaka	30	9	21	2280	2461	-181	39
15	Alpella	30	8	22	2150	2391	-241	38
16	TTNet Beykoz	30	8	22	2271	2459	-188	38

Alpella and TTNet Beykoz were relegated to Turkish Second Basketball League. Erdemirspor and Aliağa Belediyespor will play in Turkish Basketball League in 2008–2009 season.

== Turkish Basketball League 2007/2008 play-offs ==
Turkish Basketball League play-offs started on Saturday, May 3, 2008 and ran through June 4, 2008 with the League finals.

Quarterfinal and Semifinal series are 5-match series. The teams first to reach 3 wins goes through to the next round. The team which has won both regular season match-ups starts with a 1–0 lead to the series.

Final series are 7-match series and the team that is first to reach 4 wins is the champion of the Turkish Basketball League.

Quarter Finals
1	Beşiktaş Cola Turka	3
8	Bandırma Banvit	1
4	Türk Telekom	3
5	Galatasaray	0
2	Efes Pilsen	3
7	Pınar Karşıyaka	1
3	Fenerbahçe Ülker	3
6	Antalya Belediye	1

SemiFinals
1	Beşiktaş Cola Turka	1
4	Türk Telekom	3
2	Efes Pisen	0
3	Fenerbahçe Ülker	3

Finals
3	Fenerbahçe Ülker	4
4	Türk Telekom	1

Turkish Basketball League
2007–08 Champion
Fenerbahçe Ülker
Third Title

== 2007–08 play-off seedings, results and schedules ==
=== Quarter finals ===
(1) Beşiktaş Cola Turka (24–6) vs. (8) Bandırma Banvit (14–16) (Series starts 1–0)

- Game 1 3 May @ Beşiktaş Arena, İstanbul: Beşiktaş Cola Turka: 85, Bandırma Banvit: 81 (2–0)
- Game 2 8 May @ Kara Ali Acar, Balıkesir: Bandırma Banvit: 90, Beşiktaş Cola Turka: 89 (1–2)
- Game 3 10 May @ Kara Ali Acar, Balıkesir: Bandırma Banvit: 96, Beşiktaş Cola Turka: 102 (1–3)

Beşiktaş Cola Turka wins the series 3:1

(2) Efes Pilsen (22–8) vs. (7) Pınar Karşıyaka (17–13) (Series starts 0–0)

- Game 1 4 May @ Abdi İpekçi, İstanbul: Efes Pilsen: 73, Pınar Karşıyaka: 79 (0–1)
- Game 2 6 May @ Abdi İpekçi, İstanbul: Efes Pilsen: 78, Pınar Karşıyaka: 56 (1–1)
- Game 3 10 May @ KY Pınar Arena, İzmir: Pınar Karşıyaka: 82, Efes Pilsen: 95 (1–2)
- Game 4 12 May @ KY Pınar Arena, İzmir: Pınar Karşıyaka: 77, Efes Pilsen: 85 (1–3)

Efes Pilsen wins the series 3:1

(3) Fenerbahçe Ülker (21–9) vs. (6) Antalya Belediye (18–12) (Series starts 0–0)

- Game 1 4 May @ Abdi İpekçi, İstanbul: Fenerbahçe Ülker: 78, Antalya Belediye: 73 (1–0)
- Game 2 6 May @ Abdi İpekçi, İstanbul: Fenerbahçe Ülker: 81, Antalya Belediye: 76 (2–0)
- Game 3 10 May @ Atatürk SH, Antalya: Antalya Belediye: 88, Fenerbahçe Ülker: 82 (1–2)
- Game 4 12 May @ Atatürk SH, Antalya: Antalya Belediye: 78, Fenerbahçe Ülker: 85 (1–3)

Fenerbahçe Ülker wins the series 3:1

(4) Türk Telekom (20–10) vs. (5) Galatasaray Café Crown (19–11) (Series starts 0–0)

- Game 1 5 May @ Atatürk Sports Hall, Ankara: Türk Telekom: 78, Galatasaray: 71 (1–0)
- Game 2 7 May @ Atatürk Sports Hall, Ankara: Türk Telekom: 73, Galatasaray: 68 (2–0)
- Game 3 11 May @ Ayhan Şahenk Hall, İstanbul: Galatasaray: 86, Türk Telekom: 88 (0–3)

Türk Telekom wins the series 3:0

=== Semifinals ===
(1) Beşiktaş Cola Turka (24–6) vs. (4) Türk Telekom (20–10) (Series starts 0–1)

- Game 1 16 May @ Beşiktaş Arena, İstanbul: Beşiktaş Cola Turka: 87, Türk Telekom: 77 (1–1)
- Game 2 19 May @ Atatürk Sports H., Ankara: Türk Telekom: 79, Beşiktaş Cola Turka: 74 (2–1)
- Game 3 21 May @ Atatürk Sports H., Ankara: Türk Telekom: 75, Beşiktaş Cola Turka: 71 (3–1)

Türk Telekom wins the series 3:1

(2) Efes Pilsen (22–8) vs. (3) Fenerbahçe Ülker (21–9) (Series starts 0–1)

- Game 1 17 May @ Abdi İpekçi, İstanbul: Efes Pilsen: 65, Fenerbahçe Ülker: 76 (0–2)
- Game 2 20 May @ Abdi İpekçi, İstanbul: Fenerbahçe Ülker: 82, Efes Pilsen: 75 (3–0)

Fenerbahçe Ülker wins the series 3:0

=== Beko Basketball League Finals ===
(3) Fenerbahçe Ülker (21–9) vs. (4) Türk Telekom (20–10) (Series starts 0–0)

- Game 1 25 May @ Abdi İpekçi Arena, İstanbul: Fenerbahçe Ülker: 100, Türk Telekom: 72 (1–0)
- Game 2 27 May @ Abdi İpekçi Arena, İstanbul: Fenerbahçe Ülker: 99, Türk Telekom: 87 (2–0)
- Game 3 30 May @ Atatürk Sports Hall, Ankara: Türk Telekom: 87, Fenerbahçe Ülker: 75 (1–2)
- Game 4 1 June @ Atatürk Sports Hall, Ankara: Türk Telekom: 94, Fenerbahçe Ülker: 96 (OT) (1–3)
- Game 5 4 June @ Abdi İpekçi Arena, İstanbul: Fenerbahçe Ülker: 90, Türk Telekom: 79 (4–1)

== Stat leaders ==
=== Points per game ===
Pos.	Name	Team	Pts.pg
1.	(United States) Gary Neal	Pınar Karşıyaka	23.6
2.	(United States) Quinton Hosley	Pınar Karşıyaka	22.9
3.	(United States) Lorenzo Gordon	Kepez Belediye	21.3
4.	(United States) Kevin Braswell	Mutlu Akü Selçuk Üni.	21.1
5.	(United States) Sean Marshall	Pınar Karşıyaka	18.8
6.	(United States) Ricardo Marsh	Antalya BŞB	18.7
6.	(United States) Warren Renard Carter	Mutlu Akü Selçuk Üni.	18.0

=== Rebounds per game ===
Pos.	Name	Team	Reb.pg
1.	(United States) Quinton Hosley	Pınar Karşıyaka,	11.7
2.	(Nigeria) Kenny Adeleke	Banvitspor	11.4
3.	(United States) Donnell Harvey	Banvitspor	10.7
4.	(United States) Damien Lamone Kinloch	Alpella B.K.	10.6
5.	(United States) Chris Burgess	TTNet Beykoz	9.2
6.	(Croatia) Tomislav Ruzic	Kepez Belediye	9.0

=== Assists per game ===
Pos.	Name	Team	Ast.pg
1.	(Turkey) Hakan Köseoğlu	Kepez Belediye	6.9
2.	(United States) Kevin Braswell	Mutlu Akü Selçuk Üni.	6.1
3.	(United States) Willie Solomon	Fenerbahçe Ülker	5.7
4.	(Turkey) Tutku Açık	Türk Telekom B.K.	5.0
5.	(United States) Henry Dobie	CASA TED Kolejliler	4.9
6.	(United States) Dee Brown	Galatasaray	4.8

== See also ==
- Turkish Basketball League 2008-2009
- Turkish Basketball League 2006-2007
