= Melih Mahmutoğlu =

Turkish basketball player (born 1990)

- Mahmutoğlu with Fenerbahçe in 2026

No. 10 – Fenerbahçe
- Position: Shooting guard
- League: BSL; EuroLeague

Personal information
- Born: 12 May 1990 (age 36) Istanbul, Turkey
- Listed height: 1.91 m (6 ft 3 in)
- Listed weight: 85 kg (187 lb)

Career information
- NBA draft: 2012: undrafted
- Playing career: 2007–present

Career history
- 2007–2008: Pertevniyal
- 2008–2010: Darüşşafaka
- 2010–2012: Galatasaray
- 2011–2012: →Antalya BB
- 2012–2013: Erdemirspor
- 2013–present: Fenerbahçe

Career highlights
- 2× EuroLeague champion (2017, 2025); 8× Turkish League champion (2014, 2016–2018, 2022, 2024–2026); 6× Turkish Cup winner (2016, 2019, 2020, 2024–2026); 5× Turkish Presidential Cup winner (2013, 2016, 2017, 2025, 2026); 3× Turkish League Three-Point Contest champion (2016, 2017, 2020)
Medals
Men's basketball
Representing Turkey
Mediterranean Games
Gold medal – first place	2013 Turkey	Team

Melih Mahmutoğlu (born 12 May 1990) is a Turkish professional basketball player and the team captain for Fenerbahçe of the Turkish Basketball Super League (BSL) and the EuroLeague.

He is the most decorated Turkish basketball player with 21 titles in club level.

== Club career ==
=== Early years ===
Mahmutoğlu started to play youth basketball with Genç Boğaziçispor. He transferred to the youth clubs of Efes Pilsen in 1999, and was developed in the Efes Pilsen junior clubs. He made his professional debut in the Turkish Second Division with Pertevniyal, Efes Pilsen's feeder club, during the 2007–08 season.

He signed a contract with Darüşşafaka in 2008. He averaged 7.3 points and 1.4 rebounds with them in the Turkish First Division, in the 2008–09 season.

He signed a contract with Galatasaray in 2010. He was loaned to Antalya BB for the 2011–12 season, where he averaged 11.8 points, 1.9 rebounds, and 1.0 assists per game in the top-tier level Turkish League.

In the summer of 2012, he moved to Erdemirspor. Mahmutoğlu's scoring average with Erdemirspor, of 12.2 points per game, over 30 games played in the Turkish League's 2012–13 season, drew the attention of some bigger European clubs towards him.

=== Fenerbahçe (2013–present) ===
In August 2013, Mahmutoğlu signed a two-year contract with an option to extend it for one more season, with Fenerbahçe. In his first EuroLeague season, he averaged 5.5 points and 1.2 rebounds per game, over 22 games, while shooting 44.8% from the field.

In the 2014–15 season, Fenerbahçe advanced to the EuroLeague Final Four, for the first time in the team's history. On 15 May 2015 Fenerbahçe lost in the EuroLeague semifinal game to Real Madrid, by a score of 87–96.

Before the start of the 2015–16 season, he was named the team's captain, after departure of Emir Preldžić. In 2016, Fenerbahçe won the Turkish Cup, with a 67–65 win over Darüşşafaka. Fenerbahçe also reached the final game of the 2016 Euroleague Final Four, but fell short of winning the EuroLeague championship, after an overtime 96–101 loss to CSKA Moscow. Over 18 EuroLeague games, he averaged 4 points per game. At the end of the season, Fenerbahçe also won the Turkish League championship.

On 27 September 2016 he signed a three-year contract extension with the team.

In 2017–18 EuroLeague, Fenerbahçe made it to the 2018 EuroLeague Final Four, its fourth consecutive Final Four appearance. Eventually, they lost to Real Madrid with 80–85 in the final game.

He helped Fenerbahçe to their second EuroLeague championship.

== International career ==
With the junior national teams of Turkey, Mahmutoğlu played at the 2006 FIBA Europe Under-16 Championship, at the 2007 FIBA Europe Under-18 Championship, and the 2008 FIBA Europe Under-18 Championship, at the 2009 and at the 2010 FIBA Europe Under-20 Championships. He also played for the Turkish national team, and won the gold medal, at the 2013 Mediterranean Games. He also played with the senior Turkish national basketball team at the EuroBasket 2015.

== Career statistics ==
Legend
GP	Games played	GS	Games started	MPG	Minutes per game
FG%	Field-goal percentage	3P%	3-point field-goal percentage	FT%	Free-throw percentage
RPG	Rebounds per game	APG	Assists per game	SPG	Steals per game
BPG	Blocks per game	PPG	Points per game	PIR	Performance index rating
**Bold**	Career high	†	Won a EuroLeague championship

=== EuroLeague ===
Year	Team	GP	GS	MPG	FG%	3P%	FT%	RPG	APG	SPG	BPG	PPG	PIR
2013–14	Fenerbahçe	22	7	14.5	.448	.415	.923	**1.2**	**.6**	**.5**	—	5.5	3.6
2014–15	Fenerbahçe	16	2	7.4	.351	.393	—	.7	.3	—	—	2.3	0.8
2015–16	Fenerbahçe	18	2	12.2	.410	.404	.500	.7	.4	.2	—	4.0	1.5
2016–17†	Fenerbahçe	20	4	10.4	.426	.438	**1.000**	.5	**.6**	.3	—	4.0	2.7
2017–18	Fenerbahçe	21	4	6.7	.325	.286	**1.000**	.5	.2	.1	—	1.7	0.6
2018–19	Fenerbahçe	**31**	5	12.0	**.508**	.461	.950	.8	.5	.2	—	5.6	**4.4**
2019–20	Fenerbahçe	21	**9**	**17.2**	.463	**.508**	.800	.8	.5	.3	—	**6.5**	3.4
2020–21	Fenerbahçe	28	5	13.7	.415	.328	.857	.7	.3	.2	—	4.1	1.7
2021–22	Fenerbahçe	23	6	10.7	.385	.297	.727	.3	.3	.3	—	4.4	1.7
2022–23	Fenerbahçe	19	0	10.4	.438	.403	**1.000**	.7	.4	.1	—	5.4	3.6
2023–24	Fenerbahçe	9	0	4.6	.333	.333	—	.1	.1	.1	—	1.6	0.7
2024–25†	Fenerbahçe	6	1	5.3	.500	.400	.0	.3	.2	—	—	2.3	1.0
2025–26	Fenerbahçe	7	1	5.3	.250	.307	**1.000**	.4	.2	—	—	2.1	.7
2026–27	Fenerbahçe	0	0	0:00	.000	.000	.000	.0	.0	.0	.0	.0	.0
Career		241	46	11.1	.487	.398	.892	.1	.6	.7	.0	4.2	2.3

=== EuroCup ===
Year	Team	GP	GS	MPG	FG%	3P%	FT%	RPG	APG	SPG	BPG	PPG	PIR
2010–11	Galatasaray	3	1	8.3	.333	.500	1.000	.7	—	—	—	2.3	0.3
Career		3	1	8.3	.333	.500	1.000	.7	—	—	—	2.3	0.3

=== Domestic leagues ===
†	Denotes seasons in which Mahmutoğlu won the domestic league

Year	Team	League	GP	MPG	FG%	3P%	FT%	RPG	APG	SPG	BPG	PPG
2009–10	(Turkey) Darüşşafaka	TBSL	28	18.0	.375	.361	.429	1.3	.8	.4	—	5.9
2010–11	(Turkey) Galatasaray	TBSL	13	7.5	.395	.276	1.000	.7	.5	.2	—	3.5
2011–12	(Turkey) Antalya BB	TBSL	30	26.4	.446	.401	.733	1.9	.9	.4	—	11.8
2012–13	(Turkey) Erdemirspor	TBSL	30	28.1	.451	.384	.700	2.0	.9	.5	—	12.2
2013–14 †	(Turkey) Fenerbahçe	TBSL	39	19.5	.432	.371	.853	2.0	1.1	.4	—	6.9
2014–15	(Turkey) Fenerbahçe	TBSL	31	14.8	.503	.457	.800	1.0	.8	.1	—	7.3
2015–16 †	(Turkey) Fenerbahçe	TBSL	42	15.8	.508	.435	.846	1.0	.6	.2	—	6.0
2016–17 †	(Turkey) Fenerbahçe	TBSL	37	16.2	.489	.415	.905	1.0	1.0	.2	—	6.5
2017–18 †	(Turkey) Fenerbahçe	TBSL	39	19.8	.529	.439	.857	1.1	1.7	.4	—	9.4
2018–19	(Turkey) Fenerbahçe	TBSL	40	22.6	.454	.381	.862	1.7	1.4	.4	—	8.9
2019–20	(Turkey) Fenerbahçe	TBSL	23	25.2	.514	.395	1.000	1.8	.9	.6	—	12.8
2020–21	(Turkey) Fenerbahçe	TBSL	34	23.3	.497	.450	.968	1.2	.8	.4	—	11.3
2021–22 †	(Turkey) Fenerbahçe	TBSL	41	17.7	.498	.440	.905	.9	.9	.4	—	10.4
2022–23	(Turkey) Fenerbahçe	TBSL	36	14.4	.431	.418	1.000	.9	.5	.2	—	6.6
2023–24 †	(Turkey) Fenerbahçe	TBSL	39	19.8	.473	.384	.822	1.2	1.3	.4	—	9.0
2024–25 †	(Turkey) Fenerbahçe	TBSL	39	20.6	.584	.466	.800	1.3	.7	.2	—	9.6

== Personal life ==
Mahmutoğlu, whose original surname was Brničanin, originates from Serbia's southwestern city of Novi Pazar. He is of Bosniak origin.
