= Can Akın =

Turkish basketball player (born 1983)

Türk Telekom
- Title: Assistant coach
- League: Basketbol Süper Ligi

Personal information
- Born: January 30, 1983 (age 43) Istanbul, Turkey
- Listed height: 6 ft 2.75 in (1.90 m)
- Listed weight: 183 lb (83 kg)

Career information
- Playing career: 2002–2021
- Position: Point guard

Career history

Playing
- 2002–2004: Türk Telekom
- 2004–2006: Bandırma Banvit
- 2006–2007: Efes Pilsen
- 2007–2009: Antalya BB
- 2009–2010: Galatasaray
- 2010–2011: Olin Edirne Basket
- 2011–2013: Beşiktaş
- 2013–2014: Türk Telekom
- 2014–2015: İstanbul BB
- 2015–2017: Sakarya BB
- 2017–2019: Türk Telekom
- 2019–2020: Mamak Belediye Yeni Mamak Spor
- 2020–2021: Aliağa Petkim

Coaching
- 2021–2022: TED Ankara Kolejliler (assistant)
- 2022–present: Türk Telekom (assistant)

Career highlights
- TBL Champion (2012); Turkish Cup Champion (2012); FIBA EuroChallenge Champion (2012)

Fikret Can Akın (born January 30, 1983) is a Turkish professional basketball coach and former player who played at the point guard position. He is serving as an assistant coach for Türk Telekom of the Turkish Basketbol Süper Ligi (BSL).
