= Gerrod Henderson =

American basketball player

Personal information
- Born: October 30, 1978 (age 48) Haynesville, Louisiana, U.S.
- Listed height: 6 ft 4 in (1.93 m)
- Listed weight: 205 lb (93 kg)

Career information
- High school: Haynesville (Haynesville, Louisiana)
- College: Louisiana Tech (1998–2002)
- NBA draft: 2002: undrafted
- Playing career: 2002–2013
- Position: Shooting guard

Career history
- 2002–2003: Panionios
- 2003–2004: Hemofarm
- 2004–2005: Panionios
- 2004–2005: Crvena zvezda
- 2005–2006: Kolossos Rodou
- 2006: Crvena zvezda
- 2006–2007: Ironi Nahariya
- 2007–2008: Anwil Wloclawek
- 2007–2008: Azovmash
- 2008: Anwil Wloclawek
- 2009: Politekhnika-Halychyna
- 2009–2010: Budivelnyk
- 2010–2011: Antalya BB
- 2011–2013: Erdemirspor
- 2013: Mersin BB

Career highlights
- Sun Belt Player of the Year (2000); First-team All-Sun Belt (2000); First-team All-WAC (2002)

Gerrod Dewayne Henderson (born October 30, 1978) is an American former professional basketball player who last played for Mersin BB of the Turkish Basketball League.

He played for Panionios, Hemofarm, Crvena zvezda, Anwil Włocławek, Azovmash Mariupol, Erdemirspor and Antalya.
