= Ahmet Erdoğan (basketball) =

Turkish basketball player (born 1986)

No. 13 – Aliağa Petkim
- Position: Point guard
- League: Turkish Basketball League; Eurochallenge

Personal information
- Born: October 24, 1986 (age 40) Konya, Turkey
- Listed height: 6 ft 1.50 in (1.87 m)
- Listed weight: 165 lb (75 kg)

Career information
- Playing career: 2006–present

Career history
- 2006–2010: Oyak Renault
- 2010–2012: Pınar Karşıyaka
- 2012–present: Aliağa Petkim

Ahmet Erdoğan (born October 24, 1986) is a Turkish professional basketball player. He currently playing for Aliağa Petkim. He is 1.87 m (6 ft 2 in) tall and 75 kg (165 lb) weight. He plays the point guard position.
