= Ahmet Erdoğan =

Ahmet Erdoğan may refer to:

- Ahmet Erdoğan (basketball) (born 1986), Turkish basketball player
- Ahmet Burak Erdoğan (born 1979), Turkish businessman and eldest son of Recep Tayyip Erdoğan
