= Predrag Samardžiski =

Macedonian basketball player (born 1986)

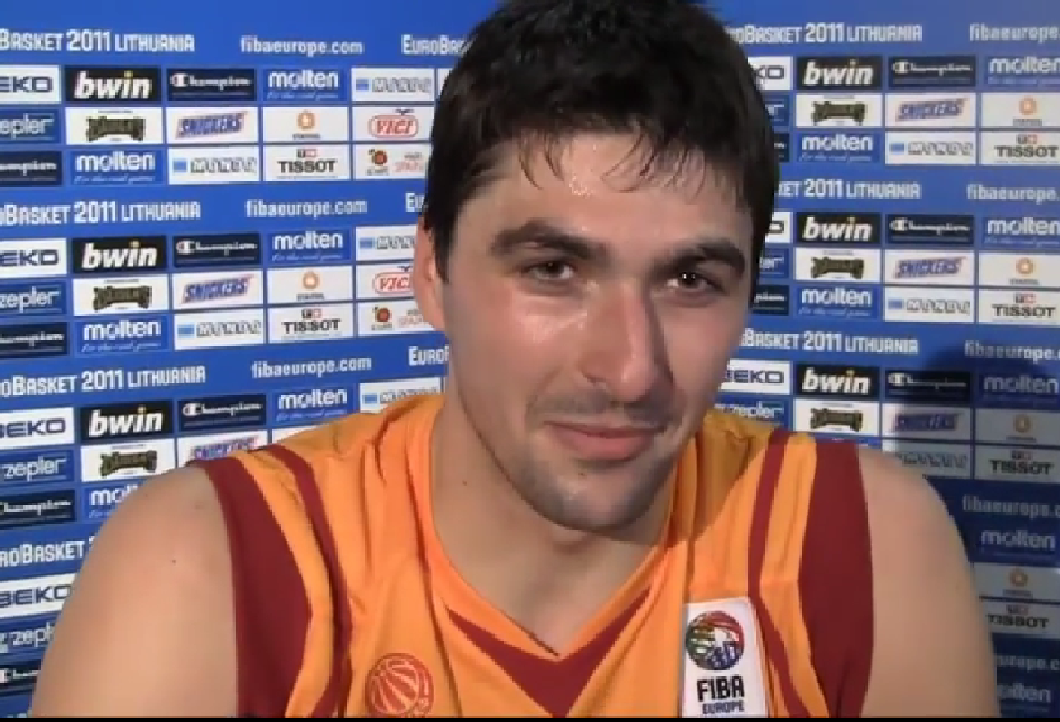
- in 2011

Personal information
- Born: April 11, 1986 (age 40) Skopje, SR Macedonia, SFR Yugoslavia
- Listed height: 2.15 m (7 ft 1 in)
- Listed weight: 275 lb (125 kg)

Career information
- NBA draft: 2008: undrafted
- Playing career: 2004–2023
- Position: Center

Career history
- 2004–2005: Partizan
- 2005–2010: FMP
- 2010–2011: Olin Edirne
- 2011–2013: Lietuvos rytas
- 2013: Crvena zvezda
- 2013–2014: Mersin BB
- 2014: TED Ankara Kolejliler
- 2014–2015: MZT Skopje Aerodrom
- 2015: Mega Basket
- 2015–2016: Tüyap Büyükçekmece
- 2017–2018: Mega Basket
- 2019: MZT Skopje Aerodrom
- 2019–2021: Samsunspor
- 2021–2022: EuroNickel 2005
- 2022–2023: OKK Beograd

Career highlights
- Adriatic League champion (2006); 2× Macedonian League champion (2015, 2019); Serbian League champion (2005); Serbian Cup winner (2007); Turkish League All-Star (2011)

Predrag Samardžiski (Macedonian: Предраг Самарџиски; born April 11, 1986) is a Macedonian former professional basketball player.

== Professional career ==
Samardžiski started his career at KK Partizan in the 2004–05 season. He then played with KK FMP for five years (2005–2010). In August 2010, he signed for Olin Edirne of Turkey. In May 2011 he signed with BC Lietuvos rytas in Lithuania.

In January 2013 he returned to Adriatic league by signing a contract with Crvena zvezda until the end of 2012–13 season. On Jule 1, 2013, he signed with Mersin Büyükşehir Belediyesi. In July 2014, he signed with TED Ankara Kolejliler. On 10 December 2014 he signed a release agreement with TED Ankara and became a free agent. On 18 December 2014 he signed with MZT Aerodrom.

In September, 2015, he signed a short-term contract with Mega Leks. On November 10, 2015, he left Mega and signed with the Turkish club Tüyap Büyükçekmece for the rest of the season.

On January 19, 2017, Samardžiski returned to Mega Leks, signing a contract for the rest of the 2016–17 season. On July 10, 2017, he re-signed with Mega. He left the Mega after the season.

== International career ==
Samardžiski plays for the Macedonian national team. He was a member of the team at the EuroBasket 2009 and he was also a key member of team that reached the semi-finals at the EuroBasket 2011, averaging 5.8 points per game throughout the tournament and ending up among the top ten shot blockers. On the 21 July, Samardžiski was named the new captain of the Macedonian national team, after the withdrawal of Pero Antić.

== Main flaws ==
Before the EuroBasket 2011, Samardžiski's greatest flaw was considered to be his inability to dunk, despite him being 2.14 metres (7 ft 0 in) tall. However, in the semi-finals against Spain, where he replaced the injured Todor Gečevski as starting center, he dunked the ball twice against Spanish centers Pau and Mark Gasol. Samardžiski had a memorable game, scoring 12 points, his highest total in the tournament, and adding five rebounds.

== Career statistics ==
Legend
GP	Games played	GS	Games started	MPG	Minutes per game
FG%	Field-goal percentage	3P%	3-point field-goal percentage	FT%	Free-throw percentage
RPG	Rebounds per game	APG	Assists per game	SPG	Steals per game
BPG	Blocks per game	PPG	Points per game	PIR	Performance index rating
**Bold**	Career high

=== Euroleague ===
Year	Team	GP	GS	MPG	FG%	3P%	FT%	RPG	APG	SPG	BPG	PPG	PIR
2004–05	Partizan	11	4	13.3	.440	.000	.250	2.9	0.5	0.8	0.4	2.5	0.9
2005–06	Partizan	2	0	3.0	.000	.000	.000	2.0	0.0	0.0	0.0	0.0	0.0
2012–13	Lietuvos rytas	10	8	15.3	.457	.000	.563	3.3	0.5	0.2	0.9	5.1	3.9
Career		23	12	13.2	.438	.000	.389	3.0	0.4	0.5	0.6	3.4	2.1

=== Eurocup statistics ===
Year	Team	GP	GS	MPG	FG%	3P%	FT%	RPG	APG	SPG	BPG	PPG	PIR
2005–06	FMP	9	2	12.7	.600	.000	.550	2.7	0.8	0.3	0.8	3.9	6.1
2006–07	FMP	15	5	18.2	.614	.000	.545	5.4	0.8	1.3	0.6	6.3	9.7
2007–08	FMP	8	7	24.0	.596	.1000	.694	7.0	1.3	1.1	0.6	11.8	15.6
2008–08	FMP	6	2	20.0	.585	.000	.525	6.5	0.3	0.8	1.3	11.5	15.2
2011–12	Lietuvos rytas	14	1	15.5	.651	.000	.600	4.5	0.9	0.8	0.7	5.3	8.7
2012–13	Crvena zvezda	3	2	15.0	.267	.000	.1000	4.3	0.7	0.3	0.3	4.0	3.0
Career		55	19	17.4	.589	.500	.592	5.0	0.8	0.9	0.7	6.9	9.9
