= Oğuz Savaş =

Turkish basketball player (born 1987)

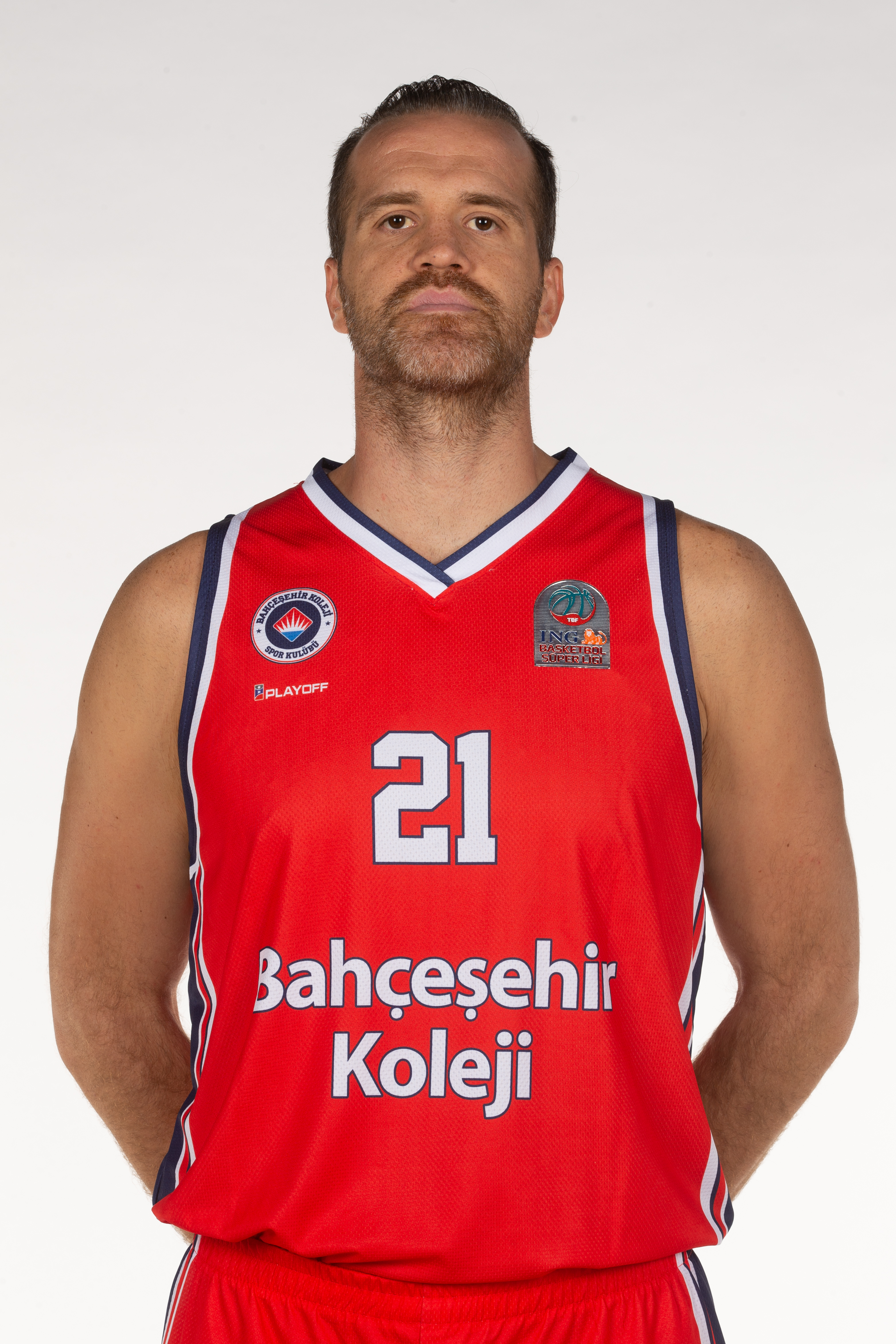
- Savaş with Bahçeşehir Koleji in 2021

Personal information
- Born: 13 July 1987 (age 39) Balıkesir, Turkey
- Listed height: 2.11 m (6 ft 11 in)
- Listed weight: 132 kg (291 lb)

Career information
- NBA draft: 2009: undrafted
- Playing career: 2004–2025
- Position: Center
- Number: 21

Career history
- 2004–2006: Ülkerspor
- 2006–2015: Fenerbahçe
- 2015–2019: Darüşşafaka
- 2019–2020: Beşiktaş
- 2020–2021: Bursaspor
- 2021–2023: Bahçeşehir Koleji
- 2023–2025: Çayırova Belediyesi

Career highlights
- FIBA Europe Cup champion (2022); Turkish League Finals MVP (2011); 6× BSL champion (2006–2008, 2010, 2011, 2014); 8× Turkish Cup winner (2005, 2010, 2011, 2013); 4× Turkish President's Cup winner (2004, 2005, 2007, 2013)
Medals
Men's basketball
Representing Turkey
FIBA World Cup
Silver medal – second place	2010 Turkey
Mediterranean Games
Gold medal – first place	2013 Turkey	Team
FIBA Europe Under-18 Championship
Silver medal – second place	2005 Serbia and Montenegro	Team
Silver medal – second place	2004 Spain	Team

Oğuz Savaş (born 13 July 1987) is a Turkish former professional basketball player. Standing at 2.11 m (6 ft 11 in), he plays the center position. He has also represented the senior Turkey national basketball team.

== Professional career ==
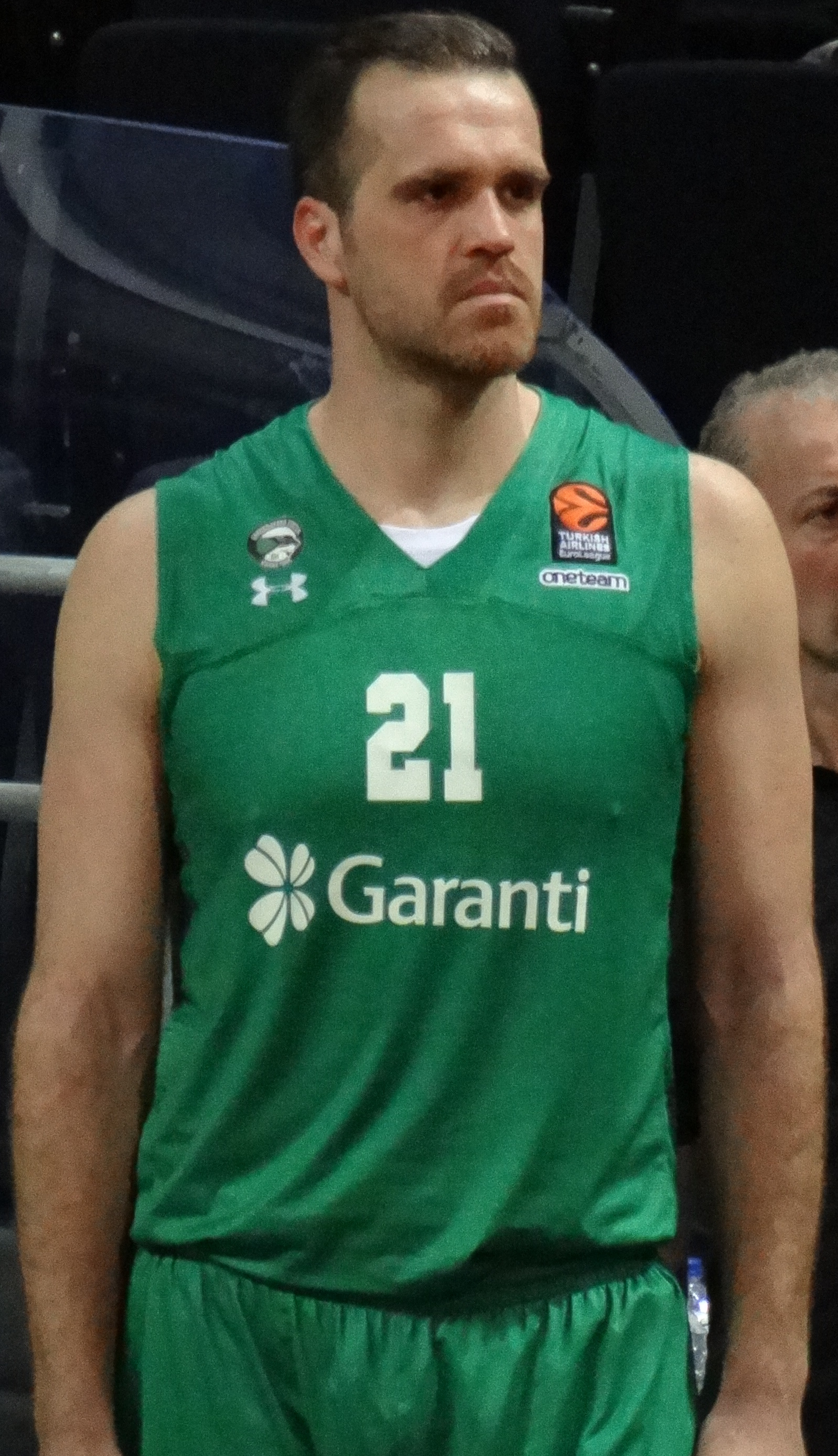
Savaş with Darüşşafaka in November 2018

Oğuz Savaş made his professional debut in Ülkerspor when he was 19. That year, he helped his team crush their way to the league championship. Savaş contributed 6.0 points and 3.2 rebound in his first season.

When Ülkerspor merged with Fenerbahçe, Oğuz Savaş also became part of the new team. He has been a regular member of the Fenerbahçe squad since.

On 26 March 2015, Savaş scored 7 points against Unicaja Malaga and reached 1000 career EuroLeague points.

In the summer of 2015, Savaş signed with Darüşşafaka.

On 15 August 2018, Savaş re-signed with Darüşşafaka for the 2018–19 season.

On 3 October 2019 he signed with Beşiktaş Sompo Japan of the Turkish Basketball Super League (BSL).

On 17 July 2020 he signed with Bursaspor of the Turkish Basketball Super League (BSL).

On 8 July 2021 he signed with Bahçeşehir Koleji of the Turkish Basketbol Süper Ligi (BSL).

By the end of 2024–25 season, he announced his retirement from professional basketball.

== Turkey national team ==
Savaş has been a regular member of the senior Turkey national basketball team, and he won the silver medal at the 2010 FIBA World Championship.

== Private life ==
Oğuz Savaş is married to Melike Demirkaya since 2010.
