= Alpella S.K. =

Turkish professional basketball team

Alpella Spor Kulübü, or Alpella B.K., is a defunct professional basketball club that was based in Turkey. The club was founded as a humble successor to the Turkish Basketball League club Ülker G.S.K., after the Ülker corporation, which owned and sponsored the club, decided to abolish it, and merge it with Fenerbahçe. Fenerbahçe then became known as Fenerbahçe Ülker.

== History ==
Alpella played in the final of the Turkish President's Cup against Efes Pilsen in 2006. They also played for 2 seasons in the top-tier Turkish Basketball League, in the 2006–07 and 2007–08 seasons. Finally, its league rights were bought by Trabzonspor, after the club was relegated down to the TB2L, following the 2007–08 season.

== Honours ==
- Turkish Presidential Cup

Runners-up (1): 2006
