= Azmi Turgut =

Turkish basketball player

Olin Edirne
- Position: Point guard
- League: Turkish Basketball League

Personal information
- Born: February 25, 1988 (age 38) Bodrum, Turkey
- Listed height: 6 ft 0 in (1.83 m)

Career information
- Playing career: 2006–present

Career history
- 2006–2007: Beşiktaş Cola Turka
- 2007–2008: Mutlu Akü Selçuk Üniversitesi
- 2008–2009: Beşiktaş Cola Turka
- 2010–2011: Darüşşafaka
- 2011–2012: Uşak Üniversitesi Belediyespor
- 2012: Erdemir
- 2013–present: Olin Edirne

Mehmet Azmi Turgut (born February 25, 1988) is a Turkish professional basketball player, who plays for Olin Edirne.
