= Caner Osman =

Turkish basketball coach and player

Yeşilgiresun Belediye
- Title: Assistant coach
- League: Basketbol Süper Ligi

Personal information
- Born: 12 July 1991 (age 35) Ohrid, Macedonia
- Listed height: 6 ft 4 in (1.93 m)
- Listed weight: 202 lb (92 kg)

Career information
- Playing career: 2009–2015
- Position: Small forward
- Coaching career: 2016–present

Career history

Playing
- 2009–2010: Anadolu Efes S.K.
- 2010–2011: Bosna Royal
- 2011–2012: Erdemirspor
- 2012–2013: Pertevniyal Basketbol Takımı
- 2013–2014: Strumica
- 2014–2015: Kumanovo

Coaching
- 2016–present: Yeşilgiresun Belediye (assistant)

Caner Osman (Macedonian: Џанер Осман; born 12 July 1991) is a Turkish coach and former professional basketball player. He is currently assistant coach of Aleksandar Trifunović in Yeşilgiresun Belediye. He last played for KK Kumanovo which competes in the Macedonian First League.

== Personal life ==
Osman was born in Ohrid, Macedonia (now North Macedonia), to a Turkish father and a Bosniak mother from Novi Pazar, Serbia. His brother, Cedi Osman, is also a professional basketball player.
