= Cedi Osman =

Turkish basketball player (born 1995)

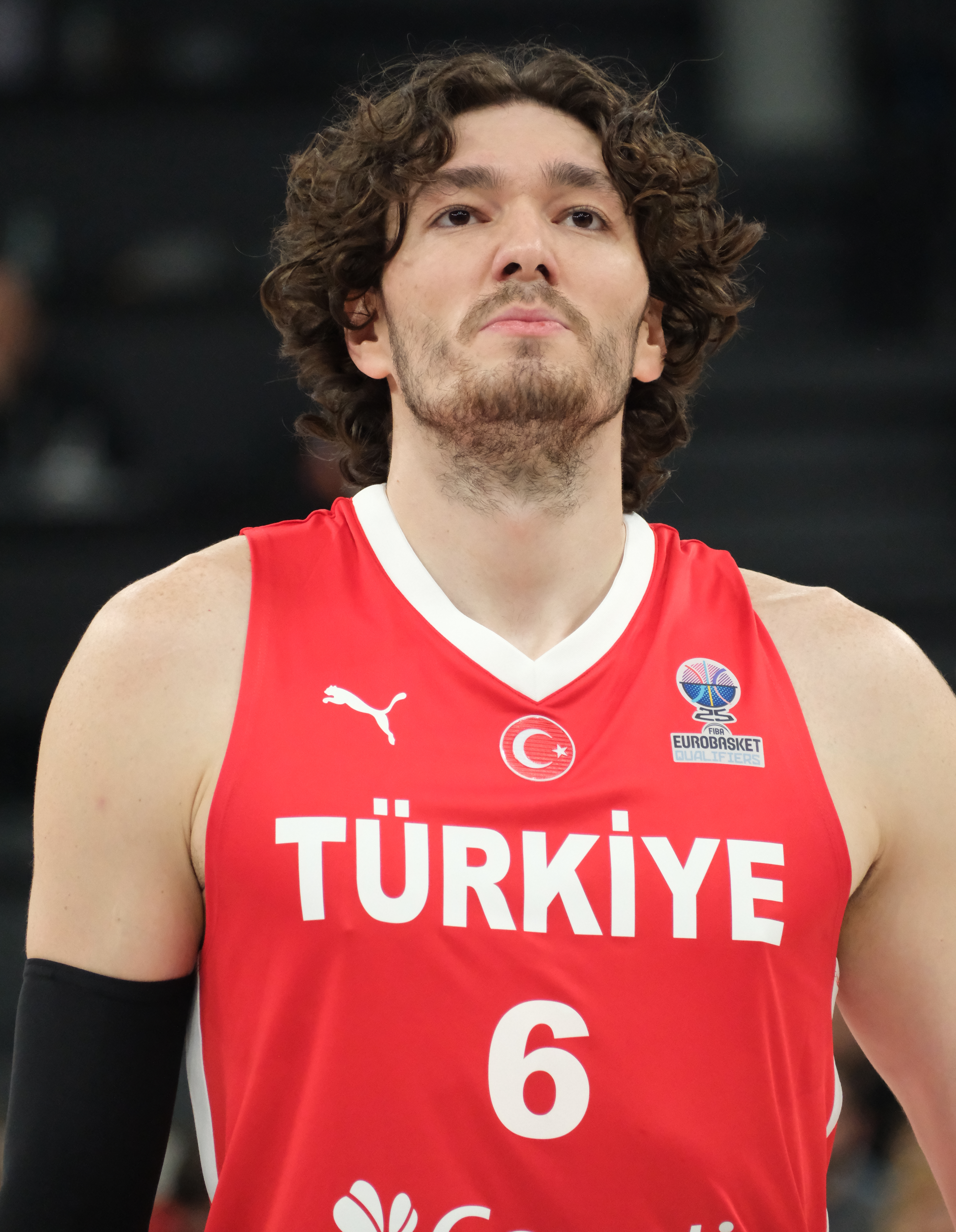
- Osman with the Turkey national team in 2025

No. 6 – PAOK Thessaloniki
- Position: Small forward
- League: Greek Basketball League; EuroCup

Personal information
- Born: 8 April 1995 (age 31) Ohrid, Macedonia
- Listed height: 2.07 m (6 ft 9 in)
- Listed weight: 230 lb (104 kg)

Career information
- NBA draft: 2015: 2nd round, 31st overall pick
- Drafted by: Minnesota Timberwolves
- Playing career: 2011–present

Career history
- 2011–2017: Anadolu Efes
- 2011–2013: →Pertevniyal
- 2017–2023: Cleveland Cavaliers
- 2017: →Canton Charge
- 2023–2024: San Antonio Spurs
- 2024–2026: Panathinaikos
- 2026–present: PAOK Thessaloniki

Career highlights
- Turkish Cup winner (2015); Turkish Supercup winner (2015); 2x Greek Cup winner (2025, 2026); 3× BSL All-Star (2015–2017); FIBA Europe Under-20 Championship MVP (2014); Albert Schweitzer Tournament Most Talented Player (2012)
- Stats at NBA.com
- Stats at Basketball Reference
Medals
Men's basketball
Representing Turkey
FIBA EuroBasket
Silver medal – second place	2025 Cyprus–Finland–Poland–Latvia
European U20 Championship
Gold medal – first place	2014 Greece	Team
European U18 Championship
Gold medal – first place	2013 Latvia	Team

Cedi Osman (Turkish pronunciation: [ˈdʒedi ˈosman]; born 8 April 1995) is a Turkish professional basketball player for PAOK Thessaloniki of the Greek Basketball League (GBL) and the EuroCup. He was drafted with the 31st pick in the 2015 NBA draft and played for the Cleveland Cavaliers and the San Antonio Spurs over the span of seven seasons. He plays at the small forward position.

== Early years ==
Osman was born in Ohrid, Republic of Macedonia (now North Macedonia) to a Turkish father and a Bosniak mother (from Novi Pazar, Serbia). He has an older brother, Caner, who is also a basketball player. He took up basketball in 2001, playing for KK RIN Family Sarajevo coached by legendary Rusmir Halilović, and KK Bosna's youth teams while attending elementary school in Sarajevo. Due to his paternal Turkish background, he became a Turkish citizen, as per Turkey's right-of-return laws. Since then, he has also represented the Turkey men's national basketball team.

== Professional career ==
=== Anadolu Efes (2011–2017) ===
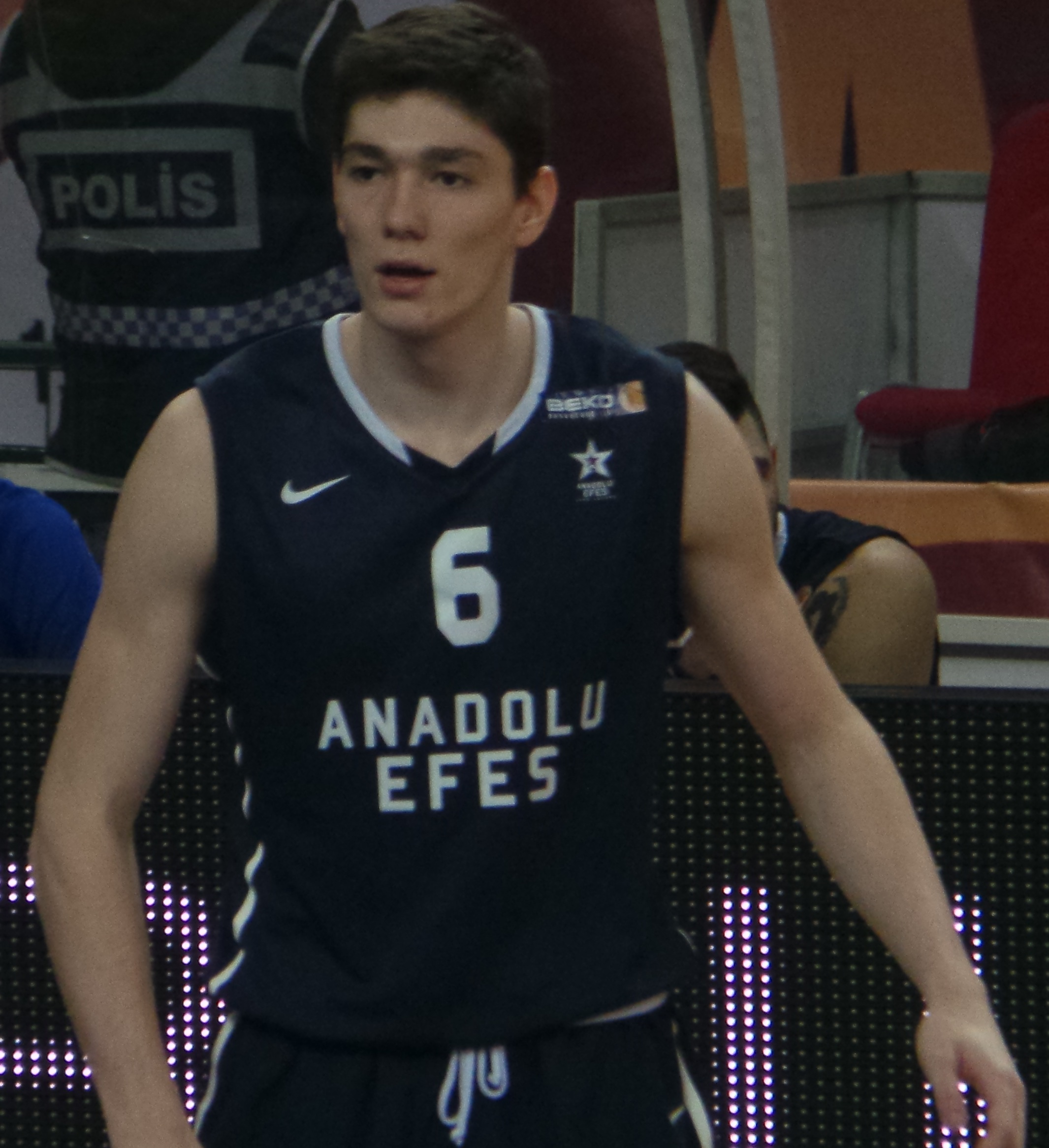
Osman with Efes in 2014

In 2007, Osman signed a youth team contract with Anadolu Efes after his outstanding performance at KK Bosna. He played for the junior, star, and youth teams of Anadolu Efes. He was loaned for the 2011–12 season to the Pertevniyal of the Turkish Basketball First League, which was at the time the farm team of Anadolu Efes. In the summer of 2012, Osman signed a professional contract with the Anadolu Efes senior team.

=== Cleveland Cavaliers (2017–2023) ===
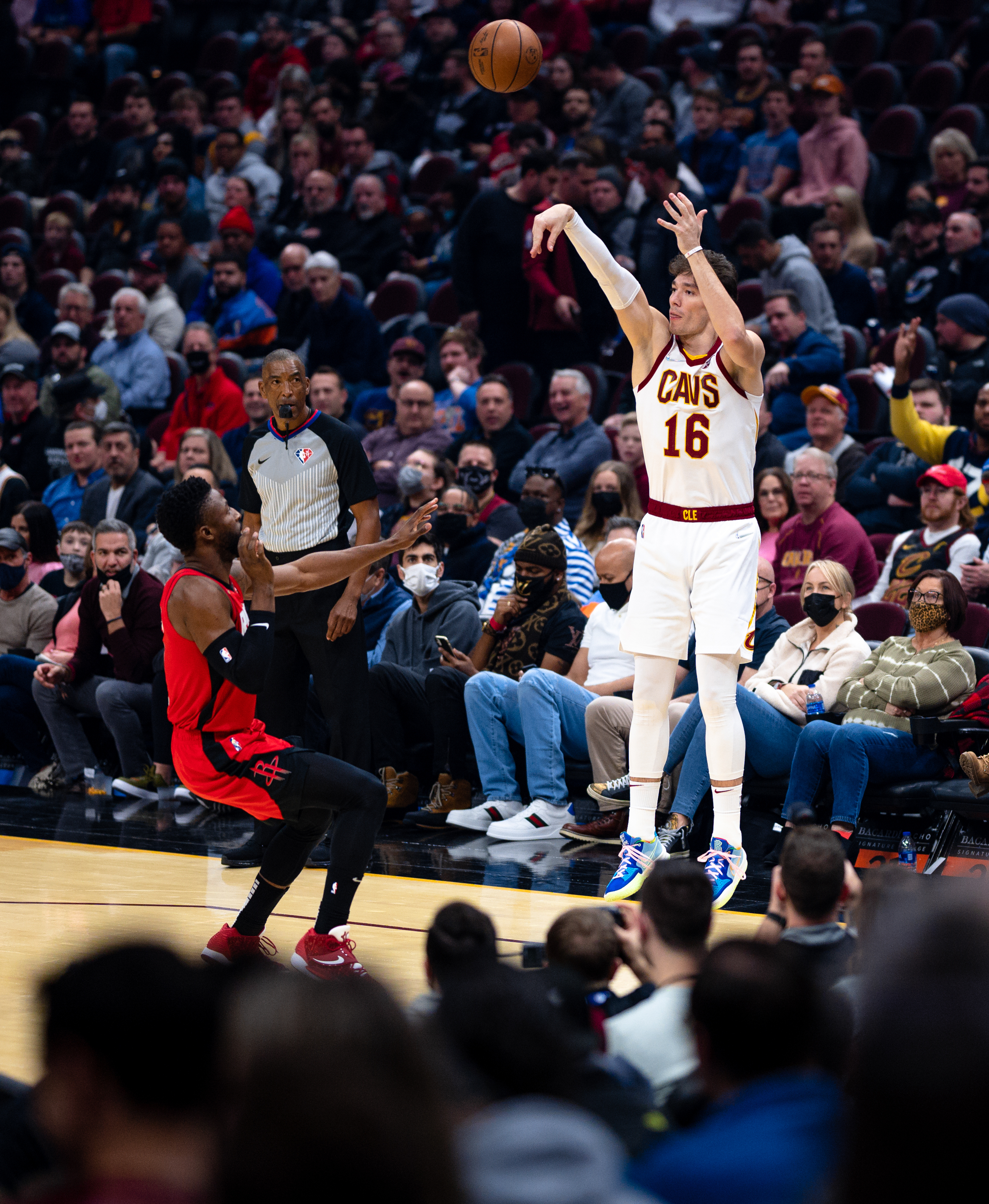
Osman shoots over David Nwaba during a game in 2021

On 25 June 2015, Osman was selected with the 31st overall pick in the 2015 NBA draft, by the Minnesota Timberwolves. His draft rights, along with those of Rakeem Christmas and a future draft pick, were then traded to the Cleveland Cavaliers, in exchange for the draft rights to Tyus Jones that same night.

On 18 July 2017, Osman signed with the Cleveland Cavaliers. On 9 February 2018, Osman played 38 minutes in a 123-107 Cavaliers victory over the Atlanta Hawks. He contributed 16 points on 6-of-9 shooting while notching 6 rebounds, 5 assists, and 3 steals. The Cavaliers made it to the 2018 NBA Finals, but lost 4–0 to the Golden State Warriors.

On 25 January 2019, in a 100–94 loss to the Miami Heat, Osman scored a career-high 29 points. Four days later, Osman was named a participant for the 2019 Rising Stars Challenge as a member of the World Team.

On 26 October 2019 Osman signed a contract extension with the Cavaliers. On 22 March 2022 Osman recorded his 500th 3 pointer as a member of the Cavaliers. This made him just the 9th Cavaliers player ever to join the 500+ 3 point club.

=== San Antonio Spurs (2023–2024) ===
On 6 July 2023 Osman was traded to the San Antonio Spurs as part of a three-team trade with the Miami Heat and Cleveland Cavaliers.

=== Panathinaikos (2024–2026) ===
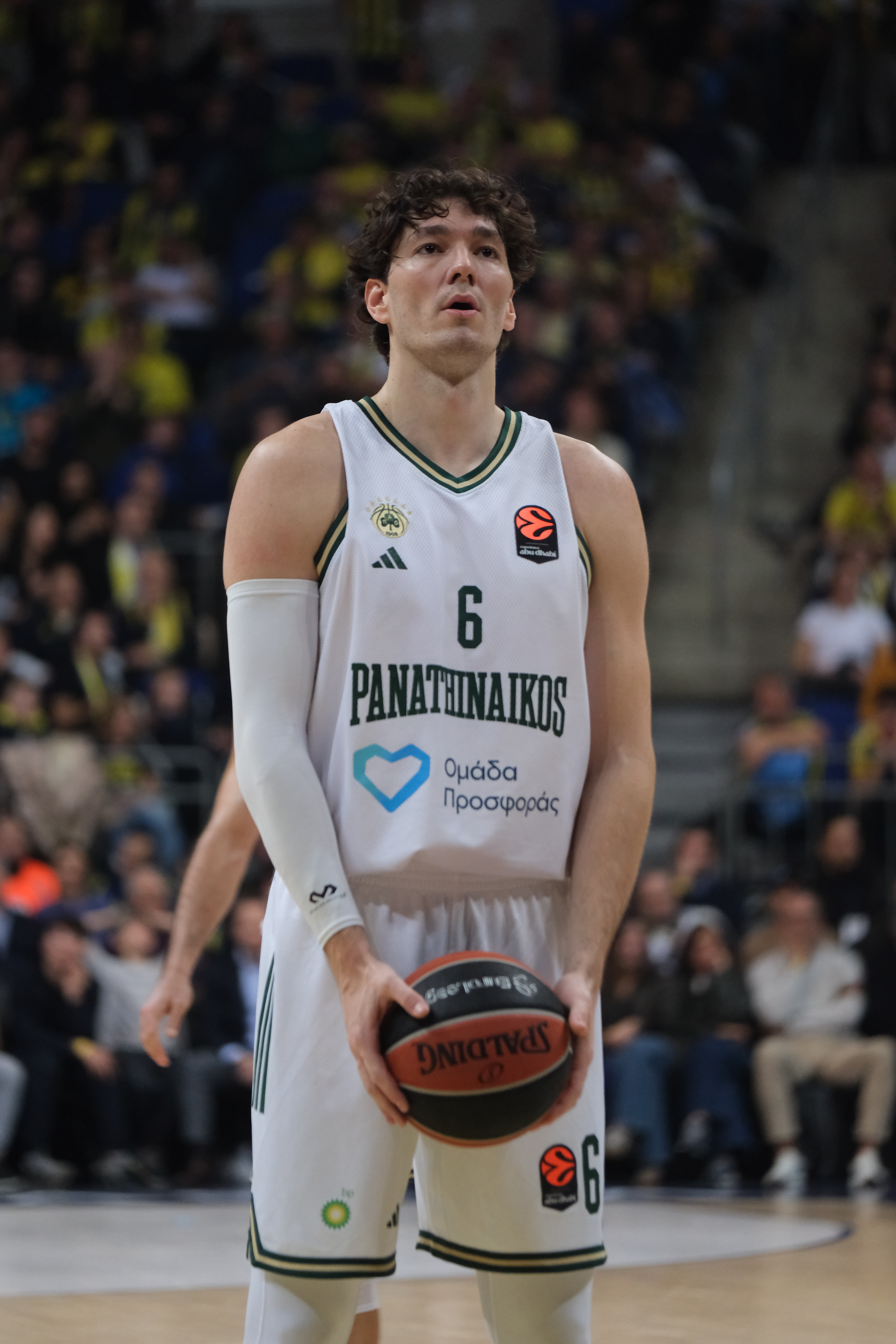
Osman with Panathinaikos in 2025

On 7 September 2024 Osman signed a one-year deal with the reigning EuroLeague and Greek League champions Panathinaikos. On 9 April 2025, Osman agreed upon a two-year contract extension with the defending EuroLeague champions, worth 3.3 million euros. On April 15 of the same year, the deal was made official.

On May 6, 2025, Osman was the deciding player in Panathinaikos' quarterfinal game 5 75-67 win over Anadolu Efes, scoring 28 points, more than a third of his team's total tally, and collected 8 rebounds.

On March 14, 2026, he was named the Most Valuable Player for Round 31 of the 2025-2026 EuroLeague Regular Season. He had 24 points, 5 rebounds, 3 assists, and 2 steals.

=== PAOK (2026–present) ===
On July 20, 2026, Osman signed a three–year deal with PAOK Thessaloniki of the Greek Basketball League (GBL).

== National team career ==
=== Junior national team ===
Osman was a member of the junior national teams of Turkey. He played at the following tournaments with Turkey's junior national teams: the 2011 FIBA Europe Under-16 Championship, the 2012 FIBA Europe Under-18 Championship, the 2012 Albert Schweitzer Tournament, where he won a bronze medal and was named the Most Talented Player, the 2013 FIBA Europe Under-18 Championship, where he won a gold medal, and at the 2014 FIBA Europe Under-20 Championship, where he also won a gold medal, and was named to the All-Tournament Team and selected as the MVP.

=== Senior national team ===
After playing with the junior national teams of Turkey, Osman became a member of the senior men's Turkish national basketball team. With Turkey's senior national team, he has played at the 2014 FIBA Basketball World Cup, EuroBasket 2015, 2016 Manila FIBA World Olympic Qualifying Tournament, EuroBasket 2017, 2019 FIBA Basketball World Cup, EuroBasket 2022, and EuroBasket 2025.

Lastly, he was the captain of the Turkish National Team in the EuroBasket 2025 and was one of the noteworthy players of the tournament. Cedi Osman made 29 successful three-points shots and became the tournament's top three-point shooter, was also selected for the "All-Star Second" team. He finished the tournament with an average of 16 points per game. While playing the entire of the final game against Germany, he scored 23 points, but couldn't prevent the loss Turkey.

== Career statistics ==
Legend
GP	Games played	GS	Games started	MPG	Minutes per game
FG%	Field-goal percentage	3P%	3-point field-goal percentage	FT%	Free-throw percentage
RPG	Rebounds per game	APG	Assists per game	SPG	Steals per game
BPG	Blocks per game	PPG	Points per game	PIR	Performance index rating
**Bold**	Career high

=== NBA ===
==== Regular season ====
Year	Team	GP	GS	MPG	FG%	3P%	FT%	RPG	APG	SPG	BPG	PPG
2017–18	Cleveland	61	12	11.0	**.484**	.368	.565	2.0	.7	.4	.0	3.9
2018–19	Cleveland	76	**75**	**32.2**	.427	.348	.779	**4.7**	2.6	.8	.1	**13.0**
2019–20	Cleveland	65	65	29.4	.437	.383	.670	3.6	2.4	.8	**.2**	11.0
2020–21	Cleveland	59	26	25.6	.374	.306	**.800**	3.4	**2.9**	**.9**	**.2**	10.4
2021–22	Cleveland	66	3	22.1	.432	.357	.664	2.2	2.0	.8	**.2**	10.7
2022–23	Cleveland	**77**	2	20.1	.451	.372	.694	2.3	1.5	.5	.1	8.7
2023–24	San Antonio	72	3	17.6	.479	**.389**	.673	2.5	1.7	.5	.2	6.8
Career		476	186	22.7	.432	.357	.711	3.0	2.0	.7	.1	9.3

==== Playoffs ====
Year	Team	GP	GS	MPG	FG%	3P%	FT%	RPG	APG	SPG	BPG	PPG
2018	Cleveland	**14**	0	4.4	.333	.143	.250	.5	.2	.2	.0	1.0
2023	Cleveland	5	0	**18.6**	**.360**	**.300**	**.667**	**3.0**	**1.0**	**.4**	**.2**	**6.0**
Career		19	0	8.2	.349	.259	.538	1.2	.4	.3	.1	2.3

=== EuroLeague ===
Year	Team	GP	GS	MPG	FG%	3P%	FT%	RPG	APG	SPG	BPG	PPG	PIR
2013–14	Anadolu Efes	13	0	11.6	.436	**.524**	.400	1.7	.9	.5	.1	3.8	3.5
2014–15	Anadolu Efes	27	7	19.3	.397	.303	.667	**3.7**	1.1	.7	.3	6.7	6.7
2015–16	Anadolu Efes	23	12	20.0	.441	.380	.763	3.1	.7	**.9**	.1	7.9	8.1
2016–17	Anadolu Efes	35	**34**	18.6	.409	.340	.787	2.8	.8	.6	.1	7.1	6.3
2024–25	Panathinaikos	**39**	22	19.5	**.552**	.377	.791	2.7	.7	.5	**.4**	9.6	8.5
2025–26	Panathinaikos	**39**	**34**	**27.3**	.470	.381	**.819**	3.5	**1.2**	.7	.3	**12.9**	**12.7**
Career		176	109	20.3	.441	.368	.771	3.0	.9	.6	.1	8.7	8.3

== Personal life ==
Osman became engaged to Ebru Şahin, a Turkish actress in September 2021. They married in July 2022.
