= Ceyhun Altay =

Turkish basketball player (born 1986)

Free agent
- Position: Shooting guard / small forward

Personal information
- Born: August 15, 1986 (age 40) Istanbul, Turkey
- Listed height: 6 ft 5 in (1.96 m)
- Listed weight: 192 lb (87 kg)

Career information
- Playing career: 2002–present

Career history
- 2002–2008: Darüşşafaka
- 2008–2010: Aliağa Petkim
- 2010–2013: Türk Telekom
- 2013–2014: Aliağa Petkim
- 2014–2015: Pınar Karşıyaka
- 2015–2017: Büyükçekmece Basketbol

Ceyhun Altay (born August 15, 1986) is a Turkish professional basketball player who last played as a swingman for Büyükçekmece Basketbol of the Turkish Basketball League.
