= 2009–10 Turkish Basketball League =

2009-10 Turkish Basketball League
- League: Turkish Basketball League
- Sport: Basketball
- Games: 240 (regular season)
- Teams: 16
- Total attendance: 387,568
- Average attendance: 1,474
- TV partner: Lig TV

Regular Season

TBL Finals
- Finals MVP: (United States) Tarence Kinsey

TBL seasons
- ← 2008–09 2010–11 →

The 2009–10 Turkish Basketball League was the 44th season of the top professional basketball league in Turkey. The regular season leaders were Efes Pilsen, but Fenerbahçe Ülker defeated them in the play-offs 4–2.

== Regular season standings ==
Clinches Play-off berth
Eliminated from the Play-offs
Relegated

Pos	Club	Pld	W	L	PF	PA	Pts
1	Efes Pilsen	30	27	3	2617	2168	57
2	Fenerbahçe Ülker	30	23	7	2473	2209	53
3	Banvitspor	30	20	10	2347	2208	50
4	Beşiktaş Cola Turka	30	18	12	2614	2433	48
5	Türk Telekomspor	30	18	12	2472	2368	48
6	Pınar Karşıyaka	30	16	14	2386	2322	46
7	Bornova Belediye	30	14	16	2309	2441	44
8	Erdemirspor	30	13	17	2402	2435	43
9	Galatasaray Cafe Crown	30	17	13	2117	2046	42
10	Tofaş S.K.	30	12	18	2205	2344	42
11	Antalya BB	30	12	18	2210	2371	42
12	Mersin BB	30	12	18	2291	2383	42
13	Aliağa Petkim	30	11	19	2404	2571	41
14	Oyak Renault	30	11	19	2210	2361	41
15	Kepez Belediyespor	30	10	20	2105	2286	40
16	Darüşşafaka Cooper Tires	30	6	24	2115	2331	36

== Playoffs ==
Quarter Finals
1	Efes Pilsen	3
8	Erdemirspor	0
4	Beşiktaş Cola Turka	3
5	Türk Telekom	1
2	Fenerbahçe Ülker	3
7	Bornova Belediye	0
3	Banvit	3
6	Pınar Karşıyaka	1

SemiFinals
1	Efes Pilsen	3
4	Beşiktaş Cola Turka	0
2	Fenerbahçe Ülker	1
3	Banvit	0

Finals
1	Efes Pilsen	2
3	Fenerbahçe Ülker	4
