= Erdemirspor =

- Founded: 2000
- Dissolved: 2013
- History: Erdemirspor (2000–2013)
- Arena: Erdemir Sport Hall
- Capacity: 2,000
- Location: Zonguldak, Turkey
- Team colors: Red and White
- President: Oğuz Nuri Özgen
- Head coach: Özhan Çivgin
- Website: erdemirspor.net
Home	Away

Erdemir Spor Kulübü, also referred to as Erdemirspor or Erdemir Zonguldak, is a professional basketball team based in the city of Zonguldak in Turkey that plays in the Turkish Basketball League. The team was founded in 2000. Their home arena is the Erdemir Sport Hall with a capacity of 1,700 seats.

The team sponsored by Erdemir. It is a Turkish steel producer.

== Season by season ==
Season	Tier	League	Pos.	Postseason	Turkish Cup	European Competitions
2000–01	2	TB2L	2	–	–	-
2001–02	2	TB2L	1	Promotion playoffs	–	-
2002–03	2	TB2L	1	Promotion playoffs	–	-
2003–04	2	TB2L	2	Promoted^{2rd}	–	-
2004–05	1	TBL	9	–	–	-
2005–06	1	TBL	15	Relegated	Group Stage	-
2006–07	2	TB2L	1	Final Stage	–	-
2007–08	2	TB2L	2	Promoted^{Champion}	–	-
2008–09	1	TBL	11	–	Runner-up	-
2009–10	1	TBL	8	Quarterfinalist	Group Stage	-
2010–11	1	TBL	12	–	Group Stage	-
2011–12	1	TBL	11	–	Group Stage	-
2012–13	1	TBL	10	_	Group Stage	-

== Current roster ==
Note: Flags indicate national team eligibility at FIBA-sanctioned events. Players may hold other non-FIBA nationalities not displayed.

Erdemir Zonguldak roster
Players
Coaches

Pos.	No.	Nat.	Name	Ht.	Wt.	Age
PG	4	(Turkey)	Eroğlu, Erbil	1.94 m (6 ft 4 in)	85 kg (187 lb)	33 – 21 January 1993
C	5	(Turkey)	Pars, Asım	2.10 m (6 ft 11 in)	105 kg (231 lb)	50 – 1 April 1976
SF	7	(Turkey)	Osman, Caner	1.94 m (6 ft 4 in)	91 kg (201 lb)	35 – 12 July 1991
PG	8	(Turkey)	Turgut, Azmi	1.92 m (6 ft 4 in)	86 kg (190 lb)	38 – 25 February 1988
SG	9	(United States)	Henderson, Gerrod	1.93 m (6 ft 4 in)	93 kg (205 lb)	48 – 30 October 1978
SG	10	(Turkey)	Mahmutoğlu, Melih	1.91 m (6 ft 3 in)	85 kg (187 lb)	36 – 12 May 1990
SG	11	(Turkey)	Özcan, Barış	1.92 m (6 ft 4 in)	93 kg (205 lb)	46 – 21 June 1980
C	12	(Turkey)	Bayav, Emre	2.12 m (6 ft 11 in)	102 kg (225 lb)	39 – 14 July 1987
F	14	(Turkey)	Özcan, Can	2.02 m (6 ft 8 in)	98 kg (216 lb)	37 – 16 April 1989
PF	15	(Slovenia)	Balažič, Jure	2.04 m (6 ft 8 in)	104 kg (229 lb)	46 – 12 September 1980
SF	21	(Turkey)	Yıldırım, Nusret	2.00 m (6 ft 7 in)	95 kg (209 lb)	37 – 27 April 1989
SF	23	(United States)	Marshall, Sean	1.98 m (6 ft 6 in)	95 kg (209 lb)	41 – 11 March 1985
PG	51	(Turkey)	Özcan, Alper	1.88 m (6 ft 2 in)	81 kg (179 lb)	37 – 15 August 1989

Head coach

- (Turkey) Özhan Çıvgın

Assistant coach(es)

- (Turkey) Servet Özsüner

Legend

- (C) Team captain
- Injured

- Roster
Updated: December 2, 2012

== Notable players ==
- (Turkey) Erdal Bibo
- (Turkey) Erkan Veyseloğlu
- (Turkey) Hakan Demirel
- (Turkey) Hakan Köseoğlu
- (France) - (Ivory Coast) Mohamed Kone
- (New Zealand) Mark Dickel
- (United States) - (Lebanon) Antwain Barbour
- (United States) Dewayne Jefferson
- (United States) James Thomas
- (United States) K'zell Wesson
- (United States) - (Belize) Leon Williams
- (United States) Nate Funk
- (United States) Tremmell Darden
