= Mersin Büyükşehir Belediyesi S.K. =

Mersin Büyükşehir Belediyesi
- Leagues: TBL
- Founded: 1993
- Dissolved: 2018
- History: Mersin BB (1993 – 2018)
- Arena: Edip Buran Arena; Servet Tazegül Arena
- Capacity: 1,750 (2005–2013, 2014–2018); 7,500 (2013–14)
- Location: Mersin, Turkey
- Team colors: Orange and Navy
- Website: Mersin Büyükşehir Belediyesi

Mersin Büyükşehir Belediyesi SK (English: Mersin Metropolitan Municipality Sports Club), also known simply as Mersin BB, was a professional basketball team based in the city of Mersin in Turkey. Their home arena was the Edip Buran Arena with a capacity of 1,750 seats. The team played in the Turkish Basketball First League (TBL) before it dissolved in 2018.

== History ==
Mersin Büyükşehir Belediyesi was founded in 1993. The team was promoted to the Turkish Basketball League from the Turkish Second Basketball League for the 2005–06 season. After spending nine years in the top league, the team was relegated to the TB2L following the 2013–14 season. Following the 2017–18 season, the team ceased operations.

== Season by season ==
Season	Tier	League	Pos.	Postseason	Turkish Cup	European Competitions
2004–05	2	TB2L	3	Promoted^{Champion}	–	–
2005–06	1	TBL	14	–	Quarterfinalist	–
2006–07	1	TBL	9	–	Group Stage	–
2007–08	1	TBL	10	–	Group Stage	–
2008–09	1	TBL	7	Quarterfinalist	Group stage	–
2009–10	1	TBL	12	–	Runner-up	–
2010–11	1	TBL	13	–	Group Stage	–
2011–12	1	TBL	10	–	Group Stage	–
2012–13	1	TBL	12	–	Group Stage	–
2013–14	1	TBL	15	Relegated	Group Stage	–
2014–15	2	TB2L	18	Relegated	–	–
2015–16	3	TB3L				–

== Notable players ==
- (Turkey) Harun Erdenay
- (Turkey) Nedim Yücel
- (Turkey) Ümit Sonkol
- (Jamaica) Kimani Ffriend
- (North Macedonia) Predrag Samardžiski
- (United States) Alex Scales
- (United States) - (North Macedonia) Bo McCalebb
- (United States) Dionte Christmas
- (United States) Chris Lofton
- (United States) David Holston
- (United States) Dominic James
- (United States) Ryan Sidney
- (United States) Gerald Fitch
- (United States) Jerry Johnson
- (United States) (Turkey) Michael Wright

== See also ==
- Mersin Büyükşehir Belediyesi S.K. Women's Basketball
