= Ankara Atatürk Sport Hall =

Indoor sport arena in Ankara, Turkey

Coordinates: 39°56′25.18″N 32°50′55.14″E

Ankara Atatürk Sport Hall (Turkish: Ankara Atatürk Spor Salonu) is an indoor sport arena located in the district of Ulus in Ankara, Turkey. The hall with a seating capacity for 4,500 people and a parking lot for 500 cars was built in 1969.
