= Dilek Sabancı Sport Hall =

Indoor sporting arena in Antalya, Turkey

- Interactive map of Dilek Sabancı Sport Hall
- Location: Antalya, Turkey
- Coordinates: 36.88820°N 30.66928°E
- Owner: Sabancı Foundation
- Capacity: 2,500

Construction
- Opened: November 3, 2001; 24 years ago

Tenants
- Antalya Büyükşehir Belediyesi; Kepez Belediyespor

Dilek Sabancı Sport Hall (Turkish: Dilek Sabancı Spor Salonu) was an indoor sporting arena located in Antalya, Turkey. Owned by the Sabancı Foundation, it was opened on November 3, 2001.

The capacity of the arena was 2,500 spectators. It was the home of Turkish Basketball League clubs, Antalya Büyükşehir Belediyesi and Kepez Belediyespor. The arena was demolished in June 2013 due to construction of New Antalya Stadium, and replaced by a new arena originally being built for the 2010 FIBA World Championship, Antalya Arena.

== International events hosted ==
- 13th European Wushu Championships, March 6–13, 2010

== See also ==
- List of indoor arenas in Turkey
