= Antalya Büyükşehir Belediyesi =

- Leagues: Turkish Basketball Second League
- Founded: 1995; 30 years ago
- History: Antalya BB (1995–present)
- Arena: Dilek Sabancı Sport Hall
- Capacity: 2,500
- Location: Antalya, Turkey
- Team colors: Orange and Navy
- President: Recep Tokgöz
- Head coach: Timuçin Meriç
- Website: Antalya BB Basketball
| Home | Away |

Antalya Büyükşehir Belediyesi Spor Kulübü (English: Antalya Greater Metropolitan Municipality Sports Club), commonly abbreviated as Antalya BB is a basketball team based in the city of Antalya in Turkey. Their home arena is the Dilek Sabancı Sport Hall with a capacity of 2,500 seats.

== History ==
It was founded first as Antalyaspor in 1966. It played in First League between 1993 and 1996. It qualified to play-offs in 1994–1995 season after finishing 6th with 17 wins. It 3–1 defeated Meysuspor at 1st round but was eliminated by Tofaş SAS by 3–0 at quarter final. It was renamed as Muratpaşa Belediyespor in 1996–1997 season and returned to First League in 1997. Muratpaşa Belediyespor played the league between 1997 and 1999. It merged with basketball branch of Antbirlik (founded in 1978), who played First League between 1981–1982 and 1994–1996. It also played in 2000–2001 season as Muratpaşa Belediyespor Antbirlik. It took present name in 2002 and was promoted to First League as champions of final group in 2006–2007 season. It finished 6th with 18 wins and qualified to play-offs but was eliminated by Fenerbahçe Ülker as 3–1 in 2007–2008 season. It finished again 6th and qualified to play-offs but was eliminated by again Fenerbahçe Ülker as 3–0 in 2008–2009 season.

== Season by season ==
| Season | Tier | League | Pos. | Turkish Cup | European competitions | |
|---|---|---|---|---|---|---|
| 1999–00 | 2 | TB2L | 4th | | | |
| 2000–01 | 2 | TB2L | 9th | | | |
| 2001–04 | 3 | EBBL | | | | |
| 2004–05 | 2 | TB2L | 8th | | | |
| 2005–06 | 3 | EBBL | 1st | | | |
| 2006–07 | 2 | TB2L | 1st | | | |
| 2007–08 | 1 | TBL | 6th | Group Stage | | |
| 2008–09 | 1 | TBL | 6th | Quarterfinalist | 3 EuroChallenge | QR2 |
| 2009–10 | 1 | TBL | 11th | Group Stage | | |
| 2010–11 | 1 | TBL | 8th | Group Stage | | |
| 2011–12 | 1 | TBL | 13th | Quarterfinalist | | |
| 2012–13 | 1 | TBL | 16th | Group Stage | | |
| 2013–14 | 2 | TB2L | 15th | | | |
| 2013–14 | 3 | TB3L | | | | |
| 2015–16 | 3 | TB3L | | | | |
| 2016–17 | 3 | TB2L | 1st | | | |

== Notable players ==
Note: Flags indicate national team eligibility at FIBA-sanctioned events. Players may hold other non-FIBA nationalities not displayed.

Criteria

To appear in this section a player must have either:

- Set a club record or won an individual award while at the club
- Played at least one official international match for their national team at any time
- Played at least one official NBA match at any time.

- (Turkey) Barış Hersek
- (Turkey) Bora Paçun
- (Turkey) Can Akın
- (Turkey) Melih Mahmutoğlu
- (Turkey) Muratcan Güler
- (Turkey) Nedim Yücel
- (Azerbaijan) Rasim Başak
- (Germany) Patrick Femerling
- (Kosovo) Yll Kaçaniku
- (Latvia) Kristaps Valters
- (Philippines) Marcus Douthit
- (Serbia) Stevan Jelovac
- (United States) Aaron Jackson
- (United States) Corey Fisher
- (United States) Frank Elegar
- (United States) Jamon Gordon
- (United States) Marcus Douthit
- (United States) Mike Green
- (United States) Patrick Christopher
- (United States) Ralph Mims
- (United States) Ricardo Marsh
- (United States) Cartier Martin
- (United States) Jermareo Davidson
- (United States) Jordan Theodore
- (United States) Stacey King
