= Mimar Sinan Sport Hall =

Multi-purpose sport venue in Edirne, Turkey

Mimar Sinan Sport Hall Mimar Sinan Spor Salonu
- Interactive map of Mimar Sinan Sport Hall; Mimar Sinan Spor Salonu
- Location: Edirne, Turkey
- Coordinates: 41.6676°N 26.5726°E
- Capacity: 2,000

Construction
- Opened: 1971; 55 years ago

Tenant
- Olin Edirne

Mimar Sinan Sport Hall (Turkish: Mimar Sinan Spor Salonu) is an indoor multi-purpose sport venue that is located in the Edirne, Turkey. Opened in 1971, the hall has a seating capacity of 2,000 spectators. It was previously home to Olin Edirne.
