= Bornova Belediyespor =

Turkish basketball club

Bornova Belediyesi
- Leagues: TBL
- Founded: 1986
- Arena: Halkapınar Sport Hall
- Capacity: 10,000
- Location: Bornova, İzmir
- Team colors: Green, Black and White
- President: (Turkey) Kamil Okyay Sındır
- Head coach: (Turkey) Aclan Kavasoglu

Bornova Belediyespor is a basketball club based in Bornova district of İzmir, Turkey that plays in the Turkish Basketball First League (TBL) since 2009–2010 season. Their home arena is the Halkapınar Sport Hall.
