= Erdemir Sport Hall =

Erdemir Sport Hall Erdemir Spor Salonu
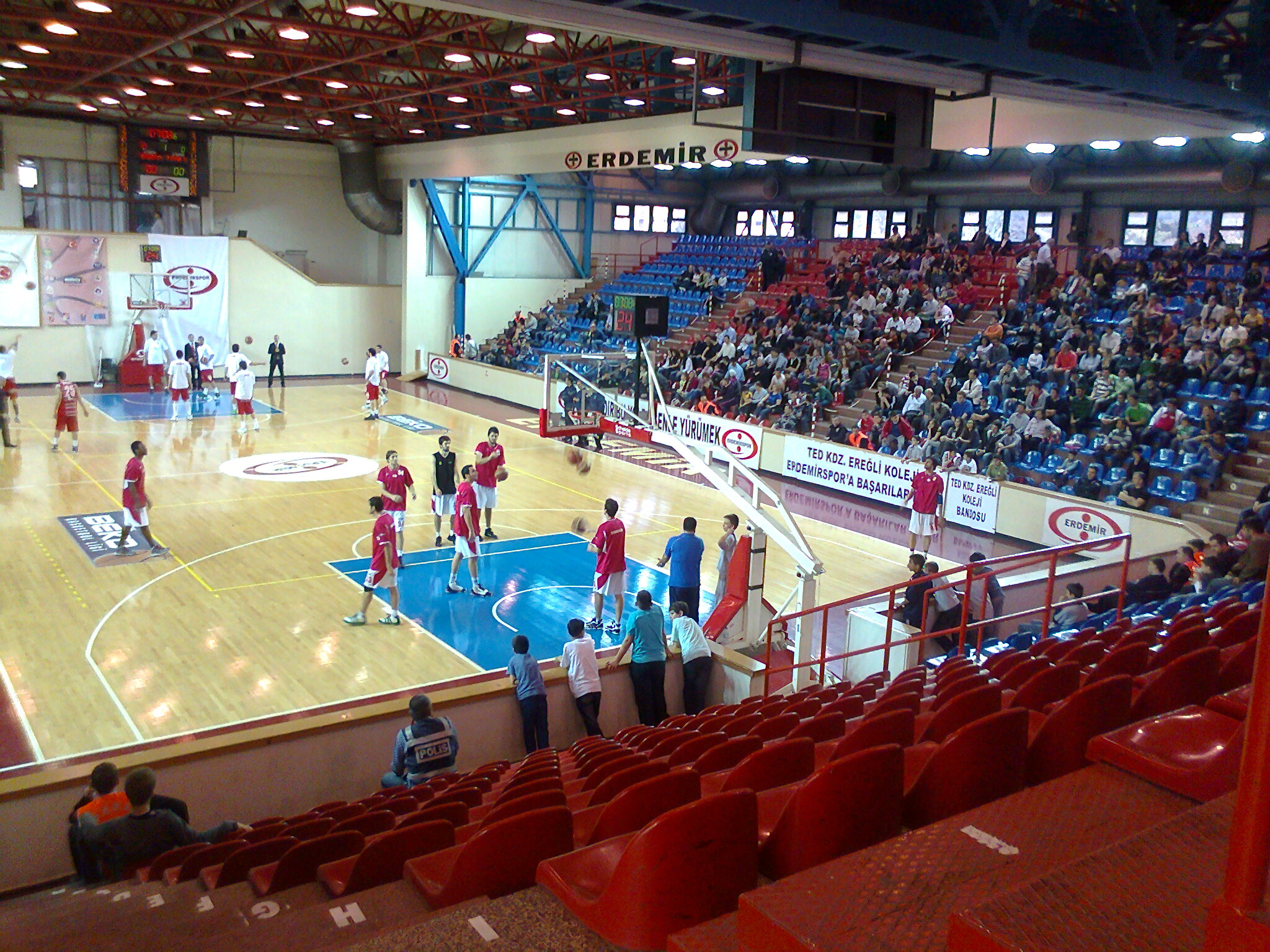
- Interactive map of Erdemir Sport Hall; Erdemir Spor Salonu
- Location: Karadeniz Ereğli, Zonguldak Province, Turkey
- Coordinates: 41.27313°N 31.42605°E
- Owner: Erdemir
- Capacity: 2,000

Tenant
- Erdemir SK

Erdemir Sport Hall (Turkish: Erdemir Spor Salonu) is a multi-purpose indoor sport venue located in the Karadeniz Ereğli town of Zonguldak Province, Turkey. The hall has a seating capacity of 2,000 spectators.

The sport hall was built and is owned by Turkey's major steel producing company Erdemir. It is home to the volleyball and basketball teams of Erdemir SK, which is sponsored by Erdemir. The basketball team plays currently in the Turkish Basketball League.
