= Basketbol Süper Ligi Finals MVP =

Turkish basketball award

The Basketbol Süper Ligi Finals MVP (English: Basketball Super League Finals MVP), is an annual basketball award that is presented to the most valuable player of the finals of the playoffs of the Türkiye Basketbol Süper Ligi (English: Turkish Basketball Super League), which is the top-tier level professional club basketball league in Turkey.

== Award winners ==
- Player nationalities by national team.

Basketbol Süper Ligi Finals MVP
Season	Finals MVP	Position	Nationality	Club	Ref.
2008–09	Bootsy Thornton	SG	United States	Efes Pilsen	
2009–10	Tarence Kinsey	SF	United States	Fenerbahçe	
2010–11	Oğuz Savaş	C	Turkey	Fenerbahçe	
2011–12	Carlos Arroyo	PG	Puerto Rico	Beşiktaş	
2012–13	Jamont Gordon	SG	United States	Galatasaray	
2013–14	No MVP ^{1}				
2014–15	Bobby Dixon	PG	Turkey	Karşıyaka	
2015–16	Luigi Datome	SF	Italy	Fenerbahçe	
2016–17	Bogdan Bogdanović	SG	Serbia	Fenerbahçe	
2017–18	Brad Wanamaker	SG	United States	Fenerbahçe	
2018–19	Shane Larkin	PG	Turkey	Anadolu Efes	
2019–20	Not awarded ^{2}				
2020–21	Rodrigue Beaubois	SG	France	Anadolu Efes	
2021–22	Jan Veselý	C	Czech Republic	Fenerbahçe	
2022–23	Vasilije Micić	PG / SG	Serbia	Anadolu Efes	
2023–24	Nigel Hayes-Davis	SF / PF	United States	Fenerbahçe	
2024–25	Khem Birch	C	Canada	Fenerbahçe	
2025–26	Wade Baldwin	SG	United States	Fenerbahçe	

^1 There was no Finals MVP in the 2014 Turkish League Playoffs, because the last game of the Finals was boycotted by Galatasaray, over a dispute having to do with the referee assignments for game 7 of the series.
^2 There was no awarding in the 2019–20 season, because the season was cancelled due to the coronavirus pandemic in Turkey.

== Multiple honors ==
=== Player nationality ===
Rank	Country	Total
1.	United States	6
2.	Turkey	3
3.	Serbia	2
4.	Canada	1
4.	Czech Republic	1
4.	France	1
4.	Italy	1
4.	Puerto Rico	1

=== Teams ===
Rank	Team	Total
1.	Fenerbahçe	9
2.	Anadolu Efes	4
3.	Beşiktaş	1
3.	Galatasaray	1
3.	Karşıyaka	1

== See also ==
- Basketbol Süper Ligi Mr. King
