= Bursa Atatürk Sport Hall =

Indoor sport venue in Bursa, Turkey

Bursa Atatürk Sport Hall Bursa Atatürk Spor Salonu
- Interactive map of Bursa Atatürk Sport Hall; Bursa Atatürk Spor Salonu
- Location: Altıparmak, Osmangazi, Bursa, Turkey
- Coordinates: 40.19423°N 29.04839°E
- Capacity: 3,000

Construction
- Opened: 1972; 54 years ago

Tenants
- Bursaspor Basketbol (2014–present); Oyak Renault Basketball, Yeşim Basketball, Uludağ Üniversitesi SK

Bursa Atatürk Sport Hall (Turkish: Bursa Atatürk Spor Salonu) is a multi-purpose indoor sport venue located in the district of Altıparmak, Osmangazi in Bursa, Turkey. The hall, with a capacity for 3,000 people, was built in 1972.

Home of four clubs Bursaspor Basketbol, Oyak Renault Basketball, Yeşim SK and Uludağ Üniversitesi SK, it is the biggest indoor sport hall in Bursa, where competitions of basketball, volleyball and handball are held.

Bursa Atatürk Sport Hall hosted 15 games of the Group A in the preliminary round of the Eurobasket 2005 Women between September 2 and 7 2005.
