= Enka Sport Hall =

Multi-purpose sport venue in Aliağa, İzmir, Turkey

Enka Sport Hall Enka Spor Salonu
- Interactive map of Enka Sport Hall; Enka Spor Salonu
- Location: Aliağa, İzmir Province, Turkey
- Coordinates: 38.79485°N 26.96527°E
- Owner: Aliağa Municipality
- Capacity: Basketball: 2,500

Construction
- Opened: 2003; 23 years ago

Tenant
- Aliağa Petkim

Enka Sport Hall (Turkish: Enka Spor Salonu) is an indoor multi-purpose sport venue that is located in Aliağa, İzmir Province, Turkey. The hall has a seating capacity of 2,500 spectators.

The sport hall was built by Enka Foundation and donated to Aliağa Municipality. Opened in 2003, it is home to wrestling and basketball branches of the Aliağa Youth and Sports Club. The basketball team of the club plays currently in the Turkish Basketball League.
