= Aliağa Petkim =

- Founded: 1993
- Dissolved: 2014
- History: Aliağa Petkim (1993–2014)
- Arena: Enka Sport Hall
- Capacity: 2,500
- Location: İzmir, Turkey
- Website: www.aliagaspor.org.tr
Home	Away

Aliağa Gençlik S.K., known as Aliağa Petkim for sponsorship reasons, was a professional basketball team from the district of Aliağa in İzmir, Turkey. Their home arena was the Enka Sport Hall with a capacity of 2,500 seats. The team competes playing in the Turkish Basketball League.

== History ==
Aliağa Petkim was established in 1993, and continued playing in the ranks of TB2L until in 2008-09 season. The team was promoted to the Turkish Basketball League after finishing second position in the TB2L in 2008.

In the 2012–13 season, the team played in the EuroChallenge Qualifying Round. Here it lost against Kataja from Finland.

After the team was relegated from the TBL in the 2013–14 season, the club was dissolved.

== Season by season ==
Season	Tier	League	Pos.	Turkish Cup	European competitions	
2004–05	2	TB2L	8th			
2005–06	2	TB2L	7th			
2006–07	2	TB2L	3rd			
2007–08	2	TB2L	2nd			
2008–09	1	TBL	14th	Quarterfinalist		
2009–10	1	TBL	13th	Group Stage		
2010–11	1	TBL	14th	Quarterfinalist		
2011–12	1	TBL	7th	Quarterfinalist		
2012–13	1	TBL	11th	Group Stage	3 EuroChallenge	QR
2013–14	1	TBL	16th	Group Stage		

== Notable players ==
- (Turkey) Barış Güney
- (Turkey) Ceyhun Altay
- (Turkey) Fatih Solak
- (Turkey) Ümit Sonkol
- (Latvia) Kaspars Kambala
- (Serbia) Branislav Ratkovica
- (United States) Aubrey Coleman
- (United States) Aubrey Reese
- (United States) Brian Qvale
- (United States) - (Azerbaijan) Charles Davis
- (United States) Jack McClinton
- (United States) Jerome Randle
- (United States) Jarvis Hayes
- (United States) Tu Holloway
- (United States) Mike James
- (United States) Ryan Toolson
- (United States) - (Georgia (country)) Quinton Hosley
- (United States) Torin Francis
- (Canada) Marek Klassen
