= Oyak Renault =

Oyak-Renault
- League: TBL
- Founded: 1974; 51 years ago
- Dissolved: 2011
- History: Oyak-Renault (1974–present)
- Arena: Bursa Atatürk Sport Hall
- Capacity: 2,900
- Location: Bursa, Marmara, Turkey
- Team colors: Gold, Black
- Head coach: Yucel Platin

Oyak Renault was a professional basketball club based in Bursa, Turkey that lastly played in the Turkish Basketball Second League. Their home arena was the Bursa Atatürk Sport Hall. The club had played in the top men's professional basketball division Basketball Super League league between 1982–1984, 1992–2000, 2001–2004 and 2006-2011. The club was sponsored by the Oyak-Renault plant.

== Notable players ==
Note: Flags indicate national team eligibility at FIBA-sanctioned events. Players may hold other non-FIBA nationalities not displayed.

Criteria

To appear in this section a player must have either:

- Set a club record or won an individual award while at the club
- Played at least one official international match for their national team at any time
- Played at least one official NBA match at any time.

- (Turkey) Mehmet Okur
- (Canada) Olu Famutimi
- (Central African Republic) James Mays
- (Germany) Mithat Demirel
- (United States) Lorenzo Charles
- (United States) Ben Handlogten
- (United States) Josh Heytvelt
- (United States) Mike Rose
- (United States) Greg Stiemsma
- (United States) Marc Salyers
