= BJK Akatlar Arena =

Indoor arena located in Istanbul, Turkey

Akatlar Arena
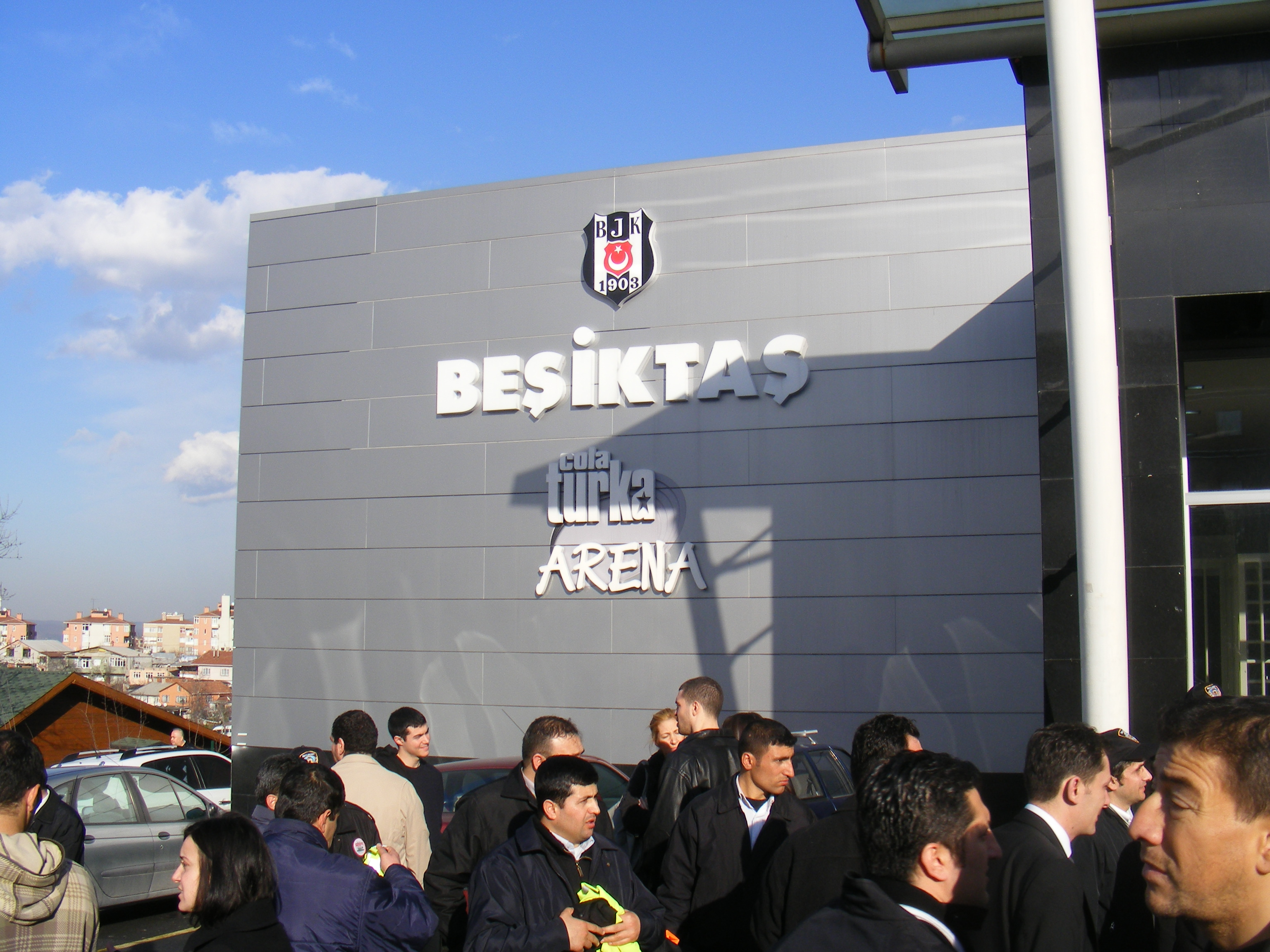
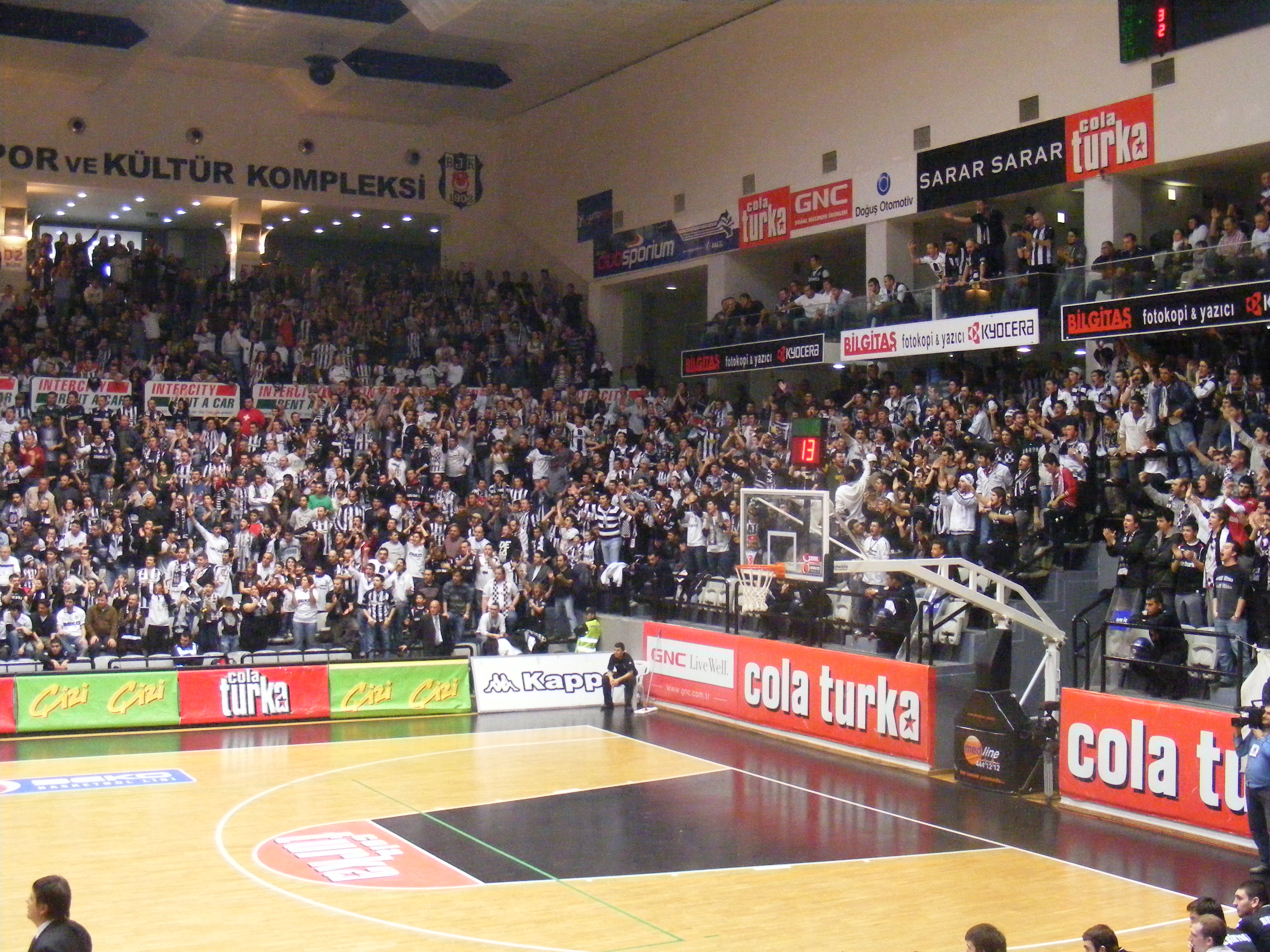
- Beşiktaş Akatlar Arena
- Interactive map of Akatlar Arena
- Former names: Beşiktaş Milangaz Arena (2011–2012); Beşiktaş Integral Arena
- Location: Akatlar, Istanbul
- Coordinates: 41.08680°N 29.02341°E
- Owner: Beşiktaş J.K.
- Capacity: Basketball: 3,200; Concert: 4,500

Construction
- Opened: 2004; 22 years ago
- Renovated: 2020

Tenants
- Beşiktaş Basketball; Bahçeşehir Koleji

Akatlar Arena is a multi-purpose indoor arena located in Akatlar, Istanbul, Turkey. The arena is the home court of Beşiktaş J.K.; it also serves the volleyball team. It is also suitable to host other events, such as concerts.

The Istanbul Municipality handed over its rights to multi-sports team Beşiktaş J.K. after the arena's construction and opening in 2004.

== Facilities ==
Located on 45 dunams of land property, Akatlar Arena contains six tennis courts, four synthetic pitches, a covered car park, an indoor swimming pool, a fitness centre, Turkey's biggest bowling club, a shopping centre, and several restaurants, all on approximately 8,500 m^{2} (91,000 sq ft). There is a 120 m^{2} (1,300 sq ft) cafeteria, five buffets serving the spectators during matches and exhibitions, VIP resting rooms, and three big and four small lodges for total of 80 persons.

The arena has seven entrances (three for visiting-team supporters), and a different entrance and car park also for VIPs. With complete precautions for fire hazards, there is also a generator placed in case of electrical power outages.

A terrace is available for use in summer time. There are four different locker rooms, which permit the arena to hold two consecutive matches. Each locker room has ten shower baths, three urinals, as well as private wardrobes and massage rooms. There are also four locker rooms for referees.

== Notable concerts ==
- Incubus in March 2007
- Roger Hodgson on 25 October 2007
- Nana Mouskouri in Nov 2007
