= Eurocup Basketball 2011–12 Last 16 Group K =

Standings and Results for Group K of the Last 16 phase of the 2011–12 Eurocup basketball tournament.

== Standings ==
Key to colors
Top two places in each group advance to the Quarterfinals

	Team	Pld	W	L	PF	PA	Diff	Tie-break
1.	(Russia) Spartak St. Petersburg	6	5	1	428	385	+43	
2.	(Montenegro) Budućnost	6	3	3	397	398	–1	1–1 (+3)
3.	(Turkey) Banvit	6	3	3	430	428	+2	1–1 (–3)
4.	(Slovenia) Krka	6	1	5	390	434	–44	

== Fixtures and results ==
All times given below are in Central European Time.

=== Game 1 ===
17 January 2012
18:00

Report

Banvit (Turkey)	77–65	(Slovenia) Krka
Scoring by quarter: 21–15, 19–18, 17–16, 20–16
Pts: Erdoğan 14; Rebs: Simmons 7 Asts: Ermiş 8		Pts: Dragić 13; Rebs: Murić 6 Asts: Nissim 3

Banvit Kara Ali Acar Sport Hall, Balıkesir
Attendance: 1,400
Referees: Roberto Chiari (ITA), Marius Ciulin (ROM), Omer Esteron (ISR)

17 January 2012
19:00

Report

Budućnost (Montenegro)	57–65	(Russia) Spartak St. Petersburg
Scoring by quarter: 12–16, 17–22, 13–7, 15–20
Pts: Anderson 11; Rebs: Dubljević 5 Asts: Three players 2		Pts: Beverley 25; Rebs: Dragičević 9 Asts: Halperin 6

Morača Sports Center, Podgorica
Attendance: 1,800
Referees: Paolo Taurino (ITA), Anastasios Piloidis (GRE), Aleksandar Milojevik (MKD)

=== Game 2 ===
24 January 2012
18:30

Report

Krka (Slovenia)	64–69	(Montenegro) Budućnost
Scoring by quarter: 16–23, 14–17, 13–17, 21–12
Pts: Dragić 14; Rebs: Pavič 9 Asts: Dragić 4		Pts: Ivanović, Anderson 11; Rebs: Milošević 7 Asts: Popović, Anderson 4

Leon Štukelj Hall, Novo Mesto
Attendance: 1,200
Referees: Elias Koromilas (GRE), Gianluca Mattioli (ITA), Marcin Kowalski (POL)

24 January 2012
19:00

Report

Spartak St. Petersburg (Russia)	80–71	(Turkey) Banvit
Scoring by quarter: 24–20, 25–20, 11–16, 20–15
Pts: Mavrokefalidis 29; Rebs: Mavrokefalidis 8 Asts: Halperin 6		Pts: Davis 16; Rebs: Simmons 7 Asts: Ermiş 3

Yubileyny Sports Palace, Saint Petersburg
Attendance: 1,600
Referees: Dubravko Muhvic (CRO), Sergiy Chebyshev (UKR), Jurgis Laurinavicius (LTU)

=== Game 3 ===
31 January 2012
18:00

Report

Banvit (Turkey)	68–61	(Montenegro) Budućnost
Scoring by quarter: 18–16, 13–11, 22–9, 15–25
Pts: Williams 21; Rebs: Ermiş 9 Asts: Ermiş 6		Pts: Vitkovac, Dubljević 14; Rebs: Three players 5 Asts: Krstović 3

Banvit Kara Ali Acar Sport Hall, Balıkesir
Attendance: 1,725
Referees: Jose Ramon Garcia Ortiz (ESP), Oscar Perea (ESP), Marko Juras (SRB)

31 January 2012
18:00

Report

Krka (Slovenia)	68–81	(Russia) Spartak St. Petersburg
Scoring by quarter: 13–20, 15–19, 19–21, 21–21
Pts: Pavič 15; Rebs: Dragić 8 Asts: Rojc 5		Pts: Mavrokefalidis 20; Rebs: Mavrokefalidis 5 Asts: Halperin 7

Leon Štukelj Hall, Novo Mesto
Attendance: 1,000
Referees: Vicente Bulto (ESP), Antonio Conde (ESP), Rustu Nuran (TUR)

=== Game 4 ===
7 February 2012
16:00

Report

Spartak St. Petersburg (Russia)	71–57	(Slovenia) Krka
Scoring by quarter: 21–15, 20–19, 10–10, 12–13
Pts: Dragičević 19; Rebs: Kashirov, Dragičević 5 Asts: Beverley 7		Pts: Dragić 12; Rebs: Lučić 6 Asts: Dragić 3

Yubileyny Sports Palace, Saint Petersburg
Attendance: 700
Referees: Jakub Zamojski (POL), Marius Ciulin (ROM), Omer Esteron (ISR)

7 February 2012
18:30

Report

Budućnost (Montenegro)	83–73	(Turkey) Banvit
Scoring by quarter: 24–22, 20–21, 22–10, 17–20
Pts: Dubljević 24; Rebs: Dubljević 10; Asts: Ivanović 5		Pts: Davis 18; Rebs: Three players 5 Asts: Ermiş 3

Morača Sports Center, Podgorica
Attendance: 1,100
Referees: Milivoje Jovcic (SRB), Carmelo Paternico (ITA), Petar Obradovic (BIH)

=== Game 5 ===
21 February 2012
16:00

Report

Spartak St. Petersburg (Russia)	70–64	(Montenegro) Budućnost
Scoring by quarter: 19–24, 17–12, 13–18, 21–10
Pts: Beverley 19; Rebs: Zupan 8 Asts: Strēlnieks 7		Pts: Krstović 11; Rebs: Dubljević, Vitkovac 7 Asts: Ivanović 4

Yubileyny Sports Palace, Saint Petersburg
Attendance: 500
Referees: Recep Ankarali (TUR), Boris Shulga (UKR), Jurgis Laurinavicius (LTU)

21 February 2012
19:00

Report

Krka (Slovenia)	78–73	(Turkey) Banvit
Scoring by quarter: 21–21, 21–19, 11–17, 25–16
Pts: Balažič 23; Rebs: Balažič 6 Asts: Nissim 4		Pts: Williams, Hammonds 14; Rebs: Three players 5 Asts: Erdoğan 4

Leon Štukelj Hall, Novo Mesto
Attendance: 800
Referees: Spiros Gkontas (GRE), Gianluca Mattioli (ITA), Petar Obradovic (BIH)

=== Game 6 ===
28 February 2012
18:00

Report

Budućnost (Montenegro)	63–58	(Slovenia) Krka
Scoring by quarter: 22–16, 16–19, 14–11, 11–12
Pts: Krstović, Ivanović 14; Rebs: Dubljević 11; Asts: Ivanović 3		Pts: Pavič, Dragić 14; Rebs: Dragić 8 Asts: Dragić 3

Morača Sports Center, Podgorica
Attendance: 3,500
Referees: Murat Biricik (TUR), Roberto Chiari (ITA), Marcin Kowalski (POL)

28 February 2012
18:00

Report

Banvit (Turkey)	68–61	(Russia) Spartak St. Petersburg
Scoring by quarter: 17–21, 15–17, 18–8, 18–15
Pts: Lucas 18; Rebs: Bajramović 7 Asts: Veyseloğlu, Simmons 3		Pts: Likhodey, Beverley 16; Rebs: Keyru 6 Asts: Four players 3

Banvit Kara Ali Acar Sport Hall, Balıkesir
Attendance: 1,650
Referees: Sasa Maricic (SRB), Tomas Trawicki (POL), Ioannis Foufis (GRE)
