= Eurocup Basketball 2011–12 Regular Season Group E =

Standings and Results for Group E of the Regular Season phase of the 2011–12 Eurocup basketball tournament.

== Standings ==
Key to colors
Top two teams advance to Last 16

	Team	Pld	W	L	PF	PA	Diff
1.	(Turkey) Banvit	6	4	2	421	397	+24
2.	(Russia) Lokomotiv-Kuban	6	4	2	431	399	+32
3.	(Spain) Gran Canaria	6	4	2	416	405	+11
4.	(Germany) Skyliners Frankfurt	6	0	6	362	429	−67

== Fixtures and results ==
All times given below are in Central European Time.

=== Game 1 ===
15 November 2011
17:00

Report

Banvit B.K. (Turkey)	73–72	(Germany) Skyliners Frankfurt
Scoring by quarter: 22–20, 17–14, 20–24, 14–14
Pts: Williams 20; Rebs: Simmons 5 Asts: Ermiş 7		Pts: Davidson 21; Rebs: Davidson 7 Asts: Thompson 6

Banvit Kara Ali Acar Sport Hall, Bandırma
Attendance: 1,059
Referees: Sasa Pukl (SLO), Miroslav Tomov (BUL), Igor Dragojevic (MNE)

15 November 2011
21:30

Report

Gran Canaria (Spain)	84–76	(Russia) Lokomotiv-Kuban
Scoring by quarter: 27–17, 16–24, 20–18, 21–17
Pts: Green 18; Rebs: Nelson 7 Asts: Green, Nelson 3		Pts: Massey 22; Rebs: Massey 13; Asts: Blakney 5

Centro Insular de Deportes, Las Palmas
Referees: Luigi Lamonica (ITA), Matej Boltauzer (SLO), Enrico Sabetta (ITA)

=== Game 2 ===
22 November 2011
16:30

Report

Lokomotiv-Kuban (Russia)	75–67	(Turkey) Banvit B.K.
Scoring by quarter: 22–15, 24–22, 13–21, 16–9
Pts: Massey 22; Rebs: Massey 12; Asts: Sheleketo 3		Pts: Davis 15; Rebs: Three players 5 Asts: Hammonds 4

Olympus Arena, Krasnodar
Attendance: 3,000
Referees: Grzegorz Ziemblicki (POL), Oskars Lucis (LAT), Haris Bijedic (BIH)

22 November 2011
19:30

Report

Skyliners Frankfurt (Germany)	58–71	(Spain) Gran Canaria
Scoring by quarter: 11–18, 22–15, 10–22, 15–17
Pts: Leuer 20; Rebs: Davidson, Leuer 8 Asts: Thompson 4		Pts: Nelson 14; Rebs: Palacios 8 Asts: Bellas 4

Fraport Arena, Frankfurt
Attendance: 1,430
Referees: Spiros Gkontas (GRE), Marius Ciulin (ROM), Petar Obradovic (BIH)

=== Game 3 ===
29 November 2011
16:30

Report

Lokomotiv-Kuban (Russia)	83–60	(Germany) Skyliners Frankfurt
Scoring by quarter: 16–16, 26–19, 20–8, 21–17
Pts: Massey 18; Rebs: Traore 10; Asts: Bykov 8		Pts: Robertson 15; Rebs: Davidson 6 Asts: Thompson 3

Olympus Arena, Krasnodar
Attendance: 5,000
Referees: Robert Vyklicky (CZE), Radomir Vojinovic (MNE), Sergey Zashchuk (UKR)

29 November 2011
21:30

Report

Gran Canaria (Spain)	85–61	(Turkey) Banvit B.K.
Scoring by quarter: 21–14, 18–14, 16–16, 30–17
Pts: Beiran 14; Rebs: Nelson, Rey 6 Asts: Palacios 5		Pts: Davis 12; Rebs: Nalga, Bajramović 6 Asts: Ermiş, Davis 2

Centro Insular de Deportes, Las Palmas
Referees: Paolo Taurino (ITA), Elias Koromilas (GRE), Arnis Ozols (LAT)

=== Game 4 ===
6 December 2011
18:00

Report

Banvit B.K. (Turkey)	79–54	(Spain) Gran Canaria
Scoring by quarter: 20–20, 25–10, 21–15, 13–9
Pts: Simmons 18; Rebs: Bajramović 10; Asts: Hammonds 7		Pts: Palacios 13; Rebs: Palacios 8 Asts: Haynes 5

Banvit Kara Ali Acar Sport Hall, Bandırma
Attendance: 2,150
Referees: Ilija Belosevic (SRB), Marcin Kowalski (POL), Gentian Cici (ALB)

6 December 2011
19:30

Report

Skyliners Frankfurt (Germany)	58–69	(Russia) Lokomotiv-Kuban
Scoring by quarter: 11–13, 19–13, 10–25, 18–18
Pts: McKinney 13; Rebs: Davidson 10; Asts: Herber 5		Pts: Traore 18; Rebs: Shukhovtsov, Traore 8 Asts: Blakney 3

Fraport Arena, Frankfurt
Attendance: 1,240
Referees: Milivoje Jovcic (SRB), Sergey Chebyshev (UKR), Carmelo Lo Guzzo (ITA)

=== Game 5 ===
13 December 2011
16:30

Report

Lokomotiv-Kuban (Russia)	73–51	(Spain) Gran Canaria
Scoring by quarter: 15–14, 19–15, 16–10, 23–12
Pts: Massey 16; Rebs: Massey 14; Asts: Chalmers 4		Pts: Haynes 16; Rebs: Nelson 11; Asts: Beiran 2

Olympus Arena, Krasnodar
Attendance: 5,000
Referees: Murat Biricik (TUR), Oscar Lefwerth (SWE), Tomasz Trawicki (POL)

13 December 2011
19:30

Report

Skyliners Frankfurt (Germany)	56–62	(Turkey) Banvit B.K.
Scoring by quarter: 8–19, 17–13, 19–14, 12–16
Pts: McKinney 14; Rebs: Nolte 4 Asts: Robertson 4		Pts: Hammonds 15; Rebs: Simmons 7 Asts: three players 3

Fraport Arena, Frankfurt
Attendance: 1,140
Referees: Dubravko Muhvic (CRO), Roman Kolar (SLO), Enrico Sabetta (ITA)

=== Game 6 ===
20 December 2011
20:00

Report

Gran Canaria (Spain)	71–58	(Germany) Skyliners Frankfurt
Scoring by quarter: 13–18, 17–10, 19–13, 22–17
Pts: Nelson 15; Rebs: Nelson 9 Asts: Green 6		Pts: McKinney 27; Rebs: Davidson 16; Asts: three players 2

Centro Insular de Deportes, Las Palmas
Referees: Spiros Gkontas (GRE), Aleksandar Milojevic (MKD), Eddie Viator (FRA)

20 December 2011
20:00

Report

Banvit B.K. (Turkey)	79–55	(Russia) Lokomotiv-Kuban
Scoring by quarter: 22–14, 20–15, 20–14, 17–12
Pts: Davis 15; Rebs: Davis 7 Asts: Ermiş 8		Pts: Blakney 12; Rebs: three players 4 Asts: Blakney 5

Banvit Kara Ali Acar Sport Hall, Bandırma
Attendance: 2,122
Referees: Matej Boltauzer (SLO), Boris Shulga (UKR), Igor Dragojevic (MNE)
