= Eurocup Basketball 2012–13 Last 16 Group I =

Standings and Results for Group I of the Last 16 phase of the 2012–13 Eurocup basketball tournament.

== Standings ==
Key to colors
Top two places in each group advance to the Quarterfinals

	Team	Pld	W	L	PF	PA	Diff	Tie-break
1.	(Ukraine) BC Budivelnyk Kyiv	6	4	2	486	478	+8	
2.	(Montenegro) KK Budućnost VOLI	6	3	3	456	436	+20	1–1 (+7)
3.	(Turkey) Banvit B.K.	6	3	3	477	479	–2	1–1 (–7)
4.	(Russia) BC Triumph Lyubertsy	6	2	4	478	504	–26	

== Fixtures and results ==
All times given below are in Central European Time.

=== Game 1 ===
9 January 2013
18:00

Report

BC Budivelnyk Kyiv (Ukraine)	76–69	(Turkey) Banvit B.K.
Scoring by quarter: 12–15, 19–24, 26–15, 19–15
Pts: Lyons 15; Rebs: Drozdov 10; Asts: Tsintsadze 4		Pts: Davis 21; Rebs: Bajramović 7 Asts: Erdoğan, Mejia 3

Palace of Sports, Kyiv
Attendance: 1,900
Referees: Sreten Radović (CRO), Marek Cmikiewicz (POL), Jurgis Laurinavičius (LTU)

9 January 2013
19:00

Report

KK Budućnost VOLI (Montenegro)	90–69	(Russia) BC Triumph Lyubertsy
Scoring by quarter: 24–20, 23–24, 15–9, 28–16
Pts: Vitkovac 24; Rebs: Vitkovac 12; Asts: Popović 4		Pts: Mitchell 20; Rebs: McKee, Landry 8 Asts: McKee 5

Morača Sports Center, Podgorica
Attendance: 2,900
Referees: Dani Hierrezuelo (ESP), Sergiy Zashchuk (UKR), Petros Papapetrou (GRE)

=== Game 2 ===
16 January 2013
16:30

Report

BC Triumph Lyubertsy (Russia)	84–85	(Ukraine) BC Budivelnyk Kyiv
Scoring by quarter: 23–26, 24–27, 27–12, 10–20
Pts: McKee 21; Rebs: Landry 8 Asts: McKee 7		Pts: Lyons 26; Rebs: Lyons 16; Asts: Tsintsadze 3

SH Triumph, Lyubertsy
Attendance: 1,500
Referees: Anastasios Piloidis (GRE), Regis Bardera (FRA), Tomasz Trawicki (POL)

16 January 2013
18:00

Report

Banvit B.K. (Turkey)	89–80	(Montenegro) KK Budućnost VOLI
Scoring by quarter: 18–22, 30–20, 21–23, 20–15
Pts: Davis, Štimac 17; Rebs: Štimac 9 Asts: Mejia 4		Pts: Popović 16; Rebs: Milošević 5 Asts: Vitkovac 4

Banvit Kara Ali Acar Sport Hall, Bandırma
Attendance: 2,645
Referees: Paolo Taurino (ITA), Tomas Jasevicius (LTU), Aare Halliko (EST)

=== Game 3 ===
23 January 2013
18:00

Report

Banvit B.K. (Turkey)	86–79	(Russia) BC Triumph Lyubertsy
Scoring by quarter: 22–11, 26–23, 14–28, 24–17
Pts: Davis 26; Rebs: Štimac 10; Asts: Štimac 4		Pts: Mitchell 22; Rebs: Mitchell 8 Asts: McKee 7

Banvit Kara Ali Acar Sport Hall, Bandırma
Attendance: 2,355
Referees: Andrej Jersan (SLO), Sasa Maricic (SRB), Ioannis Foufis (GRE)

23 January 2013
18:00

Report

BC Budivelnyk Kyiv (Ukraine)	75–79	(Montenegro) KK Budućnost VOLI
Scoring by quarter: 18–20, 22–24, 25–11, 10–24
Pts: Delaney 20; Rebs: Lyons 10; Asts: Delaney 5		Pts: Vitkovac 24; Rebs: Vitkovac 10; Asts: Bost 5

Palace of Sports, Kyiv
Attendance: 2,000
Referees: Spiros Gkontas (GRE), Petri Mantyla (FIN), Miroslav Tomov (BUL)

=== Game 4 ===
30 January 2013
16:00

Report

BC Triumph Lyubertsy (Russia)	93–89	(Turkey) Banvit B.K.
Scoring by quarter: 28–19, 24–19, 19–23, 22–28
Pts: Karasev 19; Rebs: Landry 13; Asts: McKee 10		Pts: Davis 21; Rebs: Simmons, Štimac 5 Asts: Lucas 3

SH Triumph, Lyubertsy
Attendance: 1,500
Referees: Sinisa Herceg (CRO), Zdravko Rutesic (MNE), Saso Petek (SLO)

30 January 2013
19:00

Report

KK Budućnost VOLI (Montenegro)	75–77	(Ukraine) BC Budivelnyk Kyiv
Scoring by quarter: 28–16, 21–21, 16–18, 10–22
Pts: Vitkovac 18; Rebs: Vitkovac 10; Asts: Vitkovac 5		Pts: Lyons 17; Rebs: Drozdov 8 Asts: Tsintsadze 7

Morača Sports Center, Podgorica
Attendance: 2,100
Referees: Nicola Maestre (FRA), Oliver Krause (GER), Omer Esteron (ISR)

=== Game 5 ===
13 February 2013
16:30

Report

BC Triumph Lyubertsy (Russia)	76–66	(Montenegro) KK Budućnost VOLI
Scoring by quarter: 18–16, 12-14, 21–22, 25–14
Pts: Karasev 24; Rebs: McKee 5 Asts: McKee 8		Pts: Popović 18; Rebs: Vitkovac 8 Asts: Bost 5

SH Triumph, Lyubertsy
Attendance: 1500
Referees: Robert Vyklicky (CZE), Boris Shulga (UKR), Lahdo Sharro (SWE)

13 February 2013
18:00

Report

Banvit B.K. (Turkey)	94–85	(Ukraine) BC Budivelnyk Kyiv
Scoring by quarter: 24–25, 31–20, 16–24, 23–16
Pts: Davis 24; Rebs: Davis 9 Asts: Lucas 4		Pts: Lyons 20; Rebs: Lyons 11; Asts: Tsintsadze, Delaney 5

Banvit Kara Ali Acar Sport Hall, Bandırma
Attendance: 3,000
Referees: Fernando Rocha (POR), Elias Koromilas (GRE), Seffi Shemmesh (ISR)

=== Game 6 ===
20 February 2013
18:00

KK Budućnost VOLI (Montenegro)	66–50	(Turkey) Banvit B.K.
Scoring by quarter: 17–14, 19–7, 15–14, 15–15
Pts: Bost 16; Rebs: Milošević 9 Asts: Popović 5		Pts: Lucas 12; Rebs: Davis, Simmons 4 Asts: Davis, Simmons 2

Morača Sports Center, Podgorica
Attendance: 2700
Referees: Borys Ryzhyk (UKR), Roberto Chiari (ITA), Marius Ciulin (ROM)

20 February 2013
18:00

BC Budivelnyk Kyiv (Ukraine)	88–77	(Russia) BC Triumph Lyubertsy
Scoring by quarter: 21–21, 16–22, 21–10, 30–24
Pts: Delaney 26; Rebs: Lyons 8 Asts: Delaney 7		Pts: McKee 17; Rebs: McKee 7 Asts: McKee 4

Palace of Sports, Kyiv
Attendance: 2800
Referees: Milivoje Jovcic (SRB), Marko Juras (SRB), Ingus Baumanis (LAT)
