= Eurocup Basketball 2012–13 Regular Season Group D =

Standings and Results for Group D of the Regular Season phase of the 2012–13 Eurocup basketball tournament.

== Standings ==
All times are CET (UTC+1).

Key to colors
Top two teams advance to Last 16

	Team	Pld	W	L	PF	PA	Diff	Tie-break
1.	(Spain) Valencia BC	6	5	1	520	439	+81	
2.	(Turkey) Banvit B.K.	6	4	2	522	485	+37	
3.	(Germany) s.Oliver Baskets	6	3	3	460	509	–49	
4.	(Ukraine) BC Azovmash Mariupol	6	0	6	455	524	–69	

=== Game 1 ===
6 November 2012
19:30

Report

s.Oliver Baskets (Germany)	81–77	(Ukraine) BC Azovmash Mariupol
Scoring by quarter: 9–16, 25–17, 23–28, 24–16
Pts: Anderson 19; Rebs: Anderson 10; Asts: Anderson 3		Pts: Greer 25; Rebs: Harris, Pecherov 5 Asts: Greer 4

s.Oliver Arena, Würzburg
Attendance: 2,164
Referees: Ilija Belosevic (SRB), Haris Bjedic (BIH), Petros Papapetrou (GRE)

6 November 2012
20:45

Report

Valencia BC (Spain)	88–78	(Turkey) Banvit B.K.
Scoring by quarter: 23-21, 24-22, 26-21, 15-14
Pts: Ribas 23; Rebs: Faverani 7 Asts: Ribas 4		Pts: Davis 16; Rebs: Mejia 8 Asts: Erdoğan, Mejia 4

Pabellón Municipal Fuente San Luis, Valencia
Attendance: 6,000
Referees: Dubravko Muhvic (CRO), Sasa Maricic (SRB), Moritz Reiter (GER)

=== Game 2 ===
14 November 2012
17:00

Report

BC Azovmash Mariupol (Ukraine)	70–76	(Spain) Valencia BC
Scoring by quarter: 23-13, 17–27, 14–24, 16-12
Pts: Pecherov 18; Rebs: Harris 10; Asts: Harris 7		Pts: Lishouk, Dubljević 14; Rebs: Piétrus 8 Asts: Ribas 3

Azovmash Arena, Mariupol
Attendance: 2,790
Referees: Christos Christodoulou (GRE), Ersan Kartal (TUR), Tomislav Vovk (CRO)

14 November 2012
18:00

Report

Banvit B.K. (Turkey)	101–82	(Germany) s.Oliver Baskets
Scoring by quarter: 22-32, 32-18, 22-21, 25-11
Pts: Mejia 23; Rebs: Mejia, Davis 8 Asts: Simmons, Bajramovic 3		Pts: Anderson 20; Rebs: King 5 Asts: Jacobson 4

Banvit Kara Ali Acar Sport Hall, Bandırma
Attendance: 1,324
Referees: Damir Javor (SLO), Igor Dragojevic (MNE), Aleksandar Milojevik (MKD)

=== Game 3 ===
20 November 2012
20:30

Report

Valencia BC (Spain)	97–64	(Germany) s.Oliver Baskets
Scoring by quarter: 20-18, 24-20, 25-14, 28-12
Pts: Doellman 31; Rebs: San Miguel 9 Asts: San Miguel 9		Pts: Anderson 13; Rebs: Boone 5 Asts: McIntosh, Stuckey 2

Pabellón Municipal Fuente San Luis, Valencia
Attendance: 5,000
Referees: Luis Lopes (POR), Robert Vyklicky (CZE), Alexey Davydov (RUS)

21 November 2012
18:00

Report

Banvit B.K. (Turkey)	97–81	(Ukraine) BC Azovmash Mariupol
Scoring by quarter: 31-21, 27-21, 18-22, 21-17
Pts: Mejia 28; Rebs: Mejia, Štimac 7 Asts: Mejia 4		Pts: Harris 20; Rebs: Paunić 11; Asts: Greer 5

Banvit Kara Ali Acar Sport Hall, Bandırma
Attendance: 2,046
Referees: Andrej Lovsyn (SLO), Miroslav Tomov (BUL), Aleksandar Glisic (SRB)

=== Game 4 ===
28 November 2012
17:00

Report

BC Azovmash Mariupol (Ukraine)	88–95 (OT)	(Turkey) Banvit B.K.
Scoring by quarter: 19-19, 24-20, 20-17, 19-26, Overtime: 6-13
Pts: Greer 28; Rebs: Raduljica 6 Asts: Greer 10		Pts: Davis 22; Rebs: Bajramovic 12; Asts: Davis, Mejia 5

Azovmash Arena, Mariupol
Attendance: 2,350
Referees: Jakub Zamojski (POL), Aare Halliko (EST), Alexey Davydov (RUS)

28 November 2012
19:30

Report

s.Oliver Baskets (Germany)	89–82	(Spain) Valencia BC
Scoring by quarter: 20-20, 18-21, 24-17, 27-24
Pts: McKinney 21; Rebs: Boone 7 Asts: Jacobson 7		Pts: Martínez 20; Rebs: Martínez 6 Asts: San Miguel 3

s.Oliver Arena, Würzburg
Attendance: 3,000
Referees: Borys Ryzhyk (UKR), Arnis Ozols (LAT), Omer Esteron (ISR)

=== Game 5 ===
5 December 2012
17:00

Report

BC Azovmash Mariupol (Ukraine)	71–82	(Germany) s.Oliver Baskets
Scoring by quarter: 23−27, 14−23, 20−13, 14−19
Pts: Kolchenko 17; Rebs: Raduljica, Serapinas 7 Asts: Greer 6		Pts: King 21; Rebs: McKinney 8 Asts: Jacobson, McKinney 4

Azovmash Arena, Mariupol
Attendance: 2,740
Referees: Srdan Dozai (CRO), Joseph Bissang (FRA), Saso Petek (SLO)

5 December 2012
18:00

Report

Banvit B.K. (Turkey)	70–84	(Spain) Valencia BC
Scoring by quarter: 19–22, 15–20, 27–15, 9–27
Pts: Lucas 16; Rebs: Mejia, Štimac 6 Asts: Mejia 2		Pts: Doellman 27; Rebs: Doellman, Piétrus 4 Asts: San Miguel, Martínez 6

Banvit Kara Ali Acar Sport Hall, Bandırma
Attendance: 3,000
Referees: Guerrino Cerebuch (ITA), Panagiotis Anastopoulos (GRE), Gentian Cici (ALB)

=== Game 6 ===
12 December 2012
20:30

Report

Valencia BC (Spain)	93–68	(Ukraine) BC Azovmash Mariupol
Scoring by quarter: 30-15, 27-17, 18-20, 18-16
Pts: Dubljević 26; Rebs: Dubljević 8 Asts: Marković 6		Pts: Raduljica 14; Rebs: Dragićević 6 Asts: Slipenchuk 8

Pabellón Municipal Fuente San Luis, Valencia
Attendance: 3,800
Referees: Andrej Lovsin (SLO), Anastasios Piloidis (GRE), Jasmina Juras (SRB)

12 December 2012
20:30

Report

s.Oliver Baskets (Germany)	62–81	(Turkey) Banvit B.K.
Scoring by quarter: 16–27, 10–18, 21–17, 15–19
Pts: Anderson 14; Rebs: Anderson 9 Asts: Pigram 5		Pts: Davis 22; Rebs: Štimac 10; Asts: Mejia 5

s.Oliver Arena, Würzburg
Attendance: 3,000
Referees: Ilija Belosevic (SRB), Boris Shulga (UKR), Carlos Cortes (ESP)
