= 2014–15 Eurocup Basketball knockout stage =

The 2014–15 Eurocup Basketball knockout stage is the last phase in the competition. Eight-finals started on March 3 and the Finals were played on April 24 and 29.

All times are CET (UTC+1).

== Round of 16 ==
The eight-finals were two-legged ties determined on aggregate score. The first legs were played on March 2–3 and return legs were played on March 9–10. The group winner in each tie, listed as "Team #1", hosted the second leg.

Team #1	Agg.	Team #2	1st leg	2nd leg
UNICS (Russia)	145–136	(Italy) Foxtown Cantù	70–64	75–72
Lokomotiv Kuban (Russia)	150–131	(Germany) Brose Baskets	80–78	70–53
Herbalife Gran Canaria (Spain)	159–148	(Croatia) Cedevita	84–76	75–72
Pınar Karşıyaka (Turkey)	178–162	(Lithuania) Lietuvos Rytas	81–81	97–81
Acea Roma (Italy)	121–127	(Turkey) Banvit	55–71	66–56
PGE Turów (Poland)	149–161	(France) Paris-Levallois	71–74	78–87
Khimki (Russia)	175–154	(Russia) Zenit	86–84	89–70
Bayern Munich (Germany)	118–174	(Spain) Valencia Basket	58–80	60–94

=== Game 1 ===
3 March 2015
18:00

Boxscore

Zenit (Russia)	84–86	(Russia) Khimki
Scoring by quarter: 18–26, 16–27, 32–23, 18–10
Pts: three players 16; Rebs: Landry 10; Asts: Hodge 9 PIR: Kulagin 18		Pts: Rice 22; Rebs: Augustine 9 Asts: Rice 6 PIR: Monia, Pateev 20

Sibur Arena, Saint Petersburg
Attendance: 2,850
Referees: Boris Ryzhyk (UKR), Arnis Ozols (LAT), Robert Vyklicky (CZE)

3 March 2015
20:30

Boxscore

Paris-Levallois (France)	74–71	(Poland) PGE Turów
Scoring by quarter: 17–19, 20–14, 16–22, 21–16
Pts: Oniangue 12; Rebs: Ford, Sane 6 Asts: Green 5 PIR: Christmas, Ford 14		Pts: Collins 15; Rebs: Collins 13; Asts: Collins 7 PIR: Collins 26

Palais des Sports Marcel-Cerdan, Paris
Attendance: 2,800
Referees: Emilio Pérez Pizarro (ESP), Aleksandar Glisic (SRB), Carlos Cortés (ESP)

4 March 2015
18:00

Boxscore

Banvit (Turkey)	71–55	(Italy) Acea Roma
Scoring by quarter: 22–18, 18–16, 12–15, 19–4
Pts: Mejía 18; Rebs: Mejía 9 Asts: Mejía, Rowland 5 PIR: Mejía 33		Pts: Ejim 16; Rebs: Ebid, Ejim 5 Asts: Stipčević 6 PIR: Ejim 21

Kara Ali Acar Sport Hall, Bandırma
Attendance: 2,850
Referees: Vicente Bultó (ESP), Óscar Perea (ESP), Josip Radojković (CRO)

4 March 2015
18:00

Boxscore

Lietuvos Rytas (Lithuania)	81–81	(Turkey) Pınar Karşıyaka
Scoring by quarter: 30–21, 19–19, 18–27, 14–14
Pts: Gecevičius 19; Rebs: Orelik 8 Asts: Gecevičius 5 PIR: Gecevičius 26		Pts: Dixon 20; Rebs: Dixon 5 Asts: Dixon 7 PIR: Dixon 27

Lietuvos Rytas Arena, Vilnius
Attendance: 2,050
Referees: Miguel Ángel Pérez Pérez (ESP), Sinisa Herceg (CRO), Semen Ovinov (RUS)

4 March 2015
19:00

Boxscore

Brose Baskets (Germany)	78–80	(Russia) Lokomotiv Kuban
Scoring by quarter: 15–27, 22–20, 20–17, 21–16
Pts: Strēlnieks 15; Rebs: Mbakwe 12; Asts: Wanamaker 6 PIR: Strēlnieks 18		Pts: Simon 20; Rebs: Hendrix, Simon 5 Asts: Delaney 5 PIR: Simon 23

Brose Arena, Bamberg
Attendance: 6,800
Referees: Juan Carlos García González (ESP), Seffi Shemmesh (ISR), Tomislav Hordov (CRO)

4 March 2015
19:00

Boxscore

Cedevita (Croatia)	76–84	(Spain) Herbalife Gran Canaria
Scoring by quarter: 25–19, 19–26, 16–17, 16–22
Pts: Pilepić 18; Rebs: Bilan 6 Asts: Gordić 12; PIR: Bilan 25		Pts: Newley 16; Rebs: Tavares 11; Asts: Bellas 7 PIR: Tavares 21

Dražen Petrović Basketball Hall, Zagreb
Attendance: 2,500
Referees: Fernando Rocha (POR), Nicola Mestre (FRA), Anastasios Piloidis (GRE)

4 March 2015
20:30

Boxscore

FoxTown Cantù (Italy)	64–70	(Russia) UNICS Kazan
Scoring by quarter: 19–27, 19–12, 17–21, 9–10
Pts: Johnson-Odom 15; Rebs: Williams 7 Asts: Buva, Gentile 2 PIR: Abbas, Gentile 11		Pts: Bykov, Langford 14; Rebs: Fischer 11; Asts: three players 2 PIR: Bykov, Fischer 17

Mapooro Arena, Desio
Attendance: 2,602
Referees: Recep Ankaralı (TUR), Petri Mantyla (FIN), Jean-Charles Collin (FRA)

4 March 2015
20:45

Boxscore

Valencia Basket (Spain)	80–58	(Germany) Bayern Munich
Scoring by quarter: 16–16, 21–17, 21–11, 19–14
Pts: Dubljević 18; Rebs: Aguilar, Dubljević 6 Asts: Ribas, Van Rossom 3 PIR: Bojan Dubljević 22		Pts: Micić 19; Rebs: Bryant 8 Asts: Schaffartzik 5 PIR: Micić 18

Pabellón Municipal Fuente de San Luis, Valencia
Attendance: 8,200
Referees: Eddie Viator (FRA), Marek Cmikiewicz (POL), Sérgio Silva (POR)

=== Game 2 ===
10 March 2015
18:00

Boxscore

Lokomotiv Kuban (Russia)	70–53	(Germany) Brose Baskets
Scoring by quarter: 23–10, 17–17, 20–14, 10–12
Pts: Brown 22; Rebs: three players 5 Asts: Brown 5 PIR: Brown 30		Pts: Strēlnieks 15; Rebs: Mbakwe 7 Asts: Harris, Robinson 2 PIR: Strēlnieks 20
Lokomotiv Kuban wins series by 150–131

Basket-Hall, Krasnodar
Attendance: 5,211
Referees: Milivoje Jovcic (SRB), Roberto Chiari (ITA), Marko Juras (SRB)

11 March 2015
17:00

Boxscore

UNICS Kazan (Russia)	75–72	(Italy) FoxTown Cantù
Scoring by quarter: 11–14, 29–17, 16–20, 19–21
Pts: Kaimakoglou 14; Rebs: Kaimakoglou 8 Asts: Kaimakoglou, Langford 5 PIR: Keith Langford 18		Pts: Buva 17; Rebs: Buva 6 Asts: Feldeine 4 PIR: Buva 20
UNICS Kazan wins series by 145–136

Basket-Hall Arena, Kazan
Attendance: 2,500
Referees: Jakub Zamojski (POL), Murat Biricik (TUR), Uros Obrknezevic (SRB)

11 March 2015
18:00

Boxscore

Khimki (Russia)	89–70	(Russia) Zenit
Scoring by quarter: 26–11, 20–22, 27–16, 16–21
Pts: Koponen 24; Rebs: Monia 8 Asts: Koponen 3 PIR: Koponen 27		Pts: Vikhrov 14; Rebs: Borovnjak 6 Asts: Hodge, Vikhrov 1 PIR: Vikhrov 19
Khimki wins series by 175–154

Basketball Center, Khimki
Attendance: 2,100
Referees: Panagiotis Anastopoulos (GRE), Damir Javor (SLO), Ingus Baumanis (LAT)

11 March 2015
19:00

Boxscore

PGE Turów (Poland)	78–87	(France) Paris-Levallois
Scoring by quarter: 22–18, 12–26, 15–14, 29–29
Pts: Kulig 16; Rebs: Moldoveanu 10; Asts: Collins 6 PIR: Moldoveanu 23		Pts: Schilb 24; Rebs: Ford 9 Asts: Green 6 PIR: Green 28
Paris-Levallois wins the series by 161–149

PGE Turów Arena, Zgorzelec
Attendance: 3,005
Referees: Paolo Taurino (ITA), Sasa Maricic (SRB), Saso Petek (SLO)

11 March 2015
19:00

Boxscore

Pınar Karşıyaka (Turkey)	97–81	(Lithuania) Lietuvos Rytas
Scoring by quarter: 20–13, 33–21, 27–25, 17–22
Pts: Diebler 26; Rebs: Gabriel 6 Asts: four players 5 PIR: Diebler 31		Pts: Orelik 22; Rebs: Orelik 5 Asts: three players 3 PIR: Orelik 28
Pınar Karşıyaka wins series by 178–162

Karşıyaka Arena, Karşıyaka
Attendance: 4,850
Referees: Sreten Radovic (CRO), Elias Koromilas (GRE), Igor Mitrovski (MKD)

11 March 2015
20:45

Boxscore

Virtus Roma (Italy)	66–56	(Turkey) Banvit
Scoring by quarter: 18–18, 13–11, 20–11, 15–16
Pts: Stipčević 23; Rebs: De Zeeuw 6 Asts: Stipčević 6 PIR: Stipčević 23		Pts: Mejía 21; Rebs: Mejía 9 Asts: Davis 3 PIR: Mejía 27
Banvit wins series by 127–121

Palazzetto dello Sport, Rome
Attendance: 1,254
Referees: Antonio Conde (ESP), Milija Vojinovic (SRB), David Romano (ISR)

11 March 2015
20:45

Boxscore

Bayern Munich (Germany)	60–94	(Spain) Valencia Basket
Scoring by quarter: 20–28, 11–22, 10–20, 19–24
Pts: Gavel 14; Rebs: Zipser 7 Asts: Gavel 4 PIR: Zipser 21		Pts: Dublejvić 16; Rebs: Dublejvić 10; Asts: Van Rossom 5 PIR: Dublejvić 25
Valencia Basket wins series by 174–118

Audi Dome, Munich
Attendance: 5,056
Referees: Grzegorz Ziemblicki (POL), Spiros Gkontas (GRE), Sergiy Zashchuk (UKR)

11 March 2015
21:00

Boxscore

Herbalife Gran Canaria (Spain)	75–72	(Croatia) Cedevita
Scoring by quarter: 16–19, 24–20, 21–17, 14–16
Pts: Kuric 20; Rebs: Kendall 7 Asts: Bellas 9 PIR: Kuric 21		Pts: Barać 13; Rebs: three players 4 Asts: Ukić 7 PIR: Barać 17
Herbalife Gran Canaria wins series by 159–148

Gran Canaria Arena, Las Palmas
Attendance: 4,838
Referees: Robert Lottermoser (GER), Joseph Bissang (FRA), Nick van den Broeck (BEL)

== Quarterfinals ==
The eight-finals were two-legged ties determined on aggregate score. The first legs were played on March 17–18 and return legs were played on March 24–25. "Team #1" hosted the second leg.

Team #1	Agg.	Team #2	1st leg	2nd leg
Lokomotiv Kuban (Russia)	145–157	(Russia) UNICS Kazan	87–78	58–79
Pınar Karşıyaka (Turkey)	140–151	(Spain) Herbalife Gran Canaria	66–76	74–75
Banvit (Turkey)	140–138	(France) Paris-Levallois	65–67	75–71
Khimki (Russia)	152–136	(Spain) Valencia Basket	76–75	76–61

=== Game 1 ===
17 March 2015
20:45

Boxscore

Valencia Basket (Spain)	75–76	(Russia) Khimki
Scoring by quarter: 20–17, 15–24, 17–24, 23–11
Pts: Van Rossom 15; Rebs: Aguilar 7 Asts: Ribas 5 PIR: Harangody 16		Pts: Rice 27; Rebs: Honeycutt 7 Asts: Vyaltsev 7 PIR: Rice 27

Pabellón Municipal Fuente de San Luis, Valencia
Attendance: 8,200
Referees: Luigi Lamonica (ITA), Tolga Sahin (ITA), Petros Papapetrou (GRE)

18 March 2015
18:00

Boxscore

UNICS Kazan (Russia)	78–87	(Russia) Lokomotiv Kuban
Scoring by quarter: 23–20, 18–23, 21–26, 16–18
Pts: Langford 19; Rebs: Fischer 10; Asts: Bykov 5 PIR: Langford 16		Pts: Delaney 23; Rebs: Hendrix, Simon 7 Asts: Simon 7 PIR: Simon 27

Basket-Hall Arena, Kazan
Attendance: 3,500
Referees: Daniel Hierrezuelo (ESP), Ersan Kartal (TUR), David Romano (ISR)

18 March 2015
20:00

Boxscore

Paris-Levallois (France)	67–65	(Turkey) Banvit
Scoring by quarter: 16–17, 14–16, 21–18, 16–14
Pts: Schilb 12; Rebs: Ford 8 Asts: Green 11; PIR: Ford 19		Pts: Dragičević 16; Rebs: Dragičević 9 Asts: six players 3 PIR: Dragičević 26

Palais des Sports Marcel-Cerdan, Paris
Attendance: 3,000
Referees: Juan Carlos García González (ESP), Anastasios Piloidis (GRE), Semen Ovinov (RUS)

18 March 2015
21:30

Boxscore

Herbalife Gran Canaria (Spain)	76–66	(Turkey) Pınar Karşıyaka
Scoring by quarter: 22–17, 20–25, 15–13, 19–11
Pts: Oliver 17; Rebs: Báez 9 Asts: four players 2 PIR: Báez 15		Pts: Palacios 18; Rebs: Palacios 6 Asts: Dixon 6 PIR: Palacios 19

Gran Canaria Arena, Las Palmas
Attendance: 4,320
Referees: Milivoje Jovicic (SRB), Olegs Latisevs (LAT), Jurgis Laurinavicius (LTU)

=== Game 2 ===
24 March 2015
18:00

Boxscore

Banvit (Turkey)	75–71	(France) Paris-Levallois
Scoring by quarter: 17–8, 17–24, 15–13, 26–26
Pts: Mejía 18; Rebs: Mejía 9 Asts: Rowland 4 PIR: Mejía 28		Pts: Green 16; Rebs: Ford 7 Asts: Green 9 PIR: Green 27
Banvit wins series by 140–138

Kara Ali Acar Sport Hall, Bandırma
Attendance: 2,850
Referees: José Ramón García Ortiz (ESP), Sreten Radovic (CRO), Sérgio Silva (POR)

25 March 2015
18:00

Boxscore

Lokomotiv Kuban (Russia)	58–79	(Russia) UNICS Kazan
Scoring by quarter: 17–14, 16–20, 11–20, 14–25
Pts: Delaney 16; Rebs: Hendrix 10; Asts: Delaney, Simon 2 PIR: Hendrix 17		Pts: White 29; Rebs: Fischer, White 8 Asts: Kaimakoglou 4 PIR: White 38
UNICS wins series by 157–145

Basket-Hall, Krasnodar
Attendance: 6,136
Referees: Miguel Ángel Pérez Pérez (ESP), Antonio Conde (ESP), Amit Balak (ISR)

25 March 2015
18:00

Boxscore

Khimki (Russia)	76–61	(Spain) Valencia Basket
Scoring by quarter: 21–20, 21–16, 20–11, 14–14
Pts: Rice 18; Rebs: Honeycutt 9 Asts: Rice 10; PIR: Rice 22		Pts: Dubljević 15; Rebs: Dubljević 7 Asts: Vives 3 PIR: Dubljević 17
Khimki wins series by 152–136

Basketball Center, Khimki
Attendance: 4,250
Referees: Ilija Belosevic (MNE), Carmelo Paternico (ITA), David Romano (ISR)

25 March 2015
19:00

Boxscore

Pınar Karşıyaka (Turkey)	74–75	(Spain) Herbalife Gran Canaria
Scoring by quarter: 19–19, 13–22, 21–18, 21–16
Pts: Dixon 24; Rebs: Strawberry 9 Asts: Dixon 5 PIR: Dixon 24		Pts: Newley 15; Rebs: Newley 6 Asts: Newley 3, O'Leary 3 PIR: Newley 20
Herbalife Gran Canaria wins series by 151–140

Karşıyaka Arena, Karşıyaka
Attendance: 4,850
Referees: Sasa Pukl (SLO), Spiros Gkontas (GRE), Marcin Kowalski (POL)

== Semifinals ==
Team #1	Agg.	Team #2	1st leg	2nd leg
Herbalife Gran Canaria (Spain)	161–146	(Russia) UNICS Kazan	83–70	78–76
Khimki (Russia)	175–172	(Turkey) Banvit	82–83	93–89

=== Game 1 ===
1 April 2015
19:15

Boxscore

UNICS Kazan (Russia)	70–83	(Spain) Herbalife Gran Canaria
Scoring by quarter: 11–26, 23–17, 21–21, 15–19
Pts: Bykov 17; Rebs: Kaimakoglou 6 Asts: Bykov 8 PIR: Bykov 20		Pts: three players 12; Rebs: Tavares 11; Asts: Bellas 9 PIR: Tavares 30

Basket-Hall Arena, Kazan
Attendance: 3,500
Referees: Ilija Belosevic (SRB), Tolga Sahin (ITA), Damir Javor (SLO)

1 April 2015
19:45

Boxscore

Banvit (Turkey)	83–82	(Russia) Khimki
Scoring by quarter: 22–19, 18–17, 20–23, 23–23
Pts: Rowland 21; Rebs: Simmons 7 Asts: Mejía 4 PIR: Rowland 23		Pts: Rice 22; Rebs: Augustine 10; Asts: Rice 7 PIR: Rice 23

Kara Ali Acar Sport Hall, Bandırma
Attendance: 2,850
Referees: Paolo Taurino (ITA), Vicente Bultó (ESP), Carlos Cortés (ESP)

=== Game 2 ===
8 April 2015
18:30

Boxscore

Khimki (Russia)	93–89	(Turkey) Banvit
Scoring by quarter: 20–15, 22–20, 23–25, 28–29
Pts: Rice 28; Rebs: Augustine, Honeycutt 9 Asts: Monia 5 PIR: Augustine, Rice 22		Pts: Mejía 25; Rebs: four players 5 Asts: Davis 5 PIR: Mejía 29
Khimki wins series by 175–172

Basketball Center, Khimki
Attendance: 3,750
Referees: Christos Christodolou (GRE), Matej Boltauzer (SLO), Carlos Peruga (ESP)

8 April 2015
21:00

Boxscore

Herbalife Gran Canaria (Spain)	78–76	(Russia) UNICS Kazan
Scoring by quarter: 22–21, 18–15, 20–23, 18–17
Pts: Kendall 17; Rebs: Báez 11; Asts: Bellas 5 PIR: Báez, Kendall 18		Pts: White 20; Rebs: Fischer 6 Asts: Bykov 5 PIR: Fischer 21
Herbalife Gran Canaria wins series by 161–146

Gran Canaria Arena, Las Palmas
Attendance: 8,015
Referees: Recep Ankarali (TUR), Jakub Zamojski (POL), Panagiotis Anastopoulos (GRE)

== Finals ==
Team #1	Agg.	Team #2	1st leg	2nd leg
Khimki (Russia)	174–130	(Spain) Herbalife Gran Canaria	91–66	83–64

=== Game 1 ===
24 April 2015
20:45

Boxscore

Herbalife Gran Canaria (Spain)	66–91	(Russia) Khimki
Scoring by quarter: 19–21, 14–19, 21–19, 12–32
Pts: Kuric 23; Rebs: Báez 7 Asts: Oliver 4 PIR: Kuric 21		Pts: Koponen, Vyaltsev 18; Rebs: three players 6 Asts: Rice 5 PIR: Davis 22

Gran Canaria Arena, Las Palmas
Attendance: 9,875
Referees: Fernando Rocha (POR), Roberto Chiari (ITA), Rüştü Nuran (TUR)

=== Game 2 ===
29 April 2015
18:30

Boxscore

Khimki (Russia)	83–64	(Spain) Herbalife Gran Canaria
Scoring by quarter: 27–18, 18–12, 23–16, 15–18
Pts: Augustine 18; Rebs: Davis 10; Asts: Popović 7 PIR: Davis 20		Pts: Tavares 17; Rebs: Tavares 10; Asts: Kendall 3 PIR: Tavares 23
Khimki wins series by 174–130

Basketball Center, Khimki
Attendance: 3,850
Referees: Sasa Pukl (SLO), Milivoje Jovcic (SRB), Ioannis Foufis (GRE)
