= Eurocup Basketball 2013–14 Last 32 Group M =

Standings and Results for Group L of the Last 32 phase of the 2013–14 Eurocup basketball tournament.

== Standings ==
	Team	Pld	W	L	PF	PA	Diff	Tie-break
1.	(Israel) Hapoel Jerusalem	6	4	2	507	489	+18	1–1 (+1)
2.	(Ukraine) Budivelnyk Kyiv	6	4	2	500	491	+9	1–1 (–1)
3.	(Turkey) Banvit	6	3	3	478	465	+13	
4.	(Slovenia) Union Olimpija	6	1	5	451	491	–40	

== Fixtures and results ==
=== Game 1 ===
8 January 2014
18:15 CET

Boxscore

Banvit (Turkey)	92–85	(Ukraine) Budivelnyk Kyiv
Scoring by quarter: 29–24, 28–22, 25–16, 10–23
Pts: Davis 20; Rebs: Davis 8 Asts: Marković 5		Pts: Ahearn 22; Rebs: three players 4 Asts: Strēlnieks 5

Banvit Kara Ali Acar Sport Hall, Bandırma
Attendance: 2,200
Referees: Andrej Jersan (SLO), Seffi Shemmesh (ISR), Marko Juras (SRB)

8 January 2014
20:30 CET

Boxscore

Union Olimpija (Slovenia)	66–69	(Israel) Hapoel Jerusalem
Scoring by quarter: 14–21, 20–15, 13–16, 19–17
Pts: Salin 19; Rebs: Stepheson 8 Asts: Jackson 3		Pts: Kitchen 14; Rebs: Dupree, Parakhouski 8 Asts: Kitchen 5

Arena Stožice, Ljubljana
Attendance: 5,200
Referees: Anastasios Piloidis (GRE), Ersan Kartal (TUR), Miroslav Tomov (BUL)

=== Game 2 ===
15 January 2014
18:00 CET

Boxscore

Budivelnyk Kyiv (Ukraine)	88–76	(Slovenia) Union Olimpija
Scoring by quarter: 24–23, 28–21, 21–19, 15–13
Pts: Lavrinovič 23; Rebs: Lavrinovič 8 Asts: Strēlnieks 7		Pts: Omić 21; Rebs: Rupnik 7 Asts: Gailius 7

Kyiv Sports Palace, Kyiv
Attendance: 1,500
Referees: Juan Carlos Garcia Gonzalez (ESP), Petri Mantyla (FIN), Aare Halliko (FIN)

15 January 2014
18:30 CET

Boxscore

Hapoel Jerusalem (Israel)	92–73	(Turkey) Banvit
Scoring by quarter: 21–26, 27–18, 22–15, 22–14
Pts: Duncan, Wright 17; Rebs: Duncan 12; Asts: Halperin 6		Pts: Rowland 22; Rebs: Davis, Simmons 7 Asts: Davis 5

Malha Arena, Jerusalem
Attendance: 2,000
Referees: Elias Koromilas (GRE), Damir Javor (SLO), Uros Obrknezevic (SRB)

=== Game 3 ===
22 January 2014
18:30 CET

Boxscore

Hapoel Jerusalem (Israel)	88–84	(Ukraine) Budivelnyk Kyiv
Scoring by quarter: 20–26, 31–30, 16–15, 21–13
Pts: Duncan 20; Rebs: Eliyahu, Wright 6 Asts: Halperin 10		Pts: Ahearn 16; Rebs: Summers 12; Asts: Minard 8

Malha Arena, Jerusalem
Attendance: 2,000
Referees: Sasa Pukl (SLO), Petar Obradovic (BIH), Moritz Reiter (GER)

22 January 2014
20:30 CET

Boxscore

Union Olimpija (Slovenia)	84–80	(Turkey) Banvit
Scoring by quarter: 20–26, 22–16, 22–26, 20–12
Pts: Bubnić 18; Rebs: Bubnić 6 Asts: Marinelli 5		Pts: Mejia 26; Rebs: Rowland 7 Asts: Davis 4

Arena Stožice, Ljubljana
Attendance: 5,200
Referees: Miguel Perez Perez (ESP), Marek Cmikiewicz (POL), Arnis Ozols (LAT)

=== Game 4 ===
29 January 2014
18:00 CET

Boxscore

Budivelnyk Kyiv (Ukraine)	96–93	(Israel) Hapoel Jerusalem
Scoring by quarter: 25–31, 26–19, 22–23, 23–20
Pts: Summers 21; Rebs: Summers 7 Asts: Minard 7		Pts: Parakhouski 19; Rebs: Eliyahu 10; Asts: Halperin 12

Kyiv Sports Palace, Kyiv
Attendance: 1,800
Referees: Grzegorz Ziemblicki (POL), Andrej Lovsin (SLO), Tomislav Hordov (CRO)

29 January 2014
18:00 CET

Boxscore

Banvitspor (Turkey)	81–65	(Slovenia) Union Olimpija
Scoring by quarter: 23–11, 20–23, 20–21, 18–10
Pts: Rowland 22; Rebs: Davis 7 Asts: Mejia 5		Pts: Gailius 27; Rebs: Omić, Jackson 7 Asts: Joksimović 3

Banvit Kara Ali Acar Sport Hall, Bandırma
Attendance: 2,950
Referees: Spiros Gkontas (GRE), Piotr Pastusiak (POL), Semen Ovinov (RUS)

=== Game 5 ===
12 February 2014
18:00 CET

Boxscore

Budivelnyk Kyiv (Ukraine)	60–59	(Turkey) Banvit
Scoring by quarter: 20–16, 15–12, 13–17, 12–14
Pts: Strēlnieks 13; Rebs: Lavrinovič 9 Asts: Strēlnieks 3		Pts: Rowland 16; Rebs: Mejia 7 Asts: Mejia 3

Kyiv Sports Palace, Kyiv
Attendance: 2,100
Referees: Olegs Latisevs (LAT), Miguel Angel Perez Niz (ESP), Oskars Lucis (LAT)

12 February 2014
18:30 CET

Boxscore

Hapoel Jerusalem (Israel)	86–77	(Slovenia) Union Olimpija
Scoring by quarter: 24–16, 22–19, 22–27, 18–15
Pts: Duncan 21; Rebs: Dupree 10; Asts: Halperin 9		Pts: Joksimović 19; Rebs: Brodnik 8 Asts: Joksimović 6

Malha Arena, Jerusalem
Attendance: 2,000
Referees: Anastasios Piloidis (GRE), Ersan Kartal (TUR), Alexey davydov (RUS)

=== Game 6 ===
19 February 2014
18:00 CET

Boxscore

Banvit (Turkey)	93–79	(Israel) Hapoel Jerusalem
Scoring by quarter: 26–17, 25–23, 24–25, 18–14
Pts: Simmons 21; Rebs: Aminu 6 Asts: Marković 6		Pts: Wright 17; Rebs: Parakhouski 9 Asts: Wright 4

Banvit Kara Ali Acar Sport Hall, Bandırma
Attendance: 2,800
Referees: Christos Christodoulou (GRE), Carlos Peruga (ESP), Aare Halliko (EST)

19 February 2014
20:30 CET

Boxscore

Union Olimpija (Slovenia)	83–87	(Ukraine) Budivelnyk Kyiv
Scoring by quarter: 17–22, 23–23, 22–19, 21–23
Pts: Gailius, Omić 21; Rebs: Murić 14; Asts: Rupnik 3		Pts: 3 players 18; Rebs: Lavrinovič, Summers 5 Asts: Lavrinovič 5

Arena Stožice, Ljubljana
Attendance: 2,600
Referees: Luis Lopes (POR), Carmelo Paternico (ITA), Oscar Perea (ESP)
