= Eurocup Basketball 2010–11 Regular Season Group A =

Standings and results for Group A of the regular season phase of the 2010–11 Eurocup basketball tournament.

== Standings ==
Key to colors
Top two places in each group advanced to Last 16

	Team	Pld	W	L	PF	PA	Diff
1.	(Russia) UNICS Kazan	6	5	1	507	379	+128
2.	(France) Le Mans	6	4	2	426	429	−3
3.	(Turkey) Banvit BK	6	2	4	402	474	−72
4.	(Germany) EWE Oldenburg	6	1	5	435	488	−53

Source: Euroleague Basketball

== Fixtures and results ==
All times given below are in Central European Time.

=== Game 1 ===
16 November 2010
18:00

Report

Banvit BK (Turkey)	78–70	(France) Le Mans
Scoring by quarter: 16–16, 21–14, 19–19, 22–21
Pts: Simmons 16; Rebs: Simmons, Golubović 9 Asts: Ermiş 9		Pts: Batista 20; Rebs: Batista 10; Asts: Dewar, Diot 4

Banvit Kara Ali Acar Sport Hall
Attendance: 2,205
Referees: Paolo Taurino (ITA), Sasa Marcic (SRB), Sergey Mikhaylov (RUS)

16 November 2010
20:00

Report

EWE Oldenburg (Germany)	72–89	(Russia) UNICS Kazan
Scoring by quarter: 18–27, 19–20, 16–18, 19–24
Pts: Baynes, Paulding 17; Rebs: Lukauskis, Paulding 4 Asts: Campbell 5		Pts: Popović 23; Rebs: Lampe 9 Asts: Popović 10

EWE Arena
Attendance: 1,750
Referees: Dani Hierrezuelo (ESP), Arnis Ozols (LAT), Anna Cardus (ESP)

=== Game 2 ===
23 November 2010
17:00

Report

UNICS Kazan (Russia)	80–52	(Turkey) Banvit BK
Scoring by quarter: 27–13, 23–12, 18–14, 12–13
Pts: Lyday 19; Rebs: Lampe 9 Asts: Popović 7		Pts: Golubović 14; Rebs: Golubović 9 Asts: Ermiş 4

Basket-Hall Arena
Attendance: 4,000
Referees: Volodymr Drabikovsky (UKR), Marko Juras (SRB), Sergiy Zashchuck (UKR)

23 November 2010
20:30

Report

Le Mans (France)	84–60	(Germany) EWE Oldenburg
Scoring by quarter: 22–8, 19–16, 26–20, 17–16
Pts: Acker 21; Rebs: Koffi 9 Asts: Diot 6		Pts: Lukauskis, Campbell 10; Rebs: Stević 7 Asts: Lukauskis 4

Antarès
Attendance: 3,600
Referees: Antonio Conde (ESP), Anna Cardus (ESP), Petar Obradovic (BIH)

=== Game 3 ===
30 November 2010
17:00

Report

UNICS Kazan (Russia)	63–67	(France) Le Mans
Scoring by quarter: 24–8, 14–20, 8–21, 17–18
Pts: Popović 21; Rebs: Lampe 8 Asts: Popović 4		Pts: Diot, Batista 14; Rebs: Koffi 7 Asts: Diot 4

Basket-Hall Arena
Attendance: 2,000
Referees: Jose Ramon Gasrcia Ortiz (ESP), Spiros Gkontas (GRE), Olegs Latisevs (LAT)

30 November 2010
20:00

Report

EWE Oldenburg (Germany)	96–73	(Turkey) Banvit BK
Scoring by quarter: 22–24, 25–22, 23–14, 26–13
Pts: Baynes 17; Rebs: Baynes 8 Asts: Lukauskis 8		Pts: Graves, Lance Williams 13; Rebs: Chuck, Graves 4 Asts: Ermiş, Chuck 3

EWE Arena
Attendance: 1,911
Referees: Juan Carlos Mitjana (ESP), Robert Vyklicky (CZE), Haris Bijedic (BIH)

=== Game 4 ===
7 December 2010
18:00

Report

Banvit BK (Turkey)	81–72	(Germany) EWE Oldenburg
Scoring by quarter: 16–17, 25–14, 19–22, 21–19
Pts: Graves 14; Rebs: Williams 8 Asts: Graves 4		Pts: Baynes, Paulding 21; Rebs: Stević 9 Asts: Lukauskis, Campbell 4

Banvit Kara Ali Acar Sport Hall
Attendance: 2,346
Referees: Christos Christodoulou (GRE), Ademir Zurapovic (BIH), Miroslav Tomov (BUL)

7 December 2010
20:30

Report

Le Mans (France)	65–98	(Russia) UNICS Kazan
Scoring by quarter: 15–24, 19–26, 15–26, 16–22
Pts: Acker 17; Rebs: Batista 6 Asts: Pellin 4		Pts: Lampe 23; Rebs: Lampe 6 Asts: Popović 7

Antarès
Attendance: 4,800
Referees: Jakub Zamojski (POL), Miguel Angel Perez Niz (ESP), Marcin Kowalski (POL)

=== Game 5 ===
14 December 2010
17:00

Report

UNICS Kazan (Russia)	88–64	(Germany) EWE Oldenburg
Scoring by quarter: 24–19, 23–17, 19–13, 22–15
Pts: Lyday 25; Rebs: Lampe 14; Asts: Samoylenko 7		Pts: McNaughton 11; Rebs: Stević 9 Asts: Lukauskis 7

Basket-Hall Arena
Attendance: 2,500
Referees: Murat Biricik (TUR), Sergiy Chebyshev (UKR), Oskars Lucis (LAT)

14 December 2010
20:30

Report

Le Mans (France)	67–59	(Turkey) Banvit BK
Scoring by quarter: 16–17, 16–21, 14–9, 21–12
Pts: Diot 19; Rebs: Koffi 7 Asts: Diot 7		Pts: Graves 17; Rebs: Paçun 8 Asts: Edge 3

Antarès
Attendance: 4,900
Referees: Jose Martin (ESP), Renaud Geller (BEL), Oscar Pera (ESP)

=== Game 6 ===
21 December 2010
20:00

Report

EWE Oldenburg (Germany)	71–73	(France) Le Mans
Scoring by quarter: 18–22, 23–16, 13–26, 17–9
Pts: Lukauskis 21; Rebs: McNaughton 10; Asts: Gill 5		Pts: Dewar 17; Rebs: three players 6 Asts: Acker 6

EWE Arena
Attendance: 2,333
Referees: Carl Jungebrand (FIN), Jurgis Laurinavicius (LTU), Igor Dragojevic (MNE)

21 December 2010
20:00

Report

Banvit BK (Turkey)	59–89	(Russia) UNICS Kazan
Scoring by quarter: 21–28, 12–24, 15–15, 11–22
Pts: Akpinar, Golubović 13; Rebs: Golubović 5 Asts: Ermiş 6		Pts: McCarty 17; Rebs: Rizvić 6 Asts: Minard 7

Banvit Kara Ali Acar Sport Hall
Attendance: 1,850
Referees: Matej Boltauzer (SLO), Omer Esteron (ISR), Panagiotis Anastopoulos (GRE)
