= Eurocup Basketball 2012–13 Regular Season Group B =

Standings and Results for Group B of the Regular Season phase of the 2012–13 Eurocup basketball tournament.

== Standings ==
All times are CET (UTC+1).

Key to colors
| Top two teams advance to Last 16 |

| | Team | Pld | W | L | PF | PA | Diff | Tie-break |
|---|---|---|---|---|---|---|---|---|
| 1. | (Spain) Uxúe Bilbao Basket | 6 | 6 | 0 | 490 | 421 | +69 | |
| 2. | (Montenegro) KK Budućnost VOLI | 6 | 4 | 2 | 418 | 388 | +30 | |
| 3. | (Bulgaria) PBC Lukoil Academic | 6 | 2 | 4 | 423 | 452 | –29 | |
| 4. | (Belgium) Belgacom Spirou | 6 | 0 | 6 | 397 | 467 | –70 | |

=== Game 1 ===
7 November 2012
17:00

Report

| PBC Lukoil Academic (Bulgaria) | 93–75 | (Belgium) Belgacom Spirou |
Scoring by quarter: 26–19, 29–19, 24–18, 14–19
| Pts: Abukar 23; Rebs: Watkins 5 Asts: Heath 6 | | Pts: Allen, Foster 17; Rebs: Walsh 4 Asts: Walsh 5 |

Universiada Hall, Sofia
Attendance: 1,000
Referees: Sreten Radovic (CRO), Apostolos Kalpakas (SWE), Ingus Baumanis (LAT)

7 November 2012
20:15

Report

| Uxúe Bilbao Basket (Spain) | 85–78 (OT) | (Montenegro) KK Budućnost VOLI |
Scoring by quarter: 12–22, 19–18, 12–16, 28–15, Overtime: 14–7
| Pts: Hamilton 20; Rebs: Hervelle 11; Asts: Zisis 6 | | Pts: Lee 17; Rebs: Milošević 7 Asts: Lee 3 |

Bilbao Arena, Bilbao
Attendance: 6,702
Referees: Tolga Şahin (ITA), Oliver Krause (GER), Arnis Ozols (LAT)

=== Game 2 ===
13 November 2012
20:30

Report

| Belgacom Spirou (Belgium) | 69–85 | (Spain) Uxúe Bilbao Basket |
Scoring by quarter: 17–23, 17–18, 12–27, 23–17
| Pts: Walsh 26; Rebs: Three players 4 Asts: Walsh 4 | | Pts: Vasileiadis 17; Rebs: Hervelle 8 Asts: Zisis 9 |

Spiroudome, Charleroi
Attendance: 4,500
Referees: Anastasios Piloidis (GRE), Sefei Shemmesh (ISR), Carmelo Paternico (ITA)

14 November 2012
18:30

Report

| KK Budućnost VOLI (Montenegro) | 75–72 | (Bulgaria) PBC Lukoil Academic |
Scoring by quarter: 23–19, 20–24, 17–17, 15–12
| Pts: Vitkovac 16; Rebs: Milošević 11; Asts: Milošević, Vitkovac 3 | | Pts: Abukar 15; Rebs: Watkins, Abukar 4 Asts: Heath 4 |

Morača Sports Center, Podgorica
Attendance: 1,400
Referees: Luigi Lamonica (ITA), Robert Vyklicky (CZE), Ioannis Foufis (GRE)

=== Game 3 ===
20 November 2012
20:30

Report

| Belgacom Spirou (Belgium) | 53–66 | (Montenegro) KK Budućnost VOLI |
Scoring by quarter: 14–14, 11–19, 18–19, 10–14
| Pts: Janković 15; Rebs: Janković 8 Asts: Walsh 4 | | Pts: Bost 13; Rebs: Vitkovac 11; Asts: Vitkovac 3 |

Spiroudome, Charleroi
Attendance: 2,500
Referees: Fernando Rocha (POR), Oskars Lucis (LAT), Lahdo Sharro (SWE)

21 November 2012
17:00

Report

| PBC Lukoil Academic (Bulgaria) | 64–85 | (Spain) Uxúe Bilbao Basket |
Scoring by quarter: 25–23, 17–20, 9–21, 13–21
| Pts: Green 13; Rebs: Green 11; Asts: Heath 7 | | Pts: Hamilton 19; Rebs: Raković 10; Asts: Mumbrú 8 |

Armeets Arena, Sofia
Attendance: 1,300
Referees: Srdan Dozai (CRO), Sinisa Herceg (CRO), Marius Ciulin (ROM)

=== Game 4 ===
28 November 2012
18:30

Report

| KK Budućnost VOLI (Montenegro) | 59–55 | (Belgium) Belgacom Spirou |
Scoring by quarter: 20–23, 15–11, 16–7, 8–14
| Pts: Bost 16; Rebs: Vitkovac 9 Asts: Vitkovac 5 | | Pts: Fontenet 19; Rebs: Riddick 7 Asts: Fontenet 3 |

Morača Sports Center, Podgorica
Attendance: 1,100
Referees: Murat Biricik (TUR), Miroslav Tomov (BUL), Gentian Cici (ALB)

28 November 2012
20:15

Report

| Uxúe Bilbao Basket (Spain) | 82–60 | (Bulgaria) PBC Lukoil Academic |
Scoring by quarter: 17–20, 23–9, 24–18, 18–13
| Pts: Vasileiadis 20; Rebs: Raković 8 Asts: López 4 | | Pts: Heath 18; Rebs: Green 10; Asts: Green, Marinov, Stoykov 2 |

Bilbao Arena, Bilbao
Attendance: 6,692
Referees: Fernando Rocha (POR), Jurgis Laurinavicius (LTU), Saso Petek (SLO)

=== Game 5 ===
4 December 2012
20:30

Report

| Belgacom Spirou (Belgium) | 61–79 | (Bulgaria) PBC Lukoil Academic |
Scoring by quarter: 13–29, 15–18, 21–13, 12–19
| Pts: Walsh 14; Rebs: Allen 8 Asts: Fontenet 6 | | Pts: Green 22; Rebs: Watkins 9 Asts: Heath 7 |

Spiroudome, Charleroi
Attendance: 500
Referees: Eddie Viator (FRA), Miguel Angel Perez Niz (ESP), Marko Juras (SRB)

5 December 2012
20:15

Report

| KK Budućnost VOLI (Montenegro) | 66–68 | (Spain) Uxúe Bilbao Basket |
Scoring by quarter: 23–24, 16–19, 18–9, 9–16
| Pts: Vitkovac 15; Rebs: Milošević 13; Asts: Mihailović 4 | | Pts: Zisis, Hamilton 14; Rebs: Mumbrú 8 Asts: Grimau 5 |

Morača Sports Center, Podgorica
Attendance: 2,100
Referees: Emin Mogulkoc (TUR), Omer Esteron (ISR), Tomasz Trawicki (POL)

=== Game 6 ===
12 December 2012
20:30

Report

| PBC Lukoil Academic (Bulgaria) | 55–74 | (Montenegro) KK Budućnost VOLI |
Scoring by quarter: 15–15, 18–13, 14–26, 8–20
| Pts: Heath 18; Rebs: Heath 8 Asts: Heath, Stoykov 3 | | Pts: Lee 18; Rebs: Popović 7 Asts: Bost 7 |

Armeets Arena, Sofia
Attendance: 2,500
Referees: Recep Ankarali (TUR), Seffi Shemmesh (ISR), Elias Koromilas (GRE)

12 December 2012
20:30

Report

| Uxúe Bilbao Basket (Spain) | 85–84 | (Belgium) Belgacom Spirou |
Scoring by quarter: 16–14, 17–21, 27–21, 25–28
| Pts: Hamilton 22; Rebs: Hamilton, Hervelle 7 Asts: Zisis 5 | | Pts: Walsh 27; Rebs: Walsh 14; Asts: Walsh 6 |

Bilbao Arena, Bilbao
Attendance: 6,098
Referees: Luis Lopes (POR), Apostolos Kalpakas (SWE), Petri Mantyla (FIN)
