= 2012–13 Eurocup Basketball Knockout Stage =

The 2012–13 Eurocup Basketball Knockout stage was the last phase in the competition. Quarterfinals started on March 6 and the Final was played on April 13.

All times are CET (UTC+1).

== Bracket ==
Quarterfinals
(Spain) Uxúe Bilbao	81	101	182
(Germany) ratiopharm Ulm	81	78	159
(Ukraine) Budivelnyk	72	73	145
(Russia) Spartak St. Petersburg	83	56	139
(Russia) UNICS	70	71	141
(Spain) Valencia	80	68	148
(Russia) Lokomotiv Kuban	72	90	162
(Montenegro) Budućnost VOLI	54	65	119

Semifinals
(Spain) Uxúe Bilbao	93	75	168
(Ukraine) Budivelnyk	83	53	136
(Spain) Valencia	87	68	155
(Russia) Lokomotiv Kuban	97	63	160

Finals
13 April – Charleroi
(Spain) Uxúe Bilbao	64
(Russia) Lokomotiv Kuban	75

== Quarterfinals ==
The quarterfinals were two-legged ties determined on aggregate score. The first legs were played on March 6 and return legs were played on March 13. The group winner in each tie, listed as "Team #1", hosted the second leg.

Team #1	Agg.	Team #2	1st leg	2nd leg
BC Budivelnyk Kyiv (Ukraine)	145–139	(Russia) BC Spartak Saint Petersburg	72–83	73–56
Uxúe Bilbao Basket (Spain)	182–163	(Germany) Ratiopharm Ulm	81–85	101–78
PBC Lokomotiv-Kuban (Russia)	162–119	(Montenegro) KK Budućnost VOLI	72–54	90–65
BC UNICS Kazan (Russia)	141–148	(Spain) Valencia BC	70–80	71–68

=== Game 1 ===
5 March 2013
21:30

Report

Ratiopharm Ulm (Germany)	85–81	(Spain) Uxúe Bilbao Basket
Scoring by quarter: 18–30, 24–15, 18–13, 25–23
Pts: Bryant 30; Rebs: Nankivil 8 Asts: Günther 7		Pts: Vasileiadis 21; Rebs: Hamilton, Hervelle 6 Asts: Mumbrú 5

Arena Ulm/Neu-Ulm, Neu-Ulm
Attendance: 5,500
Referees: Milivoje Jovcic (SRB), Tomas Jasevicius (LTU), Milija Vojinovic (SRB)

6 March 2013
17:00

Report

BC Spartak Saint Petersburg (Russia)	83–72	(Ukraine) BC Budivelnyk Kyiv
Scoring by quarter: 23–19, 20–17, 20–24, 20–12
Pts: Wright 18; Rebs: Kurbanov 11; Asts: Strēlnieks 7		Pts: Lyons 21; Rebs: Lyons 7 Asts: Tsintsadze 4

Yubileyny Sports Palace, Saint Petersburg
Attendance: 800
Referees: Sreten Radovic (CRO), Olegs Latisevs (LAT), Robert Vyklicky (CZE)

6 March 2013
19:00

Report

KK Budućnost VOLI (Montenegro)	54–72	(Russia) PBC Lokomotiv-Kuban
Scoring by quarter: 15–8, 13–17, 8–26, 18–21
Pts: Vitkovac 14; Rebs: Vitkovac, Bunić 7 Asts: Four players 1		Pts: Brown 17; Rebs: Brown 8 Asts: Kalnietis 7

Morača Sports Center, Podgorica
Attendance: 3,100
Referees: Guerrino Cerebuch (ITA), Emilio Perez Pizarro (ESP), Segiy Zashchuk (UKR)

6 March 2013
20:30

Report

Valencia BC (Spain)	80–70	(Russia) BC UNICS Kazan
Scoring by quarter: 21–20, 24–15, 19–23, 16–12
Pts: Dubljević 19; Rebs: Doellman 8 Asts: Marković, Ribas 5		Pts: Lyday 28; Rebs: Chatman 8 Asts: Eidson 4

Pabellón Municipal Fuente San Luis, Valencia
Attendance: 6,500
Referees: Tolga Sahin (ITA), Luis Lopes (POR), Anastasios Piloidis (GRE)

=== Game 2 ===
12 March 2013
20:30

Report

Uxúe Bilbao Basket (Spain)	101–78	(Germany) Ratiopharm Ulm
Scoring by quarter: 28–30, 29–17, 21–16, 23–15
Pts: Zisis 23; Rebs: Hamilton 9 Asts: Hervelle 3		Pts: Bryant 21; Rebs: Bryant 8 Asts: Bryant 4

Bilbao Arena, Bilbao
Attendance: 8,693
Referees: Fernando Rocha (POR), Tolga Sahin (ITA), Joseph Bissang (FRA)

Uxúe Bilbao Basket won 182–163 on aggregate

13 March 2013
16:00

Report

BC UNICS Kazan (Russia)	71–68	(Spain) Valencia BC
Scoring by quarter: 20-14, 15-17, 19-22, 17-15
Pts: Eidson 18; Rebs: Eidson 8 Asts: Chatman 4		Pts: Ribas 16; Rebs: Marković 7 Asts: Marković 5

Basket-Hall Arena, Kazan
Attendance: 3,500
Referees: Ilija Belosevic (SRB), Recep Ankarali (TUR), Seffi Shemmesh (ISR)

Valencia BC won 148–141 on aggregate

13 March 2013
16:30

Report

PBC Lokomotiv-Kuban (Russia)	90–65	(Montenegro) KK Budućnost VOLI
Scoring by quarter: 29–16, 16–21, 26-16, 19-12
Pts: Jasaitis 23; Rebs: Savrasenko, Calathes 6 Asts: Kalnietis 6		Pts: Popović 14; Rebs: Milošević 5 Asts: Vitkovac 3

Basket Hall, Krasnodar
Attendance: 4,200
Referees: J. Martín (ESP), R. Nuran (TUR), M. Tomov (BUL)

PBC Lokomotiv-Kuban won 162–119 on aggregate

13 March 2013
18:00

Report

BC Budivelnyk Kyiv (Ukraine)	73–56	(Russia) BC Spartak Saint Petersburg
Scoring by quarter: 13-19, 24–9, 17–21, 19–7
Pts: Delaney 17; Rebs: Drozdov 12; Asts: four players 3		Pts: Mavrokefalidis 21; Rebs: Wright 8 Asts: Strēlnieks 6

Palace of Sports, Kyiv
Attendance: 3,000
Referees: D. Hierrezuelo (ESP), S. Gkontas (GRE), P. Mantyla(FIN)

BC Budivelnyk Kyiv won 145–139 on aggregate

== Semifinals ==
The semifinals were two-legged ties determined on aggregate score. The first legs were played on March 20 and return legs were played on March 26–27. The team finishing in the higher Last 16 place, listed as "Team #1", hosted the second leg.

Team #1	Agg.	Team #2	1st leg	2nd leg
Uxúe Bilbao Basket (Spain)	168–136	(Ukraine) BC Budivelnyk Kyiv	93–83	75–53
PBC Lokomotiv-Kuban (Russia)	160–155	(Spain) Valencia BC	97–87	63–68

=== Game 1 ===
20 March 2013
18:30

Report

BC Budivelnyk Kyiv (Ukraine)	83–93	(Spain) Uxúe Bilbao Basket
Scoring by quarter: 19–20, 25–28, 17–23, 22–22
Pts: Delaney 38; Rebs: Delaney 8 Asts: Tsintsadze 7		Pts: Hamilton 26; Rebs: Hamilton 8 Asts: Mumbrú 7

Palace of Sports, Kyiv
Attendance: 5,200
Referees: Srdan Dozai (CRO), Carmelo Paternico (ITA), Apostolos Kalpakas (SWE)

20 March 2013
20:30

Report

Valencia BC (Spain)	87–97	(Russia) PBC Lokomotiv-Kuban
Scoring by quarter: 21-29, 22-16, 15-31, 29-21
Pts: Doellman 28; Rebs: Marković, Doellman 4 Asts: San Miguel 4		Pts: Jasaitis 23; Rebs: Jasaitis 8 Asts: Calathes 9

Fuente San Luis, Valencia
Attendance: 8,200
Referees: Borys Ryzhyk (UKR), Eddie Viator (FRA), Panagiotis Anastopoulos (GRE)

=== Game 2 ===
27 March 2013
20:00

Report

Uxúe Bilbao Basket (Spain)	75–53	(Ukraine) BC Budivelnyk Kyiv
Scoring by quarter: 20-14, 17-9, 16-19, 22-11
Pts: Hamilton, Mumbrú 13; Rebs: Samb 6 Asts: Zisis 5		Pts: Lyons 20; Rebs: Drozdov 7 Asts: Tsintsadze 2

Bilbao Arena, Bilbao
Attendance: 10,006
Referees: Christos Christodoulou (GRE), Marcin Kowalski (POL), Roberto Chiari (ITA)

Uxúe Bilbao Basket won 168–136 on aggregate

26 March 2013
17:00

Report

PBC Lokomotiv-Kuban (Russia)	63–68	(Spain) Valencia BC
Scoring by quarter: 16-15, 10-13, 11-15, 26-25
Pts: Calathes 19; Rebs: Kalnietis, Calathes 7 Asts: Baron 2		Pts: Marković, Dubljević 14; Rebs: Dubljević 11; Asts: Marković 6

Basket Hall, Krasnodar
Attendance: 7,481
Referees: Luigi Lamonica (ITA), Boris Shulga (UKR), Gianluca Mattioli (ITA)

PBC Lokomotiv-Kuban won 160–155 on aggregate

== Final ==
The final took place on April 13, 2013, in Spiroudome, Charleroi, Belgium.

Team #1	Result	Team #2
Uxúe Bilbao Basket (Spain)	64–75	(Russia) PBC Lokomotiv-Kuban

=== Final game ===
13 April 2013
21:00

Report

Uxúe Bilbao Basket (Spain)	64–75	(Russia) PBC Lokomotiv-Kuban
Scoring by quarter: 17-16, 13-22, 15-16, 19-21
Pts: Vasileiadis 16; Rebs: Three players 6 Asts: López 4		Pts: Hendrix 14; Rebs: Marić 10; Asts: Calathes 7

Spiroudome, Charleroi
Attendance: 3,862
Referees: Fernando Rocha (POR), Tolga Sahin (ITA), Robert Lottermoser (GER)
