= Türkoğlu (surname) =

Türkoğlu is a Turkish surname. Notable people with the surname include:

- Aysu Türkoğlu (born 2001), Turkish women's long-distance swimmer
- Beyza İrem Türkoğlu (born 1997), Turkish women's handball player
- Ece Türkoğlu (born 1999), Turkish women's footballer
- Hedo Türkoğlu (born 1979), Turkish men's basketball player
- Ümit Türkoğlu (born 1981), Turkish men's basketball player
