= TUBAD Mehmet Baturalp Tournament =

Banvit TUBAD Basketball Tournament

The TUBAD Mehmet Baturalp Tournament, also known simply as the TUBAD Tournament, is an annual invitational basketball competition played in the preseason between Turkish and international clubs in Istanbul, Turkey. It is organized by the Turkish Basketball Coaches Association (Türkiye Basketbol Antrenörleri Derneği; TUBAD) and is played in a tournament style format.

Fenerbahçe Beko basketball is the incumbent winner of the said tournament.

== History ==
The TUBAD tournament has been played every September in Istanbul, Turkey. The first season was inaugurated in 2014 in the same city. There was no tournament held in 2020.

== Performance by club ==
Club	Titles	Runners-up	Winning years
Fenerbahçe Basketball	3	0	2005, 2020, 2022
Banvit S.K.	1	0	2014
Anadolu Efes Pilsen	1	1	2018
