= Matthew Scott Krentz =

American actor

Matthew Krentz
- Born: Matthew Scott Krentz; August 5, 1976 (age 49); St. Louis, Missouri, U.S.
- Occupations: Director; Producer; Screenwriter; Actor
- Years active: 2002–present

Matthew Scott Krentz (born August 5, 1976), also known as Matt Krentz, is an American director, producer and actor.

Krentz was born in St. Louis, Missouri. He graduated from Kansas City's Rockhurst University also spending several summers volunteering at Robert Redford's Sundance Summer Filmmakers' Lab.

His debut film directing was the short 15-minute The Call in 2002. He continued to produce Ponteuse in 2004. But his biggest success has been Streetballers, a film that tells the story of a friendship between two junior college basketball players, one African-American, one Irish-American, both trying to use streetball as their escape. Krentz plays the lead role, John Hogan, the white player befriending a black player named Jacob Whitmore played by Jimmy McKinney. He shot the film entirely in St. Louis, Missouri with an entirely local cast and crew. Krentz is from Webster Groves, one of the city's inner-ring suburbs.

== Filmography ==
=== Director ===
- 2002: The Call
- 2009: Streetballers

=== Actor ===
- 2002: The Call as best friend
- 2009: Streetballers (2009) as John Hogan

=== Producer ===
- 2004: Ponteuse
- 2009: Streetballers

=== Writer ===
- 2009: Streetballers

=== Editor ===
- 2004: Ponteuse

== Awards ==
- Won Jury Award – Honorable Mention for Best Feature Film at the Hollywood Black Film Festival for his film Streetballers(2008)
- Won Audience Choice Award Best Feature Film at the St. Louis International Film Festival for his Streetballers(2008)
  - Also won Best Dramatic Feature prize at the same festival
