= Onur Aydın (basketball) =

Turkish basketball player (born 1979)

Onur Aydın (born March 15, 1979, in Istanbul) is a Turkish professional basketball player, currently playing for Başkent Gençlik

He studied at Anadolu University.
