= Dražen Bubnić =

Croatian-Slovenian basketball player

Personal information
- Born: 13 January 1986 (age 40) Rijeka, SFR Yugoslavia
- Listed height: 2.05 m (6 ft 9 in)
- Listed weight: 103 kg (227 lb)

Career information
- NBA draft: 2008: undrafted
- Playing career: 2004–present
- Position: Power forward

Career history
- 2004–2007: Hermes Analitica
- 2007: Geoplin Slovan
- 2007–2008: Elektra Šoštanj
- 2008–2009: KK Koper
- 2009–2010: Zlatorog Laško
- 2010–2012: Helios Domžale
- 2012–2014: Union Olimpija
- 2014–2015: CSU Sibiu
- 2015: Rogaška
- 2015: Šenčur GGD
- 2015–2016: Donar Groningen
- 2016–2019: Union / Petrol Olimpija
- 2019–2022: Šenčur GGD
- 2022–2024: Leone Ajdovščina

Career highlights
- Slovenian Supercup winner (2017); Dutch League champion (2016); 2x Slovenian League champion (2017, 2018); 2× Slovenian Cup winner (2013, 2017)

Dražen Bubnič (born 13 January 1986) is a Croatian-Slovenian professional basketball player who plays for KK Ajdovščina. He is a 2.05 m (6 ft 9 in) tall forward.

== Professional career ==
On 30 July 2012 Bubnič signed a one-year deal with Union Olimpija.

On 24 November 2015 Bubnič signed for the remainder of the 2015–16 season with Donar Groningen, where he replaced Garrick Sherman. With Donar, Bubnič won the DBL championship.

On 23 August 2016 Bubnič returned to Union Olimpija.
