= Ümit Türkoğlu =

Turkish basketball player

Free agent
- Position: Center

Personal information
- Born: October 22, 1981 (age 43); İzmir, Turkey
- Listed height: 6 ft 11 in (2.11 m)

Career information
- NBA draft: 2003: undrafted

Career history
- 2004–2007: Banvit
- 2007–2008: Mersin BB
- 2008–2009: Antalya BB
- 2009–2010: Erdemirspor
- 2010–2011: Türk Telekom
- 2011–2012: Maliye Milli Piyango
- 2012–2013: Yeşilgiresun Belediye
- 2013–2015: Eskişehir
- 2015–2016: Best Balıkesir

Ümit Türkoğlu (born October 22, 1981) is a Turkish professional basketball player who last played for Best Balıkesir of the TB2L. Standing at 2.10 m (6 ft 10 1/2 in) and he plays center position. He played 16 times for national team.

He started his career with Tofaş S.K. in junior level. He then played for Konyaspor B.K. and Kuşadasıspor in Turkish Basketball Second League in amateur section and started his professional career with Banvit B.K. in 2004.
