= Sergei Bykov =

Russian basketball player

Sergey Bykov
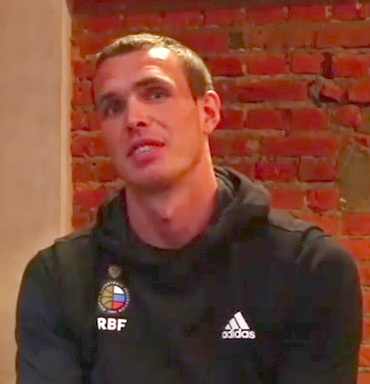
- Sergei Bykov in November 2017

Personal information
- Born: February 26, 1983 (age 43) Novodvinsk, Russian SFSR, Soviet Union
- Listed height: 1.90 m (6 ft 3 in)
- Listed weight: 210 lb (95 kg)

Career information
- NBA draft: 2005: undrafted
- Playing career: 2000–2017
- Position: Point guard / shooting guard
- Number: 10
- Coaching career: 2017–present

Career history

Playing
- 2000–2001: Spartak Moscow
- 2001–2004: Dynamo Moscow
- 2004–2005: Universitet Surgut
- 2005–2010: Dynamo Moscow
- 2010–2011: CSKA Moscow
- 2011–2014: Lokomotiv Kuban
- 2014–2015: UNICS Kazan
- 2015–2016: Lokomotiv Kuban
- 2016–2017: Avtodor Saratov

Coaching
- 2017–present: Russia (assistant)

Career highlights
- As a player: 2× EuroCup champion (2006, 2013); Russian League champion (2011)

Sergey Vladimirovich Bykov (alternate spelling: Sergei Bykov) (Russian: Сергей Владимирович Быков; born February 26, 1983) is a Russian former professional basketball player and basketball coach. Standing at 1.90 m (6 ft 3 in), he played at the point guard and shooting guard positions.

== Professional playing career ==
=== Club career ===
Bykov began playing with the junior youth clubs of Spartak Moscow. He made his professional debut with Spartak Moscow during the 2000–01 season. He moved to Dynamo Moscow before the 2001–02 season.

He then moved to Universitet Surgut before the 2004–05 season. He then returned to Dynamo Moscow before the 2005–06 season. In 2010, he joined CSKA Moscow, signing a three-year contract worth €4.5 million euros net income.

Only one year later, in June 2011 he signed with Lokomotiv Kuban. He parted ways with Lokomotiv on February 14, 2014. Five days layer, he signed with UNICS Kazan. On July 10, 2015, he parted ways with UNICS.

On July 13, 2015, he returned to Lokomotiv Kuban for the 2015–16 season.

On December 5, 2016, he signed with Avtodor Saratov for the rest of the season. Bykove retired from playing professional basketball after the 2016–17 season.

=== National team career ===
Bykov was also a member of the senior Russian national basketball team. With Russia's senior national team, he won the gold medal at EuroBasket 2007, and the bronze medal at EuroBasket 2011.

== Coaching career ==
After retiring from playing professional basketball in 2017, Bykov started working as a basketball coach. He became an assistant coach with the senior men's Russian national basketball team, in August 2017.
