= Jimmy McKinney =

American basketball player

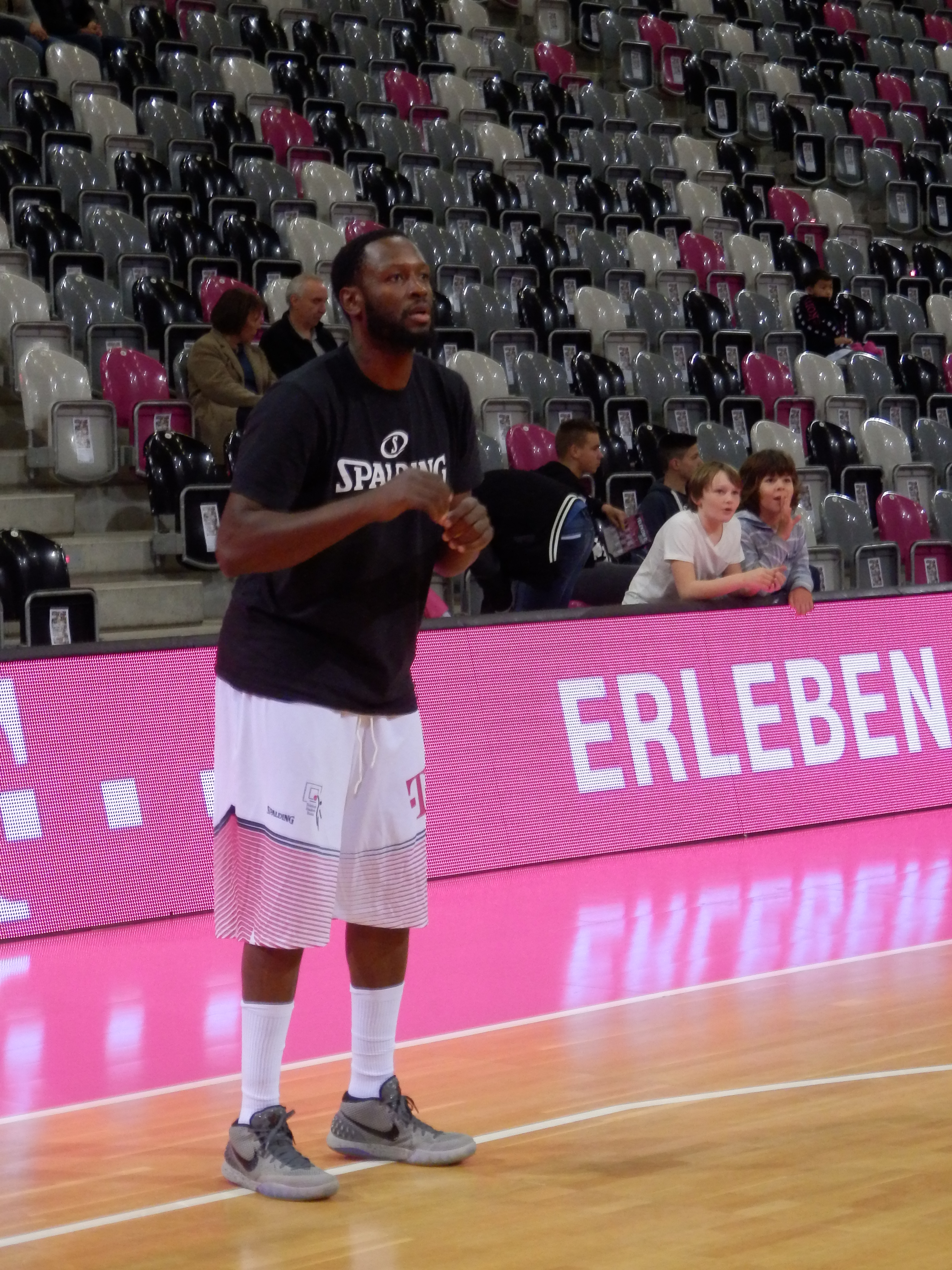
- McKinney for Telekom Baskets Bonn in 2015

Free agent
- Position: Shooting guard

Personal information
- Born: August 23, 1983 (age 42) St. Louis, Missouri, U.S.
- Listed height: 192 cm (6 ft 4 in)
- Listed weight: 93 kg (205 lb)

Career information
- High school: Vashon (St. Louis, Missouri)
- College: Missouri (2002–2006)
- NBA draft: 2006: undrafted
- Playing career: 2006–present

Career history
- 2006–2012: Deutsche Bank Skyliners
- 2012–2014: s.Oliver Baskets
- 2014–2015: Tigers Tübingen
- 2015–2016: Telekom Baskets Bonn

Career highlights
- German Bundesliga All-Star (2011); Fourth-team Parade All-American (2002); Mr. Show-Me Basketball (2002)

Jimmy McKinney (born August 23, 1983) is an American professional basketball player and film actor.

== Basketball career ==
McKinney attended Vashon High School in St. Louis, Missouri. He was the leading scorer on Vashon's 2001 and 2002 basketball teams, both of which won Missouri state championships. He later received a full scholarship to play college basketball at the University of Missouri. Since his graduation McKinney plays for the Frankfurt Skyliners. Since five seasons 2006 to 2011, he played for the Frankfurt Skyliners, a basketball team in the Germany-1 Bundesliga, reaching the German Bundesliga Semifinals in 2008 and the German Bundesliga Cup Semifinals in 2009. McKinney currently plays for s.Oliver Baskets in the Bundesliga. On December 8, 2014, he signed with Tigers Tübingen.

== Coaching career ==
McKinney was hired as the head coach of the boys basketball team at Kirkwood High School in St. Louis on July 24, 2020.

== Acting career ==
Most notably, McKinney also landed a lead role of Jacob Whitmore, a basketball player in the 2009 film Streetballers, the debut feature movie of director Matthew Scott Krentz.
