= Lance Williams (basketball) =

American basketball player

Personal information
- Born: June 19, 1980 (age 46) Chicago, Illinois
- Listed height: 6 ft 9 in (2.06 m)
- Listed weight: 249 lb (113 kg)

Career information
- High school: Julian (Chicago, Illinois)
- College: DePaul (1998–2002)
- NBA draft: 2002: undrafted
- Playing career: 2002–2016
- Position: Center

Career history
- 2002: St. Louis Sky Hawks
- 2002–2003: İstanbul Teknik Üniversitesi
- 2003: Westchester Wildfire
- 2003: Rockford Lightning
- 2004: Al-Ittihad
- 2004–2006: Bosna
- 2006: AEL Larissa
- 2007: Turów Zgorzelec
- 2007–2008: Bosna
- 2008–2012: Banvit
- 2012–2013: Türk Telekom
- 2013–2014: Igokea
- 2015: Club Atlético Goes
- 2015–2016: Kauhajoen Karhu

Career highlights
- 2× Bosnian League champion (2005, 2006); Bosnian Cup winner (2005); Saudi Premier League champion (2004)

Lance Williams (born June 19, 1980) is an American former professional basketball player.
