= Serkan Erdoğan =

Turkish basketball player (born 1978)

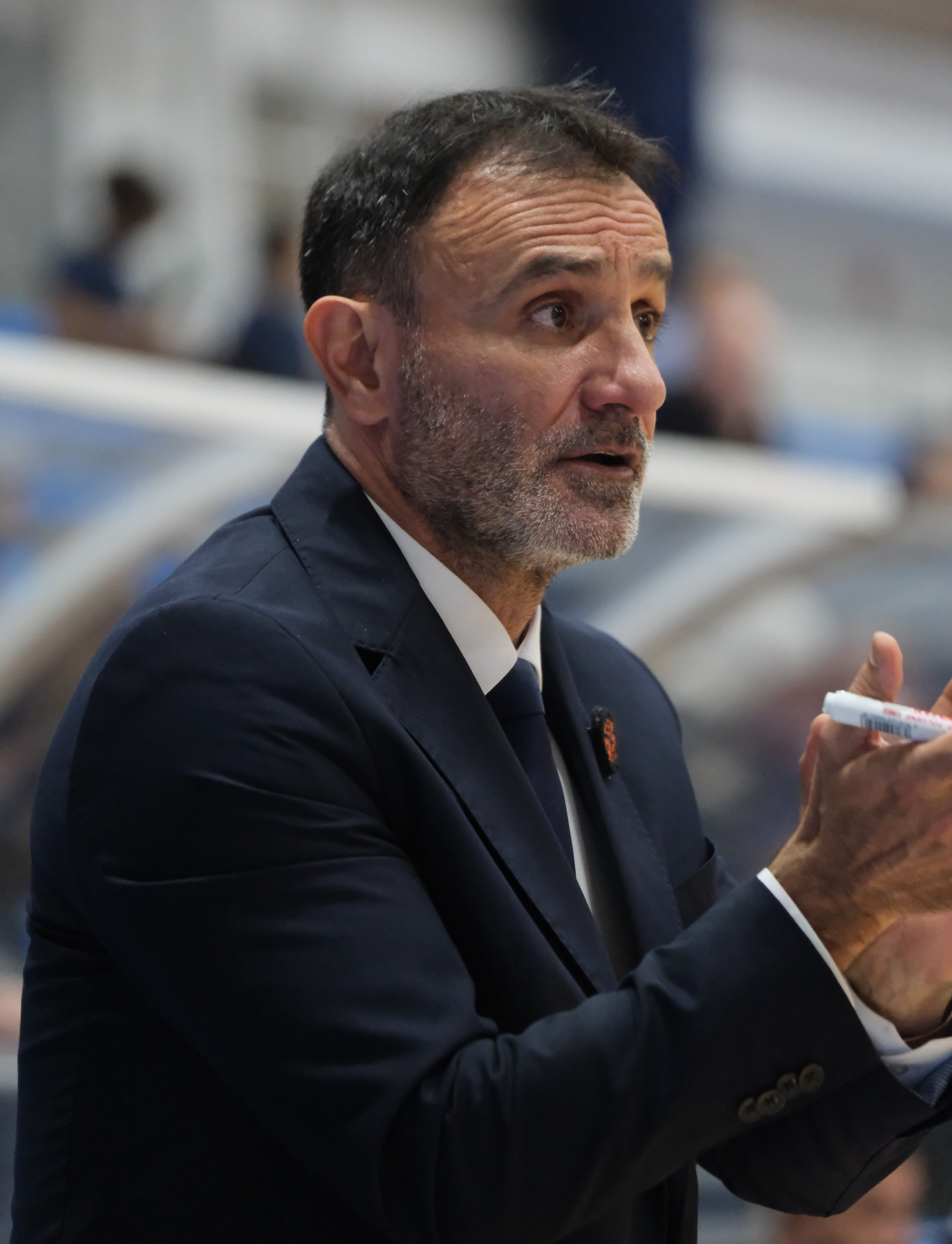
- Serkan Erdoğan in 2008

Personal information
- Born: August 30, 1978 (age 48) Amasya, Turkey
- Listed height: 6 ft 2.75 in (1.90 m)
- Listed weight: 185 lb (84 kg)

Career information
- Playing career: 1994–2013
- Position: Shooting guard
- Coaching career: 2014–present

Career history

Playing
- 1994–1995: Kolejliler
- 1995–1998: Tuborg Pilsener
- 1998–2000: Tofaş
- 2000–2005: Ülkerspor
- 2005–2007: TAU Cerámica
- 2007–2008: Efes Pilsen
- 2008–2010: Türk Telekom
- 2010–2011: Meridiano Alicante
- 2011: Beşiktaş
- 2011–2013: Banvit
- 2013: Royal Halı Gaziantep

Coaching
- 2014–2015: Pınar Karşıyaka (Youth team Assistant coach)
- 2015–2019: Tofaş (Personal Development Coach)
- 2019–2020: Bursaspor

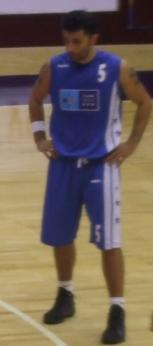
Serkan Erdoğan in 2008

Serkan Erdoğan (born 30 August 1978) is a Turkish retired professional basketball player. Erdoğan tested positive for the banned substance Nandrolone, and was thus immediately suspended from the FIBA SuproLeague's 2000–01 season competition.

== Professional career ==
Erdoğan was a developmental product of the TED Ankara Kolejliler academy, and made his professional debut with that team. He then played with the Turkish Super League clubs Tuborg Pilsener, Tofaş, and Ülkerspor. After that, Erdoğan played with TAU Ceramica of the Spanish League.

Erdoğan then played with the Turkish clubs Efes Pilsen and Türk Telekom. After that he moved to the Spanish club Meridiano Alicante. On January 24, 2011, he signed a contract with the Turkish club Beşiktaş. He signed a two-year contract with the Turkish club Banvit, in the summer of 2011. He signed a contract with the Turkish club Royal Halı Gaziantep, in the summer of 2013. With Gaziantep, he played his last game in professional club basketball in December 2013.

=== FIBA SuproLeague ban ===
Erdoğan tested positive for the banned substance Nandrolone, and he was thus immediately suspended from the FIBA SuproLeague's 2000–01 season competition. Erdoğan tested positive in his "A" urine sample, which revealed a level of Nandrolone (anabolic androgenic steroids) that was above the limit specified under FIBA's doping controls. The positive test result, which was tested by the body that is responsible for FIBA's drug testing, came after Ulker's home game against Panathinaikos Athens, on 7 December 2000.

== National team career ==
Erdoğan was also a member of the senior Turkish national team.
