= Barış Ermiş =

Turkish basketball player (born 1985)

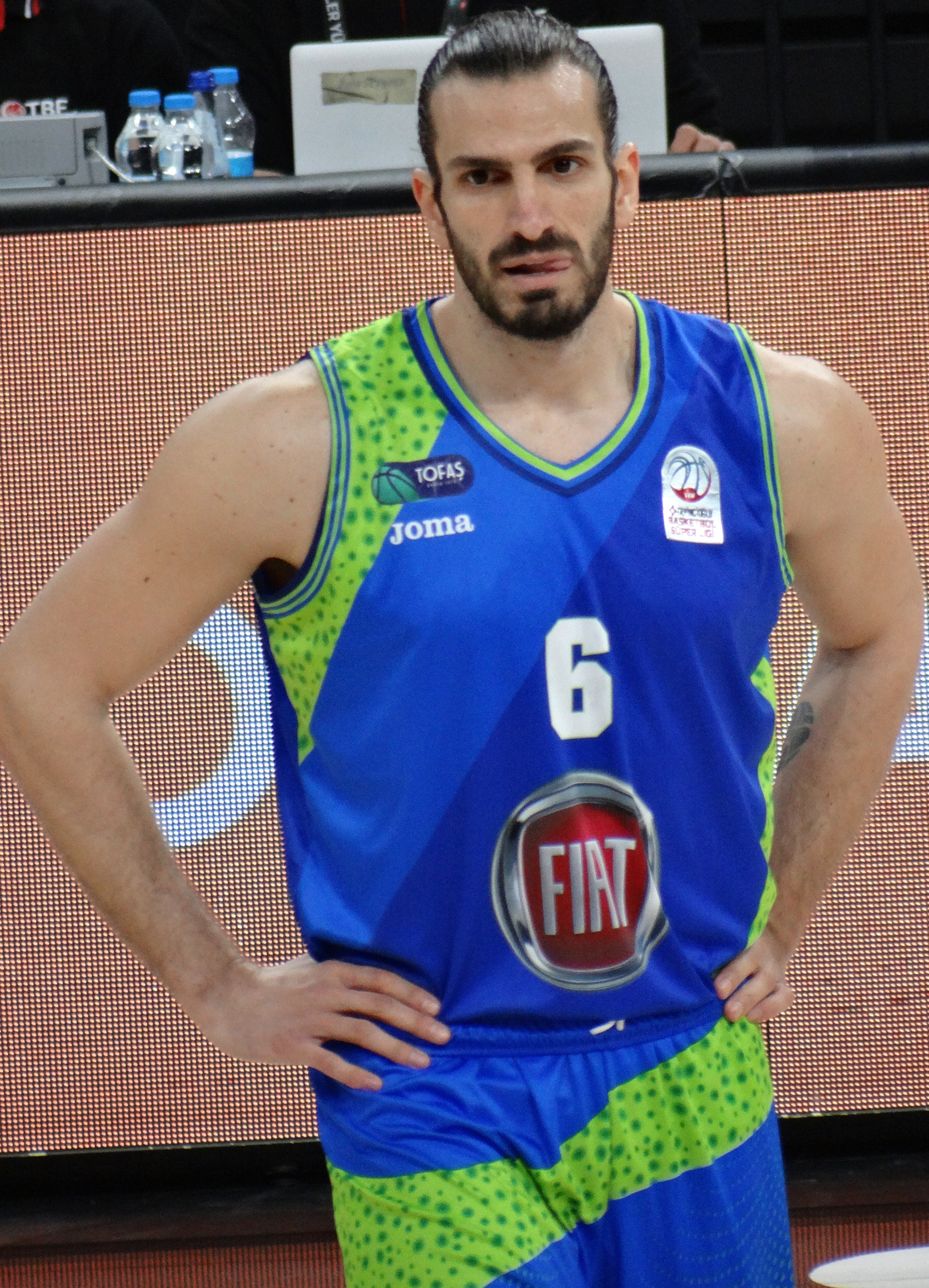
- Ermiş with Tofaş in 2018

Personal information
- Born: January 3, 1985 (age 41) Istanbul, Turkey
- Listed height: 1.93 m (6 ft 4 in)
- Listed weight: 92 kg (203 lb)

Career information
- Playing career: 2003–2021
- Position: Point guard
- Number: 6, 9

Career history
- 2003–2004: →Beşiktaş
- 2004–2007: Efes Pilsen
- 2007: →Türk Telekom
- 2007–2008: Pınar Karşıyaka
- 2008–2009: Türk Telekom
- 2009–2012: Banvit
- 2012–2014: Fenerbahçe
- 2014: →Royal Halı Gaziantep
- 2014–2015: Türk Telekom
- 2015–2020: Tofaş
- 2020–2021: Galatasaray

Career highlights
- BSL All-Star (2017)
Medals
Men's basketball
Representing Turkey
FIBA World Championship
Silver medal – second place	2010 Turkey	Team
Mediterranean Games
Gold medal – first place	2013 Mersin	Team

Barış Ermiş (born January 3, 1985) is a Turkish former professional basketball player. Internationally he represented the Turkish national team.

== Professional career ==
On August 13, 2008, Ermiş signed with Türk Telekom. After just one season with Türk Telekom, he transferred to Banvit B.K., where he played three seasons between 2009–2012. He then transferred to Fenerbahçe for the 2012–13 season.

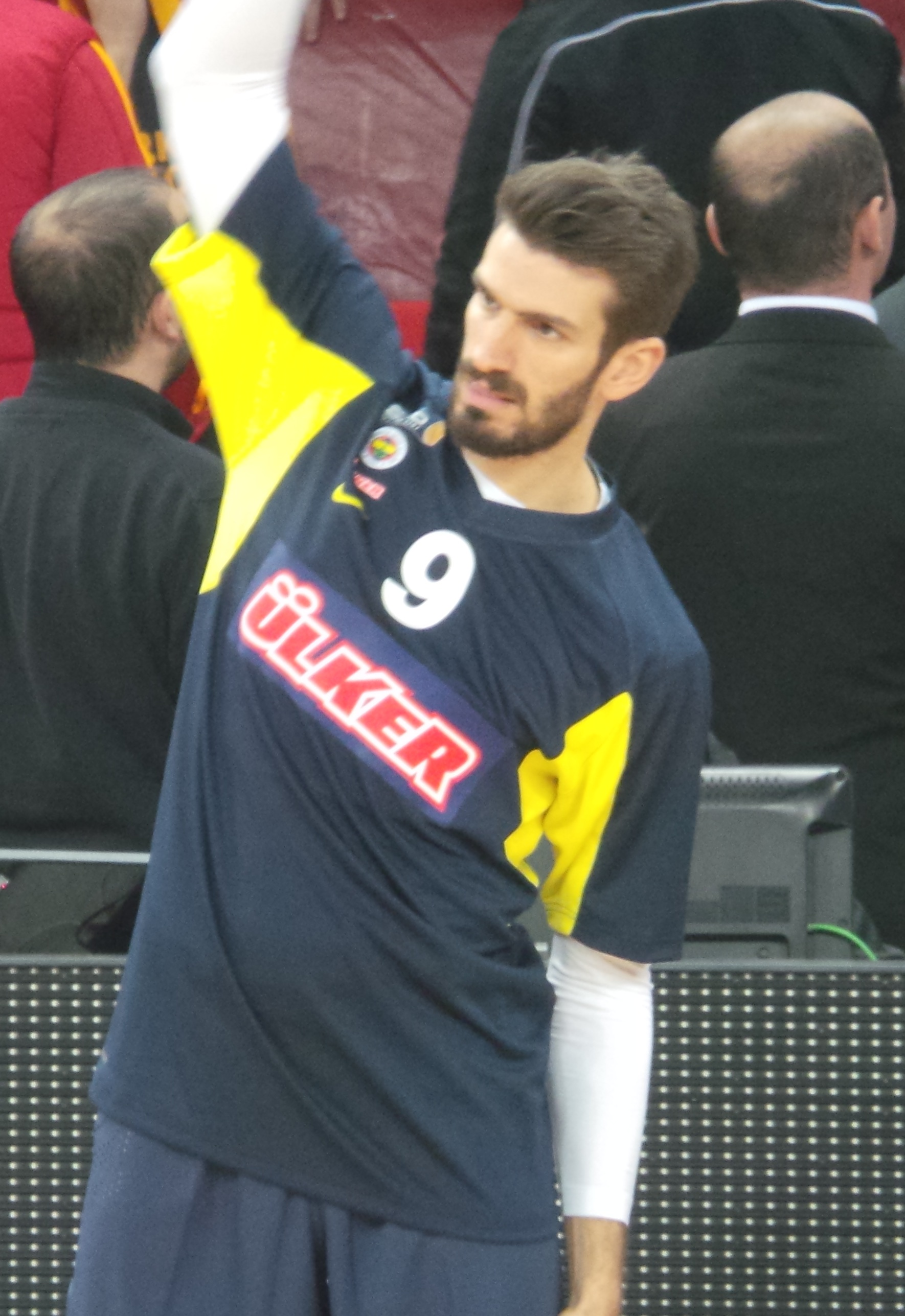
Ermiş with Fenerbahçe in 2013

Ermiş transferred to Türk Telekom again for the 2014–15 season, and then on July 2, 2015 he moved to Tofaş, where he had five successful seasons between 2015 and 2020.

On July 3, 2020, he signed with Galatasaray of the Turkish Basketbol Süper Ligi (BSL). On August 27, 2021, Ermiş announced his retirement from professional basketball.

== Turkish national team ==
He was a member of the Turkish men's national U-16 (played in 2001), U-18 (2002) and U-20 teams (in 2005) at European Championships. Barış Ermiş won the silver medal at the 2010 FIBA World Championship with the national team. Ermiş played in the national team, which became champion at the 2013 Mediterranean Games.

== Awards ==
=== National ===
- 2010 FIBA World Championship - Silver
- 2013 Mediterranean Games - Gold
