= Strahinja Milošević =

Serbian basketball player

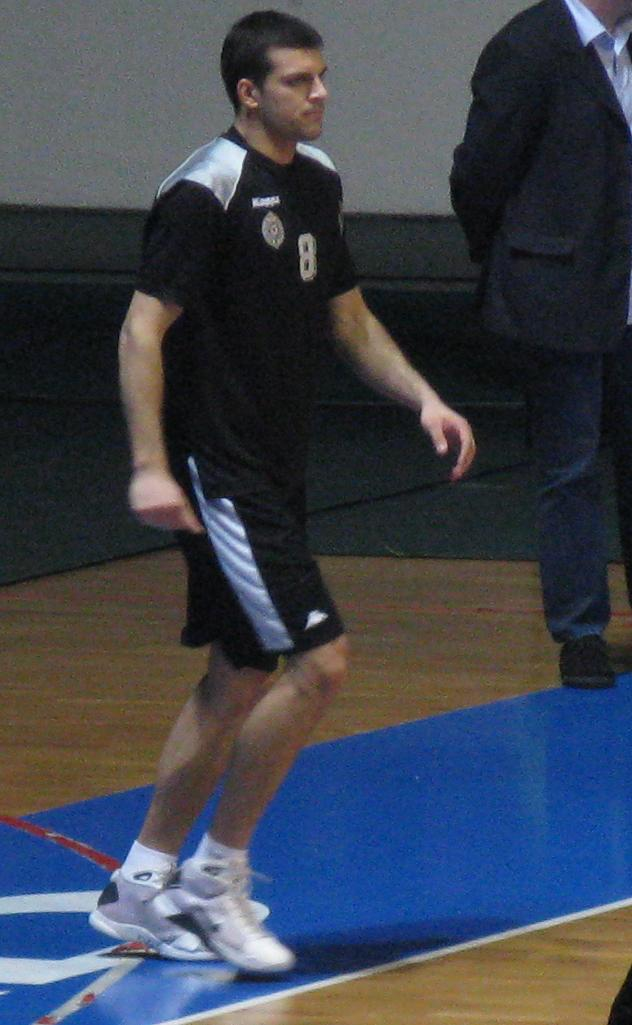
- Milošević warming up with Partizan in 2009

No. 12 – Falco
- Position: Small forward
- League: Hungarian League

Personal information
- Born: September 25, 1985 (age 41) Novi Sad, SR Serbia, SFR Yugoslavia
- Listed height: 2.03 m (6 ft 8 in)
- Listed weight: 104 kg (229 lb)

Career information
- NBA draft: 2007: undrafted
- Playing career: 2002–present

Career history
- 2002–2007: Vojvodina Srbijagas
- 2007–2010: Partizan
- 2010–2011: Crvena zvezda
- 2011–2012: Vojvodina Srbijagas
- 2012–2013: Budućnost Podgorica
- 2013: Karpoš Sokoli
- 2013–2016: Szolnoki Olaj
- 2016–2017: Real Betis Energía Plus
- 2017–2019: Szolnoki Olaj
- 2020: Debreceni EAC
- 2020–present: Falco KC

Career highlights
- 3× Adriatic League (2008–2010); 3× Serbian League (2008–2010); 3× Serbian Cup (2008–2010); 3× Hungarian League (2014–2016,2017); 4× Hungarian Cup (2014, 2015,2017,2018)
Medals
Representing Serbia
Universiade
Gold medal – first place	2009 Belgrade	Team
Silver medal – second place	2007 Bangkok	Team
Representing Serbia and Montenegro
Universiade
Bronze medal – third place	2005 Izmir	Team

Strahinja Milošević (Serbian Cyrillic: Страхиња Милошевић; born September 25, 1985) is a Serbian professional basketball player for Falco KC of the Hungarian Basketball League.

While playing for Partizan, from 2007 to 2010, Milošević won three consecutive Adriatic League, Basketball League of Serbia and Radivoj Korać Cup titles. He also won three medals at the Summer Universiade.

== Career statistics ==
Legend
GP	Games played	GS	Games started	MPG	Minutes per game
FG%	Field-goal percentage	3P%	3-point field-goal percentage	FT%	Free-throw percentage
RPG	Rebounds per game	APG	Assists per game	SPG	Steals per game
BPG	Blocks per game	PPG	Points per game	PIR	Performance index rating
**Bold**	Career high

=== EuroLeague ===
*	Led the league

Year	Team	GP	GS	MPG	FG%	3P%	FT%	RPG	APG	SPG	BPG	PPG	PIR
2007–08	Partizan	16	0	2.4	.286	.000	.000	.5	.1	—	—	0.3	-0.1
2008–09	Partizan	17	**1**	**7.5**	**.500**	**.500**	.500	**1.2**	**.4**	.1	**.1**	**1.8**	**1.2**
2009–10	Partizan	**22***	0	6.6	.483	.000	**.692**	**1.2**	.2	**.4**	**.1**	1.7	**1.2**
Career		55	1	5.7	.466	.200	.556	1.0	.2	.2	.1	1.3	0.8
