= Čedomir Vitkovac =

Serbian basketball player

Personal information
- Born: 28 October 1982 (age 44) Kruševac, SFR Yugoslavia
- Listed height: 2.01 m (6 ft 7 in)
- Listed weight: 102 kg (225 lb)

Career information
- NBA draft: 2004: undrafted
- Playing career: 1999–2017
- Position: Small forward / Power forward
- Number: 13

Career history
- 1999–2003: Napredak
- 2003–2006: Crvena zvezda
- 2006–2007: Vojvodina Srbijagas
- 2007–2009: Partizan
- 2009–2010: Budućnost Podgorica
- 2010–2011: Igokea
- 2011–2015: Budućnost Podgorica
- 2015–2016: Partizan
- 2016: Napredak
- 2016: Apollon Patras
- 2017: Napredak
- 2017: Mornar Bar

Career highlights
- 5× Montenegrin League champion (2010, 2012–2015); 4× Montenegrin Cup winner (2010, 2012, 2014, 2015); 2× Adriatic League champion (2008, 2009); 2× Serbian League champion (2008, 2009); 4× Serbian Cup winner (2004, 2006, 2008, 2009)

Čedomir Vitkovac (Serbian Cyrillic: Чедомир Витковац, born 28 October 1982) is a Serbian former professional basketball player. Vitkovac holds the record of total games played in the Adriatic League.

== Career ==
Vitkovac began his professional career with KK Napredak Kruševac in 1999. In the summer of 2003, he moved to KK Crvena zvezda where he played for three seasons. In October 2006, he moved to KK Vojvodina Srbijagas where he was a leading player that season. He moved to KK Partizan before the 2007–08 season. After playing two seasons in the Euroleague, Vitkovac moved to KK Budućnost Podgorica.

On 4 August 2010 Vitkovac signed a one-year contract with KK Igokea. In August 2011, he returned to Budućnost Podgorica. After four years in Podgorica, on 16 September 2015, Vitkovac returned to KK Partizan and signed a one–year contract.

The 2016–17 season Vitkovac started with Napredak, but after only one game he left the club and signed a short-term deal with the Greek League club Apollon Patras. He left Apollon after appearing in four games, and on 5 January 2017 he returned to Napredak. On 19 January 2017 he left again Napredak and signed with Montenegrin club Mornar Bar for the rest of the 2016–17 season.
