= Aleksa Popović =

Montenegrin basketball player

KK Bosna Royal
- Position: Small forward / shooting guard
- League: Basketball Championship of Bosnia and Herzegovina

Personal information
- Born: July 31, 1987 (age 39) Titograd, SR Montenegro, SFR Yugoslavia
- Listed height: 2.01 m (6 ft 7 in)
- Listed weight: 95 kg (209 lb)

Career information
- NBA draft: 2009: undrafted
- Playing career: 2004–present

Career history
- 2004–2007: Danilovgrad
- 2007–2010: Lovćen 1947
- 2010–2015: Budućnost
- 2015–2016: Sutjeska
- 2016: Metalac
- 2016–2017: Szolnoki Olaj
- 2017–2019: Lovćen 1947
- 2019–2020: Studentski centar
- 2020–2021: Lovćen 1947
- 2021–present: KK Bosna Royal

Career highlights
- 5× Montenegrin League (2011–2015); 4× Montenegrin Cup (2011, 2012, 2014, 2015)
Medals
Men's basketball
Representing Montenegro
Games of the Small States of Europe
Gold medal – first place	2015 Reykjavík	National Team

Aleksa Popović (Serbian Cyrillic: Алекса Поповић, born 31 July 1987) is a Montenegrin professional basketball player for KK Bosna Royal of the Basketball Championship of Bosnia and Herzegovina.

Popović spent the 2020–21 season with Lovćen 1947 of the Montenegrin Basketball League. He averaged 8.7 points, 1.8 rebounds, and 1.3 assists per game. On September 7, 2021, Popović signed with KK Bosna Royal of the Bosnian league.
