= Kenan Bajramović =

Bosnian basketball player

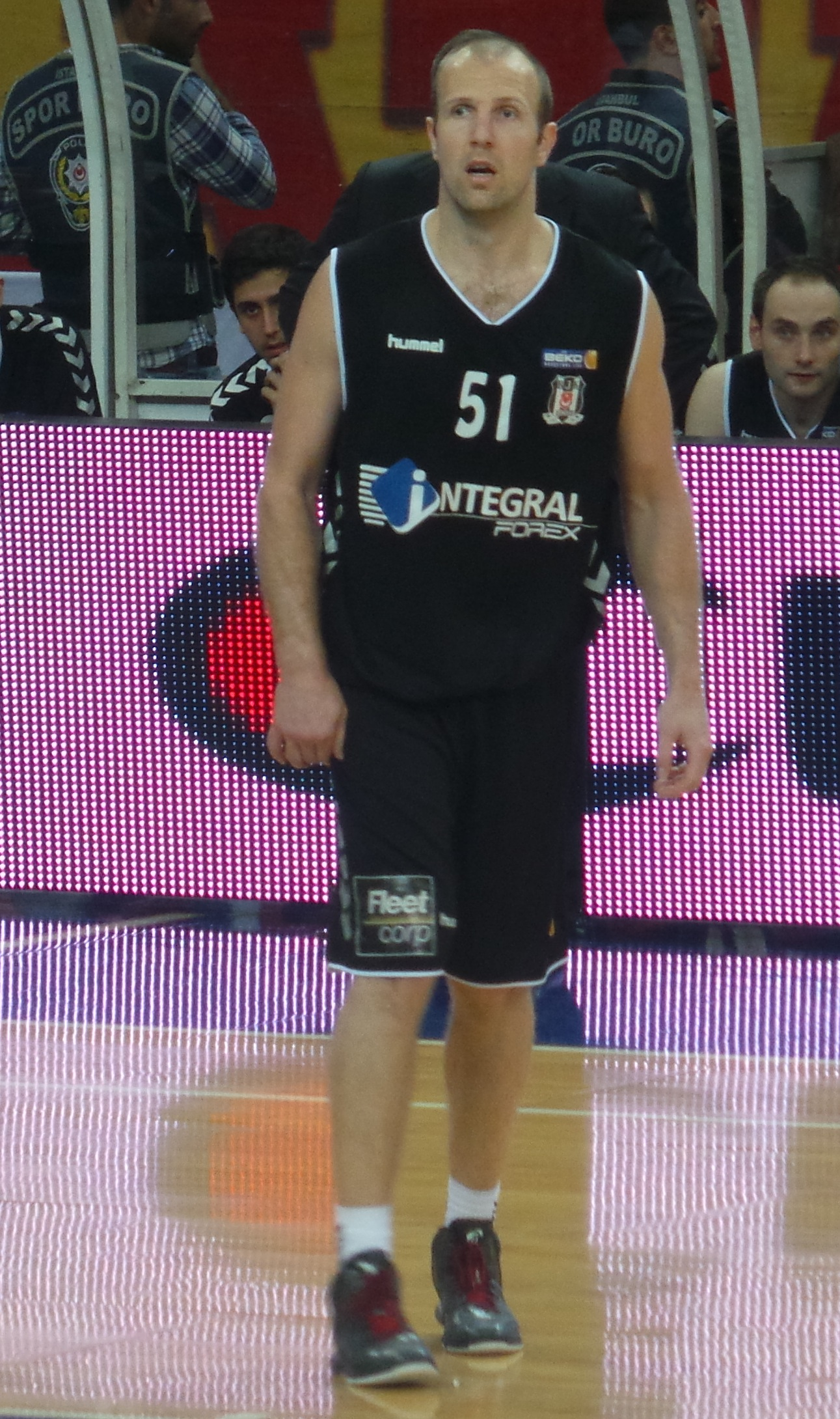
- Bajramović with Beşiktaş in 2014

Personal information
- Born: May 24, 1981 (age 45) Zenica, SR Bosnia and Herzegovina; SFR Yugoslavia
- Listed height: 2.06 m (6 ft 9 in)
- Listed weight: 104 kg (229 lb)

Career information
- NBA draft: 2003: undrafted
- Playing career: 1997–2019
- Position: Power forward
- Number: 51

Career history
- 1997–2003: Čelik Zenica
- 2003–2005: Bosna
- 2005–2007: Azovmash Mariupol
- 2007–2008: Lietuvos rytas
- 2008–2009: Kyiv
- 2009: Türk Telekom
- 2009: ALBA Berlin
- 2010–2011: Lietuvos rytas
- 2011–2013: Banvit
- 2013–2014: VEF Rīga
- 2014: Spars Sarajevo
- 2014–2015: Beşiktaş İntegral Forex
- 2015–2016: Spars Sarajevo
- 2016: Socar Petkim
- 2016: Cholet Basket
- 2016–2017: Spars Sarajevo
- 2017: Socar Petkim
- 2017–2018: Akhisar Belediyespor
- 2019: Spars Sarajevo

Career highlights
- LKL champion (2010); LFK Cup champion (2010); Bosnian League champion (2005); Bosnian Cup champion (2005); 2× Ukrainian League champion (2006, 2007); Ukrainian Cup champion (2006); 3× LKL All-Star Game (2008, 2010, 2011)

Kenan Bajramović (born May 24, 1981) is a Bosnian former professional basketball player.

== Professional career ==
Bajramović spent the early part of his career in his native Bosnia and Herzegovina between his original club, Čelik Zenica and Bosna Sarajevo, with whom he won the national title and cup in 2005.

From 2005 to 2007 he played with the Ukrainian team Azovmash Mariupol. With them he was a two-time champion of the Ukrainian SuperLeague. For the 2007–08 season he moved to Lietuvos rytas.

In June 2008, he signed a two-year deal with the Ukrainian team BC Kyiv. In February 2009, Kyiv released him. Later that month he signed with Türk Telekom of Turkey for the remainder of the season.

In August 2009, he signed a one-year deal with the German team ALBA Berlin. In December 2009, Alba released him. In January 2010, he signed with his former team Lietuvos rytas for the remainder of the season. With them he won the Lithuanian League in the 2009–10 season. He later re-signed with Rytas for one more season.

In August 2011, he signed a one-year deal with the Turkish team Banvit. In August 2012, he re-signed with Banvit for one more season.

In October 2013, he signed with the Latvian team VEF Rīga. In January 2014, he parted ways with Rīga. On January 22, 2014, he returned to Bosnia and signed with OKK Spars Sarajevo. However he played only one game with Spars, and on February 1, 2014, he signed with Beşiktaş İntegral Forex of Turkey for the rest of the season. On October 25, 2014, he extended his contract with Beşiktaş until the end of season.

On September 3, 2015, he signed with OKK Spars Sarajevo. On February 19, 2016, he left Spars and signed for the rest of the season with Socar Petkim of the Turkish Basketball First League. On August 12, 2016, Bajramović signed with French club Cholet Basket for the 2016–17 season. On November 8, 2016, he left Cholet and signed with OKK Spars Sarajevo. In November 2017, Bajramović signed with Turkish club Akhisar Belediyespor.

In January 2019, Bajramović signed for Spars Sarajevo for the rest of the 2018–19 season. It was his fourth stint with the Spars.

== Euroleague career statistics ==
Legend
GP	Games played	GS	Games started	MPG	Minutes per game
FG%	Field-goal percentage	3P%	3-point field-goal percentage	FT%	Free-throw percentage
RPG	Rebounds per game	APG	Assists per game	SPG	Steals per game
BPG	Blocks per game	PPG	Points per game	PIR	Performance index rating
**Bold**	Career high

Year	Team	GP	GS	MPG	FG%	3P%	FT%	RPG	APG	SPG	BPG	PPG	PIR
2007–08	Lietuvos rytas	**19**	**6**	24.5	**.500**	**.421**	.759	**5.7**	.8	**.6**	**.4**	11.1	**11.4**
2010–11	Lietuvos rytas	14	**6**	**26.1**	.465	.233	**.766**	5.2	**1.4**	**.6**	.2	**11.4**	10.4

== Bosnian national team ==
Bajramović is a long time member of the Bosnia and Herzegovina national basketball team. He played with them at the three European Championships (2003, 2005 and 2011).
