= Bandırma B.İ.K. =

Turkish Basketball League team based in Bandırma, Balıkesir, Turkey

Teksüt Bandırma
- Founded: 1994
- Dissolved: 2020
- History: Banvit B.K. (1994–2019); Bandırma B.I.K. (2019–2020)
- Arena: Kara Ali Acar Sport Hall
- Capacity: 3,000
- Location: Bandırma, Turkey
- Team colors: Dark Green, Light Green, white
- Affiliation: Bandırma Kırmızı
- Championships: 1 Turkish Cup
- Website: bandirmabk.com
| Home | Away |

Bandırma Basketbol İhtisas Kulübü (English: Bandırma Basketball Specialization Club), for sponsorship reasons Teksüt Bandırma, was a Turkish professional basketball team from Bandırma, Turkey. Their home arena is the Kara Ali Acar Sport Hall.

Founded in 1994 as Banvit B.K., the team played in the highest level Basketbol Süper Ligi since 2004. The team reached the Süper Ligi finals in 2013 and won the Turkish Cup in 2017. Banvit was also a regular in European competitions, with their best result being Basketball Champions League runners-up in 2017.

The team was dissolved in 2021 due to financial issues.

== History ==
The Banvit basketball club was founded in 1994, by workers at Banvit, a meat company based in Bandirma. The team began playing in the Turkish regional leagues in 1998, and were promoted to the Turkish second division in 2001. In 2004, the team was promoted to the Turkish top-tier level BSL, as champions of the second division.

The team played in the European-wide fourth-tier level FIBA EuroCup Challenge, in their first BSL season, and reached the league's semifinal. The team has reached the semifinal of the BSL five times, and reached the final of the Turkish Cup twice. In the 2012–13 season, the team beat Beşiktaş, in the quarterfinal series, and beat Anadolu Efes in the semifinal series of the BSL playoffs, and reached the league's finals, where they lost against Galatasaray Medical Park 4–1. In the next season, Banvit qualified for the Qualifying Round of the EuroLeague 2013–14 season. But they lost in the qualification round against Telenet Oostende, and were dropped down to the second-tier level EuroCup.

Original logo of the club

In the 2016–17 season, Banvit played in the inaugural season of the Basketball Champions League. In the competition, it reached the championship game of the Final Four in Tenerife, Banvit's first European final. Banvit lost 63–59 to host team Iberostar Tenerife.

On 1 June 2019, Banvit B.B. changed its club name to Bandırma B.İ.K. On 19 July, a sponsorship agreement was announced which would name the team Teksüt Bandırma for the 2019–20 season. However, on August 21, 2020, Teksüt Bandırma announced that they withdrew from Basketbol Süper Ligi due to financial issues.

== Honours ==
=== Domestic competitions ===
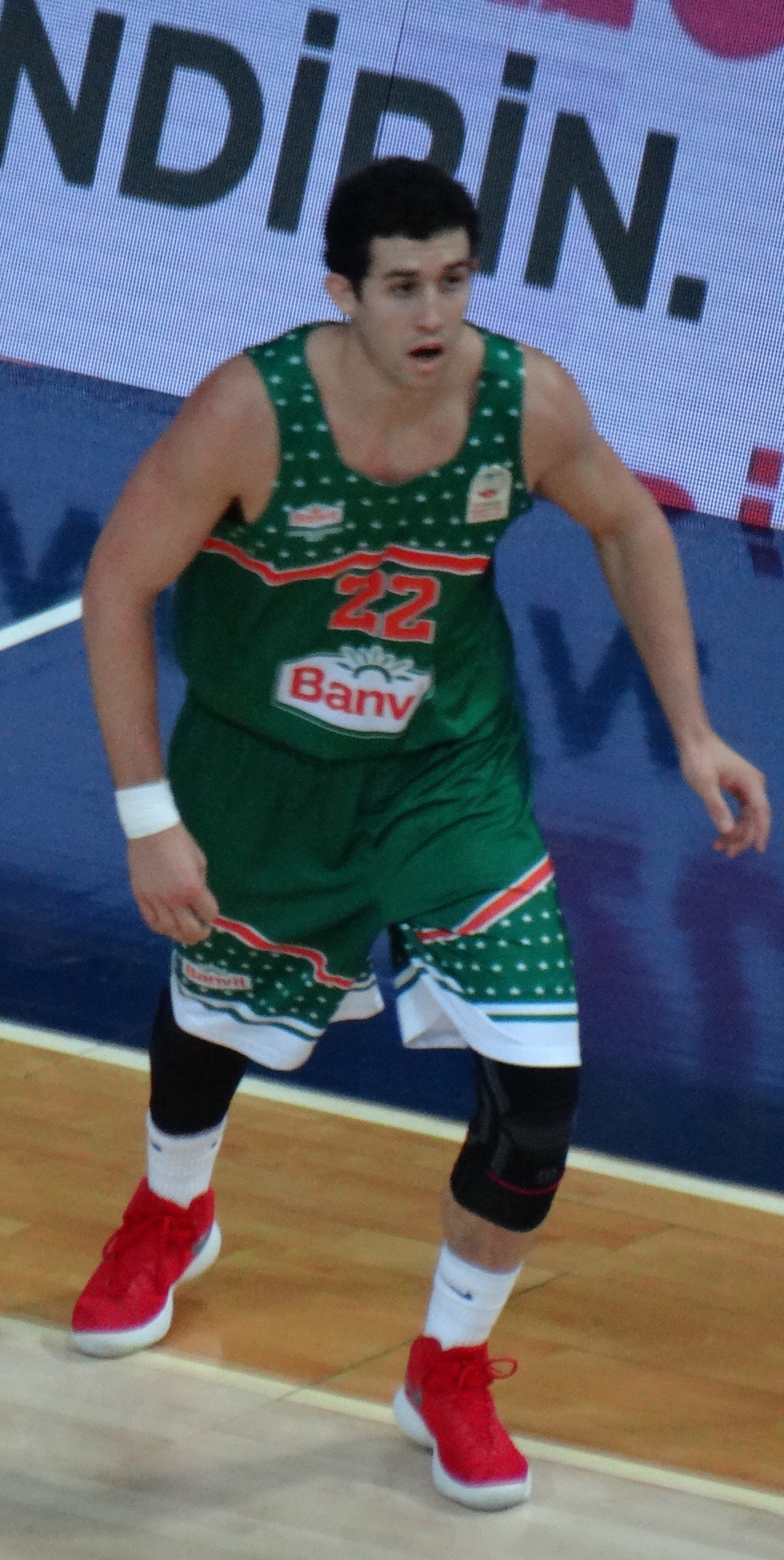
Angelo Caloiaro

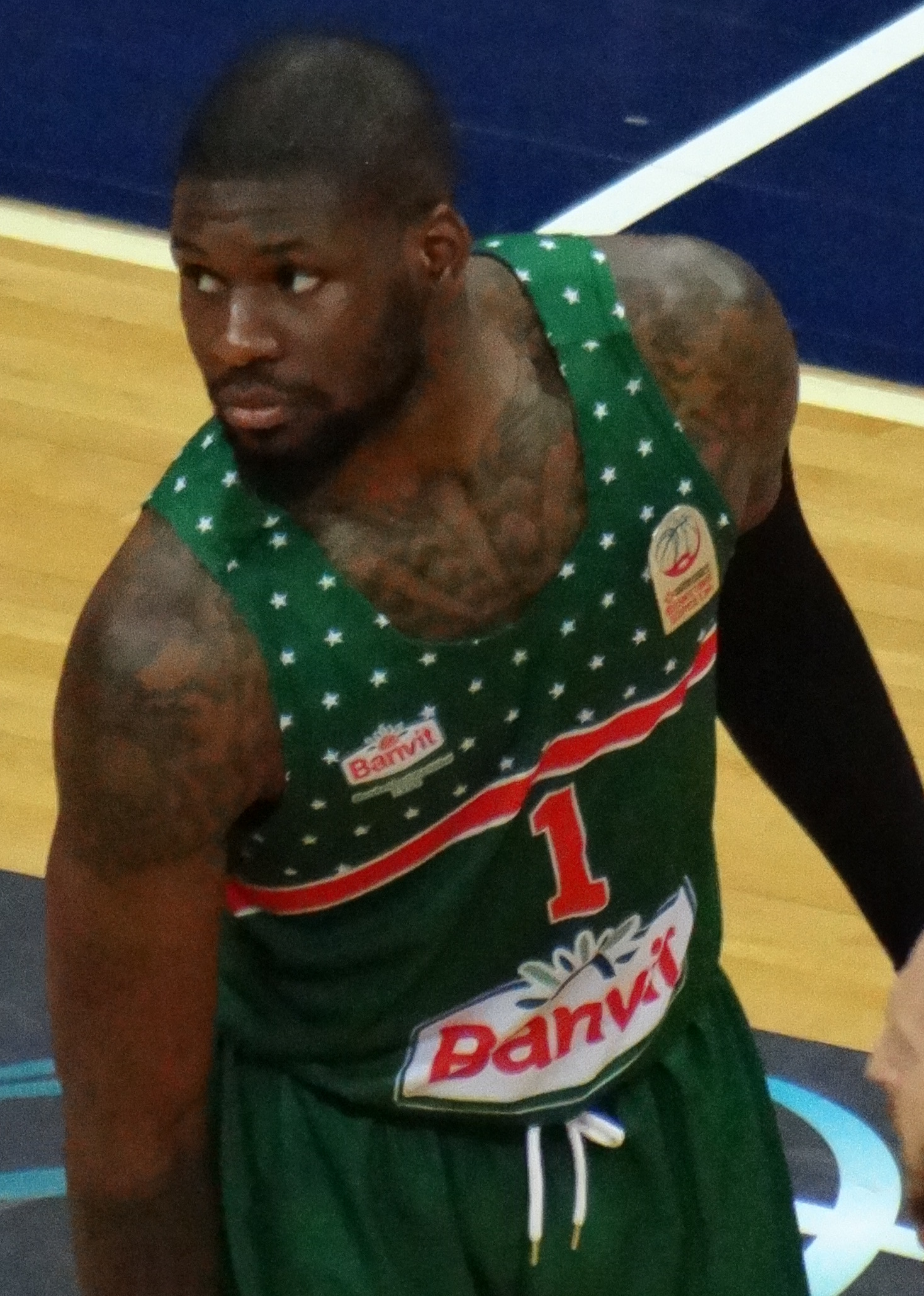
Adonis Thomas

- Turkish Super League
  - Runners-up (1): 2012–13
- Turkish Cup
  - Winners (1): 2017
  - Runners-up (2): 2007, 2012
- Turkish Super Cup
  - Runners-up (1): 2017

=== European competitions ===
- Basketball Champions League
  - Runners-up (1): 2016–17

=== Other competitions ===
- TUBAD Basketball Tournament
  - Winners (1): 2014

== Season by season ==
| Season | Tier | League | Pos. | Turkish Cup | European competitions | |
|---|---|---|---|---|---|---|
| 2009–10 | 1 | TBL | 3rd | Quarterfinalist | 3 EuroChallenge | T16 |
| 2010–11 | 1 | TBL | 3rd | Quarterfinalist | 1 Euroleague | QR1 |
| 2010–11 | 1 | TBL | 3rd | Quarterfinalist | 2 Eurocup | RS |
| 2011–12 | 1 | TBL | 4th | Runner-up | 1 Euroleague | QR1 |
| 2011–12 | 1 | TBL | 4th | Runner-up | 2 Eurocup | T16 |
| 2012–13 | 1 | TBL | 2nd | Semifinalist | 2 Eurocup | T16 |
| 2013–14 | 1 | TBL | 3rd | Group stage | 1 Euroleague | QR2 |
| 2013–14 | 1 | TBL | 3rd | Group stage | 2 Eurocup | R32 |
| 2014–15 | 1 | TBL | 6th | Quarterfinalist | 2 Eurocup | SF |
| 2015–16 | 1 | Süper Ligi | 5th | Semifinalist | 2 Eurocup | EF |
| 2016–17 | 1 | Süper Ligi | 5th | Champions | 3 Champions League | RU |
| 2017–18 | 1 | Süper Ligi | 4th | | 3 Champions League | QF |
| 2018–19 | 1 | Süper Ligi | 8th | | 3 Champions League | R16 |
| 2019–20 | 1 | Süper Ligi | 7th | | 3 Champions League | R16 |

== Players ==
=== FIBA Hall of Famers ===
Bandırma B.İ.K. FIBA Hall of Famers
Players
| No. | Nat. | Name | Position | Tenure | Inducted |
|---|---|---|---|---|---|
| 12 | (New Zealand) | Pero Cameron | PF | 2005–2006 | 2017 |

=== Notable players ===
Note: Flags indicate national team eligibility at FIBA-sanctioned events. Players may hold other non-FIBA nationalities not displayed.

Criteria

To appear in this section a player must have either:

- Set a club record or won an individual award while at the club
- Played at least one official international match for their national team at any time
- Played at least one official NBA match at any time.

- (Turkey) Alperen Şengün
- (Turkey) Barış Ermiş
- (Turkey) Bekir Yarangüme
- (Turkey) Can Akın
- (Turkey) Caner Topaloğlu
- (Turkey) Onur Aydın
- (Turkey) Serkan Erdoğan
- (Turkey) Ümit Sonkol
- (Turkey) Ümit Türkoğlu
- (Turkey) Yunus Çankaya
- (Turkey) - (Albania) Ermal Kuqo
- (Turkey) - (Albania) Erxhan Osmani
- (Turkey) Erkan Veyseloğlu
- (Turkey) Cevher Özer
- (Turkey) Şafak Edge
- (Turkey) Furkan Korkmaz
- (France) Adrien Moerman
- (Slovenia) Klemen Prepelič
- (Slovenia) Smiljan Pavič
- (Slovenia) Gašper Vidmar
- (Central African Republic) Michael Mokongo
- (Belarus) Vladimir Veremeenko
- (Dominican Republic) Sammy Mejia
- (New Zealand) Paul Henare
- (Montenegro) Vladimir Golubović
- (Montenegro) Vladimir Dragičević
- (Nigeria) Kenny Adeleke
- (Serbia) Miroslav Radošević
- (Serbia) Vladimir Štimac
- (Serbia) Stefan Marković
- (Bosnia and Herzegovina) Kenan Bajramović
- (United States) George Banks
- (United States) Keith Simmons
- (United States) Corsley Edwards
- (United States) Antonio Graves
- (United States) Donnell Harvey
- (United States) Arthur Long
- (United States) Paul Miller
- (United States) Marque Perry
- (United States) Juan Dixon
- (United States) Lance Williams
- (United States) Kalin Lucas
- (United States) Cliff Hammonds
- (United States) - (Azerbaijan) Chuck Davis
- (United States) E.J. Rowland
- (United States) Courtney Fortson
- (United States) - (Poland) A. J. Slaughter
- (United States) Dominique Johnson
- (United States) Emanuel Terry
- (United States) Adonis Thomas
