= Charles Davis (basketball, born 1984) =

American-born Azerbaijani basketball player

Personal information
- Born: April 18, 1984 (age 42) Selma, Alabama, U.S.
- Listed height: 6 ft 8.5 in (2.04 m)
- Listed weight: 225 lb (102 kg)

Career information
- High school: Southside (Selma, Alabama)
- College: Alabama (2002–2006)
- NBA draft: 2006: undrafted
- Playing career: 2006–2016
- Position: Power forward

Career history
- 2006–2007: CASA TED Kolejliler
- 2007–2008: BC Oostende
- 2008–2009: Aliağa Petkim
- 2009–2015: Bandırma Banvit
- 2016: Galatasaray

Career highlights
- Eurocup champion (2016); Belgian Cup winner (2008); Second-team All-SEC (2005)

Charles Edward "Chuck" Davis, Jr. (Azerbaijani; born April 18, 1984, in Çarlz Eduard "Çak" Deyvis, Jr) is an American-born naturalized Azerbaijani former professional basketball player. He is 204 cm (6 ft 8.5 in) tall, and played both forward positions.

Davis was also a member of the Azerbaijan national basketball team.

== The Basketball Tournament (TBT) (2017–present) ==
In the summer of 2017, Davis played in The Basketball Tournament on ESPN for team Trained To Go. He competed for the $2 million prize, and for team Trained To Go, he shot 67 percent in field goals in one game. Davis and team Trained To Go lost in the first round of the tournament to the Broad Street Brawlers 108–95.
