= Kara Ali Acar Sport Hall =

Indoor sports arena in Bandırma, Turkey

Banvit Kara Ali Acar Sport Hall Banvit Kara Ali Acar Spor Salonu
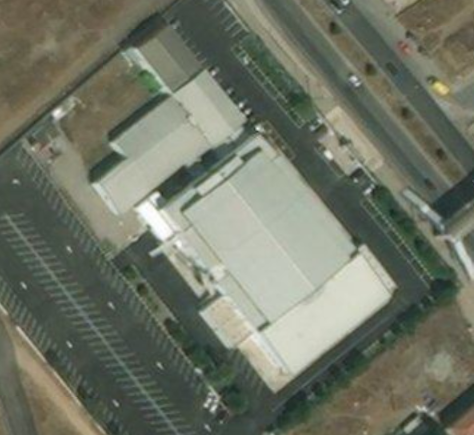
- Interactive map of Banvit Kara Ali Acar Sport Hall; Banvit Kara Ali Acar Spor Salonu
- Location: Bandırma, Balıkesir Province, Turkey
- Coordinates: 40.33860°N 27.98688°E
- Capacity: Basketball: 3,000

Construction
- Opened: 2001

Tenants
- Bandırma Basketbol (TBL); Bandırma Kırmızı (TB2L)

Banvit Kara Ali Acar Sport Hall is an indoor arena located in the Bandırma town of Balıkesir Province, Turkey. The arena mostly hosts basketball games and is the home arena of the Bandırma Basketbol İhtisas and Bandırma Kırmızı basketball teams. It has a seating capacity for 3,000 spectators.

== History ==
Kara Ali Acar Sport Hall opened in the year 2001.
