= Keith Simmons (basketball) =

American basketball player

Personal information
- Born: February 24, 1985 (age 41) Kingston, New York, U.S.
- Listed height: 6 ft 5 in (1.96 m)
- Listed weight: 201 lb (91 kg)

Career information
- High school: Kingston (Kingston, New York)
- College: Holy Cross (2003–2007)
- NBA draft: 2007: undrafted
- Playing career: 2007–2016
- Position: Shooting guard / small forward

Career history
- 2007–2008: Kepez Belediyespor
- 2008–2009: Deutsche Bank Skyliners
- 2009–2016: Banvit

Career highlights
- Patriot League Player of the Year (2007); 3× First-team All-Patriot League (2005–2007); Patriot League tournament MVP (2007)

Keith Matthew Simmons (born February 24, 1985) is an American former professional basketball player. He also holds Turkish citizenship.

== College ==
Simmons played for the Holy Cross Crusaders men's basketball team and won the 2007 Patriot League men's basketball tournament. Simmons was awarded Most Valuable Player of the final.

== Professional career ==
In the summer of 2007, he signed a contract with Kepez Belediyespor of the Turkish Basketball League. In the summer of 2008, he signed with Deutsche Bank Skyliners of the Basketball Bundesliga. In the summer of 2009, he signed a contract with Banvit of the Turkish Basketball League.
