= 2010–11 Fenerbahçe S.K. (basketball) season =

Fenerbahçe Ülker
2010–11 season
- Chairman: Aziz Yıldırım
- Head coach: Neven Spahija
- Arena: Sinan Erdem Dome
- Turkish Basketball League: 1st seed
- Playoffs: Winners
- Euroleague: Top 16
- Turkish Cup: Winners
- Presidential Cup: Runners-up

The 2010–11 season was Fenerbahçe's 97th season in the existence of the club. The team played in the Turkish Basketball League and in the Euroleague.

== Players ==
=== Squad information ===
Fenerbahçe Ülker roster
Players
Coaches

Pos.	No.	Nat.	Name	Ht.	Wt.	Age
SG	4	(Croatia)	Ukić, Roko	1.96 m (6 ft 5 in)	86 kg (190 lb)	26 – 5 December 1984
G	5	(Turkey)	Eroğlu, Erbil	1.94 m (6 ft 4 in)	85 kg (187 lb)	18 – 23 January 1993
PF	6	(Turkey) (Serbia)	Türkcan, Mirsad	2.06 m (6 ft 9 in)	113 kg (249 lb)	34 – 7 June 1976
SG	7	(Turkey)	Onan, Ömer (C)	1.94 m (6 ft 4 in)	95 kg (209 lb)	33 – 4 February 1978
G	10	(Turkey)	Atsür, Engin	1.93 m (6 ft 4 in)	86 kg (190 lb)	27 – 2 April 1984
C	11	(Slovenia)	Vidmar, Gašper	2.10 m (6 ft 11 in)	120 kg (265 lb)	23 – 14 September 1987
F/C	12	(Lithuania)	Lavrinovič, Darjuš	2.12 m (6 ft 11 in)	110 kg (243 lb)	31 – 1 November 1979
SG	13	(Lithuania)	Jasikevičius, Šarūnas	1.94 m (6 ft 4 in)	92 kg (203 lb)	35 – 5 March 1976
PF	14	(Turkey)	Peker, Kaya	2.08 m (6 ft 10 in)	111 kg (245 lb)	30 – 2 August 1980
G	16	(Turkey) (Russia)	Mutaf, Can Maxim	1.91 m (6 ft 3 in)	95 kg (209 lb)	20 – 9 January 1991
C	21	(Turkey)	Savaş, Oğuz	2.11 m (6 ft 11 in)	132 kg (291 lb)	23 – 13 July 1987
G/F	22	(United States)	Kinsey, Tarence	1.98 m (6 ft 6 in)	84 kg (185 lb)	27 – 21 March 1984
SF	33	(Croatia)	Tomas, Marko	2.01 m (6 ft 7 in)	98 kg (216 lb)	26 – 3 January 1985
PF	42	(United States)	May, Sean	2.06 m (6 ft 9 in)	121 kg (267 lb)	27 – 4 April 1984
F	55	(Turkey) (Bosnia and Herzegovina)	Preldžić, Emir	2.06 m (6 ft 9 in)	100 kg (220 lb)	23 – 6 September 1987

Head coach

- (Croatia) Neven Spahija

Team manager

- (Bosnia and Herzegovina) Damir Mršić

Legend

- (C) Team captain
- Injured

- Roster

=== Depth chart ===
Pos.	Starting 5	Bench 1	Bench 2	Bench 3
C	Darjuš Lavrinovič	Oğuz Savaş	Gašper Vidmar
PF	Mirsad Türkcan	Kaya Peker	Sean May
SF	Marko Tomas	Emir Preldžić
SG	Ömer Onan	Tarence Kinsey	Can Maxim Mutaf
PG	Roko Ukić	Šarūnas Jasikevičius	Engin Atsür	Erbil Eroğlu

=== Transactions ===
==== In ====
No.	Pos.	Nat.	Name	Age	Moving from		Ends	Date	Source
10	PG	(Turkey)	Engin Atsür	26	Beşiktaş Cola Turka	(Turkey)	June 2012	17 June 2010	
33	G/F	(Croatia)	Marko Tomas	25	KK Cibona	(Croatia)	June 2012	23 June 2010	
14	C	(Turkey)	Kaya Peker	28	Efes Pilsen	(Turkey)	June 2012	24 June 2010	
12	C	(Lithuania)	Darjuš Lavrinovič	30	Real Madrid	(Spain)	June 2011	3 July 2010	
42	PF	(United States)	Sean May	26	Sacramento Kings	(United States)	June 2011	2 December 2010	
13	PG	(Lithuania)	Šarūnas Jasikevičius	34	Lietuvos rytas	(Lithuania)	June 2011	3 January 2011	

==== Out ====
No.	Pos.	Nat.	Name	Age	Moving to		Date	Source
12	SG	(Bosnia and Herzegovina)	Damir Mršić	39	Retired		1 July 2010	
33	SG	(Turkey)	Serhat Çetin	24	Beşiktaş Cola Turka	(Turkey)	21 June 2010	
8	PF	(Turkey)	Rasim Başak	30	Türk Telekom	(Turkey)	22 June 2010	
24	C	(Turkey)	Ömer Aşık	24	Chicago Bulls	(United States)	13 July 2010	
17	C	(Austria)	Rašid Mahalbašić	20	Tofaş	(Turkey)	December 2010	
10	SG	(Croatia)	Gordan Giriček	33	KK Cibona	(Croatia)	24 December 2010	
14	PG	(United States)	Lynn Greer	31	Olimpia Milano	(Italy)	11 January 2011	

== Overview ==
Competition	First match	Last match	Starting round	Final position	Record							
Competition	First match	Last match	Starting round	Final position	Pld	W	D	L	PF	PA	PD	Win %
Turkish Basketball League	17 October 2010	17 June 2011	Round 1	Winners	40	35	0	5	3,475	2,960	+515	87.50
Euroleague	20 October 2010	3 March 2011	Round 1	Top 16	16	10	0	6	1,251	1,185	+66	62.50
Turkish Cup	9 October 2010	13 February 2011	Group stage	Winners	6	6	0	0	471	387	+84	100.00
Presidential Cup	13 October 2010		Final	Runnersup	1	0	0	1	79	77	+2	0.00
Total					63	51	0	12	5,276	4,609	+667	80.95

Source: Competitions

=== Presidential Cup ===
13 October 2010

Report

Fenerbahçe Ülker	77–79	Efes Pilsen
Scoring by quarter: 28–15, 19–21, 15–24, 15–19
Pts: Savaş 18		Pts: Tunçeri 18

Abdi İpekçi Arena, Istanbul

=== Turkish Basketball League ===
==== League table ====
Pos	Team	Pld	W	L	PF	PA	PD	Pts	Qualification or relegation
1	Fenerbahçe Ülker	30	27	3	2523	2188	+335	57	Qualification to playoffs
2	Banvit	30	23	7	2383	2161	+222	53	Qualification to playoffs
3	Galatasaray Cafe Crown	30	22	8	2381	2078	+303	52	Qualification to playoffs
4	Efes Pilsen	30	22	8	2493	2106	+387	52	Qualification to playoffs
5	Pınar Karşıyaka	30	21	9	2555	2357	+198	51	Qualification to playoffs
6	Beşiktaş Cola Turka	30	19	11	2515	2380	+135	49	Qualification to playoffs
7	Olin Edirne	30	17	13	2225	2155	+70	47	Qualification to playoffs
8	Antalya BB	30	14	16	2308	2391	−83	44	Qualification to playoffs
9	Tofaş	30	13	17	2190	2247	−57	43	
10	Türk Telekom	30	12	18	2326	2425	−99	42	
11	Medical Park Trabzonspor	30	10	20	2315	2506	−191	40	
12	Erdemirspor	30	10	20	2293	2382	−89	40	
13	Mersin BB	30	10	20	2243	2326	−83	40	
14	Aliağa Petkim	30	9	21	2268	2615	−347	39	
15	Bornova Belediye (R)	30	8	22	2198	2461	−263	38	Relegation to TBL
16	Oyak Renault (R)	30	3	27	2065	2503	−438	33	Relegation to TBL

Source: TBL
(R) Relegated

==== Results summary ====
Overall						Home					Away				
Pld	W	L	PF	PA	PD	W	L	PF	PA	PD	W	L	PF	PA	PD
30	27	3	2523	2188	+335	14	1	1290	1079	+211	13	2	1233	1109	+124

Source: TBF.org.tr

==== Results by round ====
Round	1	2	3	4	5	6	7	8	9	10	11	12	13	14	15	16	17	18	19	20	21	22	23	24	25	26	27	28	29	30
Ground	A	H	A	H	H	A	H	A	H	A	H	A	H	A	H	H	A	H	A	A	H	A	H	A	H	A	H	A	H	A
Result	W	W	W	W	W	W	W	W	W	L	W	L	W	W	W	W	W	W	W	W	L	W	W	W	W	W	W	W	W	W
Position	1	1	1	1	1	1	1	1	1	1	1	2	2	1	1	1	1	1	1	1	1	1	1	1	1	1	1	1	1	1

Source: TBF.org.tr
A = Away; H = Home; W = Win; L = Loss

==== Matches ====
Date	City	Opponent	Score	Top scorer
17 October 2010	Bandırma	Banvit	70–67	Lavrinovič (24)
23 October 2010	Istanbul	Aliağa Petkim	96–73	Tomas (16)
31 October 2010	İzmir	Bornova Belediye	97–68	Onan (27)
6 November 2010	Istanbul	Oyak Renault	95–62	Türkcan (20)
13 November 2010	Istanbul	Medical Park Trabzonspor	77–55	Preldžić (17)
21 November 2010	Istanbul	Beşiktaş Cola Turka	74–67	Onan (20)
27 November 2010	Istanbul	Olin Edirne	75–63	Peker, Preldžić and Türkcan (12)
4 December 2010	Antalya	Antalya BB	89–77	Onan (21)
11 December 2010	Istanbul	Erdemirspor	90–83 (OT)	Onan (18)
19 December 2010	İzmir	Pınar Karşıyaka	98–101 (OT)	Onan (29)
25 December 2010	Istanbul	Tofaş	83–61	Mutaf (12)
29 December 2010	Istanbul	Galatasaray Cafe Crown	56–67	Onan (16)
3 January 2011	Istanbul	Efes Pilsen	81–72	Tomas (22)
8 January 2011	Mersin	Mersin BB	86–74	Onan (20)
14 January 2011	Istanbul	Türk Telekom	83–68	Savaş (26)
23 January 2011	Istanbul	Banvit	83–70	Onan (14)
30 January 2011	İzmir	Aliağa Petkim	94–71	Onan (16)
19 February 2011	Istanbul	Bornova Belediye	97–72	Preldžić (19)
26 February 2011	Bursa	Oyak Renault	73–68	Preldžić (25)
6 March 2011	Trabzon	Medical Park Trabzonspor	86–74	Peker and Ukić (15)
12 March 2011	Istanbul	Beşiktaş Cola Turka	84–92	Onan (15)
20 March 2011	Edirne	Olin Edirne	83–78	Lavrinovič (27)
25 March 2011	Istanbul	Antalya BB	97–83	Preldžić (28)
2 April 2011	Kdz. Ereğli	Erdemirspor	82–74	Ukić (17)
9 April 2011	Istanbul	Pınar Karşıyaka	82–66	Savaş and Ukić (16)
15 April 2011	Bursa	Tofaş	81–74	Ukić (24)
20 April 2011	Istanbul	Galatasaray Cafe Crown	83–80	Tomas and Ukić (17)
24 April 2011	Istanbul	Efes Pilsen	72–70 (OT)	Ukić (19)
29 April 2011	Istanbul	Mersin BB	83–79	Jasikevičius and Preldžić (16)
6 May 2011	Ankara	Türk Telekom	81–74	Lavrinovič and Savaş (15)

==== Play-offs ====
Date	City	Round	Opponent	Score	Top scorer
11 May 2011	Istanbul	Quarter-finals	Antalya BB	80–77	Tomas (20)
14 May 2011	Antalya	Quarter-finals	Antalya BB	90–79	Jasikevičius (19)
24 May 2011	Istanbul	Semi-finals	Efes Pilsen	79–70	Onan (15)
27 May 2011	Istanbul	Semi-finals	Efes Pilsen	87–82	Tomas (22)
4 June 2011	Istanbul	Finals	Galatasaray Cafe Crown	81–59	Onan (15)
6 June 2011	Istanbul	Finals	Galatasaray Cafe Crown	95–74	Lavrinovič and Tomas (18)
9 June 2011	Istanbul	Finals	Galatasaray Cafe Crown	93–97 (OT)	Onan and Ukić (18)
11 June 2011	Istanbul	Finals	Galatasaray Cafe Crown	85–74	Savaş (19)
14 June 2011	Istanbul	Finals	Galatasaray Cafe Crown	71–72	Preldžić (16)
17 June 2011	Istanbul	Finals	Galatasaray Cafe Crown	91–88	Onan (20)

=== Euroleague ===
==== Group C regular season ====
===== Standing =====
	Team	Pld	W	L	PF	PA	Diff	Tie-break
1.	(Italy) Montepaschi Siena	10	8	2	787	661	+126	
2.	(Turkey) Fenerbahçe Ülker	10	7	3	795	723	+72	1–1 +2
3.	(Spain) FC Barcelona	10	7	3	766	709	+57	1–1 −2
4.	(Lithuania) Lietuvos Rytas	10	4	6	779	784	−5	1–1 +8
5.	(France) Cholet	10	4	6	705	774	−69	1–1 −8
6.	(Croatia) Cibona	10	0	10	677	858	−181	

===== Fixtures/results =====
All times given below are in Central European Time.

20 October 2010
19:15

Report

Fenerbahçe Ülker (Turkey)	86–67	(Lithuania) Lietuvos Rytas
Scoring by quarter: 24–16, 16–11, 22–18, 24–24
Pts: Lavrinovič 21; Rebs: Peker 11; Asts: Ukić 7		Pts: Bjelica, Newley 15; Rebs: Valančiūnas 10; Asts: Milošević 5

Sinan Erdem Dome, Istanbul
Attendance: 8,424
Referees: Sasa Pukl (SLO), Spiros Gkontas (GRE), Zdravko Rutesić (MNE)

28 October 2010
18:30

Report

KK Cibona Zagreb (Croatia)	68–73	(Turkey) Fenerbahçe Ülker
Scoring by quarter: 19–19, 21–23, 11–16, 17–15
Pts: Radošević 16; Rebs: Zubčić 7 Asts: Stipčević 6		Pts: Kinsey 17; Rebs: Türkcan 9 Asts: Ukić 4

Dražen Petrović Basketball Hall, Zagreb
Attendance: 4,500
Referees: Jose Ramon Garcia Ortiz (ESP), Gianpaolo Cicoria (ITA), Sergiy Chebyshev (UKR)

4 November 2010
20:45

Report

Regal FC Barcelona (Spain)	61–69	(Turkey) Fenerbahçe Ülker
Scoring by quarter: 13−14, 15−18, 17−12, 16−25
Pts: Mickeal 17; Rebs: Vázquez 7 Asts: Three players 2		Pts: Ukić 13; Rebs: Three players 6 Asts: Greer 4

Palau Blaugrana, Barcelona
Attendance: 4,217
Referees: Ilija Belošević (SRB), Fernando Rocha (POR), Eddie Viator (FRA)

10 November 2010
19:15

Report

Fenerbahçe Ülker (Turkey)	81–68	(Italy) Montepaschi Siena
Scoring by quarter: 23–17, 17–17, 18–14, 23–20
Pts: Türkcan 13; Rebs: Türkcan 10; Asts: Onan 3		Pts: McCalebb 18; Rebs: Stonerook 7 Asts: Zisis, Moss 4

Sinan Erdem Dome, Istanbul
Attendance: 14,785
Referees: José Martín (ESP), Milivoje Jovcić (SRB), Robert Lottermoser (GER)

17 November 2010
20:30

Report

Cholet Basket (France)	82–78	(Turkey) Fenerbahçe Ülker
Scoring by quarter: 20-24, 21-10, 19-18, 22-26
Pts: Mejia 29; Rebs: Marquis 8 Asts: Avdalovic 5		Pts: Ukić, Kinsey 15; Rebs: Lavrinovič 8 Asts: Ukić 4

La Meilleraie, Cholet
Attendance: 4800
Referees: Grzegorz Ziemblicki (POL), Carmelo Paternico (ITA), Panagiotis Anastopoulos (GRE)

24 November 2010
18:45

Report

Lietuvos Rytas (Lithuania)	75–81	(Turkey) Fenerbahçe Ülker
Scoring by quarter: 13-18, 23-22, 14-25, 25-16
Pts: Gecevičius 16; Rebs: Nalga 8 Asts: Jasikevičius 8		Pts: Ukić 24; Rebs: Lavrinovič 6 Asts: Kinsey, Tomas 3

Siemens Arena, Vilnius
Attendance: 7200
Referees: Juan Carlos Mitjana (ESP), Sergey Mikhaylov (RUS), Oscar Perea (ESP)

1 December 2010
19:15

Report

Fenerbahçe Ülker (Turkey)	100–70	(Croatia) KK Cibona Zagreb
Scoring by quarter: 30 - 13, 19 - 16, 25 - 22, 26 - 19
Pts: Kinsey 20; Rebs: Türkcan 9 Asts: Ukić, Greer 4		Pts: Bogdanović 23; Rebs: Zubčić, Radošević 6 Asts: Stipčević 5

Sinan Erdem Dome, Istanbul
Attendance: 15,168
Referees: Juan Carlos Mitjana (ESP), Javor, Damir (SLO), Bissang, Joseph (FRA)

9 December 2010
19:15

Report

Fenerbahçe Ülker (Turkey)	69–75	(Spain) Regal FC Barcelona
Scoring by quarter: 14-21, 14-29, 23-16, 18-19
Pts: Ukić 13; Rebs: Türkcan 12; Asts: Ukić 5		Pts: N'Dong 14; Rebs: Vázquez 9 Asts: Rubio 10

Sinan Erdem Dome, Istanbul
Attendance: 15,752
Referees: Christos Christodoulou (GRE), Paola Taurino (ITA), Borys Ryzhyk (UKR)

16 December 2010
20:45

Report

Montepaschi Siena (Italy)	94–65	(Turkey) Fenerbahçe Ülker
Scoring by quarter: 27–14, 22–16, 23–19, 22–16
Pts: McCalebb 22; Rebs: K. Lavrinovič 11; Asts: McCalebb 7		Pts: D. Lavrinovič, Tomas 11; Rebs: Savaş 6 Asts: Kinsey 3

Palasport Mens Sana, Siena
Attendance: 4,713
Referees: Sasa Pukl (SLO), Zoran Sutulovic (MNE), Spiros Gkontas (GRE)

23 December 2010
20:45

Report

Fenerbahçe Ülker (Turkey)	93–61	(France) Cholet Basket
Scoring by quarter: 16–16, 22–14, 21–13, 34–18
Pts: Lavrinovič 18; Rebs: Türkcan 8 Asts: Preldžič 11		Pts: Mejia 17; Rebs: Vebobe 8 Asts: Avdalović 4

Sinan Erdem Dome, Istanbul
Attendance: 10,245
Referees: José Martín (ESP), Matej Boltauzer (SLO), Luis Lopes (POR)

==== Group H Top 16 ====
===== Standing =====
	Team	Pld	W	L	PF	PA	Diff	Tie-break
1.	(Greece) Olympiacos	6	5	1	461	418	+43	
2.	(Spain) Power Electronics Valencia	6	3	3	449	438	+11	1−1 +12
3.	(Turkey) Fenerbahçe Ülker	6	3	3	456	462	−6	1−1 −12
4.	(Lithuania) Žalgiris	6	1	5	418	466	−48	

===== Fixtures/results =====
All times given below are in Central European Time.

20 January 2011
20:45

Report

Olympiacos Piraeus (Greece)	70–84	(Turkey) Fenerbahçe Ülker
Scoring by quarter: 18–16, 15–17, 25–22, 12–29
Pts: Papaloukas 15; Rebs: three players 5 Asts: Spanoulis 4		Pts: Tomas 19; Rebs: Preldžič 7 Asts: Ukić 4

Peace and Friendship Stadium, Piraeus
Attendance: 8,000
Referees: Juan Carlos Mitjana (ESP), Jakub Zamojski (POL), Eddie Viator (FRA)

27 January 2011
20:45

Report

Fenerbahçe Ülker (Turkey)	75–73	(Spain) Power Electronics Valencia
Scoring by quarter: 21–20, 16–13, 17–19, 21–21
Pts: Onan 22; Rebs: Lavrinovič 9 Asts: Peker 5		Pts: Martínez 14; Rebs: Savanović, Javtokas 7 Asts: Cook 7

Sinan Erdem Dome, Istanbul
Attendance: 15,600
Referees: Guerrino Cerebuch (ITA), Ilija Belosevic (SRB), Sinisa Herceg (CRO)

2 February 2011
19:15

Report

Fenerbahçe Ülker (Turkey)	80–72	(Lithuania) Žalgiris Kaunas
Scoring by quarter: 22–19, 19–22, 17–13, 22–18
Pts: Tomas, Savaş 15; Rebs: Türkcan 14; Asts: Ukić 4		Pts: Jakūnas, Collins 14; Rebs: Jakūnas, Watson 6 Asts: Pocius 4

Sinan Erdem Dome, Istanbul
Attendance: 15,560
Referees: Luigi Lamonica (ITA), Dani Hierrezuelo (ESP), Milija Vojinovic (SRB)

16 February 2011
19:45

Report

Žalgiris Kaunas (Lithuania)	85–84 (OT)	(Turkey) Fenerbahçe Ülker
Scoring by quarter: 15–11, 15–20, 19–18, 20–20, Overtime: 16–15
Pts: Pocius, Delininkaitis 13; Rebs: Jankūnas 7 Asts: Jankūnas 4		Pts: Onan 23; Rebs: Savaş 6 Asts: Jasikevičius 4

Kaunas Sports Hall, Kaunas
Attendance: 5,000
Referees: Christos Christodoulou (GRE), Borys Ryzhyk (UKR), Matej Boltauzer (SLO)

24 February 2011
19:15

Report

Fenerbahçe Ülker (Turkey)	65–80	(Greece) Olympiacos Piraeus
Scoring by quarter: 18–20, 18–14, 19–20, 10–26
Pts: Ukić 14; Rebs: Kinsey 6 Asts: Ukić 4		Pts: Erceg 19; Rebs: Nesterović 9 Asts: Papaloukas 8

Sinan Erdem Dome, Istanbul
Attendance: 15,870
Referees: Juan Carlos Arteaga (ESP), Paolo Taurino (ITA), Antonio Conde (ESP)

3 March 2011
19:45

Report

Power Electronics Valencia (Spain)	82–68	(Turkey) Fenerbahçe Ülker
Scoring by quarter: 15–15, 24–17, 20–20, 23–16
Pts: de Colo, Javtokas 15; Rebs: Lishouk 8 Asts: Cook 11		Pts: Preldžič 20; Rebs: Tomas 8 Asts: Ukić 4

Pabellon Municipal Fuente San Luis, Valencia
Attendance: 9,000
Referees: Zoran Sutulovic (MNE), Guerrino Cerebuch (ITA), Fernando Rocha (POR)

=== Turkish Basketball Cup ===
==== Group C ====
===== Standing =====
Pos	Team	Pld	W	L	PF	PA	PD	Pts	Qualification
1	Fenerbahçe Ülker	3	3	0	244	177	+67	6	Advance to Final 8
2	Medical Park Trabzonspor	3	1	2	205	228	−23	4	Advance to Final 8
3	Tofaş	3	1	2	220	226	−6	4	
4	Bornova Belediyespor	3	1	2	202	240	−38	4	

Source: Turkish Basketball Federation

==== Final ====
February 13, 2011
15.00

Report

Beşiktaş Cola Turka	72–81	Fenerbahçe Ülker
Scoring by quarter: 19–20, 18–17, 14–21, 21–23
Pts: Ogilvy 24; Rebs: Ogilvy 14; Asts: Serkan 7		Pts: Preldžič 35; Rebs: Kaya 9 Asts: Preldžič 4

Kadir Has Spor Salonu, Kayseri
Referees: Engin Kennerman, Recep Ankaralı, Serkan Emlek
MVP: Emir Preldžič
