= 2011–12 Fenerbahçe S.K. (basketball) season =

Fenerbahçe Ülker
2011–12 season
- Chairman: Aziz Yıldırım
- Head coach: Neven Spahija
- Arena: Abdi İpekçi Arena
- Turkish Basketball League: 5th seed
- Playoffs: Quarterfinals
- Euroleague: Top 16
- Turkish Cup: Quarterfinals
- Presidential Cup: Runners-up

The 2011–12 season was Fenerbahçe's 98th season in the existence of the club. The team played in the Turkish Basketball League and in the Euroleague.

== Players ==
=== Squad information ===
Fenerbahçe Ülker roster
Players
Coaches

Pos.	No.	Nat.	Name	Ht.	Wt.	Age
SG	4	(Croatia)	Ukić, Roko	1.96 m (6 ft 5 in)	86 kg (190 lb)	27 – 5 December 1984
PG	5	(United States)	Finley, Morris	1.80 m (5 ft 11 in)	79 kg (174 lb)	30 – 2 August 1981
PF	6	(Turkey) (Serbia)	Türkcan, Mirsad	2.06 m (6 ft 9 in)	113 kg (249 lb)	35 – 7 June 1976
SG	7	(Turkey)	Onan, Ömer (C)	1.94 m (6 ft 4 in)	95 kg (209 lb)	34 – 4 February 1978
G	8	(Turkey)	Eroğlu, Erbil	1.94 m (6 ft 4 in)	85 kg (187 lb)	19 – 23 January 1993
G	10	(Turkey)	Atsür, Engin	1.93 m (6 ft 4 in)	86 kg (190 lb)	28 – 2 April 1984
C	13	(Slovenia)	Vidmar, Gašper	2.10 m (6 ft 11 in)	120 kg (265 lb)	24 – 14 September 1987
PF	14	(Turkey)	Peker, Kaya	2.08 m (6 ft 10 in)	111 kg (245 lb)	31 – 2 August 1980
PF	15	(United States)	Gist, James	2.06 m (6 ft 9 in)	107 kg (236 lb)	25 – 26 October 1986
C	21	(Turkey)	Savaş, Oğuz	2.11 m (6 ft 11 in)	132 kg (291 lb)	24 – 13 July 1987
G	23	(Turkey)	Demirel, Hakan	1.91 m (6 ft 3 in)	85 kg (187 lb)	26 – 7 May 1986
SF	32	(Turkey)	Candan, Berkay	2.06 m (6 ft 9 in)	101 kg (223 lb)	18 – 22 May 1993
SF	33	(Croatia)	Tomas, Marko	2.01 m (6 ft 7 in)	98 kg (216 lb)	27 – 3 January 1985
F	44	(Croatia)	Bogdanović, Bojan	2.01 m (6 ft 7 in)	103 kg (227 lb)	23 – 18 April 1989
F	55	(Turkey) (Bosnia and Herzegovina)	Preldžič, Emir	2.06 m (6 ft 9 in)	100 kg (220 lb)	23 – 6 September 1987

Head coach

- (Croatia) Neven Spahija

Team manager

- (Bosnia and Herzegovina) Damir Mršić

Legend

- (C) Team captain
- Injured

- Roster

=== Depth chart ===
Pos.	Starting 5	Bench 1	Bench 2	Bench 3
C	Gašper Vidmar	Oğuz Savaş	Kaya Peker
PF	James Gist	Mirsad Türkcan	Berkay Candan
SF	Bojan Bogdanović	Marko Tomas
SG	Ömer Onan	Emir Preldžič	Engin Atsür
PG	Roko Ukić	Morris Finley	Hakan Demirel	Erbil Eroğlu

=== Transactions ===
==== In ====
No.	Pos.	Nat.	Name	Age	Moving from		Ends	Date	Source
44	SF	(Croatia)	Bojan Bogdanović	22	KK Cibona	(Croatia)		20 June 2011	
15	PF	(United States)	James Gist	24	Partizan	(Serbia)		20 June 2011	
5	PG	(United States)	Curtis Jerrells	24	Partizan	(Serbia)	June 2013	20 June 2011	
23	PG	(Turkey)	Hakan Demirel	25	Erdemirspor	(Turkey)	June 2012	4 August 2011	
25	SG	(Switzerland)	Thabo Sefolosha	27	Oklahoma City Thunder	(United States)	NBA lockout	13 October 2011	
5	PG	(United States)	Morris Finley	31	Armani Jeans Milano	(Italy)		2 April 2012	

==== Out ====
No.	Pos.	Nat.	Name	Age	Moving to		Date	Source
42	PF	(United States)	Sean May	27	KK Zagreb	(Croatia)		
12	C	(Lithuania)	Darjuš Lavrinovič	31	CSKA Moscow	(Russia)		
13	PG	(Lithuania)	Šarūnas Jasikevičius	35	CSKA Moscow	(Russia)		
22	G/F	(United States)	Terrence Kinsey	28	Anadolu Efes	(Turkey)		
25	SG	(Switzerland)	Thabo Sefolosha	27	Oklahoma City Thunder	(United States)	6 December 2011	
5	PG	(United States)	Curtis Jerrells	24	Murcia	(Spain)	5 March 2012	

== Overview ==
Competition	First match	Last match	Starting round	Final position	Record							
Competition	First match	Last match	Starting round	Final position	Pld	W	D	L	PF	PA	PD	Win %
Turkish Basketball League	15 October 2011	9 May 2012	Round 1	Quarterfinals	32	21	0	11	2,574	2,401	+173	65.63
Euroleague	19 October 2011	29 February 2012	Round 1	Top 16	16	8	0	8	1,205	1,218	−13	50.00
Turkish Cup	6 October 2011	14 February 2012	Group stage	Quarterfinals	4	3	0	1	322	281	+41	75.00
Presidential Cup	12 October 2011		Final	Runnersup	1	0	0	1	97	103	−6	0.00
Total					53	32	0	21	4,198	4,003	+195	60.38

Source: Competitions

=== Turkish Basketball League ===
==== League table ====
Pos	Team	Pld	W	L	PF	PA	PD	Pts	Qualification or relegation
1	Galatasaray Medical Park	30	25	5	2503	2197	+306	55	Qualification to playoffs
2	Banvit	30	25	5	2434	2174	+260	55	Qualification to playoffs
3	Anadolu Efes	30	24	6	2479	2142	+337	54	Qualification to playoffs
4	Beşiktaş Milangaz	30	22	8	2570	2321	+249	52	Qualification to playoffs
5	Fenerbahçe Ülker	30	21	9	2406	2228	+178	51	Qualification to playoffs
6	Pınar Karşıyaka	30	19	11	2529	2378	+151	49	Qualification to playoffs
7	Aliağa Petkim	30	14	16	2308	2351	−43	44	Qualification to playoffs
8	Tofaş	30	14	16	2323	2350	−27	44	Qualification to playoffs
9	Türk Telekom	30	13	17	2421	2464	−43	43	
10	Mersin BB	30	12	18	2424	2519	−95	42	
11	Erdemirspor	30	12	18	2162	2276	−114	42	
12	Hacettepe Üniversitesi	30	11	19	2145	2386	−241	41	
13	Antalya BB	30	10	20	2473	2595	−122	40	
14	Olin Edirne	30	8	22	2115	2290	−175	38	
15	Trabzonspor (R)	30	6	24	2216	2437	−221	36	Relegation to TBL
16	Bandırma Kırmızı (R)	30	4	26	2016	2416	−400	34	Relegation to TBL

Source: TBL
(R) Relegated

==== Results summary ====
Overall						Home					Away				
Pld	W	L	PF	PA	PD	W	L	PF	PA	PD	W	L	PF	PA	PD
30	21	9	2406	2228	+178	12	3	1257	1138	+119	9	6	1149	1090	+59

Source: TBF.org.tr

=== Euroleague ===
==== Group C regular season ====
===== Standing =====
	Team	Pld	W	L	PF	PA	Diff	Tie-break
1.	(Turkey) Fenerbahçe Ülker	10	6	4	785	758	+27	1−1 (+9)
2.	(Greece) Olympiacos	10	6	4	782	757	+25	1−1 (−9)
3.	(Italy) Bennet Cantù	10	5	5	724	744	−20	3−1 (+3)
4.	(Spain) Gescrap Bizkaia	10	5	5	776	755	+21	2−2 (−1)
5.	(Spain) Caja Laboral	10	5	5	792	755	+37	1−3 (−2)
6.	(France) Nancy	10	3	7	743	833	−90	

===== Fixtures/results =====
All times given below are in Central European Time.

19 October 2011
19:00

Report

Fenerbahçe Ülker (Turkey)	66–69	(Spain) Caja Laboral
Scoring by quarter: 20–12, 16–22, 12–19, 18–16
Pts: Onan 16; Rebs: Gist, Savaş 7 Asts: Ukić 2		Pts: Teletović 23; Rebs: Seraphin, Teletović 6 Asts: Prigioni 7

Abdi İpekçi Arena, Istanbul
Attendance: 3,500
Referees: Luigi Lamonica (ITA), Milivoje Jovcic (SRB), Ioannis Foufis (GRE)

27 October 2011
20:45

Report

Olympiacos (Greece)	81–74	(Turkey) Fenerbahçe Ülker
Scoring by quarter: 12–14, 14–23, 27–17, 28–20
Pts: Spanoulis 22; Rebs: Antić 12; Asts: Spanoulis 7		Pts: Sefolosha 17; Rebs: Sefolosha 12; Asts: Preldžič 7

Peace and Friendship Stadium, Piraeus
Attendance: 3,000
Referees: Dani Hierrezuelo (ESP), Paolo Taurino (ITA), Sergiy Chebyshev (UKR)

3 November 2011
18:45

Report

Fenerbahçe Ülker (Turkey)	90–86	(France) SLUC Nancy
Scoring by quarter: 23–17, 32–17, 15–27, 20–25
Pts: Sefolosha 19; Rebs: Sefolosha 5 Asts: Preldžič 12		Pts: Samnick 24; Rebs: Moerman 15; Asts: Linehan 15

Abdi İpekçi Arena, Istanbul
Attendance: 5,600
Referees: Zoran Sutulovic (MNE), Srdan Dozai (CRO), Sergey Mikhaylov (RUS)

9 November 2011
20:45

Report

Gescrap Bizkaia (Spain)	70–73	(Turkey) Fenerbahçe Ülker
Scoring by quarter: 21–26, 15–6, 22–21, 12–20
Pts: Banić 17; Rebs: Banić, Mumbrú 5 Asts: Fischer 5		Pts: Bogdanović 19; Rebs: Preldžič 8 Asts: Preldžič 3

Bilbao Arena, Bilbao
Attendance: 7,523
Referees: Ilija Belosevic (SRB), Jakub Zamojski (POL), Enrico Sabetta (ITA)

16 November 2011
19:15

Report

Fenerbahçe Ülker (Turkey)	85–83 (OT)	(Italy) Bennet Cantù
Scoring by quarter: 17–19, 15–16, 24–17, 17–21, Overtime: 12–10
Pts: Onan 18; Rebs: Sefolosha 7 Asts: Ukić, Preldžič 2		Pts: Mazzarino, Basile 12; Rebs: Three players 6 Asts: Markoishvili, Micov 3

Sinan Erdem Dome, Istanbul
Attendance: 8,355
Referees: J.R. Garcia Ortiz (ESP), Eddie Viator (FRA), Moritz Reiter (GER)

24 November 2011
20:45

Report

Caja Laboral (Spain)	90–85 (OT)	(Turkey) Fenerbahçe Ülker
Scoring by quarter: 16–14, 22–28, 16–18, 19–13, Overtime: 17–12
Pts: San Emeterio 25; Rebs: San Emeterio 8 Asts: Seraphin 4		Pts: Bogdanović 19; Rebs: Sefolosha 7 Asts: Sefolosha 4

Fernando Buesa Arena, Vitoria-Gasteiz
Attendance: 8,144
Referees: Carl Jungebrand (FIN), Boris Ryzhyk (UKR), Nicola Maestre (FRA)

1 December 2011
19:00

Report

Fenerbahçe Ülker (Turkey)	86–70	(Greece) Olympiacos
Scoring by quarter: 16–17, 26–19, 17–20, 27–14
Pts: Jerrells 17; Rebs: Gist 7 Asts: Jerrells 5		Pts: Hines 14; Rebs: Hines 7 Asts: Spanoulis, Printezis 4

Sinan Erdem Dome, Istanbul
Attendance: 14,680
Referees: Guerrino Cerebuch (ITA), M. A. Perez Perez (ESP), Vicente Bulto (ESP)

7 December 2011
21:00

Report

SLUC Nancy (France)	53–73	(Turkey) Fenerbahçe Ülker
Scoring by quarter: 15–22, 10–10, 15–17, 13–24
Pts: Shuler 17; Rebs: Akingbala 9 Asts: Linehan 4		Pts: Gist 16; Rebs: Peker, Gist 7 Asts: Preldžič 5

Palais des Sports Jean Weille, Nancy
Attendance: 6,027
Referees: Paolo Taurino (ITA), Matej Boltauzer (SLO), J.C. Garcia Gonzalez (ESP)

15 December 2011
19:00

Report

Fenerbahçe Ülker (Turkey)	70–80	(Spain) Gescrap Bizkaia
Scoring by quarter: 14–25, 19–19, 17–23, 20–13
Pts: Preldžič 19; Rebs: Preldžič 7 Asts: Jerrells 4		Pts: Fischer 16; Rebs: Fischer 10; Asts: Jackson 6

Sinan Erdem Dome, Istanbul
Attendance: 11,280
Referees: Sasa Pukl (SLO), Borys Ryzhyk (UKR), Milija Vojinovic (SRB)

22 December 2011
20:00

Report

Bennet Cantù (Italy)	76–83	(Turkey) Fenerbahçe Ülker
Scoring by quarter: 16–17, 15–14, 24–24, 21–28
Pts: Leunen, Shermadini 13; Rebs: Micov 6 Asts: Micov 4		Pts: Savaş 21; Rebs: Three players 6 Asts: Preldžič 5

Palasport di Desio, Desio
Attendance: 6,067
Referees: Jose Martín (ESP), Milivoje Jovcic (SRB), Luis Lopes (POR)

==== Group G Top 16 ====
===== Standing =====
Top 16 began in January 2012 and will conclude in March 2012.

	Team	Pld	W	L	PF	PA	Diff	Tie-break
1.	(Greece) Panathinaikos	6	4	2	436	394	+42	
2.	(Russia) UNICS	6	3	3	432	423	+9	1–1 (+10)
3.	(Italy) EA7 Milano	6	3	3	379	390	−11	1–1 (–10)
4.	(Turkey) Fenerbahçe Ülker	6	2	4	420	460	−40	

===== Fixtures/results =====
18 January 2012
17:00

Report

UNICS Kazan (Russia)	76–71	(Turkey) Fenerbahçe Ülker
Scoring by quarter: 15–18, 9–23, 29–15, 23–15
Pts: Veremeenko 17; Rebs: Veremeenko 11; Asts: Samoylenko 10		Pts: Bogdanović 24; Rebs: Savaş 6 Asts: Jerrells 4

Basket Hall Arena, Kazan
Attendance: 5,000
Referees: Juan Carlos Garcia Gonzalez (ESP), Eddie Viator (FRA), Damir Javor (SLO)

25 January 2012
20:00

Report

Fenerbahçe Ülker (Turkey)	65–63	(Italy) EA7 Emporio Armani
Scoring by quarter: 12–10, 18–18, 16–15, 19–20
Pts: Bogdanović 17; Rebs: Türkcan 12; Asts: Ukić, Preldžič 2		Pts: Fotsis, Rocca 16; Rebs: Rocca 11; Asts: Cook 8

Fenerbahçe Ülker City, Istanbul
Attendance: 12,191
Referees: Miguel Perez Perez (ESP), Fernando Rocha (POR), Robert Vyklicky (CZE)

2 February 2012
19:30

Report

Fenerbahçe Ülker (Turkey)	56–77	(Greece) Panathinaikos
Scoring by quarter: 9–24, 13–12, 21–22, 13–19
Pts: Jerrells 12; Rebs: Türkcan 8 Asts: Ukić, Atsür 3		Pts: Kaimakoglou 19; Rebs: Sato 10; Asts: Diamantidis 8

Fenerbahçe Ülker City, Istanbul
Attendance: 11,917
Referees: Luigi Lamonica (ITA), Borys Ryzhyk (UKR), LATISEVS, Latisevs (LAT)

9 February 2012
20:45

Report

Panathinaikos (Greece)	72–62	(Turkey) Fenerbahçe Ülker
Scoring by quarter: 24–16, 16–14, 18–16, 14–19
Pts: Tsartsaris 21; Rebs: Sato, Batiste 6 Asts: Diamantidis 5		Pts: Bogdanovic 15; Rebs: Turkcan 13; Asts: Four players 2

Olympic Indoor Hall, Athens
Attendance: 12,500
Referees: Grzegorz Ziemblicki (POL), Robert Lottermoser (GER), Boris Shulga (UKR)

23 February 2012
20:45

Report

Fenerbahçe Ülker (Turkey)	94–87 (OT)	(Russia) UNICS Kazan
Scoring by quarter: 21–26, 21–18, 13–24, 24–11, Overtime: 15–8
Pts: Bogdanović 20; Rebs: Türkcan 13; Asts: Türkcan, Preldžić		Pts: Greer 33; Rebs: Greer, McCarty 6 Asts: Greer 6

Fenerbahçe Ülker City, Istanbul
Attendance: 11,870
Referees: Sasa Pukl (SLO), Milivoje Jovcic (SRB), Vicente Bulto (ESP)

29 February 2012
18:30

Report

EA7 Emporio Armani (Italy)	85–72	(Turkey) Fenerbahçe Ülker
Scoring by quarter: 20–21, 26–19, 20–15, 19–17
Pts: Hairston 27; Rebs: three players 5 Asts: Cook 8		Pts: Preldžič 15; Rebs: Gist 9 Asts: Preldžič 5

Mediolanum Forum, Milan
Attendance: 2,500
Referees: Jose Martin (ESP),Ilija Belosevic (SRB),Milija Vojinovic (SRB)

=== Turkish Basketball Cup ===
==== Group B ====
===== Standing =====
Pos	Team	Pld	W	L	PF	PA	PD	Pts	Qualification
1	Fenerbahçe Ülker	3	3	0	253	199	+54	6	Advance to Final 8
2	Tofaş	3	1	2	223	238	−15	4	Advance to Final 8
3	Mersin BŞB	3	1	2	224	232	−8	4	
4	Olin Edirne	3	1	2	205	236	−31	4	

Source: Turkish Basketball Federation
