= 2010–11 Euroleague Top 16 Group H =

Standings and Results for Group H of the Top 16 phase of the 2010–11 Euroleague basketball tournament.

== Standings ==
Key to colors
Top two places in each group advance to Quarterfinals

	Team	Pld	W	L	PF	PA	Diff	Tie-break
1.	(Greece) Olympiacos	6	5	1	461	418	+43	
2.	(Spain) Power Electronics Valencia	6	3	3	449	438	+11	1−1 +12
3.	(Turkey) Fenerbahçe Ülker	6	3	3	456	462	−6	1−1 −12
4.	(Lithuania) Žalgiris	6	1	5	418	466	−48	

== Fixtures and results ==
All times given below are in Central European Time.

Unless otherwise indicated, all attendance totals are from the corresponding match report posted on the official Euroleague site and included with each game summary.

=== Game 1 ===
19 January 2011
20:45

Report

Power Electronics Valencia (Spain)	73–59	(Lithuania) Žalgiris
Scoring by quarter: 20–21, 19–10, 15–19, 19–9
Pts: Savanović 20; Rebs: Lishouk 12; Asts: Cook, Martínez 4		Pts: Pocius 9 Rebs: Collins 7 Asts: Collins 4

Pabellon Municipal Fuente San Luis, Valencia
Attendance: 7,400
Referees: Recep Ankarali (TUR), Paolo Taurino (ITA), Fernando Rocha (POR)

20 January 2011
20:45

Report

Olympiacos (Greece)	70–84	(Turkey) Fenerbahçe Ülker
Scoring by quarter: 18–16, 15–17, 25–22, 12–29
Pts: Papaloukas 15; Rebs: three players 5 Asts: Spanoulis 4		Pts: Tomas 19; Rebs: Preldžič 7 Asts: Ukić 4

Peace and Friendship Stadium, Piraeus
Attendance: 8,000
Referees: Juan Carlos Mitjana (ESP), Jakub Zamojski (POL), Eddie Viator (FRA)

=== Game 2 ===
26 January 2011
18:45

Report

Žalgiris (Lithuania)	64–71	(Greece) Olympiacos
Scoring by quarter: 16–23, 6–17, 21–16, 21–15
Pts: Pocius 17; Rebs: Marjanović 7 Asts: Pocius 4		Pts: Spanoulis 17; Rebs: Nesterović 8 Asts: Spanoulis 4

Kaunas Sports Hall, Kaunas
Attendance: 5,000
Referees: José Martín (ESP), Sasa Pukl (SLO), Roberto Chiari (ITA)

27 January 2011
20:45

Report

Fenerbahçe Ülker (Turkey)	75–73	(Spain) Power Electronics Valencia
Scoring by quarter: 21–20, 16–13, 17–19, 21–21
Pts: Onan 22; Rebs: Lavrinovič 9 Asts: Peker 5		Pts: Martínez 14; Rebs: Savanović, Javtokas 7 Asts: Cook 7

Sinan Erdem Dome, Istanbul
Attendance: 15,600
Referees: Guerrino Cerebuch (ITA), Ilija Belosevic (SRB), Sinisa Herceg (CRO)

=== Game 3 ===
2 February 2011
19:15

Report

Fenerbahçe Ülker (Turkey)	80–72	(Lithuania) Žalgiris
Scoring by quarter: 22–19, 19–22, 17–13, 22–18
Pts: Tomas, Savaş 15; Rebs: Türkcan 14; Asts: Ukić 4		Pts: Jakūnas, Collins 14; Rebs: Jakūnas, Watson 6 Asts: Pocius 4

Sinan Erdem Dome, Istanbul
Attendance: 15,560
Referees: Luigi Lamonica (ITA), Dani Hierrezuelo (ESP), Milija Vojinovic (SRB)

2 February 2011
20:45

Report

Olympiacos (Greece)	77–62	(Spain) Power Electronics Valencia
Scoring by quarter: 18–12, 20–12, 19–18, 20–20
Pts: Nesterović 17; Rebs: Bourousis 7 Asts: Papaloukas 9		Pts: Claver 16; Rebs: Claver 8 Asts: Cook 4

Peace and Friendship Stadium, Piraeus
Attendance: 5000
Referees: Fabio Facchini (ITA), Sreten Radovic (CRO), Tolga Sahin (TUR)

=== Game 4 ===
16 February 2011
19:45

Report

Žalgiris (Lithuania)	85–84 (OT)	(Turkey) Fenerbahçe Ülker
Scoring by quarter: 15–11, 15–20, 19–18, 20–20, Overtime: 16–15
Pts: Pocius, Delininkaitis 13; Rebs: Jankūnas 7 Asts: Kalnietis 4		Pts: Onan 23; Rebs: Savaş, Preldžič 6 Asts: Preldžič 6

Kaunas Sports Hall, Kaunas
Attendance: 5,000
Referees: Christos Christodoulou (GRE), Borys Ryzhyk (UKR), Matej Boltauzer (SLO)

17 February 2011
20:45

Report

Power Electronics Valencia (Spain)	79–85	(Greece) Olympiacos
Scoring by quarter: 17–20, 20–17, 18–16, 24–32
Pts: Claver, Savanović 16; Rebs: Claver, Javtokas 6 Asts: Cook 5		Pts: Spanoulis 18; Rebs: Nesterovič, Bourousis 6 Asts: Papaloukas 6

Pabellon Municipal Fuente San Luis, Valencia
Attendance: 9,000
Referees: Luigi Lamonica (ITA), Milivoje Jovcic (SRB), Damir Javor (SLO)

=== Game 5 ===
24 February 2011
19:45

Report

Žalgiris (Lithuania)	74–80	(Spain) Power Electronics Valencia
Scoring by quarter: 17–18, 20–17, 17–23, 20–22
Pts: Collins 15; Rebs: Klimavičius 8 Asts: Delininkaitis 5		Pts: Richardson, de Colo 17; Rebs: three players 5 Asts: Cook 12

Kaunas Sports Hall, Kaunas
Attendance: 5,000
Referees: Grzegorz Ziemblicki (POL), Boris Shulga (UKR), Carmelo Paternico (ITA)

24 February 2011
19:15

Report

Fenerbahçe Ülker (Turkey)	65–80	(Greece) Olympiacos
Scoring by quarter: 18–20, 18–14, 19–20, 10–26
Pts: Ukić 14; Rebs: Kinsey 6 Asts: Ukić 4		Pts: Erceg 19; Rebs: Nesterović 9 Asts: Papaloukas 8

Sinan Erdem Dome, Istanbul
Attendance: 15,870
Referees: Juan Carlos Arteaga (ESP), Paolo Taurino (ITA), Antonio Conde (ESP)

=== Game 6 ===
3 March 2011
19:45

Report

Power Electronics Valencia (Spain)	82–68	(Turkey) Fenerbahçe Ülker
Scoring by quarter: 15–15, 24–17, 20–20, 23–16
Pts: de Colo, Javtokas 15; Rebs: Lishouk 8 Asts: Cook 11		Pts: Preldžič 20; Rebs: Tomas 8 Asts: Ukić 4

Pabellon Municipal Fuente San Luis, Valencia
Attendance: 9,000
Referees: Zoran Sutulovic (MNE), Guerrino Cerebuch (ITA), Fernando Rocha (POR)

3 March 2011
19:45

Report

Olympiacos (Greece)	78–64	(Lithuania) Žalgiris
Scoring by quarter: 19–20, 22–14, 17–15, 20–15
Pts: Nesterović 20; Rebs: Gordon 6 Asts: Papaloukas 7		Pts: Kalnietis 16; Rebs: Plaisted 10; Asts: Collins 6

Peace and Friendship Stadium, Piraeus
Attendance: 4,000
Referees: José Martín (ESP), Roberto Chiari (ITA), Olegs Latisevs (LAT)
