= Sam Presti =

American basketball executive (born 1977)

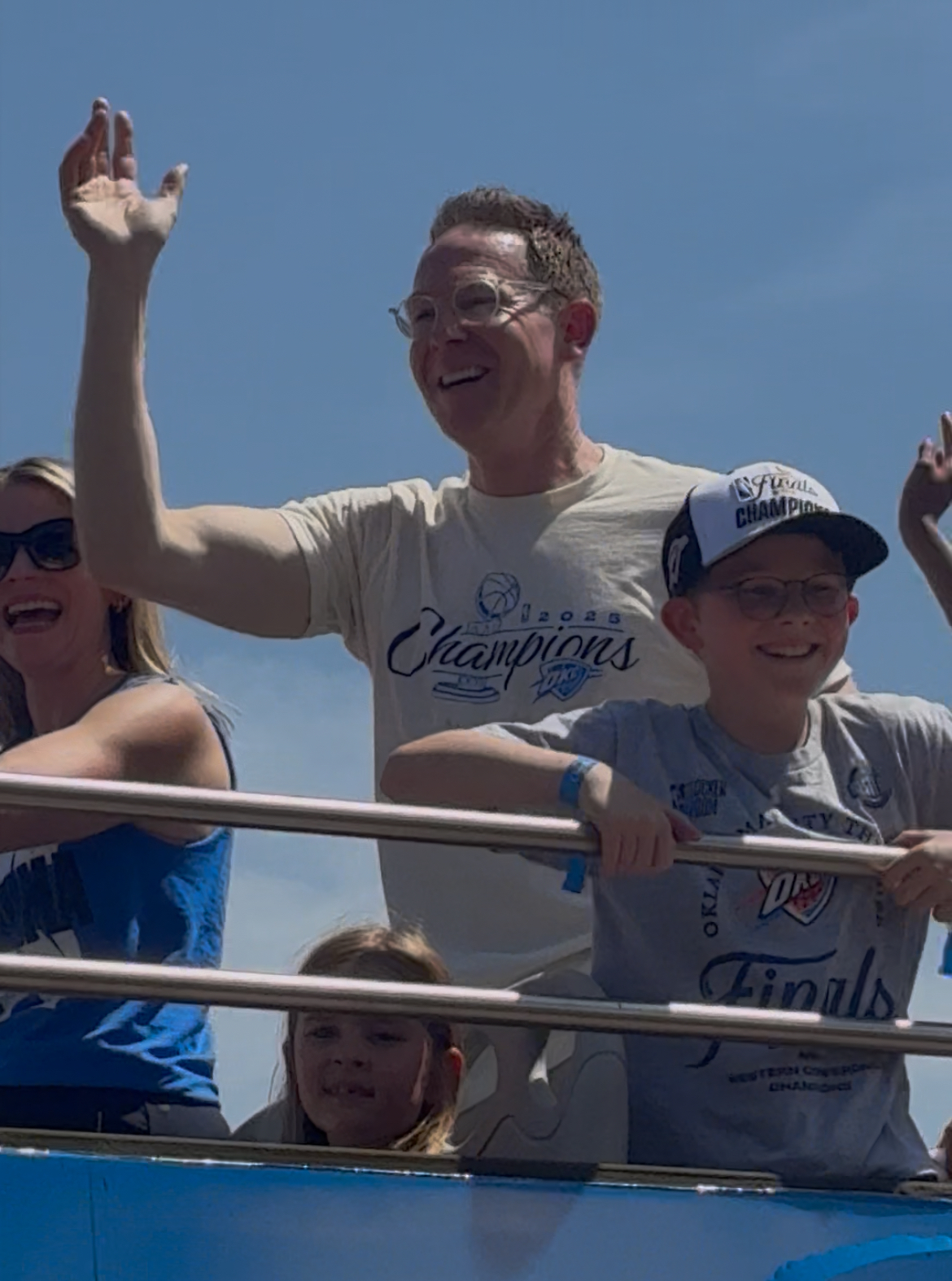
- Presti in 2025

Oklahoma City Thunder
- Positions: Executive Vice President & General Manager
- League: NBA

Personal information
- Born: November 1, 1977 (age 49) Concord, Massachusetts, U.S.
- Listed height: 6 ft 1 in (1.85 m)

Career information
- High school: Concord-Carlisle (Concord, Massachusetts)
- College: Virginia Wesleyan (1995–1997); Emerson (1997–1999)

Career highlights
- As general manager: NBA champion (2025); NBA Executive of the Year (2025); As assistant general manager: 3× NBA champion (2003, 2005, 2007)

Samuel Presti (born November 1, 1977) is an American basketball executive who is the executive vice president and general manager for the Oklahoma City Thunder of the National Basketball Association (NBA). He was hired as GM in 2007 at the age of thirty, which made him the second-youngest GM in NBA history. As of 2025, Presti is the third-longest tenured head of basketball operations in the league. Under his leadership, the Thunder won their first NBA championship in 2025.

== Early life ==
Presti played basketball for Emerson College and Virginia Wesleyan College. After two seasons at Virginia Wesleyan, Presti transferred to Emerson, attributing his passion for music as his reason. At Emerson, Presti graduated with a bachelor's degree in communications, politics, and law.

In 1998, while at Emerson College, Presti released a jazz-rap album titled “Milk Money” through the label Relativity Records. Mike Tucker (saxophone) and Matthew Morin (piano) played instruments on the album. The following year, Presti released a second album titled “All Things Considered”. In 2025, “Milk Money” leaked online, but was removed shortly after.

== Executive career ==
=== San Antonio Spurs (2000–2007) ===
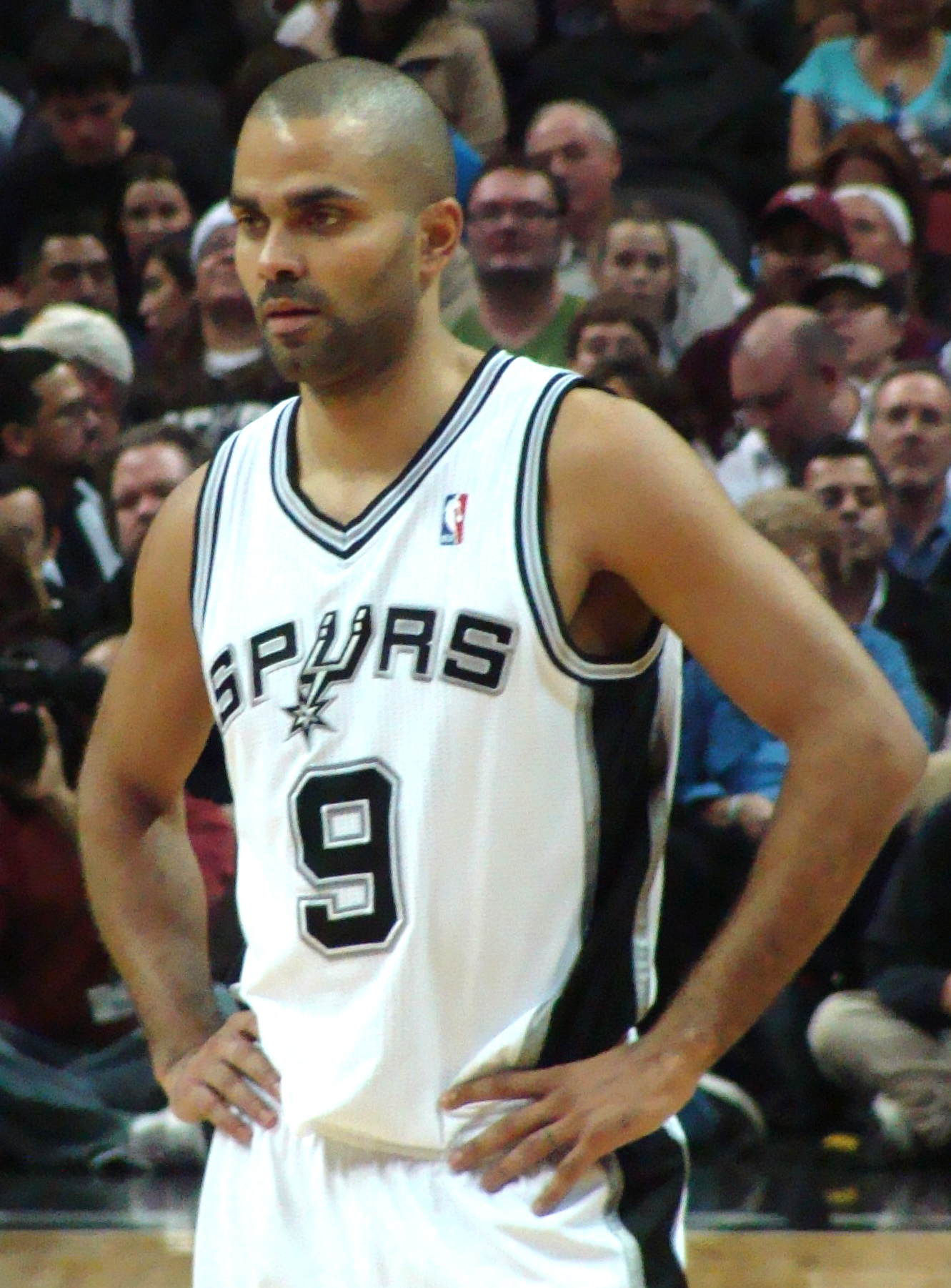
Presti was heavily credited for the Spurs drafting of Tony Parker.

After graduating from Emerson College, Presti was working at a basketball camp before being offered an internship by San Antonio Spurs general manager R.C. Buford. Buford was refereeing a game as Presti delivered a sales pitch while running along the court with Buford. Starting as a video coordinator for Spurs head coach Gregg Popovich, Presti rose through the front office ranks, becoming assistant director of scouting in 2002, and later moved to director of player personnel in 2003. He was finally elevated to the position of Vice President and Assistant General Manager in 2005. Before the 2001 NBA draft, Presti was instrumental in encouraging the Spurs to draft Tony Parker. Presti would show up at Buford's home with footage of Parker during his tenure with Paris Basket Racing. Parker went on to play 18 seasons in the NBA, making six All-Star teams, and winning four NBA championships. During Parker's jersey retirement, he acknowledged Presti's recommendation for the Spurs to draft him.

“Sam, I know you’re in the arena,” Parker said Monday, illuminated by a spotlight in the middle of the court. “Man, you and R.C. (Buford, former Spurs general manager and current CEO), you were ahead of your time. You took a gamble on me, because I was terrible in my first workout with the Spurs. Man, I was terrible."

— Tony Parker

As a member of the Spurs, Presti was part of the 2003, 2005, and 2007 Spurs championship teams, including five division titles.

=== Seattle SuperSonics / Oklahoma City Thunder (2007–present) ===
On June 7, 2007, the Seattle SuperSonics named Presti as the newest general manager after former general manager Rick Sund was demoted to a consultant. Sonics owner Clay Bennett viewed Presti as "thoughtful, methodical, and measured" who had "an important role within [the Spurs] and contributed to their winning and how they do business." While Sonics president Lenny Wilkens interviewed others, Bennett, who had been a partner in the Spurs organization, interviewed and was impressed by Presti enough to demote Wilkens to "vice chairman" to give Presti full power. With the hiring, Presti became the league's at-the-time youngest general manager, and second youngest in NBA history behind Jerry Colangelo.

Entering the 2007 NBA draft, the Sonics were transitioning into a rebuilding phase following a 31–51 record in the 2006-07 season. On draft night, Presti completed his first trade by acquiring Jeff Green, the 5th overall pick, in a blockbuster trade involving Sonics guard Ray Allen. Green joined Kevin Durant, the 2nd overall pick, in Seattle as Presti's first two draftees in his career. Presti then signed and traded forward Rashard Lewis to the Magic in exchange for a second-round pick and a created a $9 million trade exception. He then traded that pick to the Suns for Kurt Thomas and two future first-round picks, one of the picks becoming future Thunder forward Serge Ibaka. To finish his first offseason, Presti hired Spurs assistant coach P.J. Carlesimo who worked with Presti in San Antonio. The Sonics finished the 2007-08 season with a 20–62 record, their worst record in franchise history. Presti's first draft pick, Durant, was named NBA Rookie of the Year at the end of the season.

After the season, Presti made his final appearance with the Sonics in the 2008 NBA draft, drafting Russell Westbrook, the 4th overall pick, and Serge Ibaka, the 24th overall pick. Before the start of the 2008-09 season, the franchise relocated to Oklahoma City, Oklahoma, in July 2008, becoming the Oklahoma City Thunder.

==== Rise to contention ====
In Presti's first season in Oklahoma City, the Thunder fired P.J. Carlesimo following a 1–12 start and named Scott Brooks as interim coach. Under Brooks, the Thunder finished the season 23–59 with Russell Westbrook being named to the NBA All-Rookie First Team. Brooks was later permanently named as head coach for the Thunder. In the 2009 NBA draft, the Thunder drafted James Harden with the 3rd overall pick. Kevin Durant, Russell Westbrook, and Harden would later go on to form a "Big 3" in Oklahoma City, aided with the additions of Serge Ibaka and Thabo Sefolosha. After their inaugural season, the Thunder experienced one of the largest turnarounds, improving to a 50–32 record and clinching their first playoff berth as the eighth seed. The Thunder became the youngest team in NBA history to qualify for the playoffs. During the season, Kevin Durant was named an All-Star and became the youngest scoring leader in NBA history, at 21-years old. At the end of the season, Durant was named to the All-NBA First Team, head coach Scott Brooks was named NBA Coach of the Year, James Harden was named to the NBA All-Rookie Second Team, and Thabo Sefolosha was named to the NBA All-Defensive Second Team.

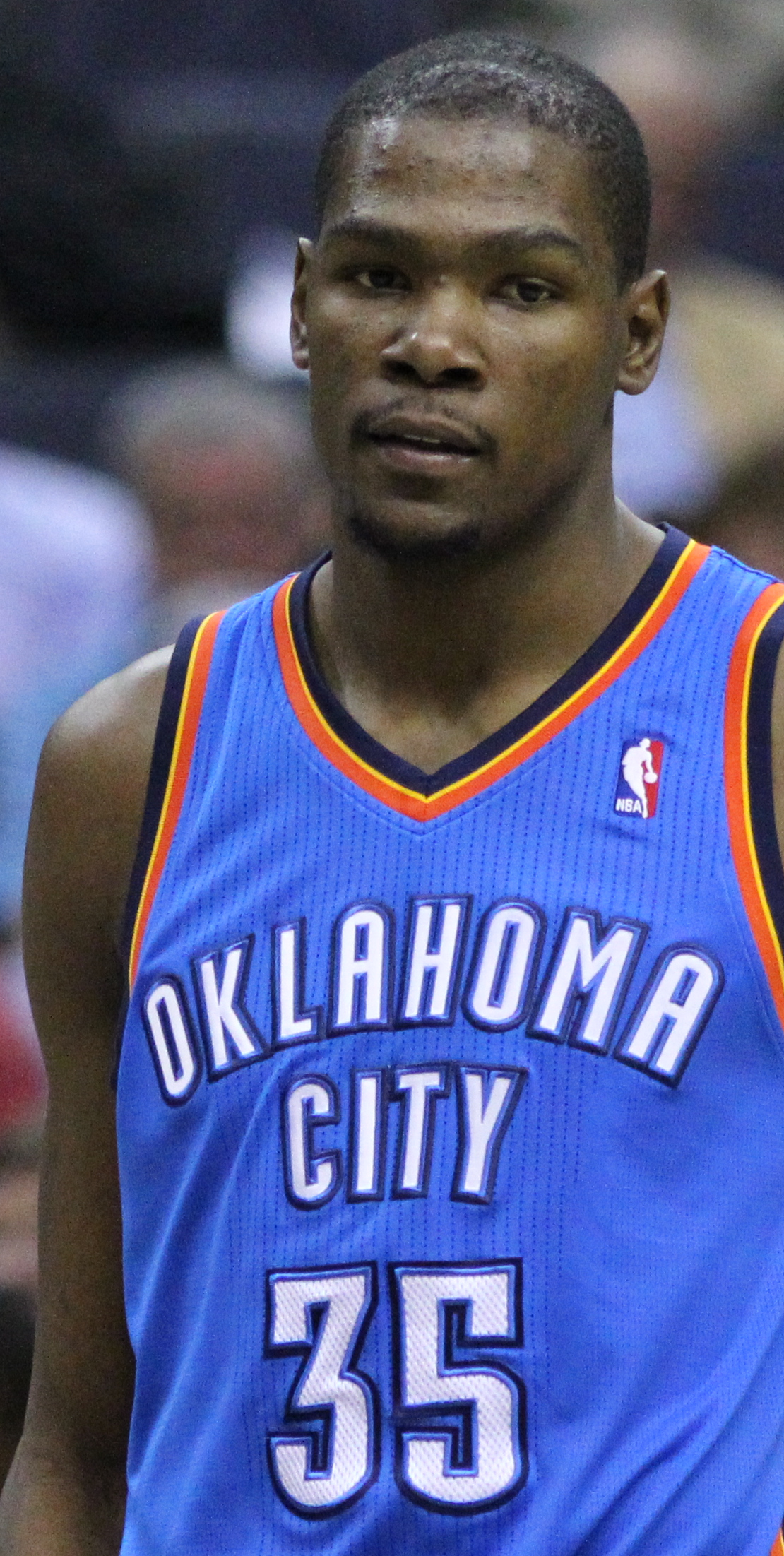
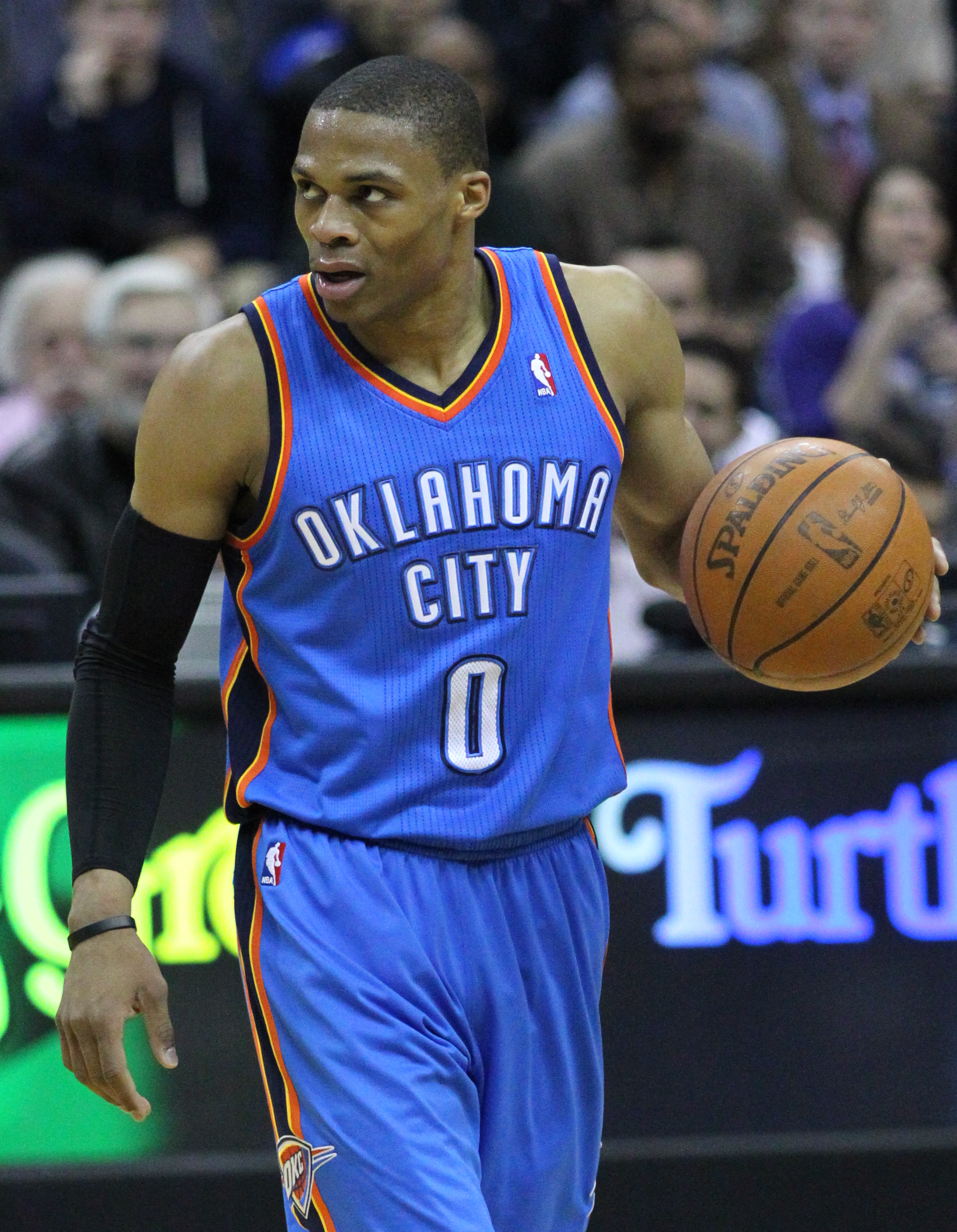
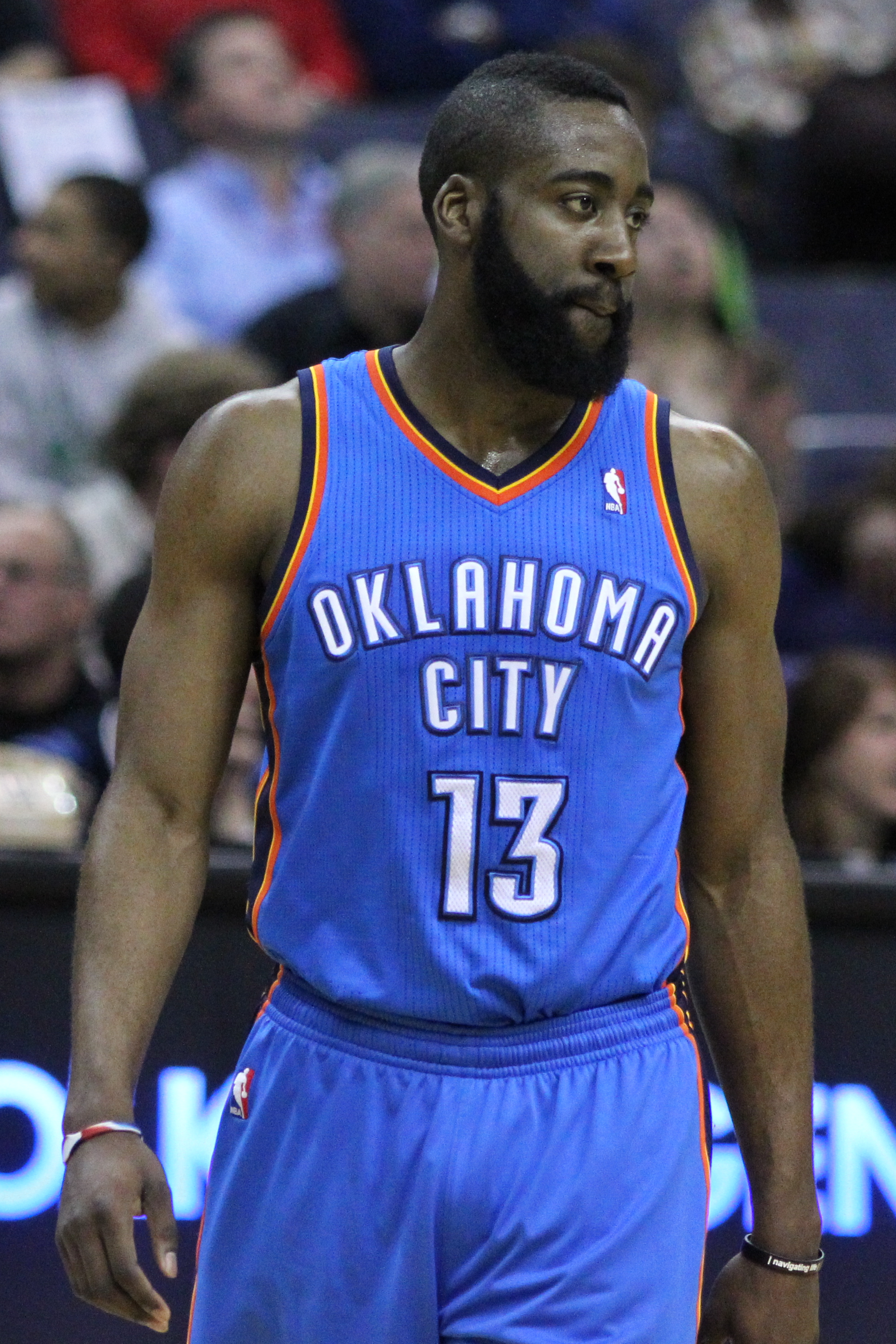
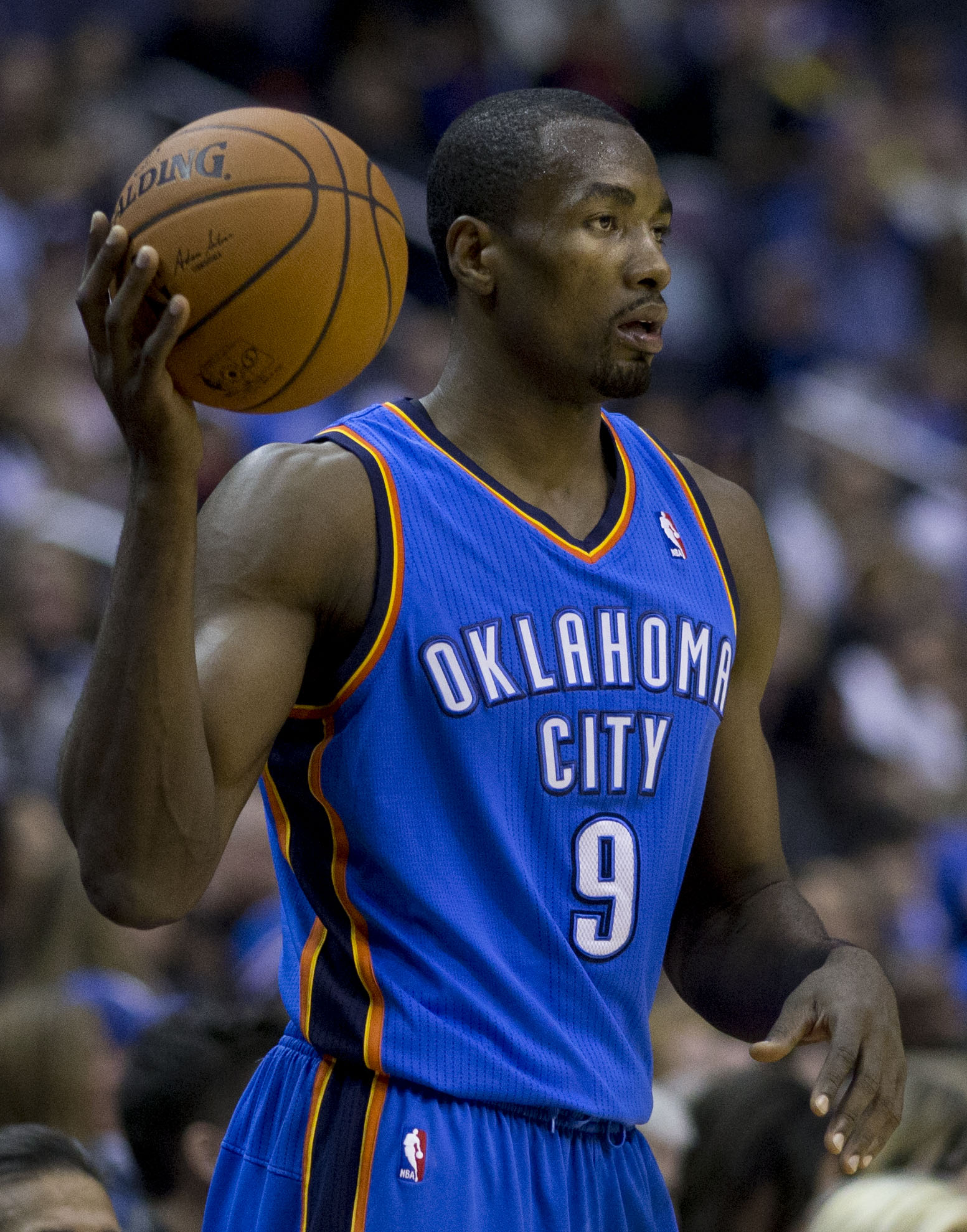
Presti drafted Kevin Durant, Russell Westbrook, James Harden, and Serge Ibaka from 2007-2009

In their third season in Oklahoma City, the Thunder finished 55–27 with Russell Westbrook being named to his first All-Star game. Building off last season, the Thunder reached the Western Conference finals as the 4th seed and became the second-youngest team to do so. However, the Thunder lost to the eventual champions Dallas Mavericks in five games. After the 2011 NBA lockout, the Thunder continued their recent success and clinched the second seed with a 47–19 record. Prior to the playoffs, James Harden was named NBA Sixth Man of the Year, Kevin Durant won his third consecutive scoring title and named to his third All-NBA First Team, Russell Westbrook was named to his second All-NBA Second Team and Serge Ibaka was named to his first All-Defensive First Team. In the playoffs, the Thunder swept the defending champions Dallas Mavericks, defeated the Los Angeles Lakers in five games, and came back down two games to defeat the San Antonio Spurs in the Western Conference finals to advance to the NBA Finals for the first time since 1996 when the franchise was in Seattle. Against the Miami Heat, the Thunder won Game 1 but lost the next four and the series in five games.

==== Durant and Westbrook era ====
A year away from restricted free agency following the 2012-13 season, Presti and James Harden were unable to work out a contract extension prior to the start of the season. Presti offered a four-year, $55 million extension which was $4.5 million less than the max contract that Harden coveted. Due to the NBA's luxury tax, the Thunder were unwilling to offer a max extension to Harden in order to avoid paying hefty taxes. After 2012 preseason, the Thunder traded Harden to the Houston Rockets in exchange for Kevin Martin, Jeremy Lamb, a 2013 first-round pick, a 2013 second-round pick, and a 2014 first-round pick. Presti and the Thunder management faced heavy criticism throughout Harden's tenure in Houston for the trade and for breaking up the team's "Big 3." Harden would later go on to win an MVP with the Rockets in 2018. Despite the trade, the Thunder finished the season with a 60–22 record, finishing first in the Western Conference and second overall in the league. Against Harden and the Rockets in the playoffs, Russell Westbrook collided with Patrick Beverley and suffered a season-ending injury. The Thunder eventually fell to the Memphis Grizzlies in the second round, falling short of their finals appearance from last season. In the 2013-14 season, the Thunder finished with a 59–23 record as Kevin Durant was named NBA Most Valuable Player however the Thunder lost in the conference finals in a rematch with the San Antonio Spurs. After an injury-riddled 2014-15 season, Presti fired head coach Scott Brooks after seven season with the team which highlighted a finals appearance, three conference finals appearance and an NBA Coach of the Year award. To replace Brooks, Presti hired Billy Donovan for the 2015-16 season. The Thunder clinched the third seed with a 55–27 record, returning to the playoffs after missing it last season. In the playoffs, the Thunder defeated the Dallas Mavericks in five games and defeated the 67-win San Antonio Spurs in six games. Making their fourth conference finals appearance in six years, the Thunder led the defending champions Golden State Warriors who went 73–9 in the regular season with a 3–1 series lead. The Thunder would later go on to lose the next three games and lose the series in seven. After the season, Serge Ibaka was traded and Kevin Durant controversially left the Thunder after spending nine seasons with the organization, one year in Seattle.

Kevin made an indelible mark on the Thunder organization and the state of Oklahoma as a founding father of this franchise. We can't adequately articulate what he meant to the foundation of this franchise and our success. While clearly disappointing that he has chosen to move on, the core values that he helped establish only lead to us thanking him for the many tangible and intangible ways that he helped our program.

— Sam Presti

==== End of first Thunder iteration ====
With Durant's departure, Presti and Russell Westbrook agreed to a renegotiation-and-extension of his contract worth $85.7 million after speculations whether Westbrook would be traded. In absence of Durant, Westbrook broke Oscar Robertson's most triple-doubles in a season with 42 and was named NBA Most Valuable Player after the Thunder's first round loss. To improve Westbrook's supporting cast, the Thunder traded for All-Star Paul George and Carmelo Anthony. George was traded by the Indiana Pacers following rumors of wanting to leave next season in free agency for the Los Angeles Lakers. However, Presti decided to gamble and traded for him to entice him to re-sign long term. George would later re-sign with the Thunder next offseason.

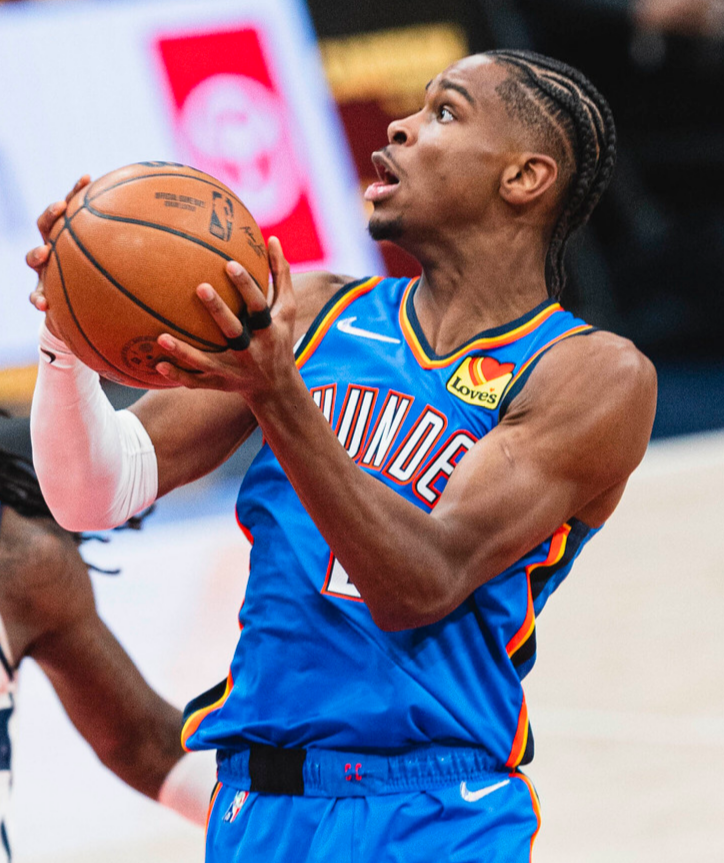
Presti's acquisition of Shai Gilgeous-Alexander and Jalen Williams marks the second iteration of the Thunder since relocating.

==== Young core rebuild ====
After three disappointing seasons after Durant's departure, Presti traded Paul George to the Los Angeles Clippers in exchange for Shai Gilgeous-Alexander, Danilo Gallinari, a 2021 first-round pick via MIA, a 2022 first-round pick via LAC, a 2023 first-round pick via MIA, rights to swap 2023 first-round picks with LAC, a 2024 first-round pick via LAC, rights to swap 2025 first-round picks with LAC and a 2026 first-round pick via LAC. Following George's trade, Presti then traded Russell Westbrook to the Houston Rockets in exchange for Chris Paul, rights to swap 2021 first-round picks, a 2024 first-round pick, rights to swap 2025 first-round picks and a 2026 first-round pick. This trade reunited Westbrook with former teammate James Harden in Houston. With the trade of Westbrook, the Thunder effectively "ended" their first iteration of the team in Oklahoma City since moving from Seattle. After an unexpected 2019-20 season, Presti began a rebuilding process with the Thunder, trading away key veterans in Chris Paul, who made an All-Star game and an All-NBA selection, Steven Adams, Danilo Gallinari, and Dennis Schröder. Before the start of the 2020-21 season, Presti and head coach Billy Donovan mutually agreed to part ways after five seasons as the team transitioned into a rebuilding phase. Mark Daigneault was later named as the team's new head coach, marking the fourth coach in Thunder history.

Building around Shai Gilgeous-Alexander, the Thunder had their own lottery pick, the first since 2014, and selected Josh Giddey, the 6th overall pick, in the 2021 NBA draft. Throughout the 2020 and 2022 seasons, Presti gained a reputation for acquiring numerous draft picks adding up to 38 future picks, 19 in the first round and 19 in the second round. In the 2022 NBA draft, Presti drafted Chet Holmgren, the 2nd overall pick, and Jalen Williams, the 12th overall pick. During the 2022-23 season, Shai Gilgeous-Alexander emerged as a star, being named to his first All-Star game, an All-NBA First Team nomination, and led the Thunder to a 40–42 record. After narrowly missing the playoffs, the Thunder entered the draft lottery for the third consecutive year. In the 2023 NBA draft, Presti acquired the draft rights to Cason Wallace, the 10th overall pick in a trade with the Dallas Mavericks. On June 21, 2024, Presti traded Giddey to the Chicago Bulls in exchange for guard Alex Caruso. The following season the Thunder won the 2025 NBA Finals marking Presti’s first championship as a GM.

== Personal life ==
Presti and his wife, Shannon, have a son and twin daughters. His wife currently serves as the Teen Leadership Initiatives Coordinator for the YMCA of Greater Oklahoma City.

Sporting positions
Preceded by Rick Sund	Seattle SuperSonics General Manager; 2007–2008	Position relocated
Preceded by Himself as Seattle SuperSonics	Oklahoma City Thunder General Manager; 2008–present	Incumbent
