= Turkish Basketball Cup Final MVP =

Basketeball award to a player

The Turkish Basketball Cup Final MVP is an award that is given to the most outstanding player in the Final of the Turkish Basketball Cup. The award is handed out since the 2010–11 season.

== Winners ==
Note: Flags indicate national team eligibility at FIBA-sanctioned events. Players may hold other non-FIBA nationalities not displayed.

| Season | Nat. | Player | Pos. | Club | Ref. | Pnt. | Reb. | Ass. |
|---|---|---|---|---|---|---|---|---|
| 2010–11 | (Turkey) | Emir Preldžič | G/F | Fenerbahçe Ülker | | 35 | 3 | 4 |
| 2011–12 | (Turkey) | Serhat Çetin | G/F | Beşiktaş Milangaz | | 14 | 1 | 3 |
| 2012–13 | (Australia) | David Andersen | C | Fenerbahçe Ülker | | 21 | 5 | 2 |
| 2013–14 | (Turkey) | Bobby Dixon | PG | Pınar Karşıyaka | | 19 | 5 | 6 |
| 2014–15 | (France) | Thomas Heurtel | PG | Anadolu Efes | | 12 | 1 | 6 |
| 2016 | (Serbia) | Bogdan Bogdanović | SG | Fenerbahçe | | 21 | 4 | 0 |
| 2017 | (North Macedonia) | Jordan Theodore | PG | Banvit | | 19 | 9 | 5 |
| 2018 | (Croatia) | Krunoslav Simon | SG | Anadolu Efes | | 19 | 5 | 7 |
| 2019 | (Italy) | Luigi Datome | SF | Fenerbahçe Beko | | 22 | 7 | 4 |
| 2020 | (Italy) | Luigi Datome | SF | Fenerbahçe Beko | | 15 | 5 | 0 |
| 2021 | Cancelled due to the COVID-19 pandemic. | | | | | | | |
| 2022 | (Germany) | Tibor Pleiß | C | Anadolu Efes | | 20 | 8 | 0 |
| 2023 | Cancelled after the 2023 Turkey–Syria earthquake. | | | | | | | |
| 2024 | (Greece) | Nick Calathes | PG | Fenerbahçe Beko | | 10 | 11 | 7 |
| 2025 | (United States) | Nigel Hayes-Davis | PF | Fenerbahçe Beko | | 22 | 9 | 3 |
| 2026 | (Turkey) | Tarik Biberović | SF | Fenerbahçe Beko | | 28 | 10 | 2 |

== Awards won by nationality ==
| Country | Total |
|---|---|
| Turkey | 4 |
| Italy | 2 |
| Australia | 1 |
| Croatia | 1 |
| France | 1 |
| Germany | 1 |
| Greece | 1 |
| North Macedonia | 1 |
| Serbia | 1 |
| United States | 1 |

== Awards won by club ==
| Club | Total |
|---|---|
| Fenerbahçe | 8 |
| Anadolu Efes | 3 |
| Pınar Karşıyaka | 1 |
| Banvit | 1 |
| Beşiktaş | 1 |
