= Christine Sefolosha =

Swiss painter

Christine Sefolosha (born 1955) is a Swiss painter, born in Montreux.

== Work and exhibitions ==
Her works have been shown at numerous one person and group exhibitions, including at the Cavin Morris Gallery in New York City, American Visionary Art Museum in Baltimore her works belongs to prominent art collections The Audrey B.Heckler Collection see The Hidden Art published by SkiraRizzoli,New York,text by Colin Rhodes, Valérie Rousseau, Jane Kallir. This collection is now part of AFAM, American folk art Museum. Galerie Polad-Hardouin in Paris. and the Halle Saint-Pierre

She showed her work at the Judy Saslow Gallery in Chicago. In 2009 she was introduced to Bruxelles's J. Bastien Art Gallery. She founded the studio Quai 1-L'Atelier in 2000 within Montreux' train-station waiting room. From 2007 She showed her work and was part of artists regular exhibited at the Polad-Hardouin Gallery in Paris. "Les Yeux ouverts" 2007, Monographic exhibition at Halle Saint Pierre, Paris,2007 She showed her works in Vaisseaux fantômes,one person exhibition at Polad Hardouin Gallery,Paris,2010-2011, She had subsequent one person show at Polad-hardouin,Paris : "Waldszenen"2014. In Paris she has showed on several occasions at Halle Saint Pierre,

== Personal life ==
Sefolosha is the mother of Thabo Sefolosha, former NBA player who played for the Houston Rockets, Utah Jazz, Atlanta Hawks, Oklahoma City Thunder, and Chicago Bulls.

Sefolosha lived in South Africa for nine years.
