= 2011–12 Turkish Basketball Cup =

Turkish Cup Basketball 2011–12
- League: Turkish Basketball Men Cup
- Sport: Basketball
- Teams: 16
- TV partner: Sports TV
- Season champions: Beşiktaş Milangaz
- Top scorer: (United States) Corey Fisher

Final
- Champions: Beşiktaş Milangaz
- Runners-up: Banvit
- Finals MVP: (Turkey) Serhat Çetin

Turkish Basketball Men Cup seasons
- ← 2010–11 2012–13 →

2011–12 Spor Toto Turkish Cup is the 26th edition of the TBF Men's Turkish Cup, and the debut of Beşiktaş Milangaz bringing home their first Turkish Cup Basketball win for the club.

TBF

== Group stage ==
Group B and D matches played 6–8 October; group A and C matches played 9–11 October 2011.

=== Group A ===
Group A matches played in Eskişehir.

Pos	Team	Pld	W	L	PF	PA	PD	Pts	Qualification
1	Beşiktaş	3	3	0	251	218	+33	6	Advance to Final 8
2	Banvit	3	2	1	235	205	+30	5	Advance to Final 8
3	Hacettepe Üniversitesi	3	1	2	201	250	−49	4	
4	Trabzonspor	3	0	3	200	214	−14	3	

Source: Turkish Basketball Federation

October 9, 2011
17:30 EET

Boxscore

Hacettepe Üniversitesi	59–90	Banvit

Anadolu University Sports Hall

October 9, 2011
20:00 EET

Boxscore

Besiktas Milangaz	78–67	Trabzonspor

Anadolu University Sports Hall

October 10, 2011
17:30 EET

Boxscore

Trabzonspor	62–64	Hacettepe Üniversitesi

Anadolu University Sports Hall

October 10, 2011
20:00 EET

Boxscore

Banvit	73–75	Besiktas Milangaz

Anadolu University Sports Hall

October 11, 2011
17:30 EET

Boxscore

Hacettepe Üniversitesi	78–98	Besiktas Milangaz

Anadolu University Sports Hall

October 11, 2011
20:00 EET

Boxscore

Trabzonspor	71–72	Banvit

Anadolu University Sports Hall

=== Group B ===
Group B matches played in Erzurum.

Pos	Team	Pld	W	L	PF	PA	PD	Pts	Qualification
1	Fenerbahçe Ülker	3	3	0	253	199	+54	6	Advance to Final 8
2	Tofaş	3	1	2	223	238	−15	4	Advance to Final 8
3	Mersin BŞB	3	1	2	224	232	−8	4	
4	Olin Edirne	3	1	2	205	236	−31	4	

Source: Turkish Basketball Federation

October 6, 2011
17:30 EET

Boxscore

Tofaş	77–79	Olin Edirne

Cemal Gursel Gym

October 6, 2011
20:00 EET

Boxscore

Mersin BB	77–82	Fenerbahce Ulker

Cemal Gursel Gym

October 7, 2011
17:30 EET

Boxscore

Olin Edirne	69–76	Mersin BB

Cemal Gursel Gym

October 7, 2011
20:00 EET

Boxscore

Fenerbahce Ulker	88–65	Tofaş

Cemal Gursel Gym

October 8, 2011
15:30 EET

Boxscore

Tofaş	81–71	Mersin BB

Cemal Gursel Gym

October 8, 2011
18:00 EET

Boxscore

Fenerbahce Ulker	83–57	Olin Edirne

Cemal Gursel Gym

=== Group C ===
Group C matches played in İzmir.

Pos	Team	Pld	W	L	PF	PA	PD	Pts	Qualification
1	Aliağa Gençlik	3	2	1	220	223	−3	5	Advance to Final 8
2	Anadolu Efes	3	2	1	233	203	+30	5	Advance to Final 8
3	Türk Telekom	3	1	2	241	266	−25	4	
4	Pınar Karşıyaka	3	1	2	237	239	−2	4	

Source: Turkish Basketball Federation

October 9, 2011
15:30 EET

Boxscore

Pinar Karşiyaka	89–65	Aliağa Gençlik

Enka Sports Hall

October 9, 2011
18:00 EET

Boxscore

Turk Telekom	78–88	Anadolu Efes

Enka Sports Hall

October 10, 2011
15:30 EET

Boxscore

Anadolu Efes	90–65	Pinar Karşiyaka

Enka Sports Hall

October 10, 2011
18:00 EET

Boxscore

Aliağa Gençlik	95–79	Turk Telekom

Enka Sports Hall

October 11, 2011
15:30 EET

Boxscore

Pinar Karşiyaka	83–84	Turk Telekom

Enka Sports Hall

October 11, 2011
18:00 EET

Boxscore

Anadolu Efes	55–60	Aliağa Gençlik

Enka Sports Hall

=== Group D ===
Group D matches played in Samsun.

Pos	Team	Pld	W	L	PF	PA	PD	Pts	Qualification
1	Galatasaray	3	3	0	240	192	+48	6	Advance to Final 8
2	Antalya BB	3	1	2	256	268	−12	4	Advance to Final 8
3	Erdemir	3	1	2	232	234	−2	4	
4	Bandırma Kırmızı	3	1	2	205	239	−34	4	

Source: Turkish Basketball Federation

October 6, 2011
15:30 EET

Boxscore

Erdemir	73–60	Bandırma Kırmızı

Yasar East Sports Hall

October 6, 2011
18:00 EET

Boxscore

Antalya BB	67–89	Galatasaray

Yasar East Sports Hall

October 7, 2011
15:30 EET

Boxscore

Bandırma Kırmızı	85–83	Antalya BB

Yasar East Sports Hall

October 7, 2011
18:00 EET

Boxscore

Galatasaray	68–65	Erdemir

Yasar East Sports Hall

October 8, 2011
14:30 EET

Boxscore

Erdemir	94–106	Antalya BB

Yasar East Sports Hall

October 8, 2011
17:00 EET

Boxscore

Galatasaray	83–60	Bandırma Kırmızı

Yasar East Sports Hall

== Final 8 ==
The tournament finals were played among the top eight teams out of four groups, on 14–18 February 2012. Quarter-finals were played on 14-15 February 2012. Semi-finals are on 16 February 2012. Final match will be played on 18 February 2012.

== Finals bracket ==
Quarterfinals
Banvit	81
Tofaş	78
Anadolu Efes	82
Fenerbahçe Ülker	69
Beşiktaş Milangaz	87
Aliağa Petkim	82
Galatasaray M.P.	94
Antalya B.B.	57

Semifinals
Banvit	76
Anadolu Efes	67
Beşiktaş Milangaz	76
Galatasaray M.P.	69

Final
Banvit	74
Beşiktaş Milangaz	78
