= Thabo Sefolosha =

Swiss basketball player (born 1984)

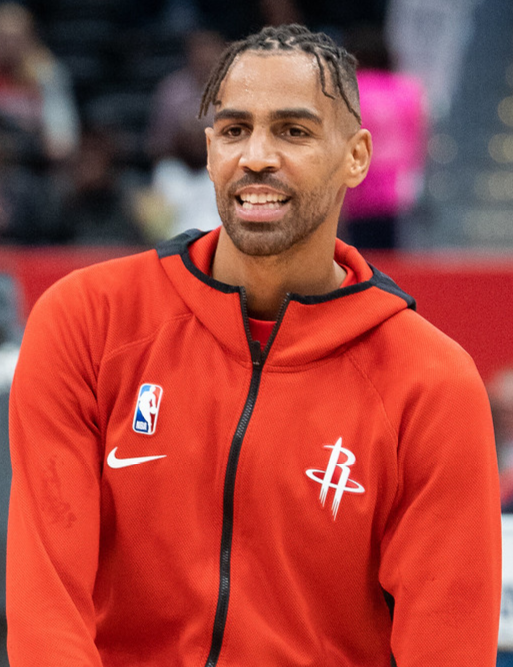
- Sefolosha with the Houston Rockets in 2019

Personal information
- Born: 2 May 1984 (age 42) Vevey, Switzerland
- Listed height: 6 ft 6 in (1.98 m)
- Listed weight: 215 lb (98 kg)

Career information
- NBA draft: 2006: 1st round, 13th overall pick
- Drafted by: Philadelphia 76ers
- Playing career: 2001–2023
- Position: Shooting guard / small forward
- Number: 2, 25, 22, 18

Career history
- 2001–2002: Tege Riviera
- 2002–2005: Élan Chalon
- 2005–2006: Angelico Biella
- 2006–2009: Chicago Bulls
- 2009–2014: Oklahoma City Thunder
- 2011: → Fenerbahçe Ülker
- 2014–2017: Atlanta Hawks
- 2017–2019: Utah Jazz
- 2019–2020: Houston Rockets
- 2023: Vevey Riviera Basket

Career highlights
- NBA All-Defensive Second Team (2010); French League All-Star (2005)

Career NBA statistics
- Points: 4,994 (5.7 ppg)
- Rebounds: 3,252 (3.7 rpg)
- Steals: 935 (1.1 spg)
- Stats at NBA.com
- Stats at Basketball Reference

Thabo Patrick Sefolosha (/ˈtɑːboʊ ˌsɛfəˈloʊʃə/; born 2 May 1984) is a Swiss former professional basketball player. He played in the National Basketball Association (NBA), the Turkish Basketball League, LNB Pro A, and Lega Basket Serie A. In 2006, Sefolosha became the first player from Switzerland to play in the NBA, and in 2013, he was labelled the best Swiss basketball player of all time by Swiss newspaper Freiburger Nachrichten.

== Early life ==
Sefolosha was born on 2 May 1984 in Vevey, Switzerland to Patrick Sefolosha, a South African musician, and Christine Sefolosha (née Beck), a Swiss artist. Sefolosha speaks French, Italian, and English.

== Professional career ==
=== Early years (2001–2006) ===
Sefolosha was invited to join the junior Swiss national basketball team, and at age 17, he began a professional career with Vevey Riviera Basket, in Switzerland's top domestic league. On a team trip to France, Sefolosha was approached by a French talent scout to play with Élan Chalon in the premier pro league in France.

Sefolosha spent his first year in Chalon-sur-Saône playing with the junior under-21 squad, which traveled alongside the senior club. The following year (2002–03), Sefolosha earned a rotation spot on the senior club, where he played 30 games and averaged 4.0 points, 3.5 rebounds and 1.0 assists per game.

The following season, Sefolosha earned a starting spot on the senior team, which he helped lead to a third-place finish in the French league and his team advanced to the playoffs semifinals. During the season, Sefolosha averaged 9.4 points, 7.0 rebounds, and 1.0 steal in 30.7 minutes per game.

Before the start of his fourth season with Élan Chalon, a contract dispute between Sefolosha and the team arose. Sefolosha's agent and the team president could not reach an agreement on a new contract, so Sefolosha signed with Italian team Angelico Biella. "Last summer, I had the chance to re-negotiate my contract with the club. We were supposed to reach an agreement, but when my agent and the president started talking, they couldn't agree on a contract. They wanted to keep me, but at the same time I had this offer from Italy. That's when I decided that the best thing for my career was to play in Biella. Yes, there was a little bit of trouble, but in the end it was OK."

=== Chicago Bulls (2006–2009) ===
Sefolosha was taken with the 13th pick of the 2006 NBA draft by the Philadelphia 76ers and promptly traded to the Chicago Bulls for the 16th pick (Rodney Carney), and cash considerations. In an article on Bulls.com, Sefolosha was quoted saying "I was certainly surprised (at the draft) when someone came up and said that I was the next to be picked. I thought maybe he had made a mistake or something. But a few minutes later he came back and told me that not only was I going to be picked, but that I was going to be traded to Chicago, which really got me excited."

Bulls head coach Scott Skiles cited that Sefolosha's wingspan and past pro basketball experience as reasons why the Bulls were interested in him. "Thabo's got great physical gifts that, frankly, a lot of guys in the league just don't have. He's got tremendous length and has really quick hands, he grabs your attention whenever you watch him play. It's easy to see that he knows what he's doing out there. You can tell he likes to play defense, too. He's eager to get after it."

After the NBA summer leagues finished, ESPN asked several NBA talent scouts and executives to rank the summer league players, and Sefolosha scored high. "He excelled at just about everything," reported one of the professionals. "Thabo Sefolosha showed that he's going to be able to step in right away and contribute to the Bulls."

=== Oklahoma City Thunder (2009–2014) ===
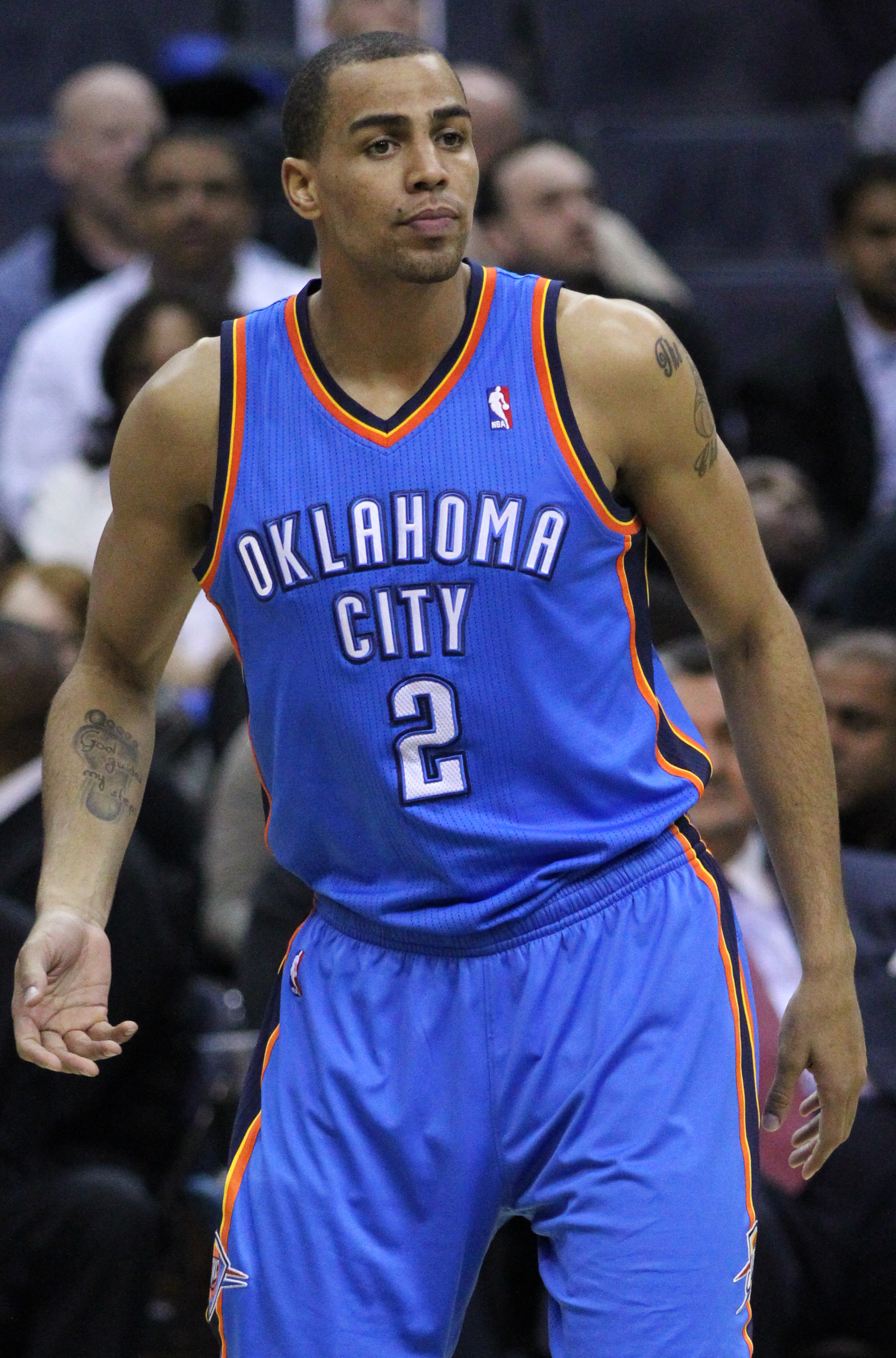
Sefolosha in 2011

On 19 February 2009, the trade deadline, Sefolosha was traded by the Bulls to the Oklahoma City Thunder for Denver's 2009 first-round draft pick, which Chicago used to draft Taj Gibson. Sefolosha was selected to the All-NBA Defensive Second Team for the 2009–10 NBA season.

In October 2011, during the 2011 NBA lockout, Sefolosha signed with Fenerbahçe Ülker in Turkey, but only for Euroleague matches. His deal had an out-clause that allowed him to return to Oklahoma City at the end of the lockout. He played seven games with Fenerbahçe Ülker during the 2011–12 Euroleague season.

In 2012, Sefolosha and the Thunder reached the NBA Finals, but were defeated by the Miami Heat in five games.

Sefolosha was a permanent member of the starting five, including in the Thunder's run to the finals. Starting as shooting guard, before James Harden (who came off the bench), Sefolosha received major playing time mainly due to his defensive abilities.

=== Atlanta Hawks (2014–2017) ===
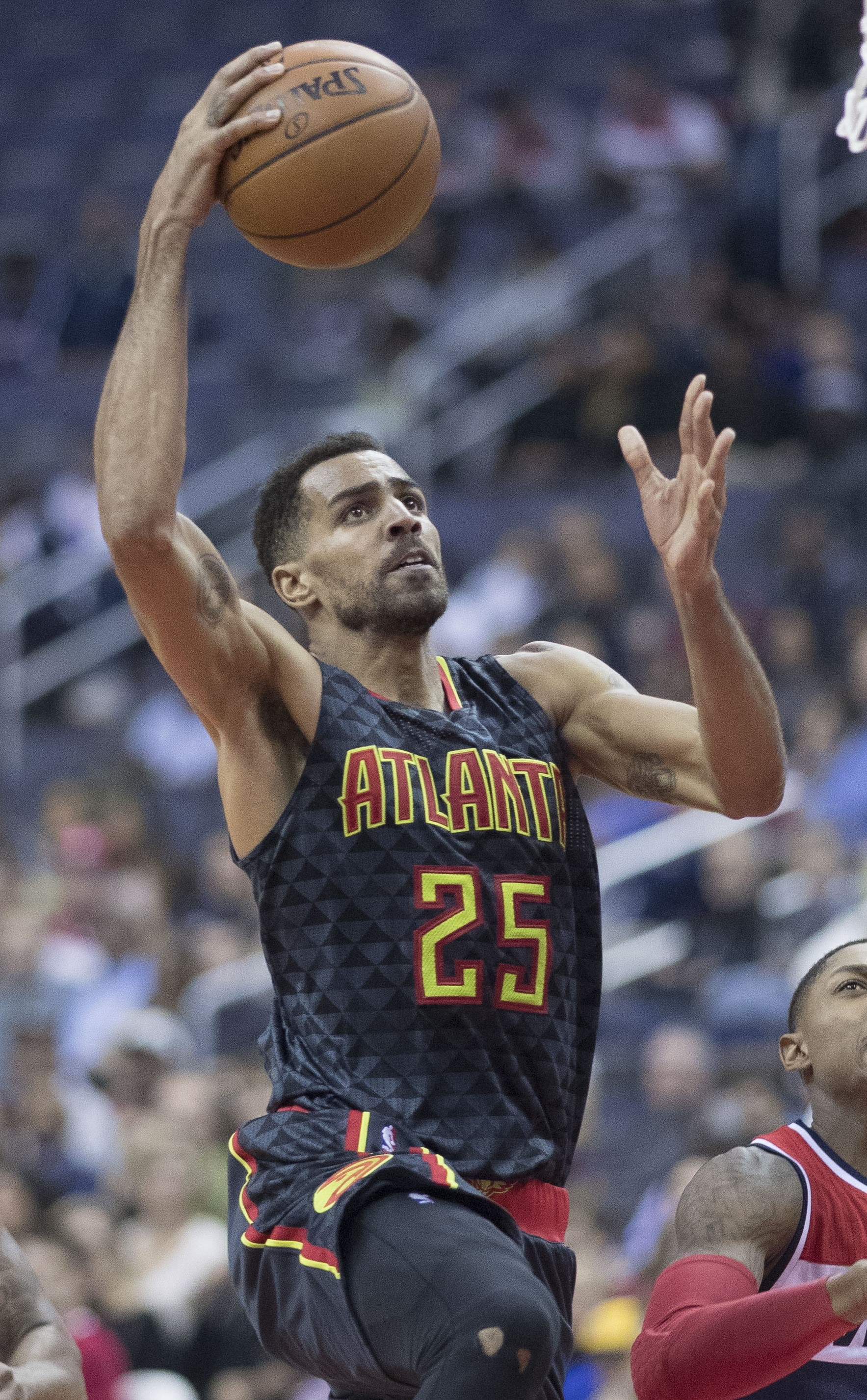
Sefolosha in 2016

On 15 July 2014, Sefolosha was acquired by the Atlanta Hawks in a sign-and-trade deal, along with rights to Giorgos Printezis, in exchange for the rights to Sofoklis Schortsanitis.

On 31 January 2015, Sefolosha was ruled out for six to eight weeks with a strained right calf. On April 9, he was ruled out for the rest of the regular season due to a fractured tibia suffered while being arrested by members of the New York City Police Department.

=== Utah Jazz (2017–2019) ===
On 18 July 2017, Sefolosha signed a multi-year deal with the Utah Jazz.

On 12 January 2018, in Utah's 99–88 loss to the Charlotte Hornets, Sefolosha suffered a right MCL injury. He underwent season-ending surgery five days later. On 3 April, Sefolosha was suspended without pay for five games for violating the terms of the NBA/NBPA Anti-Drug Program.

=== Houston Rockets (2019–2020) ===
On 23 September 2019, Sefolosha signed a one-year deal with the Houston Rockets.

=== Initial retirement ===
Sefolosha announced his retirement from professional basketball on 31 March 2021.

=== Vevey Riviera Basket (2023) ===
Despite announcing his retirement two years prior, Sefolosha signed with the Swiss team Vevey Riviera Basket on 26 January 2023, returning to the club where he first played professionally.

== Career statistics ==
Legend
GP	Games played	GS	Games started	MPG	Minutes per game
FG%	Field-goal percentage	3P%	3-point field-goal percentage	FT%	Free-throw percentage
RPG	Rebounds per game	APG	Assists per game	SPG	Steals per game
BPG	Blocks per game	PPG	Points per game	PIR	Performance index rating
**Bold**	Career high	*	Led the league

=== NBA ===
==== Regular season ====
Year	Team	GP	GS	MPG	FG%	3P%	FT%	RPG	APG	SPG	BPG	PPG
2006–07	Chicago	71	4	12.2	.426	.357	.511	2.2	.8	.5	.2	3.6
2007–08	Chicago	69	22	20.8	.428	.330	.721	3.7	1.9	.9	.4	6.7
2008–09	Chicago	43	14	17.1	.434	.300	.840	2.9	1.5	.8	.4	4.5
2008–09	Oklahoma City	23	22	**31.1**	.417	.243	.833	**5.2**	**2.0**	**1.7**	**1.1**	**8.5**
2009–10	Oklahoma City	**82***	**82***	28.6	.440	.313	.674	4.7	1.8	1.2	.6	6.0
2010–11	Oklahoma City	79	79	25.9	.471	.275	.747	4.4	1.4	1.2	.5	5.1
2011–12	Oklahoma City	42	42	21.8	.432	**.437**	**.884**	3.0	1.1	.9	.4	4.8
2012–13	Oklahoma City	81	81	27.5	.481	.419	.826	3.9	1.5	1.3	.5	7.6
2013–14	Oklahoma City	61	61	26.0	.415	.316	.768	3.6	1.5	1.3	.3	6.3
2014–15	Atlanta	52	7	18.8	.418	.321	.776	4.3	1.4	1.0	.4	5.3
2015–16	Atlanta	75	11	23.4	**.505**	.339	.626	4.5	1.4	1.1	.5	6.4
2016–17	Atlanta	62	42	25.7	.441	.342	.733	4.4	1.7	1.5	.5	7.2
2017–18	Utah	38	6	21.2	.492	.381	.815	4.2	0.9	1.4	.3	8.2
2018–19	Utah	50	2	12.2	.477	.436	.636	2.5	0.5	0.9	.1	3.8
2019–20	Houston	41	0	10.6	.407	.278	.375	2.3	0.6	0.6	.3	2.2
Career		869	475	21.9	.449	.349	.732	3.7	1.4	1.1	.4	5.7

==== Playoffs ====
Year	Team	GP	GS	MPG	FG%	3P%	FT%	RPG	APG	SPG	BPG	PPG
2007	Chicago	9	0	11.0	.385	**.375**	.583	1.9	.8	.2	.0	3.3
2010	Oklahoma City	6	6	21.2	.296	.231	.889	3.0	1.2	.8	**1.0**	4.5
2011	Oklahoma City	17	17	20.2	.463	.154	**1.000**	3.1	.7	.9	.3	4.6
2012	Oklahoma City	**20**	20	22.3	.402	.327	.889	2.7	1.3	**1.5**	.5	5.3
2013	Oklahoma City	11	11	**27.3**	.344	.316	.818	**4.5**	**2.1**	1.1	.5	5.7
2014	Oklahoma City	13	13	17.5	.415	.261	.800	2.1	.7	.8	.0	4.2
2016	Atlanta	10	2	20.3	**.478**	.368	.533	4.1	1.7	1.0	.6	**5.9**
2017	Atlanta	4	0	2.3	.000	-	.250	.0	.0	.0	.0	.3
2019	Utah	4	0	10.5	.143	.125	-	2.0	.5	.0	.0	1.3
Career		96	69	18.8	.396	.283	.744	2.8	1.1	.9	.3	4.4

=== Euroleague ===
Year	Team	GP	GS	MPG	FG%	3P%	FT%	RPG	APG	SPG	BPG	PPG	PIR
2011–12	Fenerbahçe	7	6	26.9	.529	.500	.633	6.0	.9	2.1	.4	11.4	14.3
Career		7	6	26.9	.529	.500	.633	6.0	.9	2.1	.4	11.4	14.3

== Personal life ==
On 8 April 2015, Sefolosha and teammate Pero Antić were arrested outside a nightclub in New York City for allegedly interfering with police after Chris Copeland of the Indiana Pacers was stabbed in the abdomen following an argument. During the altercation, the NYPD officers broke Sefolosha's right leg, shutting him down for the rest of the season. He underwent surgery on April 16, to repair a fractured tibia and ligament damage.

The prosecution offered Sefolosha a plea bargain, which would have involved a dismissal of the charges after six months, but Sefolosha refused it on 9 September 2015, even though his attorney, Alex Spiro, urged him to take it. Sefolosha said that he wanted to let the case proceed to trial instead; at the same time, charges against Antić were dropped. Sefolosha's court hearing was set on 5 October. Four days later, a Manhattan jury found him not guilty of all three misdemeanor charges: obstructing government administration, disorderly conduct and resisting arrest. On 21 October, Sefolosha announced that he would be suing the city of New York as well as eight police officers for up to $50 million in damages. On 9 April 2017, it was announced Sefolosha had settled with the NYPD for $4 million, a "substantial portion" of which he donated to Gideon's Promise, a nonprofit organization dedicated to educating public defenders.

In October 2017, Sefolosha revealed that he saved a woman the previous month from drowning while he and his family were on a rafting trip down the Provo River.

== See also ==
- List of European basketball players in the United States
