= List of NBA scoring leaders =

NBA scoring leader may refer to:

- List of NBA annual scoring leaders
- List of NBA career scoring leaders
- List of NBA career playoff scoring leaders
- List of NBA franchise career scoring leaders
- List of NBA rookie single-season scoring leaders
- List of NBA single-game scoring leaders
- List of NBA single-game playoff scoring leaders
- List of NBA single-season scoring leaders

== See also ==
- List of NBA annual 3-point scoring leaders
- List of NBA career 3-point scoring leaders
- List of NBA career playoff 3-point scoring leaders
