= Serhat Çetin =

Turkish basketball player (born 1986)

Aris Thessaloniki
- Title: Assistant coach
- League: Gr

Personal information
- Born: 23 February 1986 (age 40) Eminönü, Istanbul, Turkey
- Listed height: 6 ft 5.75 in (1.97 m)
- Listed weight: 208 lb (94 kg)

Career information
- NBA draft: 2008: undrafted
- Playing career: 2004–2020
- Positions: Small forward, shooting guard
- Number: 10, 15, 33

Career history

Playing
- 2004–2005: Tekelspor
- 2005–2006: Galatasaray Café Crown
- 2006–2007: Pınar Karşıyaka
- 2007–2008: Alpella
- 2008–2010: Fenerbahçe
- 2010–2013: Beşiktaş
- 2013–2014: Tofaş
- 2014–2015: Fenerbahçe
- 2015–2016: Darüşşafaka
- 2016–2019: Türk Telekom
- 2019–2020: CSO Voluntari

Coaching
- 2023: Beşiktaş (assistant)
- 2023–2024: Poland (assistant)
- 2024–2025: Manisa Basket (assistant)
- 2025-present: Aris Thessaloniki (assistant)

Career highlights
- Turkish League champion (2010); Turkish Cup MVP (2012); 2× Turkish Cup champion (2010, 2012)
Medals
Men's basketball
Representing Turkey
Mediterranean Games
Gold medal – first place	2013 Mersin	Team

Serhat Çetin (born 23 February 1986) is a Turkish professional basketball coach and former player. Standing at 6 ft 5.75 in (1.97 m), he mainly plays the small forward position but he also has the ability to play as a shooting guard position if needed. He was most recently the assistant coach for Aris Thessaloniki of the Greek Basketball League (SGBL) and of the EuroCup.

== Professional career ==
He started his professional career in Efes Pilsen. In 2004, he moved to Tekelspor. After a successful season, he signed a contract with Galatasaray Cafe Crown.

He signed with Pınar Karşıyaka in 2006. During 2006-07 season, he averaged 10.1 points, 2.9 rebounds, 2.6 assists and 1.1 steals in 30 games. With that performance, he drew the attention of Fenerbahçe.

Before the 2007-08 season, he was the third transfer of Fenerbahçe after Emir Preldžić and Gašper Vidmar. He spent three seasons there, usually being a role player.

He went to Beşiktaş Milangaz at the beginning of the 2010-11 season. The next year, he had already become an important part of the team. Led by coach Ergin Ataman, they won the 2011–12 Turkish Cup Basketball, beating Banvit B.K. and Çetin was named the Turkish Basketball Cup MVP for his performance. Beşiktaş went on winning the 2011–12 FIBA EuroChallenge in Debrecen. Beşiktaş also won the 2011–12 Turkish Basketball League, completing the treble.

After that legendary season, Beşiktaş dealt with financial problems and many star players departed. They brought their former player Erman Kunter as the new coach. Despite these dire conditions, Çetin decided to stay and helped the team win the Super Cup against Anadolu Efes. Before the 2013–14 season, he didn't renew his expired contract and went to Tofaş

On 8 July 2014, he signed a three-year contract with Fenerbahçe.

On 20 August 2015, he signed with Darüşşafaka for the 2015–16 season.

On 10 October 2016, he signed with Türk Telekom.

On 28 July 2019, he has signed with CSO Voluntari of the Liga Națională.

== Coaching career ==
Following retirement, he has started his coaching career by becoming assistant coach for Beşiktaş of the Turkish Basketbol Süper Ligi (BSL).

On August 1, 2023, he signed and became assistant coach for Poland during 2024 FIBA Men's Pre-Qualifying Olympic Qualifying Tournaments.
