= Roko Ukić =

Croatian basketball player (born 1984)

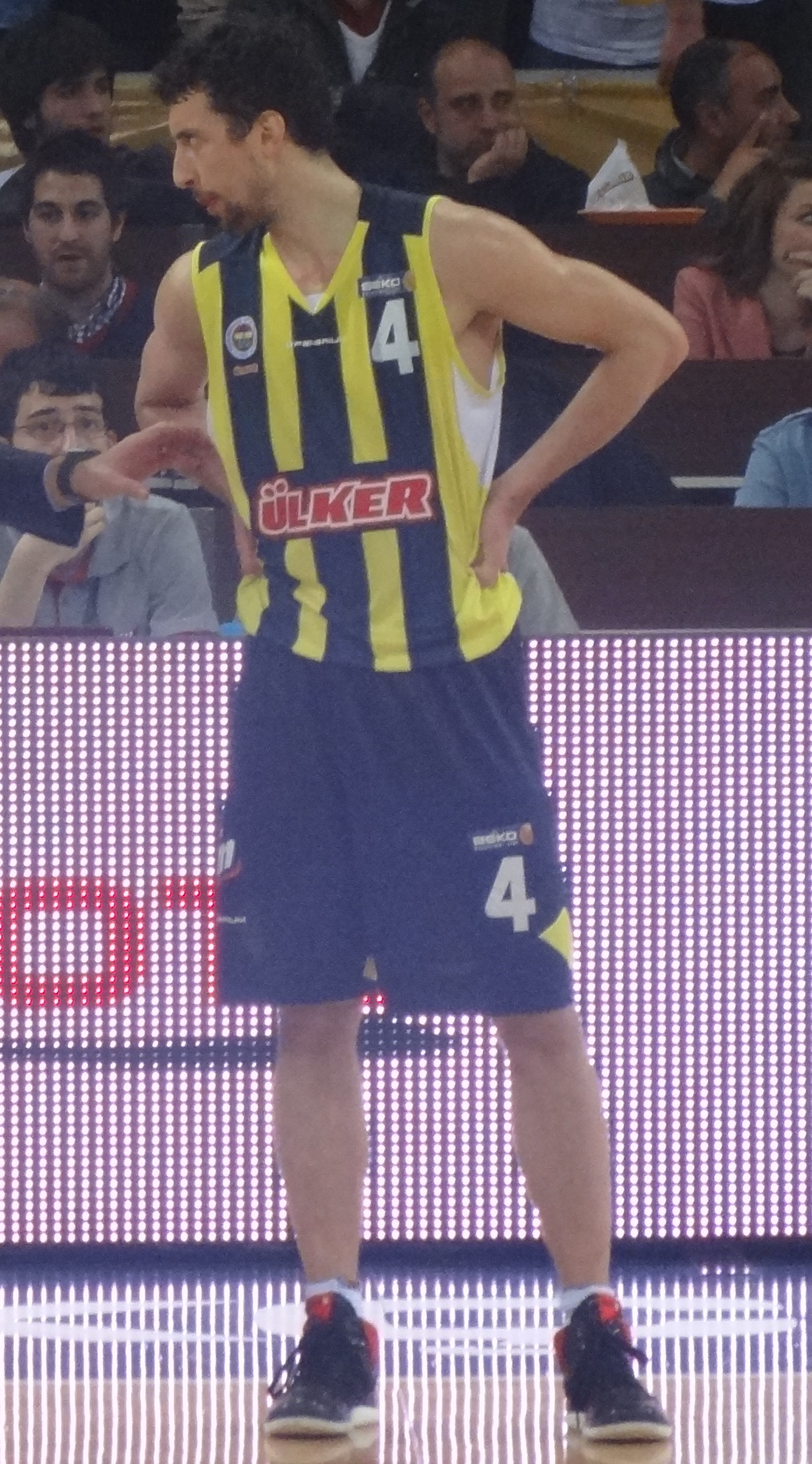
- Ukić with Fenerbahçe in 2012

Personal information
- Born: December 5, 1984 (age 41) Split, SR Croatia, SFR Yugoslavia
- Listed height: 6 ft 5 in (1.96 m)
- Listed weight: 190 lb (86 kg)

Career information
- NBA draft: 2005: 2nd round, 41st overall pick
- Drafted by: Toronto Raptors
- Playing career: 2000–2023
- Position: Point guard / shooting guard
- Number: 1, 20, 4

Career history
- 2000–2005: Split
- 2005–2006: Tau Cerámica
- 2006–2007: FC Barcelona
- 2007–2008: Lottomatica Roma
- 2008–2009: Toronto Raptors
- 2009–2010: Milwaukee Bucks
- 2010–2012: Fenerbahçe
- 2012–2014: Panathinaikos
- 2014–2015: Cedevita
- 2015–2016: Varese
- 2016: Cantù
- 2016–2017: AEK Athens
- 2017–2018: Cedevita
- 2018–2019: Levallois Metropolitans
- 2019–2020: Antibes Sharks
- 2020–2021: Cedevita Olimpija
- 2021–2023: Split

Career highlights
- 3× Croatian League champion (2003, 2015, 2018); 2× Turkish League champion (2010, 2011); 2× Greek League champion (2013, 2014); 3× Croatian Cup winner (2004, 2015, 2018); 2× Spanish Cup winner (2006, 2007); 2× Turkish Cup winner (2010, 2011); 2× Greek Cup winner (2013, 2014); Slovenian Supercup winner (2020); ABA League Supercup winner (2017); Greek League Finals MVP (2013); Greek Cup Finals MVP (2013)
- Stats at NBA.com
- Stats at Basketball Reference
Medals
Men's basketball
Representing Croatia
European U-18 Championship
Gold medal – first place	2002 Germany	U-18 Team

Roko Leni Ukić (born December 5, 1984) is a Croatian former professional basketball player. Standing at 6 ft 5 in (1.96 m), he mainly played at the point guard position, but could also play at the shooting guard position.

== Professional career ==
Ukić was born and raised in Split, where he began playing basketball for the youth clubs of KK Split in 1992. He competed on cadet and junior teams for the club, winning the national youth championship twice with the cadet team, and earning the MVP award of the Croatian cadet championship in 2000. Ukić joined the club's senior team in 2000, at age 16. He scored his first professional points on October 14, 2000, as his Split team won the game against Šibenik (93–79). Ukić finished the game with five points.

At age 17, Ukić was already the team's captain. During his five years with the club, he won the Croatian League championship in 2003, and the Croatian Cup in 2004. In the Croatian Cup final against Zadar, Ukić scored the winning buzzer beater. Ukić played for Split until 2005, when he was drafted by the Toronto Raptors of the National Basketball Association (NBA) in the second round, with the 41st pick overall, after averaging 18.5 points and 4.3 assists, in 35.2 minutes per game, for Split in the ABA League.

Rather than risk being buried on the bench as a reserve player in the NBA, Ukić opted to join Tau Cerámica of the Spanish ACB League, a team that had an open spot at the backup point guard position in 2005. In his first season in a foreign league, Ukić became the first Croatian player to win the Spanish ACB League's Player of the Week award. He got the award after scoring 27 points against CB Valladolid. Ukić won the Spanish Cup 2006, and played in the Spanish ACB League Playoffs, where his team eventually lost to Unicaja Malaga in the finals, by a 3–0 series score.

After spending a season with Baskonia, he moved to the Spanish League rivals, FC Barcelona, in the summer of 2006, where he also held the backup position at point guard. With Ukić in the line-up, Barcelona won the 2007 Spanish Cup, but lost the 2007 Spanish League Finals versus Real Madrid, by a 3–1 series result.

In the summer of 2007, he moved to the Italian Lega Basket Serie A team Virtus Roma, on a loan deal, where he was coached by his mentor and Croatian national team head coach, Jasmin Repeša. Ukić had his best EuroLeague season with Virtus, averaging 12.7 points and 2.8 assists per game. He reached the Italian League's national championship finals, and once again his team was only second best. Montepaschi Siena won the finals by a 4–1 series result.

On July 16, 2008, Ukić agreed to a three-year deal with the Toronto Raptors. During his first NBA season, he appeared in 72 games, as a backup at point guard to his former Saski Baskonia teammate, José Calderón, wearing jersey #1 for the Raptors. In 12.4 minutes of play, he averaged 4.2 points and 2.1 assists, with career highs of 22 points on February 22, 2009, against the San Antonio Spurs, and 10 assists on March 27, 2009, against the Oklahoma City Thunder.

On August 18, 2009, Ukić was traded to the Milwaukee Bucks, along with Carlos Delfino, in exchange for Amir Johnson and Sonny Weems. On January 4, 2010, he was waived by the Bucks, at his own request, because he was not satisfied with his role on the team.

After being waived by the Bucks during his second NBA season, in January 2010, Ukić returned to Europe, when he moved to the Turkish League team Fenerbahçe Ülker. He signed a two-year contract on June 17, 2010.

Ukić led his club to the 2009–10 Turkish Basketball League title, by hitting the game-winning shot in Game 3 of the league's finals and scoring 15 points in Game 6 win by a score of 76–51. The club had also previously won the Turkish Cup, with Ukić scoring 11 points in the Cup's final game versus Mersin BB.

In the 2010–11 season, Fenerbahçe repeated in winning the Turkish double. Ukić was voted the MVP of the Turkish League Playoffs. Fenerbahçe also reached the Top 16 phase of the EuroLeague, with Ukić posting averages of 13.2 points, 3.5 assists, and 2.5 rebounds per game. His final season with the Turkish club was injury plagued.

Ukić missed the start of the 2011–12 season, due to a stress fracture in his foot, and later on in the season, he suffered a broken finger.

In 2012, Ukić signed a two-year contract with the Greek League club Panathinaikos. In his first season with the club, he won the third double of his career. In the final of the Greek Cup, Panathinaikos beat Olympiacos 81–78, as Ukić scored 18 points, and won the Final MVP award.

Panathinaikos and Olympiacos played again in the Greek League finals, and Panathinaikos claimed the title, with a 3–0 series sweep. Ukić was the leading scorer of the finals. In Game 2, he scored 17 points in 23 minutes on the court, helping his team to a 63–52 victory.

Ukić played in 28 EuroLeague games in the 2012–13 season, averaging 8.9 points, 2.8 assists, and 2.7 rebounds per game. He won the Player of the Round award for his performance in Round 8 of the Top 16. Panathinaikos won away at BC Žalgiris, 78–73, with Ukić contributing 21 points, six assists, four rebounds, and a performance index rating of 28. After the game, Ukić said he had felt back pain, and had thrown up on the Panathinaikos bench in the final minutes of the game.

Ukić missed the beginning of the 2013–14 season, because of Achilles tendon strains in both feet. On August 7, 2014, Ukić returned to Croatia, signing a one-year deal with Cedevita.

On October 9, 2015, Ukić signed a two-month contract with Italian club Pallacanestro Varese. Following the expiration of his contract, on December 16, 2015, he parted ways with Varese. On January 11, 2016, he signed with Pallacanestro Cantù for the rest of the season.

On September 1, 2016, Ukić signed with Greek club AEK Athens for the 2016–17 season.

On July 22, 2017, Ukić returned to Cedevita, signing a two-year deal. He left club in July 2018. On August 2, 2018, Ukić signed a one-year deal with French Pro A club Levallois Metropolitans. On July 31, 2019, he had signed with Antibes Sharks of the Pro B.

On July 16, 2020, Ukić signed with Cedevita Olimpija.

On January 5, 2021, he has signed with Split of the Croatian League and the ABA League. After the end of the 2021–22 season, Ukić was not active for a while. He rejoined Split in December 2022, agreeing to play until the end of the 2022–23 season for free.

In February, 2024, Ukić officially announced his retirement from playing basketball professionally.

== National team career ==
Ukić is a former member of the Croatian junior national teams, earning with them a gold medal at the 2002 FIBA Europe Under-18 Championship, and he also played with Croatia's junior national team at the 2003 FIBA Under-19 World Championship held in Greece, averaging 19.8 points, 4.6 rebounds, 4.4 assists, and 2.6 steals per game, as his team reached the tournament's semifinals.

He has also been a member of the senior Croatian men's national team. Some of the tournament's he had played in with Croatia's senior national team include: EuroBasket 2005, EuroBasket 2007, 2008 Summer Olympics, EuroBasket 2009, 2010 FIBA World Championship, and EuroBasket 2013. Since 2010, Ukić has been the Croatian national team's captain. With 1,471 points scored (as of September 2014), he is third in the list of all-time top scorers for the Croatian national team.

He also represented Croatia at EuroBasket 2015, where they were eliminated in the eighth finals by the Czech Republic. He also played at the 2016 Summer Olympics, and at EuroBasket 2017.

== Personal life ==
Roko's father is Zoran Ukić, drummer of Daleka Obala. Roko Leni Ukić got his first name after his grandfather, and his middle name after drummer Lenny White.

Roko also plays the drums. In the summer of 2023, Roko's band Stereotrip, released their first album titled "Mimo svijeta". In 2025 he and his band released their second album titled "Divlje zvijeri" under the Croatia Records label.

Ukić is married to his wife Tamara (b. 1985), and he has a daughter, Sara, born October 20, 2007, in Rome. He also has a son, Luka.

== Career statistics ==
Legend
GP	Games played	GS	Games started	MPG	Minutes per game
FG%	Field-goal percentage	3P%	3-point field-goal percentage	FT%	Free-throw percentage
RPG	Rebounds per game	APG	Assists per game	SPG	Steals per game
BPG	Blocks per game	PPG	Points per game	PIR	Performance index rating
**Bold**	Career high

=== NBA ===
==== Regular season ====
Year	Team	GP	GS	MPG	FG%	3P%	FT%	RPG	APG	SPG	BPG	PPG
2008–09	Toronto	**72**	0	**12.4**	.380	.177	.733	**1.0**	**2.1**	**.4**	.0	**4.2**
2009–10	Milwaukee	13	0	7.5	**.467**	**.250**	**.818**	.2	.9	.1	.0	3.1
Career		85	0	11.6	.387	.189	.746	.9	1.9	.4	.0	4.0

=== EuroLeague ===
Year	Team	GP	GS	MPG	FG%	3P%	FT%	RPG	APG	SPG	BPG	PPG	PIR
2005–06	Tau Cerámica	17	3	14.6	.322	.189	.706	1.3	1.9	.4	.1	4.4	3.2
2006–07	Barcelona	23	4	16.1	.387	.350	.630	1.3	2.0	.4	.0	5.1	5.2
2007–08	Lottomatica	19	15	**29.5**	.470	.351	.824	2.4	2.8	**1.1**	**.3**	12.7	11.4
2009–10	Fenerbahçe	1	1	28.8	**.500**	.333	**1.000**	**6.0**	4.0	.0	.0	**20.0**	**21.0**
2010–11	Fenerbahçe	14	14	27.9	.483	**.419**	.818	2.5	3.5	.9	.1	13.2	13.4
2011–12	Fenerbahçe	15	15	28.0	.401	.293	.725	2.8	2.1	.6	.0	11.1	7.9
2012–13	Panathinaikos	28	23	27.0	.398	.306	.639	2.7	2.8	.5	.1	8.9	8.8
2013–14	Panathinaikos	**29**	**27**	22.4	.346	.246	.720	1.5	2.4	.6	.1	6.3	4.0
2014–15	Cedevita	8	4	22.4	.368	.281	.842	2.0	**4.9**	.4	.0	10.1	10.3
Career		154	106	23.3	.404	.308	.727	2.1	2.6	.6	.1	8.6	7.6
