= Marko Tomas =

Croatian basketball player (born 1985)

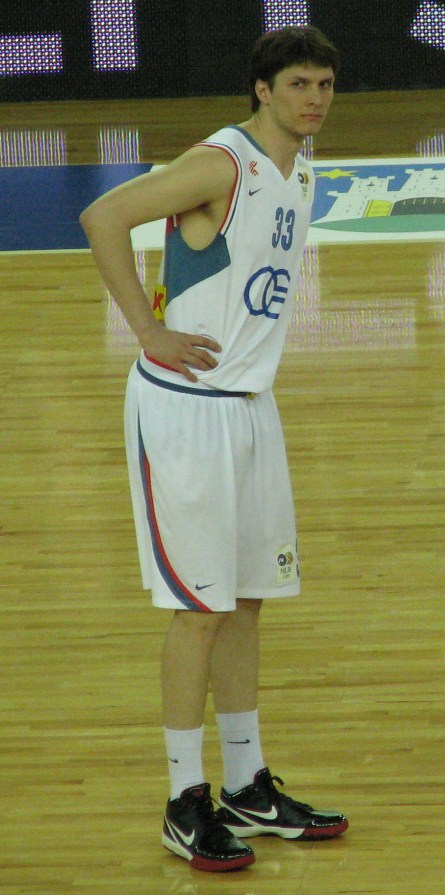
- Tomas playing for Cibona in 2010

Personal information
- Born: 3 January 1985 (age 41) Koprivnica, SR Croatia, SFR Yugoslavia
- Listed height: 6 ft 7 in (2.01 m)
- Listed weight: 215 lb (98 kg)

Career information
- NBA draft: 2007: undrafted
- Playing career: 2001–2021
- Position: Shooting guard / small forward

Career history
- 2001–2005: Zagreb
- 2005–2007: Real Madrid
- 2007–2008: Fuenlabrada
- 2008–2009: Real Madrid
- 2009–2010: Cibona
- 2010–2012: Fenerbahçe
- 2012–2015: Cedevita
- 2015–2016: TED Ankara Kolejliler
- 2016–2017: Cedevita
- 2017–2018: Cibona
- 2018: Zabok
- 2018–2019: Gaziantep
- 2019–2020: Igokea
- 2020–2021: Gaziantep

Career highlights
- ULEB Cup champion (2007); Spanish League champion (2007); 4× Croatian League champion (2010, 2014, 2015, 2017); Turkish League champion (2011); Turkish Cup winner (2011); 3× Croatian Cup winner (2014, 2015, 2017); 3× Torneo Comunidad de Madrid champion (2005, 2006, 2008)
Medals
Men's basketball
Representing Croatia
European U-18 Championship
Gold medal – first place	2002 Germany	U-18 Team

Marko Tomas (born 3 January 1985) is a retired Croatian professional basketball player. He represented the Croatian national basketball team internationally. Standing at 6 ft 7 in (2.01 m), he played at the shooting guard and small forward positions.

== Professional career ==
In 2007, Tomas won the Spanish League and ULEB Cup championships with Real Madrid. He was then sent to Fuenlabrada on loan to gain experience in the 2007–08 season. On 18 September 2009 he was waived by Real.

On 20 September 2009 he signed a one-year deal with Cibona.

On 23 June 2010 he signed a two-year deal with Fenerbahçe Ülker.

On 7 August 2012 Tomas signed a one-year contract with the Croatian team Cedevita. On 24 July 2013 he re-signed with Cedevita for two more seasons.

On 30 July 2015 he signed with Turkish club TED Ankara Kolejliler for the 2015–16 BSL season.

On 29 October 2016 Tomas returned to Cedevita for the rest of the 2016–17 season.

On 3 October 2017 he signed an open contract with his former club Cibona.

In October 2018 he joined another Croatian club: this time the less ambitious Zabok that was coached by his brother Ivan. After playing just two games for Zabok he moved to Gaziantep of the Turkish Super League.

On 8 August 2020 he signed with Gaziantep Basketbol of the Turkish Basketbol Süper Ligi (BSL).

== Career statistics ==
Legend
GP	Games played	GS	Games started	MPG	Minutes per game
FG%	Field-goal percentage	3P%	3-point field-goal percentage	FT%	Free-throw percentage
RPG	Rebounds per game	APG	Assists per game	SPG	Steals per game
BPG	Blocks per game	PPG	Points per game	PIR	Performance index rating
**Bold**	Career high

=== Euroleague ===
Year	Team	GP	GS	MPG	FG%	3P%	FT%	RPG	APG	SPG	BPG	PPG	PIR
2005–06	Real Madrid	15	6	23.4	.413	.410	.833	2.1	1.8	.9	.0	6.5	5.2
2008–09	Real Madrid	**17**	3	13.3	**.439**	.313	**.846**	1.7	.6	.6	.1	5.3	5.2
2009–10	Cibona	16	**16**	**34.2**	.389	.330	.809	**3.1**	**1.9**	**1.1**	**.3**	**16.4**	**14.3**
2010–11	Fenerbahçe	15	14	22.7	.402	**.418**	.676	**3.1**	1.3	.7	.0	8.5	6.7
2011–12	Fenerbahçe	6	3	16.4	.280	.286	.750	1.7	.3	.8	.0	3.5	1.0
2012–13	Cedevita	4	0	15.8	.250	.222	.778	2.0	.3	.3	.0	4.3	1.8
2014–15	Cedevita	1	0	25.3	.222	.200	.000	4.0	.0	1.0	.0	5.0	3.0
Career		74	42	22.3	.389	.350	.790	2.4	1.2	.8	.1	8.5	7.0

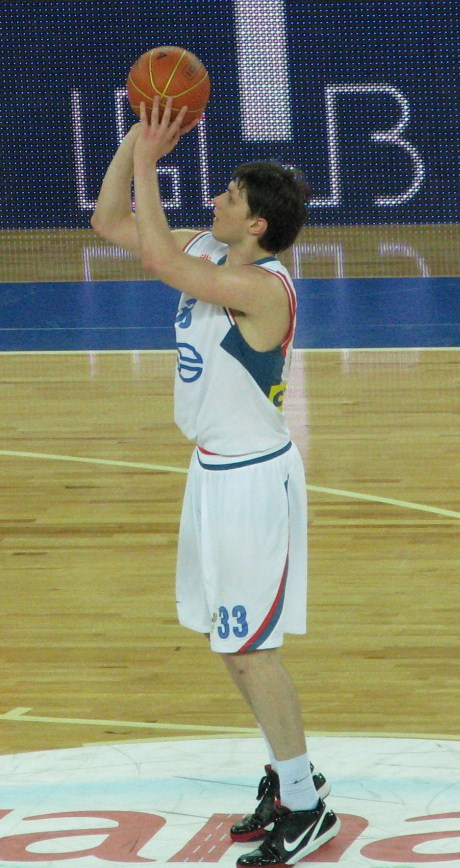
Marko Tomas (2010.)

== Croatian national team ==
Tomas won the gold medal with the junior Croatian national basketball team at the European Junior Championship in 2002. He debuted for the senior Croatian national basketball team at the EuroBasket 2005. He later played at the EuroBasket 2007, EuroBasket 2011, EuroBasket 2015 and EuroBasket 2017. He also represented Croatia at the 2008 Olympic Games and the 2010 FIBA World Championship.

=== Personal life ===
Marko's older brother Ivan (born 1981) and younger brother Luka (born 1999) are both professionally tied to basketball. Ivan is a coach and former player while Luka is a player.
