= Ömer Onan =

Turkish basketball player (born 1978)

- Onan in 2026

Fenerbahçe
- Title: Board member

Personal information
- Born: February 4, 1978 (age 48) Mersin, Turkey
- Listed height: 6 ft 4.5 in (1.94 m)
- Listed weight: 210 lb (95 kg)

Career information
- NBA draft: 2000: undrafted
- Playing career: 1995–2014
- Position: Shooting guard
- Number: 7, 6, 15

Career history
- 1995–2004: Efes Pilsen
- 2004–2005: Fenerbahçe
- 2005–2006: Ülkerspor
- 2006–2014: Fenerbahçe

Career highlights
- As player: FIBA Korać Cup champion (1996); 11× Turkish Super League champion (1996, 1997, 2002–2004, 2006–2008, 2010, 2011, 2014); 8× Turkish Cup winner (1996–1998, 2001, 2002, 2010, 2011, 2013); 5× Turkish SuperCup winner (1996, 1998, 2000, 2006, 2013); 2x Turkish Basketball All-Star Game (2005, 2008); No. 7 retired by Fenerbahçe (2014)
Medals
Men's basketball
Representing Turkey
EuroBasket
Silver medal – second place	2001 Turkey	National team
FIBA World Cup
Silver medal – second place	2010 Turkey	National team

Ömer Onan (born February 4, 1978) is a Turkish former professional basketball player. Standing 1.94 m (6 ft 4 ½ in) and weighing 95.4 kg (210 lbs.), he played as a shooting guard.

== Playing career ==
=== Pro clubs ===
During his professional playing career, Onan won the European-wide third-tier level league, the FIBA Korać Cup championship in 1996. Domestically in his native Turkey, he also won the Turkish Super League championship 11 times (1996, 1997, 2002, 2003, 2004, 2006, 2007, 2008, 2010, 2011, and 2014). In addition to that, he won the Turkish Cup title 8 times (1996, 1997, 1998, 2001, 2002, 2010, 2011, and 2013); and the Turkish Super Cup title 5 times (1996, 1998, 2000, 2006, 2013).

His number 7 jersey was retired by Fenerbahçe in 2014.

=== Turkish national team ===
Onan was a member of the senior men's Turkish national team. He was a part of the Turkish teams that won the silver medal at the EuroBasket 2001 and the 2010 FIBA World Championship.

== Post-playing career ==
In August 2014, Onan retired from playing professional basketball, and became a team manager of his longtime playing club, Fenerbahçe, replacing Mirsad Türkcan at that position.
