= 2010–11 Turkish Basketball Cup =

Turkish Cup Basketball 2010–11
- League: Turkish Basketball Men Cup
- Sport: Basketball
- Teams: 16

Final
- Champions: Fenerbahçe Ülker
- Runners-up: Beşiktaş Cola Turka
- Finals MVP: (Turkey) Emir Preldžič

Turkish Basketball Men Cup seasons
- ← 2009–10 2011–12 →

Spor Toto Turkish Cup 2010–11 season was the 26th season of the TBF Men's Turkish Cup. Fenerbahçe Ülker won the cup this season, after it beat Beşiktaş Cola Turka 72–81 in the Final.

== Group stage ==
Group A and D matches played 10–12 October, group B and C matches played 9–11 October 2010.

=== Group A ===
Group A matches played in Balıkesir.

Pos	Team	Pld	W	L	PF	PA	PD	Pts	Qualification
1	Aliağa Petkim	3	3	0	240	206	+34	6	Advance to Final 8
2	Banvit	3	1	2	237	216	+21	4	Advance to Final 8
3	Mersin BB	3	1	2	223	234	−11	4	
4	Erdemir	3	1	2	197	241	−44	4	

Source: Turkish Basketball Federation

Mersin BB	77 - 80	Aliağa Petkim
Erdemir	59 - 92	Banvit
Banvit	79 - 83	Mersin BB
Aliağa Petkim	86 - 63	Erdemir
Mersin BB	63 - 75	Erdemir
Banvit	66 - 74	Aliağa Petkim

=== Group B ===
Group B matches played in Ordu.

Pos	Team	Pld	W	L	PF	PA	PD	Pts	Qualification
1	Efes Pilsen	3	3	0	243	193	+50	6	Advance to Final 8
2	Olin Edirne	3	2	1	201	196	+5	5	Advance to Final 8
3	Pınar Karşıyaka	3	1	2	223	229	−6	4	
4	Antalya BB	3	0	3	200	249	−49	3	

Source: Turkish Basketball Federation

Pınar Karşıyaka	81 - 74	Antalya BB
Olin Edirne	58 - 63	Efes Pilsen
Efes Pilsen	60 - 49	Pınar Karşıyaka
Antalya BB	62 - 67	Olin Edirne
Pınar Karşıyaka	63 - 75	Olin Edirne
Efes Pilsen	101 - 64	Antalya BB

=== Group C ===
Group C matches played in Gaziantep.

Pos	Team	Pld	W	L	PF	PA	PD	Pts	Qualification
1	Fenerbahçe Ülker	3	3	0	244	177	+67	6	Advance to Final 8
2	Medical Park Trabzonspor	3	1	2	205	228	−23	4	Advance to Final 8
3	Tofaş	3	1	2	220	226	−6	4	
4	Bornova Belediyespor	3	1	2	202	240	−38	4	

Source: Turkish Basketball Federation

Fenerbahçe Ülker	80 - 57	Bornova Belediye
Tofaş	76 - 69	MP Trabzonspor
MP Trabzonspor	42 - 81	Fenerbahçe Ülker
Bornova Belediye	74 - 66	Tofaş
Fenerbahçe Ülker	83 - 78	Tofaş
MP Trabzonspor	94 - 71	Bornova Belediye

=== Group D ===
Group D matches played in Antalya.

Pos	Team	Pld	W	L	PF	PA	PD	Pts	Qualification
1	Beşiktaş Cola Turka	3	3	0	269	238	+31	6	Advance to Final 8
2	Galatasaray Café Crown	3	2	1	229	197	+32	5	Advance to Final 8
3	Türk Telekom	3	1	2	210	235	−25	4	
4	Oyak Renault	3	0	3	207	245	−38	3	

Source: Turkish Basketball Federation

Türk Telekom	79 - 67	Oyak Renault
Galatasaray CC	80 - 89	Beşiktaş CT
Oyak Renault	47 - 70	Galatasaray CC
Beşiktaş CT	84 - 70	Türk Telekom
Galatasaray CC	79 - 61	Türk Telekom
Oyak Renault	88 - 96	Beşiktaş CT

== Final 8 ==
All matches playing Eastern European Time.

Quarter-finals
February 09, 18.00
Beşiktaş Cola Turka	57
Efes Pilsen	55
February 09, 20.30
M. Park Trabzonspor	72
Aliağa Petkim	62
February 10, 18.00
Galatasaray Café Crown	62
Olin Edirne	55
February 10, 20.30
Fenerbahçe Ülker	69
Banvit	68

Semi-finals
February 11, 18.00
Beşiktaş Cola Turka	90
M. Park Trabzonspor	88
February 11, 20.30
Galatasaray Café Crown	70
Fenerbahçe Ülker	77

Final
February 13, 15.00
Beşiktaş Cola Turka	72
Fenerbahçe Ülker	81

=== Final ===
February 13, 2011
15.00

Report

Beşiktaş Cola Turka	72–81	Fenerbahçe Ülker
Scoring by quarter: 19-20, 18-17, 14-21, 21-23
Pts: Ogilvy 24; Rebs: Ogilvy 14; Asts: Serkan 7		Pts: Preldžič 35; Rebs: Kaya 9 Asts: Preldžič 4

Kadir Has Spor Salonu, Kayseri
Referees: Engin Kennerman, Recep Ankaralı, Serkan Emlek
MVP: Emir Preldžič

2010–11 Turkish Cup Champion:
Fenerbahçe Ülker
