= 2003–04 Turkish Basketball League =

Basketball league in Turkey

Turkish Basketball League
- Season: 2003–04

Finals
- Champions: Efes Pilsen (11th title)
- Runners-up: Ülker
- Semifinalists: Pınar Karşıyaka, Beşiktaş

Statistical leaders
Points	Marc Salyers	25.3
Rebounds	Stéphane Pelle	11.1
Assists	Khalid El-Amin	6.3

The 2003–04 Turkish Basketball League was the 38th season of the top-tier professional basketball league in Turkey. The season started on October 10, 2003. Efes Pilsen won their eleventh national championship this season.

== Regular season ==
=== League table ===
Pos	Team	Pld	W	L	Qualification or relegation
1	Ülker	26	22	4	Qualification to quarterfinals
2	Efes Pilsen	26	21	5	Qualification to quarterfinals
3	Beşiktaş	26	20	6	Qualification to quarterfinals
4	Pınar Karşıyaka	26	16	10	Qualification to quarterfinals
5	Tuborg Pilsener	26	16	10	Qualification to quarterfinals
6	Darüşşafaka	26	14	12	Qualification to quarterfinals
7	Türk Telekom	26	13	13	Qualification to first round
8	Tekelspor	26	12	14	Qualification to first round
9	Aras İTÜ	26	11	15	Qualification to first round
10	Fenerbahçe	26	9	17	Qualification to first round
11	Büyük Kolej	26	9	17	
12	Galatasaray	26	8	18	
13	Oyak Renault	26	7	19	Relegated to Turkish First League
14	Tofaş	26	4	22	Relegated to Turkish First League

Source: TBLStat.net
- Oyak Renault and Tofaş have been relegated from the Turkish Basketball First League.
  Banvit and Erdemirspor won promotion from the second league and played the 2004–05 season in the Turkish Basketball First League.

== Turkish Basketball League 2003–04 play-offs ==
as of June 30, 2004

The 2004 Turkish Basketball League play-offs is the final phase of the 2003–04 regular season.

First round, Quarterfinal and Semifinal series are 5-match series. The teams reaches the first 3 wins is through to the next round. The team which has won both regular season match-ups starts with a 1–0 lead to the series. If teams split up the regular season meetings, series starts with a 1–1 draw.

Final series are 7-match series and the team reaches first 4 wins is the champion of the Turkish Basketball League.

1.Round
8	Tekelspor	3
9	Aras İTÜ	2
7	Türk Telekom	2
10	Fenerbahçe	3

Quarter Finals
1	Efes Pilsen	3
8	Tekelspor	0
4	Pınar Karşıyaka	3
5	Tuborg Pilsener	2
2	Ülkerspor	3
10	Fenerbahçe	0
3	Beşiktaş	3
6	Darüşşafaka	2

Semi-Finals
1	Efes Pilsen	3
4	Pınar Karşıyaka	1
2	Ülkerspor	3
3	Beşiktaş	1

Finals
1	Efes Pilsen	4
2	Ülkerspor	2
