= 2002–03 Turkish Basketball League =

Basketball league in Turkey

Turkish Basketball League
- Season: 2002–03

Finals
- Champions: Efes Pilsen (10th title)
- Runners-up: Ülker
- Semifinalists: Galatasaray, Türk Telekom

Statistical leaders
Points	Dewayne Jefferson	23.4
Rebounds	Gary Sankes	12.2
Assists	Mark Dickel	5.7

The 2002–03 Turkish Basketball League was the 37th season of the top-tier professional basketball league in Turkey. The season started on October 4, 2002. Efes Pilsen won their tenth national championship this season.

== Regular season ==
=== League table ===
Pos	Team	Pld	W	L	Qualification or relegation
1	Ülker	26	25	1	Qualification to quarterfinals
2	Efes Pilsen	26	24	2	Qualification to quarterfinals
3	Galatasaray	26	16	10	Qualification to quarterfinals
4	Türk Telekom	26	15	11	Qualification to quarterfinals
5	Pınar Karşıyaka	26	15	11	Qualification to quarterfinals
6	Fenerbahçe	26	14	12	Qualification to quarterfinals
7	Darüşşafaka	26	13	13	Qualification to first round
8	Oyak Renault	26	13	13	Qualification to first round
9	Tekelspor	26	11	15	Qualification to first round
10	Beşiktaş	26	11	15	Qualification to first round
11	Büyük Kolej	26	9	17	
12	İTÜ	26	7	19	
13	Göztepe (R)	26	5	21	Relegated to Turkish First League
14	TED Kolejliler (R)	26	4	22	Relegated to Turkish First League

Source: TBLStat.net
(R) Relegated
- Göztepe and TED Kolejliler have been relegated from the Turkish Basketball First League.
  Tofaş and Tuborg Pilsener won promotion from the second league and played the 2004–2005 season in the Turkish Basketball First League.

== Turkish Basketball League 2002–03 play-offs ==
as of June 30, 2003

The 2003 Turkish Basketball League play-offs is the final phase of the 2002–2003 regular season.

First round, Quarterfinal and Semifinal series are 5-match series. The teams reaches the first 3 wins is through to the next round. The team which has won both regular season matchups starts with a 1–0 lead to the series. If teams split up the regular season meetings, series starts with a 1–1 draw.

Final series are 7-match series and the team reaches first 4 wins is the champion of the Turkish Basketball League.

1.Round
8	Oyak Renault	3
9	Tekelspor	2
7	Darüşşafaka	2
10	Beşiktaş	3

Quarter Finals
1	Ülkerspor	3
8	Oyak Renault	0
4	Türk Telekom	3
5	Pınar Karşıyaka	1
2	Efes Pilsen	3
10	Beşiktaş	0
3	Galatasaray	3
6	Fenerbahçe	2

Semi-Finals
1	Ülkerspor	3
4	Türk Telekom	1
2	Efes Pilsen	3
3	Galatasaray	0

Finals
1	Ülkerspor	3
2	Efes Pilsen	4
