= Mitch Smith =

American basketball player (born 1966)

Mitchell 'Mitch' Smith
Personal information
- Born: September 4, 1966 (age 58); Arizona, U.S.
- Listed height: 6 ft 8 in (2.03 m)
- Listed weight: 215 lb (98 kg)

Career information
- High school: Alhambra High School (Phoenix, Arizona)
- College: Utah (1985–1989)
- NBA draft: 1989: undrafted
- Playing career: 1989–1999
- Position: Power forward / center
- Number: 14, 43

Career history
- 1989-1990: CB Las Rozas
- 1990-1991: Pınar Karşıyaka
- 1991-1992: Nasaş G.S.K.
- 1992–1993: CB Tarragona
- 1993-1994: PTT Ankara
- 1994–1995: Fenerbahçe
- 1995–1996: Netaş
- 1996–1997: Kayseri Meysuspor
- 1997–1998: Spirou Charleroi
- 1998-1999: Pınar Karşıyaka

Mitchell 'Mitch' Smith (born 4 September 1966) is former professional basketball player. He played most of his career in Turkey. He graduated from the University of Utah with a B.Sc. degree in sociology in 1989.

== High school ==
As a senior in high school he averaged 27 points and 14 rebounds while leading Alhambra High School to a state championship.

== College ==
After his senior year of high school, Smith was in high demand among college recruiters. He recalls that 56 coaches came to his house seeking his sports abilities for their team. Lynn Archibald persuaded him to play for Utah.

His career numbers at Utah are still among the best in the school record books. In addition to top-10 marks in rebounding, blocked shots and minutes played, Smith is currently in 10th place on the Utes' all-time scoring list with 1,628 points, right behind Tom Chambers and just ahead of Andre Miller and Nick Jacobsen. As of 2017, he still ranks high on the school’s career lists for scoring (10th), rebounding (fourth), blocked shots (third), free throws (eighth), and steals (seventh).

== Professional career ==
He spent most of his professional career in Turkey and played for Pınar Karşıyaka, Nasaş, PTT Ankara, Fenerbahçe, Netaş and Kayseri Meysuspor. He also played for Tarragona and Las Rozas in Spain, for Spirou Charleroi in Belgium.

== Honours ==
Turkish Basketball League

- Runners-up: 1994–95

Turkish Cup

- Runners-up: 1991–92

Turkish Presidential Cup

- Winner: 1994–95

Belgian League

- Champion: 1997–98

Belgian Supercup

- Winner: 1997
