= Hakan Demir (coach) =

Turkish professional basketball coach (born 1968)

Trabzonspor
- Position: Head coach
- League: BSL; FIBA Champions League

Personal information
- Born: November 24, 1968 (age 57) Elazığ, Turkey

Career history

Coaching
- 1999–2005: Efes Pilsen (assistant)
- 2005–2006: Tekelspor
- 2006–2007: Mersin BB
- 2007–2008: Herens Basket
- 2008–2009: Beşiktaş
- 2009–2012: Pınar Karşıyaka
- 2013–2015: Trabzonspor Medikal Park
- 2016–2017: Best Balıkesir
- 2018–2020: Teksüt Bandırma
- 2020–2021: Tofaş
- 2022: CS Dinamo București
- 2022–2023: Manisa BB
- 2023–2024: Iran
- 2024–present: Qatar
- 2026–present: Trabzonspor

Hakan Demir (born November 24, 1968) is a Turkish professional basketball coach. He is currently the head coach of Trabzonspor of the Turkish Basketbol Süper Ligi (BSL) and Qatar national basketball team.
