= Stéphane Pelle =

Cameroonian basketball player

Personal information
- Born: April 15, 1980 (age 46) Yaoundé, Cameroon
- Listed height: 2.05 m (6 ft 9 in)
- Listed weight: 113 kg (249 lb)

Career information
- High school: Mercersburg Academy (Mercersburg, Pennsylvania)
- College: Colorado (1999–2003)
- NBA draft: 2003: undrafted
- Playing career: 2003–2018
- Position: Power forward

Career history
- 2003–2004: Tekelspor
- 2004–2005: ASVEL
- 2005–2008: Liège Basket
- 2008–2009: Okapi Aalstar
- 2009–2012: Oostende
- 2012–2013: Excelsior Brussels
- 2017–2018: Groot-Dilbeek

Career highlights
- Pro Basketball League rebounding leader (2006); TBL rebounding leader (2004); 2× Third-team All-Big 12 (2002–2003); Fourth-team Parade All-American (1999)

Stéphane Pelle (born April 15, 1980) is a Cameroonian former professional basketball player. After growing up in Belgium and Kenya, he moved to the United States and he played high school basketball at Mercersburg Academy in Pennsylvania, where he was named a Parade All-American in his senior year in 1999. He signed to play in college at Colorado, where he was a two-time all-conference selection, and finished as the all-time rebounding leader with 1,054 career rebounds, and the first player in program history to reach 1,000 points and 1,000 rebounds. After going undrafted in the 2003 NBA draft, he played in the NBA Summer League with the Los Angeles Lakers and signed with the team, but was later released before the NBA season. He started his professional career with Tekelspor in Turkey, where he led the league in rebounding. He played in the 2004–05 Euroleague with French club ASVEL, and then spent the remainder of his career in Belgium.

== High school career ==
Pelle was born in Yaoundé, Cameroon, to Roger and Esther Pelle; he has two younger siblings, a brother and a sister. He started playing soccer, but he then turned to basketball when he was 14 years old while he was staying in Kenya. He left Africa for the United States, and went to live in the Washington, D.C. area with a guardian while the rest of his family stayed in Cameroon. After playing in a high school in Washington as a high school freshman, he transferred to Mercersburg Academy in Mercersburg, Pennsylvania. He was highly ranked since his sophomore year. In 1997, he was selected in the Mid-Atlantic Prep League First Team by the Washington Post.

Going into his junior season, Pelle was ranked as one of the top 150 players of his class by Athlon Sports. That year, Pelle averaged 14.6 points and 10.9 rebounds per game, and scored in double digits in 24 out of 26 games. While at Mercersburg, he played with Ugonna Onyekwe, another forward of African descent. At the end of his junior year, Pelle was a Class AA-A Third Team selection by the Associated Press, and was a Prep League First Team selection for the second year in a row. In the summer preceding his senior year he participated in the ABCD Camp, a camp for the best high school players in the United States. In his senior year he scored a season-high 28 points against Georgetown Day School, and in another game he posted 24 rebounds: he had 14 games with 20 or more points. He averaged 20 points, 11.3 rebounds, 3.5 blocks, 1.9 steals per game; for the third consecutive year he was selected in the all-league first team, and was a fourth-team Parade All-American. He retired as Mercerburg Academy all-time top scorer with 1,287 career points. He was ranked as the 64th best senior in the nation according to the Recruiting Services Consensus Index (RSCI).

== College career ==
Pelle was recruited by several major NCAA Division I programs and received offers from Colorado, Georgetown, Penn State, Stanford, Vanderbilt and Villanova. He committed to Colorado in October 1998. Pelle chose jersey number 34 and was listed at 6 ft 9 in (2.06 m) and 235 pounds (107 kg) as a freshman. Pelle played all 32 games of the season, starting 7, averaging 20.6 minutes of playing time. He was the fourth best scorer on the team, at 8.5 points per game, and was second in rebounding with 6.8 behind Jamahl Mosley's 7.1. He also made 2 out of 2 three-point field goals, the only three-pointers scored in his college career.

In his sophomore season, Pelle gained a more prominent role, and was included in the starting lineup in 14 games. On January 22, 2001, he posted 15 rebounds against Kansas, a performance he repeated against Texas on February 7; in the February 21 game against Kansas he posted 16 rebounds. On February 17, 2001, Pelle had 17 rebounds against Nebraska, along with 26 points. This performance was his career high in rebounds at the time, and he also established the Colorado record for offensive rebounds in a single game with 11. At the end of the season, Pelle was named in the All-Big 12 Most Improved Team. He averaged 11.3 points (third on the team), 7.5 rebounds (second) and 0.7 blocks (second) in 24.6 minutes per game.

Pelle's junior season saw him gain consistent starting assignments, and he recorded 26 starts out of 29 games played. On January 12, 2002, he recorded 15 rebounds against Nebraska. On January 16 he scored the game winner with 2.9 seconds remaining against Iowa State; On February 5 he had 16 rebounds against Nebraska, and on February 23 he had another 16-rebound performance against Missouri. He posted 13 double-doubles throughout the season, and averaged career highs in points (12.8) and rebounds (10.8) per game. He led the team in rebounding, being second in the Big 12 Conference, and was second on the team in scoring behind David Harrison. He was named in the Big 12 All-Underrated Team and in the All-Big 12 Third Team.

As a senior, Pelle made his season debut on November 22, 2002, against Cal Poly; on November 24 against Stetson, the second game of the season, Pelle posted 21 rebounds, a career high and one of the best rebounding performances in Colorado history. On January 22, 2003, he scored a game winner against Kansas. On January 27 he was named Big 12 Player of the Week. On January 29, he posted 15 rebounds against Texas Tech. On February 15, Pelle posted 12 rebounds against Texas A&M, reaching a career total of 974: this made him the best rebounder in the history of the Colorado Buffaloes, ahead of Cliff Meely's 971 rebounds. On February 22 he recorded 18 rebounds against Missouri. Pelle had the chance to make his debut in the NCAA tournament, playing in the first round against Michigan State: he recorded 7 points, 6 assists and 2 steals in 28 minutes. He posted 12 double-doubles in his senior season, reaching a total of 36 career double-doubles. He averaged 12 points and 9.3 rebounds for the season, fourth best in scoring and first in rebounding on his team. He was the first player in Colorado history to reach 1,000 points and 1,000 rebounds, with 1,367 and 1,054, respectively. Andre Roberson is the only other player to do so. At the end of his senior season he was a third-team All-Big 12 selection for the second consecutive season. As of 2019, Pelle ranks 13th on the Buffaloes all-time scoring list. The University of Colorado at Boulder has established the Stephane Pelle Rebounding Award, given every season to the best rebounder of the Colorado Buffaloes.

=== College statistics ===
Year	Team	GP	GS	MPG	FG%	3P%	FT%	RPG	APG	SPG	BPG	PPG
1999–00	Colorado	32	7	20.6	.410	1.000	.719	6.8	0.8	0.6	0.8	8.5
2000–01	Colorado	30	14	24.6	.479	.000	.773	7.5	0.7	1.2	0.6	11.3
2001–02	Colorado	29	26	29.5	.481	.000	.769	10.8	1.4	1.0	1.0	12.8
2002–03	Colorado	32	31	27.8	.466	.000	.797	9.3	0.8	0.9	1.0	12.0
Career		123	78	25.6	.462	.250	.764	8.6	0.9	0.9	0.9	11.1

== Professional career ==
After the end of his collegiate career, Pelle was automatically eligible for the 2003 NBA draft. At the 2003 NBA Draft Combine Pelle was measured at 6 ft 7 in (2.01 m) without shoes, weighing 246 pounds (112 kg) with an 8 ft 11 in (2.72 m) standing reach and a 7 ft 2 in (2.18 m) wingspan. Pelle was not drafted by an NBA franchise; he was selected in the 2003 Continental Basketball Association (CBA) draft by the Idaho Stampede in the first round (3rd overall). In July 2003, Pelle participated in the NBA Summer League with the Los Angeles Lakers, and signed a contract with them in August. Pelle participated in preseason games with the Lakers, but was then cut on October 23, 2003, before the start of the 2003–04 NBA season. Pelle then signed a professional contract with Tekelspor, a club in Istanbul, Turkey. He played in the 2003–04 Turkish Basketball League, appearing in 19 regular season games with averages of 18.5 points, 11.1 rebounds (best in the league) and 1.2 assists in 33.4 minutes per game. He also appeared in 5 playoff games, averaging 15 points and 11.4 rebounds.

In the summer of 2004 he played with the Atlanta Hawks at the Salt Lake City Summer League, appearing in 6 games averaging 8.7 points, 4.3 rebounds and 1 assist per game in 19 minutes of average playing time. He then signed a contract with French team ASVEL Basket of Villeurbanne, where he played in the center position. Pelle spent the whole 2004–05 season with ASVEL, playing in 34 LNB Pro A games, averaging 12 points and 7.9 rebounds in 24.9 minutes per game. He also played during the 2004–05 Euroleague, appearing in 14 games with averages of 8.3 points and 7.3 rebounds. On November 11, 2004, Pelle recorded 20 rebounds in a Euroleague game against Scavolini Pesaro, one of the best individual rebounding games in Euroleague history.

After leaving ASVEL in the summer of 2005, Pelle signed with Belgian team Liège Basket. In his first season in Belgium he averaged 11.9 points and 9 rebounds per game over 35 appearances, leading the league in rebounding. He was confirmed by the club for the following season, and averaged 11.4 points and 7 rebounds (5th in the league) in 35 games. In his final season at Liège, Pelle posted averages of 12.4 points and 7.4 rebounds (4th in the league) per game in 36 league games.

Pelle left Liège in 2008, and signed with Okapi Aalstar, another Belgian team. During the 2008–09 season, Pelle averaged 14.2 points and 7.3 rebounds per game, finishing 6th in the league in rebounding. In the following season, Pelle played with Oostende, and averaged 7.9 points and 6.5 rebounds per game. in March 2010, he extended the contract with Oostende for another year. In the 2010–11 season, Pelle played 24 games with 13.4 minutes of playing time (a career low as a professional) and averaged 5 points and 3.4 rebounds per game. He ended out of the top 10 rebounders of the Belgian league for the first time since his arrival in Belgium in 2005.

Pelle played for Excelsior Brussels, a team of the 2e Nationale, the second tier of Belgian basketball, in the 2012–13 season. Pelle briefly came out of retirement in 2017, playing for Groot-Dilbeek in the third level of Belgian basketball in 2017–18.
