= 2005–06 Turkish Basketball League =

Basketball league in Turkey

Turkish Basketball League
- Season: 2005–06

Regular season
- Relegated: İ.T.Ü., Erdemirspor

Finals
- Champions: Ülkerspor (4th title)
- Runners-up: Efes Pilsen
- Semifinalists: Beşiktaş Cola Turka, Banvitspor

Statistical leaders
Points	Malik Dixon	22.6
Rebounds	Mike Benton	10.8
Assists	Kerem Tunçeri	6.4

Records
- Attendance: 334,425
- Average attendance: 1,276

The 2005–06 Turkish Basketball League was the 40th season of the top-tier professional basketball league in Turkey. The season started on October 15, 2005. Ülkerspor won their fourth national championship this season.

== Regular season standings ==
Last updated May 31, 2006

Clinched play-off berth
Season over
Relegated

Pos	Club	Pld	W	L	PF	PA	Pts
1	Ülkerspor	30	25	5	2412	2013	55
2	Efes Pilsen	30	24	6	2333	1992	54
3	Beşiktaş Cola Turka	30	23	7	2395	2165	53
4	Bandırma Banvit	30	21	9	2373	2152	51
5	Türk Telekom	30	21	9	2486	2255	51
6	Tekelspor	30	18	12	2359	2219	48
7	Fenerbahçe	30	18	12	2379	2220	48
8	Galatasaray Café Crown	30	16	14	2314	2280	46
9	Darüşşafaka	30	15	15	2222	2284	45
10	Pınar Karşıyaka	30	13	17	2230	2320	43
11	Tuborg Pilsener	30	11	19	2179	2240	41
12	Büyük Kolej	30	10	20	2131	2257	40
13	Beykozspor	30	9	21	2070	2317	39
14	Mersin BŞB.	30	9	21	2478	2604	39
15	Erdemirspor	30	7	23	2181	2432	37
16	İ.T.Ü.	30	0	30	1712	2504	30

Unfortunately, after this season Tuborg Pilsener and Büyük Kolej decided to withdraw from the Turkish Basketball League because of the financial problems. Erdemirspor and İ.T.Ü. relegated to Turkish Second Basketball League. Tofaş, Oyak Renault, Casa TED Kolejliler and Mutlu Akü Selçuk Üniversitesi have been promoted to the Turkish Basketball First League for the 2006–07 season.

== Turkish Basketball League 2005–06 play-offs ==
Last updated June 4, 2008

The 2006 Turkish Basketball League play-offs is the final phase of the 2005–06 regular season.

Quarterfinal and Semifinal series are 5-match series. The teams reaches the first 3 wins is through to the next round. The team which has won both regular season matchups starts with a 1–0 lead to the series.

Final series are 7-match series and the team reaches first 4 wins is the champion of the Turkish Basketball League.

Quarter Finals
1	Ülkerspor	3
8	Galatasaray Café Crown	0
4	Bandırma Banvit	3
5	Türk Telekom	2
2	Efes Pilsen	3
7	Fenerbahçe	0
3	Beşiktaş Cola Turka	3
6	Tekelspor	1

SemiFinals
1	Ülkerspor	3
4	Bandırma Banvit	1
2	Efes Pisen	3
3	Beşiktaş Cola Turka	2

Finals
1	Ülkerspor	4
2	Efes Pilsen	0

Turkish Basketball League
2005–06 Champion
Ülkerspor
Fourth Title

== 2005–06 play-off seedings, results and schedules ==
=== Quarter finals ===
(1) Ülkerspor (25–5) vs. (8) Galatasaray Café Crown (16–14) (Series starts 1–0)

- Game 1 11 May 2006, Istanbul: Ülkerspor: 70, Galatasaray Café Crown: 54 (2–0)
- Game 2 13 May 2006, Istanbul: Galatasaray Café Crown: 69, Ülkerspor: 79 (0–3)

Ülkerspor wins the series 3:0

(2) Efes Pilsen (24–6) vs. (7) Fenerbahçe (18–12) (Series starts 1–0)

- Game 1 10 May 2006, Istanbul: Efes Pilsen: 68, Fenerbahçe: 59 (2–0)
- Game 2 12 May 2006, Istanbul: Fenerbahçe: 72, Efes Pilsen: 74 (0–3)

Efes Pilsen wins the series 3:0

(3) Beşiktaş Cola Turka (23–7) vs. (6) Tekelspor (18–12) (Series starts 0–0)

- Game 1 10 May 2006, Istanbul: Beşiktaş Cola Turka: 86, Tekelspor: 70 (1–0)
- Game 2 12 May 2006, Istanbul: Beşiktaş Cola Turka: 91, Tekelspor: 76 (2–0)
- Game 3 14 May 2006, Istanbul: Tekelspor: 94, Beşiktaş Cola Turka: 87 (1–2)
- Game 4 16 May 2006, Istanbul: Tekelspor: 72, Beşiktaş Cola Turka: 73 (1–3)

Beşiktaş Cola Turka wins the series 3:1

(4) Bandırma Banvit (21–9) vs. (5) Türk Telekom (21–9) (Series starts 1–0)

- Game 1 10 May 2006, Bandırma: Bandırma Banvit: 83, Türk Telekom: 70 (2–0)
- Game 2 13 May 2006, Ankara: Türk Telekom: 90, Bandırma Banvit: 69 (1–2)
- Game 3 15 May 2006, Ankara: Türk Telekom: 77, Bandırma Banvit: 69 (2–2)
- Game 4 18 May 2006, Bandırma: Bandırma Banvit: 80, Türk Telekom: 76 (3–2)

Bandırma Banvit wins the series 3:2

=== Semifinals ===
(1) Ülkerspor (25–5) vs. (4) Bandırma Banvit (21–9) (Series starts 0–0)

- Game 1 21 May 2006, Istanbul: Ülkerspor: 75, Bandırma Banvit: 67 (1–0)
- Game 2 24 May 2006, Istanbul: Ülkerspor: 72, Bandırma Banvit: 63 (2–0)
- Game 3 27 May 2006, Bandırma: Bandırma Banvit: 95, Ülkerspor: 82 (1–2)
- Game 4 29 May 2006, Bandırma: Bandırma Banvit: 78, Ülkerspor: 86 (1–3)

Ülkerspor wins the series 3:1

(2) Efes Pilsen (24–6) vs. (3) Beşiktaş Cola Turka (23–7) (Series starts 0–1)

- Game 1 20 May 2006, Istanbul: Efes Pilsen: 77, Beşiktaş Cola Turka: 55 (1–1)
- Game 2 23 May 2006, Istanbul: Beşiktaş Cola Turka: 55, Efes Pilsen: 61 (1–2)
- Game 3 26 May 2006, Istanbul: Beşiktaş Cola Turka: 57, Efes Pilsen: 55 (2–2)
- Game 4 28 May 2006, Istanbul: Efes Pilsen: 80, Beşiktaş Cola Turka: 63 (3–2)

Efes Pilsen wins the series 3:2

=== League Finals ===
(1) Ülkerspor (25–5) vs. (2) Efes Pilsen (24–6) (Series starts 1–0)

- Game 1 2 June 2006, Istanbul: Ülkerspor: 72, Efes Pilsen: 65 (2–0)
- Game 2 4 June 2006, Istanbul: Efes Pilsen: 74, Ülkerspor: 78(ET) (0–3)
- Game 3 7 June 2006, Istanbul: Efes Pilsen: 62, Ülkerspor: 76 (0–4)

Ülkerspor wins the series 4:0
