= Mirsad Türkcan =

Serbian basketball player (born 1976)

- Türkcan in 2026

Personal information
- Born: June 7, 1976 (age 50) Novi Pazar, SR Serbia, SFR Yugoslavia
- Listed height: 6 ft 9 in (2.06 m)
- Listed weight: 250 lb (113 kg)

Career information
- NBA draft: 1998: 1st round, 18th overall pick
- Drafted by: Houston Rockets
- Playing career: 1994–2012
- Position: Power forward
- Number: 6, 16

Career history
- 1994–1999: Efes Pilsen
- 1999–2000: New York Knicks
- 2000: Milwaukee Bucks
- 2000–2001: Paris Basket Racing
- 2001–2002: CSKA Moscow
- 2002–2003: Montepaschi Siena
- 2003–2004: CSKA Moscow
- 2004–2005: Dynamo Moscow
- 2005–2006: Ülkerspor
- 2006–2012: Fenerbahçe

Career highlights
- EuroLeague Regular Season MVP (2002); EuroLeague Top 16 MVP (2003); All-EuroLeague First Team (2004); 2× All-EuroLeague Second Team (2002, 2003); EuroLeague Legend (2017); FIBA Korać Cup champion (1996); 8× TBSL champion (1994, 1996, 1997, 2006–2008, 2010, 2011); 6× Turkish Cup winner (1994, 1996–1998, 2010, 2011); 5× Turkish Super Cup winner (1993, 1996, 1998, 2006, 2007); RPBL champion (2004); No. 6 retired by Fenerbahçe (2012)
- Stats at NBA.com
- Stats at Basketball Reference
Medals
Men's basketball
Representing Turkey
FIBA EuroBasket
Silver medal – second place	2001 Turkey

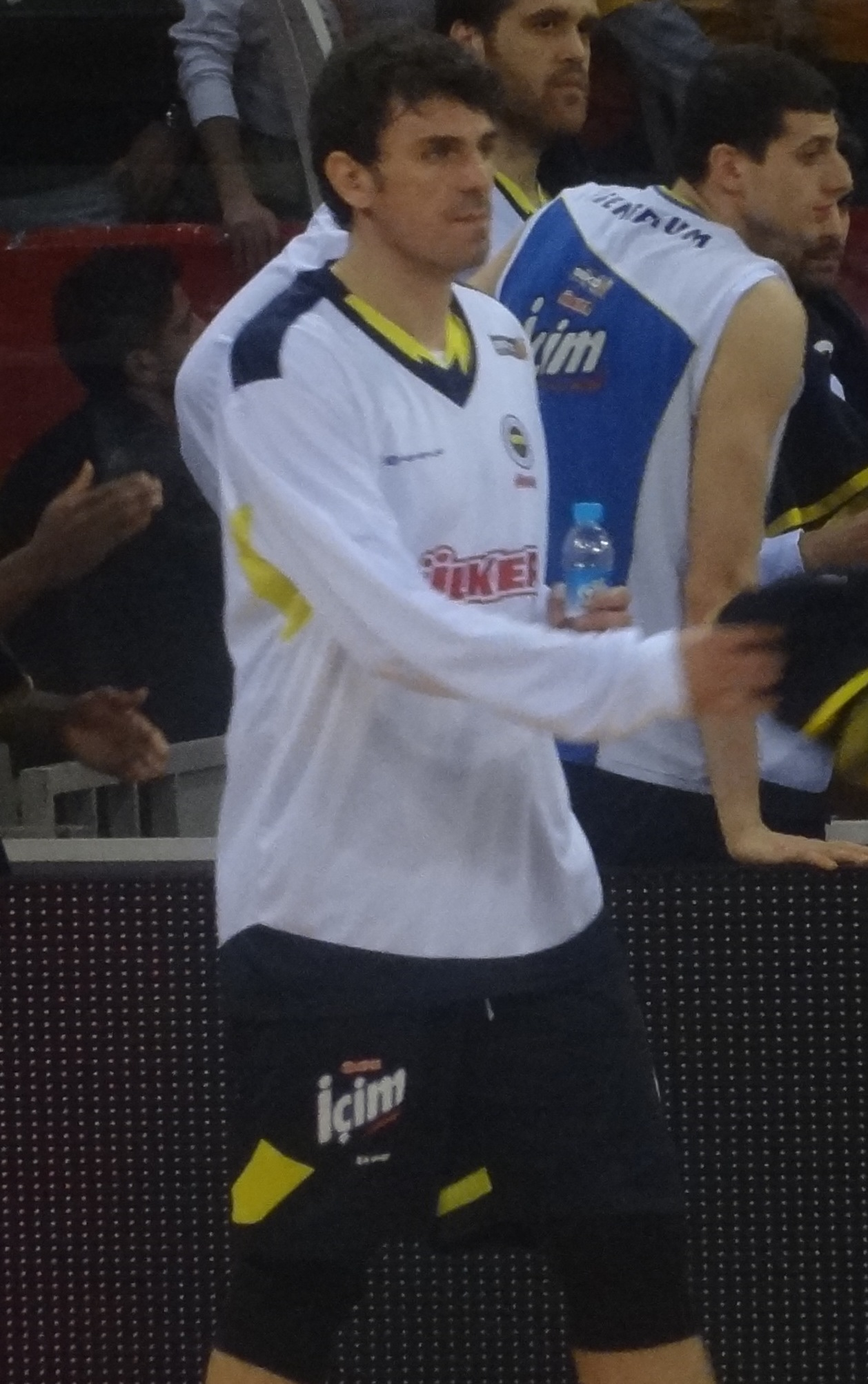
Türkcan with Fenerbahçe in 2012

Mirsad Türkcan (born Mirsad Jahović, Serbian Cyrillic: Мирсад Јаховић; on June 7, 1976) is a former professional basketball player of Bosniak origin who represented Turkey and is currently a sports agent. Standing at a height of 6 ft 9 in (2.06 m), he played the power forward position.

Born in Novi Pazar, SR Serbia, he moved to play basketball in Turkey. At the same time, he also obtained Turkish citizenship, and started playing international basketball with the senior Turkey national team. In 1999, he became the first Turkish basketball player to play in the National Basketball Association (NBA).

In the EuroLeague, Türkcan amassed a total of 50 double doubles, and is one of only three players since the year 2000 to record a 20-point, 20-rebound game (27 points and 23 rebounds). He led the EuroLeague in rebounding five times. He was nominated for the EuroLeague 2001–10 All-Decade Team, but did not make the final list. He became a EuroLeague Legend in 2017.

== Professional career ==
=== Early years ===
Türkcan grew up with Efes Pilsen's junior teams, and he made his professional debut with the Efes Pilsen senior men's team, during the 1994–95 season. He won two Turkish Super League championships, in the 1995–96 and 1996–97 seasons with Efes.

=== NBA ===
Türkcan was selected by the Houston Rockets in the 1998 NBA draft. A few days after the draft night, he said in an interview: "This is a big step for me, but I played in Turkey, and I am the first Turkish player to come into the NBA. This is very important for me, for my family, and for my country." Because of the 1998–99 NBA lockout, he returned to Istanbul, continuing to play for Efes Pilsen. Later, his rights were traded to the Philadelphia 76ers, in January 1999, and then to the New York Knicks, in March. He eventually signed with the Knicks, and debuted in the 1999–00 season, in which he played in only 7 games. After being waived in February 2000, he finished his NBA adventure by playing 10 games for the Milwaukee Bucks.

=== Return to Europe ===
In January 2001, Türkcan moved to France, signing for the remainder of the season with Paris Basket Racing. He then signed a contract with the Russian club CSKA Moscow, for the 2001–02 season. He signed a contract with the Italian club Montepaschi Siena, for the 2002–03 season. He moved back to Russia for the 2003–04 season, being again signed by CSKA Moscow. Türkcan then played with Dynamo Moscow of the Russian Championship, in the 2004–05 season.

In the summer of 2006, he signed a contract with the Turkish team Fenerbahçe. During the EuroLeague 2008–09 season, he became the first basketball player to amass at least 1,000 total rebounds in the EuroLeague, since the start of the 2000–01 season. In the summer of 2009, he extended his contract with the Turkish club for the next two seasons. In February 2011, Türkcan ruptured the anterior cruciate ligaments in his left knee, during the Turkish Cup final, and because of that, he missed the rest of the season.

In July 2012, it was reported that Türkcan would announce his retirement, after 19 years of playing professional basketball. Türkcan ended his playing career with a farewell exhibition game, in September 2012.

== Career statistics ==
Legend
GP	Games played	GS	Games started	MPG	Minutes per game
FG%	Field-goal percentage	3P%	3-point field-goal percentage	FT%	Free-throw percentage
RPG	Rebounds per game	APG	Assists per game	SPG	Steals per game
BPG	Blocks per game	PPG	Points per game	PIR	Performance index rating
**Bold**	Career high

=== NBA ===
==== Regular season ====
Year	Team	GP	GS	MPG	FG%	3P%	FT%	RPG	APG	SPG	BPG	PPG
1999–2000	New York	7	0	3.6	.200	.000	.000	1.4	.1	**.3**	.0	.6
1999–2000	Milwaukee	**10**	0	**6.5**	**.429**	.000	**.625**	**2.3**	**.4**	.1	**.1**	**2.9**
Career		17	0	5.3	.368	.000	.625	1.9	.3	.2	.1	1.9

==== Playoffs ====
Year	Team	GP	GS	MPG	FG%	3P%	FT%	RPG	APG	SPG	BPG	PPG
1999	Milwaukee	2	0	5.0	.200	.000	1.000	1.0	.0	.0	.0	2.0
Career		2	0	5.0	.200	.000	1.000	1.0	.0	.0	.0	2.0

=== EuroLeague ===
*	Led the league

Year	Team	GP	GS	MPG	FG%	3P%	FT%	RPG	APG	SPG	BPG	PPG	PIR
2001–02	CSKA Moscow	17	15	33.6	.517	.333	.709	**12.8***	**2.1**	1.2	**1.2**	**17.6**	**25.8***
2002–03	Mens Sana	**21**	**21**	**35.6**	**.520**	.473	.707	11.8*	**2.1**	**2.1**	.8	14.6	24.0*
2003–04	CSKA Moscow	20	18	25.6	.443	.245	.681	10.4	1.1	.8	.3	9.9	17.4
2005–06	Ülkerspor	16	11	29.7	.451	.320	.768	8.9*	1.5	1.4	.5	11.7	17.3
2006–07	Fenerbahçe	11	10	25.9	.419	.231	.750	9.2	1.1	1.2	.6	8.1	14.5
2007–08	Fenerbahçe	12	7	27.2	.436	.241	.793	9.2	1.3	.6	.8	9.8	14.7
2008–09	Fenerbahçe	14	11	27.4	.489	**.513**	.833	8.6*	1.1	.6	.4	15.4	19.4
2009–10	Fenerbahçe	1	0	10.3	.250	.000	—	2.0	—	—	—	2.0	0.0
2010–11	Fenerbahçe	12	0	21.0	.474	.361	.400	7.3*	.8	.8	.2	7.9	11.8
2011–12	Fenerbahçe	5	0	16.8	.316	.200	**1.000**	9.6	1.0	.4	—	3.4	9.6
Career		129	94	28.5	.474	.345	.726	10.0	1.4	1.1	.6	11.8	18.3

== National team career ==
Türkcan was a member of the senior Turkey national team that won the silver medal at the EuroBasket 2001. He also played with Turkey's senior national team at the following major international tournaments: the EuroBasket 1995, the EuroBasket 1997, the EuroBasket 1999, the 2002 FIBA World Championship, the EuroBasket 2003, and the EuroBasket 2005.

== Personal life ==
Mirsad Jahović was born in Novi Pazar, Serbia to Bosniak parents. He is known for various philanthropic and humanitarian activities in his hometown. His sister, Emina Jahović, is a pop singer, and the former wife of singer Mustafa Sandal. Türkcan is known to have financially helped jump start her recording career.

On December 18, 2005, Türkcan married then 19-year-old Dina Džanković, his then-girlfriend of five months, and the 2005 Miss Serbia and Montenegro. They have three children together: two girls, Naba and Karia, and a boy, Nusret. The couple divorced in 2012. In 2015, Türkcan married Dušica Drljević, who gave birth to their son, Rejjan Mete, the same year.

== Awards and accomplishments ==
=== Professional career ===
- 5× Turkish Super Cup Winner: (1993, 1996, 1998, 2006, 2007)
- 6× Turkish Cup Winner: (1994, 1996, 1997, 1998, 2010, 2011)
- 8× Turkish Super League Champion: (1994, 1996, 1997, 2006, 2007, 2008, 2010, 2011)
- FIBA Korać Cup Champion: (1996)
- 2× EuroLeague Final Four Participant: (2003, 2004)
- Russian League Champion: (2004)

=== Individual ===
- EuroLeague Regular Season MVP: (2002)
- EuroLeague Top 16 MVP: (2003)
- 3× All-EuroLeague Team:
  - All-EuroLeague First Team: (2004)
  - 2× All-EuroLeague Second Team: (2002–2003)
- 5× Rebound leader of the EuroLeague: (2002, 2003, 2006, 2009, 2011)
- Rebound leader of the Italian League: (2003)
- Rebound leader of the Russian Super League: (2005)
- Number 6 jersey retired by Fenerbahçe: (2012)
- EuroLeague Legend: (2017)

== Notes ==
a.	Serbian spelling: Мирсад Туркџан, Mirsad Turkdžan. He was born as Мирсад Јаховић, Mirsad Jahović.
