= 2001–02 Turkish Basketball League =

Basketball league in Turkey

Turkish Basketball League
- Season: 2001–02

Regular season
- Relegated: –

Finals
- Champions: Efes Pilsen (9th title)
- Runners-up: Ülker
- Semifinalists: Darüşşafaka, Oyak Renault

Statistical leaders
Points	Bekir Yarangüme	21.1
Rebounds	Glen Whisby	13.3
Assists	Kemal Tunçeri	5.8

The 2001–02 Turkish Basketball League was the 36th season of the top-tier professional basketball league in Turkey. The season started on October 13, 2011. Efes Pilsen won their ninth national championship this season.

== Regular season ==
=== League table ===
Pos	Team	Pld	W	L	Qualification or relegation
1	Efes Pilsen	22	20	2	Qualification to quarterfinals
2	Ülker	22	20	2	Qualification to quarterfinals
3	Darüşşafaka	22	17	5	Qualification to quarterfinals
4	Türk Telekom	22	13	9	Qualification to quarterfinals
5	Oyak Renault	22	12	10	Qualification to quarterfinals
6	Pınar Karşıyaka	22	12	10	Qualification to quarterfinals
7	Beşiktaş	26	13	13	Qualification to first round
8	Galatasaray	26	11	15	Qualification to first round
9	Fenerbahçe	26	10	16	Qualification to first round
10	İTÜ	22	6	16	Qualification to first round
11	TED Kolejliler	22	4	18	
12	Büyük Kolej	22	2	20	

Source: TBLStat.net

== Beko Basketball League 2001–02 play-offs ==
as of June 30, 2002

The 2002 Beko Basketball League play-offs is the final phase of the 2001–2002 regular season.

First round, Quarterfinal and Semifinal series are 5-match series. The teams reaches the first 3 wins is through to the next round. The team which has won both regular season matchups starts with a 1–0 lead to the series. If teams split up the regular season meetings, series starts with a 1–1 draw.

Final series are 7-match series and the team reaches first 4 wins is the champion of the Beko Basketball League.

First Round
8	Beşiktaş	3
9	İTÜ	2
7	Galatasaray	2
10	Fenerbahçe	3

Quarter Finals
2	Ülker	3
7	Beşiktaş	1
3	Darüşşafaka	3
6	Pınar Karşıyaka	1
4	Türk Telekom	1
5	Oyak Renault	3
1	Efes Pilsen	3
9	Fenerbahçe	0

Semi-Finals
2	Ülker	3
3	Darüşşafaka	0
5	Oyak Renault	0
1	Efes Pilsen	3

Finals
2	Ülker	2
1	Efes Pilsen	4
