= 2004–05 Turkish Basketball League =

Basketball league in Turkey

Turkish Basketball League
- Season: 2004–05

Regular season
- Relegated: –

Finals
- Champions: Efes Pilsen (12th title)
- Runners-up: Beşiktaş
- Semifinalists: Fenerbahçe, Ülker

Statistical leaders
Points	Harun Erdenay	21.4
Rebounds	David Lee Dixon	10.9
Assists	Mark Dickel	8.7

The 2004–05 Turkish Basketball League was the 39th season of the top-tier professional basketball league in Turkey. The season started on October 22, 2004. Efes Pilsen won their twelfth national championship this season.

== Regular season ==
=== League table ===
Pos	Team	Pld	W	L	Qualification or relegation
1	Efes Pilsen	26	24	2	Qualification to quarterfinals
2	Ülker	26	21	5	Qualification to quarterfinals
3	Beşiktaş	26	17	9	Qualification to quarterfinals
4	Fenerbahçe	26	16	10	Qualification to quarterfinals
5	Pınar Karşıyaka	26	16	10	Qualification to quarterfinals
6	Tuborg Pilsener (Note: Tuborg Pilsener have been deducted 1 point because of the incidents happened by the Efes Pilsen Game.)	26	16	10	Qualification to quarterfinals
7	Türk Telekom (Note: Türk Telekom have been deducted 1 point because of the incidents happened by the Erdemirspor Game.)	26	13	13	Qualification to quarterfinals
8	Tekelspor	26	10	16	Qualification to quarterfinals
9	Erdemirspor	26	10	16	
10	Darüşşafaka	26	9	17	
11	Banvitspor	26	9	17	
12	Aras İTÜ	26	8	18	
13	Galatasaray	26	7	19	
14	Büyük Kolej	26	6	20	

Source: TBLStat.net
Notes:
- Turkish Basketball Federation has decided to increase the number of the teams in the Turkish Basketball First League to 16 for the next season. As a result of these there were no relegation for the 2004–05 season.
  Mersin BŞB. and Beykozspor have won promotion from the second league and will play the 2006–07 season in the Turkish Basketball First League.

== Turkish Basketball League 2004–05 play-offs ==
Quarterfinal and Semifinal series are 5-match series. The teams reaches the first 3 wins is through to the next round. The team which has won both regular season match-ups starts with a 1–0 lead to the series.

Final series are 7-match series and the team reaches first 4 wins is the champion of the Turkish Basketball League.

Quarter Finals
1	Efes Pilsen	3
8	Tekelspor	0
4	Fenerbahçe	3
5	Pınar Karşıyaka	0
2	Ülkerspor	3
7	Türk Telekom	0
3	Beşiktaş Cola Turka	3
6	Tuborg Pilsener	0

SemiFinals
1	Efes Pilsen	3
4	Fenerbahçe	1
2	Ülkerspor	1
3	Beşiktaş Cola Turka	3

Finals
1	Efes Pilsen	4
3	Beşiktaş Cola Turka	1

Turkish Basketball League
2004–05 Champion
Efes Pilsen
Twelfth Title

== 2004–05 play-off seedings, results, and schedules ==
=== Quarterfinals ===
(1) Efes Pilsen (24–2) vs. (8) Tekelspor (10–16) (Series starts 1–0)

- Game 1 8 May 2005, Istanbul: Efes Pilsen: 78, Tekelspor: 61 (2–0)
- Game 2 10 May 2005, Istanbul: Tekelspor: 72, Efes Pilsen: 99 (0–3)

Efes Pilsen wins the series 3:0

(2) Ülkerspor (21–5) vs. (7) Türk Telekom (13–13) (Series starts 1–0)

- Game 1 9 May 2005, Istanbul: Ülkerspor: 105, Türk Telekom: 93 (2–0)
- Game 2 11 May 2005, Ankara: Türk Telekom: 85, Ülkerspor: 93 (0–3)

Ülkerspor wins the series 3:0

(3) Beşiktaş (17–9) vs. (6) Tuborg Pilsener (16–10) (Series starts 0–0)

- Game 1 9 May 2005, Istanbul: Beşiktaş: 97, Tuborg Pilsener: 77 (1–0)
- Game 2 11 May 2005, Istanbul: Beşiktaş: 91, Tuborg Pilsener: 85 (2–0)
- Game 3 13 May 2005, İzmir: Tuborg Pilsener: 78, Beşiktaş: 85 (0–3)

Beşiktaş wins the series 3:0

(4) Fenerbahçe (16–10) vs. (5) Pınar Karşıyaka (16–10) (Series starts 0–0)

- Game 1 8 May 2005, Istanbul: Fenerbahçe: 85, Pınar Karşıayaka: 59 (1–0)
- Game 2 10 May 2005, Istanbul: Fenerbahçe: 77, Pınar Karşıayaka: 67 (2–0)
- Game 3 12 May 2005, İzmir: Pınar Karşıayaka: 71, Fenerbahçe: 86 (0–3)

Fenerbahçe wins the series 3:0

=== Semifinals ===
(1) Efes Pilsen (24–2) vs. (4) Fenerbahçe (16–10) (Series starts 0–0)

- Game 1 18 May 2005, Istanbul: Efes Pilsen: 88, Fenerbahçe: 84 (1–0)
- Game 2 21 May 2005, Istanbul: Efes Pilsen: 87, Fenerbahçe: 78 (2–0)
- Game 3 23 May 2005, Istanbul: Fenerbahçe: 82, Efes Pilsen: 80 (1–2)
- Game 4 26 May 2005, Istanbul: Fenerbahçe: 63, Efes Pilsen: 70 (1–3)

Efes Pilsen wins the series 3:1

(2) Ülkerspor (21–5) vs. (3) Beşiktaş (17–9) (Series starts 0–1)

- Game 1 19 May 2005, Istanbul: Beşiktaş: 74, Ülkerspor: 73 (2–0)
- Game 2 22 May 2005, Istanbul: Ülkerspor: 96, Beşiktaş: 92 (1–2)
- Game 3 24 May 2005, Istanbul: Ülkerspor: 77, Beşiktaş: 83 (1–3)

Beşiktaş wins the series 3:1

=== League Finals ===
(1) Efes Pilsen (24–2) vs. (8) Beşiktaş (17–9) (Series starts 1–0)

- Game 1 30 May 2005, Istanbul: Efes Pilsen: 73, Beşiktaş: 68 (2–0)
- Game 2 2 June 2005, Istanbul: Beşiktaş: 78, Efes Pilsen: 73 (1–2)
- Game 3 5 June 2005, Istanbul: Beşiktaş: 78, Efes Pilsen: 93 (1–3)
- Game 4 7 June 2005, Istanbul: Efes Pilsen: 78, Beşiktaş: 68 (4–1)

Efes Pilsen wins the series 4:1.
