= List of Pro Basketball League season rebounding leaders =

In basketball, a rebound is the act of gaining possession of the ball after a missed field goal or free throw. The Basketball League Belgium Division I's rebounding title is awarded to the player with the highest rebounds per game average in a given regular season.

== Leaders ==
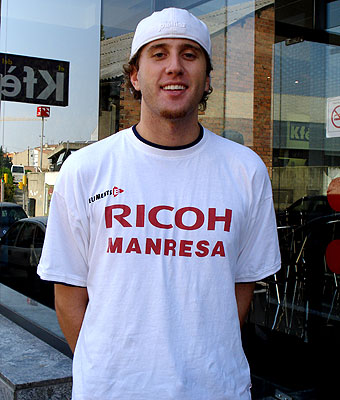
Matt Walsh led the league in rebounds in 2013

Season	Player	Position	Nationality	Team	RPG	Ref
1998–99	Daren Engellant	C	United States	BBC Aalst	11.1	
1999–00	Daren Engellant (2×)	C	United States	Okapi Aalst	13.2	
2000–01	Shaun Stonerook	PF	United States	Racing Antwerpen	12.0	
2001–02	Yves Dupont	C	Belgium	Bree	9.6	
2002–03	Yves Dupont (2×)	C	Belgium	Bree	10.2	
2003–04	Nate Fox	F/C	United States	Basket Groot Leuven	10.7	
2004–05	Ron Ellis	PF	United States	Antwerp Giants	8.9	
2005–06	Stéphane Pelle	PF	Cameroon	Liège Basket	9.2	
2006–07	Eric Poole	F/C	United States	Okapi Aalstar	9.1	
2007–08	D'or Fischer	C	United States	Euphony Bree	10.8	
2008–09	Damian Cantrell	F	United States	Okapi Aalstar	9.4	
2009–10	Will Thomas	F	United States	Liège Basket	9.1	
2010–11	Rashaun Freeman	PF	United States	Verviers-Pepinster	8.0	
2011–12	Jason Love	PF	United States	Verviers-Pepinster	8.7	
2012–13	Matt Walsh	F	United States	Belgacom Spirou	9.7	
2013–14	Jason Love (2×)	C	United States	Belfius Mons-Hainaut	10.4	
2014–15	John Fields	F	United States	betFirst Liège	10.8	
2015–16	Killian Larson	F	United States	Liège	9.0	
2016–17	Ryan Anderson	F	United States	Antwerp Giants	8.5	
2017–18	Tonye Jekiri	C	Nigeria	Oostende	7.3	
2018–19	Ibrahima Fall Faye	C	Senegal	Leuven Bears	8.9	
