= Ibrahima Fall Faye =

Senegalese basketball player

No. 2 – Shandong Hi-Speed Kirin
- Position: Power forward / center
- League: CBA

Personal information
- Born: January 10, 1997 (age 29) Fissel, Thiès, Senegal
- Listed height: 2.09 m (6 ft 10 in)
- Listed weight: 105 kg (231 lb)

Career information
- High school: SEED Academy (Dakar, Senegal)
- NBA draft: 2019: undrafted
- Playing career: 2016–present

Career history
- 2016–2017: Élan Chalon
- 2017–2018: Poitiers 86
- 2018–2019: Leuven Bears
- 2019–2021: Antwerp Giants
- 2021–2022: Monaco
- 2022–2023: Metropolitans 92
- 2023–2024: Nanterre 92
- 2024–2026: Shanxi Loongs
- 2026–present: Shandong Hi-Speed Kirin

Career highlights
- EuroCup champion (2021); Belgian Cup champion (2020); All-PBL Defensive Team (2019); PBL rebounding leader (2019); Pro A champion (2017)
Medals
Men's basketball
Representing Senegal
AfroBasket
Bronze medal – third place	2021 Rwanda
Bronze medal – third place	2025 Angola

Ibrahima Fall Faye (born January 10, 1997) is a Senegalese professional basketball player for the Shandong Hi-Speed Kirin of the Chinese Basketball Association (CBA). Internationally he represents the Senegal national team, winning bronze at two AfroBasket tournaments, and has also played in the 2019 World Cup.

== Professional career ==
Fall Faye played in the youth teams of Élan Chalon. He played 9 matches in the LNB Pro A with during the 2016–17 season, as well as three matches in the FIBA Europe Cup and one in the 2017 Leaders Cup.

In April 2018, he declared for the 2018 NBA draft.

On July 7, 2019, Fall Faye signed a two-year contract with Telenet Giants Antwerp.

On February 27, 2021, Fall Faye has signed with AS Monaco of the French LNB Pro A.

On July 24, 2022, he has signed with Metropolitans 92 of the LNB Pro A.

On June 30, 2023, he signed with Nanterre 92 of the LNB Pro A.

In September 2024, Fall Faye joined Shanxi Loongs of the Chinese Basketball Association. In October 2024, he left the team due to injury, was replaced by Alexey Shved. In December 2024, he rejoined the team.

== National team career ==
Fall Faye has been a member of the Senegal national basketball team. He played at the 2019 FIBA Basketball World Cup. He also played at the AfroBasket tournament twice, winning bronze medals in 2021 and 2025.
