= Türk Telekom B.K. =

Turkish basketball team

Türk Telekom
- Leagues: Basketbol Süper Ligi; EuroCup
- Founded: 1991; 35 years ago
- History: PTT (1991–1996); Türk Telekom PTT (1996–1998); Türk Telekom (1998–present)
- Arena: Ankara Arena
- Capacity: 10,400
- Location: Ankara, Turkey
- Team colors: Sky Blue, dark Blue, white
- President: Tahsin Yılmaz
- Head coach: Erdem Can
- Team captain: Doğuş Özdemiroğlu
- Championships: 1 Turkish Cup; 2 Turkish Supercups
- Website: turktelekombasketbol.com.tr
Home	Away

Türk Telekom Basketbol Kulübü (English: Turk Telekom Basketball Club) is a professional basketball team that is based in Ankara, Turkey. The team is currently playing in the Turkish Basketball Super League. It is a branch of the Türk Telekom GSK sports club. Their home arena is the Ankara Arena. The arena, which has a capacity of 10,400 seats, opened in April 2010.

== History ==
Türk Telekom logo used till 2016

The club was founded in 1954 and opened its basketball section as name of PTT in 1991. Thereafter, the team received name of Türk Telekom PTT in 1996. Recently, the team is continuing with the name of Türk Telekom.

Türk Telekom has won the Turkish Cup title after beating Oyak Renault in 2008. Also, the team won the Turkish President's Cup title after beating Fenerbahçe Ülker that year.

Türk Telekom also has a reserve team as name of Genç Telekom. They compete in the Turkish Basketball Second League.

In September 2011, first Turkish NBA All-Star player Mehmet Okur of the Utah Jazz announced he would play for Türk Telekom, due to the 2011 NBA lockout.

In 2016, Türk Telekom relegated from the BSL after finishing 15th in the regular season. In 2018, the team returned as it promoted from the Turkish First League. In its first season back, the club would also play in the EuroCup, as the club returns to Europe after 6 years.

The club played in the finals of the 2022–23 EuroCup Basketball season and achieved the runners-up position.

== Home arenas ==
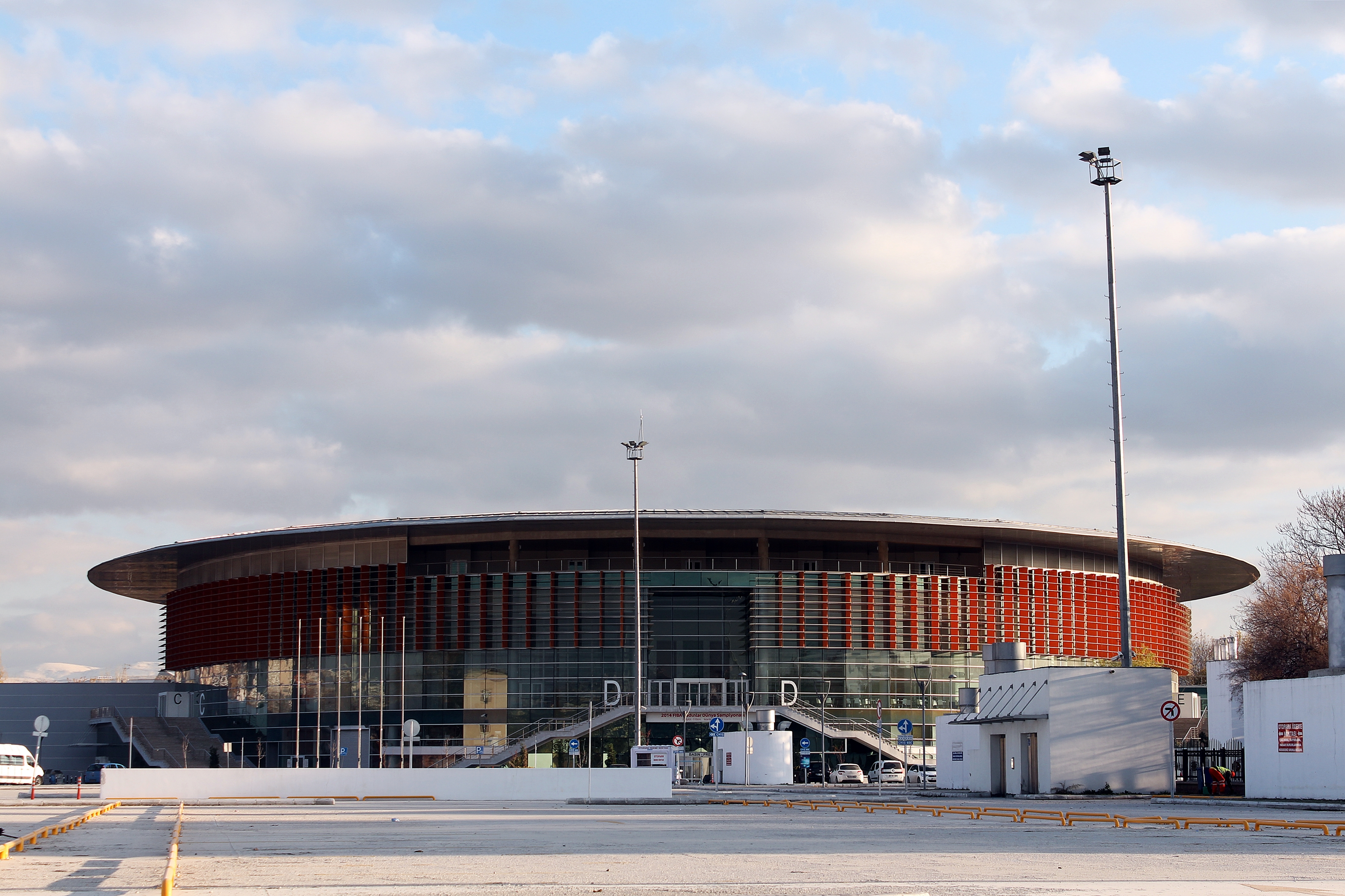
The Ankara Arena, home venue of the team since 2011

- Ankara Atatürk Sport Hall (1991–2011)
- Ankara Arena (2011–present)

== Players ==
=== Current roster ===
Note: Flags indicate national team eligibility at FIBA-sanctioned events. Players may hold other non-FIBA nationalities not displayed.

Türk Telekom roster
Players
Coaches

Pos.	No.	Nat.	Name	Ht.	Wt.	Age
F	0	(Turkey)	Alyanak, Anıl	2.03 m (6 ft 8 in)		18 – 6 January 2008
F/C	3	(Germany)	Schneider, Tim	2.08 m (6 ft 10 in)	107 kg (236 lb)	29 – 1 September 1997
SG	6	(Turkey)	Kahraman, Ata	1.93 m (6 ft 4 in)	85 kg (187 lb)	27 – 15 February 1999
G	7	(United States)	Harding, Jerrick	1.85 m (6 ft 1 in)	82 kg (181 lb)	28 – 13 April 1998
C	9	(Turkey)	Koşut, Emircan	2.16 m (7 ft 1 in)	100 kg (220 lb)	31 – 3 July 1995
G/F	10	(Serbia)	Trifunović, Uroš	2.01 m (6 ft 7 in)	96 kg (212 lb)	25 – 5 December 2000
PG	18	(Turkey)	Özdemiroğlu, Doğuş (C)	1.91 m (6 ft 3 in)	88 kg (194 lb)	30 – 17 April 1996
PG	21	(United States)	Taylor, Tony	1.83 m (6 ft 0 in)	96 kg (212 lb)	36 – 9 August 1990
F	22	(United States)	Lamb, Anthony	1.98 m (6 ft 6 in)	103 kg (227 lb)	28 – 20 January 1998
C	28	(Belgium)	Bako, Ismaël	2.08 m (6 ft 10 in)	103 kg (227 lb)	31 – 10 October 1995
F/C	30	(United States)	Bankston, Kris	2.05 m (6 ft 9 in)	109 kg (240 lb)	27 – 11 June 1999
G	55	(Turkey)	Tekçevik, Mete	1.88 m (6 ft 2 in)	85 kg (187 lb)	25 – 18 July 2001
F	57	(Turkey)	Baş, Göktuğ	2.03 m (6 ft 8 in)		25 – 8 May 2001
SF	77	(United States) (Azerbaijan)	McKissic, Shaquielle	1.96 m (6 ft 5 in)	96 kg (212 lb)	36 – 17 August 1990

Head coach

- (Turkey) Erdem Can

Assistant coach(es)

- (Turkey) Ayberk Nayır
- (Turkey) Savaş Kaynak
- (Turkey) Can Akın

Team manager

- (Turkey) Önder Külçebaş

Legend

- (C) Team captain
- (DC) Dual citizenship
- Injured

- Roster

=== Depth chart ===
Pos.	Starting 5	Bench 1	Bench 2
C	Ismaël Bako	Kris Bankston	Emircan Koşut
PF	Tim Schneider	Anıl Alyanak
SF	Shaquielle McKissic	Anthony Lamb	Göktuğ Baş
SG	Jerrick Harding	Uroš Trifunović	Mete Tekçevik
PG	Tony Taylor	Doğuş Özdemiroğlu	Ata Kahraman

=== Notable players ===
Note: Flags indicate national team eligibility at FIBA-sanctioned events. Players may hold other non-FIBA nationalities not displayed.

Criteria

To appear in this section a player must have either:

- Set a club record or won an individual award while at the club
- Played at least one official international match for their national team at any time
- Played at least one official NBA match at any time.

- (Turkey) Alper Yılmaz
- (Turkey) Berk Demir
- (Turkey) Cevher Özer
- (Turkey) Cüneyt Erden
- (Turkey) Erdal Bibo
- (Turkey) Erkan Yılmaz
- (Turkey) Kerem Tunçeri
- (Turkey) Mehmet Okur
- (Turkey) Mehmet Yağmur
- (Turkey) Murat Evliyaoğlu
- (Turkey) - (Azerbaijan) (Russia) Rasim Başak
- (Turkey) Rıdvan Öncel
- (Turkey) Semih Erden
- (Turkey) Şemsettin Baş
- (Albania) Ermal Kuqo
- (Canada) Tyler Ennis
- (Canada) Kyle Wiltjer
- (Croatia) Lukša Andrić
- (Croatia) Vladan Alanović
- (France) Axel Bouteille
- (Germany) Jan Jagla
- (Germany) Heiko Schaffartzik
- (Hungary) Jarrod Jones
- (Lithuania) Simas Jasaitis
- (Nigeria) Micheal Eric
- (Slovenia) Sani Bečirović
- (Slovenia) Aleksandar Ćapin
- (Slovenia) Goran Jagodnik
- (Slovenia) Marijan Kraljević
- (Serbia) Luka Bogdanović
- (Serbia) Mirko Milićević
- (Serbia) Miroslav Radošević
- (United States) (Croatia) Jaleen Smith
- (United States) Derrick Alston
- (United States) Dee Brown
- (United States) Richard Coffey
- (United States) Ricky Davis
- (United States) Sam Dekker
- (United States) (Turkey) Erwin Dudley
- (United States) Acie Earl
- (United States) Khalid El-Amin
- (United States) Tony Gaffney
- (United States) Jerian Grant
- (United States) (Israel) Max Heidegger
- (United States) Nick Johnson
- (United States) Tyrique Jones
- (United States) Johnny O'Bryant
- (United States) Steven Rogers
- (United States) Josh Shipp
- (United States) Mitch Smith
- (United States) Greg Stiemsma
- (United States) Jared Terrell
- (United States) Tyrone Wallace
- (United States) K'zell Wesson
- (United States) Trevor Wilson
- (United States) Rickie Winslow
- (United States) Kennedy Winston
- (United States) (Turkey) Michael Wright

== Honours ==
=== Domestic competitions ===
- Turkish League

Runners-up (2): 1996–97, 2007–08

- Turkish Cup

Winners (1): 2007–08
Runners-up (4): 1995–96, 1997–98, 2000–01, 2002–03

- Turkish Supercup

Winners (2): 1997, 2008
Runners-up (1): 1996

=== European competitions ===
- EuroCup

Runners-up (1): 2022–23
Semifinalist (1): 2025–26

== Season by season ==
Season	Tier	League	Pos.	Postseason	Turkish Cup	European Competitions	
1991–92	1	TBL	12th				
1992–93	1	TBL	9th				
1993–94	1	TBL	3rd	Semifinalist			
1994–95	1	TBL	5th	Quarterfinalist		Korać Cup	
1995–96	1	TBL	11th		Runner-up	Korać Cup	
1996–97	1	TBL	2nd	Runner-up		European Cup	
1997–98	1	TBL	6th	Quarterfinalist	Runner-up	Euroleague	
1998–99	1	TBL	9th			Saporta Cup	
1999–00	1	TBL	8th	Quarterfinalist		Korać Cup	QF
2000–01	1	TBL	4th	Semifinalist	Runner-up	Korać Cup	
2001–02	1	TBL	5th	Quarterfinalist	Semifinalist	Saporta Cup	
2002–03	1	TBL	4th	Semifinalist	Runner-up	FIBA Champions' Cup	
2003–04	1	TBL	9th		Semifinalist	FIBA Europe League	
2004–05	1	TBL	7th	Quarterfinalist	Quarterfinalist	ULEB Cup	
2005–06	1	TBL	5th	Quarterfinalist	Quarterfinalist		
2006–07	1	TBL	3rd	Semifinalist	Quarterfinalist	FIBA Eurocup	QF
2007–08	1	TBL	4th	Runner-up	Champion	ULEB Cup	
2008–09	1	TBL	3rd	Semifinalist	Quarterfinalist	Eurocup	L16
2009–10	1	TBL	5th	Quarterfinalist	Quarterfinalist	Eurocup	L16
2010–11	1	TBL	10th		Group Stage	EuroChallenge	RS
2011–12	1	TBL	9th		Group Stage	EuroChallenge	RS
2012–13	1	TBL	13th		Group Stage		
2013–14	1	TBL	11th		Quarterfinalist		
2014–15	1	TBL	7th	Quarterfinalist	Group stage		
2015–16	1	TBL	15th				
2016–17	2	TBL	8th	Quarterfinalist			
2017–18	2	TBL	1st				
2018–19	1	BSL	7th	Quarterfinalist	Semifinalist	EuroCup	RS
2019–20	1	BSL	10th^{1}	-^{1}	Semifinalist	Champions League	QF
2020–21	1	BSL	6th	Quarterfinalist		Champions League	PO
2021–22	1	BSL	11th			EuroCup	8F
2022–23	1	BSL	1st	Semifinalist		EuroCup	RU
2023–24	1	BSL	8th	Quarterfinalist		EuroCup	8F
2024–25	1	BSL	10th	Quarterfinalist		EuroCup	QF
2025–26	1	BSL	5th	Quarterfinalist	Semifinalist	EuroCup	SF

^1 Cancelled due to the COVID-19 pandemic in Europe.
