= Beşiktaş J.K. (men's basketball) =

Basketball team

Beşiktaş Fuzul
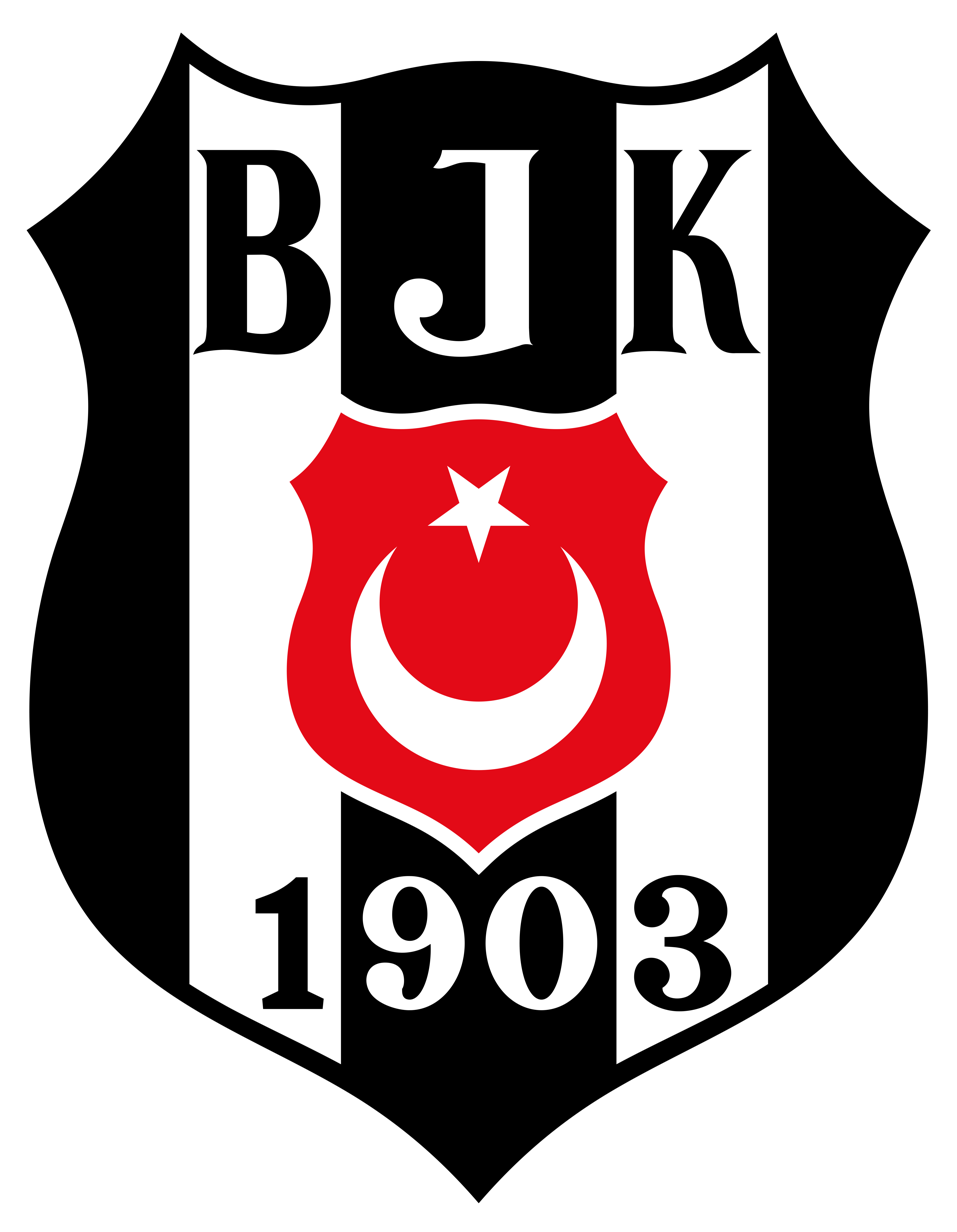
- Nickname: Kara Kartallar (The Black Eagles)
- Leagues: BSL; EuroLeague
- Founded: 1967; 59 years ago
- Arena: Basketball Development Center; Akatlar Arena
- Capacity: 10,000; 3,200
- Location: Istanbul, Turkey
- Team colors: Black, white
- President: Serdal Adalı
- Team manager: Nedim Yücel
- Head coach: Dušan Alimpijević
- Team captain: Conor Morgan
- Championships: 1 FIBA EuroChallenge; 2 Turkish Championships; 1 Turkish Cup; 1 Turkish Super Cup
- Retired numbers: 1 (8)
- Website: bjk.com.tr
Home	Away

Beşiktaş Basketbol, commonly known as Beşiktaş Istanbul or simply Beşiktaş, is a Turkish professional basketball team from the city of Istanbul. The team formed in 1967 as the basketball section of Beşiktaş J.K., which was founded in 1903. The team competes in the Turkish Basketbol Süper Ligi (BSL) and the EuroLeague. They have won the Turkish championship two times, with their most recent title coming in the 2011–12 season, and have finished as runners-up nine times, the most in league history behind only Anadolu Efes and Fenerbahçe.

== History ==
The club's men's basketball section started out in the year 1967 and since then, Beşiktaş has played in the first Turkish Basketball Super League, in every season, except in the 1988–89 season, due to their relegation to the Turkish Basketball First League after the 1987–88 season. The club won the Turkish Basketball Super League, under the management of Ateş Çubukçu and Tom Davis, in the 1974–75 season.

In October 2010, Beşiktaş announced the biggest transfer in the history of the club's basketball department, with the signing of the former NBA Most Valuable Player, Allen Iverson. Iverson signed a 2-year $4 million net income contract.

In July 2011, NBA All-Star Deron Williams of the Brooklyn Nets, announced he would play for Beşiktaş, due to the 2011 NBA lockout. His $5 million net income contract included a clause that would enable him to return to the NBA during the regular season, if an agreement was made between the owners and players association. When the lockout finished, Williams was replaced by Carlos Arroyo.

Arroyo led the team to the Turkish Cup title in February 2012. In April 2012, the team won the 3rd-tier level EuroChallenge Final against Elan Chalon. After the EuroChallenge championship, the team won the Turkish Basketball Super League Finals against Anadolu Efes. On September 30, 2012, the team won the Turkish President's Cup against Anadolu Efes.

Starting from the 2023–24 season, the team started to compete in EuroCup, departing from Basketball Champions League. They advanced to semifinals of the same year's league.

In the 2025–26 season, the team reached to the finals but they fell short to JL Bourg 2–0 and in the Finals. Later, Bourg did not promote to the EuroLeague due to financial problems and Monaco bought down to the EuroCup in the following season, The team got the license and the 20th team in the EuroLeague in the following season and the first time ever since the 2012–13 season.

== Sponsorship naming ==
Beşiktaş has had several denominations through the years due to its sponsorship;

- Beşiktaş Cola Turka: 2005–2011
- Beşiktaş Milangaz: 2011–2012
- Beşiktaş Integral Forex: 2013–2015
- Beşiktaş Sompo Japan: 2015–2020
- Beşiktaş Icrypex: 2021–2022
- Beşiktaş Emlakjet: 2022–2024
- Beşiktaş Fibabanka: 2024–2025
- Beşiktaş Gain: 2025–2026
- Beşiktaş Fuzul: 2026–present

== Players ==
=== Current roster ===
Note: Flags indicate national team eligibility at FIBA-sanctioned events. Players may hold other non-FIBA nationalities not displayed.

Beşiktaş Fuzul roster
Players
Coaches

Pos.	No.	Nat.	Name	Ht.	Wt.	Age
PG	1	(United States)	Dotson, Devon	1.85 m (6 ft 1 in)	84 kg (185 lb)	27 – 2 August 1999
F	2	(United States)	Jeffries, DaQuan	1.96 m (6 ft 5 in)	101 kg (223 lb)	29 – 30 August 1997
G/F	3	(Turkey)	Uludağ, Ömer	1.92 m (6 ft 4 in)	90 kg (198 lb)	18 – 24 July 2008
G/F	4	(United States)	Walker IV, Lonnie	1.93 m (6 ft 4 in)	93 kg (205 lb)	27 – 14 December 1998
PG	5	(United States) (Slovakia)	DeJulius, David	1.83 m (6 ft 0 in)	91 kg (201 lb)	27 – 9 August 1999
G	6	(Turkey)	Uğurlu, Berk	1.92 m (6 ft 4 in)	87 kg (192 lb)	30 – 27 April 1996
F/C	7	(Turkey)	Çeçen, Burak	1.85 m (6 ft 1 in)	88 kg (194 lb)	18 – 19 January 2008
PF	9	(Canada)	Morgan, Conor (C)	2.06 m (6 ft 9 in)	100 kg (220 lb)	32 – 3 August 1994
G	10	(Turkey)	Aksu, Yağiz	1.92 m (6 ft 4 in)	95 kg (209 lb)	20 – 31 January 2006
F/C	11	(Turkey)	Birsen, Metecan	2.08 m (6 ft 10 in)	101 kg (223 lb)	31 – 6 April 1995
G	12	(Turkey)	Wilbekin, Scottie	1.88 m (6 ft 2 in)	80 kg (176 lb)	33 – 5 April 1993
F	20	(Nigeria)	Omoruyi, Eugene	1.98 m (6 ft 6 in)	107 kg (236 lb)	29 – 14 February 1997
F	21	(United States)	Brown, Anthony	2.01 m (6 ft 7 in)	102 kg (225 lb)	34 – 10 October 1992
SG	24	(United States)	Nowell, Jaylen (injured)	1.93 m (6 ft 4 in)	91 kg (201 lb)	27 – 9 July 1999
G/F	30	(Turkey)	Korkmaz, Furkan	2.01 m (6 ft 7 in)	92 kg (203 lb)	29 – 24 July 1997
C	32	(South Sudan)	Gabriel, Wenyen	2.06 m (6 ft 9 in)	96 kg (212 lb)	29 – 26 March 1997
C	41	(Croatia)	Žižić, Ante	2.10 m (6 ft 11 in)	121 kg (267 lb)	29 – 4 January 1997
C	44	(Mali)	Sissoko, Mady (injured)	2.06 m (6 ft 9 in)	113 kg (249 lb)	25 – 20 December 2000

Head coach

- (Serbia) Dušan Alimpijević

Assistant coach(es)

- (Ukraine) Dmytro Boldaiev
- (Turkey) Sinan Çelik
- (Turkey) Buğra Bayazıt

Team manager

- (Turkey) Nedim Yücel

Legend

- (C) Team captain
- Injured

- Roster
Updated: October 15, 2026

=== EuroLeague Depth chart ===
Pos.	Starting 5	Bench 1	Bench 2	Bench 3	Inactive
C	Wenyen Gabriel	Ante Žižić	Metecan Birsen	Burak Çeçen	Mady Sissoko (injured)
PF	Eugene Omoruyi	Conor Morgan
SF	DaQuan Jeffries	Furkan Korkmaz	Anthony Brown	Ömer Uludağ
SG	Scottie Wilbekin	Lonnie Walker IV		Yağiz Aksu	Jaylen Nowell (injured)
PG	Devon Dotson	David DeJulius		Berk Uğurlu

=== BSL Depth chart ===
Pos.	Starting 5	Bench 1	Bench 2	Bench 3	Inactive
C	Ante Žižić*	Metecan Birsen	Burak Çeçen	Wenyen Gabriel*	Mady Sissoko* (injured)
PF	Eugene Omoruyi*	Conor Morgan*
SF	Anthony Brown*	DaQuan Jeffries*		Furkan Korkmaz
SG	Lonnie Walker IV*	Yağiz Aksu		Ömer Uludağ	Jaylen Nowell* (injured)
PG	Berk Uğurlu	David DeJulius*	Scottie Wilbekin	Devon Dotson*

- BSL requires a maximum of 7 registered foreign players per squad, with no more than 4 foreign players allowed on the court at any given time. Crucially, at least 1 Turkish player must remain on the floor during every second of game play. Foreign players are shown with an asterisk (*).

=== Retired numbers ===
Beşiktaş retired numbers
No	Nat.	Player	Position	Tenure	Ceremony date
8	(United States)	Deron Williams	PG	2011	29 November 2011

=== Notable players ===
Note: Flags indicate national team eligibility at FIBA-sanctioned events. Players may hold other non-FIBA nationalities not displayed.

Criteria

To appear in this section a player must have either:

- Set a club record or won an individual award while at the club
- Played at least one official international match for their national team at any time
- Played at least one official NBA match at any time.

- (Turkey) Engin Atsür
- (Turkey) Efe Aydan
- (Turkey) Ömer Büyükaycan
- (Turkey) Serhat Çetin
- (Turkey) Semih Erden
- (Turkey) Sinan Güler
- (Turkey) Şehmus Hazer
- (Turkey) Barış Hersek
- (Turkey) Furkan Korkmaz
- (Turkey) Erman Kunter
- (Turkey) Tamer Oyguç
- (Turkey) Kartal Özmızrak
- (Turkey) Kaya Peker
- (Turkey) Ufuk Sarıca
- (Turkey) Sertaç Şanlı
- (Turkey) Alperen Şengün
- (Turkey) Kenan Sipahi
- (Turkey) Kerem Tunçeri
- (Turkey) Levent Topsakal
- (Turkey) Berk Uğurlu
- (Turkey) Haluk Yıldırım
- (Turkey) (Albania) Erxhan Osmani
- (Australia) Ryan Broekhoff
- (Bosnia and Herzegovina) Ratko Varda
- (Croatia) Damir Markota
- (Croatia) Sandro Nicević
- (Finland) Erik Murphy
- (Germany) Robin Benzing
- (United Kingdom) Pops Mensah-Bonsu
- (Jamaica) Kimani Ffriend
- (Lithuania) Virginijus Praškevičius
- (Lithuania) Gediminas Orelik
- (Montenegro) Predrag Drobnjak
- (Poland) Maciej Lampe
- (Poland) Michał Sokołowski
- (Puerto Rico) Carlos Arroyo
- (Puerto Rico) Larry Ayuso
- (Russia) Fedor Likholitov
- (Serbia) Vladimir Štimac
- (Serbia) Zoran Erceg
- (United States) - (Cameroon) D. J. Strawberry
- (United States) - (Puerto Rico) John Holland
- (United States) Lonny Baxter
- (United States) Mire Chatman
- (United States) Earl Clark
- (United States) Devon Dotson
- (United States) Khalid El-Amin
- (United States) Jo Jo English
- (United States) Donnell Harvey
- (United States) Allen Iverson
- (United States) DaQuan Jeffries
- (United States) Chris Lofton
- (United States) Jaylen Nowell
- (United States) Lonnie Walker IV
- (United States) Isaiah Whitehead
- (United States) Deron Williams

== Head coaches ==
- (Turkey) Cavit Altunay: 1967–70
- (Turkey) Aydan Siyavuş: 1970–71
- (Turkey) Ünal Büyükaycan: 1971–73
- (Turkey) Cavit Altunay: 1973–74
- (Turkey) Ateş Çubukçu / (United States) Tom Davis: 1974–75
- (Turkey) Ateş Çubukçu / (United States) Tom Davis / (Turkey) Tanju Feyzioğlu: 1975
- (Turkey) Mehmet Baturalp: 1975–79
- (Turkey) Fehmi Sadıkoğlu: 1979–85
- (Turkey) Hurşit Baytok: 1985–86
- (Turkey) Aydan Siyavuş: 1986–87
- (Turkey) Hurşit Baytok: 1987–89
- (Turkey) İren İmre: 1989–90
- (Turkey) Mehmet Baturalp: 1990–91
- (Turkey) İren İmre: 1991–93
- (Turkey) Hakan Yavuz: 1993–94
- (Turkey) Cem Akdağ: 1994–95
- (Turkey) Tolga Tuğsavul: 1995–96
- (Turkey) Erman Kunter: 1996–97
- (Turkey) Ahmet Kandemir: 1997–03
- (Turkey) İhsan Bayülken: 2003–05
- (Turkey) Burak Bıyıktay: 2005
- (Turkey) Murat Didin: 2005–07
- (Turkey) Ufuk Sarıca: 2007
- (Turkey) Ergin Ataman: 2007–08
- (Turkey) Hakan Demir: 2008–09
- (Turkey) Burak Bıyıktay: 2009–11
- (Turkey) Ergin Ataman: 2011–12
- (Turkey) Erman Kunter: 2012–13
- (Turkey) Ahmet Kandemir: 2013–15
- (Finland) Henrik Dettmann: 2015–16
- (Turkey) Yağızer Uluğ: 2016
- (Turkey) Ufuk Sarıca: 2016–18
- (Montenegro) Duško Ivanović: 2018–20
- (Turkey) Burak Bıyıktay: 2020
- (Turkey) Ahmet Kandemir: 2020–22
- (Poland) Igor Miličić: 2022–23
- (Serbia) Dušan Alimpijević: 2023–present

== Honours ==
=== Domestic competitions ===
- Turkish League

Winners (2): 1974–75, 2011–12
Runners-up (9): 1971–72, 1975–76, 1976–77, 1980–81, 1981–82, 2004–05, 2016–17, 2024–25, 2025–26

- Turkish Cup

Winners (1): 2011–12
Runners-up (5): 1970–71, 1972–73, 2010–11, 2025, 2026

- Turkish Super Cup

Winners (1): 2012
Runners-up (3): 1987, 2025, 2026

=== European competitions ===
- EuroCup

Runners-up (1): 2025–26
Semifinalists (1): 2023–24

- FIBA EuroChallenge

Winners (1): 2011–12

== Season by season ==
Season	Tier	Division	Pos.	Postseason	Cup Competitions	European Competitions	
1967–68	1	TBL	5th	–	Semifinalist	–	
1968–69	1	TBL	7th	–	–	–	
1969–70	1	TBL	5th	–	–	–	
1970–71	1	TBL	5th	–	Runner-up	Cup Winners' Cup	1R
1971–72	1	TBL	2nd	–	Quarterfinalist	–	
1972–73	1	TBL	6th	–	Runner-up	–	
1973–74	1	TBL	5th	–	–	–	
1974–75	1	TBL	1st	–	–	–	
1975–76	1	TBL	2nd	–	–	Champions Cup	1R
1976–77	1	TBL	2nd	–	–	Cup Winners' Cup	2R
1977–78	1	TBL	8th	–	–	Cup Winners' Cup	1R
1978–79	1	TBL	6th	–	–	–	
1979–80	1	TBL	3rd	–	–	–	
1980–81	1	TBL	2nd	–	–	Korać Cup	2R
1981–82	1	TBL	2nd	–	–	Cup Winners' Cup	1R
1982–83	1	TBL	4th	–	–	Cup Winners' Cup	1R
1983–84	1	TBL	7th	Quarterfinalist	–	Korać Cup	1R
1984–85	1	TBL	9th	–	–	–	
1985–86	1	TBL	9th	–	–	–	
1986–87	1	TBL	1st	Quarterfinalist	–	–	
1987–88	1	TBL	11th	–	–	Korać Cup	2R
1988–89	2	TB2L	1st	Promoted	–	–	
1989–90	1	TBL	9th	–	–	–	
1990–91	1	TBL	10th	–	–	–	
1991–92	1	TBL	10th	–	Last 16	–	
1992–93	1	TBL	10th	Quarterfinalist	Quarterfinalist	–	
1993–94	1	TBL	13th	–	Last 16	–	
1994–95	1	TBL	14th	–	Last 16	–	
1995–96	1	TBL	6th	First Round	Last 16	–	
1996–97	1	TBL	13th	–	Quarterfinalist	Korać Cup	3R
1997–98	1	TBL	5th	Quarterfinalist	Last 16	–	
1998–99	1	TBL	8th	Quarterfinalist	Semifinalist	Korać Cup	QF
1999–00	1	TBL	5th	Semifinalist	Semifinalist	Korać Cup	2R
2000–01	1	TBL	7th	Quarterfinalist	–	Saporta Cup	T16
2001–02	1	TBL	7th	Quarterfinalist	–	Korać Cup	R32
2002–03	1	TBL	10th	Quarterfinalist	–	–	
2003–04	1	TBL	3rd	Semifinalist	–	–	
2004–05	1	TBL	3rd	Runner-up	Semifinalist	Europe League	QF
2005–06	1	TBL	3rd	Semifinalist	–	ULEB Cup	RS
2006–07	1	TBL	5th	Quarterfinalist	Quarterfinalist	ULEB Cup	RS
2007–08	1	TBL	1st	Semifinalist	Quarterfinalist	ULEB Cup	QF
2008–09	1	TBL	5th	Quarterfinalist	Quarterfinalist	Eurocup	RS
2009–10	1	TBL	4th	Semifinalist	Quarterfinalist	Eurocup	RS
2010–11	1	TBL	6th	Quarterfinalist	Runner-up	Eurocup	RS
2011–12	1	TBL	4th	Champion	Champion	Eurochallenge	C
2012–13	1	TBL	6th	Quarterfinalist	Semifinalist	Euroleague	T16
2013–14	1	TBL	5th	Quarterfinalist	Quarterfinalist	Eurocup	L16
2014–15	1	TBL	9th	–	–	Eurocup	L32
2015–16	1	TBL	9th	–	–	Eurocup	RS
2016–17	1	BSL	2nd	Runner-up	Quarterfinalist	Champions League	L16
2017–18	1	BSL	4th	Quarterfinalist	Semifinalist	Champions League	L16
2018–19	1	BSL	6th	Quarterfinalist	Semifinalist	Champions League	L16
2019–20	1	BSL	8th^{1}	–^{1}	–	Champions League	L16
2020–21	1	BSL	5th	Semifinalist	–^{1}	FIBA Europe Cup	RS
2021–22	1	BSL	10th	–	–	Champions League	PI
2022–23	1	BSL	14th	–	–	FIBA Europe Cup	QR2
2023–24	1	BSL	3rd	Semifinalist	Semifinalist	EuroCup	SF
2024–25	1	BSL	2nd	Runner-up	Runner-up	EuroCup	EF
2025–26	1	BSL	2nd	Runner-up	Runner-up	EuroCup	RU

^1 Cancelled due to the COVID-19 pandemic in Europe.

== See also ==
- Beşiktaş J.K.
