= Haldun Alagaş Sports Hall =

Indoor arena in Istanbul, Turkey

Haldun Alagaş Sports Hall Haldun Alagaş Spor Kompleksi
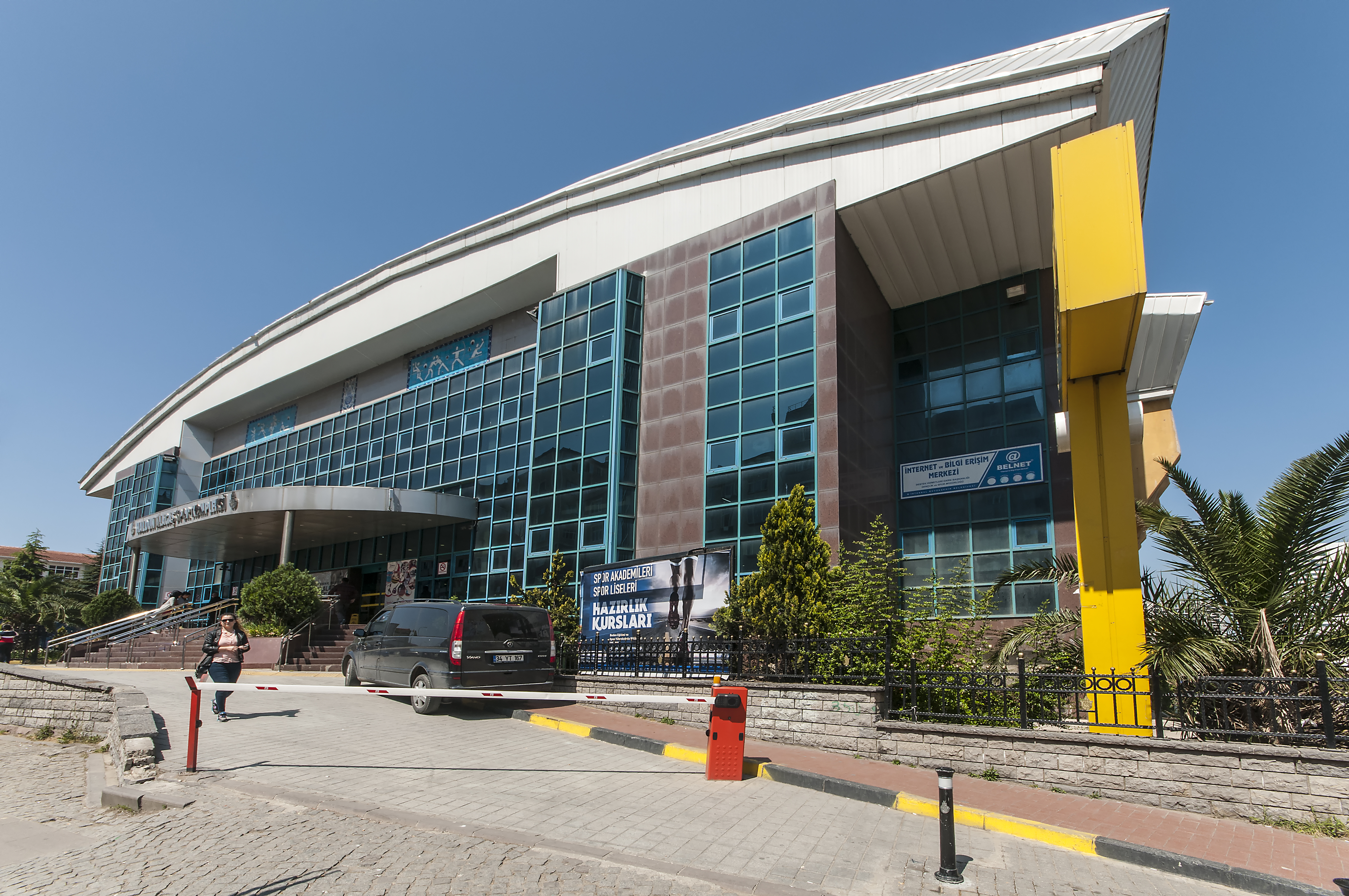
- Umraniye-Haldun-Alagas
- Interactive map of Haldun Alagaş Sports Hall; Haldun Alagaş Spor Kompleksi
- Location: Alemdağ Cad. Türk Telekom Fabrika yanı, Son durak, 34768 İnkılap, Ümraniye, Istanbul
- Coordinates: 41.02520°N 29.10466°E
- Owner: Istanbul Metropolitan Municipality
- Capacity: Basketball: 2,468

Construction
- Opened: December 2000

Tenants
- Istanbul Büyükşehir Belediyesi (Men's Volleyball); Istanbul Büyükşehir Belediyesi (Men's Handball); Tekelspor (Men's Basketball)

Haldun Alagaş Sports Hall (Istanbul)

Haldun Alagaş Sports Hall (Turkish: Haldun Alagaş Spor Kompleksi) is an indoor arena located in Istanbul, Turkey. Opened in December 2000, the arena mostly hosts basketball and volleyball games. It has a seating capacity for 2,468 spectators.

Named after the three-times World and four-times European karate champion Haldun Alagaş, the sports complex is located in Ümraniye district of Istanbul, east side of Bosporus.

== Features ==
The arena covers an area of approximately 10,000 m^{2} (110,000 sq ft) and is one of major arenas of the city on three floors and including entire units, sum of 32,000 m^{2} (340,000 sq ft).

The center serves various sport branches for over 2,000 sports people and inhabitants daily with its training facilities. Beside, it includes a library and conference hall and the car park creates a solid source of income to get by.

It is in usage of sport teams such as Istanbul Büyükşehir Belediyesi Men's Volleyball and Men's Handball Teams and Tekelspor basketball team.
