= Karşıyaka Basket =

Coordinates: 38.47448°N 27.07678°E

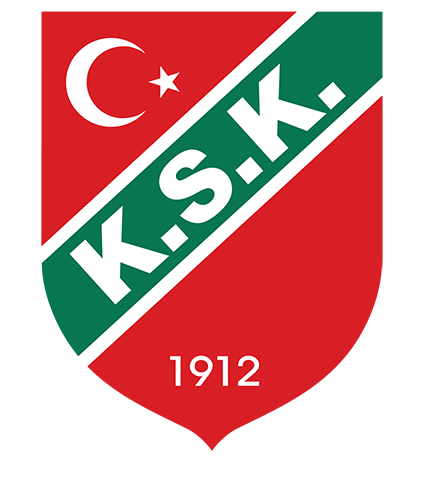
- Leagues: Basketbol Süper Ligi
- Founded: 1966; 60 years ago
- History: Karşıyaka Basket (1966 – present)
- Arena: Mustafa Kemal Atatürk Karşıyaka Sport Hall
- Capacity: 6,500
- Location: İzmir, Turkey
- Team colors: Green, red
- President: Yiğit Tusder
- Head coach: Nenad Marković
- Team captain: Yavuz Gültekin
- Championships: 2 Turkish Championships; 1 Turkish Cup; 2 President's Cups
- Website: www.kskbasketbol.net
Home	Away

Karşıyaka Basket is a Turkish professional basketball team located in Karşıyaka, İzmir, that competes in the Turkish Basketball Super League. It is a section of the multi-sport club Karşıyaka SK. The team also goes by the name of KSK, which stands for Karşıyaka Spor Kulübü (i.e., Karşıyaka Sport Club).

== History ==
Karşıyaka SK was founded in 1912 and opened its basketball section in 1966. Karşıyaka Basket is considered to be one of the most important basketball teams in all of Turkey. They first played in the Turkish Basketball League in 1966. They relegated to lower divisions in 1968. The club also played in lower divisions from 1968 to 1974. The team is still participating in the Turkish Basketball League since 1974. Karşıyaka Basket was sponsored by Yaşar Holding's Food and Beverage Group; Pınar between 1998 and 2024. Their home arena is the Karşıyaka Arena with a capacity of 6,500 seats, which was opened in 2005.

=== Achievements with Sarıca ===
Karşıyaka set to name Ufuk Sarıca as head coach in the summer of 2012. Sarıca was dreamed to be in Euroleague with Karşıyaka and he said that "We have a dream and we want to be in Euroleague in 3 years." On February 9, 2014, the team won the Turkish Cup with a victory against Anadolu Efes under managing Ufuk Sarıca. It was the first championship of club in Turkish Cup. On October 8, 2014, the team won the President's Cup by beating Fenerbahçe Ülker. In the 2014–15, Karşıyaka won its second Turkish League after 1987 championship, despite finishing the regular season in the fourth place, by defeating Fenerbahçe Ülker in the playoffs semifinals by 3–1 and Anadolu Efes 4–1 in the finals.

On 29 July 2015, EuroLeague announced the participating teams for the following season and included Karşıyaka with for the 2015–16 EuroLeague season. In its second appearance ever in the top tier of European basketball, the team won 3 games and lost 7.

== Honours ==
=== National competitions ===
Turkish Super League

- Winners (2): 1986–87, 2014–15
- Runner-up (2): 1983–84, 2022–23

Turkish Cup

- Winner (1): 2013–14
- Runner-up (1): 2004–05

President's Cup

- Winners (2): 1987, 2014

=== European competitions ===
Basketball Champions League

- Runner-up (1): 2020–21

FIBA EuroChallenge

- Runner-up (1): 2012–13

== Home arenas ==
- İzmir Atatürk Sport Hall: (1966–2005)
- Mustafa Kemal Atatürk Karşıyaka Sport Hall: (2005–present)

== Players ==
=== Current roster ===
Note: Flags indicate national team eligibility at FIBA-sanctioned events. Players may hold other non-FIBA nationalities not displayed.

Karşıyaka Basket roster
Players
Coaches

Pos.	No.	Nat.	Name	Ht.	Wt.	Age
SF	0	(Turkey)	Tahmaz, Bora	1.94 m (6 ft 4 in)		18 – 2 April 2008
SF	1	(Turkey)	Mustafa, Muhaymin	2.01 m (6 ft 7 in)		27 – 10 October 1999
PG	2	(United States)	Weber, Brianté	1.88 m (6 ft 2 in)		33 – 29 December 1992
G	3	(United States)	Munford, Xavier (injured)	1.93 m (6 ft 4 in)		34 – 1 June 1992
PG	4	(United States)	Starks, Markel	1.88 m (6 ft 2 in)		35 – 21 February 1991
PG	5	(United States)	El-Amin, Ishmael	1.89 m (6 ft 2 in)		27 – 2 December 1998
F	7	(United States)	Kelly, Rashard	2.01 m (6 ft 7 in)		31 – 22 August 1995
PF	8	(Turkey)	Sayılı, Hakan	2.03 m (6 ft 8 in)		26 – 14 February 2000
PG	10	(Turkey)	Yıldız, Yalın	1.85 m (6 ft 1 in)		18 – 31 January 2008
SG	13	(Turkey)	Eminoğlu, Eylem	1.94 m (6 ft 4 in)		21 – 30 August 2005
SF	19	(Turkey)	Gültekin, Yavuz (C)	2.01 m (6 ft 7 in)		26 – 17 July 2000
C	23	(United States)	Enoch, Steven	2.08 m (6 ft 10 in)		29 – 18 September 1997
G/F	24	(France)	Ouattara, Yakuba	1.92 m (6 ft 4 in)		34 – 24 January 1992
F/C	55	(Guyana)	Langevine, Cyril	2.03 m (6 ft 8 in)		28 – 16 October 1998

Head coach

- (Bosnia and Herzegovina) Nenad Marković

Assistant coach(es)

- (Turkey) Sinan Aksoylar
- (Turkey) Harun Aras Bekat
- (Turkey) Emin Serkan Ulusoy

Strength & conditioning coach(es)

- (Turkey) Oldinç Bayraktar

Legend

- (C) Team captain
- Injured

- Roster
Updated: November 13, 2026

=== Depth chart ===
Pos.	Starting 5	Bench 1	Bench 2	Bench 3
C	Steven Enoch	Cyril Langevine
PF	Yavuz Gültekin	Hakan Sayılı
SF	Rashard Kelly	Muhaymin Mustafa	Bora Tahmaz
SG	Ishmael El-Amin	Yakuba Ouattara	Eylem Eminoğlu	Xavier Munford (injured)
PG	Brianté Weber	Markel Starks	Yalın Yıldız

(colours: Turkish or homegrown players; foreign players)

=== Notable players ===
- (Turkey) Efe Aydan
- (Turkey) Hüseyin Beşok
- (Turkey) Arda Vekiloğlu
- (Turkey) Kaya Peker
- (Turkey) Şemsettin Baş
- (Turkey) Ufuk Sarıca
- (Turkey) Muratcan Güler
- (Turkey) Mehmet Yağmur
- (Turkey) - (Bosnia and Herzegovina) Asım Pars
- (Turkey) Hakan Köseoğlu
- (Turkey) Serhat Çetin
- (Turkey) Ümit Sonkol
- (Turkey) Barış Ermiş
- (Turkey) Furkan Aldemir
- (Turkey) Birkan Batuk
- (Turkey) İlkan Karaman
- (Turkey) Erkan Veyseloğlu
- (Turkey) Barış Hersek
- (Turkey) Kerem Gönlüm
- (Turkey) İnanç Koç
- (Turkey) Berk Uğurlu
- (Turkey) Metin Türen
- (Turkey) - (Nigeria) Adem Bona
- (Turkey) - (Republic of Ireland) Metecan Birsen
- (Turkey) Onuralp Bitim
- (Turkey) Semih Erden
- (Turkey) Berkan Durmaz
- (Turkey) - (Kosovo) Kenan Sipahi
- (Turkey) Muhsin Yaşar
- (Turkey) Samet Geyik
- (Colombia) Braian Angola
- (Colombia) Juan Palacios
- (Croatia) Siniša Kelečević
- (Dominican Republic) Ángel Delgado
- (Egypt) Assem Marei
- (Finland) Edon Maxhuni
- (France) Yakuba Ouattara
- (Latvia) Roberts Štelmahers
- (Lithuania) Mindaugas Kuzminskas
- (North Macedonia) Vrbica Stefanov
- (New Zealand) Thomas Abercrombie
- (Nigeria) Alade Aminu
- (Panama) Jaime Lloreda
- (Poland) Mateusz Ponitka
- (Poland) Michał Sokołowski
- (Russia) Zakhar Pashutin
- (Serbia) Jovo Stanojević
- (Serbia) Mirko Milićević
- (Uruguay) Esteban Batista
- (United States) Jim Rowinski
- (United States) Dallas Comegys
- (United States) Dewayne Jefferson
- (United States) - (Bosnia and Herzegovina) Henry Domercant
- (United States) Jerry Holman
- (United States) Roberto Bergersen
- (United States) Rashard Griffith
- (United States) Marcus Slaughter
- (United States) Sean Marshall
- (United States) Gary Neal
- (United States) - (Georgia (country)) Quinton Hosley
- (United States) Leon Williams
- (United States) Andre Smith
- (United States) David Holston
- (United States) Mire Chatman
- (United States) - (Georgia (country)) Will Thomas
- (United States) - (Cameroon) D. J. Strawberry
- (United States) - (Turkey) Ali Muhammed
- (United States) Jon Diebler
- (United States) Colton Iverson
- (United States) Kenny Gabriel
- (United States) DaJuan Summers
- (United States) - (Slovenia) Jordan Morgan
- (United States) D.J. Kennedy
- (United States) - (Tunisia) Michael Roll
- (United States) Tony Taylor
- (United States) Bonzie Colson
- (United States) Kelan Martin
- (United States) Vitto Brown
- (United States) Errick McCollum
- (United States) - (Romania) Daron Russell
- (United States) Roberto Gallinat
- (United States) Cameron Young
- (United States) Charles Manning
- (United States) Brianté Weber
- (United States) Xavier Munford

=== Award winners ===
BSL Finals MVP – Bobby Dixon: 2015
Turkish Cup Final MVP – Bobby Dixon: 2014

== Head coaches ==
- (Turkey) Aydan Siyavuş (1973–1975)
- (Turkey) Nadir Vekiloğlu (1986–1988)
- (Turkey) Aydan Siyavuş (1990–1991)
- (Turkey) Halil Üner (1993–1995)
- (Turkey) Aclan Kavasoğlu (1995–1997)
- (Turkey) Halil Üner (1997–1998)
- (Turkey) Murat Didin (1998–99)
- (Turkey) Ergin Ataman (1999)
- (Turkey) Aclan Kavasoğlu (1999–2000)
- (Turkey) Mete Babaoğlu (2000–2003)
- (Turkey) Ahmet Kandemir (2003–2006)
- (Turkey) Levent Topsakal (2006)
- (Turkey) Okan Çevik (2006–2007)
- (Turkey) Ahmet Kandemir (2007–2008)
- (Turkey) Ayhan Kalyoncu (2008–2009)
- (Turkey) Hakan Demir (2009–2012)
- (Turkey) Ufuk Sarıca (2012–2016)
- (Bosnia and Herzegovina) Nenad Marković (2016–2017)
- (Serbia) Aleksandar Trifunović (2017–2018)
- (Turkey) Özhan Çıvgın (2018–2019)
- (Germany) Dirk Bauermann (2019)
- (Turkey) Ufuk Sarıca (2019–2025)
- (Turkey) Ahmet Çakı (2025)
- (Turkey) Faruk Beşok (2025)
- (Turkey) Candost Volkan (2025–26)
- (Turkey) Ahmet Kandemir (2026)
- (Bosnia and Herzegovina) Nenad Marković (2026–present)

== Season by season ==
Season	Tier	Division	Pos.	Playoffs	Cup Competitions	European Competitions	
1966–67	1	TBL	12th	–			
1967–68	1	TBL	15th	–			
1968–74	Lower divisions						
1974–75	1	TBL	3rd	–			
1975–76	1	TBL	3rd	–		Korać Cup	
1976–77	1	TBL	6th	–		Korać Cup	
1977–78	1	TBL	5th	–			
1978–79	1	TBL	3rd	–		Korać Cup	
1979–80	1	TBL	5th	–		Korać Cup	
1980–81	1	TBL	3rd	4th		Korać Cup	
1981–82	1	TBL	7th	6th		Korać Cup	
1982–83	1	TBL	6th			Korać Cup	
1983–84	1	TBL	4th	RU			
1984–85	1	TBL	6th	QF		Saporta Cup	
1985–86	1	TBL	7th	QF			
1986–87	1	TBL	2nd	Champions		Korać Cup	
1987–88	1	TBL	9th			European Champions Cup	
1988–89	1	TBL	10th				
1989–90	1	TBL	9th				
1990–91	1	TBL	7th	QF			
1991–92	1	TBL	11th				
1992–93	1	TBL	14th				
1993–94	1	TBL	9th	1R			
1994–95	1	TBL	10th	1R			
1995–96	1	TBL	12th	1R			
1996–97	1	TBL	10th	1R			
1997–98	1	TBL	12th	1R			
1998–99	1	TBL	9th	1R			
1999–00	1	TBL	4th	QF	Quarterfinalist	Korać Cup	3R
2000–01	1	TBL	10th	1R		Saporta Cup	RS
2001–02	1	TBL	6th	QF			
2002–03	1	TBL	5th	QF		FIBA Europe Champions Cup	RS
2003–04	1	TBL	4th	SF	Group Stage		
2004–05	1	TBL	5th	QF	Runner-up		
2005–06	1	TBL	10th		Group Stage		
2006–07	1	TBL	12th		Semifinalist		
2007–08	1	TBL	7th	QF	Quarterfinalist		
2008–09	1	TBL	9th		Group Stage		
2009–10	1	TBL	6th	QF	Quarterfinalist		
2010–11	1	TBL	5th	QF	Group Stage	EuroChallenge	QF
2011–12	1	TBL	6th	QF	Group Stage	EuroChallenge	T16
2012–13	1	TBL	5th	SF	Quarterfinalist	EuroChallenge	RU
2013–14	1	TBL	6th	SF	Champion	Eurocup	L32
2014–15	1	TBL	4th	Champions	Semifinalist	Eurocup	QF
2015–16	1	BSL	6th	QF	Semifinalist	Euroleague; Eurocup	RS; L16
2016–17	1	BSL	9th		Semifinalist	Champions League	QF
2017–18	1	BSL	10th			Champions League	QF
2018–19	1	BSL	11th			FIBA Europa Cup	QF
2019–20	1	BSL	2nd^{1}	–^{1}		FIBA Europa Cup	SF^{1}
2020–21	1	BSL	3rd	SF		Champions League	RU
2021–22	1	BSL	7th	QF	Quarterfinalist	Champions League	PI
2022–23	1	BSL	4th	RU		Champions League	PI
2023–24	1	BSL	4th	SF	Semifinalist	Champions League	R16
2024–25	1	BSL	14th		Quarterfinalist	Champions League	PI
2025–26	1	BSL	14th				

^1 Cancelled due to the COVID-19 pandemic in Europe.

== See also ==
- Karşıyaka S.K.
- Karşıyaka Women's Volleyball Team
