= Nasaş G.S.K. =

Nasaş
- Founded: 1975
- Dissolved: 1993
- History: 1975–1993
- Arena: İzmit Atatürk Spor Salonu
- Capacity: 1,620
- Location: İzmit, Kocaeli, Turkey
- Team colors: Red, green
- President: Fethi Ağalar
- Team manager: Yiğiter Uluğ
- Head coach: Necati Güler
Home	Away

Nasaş Gençlik ve Spor Kulübü (in English: Nasaş Youth and Sports Club), commonly known as Nasaş or Nasaşspor is a defunct professional basketball club that was based in İzmit, Turkey. The club competed in the Turkish Basketball League and was playing its home games at the İzmit Atatürk Spor Salonu.

== History ==
Nasaşspor was founded in 1975 as the professional basketball department of Nasaş Alüminyum Sanayii ve Ticaret A.Ş. (Nasaş Aluminium Industry and Trade Co.) which operated from 1969 to 1993 as industrial companies. On July 7, 1993, as a result of the lawsuit filed by the creditor banks were given for Nasaş industry bankruptcy, Nasaşspor bearing the company's name was taken over by Ülker.

== Titles & achievements ==
Turkish Cup

- Runners-up (2): 1991–92, 1992–93
