= 2006–07 Turkish Basketball League =

Basketball league in Turkey

Turkish Basketball League
- Season: 2006–07
- TV partner(s): Lig TV

Regular season
- Relegated: Tofaş, Tekelspor

Finals
- Champions: Fenerbahçe Ülker (2nd title)
- Runners-up: Efes Pilsen
- Semifinalists: Türk Telekom, Galatasaray Café Crown

Statistical leaders
Points	Gerald Fitch	19.7
Rebounds	Ömer Aşık	11.2
Assists	Marques Green	6.8

Records
- Attendance: 412,963
- Average attendance: 1,582

The 2006–07 Turkish Basketball League was the 41st season of the top-tier professional basketball league in Turkey. The season started on October 7, 2006. Fenerbahçe Ülker won their second national championship this season.

== Regular season standings ==
Last updated June 30, 2007

Clinched play-off berth
Season over
Relegated

Pos	Club	Pld	W	L	PF	PA	Pts
1	Fenerbahçe Ülker	30	28	2	2457	2046	58
2	Efes Pilsen	30	27	3	2378	1934	57
3	Türk Telekom	30	25	5	2408	2076	55
4	Galatasaray Café Crown	30	18	12	2185	2172	48
5	Beşiktaş Cola Turka	30	17	13	2266	2179	47
6	Casa TED Kolejliler	30	17	13	2309	2270	47
7	Bandırma Banvit	30	15	15	2249	2168	45
8	Darüşşafaka	30	14	16	2237	2259	44
9	Mersin BŞB.	30	13	17	2196	2278	43
10	Mutlu Akü Selçuk Üni.	30	12	18	2317	2358	42
11	Alpella	30	12	18	2028	2199	42
12	Pınar Karşıyaka	30	12	18	2223	2294	42
13	Oyak Renault	30	9	21	2043	2237	39
14	Beykozspor	30	9	21	2147	2381	39
15	Tofaş	30	9	21	2036	2216	39
16	Tekelspor	30	3	27	1939	2351	33

Tofaş and Tekelspor relegated to Turkish Second Basketball League. Antalya BŞB and Kepez Belediye will play in Turkish Basketball League in 2007–08 season.

== Turkish Basketball League 2006–07 play-offs ==
Last updated June 4, 2008

The 2007 Turkish Basketball League play-offs is the final phase of the 2006–07 regular season.

Quarterfinal and Semifinal series are 5-match series. The teams reaches the first 3 wins is through to the next round. The team which has won both regular season matchups starts with a 1–0 lead to the series.

Final series are 7-match series and the team reaches first 4 wins is the champion of the Turkish Basketball League.

Quarter Finals
1	Fenerbahçe Ülker	3
8	Darüşşafaka	1
4	Galatasaray Café Crown	3
5	Beşiktaş Cola Turka	0
2	Efes Pilsen	3
7	Bandırma Banvit	0
3	Türk Telekom	3
6	Casa TED Kolejliler	1

SemiFinals
1	Fenerbahçe Ülker	3
4	Galatasaray Café Crown	0
2	Efes Pisen	3
3	Türk Telekom	1

Finals
1	Fenerbahçe Ülker	4
2	Efes Pilsen	0

Turkish Basketball League
2006–07 Champion
Fenerbahçe Ülker
Second Title

== 2006/2007 play-off seedings, results, and schedules ==
=== Quarter finals ===
May 4–10, 2007

==== Fenerbahçe Ülker (28–2) – Darüşşafaka (14–16) ====
May 5
14:00 Series are tied 1–1.

(BoxSc.)

Fenerbahçe Ülker	74–82	Darüşşafaka
Scoring by quarter: 24–22, 15–23, 19–15, 16–22
Pts: W.Solomon (United States) 23; Rebs: Mirsad (Turkey) 5 Asts: W.Solomon (United States) 5		Pts: Polat (Turkey) 21; Rebs: Polat (Turkey) 5 Asts: Mike Jones (United States) 6

Abdi İpekçi, Istanbul
Attendance: –

May 8
18:30 Fenerbahçe leads series 2–1.

(BoxSc.)

Darüşşafaka	71–75	Fenerbahçe Ülker
Scoring by quarter: 17–14, 15–16, 13–27, 26–18
Pts: Erdem (Turkey) 18; Rebs: Polat (Turkey) 6 Asts: Soner (Turkey) 4		Pts: W.Solomon (United States) 27; Rebs: Mirsad (Turkey) 12; Asts: W.Solomon (United States) 5

Ayhan Şahenk, Istanbul
Attendance: –

May 10
19:00 Fenerbahçe wins the series 3–1.

(BoxSc.)

Darüşşafaka	72–90	Fenerbahçe Ülker
Scoring by quarter: 18–19, 15–23, 15–27, 24–21
Pts: Mike Jones (United States) 16; Rebs: Mike Jones (United States) 7 Asts: H.Dobie (United States) 7		Pts: Mirsad (Turkey) 20; Rebs: Mirsad (Turkey) 11; Asts: W.Solomon (United States) 5

Ayhan Şahenk, Istanbul
Attendance: –

==== Efes Pilsen (27–3) – Bandırma Banvit(15–15) ====
May 5
17:00 Efes Pilsen leads series 2–0.

(BoxSc.)

Efes Pilsen	85–63	Bandırma Banvit
Scoring by quarter: 30–18, 13–17, 26–20, 16–8
Pts: D.Nicholas (United States) 18; Rebs: Kerem G. (Turkey) 9 Asts: D.Nicholas (United States) 11		Pts: A.Long (United States) 24; Rebs: A.Long (United States) 9 Asts: M.Perry (United States) 6

Abdi İpekçi, Istanbul
Attendance: –

May 8
19:00 Efes Pilsen wins series 3–0.

(BoxSc.)

Bandırma Banvit	84–91	Efes Pilsen
Scoring by quarter: 23–26, 20–25, 17–18, 24–22
Pts: M.Perry (United States) 24; Rebs: A.Long (United States) 9 Asts: M.Perry (United States) 4		Pts: D.Nicholas (United States) 26; Rebs: M.Haislip (United States) 8 Asts: D.Nicholas (United States) 8

Kara Ali Acar, Bandırma
Attendance: –

==== Türk Telekom (25–5) – Casa TED Kolejliler (17–13) ====
May 4
19:00 Türk Telekom leads series 2–0.

(BoxSc.)

Türk Telekom	86–78	Casa TED Kolejliler
Scoring by quarter: 39–18, 11–16, 10–20, 26–24
Pts: Tutku (Turkey) 32; Rebs: D.Alston (United States) 10; Asts: Tutku (Turkey) 4		Pts: A.Jensen (United States) 19; Rebs: A.Jensen (United States) 13; Asts: M.Green (United States) 9

Atatürk, Ankara
Attendance: –

May 7
19:00 Türk Telekom leads series 2–1.

(BoxSc.)

Casa TED Kolejliler	83–75	Türk Telekom
Scoring by quarter: 18–14, 18–17, 21–23, 26–21
Pts: R.Shields (United States) 22; Rebs: E.Davis (United States) 8 Asts: M.Green (United States) 11		Pts: D.Alston (United States) 18; Rebs: E.Dudley (United States) 8 Asts: Tutku (Turkey) 4

Atatürk, Ankara
Attendance: –

May 9
19:00 Türk Telekom wins the series 3–1.

(BoxSc.)

Casa TED Kolejliler	74–79	Türk Telekom
Scoring by quarter: 24–19, 18–15, 11–25, 21–20
Pts: E.Davis (United States) 19; Rebs: A.Jensen (United States) 8 Asts: M.Green (United States) 5		Pts: Haluk (Turkey) 19; Rebs: E.Dudley (United States) 9 Asts: Haluk (Turkey) 4

Atatürk, Ankara
Attendance: –

==== Galatasaray (18–12) – Beşiktaş Cola Turka (17–13) ====
May 4
20:00 Galatasaray leads the series 1–0.

(BoxSc.)

Galatasaray Café Crown	83–65	Beşiktaş Cola Turka
Scoring by quarter: 17–9, 28–22, 27–17, 11–17
Pts: G.Fitch (United States) 27; Rebs: Cemal (Turkey) 8 Asts: G.Fitch (United States) 2		Pts: Erkan V. (Turkey) 13; Rebs: McFarlin (United States) 6 Asts: Erkan V. (Turkey) 6

Ahmet Cömert SH, Istanbul
Attendance: –

May 6
15:00 Galatasaray leads the series 2–0.

(BoxSc.)

Galatasaray Café Crown	80–73	Beşiktaş Cola Turka
Scoring by quarter: 18–22, 22–15, 21–11, 19–25
Pts: D.Mitchell (United States) 22; Rebs: G.Fitch (United States) 6 Asts: D.Mitchell (United States) 4		Pts: Erdal Bibo (Turkey) 23; Rebs: Cevher (Turkey) 10; Asts: Barış Ö. (Turkey) 8

Ahmet Cömert SH, Istanbul
Attendance: –

May 8
18:30 Galatasaray wins the series 3–0.

(BoxSc.)

Beşiktaş Cola Turka	81–89	Galatasaray Café Crown
Scoring by quarter: 27–19, 17–25, 19–23, 18–22
Pts: Barış Ö. (Turkey) 24; Rebs: Levent B. (Turkey) 8 Asts: Cevher (Turkey) 3		Pts: J.Graves (United States) 22; Rebs: D.Brown (Canada) 6 Asts: D.Mitchell (United States) 8

Akatlar Arena, Istanbul
Attendance: –

=== Semifinals ===
May 13–21, 2007

==== Fenerbahçe Ülker (28–2) – Galatasaray Café Crown (18–12) ====
May 14
20:00 Fenerbahçe Ülker leads series 2–0.

(BoxSc.)

Fenerbahçe Ülker	76–70	Galatasaray Café Crown
Scoring by quarter: 18–16, 14–15, 22–22, 22–17
Pts: W.Solomon (United States) 20; Rebs: Mirsad (Turkey) 9 Asts: W.Solomon (United States) 6		Pts: G.Fitch (United States) 22; Rebs: J.Graves (United States) 9 Asts: D.Mitchell (United States) 7

Abdi İpekçi, Istanbul
Attendance: –

May 18
20:00 Fenerbahçe Ülker wins series 3–0.

(BoxSc.)

Galatasaray Café Crown	64–69	Fenerbahçe Ülker
Scoring by quarter: 11–20, 23–19, 12–21, 18–9
Pts: Tolga (Turkey) 14; Rebs: Fatih (Turkey) 8 Asts: G.Fitch (United States) 4		Pts: Ömer Onan (Turkey) 19; Rebs: Mirsad (Turkey) 8 Asts: W.Solomon (United States) 5

Ahmet Cömert SH, Istanbul
Attendance: –

=== 2006/2007 League Finals ===
May 25 – June 1, 2007
