= Ülker G.S.K. =

Ülker
- Founded: 1993
- Dissolved: 2006
- History: Ülker G.S.K. 1993–2006
- Arena: Abdi İpekçi Arena
- Capacity: 12,270
- Location: Istanbul, Turkey
- Team colors: Orange, White, Green
- Championships: 4 Turkish Championships; 3 Turkish Cups; 6 Presidential Cups
Home	Away

Ülker Gençlik ve Spor Kulübü, commonly known as Ülker or Ülkerspor, was a Turkish professional basketball club that was based in Istanbul, Turkey. The club competed in the Turkish Basketball League. They played their home games at the Abdi İpekçi Arena.

== History ==
Ülkerspor was founded in 1975, but its basketball department was created in 1993, by buying a Turkish Super League spot from Nasaş. The club have won four Turkish League titles in 1995, 1998, 2001, and 2006, with greats including Harun Erdenay, İbrahim Kutluay, Michael Anderson, Orhun Ene, Kevin Rankin, and more recently, Mirsad Türkcan and Serkan Erdoğan. The first major success for the club was in the 1995–96 FIBA European League when Ülker managed to reach the Quarterfinal Playoffs and was eliminated by FC Barcelona (the subsequent competition's finalist). Ülker also made the EuroLeague Top 16 for five consecutive seasons between 2002 and 2006, beating all the best European teams in the process, and showing it was an important team in the competition.

Ülkerspor had its best finish when surviving a tough Top 16 group to make the Euroleague 2004–05 season Quarterfinal Playoffs, where it lost against CSKA Moscow. Ülkerspor also won five Turkish Presidential Cup titles and three Turkish Cup titles between 2001 and 2005. Things got serious again in the 2005–06 season, as Ülkerspor conquered its fourth Turkish League title.

In 2006, the Ülker corporation, which owned and sponsored the club, decided to abolished the team, converting it into the humble Alpella club. Instead, Ulker sponsored the Turkish club Fenerbahçe, Murat Ülker's favourite team. Fenerbahçe then became known as Fenerbahçe Ülker and got Ulkerspor's spot in the Euroleague.

Alpella played for two seasons in the Turkish Basketball League, in the 2006–07 and 2007–08 seasons. Finally, its league rights were bought by Trabzonspor, after the club was relegated down to the TB2L, following the 2007–08 season.

== Notable players ==
Note: Flags indicate national team eligibility at FIBA-sanctioned events. Players may hold other non-FIBA nationalities not displayed.

Criteria

To appear in this section a player must have either:

- Set a club record or won an individual award while at the club
- Played at least one official international match for their national team at any time
- Played at least one official NBA match at any time.

Turkey

- Harun Erdenay 9 seasons: '94–'03
- Orhun Ene 4 seasons: '93–'97
- Mirsad Türkcan 1 season: '05–'06
- İbrahim Kutluay 2 seasons: '03–'04, '05–'06
- Ufuk Sarıca 2 seasons: '99–'01
- Serkan Erdoğan 5 seasons: '00–'05
- Ömer Onan 1 season: '05–'06
- Asım Pars 3 seasons: '96–'98, '01–'02
- Haluk Yıldırım 11 seasons: '93–'04
- Kerem Tunçeri 1 season: '04–'05
- Kerem Gönlüm 6 seasons: '99–'05
- Ersan İlyasova 1 season: '04–'05

United States

- Tanoka Beard 1 season: '94–'95
- Charles Shackleford 1 season: '95–'96
- Thomas Jordan 1 season: '95–'96
- Sean Higgins 1 season: '96–'97
- Kevin Rankin 4 seasons: '96–'00
- Michael Anderson 2 seasons: '97–'99
- Jerome Allen 2 seasons: '99–'00
- Mark Pope 1 season: '99–'00
- Melvin Booker 2 seasons: '02–'04
- Joseph Blair 2 seasons: '02–'04
- Ashraf Amaya 1 season: '03–'04
- Jeff Trepagnier 1 season: '05–'06
- Marcus Haislip 1 season: '05–'06

Georgia

- Zaza Pachulia 4 seasons: '99–'03

Greece

- Efthimios Rentzias 1 season: '03–'04

(North Macedonia) Republic of Macedonia

- Petar Naumoski 1 season: '03–'04

Latvia

- Roberts Štelmahers 1 season: '01–'02

Lithuania

- Saulius Štombergas 1 season: '04–'05
- Eurelijus Žukauskas 1 season: '04–'05
- Virginijus Praškevičius 2 seasons: '02–'03, '04–'05

== Honours ==
=== Domestic competitions ===
- Turkish Super League

Winners (4): 1994–95, 1997–98, 2000–01, 2005–06
Runners-up (5): 1993–94, 1995–96, 2001–02, 2002–03, 2003–04

- Turkish Cup

Winners (3): 2002–03, 2003–04, 2004–05
Runners-up (2): 1999–00, 2005–06

- Presidential Cup

Winners (6): 1995, 2001, 2002, 2003, 2004, 2005
Runners-up (2): 1998, 2000

=== Other competitions ===
- FIBA International Christmas Tournament (defunct)

Runners-up (1): 2003

== See also ==
- Alpella S.K.
