= Basketbol Süper Ligi =

Top men's basketball league in Turkey

Türkiye Sigorta Basketbol Süper Ligi
- Founded: 1966; 60 years ago
- First season: 1966–67
- Country: Turkey
- Federation: Turkish Federation
- Confederation: FIBA Europe
- Number of teams: 16
- Level on pyramid: 1
- Relegation to: TBL
- Domestic cup: Turkish Cup
- Supercup: Presidential Cup
- International cup(s): EuroLeague; EuroCup; Champions League; Europe Cup
- Current champions: Fenerbahçe Beko (13th title)
- Most championships: Anadolu Efes (16 titles)
- TV partners: beIN Sports
- Website: tbf.org.tr
- 2026–27 Basketbol Süper Ligi season

The Basketball Super League (Turkish: Basketbol Süper Ligi; BSL), also known as the Türkiye Sigorta Basketbol Süper Ligi for sponsorship reasons, is the top men's professional basketball division of the Turkish basketball league system. It replaced the former Turkish Basketball Championship (1946–1967) to become the Turkish Basketball League (TBL) until 2015 when it adopted its current name while the TBL name became exclusive to the second-tier and third-tier divisions.

The BSL is administered by the Turkish Basketball Federation (TBF) and is contested by 16 teams, with the two lowest-placed teams relegated to the second-tier TBL and replaced by the top two teams of that division.

Since the league's restructuring in 1966, 11 clubs have been crowned champions, with Anadolu Efes winning the title a record 16 times and Fenerbahçe 13 times. In recent years, Fenerbahçe won 12 titles out of 19 from the 2006–07 season onward.

== History ==
According to official records, basketball was first played in Turkey in 1904 at Robert College. An American physical education teacher laid the foundations of the sport in the country.

Until late 1966, local basketball competitions were held in major cities like Istanbul (which hosted the Istanbul League), Ankara, and İzmir. There was also the former Turkish Championship which existed from 1946 to 1967.

The current Turkish top-tier level national league was founded in 1966, by the Turkish Basketball Federation, and began with the 1966–67 season, and it thus replaced those earlier competitions. The Turkish second-tier level league, the TBL (previously known as the TB2L), was also founded three years later in 1969, and since 2011, a third-tier level league TB2L, with the teams divided into two groups.

On 6 March 1988, Erman Kunter, of Fenerbahce Istanbul scored 153 pts against Hilalspor Izmir (92 in 2nd half), a record for a club competition worldwide.

== Format ==
There are 16 teams in the league, and they play against each other twice, under a league system format, once at their home and the other away. At the end of the season, the top eight teams are entitled to participate in the league's playoffs. The winner of the playoffs is crowned the Turkish champion. The two top teams of the Turkish Second League are promoted to the top level Basketbol Süper Ligi. The two lowest-placed teams of the league are relegated.

== Performance by club ==
Clubs in bold currently play in the top division.

Club	Winners	Runners-up	Years won
**Anadolu Efes**	16	14	1979, 1983, 1984, 1992, 1993, 1994, 1996, 1997, 2002, 2003, 2004, 2005, 2009, 2019, 2021, 2023
**Fenerbahçe**	13	10	1991, 2007, 2008, 2010, 2011, 2014, 2016, 2017, 2018, 2022, 2024, 2025, 2026
Eczacıbaşı	8	1	1976, 1977, 1978, 1980, 1981, 1982, 1988, 1989
**Galatasaray**	5	5	1969, 1985, 1986, 1990, 2013
İTÜ	5	1	1968, 1970, 1971, 1972, 1973
Ülker	4	5	1995, 1998, 2001, 2006
**Beşiktaş**	2	9	1975, 2012
**Tofaş**	2	3	1999, 2000
**Karşıyaka**	2	2	1987, 2015
Altınordu	1	—	1967
Muhafızgücü	1	—	1974
Çukurova Sanayi	—	2	
Paşabahçe	—	2	
Şekerspor	—	2	
**Türk Telekom**	—	2	
Bandırma Basketbol	—	1	

== Current clubs ==
Locations of the 2025–26 Basketbol Süper Ligi clubs
Istanbul Basketbol Süper Ligi clubs

Team	Location	Stadium	Capacity
Anadolu Efes	Istanbul (Zeytinburnu)	Basketbol Gelişim Merkezi	10,000
Bahçeşehir Koleji	Istanbul (Bakırköy)	Sinan Erdem Spor Salonu	16,000
Beşiktaş	Istanbul (Beşiktaş)	Akatlar Arena	3,200
Biotekno Körfez Basket	Kocaeli	Şehit Polis Recep Topaloğlu Sports Hall	5,000
Bursaspor Basketbol	Bursa	Tofaş Nilüfer Sports Hall	7,500
Çayırova Belediyespor	Kocaeli (Çayırova)	Çayırova Spor Salonu	1,000
Fenerbahçe Tarfin	Istanbul (Ataşehir)	Ülker Sports Arena	13,800
Galatasaray MCT Technic	Istanbul (Bakırköy)	Sinan Erdem Spor Salonu	16,000
Karşıyaka Basket	İzmir (Karşıyaka)	Mustafa Kemal Atatürk spor salonu	5,000
Petkim Spor	İzmir (Aliağa)	Aliağa Belediyesi ENKA Spor Salonu	3,000
Pizzabulls Bandırma Bordo	Balıkesir (Bandırma)	Bandırma 17 Eylül Üniversitesi Spor Salonu	2,000
Safiport Erokspor	Istanbul (Esenler)	Sinan Erdem Spor Salonu	16,000
Tofaş	Bursa	Tofaş Nilüfer Sports Hall	7,500
Trabzonspor	Trabzon	Hayri Gür Arena	7,500
Türk Telekom	Ankara	Ankara Arena	10,400
Yukatel Denizli Basket	Denizli	Pamukkale University Arena	3,490

== Title holders ==
The winners of the former Turkish Basketball Championship (1946–1967) are not included, only the clubs winning the Basketbol Süper Ligi since its inception in 1966.

- 1966–67: Altınordu
- 1967–68: İTÜ
- 1968–69: Galatasaray
- 1969–70: İTÜ
- 1970–71: İTÜ
- 1971–72: İTÜ
- 1972–73: İTÜ
- 1973–74: Muhafızgücü
- 1974–75: Beşiktaş
- 1975–76: Eczacıbaşı
- 1976–77: Eczacıbaşı
- 1977–78: Eczacıbaşı
- 1978–79: Efes Pilsen
- 1979–80: Eczacıbaşı
- 1980–81: Eczacıbaşı
- 1981–82: Eczacıbaşı
- 1982–83: Efes Pilsen
- 1983–84: Efes Pilsen
- 1984–85: Galatasaray
- 1985–86: Galatasaray
- 1986–87: Karşıyaka
- 1987–88: Eczacıbaşı
- 1988–89: Eczacıbaşı
- 1989–90: Galatasaray
- 1990–91: Fenerbahçe
- 1991–92: Efes Pilsen
- 1992–93: Efes Pilsen
- 1993–94: Efes Pilsen
- 1994–95: Ülker
- 1995–96: Efes Pilsen
- 1996–97: Efes Pilsen
- 1997–98: Ülker
- 1998–99: Tofaş
- 1999–00: Tofaş
- 2000–01: Ülker
- 2001–02: Efes Pilsen
- 2002–03: Efes Pilsen
- 2003–04: Efes Pilsen
- 2004–05: Efes Pilsen
- 2005–06: Ülker
- 2006–07: Fenerbahçe Ülker
- 2007–08: Fenerbahçe Ülker
- 2008–09: Efes Pilsen
- 2009–10: Fenerbahçe Ülker
- 2010–11: Fenerbahçe Ülker
- 2011–12: Beşiktaş Milangaz
- 2012–13: Galatasaray Medical Park
- 2013–14: Fenerbahçe Ülker
- 2014–15: Pınar Karşıyaka
- 2015–16: Fenerbahçe
- 2016–17: Fenerbahçe
- 2017–18: Fenerbahçe Doğuş
- 2018–19: Anadolu Efes
- 2019–20: Cancelled due to the COVID-19
- 2020–21: Anadolu Efes
- 2021–22: Fenerbahçe Beko
- 2022–23: Anadolu Efes
- 2023–24: Fenerbahçe Beko
- 2024–25: Fenerbahçe Beko
- 2025–26: Fenerbahçe Beko

== List of champions ==
=== Pre-playoffs era ===
Season	Champions	Runners-up
1966–67	Altınordu	Galatasaray
1967–68	İTÜ	Fenerbahçe
1968–69	Galatasaray	İTÜ
1969–70	İTÜ	Fenerbahçe
1970–71	İTÜ	Fenerbahçe
1971–72	İTÜ	Beşiktaş
1972–73	İTÜ	Şekerspor
1973–74	Muhafızgücü	Şekerspor
1974–75	Beşiktaş	Galatasaray
1975–76	Eczacıbaşı	Beşiktaş
1976–77	Eczacıbaşı	Beşiktaş
1977–78	Eczacıbaşı	Tofaş
1978–79	Efes Pilsen	Eczacıbaşı
1979–80	Eczacıbaşı	Efes Pilsen
1980–81	Eczacıbaşı	Beşiktaş
1981–82	Eczacıbaşı	Beşiktaş
1982–83	Efes Pilsen	Fenerbahçe

=== Playoffs era ===
Season	Home court advantage	Result	Home court disadvantage	Regular season leader	Record
1983–84	**Efes Pilsen**	2–1	Karşıyaka	Eczacıbaşı	18–4
1984–85	Fenerbahçe	1–2	**Galatasaray**	Fenerbahçe	20–2
1985–86	Efes Pilsen	1–2	**Galatasaray**	Efes Pilsen	16–5
1986–87	**Karşıyaka**	2–1	Galatasaray	Beşiktaş	15–7
1987–88	Çukurova Sanayi	1–3	**Eczacıbaşı**	Fenerbahçe	17–5
1988–89	**Eczacıbaşı**	3–1	Çukurova Sanayi	Eczacıbaşı	14–7
1989–90	**Galatasaray**	3–1	Paşabahçe	Fenerbahçe	19–3
1990–91	**Fenerbahçe**	3–2	Tofaş SAS	Fenerbahçe	20–2
1991–92	Paşabahçe	1–3	**Efes Pilsen**	Fenerbahçe	23–3
1992–93	**Efes Pilsen**	4–0	Fenerbahçe	Efes Pilsen	30–0
1993–94	**Efes Pilsen**	4–2	Ülkerspor	PTT	27–3
1994–95	**Ülkerspor**	4–2	Fenerbahçe	Efes Pilsen	28–2
1995–96	**Efes Pilsen**	4–0	Ülkerspor	Efes Pilsen	28–2
1996–97	**Efes Pilsen**	4–1	Türk Telekom PTT	Efes Pilsen	27–3
1997–98	Efes Pilsen	2–4	**Ülkerspor**	Efes Pilsen	26–4
1998–99	**Tofaş**	4–2	Efes Pilsen	Tofaş	23–5
1999–00	Efes Pilsen	1–4	**Tofaş**	Efes Pilsen	21–5
2000–01	**Ülkerspor**	4–2	Efes Pilsen	Ülkerspor	22–4
2001–02	**Efes Pilsen**	4–2	Ülkerspor	Efes Pilsen	20–2
2002–03	Ülkerspor	3–4	**Efes Pilsen**	Ülkerspor	25–1
2003–04	**Efes Pilsen**	4–2	Ülkerspor	Efes Pilsen	22–4
2004–05	**Efes Pilsen**	4–1	Beşiktaş	Efes Pilsen	24–2
2005–06	**Ülkerspor**	4–0	Efes Pilsen	Ülkerspor	25–5
2006–07	**Fenerbahçe Ülker**	4–0	Efes Pilsen	Fenerbahçe Ülker	28–2
2007–08	**Fenerbahçe Ülker**	4–1	Türk Telekom	Beşiktaş Cola Turka	24–6
2008–09	**Efes Pilsen**	4–2	Fenerbahçe Ülker	Efes Pilsen	28–2
2009–10	Efes Pilsen	2–4	**Fenerbahçe Ülker**	Efes Pilsen	27–3
2010–11	**Fenerbahçe Ülker**	4–2	Galatasaray Cafe Crown	Fenerbahçe Ülker	27–3
2011–12	Anadolu Efes	2–4	**Beşiktaş Milangaz**	Galatasaray Medical Park	25–5
2012–13	**Galatasaray Medical Park**	4–1	Banvit	Galatasaray Medical Park	27–3
2013–14	**Fenerbahçe Ülker**	4–3	Galatasaray Liv Hospital	Banvit	28–2
2014–15	Anadolu Efes	1–4	**Pınar Karşıyaka**	Fenerbahçe Ülker	23–7
2015–16	Anadolu Efes	2–4	**Fenerbahçe**	Anadolu Efes	24–6
2016–17	**Fenerbahçe**	4–0	Beşiktaş Sompo Japan	Fenerbahçe	28–2
2017–18	**Fenerbahçe Doğuş**	4–1	Tofaş	Fenerbahçe Doğuş	27–3
2018–19	**Anadolu Efes**	4–3	Fenerbahçe Beko	Anadolu Efes	25–3
2019–20	Season was cancelled due to the coronavirus pandemic in Turkey.				
2020–21	**Anadolu Efes**	3–0	Fenerbahçe Beko	Anadolu Efes	29–1
2021–22	**Fenerbahçe Beko**	3–1	Anadolu Efes	Fenerbahçe Beko	24–6
2022–23	**Anadolu Efes**	3–0	Pınar Karşıyaka	Türk Telekom	25–5
2023–24	Anadolu Efes	1–3	**Fenerbahçe Beko**	Anadolu Efes	25–5
2024–25	**Fenerbahçe Beko**	4–1	Beşiktaş	Fenerbahçe Beko	27–3
2025–26	**Fenerbahçe Beko**	3–1	Beşiktaş	Fenerbahçe Beko	27–3

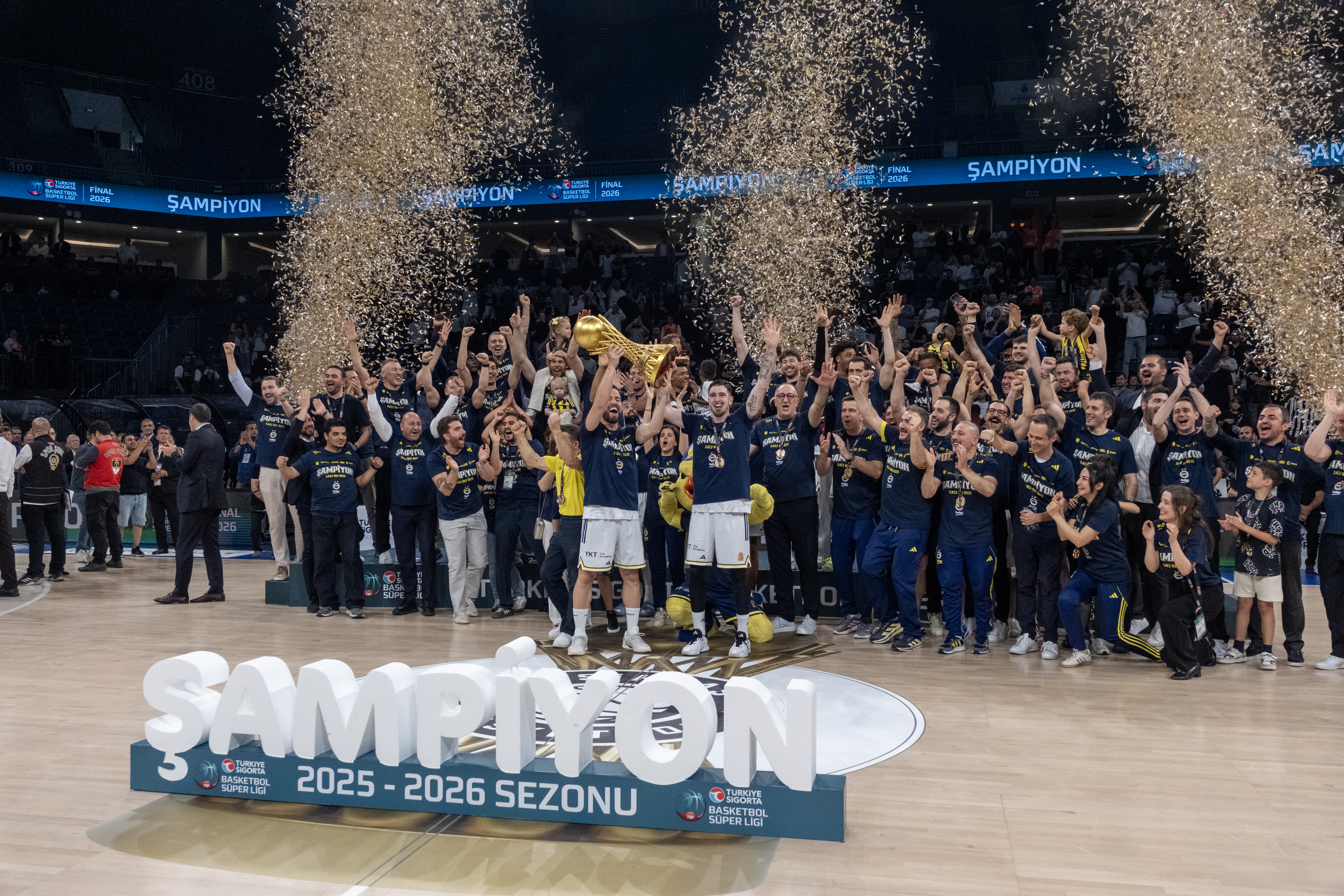
Fenerbahçe 2025–26 Basketbol Süper Ligi championship ceremony

== Finals MVPs and winner coaches ==
Note: Flags indicate national team eligibility at FIBA-sanctioned events. Players may hold other non-FIBA nationalities not displayed.

Season	Finals MVP	Champion's Coach
1966–67	—N/a	(Turkey) Samim Göreç
1967–68	—N/a	(Turkey) Mehmet Baturalp
1968–69	—N/a	(Bulgaria) Petar Simenov
1969–70	—N/a	(Turkey) Mehmet Baturalp
1970–71	—N/a	(Turkey) Şengün Kaplanoğlu
1971–72	—N/a	(Turkey) Samim Göreç
1972–73	—N/a	(Turkey) Öner Şaylan
1973–74	—N/a	(Turkey) Armağan Asena
1974–75	—N/a	(Turkey) Cavit Altunay
1975–76	—N/a	(Turkey) Aydan Siyavuş
1976–77	—N/a	(Turkey) Aydan Siyavuş
1977–78	—N/a	(Turkey) Aydan Siyavuş
1978–79	—N/a	(Turkey) Faruk Akagün
1979–80	—N/a	(Turkey) Aydan Siyavuş
1980–81	—N/a	(Turkey) Aydan Siyavuş
1981–82	—N/a	(Turkey) Aydan Siyavuş
1982–83	—N/a	(Turkey) Rıza Erverdi
1983–84	—N/a	(Turkey) Aydan Siyavuş
1984–85	—N/a	(Turkey) Nur Germen
1985–86	—N/a	(Turkey) Fehmi Sadıkoğlu
1986–87	—N/a	(Turkey) Nadir Vekiloğlu
1987–88	—N/a	(Turkey) Mehmet Baturalp
1988–89	—N/a	(Turkey) Mehmet Baturalp
1989–90	—N/a	(Turkey) Faruk Akagün
1990–91	—N/a	(Turkey) Çetin Yılmaz
1991–92	—N/a	(Turkey) Aydın Örs
1992–93	—N/a	(Turkey) Aydın Örs
1993–94	—N/a	(Turkey) Aydın Örs
1994–95	—N/a	(Turkey) Çetin Yılmaz
1995–96	—N/a	(Turkey) Aydın Örs
1996–97	—N/a	(Turkey) Aydın Örs
1997–98	—N/a	(Turkey) Çetin Yılmaz
1998–99	—N/a	(Croatia) Jasmin Repeša
1999–00	—N/a	(Turkey) Tolga Öngören
2000–01	—N/a	(Turkey) Murat Didin
2001–02	—N/a	(Turkey) Oktay Mahmuti
2002–03	—N/a	(Turkey) Oktay Mahmuti
2003–04	—N/a	(Turkey) Oktay Mahmuti
2004–05	—N/a	(Turkey) Oktay Mahmuti
2005–06	—N/a	(Turkey) Murat Özyer
2006–07	—N/a	(Turkey) Aydın Örs
2007–08	—N/a	(Montenegro) Bogdan Tanjević
2008–09	(United States) Bootsy Thornton	(Turkey) Ergin Ataman
2009–10	(United States) Tarence Kinsey	(Turkey) Ertuğrul Erdoğan
2010–11	(Turkey) Oğuz Savaş	(Croatia) Neven Spahija
2011–12	(Puerto Rico) Carlos Arroyo	(Turkey) Ergin Ataman
2012–13	(United States) Jamont Gordon	(Turkey) Ergin Ataman
2013–14	Not awarded	(Serbia) Željko Obradović
2014–15	(Turkey) Bobby Dixon	(Turkey) Ufuk Sarıca
2015–16	(Italy) Luigi Datome	(Serbia) Željko Obradović
2016–17	(Serbia) Bogdan Bogdanović	(Serbia) Željko Obradović
2017–18	(United States) Brad Wanamaker	(Serbia) Željko Obradović
2018–19	(United States) Shane Larkin	(Turkey) Ergin Ataman
2019–20	Not awarded ^{1}	
2020–21	(France) Rodrigue Beaubois	(Turkey) Ergin Ataman
2021–22	(Czech Republic) Jan Veselý	(Serbia) Aleksandar Đorđević
2022–23	(Serbia) Vasilije Micić	(Turkey) Ergin Ataman
2023–24	(United States) Nigel Hayes-Davis	(Lithuania) Šarūnas Jasikevičius
2024–25	(Canada) Khem Birch	(Lithuania) Šarūnas Jasikevičius
2025–26	(United States) Wade Baldwin IV	(Lithuania) Šarūnas Jasikevičius

^1 There was no awarding in the 2019–20 season, because the season was cancelled due to the coronavirus pandemic in Turkey.

== Former participants ==
Note: includes 2026–27 season.

- **61** seasons: **Fenerbahçe**, **Galatasaray**
- **59** seasons: **Beşiktaş**
- **55** seasons: **Karşıyaka**
- **49** seasons: **Anadolu Efes**
- **43** seasons: **Tofaş**
- **35** seasons: İTÜ
- **34** seasons: TED Ankara Kolejliler, **Türk Telekom**
- **29** seasons: Darüşşafaka
- **18** seasons: Eczacıbaşı
- **17** seasons: Oyak-Renault
- **16** seasons: Ankara DSİ, Bandırma
- **15** seasons: Şekerspor
- **13** seasons: Muhafızgücü, Ülkerspor
- **11** seasons: Büyükçekmece Basketbol, Çukurova Sanayi, Gaziantep Basketbol
- **9** seasons: **Bahçeşehir Koleji**, Mersin Büyükşehir Belediyespor, Tuborg Pilsener
- **8** seasons: **Bursaspor**, Yenişehir
- **7** seasons: Altınordu, Erdemirspor, Konyaspor, **Petkimspor**, PTT İstanbul, Trabzonspor BK
- **6** seasons: Aliağaspor, Altay, Ankara Ziraat Fakültesi, Antalya Büyükşehir Belediyespor, Beslenspor, Büyük Kolej, **Denizli Basket**, Eskişehir Basket, Kadıköyspor, Konyaspor Basket, Ortaköyspor
- **5** seasons: Beykozspor, İnhisar, İstanbul Büyükşehir Belediyespor, **Körfez Basket**, Meysuspor, MKE Ankaragücü, Nasaşspor, ODTÜ, Paşabahçe, Taçspor, Uşak Sportif
- **4** seasons: Afyon Belediyespor, Antbirlik, Güney Sanayi
- **3** seasons: Antalyaspor, Hilalspor İzmir, Kepez Belediyespor, Modaspor, Yeşilgiresun Belediyespor
- **2** seasons: Adana Demirspor, Alpella, Bornova Belediyespor, **Esenler Erokspor**, Göztepe, Hacettepe Üniversitesi, Jandarmagücü, Karagücü, Kurtuluş, Mersin Spor, Muratpaşa Belediyespor, Netaş, OGM Ormanspor, Sakarya Büyükşehir Belediyespor, Samsunspor, **Trabzonspor**, Yalovaspor, Yıldırımspor
- **1** season: Anadolu Hisarı İdman Yurdu, Bakırköy Basket, Bakırköyspor, Balıkesir, **Bandırma Bordo**, Bandırma Kırmızı, Çağdaş Bodrumspor, **Çayırova Belediyespor**, Fethiye Belediyespor, Kuşadasıspor, Mülkiye, Silahlı Kuvvetler Gücü, Tarsus İdman Yurdu, Tekirdağ,

== See also ==
- Turkish Men's Basketball Cup
- Turkish Men's Basketball Presidential Cup
- Turkish Women's Basketball League
- Turkish Women's Basketball Cup
- Turkish Women's Basketball Presidential Cup
