= Tekelspor =

Tekelspor is a defunct basketball club based in Istanbul, Turkey that played in the Turkish Basketball League. Their home arena is the Haldun Alagaş Sports Hall. The club was sponsored by Tekel Company.
