= FIBA EuroChallenge individual statistics =

This article contains the individual statistics of players in the FIBA EuroChallenge competition. The FIBA EuroChallenge was the 3rd-tier level European-wide professional basketball league. The league is now defunct.

== Statistical leaders ==
=== Points ===
Season	Player	Team	PPG	GP
2003–04	(United States) Duane Woodward	AEL Limassol	21.4	14
2004–05	(United States) Alvin Young	Bnei Hasharon	22.6	11
2005–06	(United States) Khalid El-Amin	Azovmash	19.8	12
2006–07	(United States) Erwin Dudley	Türk Telekom	21.4	14
2007–08	(United States) Adrian Henning	LrNMKY	20.6	8
2008–09	(United States) Austin Nichols	Hyères-Toulon	19.6	10
2010–11	(United States) Ben Woodside	Gravelines-Dunkerque	18.5	13
2011–12	(United States) Chris Copeland	Okapi Aalstar	20.1	11
2012–13	(United States) Frank Hassell	Hapoel Holon	20.2	11
2013–14	(United States) Sharaud Curry	KTP	20.1	10
2014–15	(United States) Ryan Pearson	Antwerp Giants	19.8	12

=== Rebounds ===
Season	Name	Team	RPG	Games
2003–04	(United States) Chris Ensminger	GHP Bamberg	12.6	12
2004–05	(United States) Art Long	Azovmash Mariupol	11.9	15
2005–06	(Panama) Jaime Lloreda	Lokomotiv Rostov	11.5	13
2006–07	(Lithuania) Tadas Klimavičius	KK Šiauliai	9.0	12
2007–08	(Nigeria) Kenny Adeleke	Banvit Bandırma	11.0	8
2008–09	(Nigeria) Abdullahi Kuso	BC Sumykhimprom	8.8	10
2010–11	(Canada) Kyle Landry	BK Prostějov	9.6	14
2011–12	(United Kingdom) Pops Mensah-Bonsu	Beşiktaş	11.8	11
2012–13	(United States) Frank Hassell	Hapoel Holon	11.6	11
2013–14	(Belgium) Maxime De Zeeuw	Antwerp Giants	8.0	11

=== Assists ===
Season	Name	Team	APG	Games
2003–04	(United States) Stevin Smith	Strauss Iscar Nahariya	6.8	17
2004–05	(United States) Khalid El-Amin	Beşiktaş	7.2	20
2005–06	(United States) Maurice Whitfield	CEZ Nymburk	5.8	12
2006–07	(France) Laurent Sciarra	JDA Dijon	8.9	11
2007–08	(Croatia) Jakov Vladović	KK Zagreb	6.8	11
2008–09	(United States) Earl Boykins	Virtus Bologna	5.5	14
2010–11	(United States) Ben Woodside	Gravelines-Dunkerque	5.5	13
2011–12	(United States) Jared Jordan	Telekom Baskets	8.8	12
2012–13	(United States) Aaron Miles	Krasnye Krylia Samara	6.7	15
2013–14	(Russia) Anton Glazunov	Ural Yekaterinburg	7.1	13

=== Steals ===
Season	Name	Team	SPG	Games
2003–04	(Lithuania) Vidas Ginevičius	Alita Alytus	2.9	12
2004–05	(United States) Alvin Young	Bnei Hasharon	3.2	11
2005–06	(United States) Stevin Smith	Dynamo Moscow Region	2.3	12
2006–07	(France) Laurent Sciarra	JDA Dijon	3.0	11
2007–08	(United States) Travis Conlan	Dexia Mons-Hainaut	2.5	12
2008–09	(United States) Brian Greene	BC Sumykhimprom	2.4	10
2010–11	(United States) Darnell Wilson	Antwerp Giants	2.1	14
2011–12	(United States) Kenny Hasbrouck	EWE Baskets Oldenburg	2.1	11
2012–13	(United States) Jonte Flowers	Kataja Basket	6.7	13
2013–14	(United States) Mykal Riley	JDA Dijon	2.1	10

=== Blocks ===
Season	Name	Team	BPG	Games
2003–04	(Ukraine) Grigorij Khizhnyak	Peristeri Athens	2.5	11
2004–05	(North Macedonia) Toni Simik	KK Rabotnički	2.0	12
2005–06	(Ukraine) Serhiy Lishchuk	Azovmash Mariupol	1.3	12
2006–07	(Ukraine) Serhiy Lishchuk (2)	Azovmash Mariupol	2.1	17
2007–08	(Estonia) Janar Talts	Tartu Rock	1.5	13
2008–09	(United States) Sharrod Ford	Virtus Bologna	2.0	16
2010–11	(Tunisia) Salah Mejri	Antwerp Giants	2.0	14
2011–12	(United States) Anthony Gaffney	Telekom Baskets	2.1	12
2012–13	(Germany) Jonas Wohlfarth-Bottermann	Telekom Baskets	1.6	14
2013–14	(United States) Keith Benson	Tsmoki-Minsk	1.6	12

=== Individual highs ===
Category	Name	Team	
Points	(United States) Deron Williams	Beşiktaş	50
Rebounds	(Nigeria) Kenny Adeleke	Banvit Bandırma	21
Assists	(Bosnia and Herzegovina) Damir Mršić	Dynamo Moscow	17
Assists	(United States) Travis Conlan	Liège	17
Steals	(Croatia) Denis Mujagić	ECM Nymburk	10
Blocks	(United States) Vincent Jones	Ural Great Perm	8
Blocks	(United States) Marcus Douthit	Verviers-Pepinster	8

== Statistical top 10s ==
=== 2003–04 FIBA Europe League ===
Points per game:

1. Duane Woodward (EKA AEL Limassol): 21.3
2. Dametri Hill (Skonto Riga): 20.2
3. Ashante Johnson (ECM Nymburk): 19.5
4. Nestoras Kommatos (Aris Thessaloniki): 18.8
5. Andris Biedriņš (Skonto Riga): 18.6
6. George Zidek (ECM Nymburk): 18
7. Nebojša Bogavac (Hemofarm Vršac): 17.7
8. Nenad Čanak (NIS Vojvodina Novi Sad): 17.6
9. Steve Goodrich (BC Kyiv): 17.2
10. Troy Coleman (Kalev Tallinn): 16.8
11. Milan Gurović (NIS Vojvodina Novi Sad): 16.76
12. Jason Sasser (GHP Bamberg): 16.71

Assists per game:

1. Stevin Smith (Strauss Iscar Nahariya): 6.8
2. Randolph Childress (SLUC Nancy): 5.4
3. Maurice Whitfield (ECM Nymburk): 5.4
4. Petr Samoylenko (UNICS Kazan): 5.1
5. Vidas Ginevičius (Alita Alytus): 4.5
6. Roderick Blakney (Maroussi Telestet Athens): 4.4
7. Vassilis Spanoulis (Maroussi Telestet Athens): 4.28
8. Zakhar Pashutin (Ural Great Perm): 4.2
9. John Celestand (BC Kyiv): 4.0
10. Armands Šķēle (Anwil Włocławek): 4
11. Denis Mujagic (ECM Nymburk): 3.857
12. Dror Hajaj (Hapoel Tel Aviv): 3.85

Rebounds per game:

1. Chris Ensminger (GHP Bamberg): 12.5
2. Christophe Beghin (Telindus Oostende): 8.3
3. Andris Biedriņš (Skonto Riga): 8.18
4. Kšyštof Lavrinovič (Ural Great Perm): 8.13
5. JoJo Garcia (SLUC Nancy): 7.9
6. Steven Goodrich (BC Kyiv): 7.3
7. Stanislav Balashov (BC Kyiv): 7.2
8. Andrej Botichev (Azovmash Mariupol): 7.07
9. Eric Campbell (Strauss Iscar Nahariya): 7.05
10. Joey Beard (Telindus Oostende): 6.8
11. Grigorij Khizhnyak (GS Peristeri Athens): 6.5
12. Gennadiy Kuznyetsov (MBC Odessa): 6.3

Steals per game:

1. Vidas Ginevičius (Alita Alytus): 2.9
2. Denis Mujagic (ECM Nymburk): 2.7
3. Stevin Smith (Strauss Iscar Nahariya): 2.58
4. Bekir Yarangüme (Turk Telekom Ankara): 2.57
5. Duane Woodward (EKA AEL Limassol): 2.4
6. Roderick Blakney (Maroussi Telestet Athens): 2.3

Blocks per game:

1. Grigorij Khizhnyak (GS Peristeri Athens): 2.5
2. Vincent Jones (Ural Great Perm): 2.2
3. Andris Biedriņš (Skonto Riga): 1.8
4. Kšyštof Lavrinovič (Ural Great Perm): 1.7
5. Janar Talts (Kalev Tallinn): 1.53
6. Denis Ershov (Khimki Moscow): 1.5

=== 2004–05 FIBA Europe League ===
Points per game:

1. Alvin Young (Bnei Hasharon): 22.6
2. Art Long (Azovmash Mariupol): 21.3
3. Shammond Williams (UNICS Kazan): 21.1
4. Christian Dalmau (Hapoel Galil Elyon): 20.41
5. Khalid El-Amin (Beşiktaş Istanbul): 20.4
6. Sam Hoskin (Ural Great Perm): 20.2
7. Aleksandar Zečević (RBC Verviers-Pepinster): 20
8. Kelly McCarty (Dynamo St.Petersburg): 19.4
9. Damir Mršić (Fenerbahçe Istanbul): 19.36
10. Kelvin Gibbs (Hapoel Tel Aviv): 19.33
11. Lior Eliyahu (Hapoel Galil Elyon): 19.0
12. Sharon Shason (Ural Great Perm): 19.0

Assists per game:

1. Khalid El-Amin (Beşiktaş Istanbul): 7.1
2. Maurice Whitfield (CEZ Nymburk): 6.1
3. Ed Cota (Dynamo St.Petersburg): 6.0
4. Curtis McCants (Hapoel Tel Aviv): 5.6
5. Damir Mršić (Fenerbahçe Istanbul): 5.5
6. Shammond Williams (UNICS Kazan): 5.4
7. Lior Lubin (Azovmash Mariupol): 4.84
8. Gordan Firić (BS|Energy Braunschweig): 4.81
9. Hakan Köseoğlu (Tuborg Pilsener İzmir): 4.6
10. Eric Micoud (JDA Dijon): 4.6
11. Melvin Booker (Khimki Moscow): 4.21
12. Asım Pars (Tuborg Pilsener İzmir): 4.2

Rebounds per game:

1. Art Long (Azovmash Mariupol): 11.8
2. Aerick Sanders (Tuborg Pilsener İzmir): 10.0
3. Sam Hoskin (Ural Great Perm): 9.0
4. Chris Booker (Fenerbahçe Istanbul): 8.58
5. Joe Spinks (Demon Astronauts Amsterdam): 8.57
6. James Potter (Dexia Mons-Hainaut): 8.2
7. Marc Salyers (Fenerbahçe Istanbul): 8.1
8. Luc-Arthur Vebobe (Paris Basket Racing): 8
9. Marcus Douthit (RBC Verviers-Pepinster): 8
10. Alex Jensen (Tuborg Pilsener İzmir): 7.9
11. Boniface N'Dong (JDA Dijon): 7.8
12. Travon Bryant (Iraklis Thessaloniki): 7.7

Steals per game:

1. Alvin Young (Bnei Hasharon): 3.1
2. Joe Spinks (Demon Astronauts Amsterdam): 2.7
3. Khalid El-Amin (Beşiktaş Istanbul): 2.6
4. Justin Hamilton (Iraklis Thessaloniki): 2.4
5. Maurice Whitfield (CEZ Nymburk): 2.21
6. Kelvin Gibbs (Hapoel Tel Aviv): 2.2

Blocks per game:

1. Toni Simik (Fersped Rabotnicki Skopje): 2
2. Nedžad Sinanović (RBC Verviers-Pepinster): 1.8
3. Marcus Douthit (RBC Verviers-Pepinster): 1.8
4. Art Long (Azovmash Mariupol): 1.6
5. Denis Ershov (Khimki Moscow): 1.52
6. Eric Campbell (Strauss Iscar Nahariya): 1.5

=== 2005–06 FIBA EuroCup ===
Points per game:

1. Khalid El-Amin (Azovmash Mariupol): 19.7
2. Damir Mršić (Fenerbahçe Istanbul): 19.6
3. Kaspars Kambala (Fenerbahçe Istanbul): 17.3
4. Nikita Morgunov (Dynamo Moscow Region): 17.1
5. Jaime Lloreda (Lokomotiv Rostov): 16.8
6. Todor Gečevski (KK Zadar): 16.1
7. Radoslav Rančík (CEZ Nymburk): 15.9
8. Kevin Houston (Dexia Mons-Hainaut): 15.55
9. Roderick Blakney (Maroussi Honda Athens): 15.54
10. Jarod Stevenson (Fenerbahçe Istanbul): 15.2
11. Adam Hess (CEZ Nymburk): 15.0
12. Frankie King (Privatbank EKA AEL Limassol): 14.9

Assists per game:

1. Maurice Whitfield (CEZ Nymburk): 5.8
2. Elmer Bennett (DKV Joventut Badalona): 5.46
3. Stevin Smith (Dynamo Moscow Region): 5.41
4. Igor Miličić (Dexia Mons-Hainaut): 4.4
5. Ognjen Aškrabić (Dynamo St.Petersburg): 3.9
6. Jerry McCullough (Dynamo St.Petersburg): 3.75
7. Immanuel McElroy (RheinEnergie Cologne): 3.73
8. Khalid El-Amin (Azovmash Mariupol): 3.58
9. Damir Mršić (Fenerbahçe Istanbul): 3.58
10. Mark Dickel (Lokomotiv Rostov): 3.57
11. Melvin Booker (Khimki Moscow): 3.47
12. Gianmarco Pozzecco (Khimki Moscow): 3.4

Rebounds per game:

1. Jaime Lloreda (Lokomotiv Rostov): 11.5
2. Kebu Stewart (Vertical Vision Cantù): 10.4
3. Adam Hess (CEZ Nymburk): 7.8
4. Todor Gečevski (KK Zadar): 7.5
5. Kevin Fletcher (Śląsk Wrocław): 7.4
6. Kevin Houston (Dexia Mons-Hainaut): 7.3
7. George Evans (Dexia Mons-Hainaut): 7.1
8. Rubén Wolkowyski (Khimki Moscow): 6.8
9. Cory Violette (Fenerbahçe Istanbul): 6.7
10. Immanuel McElroy (RheinEnergie Cologne): 6.66
11. Óscar Torres (Khimki Moscow): 6.64
12. Nikita Morgunov (Dynamo Moscow Region): 6.5

Steals per game:

1. Stevin Smith (Dynamo Moscow Region): 2.25
2. George Evans (Dexia Mons-Hainaut): 2.21
3. Dean Oliver (KK Zadar): 2.1
4. Roderick Blakney (Maroussi Honda Athens): 2
5. Radoslav Rančík (CEZ Nymburk): 2
6. Lior Lubin (Azovmash Mariupol): 1.8

Blocks per game:

1. Serhiy Lishchuk (Azovmash Mariupol): 1.25
2. Marcin Gortat (RheinEnergie Cologne): 1.2
3. Rubén Wolkowyski (Khimki Moscow): 1.1
4. Kevin Fletcher (Śląsk Wrocław): 1.0
5. Jaime Lloreda (Lokomotiv Rostov): 0.92
6. Nikita Morgunov (Dynamo Moscow Region): 0.91

=== 2006–07 FIBA EuroCup ===
Points per game:

1. Erwin Dudley (Turk Telekom Ankara): 21.4
2. Travis Reed (Kalev/Cramo Tallinn): 19.8
3. Karim Souchu (Liege Basket): 18.1
4. Anthony Lux (JDA Dijon): 17.2
5. Sandis Valters (ASK Riga): 16.8
6. Arvydas Cepulis (KK Šiauliai): 16
7. Curtis Millage (ASK Riga): 15.8
8. Maleye Ndoye (JDA Dijon): 15.4
9. Roger Huggins (Liege Basket): 15
10. Andre Hutson (Panionios Athens): 14.8
11. Cătălin Burlacu (Kalev/Cramo Tallinn): 14.7
12. Will McDonald (MMT Estudiantes Madrid): 14.5

Assists per game:

1. Laurent Sciarra (JDA Dijon): 8.9
2. Tutku Açık (Turk Telekom Ankara): 5.1
3. Travis Best (Virtus Europonteggi Bologna): 4.3
4. Andrius Mažutis (KK Šiauliai): 4.1
5. Khalid El-Amin (Azovmash Mariupol): 3.9
6. Javier Mendiburu (MMT Estudiantes Madrid): 3.8
7. Milutin Aleksić (DTL-EKA AEL Limassol): 3.3
8. Roderick Blakney (Dynamo Moscow Region): 3.28
9. Curtis Millage (ASK Riga): 3.22
10. Ariel McDonald (Akasvayu Girona): 3.12
11. Vlado Ilievski (Virtus Europonteggi Bologna): 3.1
12. Haluk Yıldırım (Turk Telekom Ankara): 3
13. Sandis Buškevics (ASK Riga): 3

Rebounds per game:

1. Tadas Klimavičius (KK Šiauliai): 9
2. Serhiy Lishchuk (Azovmash Mariupol): 8.17
3. Josh Davis (Dynamo Moscow Region): 8.1
4. Andre Hutson (Panionios Athens): 7.7
5. Roger Huggins (Liege Basket): 7.6
6. Cătălin Burlacu (Kalev/Cramo Tallinn): 7.5
7. Travis Reed (Kalev/Cramo Tallinn): 7.3
8. Anthony Lux (JDA Dijon): 7.1
9. Erwin Dudley (Turk Telekom Ankara): 6.7
10. Krešimir Lončar (Lokomotiv Rostov): 6.4
11. Fedor Likholitov (Dynamo Moscow Region): 6.28
12. Kenan Bajramović (Azovmash Mariupol): 6.23

Steals per game:

1. Laurent Sciarra (JDA Dijon): 3
2. Roderick Blakney (Dynamo Moscow Region): 2.3
3. Curtis Millage (ASK Riga): 2.11
4. Roger Huggins (Liege Basket): 2.1
5. Andrius Mažutis (KK Šiauliai): 2.0
6. Panagiotis Kafkis (Panionios Athens): 1.9

Blocks per game:

1. Serhiy Lishchuk (Azovmash Mariupol): 2.0
2. Derrick Alston (Turk Telekom Ankara): 1.2
3. Remon van de Hare (DTL-EKA AEL Limassol): 1.0
4. Artūras Masiulis (KK Šiauliai): 1.0
5. Fedor Likholitov (Dynamo Moscow Region): 1
6. Tadas Klimavičius (KK Šiauliai): 1

=== 2007–08 FIBA EuroCup ===
Points per game:

1. Adrian Henning (Lappeenrannan NMKY): 20.6
2. Nando de Colo (Cholet Basket): 19.2
3. Alex Scales (CSK VVS Samara): 17.4
4. Joseph Smith (Spartak St. Petersburg): 17.3
5. Milutin Aleksić (Proteas EKA AEL Limassol): 16.8
6. Petri Virtanen (Lappeenrannan NMKY): 16.2
7. Andrew Adeleke (Banvit Bandırma): 15.7
8. Demetrius Alexander (Barons/LMT Riga): 15.6
9. Sasa Bratic (Khimik Yuzhniy): 15.3
10. Vanja Plisnić (Ural Great Perm): 15.3
11. Claude Marquis (Cholet Basket): 15.12
12. Marque Perry (CSK VVS Samara): 15.1

Assists per game:

1. Jakov Vladović (KK Zagreb): 6.8
2. Giorgi Tsintsadze (Tartu Rock): 5.2
3. Travis Conlan (Dexia Mons-Hainaut): 4.5
4. Petri Virtanen (Lappeenrannan NMKY): 4.37
5. Rolandas Jarutis (Cherkaski Mavpy): 4.37
6. Andrew Wisniewski (Ural Great Perm): 4.3
7. Tanel Tein (Tartu Rock): 4.1
8. Milutin Aleksić (Proteas EKA AEL Limassol): 4.0
9. Juha Sten (Lappeenrannan NMKY): 3.8
10. Duane Woodward (Proteas EKA AEL Limassol): 3.6
11. Wykeen Kelly (Khimik Yuzhniy): 3.5
12. Armands Šķēle (Barons/LMT Riga): 3.0

Rebounds per game:

1. Andrew Adeleke (Banvit Bandırma): 11
2. Yaniv Green (CSK VVS Samara): 8.4
3. Aki Ulander (Lappeenrannan NMKY): 8.14
4. Claude Marquis (Cholet Basket): 8.12
5. Ante Tomić (KK Zagreb): 7.6
6. Demetrius Alexander (Barons/LMT Riga): 7.5
7. Brian Cusworth (Tartu Rock): 7.2
8. Adrian Henning (Lappeenrannan NMKY): 7.1
9. Janar Talts (Tartu Rock): 6.92
10. Milutin Aleksić (Proteas EKA AEL Limassol): 6.90
11. Damir Markota (Spartak St.Petersburg): 6.7
12. Maxime Zianveni (Proteas EKA AEL): 6.4

Steals per game:

1. Travis Conlan (Dexia Mons-Hainaut): 2.5
2. Evgeni Voronov (CSK VVS Samara): 2.2
3. Alex Scales (CSK VVS Samara): 2.1
4. Steed Tchicamboud (Cholet Basket): 2
5. Derya Yannier (Banvit Bandırma): 1.8
6. Giorgi Tsintsadze (Tartu Rock): 1.7
7. Armands Šķēle (Barons/LMT Riga): 1.7

Blocks per game:

1. Janar Talts (Tartu Rock): 1.53
2. John Edwards (Cherkaski Mavpy): 1.5
3. Yaniv Green (CSK VVS Samara): 1.4
4. Brian Cusworth (Tartu Rock): 1.1
5. Andriy Agafonov (Khimik Yuzhniy): 1
6. Adrian Henning (Lappeenrannan NMKY): 1
