= FIBA EuroCup All-Star Day =

- Frequency: Annual
- Inaugurated: 2004
- Most recent: 2008
- Participants: Euripe and Rest of the World All-Stars
- Organizer: FIBA

FIBA EuroCup All-Star Day, or FIBA EuroChallenge All-Star Day, was the All-Star Game of the now defunct 3rd-tier level European-wide professional basketball league, the FIBA EuroChallenge tournament. It started in 2004, and lasted for five editions until 2008. The FIBA EuroCup All-Star Day was the first All-Star Game that was organised by FIBA after the FIBA EuroStars, and after the year 2000 conflict between FIBA and EuroLeague Basketball, which ultimately resulted in the current EuroLeague's take over of the previous FIBA EuroLeague.

The EuroCup All-Star Day event included a match between Europe and the Rest of the World All-Stars, a 3-point shootout contest, and a slam dunk contest in the 2007 edition. Lithuanian players Saulius Štombergas and Gintaras Einikis, were the only players that played in both the FIBA EuroStars, and also the FIBA EuroCup All-Star Day. Svetislav Pešić and Stanislav Eremin were the only coaches to be selected to both events.

== List of games ==
Bold: Team that won the game.

Year	Date	Location	Team	Score	Team	MVP
2004	March 16	Kyiv	Europe	84-**91**	**Rest of the World**	(United States) (Turkey) Michael Wright
2005	April 14	Nicosia	Europe	102-**106**	**Rest of the World**	(United States) (Georgia (country)) Shammond Williams
2006	March 14	Limassol	Europe	89-**97**	**Rest of the World**	(United States) Marcus Hatten
2007	March 20	Limassol	Europe	95-**105**	**Rest of the World**	(United States) Erwin Dudley
2008	March 25	Limassol	Europe	116-**118**	**Rest of the World**	(United States) Joe Smith

== Three-Point Shootout ==
Edition	Winner	Team	Runner-up	Team
2004	(Russia) Sergei Chikalkin	(Russia) Ural Great Perm		
2005	(Argentina) (Italy) Marcelo Nicola	(Ukraine) BC Kyiv		
2006	(United States) (South Korea) Jarod Stevenson	(Russia) Lokomotiv Rostov	(Italy) Gianmarco Pozzecco	(Russia) BC Khimki
2007	(Cyprus) Andreas Pilavas	(Cyprus) ENAD Ayiou Dometiou	(Lithuania) Arvydas Čepulis	(Lithuania) BC Šiauliai
2008	(Russia) Vasili Zavoruev	(Cyprus) Proteas EKA AEL	(United States) (France) James Cantamessa	(Belgium) Dexia Mons-Hainaut

== Slam-Dunk Contest ==
Edition	Winner	Team	Runner-up	Team
2007	(United States) Ryan Randle	(Cyprus) AEL Lemesos	(Belgium) Duke Tshomba	(Cyprus) Omonia

== FIBA Europe League All-Star Day 2004 ==
Source: fiba.basketball

Place: Kyiv, Ukraine, Att: 6.500

Date: 16.03.2004

Result: Europe 84 – Rest of the World 91

EUROPE:

- (Lithuania) Saulius Štombergas
- (Lithuania) Eurelijus Žukauskas
- (Russia) Sergei Chikalkin
- (France) Laurent Sciarra
- (Latvia) Armands Šķēle
- (Ukraine) Alexander Lokhmanchuk*
- (Israel) Yaniv Green
- (Latvia) Andris Biedriņš
- (Russia) Dmitri Domani
- (Russia) Andriy Lebediev
- (Russia) Dmitri Domani
- Head Coaches: (Russia) Stanislav Eremin & (Socialist Federal Republic of Yugoslavia) Dragan Raca & (Russia) Andrei Podkovyrov

REST OF WORLD:

- (United States) Mahmoud Abdul-Rauf
- (United States) (Turkey) Michael Wright
- (United States) Roderick Blakney
- (United States) Eric Campbell
- (United States) Ashante Johnson
- (United States) Tang Hamilton
- (United States) Dametri Hill
- (United States) Duane Woodward
- (United States) Sharone Wright
- (United States) Lorinza Harrington
- (United States) Steve Goodrich
- (United States) Larry Stewart
- Head Coaches: (Greece) Panagiotis Giannakis & (Israel) Zvi Sherf & (Croatia) Aleksandar Petrović
- (Socialist Federal Republic of Yugoslavia) Milan Gurović and (Greece) Nikos Ekonomou were selected to represent the Europe All-Stars, but he did not participate due to injury - replaced by (Ukraine) Alexander Lokhmanchuk

Game MVP: (United States) (Turkey) Michael Wright

Top scorers: Sergei Chikalkin (17 points), (Lithuania) Eurelijus Žukauskas (14 points), (Latvia) Andris Biedriņš (3 points), (Russia) Dmitri Domani (4 points), (Israel) Yaniv Green (13 points), (France) Laurent Sciarra (5 points), (Lithuania) Saulius Štombergas (13 points), (Latvia) Armands Šķēle (6 points), (Russia) Andriy Lebediev (2 points), (Ukraine) Alexander Lokhmanchuk (4 points), - (United States) (Turkey) Michael Wright (23 points), (United States) Mahmoud Abdul-Rauf (0 points), (United States) Roderick Blakney (10 points), (United States) Eric Campbell (11 points), (United States) Steve Goodrich (0 points), (United States) Lorinza Harrington (5 points), (United States) Duane Woodward (7 points), (United States) Ashante Johnson (16 points), (United States) Dametri Hill (4 points), (United States) Tang Hamilton (10 points), (United States) Tang Hamilton (5 points)

3-point contest winner: (Russia) Sergei Chikalkin

== FIBA Europe League All-Star Day 2005 ==
Source: fiba.basketball

Place: Nicosia, Cyprus

Venue: Eleftheria Indoor Hall, Att: 6.000

Date: 14.04.2005

Result: Europe 102 – Rest of the World 106

EUROPE:

- (Latvia) Kaspars Kambala
- (Croatia) Ratko Varda
- (Iceland) Jón Arnór Stefánsson
- (Bosnia and Herzegovina) Damir Mršić
- (Israel) Lior Lubin
- (Croatia) Krešimir Lončar
- (Greece) Ioannis Giannoulis
- (Turkey) Ömer Onan
- (Czech Republic) Radek Necas
- (Israel) Erez Markovich
- (Bulgaria) Dimitar Angelov
- (Cyprus) Michalis Kounounis
- Head Coaches: (Turkey) Aydın Örs & (Socialist Federal Republic of Yugoslavia) Dragan Raca

REST OF WORLD:

- (United States) Kelly McCarty
- (United States) Khalid El-Amin
- (Panama) Ed Cota
- (Argentina) Rubén Wolkowyski
- (United States) Shammond Williams
- (Argentina) Marcelo Nicola
- (United States) Marc Salyers
- (United States) LaMarr Greer
- (United States) Michael McDonald
- (United States) Art Long
- (Venezuela) Óscar Torres
- Head Coaches: (United States) David Blatt & (Italy) Renato Pasquali

Game MVP: (United States) Shammond Williams

Top scorers: (United States) Shammond Williams (20 points), (United States) Kelly McCarty (12 points), (United States) Marc Salyers (18 points), (United States) Art Long (13 points), (Panama) Ed Cota (8 points), (United States) Khalid El-Amin (9 points), (United States) LaMarr Greer (3 points), (Argentina) Rubén Wolkowyski (5 points), (Venezuela) Óscar Torres (3 points), (Argentina) Marcelo Nicola (11 points), (United States) Michael McDonald (4 points), - (Latvia) Kaspars Kambala (20 points), (Bulgaria) Dimitar Angelov (2 points), (Greece) Ioannis Giannoulis (7 points), (Cyprus) Michalis Kounounis (0 points), (Croatia) Ratko Varda (18 points), (Czech Republic) Radek Necas (6 points), (Iceland) Jón Arnór Stefánsson (10 points), (Turkey) Ömer Onan (13 points), (Bosnia and Herzegovina) Damir Mršić (12 points), (Israel) Erez Markovich (8 points), (Israel) Lior Lubin (2 points), (Croatia) Krešimir Lončar (4 points)

3-point contest winner: (Argentina) Marcelo Nicola

== FIBA EuroCup All-Star Day 2006 ==
Source: fiba.basketball

Place: Limassol, Cyprus

Venue: Spyros Kyprianou Athletic Center, Att: 6.000

Date: 14.03.2006

Result: Europe 89 – Rest of the World 97

EUROPE:

- (Latvia) Kaspars Kambala
- (Bosnia and Herzegovina) Damir Mršić
- (Italy) Gianmarco Pozzecco
- (Lithuania) Gintaras Einikis
- (Israel) Lior Eliyahu
- (Croatia) Krešimir Lončar
- (Serbia) Milutin Aleksić
- (Romania) Cătălin Burlacu
- (Lithuania) Artūras Jomantas
- (Cyprus) Georgios Palalas
- Head Coaches: (Greece) Fotis Katsikaris

REST OF WORLD:

- (United States) (Russia) Kelly McCarty
- (United States) Khalid El-Amin
- (United States) Mark Dickel
- (Argentina) Rubén Wolkowyski
- (United States) Jarod Stevenson
- (South Korea) Moon Tae-jong
- (United States) Glen McGowan
- (United States) Frankie King
- (United States) LaMarr Greer
- (Panama) Jaime Lloreda
- (United States) Marcus Hatten
- (United States) Michael Harris
- (Venezuela) Óscar Torres
- Head Coaches: (Croatia) Aleksandar Petrović & (Serbia) Saša Obradović

Game MVP: (United States) Marcus Hatten

Top scorers: Kaspars Kambala (21 points), (Serbia) Milutin Aleksić (6 points), (Romania) Cătălin Burlacu (3 points), (Lithuania) Gintaras Einikis (10 points), (Israel) Lior Eliyahu (10 points), (Croatia) Krešimir Lončar (12 points), (Lithuania) Artūras Jomantas (5 points), (Cyprus) Georgios Palalas (2 points), (Italy) Gianmarco Pozzecco (11 points), (Bosnia and Herzegovina) Damir Mršić (9 points) - (United States) Marcus Hatten (17 points), (United States) Mark Dickel (0 points), (United States) Khalid El-Amin (14 points), (United States) LaMarr Greer (13 points), (United States) Michael Harris (5 points), (Venezuela) Óscar Torres (11 points), (United States) Glen McGowan (8 points), (United States) Frankie King (0 points), (Argentina) Rubén Wolkowyski (6 points), (United States) Jarod Stevenson (8 points), (Panama) Jaime Lloreda (6 points), (South Korea) Moon Tae-jong (8 points), (United States) (Russia) Kelly McCarty (9 points)

- (Belarus) Vladimir Veremeenko, (Spain) Rudy Fernandez, (Greece) Alexis Kyritsis, (Greece) Kostas Vasiliadis and (New Zealand) Phill Jones were selected for Europe, but didn't play.

3-point contest winner: (United States) Jarod Stevenson

== FIBA EuroCup All-Star Day 2007 ==
Place: Limassol, Cyprus,

Venue: Spyros Kyprianou Athletic Center, Att: 6.000

Date: 20.03.2007

Result: Europe 95 – Rest of the World 105

EUROPE:

- (France) Laurent Sciarra
- (Ukraine) Artur Drozdov
- (Denmark) Christian Drejer
- (Spain) Marc Gasol
- (Ukraine) Serhiy Lishchuk
- (Croatia) Krešimir Lončar
- (Serbia) Milutin Aleksić
- (Turkey) Tutku Açık
- (Turkey) Bekir Yarangüme
- (Latvia) Sandis Valters
- (Russia) Nikolai Padius
- (Lithuania) Arvydas Cepulis
- Head Coaches: (Socialist Federal Republic of Yugoslavia) Svetislav Pešić & (Latvia) Igors Miglinieks

REST OF WORLD:

- (United States) Ariel McDonald
- (United States) Khalid El-Amin
- (United States) Andre Hutson
- (United States) Kennedy Winston
- (United States) Erwin Dudley
- (United States) Travis Reed
- (Brazil) Guilherme Giovannoni
- (United States) Travis Conlan
- (United States) Marque Perry
- (United States) Anthony Lux
- (United States) Jeron Roberts
- (United States) Curtis Millage
- Head Coaches: (North Macedonia) Žare Markovski & (Serbia) Luka Pavićević

Game MVP: (United States) Erwin Dudley

Top scorers: (United States) Erwin Dudley (23 points), (United States) Khalid El-Amin (11 points), (United States) Marque Perry (15 points), (United States) Curtis Millage (2 points), (United States) Travis Reed (4 points), (United States) Anthony Lux (6 points), (United States) Jeron Roberts (2 points), (United States) Ariel McDonald (13 points), (United States) Travis Conlan (0 points), (Brazil) Guilherme Giovannoni (2 points), (United States) Kennedy Winston (14 points), (United States) Andre Hutson (14 points) - (Ukraine) Serhiy Lishchuk (15 points), (France) Laurent Sciarra (11 points), (Russia) Nikolai Padius (0 points), (Croatia) Krešimir Lončar (8 points), (Serbia) Milutin Aleksić (9 points), (Ukraine) Artur Drozdov (10 points), (Denmark) Christian Drejer (7 points), (Latvia) Sandis Valters (4 points), (Turkey) Tutku Açık (3 points), (Turkey) Bekir Yarangüme (7 points), (Lithuania) Arvydas Cepulis (12 points), (Spain) Marc Gasol (9 points)

3-point contest winner: (United States) Andreas Pilavas

Slam dunk contest winner: (United States) Ryan Randle

== FIBA EuroCup All-Star Day 2008 ==
Source: fiba.basketball

Place: Limassol, Cyprus

Venue: Spyros Kyprianou Athletic Center, Att: 5.500

Date: 25.03.2008

Result: Europe 116 – Rest of the World 118

EUROPE:

- (France) Nando de Colo
- (Latvia) Armands Šķēle
- (United Kingdom) Mike Lenzly
- (Georgia (country)) Giorgi Tsintsadze
- (Israel) Yaniv Green
- (Croatia) Krešimir Lončar
- (Croatia) Ante Tomić
- (Serbia) Milutin Aleksić
- (Lithuania) Martynas Andriukaitis
- (Greece) Dimitris Verginis
- (Finland) Petri Virtanen
- (Serbia) Sasa Bratic
- Head Coaches: (Russia) Valeri Tikhonenko & (Croatia) Željko Pavličević

REST OF WORLD:

- (United States) Demetrius Alexander
- (United States) Ryan Randle
- (United States) Duane Woodward
- (United States) Alex Scales
- (United States) Joe Smith
- (United States) Adrian Henning
- (Canada) Olumuyiwa Famutimi
- (United States) James Cantamessa
- (United States) Brian Cusworth
- (United States) Andrew Wisniewski
- (United States) Brent Wright
- (United States) John Edwards
- Head Coaches: (United States) Chris Finch & (United States) (Sweden) Charles Barton

Game MVP: (United States) Joe Smith

Top scorers: (United States) Joe Smith (28 points), (Canada) Olumuyiwa Famutimi (United States) (12 points), Adrian Henning (14 points), (United States) Alex Scales (23 points), (United States) Demetrius Alexander (13 points), (United States) James Cantamessa (4 points), (United States) Brian Cusworth (11 points), (United States) Duane Woodward (8 points), (United States) Ryan Randle (6 points), - (France) Nando de Colo (24 points), (Serbia) Milutin Aleksić (20 points), (Croatia) Krešimir Lončar (18 points), (Serbia) Sasa Bratic (18 points), (Lithuania) Martynas Andriukaitis (4 points), (Israel) Yaniv Green (6 points), (United Kingdom) Mike Lenzly (11 points), (Latvia) Armands Šķēle (2 points), (Croatia) Ante Tomić (0 points), (Georgia (country)) Giorgi Tsintsadze (5 points), (Greece) Dimitris Verginis (3 points), (Finland) Petri Virtanen (5 points)

3-point contest winner: (Russia) Vasili Zavoruev

== Top Scorers ==
=== Per edition ===
Edition	Player	Points	Team
2004	(United States) Michael Wright	23	World All-Stars
2005	(United States) Shammond Williams (Latvia) Kaspars Kambala	20	World All-Stars; Europe All-Stars
2006	(Latvia) Kaspars Kambala (2)	21	World All-Stars
2007	(United States) Erwin Dudley	23	World All-Stars
2008	(United States) Joe Troy Smith	28	World All-Stars

=== All-time ===
Rank	Player	Points	Average
1	(Croatia) Krešimir Lončar	42	10.5
2	(Latvia) Kaspars Kambala	41	20.5
3	(Serbia) Milutin Aleksić	35	11.6
4	(United States) Khalid El-Amin	34	11.3

== All-Star players ==
=== Players with most selections ===
- Player nationalities by national team.

Player	Number Of Selections	Years Selected
(Croatia) Krešimir Lončar	4	2005, 2006, 2007, 2008
(United States) Khalid El-Amin	3	2005, 2006, 2007
(Serbia) Milutin Aleksić	3	2006, 2007, 2008
(Argentina) Rubén Wolkowyski	2	2005, 2006
(United States) (Russia) Kelly McCarty	2	2005, 2006
(United States) LaMarr Greer	2	2005, 2006
(France) Laurent Sciarra	2	2004, 2007
(Israel) Yaniv Green	2	2004, 2008
(Bosnia and Herzegovina) Damir Mršić	2	2005, 2006
(United States) Duane Woodward	2	2004, 2008
(Latvia) Kaspars Kambala	2	2005, 2006
(Venezuela) Óscar Torres	2	2005, 2006

=== Players in FIBA All-Star Games (1996–2008) ===
Player	Total Selections	FIBA All-Star Day	FIBA EuroStars
(Greece) Nikos Ekonomou	**5**	2004	1996–1999
(Lithuania) Gintaras Einikis	**2**	2006	1997
(Lithuania) Saulius Štombergas	**2**	2004	1998

=== FIBA All-Star Day players in NBA ===
- (United States) Mahmoud Abdul-Rauf
- (United States) Art Long
- (United States) (Russia) Kelly McCarty
- (United States) Khalid El-Amin
- (France) Nando de Colo
- (Venezuela) Óscar Torres
- (Spain) Rudy Fernandez
- (Spain) Marc Gasol
- (Argentina) Rubén Wolkowyski

== All-Star coaches ==
=== Coaches with most selections ===
Coach	Number Of Selections	Years Selected
(Croatia) Aleksandar Petrović	**2**	2004, 2006
(Serbia) (Cyprus) Dragan Raca	**2**	2004, 2005

=== Coaches in FIBA All-Star Games (1996–2008) ===
Player	Total Selections	FIBA All-Star Day	FIBA EuroStars
(Socialist Federal Republic of Yugoslavia) (Germany) Svetislav Pešić	**2**	2007	1998
(Russia) Stanislav Eremin	**2**	2004	1998
(Greece) Panagiotis Giannakis	**2**	2004	2007

=== FIBA All-Star Day coaches in NBA ===
- (United States) (Israel) David Blatt
- (United States) Chris Finch

== See also ==
- FIBA All-Star Games
- FIBA EuroStars

== Distinctions ==
=== FIBA Hall of Fame ===
- (Socialist Federal Republic of Yugoslavia) Svetislav Pešić
- (Greece) Panagiotis Giannakis (As a player)
