= Cantamessa =

Cantamessa is an Italian surname. Notable people with the surname include:

- Christian Cantamessa (born 1976), Italian-American video game designer
- Gene Cantamessa (1931–2011), American sound engineer
- Jim Cantamessa (born 1978), American basketball player and coach
- Steve Cantamessa, American sound engineer
