= LaMarr Greer =

American basketball player (born 1976)

Personal information
- Born: May 16, 1976 (age 49) Cape May Court House, New Jersey, U.S.
- Listed height: 6 ft 5 in (1.96 m)
- Listed weight: 225 lb (102 kg)

Career information
- High school: Middle Township (Cape May Court House, New Jersey)
- College: Florida State (1994–1998)
- NBA draft: 1998: undrafted
- Playing career: 1998–2013
- Position: Point guard / shooting guard
- Number: 8

Career history
- 1998, 1999: Atlantic City Seagulls
- 1999–2000: Trenton Shooting Stars
- 2000: Baltimore Bayrunners
- 2000: Trenton Shooting Stars
- 2001: Napoli
- 2001–2002: Messina
- 2002–2003: Napoli
- 2003–2004: UNICS
- 2004–2007: Kyiv
- 2007–2008: Olympia Larissa
- 2008–2009: Keravnos
- 2009: ASU Sports Club
- 2009–2010: Ironi Nahariya
- 2010–2012: Phantoms Braunschweig
- 2012–2013: Kouvot

Career highlights
- Second-team Parade All-American (1994); McDonald's All-American (1994)

LaMarr Vernon Greer (born May 16, 1976) is a high school McDonald's All American and retired American basketball player. After short stints in the United States Basketball League and the International Basketball League, he embarked on a professional career in Europe. Greer retired in 2013.

Greer grew up in Middle Township, New Jersey. He attended Overbrook High School and transferred to Middle Township High School during his junior year, leading the school's basketball team to win the NJSIAA Group II state championships in both 1993 and 1994. In the 1994 season Greer was recognized as a McDonald's All American and New Jersey High School Player of the Year. He also participated in the Roundball Classic, ending the game with a double-double of 16 points and 10 assists. He has the most points in Middle Township High School history.

Greer has a son, Corey Greer, who plays Varsity basketball for well-known high school basketball team, Camden Panthers. Greer also is well known around the area for his commitment for youth. He does daily workouts with the youth during the high school basketball team off-season. In 2021, Greer became a teacher and the head basketball coach at his alma mater.
