= Dametri Hill =

American basketball player

Personal information
- Born: January 8, 1974 (age 52) St. Petersburg, Florida, U.S.
- Listed height: 6 ft 7 in (2.01 m)
- Listed weight: 290 lb (132 kg)

Career information
- High school: Dixie Hollins (St. Petersburg, Florida)
- College: Florida (1992–1996)
- NBA draft: 1996: undrafted
- Playing career: 1996–2011
- Position: Power forward / center

Career history
- 1996–1997: Hapoel Tel Aviv
- 1997–1998: BCM Gravelines
- 1998–1999: Hapoel Tel Aviv
- 1999–2000: Sioux Falls Skyforce
- 2000–2001: Tampa Bay ThunderDawgs
- 2001–2002: Shenzhen Yikang
- 2002–2003: Entente Orléanaise
- 2003–2004: BK Skonto
- 2004–2005: APOEL
- 2005–2006: CAB Madeira
- 2006–2010: SPU Nitra
- 2010–2011: Astrum Levice

Career highlights
- Slovak Extraliga champion (2009); Slovak Extraliga All-Star (2009); Israeli Premier League Top Scorer (1997); Second-team All-SEC (1996)

Dametri Antonio Hill (born January 8, 1974) is an American former professional basketball player. A 6-foot-7, 290-pound center/power forward, he played high school basketball at Dixie Hollins High School in his native St. Petersburg, Florida and played four years of college basketball for the Florida Gators. During his college career he reached the Final Four as a sophomore during the 1994 NCAA tournament and was an All-SEC selection as a senior in 1996. After going undrafted in the 1996 NBA draft he started his professional career in Israel, and in his first season he led the league in scoring with 22.8 points per game. He went on to play in France, China, Latvia, Cyprus, Portugal and Slovakia (where he won a league title in 2009).

== High school career ==
Hill was born in St. Petersburg, Florida, where he attended Dixie M. Hollins High School. He was a member of the high school varsity team since his freshman year and started to get state recognition during his junior year, when he led Pinellas County in scoring, averaging almost 28 points per game, and also averaged 15 rebounds. He was selected in the Class AAAA All-State teams BOYS First team as a junior, and was also a Street & Smith All-American selection.

Hill's senior year saw him average 26.3 points per game, making the All-Southern state team. He finished his career at Dixie Hollins with a total of 2,392 career points, a Pinellas County record.

== College career ==
Hill made a verbal commitment to Florida in April 1991 and signed in November of the same year. During his first season with the Gators Hill saw limited playing time, only 60 total minutes in 16 games, and averaged 1.1 points and 0.6 rebounds per game under coach Lon Kruger. The following year Hill was included in the starting five, and started all of the 37 games he played that season. He averaged 26.2 minutes per game and he ranked third on the team in scoring (12.7 points per game) and second in rebounding (4.9 per games, behind Andrew DeClercq and tied with Craig Brown). Hill participated at the 1994 NCAA tournament, reaching the Final Four where his team lost to Duke: during that game, Hil scored a team-high 16 points and grabbed 9 rebounds in 30 minutes of play. That season he was also noted for having lost a significant amount of weight: The New York Times reported that he went from 351 to 286 pounds.

Hill kept his starting role for his junior season, led the team in field goal percentage (.525) and ranked second on the team in scoring (13.7 points per game behind Dan Cross) and rebounding (5.9 behind DeClercq). The team qualified for the 1995 NCAA tournament for the second year in a row, and Hill played Florida's only game against the Iowa State Cyclones, recording 11 points and 3 rebounds in 31 minutes. For Hill's senior season he was named team captain and he played 33 minutes per game (a career-high), leading the team in scoring (17.6) and rebounding (7.8) average. On January 29, 1996, he was named SEC Player of the Week and on March 2, 1996, he scored a career-high 30 points against Tennessee, including a 18-footer game winner. At the end of the season he was named in the All-SEC Second Team by the Associated Press and by the coaches, and won the MVP award during the NABC All-Star Game.

He ended his career with the Gators with 1,376 total points, 580 rebounds and 2,771 total minutes. He recorded 12 career double-doubles and scored in double figures in 77 of 110 games (94 starts). His signature hook shot earned him the nickname "Da Meat Hook" during his Florida years.

=== College statistics ===
Year	Team	GP	GS	MPG	FG%	3P%	FT%	RPG	APG	SPG	BPG	PPG
1992–93	Florida	16	0	3.8	.333	.000	.636	0.6	0.2	0.0	0.1	1.1
1993–94	Florida	37	37	26.2	.513	.000	.657	4.9	0.6	0.7	0.1	12.7
1994–95	Florida	29	29	28.2	.525	.304	.686	5.9	1.1	0.6	0.3	13.7
1995–96	Florida	28	28	33.0	.489	.318	.671	7.8	0.9	1.1	0.8	17.6
Career		110	94	25.2	.505	.304	.669	5.3	0.7	0.7	0.3	12.5

== Professional career ==
After his senior year of college, Hill was automatically eligible for the 1996 NBA draft: he went undrafted, but was selected in 6th round (65th overall) of the Continental Basketball Association draft by the Florida Beach Dogs. He decided to sign for Israeli team Hapoel Tel Aviv: in his first season as a professional player he averaged 22.8 points, 5.6 rebounds and 1.4 assists in the Israeli Basketball Premier League, and was the league's leading scorer. In 1997 he moved to France and played in the LNB Pro A with BCM Gravelines: in 30 games he averaged 14.6 points and 5.6 rebounds in 32.1 minutes per game. In 1998 joined Hapoel Tel Aviv again, and played 10 games in the 1998–99 season, averaging 18.2 points and 6.5 rebounds in 36.7 minutes.

He came back to the United States in 1999 and played the 1999–2000 CBA season with the Sioux Falls Skyforce, averaging 13.5 and 4.9 rebounds over 50 games (35 starts) during the regular season: he also played 2 playoff games, averaging 15 points and 3.5 rebounds. In 2000 he signed for the Tampa Bay ThunderDawgs of the American Basketball Association, playing in the league's inaugural season. In 2001 he signed for Shenzhen Yikang, and played the team's only season in the Chinese Basketball Association. In 2002 he went back to France and joined Entente Orléanaise, a team which played in the LNB Pro B, the second level of French basketball. During the season he played 23 games and averaged 17.4 points and 7.1 rebounds per game in 30 minutes of play.

In 2003 he joined BK Skonto, a Latvian team of Riga, and played 33 league games, averaging 21.3 points and 6.9 rebounds; he also played in the 2003–04 FIBA Europe League, ranking second in scoring with 20.2 points per game: he was selected to participate in the 2004 FIBA EuroCup All-Star Day. In 2004 he played in Cyprus for APOEL, and in 2005 he transferred to Portuguese team CAB Madeira: in 18 league games he averaged 20.2 points and 5.1 rebounds in 29.1 minutes per game.

In 2006 he moved to Slovakia and signed for SPU Nitra. In the following season he ranked 4th in the league in scoring (19.3 points) and 3rd in rebounding (8.2). In 2009 he won the league title with Nitra, contributing with 17 points during the final game against Pezinok, and was selected for the All-Star game, during which he scored 15 points for the West team. After playing the 2009–10 season with Nitra, Hill moved to Astrum Levice, where he averaged 10.5 points and 4.0 rebounds in 20.1 minutes per game in his last season of professional basketball.
