= Joe Troy Smith =

American basketball player (born 1977)

Personal information
- Born: December 17, 1977 (age 48) New Orleans, Louisiana, U.S.
- Listed height: 6 ft 4 in (1.93 m)
- Listed weight: 210 lb (95 kg)

Career information
- College: Alabama–Huntsville (1996–2001)
- NBA draft: 2001: undrafted
- Playing career: 2001–2015
- Position: Point guard / shooting guard
- Number: 10

Career history
- 2001: Ventspils
- 2002: St. Louis Sky Hawks
- 2003: Rockford Lightning
- 2003–2004: Fresno Heatwave
- 2004–2005: RB Montecatini
- 2005–2006: Pallacanestro Biella
- 2006–2007: NSB Rieti
- 2007–2008: Spartak St. Petersburg
- 2008–2010: Pallacanestro Biella
- 2010–2011: Pallacanestro Reggiana
- 2011: Barak Netanya
- 2011–2012: Unión de Formosa
- 2012–2015: Pinheiros

Career highlights
- FIBA EuroChallenge All-Star Day MVP (2008); Argentine League Top Scorer (2012)

Joseph Troy Smith (born December 17, 1977) is an American former professional basketball player. He played as a point guard-shooting guard.

== College career ==
Smith played college basketball at the University of Alabama–Huntsville, with the Alabama–Huntsville Chargers, from 1996 to 2001.

== Professional career ==
Smith played basketball in various leagues over his pro career. Some of the pro leagues that played in during his career included: the Italian LBA League, the Russian SuperLeague A, the Israeli Super League, the European-wide 2nd tier EuroCup, the Argentine LNB League, and the Brazilian NBB League.

== Awards and accomplishments ==
- Italian 2nd Division Champion: (2007)
- FIBA EuroChallenge All-Star Day MVP: (2008)
- Argentine League Top Scorer: (2012)
- 2× Brazilian League All-Star: (2013, 2014)
- FIBA Americas League Champion: (2013)
