= Kaspars Kambala =

Latvian basketball player (born 1978)

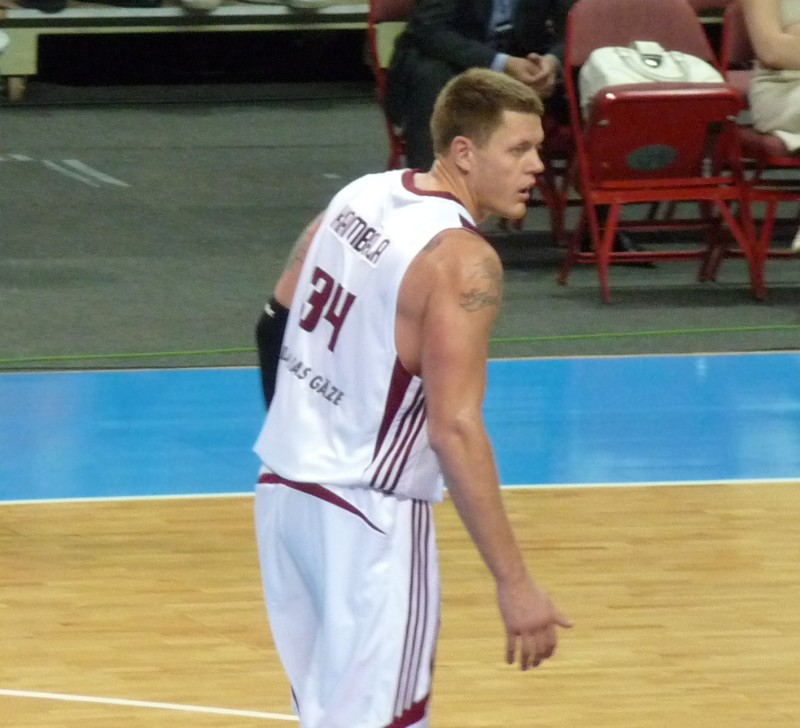
- Kambala with Latvia in 2009

Personal information
- Born: 13 December 1978 (age 47) Jelgava, Latvian SSR, Soviet Union
- Listed height: 6 ft 9 in (2.06 m)
- Listed weight: 275 lb (125 kg)

Career information
- High school: Homestead (Mequon, Wisconsin)
- College: UNLV (1997–2001)
- NBA draft: 2001: undrafted
- Playing career: 2001–2020
- Position: Power forward / center
- Number: 11, 34

Career history
- 1993–1995: Rīgas Laiks
- 2001–2003: Efes Pilsen
- 2003–2004: Real Madrid
- 2004–2005: UNICS Kazan
- 2005–2007: Fenerbahçe
- 2009: ASK Riga
- 2009–2010: Enisey
- 2010: Lukoil Akademik
- 2011: Aliağa Petkim
- 2011: Mahram Tehran
- 2011–2012: Türk Telekom
- 2013: Pİ Koleji
- 2013–2014: Ankara DSI
- 2014–2015: Barons
- 2015–2016: Adanaspor
- 2016–2017: Near East University
- 2019: Jūrmala
- 2019–2020: Ogres milži
- 2020: Varenie runči

Career highlights
- 2× Turkish League champion (2002, 2003); Turkish Cup champion (2002); 2× FIBA EuroCup All-Star Day (2005, 2006); EuroLeague records: Most 2-point field goals made in a game; Most 2-point field goals attempted in a game

Kaspars Kambala (born 13 December 1978) is a Latvian former professional basketball player and a former professional boxer. Standing at 2.06 m (6 ft 9 in), he plays at the position of forward-center.

== High school ==
A 1997 graduate of Homestead High School in Mequon, Wisconsin and a native of Riga, Latvia. He averaged 21 points and 12 rebounds in his senior season (1996–97) and earned All-Wisconsin honors, all-state, MVP of the Northshore Conference and all-county. Homestead compiled a 16–9 overall record and finished second in conference. Kambala played in the Eddie Jones Classic All-Star game, which was held at the Pyramid in Long Beach, California, on 15 April 1997.

== College ==
Kambala played college basketball at UNLV from 1997 to 2001. He led the team in scoring in 1999–2000 (18.5 average) and 2000–01 (16.9). He finished up in 2001 as the program's 10th all-time highest scorer and ranks fourth on the school's all-time rebounding list, leading the team in boards in three of his four seasons on campus.

== Professional career ==
Kaspars Kambala actually played professional basketball as a teenager in Latvia before going to America where he attended high school in Wisconsin and played college basketball at UNLV. He continued his career in Europe, playing for such high-level clubs as Efes Pilsen, Real Madrid, UNICS Kazan, Fenerbahçe.

In December 2006 he was suspended for doping. His suspension in basketball ended on 12 December 2008. When his sanction from playing basketball ended, Kas, as he is often called by fans, stated that he was in great shape and that he was once again ready to play at the highest level of European basketball. For few games he joined ASK Riga, but soon after went to Russia to play for Enisey Krasnoyarsk, where he spent next year and a half. In September 2010 Kambala joined Bulgarian team Lukoil Academic. In the middle of the season Kambala returned to Turkey and joined Aliağa Petkim. In July 2011 he signed with Türk Telekom B.K. for one season.

On 11 July 2015 Kambala signed with Adanaspor.

On 7 June 2016 he signed with Yakın Doğu Üniversitesi Spor Kulübü for a one-year $48000 contract.

== Latvian national men's basketball team ==
In 2001 was Kaspars Kambala's first appearance for the Latvian national basketball team when he participated in the European Championship. He also participated in two more Eurobasket tournaments (2003, 2009).

== Trivia ==
During his suspension from basketball Kaspars decided to become a professional boxer.

Kambala shares the Euroleague's single-game scoring record for last decade - 41 points against FC Barcelona on 30 October 2002 – with three players, Bobby Brown, Carlton Myers and the late Alphonso Ford.

In April 2014, Kambala released his autobiography "Kambala..., āmen!" that became a bestseller in Latvia.

== Honors and awards ==
- 1998: Western Athletic Conference Tournament Champions (UNLV)
- 2000: Mountain West Conference Regular Season and Tournament (UNLV)

== Professional boxing record ==
4 fights	3 wins	0 losses
By knockout	3	0
Draws	1	

No.	Result	Record	Opponent	Type	Round, time	Date	Location	Notes
5	Win	4–0–1	(Belarus) Aliaksandr Niakhaichyk	TKO	4 (4), 2:33	23 Mar 2019	Arēna Rīga, Riga, Latvia	
4	Win	3–0–1	(United States) Ronnie Weaver	TKO	1 (4), 2:08	8 Jul 2008	(United States) Las Vegas Hilton, Winchester, Nevada, U.S.	
3	Win	2–0–1	(United States) Emile Whiterock	UD	4	9 May 2008	(United States) Orleans Hotel & Casino, Paradise, Nevada, U.S.	
2	Win	1–0–1	(United States) Mike Goins	KO	2 (4), 1:48	7 Mar 2008	(United States) Orleans Hotel & Casino, Paradise, Nevada, U.S.	
1	Draw	0–0–1	(Mexico) Álvaro Morales	MD	4	11 Jan 2008	(United States) Orleans Hotel & Casino, Paradise, Nevada, U.S.	
