= Erwin Dudley =

American basketball player (born 1981)

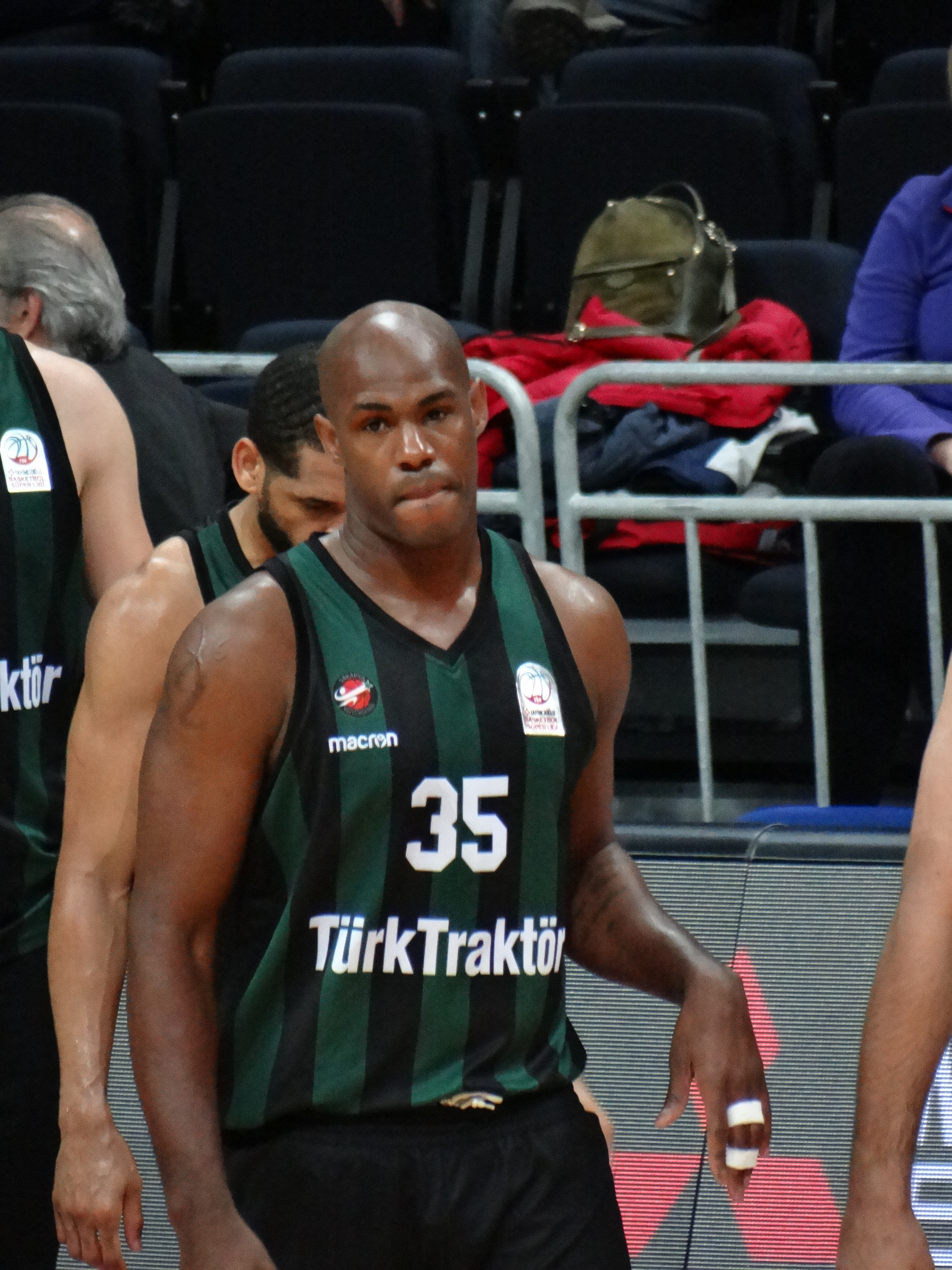
- Dudley with Sakarya BB

No. 35 – Sakarya BB
- Position: Power forward / center
- League: BSL

Personal information
- Born: October 2, 1981 (age 45) Uniontown, Alabama, U.S.
- Listed height: 6 ft 8.5 in (2.04 m)
- Listed weight: 245 lb (111 kg)

Career information
- High school: Robert C. Hatch (Uniontown, Alabama)
- College: Alabama (1999–2003)
- NBA draft: 2003: undrafted
- Playing career: 2004–2018

Career history
- 2004–2005: Maccabi Rishon LeZion
- 2005–2010: Türk Telekom
- 2010–2011: Efes Pilsen
- 2011–2012: Beşiktaş Milangaz
- 2012–2014: Galatasaray Liv Hospital
- 2014–2016: Darüşşafaka Doğuş
- 2017–present: Sakarya BB

Career highlights
- EuroChallenge champion (2012); FIBA EuroCup All-Star Game MVP (2007); 2× Turkish League champion (2012, 2013); 2× Turkish Cup winner (2008, 2012); 2× Turkish President's Cup winner (2009, 2010); Third-team All-American – AP (2002); SEC Player of the Year (2002)

Erwin Lamond Dudley (born October 2, 1981) is an American professional basketball player for Sakarya BB of the Turkish Basketball Super League (BSL). He also holds Turkish citizenship, under the name of Ersin Dağlı.

== College career ==
Born in Uniontown, Alabama, Dudley is a graduate of the University of Alabama in Tuscaloosa. While at the Capstone, he consistently made a name for himself. During his college basketball career, Dudley was named an All-American by the Associated Press, a consensus Southeastern Conference 2002 Player of the Year and a unanimous All-SEC First Team pick.

Dudley led the Southeastern Conference in rebounding for three consecutive seasons, becoming the first to do so since Shaquille O'Neal. He also holds the university's school record with 129 career starts and ranks seventh all-time in scoring (1,764 points) and fourth in rebounding (1,184). Dudley also recorded 43 double-doubles, giving him the nickname “E-double double”.

== Professional career ==
He missed the 2003–2004 season due to a knee injury. He would have played for Basket Rimini Crabs in Italy.

In 2004, Dudley started his professional career with Maccabi Rishon LeZion in Israel starting in 22 games, averaging 19.7 points and 11.6 rebounds.

In 2005, he joined Türk Telekom in Ankara, Turkey, where he averaged 17.1 points and 8.4 rebounds in 34 games. In 2006, Dudley re-signed with Türk Telekom, where he averaged 16.1 points, 8.8 rebounds and 1.4 assists in the Turkish Basketball League and 21.4 points, 6.8 rebounds, 1.2 assists in Fiba EuroCup. After playing five seasons with Türk Telekom, Dudley's contract came to an end. In the summer of 2010, he signed a contract with Efes Pilsen.

In the summer of 2011, he signed a contract with Beşiktaş. He helped them to win the Turkish Basketball League, Turkish Cup and EuroChallenge. In July 2012, he signed a contract with Galatasaray Liv Hospital. In July 2014, he signed a contract with Turkish team Darüşşafaka.

On November 16, 2017, he signed with Sakarya BB for the rest of the 2017–18 BSL season.

== Personal ==
Dudley is the son of Patricia Dudley and Otis Hunter II. He has a daughter, LaDaisha. In August 2011 he welcomed twins, Talia and Ej. Due to playing with Türk Telekom for three consecutive seasons, Dudley was eligible to apply for Turkish citizenship. On December 17, 2008, his Turkish citizenship became official. The 2009–10 basketball season was his first playing as a Turkish citizen. Dudley currently maintains dual American and Turkish citizenship.
