= Krešimir Lončar =

Croatian basketball player

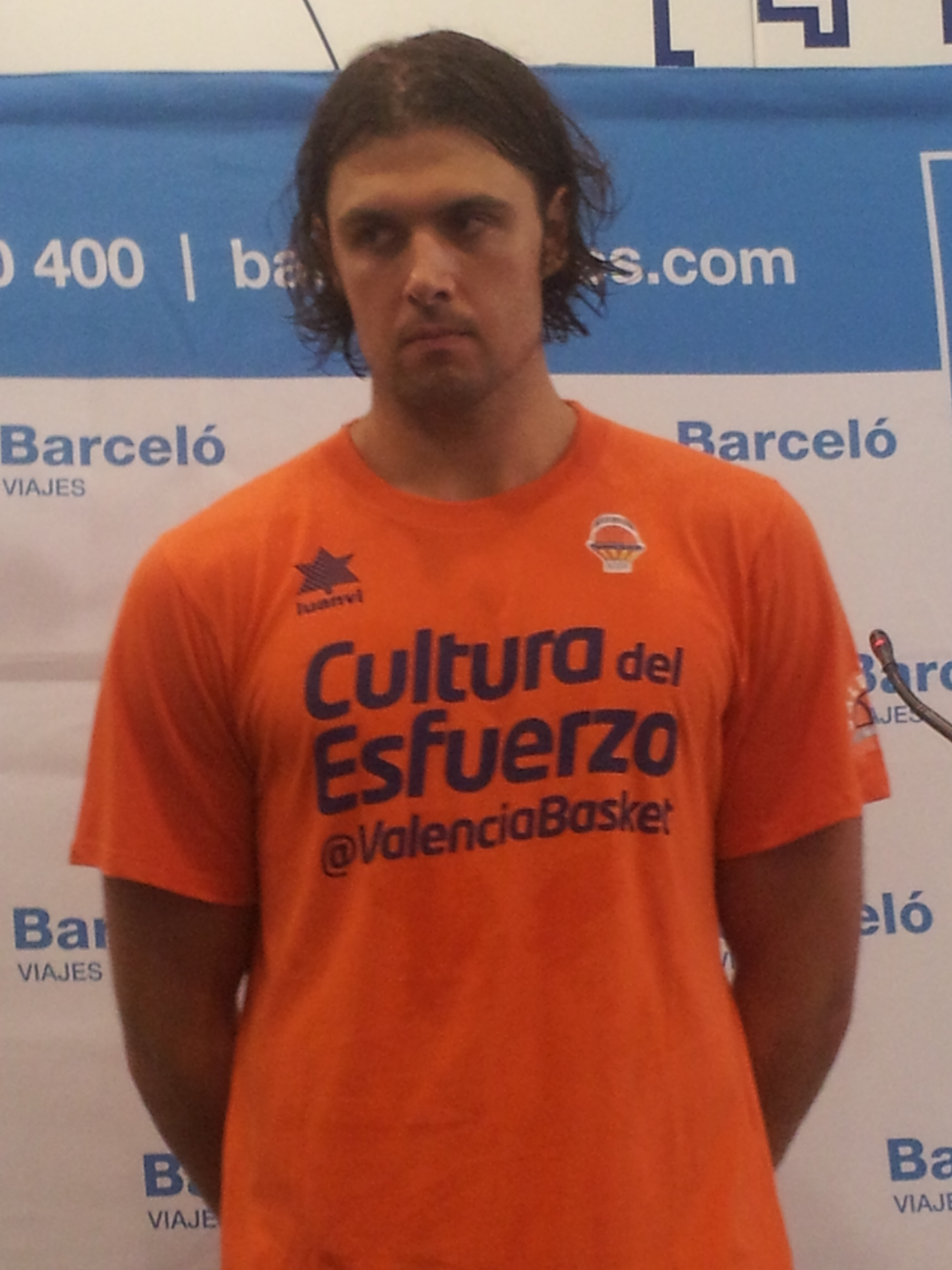
- Lončar in 2014

Würzburg Baskets
- Positions: Manager of sport & scouting
- League: Bundesliga

Personal information
- Born: February 12, 1983 (age 43) Split, SR Croatia, SFR Yugoslavia
- Listed height: 6 ft 10.75 in (2.10 m)
- Listed weight: 251 lb (114 kg)

Career information
- NBA draft: 2005: undrafted
- Playing career: 1999–2020

Career history
- 1999–2000: KK Split
- 2000–2002: DJK s.Oliver Würzburg
- 2002–2003: Benetton Treviso
- 2003–2004: Teramo
- 2004–2006: Kyiv
- 2006–2008: Lokomotiv Rostov
- 2008–2010: UNICS Kazan
- 2010–2014: Khimki
- 2014–2015: Valencia
- 2015–2016: Alba Berlin
- 2016–2020: s.Oliver Würzburg

Career highlights
- Eurocup champion (2012); Italian League champion (2003); Ukrainian SuperLeague champion (2005); VTB United League champion (2011); Russian Cup winner (2009); German Cup champion (2016); Italian Supercup winner (2002); 4× FIBA EuroCup All-Star Day (2005–2008); Russian Cup Final MVP (2009); Russian All-Star (2011)
Medals
Men's basketball
Representing Croatia
World U-21 Championship
Silver medal – second place	2001 Japan	U-21 Team
European U-18 Championship
Silver medal – second place	1998 Bulgaria	U-18 Team
Silver medal – second place	2000 Croatia	U-18 Team

Krešimir Lončar (born February 12, 1983) is a Croatian former professional basketball player, currently working as manager of sport & scouting for s.Oliver Würzburg of the Basketball Bundesliga. Standing at 2.10 m (6 ft 10 1/2 in), he played both the power forward and center positions.

== Professional career ==
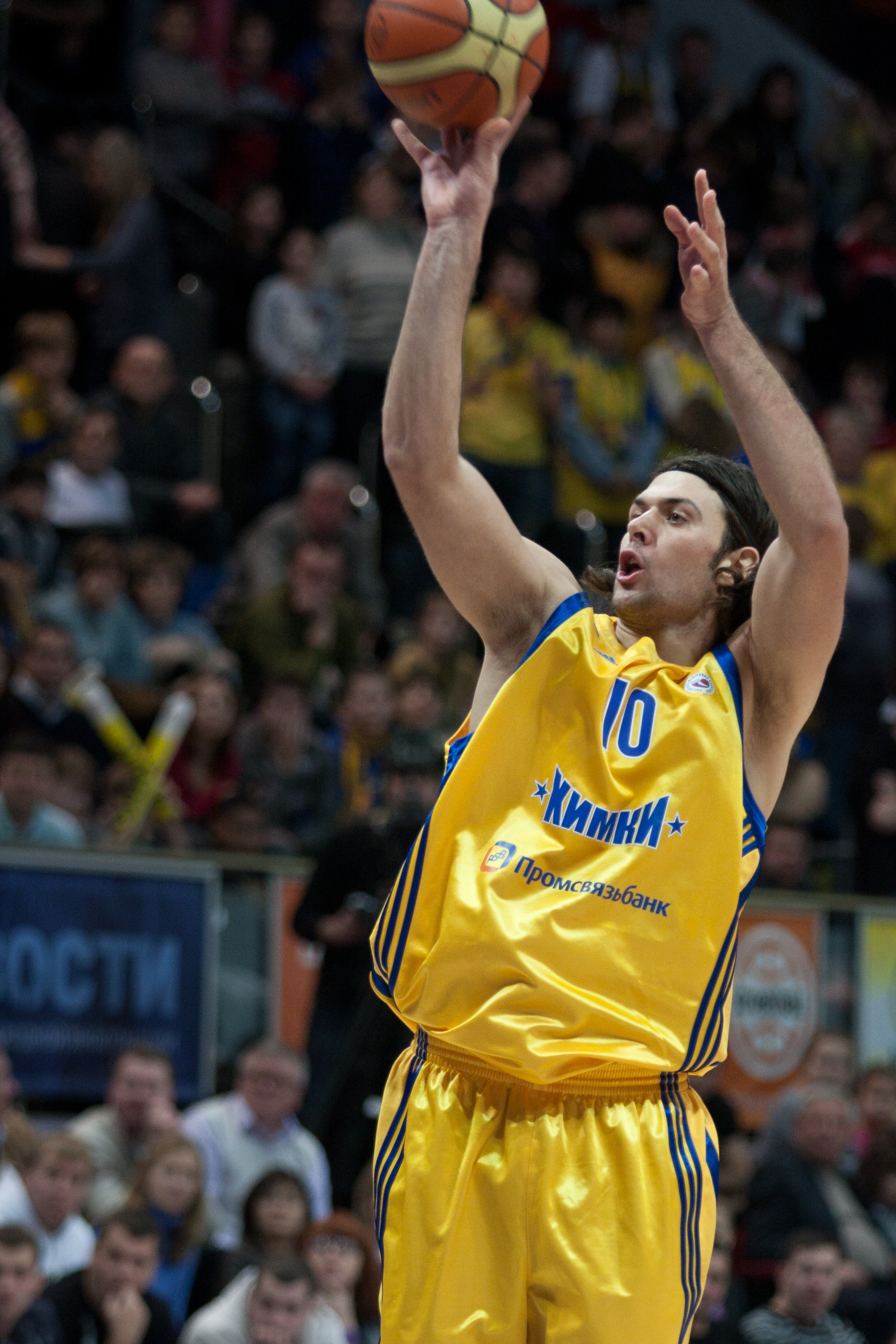
Lončar, playing for Khimki in 2011

In July 2008, Lončar signed a two-year contract with UNICS Kazan. With UNICS he won the Russian Cup in 2009 and was also named the MVP. UNICS Kazan ended up third in the 2009–10 Russian Superleague season.

In June 2010, he signed a two-year deal with BC Khimki. In his first season with BC Khimki he was selected to play the All Star Game 2011. In April 2011, BC Khimki won the championship of VTB United League and Krešimir was voted the best power forward of the tournament. In June 2012, he extended his contract with Khimki for two more seasons.

On 2 July 2014, he signed a two-year deal with Valencia Basket. He left Valencia after one season.

On October 1, 2015, he signed a one-year contract with the German team Alba Berlin.

On June 29, 2016, Lončar signed a two-year deal with s.Oliver Baskets.

On June 28, 2020, Lončar announced that he will continue to work with s.Oliver Würzburg, as director of sports & scouting personnel.

== Croatian national team ==
Lončar was also a member of the Croatian national basketball team. With them he played at the 2008 Olympic Games in Beijing and the Eurobasket 2009 in Poland.

Both at the Olympics and the Eurobasket Croatia ended up sixth. Therefore, they are directly qualified for the 2010 FIBA World Championship in Turkey where Lončar was also part of the Croatian national team.

== Video gallery ==
Words in his presentation as a Valencia Basket player.

Lončar describes himself as a player.

Lončar talks about the return of Valencia Basket into Euroleague for the 2014/15 season.

Lončar analyses the team for the 2014/15 season.

Lončar explains how he decided to join Valencia.
