= Moon Tae-jong =

American basketball player (born 1975)

Moon Tae-jong Jarod Stevenson
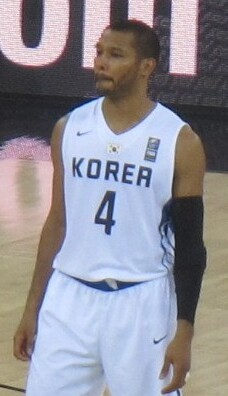
- Moon playing with Korea at the 2014 World Cup

Personal information
- Born: December 1, 1975 (age 50) Seoul, South Korea
- Listed height: 199 cm (6 ft 6 in)
- Listed weight: 96 kg (212 lb)

Career information
- High school: Seventy-First (Fayetteville, North Carolina)
- College: Richmond (1994–1998)
- NBA draft: 1998: undrafted
- Playing career: 1998–2018
- Position: Small forward
- Number: 4

Career history
- 1998–1999: SIG Strasbourg
- 1999–2000: Cholet
- 2000–2001: Connecticut Pride
- 2001: Bnei Hertzliya
- 2001–2002: De Vizia Avellino
- 2002–2004: Bnei HaSharon
- 2004–2005: Lokomotiv Rostov
- 2005–2006: Fenerbahçe
- 2006–2007: UNICS
- 2007–2008: Akasvayu Girona
- 2008–2009: Maroussi Athens
- 2009–2010: Hemofarm Vršac
- 2010–2013: Incheon ET Land Elephants
- 2013–2015: Changwon LG Sakers
- 2015–2018: Goyang Orion Orions
- 2018: Ulsan Hyundai Mobis Phoebus

Career highlights
- South Korean League MVP (2014); Korean Basketball League Best of Five (2011, 2014); FIBA EuroChallenge All-Star Game (2006); All-Greek League Second Team (2009); French 2nd Division Foreign Player's MVP (1999); CAA Player of the Year (1998); First-team All-CAA (1998)
Medals
Men's basketball
Representing South Korea
Asian Games
Gold medal – first place	2014 Incheon
FIBA Asia Championship
Bronze medal – third place	2011 Wuhan

- Moon Tae-jong
- Hangul: 문태종
- Hanja: 文泰鐘
- RR: Mun Taejong
- MR: Mun T'aejong

Moon Tae-jong (Korean: 문태종; Hanja: 文泰鐘; or Cameron Jarod Stevenson; born December 1, 1975) is a South Korean former professional basketball player at the small forward position. He is 1.99 m in height. Moon played at the 2011 FIBA Asia Championship games, representing South Korea. He was head basketball coach at Seaforth High School in Pittsboro, North Carolina until 2024.

== College career ==
Moon played college basketball at the University of Richmond with the Richmond Spiders from 1994 to 1998 and was named Colonial Athletic Association Player of the Year in 1998. He led the Richmond Spiders to an upset of the #3 seeded South Carolina Gamecocks in the NCAA tournament the same year.

== Professional career ==
Moon was named the 1999 French Cup Finals MVP and also played in the 2006 FIBA EuroChallenge All-Star Game.

== National team career ==
Moon was a member of the senior South Korean national team. He won the bronze medal at the 2011 FIBA Asia Championship and the gold medal at the 2014 Asian Games. He also played at the 2014 FIBA World Cup.

== Awards and honors ==
- As awarded by the basketball website Eurobasket.com:

CAAC Player of the Year -98
French Cup Finalist -99
French Cup Finals MVP -99
French Pro B MVP -99
French ProA All-Import Players 2nd Team -00
Israeli Cup Final Four -03
All-Israeli League 2nd Team -03, 04
Israeli Premier League Semifinals -04
Israeli League All-Imports 1st Team -04
FIBA Europe Cup North Conference Finalist -05
FIBA Europe Cup Finalist -05
FIBA Europe Cup Final Four All-Star Team -05
FIBA EuroCup All-Star Game -06 (3-Points Contest Winner)
Turkish Cup Semifinals -06
ULEB Cup Semifinals -07
Russian Cup Finalist -07
Russian A Superleague Regular Season Runner-Up -07
Russian A Superleague Finalist -07
Russian A Superleague All-Newcomers Team -07
Greek League Semifinals -08, 09
All-Greek League Forward of the Year -08
All-Greek League 1st Team -08
Greek A1 League All-Imports Team -08
Greek Cup Semifinals -09
All-Greek A1 League Forward of the Year -09
All-Greek A1 League 1st Team -09
Greek A1 League All-Imports Team -09
Adriatic League Semifinals -10
Korean KBL Regular Season Runner-Up -11
Korean KBL Semifinals -11
All-Korean KBL Forward of the Year -11
All-Korean KBL 1st Team -11
Korean KBL All-Domestic Players Team -11

== Personal life ==
Moon earned his South Korean citizenship in 2011 alongside his brother, Moon Tae-young (born Greg Stevenson), who was also a professional basketball player. The Moon brothers were born to their Korean mother and African American father. His son, Jarin Stevenson, played for him at Seaforth High School before earning a basketball scholarship to the University of Alabama.

== See also ==
- List of foreign basketball players in Serbia
