= Eric Campbell (basketball) =

American basketball player (born 1977)

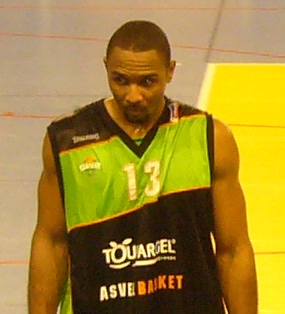

Personal information
- Born: August 22, 1977 (age 49) Thomasville, Alabama
- Listed height: 6 ft 7 in (2.01 m)

Career information
- College: Spring Hill (1995–1999)
- NBA draft: 1999: undrafted
- Playing career: 1999–2012
- Position: Power forward

Career history
- 1999–2002: Elitzur Kiryat Ata
- 2002–2005: Ironi Nahariya
- 2005–2007: Le Mans Sarthe
- 2007–2008: Hapoel Holon
- 2008–2010: ASVEL Basket
- 2010–2011: Hapoel Holon
- 2011: Orléans Loiret Basket
- 2012: Elitzur Netanya

Career highlights
- Israeli League champion (2008); 2× French League champion (2006, 2009); 2× Semaine des As winner (2006, 2010); Semaine des As MVP (2006); 2× French All-Star (2007, 2009); FIBA EuroCup All-Star Day (2004)

Eric Campbell (born August 22, 1977) is an American former professional basketball player. He played college basketball for Spring Hill College.

== Career ==
Campbell began his professional career in 1999 in Israel with Elitzur Kiryat Ata, and played there three seasons. From 2002 to 2005 he played with Ironi Nahariya. In 2005, Campbell signed with Le Mans Sarthe Basket. With them he played for the first time in the Euroleague in the 2006–07 season, and was named MVP of week 2.

In 2007–08 he played with Hapoel Holon. In summer 2008, Campbell signed with ASVEL Villeurbanne, and stayed there for two seasons. In January 2011, he returned to Israel and signed with Hapoel Holon, but played only five games, then signed with Orléans Loiret Basket. In January 2012, he signed with Elitzur Netanya, and stayed there till the end of the season.
