= Demetrius Alexander =

American basketball player

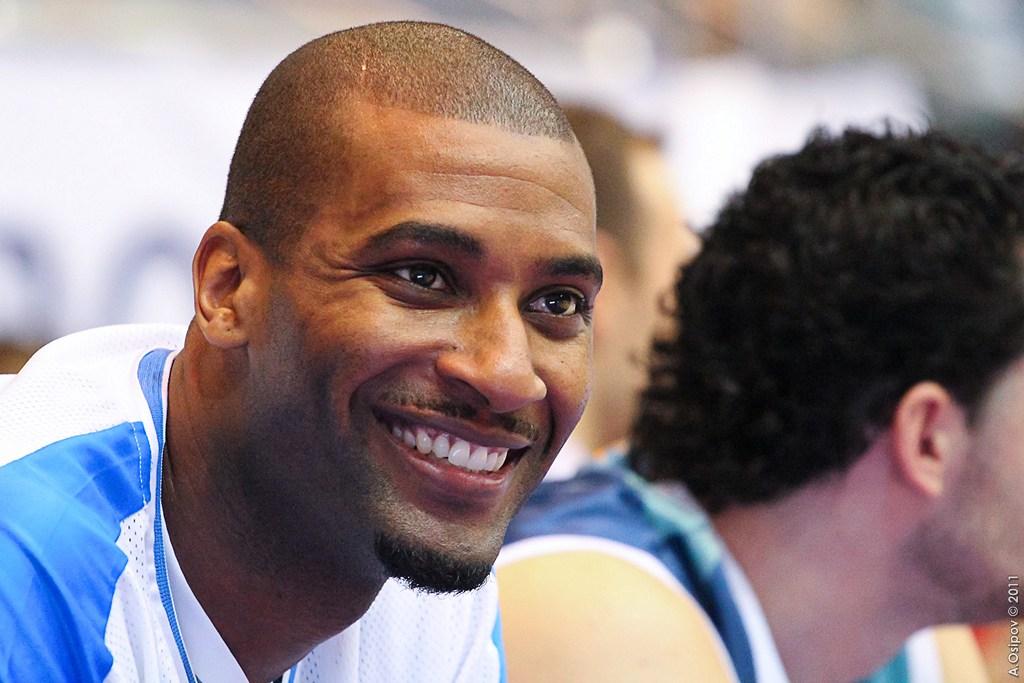

Personal information
- Born: November 3, 1975 (age 51) St. Louis, Missouri, U.S.
- Listed height: 6 ft 9 in (2.06 m)
- Listed weight: 242 lb (110 kg)

Career information
- High school: Hazelwood Central (Florissant, Missouri)
- College: Hutchinson CC (1994–1996); Alabama (1996–1998)
- NBA draft: 1998: undrafted
- Playing career: 1998–2012
- Position: Power forward / center

Career history
- 1998: Atlanta Trojans
- 1998–1999: Idaho Stampede
- 1999: Atlanta Trojans
- 1999–2000: Osaka Helios
- 2000: San Diego Stingrays
- 2000–2001: Hapoel Galil Elyon
- 2001–2002: Hapoel Jerusalem
- 2002–2003: Pallalcesto Amatori Udine
- 2003–2004: Haifa/Nesher BC
- 2004: Baloncesto Fuenlabrada
- 2004–2005: CB Valladolid
- 2005–2006: Changwon LG Sakers
- 2006: Élan Béarnais Pau-Orthez
- 2006–2007: Caja San Fernando
- 2007–2009: Barons/LMT Rīga
- 2009: BC Donetsk
- 2009: Kavala B.C.
- 2010–2011: BC Azovmash
- 2012: Bnei HaSharon
- 2012: St. Louis Phoenix

Career highlights
- Japan Basketball League MVP (2000); Latvian Basketball League MVP (2008); Ukrainian SuperLeague All-Star Game MVP (2009); French League All-Star Game (2006); FIBA EuroCup All-Star Day (2008)

Demetrius Alexander (born November 3, 1975) is an American retired professional basketball player. He played both power forward and center positions.

== College career ==
Alexander played junior college basketball at the Hutchinson Community College before moving to the University of Alabama, where he graduated in 1998.

== Professional career ==
He arrived in Europe in 2000, signing with Hapoel Galil Elyon of the Israeli Basketball Super League. He also played later in Israel with Hapoel Jerusalem B.C. and Haifa/Nesher BC. For the 2002–03 season he signed with Pallalcesto Amatori Udine of the Italian Lega Basket Serie A.

For the 2005–06 season he signed with Changwon LG Sakers of the Korean Basketball League. In April 2006 he signed with Élan Béarnais Pau-Orthez of the French League for the rest of the season.

In the summer of 2006 he signed with Caja San Fernando of the Spanish ACB League for the 2006–07 season. Between 2007 and 2009 he played with Barons/LMT Rīga of the Latvian Basketball League. In February 2009, he signed with BC Donetsk of Ukraine for the rest of the 2008–09 season.

For the 2009–10 season Alexander signed with Kavala B.C. of Greece, but he left them in January 2010, and signed with BC Azovmash of Ukraine. In July 2010, he re-signed with them for one more season. In December 2010, he was named Eurocup MVP for Round 3.

In January 2012, he signed with Bnei HaSharon of Israel. However, he left them after only one game and returned to United States to play with St. Louis Phoenix.

== Awards and accomplishments ==
=== High school ===
- Missouri High School Player of the Year :1994

=== Pro career ===
- FIBA EuroCup Champion: (2008)
- Latvian League Champion: (2007–08)
- Super League Champion: (2009–10)
- Japan Basketball League MVP (2000)
- Latvian Basketball League MVP (2008)
- Ukrainian SuperLeague All-Star Game (2009)
- Ukrainian SuperLeague All-Star Game MVP (2009)
- French League All-Star Game (2006)
- FIBA EuroCup All-Star Day (2008)

== Personal life ==
Alexander's son, Aeneas, is a top-ranked high school basketball player in the class of 2026.
