= Alvin Young =

American professional basketball player (born 1975)

Personal information
- Born: November 12, 1975 (age 51) Brooklyn, New York, U.S.
- Listed height: 6 ft 3 in (1.91 m)
- Listed weight: 182 lb (83 kg)

Career information
- High school: Bishop Loughlin Memorial (Brooklyn, New York)
- College: Mitchell College (1995–1997); Niagara (1997–1999)
- NBA draft: 1999: undrafted
- Playing career: 1999–2016
- Position: Shooting guard / small forward

Career history
- 1999–2000: Esperos Kallitheas
- 2000–2001: Trenton Shooting Stars
- 2001: Florida Sea Dragons
- 2001–2004: Reggiana
- 2004–2005: Bnei HaSharon
- 2005–2006: Strasbourg IG
- 2006: Ironi Nahariya
- 2006–2007: Orlandina
- 2007–2009: Reggiana
- 2009–2010: Pavia
- 2010–2013: Reyer Venezia
- 2013–2014: VL Pesaro
- 2014–2016: UCC Casalpusterlengo

Career highlights
- NCAA scoring champion (1999); MAAC Player of the Year (1999); First-team All-MAAC (1999); Third-team All-MAAC (1998)

Alvin Jerome Young (born November 12, 1975) is an American professional basketball player.

== Early life ==
Young was raised in Brooklyn, New York, where he attended Bishop Loughlin Memorial High School. He learned to play basketball at the church where his mother, Edna, worked. Young tried out for the team every year he was in high school, but in all four years he was cut and did not make the final roster. He graduated high school in 1995.

== College career ==
Unsurprisingly, no NCAA Division I colleges recruited him, so Young attended Mitchell College, a junior college located in New London, Connecticut. and played basketball on its team.

During his sophomore season, Young averaged an NJCAA Tournament record 43.6 points per game over five games, including a high of 54. His head coach, Rich Conover, who was in his first season at the helm, was instrumental in guiding Young to play at Niagara University. Young viewed Conover as an uncle, so he took that advice and enrolled at Niagara the following fall.

The final two seasons of Young's NCAA eligibility were spent playing at the Division I institution. A 6 ft 3 in (1.91 m) shooting guard / small forward, he surpassed all expectations, and as a senior in 1998–99, Young led NCAA Division I in scoring at 25.1 points per game. It was the highest scoring average for a player at Niagara since Hall of Famer Calvin Murphy averaged approximately 29 in 1969–70. Young scored a career high 44 points against Siena, and that season he was named the Metro Atlantic Athletic Conference Player of the Year. He finished his two-year Division I career with 1,152 points, 306 rebounds, 151 blocks and 130 assists.

== Professional athletic career ==
Young was not selected in the 1999 NBA draft, and thus his professional career overseas began.

He played for Strasbourg IG in France.

In 2008–09 and 2009–10, Young played for the Italian club Pallacanestro Reggiana.

As of the 2010–11 basketball season, Young plays for Umana Reyer in Italy. In August 2013, he signed with Scavolini Pesaro.

== See also ==
- List of NCAA Division I men's basketball season scoring leaders
