= Marque Perry =

American basketball player (born 1981)

Personal information
- Born: January 28, 1981 (age 45) Chicago, Illinois, U.S.
- Listed height: 6 ft 1 in (1.85 m)
- Listed weight: 195 lb (88 kg)

Career information
- High school: Prosser (Chicago, Illinois)
- College: Saint Louis (1999–2003)
- NBA draft: 2003: undrafted
- Playing career: 2003–2015
- Position: Point guard
- Number: 4

Career history
- 2003–2004: Roanoke Dazzle
- 2004–2005: Olympiacos
- 2005–2006: Capo D'Orlando
- 2006–2007: Banvitspor
- 2007–2008: CSK VVS Samara
- 2008–2009: Triumph Lyubertsy
- 2009: Donetsk
- 2010: Beşiktaş
- 2010–2011: Union Olimpija
- 2011: Ural Yekaterinburg
- 2011–2012: VEF Rīga
- 2012: Biancoblù Bologna
- 2012–2013: Elitzur Ashkelon
- 2013–2014: İstanbul BB
- 2015: Steaua București
- 2015: BG Göttingen

Career highlights
- All-NBDL First Team (2004); FIBA EuroCup All-Star Day (2007); First-team All-Conference USA (2003)

Marque Perry (born January 28, 1981) is an American professional basketball player who last played for BG Göttingen of the Basketball Bundesliga (BBL). He plays at the point guard position.

== Amateur career ==
Perry, out of Prosser High School, continued the city of Chicago's great point guard tradition. he played college basketball at Saint Louis University. In his final season (2002–03) he averaged 16.8 points, 4.6 rebounds, 3.3 assists and 1.0 steals per game in 31 games. His season-high was 28 points in a 65–57 win over DePaul on February 1, 2003.
