= Curtis Millage =

American basketball player

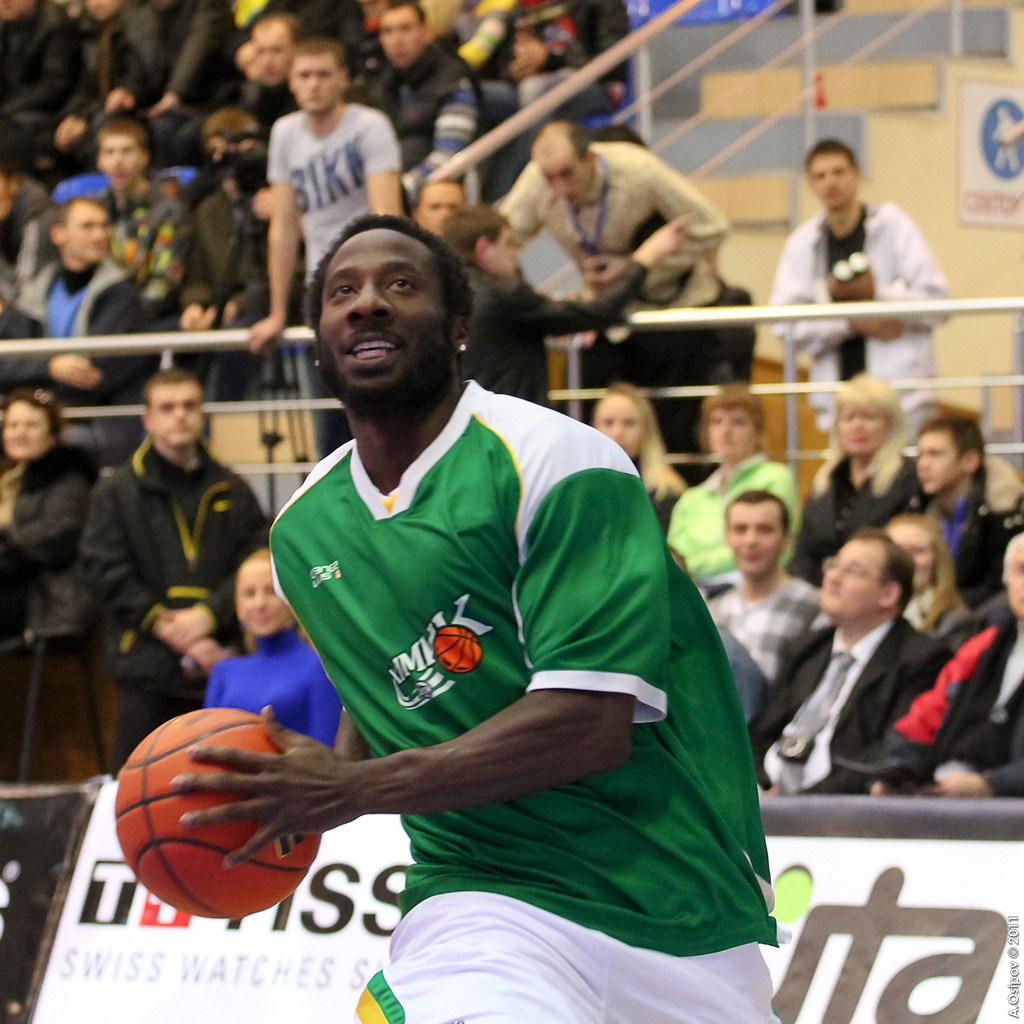
- Millage at the 2011 Superleague All-Star Game

Personal information
- Born: May 4, 1980 (age 46) Los Angeles, California
- Listed height: 6 ft 2 in (1.88 m)
- Listed weight: 195 lb (88 kg)

Career information
- High school: Manual Arts (Los Angeles, California)
- College: L.A. Southwest (1999–2001); Arizona State (2001–2003)
- NBA draft: 2003: undrafted
- Playing career: 2003–2017
- Position: Point guard / shooting guard
- Number: 14, 4, 24

Career history
- 2003–2004: Würzburg Baskets
- 2004: Fayetteville Patriots
- 2004–2005: Utah Snowbears
- 2005–2006: Zhejiang Whirlwinds
- 2006: Split
- 2006–2008: ASK Riga
- 2008–2009: Enisey Krasnoyarsk
- 2009–2010: Union Olimpija
- 2010: Hyères-Toulon
- 2010–2011: BC Khimik
- 2011–2012: VEF Rīga
- 2012: Armia Tbilisi
- 2013: Donetsk
- 2013: Torku Selçuk Üniversitesi
- 2013–2014: BC Kalev/Cramo
- 2014–2015: U-BT Cluj-Napoca
- 2015–2016: Stal Ostrów Wielkopolski
- 2016: Hoops Club
- 2016–2017: AZS Koszalin

Career highlights
- 2× Latvian League champion (2007, 2012); Estonian League champion (2014); Baltic League All-Star (2007); 2× Latvian League All-Star (2007, 2008); Latvian League All-Star Game MVP (2007); Latvian Slam Dunk Contest champion (2007); FIBA EuroCup All-Star Day (2007)

Curtis Millage (born May 4, 1980) is an American professional basketball player for who last played for AZS Koszalin of the Polish Basketball League. He played college basketball for Arizona State. At 6 feet 2 inches (1.88 m) and 195 pounds (88 kg), he usually plays as a point guard, but he also can play as a shooting guard.

== Pro career ==
After finishing his college basketball career at Arizona State, Millage turned pro. He has since played in China, Croatia, Ukraine and Latvia. In the 2006–07 and 2007–08 seasons he played with ASK Riga. In October 2008, he signed a contract for one season with the Russian team Enisey Krasnoyarsk. After one season in Russia he signed with Slovenian club Union Olimpija which plays in Euroleague. In 2009, he signed in Hyères Toulon Var Basket in France. In August 2011 he signed a one-year deal with BK VEF Rīga.

In September 2012, he signed with Armia Tbilisi. In January 2013, he signed with BC Donetsk. In September 2013, he signed with Torku Selçuk Üniversitesi. He parted ways with them in November 2013, after playing only 5 games. In December 2013, Millage signed a one-month deal with BC Kalev/Cramo. In October 2014, he signed with U-BT Cluj-Napoca of Romania.

On November 2, 2016, Millage signed with Hoops Club. On December 15, 2016, he left Hoops Club and signed with Polish club AZS Koszalin.

Millage announced his retirement from basketball in 2017. On July 8, 2019, Millage was hired as head coach of men's basketball for Shadow Mountain High School, following the departure of former NBA player Mike Bibby.
