= Alex Scales =

American basketball player

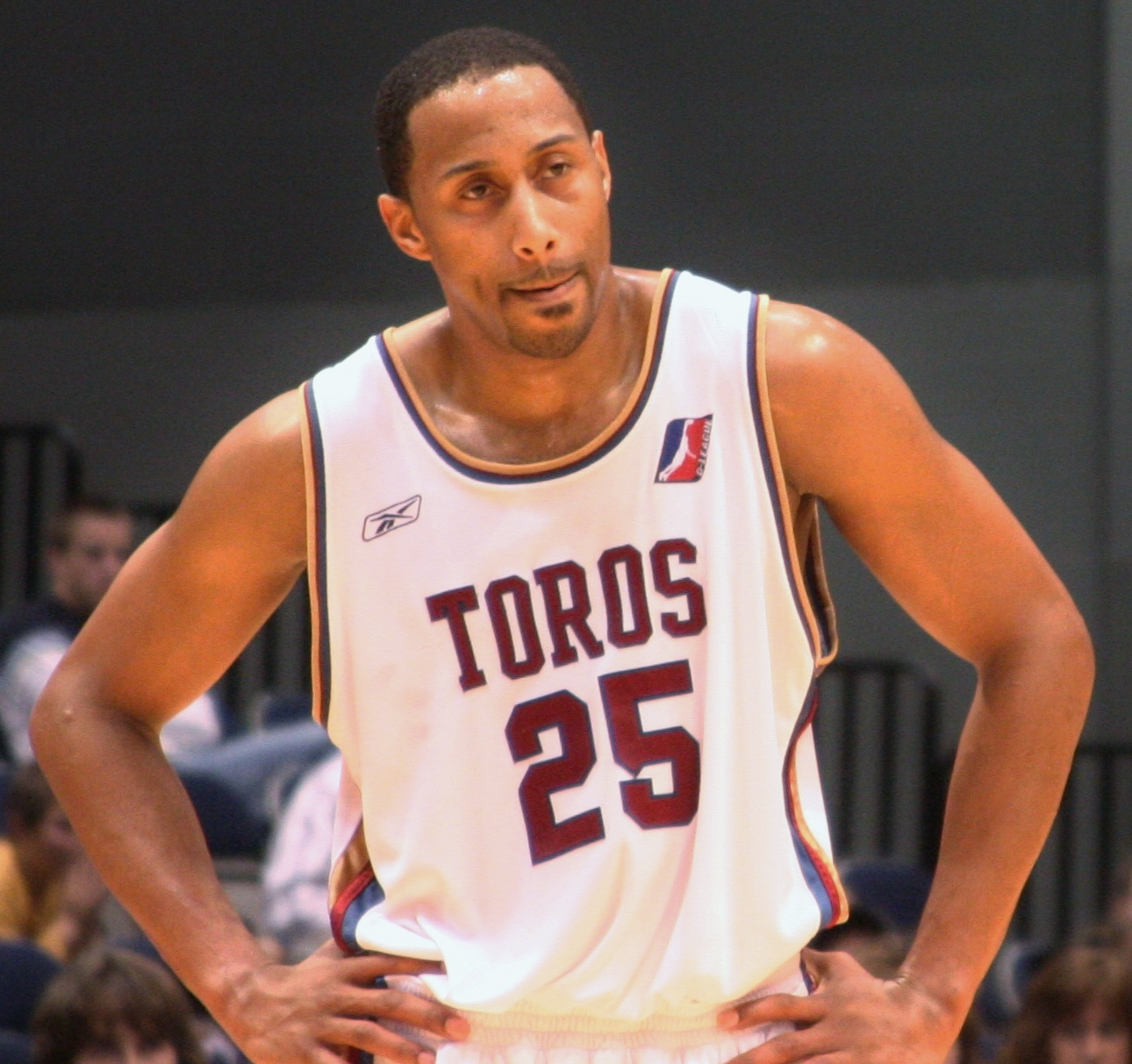
- Scales in 2006 with the Austin Toros

Personal information
- Born: July 3, 1978 (age 48) Racine, Wisconsin, U.S.
- Listed height: 6 ft 4 in (1.93 m)
- Listed weight: 185 lb (84 kg)

Career information
- High school: Racine Lutheran (Racine, Wisconsin)
- College: San Jacinto (1996–1998); Oregon (1998–2000)
- NBA draft: 2000: undrafted
- Playing career: 2000–2017
- Position: Shooting guard
- Number: 25

Career history
- 2000: Basket Livorno
- 2001–2002: Jiangsu Dragons
- 2002: Central Entrerriano
- 2002–2003: Grand Rapids Hoops
- 2003–2004: Shanghai Sharks
- 2004: Huntsville Flight
- 2004–2005: Seoul Samsung Thunders
- 2005: San Antonio Spurs
- 2005–2006: Austin Toros
- 2006: Real Madrid
- 2006–2007: Aris Thessaloniki
- 2007–2008: CSK VVS Samara
- 2008–2009: BC Kyiv
- 2009: Fortitudo Bologna
- 2010: Oyak Renault
- 2010–2011: Mersin BB
- 2012: Atléticos de San Germán
- 2013: Mersin BB
- 2014: Tadamon Zouk
- 2017: Mumbai Challengers

Career highlights
- FIBA EuroCup All-Star Day (2008); All-CBA Second Team (2003)
- Stats at NBA.com
- Stats at Basketball Reference

Alexander Jerome Scales (born July 3, 1978) is an American former professional basketball player.

== Biography ==
Born in Racine, Wisconsin, Scales attended Racine Lutheran High School.

He played at the collegiate level at the University of Oregon.

Scales played in the Continental Basketball Association (CBA) for the Grand Rapids Hoops during the 2002–03 season and earned All-CBA Second Team honors.

Scales has most recently played with Mersin Büyükşehir Belediyesi S.K. and Oyak Renault of the Turkish Basketball League, as well as BC Kyiv of the Ukrainian Basketball SuperLeague and VTB United League. Previously, he was a member of the San Antonio Spurs of the National Basketball Association in 2005. That year, he was also a member of USA Basketball. In the only game Scales played in his NBA career, he substituted for Robert Horry in the final 9.2 seconds of a Spurs game on November 19, 2005. In that game, the Spurs defeated the Phoenix Suns 97–91, with Scales recording no stats.

He was waived by the Spurs nine days later on November 28 but was acquired by the NBA Development League team Austin Toros on December 21, 2005. At 9.2 seconds (0.153 minutes), Scales previously owned the record for fewest minutes played in an NBA career. This record was broken by JamesOn Curry when he played 3.9 seconds (0.065 minutes) in his only NBA game on January 25, 2010, at the end of the third quarter for the Los Angeles Clippers.

He has also been a member of the Seoul Samsung Thunders of the Korean Basketball League, CSK VVS Samara of the Russian Basketball Super League, Aris B.C. of HEBA A1, Real Madrid Baloncesto of the Liga ACB and Euroleague Basketball, and the Jiangsu Dragons and Shanghai Sharks of the Chinese Basketball Association. He was a FIBA EuroCup All-Star during his time with BC Kyiv.

Scales competes for Team 23 in The Basketball Tournament. He was a guard on the 2015 team who made it to the $1 million championship game, falling 67–65 to Overseas Elite.

== Professional career ==
On November 17, 2005, Scales signed an NBA contract with the San Antonio Spurs. Scales played his only NBA game on November 19, logging 9.2 seconds of playing time in a 97-91 victory against the Phoenix Suns.

== Career statistics ==
Legend
GP	Games played	GS	Games started	MPG	Minutes per game
FG%	Field goal percentage	3P%	3-point field goal percentage	FT%	Free throw percentage
RPG	Rebounds per game	APG	Assists per game	SPG	Steals per game
BPG	Blocks per game	PPG	Points per game	**Bold**	Career high

=== College ===
Year	Team	GP	GS	MPG	FG%	3P%	FT%	RPG	APG	SPG	BPG	PPG
1998–99	Oregon	**32**	**31**	29.6	.404	.309	.738	**5.9**	**3.2**	.9	**.8**	14.3
1999–00	Oregon	30	28	**32.0**	**.455**	**.338**	**.780**	4.3	2.5	**1.4**	.4	**16.3**
Career		62	59	30.8	.429	.323	.758	5.1	2.8	1.1	.6	15.3

=== NBA ===
==== Regular season ====
Year	Team	GP	GS	MPG	FG%	3P%	FT%	RPG	APG	SPG	BPG	PPG
2005–06	San Antonio	1	0	.2	–	–	–	.0	.0	.0	.0	.0
