= Steve Goodrich =

American basketball player (born 1976)

Personal information
- Born: March 18, 1976 (age 50) Brussels, Belgium
- Listed height: 6 ft 10 in (2.08 m)
- Listed weight: 220 lb (100 kg)

Career information
- High school: William Penn Charter School (Philadelphia, Pennsylvania)
- College: Princeton (1994–1998)
- NBA draft: 1998: undrafted
- Playing career: 1998–2004
- Position: Power forward / center
- Number: 30, 54

Career history
- 1998: Girona Gavis
- 1999: UB La Palma
- 1999–2000: Baltimore Bayrunners
- 2000–2001: Adecco Milano
- 2001: Chicago Bulls
- 2001–2002: New Jersey Nets
- 2002: StadtSport Braunschweig
- 2002–2003: Darüşşafaka
- 2003–2004: BC Kyiv

Career highlights
- Ivy League Player of the Year (1998)

Career NBA statistics
- Points: 24
- Rebounds: 26
- Assists: 11
- Stats at NBA.com
- Stats at Basketball Reference

Steven Withington Goodrich (born March 18, 1976) is a former National Basketball Association (NBA) player who played center for the Chicago Bulls and New Jersey Nets in the early 2000s. Goodrich averaged 1.1 points per game and 8.7 minutes per game during his NBA career.

== College career ==
Goodrich was born in Brussels in Belgium but he grew up in Philadelphia. After graduating from William Penn Charter High School in Philadelphia, Goodrich played college basketball with the Princeton Tigers. As a center, he led the University to the NCAA tournament the final three years of his career. In the 1996 NCAA tournament, Goodrich would be remembered as the player who passed to Gabe Lewullis, who scored on a lay-up with 3.9 seconds left to eliminate defending national champion UCLA from the tournament. He was named the Ivy League's Player of the Year in 1998 after being named all-conference as a junior. That season, Princeton rode him to a one-loss regular season (to North Carolina) and a No. 5 seed in the East Regional section of the NCAA tournament, where they beat UNLV in the first round. That 1998 team eventually lost to Michigan State University in the second round of the NCAA tournament. Goodrich was not selected in the NBA draft.

== NBA ==
After Goodrich was waived by the Bulls, he was signed days before the 2001-02 NBA season with the New Jersey Nets. This relationship would not last long, as he was cut the following January to make room for free agent signings Anthony Johnson and Donny Marshall. After being cut by the Nets during the 2001-02 NBA season, he returned the next year to the Houston Rockets' training camp; however, he was cut on October 24. For his NBA career, Goodrich averaged 1.1 points (on .321 FG and .556 FT shooting), 1.2 rebounds and 1.1 fouls in 8.7 minutes per game in 21 NBA contests.

== After NBA ==
Goodrich played pro basketball in Spain, Italy, Germany, Turkey, Ukraine and for the Baltimore Bayrunners in the International Basketball League. In Germany, he averaged 14.4 points, 5.8 rebounds, and 3.1 assists in 20 games for StadtSport Braunschweig in 2001–2002. In the Italian A1 league, Goodrich played 24 games for Olimpia Milano, with per game averages of 9.0 points and 3.1 rebounds. He then spent the 2002–2003 season with Darussafaka Istanbul in Turkey. Lastly, he played for BC Kyiv in the Ukrainian league, where he averaged 17.2 points and 7.3 rebounds per game for the Kyiv-based team in the 2003–2004 FIBA Europe League season.

== From basketball to banking ==
Goodrich moved to Los Angeles and enrolled for a graduate degree at UCLA's Anderson School of Management. Goodrich is now based in California, where he works for 1st Century, a bank he helped start, and now serves as Senior Vice President, Product Development & Treasury Management. He has three children with his wife Amy, daughter of U.S. Sen. Tom Harkin of Iowa.
