= Milutin Aleksić =

Serbian basketball player (born 1982)

Personal information
- Born: April 28, 1982 (age 44) Belgrade, SR Serbia, SFR Yugoslavia
- Listed height: 6 ft 8 in (2.03 m)
- Listed weight: 216 lb (98 kg)

Career information
- NBA draft: 2004: undrafted
- Playing career: 2000–2017
- Position: Small forward
- Number: 6, 7, 8, 9, 12

Career history
- 2000–2002: Crvena zvezda
- 2002–2004: Budućnost Podgorica
- 2004: AEL Limassol B.C.
- 2004–2005: Hemofarm
- 2005: AEL Limassol B.C.
- 2005: Spirou Charleroi
- 2005–2008: AEL Limassol B.C.
- 2008–2009: ASK Riga
- 2009–2010: Donetsk
- 2010: AEK Larnaca
- 2011: Panionios
- 2012: PAOK
- 2012: AEL Limassol B.C.
- 2013–2015: Monaco Basket

Career highlights
- 3× FIBA EuroCup All-Star Day (2006–2008)

Milutin Aleksić (Serbian Cyrillic: Милутин Алексић, born April 28, 1982) is a Serbian former professional basketball player.

== Professional career ==
A native of Belgrade, Aleksić began his career with KK Crvena zvezda. He moved to Montenegro in 2002 and spent one season and a half with Buducnost before going on loan to AEL Limassol midway through the 2003–04 season. He played for the following clubs: KK Crvena zvezda, KK Budućnost Podgorica, KK Hemofarm. Also played for PAOK BC (Greece), Spirou Charleroi (Belgium), ASK Riga (Latvia).

He took part in the All-Star Games of FIBA Eurocup. In 2007 was a Capitan of Europe Team. He spent four seasons with Cyprus club Proteas EKA AEL and with this team, he became a champion of Cyprus 3 times. In 2007, he has announced The Best Player of Cyprus Championship. In January 2011, he joined Panionios B.C. in Greece.

In January 2012, he joined PAOK BC.

== See also ==
- List of KK Crvena zvezda players with 100 games played
