= Laurent Sciarra =

French basketball player

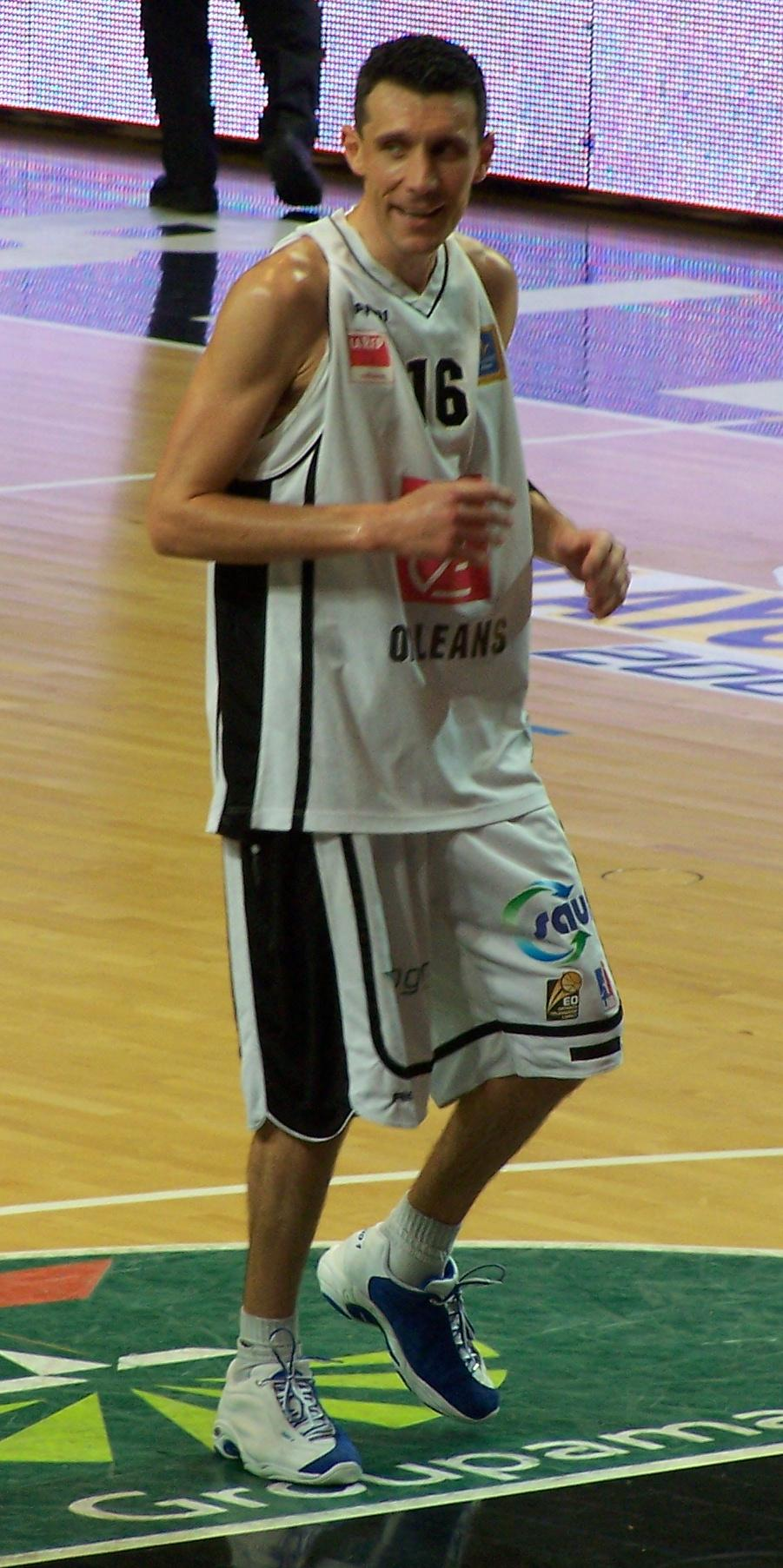
- Sciarra with Orléans Loiret in 2009

Personal information
- Born: 8 August 1973 (age 53) Nice, France
- Listed height: 6 ft 5 in (1.96 m)
- Listed weight: 210 lb (95 kg)

Career information
- Playing career: 1991–2011
- Position: Point guard

Career history
- 1991–1993: Hyères-Toulon
- 1993–1997: PSG Racing
- 1997: Ciudad de Huelva
- 1997–1998: Benetton Treviso
- 1998–2000: PSG Racing
- 2000–2001: ASVEL Villeurbanne
- 2001–2002: Paniónios
- 2002–2004: PB Racing
- 2004–2005: BCM Gravelines
- 2005–2008: JDA Dijon
- 2008–2010: Orléans Loiret
- 2010–2011: Élan Béarnais Pau-Orthez

Career highlights
- Greek League All-Star (2002); French League champion (1997); 4× French Federation Cup winner (2001, 2005, 2006, 2010); French Supercup winner (2006); 2× French League French Player's MVP (2003, 2005); 8× French League All-Star (1999, 2000 (I), 2000 (II), 2002, 2003, 2004, 2006, 2008); French League All-Star Game MVP (2008); French Basketball Hall of Fame (2017); 2× FIBA EuroChallenge All-Star (2004, 2007)
Medals
Men's basketball
Representing France
Olympic Games
Silver medal – second place	2000 Sydney
World Military Championship
Silver medal – second place	1993 Spain
World Military Championship
Bronze medal – third place	1994 Spain
FIBA Under-21 World Cup
Silver medal – second place	1993 Spain	U-20 Team
FIBA European U-18 Championship
Gold medal – first place	1992 Hungary	U-18 Team

Laurent Michel Sciarra (born 8 August 1973) is a former French professional basketball player. He one held a Guinness world record for making 60 free throws in 2 minutes. He was inducted into the French Basketball Hall of Fame in 2017

== Professional career ==
Sciarra began his professional career in 1990, with Hyères-Toulon Var Basket, and he moved to PSG Racing in 1993. He played with PSG until 1997, when he was a member of the club's French League championship season. Sciarra then moved abroad for one season, playing with Ciudad de Huelva in Spain, and Pallacanestro Treviso in Italy, before returning to Paris.

In 2001, Sciarra again moved abroad, and spent a season with Panionios in Greece. Following two more seasons with Paris Basket Racing, Sciarra played with the French club BCM Gravelines, for one season. In 2005, he began to play with the French club JDA Dijon, where he stayed until his transfer to French club Entente Orléanaise 45, in 2008.

== National team career ==
=== French junior national team ===
Sciarra played with France's junior national teams. He played at the 1992 FIBA Europe Under-18 Championship, where he won a gold medal, at the 1993 FIBA Under-21 World Cup, where he won a silver medal, and at the 1994 FIBA Europe Under-20 Championship.

=== French senior national team ===
Sciarra was also a member of the senior men's French national team. With France, he played at the 1997 FIBA EuroBasket, the 1999 FIBA EuroBasket, the 2000 Summer Olympic Games, and the 2001 FIBA EuroBasket. He won the silver medal with France at the 2000 Olympics, and he was the best scorer of the 2000 Olympics final, as he scored 19 points against Team USA.
