= Bekir Yarangüme =

Turkish basketball player

Personal information
- Born: January 28, 1977 (age 49) Aydın, Turkey
- Listed height: 6 ft 6.75 in (2.00 m)
- Listed weight: 210 lb (95 kg)

Career information
- Playing career: 1998–2014
- Position: Small forward

Career history
- 1998–2001: Kombassan Konyaspor
- 2001–2002: TED Kolejliler
- 2002–2004: Türk Telekom
- 2004–2005: Beşiktaş
- 2005–2006: Ülkerspor
- 2006–2007: Bandırma Banvit
- 2007–2010: Türk Telekom
- 2010–2011: Beşiktaş
- 2011–2012: Türk Telekom
- 2012–2013: Olin Edirne
- 2013-2014: Darüşşafaka & Doğuş

Career highlights
- Turkish League Top Scorer (2002)

Bekir Yarangüme (born January 28, 1977) is a Turkish former professional basketball player who last played for Darüşşafaka & Doğuş.
