= Yaniv Green =

Israeli basketball player (born 1980)

Yaniv Green יניב גרין
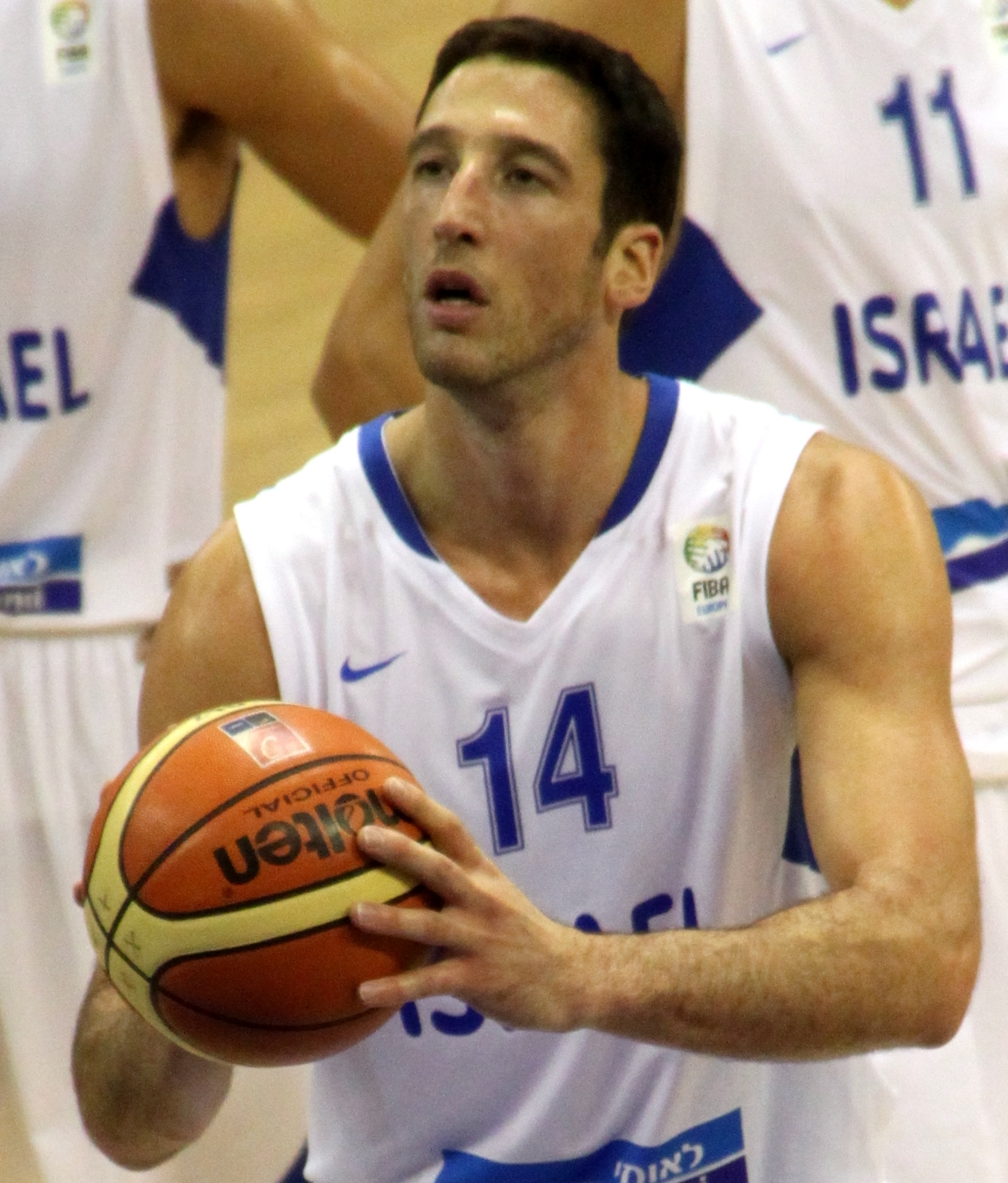
- Green in 2009

Personal information
- Born: 16 May 1980 (age 46) Herzliya, Israel
- Listed height: 2.06 m (6 ft 9 in)
- Listed weight: 113 kg (249 lb)

Career information
- Playing career: 1998–2016
- Position: Center / power forward

Career history
- 1998–2000: Bnei Herzliya
- 2000–2001: Maccabi Ra'anana
- 2001–2002: Bney Herzliya
- 2002–2004: Hapoel Tel Aviv
- 2004–2007: Maccabi Tel Aviv
- 2007–2008: CSK VSS Samara
- 2008–2011: Maccabi Tel Aviv
- 2011–2012: Teramo
- 2012–2013: Hapoel Gilboa Galil
- 2013–2015: Hapoel Jerusalem

Career highlights
- Euroleague champion (2005); EuroBasket rebounding leader (2007)

Yaniv Green (Hebrew: יניב גרין; born 16 May 1980) is an Israeli former professional basketball player. A 2.04 m (6 ft 9 in) forward-center, he is the most capped player in the history of the Israeli national team, with 193 appearances.

== National team career ==
Yaniv was a main factor in the surprising second-place finish of the U-20 Israeli national team at the 2000 FIBA Europe Under-20 Championship. He was also a part of the team that played at the FIBA Under-21 World Championship and finished in 7th place.

Green has played in every European championship, from Eurobasket 2001 to Eurobasket 2015, making a total of 8 championships. At Eurobasket 2007, Green was the leading rebounder, averaging 9.3 rebounds per game. His highest performance was pulling 16 rebounds in a second stage match against Croatia.

On 10 September 2015, Green played his 189th match for the national team, making him the most capped player in Israeli national team history, after passing former leader Doron Jamchi. He also managed to get 1,478 points which placed him in the top 5 of the all-time points leaders of the national side.

== Averages ==
=== 2005-06 ===
Euroleague- 22 Games, 6.3 Minutes, 2.1 Points, 1.0 Rebounds, 0.2 Assists
Ligat Winner- 32 Games, 13.1 Minutes, 5.2 Points, 3.6 Rebounds, 0.8 Assists

=== 2006-07 ===
Euroleague- 19 Games, 7.5 Minutes, 3.0 Points, 2.0 Rebounds, 0.4 Assists
Ligat Winner- 24 Games, 13.3 Minutes, 7.3 Points, 3.5 Rebounds, 0.6 Assists
