= Rubén Wolkowyski =

Argentine/Polish basketball player

Personal information
- Born: September 30, 1973 (age 53) Castelli, Chaco, Argentina
- Listed height: 6 ft 10 in (2.08 m)
- Listed weight: 275 lb (125 kg)

Career information
- NBA draft: 1995: undrafted
- Playing career: 1994–2015
- Position: Center
- Number: 45

Career history
- 1994–1996: Estudiantes de Olavarría
- 1996–1997: Quilmes Mar del Plata
- 1997–1999: Boca Juniors
- 1999–2000: Estudiantes de Olavarría
- 2000–2001: Seattle SuperSonics
- 2001–2002: Quilmes Mar del Plata
- 2002: CSKA Moscow
- 2002: Boston Celtics
- 2003: TAU Cerámica
- 2003–2004: Olympiacos
- 2004–2007: Khimki Moscow
- 2007: Prokom Trefl Sopot
- 2007–2008: Legea Scafati
- 2008–2009: Club Biguá
- 2009: Atléticos de San Germán
- 2009–2011: Libertad de Sunchales
- 2011–2013: La Unión de Formosa
- 2013–2014: Sarmiento de Resistencia
- 2014–2015: Quilmes Mar del Plata

Career highlights
- Argentine League MVP (2000); Argentine League Finals MVP (2000)
- Stats at NBA.com
- Stats at Basketball Reference
Medals
Men's basketball
Representing Argentina
FIBA World Cup
| Silver medal – second place | 2002 USA |
Summer Olympic Games
| Gold medal – first place | 2004 Athens |
FIBA AmeriCup
| Gold medal – first place | 2001 Neuquén |
| Silver medal – second place | 2003 San Juan |
| Silver medal – second place | 1995 Neuquén |
| Bronze medal – third place | 1993 San Juan |
Pan American Games
| Gold medal – first place | 1995 Mar del Plata |

Rubén Oscar Wolkowyski (born September 30, 1973) is an Argentine former professional basketball player, who also holds Polish citizenship. At a height of 2.08 m (6 ft 10 in) tall, he played at the power forward and center positions.

== Professional career ==
Wolkowyski played professionally in Argentina, the United States, Russia, Poland, Spain, and Greece. In 2000, he and Pepe Sánchez became the first Argentines to play in the NBA regular season. Wolkowyski played a total of 41 NBA games and averaged 2 points and 1.1 rebounds per game. His final game being on Christmas of 2002 in an 81 - 117 loss to the New Jersey Nets where he recorded 1 assist, 1 turnover and no other stats in 6 and half minutes of playing time.

On September 29, 2010, Wolkowyski scored 45 points for Libertad de Sunchales in a 118–115 victory over Obras Sanitarias, for the Copa Argentina title. The winner of the game was decided after 4 over-times.

== National team career ==
Wolkowyski defended Argentina to claim the inaugural gold medal at the 1995 Pan American Games in the defeat in the final of the United States, in Mar del Plata, Argentina. He defended Argentina in the win at the 2001 Tournament of the Americas, and at the 2003 FIBA Americas Championships, the 2002 and 2006 FIBA World Championships, and for the gold medal at the 1996 and 2004 Summer Olympics.

== Personal life ==
He played in Russia as a European player, rather than as an Argentine, after Wolkowyski obtained Polish citizenship through his Warsaw-born grandfather, Anatol, who left Poland before World War II, to Argentina via Paraguay. His family spoke Polish at home, but he does not know the language and communicates only in Spanish and English.
