= Andre Hutson =

American basketball player (born 1979)

Personal information
- Born: January 12, 1979 (age 47) Dayton, Ohio, U.S.
- Listed height: 6 ft 8 in (2.03 m)
- Listed weight: 239 lb (108 kg)

Career information
- High school: Trotwood-Madison (Trotwood, Ohio)
- College: Michigan State (1997–2001)
- NBA draft: 2001: 2nd round, 51st overall pick
- Drafted by: Milwaukee Bucks
- Playing career: 2001–2010
- Position: Power forward / center

Career history
- 2001–2002: Basket Napoli
- 2002–2003: Peristeri
- 2003–2004: Maroussi
- 2004–2005: Makedonikos
- 2005–2006: Ural Great Perm
- 2006–2007: Panionios
- 2007–2008: Efes Pilsen
- 2008–2010: Virtus Roma

Career highlights
- All-Greek League Second Team (2004); 2× Greek League All-Star (2005, 2007); Greek All Star Game MVP (2007); NCAA champion (2000)
- Stats at Basketball Reference

Andre Davon Hutson (born January 12, 1979) is an American former professional basketball player. Born in Dayton, Ohio, the 6-foot-8-inch (2.03 m) tall Hutson, played as a power forward and center, during his professional career.

== High school ==
Hutson played high-school basketball at Trotwood-Madison High School, in Trotwood, Ohio.

== College career ==
Hutson played college basketball under Tom Izzo, at Michigan State University, from 1997 to 2001. He was one of the key players of the Michigan State Spartans that won the 2000 NCAA Championship title, against Florida.

== Professional career ==
After his collegiate career, Hutson was a second-round selection by the Milwaukee Bucks in the 2001 NBA draft. Hutson ended up never playing a game in the NBA, making him one of 8 players selected in that year's draft who never appeared in the league.

Hutson then moved to Italy for the 2001–02 season, signed by Basket Napoli. Then moved to Greece for the 2002–03 season, in January 2003, Hutson signed with Peristeri Athens. Signed for the 2003–04 season by Maroussi Athens. Signed for the 2004–05 season by Makedonikos BC. Then moved to Russia for the 2005–06 season, signed by Ural Great Perm. Then back to Greece for the 2006–07 season, signed by Panionios BC. Then moved to Turkey for the 2007–08 season, signed by Efes Pilsen S.K. Then back to Italy for the 2008–09 season, signed by Virtus Roma.
