= Saša Bratić =

Serbian basketball player

Sasa Bratić
Personal information
- Born: 29 August 1981 (age 45) Jagodina, SFR Yugoslavia
- Listed height: 2.03 m (6 ft 8 in)
- Listed weight: 104 kg (229 lb)

Career information
- NBA draft: 2003: undrafted
- Playing career: 1997–2013
- Position: Power forward

Career history
- 1997–1999: Beovuk
- 1999–2001: Crvena zvezda
- 2001–2002: BKK Radnički
- 2002–2003: FMP Železnik
- 2003–2004: Atlas
- 2004–2005: Lavovi 063
- 2005–2007: Hapoel Galil Elyon
- 2007–2009: Khimik
- 2010: Hapoel Holon
- 2010–2011: Maccabi Haifa
- 2011: AEK Larnaca
- 2011–2012: Radnički Kragujevac
- 2012: Feni Industries
- 2013: CSU Piteşti

Sasa Bratić (born 29 August 1981) is a Serbian former professional basketball player. He is a 2.03 m (6 ft 8 in) tall power forward.
