= Brian Cusworth =

American basketball player (born 1984)

Free agent
- Position: Center

Personal information
- Born: March 9, 1984 (age 42) St. Louis, Missouri, U.S.
- Listed height: 7 ft 0 in (2.13 m)
- Listed weight: 255 lb (116 kg)

Career information
- High school: John Burroughs (Ladue, Missouri)
- College: Harvard (2002–2007)
- NBA draft: 2007: undrafted
- Playing career: 2007–2013

Career history
- 2007–2008: Tartu Ülikool
- 2008–2009: CB Breogán
- 2009–2010: Bàsquet Manresa
- 2012: Maine Red Claws
- 2013: ratiopharm Ulm

Career highlights
- KML Most Valuable Player (2008); KML Finals MVP (2008)

Brian Cusworth (born March 9, 1984) is an American former professional basketball player.

== Early life and career ==
Brian Cusworth started playing basketball at the age of nine in 1993 in his hometown St. Louis. After graduating high school he went to study at Harvard University (from which he graduated with a degree in biology in 2006) and played NCAA basketball at Harvard Crimson team for three seasons.

== Professional career ==
In 2007, he went to play in Europe and signed a deal with Estonian top team Tartu Ülikool/Rock. He was one of the team's top performers during the season and helped Rock to FIBA EuroCup semifinals. He also won the Estonian National Championship with the team.

From 2009 to 2011 he played for Bàsquet Manresa which he abandon due to an injury.

On November 1, 2012, Cusworth signed with the Maine Red Claws. On December 3, he was waived by the Red Claws.

In January 2013 he joined and then left Ratiopharm Ulm.

== Achievements ==
- Estonian National Championship 2007–08
- Estonian League Most Valuable Player 2007–08
- Estonian League Finals MVP 2007–08
- Estonian Basketball Cup runner-up 2007–08
- FIBA EuroCup runner-up 2007–08
