= Duane Woodward =

American basketball player

Rhode Island Rams
- Title: Assistant coach
- League: Atlantic 10 Conference

Personal information
- Born: June 4, 1976 (age 50) New York City, New York
- Listed height: 6 ft 3 in (1.91 m)
- Listed weight: 209 lb (95 kg)

Career information
- High school: Benjamin N. Cardozo (Bayside, Queens)
- College: Boston College (1994–1998)
- NBA draft: 1998: undrafted
- Playing career: 1998–2011
- Position: Guard
- Coaching career: 2014–present

Career history

Playing
- 1998–1999: Klosterneuburg
- 1999: Long Island Surf
- 1999–2000: Olympique Antibes
- 2000: Trenton Shooting Stars
- 2000: Long Island Surf
- 2000–2002: BCJ Hamburg
- 2002–2003: AEL Limassol
- 2003: Toros de Aragua
- 2003–2004: AEL Limassol
- 2004: Toros de Aragua
- 2004: Westchester Wildfire
- 2004–2005: Sedima Roseto
- 2005: Gatos de Monagas
- 2005–2006: Montepaschi Siena
- 2006: KK Split
- 2006–2007: Siviglia Wear Teramo
- 2007–2008: AEL Limassol
- 2009–2010: Boca Juniors
- 2010: Al Mouttahed Tripoli
- 2010: FMP Železnik
- 2011: Peristeri

Coaching
- 2014–2018: Monmouth (assistant)
- 2018–2022: Seton Hall (assistant)
- 2022–present: Rhode Island (assistant)

Career highlights
- Third-team All-Big East (1998)

Duane Woodward (born June 4, 1976) is an American former professional basketball player and assistant coach for the Rhode Island Rams. He played most of his career overseas.

== Playing career ==
A four-year starter at Boston College from 1994 to 1998, Woodward was a member of the 1996 and 1997 Eagles team that advanced to the second round of the NCAA tournament. In 1997, Boston College captured Big East regular season and tournament titles and Woodward was named to the Big East All-Tournament team that winter. He capped his collegiate career by earning Second Team All-Big East honors in 1998 when he averaged 15.6 points, 5.1 assists, 4.3 rebounds and 2.1 steals per game.

Following college, Woodward embarked on a 13-year professional career overseas, playing in over 10 different countries. During his tenure in the Cyprus League for AEL Limassol, Woodward helped lead AEL to back-to-back championships in 2003 and 2004. His career accolades include 2004 Eurobasket.com All-FIBA EuropeLeague Player of the Year as well as 2003 and 2004 Eurobasket.com All-Cyprus League Player of the Year honors.

== Coaching career ==
During his playing days, in between his playing stints overseas, Woodward worked as the 16U and seniors/prep coach for AAU team New York Panthers since 2008. He also served as coach and instructor at a number of basketball camps. He then served as an assistant coach at the State University of New York Maritime College, before joining the coaching staff at Queens College as an assistant in 2013, followed by a stint as Assistant Video Coordinator at Fordham’s Men's Basketball coaching staff.

On August 18, 2014, Monmouth hired Duane Woodward as an assistant coach.

On July 2, 2018, Woodward was hired by Seton Hall as assistant coach, replacing Fred Hill.
