= Art Long =

American basketball player (born 1972)

Personal information
- Born: October 1, 1972 (age 54) Rochester, New York
- Listed height: 6 ft 9 in (2.06 m)
- Listed weight: 250 lb (113 kg)

Career information
- High school: East (Rochester, New York)
- College: Dodge City CC (1992–1993); Southeastern CC (1993–1994); Cincinnati (1994–1996)
- NBA draft: 1996: undrafted
- Playing career: 1996–2010
- Position: Power forward
- Number: 00, 35, 42

Career history
- 1996–1997: Élan Béarnais Pau-Orthez
- 1997–1998: Jacksonville Barracudas
- 1998–1998: Quilmes de Mar del Plata
- 1998–1999: Idaho Stampede
- 1999–2000: Yakama Sun Kings
- 2000: Trotamundos de Carabobo
- 2000–2001: ASVEL Villeurbanne
- 2001: Sacramento Kings
- 2001: Brujos de Guayama
- 2001–2002: Seattle SuperSonics
- 2002: Philadelphia 76ers
- 2002–2003: Toronto Raptors
- 2003: Hunstville Flight
- 2003–2004: Ilisiakos Athens
- 2004: San Miguel Beermen
- 2005–2006: Mariupol Azovmash
- 2006–2007: Banvitspor
- 2007–2008: Mahram
- 2008: Petrochimi
- 2009–2010: Indios
- 2009–2010: Unión Alética

Career highlights
- Ukrainian League champion (2006); Ukrainian Cup champion (2006); French Cup champion (2001); CBA blocks leader (2000)
- Stats at NBA.com
- Stats at Basketball Reference

Arthur Donnell Long (born October 1, 1972) is an American former professional basketball player from Rochester, New York. A 6'9", 250 pound power forward out of the East High School and University of Cincinnati who also attended Independence Community Junior College, Dodge City Community College in Kansas and Southeastern Community College in Iowa, Long was not drafted but both the Portland Trail Blazers and Sacramento Kings signed him as a free agent in 1999, though he was waived before ever playing a game for either. He eventually played nine in games with the Kings from February 2001 until the season ended. He spent the majority of his college and pro career at power forward and center but as a high schooler, Long displayed the ability to put the ball on the floor and play small forward.

Long's NBA career lasted 98 games, and enjoyed his most successful year in the 2001-02 season, starting 27 of his 63 games with the Seattle SuperSonics. In 2002–03, he played 26 games (19 with the Philadelphia 76ers, 7 for the Toronto Raptors). He also played 3 preseason games for the Cleveland Cavaliers, but was waived prior to the 2004-05 season.

Long also played in France for ASVEL Lyon-Villeurbanne in 2000–01.
