= Baltimore Bayrunners =

- League: IBL
- Founded: 1999
- Folded: 2000
- History: Baltimore Bayrunners (1999–2000)
- Arena: Baltimore Arena
- Capacity: 11,614
- Location: Baltimore, Maryland
- Team colors: blue, navy, dark green, grey
- Website: www.iblhoops.com/teams/bayrunners (archived on March 11, 2000)

The Baltimore Bayrunners were a professional basketball team in the International Basketball League (IBL) from 1999 to 2000. The Bayrunners were the first professional basketball team in Baltimore, Maryland since the Bullets re-located to Washington, D.C. in 1973. The Memphis franchise of the former American Basketball Association had intended to move to Baltimore for what turned out to be that league's final season, 1975–76, but then folded without playing a game in Baltimore. The Bayrunners were owned in-part by Baltimore Orioles third baseman Cal Ripken.

The Bayrunners played in the 1st Mariner Arena (formerly the Baltimore Arena). The Bayrunners were a charter member of the IBL but lasted only one of the league's two seasons and were not in existence when the surviving IBL teams merged with teams that had moved over to it from the defunct Continental Basketball Association to form a revitalized CBA.
