= Roderick Blakney =

American basketball player (born 1976)

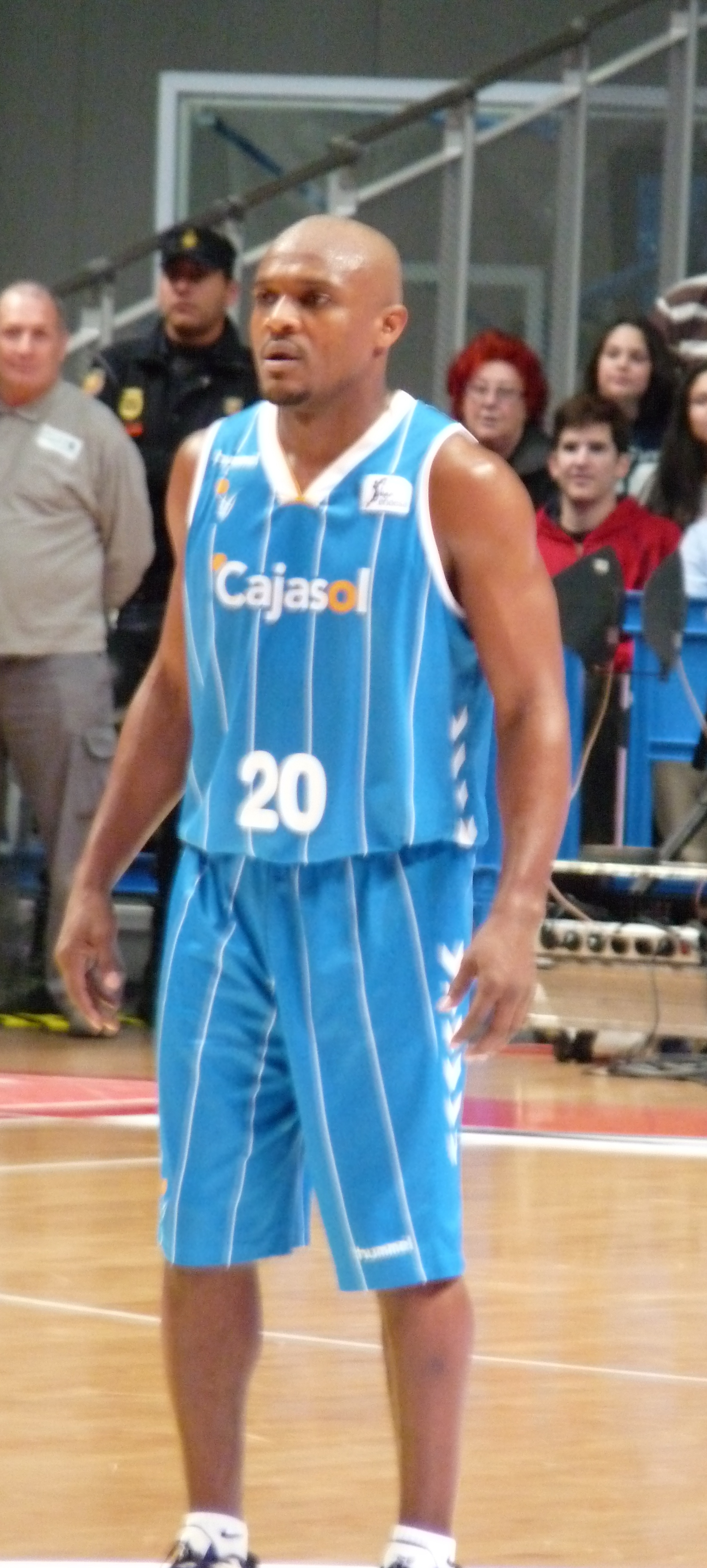

Personal information
- Born: August 6, 1976 (age 50) Hartsville, South Carolina, U.S.
- Listed height: 6 ft 1.25 in (1.86 m)
- Listed weight: 185 lb (84 kg)

Career information
- High school: Hartsville (Hartsville, South Carolina)
- College: South Carolina State (1994–1998)
- NBA draft: 1998: undrafted
- Playing career: 1998–2013
- Position: Point guard

Career history
- 1998: Sioux Falls Skyforce
- 1998–1999: Dakota Wizards
- 1999–2001: Cincinnati Stuff
- 2001: Los Prados
- 2001–2002: Iraklis
- 2002–2003: AEK Athens
- 2003–2006: Maroussi
- 2006–2007: Dynamo Moscow
- 2007–2008: Olympiacos
- 2008–2009: Türk Telekom
- 2009–2010: Panellinios
- 2010–2011: Unicaja Málaga
- 2011–2012: Lokomotiv Kuban
- 2012–2013: Cajasol Sevilla

Career highlights
- 2× All-Greek League Team (2004, 2006); Greek Cup Finals Top Scorer (2006); Greek All-Star (2006); IBA Rookie Of The Year (1998–99); MEAC Player of the Year (1997)

Roderick Bertrand Blakney (born August 6, 1976) is an American-born naturalized Bulgarian former professional basketball player.

== College career ==
Blakney, a 6 ft 1 1/4 in (1.86 m) point guard played college basketball at South Carolina State University, averaging 20.6 points, 5.1 rebounds, and 4.7 assists in his senior year during the 1997–98 season.

== Professional career ==
Since college, Blakney has played for numerous teams, including Greek League clubs such as Iraklis Thessaloniki (2001–02), AEK Athens (2002–03), Maroussi (2003–06), Olympiacos Piraeus (2007–08). He has also played with the Russian Superleague club Dynamo Moscow during the 2006–07 season.

In 2008, he joined the Turkish League team Türk Telekom. In 2009, he moved to Panellinios.

In November 2010 he signed a two-month contract with Unicaja Málaga in Spain, that was later extended until the end of the 2010–11 season.

In October 2011 he signed with Lokomotiv Kuban in Russia. In December 2012, he returned to Spain and signed with Cajasol Sevilla until the end of the season.

== National team career ==
Blakney was also a member of the senior Bulgarian national basketball team.
