= Arvydas Čepulis =

Lithuanian basketball player (born 1979)

Arvydas Cepulis
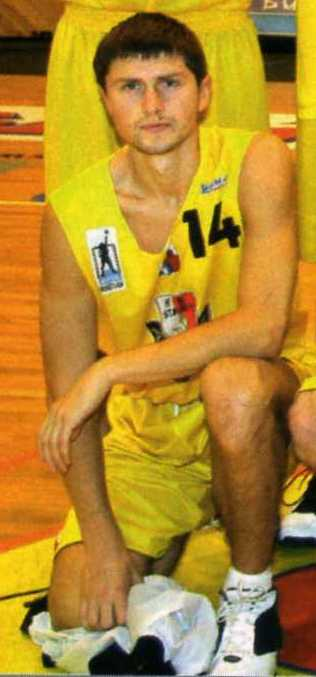

Free agent
- Position: Small forward

Personal information
- Born: October 23, 1979 (age 47) Šiauliai, Lithuanian
- Listed height: 6 ft 5 in (1.96 m)
- Listed weight: 195 lb (88 kg)

Career information
- NBA draft: 1999: undrafted
- Playing career: 1997–present

Career history
- 1997–2000: BC Šiauliai
- 2000–2001: BC Policija-Gubernija
- 2001–2005: BC Šiauliai
- 2005–2006: Astoria Bydgoszcz
- 2006–2007: BC Šiauliai
- 2007–2010: CSU Ploiești
- 2010: BC Šiauliai
- 2012–2013: BC Juventus

Arvydas Čepulis (born October 23, 1979) is a Lithuanian basketball player.

== Honours ==
- LKL Three-point Shootout champion (2017)
