= Jim Cantamessa =

American-French basketball player and coach

Personal information
- Born: May 25, 1978 (age 48)
- Listed height: 6 ft 8 in (2.03 m)
- Listed weight: 235 lb (107 kg)

Career information
- High school: Blackhawk (Chippewa Township, Pennsylvania)
- College: Siena (1996–2000)
- Playing career: 2000–2008
- Position: Forward
- Coaching career: 2010–present

Career history

Playing
- 2000–2001: Rouen
- 2001–2002: FC Porto
- 2002–2003: s.Oliver Würzburg
- 2003–2004: Reims Champagne Basket
- 2004–2007: Euphony Bree
- 2007–2008: Dexia Mons-Hainaut

Coaching
- 2010–2015: Greensboro (assistant)
- 2015–2019: Greensboro (associate HC)
- 2019–2023: Greensboro

Career highlights
- Belgium League championship (2005)

James Francis Cantamessa (born May 25, 1978) is an American-French basketball coach and former player. Following his college career at Siena College he went on to play professionally in Europe where he won the Belgium championship in 2005.

== High school career ==
Cantamessa attended Blackhawk High School in Chippewa Township, Pennsylvania, where he starred at basketball.

== College career ==
Cantamessa, a 6'8'' forward out of Beaver Falls, Pennsylvania, played college basketball at Siena College from 1996 to 2000, averaging 11.0 points per game over his four years and scoring a total of 1,316 points. He received All-MAAC Second Team honors in 1998 and All-MAAC Third Team honors in 1999 and 2000. He graduated from Siena College with a degree in business finance. In December 1998, he scored a career high 33 points in a win against George Washington.

== Professional career ==
Cantamessa, who also holds a French passport, kicked off his pro career in the 2000–01 campaign with Rouen in the French second division. He played for FC Porto in Portugal and in the European cup competition FIBA Korać Cup during the 2001–02 season.

Afterwards, Cantamessa played in the German Basketball Bundesliga with s.Oliver Würzburg (2002–03), Reims Champagne Basket in the French topflight ProA (2003–04), Euphony Bree (2004–2007) as well as Dexia Mons-Hainaut (2007–08) in Belgium. In 2005, he won the Belgium championship with Bree. He also saw action in the ULEB Cup and the EuroCup with Bree and Mons-Hainaut respectively.

== Coaching career ==
Cantamessa was named assistant coach of Greensboro College's men's basketball team in 2010, associate head coach in 2015 and head coach in 2019. He was also named head men's golf coach at Greensboro. Cantamessa stayed at Greensboro until 2023.
