= List of 2017–18 EuroLeague transactions =

This is a list of all personnel changes for the 2017 EuroLeague off-season and 2017–18 EuroLeague season (until 28 February 2018).

== Retirements ==
The following players who played in the 2016–17 Euroleague, and played more than three EuroLeague seasons, retired.

Date	Name	EuroLeague Team(s) and played (years)	Age	Notes	Ref.
June 8	(Lithuania) Robertas Javtokas	(Lithuania) Lietuvos rytas (2005–2006); (Greece) Panathinaikos (2006–2007); (Russia) Khimki (2009–2010); (Spain) Valencia (2010–2011); (Lithuania) Žalgiris (2011–2017)	37	1× EuroLeague champion	
August 2	(Greece) Antonis Fotsis	(Greece) Panathinaikos (2002–2003; 2008–2011; 2013–2017); (Spain) Real Madrid (2004–2005); (Russia) Dynamo Moscow (2006–2007); (Italy) Emporio Armani (2011–2013)	36	3× EuroLeague champion	
September 27	(United States) Devin Smith	(Turkey) Fenerbahçe (2008–2009); (Israel) Maccabi (2011–2017)	34	1× EuroLeague champion; 1× All-EuroLeague Second Team	

== Managerial changes ==
Team	Outgoing manager	Manner of departure	Date of vacancy	Position in table	Replaced with	Date of appointment
(Spain) FC Barcelona Lassa	(Greece) Georgios Bartzokas	Sacked	7 June 2017	Pre-season	(Spain) Sito Alonso	16 June 2017
(Spain) Baskonia	(Spain) Sito Alonso	Mutual consent	16 June 2017	Pre-season	(Argentina) Pablo Prigioni	16 June 2017
(Spain) Valencia Basket	(Spain) Pedro Martínez	End of contract	20 June 2017	Pre-season	(Spain) Txus Vidorreta	20 June 2017
(Israel) Maccabi Tel Aviv	(Latvia) Ainars Bagatskis	Sacked	16 May 2017	Pre-season	(Croatia) Neven Spahija	26 June 2017
(Italy) EA7 Emporio Armani Milan	(Croatia) Jasmin Repeša	Mutual consent	3 June 2017	Pre-season	(Italy) Simone Pianigiani	26 June 2017
(Russia) Khimki	(Montenegro) Duško Ivanović	Mutual consent	29 June 2017	Pre-season	(Greece) Georgios Bartzokas	30 June 2017
(Serbia) Crvena zvezda mts	(Montenegro) Dejan Radonjić	End of contract	15 July 2017	Pre-season	(Serbia) Dušan Alimpijević	21 July 2017
(Spain) Baskonia	(Argentina) Pablo Prigioni	Resigned	25 October 2017	16th (0–3)	(Spain) Pedro Martínez	27 October 2017
(Turkey) Anadolu Efes	(Croatia) Velimir Perasović	Sacked	16 December 2017	15th (3–9)	(Turkey) Ergin Ataman	18 December 2017
(Spain) FC Barcelona Lassa	(Spain) Sito Alonso	Sacked	4 February 2018	13th (7–14)	(Serbia) Svetislav Pešić	9 February 2018
(Germany) Brose Bamberg	(Italy) Andrea Trinchieri	Sacked	19 February 2018	13th (8–14)	(Italy) Luca Banchi	4 March 2018

== Player movements ==
=== Between two EuroLeague teams ===
Date	Player	From	To	Contract years	Ref.
June 7	(United States) Ricky Ledo	(Spain) Baskonia	(Turkey) Anadolu Efes	2	
June 20	(Latvia) Jānis Strēlnieks	(Germany) Brose Bamberg	(Greece) Olympiacos	2	
June 21	(France) Léo Westermann	(Lithuania) Žalgiris	(Russia) CSKA Moscow	1+1	
June 22	(France) Thomas Heurtel	(Turkey) Anadolu Efes	(Spain) Barcelona	2	
June 29	(Serbia) Luka Mitrović	(Serbia) Crvena zvezda	(Germany) Brose Bamberg	3	
June 29	(United States) Charles Jenkins	(Serbia) Crvena zvezda	(Russia) Khimki	2	
June 29	(Lithuania) Lukas Lekavičius	(Lithuania) Žalgiris	(Greece) Panathinaikos	2	
June 29	(Australia) Brock Motum	(Lithuania) Žalgiris	(Turkey) Anadolu Efes	1+1	
July 2	(France) Kim Tillie	(Spain) Baskonia	(Greece) Olympiacos	2	
July 5	(Italy) Daniel Hackett	(Greece) Olympiacos	(Germany) Brose Bamberg	2	
July 8	(Italy) Nicolò Melli	(Germany) Brose Bamberg	(Turkey) Fenerbahçe	3	
July 9	(Croatia) Krunoslav Simon	(Italy) AX Olimpia Milan	(Turkey) Anadolu Efes	1+1	
July 10	(United States) Andrew Goudelock	(Israel) Maccabi Tel Aviv	(Italy) AX Olimpia Milan	1	
July 10	(United States) Patric Young	(Greece) Olympiacos	(Italy) AX Olimpia Milan	1	
July 12	(United States) Jamel McLean	(Italy) AX Olimpia Milan	(Greece) Olympiacos	2	
July 13	(United States) Othello Hunter	(Spain) Real Madrid	(Russia) CSKA Moscow	2	
July 14	(Serbia) Marko Gudurić	(Serbia) Crvena zvezda	(Turkey) Fenerbahçe	4	
July 14	(Georgia (country)) Ricky Hickman	(Italy) AX Olimpia Milan	(Germany) Brose Bamberg	2	
July 14	(United States) Tyler Honeycutt	(Turkey) Anadolu Efes	(Russia) Khimki	1	
July 14	(Spain) Pierre Oriola	(Spain) Valencia	(Spain) Barcelona	4	
July 17	(United States) Deshaun Thomas	(Turkey) Anadolu Efes	(Israel) Maccabi Tel Aviv	1+1	
July 21	(United States) Erick Green	(Greece) Olympiacos	(Spain) Valencia	1	
July 21	(Australia) Jonah Bolden	(Serbia) Crvena zvezda	(Israel) Maccabi Tel Aviv	3	
July 25	(France) Fabien Causeur	(Germany) Brose Bamberg	(Spain) Real Madrid	2	
July 26	(Serbia) Ognjen Kuzmić	(Serbia) Crvena zvezda	(Spain) Real Madrid	2	
July 28	(United States) Quincy Miller	(Israel) Maccabi Tel Aviv	(Germany) Brose Bamberg	1+1	
July 31	(United States) Rakim Sanders	(Italy) AX Olimpia Milan	(Spain) Barcelona	1	
August 2	(Dominican Republic) James Feldeine	(Greece) Panathinaikos	(Serbia) Crvena zvezda	2	
August 3	(United States) James Augustine	(Russia) CSKA Moscow	(Spain) Unicaja	1	
August 12	(Belgium) Matt Lojeski	(Greece) Olympiacos	(Greece) Panathinaikos	1	
August 16	(Uruguay) Jayson Granger	(Turkey) Anadolu Efes	(Spain) Baskonia	3	
August 22	(Hungary) Ádám Hanga	(Spain) Baskonia	(Spain) Barcelona	3	
September 11	(North Macedonia) Pero Antić	(Turkey) Fenerbahçe	(Serbia) Crvena zvezda	1	
November 21	(Slovenia) Zoran Dragić	(Italy) AX Olimpia Milan	(Turkey) Anadolu Efes	1	
December 9	(Serbia) Dejan Musli	(Spain) Unicaja	(Germany) Brose Bamberg	1	

=== To a EuroLeague team ===
Date	Player	From	To	Contract years	Ref.
June 8	(Latvia) Jānis Timma	(Russia) Zenit	(Spain) Baskonia	3	
June 10	(Australia) Jonah Bolden	(Serbia) FMP	(Serbia) Crvena zvezda	2	
June 13	(United States) Aaron White	(Russia) Zenit	(Lithuania) Žalgiris	1+1	
June 14	(France) Vincent Poirier	(France) Paris-Levallois	(Spain) Baskonia	3	
June 15	(Serbia) Vasilije Micić	(Turkey) Tofaş	(Lithuania) Žalgiris	1+1	
June 19	(Iceland) Tryggvi Hlinason	(Iceland) Þór Akureyri	(Spain) Valencia	4	
June 19	(Serbia) Ranko Simović	From youth team	(Serbia) Crvena zvezda	4	
June 20	(United States) Will Clyburn	(Turkey) Darüşşafaka	(Russia) CSKA Moscow	2	
June 21	(Israel) John DiBartolomeo	(Israel) Maccabi Haifa	(Israel) Maccabi Tel Aviv	3	
June 22	(Israel) Alex Tyus	(Turkey) Galatasaray	(Israel) Maccabi Tel Aviv	2	
June 23	(Serbia) Stefan Marković	(Russia) Zenit	(Russia) Khimki	2	
June 23	(United States) Brandon Davies	(France) Monaco	(Lithuania) Žalgiris	1+1	
June 25	(United States) Bryce Taylor	(Germany) Bayern Munich	(Germany) Brose Bamberg	3	
June 25	(United States) Royce O'Neale	(Spain) Herbalife Gran Canaria	(Lithuania) Žalgiris	1+1	
June 27	(Canada) Aaron Doornekamp	(Spain) Iberostar Tenerife	(Spain) Valencia	2	
June 27	(Israel) Jake Cohen	(Israel) Maccabi Ashdod	(Israel) Maccabi Tel Aviv	2	
June 30	(Russia) Andrey Zubkov	(Russia) Lokomotiv Kuban	(Russia) Khimki	2	
June 30	(Greece) Georgios Bogris	(Spain) Iberostar Tenerife	(Greece) Olympiacos	3	
June 30	(Greece) Zach Auguste	(Turkey) Uşak Sportif	(Greece) Panathinaikos	1	
July 2	(Bulgaria) Dee Bost	(France) Monaco	(Lithuania) Žalgiris	1	
July 2	(United States) Augustine Rubit	(Germany) ratiopharm Ulm	(Germany) Brose Bamberg	3	
July 3	(Tunisia) Michael Roll	(Turkey) Beşiktaş	(Israel) Maccabi Tel Aviv	1	
July 3	(Spain) Santiago Yusta	(Spain) Obradoiro	(Spain) Real Madrid	2	
July 3	(Turkey) Sinan Güler	(Turkey) Galatasaray	(Turkey) Fenerbahçe	2	
July 4	(Serbia) Dragan Milosavljević	(Germany) Alba Berlin	(Spain) Unicaja	2	
July 4	(Greece) Ian Vougioukas	(Russia) Lokomotiv Kuban	(Greece) Panathinaikos	2	
July 6	(Georgia (country)) Giorgi Shermadini	(Spain) MoraBanc Andorra	(Spain) Unicaja	2	
July 8	(Spain) Andres Rico	(Spain) Gipuzkoa Basket	(Spain) Valencia	2	
July 9	(Israel) Karam Mashour	(Israel) Bnei Herzliya	(Israel) Maccabi Tel Aviv	2+1	
July 10	(Latvia) Dairis Bertāns	(Turkey) Darüşşafaka	(Italy) AX Olimpia Milan	1	
July 10	(France) Amath M'Baye	(Italy) New Basket Brindisi	(Italy) AX Olimpia Milan	1	
July 10	(Serbia) Vladimir Micov	(Turkey) Galatasaray	(Italy) AX Olimpia Milan	1	
July 11	(Finland) Sasu Salin	(Spain) Gran Canaria	(Spain) Unicaja	2	
July 11	(Greece) Thanasis Antetokounmpo	(Spain) MoraBanc Andorra	(Greece) Panathinaikos	2	
July 11	(Turkey) Birkan Batuk	(Turkey) Darüşşafaka	(Turkey) Anadolu Efes	2	
July 12	(United States) Josh Adams	(Russia) Avtodor Saratov	(Turkey) Anadolu Efes	1+1	
July 12	(United States) Marcus Denmon	(Turkey) Gaziantep	(Greece) Panathinaikos	1+1	
July 12	(France) Adrien Moerman	(Turkey) Darüşşafaka	(Spain) Barcelona	1	
July 13	(United States) Anthony Gill	(Turkey) Yeşilgiresun	(Russia) Khimki	2	
July 14	(United States) Errick McCollum	(Turkey) Galatasaray	(Turkey) Anadolu Efes	1+1	
July 14	(United States) Pierre Jackson	(United States) Texas Legends	(Israel) Maccabi Tel Aviv	1+1	
July 15	(North Macedonia) Jordan Theodore	(Turkey) Banvit	(Italy) AX Olimpia Milan	2	
July 16	(United States) James Anderson	(Turkey) Darüşşafaka	(Russia) Khimki	2	
July 16	(United States) Cory Jefferson	(Philippines) Alaska Aces	(Italy) AX Olimpia Milan	1	
July 17	(Spain) Sergio Rodríguez	(United States) Philadelphia 76ers	(Spain) Real Madrid	2+1	
July 19	(United States) Latavious Williams	(Venezuela) Bucaneros de La Guaira	(Spain) Valencia	1	
July 20	(United States) Malcolm Thomas	(China) Jilin Northeast Tigers	(Russia) Khimki	2	
July 21	(Russia) Ivan Viktorov	(Russia) Nizhny Novgorod	(Russia) Khimki	2	
July 24	(United States) Brian Roberts	(United States) Charlotte Hornets	(Greece) Olympiacos	2	
July 25	(Hungary) DeAndre Kane	(Spain) Real Betis	(Israel) Maccabi Tel Aviv	1+1	
July 25	(Brazil) Marcelo Huertas	(United States) Los Angeles Lakers	(Spain) Baskonia	2	
July 27	(United States) Phil Pressey	(United States) Santa Cruz Warriors	(Spain) Barcelona	1+1	
July 27	(France) Axel Toupane	(United States) New Orleans Pelicans	(Lithuania) Žalgiris	1+1	
July 28	(Italy) Marco Cusin	(Italy) Sidigas Avellino	(Italy) AX Olimpia Milan	1+1	
July 28	(Serbia) Marko Kešelj	(Belgium) Oostende	(Serbia) Crvena zvezda	2	
July 28	(Germany) Tibor Pleiß	(Turkey) Galatasaray	(Spain) Valencia	2	
July 29	(Serbia) Stefan Janković	(United States) Lakeland Magic	(Serbia) Crvena zvezda	3	
July 29	(Serbia) Nikola Jovanović	(United States) Westchester Knicks	(Serbia) Crvena zvezda	3	
July 30	(Greece) Dinos Mitoglou	(United States) Wake Forest	(Greece) Panathinaikos	4	
July 30	(United States) Jason Thompson	(China) Shandong Golden Stars	(Turkey) Fenerbahçe	1	
August 1	(United States) Ray McCallum Jr.	(United States) Grand Rapids Drive	(Spain) Unicaja	1	
August 1	(Serbia) Nikola Radičević	(Spain) Real Betis Energía Plus	(Serbia) Crvena zvezda	3	
August 4	(France) Kevin Séraphin	(United States) Indiana Pacers	(Spain) Barcelona	2	
August 10	(United States) Hollis Thompson	(United States) Austin Spurs	(Greece) Olympiacos	1	
August 11	(France) Mathias Lessort	(France) Nanterre 92	(Serbia) Crvena zvezda	3	
August 14	(Russia) Alan Makiev	(Russia) Avtodor Saratov	(Russia) CSKA Moscow	1	
August 15	(United States) Norris Cole	(United States) Oklahoma City Thunder	(Israel) Maccabi Tel Aviv	1	
August 20	(United States) Jordan McRae	(United States) Cleveland Cavaliers	(Spain) Baskonia	1	
August 22	(Serbia) Vladimir Štimac	(Turkey) Beşiktaş	(Turkey) Anadolu Efes	1+1	
August 28	(Belarus) Artsiom Parakhouski	(Russia) UNICS	(Israel) Maccabi Tel Aviv	1+1	
September 1	(Argentina) Patricio Garino	(United States) Austin Spurs	(Spain) Baskonia	3	
September 7	(United States) Brad Wanamaker	(Turkey) Darüşşafaka	(Turkey) Fenerbahçe	1	
September 8	(Montenegro) Taylor Rochestie	(Russia) Lokomotiv Kuban	(Serbia) Crvena zvezda	1	
September 12	(Lithuania) Artūras Gudaitis	(Lithuania) Lietuvos rytas	(Italy) AX Olimpia Milan	1	
September 13	(Slovenia) Edo Murić	(Turkey) Banvit	(Turkey) Anadolu Efes	1+1	
September 15	(United States) Matt Janning	(Russia) Lokomotiv Kuban	(Spain) Baskonia	2 months	
September 18	(Latvia) Rolands Šmits	(Spain) Fuenlabrada	(Spain) Barcelona	5	
October 25	(United States) Dorell Wright	(Bosnia and Herzegovina) Igokea	(Germany) Brose Bamberg	1	
October 26	(Croatia) Damjan Rudež	(United States) Orlando Magic	(Spain) Valencia	3 months	
November 6	(United States) Curtis Jerrells	(Israel) Hapoel Jerusalem	(Italy) AX Olimpia Milan	2	
November 10	(Cape Verde) Edy Tavares	(Canada) Raptors 905	(Spain) Real Madrid	3	
December 9	(Spain) Sergi García	(Spain) Tecnyconta Zaragoza	(Spain) Valencia	4	
January 20	(Slovenia) Alen Omić	(Israel) Hapoel Jerusalem	(Serbia) Crvena zvezda	1	

=== Leaving a EuroLeague team ===
Date	Player	From	To	Ref.
June 2	(United States) Luke Sikma	(Spain) Valencia	(Germany) Alba Berlin	
June 9	(Serbia) Miroslav Raduljica	(Italy) AX Olimpia Milan	(China) Jiangsu Dragons	
July 1	(Germany) Daniel Theis	(Germany) Brose Bamberg	(United States) Boston Celtics	
July 3	(Israel) Guy Pnini	(Israel) Maccabi Tel Aviv	(Israel) Hapoel Holon	
July 4	(Serbia) Marko Simonović	(Serbia) Crvena zvezda	(Russia) Zenit	
July 4	(Turkey) Furkan Korkmaz	(Turkey) Anadolu Efes	(United States) Philadelphia 76ers	
July 11	(Serbia) Miloš Teodosić	(Russia) CSKA Moscow	(United States) Los Angeles Clippers	
July 13	(Serbia) Bogdan Bogdanović	(Turkey) Fenerbahçe	(United States) Sacramento Kings	
July 14	(Serbia) Stefan Jović	(Serbia) Crvena zvezda	(Germany) Bayern Munich	
July 14	(United States) Brandon Paul	(Turkey) Anadolu Efes	(United States) San Antonio Spurs	
July 14	(Israel) Gal Mekel	(Israel) Maccabi Tel Aviv	(Spain) Gran Canaria	
July 16	(Slovenia) Jaka Blažič	(Spain) Baskonia	(Spain) Andorra	
July 17	(Turkey) Cedi Osman	(Turkey) Anadolu Efes	(United States) Cleveland Cavaliers	
July 17	(United States) Jamar Smith	(Spain) Unicaja	(Russia) UNICS	
July 18	(Italy) Alessandro Gentile	(Italy) AX Olimpia Milan	(Italy) Virtus Bologna	
July 19	(Turkey) Oğulcan Baykan	(Turkey) Anadolu Efes	(Turkey) Demir IBB	
July 20	(Turkey) Can Maxim Mutaf	(Turkey) Anadolu Efes	(Turkey) Beşiktaş	
July 20	(Turkey) Samet Geyik	(Turkey) Anadolu Efes	(Turkey) Beşiktaş	
July 21	(Serbia) Milan Mačvan	(Italy) AX Olimpia Milan	(Germany) Bayern Munich	
July 24	(Bosnia and Herzegovina) Alex Renfroe	(Spain) Barcelona	(Turkey) Galatasaray	
July 26	(United States) Alex Kirk	(Turkey) Anadolu Efes	(Japan) Alvark Tokyo	
July 28	(Slovenia) Alen Omić	(Turkey) Anadolu Efes	(Israel) Hapoel Jerusalem	
July 31	(United States) Demetris Nichols	(Greece) Panathinaikos	(Croatia) Cedevita	
August 22	(Italy) Bruno Cerella	(Italy) AX Olimpia Milan	(Italy) Reyer Venezia	
