= EuroCup Basketball Coach of the Year =

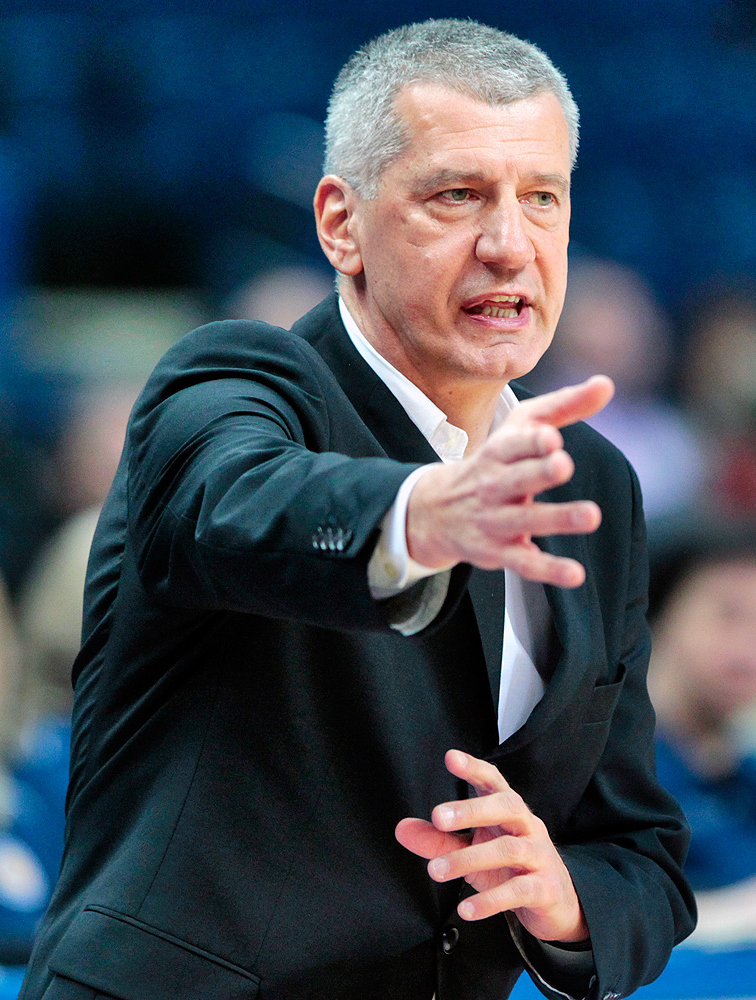
Aleksandar Petrović was the EuroCup Coach of the Year in 2011.

The EuroCup Basketball Coach of the Year is an annual award of EuroCup Basketball, which is the secondary level European-wide professional club basketball league, that is given to the player that EuroCup Basketball deems its "top rising star". The EuroCup Basketball League is the European-wide professional basketball league that is one tier level below the top-tier EuroLeague. The award began in the EuroCup Basketball 2008–09 season.

== EuroCup Basketball Coaches of the Year ==
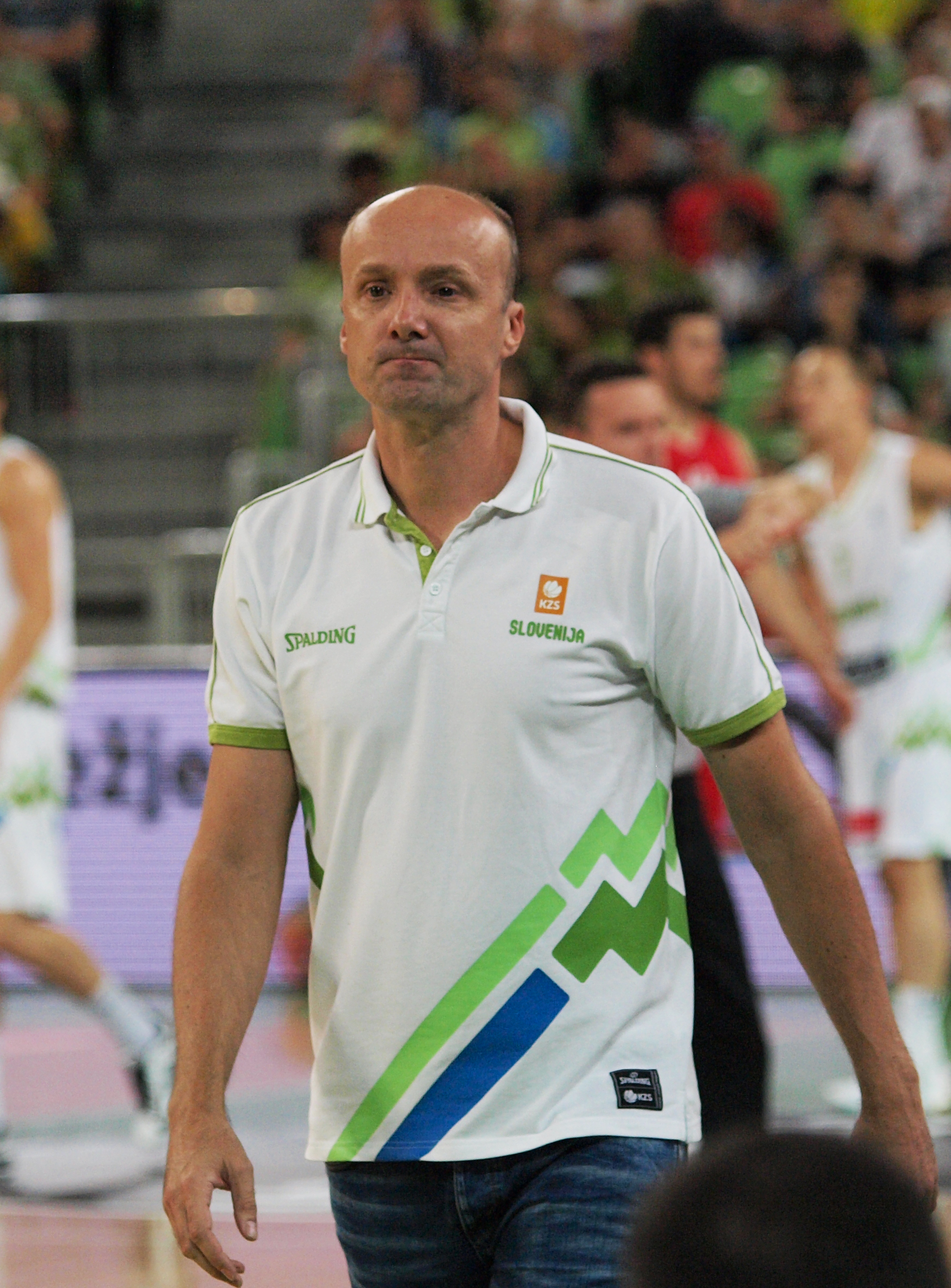
Jure Zdovc was the EuroCup Coach of the Year in 2012.

Player (X)	Denotes the number of times the coach was named Coach of the Year.

Season	Coach of the Year	Team	Ref.
2008–09	(Turkey) Oktay Mahmuti	(Italy) Treviso	
2009–10	(Greece) Ilias Zouros	(Greece) Panellinios	
2010–11	(Croatia) Aleksandar Petrović	(Croatia) Cedevita Zagreb	
2011–12	(Slovenia) Jure Zdovc	(Russia) Spartak St. Petersburg	
2012–13	(Greece) Fotios Katsikaris	(Spain) Bilbao	
2013–14	(Italy) Andrea Trinchieri	(Russia) UNICS Kazan	
2014–15	(Spain) Aíto García Reneses	(Spain) Gran Canaria	
2015–16	(Italy) Maurizio Buscaglia	(Italy) Aquila Trento	
2016–17	(Spain) Pedro Martínez	(Spain) Valencia	
2017–18	(Serbia) Saša Obradović	(Russia) Lokomotiv Kuban	
2018–19	(Spain) Aíto García Reneses (2)	(Germany) Alba Berlin	
2019–20	Not awarded ^{1}		
2020–21	(Montenegro) Zvezdan Mitrović	(France) Monaco	
2021–22	(Serbia) Dušan Alimpijević	(Turkey) Frutti Extra Bursaspor	
2022–23	(Turkey) Erdem Can	(Turkey) Türk Telekom	
2023–24	(Finland) Tuomas Iisalo	(France) Paris	
2024–25	(Spain) Pedro Martínez (2)	(Spain) Valencia	
2025–26	(Serbia) Dušan Alimpijević (2)	(Turkey) Beşiktaş Gain	

^1 There was no awarding in the 2019–20, because the season was cancelled due to the coronavirus pandemic in Europe.

== See also ==
- EuroLeague Coach of the Year
