= Eugene Lawrence =

American basketball player (born 1986)

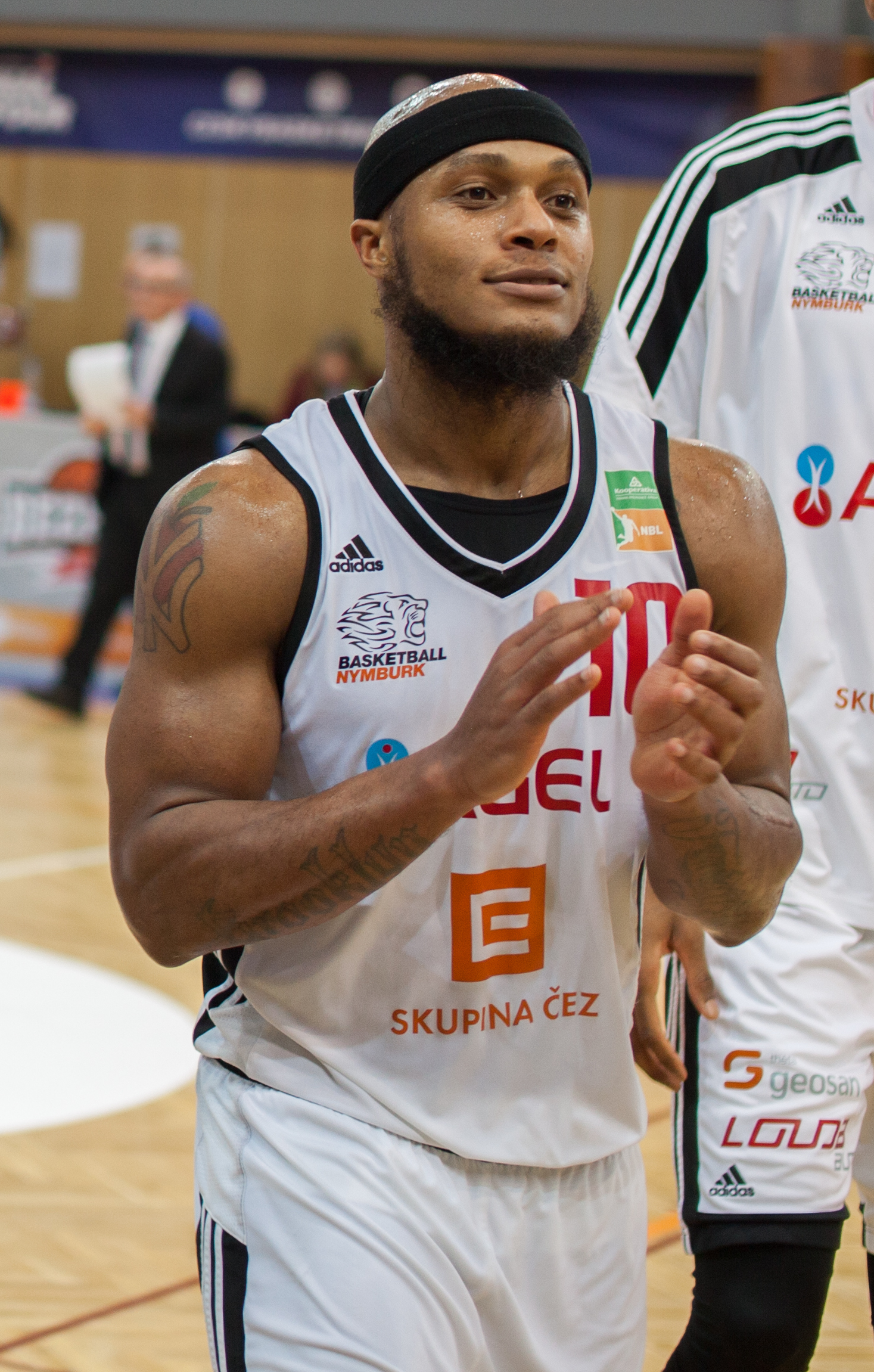
- Lawrence with ČEZ Nymburk in 2019

BC Novosibirsk
- Position: Point guard
- League: Russian Basketball Super League 1

Personal information
- Born: June 22, 1986 (age 40) Brooklyn, New York, U.S.
- Listed height: 6 ft 0 in (1.83 m)
- Listed weight: 217 lb (98 kg)

Career information
- High school: Abraham Lincoln (Brooklyn, New York)
- College: St. John's (2004–2008)
- NBA draft: 2008: undrafted
- Playing career: 2008–present

Career history
- 2008–2009: SPU Nitra
- 2009–2011: Prostějov
- 2011–2012: ČEZ Nymburk
- 2012–2014: Goverla
- 2014–2016: Telekom Bonn
- 2016–2019: ČEZ Nymburk
- 2019–2020: Ionikos Nikaias
- 2020: Telekom Bonn
- 2020–2021: Charilaos Trikoupis
- 2022–present: BC Novosibirsk

Career highlights
- 4x Czech League champion (2012, 2017–2019); 4x Czech Cup winner (2012, 2017–2019); Slovak League champion (2009)

Eugene Lawrence (born June 22, 1986) is an American professional basketball player for BC Novosibirsk of the Russian Basketball Super League 1.

== College career ==
After a successful high school career, Lawrence went on to play for St. John's University. Currently, Lawrence is ranked third in total assists among players in St. John's history.

== Professional career ==
Eugene played in Slovakia for SPU Nitra from 2008 to 2009, where he was named Player of the Year and won the Finals with his team. He then moved to the Czech Republic for three seasons. While playing for BK Prostejov from 2009 to 2011, Lawrence was runner-up in the Czech League for two seasons. During his second season there, he was named MVP of the All-Star Game. His team made it to the EuroChallenge last 16 in the 2010–11 season. In the 2011–12 season, he then moved to ČEZ Nymburk, where he won the Czech championship. He was named to the All-Star team starting five for the second season in a row.

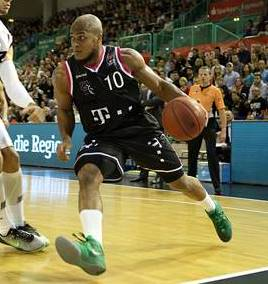
Lawrence playing with Telekom Baskets Bonn.

From 2012 to 2014, Lawrence played in Ukraine for BC Goverla. During his second season he left the team due to political hardships and civil war within the country. He then moved to Germany to play for Telekom Baskets Bonn.

In September 2016, Lawrence returned to ČEZ Nymburk. With Nymburk, Lawrence won three National Basketball League (NBL) titles and three Czech Cup titles in three years.

For the 2019–20 season, Lawrence signed with Ionikos Nikaias of the Greek Basket League.

On January 8, 2020, he signed back with Telekom Bonn of the Basketball Bundesliga.

On December 15, 2020, Lawrence returned to Greece for Charilaos Trikoupis. He averaged 5.1 points, 5.5 assists, 2.5 rebounds, and 1.2 steals per game. On February 8, 2022, Lawrence signed with BC Novosibirsk of the Russian Basketball Super League 1. Eugene Lawrence now resides at Eagle Academy for Young Men, where he is a junior varsity basketball coach who took the team on a 3x championship run.
