= Ian Vougioukas =

Greek basketball player

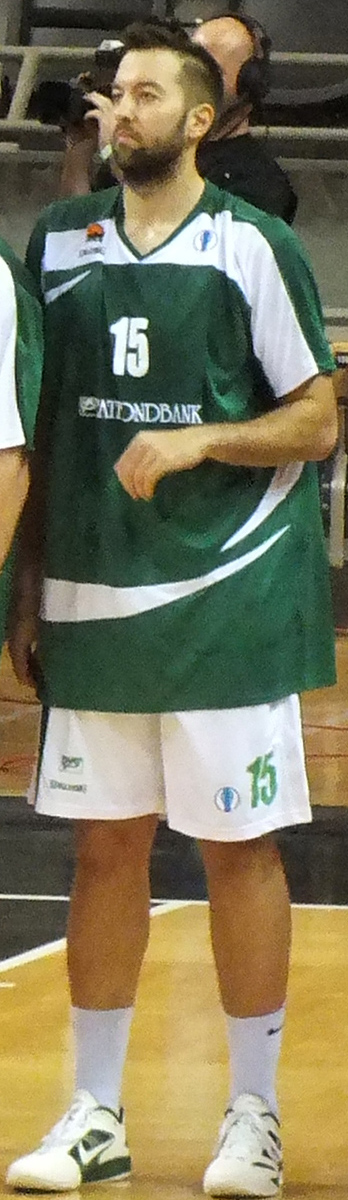
- Ian Vougioukas with Unics Kazan

Personal information
- Born: May 31, 1985 (age 41) London, United Kingdom
- Listed height: 6 ft 11 in (2.11 m)
- Listed weight: 280 lb (127 kg)

Career information
- College: Saint Louis (2003–2007)
- NBA draft: 2007: undrafted
- Playing career: 2007–2024
- Position: Center

Career history
- 2007–2010: Olympiacos
- 2007–2008: → Rethymno
- 2009–2010: → Panellinios
- 2010–2012: Panathinaikos
- 2012–2014: UNICS
- 2014–2015: Galatasaray
- 2015: ratiopharm Ulm
- 2015–2016: Žalgiris Kaunas
- 2016–2017: Lokomotiv Kuban
- 2017–2021: Panathinaikos
- 2023–2024: Panionios

Career highlights
- EuroLeague champion 2011; 5× Greek League champion (2011, 2018–2021); 3× Greek Cup winner (2012, 2019, 2021); Greek League Best Young Player (2008); 3× Greek All-Star (2010, 2011, 2018); Russian Cup winner (2014); LKL champion (2016); First-team All-Atlantic 10 (2006)
Medals
Men's basketball
Representing Greece
FIBA U-19 World Cup
Bronze medal – third place	2003 Thessaloniki	Under-19
FIBA U-21 World Cup
Silver medal – second place	2005 Mar del Plata	Under-21
Mediterranean Games
Silver medal – second place	2009 Pescara	Under-26

Ian Vougioukas (alternate spelling: Ian Vouyoukas) (Greek: Ίαν Βουγιούκας; born May 31, 1985) is a Greek former professional basketball player. Standing at 2.11 m (6 ft 11 in), he plays at the center position. He played college basketball in the United States, for Saint Louis University.

== Early life and career ==
Vougioukas, who was born in London, England, started playing basketball in his native country of Greece, with the youth clubs of Aris Glyfadas, Kronos, and Ilysiakos. He then moved to the United States, to play college basketball. He stayed in the U.S. until the end of the 2006–07 season.

== College career ==
While playing NCAA Division I college basketball with the Saint Louis Billikens, Vougioukas was named First-Team All-Atlantic 10 Conference and was ranked 14th in the A-10 in scoring, at 13.9 points per game, and sixth in rebounding, at 7.4 rebounds per game. One of his college highlights was a game-high 28 point performance, in a 65–64 double-overtime loss to Dayton, on March 3, 2007. In the same game, he also grabbed 11 rebounds.

== Professional career ==
After college, Vougioukas signed a three-year contract with the Greek EuroLeague club Olympiacos Piraeus. He was loaned to Rethymno, and he played with the squad during the 2007–08 season. In 2008, he returned to Olympiacos.

Vougioukas was loaned again, this time to Greek club Panellinios, for the 2009–10 season. In 2010, he signed with Greek club Panathinaikos, to a 2-year €1,620,000 gross income (€900,000 net income) contract. With Panathinaikos, Vougioukas won the EuroLeague and Greek League championships in 2011. He also won the Greek Cup title with Panathinaikos, in 2012.

In July 2012, Vougioukas signed two-year deal with the Russian club UNICS Kazan, of the VTB United League. He signed a 2-year €2 million net income contract.

In September 2014, Vougioukas signed a one-year deal with the Turkish club Galatasaray, of the Turkish Super League. In December 2014, he left Galatasaray. On February 26, 2015, he signed with ratiopharm Ulm of the German Bundesliga, for the rest of the season.

On 8 September 2015, Vougioukas signed a one-year deal with the Lithuanian League club Žalgiris Kaunas. On 17 August 2016, Vougioukas signed a 1+1 deal with the Russian club Lokomotiv Kuban. On July 1, 2017, Lokomotiv officially opted out of their deal with Vougioukas.

On July 4, 2017, Vougioukas returned to his former team, Panathinaikos, signing a 1+1 deal with them. He was later named the team's captain for a brief stint, due to a suspension of Nick Calathes. On August 1, 2019, Vougioukas renewed his contract with Panathinaikos, once again signing a 1+1 deal. On July 16, 2020, Vougioukas and the Greens officially parted ways. However, he was reinstated to the team on September 19 of the same year.

== National team career ==
=== Greek junior national team ===
Vougioukas was a member of the junior Greek national basketball teams. With Greece's junior national teams, he played at the 2001 FIBA Europe Under-16 Championship, the 2004 FIBA Europe Under-20 Championship, and the 2005 FIBA Europe Under-20 Championship. He also won the bronze medal at the 2003 FIBA Under-19 World Cup, and the silver medal at the 2005 FIBA Under-21 World Cup. He also won the silver medal at the 2009 Mediterranean Games, with Greece's under-26 national team.

=== Greek senior national team ===
As a member of the senior Greek national basketball team, Vougioukas played at the 2010 FIBA World Cup, and at the 2014 World Cup.

== Personal life ==
Vougioukas' younger brother Alex, is also a professional basketball player. His cousin Vaso Vougiouka, is an Olympics fencer.

== Career statistics ==
Legend
GP	Games played	GS	Games started	MPG	Minutes per game
FG%	Field-goal percentage	3P%	3-point field-goal percentage	FT%	Free-throw percentage
RPG	Rebounds per game	APG	Assists per game	SPG	Steals per game
BPG	Blocks per game	PPG	Points per game	PIR	Performance index rating
**Bold**	Career high

=== EuroLeague ===
†	Denotes season in which Vougioukas won the EuroLeague
*	Led the league

Year	Team	GP	GS	MPG	FG%	3P%	FT%	RPG	APG	SPG	BPG	PPG	PIR
2008–09	Olympiacos	7	0	2.3	.333	—	**1.000**	.3	—	.1	—	0.6	-0.1
2010–11†	Panathinaikos	22	7	8.1	.550	—	.649	1.1	.2	.2	.4	4.1	3.9
2011–12	Panathinaikos	23*	1	12.0	.549	—	.671	2.2	.5	.3	**.7**	7.2	8.1
2014–15	Galatasaray	9	2	9.4	.348	—	.667	1.9	1.0	.1	.2	2.4	3.1
2015–16	Žalgiris	24	**16**	**20.4**	.542	—	.857	**4.7**	**1.3**	**.5**	.6	**11.1**	**13.2**
2017–18	Panathinaikos	**33**	3	8.2	**.631**	—	.784	1.6	.4	.2	.2	3.7	4.1
2018–19	Panathinaikos	21	2	10.1	.596	.000	.750	1.9	.8	.1	.3	4.1	5.2
2019–20	Panathinaikos	18	1	7.9	.576	.000	.786	1.4	.4	.2	.3	2.7	3.0
2020–21	Panathinaikos	3	0	4.3	.500	.000	.000	.3	.3	—	—	1.3	0.3
Career		160	32	10.5	.553	.000	.751	2.0	.6	.2	.4	5.1	5.7

== Awards and accomplishments ==
=== College ===
- All-Atlantic 10 Conference First Team: (2006)

=== Pro career ===
- Greek League Best Young Player: (2008)
- 3× Greek All Star Game: (2010, 2011, 2018)
- EuroLeague Champion: (2011)
- 4× Greek League Champion: (2011, 2018, 2019, 2020)
- 3x Greek Cup Winner: (2012, 2019, 2021)
- Russian Cup Winner: (2014)
- Lithuanian League Champion: (2016)

=== Greek junior national team ===
- 2003 FIBA Under-19 World Cup: Bronze
- 2005 FIBA Under-21 World Cup: Silver
- 2009 Mediterranean Games: Silver
