= Andrea Trinchieri =

Italian professional basketball coach

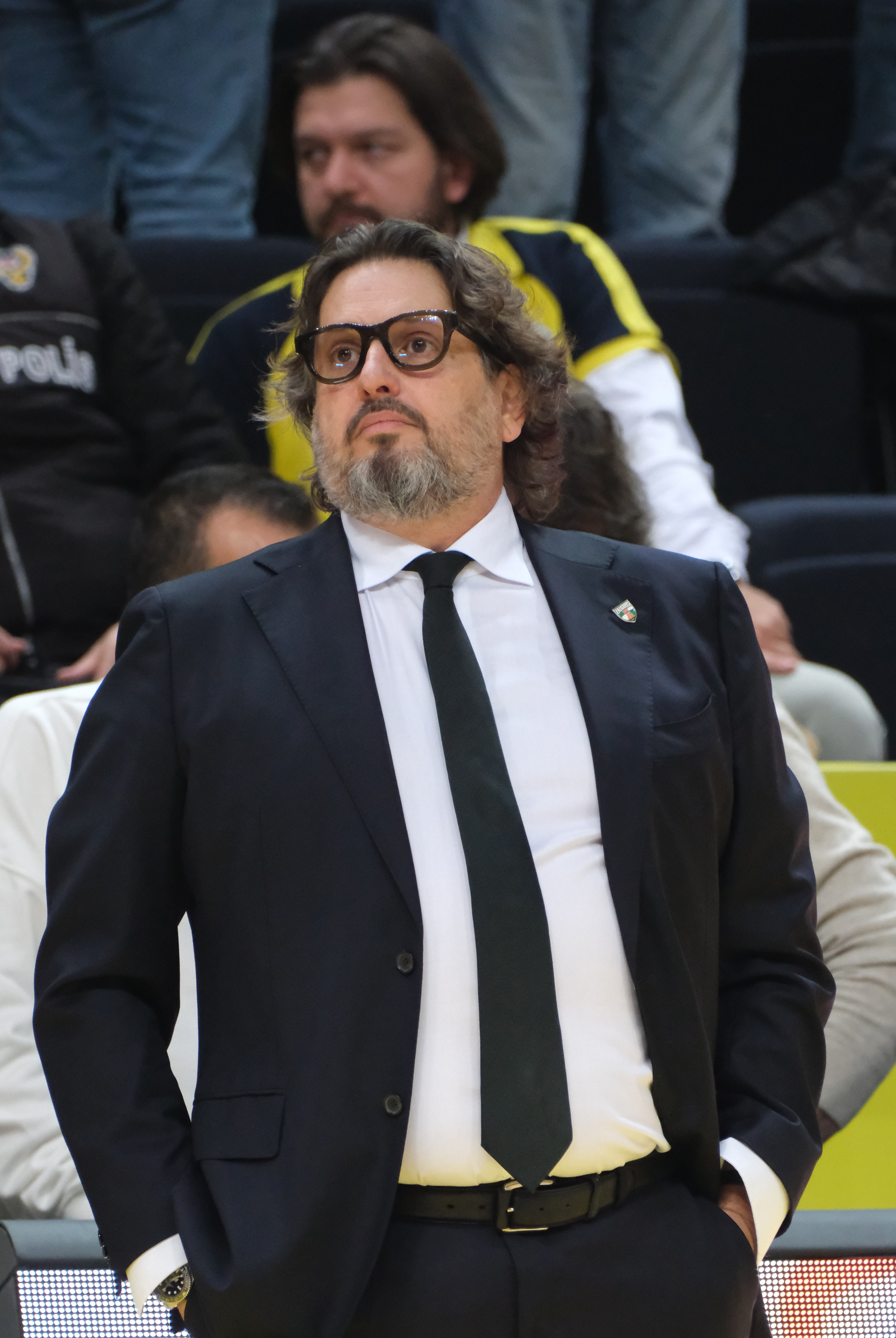
- Trinchieri with Žalgiris in 2025

PAOK Thessaloniki
- Position: Head coach
- League: Greek Basketball League; EuroCup

Personal information
- Born: August 6, 1968 (age 58) Milan, Italy

Career information
- Coaching career: 1998–present

Career history

Coaching
- 1998–2004: Olimpia Milano (assistant)
- 2004–2007: Triboldi
- 2007: Juvecaserta
- 2008–2009: Veroli
- 2009–2013: Cantù
- 2013–2014: UNICS
- 2013–2014: Greece
- 2014–2018: Brose Bamberg
- 2018–2020: Partizan
- 2020–2023: Bayern Munich
- 2023–2025: Žalgiris Kaunas
- 2026–present: PAOK Thessaloniki

Career highlights
- EuroCup Coach of the Year (2014); 3× German Bundesliga champion (2015–2017); LKL champion (2025); 3× German Cup winner (2017, 2021, 2023); 2× Serbian Cup winner (2019, 2020); 2× Lithuanian Cup winner (2024, 2025); Russian Cup winner (2014); ABA League Supercup winner (2019); German Supercup winner (2015); Italian Supercup winner (2012); 2× Lega Serie A Coach of the Year (2010, 2011); Italian Second Division Cup winner (2009); Italian Second Division Coach of the Year (2009)

Andrea Trinchieri (born 6 August 1968) is an Italian professional basketball coach who is the head coach for PAOK Thessaloniki of the Greek Basketball League (GBL) and the EuroCup.

== Coaching career ==
=== Clubs ===
Trinchieri was the assistant head coach with the Italian League club Olimpia Milano from 1998 to 2004. He then became the head coach of the Italian club Vanoli Basket from 2004 to 2007, and helped Vanoli get promoted from the Italian Third Division to the Italian Second Division. After that, he was the head coach of the Italian club Juvecaserta Basket, which was also in the Italian Second Division at that time.

His next head coaching job was also in the Italian Second Division, with Veroli Basket, during the 2008–09 season. With Veroli Basket, he won the Italian Second Division Cup title, and he was named the Italian Second Division's Coach of the Year in 2009.

After that, he became the head coach of the Italian team Cantù. As the head coach of Cantù, he was named the Italian League Coach of the Year in both 2010 and 2011. He also won the Italian Supercup with Cantù, in the 2012–13 season. In 2013, he became the head coach of the Russian VTB United League club UNICS Kazan. With UNICS, he was the EuroCup's Coach of the Year in the 2013–14 season.

In July 2014, it was announced that Trinchieri would be the new head coach of the German club Brose Bamberg. On 4 October 2015, he extended his contract with the club, until the end of the 2016–17 season. With Brose, he won the German national league championship, the Basketball Bundesliga, in the 2014–15, 2015–16, and 2016–17 seasons. On 19 February 19 2018, Trinchieri was released from his head coaching position with Brose, after the team lost 12 of their last 15 games.

On 1 November 2018, Trinchieri was named head coach of the Serbian club Partizan, signing a three-year deal. On 2 July 2020, Trinchieri parted ways with Partizan, with whom he won the 2018–19 and 2019–20 Radivoj Korać Cups, and 2019 ABA League Supercup.

On 15 July 2020, Trinchieri was appointed as the head coach of the German EuroLeague club Bayern Munich. On 22 June 2021, he extended his contract until 2023. The club parted ways with Trinchieri after his contract had ended.

On 30 December 2023, the Italian coach was named head coach of the Lithuanian club Žalgiris Kaunas, signing until 2025. He replaced Kazys Maksvytis, who left the club after an unsuccessful first half of the season.

On 23 June 2025, Trinchieri and Žalgiris parted ways.

On March 2, 2026, the Trinchieri was appointed as the head coach of PAOK Thessaloniki of the Greek Basketball League (GBL) and the EuroCup.

=== Greece national team ===
It was announced on January 2, 2013, by the Hellenic Basketball Federation, that Trinchieri would coach the Greece men's national basketball team for the next two years. In June 2014, he was replaced as Greece's head coach by Fotis Katsikaris, even though Trinchieri still had a valid contract as national team's head coach.

== Coaching record ==
Legend
G	Games coached	W	Games won	L	Games lost	W–L %	Win-loss %

Note: The EuroLeague is not the only competition in which the team played during the season. He also coached in domestic competition, and regional competition if applicable.

=== EuroLeague ===
Team	Year	G	W	L	W–L%	Result
Cantù	2011–12	16	8	8	.500	Eliminated in Top 16 stage
Cantù	2012–13	10	3	7	.300	Eliminated in group stage
Bamberg	2015–16	24	13	11	.542	Eliminated in Top 16 stage
Bamberg	2016–17	30	10	20	.333	Eliminated in regular season
Bamberg	2017–18	22	8	14	.364	Sacked
Bayern	2020–21	39	23	16	.590	Eliminated in quarterfinals
Bayern	2021–22	36	16	20	.444	Eliminated in quarterfinals
Bayern	2022–23	34	11	23	.324	Eliminated in regular season
Žalgiris	2023–24	17	9	8	.529	Eliminated in regular season
Žalgiris	2024–25	34	15	19	.441	Eliminated in regular season
Career		262	116	146	.443	

== Personal life ==
Trinchieri's family is international. His mother is from Croatia and his grandmother is from Montenegro. His father, Paolo Trinchieri, is from the United States and Panama, and his grandfather, Alfredo Trinchieri, was a diplomat from Italy.

== Awards and accomplishments ==
- Italian Second Division Cup Winner: (2009)
- Italian Second Division Coach of the Year: (2009)
- 2× Italian League Coach of the Year: (2010, 2011)
- Italian Supercup Winner: (2012)
- Russian Cup Winner: (2014)
- EuroCup Coach of the Year: (2014)
- 3× German League Champion: (2015, 2016, 2017)
- German Supercup Winner: (2015)
- 3x German Cup Winner: (2017, 2021, 2023)
- 2× Serbian Cup Winner: (2019, 2020)
- ABA League Supercup Winner: (2019)
- Lithuanian League Champion: (2025)
- 2× Lithuanian Cup Winner: (2024, 2025)

== See also ==
- List of Radivoj Korać Cup-winning head coaches
