= 2013–14 Eurocup Basketball =

European basketball competition

- Season: 2013–14
- Duration: October 15, 2013 – May 7, 2014
- Teams: 48 + 8

Regular season
- Season MVP: (United States) Andrew Goudelock

Finals
- Champions: (Spain) Valencia (3rd title)
- Runners-up: (Russia) UNICS
- Finals MVP: (Kosovo) Justin Doellman

Awards
- Rising Star: (Montenegro) Bojan Dubljević
- Coach of the Year: (Italy) Andrea Trinchieri

Statistical leaders
Points	(United States) Errick McCollum	20.2
Rebounds	(Montenegro) Vladimir Golubović	10.1
Assists	(Serbia) Marko Marinović	8.6
Index Rating	(Montenegro) Vladimir Golubović	26.7

The 2013–14 Eurocup Basketball season was the 12th edition of Europe's second-tier level transnational competition for men's professional basketball clubs, the EuroCup. The EuroCup is the European-wide league level that is one level below the EuroLeague. Valencia, the winner of this competition, earned a place at the group stage of the next season's EuroLeague. Valencia beat UNICS in two legs. It was the first time since the 2002–03 season, that the Finals were played over two games.

== Competition format changes ==
The competition increases from 32 to 48 teams in the Regular Season phase. The size of the groups will grow to six teams, where the first three qualified teams will join the Last 32 stage. Another innovation this season will see clubs divided into two regional conferences for the Regular Season phase.

Euroleague clubs that do not qualify for the Euroleague Top 16 will join the remaining 24 Eurocup teams for the Last 32 phase.

== Teams ==
48 teams will participate in Eurocup Regular Season. 41 of them will qualify directly to this stage with the seven losers of the Euroleague Qualifying Rounds. For the Last 32, eight teams who didn't make the Top 16 in the 2013–14 Euroleague would enter.

Key to colors
Champion	Runner-up	Semifinalist	Quarterfinalist	Eightfinalist	Last 32	Regular season

Country (League)	Teams	Teams (rankings in 2012–13 national championships)				
Regular season
France (LNB)	5	ASVEL (3)	Élan Chalon (4)	BCM Gravelines (5)	Le Mans (7)	Paris-Levallois (12)
Germany (BBL)	5	Oldenburg (2)	ratiopharm Ulm (3)	Alba Berlin (5)	Artland Dragons^{WC} (6)	Telekom Baskets Bonn^{WC} (7)
Italy (Lega A)	4	Acea Roma (2)	Cimberio Varèse (3)	FoxTown Cantù (4)	Banco di Sardegna Sassari^{WC} (5)	
Russia (PBL + VTB)	4	Khimki (3)	Spartak Saint Petersburg (4)	UNICS (5)	Nizhny Novgorod (8)	
Turkey (TBL)	4	Banvit (2)	Pınar Karşıyaka (4)	Beşiktaş Integral Forex (6)	Aykon TED Ankara (7)	
Belgium (BLB)	3	Telenet Oostende (1)	Belfius Mons-Hainaut (2)	Spirou Charleroi (3)		
Spain (ACB)	3	CAI Zaragoza (3)	Valencia (6)	Bilbao^{WC} (7)		
Croatia (ABA)	2	KK Cedevita (6)	KK Cibona^{WC} (11)			
Greece (GBL)	2	Panionios (3)	PAOK (5)			
Israel (BSL)	2	Maccabi Haifa (1)	Hapoel Jerusalem (4)			
Bosnia and Herzegovina (ABA)	1	KK Igokea (3)				
Bulgaria (NBL)	1	Lukoil Academic (1)				
Czech Republic (NBL)	1	ČEZ Nymburk (1)				
Estonia (KML + VTB)	1	BC Kalev/Cramo^{WC} (1)				
Finland (Korisliiga)	1	Bisons Loimaa^{WC} (1)				
Hungary (NBI/A)	1	Bericap Alba Fehérvár (1)				
Latvia (LBL)	1	VEF Rīga (1)				
Lithuania (LKL)	1	Neptūnas (3)				
Macedonia (ABA)	1	KK MZT Aerodrom^{WC} (7)				
Montenegro (ABA)	1	KK Budućnost (5)				
Romania (RBD)	1	CSU Asesoft (1)				
Serbia (ABA)	1	KK Radnički (4)				
Slovenia (ABA)	1	Union Olimpija^{WC} (8)				
Ukraine (UBL)	1	Khimik Yuzhny^{WC} (5)				
Last 32
France (LNB)	2	JSF Nanterre (1)	Strasbourg IG (2)			
Germany (BBL)	1	Brose Baskets (1)				
Italy (Lega A)	1	Montepaschi Siena (1)				
Lithuania (LKL)	1	Lietuvos Rytas (2)				
Serbia (ABA)	1	Crvena zvezda (2)				
Poland (PLK)	1	Stelmet Zielona Góra (1)				
Ukraine (UBL)	1	Budivelnyk (1)				

== Draw ==
The draws for the 2013–14 Eurocup were held on Saturday, 5 October, after the Euroleague Qualifying Rounds were played.

Teams were divided into two geographical conferences with 24 teams and 4 groups each. For the each conference teams were seeded into six pots of four teams in accordance with the Club Ranking, based on their performance in European competitions during a three-year period.

Two teams from the same country could not be drawn together in the same Regular Season group if possible. Liga ABA teams (Serbia, Croatia, Slovenia, Montenegro, Macedonia and Bosnia and Herzegovina) are considered as same country teams.

=== Western Conference ===
Pot 1	Pot 2	Pot 3	Pot 4	Pot 5	Pot 6
(Spain) Valencia BC (Germany) Alba Berlin (Spain) Bilbao Basket (Czech Republic) ČEZ Nymburk	(Croatia) KK Cedevita (Slovenia) Union Olimpija (Spain) CAI Zaragoza (Italy) FoxTown Cantù	(Italy) Acea Roma (Italy) Banco di Sardegna Sassari (Italy) Cimberio Varèse (France) Le Mans	(Belgium) Spirou Charleroi (France) ASVEL (Belgium) Telenet Oostende (Belgium) Belfius Mons-Hainaut	(Germany) ratiopharm Ulm (Croatia) KK Cibona (France) BCM Gravelines (France) Élan Chalon	(France) Paris-Levallois (Germany) Artland Dragons (Germany) EWE Baskets Oldenburg (Germany) Telekom Baskets Bonn

=== Eastern Conference ===
Pot 1	Pot 2	Pot 3	Pot 4	Pot 5	Pot 6
(Russia) UNICS (Russia) Khimki (Russia) Spartak Saint Petersburg (Montenegro) KK Budućnost	(Russia) Nizhny Novgorod (Turkey) Banvit (Turkey) Beşiktaş Integral Forex (Turkey) Pınar Karşıyaka	(Turkey) Aykon TED Ankara (Latvia) VEF Rīga (Israel) Hapoel Jerusalem (Greece) Panionios	(Greece) PAOK (Israel) Maccabi Haifa (Lithuania) Neptūnas (Bosnia and Herzegovina) KK Igokea	(Serbia) Radnički Kragujevac (North Macedonia) KK MZT Aerodrom (Ukraine) Khimik Yuzhny (Bulgaria) Lukoil Academic	(Estonia) BC Kalev/Cramo (Finland) Bisons Loimaa (Hungary) Bericap Alba Fehérvár (Romania) CSU Asesoft

== Regular season ==
Location of teams of the 2013–14 Eurocup.
Western Conference: Red: Group A; Green: Group B; Blue: Group C; Yellow: Group D; Eastern Conference: Purple: Group E; Orange: Group F; Pink: Group G; Brown: Group H.

The Regular Season began on Tuesday, October 15.

If teams were level on record at the end of the Regular Season, tiebreakers were applied in the following order:

1. Head-to-head record.
2. Head-to-head point differential.
3. Point differential during the Regular Season.
4. Points scored during the regular season.
5. Sum of quotients of points scored and points allowed in each Regular Season match.

Key to colors
Top three teams in each group advance to Last 32.

=== Western Conference ===
==== Group A ====
	Team	Pld	W	L	PF	PA	Diff	Tie-break
1.	(Italy) FoxTown Cantù	10	8	2	832	746	+86	1–1 (+23)
2.	(Belgium) Telenet Oostende	10	8	2	768	752	+16	1–1 (–23)
3.	(Czech Republic) ČEZ Nymburk	10	6	4	789	736	+53	
4.	(France) Le Mans Sarthe	10	5	5	719	718	+1	
5.	(Germany) Artland Dragons	10	2	8	721	820	–99	
6.	(Croatia) Cibona Zagreb	10	1	9	770	827	–57	

==== Group B ====
	Team	Pld	W	L	PF	PA	Diff	Tie-break
1.	(Italy) Banco di Sardegna Sassari	10	7	3	866	817	+49	
2.	(Croatia) Cedevita Zagreb	10	6	4	797	760	+37	
3.	(Spain) Bilbao Basket	10	5	5	855	826	+29	1–1 (+1)
4.	(Germany) EWE Baskets Oldenburg	10	5	5	789	797	–8	1–1 (–1)
5.	(France) Élan Chalon	10	4	6	779	786	–7	
6.	(Belgium) Spirou Charleroi	10	3	7	706	806	–100	

Source: Euroleague Basketball

==== Group C ====
	Team	Pld	W	L	PF	PA	Diff	Tie-break
1.	(Slovenia) Union Olimpija	10	7	3	743	698	+45	1–1 (+10)
2.	(Germany) Ratiopharm Ulm	10	7	3	761	745	+16	1–1 (–10)
3.	(Spain) Valencia BC	10	6	4	875	721	+154	
4.	(France) Paris-Levallois Basket	10	4	6	687	733	–46	2–0
5.	(France) ASVEL	10	4	6	706	794	–88	0–2
6.	(Italy) Cimberio Varese	10	2	8	730	811	–81	

Source: Euroleague Basketball

==== Group D ====
	Team	Pld	W	L	PF	PA	Diff	Tie-break
1.	(Germany) Alba Berlin	10	8	2	749	669	+80	
2.	(France) BCM Gravelines	10	6	4	749	690	+59	1–1 (+5)
3.	(Spain) CAI Zaragoza	10	6	4	803	719	+84	1–1 (–5)
4.	(Germany) Telekom Baskets Bonn	10	5	5	785	805	–20	
5.	(Italy) Acea Roma	10	3	7	761	777	–16	
6.	(Belgium) Belfius Mons-Hainaut	10	2	8	620	807	–187	

Source: Euroleague Basketball

=== Eastern Conference ===
==== Group E ====
	Team	Pld	W	L	PF	PA	Diff	Tie-break
1.	(Russia) Khimki	10	9	1	870	751	+119	
2.	(Israel) Hapoel Jerusalem	10	6	4	777	767	+10	
3.	(Turkey) Pınar Karşıyaka	10	5	5	805	806	–1	
4.	(Bulgaria) Lukoil Academic	10	4	6	728	756	–28	
5.	(Romania) CSU Asesoft	10	3	7	794	832	–38	2–0
6.	(Bosnia and Herzegovina) Igokea	10	3	7	746	808	–62	0–2

Source: Euroleague Basketball

==== Group F ====
	Team	Pld	W	L	PF	PA	Diff	Tie-break
1.	(Russia) BC Nizhny Novgorod	10	8	2	809	705	+104	
2.	(Ukraine) BC Khimik	10	6	4	786	732	+54	1–1 (+22)
3.	(Turkey) Aykon TED Ankara	10	6	4	788	774	+14	1–1 (–22)
4.	(Greece) PAOK	10	5	5	697	752	–55	
5.	(Montenegro) Budućnost VOLI Podgorica	10	3	7	772	802	–30	
6.	(Hungary) Bericap Alba Fehérvár	10	2	8	720	807	–87	

Source: Euroleague Basketball

==== Group G ====
	Team	Pld	W	L	PF	PA	Diff	Tie-break
1.	(Russia) Unics Kazan	10	10	0	837	625	+212	
2.	(Israel) Maccabi Haifa	10	6	4	744	745	–1	
3.	(Turkey) Banvit	10	5	5	795	718	+77	1–1 (+5)
4.	(Latvia) VEF Rīga	10	5	5	721	782	–61	1–1 (–5)
5.	(Estonia) BC Kalev/Cramo	10	3	7	673	764	–91	
6.	(North Macedonia) MZT Aerodrom	10	1	9	684	820	–136	

Source: Euroleague Basketball

==== Group H ====
	Team	Pld	W	L	PF	PA	Diff	Tie-break
1.	(Turkey) Beşiktaş Integral Forex	10	7	3	717	690	+27	
2.	(Greece) Panionios	10	6	4	768	755	+13	
3.	(Serbia) Radnički Kragujevac	10	5	5	824	824	0	1–1 (+1)
4.	(Finland) Bisons Loimaa	10	5	5	750	769	–19	1–1 (–1)
5.	(Lithuania) Neptūnas Klaipėda	10	4	6	814	807	+7	
6.	(Russia) BC Spartak Saint Petersburg	10	3	7	733	761	–28	

Source: Euroleague Basketball

== Last 32 phase ==
The Last 32 runs from January 7 to February 19, 2014

If teams were level on record at the end of the Last 32 phase, tiebreakers were applied in the following order:

1. Head-to-head record.
2. Head-to-head point differential.
3. Point differential during the Last 32 phase.
4. Points scored during the Last 32 phase.
5. Sum of quotients of points scored and points allowed in each Last 32 phase match.
Location of teams of the 2013–14 Eurocup Last 32 phase.
Blue: Group I; Red: Group J; Green: Group K; Yellow: Group L; Purple: Group M; Orange: Group N; Pink: Group O; Brown: Group P.

After Euroleague Regular Season
Country (League)	Teams	Teams (rankings in 2012–13 national championships)	
France (LNB)	2	JSF Nanterre (1)	Strasbourg IG (2)
Germany (BBL)	1	Brose Baskets (1)	
Italy (Lega A)	1	Montepaschi Siena (1)	
Lithuania (LKL)	1	Lietuvos Rytas (2)	
Serbia (ABA)	1	Crvena zvezda (2)	
Poland (PLK)	1	Stelmet Zielona Góra (1)	
Ukraine (UBL)	1	Budivelnyk (1)	

Key to colors
Top two teams in each group advance to eight-finals.

=== Group I ===
	Team	Pld	W	L	PF	PA	Diff	Tie-break
1.	(France) JSF Nanterre	6	4	2	489	472	+17	
2.	(Germany) Ratiopharm Ulm	6	3	3	507	503	+4	1–1 (+1)
3.	(Italy) FoxTown Cantù	6	3	3	519	493	+26	1–1 (–1)
4.	(Turkey) Pınar Karşıyaka	6	2	4	438	485	–47	

=== Group J ===
	Team	Pld	W	L	PF	PA	Diff	Tie-break
1.	(Turkey) Aykon TED Ankara	6	4	2	489	484	+5	
2.	(Italy) Banco di Sardegna Sassari	6	3	3	526	517	+9	1–1 (+7)
3.	(Germany) Brose Baskets	6	3	3	475	475	0	1–1 (–7)
4.	(France) BCM Gravelines	6	2	4	459	473	–14	

=== Group K ===
	Team	Pld	W	L	PF	PA	Diff	Tie-break
1.	(Russia) Khimki	6	6	0	525	421	+104	
2.	(Czech Republic) ČEZ Nymburk	6	2	4	470	486	–16	2–2 (+11)
3.	(Italy) Montepaschi Siena	6	2	4	461	481	–20	2–2 (–2)
4.	(Israel) Maccabi Haifa	6	2	4	406	474	–68	2–2 (–9)

=== Group L ===
	Team	Pld	W	L	PF	PA	Diff	Tie-break
1.	(Russia) Nizhny Novgorod	6	5	1	468	436	+32	
2.	(Serbia) Crvena zvezda	6	4	2	501	462	+39	
3.	(Spain) Bilbao Basket	6	3	3	494	471	+23	
4.	(Greece) Panionios	6	0	6	418	512	–94	

=== Group M ===
	Team	Pld	W	L	PF	PA	Diff	Tie-break
1.	(Israel) Hapoel Jerusalem	6	4	2	507	489	+18	1–1 (+1)
2.	(Ukraine) Budivelnyk Kyiv	6	4	2	500	491	+9	1–1 (–1)
3.	(Turkey) Banvit	6	3	3	478	465	+13	
4.	(Slovenia) Union Olimpija	6	1	5	451	491	–40	

=== Group N ===
	Team	Pld	W	L	PF	PA	Diff	Tie-break
1.	(Germany) Alba Berlin	6	5	1	479	442	+37	
2.	(Ukraine) Khimik Yuzhny	6	3	3	429	444	–15	
3.	(Serbia) Radnički Kragujevac	6	2	4	480	480	0	1–1 (+6)
4.	(France) Strasbourg IG	6	2	4	445	467	–22	1–1 (–6)

=== Group O ===
	Team	Pld	W	L	PF	PA	Diff	Tie-break
1.	(Russia) Unics Kazan	6	5	1	461	425	+36	
2.	(Spain) Valencia BC	6	3	3	500	431	+69	2–0
3.	(Belgium) Telenet Oostende	6	3	3	439	483	–44	0–2
4.	(Poland) Stelmet Zielona Góra	6	1	5	425	486	–61	

=== Group P ===
	Team	Pld	W	L	PF	PA	Diff	Tie-break
1.	(Lithuania) Lietuvos Rytas	6	4	2	491	492	–1	1–1 (+19)
2.	(Turkey) Beşiktaş Integral Forex	6	4	2	441	452	–11	1–1 (-19)
3.	(Croatia) Cedevita Zagreb	6	2	4	433	429	+4	1–1 (+5)
4.	(Spain) CAI Zaragoza	6	2	4	453	445	+8	1–1 (–5)

== Knockout phase ==
In the knockout phase rounds will be played in a home-and-away format, with the overall cumulative score determining the winner of a round. Thus, the score of one single game can be tied.

- The team that finished in the higher Last 32 place will play the second game of the series at home.
- If both teams placed the same in the Last 32, the team with more Last 32 victories will play the second game at home.
- In case of a tie in both place and victories, the team with the higher cumulative Last 32 point difference will play the second game at home.

=== Bracket ===
Round of 16
(France) Nanterre	82	71	153
(Ukraine) Budivelnyk	86	76	162
(Lithuania) Lietuvos rytas	82	82	164
(Serbia) Crvena zvezda	88	80	168
(Turkey) Aykon TED Ankara	71	72	143
(Ukraine) Khimik	75	60	135
(Russia) UNICS	91	76	167
(Czech Republic) ČEZ Nymburk	58	59	117
(Russia) Khimki	59	97	156
(Spain) Valencia	75	82	157
(Germany) Alba Berlin	91	96	187
(Italy) Dinamo Sassari	83	93	176
(Russia) Nizhny Novgorod	71	95	166
(Turkey) Beşiktaş İntegral Forex	88	71	159
(Israel) Hapoel Jerusalem	87	81	168
(Germany) ratiopharm Ulm	89	65	154

Quarter-finals
(Ukraine) Budivelnyk	82	70	152
(Serbia) Crvena zvezda	79	79	158
(Turkey) Aykon TED Ankara	68	52	120
(Russia) UNICS	81	88	169
(Spain) Valencia	86	73	159
(Germany) Alba Berlin	54	78	132
(Russia) Nizhny Novgorod	78	88	166
(Israel) Hapoel Jerusalem	81	72	153

Semi-finals
(Serbia) Crvena zvezda	63	67	130
(Russia) UNICS	52	84	136
(Spain) Valencia	84	79	163
(Russia) Nizhny Novgorod	75	53	128

Final
(Russia) UNICS	67	73	140
(Spain) Valencia	80	85	165

== Finals ==
=== Game 1 ===
1 May 2014
18:30

Boxscore

Valencia BC (Spain)	80–67	(Russia) UNICS
Scoring by quarter: 27–12, 22–15, 25–17, 6–23
Pts: Doellman 28; Rebs: Doellman 6 Asts: Lafayette 7		Pts: Veremeenko 19; Rebs: Eidson 11; Asts: Eidson, Zisis 4

Pabellón Fuente San Luis, Valencia
Attendance: 8,500
Referees: Sreten Radovic (CRO), Tolga Sahin (ITA), Olegs Latisevs (LVA)

=== Game 2 ===
7 May 2014
17:00

Boxscore

UNICS (Russia)	73–85	(Spain) Valencia BC
Scoring by quarter: 4–16, 21–23, 32–32, 16–14
Pts: Goudelock 22; Rebs: Eidson, Kurbanov 8 Asts: Eidson 4		Pts: Doellman 26; Rebs: Sato 7 Asts: Lafayette 6

Basket Hall Arena, Kazan
Attendance: 7,000
Referees: Luigi Lamonica (ITA), Recep Ankarali (TUR), Elias Koromilas (GRE)

Eurocup 2014 Champions

Valencia BC
Third title

== Individual statistics ==
=== Rating ===
Rank	Name	Team	Games	Rating	PIR
1.	(Montenegro) Vladimir Golubović	(Turkey) Aykon TED Ankara	20	533	26.65
2.	(Uruguay) Esteban Batista	(Turkey) Pınar Karşıyaka	16	368	23.00
3.	(Venezuela) Donta Smith	(Israel) Maccabi Haifa	16	343	21.44
4.	(United States) Errick McCollum	(Greece) Panionios	16	339	21.19
5.	(United States) Caleb Green	(Italy) Dinamo Basket Sassari	18	374	20.78

=== Points ===
Rank	Name	Team	Games	Points	PPG
1.	(United States) Errick McCollum	(Greece) Panionios	16	323	20.19
2.	(Montenegro) Vladimir Golubović	(Turkey) Aykon TED Ankara	20	386	19.30
3.	(United States) Caleb Green	(Italy) Dinamo Basket Sassari	18	347	19.28
4.	(United States) Andrew Goudelock	(Russia) UNICS	24	451	18.79
5.	(Turkey) Bobby Dixon	(Turkey) Pınar Karşıyaka	16	291	18.19

=== Rebounds ===
Rank	Name	Team	Games	Rebounds	RPG
1.	(Montenegro) Vladimir Golubović	(Turkey) Aykon TED Ankara	20	202	10.10
2.	(United States) Dijon Thompson	(Russia) Nizhny Novgorod	15	123	8.20
3.	(Uruguay) Esteban Batista	(Turkey) Pınar Karşıyaka	16	130	8.13
4.	(United States) Trent Plaisted	(Germany) Ratiopharm Ulm	17	118	6.94
5.	(United States) Marcus Lewis	(France) BCM Gravelines	15	103	6.87

=== Assists ===
Rank	Name	Team	Games	Assists	APG
1.	(Serbia) Marko Marinović	(Serbia) Radnički Kragujevac	16	137	8.56
2.	(United States) Mike Green	(Russia) BC Khimki	17	109	6.41
3.	(Italy) Travis Diener	(Italy) Dinamo Basket Sassari	14	83	5.93
4.	(North Macedonia) Marques Green	(Italy) Dinamo Basket Sassari	18	100	5.56
5.	(Latvia) Kristaps Valters	(Turkey) Aykon TED Ankara	19	105	5.53

== Awards ==
=== MVP Weekly ===
==== Regular season ====
Week	Player	Team	PIR
1	(Italy) Pietro Aradori	(Italy) FoxTown Cantu	36
2	(Benin) Mouphtaou Yarou	(Serbia) Radnički Kragujevac	41
3	(Venezuela) Donta Smith	(Israel) Maccabi Haifa	41
4	(Liberia) Joe Ragland	(Italy) FoxTown Cantu	36
5	(United States) Mike Green	(Russia) Khimki Moscow	34
6	(Montenegro) Vladimir Golubović	(Turkey) Aykon TED Ankara	36
7	(Finland) Sasu Salin	(Slovenia) Union Olimpija	32
8	(United States) T. J. Carter	(Greece) Panionios	34
9	(United States) Jason Love	(Belgium) Belfius Mons-Hainaut	34
10	(United States) Alando Tucker	(Bulgaria) Lukoil Academic	43

==== Last 32 ====
Week	Player	Team	PIR
1	(United States) Omar Thomas	(Italy) Dinamo Basket Sassari	30
2	(United States) Trenton Meacham	(France) JSF Nanterre	33
3	(Venezuela) Donta Smith (2)	(Israel) Maccabi Haifa	40
4	(Uruguay) Esteban Batista	(Turkey) Pınar Karşıyaka	46
5	(Montenegro) Vladimir Golubović (2)	(Turkey) Aykon TED Ankara	51
6	(United States) Caleb Green	(Italy) Dinamo Basket Sassari	34

==== Eighthfinals ====
Week	Player	Team	PIR
1	(Lithuania) Darjuš Lavrinovič	(Ukraine) Budivelnyk Kyiv	38
2	(Montenegro) Vladimir Golubović (3)	(Turkey) Aykon TED Ankara	38

==== Quarterfinals ====
Game	Player	Team	PIR
1	(Kosovo) Justin Doellman	(Spain) Valencia BC	34
2	(United States) Reggie Redding	(Germany) Alba Berlin	40

==== Semifinals ====
Game	Player	Team	PIR
1	(Montenegro) Bojan Dubljević	(Spain) Valencia BC	31
2	(Greece) Nikos Zisis	(Russia) UNICS	31

==== Finals ====
Game	Player	Team	PIR
1	(Kosovo) Justin Doellman (2)	(Spain) Valencia BC	35
2	(Kosovo) Justin Doellman (3)	(Spain) Valencia BC	34

=== Eurocup MVP ===
- (United States) Andrew Goudelock (UNICS)

=== Eurocup Finals MVP ===
- (Kosovo) Justin Doellman (Valencia BC)

=== All-Eurocup Teams ===
Position	All-Eurocup First Team	Club team	All-Eurocup Second Team	Club	Ref
PG	(Serbia) DeMarcus Nelson	(Serbia) Crvena Zvezda	(Israel) Yotam Halperin	(Israel) Hapoel Jerusalem	
SG/SF	(United States) Andrew Goudelock	(Russia) UNICS	(United States) Reggie Redding	(Germany) Alba Berlin	
SG/SF	(United States) Dijon Thompson	(Russia) Nizhny Novgorod	(United States) Caleb Green	(Italy) Dinamo Sassari	
PF/C	(Kosovo) Justin Doellman	(Spain) Valencia BC	(Montenegro) Bojan Dubljević	(Spain) Valencia BC	
PF/C	(Montenegro) Vladimir Golubović	(Turkey) Aykon TED Ankara	(Lithuania) Darjuš Lavrinovič	(Ukraine) Budivelnyk Kyiv	

=== Coach of the Year ===
- (Italy) Andrea Trinchieri (UNICS)

=== Rising Star ===
- (Montenegro) Bojan Dubljević (Valencia Basket)

== See also ==
- 2013–14 Euroleague
- 2013–14 EuroChallenge
