= Volgograd Sports Palace of Trade Unions =

Russian Indoor Sporting Arena

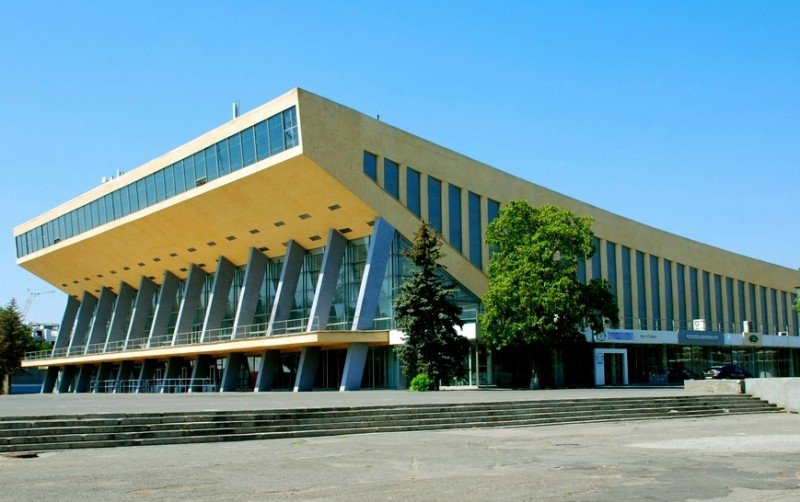
- Interactive map of Volgograd Sports Palace of Trade Unions
- Location: Volgograd, Russia
- Coordinates: 48.7463°N 44.5473°E
- Capacity: Basketball: 3,700

Construction
- Groundbreaking: 1969
- Built: 1974
- Opened: April 1975
- Renovated: 2011

Tenant
- Krasny Oktyabr (former)

Volgograd Sports Palace of Trade Unions is an indoor sporting arena that is located in Volgograd, Russia. The arena can be used to host basketball, handball, futsal, ice hockey, martial arts, concerts and shows, and dancing.

The seating capacity of the arena is 3,700 for basketball games. It was the home arena of the Russian basketball team Krasny Oktyabr of the VTB United League.
