= Vladimir Veremeenko =

Belarusian basketball player (born 1984)

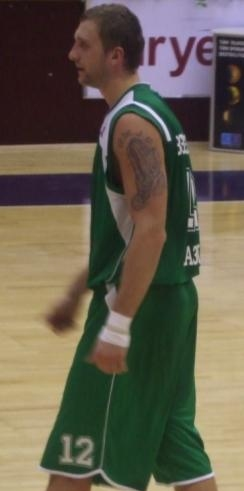
- Veremeenko with UNICS Kazan

Personal information
- Born: July 21, 1984 (age 42) Gomel, Byelorussian SSR, Soviet Union
- Listed height: 2.08 m (6 ft 10 in)
- Listed weight: 107 kg (236 lb)

Career information
- NBA draft: 2006: 2nd round, 48th overall pick
- Drafted by: Washington Wizards
- Playing career: 1999–2021
- Position: Power forward

Career history
- 1999–2002: Gocor-Sozh Gomel
- 1999–2000: → RShVSM-BGPA Minsk
- 2002–2004: Avtodor Saratov
- 2004–2006: Dynamo Saint Petersburg
- 2006–2008: Khimki
- 2008–2014: UNICS Kazan
- 2014–2015: Banvit
- 2015–2016: Reggiana
- 2016–2017: Brose Bamberg
- 2017–2018: Nizhny Novgorod
- 2018–2019: AEK Larnaca
- 2019–2021: Tsmoki-Minsk

Career highlights
- EuroCup champion (2011); FIBA Europe League champion (2005); 3× Russian Cup winner (2008, 2009, 2014); Russian Cup All-Cup Team (2014); Russian League All-Symbolic Second Team (2012)
- Stats at Basketball Reference

Vladimir Veremeenko (born July 21, 1984) is a Belarusian former professional basketball player.

== Professional career ==
The son of professional basketball players, Veremeenko was an early bloomer as he started his career with local side Gomel aged 15, playing in the 1999–00 Korać Cup before making the Belarusian league All-Star Game the next season.

He moved to Russian club Avtodor Saratov in 2002, averaging 14.2 points and 7 rebounds per game during his second season in the Russian Super League. When club owner Vladimir Radionov moved the club to Saint Petersburg to form Dynamo, Veremeenko followed him. He would contribute 12.6 points and 5.5 rebounds per game to the club's 2005 FIBA Europe League title.

Veremeenko was drafted in the second round (48th pick) of the 2006 NBA draft by the Washington Wizards on 28 June 2006. He did not join the club, moving to another Super League side, BC Khimki, later that year following Dynamo Saint Petersburg's bankruptcy. Spending two seasons with the club, Veremeenko did not manage to crack the first team and found himself frustrated by his substitute status, even as the Russian team fought for titles (winning the 2008 Russian Cup). The Wizards invited him to play in the NBA Summer League in July 2008, his stats of 3.8 points and 3.6 rebounds in around 11 minutes per game proved to his only career contribution for the Wizards, with his rights used as a makeweight in a 2010 salary-cap motivated deal which brought Kirk Hinrich and Kevin Séraphin from the Chicago Bulls. On July 7, 2016, his rights were traded to the Cleveland Cavaliers alongside Mike Dunleavy Jr. for the draft rights of Albert Miralles, which was done in order for the Bulls to sign Dwyane Wade. On August 7, 2018, his rights were traded to the Los Angeles Clippers for Sam Dekker, rights to Renaldas Seibutis and cash, with Clippers aiming to free up a roster spot.

Signed by UNICS Kazan in August 2008, the big man quickly rediscovered his form. He would spend a total of six seasons as a vital part of Kazan's successes, two Russian Cups in 2009 and 2014 (with Veremeenko making the All-Cup team in 2014) and the 2011 EuroCup.

He moved to Spanish side CAI Zaragoza in August 2014, but bought out his contract a month later to accept a better paid offer from Turkish outfit Banvit, not even playing a friendly game with the Spaniards. His time with Banvit would see him break the all-time EuroCup record for total rebounds with a new mark of 476 over eight seasons, ending the season with 543; from averages of 9.1 points and 4.3 rebounds per game in the competition in addition to 10.4 points and 5.1 rebounds in the Turkish Super League. On 18 August 2015, Veremeenko signed with Italian Serie A outfit Grissin Bon Reggio Emilia for one year.

On 11 August 2016, Veremeenko signed with German club Brose Bamberg for the 2016–17 season.

On September 2, 2019, he has signed with Tsmoki-Minsk of the VTB United League.

== International career ==
Veremeenko played for the Belarus under-age teams, playing with the Under-18s until 2002, then with the Under-20s at the 2004 European Championship. He started playing for the senior national team from 2003, playing with the team in the Division B EuroBasket in 2005 and 2007.

== Honours ==
=== Individual ===
- VTB United League
  - Top Belarusian Player (x2): 2012–13, 2013–14.
- Russian Cup
  - All-Cup Team: 2013–14
- EuroCup
  - All-time total rebounds leader: 543 (2 September 2015)

=== Team ===
==== Club ====
- FIBA Europe League:
  - Champion: 2005
- Russian Cup
  - Winner (x3): 2008, 2009, 2014
- EuroCup
  - Champion: 2011
