= BC Krasny Oktyabr =

- Founded: 2012
- Dissolved: 2016
- Arena: Volgograd Sports Palace of Trade Unions
- Capacity: 3,700
- Location: Volgograd, Russia
- Team colors: Red, White, Black
- President: Dmitry Gerasimenko
- Website: bcredoctober.com
Home	Away

BC Krasny Oktyabr was a Russian professional basketball club that is based in Volgograd. In English, the club's name translates to "'BC Red October'". The club played in the VTB United League until 2016, when the team was forced to leave the league because its home arena did not meet requirements.

== History ==
The team was founded in 2012, and played its first season in the Russian Basketball Super League, the second division in Russia. In the 2013–14 season, the team played in the VTB United League, the highest stage for Russian clubs. In the first season of Krasny Oktyabr in the VTB United League, it qualified for the playoffs by finishing in the 6th place in Group B. Also, European powerhouse CSKA Moscow was defeated by Krasny Oktyabr in the quarterfinals of the 2013–14 Russian Cup tournament.

On August 30, 2016, the team was forced to leave the United League, because its home arena wasn't approved to host tournaments.

== Arenas ==
The club usually played its home games at the 3,700 seat Volgograd Sports Palace of Trade Unions, which is located in Volgograd. The club also played European-wide competition home games at the 5,000 seat Krylatskoye Sports Palace, which is located in Moscow.

== Season by season ==
Season	Tier	League	Pos.	Result	Russian Cup	European competitions	
2012–13	2	Super League	11	–	–	–	
2013–14	1	VTB United League	6	Round of 16	Semifinalist	–	
2014–15	1	VTB United League	12	–	Quarterfinalist	–	
2015–16	1	VTB United League	9	–	–	Eurocup	RS

== Notable players ==
- (United States) D. J. Cooper
