= 2014–15 Russian Basketball Cup =

Russian Basketball Cup
- Teams: 44

Finals
- Champions: Novosibirsk
- Runners-up: Dynamo Moscow
- Semifinalists: Krasnye Krylia; Spartak Primorye

The 2014–15 Russian Basketball Cup was the 14th season of the annual cup tournament in Russia.

The Final Four was played in Novosibirsk on 28–29 March 2015.

== Rules ==
Teams were only allowed to play with Russian players.

== Participants ==
Defending champions Unics Kazan did not participate, just like other Russian Euroleague teams CSKA Moscow, Nizhny Novgorod.

Of the VTB United League, only 3 teams (Khimki, Krasnye Krylia and Krasny Oktyabr) participated.

== Final four ==
Semifinals; 28 March 2015
Krasnye Krylia | 82
Dynamo Moscow | 86
Novosibirsk | 64
Spartak Primorye | 55

Finals; 29 March 2015
Dynamo Moscow | 78
Novosibirsk | 81
