= 2013–14 Russian Basketball Cup =

- League: Russian Basketball Cup
- Sport: Basketball
- Number of teams: 50
- Season MVP: (United States) Drew Goudelock (UNICS Kazan)

Final
- Champions: UNICS Kazan
- Runners-up: Lokomotiv Kuban

Russian Basketball Cup seasons
- ← 2012–13 2014–15 →

The 2013–14 Russian Basketball Cup was the 13th season of the Russian Basketball Cup. From the Eightfinals till the Final, all teams played two legs to decide which team advanced. UNICS Kazan and Lokomotiv Kuban qualified for the Final, Krasny Oktyabr and Khimki were semifinalists. Unics won the cup on May 14, 2014. Drew Goudelock exploded for 36 points in the final game.

== Bracket ==
All rounds were played over two legs.

Quarterfinals
Khimki	162
Avtodor Saratov	145
Spartak Saint Petersburg	116
UNICS Kazan	125
CSKA Moscow	154
Krasny Oktyabr	159
Lokomotiv Kuban	154
Triumph Lyubertsy	151

Semifinals
Khimki	138
UNICS Kazan	152
Krasny Oktyabr	141
Lokomotiv Kuban	152

Finals
UNICS Kazan	159
Lokomotiv Kuban	121

== Semifinals ==
=== Game 1 ===
April 18, 2014
18:30

Boxscore

UNICS Kazan	76–59	Khimki
Scoring by quarter: 16–10, 15–19, 21–12, 24–18
Pts: Kostas Kaimakoglou 19; Rebs: Chuck Eidson 12; Asts: Marko Popović 4		Pts: Lončar, Koponen 13; Rebs: Lončar, Augustine 6 Asts: Kalnietis, Williams 3

Basket-Hall Arena, Kazan
Attendance: 3,900

March 31, 2014
19:00

Boxscore

Krasny Oktyabr	72–81	Lokomotiv Kuban
Scoring by quarter: 17–13, 24–22, 17–29, 14–17
Pts: Cuthbert Victor 18; Rebs: Marcus Cousin 8 Asts: Bernard King 7		Pts: Derrick Brown 19; Rebs: Richard Hendrix 11; Asts: Kalnietis, Williams 3

Sports Palace Volgograd, Volgograd
Attendance: 2,500

=== Game 2 ===
April 23, 2014
19:00

Boxscore

Khimki	79–76	UNICS Kazan
Scoring by quarter: 19–22, 11–18, 22–18, 27–18
Pts: Petteri Koponen 18; Rebs: James Augustine 8 Asts: Petteri Koponen 8		Pts: Drew Goudelock 25; Rebs: Nikita Kurbanov 7 Asts: Nikos Zisis 4

Basketball Center, Khimki
Attendance: 1,500

April 7, 2014
20:00

Boxscore

Lokomotiv Kuban	71–69	Krasny Oktyabr
Scoring by quarter: 18–25, 22–18, 16–11, 15–15
Pts: Andrey Zubkov 18; Rebs: Krunoslav Simon 8 Asts: Williams, Simon 3		Pts: Willie Deane 17; Rebs: Cuthbert Victor 12; Asts: Cuthbert Victor 6

Basket-Hall, Krasnodar
Attendance: 1,500

== Finals ==
April 27, 2014
18:00

UNICS Kazan	66–45	Lokomotiv Kuban
Scoring by quarter: 16–14, 15–12, 15–11, 20–8
Pts: Drew Goudelock 21; Rebs: Chuck Eidson 10; Asts: Chuck Eidson 5		Pts: Derrick Brown 12; Rebs: Aleks Maric 8 Asts: Anton Ponkrashov 5

Basket-Hall Arena, Kazan
Attendance: 4,000
Referees: Sergey Mikhailov, Simon Owino, Alexander Romanov

May 14, 2014
20:00

Lokomotiv Kuban	76–93	UNICS Kazan
Scoring by quarter: 18–27, 17–12, 21–32, 20–22
Pts: Derrick Brown 25; Rebs: Mantas Kalnietis, Richard Hendrix 5 Asts: Marcus Williams 4		Pts: Drew Goudelock 36; Rebs: Chuck Eidson 9 Asts: Nikos Zisis 6

Basket-Hall, Krasnodar
Attendance: 3,467

== Awards ==
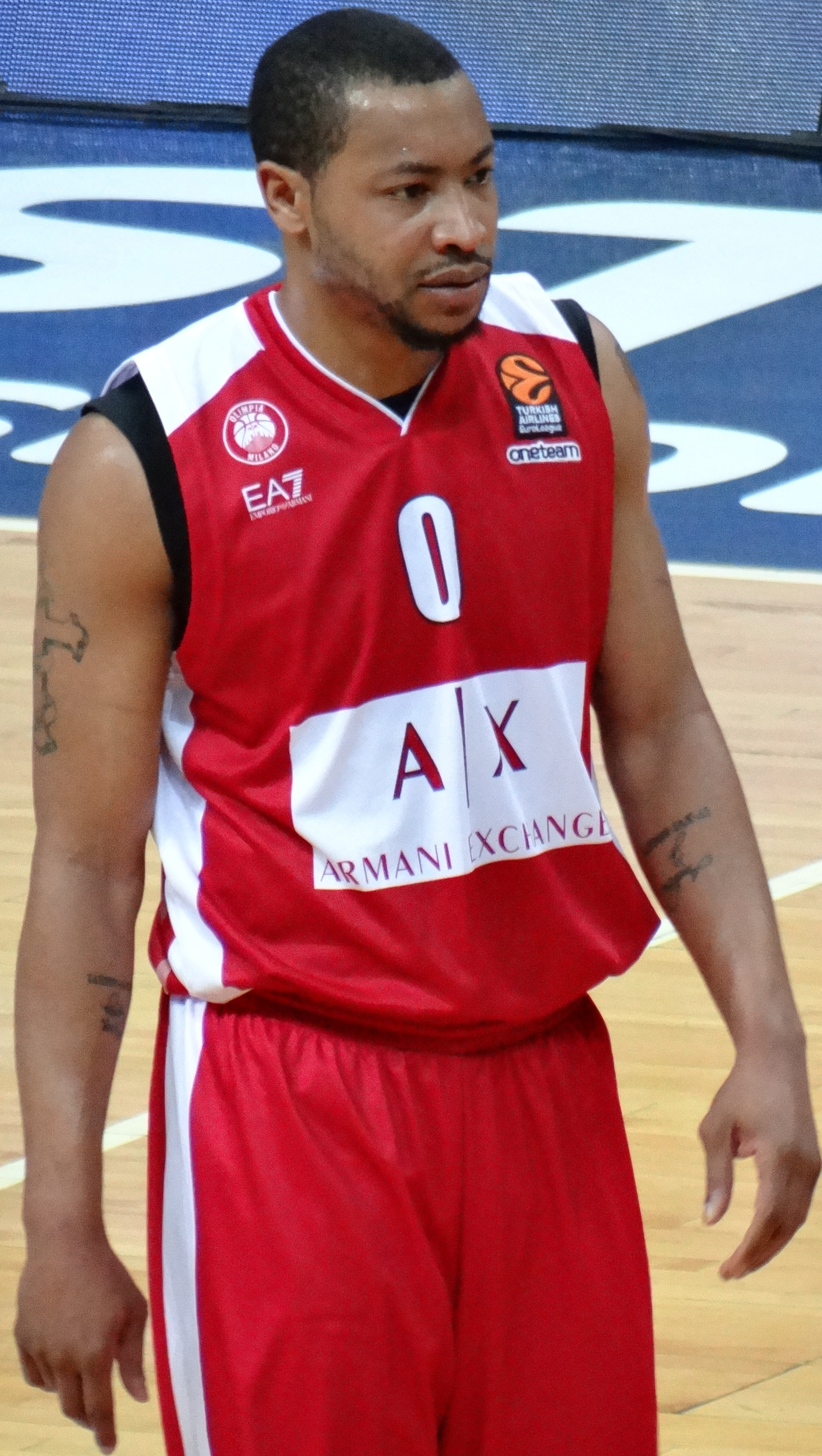
MVP Andrew Goudelock

Most Valuable Player

- (United States) Drew Goudelock (UNICS Kazan)

All-Season Team

- (United States) Marcus Williams (Lokomotiv Kuban)
- (Croatia) Krunoslav Simon (Lokomotiv Kuban)
- (United States) Von Wafer (Krasny Oktyabr)
- (Belarus) Vladimir Veremeenko (UNICS Kazan)
- (Croatia) Krešimir Lončar (Khimki)
