= BC Novosibirsk =

Russian basketball team

- Leagues: Russian Super League (II)
- Founded: 2011
- Arena: Sportkomplex SEVER
- Location: Novosibirsk, Russia
- Head coach: Vladimir Pevnev
- Website: https://bcnovosibirsk.ru/
Home	Away

BC Novosibirsk (Russian: БК «Новосибирск») is a professional basketball team based in Novosibirsk, Russia. It plays in the Russian Super League, the second highest level of basketball in Russia.

In 2015, they won the Russian Cup by beating Dynamo Moscow in the Final. Novosibirsk repeated its success in 2017, defeating PSK Sakhalin.

== Trophies ==
- Russian Basketball Super League 1 (1):

2014–15

- Russian Cup (2):

2014–15, 2016–17
