= Andrew Goudelock =

American basketball player (born 1988)

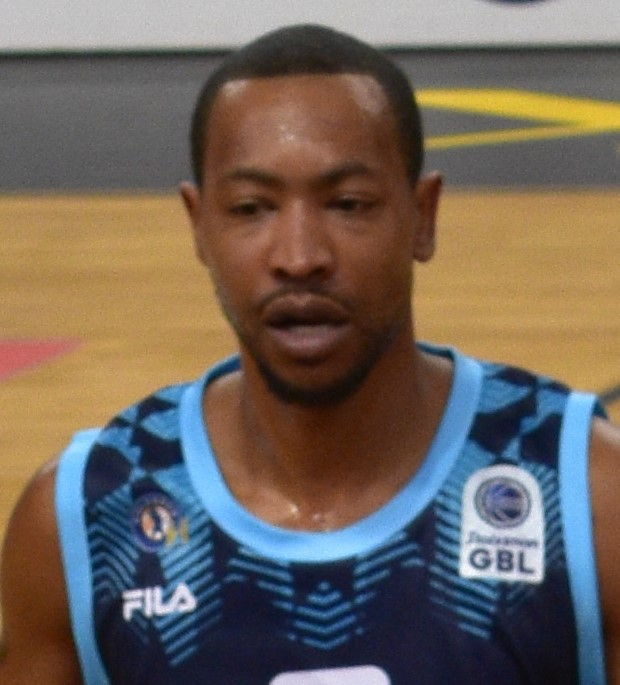
- Goudelock with Kolossos Rodou in 2024

APOEL
- Position: Shooting guard
- League: Cypriot Division A

Personal information
- Born: December 7, 1988 (age 37) Gainesville, Georgia, U.S.
- Listed height: 6 ft 3 in (1.91 m)
- Listed weight: 203 lb (92 kg)

Career information
- High school: Stone Mountain (Stone Mountain, Georgia)
- College: College of Charleston (2007–2011)
- NBA draft: 2011: 2nd round, 46th overall pick
- Drafted by: Los Angeles Lakers
- Playing career: 2011–present

Career history
- 2011–2012: Los Angeles Lakers
- 2011: →Los Angeles D-Fenders
- 2012–2013: Sioux Falls Skyforce
- 2013: Rio Grande Valley Vipers
- 2013: Los Angeles Lakers
- 2013–2014: UNICS Kazan
- 2014–2015: Fenerbahçe Ülker
- 2015–2016: Xinjiang Flying Tigers
- 2016: Houston Rockets
- 2016–2017: Maccabi Tel Aviv
- 2017–2018: Olimpia Milano
- 2018–2019: Shandong Golden Stars
- 2019–2020: Reyer Venezia
- 2020–2021: Rytas Vilnius
- 2021–2023: Bilbao
- 2023: Andorra
- 2023–2026: Kolossos Rodou
- 2026–present: APOEL

Career highlights
- All-EuroLeague Second Team (2015); EuroLeague 50–40–90 club (2017); EuroCup MVP (2014); All-EuroCup First Team (2014); VTB United League MVP (2014); All-VTB United League First Team (2014); Lega Serie A champion (2018); Lega Serie A Finals MVP (2018); Italian Supercup winner (2017); Russian Cup winner (2014); Russian Cup MVP (2014); Israeli Cup winner (2017); All-Israeli Premier League First Team (2017); Greek All-Star (2023); LKL Three-Point Contest winner (2021); NBA D-League MVP (2013); All-NBA D-League First Team (2013); SoCon Player of the Year (2011); 3× First-team All-SoCon (2009–2011); Second-team All-SoCon (2008)
- Stats at NBA.com
- Stats at Basketball Reference

Andrew Darius Goudelock (born December 7, 1988) is an American professional basketball player for APOEL of the Cypriot Division A. Standing at 6 ft 3 in (1.91 m), he plays at the shooting guard position. He played college basketball for the Charleston Cougars and was named the Southern Conference Player of the Year in 2011.

Goudelock was drafted by the Los Angeles Lakers in the second round of the 2011 NBA draft. Following a year with the Lakers, he spent a season with the Sioux Falls Skyforce and the Rio Grande Valley Vipers in the NBA Development League, winning the NBA Development League Most Valuable Player Award in 2013. He was re-signed by the Lakers towards the end of the 2012–13 season. Goudelock was an All-EuroLeague Second Team selection in 2015, as he reached the Euroleague Final Four with Fenerbahçe Ülker.

== High school career ==
Goudelock attended Stone Mountain High School under coach William Johnson, leading the Pirates to a 24–7 record as a senior while averaging 22.7 points per game and hitting 42.4 percent of his three-point attempts. He was named Georgia 4A Player of the Year.

== College career ==
Goudelock played college basketball for the College of Charleston, majoring in sociology. As a senior, he averaged 23.4 points and was the fourth-highest-scoring player in the nation. Goudelock's 40.7 percent three-point average was the nation's second highest; he scored 131 of his 322 three-point attempts. He was voted an All-America honorable mention by the Associated Press. On March 15, 2011, he scored 39 points, including shooting 8-of-15 on three-pointers, in front of a sellout crowd in the first round of the NIT Tournament. The Cougars were playing the Dayton Flyers in the first round of the 2011 NIT Tournament. The game, which the Cougars won 94–84, was Goudelock's last game at home in Carolina First Arena (now TD Arena).

Goudelock became known for his tremendous range and his ability to hit three-pointers well beyond the college (and NBA) three-point line. One of Goudelock's breakout games came on January 4, 2010, against the defending national champions UNC, in which he hit a game-tying three with less than 3 seconds left and led the Cougars to an eventual 72–69 win in overtime at Carolina First Arena.

Goudelock was the fifth-leading scorer in NCAA Division I for his senior year. During his four-year career, Goudelock appeared in 140 games, averaging 18.4 points, 3.3 rebounds and 3.0 assists per game.

== Professional career ==
=== Los Angeles Lakers (2011–2012) ===
Goudelock was selected by the Los Angeles Lakers in the second round as the 46th overall pick of the 2011 NBA Draft. Goudelock was also drafted by the Harlem Globetrotters. On December 17, he was assigned to the Los Angeles D-Fenders by the Lakers and was recalled the next day. While Steve Blake was injured he became the back up point guard, averaging 20 minutes a game. In his rookie season, Andrew Goudelock averaged 4.4 points in 10.5 minutes per game. Goudelock was waived by the Lakers on October 27, 2012.

=== NBA D-League / Los Angeles Lakers (2012–2013) ===
On November 2, 2012, he was drafted by the Sioux Falls Skyforce of the NBA Development League. On January 3, 2013, he was traded to the Rio Grande Valley Vipers in a three-way trade also involving Erie BayHawks. On February 4, Goudelock was named to the Prospects All-Star roster for the 2013 D-League All-Star Game. However, due to injury, he was replaced by Travis Leslie.

On April 14, 2013, Goudelock re-signed with the Los Angeles Lakers after Kobe Bryant suffered a season-ending Achilles tendon injury. He had just signed with Puerto Rico's Cangrejeros de Santurce, but turned around with the Lakers' offer. Goudelock afterwards played 6 minutes in the Lakers' final game of the season against the Houston Rockets, and another 6 in the second game of the playoffs against the San Antonio Spurs.

On April 25, Goudelock was named the 2012–13 NBA Development League Most Valuable Player Award for his earlier play with Rio Grande Valley and Sioux Falls. With Lakers guards Steve Nash, Steve Blake, and Jodie Meeks also out with injuries, Goudelock started with fellow second-year guard Darius Morris in game 3 of the first round of the 2013 playoffs against the San Antonio Spurs. In his first playoff start, Goudelock scored a career-high 20 points, but the Lakers lost 120–89 for their worst home playoff loss in franchise history. In game 4, Goudelock scored 14 points in an 82–103 defeat that eliminated the Lakers. The guard said, "We basically threw a team together", but considered his NBA call-up a learning experience.

=== UNICS Kazan (2013–2014) ===
On July 26, 2013, Goudelock signed a one-year deal with UNICS Kazan. On April 27, 2014, he was named the VTB United League MVP, after he averaged 20.1 points, 1.9 rebounds and 2.8 assists per game in the VTB United League regular season. For the entire VTB United League season, regular season and playoffs combined, he averaged 19.8 points, 2.0 rebounds, 2.8 assists, and 0.7 steals per game in 22 games played.

After having the best season in his career, he was named to the All-EuroCup First Team and selected the season MVP of Europe's 2nd-tier competition, the EuroCup. In the EuroCup, he averaged 18.8 points, 2.0 rebounds, 3.1 assists, and 0.8 steals per game in 24 games played.

=== Fenerbahçe Ülker (2014–2015) ===
On July 2, 2014, Goudelock signed a two-year deal with the Turkish Basketball Super League team Fenerbahçe Ülker. In a roster full of talent like Jan Veselý, Nemanja Bjelica, Bogdan Bogdanović, Ricky Hickman and others, Goudelock quickly emerged as a first scoring option for one of the most demanding and greatest European head coaches, Željko Obradović. He was named the EuroLeague MVP of the Week of the Round 2, after putting up 27 points, 3 rebounds, 2 assists, and 3 steals, for a total index rating of 30, in his second EuroLeague game against Turów Zgorzelec. On November 13, 2014, Goudelock set the EuroLeague record since the 2000–01 season in three-point field goals made, with 10, in a 93–86 victory over FC Bayern Munich. He finished the game with 34 points, 4 assists, and 3 rebounds, for a total index rating of 40. For such a performance, he was named the EuroLeague MVP of the Week of Round 5.

In May 2015, he was selected to the All-EuroLeague Second Team for the performances he put up over the season. Fenerbahçe also advanced to the EuroLeague Final Four for the first time in the team's history. On May 15, 2015, however, they lost in the 2015 Euroleague Final Four semifinal game to Real Madrid, by a score of 87–96. Goudelock led his team with 26 points, 6 rebounds, and 4 assists in the semifinal. Eventually, Fenerbahçe finished the Final Four in 4th place, after losing in the third-place game to CSKA Moscow, by a score of 80–86. In the third-place game, Goudelock once again led his team in scoring, with 24 points on 10 of 15 shooting from the field. Goudelock finished his first EuroLeague season with the averages of 17 points, 2.2 rebounds, and 2.1 assists per game, over 29 games played. Being the team's leader in scoring, he scored 20 or more points eleven times during the Euroleague 2014–15 season.

On June 17, 2015, Fenerbahçe's team manager, Ömer Onan, confirmed that Goudelock would not play for the Turkish team in the next season. Goudelock later stated to the media that he had personally wanted to stay with Fenerbahçe, and play with them in the next season, but that the team did not want him back, and declined to pick up the option for another year in his contract.

=== Xinjiang Flying Tigers (2015–2016) ===
On July 14, 2015, Goudelock signed with Xinjiang Flying Tigers of China for the 2015–16 CBA season. In 35 games, he averaged 22.1 points per game.

=== Houston Rockets (2016) ===
On March 9, 2016, Goudelock signed with the Houston Rockets. Three days later, he made his debut with the Rockets in a 125–109 loss to the Charlotte Hornets, recording two points and one steal in five minutes. On July 9, 2016, Goudelock was waived by the Rockets.

=== Maccabi Tel Aviv (2016–2017) ===
On August 2, 2016, Goudelock signed with Israeli club Maccabi Tel Aviv for the 2016–17 season. He helped Maccabi to win the 2017 Israeli State Cup.

=== Olimpia Milano (2017–2018) ===
On July 10, 2017, Goudelock signed with Italian club Olimpia Milano.

On June 15, 2018, Goudelock went to win his first Italian title ever with Milano by beating Dolomiti Energia Trento in game 6 of the 2018 LBA Finals. He was named MVP in the league's Finals series of the playoffs.

=== Shandong Golden Stars (2018–2019) ===
On July 23, 2018, Goudelock returned to China for a second stint, signing with the Shandong Golden Stars. In 19 games played for Shandong, he averaged 23.2 points and 3.3 assists per game, while shooting 44.3 percent from three-point range.

=== Umana Reyer Venezia (2019–2020) ===
On October 21, 2019, Goudelock returned to Italy for a second stint, signing with Umana Reyer Venezia for the 2019–20 season, even though he was officially registered to the league only three months later, on January 23, 2020. The team parted ways with him on June 16, 2020.

=== Rytas Vilnius (2020–2021) ===
On August 12, 2020, Goudelock signed with Rytas Vilnius for a one-year deal. On February 14, 2021, Goudelock won the 2021 Lithuanian League Three-Point Contest. He averaged 14.6 points, 2.4 assists and 1.8 rebounds per game.

=== Bilbao Basket (2021–2023) ===
On June 30, 2021, Goudelock signed with Bilbao Basket of the Liga ACB.

=== Kolossos Rodou (2023–2026) ===
On October 27, 2023, Goudelock signed with Kolossos Rodou of the Greek Basket League. On April 27, 2024, he renewed his contract for another season. On June 25, 2025, Goudelock re-signed with the team for another season, after finishing the 2024–25 season as the second-leading scorer in the Greek Basket League.

=== APOEL B.C. (2026–present) ===
On February 24, 2026, Goudelock signed with APOEL of the Cypriot Division A.

== Career statistics ==
Legend
GP	Games played	GS	Games started	MPG	Minutes per game
FG%	Field-goal percentage	3P%	3-point field-goal percentage	FT%	Free-throw percentage
RPG	Rebounds per game	APG	Assists per game	SPG	Steals per game
BPG	Blocks per game	PPG	Points per game	PIR	Performance index rating
**Bold**	Career high

=== NBA ===
==== Regular season ====
Year	Team	GP	GS	MPG	FG%	3P%	FT%	RPG	APG	SPG	BPG	PPG
2011–12	L.A. Lakers	**40**	0	**10.5**	.391	**.373**	**.917**	.8	**.5**	.1	.0	**4.4**
2012–13	L.A. Lakers	1	0	6.0	.000	.000	.000	**1.0**	.0	.0	.0	.0
2015–16	Houston	8	0	6.3	**.450**	.111	.750	.3	**.5**	**.8**	**.3**	2.8
Career		49	0	9.7	.393	.345	.875	.7	.5	.2	.0	4.0

==== Playoffs ====
Year	Team	GP	GS	MPG	FG%	3P%	FT%	RPG	APG	SPG	BPG	PPG
2012	L.A. Lakers	**4**	0	2.5	**.667**	**1.000**	.000	.3	.0	.0	.0	1.3
2013	L.A. Lakers	3	**2**	**26.7**	.444	.200	**1.000**	**1.7**	**1.0**	**1.7**	.0	**12.0**
2016	Houston	2	0	5.5	.500	.000	.000	1.0	.0	.0	.0	3.0
Career		9	2	11.2	.467	.250	1.000	.9	.3	.6	.0	5.2

=== EuroLeague ===
Year	Team	GP	GS	MPG	FG%	3P%	FT%	RPG	APG	SPG	BPG	PPG	PIR
2014–15	Fenerbahçe	**29**	19	**29.8**	**.511**	**.461**	.750	2.2	2.1	.7	.1	17.0	14.4
2016–17	Maccabi	20	16	28.7	.508	.458	.913	**2.6**	**2.9**	.3	.1	**17.3**	**16.1**
2017–18	Milano	25	**23**	26.3	.392	.313	**.926**	2.4	1.8	**.8**	**.2**	12.3	9.2
Career		74	58	28.4	.474	.411	.865	2.4	2.2	.6	.1	15.5	13.1

=== EuroCup ===
Year	Team	GP	GS	MPG	FG%	3P%	FT%	RPG	APG	SPG	BPG	PPG	PIR
2013–14	UNICS	**24**	**23**	**27.4**	**.453**	**.409**	**.944**	**2.0**	**3.1**	**.9**	**.1**	**18.8**	**15.2**
2019–20	Venezia	3	0	14.4	.412	.286	.750	.7	.7	.0	.0	6.3	4.7
Career		27	23	26.3	.451	.403	.867	1.9	2.8	.7	.1	17.4	14.0

=== Basketball Champions League ===
Year	Team	GP	GS	MPG	FG%	3P%	FT%	RPG	APG	SPG	BPG	PPG
2020–21	Rytas Vilnius	**4**	**4**	**25.1**	.460	.550	**.800**	**2.0**	**2.8**	.5	.0	**14.5**
2024–25	Kolossos Rodou	3	3	22.3	**.538**	**.571**	.556	1.0	1.0	**1.0**	.0	12.3
Career		7	7	23.9	.487	.522	.643	1.6	2.0	.7	.0	13.5

=== Domestic leagues ===
Year	Team	League	GP	MPG	FG%	3P%	FT%	RPG	APG	SPG	BPG	PPG
2011–12	(United States) L.A.D-Fenders	D League	1	47.1	.458	.200	.000	4.0	7.0	2.0	.0	24.0
2012–13	(United States) R.G. Valley Vipers	D League	37	36.7	.491	.404	.841	4.1	5.8	1.3	.1	21.3
2012–13	(United States) Sioux Falls Skyforce	D League	14	37.3	.438	.278	.821	3.4	3.4	.7	.1	20.2
2013–14	(Russia) UNICS	VTBUL	22	25.8	.509	.437	.909	2.0	2.8	.7	.0	19.8
2014–15	(Turkey) Fenerbahçe	TBSL	34	25.8	.433	.352	.872	2.0	2.1	.6	.0	11.0
2015–16	(China) Flying Tigers	CBA	35	35.1	.476	.416	.843	3.8	3.2	1.1	.2	22.1
2016–17	(Israel) Maccabi Tel Aviv	Ligat HaAl	22	25.0	.502	.517	.915	1.9	3.1	.6	.0	15.4
2017–18	(Italy) Olimpia Milano	LBA	37	26.9	.457	.382	.787	2.6	1.8	.5	.1	15.5
2018–19	(China) Shandong Golden Stars	CBA	19	35.1	.481	.443	.909	2.9	3.4	1.1	.2	23.3
2020–21	(Lithuania) Rytas Vilnius	LKL	35	22.7	.484	.481	.922	1.9	2.5	.7	.0	14.5
2021–22	(Spain) Bilbao	ACB	30	24.4	.442	.385	.887	1.5	1.3	.7	.0	14.3
2022–23	(Spain) Bilbao	ACB	6	22.5	.474	.458	1.000	.7	.8	.3	.2	11.8
2023–24	(Greece) Kolossos Rodou	GBL	33	26.4	.508	.398	.890	2.6	2.3	.5	.0	16.4
2024–25	(Greece) Kolossos Rodou	GBL	26	28.5	.492	.471	.909	2.1	2.2	.9	.0	17.7

=== College ===
Year	Team	GP	GS	MPG	FG%	3P%	FT%	RPG	APG	SPG	BPG	PPG
2007–08	Charleston	33	18	29.0	**.466**	.422	**.871**	2.5	2.1	1.0	.2	13.2
2008–09	Charleston	36	35	31.1	.459	**.440**	.867	2.5	1.9	.7	.3	16.7
2009–10	Charleston	34	34	**35.6**	.451	.393	.824	**4.4**	3.9	**1.1**	**.4**	19.4
2010–11	Charleston	**37**	**37**	35.2	.455	.407	.821	3.9	**4.2**	.9	.2	**23.7**
Career		140	124	32.8	.457	.413	.838	3.3	3.0	.9	.3	18.4

== Personal life ==
He is the son of Marvin and Angela Austin. He majored in sociology at the College of Charleston.
