= BC UNICS =

Professional basketball club in Kazan, Russia

UNICS Kazan
- Leagues: VTB United League
- Founded: 1991; 35 years ago
- History: BC UNICS (1991–present)
- Arena: Basket-Hall Kazan
- Capacity: 7,482
- Location: Kazan, Russia
- Team colors: Green, White
- President: Yevgeny Bogachev
- Team manager: Valery Kolesnikov
- Head coach: Milan Karakas
- Championships: 1 EuroCup; 1 Russian Championship; 3 Russian Cups; 1 North European League; 1 EuroChallenge
- Website: unics.ru
| Home | Away |

BC UNICS (Russian: БК УНИКС) is a professional basketball club in Kazan, Russia, that plays in the VTB United League, and formerly played in the EuroLeague. On February 28, 2022, EuroLeague Basketball suspended the team because of the 2022 Russian invasion of Ukraine.

Their home arena is Basket-Hall Kazan.

== History ==
=== 1991-1999 ===
UNICS was established in 1991. Though officially the club's men's professional club was founded in 1991 (when it first began to play in the lowest level of the national pro leagues), UNICS traces its origins back to KSU's college team Burevestnik, which participated in the USSR student championships from 1957. Because of this, the name 'UNICS' is an abbreviation – UNIversity, Culture, Sport.

Between 1994 and 1997, UNICS secured a berth in Russia's first division. In 1997, UNICS was promoted to the Russian Basketball Super League A, which was at the time the top-tier level Russian league. A year later, Yevgeny Bogachev, the chairman of the National Bank of the Tatarstan, became the president of the club.

=== 2000-2019 ===
The team placed second to CSKA in the Russian Basketball Super League in 2001 and 2002, a year in which it also reached the Saporta Cup semifinals, losing against the Greek club Maroussi in the semifinals. UNICS' first title was the Russian Cup in March 2003, with an 81–82 overtime victory over CSKA. Kazan hosted the FIBA Europe League final four, which was eventually named the FIBA EuroChallenge, in April 2004. UNICS won its regular season group, and advanced to the final four, where the club was crowned the FIBA Europe League champions. The MVP of the tournament's final four. By the 2005–06 season, UNICS went one level up, and made its ULEB Cup (later named EuroCup) debut. However, things turned south quickly, as UNICS lost at home against Roma in the tournament's eighth finals’ second leg, and crashed out. The team the next season made it to the ULEB Cup semifinals, before losing to the eventual league champs Real Madrid. It also returned to the Russian League finals, losing against CSKA.

In the 2007–08 season, UNICS made it to the ULEB Cup (now called EuroCup) Final Eight, but fell to Akasvayu Girona in the quarterfinals. UNICS finally broke through in the EuroCup in the 2010–11 season, by winning its regular season and Last 16 groups, before sweeping its quarterfinal series against Pepsi Caserta. UNICS beat KK Cedevita 87–66, in the semifinals, behind 27 points from Terrell Lyday, and registered a 92–77 win against Cajasol Sevilla, in the title game. Marko Popović had a EuroCup Finals record of 11 assists, to lead UNICS to the title. In the Russian League, UNICS had a 21–6 record, to finish the regular season atop the standings, but then went out in the playoff semifinals, after a five-game duel against BC Khimki. The club then competed in the Turkish Airlines EuroLeague in the following season. It made its EuroLeague debut in the 2011–12 season. In the Russian League it finished first at the end of the regular season, and reached the playoff semifinals.

=== 2020-present ===
Jarrell Brantley left the team in early 2022 due to the 2022 Russian invasion of Ukraine. The team is suing him for $250,000, and trying to prevent him from signing with a G League team. Similarly, Americans Isaiah Canaan, John Brown, and John Holland left the team after the invasion.

On February 28, 2022, EuroLeague Basketball suspended the team because of the 2022 Russian invasion of Ukraine.

== Honours ==
=== Domestic competitions ===
- VTB United League

Champions (1): 2023

- Russian Championship

Champions (1): 2023

- Russian Cups

Champions (3): 2003, 2009, 2014

=== European competitions ===
- EuroCup

Champions (1): 2011

- EuroChallenge

Champions (1): 2004

- North European League

Champions (1): 2003

== Season by season ==
| Season | Tier | Division | Pos. | Russian Cup | European competitions | | Other competitions | |
|---|---|---|---|---|---|---|---|---|
| 1997–98 | 1 | Superleague A | 7th | | 3 Korać Cup | GS | | |
| 1998–99 | 1 | Superleague A | 5th | | 2 Saporta Cup | R32 | | |
| 1999–00 | 1 | Superleague A | 3rd | | 3 Korać Cup | EF | | |
| 2000–01 | 1 | Superleague A | 2nd | | 2 Saporta Cup | SF | | |
| 2001–02 | 1 | Superleague A | 2nd | | 2 Saporta Cup | QF | | |
| 2002–03 | 1 | Superleague A | 3rd | Winner | 3 FIBA Champions Cup | QF | NEBL | C |
| 2003–04 | 1 | Superleague A | 2nd | Third place | 3 FIBA Europe League | C | | |
| 2004–05 | 1 | Superleague A | 3rd | Runner-up | 3 FIBA Europe League | QF | | |
| 2005–06 | 1 | Superleague A | 4th | Third place | 2 ULEB Cup | EF | | |
| 2006–07 | 1 | Superleague A | 2nd | Runner-up | 2 ULEB Cup | QF | | |
| 2007–08 | 1 | Superleague A | 6th | Semifinals | 2 ULEB Cup | QF | | |
| 2008–09 | 1 | Superleague A | 3rd | Winner | 2 Eurocup | T16 | | |
| 2009–10 | 1 | Superleague A | 3rd | Runner-up | 2 Eurocup | T16 | United League | RU |
| 2010–11 | 1 | PBL | 3rd | | 1 Euroleague | QR2 | United League | 3rd |
| 2010–11 | 1 | PBL | 3rd | | 2 Eurocup | C | United League | 3rd |
| 2011–12 | 1 | PBL | 5th | | 1 Euroleague | QF | United League | RU |
| 2012–13 | 1 | PBL | 6th | | 1 Euroleague | QR2 | United League | QF |
| 2012–13 | 1 | PBL | 6th | | 2 Eurocup | QF | United League | QF |
| 2013–14 | 1 | VTB United League | 3rd | Winner | 2 Eurocup | RU | | |
| 2014–15 | 1 | VTB United League | 6th | Second qualifying | 1 Euroleague | RS | | |
| 2014–15 | 1 | VTB United League | 6th | Second qualifying | 2 Eurocup | SF | | |
| 2015–16 | 1 | VTB United League | 2nd | First qualifying | 2 Eurocup | EF | | |
| 2016–17 | 1 | VTB United League | 5th | Round of 64 | 1 EuroLeague | RS | | |
| 2017–18 | 1 | VTB United League | 4th | | 2 EuroCup | QF | | |
| 2018–19 | 1 | VTB United League | 3rd | First round | 2 EuroCup | SF | | |
| 2019–20 | 1 | VTB United League | 4th | | 2 EuroCup | R16 | | |
| 2020–21 | 1 | VTB United League | 2nd | | 2 EuroCup | RU | | |
| 2021–22 | 1 | VTB United League | 3rd | | 1 EuroLeague | SP | United League Supercup | 3rd |
| 2022–23 | 1 | VTB United League | 1st | Round of 8 | | | United League Supercup | 7th |
| 2023–24 | 1 | VTB United League | 2nd | | | | United League Supercup | 2nd |

== Players ==
=== Current roster ===
Note: Flags indicate national team eligibility at FIBA-sanctioned events. Players may hold other non-FIBA nationalities not displayed.

UNICS roster
Players
Coaches

| Pos. | No. | Nat. | Name | Ht. | Wt. | Age |
|---|---|---|---|---|---|---|
| SG | 1 | (United States) | Adams, Brendan | 1.93 m (6 ft 4 in) | 93 kg (205 lb) | 26 – 3 April 2000 |
| SF | 2 | (Russia) | Belenitskii, Mikhail | 2.04 m (6 ft 8 in) | 104 kg (229 lb) | 24 – 12 September 2002 |
| C | 3 | (United States) | Reynolds, Jalen | 2.08 m (6 ft 10 in) | 113 kg (249 lb) | 33 – 30 December 1992 |
| PF | 6 | (Russia) | Gudumak, Alexandr | 2.03 m (6 ft 8 in) | 111 kg (245 lb) | 33 – 3 July 1993 |
| PG | 8 | (Canada) | Rathan-Mayes, Xavier | 1.91 m (6 ft 3 in) | 91 kg (201 lb) | 32 – 24 April 1994 |
| G/F | 9 | (United States) | Bryce, C. J. | 1.96 m (6 ft 5 in) | 92 kg (203 lb) | 29 – 30 October 1996 |
| SG | 10 | (Russia) | Mikhailovskii, Nikita | 2.01 m (6 ft 7 in) | 90 kg (198 lb) | 26 – 10 September 2000 |
| G | 13 | (Russia) | Zakharov, Denis | 1.93 m (6 ft 4 in) | 88 kg (194 lb) | 33 – 6 August 1993 |
| C | 14 | (Russia) | Klyuev, Sergey | 2.08 m (6 ft 10 in) | 95 kg (209 lb) | 28 – 13 May 1998 |
| G | 31 | (Russia) | Konovalov, Makar | 1.85 m (6 ft 1 in) | 66 kg (146 lb) | 25 – 6 December 2000 |
| C | 33 | (United States) | McCormack, David | 2.08 m (6 ft 10 in) | 113 kg (249 lb) | 27 – 2 July 1999 |
| G/F | 44 | (Russia) | Baburin, Evgeny | 1.90 m (6 ft 3 in) | 94 kg (207 lb) | 39 – 4 July 1987 |
| PF | 81 | (Russia) | Uzinsky, Dmitry | 2.00 m (6 ft 7 in) | 94 kg (207 lb) | 33 – 13 July 1993 |
| G | 95 | (Russia) | Shved, Alexey | 1.98 m (6 ft 6 in) | 86 kg (190 lb) | 37 – 16 December 1988 |
| F/C | 99 | (Croatia) | Šamanić, Luka | 2.08 m (6 ft 10 in) | 112 kg (247 lb) | 26 – 9 January 2000 |

Head coach

- (Croatia) Milan Karakas

Team manager

- (Russia) Mikhail Kolesnikov

Legend

- (C) Team captain
- Injured

- Roster
Updated: September 8, 2026

=== Depth chart ===
| Pos. | Starting 5 | Bench 1 | Bench 2 |
|---|---|---|---|
| C | David McCormack | Jalen Reynolds | Sergey Klyuev |
| PF | Luka Šamanić | Dmitry Uzinsky | Alexandr Gudumak |
| SF | C. J. Bryce | Evgeny Baburin | Mikhail Belenitskii |
| SG | Nikita Mikhailovskii | Brendan Adams | Makar Konovalov |
| PG | Xavier Rathan-Mayes | Alexey Shved | Denis Zakharov |

== Notable players ==
Note: Flags indicate national team eligibility at FIBA-sanctioned events. Players may hold other non-FIBA nationalities not displayed.

Criteria

To appear in this section a player must have either:

- Set a club record or won an individual award while at the club
- Played at least one official international match for their national team at any time
- Played at least one official NBA match at any time.

bold – FIBA World and FIBA Europe champions and medalists

=== Russian ===
- (Russia) Ruslan Avleev (1997–01, 04–06) – 301 games, **19.2 ppg**;
- (Russia) **Petr Samoylenko** (1998–07, 08–13) – **774 games**, 5.8 ppg;
- (Russia) Alexander Petrenko (1999–00) – 58 games, 13.2 ppg;
- (Russia) **Evgeniy Pashutin** (2000–02) – 86 games, 8.5 ppg;
- (Russia) Valentin Kubrakov (2000–02, 03–04) – 121 games, 8.5 ppg;
- (Russia) Aleksei Zozulin (2000–05)
- (Russia) **Igor Kudelin** (2002–03, 06–07) – 35 games, 8.1 ppg;
- (Russia) Sergei Chikalkin (2002–03, 05–09) – 187 games, 10.6 ppg;
- (Russia) **Andrei Fetisov** (2002–03) – 20 games, 6.2 ppg;
- (Russia) Viktor Keirou (2003–05, 07–08) – 83 games, 5.4 ppg;
- (Russia) Vadim Panin (2006–07) – 35 games, 6.1 ppg;
- (Russia) Dmitri Sokolov (2006–09) – 128 games, 6.8 ppg;
- (Russia) **Nikolay Padius** (2007–08, 10–11) – 59 games, 5.3 ppg;
- (Russia) Fedor Likholitov (2009–10) – 10 games, 2.5 ppg;
- (Russia) **Zakhar Pashutin** (2010–12) – 102 games, 4.3 ppg;
- (Russia) **Aleksey Savrasenko** (2011–12) – 56 games, 4.6 ppg;
- (Russia) **Nikita Shabalkin** (2012–13) – 28 games, 6.3 ppg;
- (Russia) Pavel Antipov (2012–15, 2022–23)
- (Russia) Sergei Bykov (2015–2017)
- (Russia) (Israel) **Egor Koulechov** (2020–21)
- (Russia) Andrey Vorontsevich (2021–23)

=== Foreign ===
bold – former NBA players; Olympics, FIBA World and FIBA Europe champions and medalists

Note: Flags indicate national team eligibility at FIBA-sanctioned events. Players may hold other non-FIBA nationalities not displayed.

Criteria

To appear in this section a player must have either:

- Set a club record or won an individual award while at the club
- Played at least one official international match for their national team at any time
- Played at least one official NBA match at any time.

USA

- (United States) Glen Whisby (2000–01) – 51 games, 10.4 ppg;
- (United States) **Anthony Bonner** (2001–02) – 8 games, 14.9 ppg;
- (United States) **Michael McDonald** (2001–02) – 45 games; 12.2 ppg;
- (United States) **Acie Earl** (2001–02) – 30 games, 11.8 ppg;
- (United States) **Dickey Simpkins*** (2002–03) – 38 games, 12.3 ppg;
- (United States) **Kebu Stewart** (2002–03) – 18 games, 8.3 ppg;
- (United States) LaMarr Greer (2003–04) – 41 games; 12 ppg;
- (United States) Joe Ira Clark (2004–05) – 41 games, 7.8 ppg;
- (United States) **Paul Shirley** (2004–05) – 9 games, 4.9 ppg;
- (United States) **Shammond Williams** (2004–05) – 57 games, **17.1 ppg**;
- (United States) **Travis Best** (2005–06) – 40 games, 11.5 ppg;
- (United States) **Samaki Walker*** (2005–06) – 4 games, 7 ppg;
- (United States) Sam Clancy, Jr. (2005–06) – 30 games, 4 ppg;
- (United States) Jarod Stevenson (2006–07) – 32 games; 10.4 ppg;
- (United States) **Mateen Cleaves** (2006–07) – 11 games, 5 ppg;
- (United States) Jerry McCullough (2006–08) – 80 games, 6.8 ppg;
- (United States) Tariq Kirksay (2007–09) – 95 games, 9.3 ppg;
- (United States) **Joseph Forte** (2007–08) – 11 games, 8.4 ppg;
- (United States) **Marc Jackson** (2008–09) – 19 games, 6.5 ppg;
- (United States) Terrell Lyday (2008–13) – **243 games**, 12.2 ppg;
- (United States) Ricky Minard (2010–11) – 48 games, 7.4 pts;
- (United States) **Kelly McCarty** (2010–13) – 114 games, 9.5 ppg;
- (United States) Henry Domercant (2011–12) – 58 games, 13.4 ppg;
- (United States) **Lynn Greer** (2011–12) – 55 games, 8 ppg;
- (United States) Mike Wilkinson (2011–13) – 63 games, 7.1 ppg;
- (United States) Mire Chatman (2012–13) – 45 games, 8.5 ppg;
- (United States) Chuck Eidson (2012–13) – 48 games, 13.6 ppg;
- (United States) **Andrew Goudelock** (2013–14) – 46 games, 19.3 ppg;
- (United States) (Puerto Rico) **John Holland** (2020, 22)
- (United States) Raymar Morgan (2018–20)
- (United States) Errick McCollum (2018–20)
- (United States) **Okaro White** (2020–21)
- (United States) **Nate Wolters** (2020–21)
- (United States) **Isaiah Canaan** (2020–22)
- (United States) John Brown (2020–22)
- (United States) **O. J. Mayo** (2021–22) – 9 games, 7.2 ppg;
- (United States) Jalen Reynolds (2022–present)
- (United States) **Erick Green** (2023–24)

Canada

- (Canada) Melvin Ejim (2017–19)

Australia

- (Australia) **Chris Anstey** (2003–05) – 93 games, 13.1 ppg;
- (Australia) **Nathan Jawai** (2011–12) – 46 games, 8.7 ppg;

Europe

- (North Macedonia) Slobodan Šljivančanin (1998–00) – 117 games, 10 ppg;
- (Serbia) Branislav Vićentić (2001–02) – 29 games, 10.4 ppg;
- (Serbia) Oliver Popović (2001–03) – 80 games, 14.6 ppg;
- (Bosnia and Herzegovina) Damir Mršić (2002–03) – 31 games, 7.7 ppg;
- (Lithuania) **Eurelijus Žukauskas** (2002–04) – 78 games, 10 ppg;
- (Estonia) **Martin Müürsepp** (2001–02, 03–04, 05–06) – 86 games, 11.3 ppg;
- (Lithuania) **Saulius Štombergas** (2003–04, 05–07, 09–10) – 144 games, 11 ppg;
- (Serbia) Stevan Nađfeji (2004–05) – 40 games, 7.4 ppg;
- (Latvia) Kaspars Kambala (2004–05) – 54 games, 14.5 ppg;
- (Lithuania) **Kšyštof Lavrinovič** (2005–07) – 78 games, 12.7 ppg;
- (Lithuania) **Darjuš Lavrinovič** (2006–08) – 68 games, 12.9 ppg;
- (Serbia) Duško Savanović (2006–08) – 71 games, 10.3 ppg;
- (Slovenia) Marko Tušek (2007–08) – 36 games, 10.1 ppg;
- (Croatia) Krešimir Lončar (2008–10) – 114 games, 11.8 ppg;
- (Croatia) Marko Popović (2008–11) – 142 games, 13.9 ppg;
- (Belarus) Vladimir Veremeenko (2008–13) – **249 games**, 8.8 ppg;
- (Poland) **Maciej Lampe** (2009–11) – 96 games, **15.9 ppg**;
- (Slovenia) Hasan Rizvić (2010–11) – 64 games, 5.4 ppg;
- (Montenegro) **Slavko Vraneš** (2010–11) – 39 games, 2.6 ppg;
- (Slovenia) **Boštjan Nachbar** (2011–12) – 22 games, 3.6 ppg;
- (Greece) Ian Vougioukas (2012–13) – 47 games, 10.9 ppg;
- (Greece) Nikos Zisis (2013–14)
- (United States) (Israel) D'or Fischer (2014–15)
- (Greece) **Kostas Kaimakoglou** (2012–2021) – 37 games, 12.5 ppg;
- (Lithuania) **Artūras Milaknis** (2015–16)
- (Andorra) (Spain) Quino Colom (2015–18)
- (United States) (North Macedonia) Jordan Theodore (2019–21)
- (United States) (Israel) Alex Tyus (2019–20)
- (Croatia) **Mario Hezonja** (2021–22)
- (Italy) Marco Spissu (2021–22)
- (France) Louis Labeyrie (2022–2025)
- (North Macedonia) Nenad Dimitrijević (2022–23) – VTB United League playoffs MVP;

Africa

- (Senegal) Maurice Ndour (2017–19)
- (United States) (Senegal) Pierriá Henry (2018–19) – EuroCup Regular Season MVP
- (Nigeria) Tonye Jekiri (2021–22)

(Serbia) Milan Gurović (2004) and (Turkey) Hüseyin Beşok (2005) shortly were under contract with UNICS Kazan, but never played a single game for the team.

(*) former NBA champions

== Head coaches ==
bold – Olympics, FIBA World and FIBA Europe champions and medalists

- (Russia) **Stanislav Eremin** – 2000–06;
- (Lithuania) **Antanas Sireika** – 2006–08;
- (Serbia) Aco Petrović – 2008–09;
- (Lithuania) **Valdemaras Chomičius** – 2009–10;
- (Russia) **Evgeniy Pashutin** – 2010–12;
- (Serbia) Aco Petrović – 2012–2013
- (Russia) **Stanislav Eremin** – 2013;
- (Italy) Andrea Trinchieri – 2013–2014
- (Greece) Argiris Pedoulakis – 2014–2014
- (Russia) Evgeniy Pashutin – 2014–2017
- (Greece) Dimitrios Priftis – 2017–2021
- (Croatia) Velimir Perasović – 2021–
