= Russian Basketball Cup =

Russian basketball competition

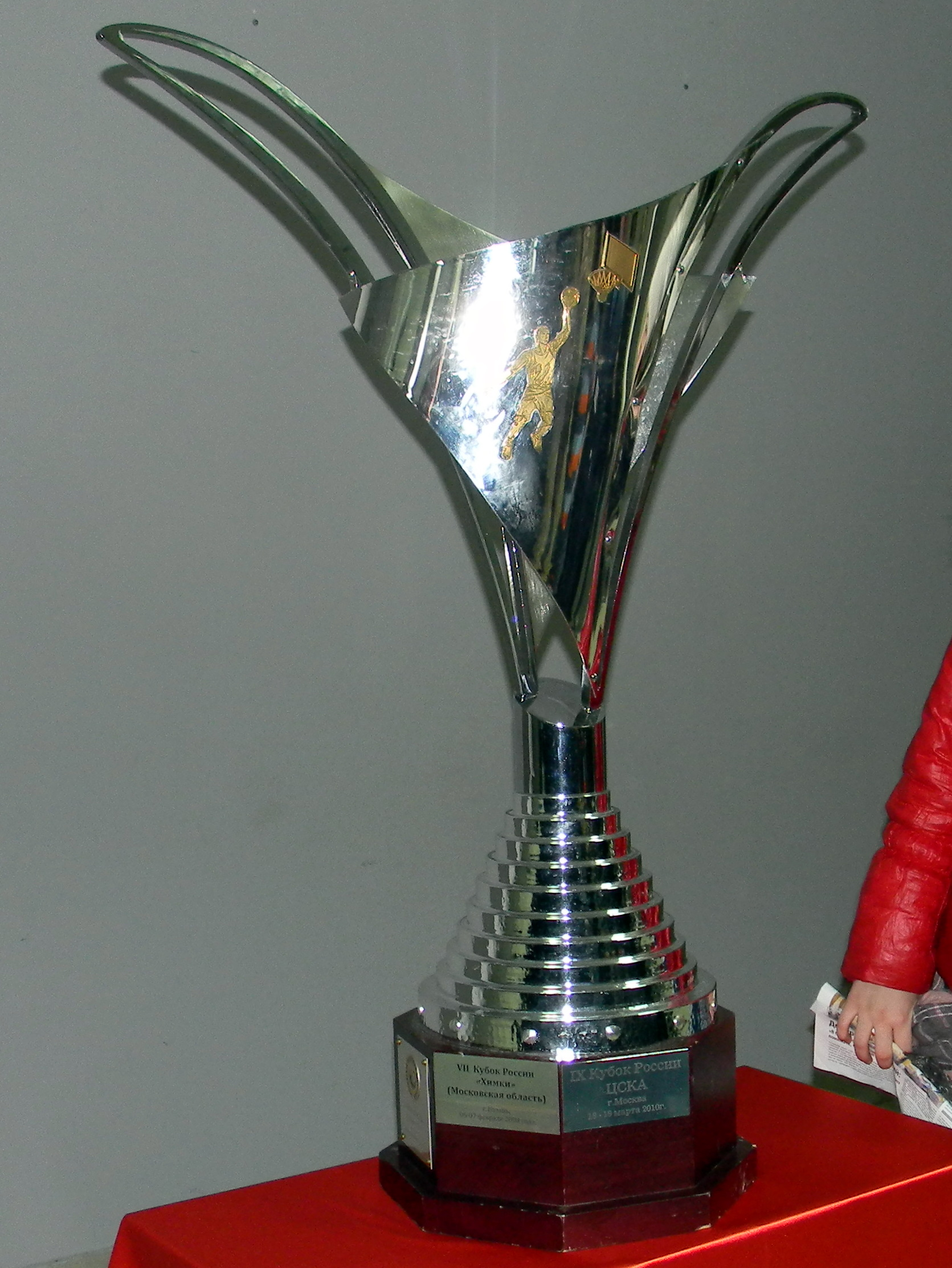
- The Russian Cup trophy
- Sport: Basketball
- Founded: 2000
- Country: Russia
- Most recent champions: Zenit Saint Petersburg (1st title)
- Most titles: CSKA Moscow (4 titles)
- Related competitions: BSL, VTB
- Website: russiabasket.ru/competitions/1938/kubok-rossii

The Russian Basketball Cup is the primary professional national domestic basketball cup competition of Russia.

== History ==
After the cease of the USSR Basketball Cup in 1987, the Russian Federation did not launch any Cup competition in the following years despite the fact that the Russian Basketball Super League 1 had started in 1992. The first cup tournament took place in the year 2000 with the Final Four being hosted at Sochi. It was not held in the following two seasons, but it returned in 2002. Starting from the 2014-15 season most of the VTB League clubs withdrew as the Russian Federation did not allow the use of foreign players in the competition resulting in only 3 VTB teams (Khimki, Krasnye Krylia and Krasny Oktyabr) participating. BC UNICS was the last club from the VTB League to win the trophy in 2014. The last two seasons (2020-22) no VTB club applied to participate in the competition as normally two or three teams would join annually. Current holders are BC Samara.

== Final Fours ==
Year	Winner	Runner-up	Semifinalists		City	MVP
1999–2000	Lokomotiv Mineralnye Vody	Spartak Saint Petersburg	Ural Great (3rd)	Dinamo-Avtodor Volgograd (4th)	Sochi	—N/a
2002–03	UNICS	CSKA Moscow	Ural Great	Khimki	Ekaterinburg	—N/a
2003–04	Ural Great	CSKA Moscow	UNICS (3rd)	Khimki (4th)	Perm	—N/a
2004–05	CSKA Moscow	UNICS	Dynamo Moscow (3rd)	Khimki (4th)	Moscow	—N/a
2005–06	CSKA Moscow	Khimki	UNICS (3rd)	Triumph Lyubertsy (4th)	Khimki	(Greece) Theo Papaloukas
2006–07	CSKA Moscow	UNICS	Dynamo Moscow	Triumph Lyubertsy	Kazan	(Russia) Alexey Savrasenko
2007–08	Khimki	CSKA Moscow	UNICS	Dynamo Moscow	Vidnoye	(Poland) Maciej Lampe
2008–09	UNICS	Dynamo Moscow	CSKA Moscow (3rd)	Triumph Lyubertsy (4th)	Lyubertsy	(Croatia) Krešimir Lončar
2009–10	CSKA Moscow	UNICS	Spartak Saint Petersburg (3rd)	Khimki (4th)	Moscow	(Russia) Victor Khryapa
2010–11 (Note: In the 2010–11 season, 4 teams of the PBL did not participate in the Cup: CSKA Moscow, Dynamo Moscow, Khimki, and UNICS.)	Spartak Saint Petersburg	Nizhny Novgorod	Enisey Krasnoyarsk (3rd)	Lokomotiv Kuban (4th)	Krasnoyarsk	(North Macedonia) Pero Antić
2011–12 (Note: In the 2011–12 season, 5 teams of the PBL did not participate in the Cup: CSKA Moscow, Enisey, Khimki, Lokomotiv-Kuban and UNICS.)	Krasnye Krylia	Spartak Primorye	Spartak Saint Petersburg (3rd)	Ural Ekaterinburg (4th)	Samara	(United States) Brion Rush
2012–13	Krasnye Krylia	Spartak Saint Petersburg	Spartak Primorye (3rd)	Enisey Krasnoyarsk (4th)	Vladivostok	(United States) Aaron Miles
2013–14	UNICS	Lokomotiv Kuban	Khimki	Krasny Oktyabr	Kazan, Krasnodar	(United States) Drew Goudelock
2014–15 (Note: From the 2014–15 competition and onwards, teams were only allowed to play with Russian players; which led to the withdrawals of most of the top tier Russian teams.)	Novosibirsk	Dynamo Moscow	Spartak Primorye (3rd)	Krasnye Krylia (4th)	Novosibirsk	(Russia) Sergey Tokarev
2015–16	Parma	Zenit Saint Petersburg	Temp-SUMZ-UGMK (3rd)	Samara (4th)	Moscow	(Russia) Alexander Vinnik
2016–17	Novosibirsk	Sakhalin	Parma (3rd)	Temp-SUMZ-UGMK (4th)	Ekaterinburg	(Russia) Sergey Tokarev (2)
2017–18	Lokomotiv Kuban	Nizhny Novgorod	Novosibirsk (3rd)	Irkut (4th)	Krasnodar	(Russia) Dmitry Kulagin
2018–19	Parma	Nizhny Novgorod	Novosibirsk (3rd)	Spartak Saint Petersburg (4th)	Nizhny Novgorod	(Russia) Alexander Platunov
2019–20	Samara	Temp-SUMZ-UGMK	Vostok-65 (3rd)	Uralmash (4th)	Samara, Revda	(Russia) Vladimir Pichurkov
2020–21	Temp-SUMZ-UGMK	Vostok-65	Samara (3rd)	Kupol-Rodniki (4th)	Revda, Yuzhno-Sakhalinsk	(Russia) Viktor Zaryazhko
2021–22	Samara	Temp-SUMZ-UGMK	Runa (3rd)	Novosibirsk (4th)	Samara, Revda	(Russia) Maxim Sheleketo
2022–23	Nizhny Novgorod	Zenit Saint Petersburg	MBA Moscow (3rd)	Khimki (4th)	Saint Petersburg	(United States) Trent Frazier
2023–24	Zenit Saint Petersburg	Nizhny Novgorod	Uralmash Yekaterinburg (3rd)	MBA Moscow (4th)	Yekaterinburg	(United States) Trent Frazier (2)
2024–25	Uralmash Yekaterinburg	Nizhny Novgorod	MBA Moscow (3rd)	Khimki (4th)	Nizhny Novgorod	(United States) Hayden Dalton

== Performance by club ==
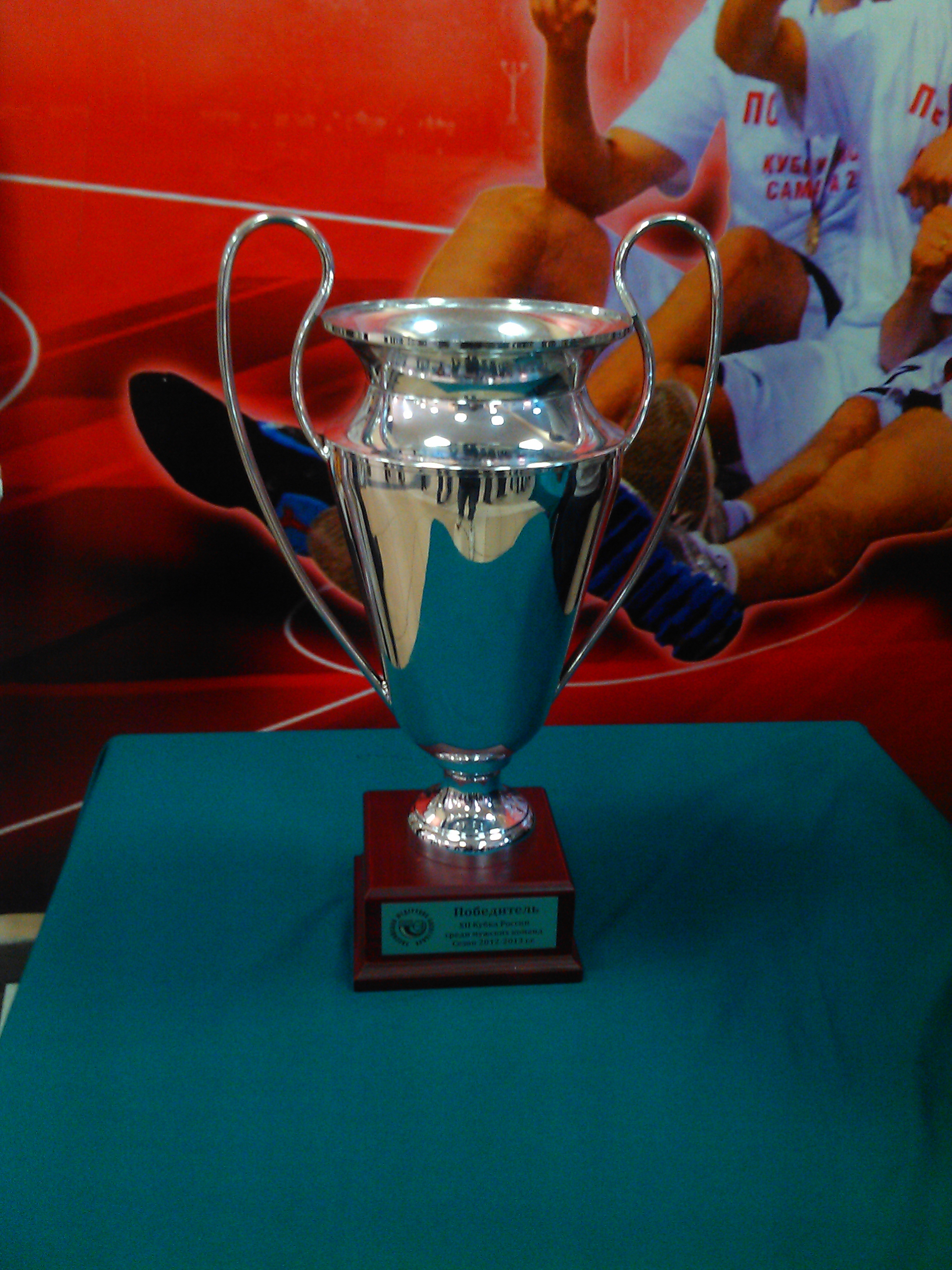
Russian Basketball Cup 2012–2013

Club	Winners	Runners-up	Winning years	Runner-up years
CSKA Moscow	4	3	2004–05, 2005–06, 2006–07, 2009–10	2002–03, 2003–04, 2007–08
UNICS	3	3	2002–03, 2008–09, 2013–14	2004–05, 2006–07, 2009–10
Lokomotiv Kuban	2	1	1999–00, 2017–18	2013–14
Krasnye Krylia	2	–	2011–12, 2012–13	
Novosibirsk	2	–	2014–15, 2016–17	
Parma Basket	2	–	2015–16, 2018–19	
Samara	2	–	2019–20, 2021–22	
Nizhny Novgorod	1	5	2022–23	2010–11, 2017–18, 2018–19, 2023–24, 2024–25
Temp-SUMZ-UGMK	1	2	2020–21	2019–20, 2021–22
Spartak Saint Petersburg	1	2	2010–11	1999–00, 2012–13
Zenit Saint Petersburg	1	2	2023–24	2015–16, 2022–23
Khimki	1	1	2007–08	2005–06
Ural Great	1	–	2003–04	
Uralmash Yekaterinburg	1	–	2024–25	
Dynamo Moscow	–	2		2008-09, 2014–15
Spartak Primorye	–	1		2011–12
Sakhalin	–	1		2016–17
Vostok-65	–	1		2020–21

== Predecessor competition ==
- USSR Cup: (1949–1987)

== See also ==
- Russian Professional Championship: (1991–present)
- Russian Super League 1: (1992–present)
- Russian Professional League: (2010–2013)
- VTB United League: (2008–present)
- USSR Cup: (1949–1987)
- USSR Premier League: (1923–1992)
- Russian basketball league system
- Basketball in Russia
