= Russian Basketball All-Star Game =

- Status: Inactive
- Frequency: Periodically
- Inaugurated: 1994-95
- Most recent: 2010-11
- Organizer: Russian Basketball Federation; PBL

The Russian Basketball All-Star Game (also known as USL All-Star Game) was an annual basketball event in Russia, organised by the Basketball Super League and the PBL. It was launched in 1995 as the All-Star Game of the Basketball Super League, Russia's top-tier. The event was held annually for its first six years and consisted of an all-star game, a three-point shoot and a slam-dunk exhibition. Many notable players like Andrei Kirilenko, Gintaras Einikis, Trajan Langdon and Valeri Tikhonenko have played in the All-Star Game.

== History ==
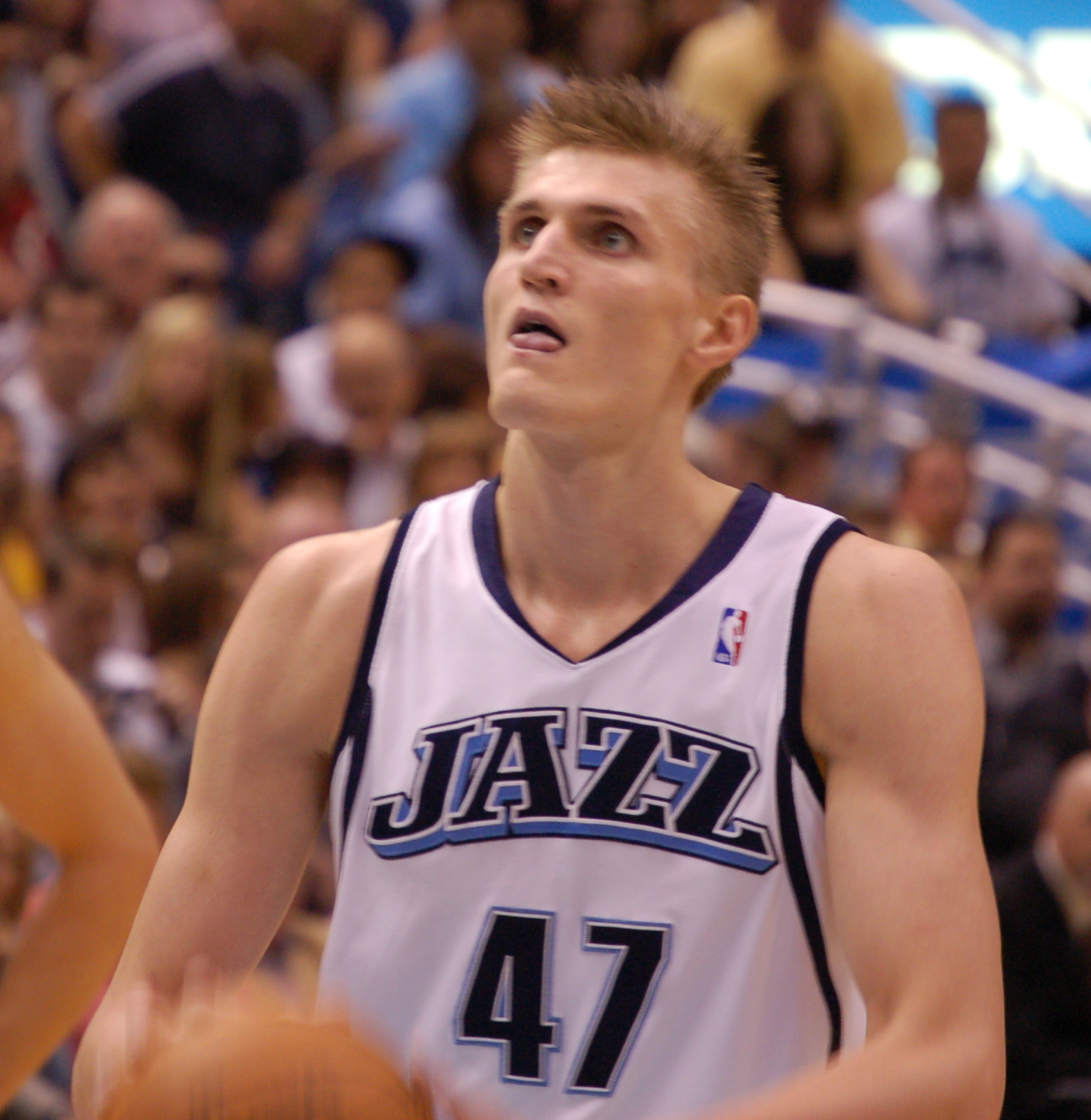
Andrei Kirilenko played in the 1999 edition.

The first edition took place in Saint Petersburg during the 1994-95 season featuring the best players of the Basketball Super League. The following two years the event was hosted in Moscow, while the 1999 edition was held in Perm. The fifth All-Star Game was held in Kazan on 23 April 2000, with Andrei Kirilenko receiving the majority of the votes (212).

On 22 December 2006, an exhibition All-Star Game took place at the Yubileyny Sports Palace, in Saint Petersburg in front of 7,000 fans, to celebrate the 100th anniversary of Russian basketball. For the first time, there were mixed teams on the court, consisting of both men and women. During half-time the five best Soviet players of the 20th century for men and women were announced. Ivan Edeshko, Sergey Belov, Andrei Kirilenko, Alexander Belov and Arvydas Sabonis were the men's starting five. There were no slam-dunk contests or other events.

On 26 March 2011, the short-lived PBL who had replaced the Basketball Super League as the country's top competition brought the All-Star Game back hosting it in Nizhny Novgorod. The PBL All-Star Game took place in front of 3,000 spectators. Despite the fact that the PBL lasted two more seasons, there was no other All-Star Game organized by the league. In 2013 the PBL was aboslished in order for the Eastern European Professional Basketball League to be formed (known now as VTB United League) including clubs from former Soviet countries. In 2017 the VTB United League All-Star Game was launched.

== List of games ==
Bold: Team that won the game.

Super League All-Star Game

Year	Date	Venue	City	Team 1	Score	Team 2	MVP	Club
1995		Nova Arena	Saint Petersburg	East		West		
1996		CSKA Palace of Sports	Moscow	East		West		
1997	April 5	CSKA Palace of Sports	Moscow	East		West		
1998	Not held							
1999	April 12	Universal Sports Palace	Perm	East	107-**138**	**West**	(Russia) Alexei Pegushin (Russia) Valeri Tikhonenko	Ural Great Perm; Dynamo Moscow
2000	April 23		Kazan	East		West		
2001	April 23	Palace of Sports	Rostov	Russians		Foreigners		

100th Anniversary All-Star Game

Year	Date	Venue	City	Team 1	Score	Team 2	MVP	Club
2006	22 December	Yubileyny Sports Palace	Saint Petersburg	**Red Team**	'**106**-98	White Team	(Russia) Egor Vyaltsev	Ural Great Perm

PBL All-Star Game

Year	Date	Venue	City	Team 1	Score	Team 2	MVP	Club
2011	26 March	Trade Union Sport Palace	Nizhny Novgorod	**Russian All-Stars**	'**141**-120	Legion All-Stars	(Russia) Sergei Monia	Dynamo Moscow

== Score sheets ==
- 1st All-Star Game 1994-95:

DATE:
VENUE: Nova Arena, Saint Petersburg
SCORE: East - West

EAST: Evgeny Kisurin, Sergey Panov, Sergei Ivanov, Vasily Karasev, Evgeny Pashutin (starters)

WEST: Valery Tikhonenko, Igor Grachev, Spencer Dunkley, Zakhar Pashutin, Dirk Searls (starters)

- 2nd All-Star Game 1995-96:

DATE:
VENUE: CSKA Palace of Sports, Moscow
SCORE: East - West

EAST: Evgeny Kisurin, Valery Daineko, Julius Nwosu, Vasily Karasev, Igor Kudelin (starters)

WEST: Valery Tikhonenko, Tony Turner, Gintaras Einikis, Evgeny Pashutin, Sergei Chikalkin (starters)

- 3d All-Star Game 1996-97:

DATE: April 5, 1997
VENUE: CSKA Palace of Sports, Moscow
SCORE: East - West

EAST: Igor Kudelin, Sergey Panov, Vitaly Nosov, Valery Daineko, Sergei Bazarevich (starters) - Alexei Pegushin

WEST: Valery Tikhonenko, Zakhar Pashutin, Gintaras Einikis, Evgeny Pashutin, Darius Lukminas (starters)

- 4th All-Star Game 1998-99:

DATE: April 12, 1999
VENUE: Universal Sports Palace, Perm, att: 7100
SCORE: East - West 107-138

EAST: Andrey Yurtaev (DNP), Andrey Olbrecht 6, Alexander Bashminov 9, Jeffrey Rodgers 14, Konstantin Kosmatov 2 (starters) - Alexei Pegushin 17, Andrey Sheiko 7, Mikhail Mikhailov* (Aris BC) 10, Gadashev 13, Shushakov 8, Bulantsev 9, Tsymbal 3, Bulantsev 9

WEST: Valery Daineko 22, Sergey Panov 6, Vasily Karasev 21, Zakhar Pashutin, Gintaras Einikis (starters) - Valery Tikhonenko 15, Andrei Kirilenko* 12, Sergei Chikalkin 6, Igor Kudelin 14, Evgeny Pashutin 9, Vladimir Karankevich 7, Petrenko* 8, Antipov 4, Zakhar Pashutin (DNP)

- Injured Zakhar Pashutin was replaced by Andrei Kirilenko. Also Andrey Yurtaev was replaced by Mikhail Mikhailov (from Greek club Aris BC) and Petrenko replaced Ruslan Avleev.

- 5th All-Star Game 1999-00:

DATE: April 23, 2000
VENUE: Kazan
SCORE: East - West

EAST: Tomas Pacesas, Andrey Sheiko, Alexander Bashminov, Igor Kurashov, Sergei Chikalkin (starters)

WEST: Ruslan Avleev, Valentin Kubrakov, Andrei Kirilenko, Vasily Karasev, Gintaras Einikis (starters) -

- Anniversary All-Star Game 2006-07:

DATE: December 22, 2006
VENUE: Yubileyny Sports Palace, Saint Petersburg, att: 7500
SCORE: Reds - Whites 106-98

RED TEAM: Alexey Savrasenko, Tatyana Shchegoleva (female), Anton Ponkrashov, Svetlana Abrosimova (female), Nikita Kurbanov (starters) - Irina Osipova (female), Fedor Likholitov, Marina Karpunina (female), Nikita Shabalkin, Ekaterina Demagina (female), Egor Vyaltsev , Irina Sokolovskaya (female), Sergey Bykov. Coach: Evgeny Pashutin*, ass: Evgeny Gomelsky

WHITE TEAM: Maria Stepanova (female), Nikita Morgunov, Olga Arteshina (female), Natalia Vodopyanova (female), Sergei Monya (starters) - Pyotr Samoilenko, Oksana Rakhmatulina (female), Vitaly Fridzon, Elena Danilochkina (female), Nikolai Padius, Ekaterina Lisina (female), Elena Karpova (female), Fedor Dmitriev, Coach: Igor Grudin, ass: Stanislav Eremin

- Evgeny Pashutin replaced David Blatt.

- PBL All-Star Game 2010-11:

DATE: March 26, 2011
VENUE: Trade Union Sport Palace, Nizhny Novgorod, att: 3000
SCORE: Russians - Foreigners 141-120

RUSSIANS: John Robert Holden, Anton Ponkrashov 12, Sergei Monya 16, Andrey Vorontsevich 26, Alexander Kaun 20 (starters) - Evgeny Voronov 21, Egor Vyaltsev 2, Alexey Surovtsev (DNP), Vitaly Fridzon 27, Kelly McCarthy 3, Valery Likhodey 4, Alexey Zhukanenko 10. Coach: Evgeny Pashutin

FOREIGNERS: Keith Langford 25, Trajan Langdon 2, Ramunas Siskauskas 2, Gerald Green 24, Maciej Lampe 26 (starters) - Patrick Beverley (DNP), Jamont Gordon 23, Henry Domercant (DNP), Dragan Labovic, Mike Wilkinson 4, Kresimir Loncar 7, Jeremiah Massey (DNP), Ivan Paunich 7. Coaxh: Kestutis Kemzura

- Ivan Paunich was a replacement for the foreign injured players.

== All-Star Game events ==
=== Three-Point Shoot Contest ===
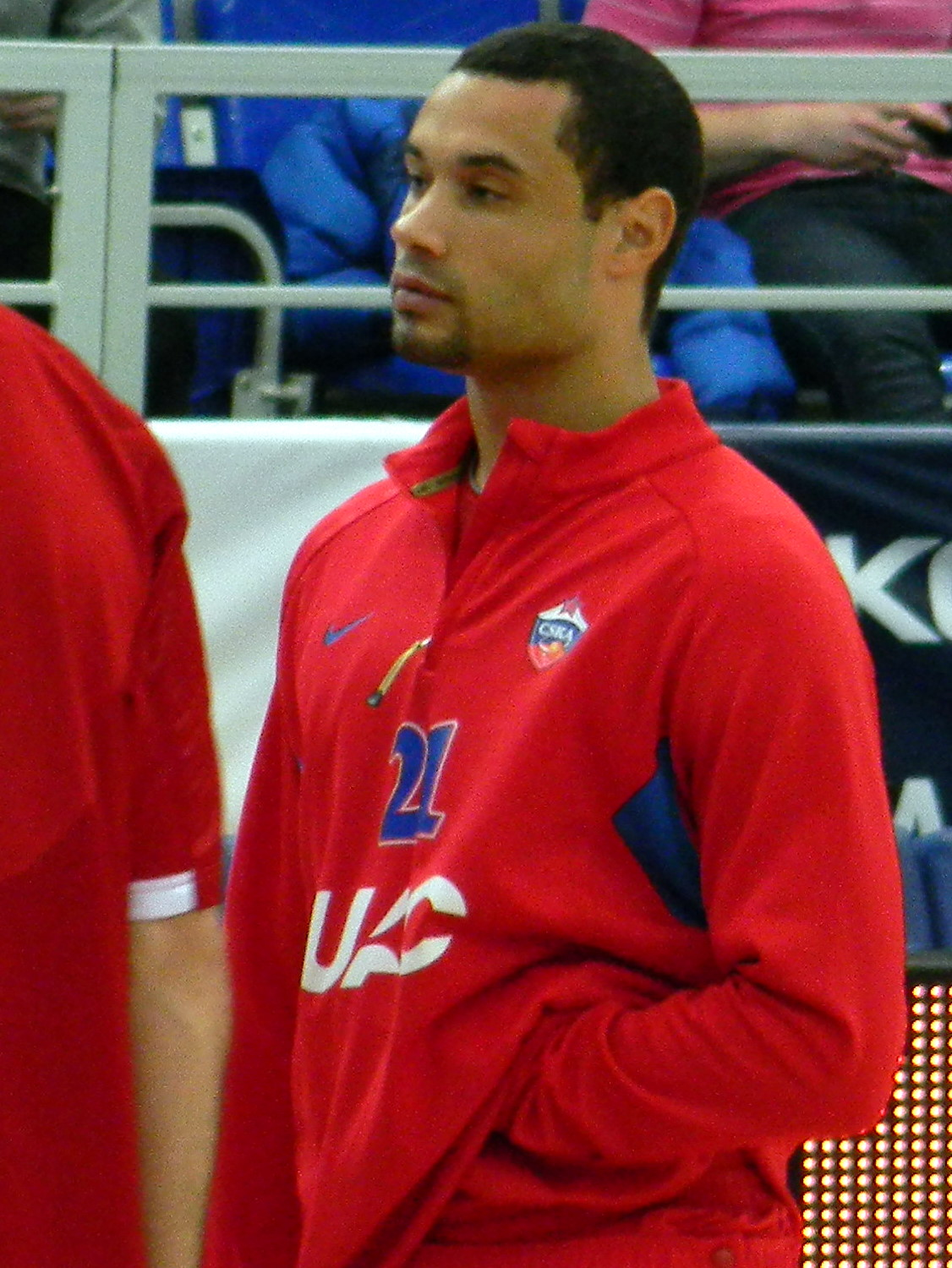
Trajan Langdon was the Three-Point Shoot Contest winner in 2011.

Year	Winner	Team	Runner-up	Team
1999	(Russia) Roman Dvinyaninov	Ural Great Perm	(Kazakhstan) Yuri Leonov	
2006	Not held			
2011	(United States) Trajan Langdon	PBC CSKA Moscow	(Serbia) Dragan Labovic	BC Enisey

=== Slam-Dunk champions ===
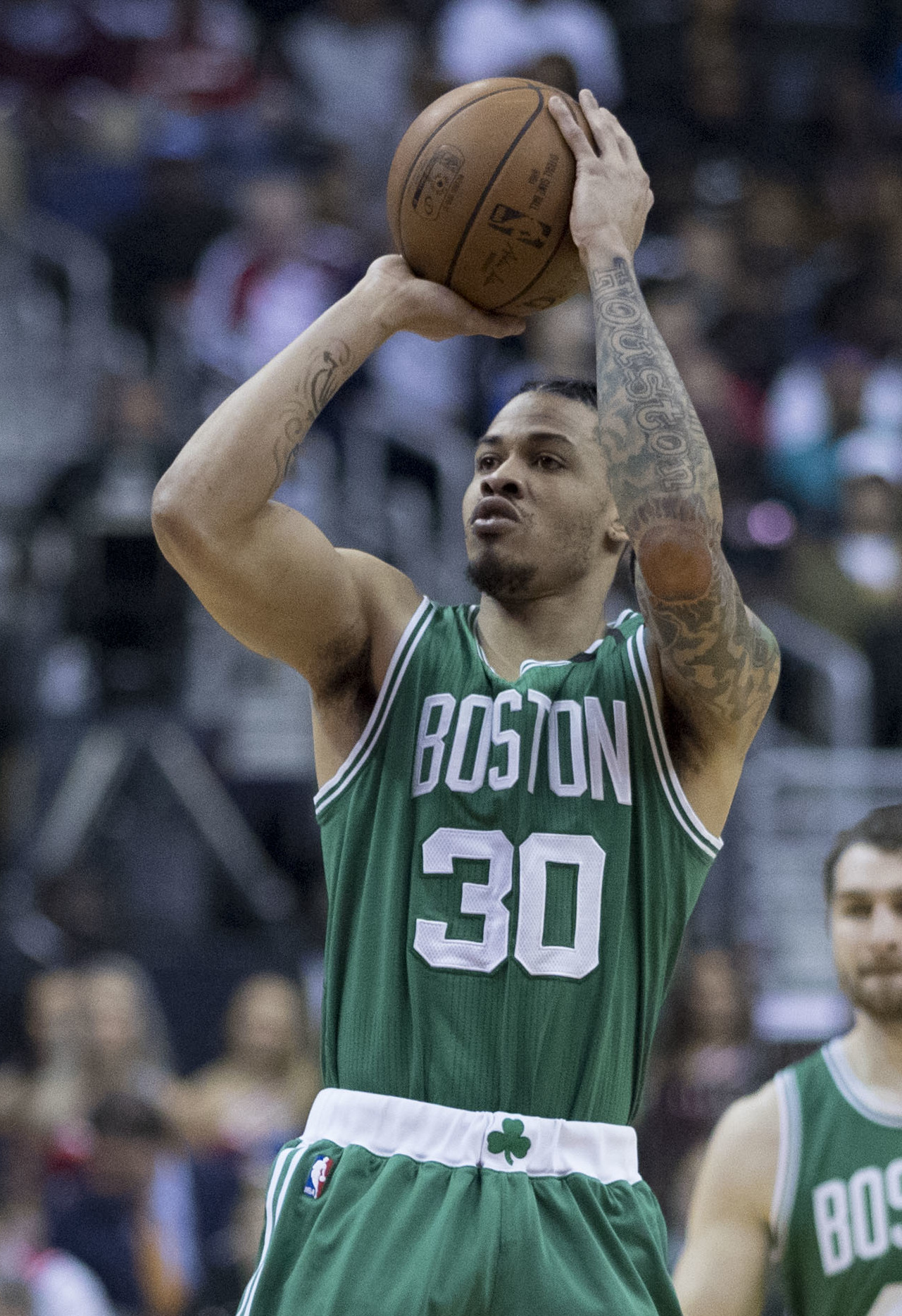
Gerald Green was the slam-dunk winner in 2011.

Year	Winner	Team	Runner-up	Team
1999	(Russia) Andrei Kirilenko	PBC CSKA Moscow	(Russia) Mikhail Vikhnevich	BC Enisey
2006	Not held			
2011	(United States) Gerald Green	Krasnye Krylia	(Russia) Valery Likhodey	Triumph Lyubertsy

== Topscorers ==
Year	Player	Points	Team
1999	(Belarus) (Russia) Valeri Daineko	22	PBC CSKA Moscow
2006	(Russia) Egor Vyaltsev	34	Ural Great Perm
2011	(Russia) Vitaly Fridzon	27	PBC CSKA Moscow

== All-Stars with most votes ==
Bold: Player with most votes overall per year.

East

Edition	Player	Team	Votes
1995	(Russia) **Valery Tikhonenko**	CSK VVS-Samara	1249
1996	(Russia) **Valery Tikhonenko**	CSK VVS-Samara	587
1997	(Lithuania) **Gintaras Einikis**	Avtodor Saratov	363
1999	(Russia) Aleksandr Bashminov	Ural Great Perm	212
2000	(Russia) Sergei Chikalkin	Ural Great Perm	243

Russians

Edition	Player	Team	Votes
2011	(Russia) Sergei Monya	PBC CSKA Moscow	2594

West

Edition	Player	Team	Votes
1995	(Russia) Evgeny Kisurin	PBC CSKA Moscow	1224
1996	(Russia) **Evgeny Kisurin**	PBC CSKA Moscow	587
1997	(Russia) Igor Kudelin	PBC CSKA Moscow	289
1999	(Russia) **Vasily Karasev**	PBC CSKA Moscow	255
2000	(Russia) **Vasily Karasev** and (Russia) **Andrei Kirilenko**	PBC CSKA Moscow; PBC CSKA Moscow	212

Foreigners

Edition	Player	Team	Votes
2011	(United States) **Keith Langford**	PBC CSKA Moscow	2074

== Players with most selections ==
Player	All-Star	Editions	Notes
(Russia) Valeri Tikhonenko	5	1995, 1996, 1997, 1999, 2000	1x MVP (1999)
(Lithuania) Gintaras Einikis	4	1996, 1997, 1999, 2000	
(Russia) Sergei Panov	4	1995, 1997, 1999, 2000	
(Russia) Evgeny Pashutin	4	1995, 1996, 1997, 1999	
(Russia) Vasily Karasev	4	1995, 1996, 1999, 2000	
(Russia) Zakhar Pashutin	3	1995, 1997, 1999	
(Russia) Igor Kudelin	3	1996, 1997, 2000	
(Belarus) (Russia) Valery Daineko	3	1996, 1997, 1999	
(Russia) Sergei Chikalkin	3	1996, 1999, 2000	
(Russia) Sergei Bazarevich	2	1997, 1999	
(Russia) Andrei Fetisov	2	1997, 1998	
(Russia) Mikhail Mikhailov	2	1999, 2001	
(Russia) Sergei Monia	2	2006, 2011	1x MVP (2011)
(Russia) Vitaly Fridzon	2	2006, 2011	
(Russia) Anton Ponkrashov	2	2006, 2011	
(Russia) Evgeny Kisurin	2	1995, 1996	
(Russia) Anton Ponkrashov	2	2006, 2011	
(Russia) Andrei Kirilenko	2	1999, 2000	

=== Other notable participants ===
- (Nigeria) Julius Nwosu (1996)
- (Lithuania) Tomas Pačėsas (2000)
- (Lithuania) Ramunas Siskauskas (2011)
- (United States) (Russia) John Robert Holden (2011)
- (United States) (Russia) Kelly McCarthy (2011)
- (Poland) Maciej Lampe (2011)
- (United States) Keith Langford (2011)

== See also ==
- VTB United League All-Star Game

== Sources ==
- 1995-2000 rosters (in Russian) at sport-express.ru
