= Russian Basketball Super League 2 =

Sports league

- Organising body: Russian Basketball Federation
- Founded: 2000; 26 years ago
- First season: 2000–01
- Country: Russia
- Confederation: FIBA Europe (Europe)
- Number of teams: 11
- Level on pyramid: 3
- Promotion to: Russian Basketball Super League 1
- Relegation to: Russian Basketball Super League 3 (Note: Founded as Higher League in 1994 serving as Russia's as second tier.)
- Domestic cup: Russian Cup
- Current champions: Dynamo Ufa (1st title) (2024–25)
- Most championships: Metallurg Magnitogorsk (2 titles)
- Website: russiabasket.ru/competitions/1936/superliga

The Russian Basketball Super League 2 (Russian: Баскетбольная Cуперлига 2), formerly known as the Russian Basketball Super League B, is a men's professional basketball league. It was the second-tier division of the Russian professional basketball pyramid from 2000 until 2010, but it currently serves as the third tier. The league is run by the Russian Basketball Federation (RBF).

== History ==
It was founded in 2000 as Russia's second division. It consisted of 19 clubs, divided into two groups. Until then, Russia's second tier was the Higher League (now known as Russian Basketball Super League 3) founded in 1994.

After being the second-tier division of Russian basketball, from its first season in 2000–01, the Super League B was relegated to being the third -tier division of Russian basketball after the 2009–10 season, after the introduction of the 2010–11 season of the Russian Professional Basketball League (PBL).

In 2010, it was renamed as Super League 2. The 2010–11 season featured 11 clubs.

The league changed its name from Higher League to Superleague 2 in 2015. In 2022, it was renamed back to Higher League. Throughout years, the number of participants in the league ranged from 9 to 16 teams.

== Criteria for promotion ==
Until 2010, the winner of Super League B was qualified for Super League A, if the following conditions were met:

- The arena where the club's home matches were held should accommodate at least 2,000 spectators
- Financial guarantees of participation in the championship (contracts with sponsors, etc.), confirming the minimum source of income for a full season.

== Super League 2 (second-tier league) champions 2000–2010 ==
- 2001: Arsenal Tula
- 2002: Dynamo Moscow
- 2003: VC Lokomotiv Novosibirsk
- 2004: Universitet Yugra Surgut
- 2005: Spartak Primorye
- 2006: Standard Togliatti
- 2007: Yenisey Krasnoyarsk
- 2008: Magnitogorsk State Technical University
- 2009: BC Avtodor Saratov
- 2010: BC Nizhny Novgorod

== Super League 2 (third-tier league) champions 2011–present ==
- 2011: Ataman Rostov
- 2012: Planeta-Universitet Ukhta Basketball
- 2013: Kupol-Rodniki Izhevsk
- 2014: Neftekhimik Tobolsk
- 2015: Ruskon Mordovia
- 2016: Spartak Saint Petersburg
- 2017: BK Tambov
- 2018: BK Burevestnik Yaroslav
- 2019: Ufimets Ufa
- 2020: Cheboksarskiye Yastreby Cheboksari
- 2021: BC Barnaul Altayskiy Kray
- 2022: Metallurg Magnitogorsk
- 2023: Bars RGEU Rostov
- 2024: Metallurg Magnitogorsk (2)
- 2025: Dynamo Ufa

== Topscorers ==
Second tier

Year	Player	Team	Points
2000–01	(Russia) Sergei Ivanov	Dinamo Avtodor Volgograd	1070
2001–02	(Russia) Igor Dergunov	Sakha-Yakutsk	1046
2002–03	(Russia) Sergey Pakhomov	Metallurg University	902
2003–04	(Russia) Alexey Ekimov	Konti St. Petersburg	831
2004–05	(Russia) Ilya Alexandrov	Metallurg University	1101
2005–06	(Russia) Ilya Alexandrov (2)	Metallurg University	1247
2006–07	(Russia) Alexander Golubev	BC Ural Yekaterinburg	748
2007–08	(Russia) Alexander Golubev (2)	Metallurg University	973
2008–09	(Russia) Alexey Kuznetsov	Ruskon Mordovia	908
2009–10	(Russia) Maxim Sinelnikov	Metallurg University	809

Third tier

Year	Player	Team	PPG
2013–14	(Russia) Vladislav Lotarev	Kupol-Rodniki Izhevsk	18.5
2014–15	(Russia) Dmitry Zagnoyko	Kupol-Rodniki Izhevsk	20.2
2015–16	(Russia) Victor Zvarykin	Stroitiel Engels	19.1
2016–17	(Russia) Andrei Semenov	Runa Basket Moscow	20.6
2017–18	(Russia) Aleksey Almushev	Rusichi Kursk	19.0
2018–19	(Russia) Andrei Semenov (2)	Runa Basket Moscow	25.1
2019–20	(Russia) Timofei Gerasimov	Lokomotiv Kuban II	25.1
2020–21	(Russia) Aleksey Fedorchuk	BC Mitsu Basket Lipetska Oblast	17.9
2021–22	(Russia) Dmitriy Doynikov	Rusichi Kursk	22.7
2022–23	(Russia) Pavel Kryaschenko	Dynamo-MGTU Maykop	19.0
2023–24	(Russia) Danila Donskov	Dynamo-MGTU Maykop	18.1
2024–25	(Russia) Konstantin Klementiev	Dynamo-MGTU Maykop	16.5

== Name history ==
- Super League B (2000–2010)
- Super League 2 (2010–present)

== See also ==
- Russian basketball league system
- Basketball in Russia
- Russian Professional Championship: (1991–present)
- Russian Professional League: (2010–2013)
- Russian Cup: (1999–present)
- VTB United League: (2008–present)
- USSR Premier League: (1923–1992)
- USSR Cup: (1949–1987)
- Russian Basketball All-Star Game
