= Kahlil Dukes =

American basketball player

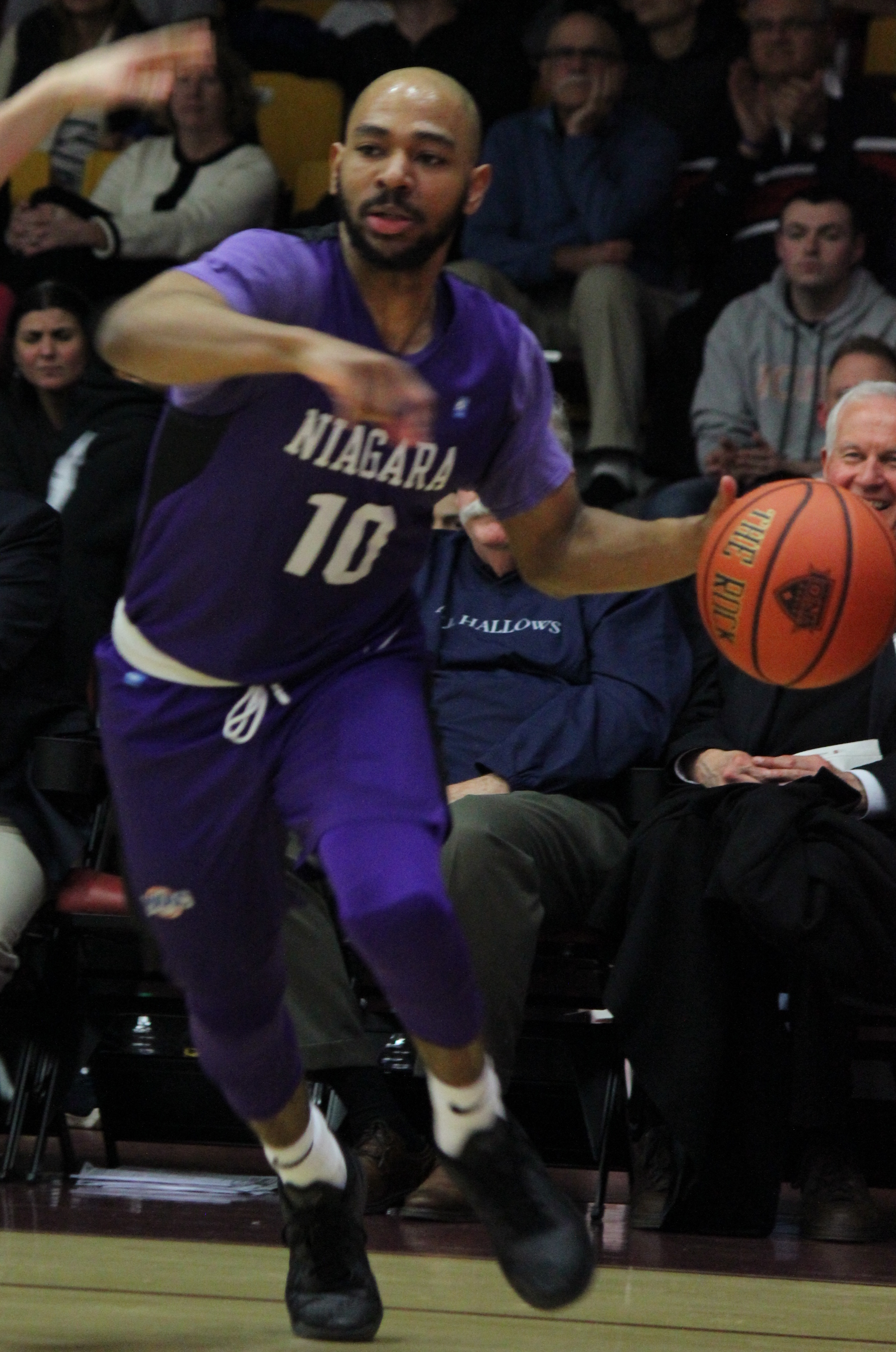
- Dukes with Niagara in 2018

No. 5 – Keçiören Belediyesi Bağlumspor
- Position: Point guard
- League: TBL

Personal information
- Born: May 17, 1995 (age 31) Hartford, Connecticut, U.S.
- Listed height: 6 ft 0 in (1.83 m)
- Listed weight: 180 lb (82 kg)

Career information
- High school: Capital Preparatory Magnet School (Hartford, Connecticut)
- College: USC (2013–2015); Niagara (2016–2018)
- NBA draft: 2018: undrafted
- Playing career: 2018–present

Career history
- 2018: Irkut
- 2019: Universitet Yugra Surgut
- 2019: Hamburg Towers
- 2019–2020: Legia Warszawa
- 2020–2021: Samsunspor
- 2021–2022: Balkan
- 2022–2023: Best Balıkesir
- 2023–2024: Orléans Loiret
- 2024: Esenler Erokspor
- 2024–2025: Paks Atomerőmű
- 2026: Montréal Toundra
- 2026: Prishtina
- 2026: Kocaeli BB Kağıtspor
- 2026–present: Keçiören Bağlum Spor

Career highlights
- AP Honorable Mention All-American (2018); MAAC Co-Player of the Year (2018); First-team All-MAAC (2018)

Kahlil Quinton Dukes (born May 17, 1995) is an American professional basketball player for Keçiören Belediyesi Bağlumspor of the Türkiye Basketbol Ligi (TBL). He played college basketball for the University of Southern California (USC) and Niagara University and was named the 2018 Metro Atlantic Athletic Conference Co-Player of the Year.

== College career ==
A 6 ft 0 in (1.83 m) point guard and Hartford, Connecticut native, Dukes attended Capital Prep Magnet School and scored 2,238 points for his high school career. He was recruited to USC by coach Kevin O'Neill, but O'Neill was fired prior to Dukes arriving to campus. Dukes played sparingly for new coach Andy Enfield and ultimately decided to transfer to Niagara due to family and AAU connections with Chris Casey's coaching staff. Per NCAA transfer rules, Dukes sat out the 2015–16 season.

As a redshirt junior, Dukes immediately entered the starting lineup for the Purple Eagles. He averaged 15.5 points and 4.1 assists per game on the season. As a senior, Dukes raised his scoring average to 21 points per game and led the Purple Eagles to a 12–6 Metro Atlantic Athletic Conference (MAAC) record. At the close of the 2017–18 season, was named the MAAC co-Player of the Year with Canisuius' Jermaine Crumpton. The duo were also named honorable mention All-Americans by the Associated Press.

== Professional career ==
Following the close of his college career, Dukes signed with BC Irkut Irkutsk of the Russian Basketball Super League 1. He averaged 22.5 points, 4.1 assists and 3.1 rebounds per game in 15 games before the team was disbanded in late December 2018. In January 2019, Dukes joined Universitet Yugra Surgut for the remainder of the 2018–19 season. He averaged 25.8 points, 6.4 assists, and 4.1 rebounds per game in 16 games.

In July 2019, Dukes signed with Hamburg Towers of the Basketball Bundesliga. He left the team after only two games and joined Legia Warszawa in Poland in December 2019. He averaged 17.1 points, 3.4 assists, and 1.6 rebounds per game in 10 games.

On July 31, 2020, Dukes signed with Samsunspor of the Turkish Basketball First League. He averaged 18.7 points, 4.2 assists, and 2.8 rebounds per game in 39 games.

On August 29, 2021, Dukes signed with BC Balkan Botevgrad of the Bulgarian National Basketball League. His final game for Balkan occurred on January 31, 2022. He averaged 11.2 points in 12 NBL games and 8.8 points in five Balkan League games.

On February 15, 2022, Dukes signed with Best Balıkesir of the Turkish Basketball First League. He averaged 19.8 points, 8.4 assists, and 2.4 rebounds per game in 10 games to finish the 2021–22 season. He returned to Best Balıkesir for the 2022–23 season and averaged 17.0 points, 5.6 assists, and 3.0 rebounds per game in 29 games.

For the 2023–24 season, Dukes joined Orléans Loiret Basket of the LNB Pro B. He averaged 11.9 points, 3.6 assists, and 1.6 rebounds in 18 games before leaving the team in February 2024. He subsequently joined Esenler Erokspor in Turkey for the remainder of the season, averaging 20.1 points, 4.5 assists, and 3.5 rebounds in 12 games.

In July 2024, Dukes signed with Atomerőmű SE of the Nemzeti Bajnokság I/A for the 2024–25 season.
