= List of 2003–04 NBA season transactions =

This is a detailed list of transactions during the 2003-04 NBA season.

== Retirements ==
Date	Name	Team(s) played (years)	Age	Notes	Ref.
August 7	Steve Kerr	Phoenix Suns (1988–1989); Cleveland Cavaliers (1989–1992); Orlando Magic (1992–1993); Chicago Bulls (1993–1998); San Antonio Spurs (1999–2001, 2002–2003); Portland Trail Blazers (2001–2002)	37	Was hired by TNT as a commentator	
September 12	Danny Manning	Los Angeles Clippers (1988–1994); Atlanta Hawks (1994); Phoenix Suns (1994–1999); Milwaukee Bucks (1999–2000); Utah Jazz (2000–2001); Dallas Mavericks (2001–2002); Detroit Pistons (2003)	37	Attempted a comeback	
October 25	Michael Dickerson	Houston Rockets (1999); Vancouver/Memphis Grizzlies (1999–2003)	28	Retired due to a groin injury, among others; attempted a comeback in 2008	

== Draft ==
=== First round ===
Pick	Player	Date signed	Team	School/club team
1	LeBron James	July 3	Cleveland Cavaliers	St. Vincent–St. Mary High School (Akron, Ohio)
2	Darko Miličić	September 12	Detroit Pistons	Hemofarm (Serbia)
3	Carmelo Anthony	July 17	Denver Nuggets	Syracuse (Fr.)
4	Chris Bosh	July 7	Toronto Raptors	Georgia Tech (Fr.)
5	Dwyane Wade	July 1	Miami Heat	Marquette (Jr.)
6	Chris Kaman	July 12	Los Angeles Clippers	Central Michigan (Jr.)
7	Kirk Hinrich	July 14	Chicago Bulls	Kansas (Sr.)
8	T. J. Ford	July 2	Milwaukee Bucks	Texas (So.)
9	Michael Sweetney	July 7	New York Knicks	Georgetown (Jr.)
10	Jarvis Hayes	August 20	Washington Wizards	Georgia (Sr.)
11	Mickaël Piétrus	July 7	Golden State Warriors	Pau-Orthez (France)
12	Nick Collison	July 7	Seattle SuperSonics	Kansas (Sr.)
13	Marcus Banks	July 10	Boston Celtics	UNLV (Sr.)
14	Luke Ridnour	July 8	Seattle SuperSonics	Oregon (Jr.)
15	Reece Gaines	July 18	Boston Celtics	Prentiss HS (Prentiss, MS)
16	Troy Bell	July 5	Memphis Grizzlies	Boston College (Sr.)
17	Žarko Čabarkapa	July 1	Phoenix Suns	Budućnost Podgorica (Montenegro)
18	David West	July 8	New Orleans Hornets	Xavier (Sr.)
19	Sasha Pavlović	July 23	Utah Jazz	Budućnost Podgorica (Montenegro)
20	Dahntay Jones	July 5	Memphis Grizzlies	Duke (Sr.)
21	Boris Diaw	July 10	Atlanta Hawks	Pau-Orthez (France)
22	Zoran Planinić	July 11	New Jersey Nets	Cibona Zagreb (Croatia)
23	Travis Outlaw	July 14	Portland Trail Blazers	Starkville High School (Starkville, Mississippi)
24	Brian Cook	July 5	Los Angeles Lakers	Illinois (Sr.)
25	Carlos Delfino		Detroit Pistons	Skipper Bologna (Italy)
26	Ndudi Ebi	July 5	Minnesota Timberwolves	Westbury Christian High School (Houston, Texas)
27	Kendrick Perkins	July 9	Boston Celtics	Ozen HS (Beaumont, TX)
28	Leandro Barbosa	July 16	Phoenix Suns	Bauru Tilibra (Brazil)
29	Josh Howard	July 3	Dallas Mavericks	Wake Forest (So.)

=== Second round ===
Pick	Player	Date signed	Team	School/club team
30	Maciej Lampe	August 13	New York Knicks	Complutense University of Madrid (Spain)
31	Jason Kapono	July 30	Cleveland Cavaliers	UCLA (Sr.)
32	Luke Walton	July 8	Los Angeles Lakers	UCLA (Sr.)
33	Jerome Beasley	September 4	Miami Heat	North Dakota (Sr.)
34	Sofoklis Schortsanitis		Los Angeles Clippers	Iraklis BC (Greece)
35	Szymon Szewczyk		Milwaukee Bucks	Germany
36	Mario Austin		Chicago Bulls	Miss State (Jr.)
37	Travis Hansen	July 10	Atlanta Hawks	BYU (Sr.)
38	Chris Duhon	October 4	Chicago Bulls	Duke (Sr.)
39	Slavko Vraneš	July 16	New York Knicks	Budućnost Podgorica (Montenegro)
40	Justin Reed	August 27	Boston Celtics	Ole Miss (Sr.)
41	Willie Green	August 8	Philadelphia 76ers	Detroit (Sr.)
42	Zaza Pachulia	July 24	Orlando Magic	Ülkerspor (Turkey)
43	Keith Bogans	July 25	Orlando Magic	Kentucky (Sr.)
44	Tim Pickett	August 3	New Orleans Hornets	Florida State (Sr.)
45	Bernard Robinson	July 28	Charlotte Bobcats	Michigan (Sr.)
46	Ha Seung-Jin	December 26	Portland Trail Blazers	Yonsei University (South Korea)
47	Pape Sow	October 4	Toronto Raptors	Cal State Fullerton (Sr.)
48	Ricky Minard	July 7	Sacramento Kings	Morehead State (Sr.)
49	Sergei Lishouk		Memphis Grizzlies	Khimik Yuzhny (Ukraine)
50	Vassilis Spanoulis		Houston Rockets	Maroussi B.C. (Greece)
51	Kyle Korver	August 8	Philadelphia 76ers	Creighton (Sr.)
52	Romain Sato	July 15	San Antonio Spurs	Xavier (Sr.)
53	Matt Freije	August 26	Miami Heat	Vanderbilt (Sr.)
54	Rickey Paulding		Detroit Pistons	Missouri (Sr.)
55	Luis Flores	September 14	Golden State Warriors	Manhattan (Sr.)
56	Brandon Hunter	July 28	Boston Celtics	Ohio (Sr.)
57	Sergei Karaulov		San Antonio Spurs	Skha Jakutia Yakutsk
58	Blake Stepp	October 4	Minnesota Timberwolves	Gonzaga (Sr.)

=== Previous years' draftees ===
Draft	Pick	Player	Date signed	Team	Previous team
2002	50	Darius Songaila	July 1	Sacramento Kings	CSKA Moscow (Russia)
