= Nikola Lepojević =

Serbian basketball player

No. 5 – Universitet Yugra
- Position: Shooting guard / point guard
- League: Russian Super League

Personal information
- Born: 20 August 1982 (age 44) Kraljevo, SFR Yugoslavia
- Listed height: 1.95 m (6 ft 5 in)
- Listed weight: 93 kg (205 lb)

Career information
- NBA draft: 2004: undrafted
- Playing career: 2000–present

Career history
- 2000–2002: Sloga
- 2002–2004: OKK Beograd
- 2004–2005: Crvena zvezda
- 2005–2007: AEL Larissas
- 2007–2008: Khimik
- 2008: Poplak Świecie
- 2008–2009: Universitet Yugra Surgut
- 2009–2010: OKK Beograd
- 2010: Apollon Limassol
- 2010: Politekhnika-Halychyna
- 2010–2011: Universitet Yugra Surgut
- 2011–2012: Ural Yekaterinburg
- 2013: Hamyari Shahrdari Zanjan
- 2013–2020: Universitet Yugra Surgut

Career highlights
- 3× Russian Super League 1 MVP (2012, 2017, 2018); 7× Russian Super League 1 Top Scorer (2011, 2012, 2014–2018)

Nikola Lepojević (Serbian Cyrillic: Никола Лепојевић; born 20 August 1982) is a Serbian professional basketball player for Universitet Yugra Surgut.

== Professional career ==
A shooting guard and point guard, Lepojević played for Sloga, OKK Beograd, Crvena zvezda, AEL Larissas, Khimik, Poplak Świecie, Universitet Yugra Surgut, Apollon Limassol, Politekhnika-Halychyna, Ural Yekaterinburg, and Hamyari Shahrdari Zanjan.

== National team career ==
Lepojević was a member of the Yugoslavia B-national team at the 2001 Mediterranean Games in Tunis, Tunisia.

== Career achievements ==
- Russian Basketball Super League 1 champion: 2 (with Ural Yekaterinburg: 2011–12; with Universitet Yugra Surgut: 2016–17)
