= Ledlum =

Ledlum is a surname. Notable people with the surname include:

- Chris Ledlum (born 2001), American basketball player
- Edward Ledlum (born 1999), Liberian footballer
