= Nikita Morgunov =

Russian basketball player

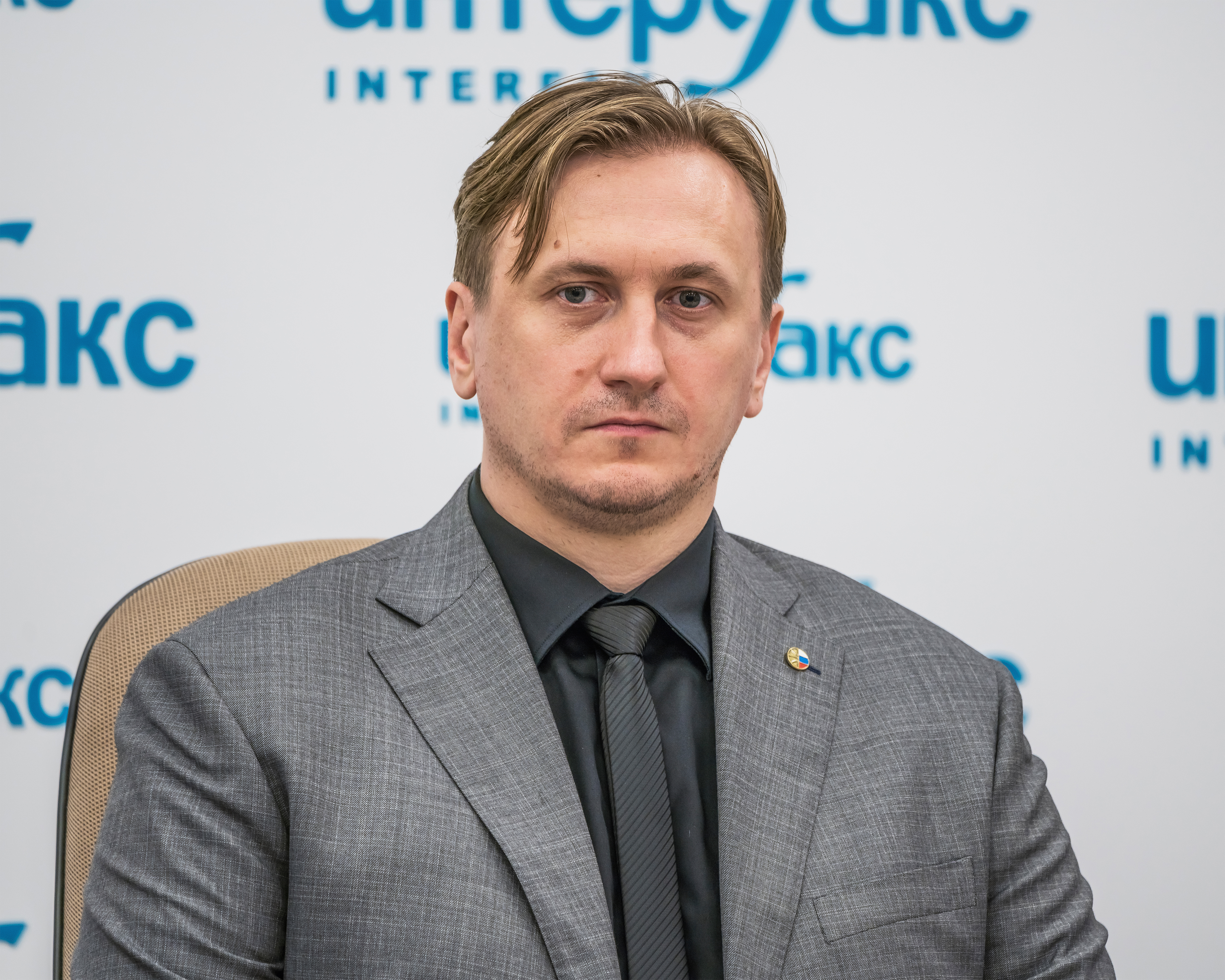

Personal information
- Born: June 29, 1975 (age 51) Novokuznetsk, Russian SFSR, Soviet Union
- Listed height: 2.11 m (6 ft 11 in)
- Listed weight: 125 kg (276 lb)

Career information
- NBA draft: 1997: undrafted
- Playing career: 1990–2015
- Position: Power forward / center

Career history
- 1990–1993: Dynamo Stavropol
- 1993–1997: CSKA Moscow
- 1997–1999: Atletas Kaunas
- 1999–2000: CSKA Moscow
- 2000–2002: Avtodor Saratov
- 2003–2004: Dynamo Moscow
- 2003–2004: Makedonikos
- 2004–2007: Dinamo Moscow Region
- 2007–2008: Triumph Lyubertsy
- 2008–2009: Lokomotiv Rostov
- 2009–2010: Lokomotiv Kuban
- 2010–2011: Universitet Yugra Surgut
- 2012–2013: Dynamo Moscow
- 2013–2014: Spartak Primorye
- 2014–2015: Dynamo Moscow

Career highlights
- 4× Russian League champion (1994–1997)
Medals
Men's basketball
Representing Russia
FIBA World Cup
Silver medal – second place	1998 Greece
FIBA EuroBasket
Gold medal – first place	2007 Spain

Nikita Leonidovich Morgunov (Russian: Никита Леонидович Моргунов; born June 29, 1975) is a Russian former professional basketball player and current commentator for the basketball games. Standing at 2.11 m (6 ft 11 in), he played both the power forward and center positions. He represented the Russian national basketball team.

== Professional career ==
Some of the clubs that Morgunov played with during his pro career included: CSKA Moscow (1995–97, 2000–02), Atletas Kaunas in Lithuania (1997–99), Avtodor Saratov (2002), Dynamo Moscow (2002–03, 2012–13), Dinamo Moscow Region (2004–07), Khimki (2007–08), Lokomotiv Kuban (2008–10), and Universitet Yugra Surgut (2010–11) in Russia, and Makedonikos Kozani in Greece (2003–04).

He was also under contract with the NBA team the Portland Trail Blazers, for three separate periods (January 26 - April 24, 1999; October 7, 1999 - April 14, 2000, and October 11–28, 2000), but he did not play in any regular season NBA games for the team.

On December 16, 2014, he signed with Dynamo Moscow of the Russian Super League.

== National team career ==
Morgunov was also a member of the senior men's Russian national team that won the gold medal at the FIBA EuroBasket 2007. He also played at the 2000 Summer Olympic Games, and he won a silver medal at the 1998 FIBA World Championship.
