= Grigory Motovilov =

Russian basketball player

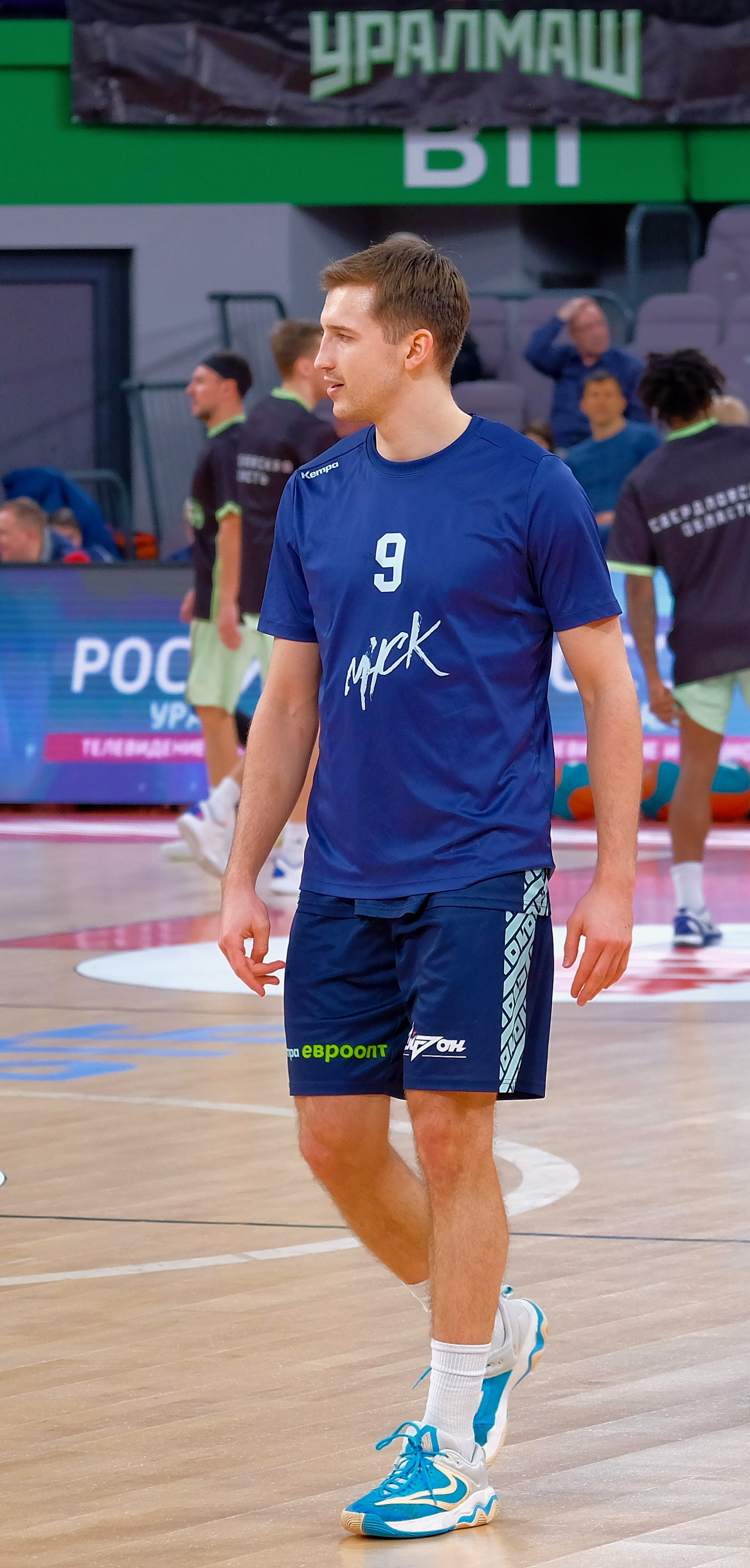

No. 9 – Avtodor Saratov
- Position: Point guard / shooting guard
- League: VTB United League

Personal information
- Born: February 7, 1998 (age 28) Moscow, Russia
- Listed height: 1.96 m (6 ft 5 in)
- Listed weight: 79 kg (174 lb)

Career information
- Playing career: 2014–present

Career history
- 2014–2018: Zenit Saint Petersburg
- 2018–2019: BC Spartak Primorye
- 2019–2021: Lokomotiv Kuban
- 2021: Temp-SUMZ-UGMK Revda
- 2021–2022: BC Izhevsk
- 2022–2023: Enisey
- 2023–2024: BC Minsk
- 2024–2025: BC Astana
- 2025–present: Avtodor Saratov

Grigory Motovilov (born February 7, 1998) is a Russian professional basketball player for Avtodor Saratov of the VTB United League. He played for Lokomotiv Kuban of the VTB United League and the EuroCup, as well as the Russian national basketball team Motovilov signed with BC Izhevsk of the Russian Basketball Super League 1 on December 17, 2021.

== National team career ==
Motovilov was a member of the Russian junior national teams. With Russia's junior national teams, he played at the 2013 FIBA Europe Under-16 Championship, the FIBA U18 European Championship, and the 2017 FIBA U20 European Championship where he averaged 18.4 points, 3 points and 2.8 rebounds.

Motovilov is a member of the senior Russian national basketball team, with Russia's senior men team, he played at the 2019 FIBA Basketball World Cup where he averaged 4.6 points, 1 rebounds and 1.2 assists.
