= Sergei Karaulov =

Uzbekistani-Russian basketball player (born 1982)

Personal information
- Born: 15 April 1982 (age 44) Guliston, Uzbek SSR, Soviet Union
- Listed height: 2.15 m (7 ft 1 in)
- Listed weight: 115 kg (254 lb)

Career information
- NBA draft: 2004: 2nd round, 57th overall pick
- Drafted by: San Antonio Spurs
- Playing career: 2001–2021
- Position: Center

Career history
- 2001–2002: BCT Otrar Alma Ata
- 2002–2004: Skha Jakutia Yakutsk
- 2004–2006: Khimki
- 2006–2007: Samara
- 2007–2008: Lokomotiv Rostov
- 2008–2009: Nizhny Novgorod
- 2009–2011: Krasnye Krylia Samara
- 2011–2012: Spartak Primorye
- 2012–2013: Triumph Lyubertsy
- 2013–2014: Ruskon-Mordovia Saransk
- 2014–2015: Ural Yekaterinburg
- 2015–2019: Temp-SUMZ-UGMK Revda
- 2019–2020: Vostok-65
- 2020–2021: Uralmash Ekaterinburg
- Stats at Basketball Reference

Sergei (Sergey) Karaulov (Russian: Серге́й Николаевич Караулов; born 15 April 1982) is an Uzbekistani-Russian former professional basketball player who last played for Uralmash Ekaterinburg of the Superleague 1.

== Professional career ==
Karaulov began his professional career in 2001, playing in the Russian Basketball League system. Some of the clubs that Karaulov played for during his career include: Krasnye Krylia, Triumph Lybuertsy, Lokomotiv Rostov, Spartak Primorye, Nizhny Novgorod, Khimki and Temp-SUMZ-UGMK Revda.

=== NBA Draft ===
Karaulov was drafted by the San Antonio Spurs in the second round of the 2004 NBA draft with the 57th overall pick.

== National team career ==
Having dual nationality, Karaulov had the option of representing either Uzbekistan or Russia in international competitions. He represented Uzbekistan at the 2001 ABC Championship, and Russia at the 2007 Summer Universiade.
