= BC Zenit Saint Petersburg =

Russian professional basketball team

Zenit Saint Petersburg
- Leagues: VTB United League
- Founded: 2014; 12 years ago
- History: List: BC Dynamo Moscow Region (2003–2007) BC Triumph Lyubertsy (2007–2014) BC Zenit Saint Petersburg (2014–present)
- Arena: KSK Arena
- Capacity: 7,120
- Location: Saint Petersburg, Russia
- Main sponsor: Gazprom
- President: Alexander Medvedev
- General manager: Sani Bečirovič (sporting director)
- Head coach: Duško Ivanović
- Team captain: Trent Frazier
- Ownership: Gazprom
- Championships: 1 VTB United League; 2 VTB League Supercup; 1 Russian Cup
- Website: bc-zenit.com
Home	Away

BC Zenit Saint Petersburg (Russian: БК Зенит Санкт Петербург), formerly known as BC Dynamo Moscow Region (2003–2007) and BC Triumph Lyubertsy (2007–2014), is a Russian professional basketball team that is located in Saint Petersburg, Russia, since 2014. The club competes domestically in the VTB United League.

Their home court is Sibur Arena. The club is sponsored by Gazprom. Since the team moved to Saint Petersburg in 2014, the team is a part of the multi-sports club Zenit, of which the football club FC Zenit Saint Petersburg, is also a part. Alexander Tserkovny is a general manager of the club since July 16, 2018.

== History ==
=== Dynamo Moscow ===
The club was originally established in 2003, under the name BC Dynamo Moscow Region, and registered into the Russian Superleague A.

=== Triumph Lyubertsy ===
In 2007, the basketball club of Dynamo Moscow Region disbanded and became the newly reformed club of BC Triumph Lyubertsy Moscow Region. Triumph Lyubertsy retained all the records of the Dynamo Moscow Region club, through the acquisition of the club's rights. In the 2013–14 season, Triumph reached the final of the EuroChallenge, in which it lost to Reggio Emilia by a score of 65–79.

=== Zenit ===
==== 2014-2019 ====
In July 2014, the club announced it was relocating from Lyubertsy to Saint Petersburg, and was changing its name to BC Zenit Saint Petersburg. The club retained the rights of BC Triumph Lyubertsy, and also its place in both the VTB United League and the EuroCup. Meanwhile, the club tried to retain a second club in Lyubertsy, that would compete in the Russian Super League 1. As a result, the basketball club became a section of the Zenit sports club, which already contained Zenit FC, a football club.

The team finished fifth in the 2014–15 season, but was eliminated in the quarter-finals. In 2016, Zenit moved from the Sibur Arena to the Yubileyni Arena. In the following four seasons, Zenit qualified for the semi-finals every time, but never reached the league finals.

On 27 June 2019, EuroLeague Basketball awarded Zenit a wild card for the 2019–20 EuroLeague. This would mark Zenit's debut in the highest European tier.

==== 2020-present ====
In early 2022, in light of the 2022 Russian invasion of Ukraine, American-Puerto Rican Shabazz Napier left the team. Also leaving the team were Americans Billy Baron, Alex Poythress, Conner Frankamp, Tyson Carter, Jordan Mickey, and Jordan Loyd, as well as Lithuanians Arturas Gudaitis and Mindaugas Kuzminskas, and Polish player Mateusz Ponitka.

On February 28, 2022, EuroLeague Basketball suspended the team because of the 2022 Russian invasion of Ukraine.

On June 5, 2022 BC Zenit has become VTB United League champion beating CSKA Moscow in 7 games.

== Arenas ==
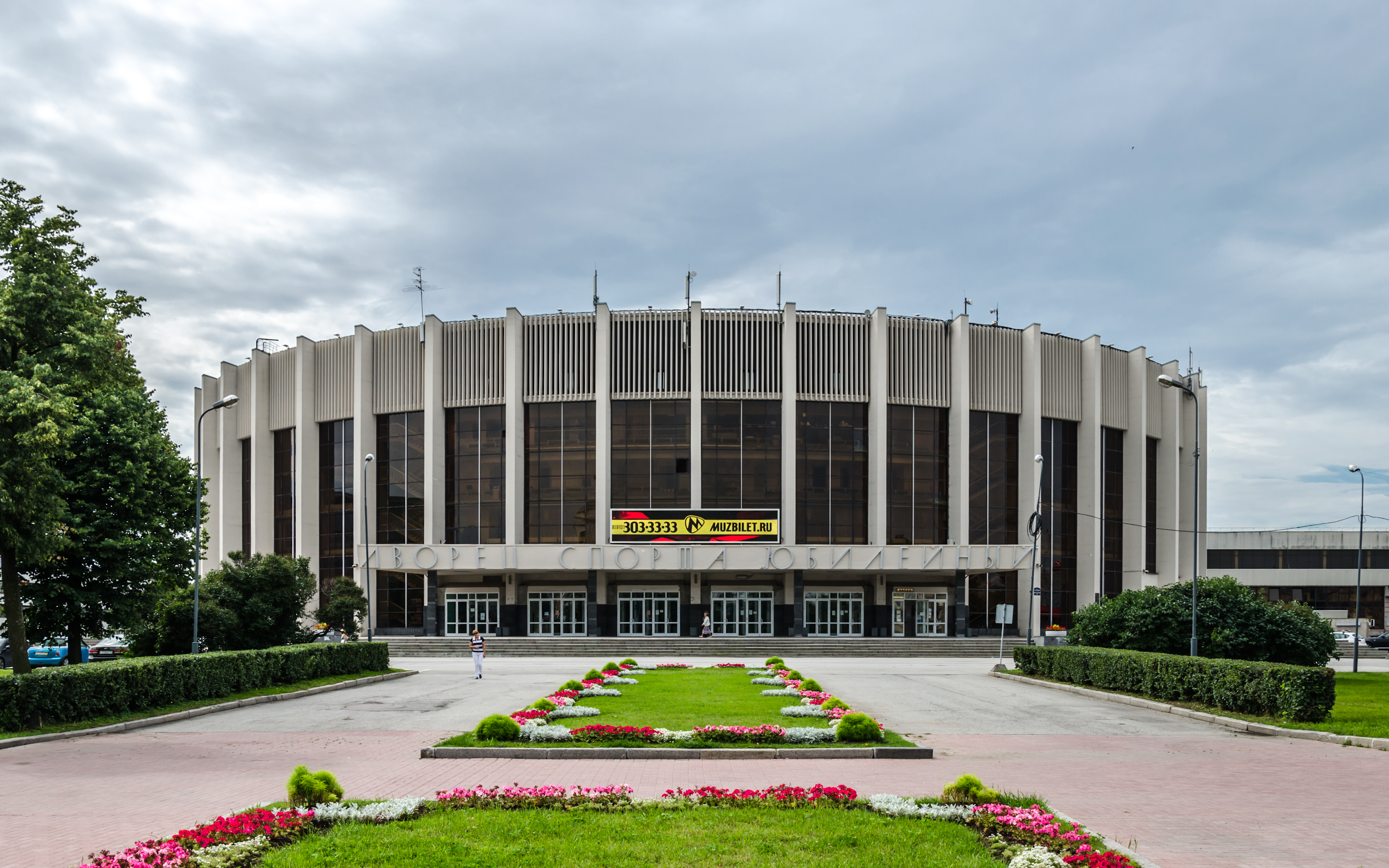
The Yubileyny Sports Palace

When the club moved to St. Petersburg, they first played their home games at the 7,120 seat Sibur Arena. They then moved to the newly renovated 7,000 seat Yubileyni Arena. When the club was previously based in Lyubertsy, they played their home games at the 4,000 seat Triumph Sports Palace arena.

Arenas
Arena	City	Capacity	Tenure
Triumph Sports Palace	Lyubertsy	4,000	2003–2014
KSK Arena	Saint Petersburg	7,120	2014–present
Yubileyny Sports Palace	Saint Petersburg	7,000	2016–present

== Honours ==
=== Domestic competitions ===
- Russian Professional Basketball Championship / VTB United League
  - Winners (1): 2021–22
- VTB United League Supercup
  - Winners (2): 2022, 2023
- Russian Cup
  - Winners (1): 2024

=== European competitions ===
- FIBA Europe Conference North
  - Winners (2): 2004, 2005
- FIBA EuroCup Challenge
  - Runner-up (1): 2005
- FIBA EuroChallenge
  - Runner-up (1): 2014
  - Third place (2): 2009, 2012

=== Other competitions ===
- Vladimir Kondrashin and Alexander Belov Tournament
  - Winners (2): 2021, 2022.

== Season by season ==
Season	Tier	League	Pos.	Russian Cup	European competitions	
Dynamo Moscow Region
2003–04	1	Superliga A	6th			
2004–05	1	Superliga A	7th			
2005–06	1	Superliga A	6th			
2006–07	1	Superliga A	6th			
Triumph Lyubertsy
2007–08	1	Superliga A	4th		2 ULEB Cup	RS
2008–09	1	Superliga A	5th		3 EuroChallenge	3rd
2009–10	1	Superliga А	6th	Quarterfinalist	2 Eurocup	RS
2010–11	1	PBL	10th		3 EuroChallenge	QR
2011–12	1	PBL	3rd	Quarterfinalist	3 EuroChallenge	3rd
2012–13	1	PBL	5th		2 Eurocup	EF
2013–14	1	United League	5th	Quarterfinalist	3 EuroChallenge	RU
Zenit Saint Petersburg
2014–15	1	United League	5th	Second qualifying round	2 Eurocup	EF
2015–16	1	United League	3rd	Runner-up	2 Eurocup	EF
2016–17	1	United League	3rd		2 EuroCup	QF
2017–18	1	United League	3rd		2 EuroCup	QF
2018–19	1	United League	4th	First round	2 EuroCup	T16
2019–20	1	United League	6th	—	1 EuroLeague	18th place
2020–21	1	United League	3rd		1 EuroLeague	QF
2021–22	1	United League	1st	Supercup Runner-up	1 EuroLeague	SP
2022–23	1	United League	4th			
2023–24	1	United League	3rd			
2024–25	1	United League	2nd			

== Players ==
=== Current roster ===
Note: Flags indicate national team eligibility at FIBA-sanctioned events. Players may hold other non-FIBA nationalities not displayed.

Zenit Saint Petersburg roster
Players
Coaches

Pos.	No.	Nat.	Name	Ht.	Wt.	Age
SG	00	(United States)	Pierre-Louis, Nate	1.93 m (6 ft 4 in)	93 kg (205 lb)	27 – 23 December 1998
SG	0	(Puerto Rico)	Howard, Markus	1.80 m (5 ft 11 in)	79 kg (174 lb)	27 – 3 March 1999
G	1	(Russia)	Shcherbenev, Aleksander (injured)	1.91 m (6 ft 3 in)	83 kg (183 lb)	26 – 3 October 2000
SF	4	(United States)	Ledlum, Chris	1.98 m (6 ft 6 in)	110 kg (243 lb)	25 – 19 February 2001
F	7	(Russia)	Karasev, Sergey (C)	2.01 m (6 ft 7 in)	95 kg (209 lb)	33 – 26 October 1993
SG	8	(Russia)	Kulagin, Dmitry	1.97 m (6 ft 6 in)	96 kg (212 lb)	34 – 1 July 1992
G/F	9	(Russia)	Evstatev, Egor	2.00 m (6 ft 7 in)	80 kg (176 lb)	20 – 1 August 2006
C	10	(Russia)	Martiuk, Andrey	2.11 m (6 ft 11 in)	105 kg (231 lb)	26 – 10 June 2000
G	11	(Nigeria)	Iroegbu, Ike	1.88 m (6 ft 2 in)	86 kg (190 lb)	31 – 14 March 1995
SF	12	(Russia)	Zhbanov, Georgy	1.97 m (6 ft 6 in)	95 kg (209 lb)	29 – 10 October 1997
F	21	(United States)	Roberson, André	2.01 m (6 ft 7 in)	95 kg (209 lb)	34 – 4 December 1991
F/C	22	(Ivory Coast)	Poythress, Alex	2.05 m (6 ft 9 in)	108 kg (238 lb)	33 – 6 September 1993
PG	23	(Russia)	Chikishev, Dmitry	1.75 m (5 ft 9 in)	74 kg (163 lb)	19 – 20 April 2007
SF	25	(Russia)	Antipov, Artem	2.01 m (6 ft 7 in)	95 kg (209 lb)	22 – 18 September 2004
C	33	(Russia)	Vorontsevich, Andrey	2.07 m (6 ft 9 in)	107 kg (236 lb)	39 – 17 July 1987
SG	35	(Russia)	Emchenko, Vladislav	1.93 m (6 ft 4 in)	91 kg (201 lb)	27 – 13 October 1999
G	47	(Russia)	Suikonen, Anton	1.80 m (5 ft 11 in)	63 kg (139 lb)	17 – 19 January 2009
F/C	77	(Russia)	Zemskii, Pavel	2.03 m (6 ft 8 in)	92 kg (203 lb)	22 – 25 June 2004

Head coach

- (Montenegro) Duško Ivanović

Assistant coach(es)

- (Spain) Arturo Alvarez
- (Montenegro) Blagota Sekulić
- (Russia) Maxim Uchaykin

Team manager

- (Russia) Vyacheslav Belgesov

Legend

- (C) Team captain
- Injured

- Roster
Updated: November 21, 2026

=== Depth chart ===
Pos.	Starting 5	Bench 1	Bench 2	Bench 3	Inactive
C	Andrey Martiuk	Alex Poythress		Andrey Vorontsevich
PF	Georgy Zhbanov	André Roberson		Pavel Zemskii
SF	Chris Ledlum	Sergey Karasev	Egor Evstatev	Artem Antipov
SG	Vladislav Emchenko	Markus Howard	Nate Pierre-Louis	Dmitry Kulagin
PG	Ike Iroegbu	Dmitriy Chikishev		Anton Suikonen	Aleksander Shcherbenev (injured)

=== Notable players ===
Note: Flags indicate national team eligibility at FIBA-sanctioned events. Players may hold other non-FIBA nationalities not displayed.

Criteria

To appear in this section a player must have either:

- Set a club record or won an individual award while at the club
- Played at least one official international match for their national team at any time
- Played at least one official NBA match at any time.

- (Australia) Luke Nevill
- (Bosnia and Herzegovina) J. R. Bremer
- (Canada) Kyle Landry
- (Canada) Kevin Pangos
- (Croatia) Luka Šamanić
- (Israel) Gal Mekel
- (Israel) Yuval Naimi
- (Latvia) Jānis Timma
- (Lithuania) Giedrius Gustas
- (North Macedonia) Nenad Dimitrijević
- (Puerto Rico) Trent Frazier
- (Puerto Rico) Markus Howard
- (Russia) Egor Vyaltsev
- (Russia) Andrey Vorontsevich
- (Russia) Sergey Karasev
- (Russia) Fedor Dmitriev
- (Russia) Andrey Desyatnikov
- (Russia) Nikita Morgunov
- (Russia) Fedor Likholitov
- (Russia) Dmitry Kulagin
- (Russia) Mikhail Kulagin
- (Russia) Sergei Karaulov
- (Russia) Grigory Motovilov
- (Russia) Vladislav Trushkin
- (Russia) Anton Ponkrashov
- (Russia) Nikita Shabalkin
- (Russia) Evgeny Valiev
- (Russia) Andrey Zubkov
- (Russia) Vasily Karasev
- (Russia) Pavel Antipov
- (Serbia) Nikola Vasić
- (Serbia) Ivan Zoroski
- (Serbia) Nenad Krstić
- (Serbia) Stefan Marković
- (Serbia) Ognjen Aškrabić
- (Slovenia) Uroš Slokar
- (Turkey) Kerem Tunçeri
- (United States) Alan Anderson
- (United States) Davon Jefferson
- (United States) Johnny Juzang
- (United States) Jordan Loyd
- (United States) Chris Ledlum
- (United States) Nate Mason
- (United States) Paul Miller
- (United States) Xavier Moon
- (United States) Malik Newman
- (United States) Nate Pierre-Louis
- (United States) Levi Randolph
- (United States) André Roberson
- (United States) Noah Vonleh

== Head coaches ==
Head coaches
Name	Nationality	Tenure	Trophies
Evgeny Kovalenko	(Russia)	2003—2005	
Aleksandr Vasin	(Russia)	2005	
Rūtenis Paulauskas	(Lithuania)	2005—2007	
Dmitry Shakulin	(Russia)	2007	
Stanislav Yeryomin	(Russia)	2007—2010	
Valdemaras Chomičius	(Lithuania)	2010–2012	
Vasily Karasev	(Russia)	2012–2018	
Joan Plaza	(Spain)	2018–2020	
Xavi Pascual	(Spain)	2020–2025	
Aleksander Sekulić	(Slovenia)	2025–2026	
Dejan Radonjić	(Montenegro)	2026	
Rostislav Vergun	(Belarus)	2026	
Duško Ivanović	(Montenegro)	2026–present	
