= Lionel Chalmers =

American basketball player (born 1980)

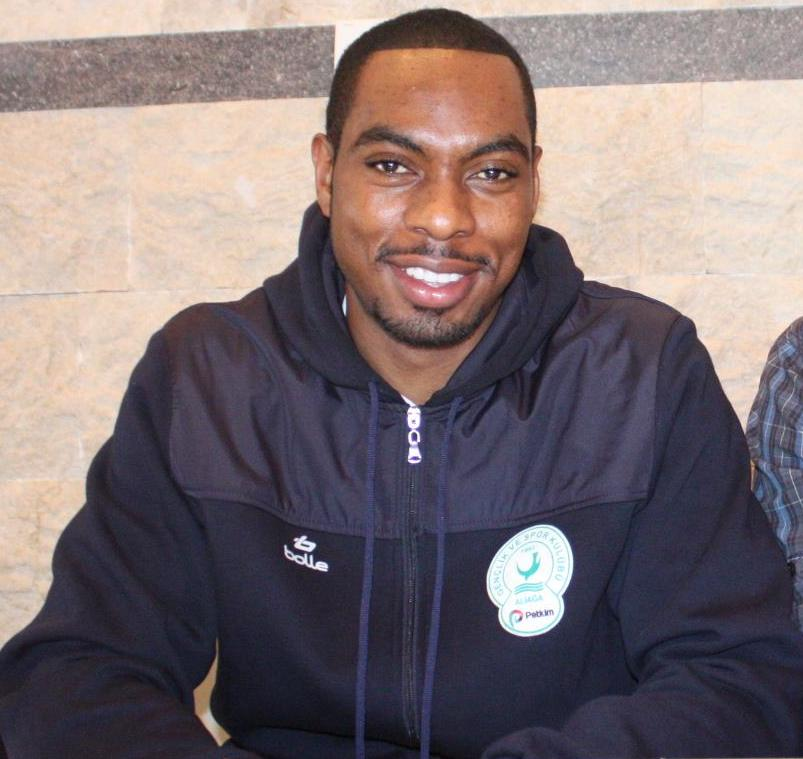

Orlando Magic
- Title: Assistant coach
- League: NBA

Personal information
- Born: November 10, 1980 (age 46) Albany, New York, U.S.
- Listed height: 6 ft 0 in (1.83 m)
- Listed weight: 180 lb (82 kg)

Career information
- High school: Albany (Albany, New York)
- College: Xavier (2000–2004)
- NBA draft: 2004: 2nd round, 33rd overall pick
- Drafted by: Los Angeles Clippers
- Playing career: 2004–2015
- Position: Point guard
- Number: 0

Career history

Playing
- 2004–2005: Los Angeles Clippers
- 2005–2006: AEK Athens
- 2006: TAU Cerámica
- 2006–2007: Dinamo Sassari
- 2007: Basket CAI Zaragoza
- 2007–2008: Benetton Treviso
- 2008–2009: Universitet Yugra Surgut
- 2009–2010: Enisey Krasnoyarsk
- 2010–2012: Lokomotiv Kuban
- 2012–2013: Aliağa Petkim
- 2013–2014: Levski Sofia
- 2014–2015: Chalons-Reims
- 2015: Gediz Üniversitesi

Career highlights
- NBL champion (2014)
- Stats at NBA.com
- Stats at Basketball Reference

Lionel Chalmers Jr. (born November 10, 1980) is an American former professional basketball player who currently works as an assistant coach for the Orlando Magic of the National Basketball Association (NBA). He is 6 ft 0 in (1.83 m) in height and played at the point guard position.

== Amateur career ==
Chalmers played his first three years of high school basketball at Notre Dame-Bishop Gibbons in Schenectady, New York. He then transferred to Albany High School for his senior year.

Chalmers attended Xavier University, where he played college basketball for four years as an undergraduate and later as a graduate student. As a senior, he led Xavier to the Elite Eight round of the NCAA Tournament. He was inducted into the Xavier University Athletic Hall of Fame in 2015.

== Professional career ==
Chalmers was drafted by the Los Angeles Clippers in the second round of the 2004 NBA draft with the 33rd overall pick. He played in 34 games in the 2004–05 season with the Clippers, averaging 3.1 points per game and 1.4 assists per game in 12.0 minutes per game. He was traded to the Minnesota Timberwolves on August 20, 2005, along with Marko Jaric in exchange for Sam Cassell. He played for the Timberwolves in the 2005–06 NBA preseason, but he was released into free agency before the regular season commenced.

He played in the Greek A1 league with AEK Athens BC from November 2005 to February 2006, when he then joined TAU Cerámica of the Spanish ACB.

He played with the Phoenix Suns' summer league team during the summer of 2006, but he was not retained by the Suns. He also played for the Atlanta Hawks during the 2006 preseason. After the Hawks waived him before the regular season began, Chalmers signed with Dinamo Banco di Sardegna Sassari of the Italian second division in December 2006. In May 2007, he signed with the Spanish ACB club Basket CAI Zaragoza.

In July 2007, Chalmers moved to the Italian first division team Benetton Treviso. After spending a season in Italy, he signed with the Russian club Universitet Yugra Surgut. He had a successful season in Surgut, as he was the top scorer of the Russian Basketball Super League with 21.4 points per game. In the 2009–10 season he played with another Super League club, Enisey Krasnoyarsk. In July 2010 he signed with BC Lokomotiv Kuban. In 2012, he joined Aliağa Petkim of Turkey. In October 2013, he signed a one-year deal with Levski Sofia. With them he won the National Basketball League of Bulgaria.

In July 2014, he signed with Chalons-Reims of the French LNB Pro A. On January 9, 2015, he parted ways with them.

== Coaching career ==
Chalmers began his coaching career in 2017 as a video coordinator of the Orlando Magic, becoming an associate coach/player development two years later. On August 8, 2021, he became one of the most important full time assistant coach with the Magic.

== Personal ==
Lionel's cousin, Mario Chalmers, formerly of the Kansas Jayhawks, was picked in the second round of the 2008 NBA draft by the Minnesota Timberwolves. He was later traded to the Miami Heat, with whom he won 2 consecutive NBA championships. He also has a wife and 3 children.
