= BC Irkut Irkutsk =

Russian Basketball Superleague 1 team

BC Irkut Irkutsk is a men's basketball club from the city of Irkutsk, Russia. Club competes in the Russian Basketball Superleague 1 and Russian Basketball Cup.

== Club history ==
Basketball club Irkut Irkutsk was founded in year of 2004. Club was founded on the basis of defunct basketball club Shakhtar from Irkutsk. BC Irkut has been playing in lower divisions until the end of season 2006/2007, when the team was promoted to Russian Basketball Superleague 1.

In March 2011 club withdrew from the league because of financial difficulties. In the 2013/2014 season BC Irkut returns to the Superleague, but finished on the last (14th) place. The club's biggest achievement occurred in 2016/2017 season of Superleague, when the team won the second place behind BC Universitet Yugra Surgut.

On 30 December 2018 club announced, that the team would not compete in Superleague 2018/19 because of financial issues.

== Achievements ==
Russian Superleague 1

- Silver medal: 2016/2017

== See also ==
- Official web page
- Team profile
