= Egor Vyaltsev =

Russian basketball player

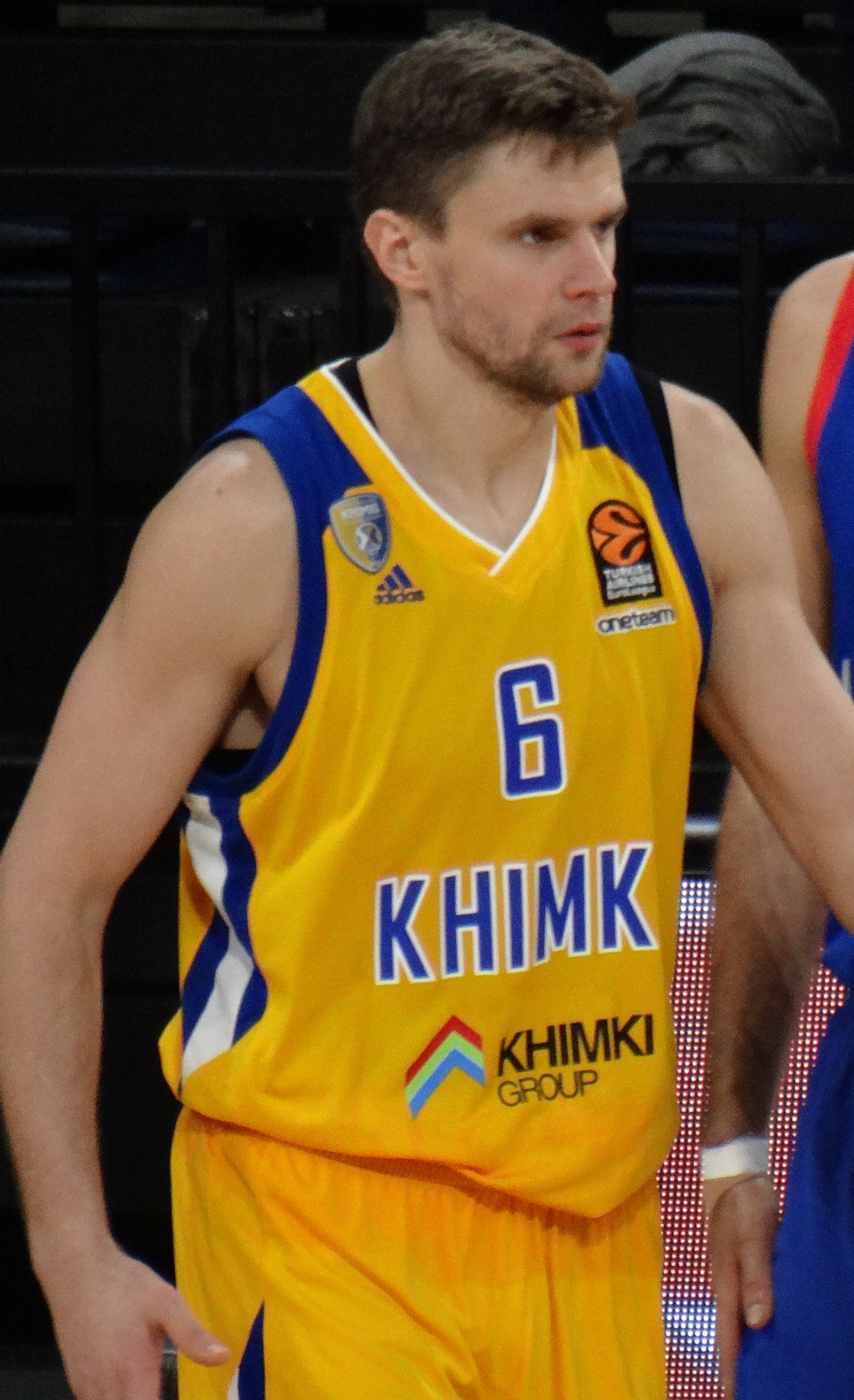

Personal information
- Born: 10 October 1985 (age 41) Voronezh, Soviet Union
- Listed height: 6 ft 4 in (1.93 m)
- Listed weight: 200 lb (91 kg)

Career information
- NBA draft: 2007: undrafted
- Playing career: 2003–2024
- Position: Shooting guard

Career history
- 2003–2004: CSKA Moscow
- 2004–2005: Samara
- 2005–2007: Ural Great Perm
- 2007–2011: Triumph Lyubertsy
- 2011–2021: Khimki
- 2021–2022: Samara
- 2022–2023: Zenit-2
- 2023–2024: BC Moscowsky

Egor Ivanovich Vyaltsev (Russian: Егор Иванович Вяльцев, born 10 October 1985) is a Russian former professional basketball player. He represented the senior Russian national basketball team.

== Professional career ==
Vyaltsev retired from professional basketball following the 2021-2022 season. In his final season for BC Zenit Saint Petersburg, he played 2 games scoring 8 points with 2 rebounds. He finished his career with 2,601 points, 789 rebounds and 838 assists.

== Russian national basketball team ==
Vyaltsev played with the Russian junior national teams between 2001 and 2005, most notably appearing with the Russian junior teams at the 2002 FIBA Europe Under-18 Championship, and the 2004 FIBA Europe Under-20 Championship.

Vyaltsev has also been a member of the senior Russian national basketball team. He was called up to the senior national team for the first time at EuroBasket 2007, but only saw action in one game for the team. He would be called up again for the EuroBasket 2009 and EuroBasket 2015, making 9 appearances across the 2 tournaments and 9.8 PPG.
