= Basketball in Russia =

Basketball has a long and rich history in Russia, dating back to the early 20th century. The sport was introduced to Russia even before the 1917 Revolution, but the game was not popular at that time. The country's first tournament took place only in 1923, and it quickly gained popularity among young people.

== Soviet Era ==
During the Soviet era, basketball became an important part of the country's sporting culture. The Soviet Union's national basketball team was one of the strongest in the world, and it won several Olympic medals, including gold in 1972, 1988, as well as three FIBA Basketball World Cup in 1967, 1974 and 1982.

== Soviet Union dissolution and Present Russia ==
After the collapse of the Soviet Union in 1991, basketball in Russia experienced some ups and downs. The country's economy went through a difficult period, which affected the funding and development of sports programs. However, Russian basketball has rebounded in recent years, with several teams achieving success in European and international competitions.

Today, Russia has a professional basketball league, the VTB United League, which includes teams from Russia, Belarus, Kazakhstan, and other surrounding countries. The league has produced many talented players, such as Andrei Kirilenko, Sergey Karasev, and Timofey Mozgov, who have gone on to play in the NBA.

== 2022 Russia ban ==
After the 2022 Russian invasion of Ukraine, FIBA banned Russian teams and officials from participating in FIBA basketball and FIBA 3x3 Basketball competitions.
