= Sergei Chikalkin =

Russian basketball player

Medal record

Men's basketball

Russian Basketball Super League
| Bronze medal – third place | 1997 Superleague A | BK Samara |
| Bronze medal – third place | 1998 Superleague A | BK Samara |
| Silver medal – second place | 1999 Superleague A | Avtodor |
| Silver medal – second place | 2000 Superleague A | Ural Great |
| Gold medal – first place | 2001 Superleague A | Ural Great |
| Bronze medal – third place | 2003 Superleague A | UNICS Kazan |
| Silver medal – second place | 2007 Superleague A | UNICS Kazan |

Sergei Chikalkin (born December 11, 1975) is a Russian former professional basketball player. The 1.96 m 95 kg (6'5" 210 pound) shooting guard is known for his long-range shooting accuracy. Started his career as a pro in 1995 with BK Samara. Chikalkin has played in Russia (BK Samara, Avtodor, Ural Great, UNICS Kazan), Italy (Benetton Treviso, 2001–02) and Ukraine (BC Kyiv). He won national championships in each country he played. He last played with CSK VSS Samara.

Trophies:

- Russian Cup Winner – 2 (2003 – UNICS Kazan; 2004 – Ural Great);
- Russian Cup Finalist – 1 (2007 – UNICS Kazan);
- Italian Champion – 1 (2002 – Benetton);
- Italian Super Cup Winner – 1 (2002 – Benetton);
- Ukrainian Champion – 1 (2005 – BC Kyiv);
- Ukrainian Vice-champion – 1 (2004 – BC Kyiv);
- NEBL Champion – 2 (2001 – Ural Great; 2003 – UNICS Kazan);
- FIBA Euroleague Finalist – 1 (2005 – BC Kyiv);

Honors:

- Russian All Star Game 2000;
- Russian League MVP 2001;
- NEBL MVP and NEBL Finals MVP 2001;
- FIBA Euroleague All Star Game 2004;

Russian National Teams:

- 1996 FIBA Under-22 European Championship;
- 1999 Summer Universiade;
- 2000 Olympic Games;
- 2001 FIBA Europe Championship;
- 2002 FIBA World Championship;
