= Chris Ledlum =

American basketball player (born 2001)

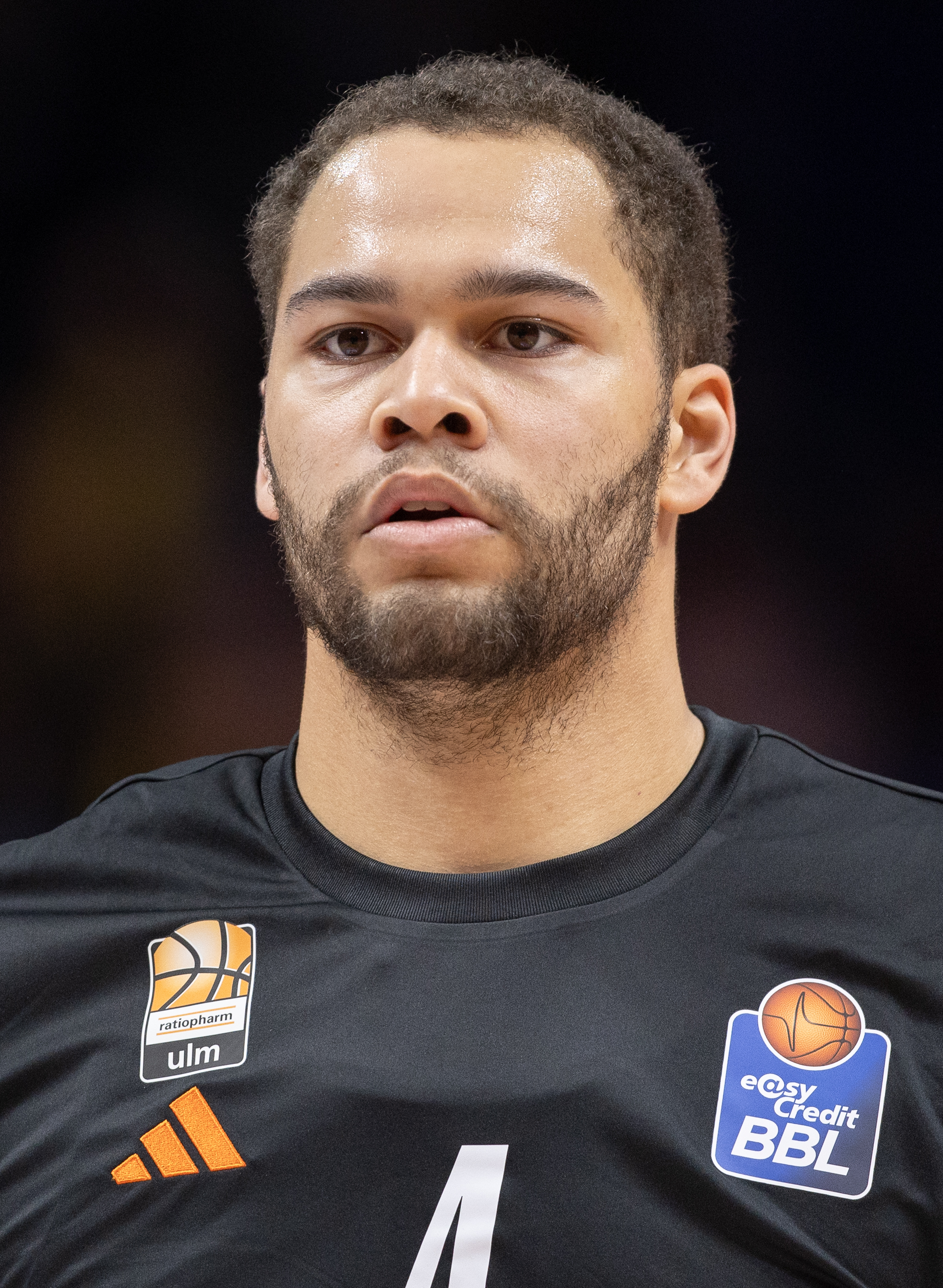
- Ledlum in 2025

No. 4 – Zenit Saint Petersburg
- Position: Small forward
- League: VTB United League

Personal information
- Born: February 19, 2001 (age 25) Brooklyn, New York, U.S.
- Listed height: 6 ft 6 in (1.98 m)
- Listed weight: 243 lb (110 kg)

Career information
- High school: Northfield Mount Hermon School (Gill, Massachusetts)
- College: Harvard (2019–2023); St. John's (2023–2024)
- NBA draft: 2024: undrafted
- Playing career: 2024–present

Career history
- 2024–2025: Élan Béarnais
- 2025–2026: Ratiopharm Ulm
- 2026–present: Zenit Saint Petersburg

Christopher Robert Devin Ledlum (born February 19, 2001) is an American professional basketball player for Zenit Saint Petersburg of the VTB United League. He played college basketball for the Harvard Crimson and St John's Red Storm.

== Early life ==
Ledlum attended St. Peter's Boys High School in Staten Island, New York and was a two year letterwinner at small forward. He first played basketball competitively when he joined his friends on the freshman basketball team. He also lettered in football as a wide receiver. He was then a one year letterwinner at Northfield Mount Hermon School in Gill, Massachusetts. He captained the team as a senior. He was the 2019 NEPSAC AAA Player of the Year, 2019 Gatorade Massachusetts Player of the Year and helped his team win the 2019 NEPSAC Championship. At Northfield Mount Hermon he set single-season and single-game scoring records. He competed on the Adidas circuit with the NY Jayhawks.

On November 1, 2018, Ledlum verbally committed to Harvard University, which he chose over offers from University of Florida and the University of Illinois.

== College career ==
=== Harvard University (2019–2023) ===
Ledlum was named Ivy League Rookie of the Week on November 18, 2019 after averaging 8.5 points per game. On December 9, he was named the Ivy League Rookie of the Week after helping his team beat University of Massachusetts Amherst. He scored 12 points and 8 rebounds in 19 minutes off the bench. On January 6, 2020, he was named the Ivy League Rookie of the Week for the second straight and fourth time of the season. On February 17, he was named the Ivy League Rookie of the Week for the fifth time. He averaged 9.5 points and 6.5 rebounds against Cornell University and Columbia University.

When Ledlum returned to campus in 2021, he tore the labrum in his hip. He played through the injury for 13 games and averaged 16.7 points and 9.3 rebounds, but the injury caused a sports hernia and groin tear where he missed the remainder of the season.

On November 29, 2021, he was named the Ivy League Player of the Week for the first time in his career. On December 1, he was named Harvard Student-Athlete of the Week after averaging a double-double with 16.3 points and 10 rebounds per game against Siena University and Colgate University.

In March 2022, he was named to the 2021-2022 Academic All-America men's basketball team selected by the College Sports Information Directors of America. He was one of 15 student-athletes recognized. On November 21, he earned Ivy League Player of the Week after averaging 23.5 points, 4 rebounds, and 2.5 assists per game against Northeastern University and Siena. On November 30, he earned Harvard Student-Athlete of the Week alongside Harmoni Turner after he averaged 18.5 points, 10 rebounds, 3.5 steals and 1.5 assists per game in games against Loyola University Chicago and Fordham University.

On January 11, 2023, he earned Harvard Student-Athlete of the Week after averaging 18 points, 11.5 rebounds, and 3.5 assists per game in games against Brown University and Yale University. In February, he earned College Sports Communicators Academic All-District honors. He was also a 2021-2022 Academic All-District and All-America selection. On February 20, he earned Ivy League Player of the Week for the second time that season. He averaged 25 points, 11 rebounds, 3 assists, 4 steals and 2.5 blocks per game in wins over Columbia University and Cornell University.

In March 2023, he earned the USBWA District I All-District Team honors after ranking second in the Ivy League in points per game and first in rebounds per game. That same month, he also earned Second Team Academic All-America honors for the second straight season.

In April 2023, he received the Raymond P. Lavietes Most Valuable Player Award and the Thomas G. Stemberg Iron Man Award, presented to the Harvard player who played the most minutes.

On April 19, Ledlum committed to play for Rick Barnes at University of Tennessee. On July 13, Ledlum re-entered the NCAA transfer portal after transferring to University of Tennessee.

=== St. John's University (2023–2024) ===
In August 2023, Ledlum transferred to St. John's University for the 2023–2024 season.

On April 17, 2024, he announced that he was entering the 2024 NBA Draft while still going through the process of acquiring a waiver from the NCAA.

On May 1, 2024, he entered the NCAA transfer portal as he waited to see his eligibility status. In May 2024, a Queens, New York judge made the final ruling that Ledlum and Jordan Dingle would not receive another year of eligibility. The two of them had been looking for injunctive relief that would allow them to play during the 2024–2025 season after being forced to not play during the 2020-2021 season based on the Ivy League COVID-19 regulations.

== Professional career ==
=== Élan Béarnais (2024–2025) ===
On May 12, 2025, he received a Hoops Agents ProB Player of the Week award after having a double-double of 29 points and 12 rebounds.

At the conclusion of the 2024-2025 season, Ledlum earned the Defensive Player of the Year of ProB and Forward of the Year of ProB.

In July 2025, Ledlum played in 2025 NBA Summer League with the Houston Rockets. He averaged 16.8 minutes, 7.2 points, 3.6 rebounds, and 2.0 blocks over five games.

=== Ratiopharm Ulm (2025–2026) ===
On August 6, 2025, Ledlum signed with Ratiopharm Ulm of the Basketball Bundesliga (BBL), for the 2025-2026 season.

On October 17, 2025, he was named the weekly Eurocup most valuable player award after scoring 26 points, the highest among all players on winning teams that week.

=== Zenit Saint Petersburg (2026–present) ===
On September 17, 2026, Ledlum signed with Zenit Saint Petersburg of the Russian VTB United League.
