= Andrei Kirilenko =

Russian basketball player (born 1981)

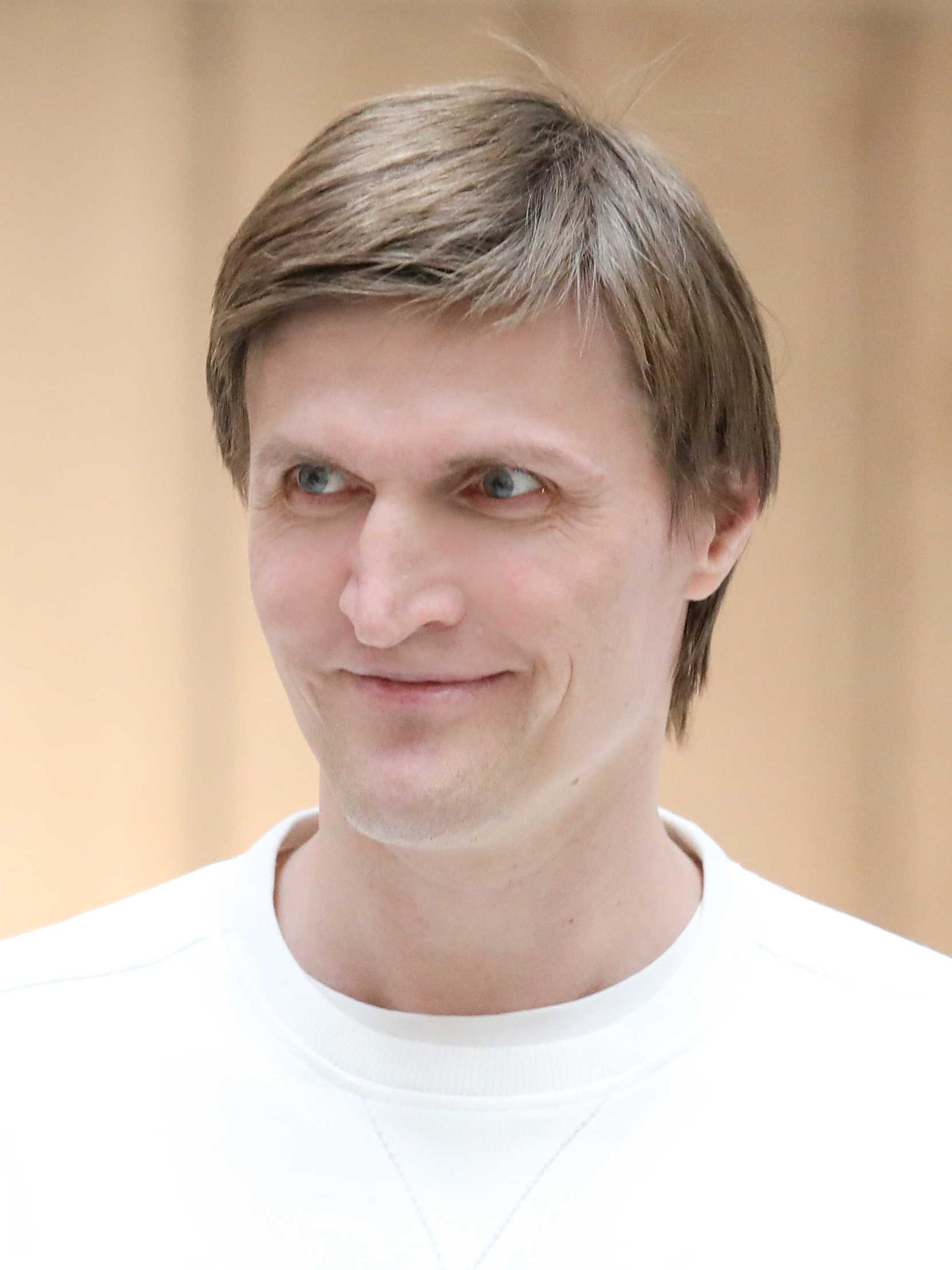
- Kirilenko in 2024

Personal information
- Born: February 18, 1981 (age 45) Izhevsk, Russian SFSR, Soviet Union
- Listed height: 6 ft 9 in (2.06 m)
- Listed weight: 235 lb (107 kg)

Career information
- NBA draft: 1999: 1st round, 24th overall pick
- Drafted by: Utah Jazz
- Playing career: 1997–2015
- Position: Power forward / small forward
- Number: 47, 15

Career history
- 1997–1998: Spartak St. Petersburg
- 1998–2001: CSKA Moscow
- 2001: Partizan
- 2001–2011: Utah Jazz
- 2011–2012: CSKA Moscow
- 2012–2013: Minnesota Timberwolves
- 2013–2014: Brooklyn Nets
- 2015: CSKA Moscow

Career highlights
- NBA All-Star (2004); NBA All-Defensive First Team (2006); 2× NBA All-Defensive Second Team (2004, 2005); NBA All-Rookie First Team (2002); NBA blocks leader (2005); FIBA EuroBasket MVP (2007); EuroLeague MVP (2012); All-EuroLeague First Team (2012); EuroLeague Best Defender (2012); EuroLeague rebounding leader (2012); 2× EuroLeague blocks leader (2001, 2012); 2× FIBA Europe Player of the Year (2007, 2012); Euroscar Player of the Year (2012); FIBA EuroStar (1999); 4× Russian Player of the Year (2004, 2005, 2007, 2008); Russian League MVP (2000); All-Russian League Symbolic First Team (2012); All-Russian League First Team (2012); 2× VTB United League champion (2012, 2015); VTB United League MVP (2012); VTB United League Final Four MVP (2012); VTB United League Hall of Fame (2019); FIBA Under-19 World Cup MVP (1999)

Career statistics
- Points: 9,431 (11.8 ppg)
- Rebounds: 4,352 (5.5 rpg)
- Assists: 2,169 (2.7 apg)
- Stats at NBA.com
- Stats at Basketball Reference
Medals
Men's basketball
Representing Russia
Summer Olympic Games
Bronze medal – third place	2012 London
EuroBasket
Gold medal – first place	2007 Spain
Bronze medal – third place	2011 Lithuania

Andrei Gennadyevich Kirilenko (Russian: Андрей Геннадьевич Кириленко; born February 18, 1981), is a Russian basketball executive and former professional player. Nicknamed AK-47, he played 10 seasons for the Utah Jazz of the National Basketball Association (NBA) between 2001 and 2011.

At age fifteen, Kirilenko began playing professional basketball in the Russian Basketball Super League. He played for CSKA Moscow from 1998 to 2001, winning league MVP honours in 2000. In 1999, he was selected by the Jazz with the 24th overall pick of the 1999 NBA draft. He became the first Russian player selected in the first round of an NBA draft and the youngest European player ever chosen in the NBA draft.

Kirilenko joined the Jazz in 2001 and played for the team until 2011. He made the NBA All-Rookie First Team, was an NBA All-Defensive Team pick three times, played in the 2004 All-Star Game, and led the NBA in blocked shots in the 2004–05 season. During the 2011 NBA lockout, Kirilenko returned to Russia to play for CSKA Moscow, leading the team to the 2012 EuroLeague Final. That year, he was named the EuroLeague MVP, earned an All-EuroLeague first team selection and won the EuroLeague Best Defender award. Kirilenko returned to the NBA for the 2012–13 season to play for the Minnesota Timberwolves before finishing his NBA career as a member of the Brooklyn Nets in 2013–14.

Kirilenko was a regular member of the Russian national team. He competed at the 2000 Summer Olympics and won the EuroBasket title in 2007, earning MVP honors in the process. At EuroBasket 2011, he and his team won a bronze medal. He was selected to the All-Tournament Team on both occasions. Kirilenko was named FIBA Europe Men's Player of the Year twice and won a Euroscar Player of the Year award in 2012.

Kirilenko was elected president of the Russian Basketball Federation in 2015.

== Early life ==
Kirilenko was born in the Soviet city of Izhevsk, Russia. When he was ten, he began playing organized basketball.

== Professional career ==
=== Spartak St. Petersburg (1997–1998) ===
In 1997, Kirilenko became the youngest player ever to compete in the Russian Super League, spending two seasons with Spartak Saint Petersburg.

=== CSKA Moscow (1998–2001) ===
Kirilenko joined CSKA Moscow in 1998. In his first season, he helped his new team win the Russian Super League championship. He was also selected to participate in the Russian All-Star game, helping the West beat the East 138–107 and winning the slam dunk contest.

On June 30, 1999, at age 18 years, 132 days, Kirilenko was the youngest foreign player at the time to be drafted in the National Basketball Association, when the Utah Jazz selected him with the 24th pick. Kirilenko was also the first Russian picked in the first round of an NBA Draft. However, he remained with CSKA Moscow for the next two seasons. In the 1999–2000 season, he helped his team win the championship of the North European Basketball League and its second Russian Super League championship in a row. On April 23, 2000, he participated in his second Russian All-Star game, helping the West beat the East 122–111. Despite being the odds-on favorite to win the slam dunk contest, he finished second to Harold Deane of Lokomotiv Mineralnye Vody.

He showed off his all-around skills in the 2000–01 SuproLeague, finishing in the top ten in 7 out of 8 statistical categories.

=== Partizan ===
In August 2001, Kirilenko signed a contract with Yugoslav team Partizan ICN which included an NBA-out clause option.

=== Utah Jazz (2001–2011) ===
Kirilenko joined the Utah Jazz on a rookie-scale contract in September 2001. On March 15, 2002, when starting in place of injured teammate Karl Malone, Kirilenko scored a then-career-high 27 points during a 100–97 win over the Detroit Pistons. He was named to the first team on the NBA All-Rookie Team. He would emerge as one of the top young players in the NBA, and one of the league's top weak-side defenders. He was selected to play in the 2004 NBA All-Star Game in Los Angeles. In the 2003–04 NBA season, he ranked third in the league in blocked shots per game and fourth in the league in steals per game, becoming just the second player in NBA history to rank in the top five in both categories (David Robinson ranked first in blocked shots per game and fifth in steals per game in the 1991–92 NBA season). During the NBA off-season, Kirilenko played for the Russian national basketball team.

Kirilenko became the leader of the Jazz in 2003 after John Stockton retired and Karl Malone left Utah to join the Los Angeles Lakers. He played and started in 78 of the Utah's 82 games and led them to a 42–40 record. Utah missed the playoffs by one game behind the Denver Nuggets. He finished fifth in Defensive Player of the Year voting and fourth in Most Improved Player voting and was named to the second team on the All-NBA Defensive Team. Kirilenko led the Jazz in many statistical categories:

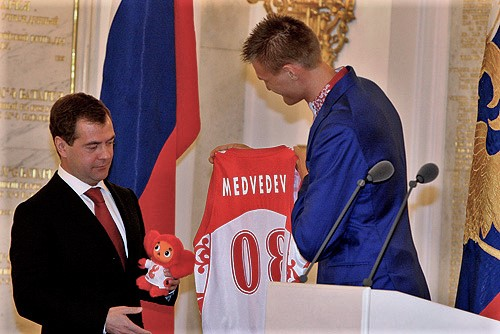
Kirilenko with Russian President Dmitry Medvedev in 2008

- Total points: 1,284
- Points per game: 16.5
- Total rebounds: 629
- Rebounds per game: 8.1
- Blocks: 215
- Blocks per game: 2.8
- Steals: 150
- Steals per game: 1.9
- Free throws made: 392
- Free throws attempted: 496
- Three-pointers made: 68
- Three-pointers attempted: 201

In the middle of the 2004–05 season against the Washington Wizards, Kirilenko sustained a broken right wrist, sidelining him for the remainder of the season. Despite only playing in 41 of 82 games for the Jazz, he amassed enough blocked shots during the season to qualify as the league leader in blocks per game, and was named to the second team on the NBA All-Defensive Team.

In the 2005–06 season Kirilenko was again among the league's best shot blockers and defenders. He recorded a career high 10 blocks against Indiana on March 26, and finished first in the league with total blocks (220) and second in blocks per game with 3.2, just behind league leader Marcus Camby at 3.3. He was named to the first team on the NBA All-Defensive Team.

Kirilenko averaged 15.3 points, 8 rebounds, 1.5 steals, 3.2 blocks and 4.3 assists per game in the 2005–2006 season.

Kirilenko and Hakeem Olajuwon are the only 2 NBA players who have finished a game with at least 6 steals, 6 blocks, 6 points, 6 rebounds, 6 assists since 1985–86.

The 2006–2007 season was a tremendous disappointment for Kirilenko. While playing in 70 games and not missing much playing time, he averaged career lows in points (8.3) and field goal attempts (6.0). It has been said that much of this decline can be attributed to the main offensive emphasis on Carlos Boozer, Deron Williams, and Mehmet Okur, and that Kirilenko was uncomfortable losing his position as the main go-to guy on the team. His frustration eventually culminated in a widely publicized breakdown near the end of the Jazz's first-round playoffs series against the Houston Rockets. Kirilenko bounced back to lead Russia to the championship in EuroBasket 2007, and was named MVP of the tournament. Following his performance in the 2007 EuroBasket, he asked to be released from his contract to return to Russia to play basketball.

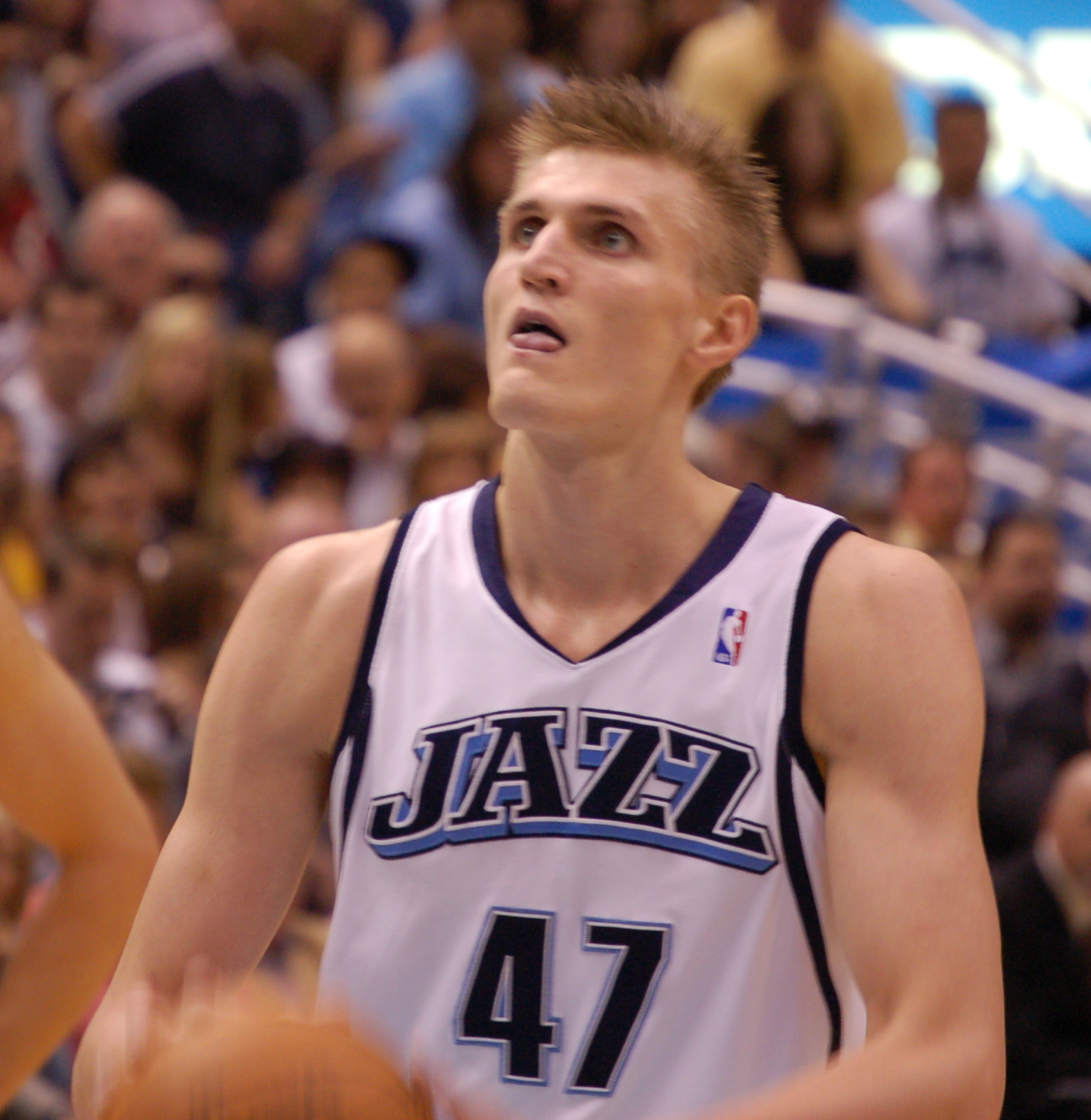
Kirilenko with the Jazz in 2008

Despite the trade rumors and controversy created by these statements, he rebounded in the 2007–08 NBA season and backed off on trade demands. His statistics for the 2007–08 NBA season were 11.0 ppg, 4.7 rpg, 4.0 apg, 1.2 spg, and 1.5 bpg, all of which were improvements over his previous season's stats (with the exception of blocks and rebounds). He worked out personally with former Jazz shooting guard Jeff Hornacek on his shooting in the 2007 off-season, and his field goal percentage improved from 47% to 51%. Most impressively, his 3-point shooting improved from 21% to a career-high 38%.

=== Return to CSKA (2011–2012) ===
Amid the 2011 NBA lockout, Kirilenko returned to Russia to play for his old team CSKA Moscow. Although the lockout was resolved in December, Kirilenko remained with CSKA Moscow for the rest of the season rather than pursuing an immediate return to the NBA. Over 17 games in the EuroLeague, he averaged 14.1 points and 7.5 rebounds in 29.9 minutes per game, leading the team to the 2012 EuroLeague Final. Kirilenko was named the EuroLeague MVP, earned an All-EuroLeague first team selection and won the EuroLeague Best Defender award.

=== Minnesota Timberwolves (2012–2013) ===
On July 27, 2012, Kirilenko signed with the Minnesota Timberwolves. He was the team's starting small forward, playing in 64 games during the 2012–13 NBA season. Kirilenko missed 18 games because of back spasms, then a right quadriceps strain, and finally a calf strain. He finished the season with averages of 12.4 points, 5.7 rebounds, 2.8 assists, and a 51% field goal percentage per game. He had his best game on November 14, 2012, when he had 26 points and 12 rebounds on an 89–87 loss to the Charlotte Bobcats. On June 29, 2013, Kirilenko opted out of the final year of his contract with the Timberwolves (worth $10 million) to become a free agent.

=== Brooklyn Nets (2013–2014) ===
On July 12, 2013, Kirilenko signed a two-year deal with the Brooklyn Nets. On June 23, 2014, he exercised his $3.3 million player option, re-signing with the Nets for the 2014–15 season. On November 21, 2014, he took a leave of absence from the Nets for personal reasons.

On December 11, 2014, Kirilenko was traded, along with Jorge Gutiérrez, the Nets' second round draft pick in 2020 and the right to swap second round picks in 2018, to the Philadelphia 76ers in exchange for Brandon Davies. The 76ers suspended Kirilenko without pay on January 9, 2015, for failing to report after the trade, and on February 21, he was waived by the 76ers before playing in a game for them.

=== Third stint with CSKA (2015) ===
On February 24, 2015, Kirilenko signed with CSKA Moscow of the VTB United League for the rest of the 2014–15 season, returning to the club for a third stint. With Kirilenko at the club for the second half of the season, CSKA Moscow managed to advance to the EuroLeague Final Four for the fourth straight season, after eliminating Panathinaikos for the second straight season in the quarterfinals, with a 3–1 series win. However, in the semi-final game, despite being dubbed by media as an absolute favorite to advance, Kirilenko's team, CSKA, once again lost to Olympiacos. The final score was 70–68, after a great Olympiacos comeback in the fourth quarter, led by Vassilis Spanoulis. CSKA Moscow eventually won the third place game, after defeating Fenerbahçe 86–80. Over 11 games played in the EuroLeague, he averaged 8.5 points and 5.3 rebounds per game. CSKA Moscow finished the season by winning the VTB United League, after eliminating Khimki with a 3–0 series win in the league's finals series.

On June 23, 2015, Kirilenko announced his retirement as a professional basketball player.

== National team career ==
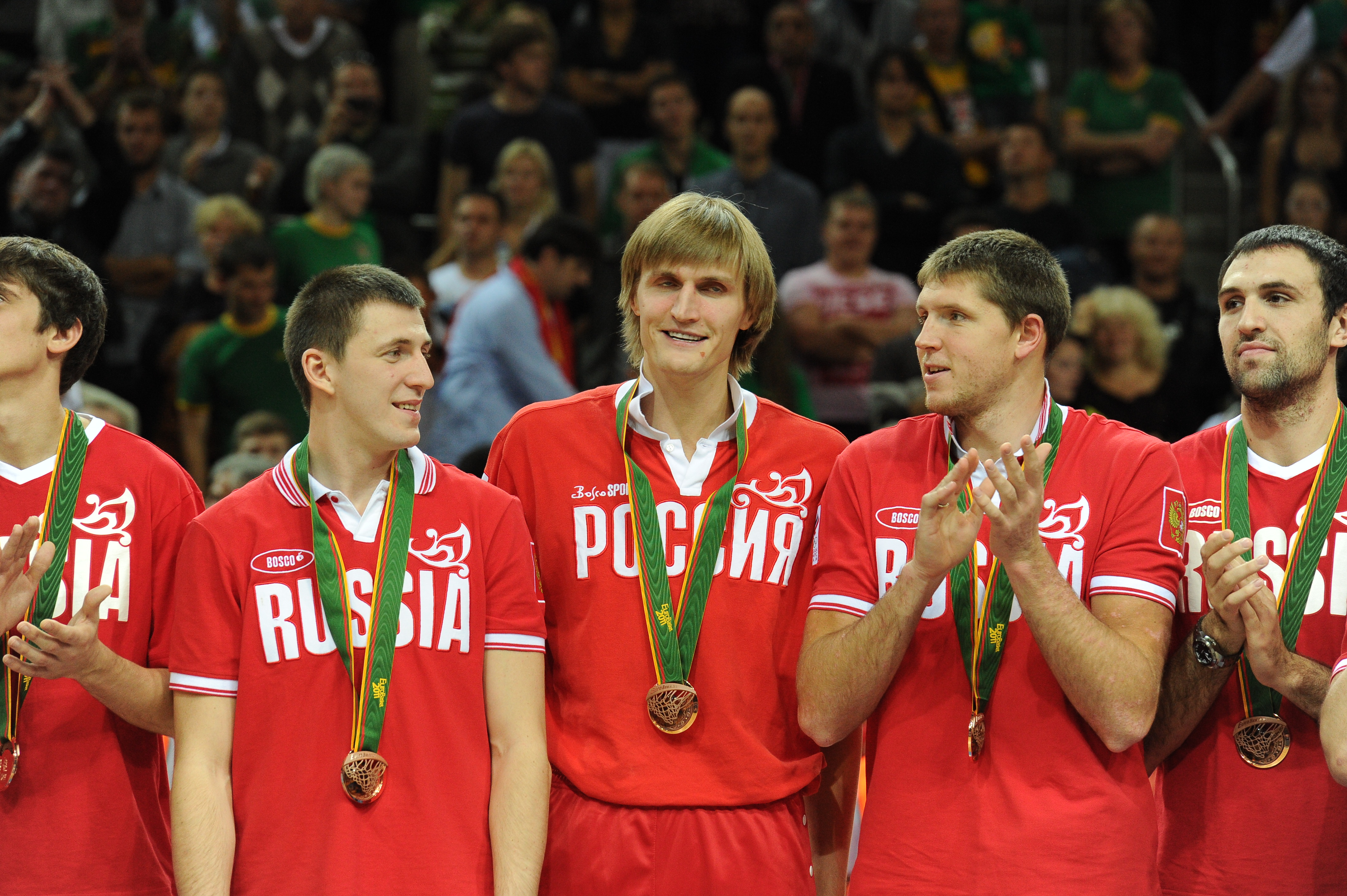
Kirilenko with some of his teammates from the Russian national basketball team in 2011.

As a member of the Russian junior national team, Kirilenko was the MVP of the 1999 FIBA Under-19 World Cup. Kirilenko's first major international tournament with the senior Russian national basketball team was at the 2000 Summer Olympics, where Russia finished the games in 8th place. Later, he played at the EuroBasket 2001, where Russia finished 5th among 16 teams. The only time that Kirilenko played in a FIBA World Cup was at the 2002 FIBA World Championship, where the Russian team finished 10th out of 16 teams. Kirilenko has also played at 4 more EuroBaskets: the EuroBasket 2003, the EuroBasket 2005, the EuroBasket 2007, where he won the gold medal of the competition, and was named the MVP of the tournament, and the EuroBasket 2011. With the win in the 2007 EuroBasket, Russia qualified to the 2008 Summer Olympics, where Kirilenko also played for Russia, and he was also named Russia's flag bearer for the Opening Ceremony of the games.

In the first game of the 2008 Olympics tournament against Iran, Kirilenko scored 15 points, pulled down 5 rebounds, and blocked 3 shots. Against Croatia, he led his team in points scored with 18, and he scored his personal best in the games against Argentina, scoring 23.

Kirilenko won a bronze medal with Russia at the 2012 Summer Olympics.

== Executive career ==
In August 2015, Kirilenko was elected president of the Russian Basketball Federation. He was re-elected to the post in August 2020.

== Career statistics ==
Legend
GP	Games played	GS	Games started	MPG	Minutes per game
FG%	Field-goal percentage	3P%	3-point field-goal percentage	FT%	Free-throw percentage
RPG	Rebounds per game	APG	Assists per game	SPG	Steals per game
BPG	Blocks per game	PPG	Points per game	PIR	Performance index rating
**Bold**	Career high

=== NBA ===
*	Led the league

==== Regular season ====
Year	Team	GP	GS	MPG	FG%	3P%	FT%	RPG	APG	SPG	BPG	PPG
2001–02	Utah	**82**	40	26.2	.450	.250	.768	4.9	1.1	1.4	1.9	10.7
2002–03	Utah	80	11	27.7	.491	.325	**.800**	5.3	1.7	1.5	2.2	12.0
2003–04	Utah	78	**78**	37.1	.443	.338	.790	**8.1**	3.1	**1.9**	2.8	**16.5**
2004–05	Utah	41	37	32.9	.493	.299	.784	6.2	3.2	1.6	**3.3***	15.6
2005–06	Utah	69	63	**37.7**	.460	.308	.699	8.0	**4.3**	1.5	3.2	15.3
2006–07	Utah	70	70	29.3	.471	.213	.728	4.7	2.9	1.1	2.1	8.3
2007–08	Utah	72	72	30.8	.506	**.379**	.770	4.7	4.0	1.2	1.5	11.0
2008–09	Utah	67	10	27.3	.449	.274	.785	4.8	2.6	1.2	1.1	11.6
2009–10	Utah	58	35	29.0	.506	.292	.744	4.6	2.7	1.4	1.2	11.9
2010–11	Utah	64	62	31.2	.467	.367	.770	5.1	3.0	1.3	1.2	11.7
2012–13	Minnesota	64	64	31.8	.507	.292	.752	5.7	2.8	1.5	1.0	12.4
2013–14	Brooklyn	45	4	19.0	**.513**	.200	.513	3.2	1.6	.9	.4	5.0
2014–15	Brooklyn	7	0	5.1	0.0	0.0	.750	1.1	.1	.1	.0	.4
Career		797	546	30.2	.474	.310	.754	5.5	2.7	1.4	1.8	11.8
All-Star		1	0	12.0	.333	.000	.000	1.0	.0	.0	1.0	2.0

==== Playoffs ====
Year	Team	GP	GS	MPG	FG%	3P%	FT%	RPG	APG	SPG	BPG	PPG
2002	Utah	4	4	30.5	.393	.000	.813	3.8	1.0	1.8	**2.5**	8.8
2003	Utah	5	0	29.0	.419	.143	.875	4.8	1.4	.6	2.0	**11.6**
2007	Utah	**17**	**17**	31.0	.447	**.333**	.785	**5.2**	**2.6**	.9	2.4	9.6
2008	Utah	12	12	**32.3**	.447	.227	.714	3.4	2.5	1.5	1.7	11.0
2009	Utah	5	3	27.2	.468	.200	.714	2.8	2.0	**2.2**	.6	11.0
2010	Utah	2	0	15.0	**.500**	.000	**1.000**	3.0	.0	.5	.5	5.5
2014	Brooklyn	10	0	14.4	.467	.000	.647	2.3	1.0	1.0	.3	2.5
Career		55	36	27.1	.445	.208	.767	3.9	1.9	1.2	1.6	8.7

=== EuroLeague ===
*	Led the league

Year	Team	GP	GS	MPG	FG%	3P%	FT%	RPG	APG	SPG	BPG	PPG	PIR
FIBA EuroLeague
1998–99	CSKA Moscow	7	0	9.0	**.625**	.000	**.773**	1.4	.1	1.1	.0	5.3	9.0
1999–00	CSKA Moscow	19	19	26.9	.579	.200	.646	6.2	1.8	**2.5**	.5	11.5	21.1
FIBA SuproLeague
2000–01	CSKA Moscow	**22**	**22**	**33.7**	.575	.281	.647	**9.2**	**2.6**	2.0	**2.1***	13.9	**27.0**
EuroLeague
2011–12	CSKA Moscow	17	17	29.9	.533	.417	.758	7.5*	2.4	1.5	1.9*	**14.1**	24.2*
2014–15	CSKA Moscow	11	9	19.3	.518	**.462**	.682	5.3	1.2	1.1	1.2	8.5	13.9
Career		76	67	26.8	.561	.342	.687	6.8	1.9	1.8	1.4	11.8	21.3

== Player profile ==
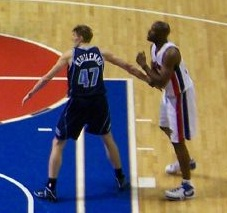
Kirilenko in 2006 as a member of the Utah Jazz.

Kirilenko was a versatile "big man" who could play either forward spot. He was noted for his high-level play in both offense (11.8 points and 5.5 rebounds per game NBA career averages) and defense (twice topping three blocks per game for a season). On offense, he was proficient in drawing fouls, passing, and possessed a quick first step. He was three times selected into the NBA All-Defensive First or Second Team. Staples of Kirilenko's defensive power were his shot blocking (with an NBA career average of 1.8 per game) and in stealing the ball (NBA career average of 1.4 per game).

On January 3, 2006, against the Los Angeles Lakers, Kirilenko posted a stat line of 14 points, 8 rebounds, 9 assists, 6 steals, and 7 blocks. This was the third time in his career he achieved a five-by-five, making him one of only three players (the others being Hakeem Olajuwon and Victor Wembanyama) to achieve this feat more than once in NBA history. It was also the first-ever regulation "5×6" — a game in which a player registers at least 6 points, 6 rebounds, 6 assists, 6 blocks, and 6 steals — since the NBA began recording blocks and steals in the 1973–74 season. In 1987, Olajuwon had 38 points, 17 rebounds, 12 blocks, 7 steals, and 6 assists for the Houston Rockets, in a double-overtime win over the Seattle SuperSonics, the only other time a player has earned a 5×6.

In June 2015, FiveThirtyEight reviewed Kirilenko's statistics, finding that his efficiency in scoring, steals, blocks, assists, offensive rebounds, and all-around versatility would justify consideration for the Basketball Hall of Fame.

Kirilenko is nicknamed "AK-47" in reference to his initials, the jersey number he wore, and the AK-47 rifle. Coincidentally, Kirilenko was born in the city of Izhevsk, in the former Soviet Union (now in Russia) where the weapon was first manufactured.

== Personal life ==
Kirilenko is married to Russian pop singer Masha "Marina" Lopatova, whose stage name is MaLo. Lopatova is the daughter of Russian basketball player Andrey Lopatov. Kirilenko met Lopatova at a youth basketball camp in Moscow, and Kirilenko appeared in one of Lopatova's music videos. In January 2011, Kirilenko and his wife acquired American citizenship. The couple have three sons, Fedor, Stepan and Andrey, and a daughter named Alexandra. They live in Los Angeles.

Sources suggest Kirilenko was a World of Warcraft (WoW) gamer while playing in the NBA. In the words of former NBA player Channing Frye, he shared a story about being up at 3 a.m. the night before an NBA game while playing WoW, when he noticed Kirilenko was online as well. Frye asked Kirilenko "Aren’t you playing tomorrow?", referring to the next day's NBA game, and Kirilenko replied "Yeah, probably."

== See also ==
- List of NBA career blocks leaders
- List of NBA annual blocks leaders
- List of NBA single-game blocks leaders
- 2008 Summer Olympics national flag bearers
- List of European basketball players in the United States

Olympic Games
Preceded by Alexander Popov	Flagbearer for Russia; Beijing 2008	Succeeded by Maria Sharapova
