= Russian Basketball Federation =

National sports governing body

- Sport: Basketball
- Jurisdiction: Russia
- Abbreviation: RBF
- Founded: 1991; 35 years ago
- Affiliation: FIBA
- Affiliation date: 1947
- Regional affiliation: FIBA Europe
- Headquarters: Moscow
- President: Andrei Kirilenko
- Secretary: Natalia Galkina
- Coach: Sergei Bazarevich

Official website
- russiabasket.ru
- Other key staff: Alexander Krasnenkov (CEO)
- (Russia)

Russian Basketball Federation (Russian: Российская Федерация Баскетбола, romanized: Rossiyskaya Federatsiya Basketbola), also known as RBF, is a national governing body of basketball in Russia. It was founded in 1991, and is the successor to the Soviet Basketball Federation. After the 2022 Russian invasion of Ukraine, FIBA banned Russian teams and officials from participating in FIBA basketball and FIBA 3x3 Basketball competitions. In February 2022, Russia and Belarus were suspended from international competitions until further notice due to Russia's invasion of Ukraine. It also banned Russia from hosting any competitions. In addition, FIBA Europe mandated that no official basketball competitions be held in Russia, while the teams of the Russian Basketball Federation were withdrawn from national team competitions and the club competition season 2022-23.

== Leagues ==
- Russian Super League 1: Original premier men's basketball league, and current secondary men's basketball league.
- Russian Women's Basketball Premier League: Premier women's basketball league.

== Presidents ==
- Pavel Morozov – 1991 to 1994.
- Sergei Belov – 1995 to 1998.
- V. Kuzin – 1998 to 2003.
- Sergey Chernov – 2003 to 2011.
- Alexander Krasnenkov – 2011 to 2013.
- Yulia Anikeeva – 2013.
- Andrei Kirilenko – since 2015.

== See also ==
- Russian basketball league system
