= Temp-SUMZ-UGMK Revda =

- Leagues: Russian Super League 1
- Founded: August 23, 1999; 25 years ago
- History: Temp-SUMZ Revda (1999–2015); Temp-SUMZ-UGMK Revda (2015–present)
- Arena: Sports Club Temp-SUMZ
- Location: Revda, Sverdlovsk Oblast, Russia
- Team colors: Black, Blue and White
- President: Bagir Abdulazizov
- Head coach: Oleg Meleshchenko
- Website: bctemp.ru
Home	Away

Temp-SUMZ-UGMK Revda (Russian: БК «Темп-СУМЗ-УГМК Ревда») is a basketball team of the second-tier Russian Super League based in Revda, Russia. The club was founded on the basis of the Temp sports complex and the Middle-Uralian Copper-Smelting Plant (Среднеуральский медеплавильный завод).

== History ==
The milestone of the Temp-SUMZ Revda dates back to in 1986. The first coach was Sergey Viktorovich Gubin, who headed the team for a long period. After a major team overhaul in 1994, Revda claimed the second place at the 1997 regional championships of the Sverdlovsk Oblast and a year later won bronze. In August 1999, Gubin and Nikolay Bayus, director of the Temp sports complex, asked the director of SUMZ, Alexander Kozizyn, to bring the team into the national fourth-tier A league. Kosizyn then became president of the team, and 23 August 1999 is seen as the date when it was founded. Vladimir Vorozhtsov became the new head coach.

After reaching the second place in the A league in the 1999–2000 season, Temp-SUMZ Revda moved to the Higher League. In the next season Revda became 14 out of 16. Under the coaching of Master of Sports Valery Korostelev the team became runner-up in the 2001–02 season and moved to Super League, division B. In the following years, Revda played there moderately. One of its best results was fourth place in 2008–09 and 2010–11. Temp-SUMZ for the first time reached the podium of the Super League in 2016, losing in the final to PSK Sakhalin.
