= Russian Basketball Super League 1 =

Sports league

- Organising body: Russian Basketball Federation
- Founded: 1992; 34 years ago
- First season: 1992–93
- Country: Russia
- Confederation: FIBA Europe (Europe)
- Number of teams: 16
- Level on pyramid: 2
- Promotion to: VTB United League
- Relegation to: Russian Basketball Super League 2
- Domestic cup: Russian Cup
- Current champions: Temp-SUMZ-UGMK Revda (1st title) (2024–25)
- Most championships: CSKA Moscow (17 titles)
- Website: russiabasket.ru/competitions/1936/superliga

The Russian Basketball Super League 1, or Super Liga 1, (Russian: Баскетбольная Cуперлига 1), formerly known as the Russian Basketball Super League A or the Russian Basketball Super Liga A, is a men's professional basketball league that was the pre-eminent league of Russian professional basketball until 2010. Currently, it is the second-tier division of the Russian professional basketball pyramid. The league is run by the Russian Basketball Federation (RBF).

== History ==
It was founded in 1991 as Premier League and it was renamed to Super League for the 1994-95 season. After the introduction of the Super League B in 2000, it was renamed to Super League A.

After being the first-tier division of Russian basketball, from its first season in 1991–92, the Super League A was relegated to being the second-tier division of Russian basketball after the 2009–10 season, and was replaced with a different first-tier league, starting with the 2010–11 season of the Russian Professional Basketball League (PBL). The successor league to the Super League 1 was not controlled by the Russian Basketball Federation (RBF), like the Super League 1 is, but by a separate body named the Professional Basketball League (PBL).

From the 2010–11 season onward, the Super League A and Super League B (the previous second division of the Russian basketball pyramid) divisions were united into a single league that serves as the second tier of Russian basketball, named the Super League 1. The 2010–11 season featured 11 clubs.

== Clubs 2021/2022 ==
- BC Samara
- Runa Basket Moscow
- Temp-SUMZ Revda
- Irkut Irkutsk
- Uralmash Yekaterinburg
- Universitet Yugra Surgut
- Novosibirsk
- Barnaul
- Ufimets Ufa
- Khimki
- CSKA Moscow-2
- Dome Springs Izhevsk
- MBA Moscow
- Lokomotiv Kuban 2
- Dynamo Vladivostok

== Super League A (first-tier league) champions 1992-2010 ==
- 1991–92 CSKA Moscow
- 1992–93 CSKA Moscow
- 1993–94 CSKA Moscow
- 1994–95 CSKA Moscow
- 1995–96 CSKA Moscow
- 1996–97 CSKA Moscow
- 1997–98 CSKA Moscow
- 1998–99 CSKA Moscow
- 1999–00 CSKA Moscow
- 2000–01 Ural Great
- 2001–02 Ural Great
- 2002–03 CSKA Moscow
- 2003–04 CSKA Moscow
- 2004–05 CSKA Moscow
- 2005–06 CSKA Moscow
- 2006–07 CSKA Moscow
- 2007–08 CSKA Moscow
- 2008–09 CSKA Moscow
- 2009–10 CSKA Moscow

Club	Winners	Winning years
CSKA Moscow	17	1992–2000, 2003–2010
Ural Great Perm	2	2001, 2002

== Super League 1 (second-tier league) champions 2011-present ==
- 2011 Spartak Primorye
- 2012 Ural Yekaterinburg
- 2013 Ural Yekaterinburg
- 2014 Avtodor Saratov
- 2015 Novosibirsk
- 2016 PSK Sakhalin
- 2017 Universitet Yugra Surgut
- 2018 BC Spartak Primorye
- 2019 BC Samara
- 2020 not awarded
- 2021 BC Samara
- 2022 Uralmash Yekaterinburg
- 2023 Uralmash Yekaterinburg
- 2024 Dinamo Vladivostok
- 2025 Temp-SUMZ-UGMK Revda

Club	Winners	Winning years
Ural Yekaterinburg	2	2012, 2013
Uralmash Yekaterinburg	2	2022, 2023
BC Samara	2	2019, 2021
Spartak Primorye	2	2011, 2018
Avtodor Saratov	1	2014
Novosibirsk	1	2015
PSK Sakhalin	1	2016
Universitet Yugra Surgut	1	2017
Dinamo Vladivostok	1	2024
Temp-SUMZ-UGMK Revda	1	2025

Finals

Season	Champion	Score	Runner-up
2011	Spartak Primorye	2-0	Universitet Yugra Surgut
2012	Ural Yekaterinburg	2-1	Universitet Yugra Surgut
2013	Ural Yekaterinburg	3-1	Universitet Yugra Surgut
2014	Avtodor Saratov	3-0	Universitet Yugra Surgut
2015	Novosibirsk	3-0	Spartak Primorye
2016	PSK Sakhalin	3-1	Temp-SUMZ-UGMK Revda
2017	Universitet Yugra Surgut	3-0	BC Irkut Irkutsk
2018	Spartak Primorye	3-2	BC Samara
2019	BC Samara	3-0	Spartak Saint Petersburg
2020		not awarded (Note: Spartak Primorye and BC Samara were top of the table after 26 games)	
2021	BC Samara	3-2	Uralmash Yekaterinburg
2022	Uralmash Yekaterinburg	3-0	PBC Runa Basket Moscow
2023	Uralmash Yekaterinburg	3-0	PBC Runa Basket Moscow
2024	Dinamo Vladivostok	3-1	BC Khimki
2025	Temp-SUMZ-UGMK Revda	3-1	CSKA Moscow II

Source:eurobasket.com

== Super League A (first-tier league) regular season winners 1992-2010 ==
- 1995 CSKA Moscow
- 1996 CSKA Moscow
- 1997 Avtodor Saratov
- 1998 Avtodor Saratov
- 1999 CSKA Moscow
- 2000 CSKA Moscow
- 2001 Ural Great Perm
- 2002 Ural Great Perm
- 2003 CSKA Moscow
- 2004 CSKA Moscow
- 2005 CSKA Moscow
- 2006 CSKA Moscow
- 2007 CSKA Moscow
- 2008 CSKA Moscow
- 2009 CSKA Moscow
- 2010 CSKA Moscow

== Super League 1 (second-tier league) regular season winners 2011-present ==
- 2011 Universitet Yugra Surgut
- 2012 Ural Yekaterinburg
- 2013 Universitet Yugra Surgut
- 2014 Avtodor Saratov
- 2015 Samara SGEU
- 2016 PSK Sakhalin
- 2017 Novosibirsk
- 2018 BC Samara
- 2019 Vostok-65
- 2020 Spartak Primorye
- 2021 Samara
- 2022 Uralmash Yekaterinburg
- 2023 Uralmash Yekaterinburg
- 2024 Khimki
- 2025 Temp-SUMZ-UGMK Revda

Club	Winners	Winning years
CSKA Moscow	12	1995, 1996, 1999, 2000, 2003–2010
Avtodor Saratov	3	1997, 1998, 2014
Samara	3	2015, 2018, 2021
Ural Great Perm	2	2001, 2002
Universitet Yugra Surgut	2	2011, 2013
Uralmash Yekaterinburg	2	2022, 2023
Ural Yekaterinburg	1	2012
PSK Sakhalin	1	2016
Novosibirsk	1	2017
Khimki	1	2024
Temp-SUMZ-UGMK Revda	1	2025

== Awards ==
=== MVP ===
Year	Player	Team
1994	(Russia) Valeri Tikhonenko	CSK VVS-Samara
1995	(Russia) Valeri Tikhonenko	CSK VVS-Samara
1999	(Russia) Andrei Fetisov	Avtodor Saratov
2001	(Russia) Sergei Chikalkin	Ural Great Perm

Year	Player	Team
2004	(United States) Marcus Brown	CSKA Moscow
2005	(Greece) Theo Papaloukas	CSKA Moscow
2006	(Greece) Theo Papaloukas	CSKA Moscow
2007	(Greece) Theo Papaloukas	CSKA Moscow
2008	(United States) Trajan Langdon	CSKA Moscow
2009	(Lithuania) Ramūnas Šiškauskas	CSKA Moscow

=== Coaches ===
Year	Player	Team
2004	(Serbia) Dušan Ivković	CSKA Moscow
2005	(United States) / (Israel) David Blatt	BC Dynamo Saint Petersburg
2006	(Italy) Ettore Messina	CSKA Moscow
2007	(Italy) Ettore Messina	CSKA Moscow
2008	(Italy) Ettore Messina	CSKA Moscow
2009	(Italy) Ettore Messina	CSKA Moscow

== Topscorers ==
=== Per game ===
Top tier

Year	Player	Team	PPG
2008	(United States) Lee Nailon	Sibirtelecom Lokomotiv Novosibirsk	22.0
2009	(United States) Lionel Chalmers	Universitet Yugra Surgut	21.0
2010	(Russia) Sergey Bykov	Dynamo Moscow	20.8

Second tier

Year	Player	Team	PPG
2011	(Serbia) Nikola Lepojević	Universitet Yugra Surgut	23.0
2012	(Serbia) Nikola Lepojević	Ural Yekaterinburg	18.6
2013	(United States) Steve Burtt Jr.	Avtodor Saratov	21.5
2014	(Serbia) Nikola Lepojević	Universitet Yugra Surgut	
2015	(Serbia) Nikola Lepojević	Universitet Yugra Surgut	22.7
2016	(Serbia) Nikola Lepojević	Universitet Yugra Surgut	21.3
2017	(Serbia) Nikola Lepojević	Universitet Yugra Surgut	22.2
2018	(Serbia) Nikola Lepojević (7)	Universitet Yugra Surgut	21.2
2019	(United States) Kahlil Dukes	Universitet Yugra Surgut	25.8
2020	(United States) Andre Walker	Universitet Yugra Surgut	22.3
2021	(United States) (Nigeria) Ike Nwamu	BC Samara	19.6
2022	(Russia) Grigory Motovilov	BC Izhevsk	19.7
2023	(Russia) Alimdzhan Fedyushin	BC Barnaul Altayskiy Kray	19.2
2024	(Russia) Yegor Bestuzhev	Dynamo Vladivostok	17.4
2025	(Russia) Alimdzhan Fedyushin (2)	Lokomotiv Kuban II	20.2

Source: eurobasket.com

=== Total points ===
Second tier

Year	Player	Team	Pts
2011	(Serbia) Nikola Lepojević	Universitet Yugra Surgut	963
2012	(Serbia) Nikola Lepojević	Ural Yekaterinburg	668
2013	(United States) Christopher Monroe	Ural Yekaterinburg	553
2014	(Serbia) Nikola Lepojević	Universitet Yugra Surgut	201

== Name history ==
- Premier League (1991-1994)
- Super League (1994-2000)
- Super League A (2000-2010)
- Super League 1 (2010-present)

== Predecessor league ==
- USSR Premier League: (1923–1992)

== Successor leagues ==
- Russian Professional League: (2010–2013)
- VTB United League: (2008–present)

== See also ==
- Russian Professional Championship: (1991–present)
- Russian Professional League: (2010–2013)
- Russian Cup: (1999–present)
- VTB United League: (2008–present)
- USSR Premier League: (1923–1992)
- USSR Cup: (1949–1987)
- Russian basketball league system
- Basketball in Russia
- Russian Basketball All-Star Game
