= Universitet Yugra Surgut =

Universitet Yugra
- Leagues: Russian Super League 1
- Founded: 1974; 51 years ago
- History: Stroitel (1974–1993); Universitet (1993–2005); Universitet Yugra (2005–present)
- Arena: Sport Palace Sparta
- Capacity: 3,000
- Location: Surgut, Russia
- Team colors: Green and White
- President: Vyacheslav Novitskiy
- Website: BK Surgut.ru
Home	Away

Universitet Yugra, also called Universitet Yugra Surgut is a Russian professional basketball team. The team competes in the Russian Super League.

== Honours ==
- Russian Basketball Super League 1
  - Winners (2): 2003-04, 2016–17

== Roster ==
Universitet Yugra Surgut roster
Players
Coaches

Pos.	No.	Nat.	Name	Ht.	Wt.	Age
F	6	(Russia)	Khayretdinov, Ruslan	1.94 m (6 ft 4 in)	82 kg (181 lb)	38 – 27 July 1987
F	7	(Russia)	Komarovski, Andrei	1.95 m (6 ft 5 in)	95 kg (209 lb)	40 – 23 February 1985
G/F	9	(Russia)	Krasnikov, Sergei	2.01 m (6 ft 7 in)	100 kg (220 lb)	46 – 4 July 1979
G	17	(Russia)	Vokhmyanin, Andrei	1.84 m (6 ft 0 in)	88 kg (194 lb)	44 – 17 May 1981
F	22	(Russia)	Pervukhin, Dmitri	2.06 m (6 ft 9 in)	95 kg (209 lb)	39 – 16 May 1986

Head coach

- Vacant

Assistant coach(es)

Legend

- (C) Team captain
- Injured

- Roster
Updated: 2009-01-30

== Notable players ==
Note: Flags indicate national team eligibility at FIBA-sanctioned events. Players may hold other non-FIBA nationalities not displayed.

Criteria

To appear in this section a player must have either:

- Set a club record or won an individual award while at the club
- Played at least one official international match for their national team at any time
- Played at least one official NBA match at any time.

- (Russia) Anatoly Kashirov
- (United States) Lionel Chalmers
