= 2019–20 BC Zenit Saint Petersburg season =

Zenit Saint Petersburg
2020–21 season
- Chairman: Alexander Tserkovny
- Head coach: Xavi Pascual
- Arena: Sibur Arena
- VTB United League: Scheduled
- EuroLeague: Scheduled
Home	Away
- All statistics correct as of 18 August 2019.

The 2019–20 BC Zenit Saint Petersburg season will be the 17th season in the existence of the club and its 6th season as the team entitled Zenit. The club will play in the VTB United League and EuroLeague.

It will be the second season under head coach Joan Plaza. On 27 June 2019, EuroLeague Basketball announced it awarded Zenit a wild card for the 2019–20 EuroLeague. This season therefore marks Zenit's debut in the highest European tier.

To participate in the tournament, the roster of Zenit was mostly changed - not only foreign but also Russian experienced players left the team: Andrey Desyatnikov, Evgeny Valiev and Sergey Karasev moved to Khimki. They were changed by also experienced players from other Russian clubs: Andrey Zubkov (from Khimki), Anton Ponkrashov (from UNICS Kazan), Dmitry Khvostov and Mateusz Ponitka (both - from Lokomotiv Kuban) and some players from foreign leagues: Andrew Albicy (from Andorra), Alex Renfroe (from Partizan Belgrade), Austin Hollins (from Rasta Vechta), Gustavo Ayón (from Real Madrid), Will Thomas (from Valencia), Colton Iverson and Tim Abromaitis (both - from Iberostar Tenerife).

== Players ==
=== Squad information ===
Note: Flags indicate national team eligibility at FIBA-sanctioned events. Players may hold other non-FIBA nationalities not displayed.

Zenit Saint Petersburg roster
Players
Coaches

Pos.	No.	Nat.	Name	Ht.	Age
G/F	9	(United States)	Hollins, Austin	1.93 m (6 ft 4 in)	34 – 8 November 1991
PF	10	(United States)	Thomas, Will	2.03 m (6 ft 8 in)	40 – 1 July 1986
PG	13	(Russia)	Khvostov, Dmitry	1.90 m (6 ft 3 in)	36 – 21 October 1989
C	14	(Russia)	Pushkov, Anton	2.08 m (6 ft 10 in)	37 – 22 November 1988
SF	16	(Russia)	Trushkin, Vladislav	2.01 m (6 ft 7 in)	33 – 5 May 1993
PF	20	(Russia)	Zubkov, Andrey	2.05 m (6 ft 9 in)	35 – 29 June 1991
SF	25	(Poland)	Ponitka, Mateusz	1.98 m (6 ft 6 in)	32 – 29 October 1993
G		(Canada)	Pangos, Kevin	1.88 m (6 ft 2 in)	33 – 26 January 1993
G/F		(United States)	Rivers, K.C.	1.96 m (6 ft 5 in)	39 – 1 March 1987
C		(Lithuania)	Gudaitis, Artūras	2.11 m (6 ft 11 in)	33 – 19 June 1993
F/C		(United States)	Poythress, Alex	2.06 m (6 ft 9 in)	33 – 6 September 1993
G		(United States)	Baron, Billy	1.88 m (6 ft 2 in)	35 – 11 December 1990
SG		(Russia)	Fridzon, Vitaly	1.95 m (6 ft 5 in)	40 – 14 October 1985

Head coach

- (Spain) Xavi Pascual

Assistant coach(es)

- (Spain) Inigo Zorzano
- (Greece) Adamantios Panagiotopoulos
- (Russia) Sergey Voznyuk

Team manager

- (Greece) Manos Papadopoulos

Legend

- (C) Team captain
- Injured

- Roster
Updated: September 26, 2019

=== Depth chart ===
Pos.	Starting 5	Bench 1	Bench 2
C	Arturas Gudaitis	Anton Pushkov
PF	Will Thomas	Alex Poythress	Andrey Zubkov
SF	Mateusz Ponitka	K.C. Rivers	Vladislav Trushkin
SG	Austin Hollins	Billy Baron	Evgeny Voronov
PG	Kevin Pangos	Alex Renfroe	Dmitry Khvostov

=== Transactions ===
==== In ====
Pos.	#	Player	Moving from	Date	Ref.
G		(France) Andrew Albicy	(Spain) Andorra	17 June 2019	
PG		(Bosnia and Herzegovina) Alex Renfroe	(Serbia) Partizan	19 June 2019	
PF/C		(Russia) Andrey Zubkov	(Russia) Khimki	24 June 2019	
PG		(Russia) Dmitry Khvostov	(Russia) Lokomotiv Kuban	26 June 2019	
G/F		(Poland) Mateusz Ponitka	(Russia) Lokomotiv Kuban	4 July 2019	
G/F		(Russia) Anton Ponkrashov	(Russia) UNICS Kazan	7 July 2019	
C		(Mexico) Gustavo Ayón	(Spain) Real Madrid	26 July 2019	

==== Out ====
Pos.	#	Player	Moving to	Date	Ref.
G/F	7	(Russia) Sergey Karasev	End of contract	31 May 2019	
C	10	(Russia) Andrey Desyatnikov	End of contract	4 July 2019	
PG	9	(Israel) Gal Mekel	End of contract	6 July 2019	

== Pre-seasons and friendlies ==
=== Matches ===
5 September 2019	Unicaja (Spain)	vs.	(Russia) Zenit Saint Petersburg	Málaga, Spain
20:00

6 September 2019	Real Madrid (Spain)	vs.	(Russia) Zenit Saint Petersburg	Málaga, Spain

12 September 2019	Betis (Spain)	vs.	(Russia) Zenit Saint Petersburg	Málaga, Spain

13 September 2019	TBA	vs.	(Russia) Zenit Saint Petersburg	Málaga, Spain

19 September 2019	Obras Sanitarias (Argentina)	vs.	(Russia) Zenit Saint Petersburg	Madrid, Spain

20 September 2019	TBA	vs.	(Russia) Zenit Saint Petersburg	Madrid, Spain

== Competitions ==
=== Overview ===
Competition	First match	Last match	Starting round	Record							
Competition	First match	Last match	Starting round	Pld	W	D	L	PF	PA	PD	Win %
VTB United League	1 October 2019		Round 1	0	0	0	0	0	0	+0	—
EuroLeague	4 October 2019		Round 1	0	0	0	0	0	0	+0	—
Total				0	0	0	0	0	0	+0	—

Source: Competitions

=== VTB United League ===
==== League table ====
Pos	Team	Pld	W	L	PF	PA	PD	PCT	Qualification
1	(Russia) CSKA Moscow	0	0	0	0	0	0	—	Advance to playoffs
2	(Russia) UNICS	0	0	0	0	0	0	—	Advance to playoffs
3	(Russia) Khimki	0	0	0	0	0	0	—	Advance to playoffs
4	(Russia) Lokomotiv Kuban	0	0	0	0	0	0	—	Advance to playoffs
5	(Russia) Zenit Saint Petersburg	0	0	0	0	0	0	—	Advance to playoffs
6	(Kazakhstan) Astana	0	0	0	0	0	0	—	Advance to playoffs
7	(Estonia) Kalev/Cramo	0	0	0	0	0	0	—	Advance to playoffs
8	(Russia) Nizhny Novgorod	0	0	0	0	0	0	—	Advance to playoffs
9	(Russia) Enisey	0	0	0	0	0	0	—	
10	(Russia) Avtodor Saratov	0	0	0	0	0	0	—	
11	(Poland) Zielona Góra	0	0	0	0	0	0	—	
12	(Russia) Parma	0	0	0	0	0	0	—	
13	(Belarus) Tsmoki Minsk	0	0	0	0	0	0	—	

Source: VTB United League

==== Matches ====
1 October 2019 1	Zielona Góra (Poland)	vs.	(Russia) Zenit Saint Petersburg	Zielona Góra, Poland
				Arena: CRS Hall Zielona Góra

7 October 2019 2	CSKA Moscow (Russia)	vs.	(Russia) Zenit Saint Petersburg	Moscow, Russia
				Arena: USC CSKA

13 October 2019 3	Zenit Saint Petersburg (Russia)	vs.	(Russia) Nizhny Novgorod	Saint Petersburg, Russia
				Arena: Sibur Arena

21 October 2019 4	Kalev (Estonia)	vs.	(Russia) Zenit Saint Petersburg	Tallinn, Estonia
				Arena: Saku Suurhall

27 October 2019 5	Zenit Saint Petersburg (Russia)	vs.	(Russia) Lokomotiv Kuban	Saint Petersburg, Russia
				Arena: Sibur Arena

4 November 2019 6	Astana (Kazakhstan)	vs.	(Russia) Zenit Saint Petersburg	Nur-Sultan, Kazakhstan
				Arena: Saryarka Velodrome

11 November 2019 7	Zenit Saint Petersburg (Russia)	vs.	(Russia) Enisey	Saint-Petersburg, Russia
				Arena: Sibur Arena

25 November 2019 8	UNICS (Russia)	vs.	(Russia) Zenit Saint Petersburg	Kazan, Russia
				Arena: Basket-Hall
