= Russia men's national basketball team =

National sports team

Russia
- FIBA ranking: NR (1 September 2026)
- Joined FIBA: 1992; 34 years ago
- FIBA zone: FIBA Europe
- National federation: RBF
- Coach: Zoran Lukić

Olympic Games
- Appearances: 3
- Medals: (bronze) Bronze: (2012)

FIBA World Cup
- Appearances: 5
- Medals: (silver) Silver: (1994, 1998)

EuroBasket
- Appearances: 13
- Medals: (gold) Gold: (2007); (silver) Silver: (1993); (bronze) Bronze: (1997, 2011)
Home	Away
Medal record
Olympic Games
Bronze medal – third place	2012 London	Team
FIBA World Cup
Silver medal – second place	1994 Canada
Silver medal – second place	1998 Greece
EuroBasket
Gold medal – first place	2007 Spain
Silver medal – second place	1993 Germany
Bronze medal – third place	1997 Spain
Bronze medal – third place	2011 Lithuania
Stanković Cup
Gold medal – first place	2014 Luoyang
Silver medal – second place	2011 Guangzhou
Bronze medal – third place	2011 Haining

The Russia men's national basketball team (Russian: национа́льная сбо́рная Росси́и по баскетболу, romanized: natsionalnaya sbornaya rossii po basketbolu) represents Russia in international basketball competition. They are organized and run by the Russian Basketball Federation (RBF). The team came into existence after the dissolution of the Soviet Union and its national team.

In the post-Soviet era, the Russia national team consisting of Soviet players under the guidance of Sergei Belov won the silver medal at EuroBasket 1993. It also won silver at the World Cup in consecutive appearances in 1994 and 1998.

However, Belov's departure saw Russia face multiple disappointments, until David Blatt took over as head coach. Under Blatt's guidance, the national team became champions at EuroBasket 2007, and also won bronze medals at EuroBasket 2011 and the 2012 Summer Olympics.

After Blatt left the staff in late 2012, Russian national basketball experienced a deep crisis due to corruption in the RBF, and the federation's conflict with FIBA. Following a failed performance at EuroBasket 2015, Russia did not qualify for the 2016 Summer Olympics. The situation stabilized after members of the RBF, including president Yulia Anikeeva, were dismissed. The current head coach is Zoran Lukić.

After the Russian invasion of Ukraine, FIBA banned Russian teams and officials from participating in FIBA basketball and FIBA 3x3 Basketball competitions.

== History ==
=== Early history (1992–2000) ===
The history of post-Soviet basketball in Russia dates back to 1992. The head coach back then was Yuri Selikhov. The first major tournament Russia participated in was the EuroBasket 1993 in Germany. The roster included players from the USSR era, among them were Sergey Bazarevich, and Dmitry Sukharev. Russia became runners-up, losing in the final to Germany, 70–71.

Sergey Belov was appointed new head coach of the national team after the EuroBasket. Russia debuted at the 1994 World Cup, reaching the final, losing only to the United States, 91–137. At the EuroBasket 1995, Russia displayed a very mediocre performance at the tournament, where the national team eventually finished up in 7th place, with an (5-4) record overall. Two years later Russia beat France 108–89, to claim the bronze medal. At the 1998 World Cup, Russia took home the silver medal.

The final tournament under the guidance of Belov was the EuroBasket 1999 in France. In the quarterfinals, the national team lost to Italy, and in the classification matches defeated Germany, but lost to Lithuania in the fifth-place match.

=== Decline (2000–2006) ===
Belov was replaced by Stanislav Eremin as the new head coach in the new century. Russia debuted at their first Summer Olympic Games, in Sydney, Australia, in 2000. Russia lost two matches in the preliminary round and got to the quarterfinals from the bottom of the group, losing there to USA, 85–70. In the classification rounds, Russia lost to Canada, 86–83, in double overtime, finishing the Games in 8th place. At the EuroBasket 2001, the Russians took the overall 5th place. In the preliminary round, Russia won two out of three matches, defeating Bosnia and Herzegovina, Greece but falling to Italy. Russia qualified to the quarterfinals as one of the top teams from their group, but lost to Spain, 62–55. Russia won both matches in the classification phase, defeating Latvia and France. At the 2002 World Cup in Indianapolis, Russia exhibited a lackluster outing during the competition and failed to medal, ending in 10th place.

In 2002, Sergey Elevich was named the new head coach until 2003, when he was replaced by Sergei Babkov, who also coached for two years. However, Russia played poorly during this time, producing no outstanding results.

=== Blatt era (2006–2012) ===
On 9 March 2006, the new head coach of the national team became American-Israeli David Blatt. The period under Blatt's guidance was marked by some great moments.

Russia won EuroBasket 2007, defeating the host nation Spain. In the first quarter of the final, the Russians were 10 points down, losing offensive and defensive rebounds and failing to counter Pau Gasol. The team also started the game cold from the three-point line. However, in the 4th quarter Russia came back. With a minute and a half remaining in regulation Spain led by five points, but then David Blatt took a timeout, and Russia decreased the gap. In the final three seconds J. R. Holden converted on a difficult shot and Russia took the lead by one point. Spain quickly called timeout one second later. Out of the timeout Spain immediately got the ball in to Gasol, for a potential game winner, but the shot was off the mark, and Russia prevailed 60–59. Andrey Kirilenko was named MVP of the tournament.

At the 2008 Olympics, in the first match they defeated Iran, but then lost to Croatia, Lithuania, Australia, and Argentina. In the group phase Russia took fifth and finished their performance. At EuroBasket 2009, Russia was without its leader Kirilenko and Holden for personal reasons, and Victor Khryapa due to injury. They were replaced by young players Fedor Dmitriev, Egor Vyaltsev, and Kelly McCarty. The Russians still managed to reach the quarterfinals, but were eventually eliminated by Serbia, to finish 7th in the tournament.

On 12 December 2009, Russia received a wild card for the 2010 World Cup. In the preliminary phase, Russia finished second in their group after victories over Puerto Rico, the Ivory Coast, and Greece, but failed to win against Turkey. In the round of 16, they defeated New Zealand, but finished their performance in the quarterfinals, losing to the Americans, 79–89. Russia as in the last EuroBasket finished 7th, after losing to Argentina and defeating Slovenia.

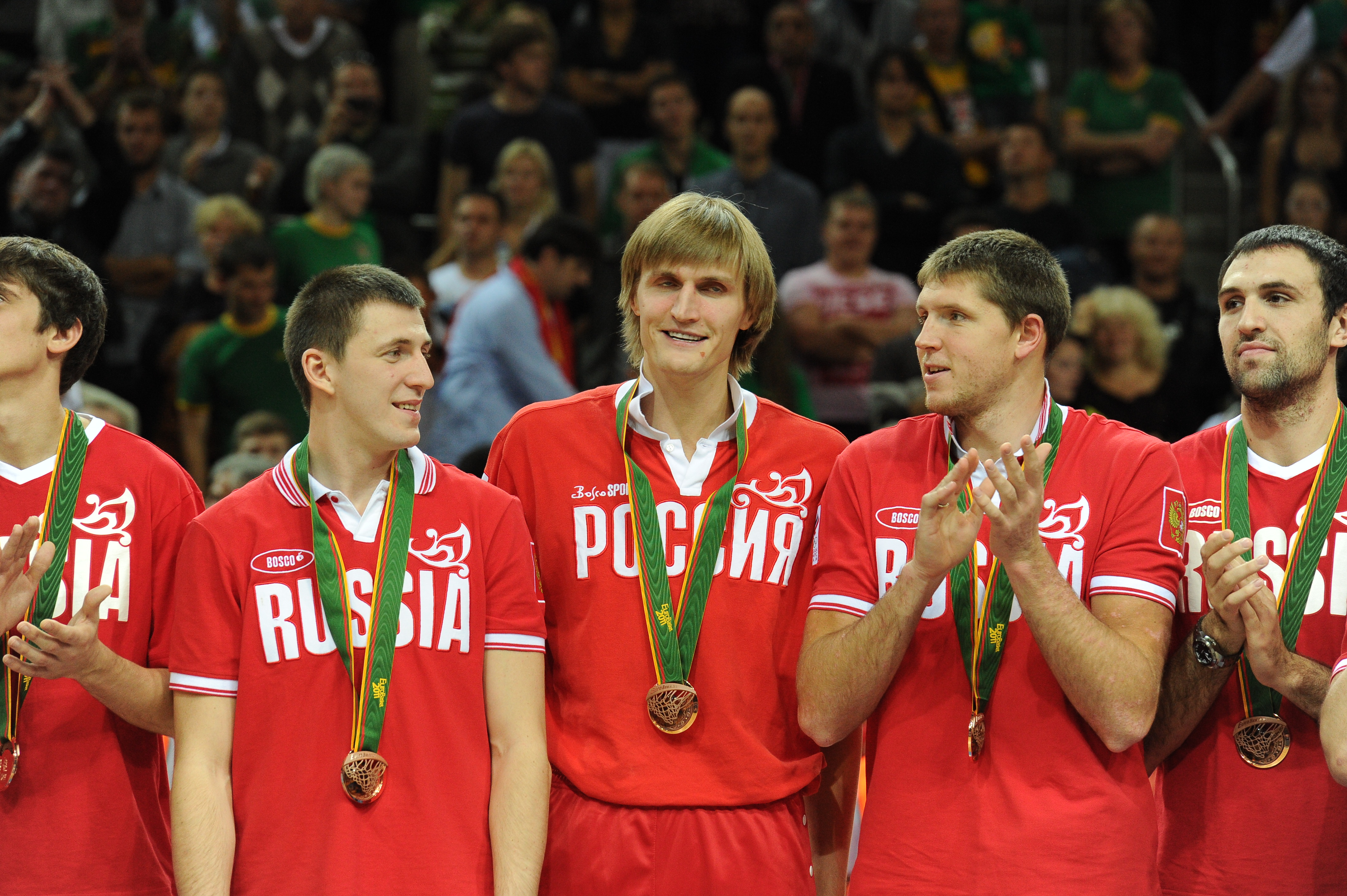
The bronze medalists of the EuroBasket 2011

Russia participated at the EuroBasket 2011, winning 10 of 11 matches. They failed to reach the final after losing to France. In the bronze medal game, Russia in a tight game subdued Macedonia. Kirilenko was named to the All-Tournament Team.

Notwithstanding their third place, Russia did not directly qualify for the 2012 Summer Olympics in London, but qualified instead through the qualifying tournament in Venezuela in early July 2012, where they did not lose a single match.

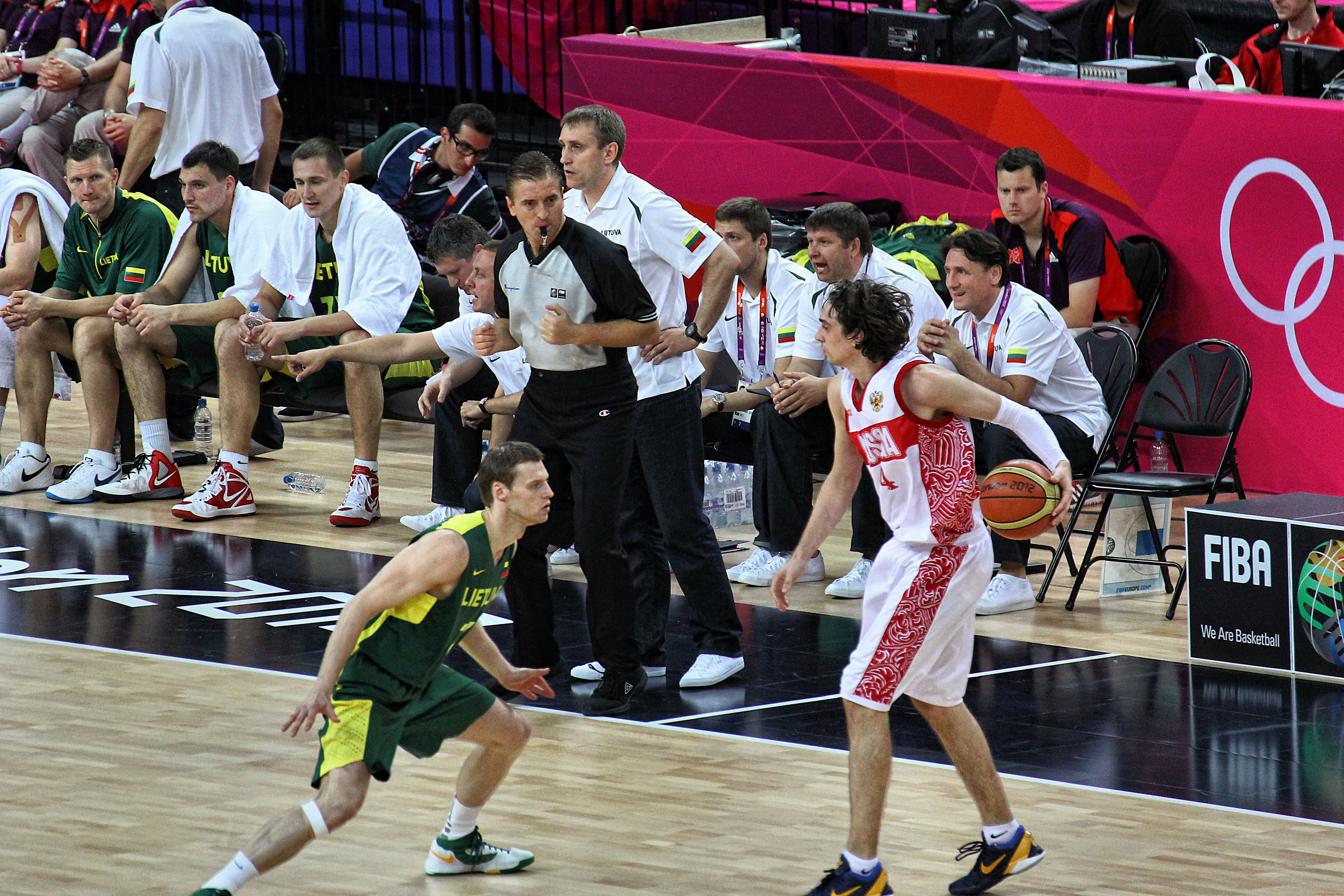
Quarterfinals match between Lithuania and Russia at 2012 Summer Olympics

At the 2012 Olympics, Russia took the top position in their preliminary phase group, losing only to Australia before advancing. In the quarterfinals Russia defeated Lithuania, but then lost to Spain, 59–67. In the third-place match, Russia defeated Argentina, the Olympic champions of 2004, 81–77. Kirilenko became member of the All-Olympics Team according to ESPN. He was ranked third in blocks and steals, sixth in scoring and eighth in rebounding.

We created a great team. It is one of the strongest in the world, it plays on the highest level. It took a lot of time to achieve this aim, we collected many talented players. The medals won at the Olympics created a new Russian history. In the seven years of cooperation with Andrey Kirilenko and other people we won three medals. Gold in EuroBasket 2007, bronze in the last year and this Olympic bronze.

— David Blatt

On 30 October 2012, Blatt decided to step down as head coach of the national team.

=== Corruption in the RBF and decline (2012–2016) ===
In late December a new head coach was chosen, Bilbao Basket coach Fotis Katsikaris. 19 July 2013, three days before the training for the upcoming EuroBasket 2013, he decided not to coach the national team. On the next day he published an open letter in which he explained his decision. He felt that his actions were met with opposition from the administration of the Russian Basketball Federation, especially from acting president Yulia Anikeeva (the future president of the RBF who was arrested in 2016 for corruption), and criticized the dismissal of general manager Oleg Ushakov.

Katsikaris was replaced by Vasily Karasev. Losing 4 out of 5 matches in the preliminary round against Italy, Greece, Sweden and Finland (only winning against Turkey). Team Russia finished in 24th place at the EuroBasket 2013, the worst result ever for the national team. Karasev was then replaced by Evgeny Pashutin on 29 November 2013.

A vast majority of its players declined participating in the EuroBasket 2015, including Timofey Mozgov, Sergey Karasev, Pavel Podkolzin, Alexey Shved, Evgeny Voronov, Artem Vikhrov, Evgeny Valiev, and Sergey Tokarev. Anton Ponkrashov and Egor Vyaltsev were initially dismissed from the national team, but then returned. FIBA in the last moment allowed team Russia to participate in spite of the disqualification of the RBF. Russia lost four matches in a row to Israel, Poland, Finland, and France (only winning against Bosnia), and so failed to qualify for the 2016 Olympics in Rio de Janeiro; they finished 17th. Pashutin resigned on 29 October 2015.

An executive committee of the RBF on 20 January 2016 named a new head coach, Sergey Bazarevich. Russia planned to prepare for the EuroBasket 2017, but FIBA suspended the RBF in July 2015. However, later their membership was restored in November 2015. Their disqualification was annulled in late May 2016, and in September 2016 team Russia qualified for the EuroBasket.

=== Return to European success; Ban (2016–) ===
At the EuroBasket 2017, Russia defeated four of their five opponents Turkey, Serbia, Belgium, and Great Britain in the preliminary round, losing only to Latvia before advancing. In the knockout stage Russia beat Croatia, and in the quarterfinals closely defeated Greece to reach the semifinals. Serbia though proved to be too tough this time around defeating Russia 87–79 to reach the final. The bronze medal match between Russia and Spain was won by Spain, 93–85.

After the Russian invasion of Ukraine, FIBA banned Russian teams and officials from participating in FIBA basketball and FIBA 3x3 Basketball competitions.

== Honours ==
=== Medals table (since 1992) ===
Games	Gold	Silver	Bronze	Total
Summer Olympics	0	0	1	1
FIBA World Cup	0	2	0	2
EuroBasket	1	1	2	4
Stanković Cup	1	1	1	3
Grand Totals	2	4	4	10

== Competitive record ==
=== FIBA World Cup ===
World Cup					Qualification		
Year	Position	Pld	W	L	Pld	W	L
1950 to 1990	Part of Soviet Union						
(Canada) 1994	2nd place, silver medalist(s)	8	6	2	Directly qualified		
(Greece) 1998	2nd place, silver medalist(s)	9	7	2	Directly qualified		
(United States) 2002	10th	8	3	5	Directly qualified		
(Japan) 2006	Did not qualify				Did not qualify		
(Turkey) 2010	7th	9	6	3	Wildcard		
(Spain) 2014	Did not qualify				Did not qualify		
(China) 2019	12th	5	3	2	12	8	4
(Philippines) (Japan) (Indonesia) 2023	Banned				Banned		
(Qatar) 2027	Banned				Banned		
(France) 2031	To be determined				To be determined		
Total	5/20	39	25	14	12	8	4

=== Olympic Games ===
Olympic Games					Qualifying		
Year	Position	Pld	W	L	Pld	W	L
1948 to 1992	Part of Soviet Union						
(United States) 1996	Did not qualify				Did not qualify		
(Australia) 2000	8th	7	3	4	Directly qualified		
(Greece) 2004	Did not qualify				Did not qualify		
(China) 2008	9th	5	1	4	Directly qualified		
(United Kingdom) 2012	3rd place, bronze medalist(s)	8	6	2	4	4	0
(Brazil) 2016	Did not qualify				Did not qualify		
(Japan) 2020	Did not qualify				2	0	2
(France) 2024	Banned				Banned		
(United States) 2028	Banned				Banned		
Total	3/20	20	10	10	6	4	2

=== FIBA Stanković Continental Champions' Cup ===
FIBA Stanković Continental Champions' Cup
Year	Position	Pld	W	L
(China) 2008	4th	3	0	3
(China) 2009	Did not participate			
(China) 2010	Did not participate			
(China) 2011 (1)	3rd place, bronze medalist(s)	4	3	1
(China) 2011 (2)	2nd place, silver medalist(s)	4	3	1
(China) 2012	4th	4	1	3
(China) 2013	Did not participate			
(China) 2014	1st place, gold medalist(s)	4	4	0
Total	1 Title	19	11	8

=== EuroBasket ===
EuroBasket					Qualification		
Year	Position	Pld	W	L	Pld	W	L
1947 to 1991	Part of Soviet Union						
(Germany) 1993	2nd place, silver medalist(s)	9	6	3	6	4	2
(Greece) 1995	7th	9	5	4	6	5	1
(Spain) 1997	3rd place, bronze medalist(s)	9	7	2	10	10	0
(France) 1999	6th	9	5	4	10	9	1
(Turkey) 2001	5th	6	4	2	Directly qualified		
(Sweden) 2003	8th	7	3	4	10	6	4
(Serbia and Montenegro) 2005	8th	6	2	4	4	3	1
(Spain) 2007	1st place, gold medalist(s)	9	8	1	6	5	1
(Poland) 2009	7th	9	5	4	Directly qualified		
(Lithuania) 2011	3rd place, bronze medalist(s)	11	10	1	Directly qualified		
(Slovenia) 2013	21st	5	1	4	Directly qualified		
(France) (Croatia) (Germany) (Latvia) 2015	17th	5	1	4	4	2	2
(Finland) (Israel) (Romania) (Turkey) 2017	4th	9	6	3	4	4	0
(Czech Republic) (Georgia (country)) (Germany) (Italy) 2022	Banned				6	4	2
(Latvia) (Cyprus) (Finland) (Poland) 2025	Banned				Banned		
(Estonia) (Greece) (Slovenia) (Spain) 2029	To be determined				To be determined		
Total	14/42	103	63	40	66	52	14

== Results and fixtures ==
=== 2021 ===
26 November 2021 2023 FIBA World Cup qualifiers – 1st round	Russia	Annulled	Italy
Note:

29 November 2021 2023 FIBA World Cup qualifiers – 1st round	Russia	Annulled	Iceland

=== 2022 ===
24 February 2022 2023 FIBA World Cup qualifiers – 1st round	Russia	Annulled	Netherlands
Note:

27 February 2022 2023 FIBA World Cup qualifiers – 1st round	Netherlands	Cancelled	Russia
Note: The game, originally scheduled for 27 February 2022, was postponed due to the Russian invasion of Ukraine.

1 July 2022 2023 FIBA World Cup qualifiers – 1st round	Italy	Cancelled	Russia
Note:

4 July 2022 2023 FIBA World Cup qualifiers – 1st round	Iceland	Cancelled	Russia

== Team ==
=== Current roster ===
Roster for the 2019 FIBA World Cup.

Russia national basketball team – 2019 FIBA Basketball World Cup roster
Players
Coaches

Pos.	No.	Name	Age – Date of birth	Height	Club	Ctr.
PG	2	Andrei Sopin	22 – 7 July 1997	1.86 m (6 ft 1 in)	MBA Moscow	(Russia)
SF	3	Sergey Karasev	25 – 26 October 1993	2.01 m (6 ft 7 in)	Zenit Saint Petersburg	(Russia)
SG	4	Evgeny Baburin	32 – 4 July 1987	1.90 m (6 ft 3 in)	Nizhny Novgorod	(Russia)
SG	6	Grigory Motovilov	21 – 7 February 1998	1.91 m (6 ft 3 in)	Spartak Primorye	(Russia)
SG	7	Vitaly Fridzon	33 – 14 October 1985	1.95 m (6 ft 5 in)	Lokomotiv Kuban	(Russia)
C	8	Vladimir Ivlev	29 – 28 February 1990	2.07 m (6 ft 9 in)	Lokomotiv Kuban	(Russia)
PF	11	Semyon Antonov	30 – 18 July 1989	2.02 m (6 ft 8 in)	CSKA Moscow	(Russia)
PF	12	Andrey Zubkov	26 – 29 June 1991	2.05 m (6 ft 9 in)	Khimki	(Russia)
C	20	Andrey Vorontsevich	30 – 17 July 1987	2.07 m (6 ft 9 in)	CSKA Moscow	(Russia)
PG	30	Mikhail Kulagin	25 – 4 August 1994	1.92 m (6 ft 4 in)	CSKA Moscow	(Russia)
PF	31	Evgeny Valiev	29 – 3 May 1990	2.05 m (6 ft 9 in)	Zenit Saint Petersburg	(Russia)
SF	41	Nikita Kurbanov	32 – 5 October 1986	2.02 m (6 ft 8 in)	CSKA Moscow	(Russia)

Head coach

- (Russia) Sergei Bazarevich

Assistant coach(es)

- (Serbia) Saša Grujić
- (Russia) Sergei Bykov
- (Russia) Denis Goldevsky

Legend

- (C) Team captain
- Club – describes last
  club before the tournament
- Age – describes age
  on 31 August 2019

=== Depth chart ===
Pos.	Starting 5	Bench 1	Bench 2
C	Andrey Zubkov	Vladimir Ivlev
PF	Andrey Vorontsevich	Semen Antonov	Evgeny Valiev
SF	Nikita Kurbanov	Sergey Karasev
SG	Vitaly Fridzon	Evgeny Baburin
PG	Mikhail Kulagin	Grigory Motovilov	Andrei Sopin

=== Notable players ===
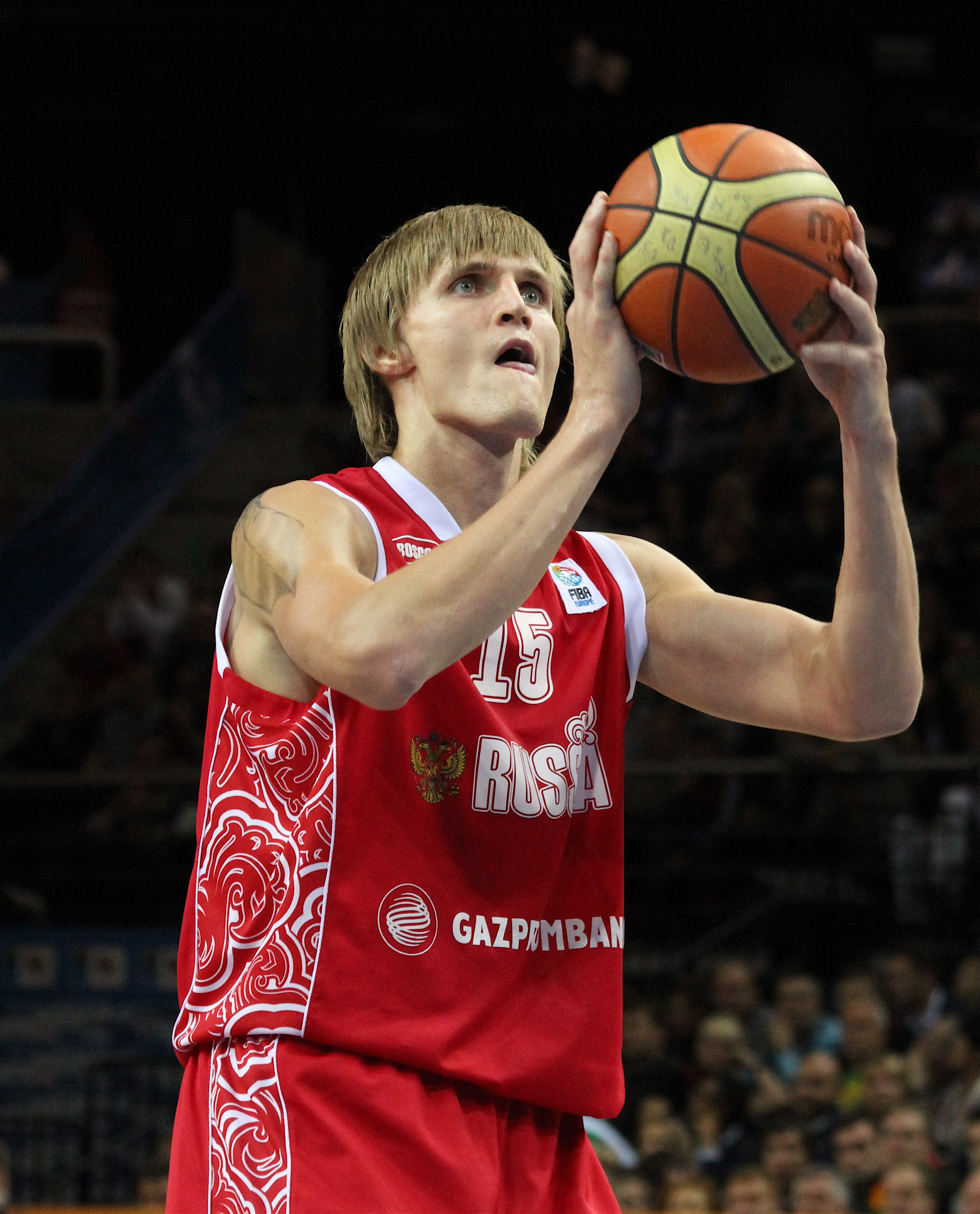
Andrei Kirilenko, former captain of Team Russia

- Sergei Panov: 2006 EuroLeague champion.
- J. R. Holden: EuroBasket 2007 champion.
- Andrei Kirilenko: Was the youngest European basketball player to be drafted, EuroBasket 2007 champion, and MVP; FIBA Europe Player of the Year in 2007. Flag bearer at 2008 Summer Olympics Opening Ceremony for Russia.
- Victor Khryapa: Portland Trail Blazers and Chicago Bulls (NBA), EuroBasket 2007 champion.

=== Head coach position ===
- (Russia) Yuri Selikhov – 1992–1993
- (Russia) Sergei Belov – 1993–2000
- (Russia) Stanislav Eremin – 1999–2002
- (Russia) Sergey Elevich – 2003–2004
- (Russia) Sergei Babkov – 2004–2005
- (United States) (Israel) David Blatt – 2006–2012
- (Greece) Fotis Katsikaris – 2012–2013
- (Russia) Vasiliy Karasev – 2013
- (Russia) Evgeny Pashutin – 2014–2015
- (Russia) Sergey Bazarevich – 2016–2021
- (Serbia) Zoran Lukić – 2021–present

=== Past rosters ===
1993 EuroBasket: finished 2nd (silver) among 16 teams

4 Vladimir Gorin, 5 Dmitry Shakulin, 6 Dmitry Sucharev, 7 Maksim Astanin, 8 Vitaly Nosov, 9 Sergei Bazarevich, 10 Sergei Babkov, 11 Mikhail Mikhailov, 12 Vasily Karasev, 13 Andrei Fetisov, 14 Sergei Panov, 15 Vladislav Kondratov (Coach: Yuri Selikhov)

1994 FIBA World Cup: finished 2nd (silver) among 16 teams

4 Sergei Bazarevich, 5 Sergei Babkov, 6 Evgeni Kisurin, 7 Mikhail Mikhailov, 8 Andrei Fetisov, 9 Dmitri Domani, 10 Sergei Panov, 11 Evgeni Pashutin, 12 Igor Grachev, 13 Sergei Ivanov, 14 Vasily Karasev, 15 Vitaly Nosov (Coach: Sergei Belov)

1995 EuroBasket: finished 7th among 14 teams

4 Vasily Karasev, 5 Igor Kudelin, 6 Dmitri Domani, 7 Evgeni Kisurin, 8 Evgeniy Pashutin, 9 Sergei Bazarevich, 10 Sergei Babkov, 11 Mikhail Mikhailov, 12 Andrei Fetisov, 13 Sergei Ivanov, 14 Sergei Panov, 15 Vitaly Nosov (Coach: Sergei Belov)

1997 EuroBasket: finished 3rd (bronze) among 16 teams

4 Vasily Karasev, 5 Igor Kudelin, 6 Igor Kurashov, 7 Evgeni Kisurin, 8 Evgeniy Pashutin, 9 Dmitry Shakulin, 10 Sergei Babkov, 11 Mikhail Mikhailov, 12 Zakhar Pashutin, 13 Andrei Fetisov, 14 Sergei Panov, 15 Vitaly Nosov (Coach: Sergei Belov)

1998 FIBA World Cup: finished 2nd (silver) among 16 teams

4 Vasily Karasev, 5 Igor Kudelin, 6 Zakhar Pashutin, 7 Evgeni Kisurin, 8 Dmitri Domani, 9 Valeri Tikhonenko, 10 Sergei Babkov, 11 Mikhail Mikhailov, 12 Nikita Morgunov, 13 Igor Kurashov, 14 Sergei Panov, 15 Vitaly Nosov (Coach: Sergei Belov)

1999 EuroBasket: finished 6th among 16 teams

4 Vasily Karasev, 5 Igor Kudelin, 6 Alexander Petrenko, 7 Evgeni Kisurin, 8 Evgeniy Pashutin, 9 Valeri Tikhonenko, 10 Sergei Babkov, 11 Igor Kurashov, 12 Zakhar Pashutin, 13 Ruslan Avleev, 14 Sergei Panov, 15 Vitaly Nosov (Coach: Sergei Belov)

2000 Olympic Games: finished 8th among 12 teams

4 Sergei Chikalkin, 5 Valentin Kubrakov, 6 Aleksandr Bashminov, 7 Evgeni Kisurin, 8 Nikita Morgunov, 9 Sergei Bazarevich, 10 Evgeniy Pashutin, 11 Zakhar Pashutin, 12 Andrei Fetisov, 13 Andrei Kirilenko, 14 Sergei Panov, 15 Ruslan Avleev (Coach: Stanislav Eremin)

2001 EuroBasket: finished 5th among 16 teams

4 Anton Ioudine, 5 Alexandre Bachminov, 6 Sergei Panov, 7 Igor Kudelin, 8 Sergei Chikalkin, 9 Nikita Morgunov, 10 Evgeniy Pashutin, 11 Zakhar Pashutin, 12 Alexander Miloserdov, 13 Andrei Kirilenko, 14 Aleksey Savrasenko, 15 Petr Samoylenko (Coach: Stanislav Eremin)

2002 FIBA World Cup: finished 10th among 16 teams

4 Vasily Karasev, 5 Aleksandr Bashminov, 6 Sergei Panov, 7 Igor Kudelin, 8 Sergei Chikalkin, 9 Nikita Morgunov, 10 Evgeniy Pashutin, 11 Zakhar Pashutin, 12 Victor Khryapa, 13 Andrei Kirilenko, 14 Ruslan Avleev, 15 Aleksey Savrasenko (Coach: Stanislav Eremin)

2003 EuroBasket: finished 8th among 16 teams

4 Vasily Karasev, 5 Denis Ershov, 6 Fedor Likholitov, 7 Mikhail Soloviev, 8 Valentin Kubrakov, 9 Petr Samoylenko, 10 Victor Khryapa, 11 Zakhar Pashutin, 12 Sergei Monia, 13 Andrei Kirilenko, 14 Dmitri Domani, 15 Aleksey Savrasenko (Coach: Sergei Elevich)

2005 EuroBasket: finished 8th among 16 teams

4 Anton Ponkrashov, 5 J.R. Holden, 6 Fedor Likholitov, 7 Vitaly Fridzon, 8 Nikita Morgunov, 9 Petr Samoylenko, 10 Victor Khryapa, 11 Zakhar Pashutin, 12 Sergei Monia, 13 Andrei Kirilenko, 14 Andrei Ivanov, 15 Aleksey Savrasenko (Coach: Sergei Babkov)

2007 EuroBasket: finished 1st (gold) among 16 teams

4 Nikita Shabalkin, 5 J.R. Holden, 6 Sergei Bykov, 7 Andrei Kirilenko (C) & (MVP), 8 Nikita Morgunov, 9 Petr Samoylenko, 10 Victor Khryapa, 11 Zakhar Pashutin, 12 Sergei Monia, 13 Anton Ponkrashov, 14 Aleksey Savrasenko, 15 Nikolay Padius (Coach: David Blatt)

2008 Olympic Games: finished 9th among 12 teams

4 Andrey Vorontsevich, 5 J.R. Holden, 6 Sergei Bykov, 7 Andrei Kirilenko (C), 8 Nikita Morgunov, 9 Petr Samoylenko, 10 Victor Khryapa, 11 Zakhar Pashutin, 12 Sergei Monia, 13 Vitaly Fridzon, 14 Aleksey Savrasenko, 15 Victor Keyru (Coach: David Blatt)

2009 EuroBasket: finished 7th among 16 teams

4 Andrey Vorontsevich, 5 Nikita Kurbanov, 6 Sergei Bykov, 7 Vitaly Fridzon, 8 Kelly McCarty, 9 Dmitri Sokolov, 10 Fedor Dmitriev, 11 Egor Vyaltsev, 12 Sergei Monia, 13 Anton Ponkrashov, 14 Aleksei Zozulin, 15 Timofey Mozgov (Coach: David Blatt)

2010 FIBA World Cup: finished 7th among 24 teams

4 Andrey Vorontsevich, 5 Evgeny Kolesnikov, 6 Sergei Bykov, 7 Vitaly Fridzon, 8 Alexander Kaun, 9 Alexey Zhukanenko, 10 Victor Khryapa, 11 Anton Ponkrashov, 12 Sergei Monia, 13 Dmitry Khvostov, 14 Evgeny Voronov, 15 Timofey Mozgov (Coach: David Blatt)

2011 EuroBasket: finished 3rd (bronze) among 24 teams

4 Andrey Vorontsevich, 5 Timofey Mozgov, 6 Sergei Bykov, 7 Vitaly Fridzon, 8 Alexey Shved, 9 Nikita Shabalkin, 10 Victor Khryapa, 11 Semyon Antonov, 12 Sergei Monia, 13 Dmitry Khvostov, 14 Anton Ponkrashov, 15 Andrei Kirilenko (Coach: David Blatt)

2012 Olympic Games: finished 3rd (bronze) among 12 teams

4 Alexey Shved, 5 Timofey Mozgov, 6 Sergey Karasev, 7 Vitaly Fridzon, 8 Alexander Kaun, 9 Evgeny Voronov, 10 Victor Khryapa, 11 Semyon Antonov, 12 Sergei Monia, 13 Dmitry Khvostov, 14 Anton Ponkrashov, 15 Andrei Kirilenko (Coach: David Blatt)

2013 EuroBasket: finished 21st among 24 teams

4 Sergey Karasev, 5 Dmitri Sokolov, 6 Evgeny Valiev, 7 Vitaly Fridzon, 8 Evgeny Voronov, 9 Dmitry Kulagin, 10 Alexey Shved, 11 Semyon Antonov, 12 Sergei Monia, 13 Dmitry Khvostov, 14 Aleksey Savrasenko, 15 Anton Ponkrashov (Coach: Vasily Karasev)

2015 EuroBasket: finished 17th among 24 teams

1 Andrey Zubkov, 4 Evgeny Baburin, 5 Ruslan Pateev, 7 Vitaly Fridzon, 9 Egor Vyaltsev, 11 Semyon Antonov, 12 Sergei Monia, 13 Dmitry Khvostov, 14 Anton Ponkrashov (C), 20 Andrey Vorontsevich, 32 Andrey Desyatnikov, 41 Nikita Kurbanov (Coach: Evgeniy Pashutin)

2017 EuroBasket: finished 4th among 24 teams

1 Alexey Shved, 4 Evgeny Baburin, 7 Vitaly Fridzon, 8 Vladimir Ivlev, 11 Semyon Antonov, 12 Andrey Zubkov, 13 Dmitry Khvostov, 15 Timofey Mozgov, 20 Andrey Vorontsevich, 22 Dmitry Kulagin, 30 Mikhail Kulagin, 41 Nikita Kurbanov (Coach: Sergei Bazarevich)

2019 FIBA World Cup: finished 12th among 32 teams

2 Andrei Sopin, 3 Sergey Karasev, 4 Evgeny Baburin, 6 Grigory Motovilov, 7 Vitaly Fridzon, 8 Vladimir Ivlev, 11 Semyon Antonov, 12 Andrey Zubkov, 20 Andrey Vorontsevich, 30 Mikhail Kulagin, 31 Evgeny Valiev, 41 Nikita Kurbanov (Coach: Sergei Bazarevich)

== Kit ==
=== Manufacturer ===
1993–2015: Reebok
2015–March 1, 2022: Adidas (deal suspended by Adidas in response to the Russian invasion of Ukraine)

=== Sponsor ===
2015–present: Norilsk Nickel

== See also ==
- Sport in Russia
- Russia women's national basketball team
- Russia national under-19 basketball team
- Russia national under-17 basketball team
- Russia men's national 3x3 team
- Soviet Union national basketball team
