= Ramil =

Ramil (Cyrillic: Рамиль) is an Asian masculine given name and an occasional surname. It may refer to

Given name

- Ray Arcel (born Ramil Arcel; 1899–1994), American boxing trainer
- Ramil Aritkulov (born 1978), Russian middle-distance runner
- Ramil Gallego (born 1966), Filipino pool player
- Ramil Ganiyev (born 1968), Uzbekistani decathlete
- Ramil Gasimov (born 1981), Azerbaijani paralympic judoka
- Ramil Guliyev (born 1990), Azerbaijani-Turkish sprinter
- Ramil Hasanov (born 1996), Ukrainian football striker
- Ramil Kharisov (born 1977), Russian football player
- Ramil Khayrulin (born 1985), Russian film producer, filmmaker and screenwriter
- Ramil Rodriguez (1944–2014), Filipino actor
- Ramil Safarov (born 1977), Azerbaijani military officer
- Ramil Sarkulov (born 1981), Uzbekistani ice dancer
- Ramil Sheriff (born 1993), Jamaican football midfielder
- Ramil Sheydayev (born 1996), Russian-Azerbaijani footballer
- Ramil Usubov (born 1948), Minister of Internal Affairs of Azerbaijan
- Ramil Valeyev (born 1973), Russian football coach and former player
- Ramil Yuldashev (born 1961), Ukrainian ice hockey winger
- Ramil Zaripov (born 1992), Russian football defender

Surname

- Kleiton & Kledir (brothers Kleiton Ramil and Kledir Ramil), Brazilian singers and songwriters
- Manuel Ramil (born 1978), Spanish keyboardist for the Power metal band WarCry
- Mario R. Ramil (1946–2017), Associate Justice of the Hawaii State Supreme Court
- Vitor Ramil (born 1962), Brazilian musician, singer, composer and writer

== See also ==
- Typhoon Ramil in the Western Pacific
