= Valeyev =

Valeyev or Valeev (Cyrillic: Валеев) is a Tatar masculine surname closely related to Valiyev, its feminine counterpart is Valeyeva or Valeeva. Notable people with the surname include:

- Alisher Valeyev (born 1998), Russian rapper known as Morgenshtern
- Ernest Valeev (born 1950), Russian politician
- Igor Valeev (born 1981), Russian ice hockey player
- Natalia Valeeva (born 1969), Italian archer
- Ramil Valeyev (born 1973), Russian footballer and manager
- Rinar Valeyev (born 1987), Ukrainian footballer
- Ruslan Valeyev (born 1981), Ukrainian footballer
- Zilya Valeeva (born 1952), Russian Tatar politician
- Zukhra Valeeva (born 1947), Russian master builder
