= Valiyev =

Valiyev or Valiev (masculine, Azerbaijani: Vəliyev, Cyrillic: Валиев) and Valiyeva or Valieva (feminine, Azerbaijani: Vəliyeva, Cyrillic: Валиева) is an Azerbaijani and Tatar surname, meaning "son of Vali". It is closely related to Valeyev. Notable people with the surname include:

- Arif Valiyev (1943–2014), Azerbaijani politician
- Elmar Valiyev, Azerbaijani politician
- Evgeny Valiev (born 1990), Russian basketball player
- Kamila Valieva (born 2006), Russian figure skater
- Lamiya Valiyeva (born 2002), Azerbaijani Paralympic athlete
- Mirabi Valiyev (born 1970), Ukrainian sport wrestler
- Ravil Valiyev (born 1966), Russian footballer
- Rinat Valiev (born 1995), Russian ice hockey defenceman
- Roman Valiyev (born 1984), Kazakhstani triple jumper
- Suleyman Valiyev (1916–1996), Azerbaijani writer
- Timur Valiev (born 1990), Russian mixed martial artist
- Zinyat Valiyeva (born 1974), Azerbaijani paralympic archer
