= Vladimir Ivlev =

Russian basketball player

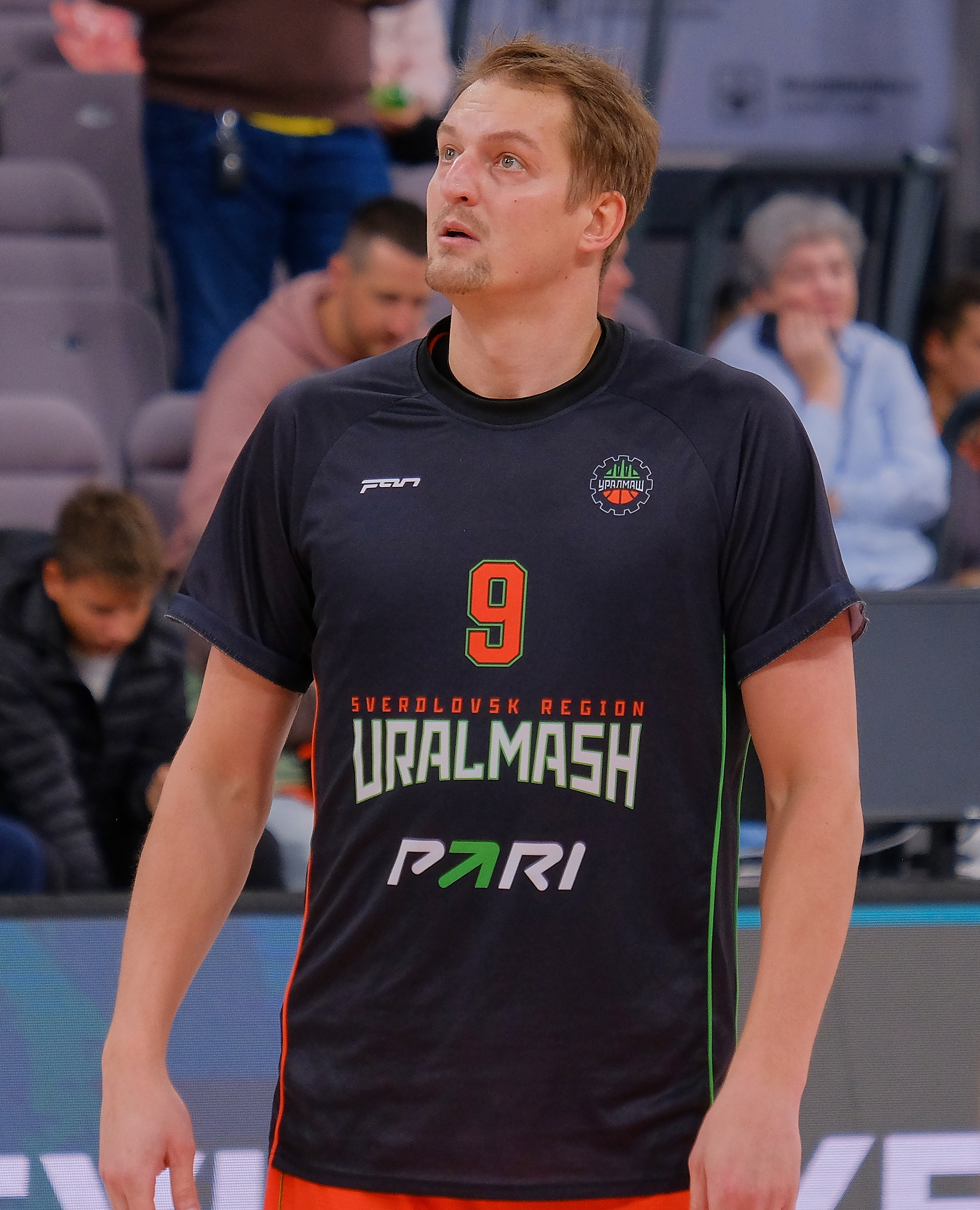

Personal information
- Born: 28 February 1990 (age 36) Moscow, Russian SFSR, Soviet Union
- Listed height: 2.07 m (6 ft 9 in)
- Listed weight: 102 kg (225 lb)

Career information
- Playing career: 2009–2026
- Position: Center

Career history
- 2009–2011: Dynamo Moscow
- 2011–2016: Nizhny Novgorod
- 2011–2012: → BC Ryazan
- 2016–2020: Lokomotiv Kuban
- 2020–2021: Parma
- 2021–2022: CSKA Moscow
- 2023: BC Samara
- 2023–2024: Nizhny Novgorod
- 2025–2026: Uralmash

Vladimir Sergeyvich Ivlev (Russian: Владимир Сергеевич Ивлев; born 28 February 1990) is a Russian former professional basketball player. He also represented the senior Russian national team.

== Professional career ==
After playing junior level basketball with the youth teams of Dynamo Moscow, Ivlev played with the reserve team of Dynamo Moscow (Dynamo Moscow 2), during the 2007–08 season. In the 2009–10 season, he made his debut with the senior men's team of Dynamo Moscow. In 2011, he joined BC Ryazan, and in 2012, he moved to Nizhny Novgorod. In 2016, he moved to Lokomotiv Kuban, where he spent four seasons, before moving to Parma Basket Perm for the 2020–21 season. On 13 July 2021 he signed with team CSKA Moscow, which competed in the EuroLeague until it was suspended due to the 2022 Russian invasion of Ukraine.

== Russian national team ==
Ivlev was a member of the Russian junior national teams. With Russia's junior national teams, he played at the 2007 FIBA Europe Under-18 Championship, the 2009 FIBA Europe Under-20 Championship, and the 2010 FIBA Europe Under-20 Championship.

He has also been a member of the senior Russian national basketball team. With Russia's senior team, he played at the EuroBasket 2017.
