= Russian Gold Basket awards =

The Russian Gold Basket awards were given annually out by the Russian Basketball Federation (RBF) from 2004 to 2009.

== Russian Gold Basket winners ==
Year	2004	2005	2006	2007	2008	2009
Russian Male Basketball Player of the Year	(Russia) Andrei Kirilenko	(Russia) Andrei Kirilenko	(Russia) Alexander Petrenko (posthumously)	(Russia) Andrei Kirilenko	(Russia) Andrei Kirilenko	(Russia) Victor Khryapa
Russian Female Basketball Player of the Year	(Russia) Ilona Korstin	(Russia) Maria Stepanova	(Russia) Maria Stepanova	(Russia) Maria Stepanova	(Russia) Tatiana Schegoleva	(Russia) Svetlana Abrosimova
Russian Men's Super League A Player of the Year	(United States) Marcus Brown	(Greece) Theo Papaloukas	(Greece) Theo Papaloukas	(Greece) Theo Papaloukas	(United States) Trajan Langdon	(Lithuania) Ramūnas Šiškauskas
Russian Women's Super League A Player of the Year	N/A	(United States) Yolanda Griffith	(Spain) Amaya Valdemoro	(United States) Diana Taurasi	(United States) Diana Taurasi	(United States) Diana Taurasi
Russian Best Young Male Basketball Player	(Russia) Dmitry Sokolov	(Russia) Vitaly Fridzon	(Russia) Nikita Kurbanov	(Russia) Andrey Vorontsevich	(Russia) Alexey Shved	(Russia) Dmitry Khvostov
Russian Best Young Female Basketball Player	(Russia) Marina Karpunina	(Russia) Marina Kuzina	(Russia) Elena Danilochkina	(Russia) Natalia Vieru	(Russia) Natalia Vieru	(Russia) Natalia Vieru
Russian Men's Basketball Coach of the Year	(Russia) Stanislav Eremin	(Russia) Stanislav Eremin	(Russia) Stanislav Eremin	(Russia) Stanislav Eremin	(Russia) Evgeniy Pashutin	(Russia) Evgeniy Pashutin
Russian Women's Basketball Coach of the Year	(Russia) Vadim Kapranov	(Russia) Igor Grudin	(Russia) Igor Grudin	(Russia) Igor Grudin	(Russia) Igor Grudin	(Russia) Boris Sokolovsky
Russian Men's Super League A Coach of the Year	(Serbia) Dušan Ivković	(United States) / (Israel) David Blatt	(Italy) Ettore Messina	(Italy) Ettore Messina	(Italy) Ettore Messina	(Italy) Ettore Messina
For their Contribution to the Development of Russian Basketball	(Russia) Alexander Gomelsky	(Russia) Yevgeny Bogachev	(Russia) Boris Gromov	(Russia) Vladimir Kondrashin (posthumously)	(Russia) Evgeny Gomelsky	(Russia) David Berlin
Best Russian team management	(Russia) CSKA Moscow	(Russia) Russian Basketball Federation	(Russia) CSKA Moscow	(Russia) Russian Basketball Federation & (Russia) Russian senior men's national team	(Russia) CSKA Moscow	(Russia) CSKA Moscow
Best Media Coverage of the Sport of Russian Basketball	Russia-2	Russia-2	Russia-2	Russia-2	Russia-2	Russia-2

== See also ==
- Russian Professional League Awards
- Russian Super League A
- Russian Women's Super League A
- Russian national basketball team
- Russian women's national basketball team
