= Evgeny Voronov =

Russian basketball player

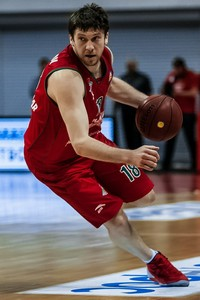
- Voronov in April 2015

No. 18 – MBA Moscow
- Position: Shooting guard
- League: VTB United League

Personal information
- Born: May 7, 1986 (age 40) Stavropol Krai, Soviet Union
- Listed height: 6 ft 4 in (1.93 m)
- Listed weight: 209 lb (95 kg)

Career information
- NBA draft: 2008: undrafted
- Playing career: 2005–present

Career history
- 2005–2006: Lokomotiv Rostov
- 2006–2008: CSK VVS Samara
- 2008–2009: UNICS Kazan
- 2009–2010: Krasnye Krylya Samara
- 2010–2011: Dynamo Moscow
- 2011–2014: CSKA Moscow
- 2014: Triumph Lyubertsy
- 2014–2016: Lokomotiv Kuban
- 2016–2017: UNICS Kazan
- 2017–2020: Zenit Saint Petersburg
- 2020–2021: Khimki
- 2021–2022: Parma Basket
- 2022–present: MBA Moscow

Career highlights
- 2× Russian League champion (2012, 2013); 2× VTB League champion (2012, 2013); Russian Cup winner (2009)
Medals
Men's basketball
Representing Russia
Olympic Games
Bronze medal – third place	2012 London	Men's basketball

Evgeny Sergeyevich Voronov (Russian: Евгений Сергеевич Воронов, born May 7, 1986) is a Russian professional basketball player for MBA Moscow of the VTB United League. He is also a member of the Russian national basketball team. He is 1.93 m (6 ft 4 in) in height and plays as a shooting guard.

== Professional career ==
Voronov has played with various teams in the Russian Basketball Super League since beginning his professional career in 2005. In 2006–07, he was a member of EuroCup Challenge winners CSK VVS Samara. While playing with Krasnye Krylya Samara, he averaged 7.1 points per game in 23 league games.

On January 24, 2014, he signed with Triumph Lyubertsy for the rest of the 2013–14 season. On June 12, 2014, he signed a 2+1 deal with Lokomotiv Kuban Krasnodar.

On July 2, 2016, he signed a 1+1 contract with UNICS Kazan. After one season, he left UNICS. On July 5, 2017, he signed with Zenit Saint Petersburg. After averaging 10.8 points and 2.6 rebounds per game in the 2017–18 season, Voronov re-signed with the team on September 7, 2018. On July 17, 2020, Voronov signed with Khimki.

On July 27, 2021, he signed with Parma Basket of the VTB United League.

== Russian national team ==
Voronov is also a member of the senior Russian national basketball team. He competed with the team for the first time at the 2010 FIBA World Championship after previously making appearances with the junior national team, including helping the team to a gold medal at the 2005 FIBA Europe Under-20 Championship. He was part of the Russian team that won the bronze medal at the 2012 Summer Olympics.
