= Zakhar Pashutin =

Russian basketball player and coach

Parma Basket
- Title: Assistant coach
- League: VTB United League

Personal information
- Born: 3 May 1974 (age 52) Sochi, Russian SFSR, Soviet Union
- Listed height: 1.96 m (6 ft 5 in)
- Listed weight: 210 lb (95 kg)

Career information
- NBA draft: 1996: undrafted
- Playing career: 1990–2012
- Position: Shooting guard
- Coaching career: 2012–present

Career history

Playing
- 1990–1995: Spartak St. Petersburg
- 1995–1999: Avtodor Saratov
- 1999–2000: Pınar Karşıyaka
- 2000–2001: ASVEL
- 2001–2003: CSKA Moscow
- 2003–2004: Ural Great Perm
- 2004–2008: CSKA Moscow
- 2008–2010: Spartak St. Petersburg
- 2010–2012: UNICS Kazan

Coaching
- 2012–2014: Lokomotiv Kuban Krasnodar (assistant)
- 2014–2015: Russia (assistant)
- 2018–2020: Spartak St. Petersburg
- 2020–2022: Lokomotiv Kuban Krasnodar 2
- 2022–present: Parma Basket (assistant)

Career highlights
- 2× EuroLeague champion (2006, 2008); EuroCup champion (2011); CIS Unified champion (1992); 5× Russian League champion (2003, 2005–2008); 4× Russian Cup winner (2004–2007); French Cup winner (2001); 3x Russian Basketball All-Star Game (1995, 1997, 1999)
Medals
Men's basketball
Representing Russia
FIBA World Cup
Silver medal – second place	1998 Greece
FIBA EuroBasket
Bronze medal – third place	1997 Spain
Gold medal – first place	2007 Spain
Representing CIS
European U-18 Championship
Bronze medal – third place	1992 Hungary	Under-18 Team

Zakhar Yuryevich Pashutin (Russian: Захар Юрьевич Пашутин; born May 3, 1974, in Sochi, USSR) is a retired Russian professional basketball player and basketball coach. At a height of 1.96 m (6 ft 5 in), and a weight of 95 kg (209 lb), he played as a shooting guard. He was also a member of the senior Russian national team, from 1996 to 2008. He is assistant coach for Parma Basket of the VTB United League.

== Professional career ==
Pashutin played professionally with the following clubs: Spartak St. Petersburg, Avtodor Saratov, Pınar Karşıyaka, ASVEL, CSKA Moscow, Ural Great Perm, and UNICS Kazan.

== National team career ==
Pashutin was also a member of the senior Russian national basketball team. With Russia's senior team, he played at the following tournaments: the 1997 EuroBasket, the 1998 FIBA World Championship, the 1999 EuroBasket, the 2001 EuroBasket, the 2002 FIBA World Championship, the 2005 EuroBasket, the 2007 EuroBasket, and the 2008 Summer Olympic Games.

He won the bronze medal at the 1997 EuroBasket, the silver medal at the 1998 FIBA World Championship, and the gold medal at the 2007 EuroBasket.

== Career statistics ==
Legend
GP	Games played	GS	Games started	MPG	Minutes per game
FG%	Field-goal percentage	3P%	3-point field-goal percentage	FT%	Free-throw percentage
RPG	Rebounds per game	APG	Assists per game	SPG	Steals per game
BPG	Blocks per game	PPG	Points per game	PIR	Performance index rating
**Bold**	Career high

=== EuroLeague ===
†	Denotes season in which Pashutin won the EuroLeague

Year	Team	GP	GS	MPG	FG%	3P%	FT%	RPG	APG	SPG	BPG	PPG	PIR
2001–02	CSKA Moscow	**20**	**13**	**29.8**	.466	.339	.544	**4.3**	**2.1**	**1.7**	**.2**	**10.7**	**10.5**
2002–03	CSKA Moscow	17	1	11.9	.395	.333	.700	1.3	.8	.6	—	2.7	1.8
2004–05	CSKA Moscow	17	0	7.7	**.467**	**.400**	.375	1.1	.5	.2	—	2.2	1.8
2005–06	CSKA Moscow	14	2	9.2	.364	.154	.667	1.6	.9	.6	.1	2.1	3.2
2006–07	CSKA Moscow	16	0	5.3	.368	.357	**.750**	.5	.5	.3	.1	1.4	1.3
2007–08†	CSKA Moscow	7	0	8.9	.429	.200	.000	1.4	.6	.7	.1	1.9	1.6
2011–12	UNICS	12	0	5.6	.385	**.400**	—	.8	.3	.3	.1	1.0	0.3
Career		103	16	12.4	.436	.325	.558	1.7	.9	.7	.1	3.6	3.4

== Coaching career ==
After he retired from playing professional basketball, Pashutin became a basketball coach.

== Personal life ==
Pashutin's older brother, Evgeniy, is also a former professional basketball player and a basketball coach.
