= Evgeny Baburin =

Russian basketball player

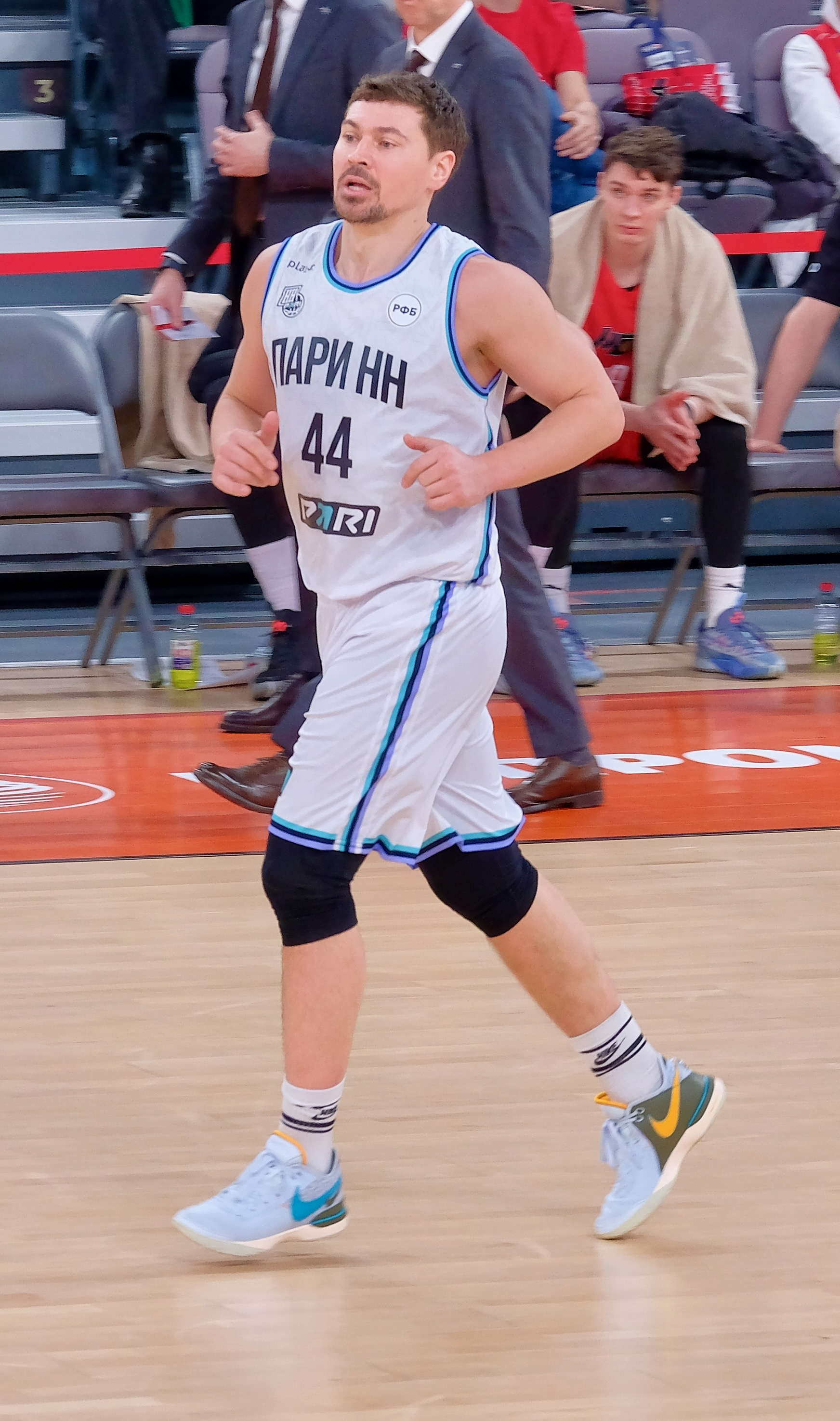

No. 44 – BC Nizhny Novgorod
- Position: Shooting guard
- League: VTB United League

Personal information
- Born: July 4, 1987 (age 39) Gorkiy, Russian SFSR, Soviet Union
- Listed height: 1.90 m (6 ft 3 in)
- Listed weight: 95 kg (209 lb)

Career history
- 2005–2008: Nizhny Novgorod
- 2008–2010: Temp-SUMZ
- 2010–2012: Spartak Primorye
- 2012–2016: Nizhny Novgorod
- 2016–2018: Lokomotiv Kuban
- 2018–present: Nizhny Novgorod

Career highlights
- VTB United League Defensive Player of the Year (2023)

Evgeny Eduardovich Baburin (alternate spelling: Evgenii) (Russian: Евгений Эдуардович Бабурин; born July 4, 1987) is a Russian professional basketball player for Nizhny Novgorod of the VTB United League. He also represents the senior Russian national basketball team.

== Professional career ==
In 2012, he returned to Nizhny Novgorod. In 2016, he moved to the Russian club Lokomotiv Kuban Krasnodar.

== Russian national team ==
Baburin has been a member of the senior Russia national basketball team. With Russia's senior national team, he played at the EuroBasket 2015, and at the EuroBasket 2017.
