= Zoran Lukić (basketball) =

Serbian basketball coach

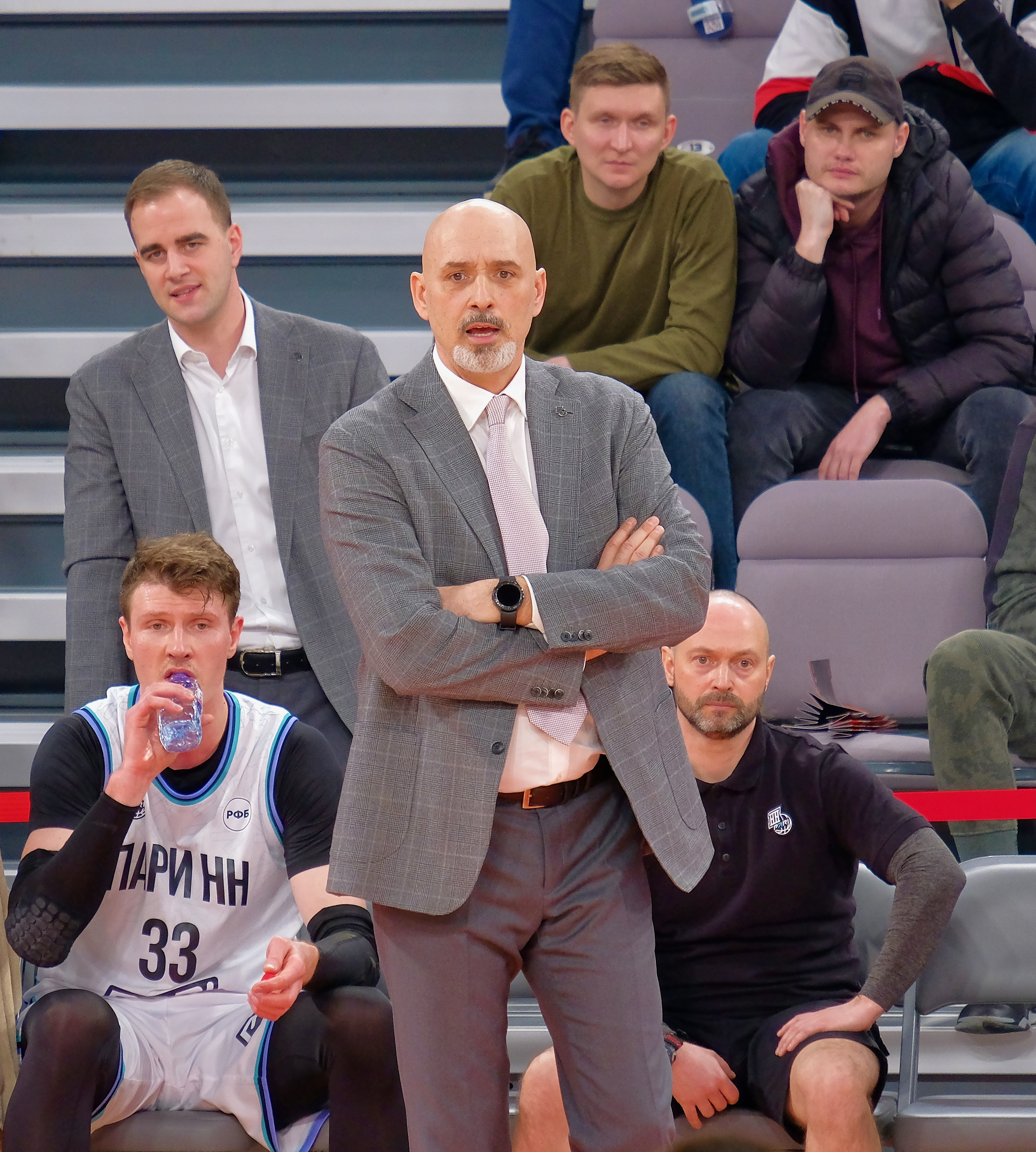
- Lukić in March 2024

Iraklis Thessaloniki
- Position: Head coach
- League: Greek Basketball League; FIBA Europe Cup

Personal information
- Born: 7 September 1971 (age 55) Belgrade, SR Serbia, SFR Yugoslavia

Career information
- Coaching career: 1995–present

Career history

Coaching
- 1995–2004: Atlas (assistant)
- 2006: India
- 2006–2008: CSKA Moscow 2
- 2008–2014: Nizhny Novgorod
- 2014–2015: Banvit
- 2017–2024: Nizhny Novgorod
- 2021–present: Russia
- 2025–present: Iraklis Thessaloniki

Career highlights
- FIBA Champions League Best Coach (2021); Russian Cup winner (2023)

Zoran Lukić (Serbian Cyrillic: Зоран Лукић; born 7 September 1971) is a Serbian professional basketball coach. He is currently the head coach of the Russian national team, as well as Iraklis Thessaloniki of the Greek Basketball League (GBL) and the FIBA Europe Cup.

== Coaching career ==
Lukić started his coaching career in 1995 when he joined the coaching staff of Serbian team Beopetrol (later renamed to Atlas). He worked there as an assistant coach under Zoran Krečković, Slobodan Klipa, Predrag Badnjarević, and Zoran Slavnić.

In August 2006, Lukić came to Russia, becoming the head coach for CSKA Moscow 2, a youth system of CSKA Moscow.

=== Nizhny Novgorod (2008–2014) ===
In September 2008, Nizhny Novgorod and its general manager Panov hired Lukić as their new head coach. In his second season (2009–10) as the head coach of Nizhny, he won the 2nd-tier Russian SuperLeague B, and got promoted to the Russian Professional League for the 2010–11 season. On 16 March 2011, Lukić and Nizhny had an 80–53 loss to Spartak Saint Petersburg in the Russian Cup Final. In June 2011, Lukić signed a two-year contract extension with Nizhny Novgorod.

On 30 June 2014, Lukić terminated his contract with Nizhny Novgorod on mutual agreement.

=== Banvit (2014–2015) ===
On 4 July 2014, Turkish team Banvit hired Lukić as their new head coach. On 18 January 2015, Lukić was the head coach for Team Asia at the Turkish League All-Star Game. On 18 February 2015, his team had a 89–64 loss to Pınar Karşıyaka in the 2014–15 Turkish Cup Quarterfinal. On the next day, he parted ways with Banavit following the loss in the Turkish Cup Quarterfinal. He finished his term with a 10–6 record in the Turkish League and with a 10–6 record in EuroCup.

=== Nizhny Novgorod (2017–present) ===
In March 2017, Lukić returned to Nizhny Novgorod as a sports director. In April 2017, he became their new head coach, succeeding Artūrs Štālbergs.

== National team coaching career ==
In 2006, Lukić was the head coach of the India national team.

Lukić was an assistant coach of the Russia national U16 team at the 2008 FIBA Europe Under-16 Championship in Chieti, Italy.

In October 2021, the Russian Basketball Federation hired Lukić as new head coach for the Russian national team.
