= Dmitri Domani =

Russian basketball player

Personal information
- Born: 27 September 1974 (age 52) Moscow, Russian SFSR, Soviet Union
- Listed height: 6 ft 6.7 in (2.00 m)
- Listed weight: 215 lb (98 kg)

Career information
- College: Saint Joseph's (1993–1997)
- NBA draft: 1997: undrafted
- Playing career: 1997–2012
- Position: Small forward

Career history
- 1997–2002: CSKA Moscow
- 2002–2011: Dynamo Moscow
- 2011–2012: Krasnye Krylya
Medals
Representing Russia
Men's Basketball
FIBA World Cup
Silver medal – second place	1994 Canada	National team
Silver medal – second place	1998 Greece	National team
Representing CIS
European U-18 Championship
Bronze medal – third place	1992 Hungary	U-18 Team

Dmitri Viacheslavovich Domani (Russian: Дмитрий Вячеславович Домани; born 27 September 1974) is a Russian professional basketball official and a former player. He is 2.00 m tall and he weighs 98 kg. H formerly played for Saint Joseph's University.

== Post-playing career and fraud conviction ==
From 2013 to 2015 he served as an executive director of the Russian Basketball Federation and a general manager of the Russia men's national basketball team.

In August 2015, Andrei Kirilenko was elected as the president of the federation and ordered a financial audit of their budget. As a consequence of that audit, Domani was charged with fraud. According to the first charge, the federation was paying for events and banquets in their office that were not actually held (according to invoices, events with 200 attendees were held in a 40 m^{2} room), with the money being kicked back to Domani and other federation managers. The second charge was paying for booklets and souvenirs that were not actually produced, and the third charge was signing a contract for medical examinations of the federation's employees with a person who did not have a medical license and did not perform any examinations. Domani left Russia for the United States, was eventually arrested in Montenegro in October 2017 and extradited to Russia in October 2018. On 17 October 2019, he was sentenced to 6 years of imprisonment for fraud, even though the prosecution only asked for a 3.5-years sentence. On 28 May 2020, his sentence was reduced to 4 years, making him eligible for parole.

== Personal life ==
His father Vyacheslav Domani is an Olympic bronze medalist in volleyball.
