= Dmitri Sokolov (basketball) =

Russian basketball player

Dmitry Sokolov
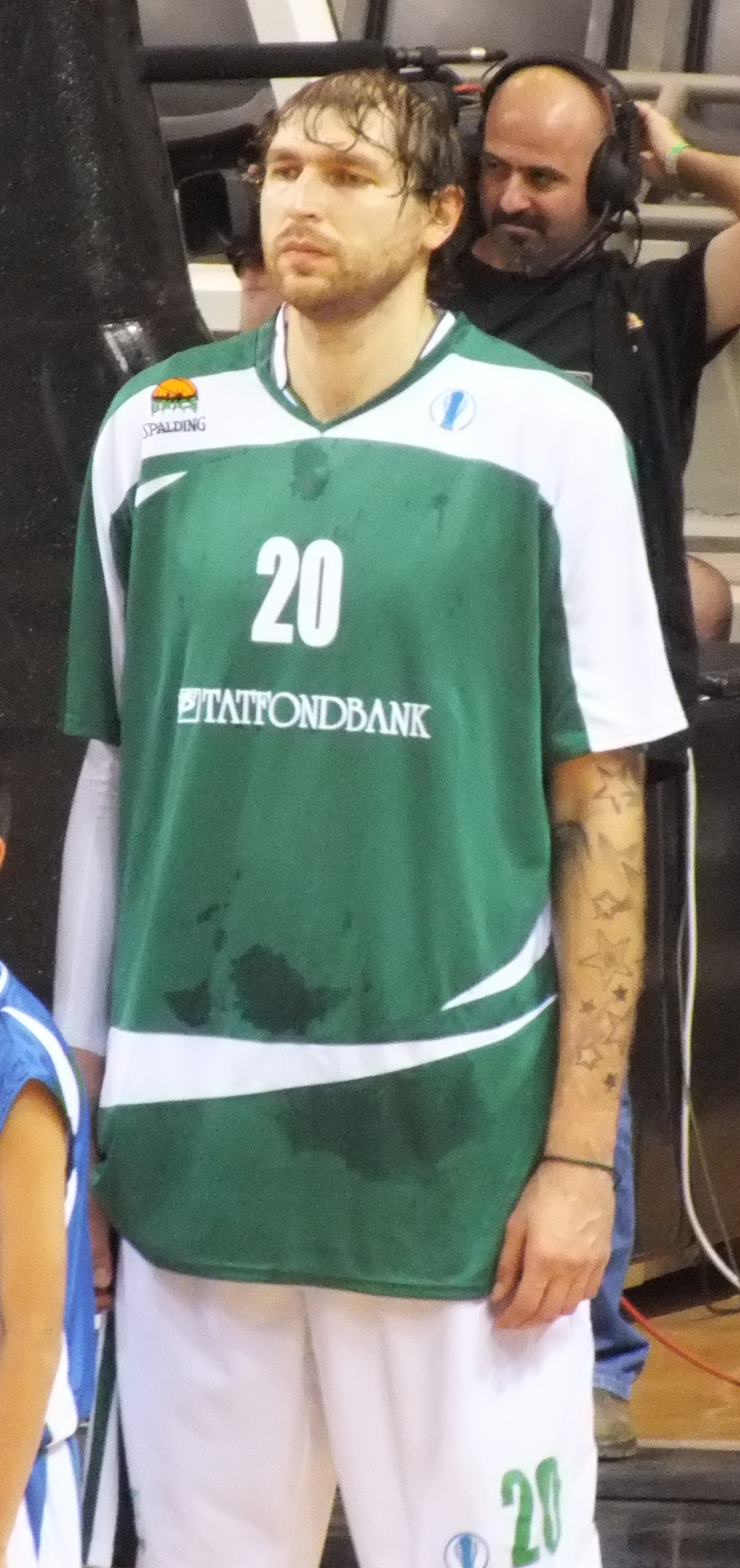
- Sokolov in 2013

Personal information
- Born: January 21, 1985 (age 41) Stavropol Region, Soviet Union
- Listed height: 214 cm (7 ft 0 in)
- Listed weight: 113 kg (249 lb)

Career information
- NBA draft: 2007: undrafted
- Playing career: 2000–2018
- Position: Center

Career history
- 2000–2001: Dynamo Stavropol
- 2001–2002: Pulkovo Saint Petersburg
- 2002–2006: Lokomotiv Rostov
- 2006–2009: UNICS
- 2009–2013: CSKA Moscow
- 2013–2015: UNICS
- 2015: Krasny Oktyabr
- 2015–2018: Khimki

Career highlights
- 4× Russian League champion (2010–2013); 2× VTB League champion (2012, 2013); 3× Russian Cup winner (2009, 2010, 2014); Best Russian Young Player (2004)
Medals
Men's basketball
Representing Russia
FIBA Europe Under-20 Championship
Gold medal – first place	2005 Russia

Dmitry Nikolaevich Sokolov (alternate spelling: Dmitri Sokolov) (Russian: Дмитрий Николаевич Соколов; born January 21, 1985) is a Russian former professional basketball player.

== Professional career ==
Sokolov has played with Dynamo Stavropol, Pulkovo St. Petersburg, Lokomotiv Rostov, UNICS Kazan, and CSKA Moscow during his professional career. He joined CSKA in June 2009. He returned to UNICS Kazan in 2013. In June 2015, he left UNICS.

On July 31, 2015, he signed a one-year deal with Krasny Oktyabr. On December 16, 2015, he left them and signed with Khimki for the rest of the season. On June 23, 2016, he re-signed with Khimki for one more season. He returned to Khimki in March, 2019.

== National team ==
Sokolov played for the Russian national basketball team at the EuroBasket 2009 and EuroBasket 2013.
