= Joshua Primo =

Canadian basketball player (born 2002)

No. 12 – BC Parma
- Position: Shooting guard
- League: VTB United League

Personal information
- Born: December 24, 2002 (age 23) Toronto, Ontario, Canada
- Listed height: 6 ft 4 in (1.93 m)
- Listed weight: 189 lb (86 kg)

Career information
- High school: Huntington Prep (Huntington, West Virginia); Royal Crown (Scarborough, Ontario)
- College: Alabama (2020–2021)
- NBA draft: 2021: 1st round, 12th overall pick
- Drafted by: San Antonio Spurs
- Playing career: 2021–present

Career history
- 2021–2022: San Antonio Spurs
- 2021–2022: →Austin Spurs
- 2023–2024: Los Angeles Clippers
- 2023–2024: →Ontario Clippers
- 2026–present: BC Parma

Career highlights
- SEC All-Freshman Team (2021)
- Stats at NBA.com
- Stats at Basketball Reference

Joshua Lincoln Alexander Primo (/ˈpriːmoʊ/ PREE-moh; born December 24, 2002) is a Canadian professional basketball player, currently playing for BC Parma of the VTB United League. He played college basketball for the Alabama Crimson Tide.

== High school career ==
Primo played basketball for Huntington Prep School in Huntington, West Virginia, where he was teammates with JT Thor. He transferred to Royal Crown Academic School in Scarborough, Toronto. Primo reclassified to the 2020 class and graduated early. Considered a five-star recruit by 247Sports, he committed to playing college basketball for Alabama, choosing the Crimson Tide over Creighton.

== College career ==
In his freshman season, Primo was the youngest player in college basketball. He averaged 8.1 points and 3.4 rebounds per game and was named to the Southeastern Conference (SEC) All-Freshman Team. Primo missed three games with a left medial collateral ligament sprain. On April 21, 2021, he declared for the 2021 NBA draft while maintaining his college eligibility. However, on June 30, Primo announced he would remain in the draft due to a strong performance at the NBA Draft Combine.

== Professional career ==
=== San Antonio Spurs (2021–2022) ===
Primo was selected with the 12th pick in the 2021 NBA draft by the San Antonio Spurs. Primo was later included in the 2021 NBA Summer League roster of the Spurs. On August 11, 2021, the San Antonio Spurs announced that they had signed Primo. On October 20, Primo made his NBA debut, coming off the bench in the final five minutes with three points in a 123–97 win over the Orlando Magic. Primo was the youngest player who attended college to play in the NBA. On October 27, Primo received his first assignment to the Austin Spurs.

Primo was the youngest player in the league during the 2021–22 season.

=== Los Angeles Clippers (2023–2024) ===
On September 29, 2023, the NBA suspended Primo for four games without pay on the grounds that he had exposed himself to women. Later that day, he signed a two-way contract with the Los Angeles Clippers. On November 15, the Clippers converted Primo's two-way contract to a standard contract. However, on April 13, 2024, he was waived by the Clippers.

On October 2, 2024, Primo signed with the Chicago Bulls, but was waived the next day. On October 28, he joined the Windy City Bulls, but was waived on December 29 without playing in a game for the team.

=== BC Parma (2026–present) ===
On September 1, 2026, Primo was signed by BC Parma of the VTB United League.

== National team career ==
Primo represented Canada at the 2019 FIBA Under-19 Basketball World Cup in Greece. At age 16, he was the youngest player on the team and averaged 4.2 points per game.

== Career statistics ==
Legend
GP	Games played	GS	Games started	MPG	Minutes per game
FG%	Field goal percentage	3P%	3-point field goal percentage	FT%	Free throw percentage
RPG	Rebounds per game	APG	Assists per game	SPG	Steals per game
BPG	Blocks per game	PPG	Points per game	**Bold**	Career high

=== NBA ===
==== Regular season ====
Year	Team	GP	GS	MPG	FG%	3P%	FT%	RPG	APG	SPG	BPG	PPG
2021–22	San Antonio	**50**	**16**	19.3	**.374**	**.307**	.746	2.3	1.6	**.4**	**.5**	5.8
2022–23	San Antonio	4	0	**23.3**	.346	.250	**.778**	**3.3**	**4.5**	.3	**.5**	**7.0**
2023–24	L.A. Clippers	2	0	5.1	.333	—	—	.5	.0	.0	**.5**	1.0
Career		56	16	19.1	.371	.300	.750	2.3	1.8	.4	.5	5.7

=== College ===
Year	Team	GP	GS	MPG	FG%	3P%	FT%	RPG	APG	SPG	BPG	PPG
2020–21	Alabama	30	19	22.5	.431	.381	.750	3.4	.8	.6	.3	8.1

== Personal life ==
Primo's older sister, Keshia, played college basketball at the University at Buffalo, Coffeyville Community College, and Southern Connecticut State University.

=== Indecent exposure allegations ===
Primo was waived by the Spurs on October 28, 2022. In a statement released by ESPN through Adrian Wojnarowski, he stated that he was seeking mental health treatment due to a "previous trauma". The next day, it was revealed that Primo allegedly exposed himself to several women. In November, the Spurs' sports psychologist filed a lawsuit against Primo and the team, alleging that Primo had exposed himself to her multiple times. Primo's lawyer then released a statement which denied any wrongdoing, asserting that any exposure was unwitting and that the accuser was not acting in good faith.

On December 8, 2023, District Attorney Joe Gonzales announced his office would not bring charges of indecent exposure against Primo due to insufficient evidence.
