= 2011 FIBA Stanković Continental Champions' Cup =

2011 (I) FIBA Stanković Continental Champions Cup
7th FIBA Stanković Continental Champions Cup

Tournament details
- Host country: China
- Dates: August 1 – 9
- Teams: 4
- Venue: 1 (in 1 host city)

Final positions
- Champions: Angola (2nd title)

Tournament statistics
- Games played: 8

The 2011 FIBA Stanković Continental Champions' Cup, or 2011 FIBA Mini World Cup, officially called Dongfeng Yueda KIA FIBA Stanković Continental Champions' Cup 2011 editions (I) and (II), were the 7th and 8th annual FIBA Stanković Continental Champions' Cup tournaments. They were held as two separate round-robin tournaments, in Haining and Guangzhou, from August 1 to 9.

== Haining tournament ==
=== Participating teams ===
- Angola
- Australia
- China
- Russia

=== Matches - group stage ===
- 1 AUG - Angola - China 67:64

- 1 AUG - Russia - Australia 99:97

- 2 AUG - Australia - Angola 76:68

- 2 AUG - Russia - China 67:52

- 3 AUG - Angola - Russia 60:53

- 3 AUG - Australia - China 69:62

=== Standings ===
Team	Pld	W	L	PF	PA	P	Pts
Australia	3	2	1	242	229	+13	5
Angola	3	2	1	195	193	+2	5
Russia	3	2	1	219	209	+10	5
China	3	0	3	178	203	-25	3

=== Matches - final stage ===
- 4 AUG (third-place playoff) - Russia - China 50:49

- 4 AUG (final) - Angola - Australia 85:66

=== Final standings ===
Rank	Team	Record
Gold medal	Angola	3–1
Silver medal	Australia	2-2
Bronze medal	Russia	3–1
4th	China	0–4

== Guangzhou tournament ==
2011 (II) FIBA Stanković Continental Champions Cup
8th FIBA Stanković Continental Champions Cup

Tournament details
- Host country: China
- Dates: August 1 – 9
- Teams: 4
- Venue: 1 (in 1 host city)

Final positions
- Champions: New Zealand (1st title)

Tournament statistics
- Games played: 8

=== Participating teams ===
- Angola
- China
- New Zealand
- Russia

=== Matches - group stage ===
- 6 AUG - Angola - China 55:52

- 6 AUG - Russia - New Zealand 74:71

- 7 AUG - Russia - Angola 86:58

- 7 AUG - New Zealand - China 89:69

- 8 AUG - New Zealand - Angola 73:70

- 8 AUG - Russia - China 70:45

=== Standings ===
Team	Pld	W	L	PF	PA	PD	Pts
Russia	3	3	0	230	174	+56	6
New Zealand	3	2	1	233	213	+20	5
Angola	3	1	2	183	211	-28	4
China	3	0	3	166	214	-48	3

=== Matches - final stage ===
- 9 AUG (third-place playoff) - China - Angola 64:54

- 9 AUG (final) - New Zealand - Russia 80:77

=== Final standings ===
Rank	Team	Record
Gold medal	New Zealand	3–1
Silver medal	Russia	3–1
Bronze medal	China	1–3
4th	Angola	1–3
