= Alexander Petrenko =

Russian basketball player (1976–2006)

Personal information
- Born: 4 February 1976 Almaty, Kazakh SSR, Soviet Union
- Died: 21 July 2006 (aged 30) Samara, Russia
- Listed height: 6 ft 8.75 in (2.05 m)
- Listed weight: 230 lb (104 kg)
- Position: Power forward
- Coaching career: 1993–2006

Career history
- 1993–1997: Samara
- 1997–1999: Arsenal Tula
- 1999–2000: UNICS
- 2000–2002: CSKA Moscow
- 2002–2006: Khimki

Career highlights
- Russian Player of the Year (2006)

Alexander Anatolievich Petrenko (alternative spelling: Alexandre; 4 February 1976 – 21 July 2006) was a Russian professional basketball player. He was born in Almaty, Kazakh SSR, and held Russian citizenship.

== Professional career ==
Petrenko played professional basketball with Khimki Moscow Region, in the Russian Championship. He was named the Russian League Player of the Year in 2006.

== National team career ==
Petrenko was a member of the senior Russian national basketball team. He played at the 1999 EuroBasket.

== Death ==
Petrenko died in a car crash near Samara, Russia, on 21 July 2006.
