= Evgeniy Pashutin =

Russian basketball player (born 1969)

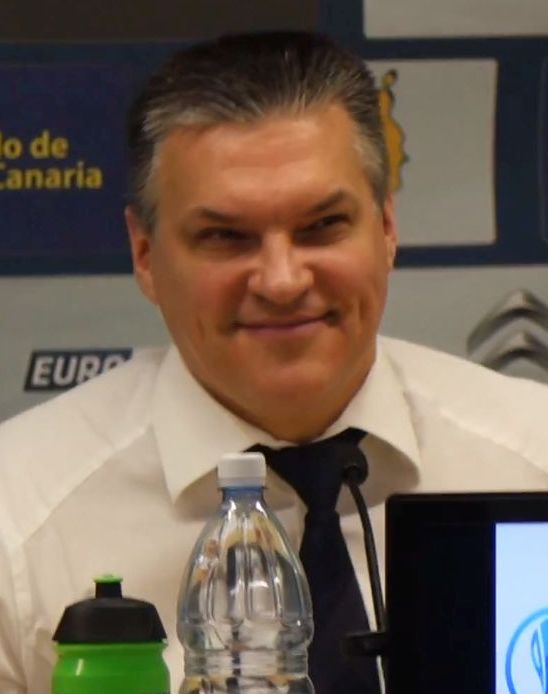
- Pashutin in 2015

Parma Basket
- Title: Head coach
- League: VTB United League

Personal information
- Born: February 6, 1969 (age 57) Sochi, Russian SFSR, Soviet Union
- Listed height: 6 ft 2.75 in (1.90 m)
- Listed weight: 210 lb (95 kg)

Career information
- NBA draft: 1991: undrafted
- Playing career: 1990–2003
- Position: Point guard
- Coaching career: 2003–present

Career history

Playing
- 1990–1994: Spartak Saint Petersburg
- 1994–1995: Dynamo Moscow
- 1995–1999: Avtodor Saratov
- 1999–2000: Maccabi Raanana
- 2000–2002: UNICS Kazan
- 2002–2003: CSKA Moscow

Coaching
- 2003–2004: CSKA Moscow Junior Team
- 2004–2006: Russia Under-20
- 2004–2008: CSKA Moscow (assistant)
- 2008–2009: Spartak Saint Petersburg
- 2009–2010: CSKA Moscow
- 2010–2012: UNICS Kazan
- 2012–2014: Lokomotiv Kuban
- 2014–2016: Russia
- 2014–2017: UNICS Kazan
- 2017: Wisconsin Herd (assistant)
- 2017–2018: Avtodor Saratov
- 2018–2019: Pallacanestro Cantù
- 2019: Avtodor Saratov
- 2019–2021: Lokomotiv Kuban
- 2021–2022: Uralmash Yekaterinburg
- 2022–present: Parma Basket (assistant)

Career highlights
- As player: Honored Master of Sports of Russia; Russian League champion (2003); As head coach: 2× EuroCup champion (2011, 2013); VTB United League champion (2010); VTB United League Hall of Fame (2019); Honored Coach of Russia; RBSL champion (2010); Russian Cup winner (2010); 2× Russian Men's Coach of the Year (2008, 2009); EuroLeague Next Generation Tournament champion (2004); As assistant coach: 2× EuroLeague champion (2006, 2008); 4× RBSL champion (2005–2008); 3× Russian Cup winner (2005–2007)
Medals
Men's basketball
Representing Russia as a player
FIBA World Cup
Silver medal – second place	1994 Canada
FIBA EuroBasket
Bronze medal – third place	1997 Spain
Representing Russia as a head coach
FIBA Europe U20 Championship
Gold medal – first place	2005 Russia

Evgeniy Yuryevich Pashutin (Russian: Евгений Юрьевич Пашутин; born February 6, 1969) is a Russian professional basketball coach and former player. He is the current head coach of Parma Basket of the VTB United League.

== Club career ==
Pashutin played in six teams during his professional playing career, but he did not win any major club titles. His only title as a professional club player was the Russian Super League title in 2003, which he won with CSKA Moscow.

== National team career ==
As a player, Pashutin was a long-time member of the senior Russian national basketball team. With Russia, he played at the following major international tournaments: the 1994 FIBA World Championship, the 1995 EuroBasket, the 1997 EuroBasket, the 1999 EuroBasket, the 2000 Summer Olympics, the 2001 EuroBasket, and the 2002 FIBA World Championship. He won a silver medal at the 1994 FIBA World Championship, and a bronze medal at the 1997 EuroBasket.

== Coaching career ==
Pashutin's first title as a basketball coach came in 2004, when he and his CSKA Moscow junior team won the junior level Euroleague Next Generation Tournament title. Months later, he won the Russian Junior League. After the 2003–04 season ended, Pashutin became the head coach of the Under-20 Russian National Team. After an impressive season with the CSKA junior team, Pashutin became the assistant coach in the professional senior men's CSKA Moscow team to Ettore Messina. In 2005, CSKA won the Russian Cup and the Russian Super League. In the summer of 2005, Pashutin won the 2005 FIBA Europe Under-20 Championship, and in the next season, CSKA won the EuroLeague, Russian Cup, and Russian Super League titles. In the 2006–07 season, CSKA were the runners-up in the EuroLeague, but won both the Russian Cup and Russian Super League titles. In 2008, CSKA again won the EuroLeague title and the Russian Super League titles, but didn't win the Russian Cup, in which they were the runners-up. Pashutin became the head coach of CSKA's senior men's team in the 2009–10 season – CSKA dominated the Russian Super League and won it, and also won the Russian Cup. CSKA also won the VTB United League, the renamed VTB Promo-Cup, for the second year in a row. In the EuroLeague, CSKA made the Final Four, but lost in the semifinals and finished in 3rd place. He left CSKA after that season.

Pashutin then moved on to UNICS Kazan, where he won the European-wide secondary level EuroCup championship, in the 2010–11 season. With UNICS, he also debuted as a head coach for the first time in the EuroLeague, in the 2011–12 season, in which UNICS reached the playoffs. He was also runner-up of the VTB United League in 2012.

Pashutin then signed with Lokomotiv-Kuban for the 2012–13 season – in his first season with the club, Pashutin once again led his team to EuroCup glory, as they won the 2012–13 edition. He also led his team to the finals of the VTB League, where they lost to his former team, CSKA Moscow. In the 2013–14 season, Lokomotiv played in the EuroLeague, reaching the Top 16 phase. Lokomotiv was also the runner-up in the Russian Cup, which they lost to UNICS. Pashutin left Lokomotiv after a disappointing finish in the VTB League season, where the club lost in the league's quarterfinals to CSKA Moscow.

Pashutin then returned to UNICS on November 19, 2014, after signing with the club for remaining 2014–15 season. That time, Pashutin's tenure was without much success. Despite Pashutin improving the club's performance, UNICS endured a failed season in all competitions – with a disappointing finish in the EuroLeague, where the team was eliminated after the regular season, a loss in the semifinals of the EuroCup, and a quarterfinals exit in the VTB League. In a surprise move, UNICS re-signed Pashutin to a new deal. In the 2015–16 season, UNICS was one of the favorites to win the EuroCup, but had another a failure and were eliminated in the first round of the playoffs. UNICS, however, qualified for the following season's EuroLeague, through the VTB League, by reaching the league's finals, although they lost in the finals to CSKA Moscow. In the 2016–17 season, UNICS, while playing in the new format of the EuroLeague, finished in a disastrous 15th place (second to last), and were eliminated in the quarterfinals of the VTB League. After that, UNICS announced that Pashutin would not return as the club's head coach for the next season.

In 2017, Pashutin briefly worked for the Wisconsin Herd of the NBA G League, as an assistant coach, before becoming the head coach of Avtodor Saratov, who Pashutin then led to the VTB League playoffs. On June 7, 2018, Pashutin signed with Cantù of the Italian top level Lega Basket Serie A (LBA). He left Cantù in January, after a 7–10 start in the LBA, and returned to Avtodor Saratov to once again become that club's head coach. On November 27, 2019, after a defeat against Parma, his contract has been terminated by Avtador Saratov.

Pashutin was the head coach of the Russian club Uralmash Yekaterinburg, during the 2021–22 season. On June 13, 2022, he signed with Parma Basket of the VTB United League.

== Head coaching titles and honors ==
=== CSKA Moscow ===
- Russian Champion: (2009–10)
- Russian Cup Winner: (2009–10)
- VTB United League Champion: (2009–10)
- EuroLeague Third-place: (2009–10)

=== UNICS Kazan ===
- EuroCup Champion: (2010–11)

=== Lokomotiv-Kuban ===
- EuroCup Champion: (2012–13)

=== Russian national under-20 team ===
- FIBA Europe Under-20 Championship Gold: (2005)

== Personal life ==
Pashutin's younger brother, Zakhar, is also a former professional basketball player and a basketball coach.
