= Andrey Zubkov =

Russian basketball player

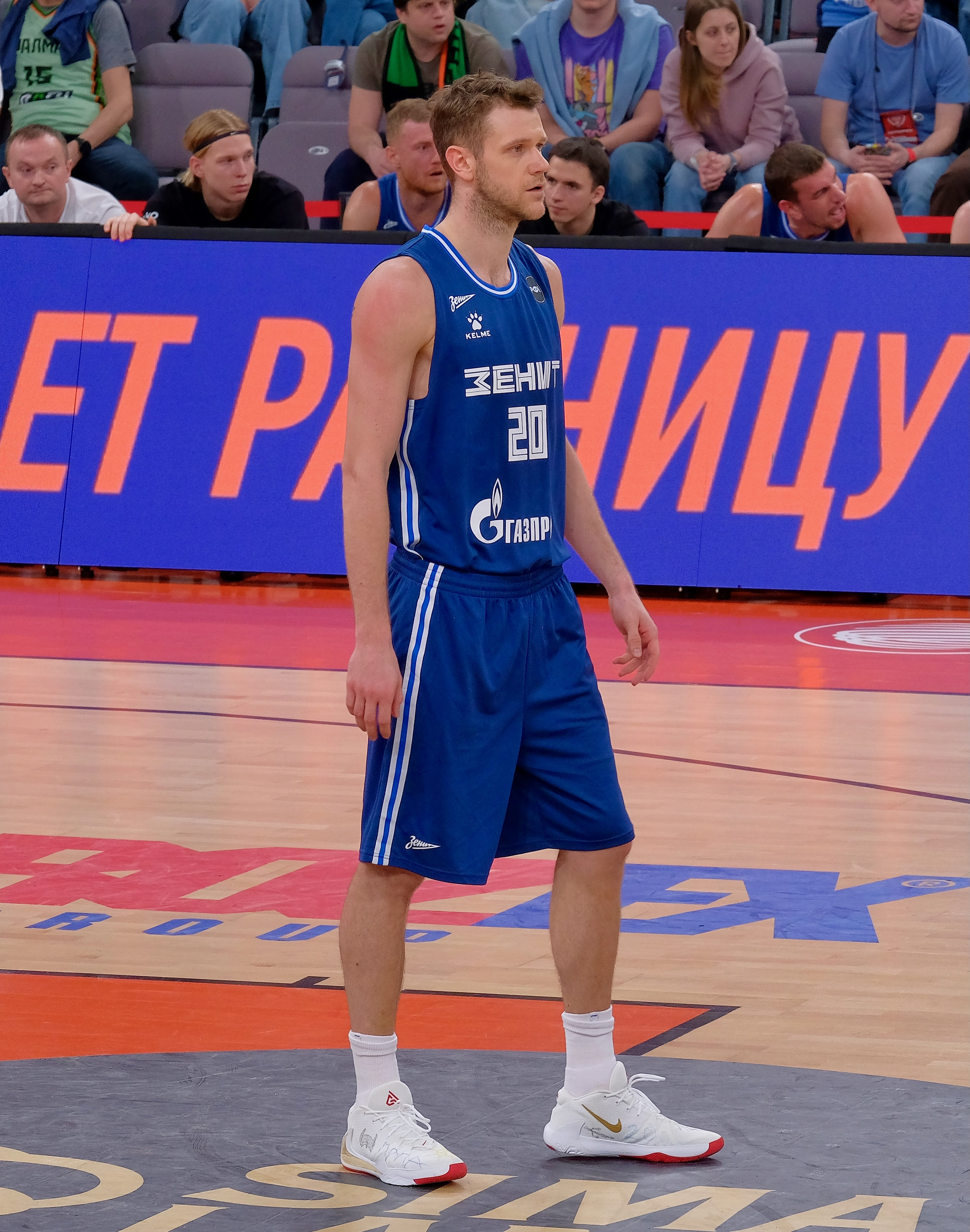

No. 20 – PBC MBA Moscow
- Position: Power forward
- League: VTB United League

Personal information
- Born: June 29, 1991 (age 35) Chelyabinsk, Russian SFSR, Soviet Union
- Listed height: 2.06 m (6 ft 9 in)
- Listed weight: 220 lb (100 kg)

Career information
- NBA draft: 2013: undrafted
- Playing career: 2011–present

Career history
- 2011–2017: Lokomotiv Kuban
- 2017–2019: Khimki
- 2019–2024: Zenit Saint Petersburg
- 2024–present: PBC MBA Moscow

Career highlights
- EuroCup champion (2013); VTB United League champion (2022)

Andrey Yuryevich Zubkov (Russian: Андрей Юрьевич Зубков; born June 29, 1991) is a Russian professional basketball player for the Russian team PBC MBA Moscow of the VTB United League. He also represents the senior Russian national team. He is a 2.06 m (6 ft 9 in) tall power forward.

== Early career ==
Zubkov grew up with the juniors of Lokomotiv-Kuban. He made his debut with Lokomotiv U-23 team during the 2009–10 season, he also played there during the 2010–11 championship season.

== Professional career ==
Zubkov made his debut with the main team during the 2011–12 season. In December 2016, he was named the VTB United League MVP of the Month.

On June 24, 2019, he signed a 3-year contract with the Russian team Zenit Saint Petersburg of the VTB United League.

== Russian national team ==
Zubkov has been a member of the senior Russian national basketball team. He played at the EuroBasket 2015, and at the EuroBasket 2017.
