= Andrey Desyatnikov =

Russian basketball player

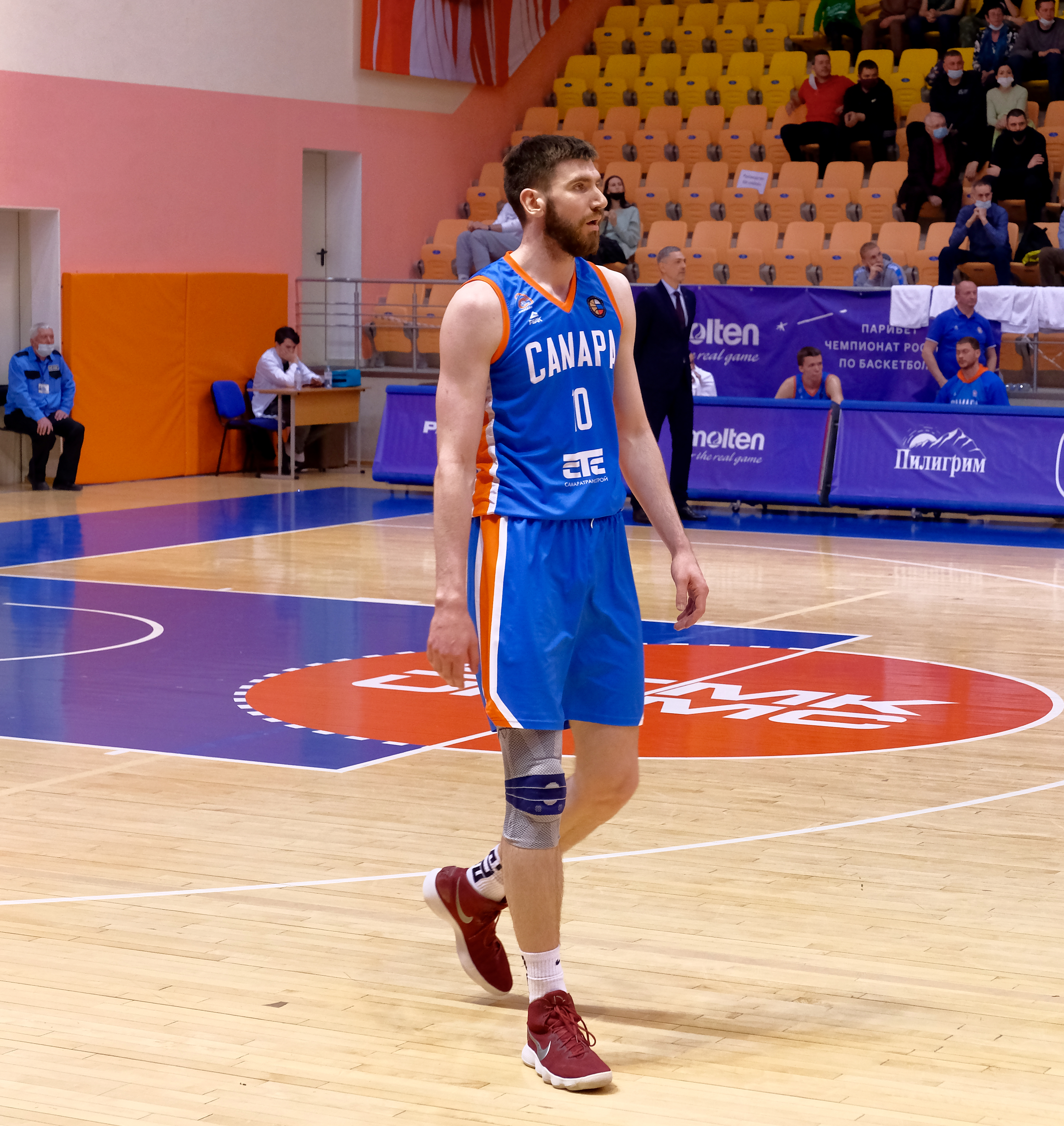

Free agent
- Position: Center

Personal information
- Born: May 4, 1994 (age 32) Vladivostok, Russia
- Listed height: 7 ft 3 in (2.21 m)
- Listed weight: 232 lb (105 kg)

Career information
- NBA draft: 2016: undrafted
- Playing career: 2015–present

Career history
- 2014–2019: Zenit Saint Petersburg
- 2015: → Rossiya Novogorsk
- 2017–2018: → Wilki Morskie Szczecin
- 2019–2021: Khimki
- 2021–2022: Dynamo Vladivostok
- 2022: Samara
- 2022–2023: CSKA Moscow
Medals
Men's basketball
Representing Russia
Summer Universiade
Bronze medal – third place	2015 South Korea	Russia

Andrey Valeryevich Desyatnikov (Russian: Андрей Валерьевич Десятников; born May 4, 1994) is a Russian professional basketball player.

== Professional career ==
Desyatnikov began playing with the junior teams of Spartak Primorie Vladivostok, and played with their Under-18 team during the 2009–10 and 2010–11 seasons. He was invited to the Jordan Brand Classic's International Game in 2010.

He then played with the Under-18 junior team of Triumph Lyubertsy during the 2011–12 season, and with the Under-23 team of Triumph Lyubertsy (Triumph Lyubertsy 2), during the 2012–13 and 2013–14 seasons.

He then moved to Zenit Saint Petersburg for the 2014–15 season, and he made his senior men's professional debut in 2015 with them, after playing in both the Russian 1st-tier VTB United League, and in the European 2nd-tier league, the EuroCup.

During the 2014–15 season, he also played with Zenit Saint Petersburg 2 (the club's Under-23 team), and with Rossiya Novogorsk on loan. Desyatnikov declared as an early entrant for the 2015 NBA draft, but he withdrew before the draft.

== International career ==
Desyatnikov played with the junior national teams of Russia at the Albert Schweitzer Tournament and FIBA Europe Under-18 Championship in 2012. He also played with the junior national teams of Russia at both the 2013 FIBA Under-19 World Championship and the 2014 FIBA Europe Under-20 Championship. He also won a bronze medal playing with Russia's national university team at the 2015 World University Games.

He was selected to the senior men's Russian national basketball team for the EuroBasket 2015.
