= Anton Ponkrashov =

Russian basketball player

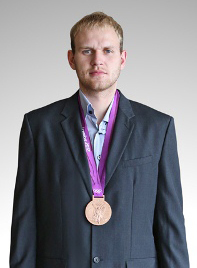

Personal information
- Born: April 23, 1986 (age 40) Leningrad, Soviet Union
- Listed height: 200 cm (6 ft 7 in)
- Listed weight: 96 kg (212 lb)

Career information
- NBA draft: 2008: undrafted
- Playing career: 2001–2024
- Position: Guard / small forward

Career history
- 2001–2002: Pulkovo
- 2002–2003: LenVo Saint Petersburg
- 2004–2006: Spartak Saint Petersburg
- 2006–2010: CSKA Moscow
- 2007–2009: →Khimki
- 2010–2011: Spartak Saint Petersburg
- 2011–2013: CSKA Moscow
- 2013–2014: Krasnye Krylia
- 2014: Lokomotiv Kuban
- 2014: Krasny Oktyabr
- 2015–2019: UNICS Kazan
- 2019–2020: Zenit Saint Petersburg
- 2021: Khimki
- 2021–2022: Nazm Avaran Sirjan
- 2022–2024: Nizhny Novgorod

Career highlights
- 3× Russian League champion (2007, 2012, 2013); 2× VTB United League champion (2012, 2013); 3× Russian Cup winner (2007, 2008, 2010); 2× Russian All-Star (2007, 2011)
Medals
Men's basketball
Representing Russia
Summer Olympics
Bronze medal – third place	2012 London
FIBA EuroBasket
Gold medal – first place	2007 Spain
Bronze medal – third place	2011 Lithuania

Anton Aleksandrovich Ponkrashov (Russian: Антон Александрович Понкрашов, born April 23, 1986) is a Russian former professional basketball player. Standing at 2.00 m (6 ft 6 1/2 in), he played as a swingman and as a point guard.

== Professional career ==
Ponkrashov joined Pulkovo during the 2001–02 season. He moved to LenVo Saint Petersburg for the 2002–03 season. He then moved to Spartak St. Petersburg for the 2004–05 season. He then joined CSKA Moscow for the 2006–07 season. He then moved to Khimki Moscow Region for the 2007–08 season and he returned to CSKA Moscow before the 2009–10 season.

Ponkrashov has played for the Phoenix Suns in the NBA Summer League in 2010. On July 21, 2010 he signed a two-year contract with Spartak Saint Petersburg. In July 2011 he signed a two-year contract with an option for a third year with CSKA Moscow. He left CSKA again in June 2013.

On February 16, 2014, he signed with Lokomotiv Kuban for the rest of the season. On August 17, 2014, he signed with Krasny Oktyabr. On December 31, 2014 he left Krasny Oktyabr and signed a three-year deal with UNICS Kazan. On June 15, 2017, he re-signed with UNICS.

On July 17, 2019, he signed with Zenit Saint Petersburg of the VTB United League. On July 7, 2020, Ponkrashov was released from the Russian club.

On February 3, 2021, he has signed with Khimki of the VTB United League. Ponkrashov averaged 5.2 points, 3.1 assists, and 3.0 rebounds per game.

On October 7, 2021, he signed with Nazm Avaran Sirjan of the Iranian Basketball Super League.

On July 15, 2022, he signed with Nizhny Novgorod of the VTB United League.

== National team career ==
Ponkrashov is also a member of the senior Russian national basketball team. With the Russian national team he won the gold medal at the 2007 FIBA European Championship, a bronze medal at the 2012 Summer Olympics and a bronze medal at the 2011 European Championships.
