= Ramil Sheriff =

Footballer (born 1993)

Personal information
- Full name: Ramil Omar Sheriff
- Date of birth: 26 December 1993 (age 32)
- Place of birth: London, England
- Positions: Centre-back; midfielder

Youth career
- Arsenal
- –2012: Tottenham Hotspur

Senior career*
| Years | Team | Apps | (Gls) |
| 2012–2013 | Norwich City | 0 | (0) |
| 2013 | Cockfosters | 0 | (0) |
| 2013 | Northwood | 11 | (0) |
| 2014 | Harrow Borough | 0 | (0) |
| 2015 | Haringey Borough | ? | (?) |
| 2015–2016 | Woluwe-Zaventem | 18 | (0) |
| 2016–2018 | Haringey Borough | 49 | (1) |

International career^{‡}
- Jamaica U-20
| 2014 | Jamaica | 1 | (0) |
- * Club domestic league appearances and goals as of 21:09, 28 May 2016 (UTC) ‡ National team caps and goals as of 18:45, 12 July 2014 (UTC)

Ramil Omar Sheriff (born 26 December 1993) is a footballer who plays as a centre-back or midfielder. He made one appearance for the Jamaica national team in 2014

== Club career ==
Sheriff began his career in the youth teams at Arsenal and Tottenham Hotspur. He secured a contract with Norwich City in 2012. He was appointed captain of the U21 side and played 19 times in the Professional Development League in 2012–13. However, his contract concluded in June 2013 and he was released by the club.

In 2013–14, Sheriff played for Cockfosters and Northwood before moving onto Harrow Borough and Haringey Borough for the 2014–15 season.

Sheriff played for Belgian Third Division B side Woluwe-Zaventem in the 2015–16 season. He re-joined Haringey Borough for 2016–17.

== International career ==
Sheriff was capped by Jamaica at U-20 level. He made his debut for the senior side on 8 June 2014 in an 8–0 away friendly loss against France, coming on as a 65th-minute substitute for Chris Humphrey.
