= Stanislav Yeryomin =

Russian basketball player and coach

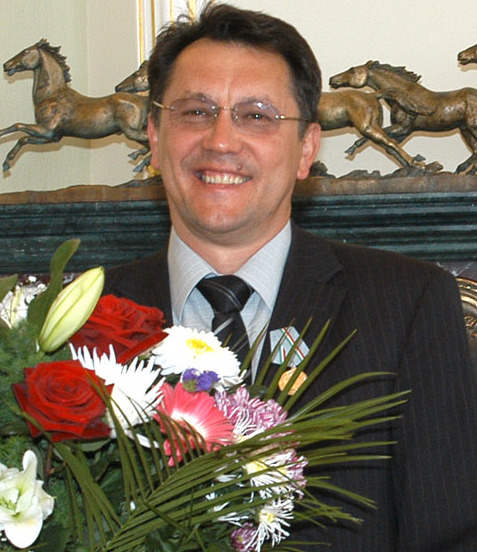
- 2006

Personal information
- Born: February 26, 1951 (age 75) Sverdlovsk, Russian SFSR, Soviet Union
- Listed height: 5 ft 11.25 in (1.81 m)
- Listed weight: 210 lb (95 kg)

Career information
- Playing career: 1969–1985
- Position: Point guard
- Number: 4
- Coaching career: 1986–2013

Career history

Playing
- 1969–1974: Uralmash Sverdlovsk
- 1974–1985: CSKA Moscow

Coaching
- 1986–1988: BC Al Jeish
- 1989–1992: CSKA Moscow (junior teams)
- 1989–1992: CSKA Moscow (assistant)
- 1992–2000: CSKA Moscow
- 2000–2006: UNICS Kazan
- 2007–2010: Triumph Lyubertsy
- 2010–2011: Krasnye Krylya Samara
- 2013: UNICS Kazan

Career highlights
- As a player: 2× FIBA European Selection (1979, 1981); 9× USSR League champion (1976–1984); USSR Cup winner (1982); Order of the Badge of Honor (USSR) (1982); Honored Master of Sports of the USSR (1979); As a head coach: FIBA EuroStar (1998); FIBA EuroChallenge champion (2004); 9× Russian Championship champion (1992–2000); Russian Cup winner (2003); 4× Russian Men's Coach of the Year (2004–2007); 2× North European League champion (2000, 2003); Order of Honour (Russia) (1998)
Medals
Men's basketball
Representing Soviet Union
Olympic Games
Bronze medal – third place	1980 Moscow
FIBA World Championship
Silver medal – second place	1978 Philippines
Gold medal – first place	1982 Colombia
FIBA EuroBasket
Silver medal – second place	1977 Belgium
Gold medal – first place	1979 Italy
Gold medal – first place	1981 Czechoslovakia
Bronze medal – third place	1983 France

Stanislav Georgiyevich Yeryomin (Russian: Станислав Георгиевич Ерёмин; born February 26, 1951 in Sverdlovsk, Soviet Union), last name also spelled Eremin and Yeremin, is a retired Russian professional basketball player and coach. During his playing career, at a height of 1.81 m (5'11 1/4") tall, he played at the point guard position. He is also a retired Russian Army Colonel.

== Professional career ==
Yeryomin spent most of his career with CSKA Moscow. He was a member of the FIBA European Selection in 1979 and 1981.

== National team career ==
Yeryomin was a member of the senior Soviet Union national basketball team that won the bronze medal at the 1980 Moscow Summer Olympic Games.

== Coaching career ==
Yeryomin was a 4 time Russian Men's Coach of the Year (2004, 2005, 2006, 2007).
