= Valentin Kubrakov =

Russian basketball player

Personal information
- Nationality: Russian
- Born: 25 July 1972 (age 54) Salsk, Russian SFSR, Soviet Union

Sport
- Sport: Basketball

Valentin Kubrakov (born 25 July 1972) is a Russian basketball player. He competed in the men's tournament at the 2000 Summer Olympics.
