= Dmitry Khvostov (basketball) =

Russian basketball player

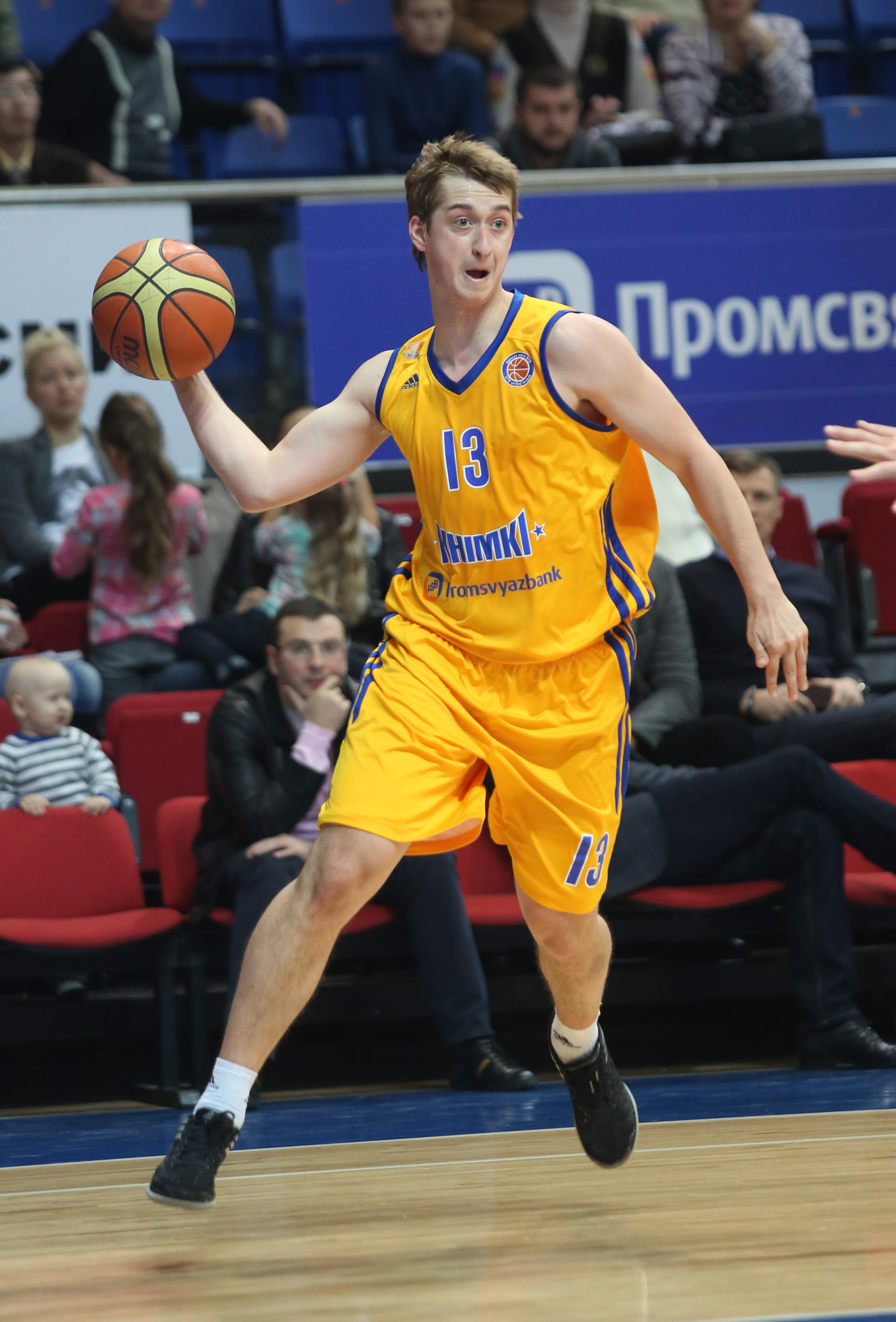
- Khvostov with Khimki in October 2012

No. 13 – BC Nizhny Novgorod
- Position: Point guard
- League: VTB United League

Personal information
- Born: August 21, 1989 (age 37) Ivanovo, Russian SFSR, Soviet Union
- Listed height: 6 ft 2.75 in (1.90 m)
- Listed weight: 190 lb (86 kg)

Career information
- NBA draft: 2011: undrafted
- Playing career: 2006–present

Career history
- 2006–2011: Dynamo Moscow
- 2011–2013: Khimki
- 2013–2016: Nizhny Novgorod
- 2016–2019: Lokomotiv Kuban
- 2019–2021: Zenit Saint Petersburg
- 2021–present: Nizhny Novgorod

Career highlights
- Best Russian Young Player (2009); EuroCup champion (2012)
Medals
Men's basketball
Representing Russia
Olympic Games
Bronze medal – third place	2012 London
EuroBasket
Bronze medal – third place	2011 Lithuania

Dmitry Grigoryevich Khvostov (Russian: Дми́трий Григорьевич Хвосто́в; born August 21, 1989) is a Russian professional basketball player for Nizhny Novgorod of the VTB United League. He was part of Russia's bronze medal winning team at the 2012 Summer Olympics. He is 1.90 m in height and 86 kg in weight.

== Professional career ==
Khvostov was named the Best Russian Young Player in 2009. In 2012, he won the EuroCup championship with Khimki Moscow Region.

On June 26, 2019, Khvostov signed a three-year contract with Zenit Saint Petersburg of the VTB United League.

== National team career ==
Khvostov has been a member of the senior men's Russia national basketball team. He played with Russia's senior team at the EuroBasket 2011, where he won a bronze medal. He also played at the 2012 Summer Olympics, where he won a bronze medal.
