= Ramil Valeyev =

Russian footballer and coach

Personal information
- Full name: Ramil Kamilevich Valeyev
- Date of birth: 1 August 1973 (age 53)
- Place of birth: Kazan, Russian SFSR, Soviet Union
- Height: 1.85 m (6 ft 1 in)
- Position: Goalkeeper

Senior career*
Years	Team	Apps	(Gls)
1991	FC SKA Rostov-on-Don	3	(0)
1991	FC APK Azov	23	(0)
1992–1993	FC Rostselmash-d Rostov-on-Don	34	(0)
1994–1995	FC Rostselmash Rostov-on-Don	21	(0)
1996	FC Saturn Ramenskoye	3	(0)
1997–1998	FC Torpedo Arzamas	59	(0)
1999–2000	FC Tyumen	55	(0)
2001–2002	FC Kuzbass-Dynamo Kemerovo	54	(0)
2003	FC Volga Ulyanovsk	7	(0)
2004	FC Tobol Kurgan	10	(0)

Managerial career
- 2007: FC Rostov (reserves GK coach)
- 2008: FC Rostov (scout)
- 2009: FC Rostov (GK coach)
- 2010–2012: FC Rostov (reserves GK coach)
- 2012–2014: FC SKVO Rostov-on-Don (assistant)
- 2015: FC Biolog-Novokubansk Progress (assistant)
- * Club domestic league appearances and goals

Ramil Kamilevich Valeyev (Russian: Рамиль Камилевич Валеев; born 1 August 1973) is a Russian professional football coach and a former player.
