= Evgeny Valiev =

Russian basketball player

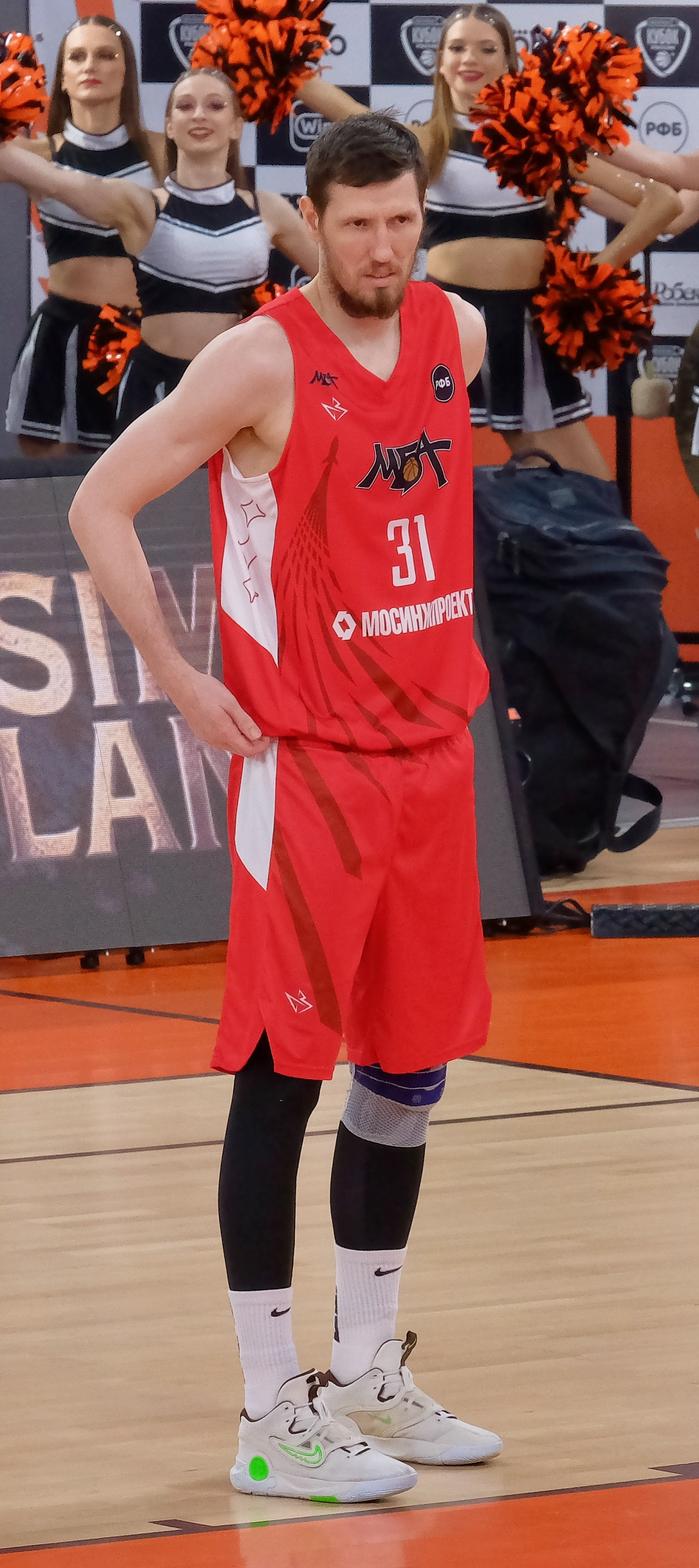

Free agent
- Position: Power forward

Personal information
- Born: May 3, 1990 (age 36)
- Listed height: 2.05 m (6 ft 9 in)
- Listed weight: 93 kg (205 lb)

Career information
- NBA draft: 2012: undrafted
- Playing career: 2008–present

Career history
- 2008–2019: Triumph Lyubertsy / Zenit Saint Petersburg
- 2019–2021: Khimki
- 2020–2021: → Parma
- 2021–2022: BC UNICS

Evgeny Damirovich Valiev (Russian: Евгений Дамирович Валиев; born May 3, 1990) is a Russian professional basketball player.

== Professional career ==
On June 25, 2019, he has signed a two-year contract with Khimki of the VTB United League. On December 2, 2019, he has signed a season long loan deal with Parma.
