= BC Parma =

Parma
- Leagues: VTB United League
- Founded: 2 August 2012; 14 years ago
- History: BC Parma (2012–present)
- Arena: Universal Sports Palace Molot
- Capacity: 7,000
- Location: Perm, Russia
- Head coach: Evgeny Pashutin
- Championships: 2 Russian Cups
- Website: parmabasket.ru
Home	Away

BC Parma (Russian: БК Парма), also known as Parma Basket, is a professional basketball based in Perm, Russia. It plays in the VTB United League, the highest level of basketball in Russia. The club's full name is Parma Basket Perm. It is unrelated to the Italian city of Parma.

== History ==
BC Parma was established in 2012. In 2016, Parma Basket won the Russian Cup title, by beating Zenit Saint Petersburg in the Russian Cup Final. In the 2016–17 season, Parma joined the VTB United League, the country's first tier league. To meet the arena requirements of the league, Parma moved to the Universal Sports Palace Molot. In its first United League season the club finished last in the regular season with just one win.

In 2020, Parma made its debut in the main stage of a European competition as the team played in the 2020–21 FIBA Europe Cup. After surviving the group stage, the team beat Rilski Sportist and Balkan Botevgrad in the eight- and quarterfinals. It qualified for the Final Four that is to be played in Tel Aviv.

== Players ==
=== Current roster ===
Note: Flags indicate national team eligibility at FIBA-sanctioned events. Players may hold other non-FIBA nationalities not displayed.

Parma roster
Players
Coaches

Pos.	No.	Nat.	Name	Ht.	Age
F	1	(United States)	Whaley, Isaiah	2.06 m (6 ft 9 in)	28 – 26 March 1998
F	2	(United States)	Johnson, B. J.	2.01 m (6 ft 7 in)	30 – 21 December 1995
F	3	(Russia)	Svinin, Lev	2.04 m (6 ft 8 in)	20 – 9 October 2006
F	4	(United States)	Nelson, Tyrell	2.01 m (6 ft 7 in)	31 – 18 June 1995
G	5	(United States)	Martin, Jeremiah	1.91 m (6 ft 3 in)	30 – 19 June 1996
C	7	(Russia)	Golovchenko, Grigory	2.11 m (6 ft 11 in)	19 – 28 February 2007
C	9	(Russia)	Karpenkov, Ilia	2.05 m (6 ft 9 in)	29 – 17 February 1997
F	11	(Russia)	Ilnitskiy, Stanislav	2.00 m (6 ft 7 in)	32 – 24 February 1994
G	12	(Canada)	Primo, Joshua	1.98 m (6 ft 6 in)	23 – 24 December 2002
G	22	(Russia)	Sheiko, Semyon	2.00 m (6 ft 7 in)	20 – 10 January 2006
G	23	(United States)	Fobbs, Brian	1.96 m (6 ft 5 in)	28 – 17 February 1998
C	35	(Russia)	Shashkov, Alexandr	2.10 m (6 ft 11 in)	26 – 26 February 2000
G	47	(Russia)	Mironov, Ivan	1.97 m (6 ft 6 in)	20 – 13 March 2006
G	70	(Russia)	Egorov, Ivan	1.89 m (6 ft 2 in)	21 – 18 June 2005

Head coach

- (Russia) Evgeny Pashutin

Assistant coach(es)

- (Russia) Zakhar Pashutin
- (Russia) Vyacheslav Shushakov
- (Russia) Evgeny Kalinin
- (Russia) Maxim Grigoryev

Team manager

- (Russia) Vasiliy Kozlovtsev

Legend

- (C) Team captain
- Injured

- Roster
Updated: November 16, 2026

=== Notable players ===
- (United States) Tony Carr
- (United States) C. J. Bryce
- (Canada) Joshua Primo

=== Individual awards ===
United League Young Player of the Year

- Ivan Ukhov – 2017

== Season by season ==
Season	Tier	League	Regular season					Playoffs	Russian Cup	European competition			Head coach
Season	Tier	League	Finish	Played	Wins	Losses	Win%	Playoffs	Russian Cup	Competition	Round	Record	Head coach
Parma Basket
2012–13	3	Higher League	4th										Vyacheslav Shushakov
2013–14	2	Super League	12th										Vyacheslav Shushakov
2014–15	2	Super League	5th	32	20	12	.625	–					Vyacheslav Shushakov
2015–16	2	Super League	4th	32	18	15	.545	–	C				Vyacheslav Shushakov
2016–17	1	United League	13th	24	1	23	.042	–	SF				Vyacheslav Shushakov
2017–18	1	United League	11th	17	7	17	.292	–	QF	4 FIBA Europe Cup	2QR	2–1–1	Nikolajs Mazurs
2018–19	1	United League	13th	26	5	21	.192	–	C				Nikolajs Mazurs; Vyacheslav Shushakov
2019–20	1	United League	5th (Note: The 2019–20 VTB United League was cancelled early due to the COVID-19 pandemic, no playoffs were held.)	18	8	10	.444	N/A					Vyacheslav Shushakov; Kazys Maksvytis
2020–21	1	United League								4 FIBA Europe Cup			Kazys Maksvytis

== European record ==
Season	Competition	Round	Club	Home	Away
2017–18	FIBA Europe Cup	QR1	(North Macedonia) Rabotnički	88–63	73–95
2017–18	FIBA Europe Cup	QR2	(France) ESSM Le Portel	74–74	74–55
2020–21	FIBA Europe Cup	RS	(Netherlands) Donar	93–81	
2020–21	FIBA Europe Cup	RS	(Netherlands) Heroes Den Bosch	85–63	
2020–21	FIBA Europe Cup	EF	(Bulgaria) Rilski Sportist	90–61	
2020–21	FIBA Europe Cup	QF	(Bulgaria) Balkan	84–62	
2020–21	FIBA Europe Cup	SF	(Israel) Ironi Nes Ziona	80–81	
2020–21	FIBA Europe Cup	3rd	(Romania) CSM Oradea	76–85	

== Arenas ==
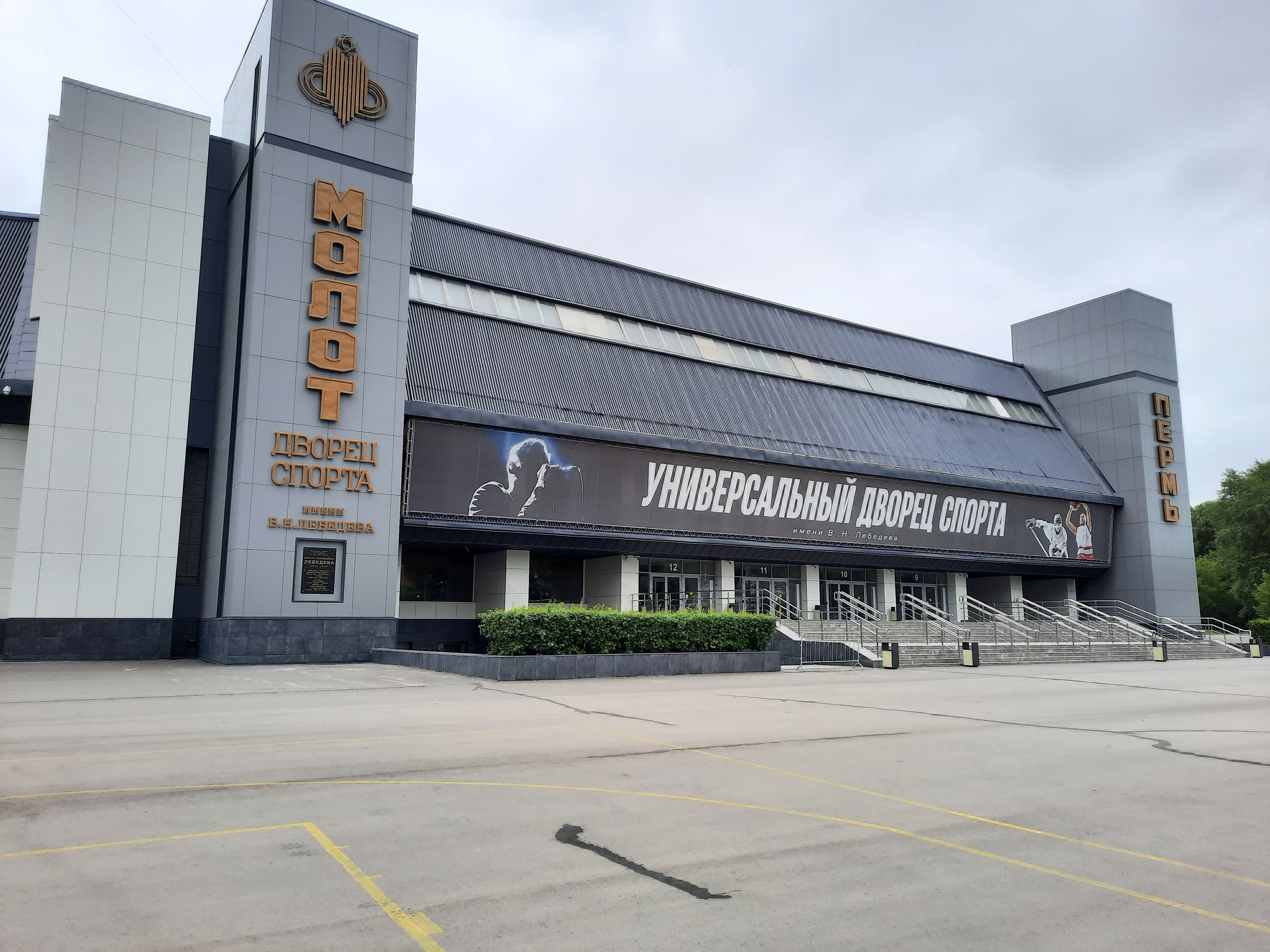
The Universal Sports Palace Molot

During its existence, Parma Basket has played in the following arenas:

- Sportcomplex Sukhanov (2012–2016)
- Universal Sports Palace Molot (2016–present)

== Honours ==
Russian Cup

- Winners (2): 2015–16, 2018–19

FIBA Europe Cup

- Fourth place (1): 2020–21

Gomelsky Cup

- Runners-up (1): 2020

== Head coaches ==
Period	Name	Honours
2012–2017	(Russia) Vyacheslav Shushakov	Russian Cup (2016)
2017–2018	(Latvia) Nikolajs Mazurs	
2019	(Russia) Vyacheslav Shushakov	Russian Cup (2019)
2019–2022	(Lithuania) Kazys Maksvytis	

== See also ==
- Ural Great
