= 2011–12 Galatasaray S.K. (men's basketball) season =

Galatasaray MP
2011–12 season
- Chairman: (Turkey) Ünal Aysal
- Manager: (Turkey) Oktay Mahmuti
- 2011 Turkish President's Cup: Winner
- Average home league attendance: 4,394

Galatasaray SK. Men's 2011–2012 season is the 2011–2012 basketball season for Turkish professional basketball club Galatasaray Medical Park.

The club competes in:

- 2011–12 Euroleague
- 2011–12 Turkish Basketball League
- 2011–12 Turkish Cup Basketball
- Turkish President's Cup

== Roster ==
=== Depth chart ===
Pos.	Starting 5	Bench 1	Bench 2	Reserve
C	Furkan Aldemir	Darius Songaila
PF	Luksa Andric	Boris Savovic	Cevher Özer
SF	Josh Shipp	Preston Shumpert	Caner Topaloğlu	Haluk Yıldırım
SG	Hüseyin Göksenin Köksal	Jaka Lakovič	Evren Büker
PG	Jamon Lucas Gordon	Ender Arslan	Tutku Açık

== Squad changes for the 2011–2012 season ==
In: Note: Flags indicate national team as defined under FIFA eligibility rules; some limited exceptions apply. Players may hold more than one non-FIFA nationality.

No.	Pos.	Nation	Player
41	PF	TUR	Cevher Özer (from Beşiktaş Milangaz)
19	PF	TUR	Furkan Aldemir (from Pınar Karşıyaka)
25	F/C	LTU	Darius Songaila (from Philadelphia 76ers)
10	PG	SVN	Jaka Lakovič (from FC Barcelona Bàsquet)
33	PG	TUR	Ender Arslan (from Efes Pilsen S.K.)
22	SG	USA	Jamon Gordon (from Olympiacos B.C.)
13	C	GEO	Zaza Pachulia (from Atlanta Hawks)
24	SG	TUR	Can Korkmaz (from Pertevniyal)
42	PF	SRB	Boris Savović (from Hemofarm)
44	SG	BIH	Nihad Đedović (from Virtus Roma)

Out: Note: Flags indicate national team as defined under FIFA eligibility rules; some limited exceptions apply. Players may hold more than one non-FIFA nationality.

No.	Pos.	Nation	Player
5		TUR	Ermal Kuqo (to Efes Pilsen S.K.)
4		USA	Jerry Johnson (to BC Astana (Kazakhstan))
6		USA	Taylor Rochestie (to Le Mans Sarthe Basket)
14		SVN	Radoslav Rančík (to BC Azovmash)

Out On Loan: Note: Flags indicate national team as defined under FIFA eligibility rules; some limited exceptions apply. Players may hold more than one non-FIFA nationality.

No.	Pos.	Nation	Player
12		TUR	Melih Mahmutoğlu (to Antalya Büyükşehir Belediyespor)
17	C	TUR	Sertaç Şanlı (to Tofaş S.K.)
24	SG	TUR	Can Korkmaz (to Darüşşafaka)
21	PF	TUR	İlkan Karaman (to Pınar Karşıyaka)

== Results, schedules and standings ==
=== Preseason games ===
August 27
11:00 TSI

(Report)

Darüşşafaka Cooper Tires	34–79	Galatasaray MP
Scoring by quarter: 7–17, 13–19, 7–25, 7–18
Pts: Gökhan Sünter 12; Rebs: - Asts: -		Pts: Cevher Özer 16, Preston Shumpert 13, Hüseyin Göksenin Köksal 8, Sertaç Şanlı 7, Tutku Açık 7 Rebs: Sertaç Şanlı 7, Cevher Özer with 5

Ayhan Şahenk Arena, Istanbul
Attendance: unknown

August 29
16:30 TSI

(Report)

Hacettepe Üniversitesi	64–88	Galatasaray MP
Scoring by quarter: 23–31, 10–23, 1421, 17–13
Pts: Richardo Marsh 18, Sherron Collins 11, Derya Yannıer 10, Rebs: - Asts: -		Pts: Josh Ship 16, Preston Shumpert 16, Sertaç Şanlı 11, Jamon Gordon 7, Furkan Aldemir 7 Rebs: Furkan Aldemir 13, Sertaç Şanlı 6 Asts: Jamon Gordon 5

Ayhan Şahenk Arena, Istanbul
Attendance: unknown

September 10
19:00 TSI

(Report)

KK Union Olimpija	61–71	Galatasaray MP
Scoring by quarter: 18–13, 14–16, 9–23, 20–19
Pts: - Rebs: - Asts: -		Pts: Preston Shumpert 18, Sertaç Şanlı 13, Josh Ship 10; Rebs: Preston Shumpert with 6 Asts: Cevher Özer 4

Kranjska Gora, Slovenia
Attendance: unknown

September 11
19:00 TSI

(Report)

Cibona Zagreb	77–79	Galatasaray MP
Scoring by quarter: 20–18, 17–21, 17–20, 23–20
Pts: Tomislav Zubčić 14, Brian Chase 12, Andrija Žižić 10; Rebs: - Asts: -		Pts: Lukša Andrić 18, Jamon Gordon 12, Josh Ship 15 Tutku Açık 7 Rebs: Josh Ship 4, Lukša Andrić 4 Asts: Tutku Açık 7

Kranjska Gora, Slovenia
Attendance: unknown

September 13
18:00 TSI

(Report)

CEZ Nymburk	61–87	Galatasaray MP
Scoring by quarter: 14–24, 20–18, 15–19, 12–26
Pts: Drew Naymick 12, Petr Benda 8, Radek Necas 8 Rebs: - Asts: -		Pts: Lukša Andrić 21, Furkan Aldemir 10, Preston Shumpert 10; Rebs: Lukša Andrić 7, Furkan Aldemir 5, Evren Büker 4 Asts: Jamon Gordon 7, Tutku Açık 6

Kranjska Gora, Slovenia
Attendance: unknown

September 23
18:00 TSI

(Report)

Banvit B.K.	78–79	Galatasaray MP
Scoring by quarter: 26–19, 19–22, 22–23, 11–15
Pts: Serkan Erdoğan 20, Lance Williams 17, Kenan Bajramovic 12; Rebs: - Asts: -		Pts: Luksa Andric 18, Darius Songaila 10, Preston Shumpert 10; Rebs: Furkan Aldemir 9, Darius Songaila 7 Asts: Jaka Lakovič 5, Tutku Açık 3

Ayhan Şahenk Arena, Istanbul
Attendance: none

September 24
?

(Report)

Boluspor	86–57	Galatasaray MP*

17 Temmuz Spor Salonu, Bolu
Attendance: none

September 25
17:00 TSI

(Report)

Erdemirspor	59–73	Galatasaray MP
Scoring by quarter: 14–24, 019–14, 18–19, 8–16
Pts: Mutlu Akpınar 9, Ray Wesson 7 Rebs: - Asts: -		Pts: Darius Songaila 17, Preston Shumpert 11, Sertaç Şanlı 11, Jaka Lakovic 10; Rebs: Sertaç Şanlı 6, Cevher Özer 6, Furkan Aldemir 5 Asts: Jaka Lakovič 2, Jamon Gordon 2

Ayhan Şahenk Arena, Istanbul
Attendance: none

January 21
unknown TSI

(Report)

Tofaş S.K.	61–83	Galatasaray MP
Scoring by quarter: 17–21, 11–18, 21–20, 12–24
Pts: - Asts: -		Pts: - Asts: -

Ayhan Şahenk Arena, Istanbul
Attendance: none

- Note: A youth team scrimmaged against Boluspor which represented first team.

==== Pınar Cup ====
Galatasaray MP won this tournament and Jamon Gordon was awarded Best Player.

September 16
18:00 TSI

(Report)

Galatasaray MP	82–70	Alba Berlin
Scoring by quarter: 24–24, 13–18, 27–11, 18–17
Pts: Furkan Aldemir 14, Preston Shumpert 11, Lukša Andrić 11, Cevher Özer 11, Jamon Gordon 11, Josh Ship 10; Rebs: Furkan Aldemir 7, Lukša Andrić 7, Josh Ship 7, Cevher Özer 6 Asts: Ender Arslan 3, Cevher Özer 3		Pts: Bryce Taylor 16, Dashaun Wood 12, Derrick Allen 11; Rebs: – Asts: –

Karşıyaka Arena, İzmir
Attendance: unknown

September 17
18:30 TSI

(Report)

Galatasaray MP	82–62	Pınar Karşıyaka
Scoring by quarter: 19-14, 19-17, 26-14, 21-14
Pts: Furkan Aldemir 11, Lukša Andrić 11; Rebs: Preston Shumpert 7, Furkan Aldemir 6 Asts: Jamon Gordon 4, Tutku Açık 4		Pts: Alper Saruhan 12, İlkan Karaman 12; Rebs: Emre Bayav 10, İlkan Karaman 9 Asts: Mire Chatman 4

Karşıyaka Arena, İzmir
Attendance: unknown

September 18
14:00 TSI

(Report)

Galatasaray MP	67–72	KK Budućnost Podgorica
Scoring by quarter: 14-14, 19-16, 19-19, 15-23
Pts: Furkan Aldemir 10, Jamon Gordon 9 Rebs: Furkan Aldemir 5, Lukša Andrić 5, Jamon Gordon 3 Asts: Jamon Gordon 4, Tutku Açık 4		Pts: Nikola Vučević 26, Bojan Krstović 12, Čedomir Vitkovac 10; Rebs: Nikola Vučević 7, Milivoje Božović 4, Čedomir Vitkovac 4 Asts: Jermaine Anderson 3

Karşıyaka Arena, İzmir
Attendance: unknown

Results

Pos.	Club
1	(Turkey) Galatasaray SK
2	(Germany) Alba Berlin
3	(Turkey) Pınar Karşıyaka
4	(Montenegro) KK Budućnost Podgorica

=== Euroleague 2011–12 ===
The higher ranked team hosted the second leg.

First qualifying round
1	(France) ASVEL Basket	80
8	(France) BCM Gravelines	72
4	(Greece) PAOK	64
5	(Turkey) Galatasaray MP	77
2	(Lithuania) Lietuvos Rytas	83
7	(Montenegro) KK Budućnost	64
3	(Croatia) Cibona Zagreb	77
6	(France) Cholet Basket	70

Second qualifying round
(France) ASVEL Basket	83
(Turkey) Galatasaray MP	93
(Lithuania) Lietuvos Rytas	88
(Croatia) Cibona Zagreb	71

Third qualifying round
(Turkey) Galatasaray MP	71
(Lithuania) Lietuvos Rytas	63

=== Group D ===
	Team	Pld	W	L	PF	PA	Diff	Tie-break
1.	(Spain) FC Barcelona	10	9	1	793	599	+194	
2.	(Italy) Montepaschi Siena	10	8	2	779	696	+83	
3.	(Russia) UNICS	10	7	3	702	656	+46	
4.	(Turkey) Galatasaray	10	4	6	694	736	−42	
5.	(Poland) Asseco Prokom	10	1	9	618	743	−125	1−1 (+7)
6.	(Slovenia) Union Olimpija	10	1	9	589	745	−156	1−1 (−7)

==== Qualifying rounds ====
September 30	PAOK BC	64–77	Galatasaray MP	Siemens Arena, Lithuania
18:00 TSI	Scoring by quarter: 18–15, 14–19, 19–26, 13–17
	Pts: Marcus Goree 17, Ioannis Kalampokis 16, Rashad Wright 11; Rebs: Dimos Dikoudis 8, Marcus Goree 6 Asts: Rashad Wright 3	(Report)	Pts: Lukša Andrić 15, Furkan Aldemir 11, Jamon Gordon 21, Ender Arslan 14; Rebs: Josh Ship 6, Furkan Aldemir 11; Asts: Tutku Açık 7	Attendance: 1000; Referees: JUNGEBRAND, CARL (FIN), ROCHA, FERNANDO (POR), REITER, MORITZ (GER)

October 1	ASVEL Basket	83–93	Galatasaray MP	Siemens Arena, Lithuania
20:00 TSI	Scoring by quarter: 23–28, 28–24, 15–17, 17–24
	Pts: Léo Westermann 18, Dijon Thompson 17, Phill Goss 13, H. Armstrong 11; Rebs: H. Armstrong 11; Asts: Lacombe 3	(Report)	Pts: Lakovič 22, D. Songaila 18, Cevher Özer 12, Andrić 11, Josh Ship 11; Rebs: Josh Ship 8, D. Songaila 5 Asts: Tutku Açık 6, Ender Arslan 5, Lakovič 3, Jamon Gordon 3	Attendance: 450; Referees: ROCHA, FERNANDO (POR), ZAMOJSKI, JAKUB (POL), MANTYLA, PETRI (FIN)

October 2	Lietuvos Rytas	63–71	Galatasaray MP	Siemens Arena, Lithuania
19:00 TSI	Scoring by quarter: 21–13, 7–17, 12–22, 23-19
	Pts: Renaldas Seibutis 15, Goran Jeretin 12, Steponas Babrauskas 10; Rebs: Lawrence Roberts 9, Jonas Valančiūnas 5 Asts: Tyrese Rice 4	(Report)	Pts: Preston Shumpert 14, Josh Ship 12, Andrić 12, Lakovič 10; Rebs: Josh Ship 6, Furkan Aldemir 6 Asts: Lakovič 5	Attendance: 8400; Referees: Carl Jungebrand (FIN), Boris Ryzhyk (UKR), Fernando Rocha (POR)

==== Regular season ====
19 October 2011
20:45

Report

Asseco Prokom Gdynia (Poland)	72–76	(Turkey) Galatasaray MP
Scoring by quarter: 19–21, 18–11, 11–27, 24–17
Pts: Motiejūnas, Hrycaniuk 15, Oliver Lafayette 12, Alonzo Gee 10; Rebs: Gee 9, Donatas Mateijunas 5 Asts: Motiejūnas 4		Pts: Lakovič 21, Preston Shumpert 12, Andrić 11; Rebs: Josh Ship 6, Andrić 4, Furkan Aldemir 4, D. Songaila 4 Asts: Jamon Gordon 6, Lakovič 4, Ender Arslan 4

Gdynia Sports Arena, Gdynia
Attendance: 3,200
Referees: Jose Martin (ESP), Antonio Conde (ESP), Nicola Maestre (FRA)

October 27
16:00 TSI

(Report)

Galatasaray MP	64–68	BC UNIKS
Scoring by quarter: 21–12, 14–16, 15–17, 14–23
Pts: Andrić 14, Josh Ship 11, D. Songaila 10; Rebs: Andrić 7, Furkan Aldemir 5 Asts: Lakovič 4, Ender Arslan 4		Pts: Henry Domercant 16, Lynn Greer 12; Rebs: Vladimir Veremeenko 7, Aleksey Savrasenko 7 Asts: Lynn Greer 4

Abdi İpekçi Arena, Istanbul
Attendance: 6,250
Referees: Zoran Sutulovic [MNE], Gianluca Mattioli [ITA], Sasa Maricic [SRB]

November 2–3
19:00 TSI

(Report)

Montepaschi Siena	103–77	Galatasaray MP
Scoring by quarter: 30–16, 20–21, 26–17, 27-23
Pts: Rimentas Kaukenas 24, Bo Mccalebb 19, David Andersen 13; Rebs: David Andersen 6, Pietro Aradori 6 Asts: Bo Mccalebb 4		Pts: Andrić 12, Ender Arslan 11, Josh Ship 10, Preston Shumpert 10; Rebs: Josh Ship 8, Preston Shumpert 5 Asts: Jamon Gordon 5

Palasport Mens Sana, Italy
Attendance: 4,696
Referees: CHRISTODOULOU, CHRISTOS (GRE), JOVCIC, MILIVOJE (SRB), ANASTOPOULOS, PANAGIOTIS (GRE)

November 9
19:00 TSI

(Report)

KK Union Olimpija	70–79	Galatasaray MP
Scoring by quarter: 23–27, 14–17, 19–13, 14-22
Pts: Ćapin 15, Varda 14, Thompson 11; Rebs: Markota 9 Asts: Ćapin 3, Green 3		Pts: Furkan Aldemir 18, Josh Ship 17, Preston Shumpert 11, D. Songaila 10; Rebs: Furkan Aldemir 11; Asts: Lakovič 5

Arena Stožice, Slovenia
Attendance: 7500 (Tentative)
Referees: J.C. Garcia Gonzalez (ESP), Robert Vyklicky (CZE), Ioannis Foufis (GRE)

November 17
20:00 TSI

(Report)

Galatasaray MP	66–70	FC Barcelona Bàsquet
Scoring by quarter: 19–19, 10–25, 19–17, 18–9
Pts: Andrić 17; Rebs: Josh Ship 6 Asts: Tutku Açık 3		Pts: Erazem Lorbek 14, Juan Navarro 12, Pete Mickeal 10; Rebs: Pete Mickeal 5 Asts: Marcelinho Huertas 4

Abdi İpekçi Arena, Istanbul
Attendance: 12,500
Referees: Sasa Pukl, Robert Lottermoser, Boris Shulga

November 24
20:00 TSI

(Report)

Galatasaray MP	78–76 (OT)	Asseco Prokom
Scoring by quarter: 12–14, 22–17, 12–26, 24–13, Overtime: 8-6
Pts: Zaza Pachulia 19, Preston Shumpert 13, Jamon Gordon 12, Darius Songaila 10; Rebs: Zaza Pachulia 10, Preston Shumpert 7 Asts: Ender Arslan5		Pts: D. Moteijunas 22, O. Lafayette 18, P. Zamojski 15; Rebs: D. Moteijunas 10; Asts: J. Blassingame 8

Abdi İpekçi Arena, Istanbul
Attendance: 4,585
Referees: HIERREZUELO, DANI [ESP], HERCEG, SINISA [CRO], MIKHAYLOV, SERGEY [RUS]

1 December 2011
16:00

Report

UNICS Kazan (Russia)	72–61	(Turkey) Galatasaray Medical Park
Scoring by quarter: 21–23, 14–11, 22–15, 15–12
Pts: Lyday 17; Rebs: Veremeenko 7 Asts: Greer 4		Pts: Lakovič 12; Rebs: Shipp, Pachulia 6 Asts: Gordon, Açık 3

Basket Hall Arena, Kazan
Attendance: 4,000
Referees: Ilija Belosevic (SRB), Eddie Viator (FRA), Damir Javor (SLO)

8 December 2011
19:00

Report

Galatasaray Medical Park (Turkey)	63–67	(Italy) Montepaschi Siena
Scoring by quarter: 18–19, 15–13, 10–18, 20–17
Pts: Lakovič 15; Rebs: Andric 7 Asts: Gordon 3		Pts: Andersen 18; Rebs: Andersen 8 Asts: Zisis 9

Abdi İpekçi Arena, Istanbul
Attendance: 11,300
Referees: Juan Carlos Arteaga (ESP), Boris Ryzhyk (UKR), Tasos Piloidis (GRE)

14 December 2011
18:15

Report

Galatasaray Medical Park (Turkey)	80–59	(Slovenia) Union Olimpija Ljubljana
Scoring by quarter: 18–16, 21–19, 20–9, 21–15
Pts: Lakovič 16; Rebs: Shipp 8 Asts: Gordon 8		Pts: Thompson 21; Rebs: Rothbart, Thompson 7 Asts: Kastrati, Močnik 3

Abdi İpekçi Arena, Istanbul
Attendance: 5,890
Referees: Antonio Conde (ESP), Marek Cmikiewicz (POL), Marko Juras (SRB)

21 December 2011
20:45

Report

FC Barcelona Regal (Spain)	79–50	(Turkey) Galatasaray Medical Park
Scoring by quarter: 23–13, 28–17, 17–11, 11–9
Pts: N'Dong 16; Rebs: Mickeal 7 Asts: Sada 4		Pts: Özer 11; Rebs: Shipp, Gordon 4 Asts: Lakovič 3

Palau Blaugrana, Barcelona
Attendance: 3,446
Referees: Carl Jungebrand (FIN), Spiros Gkontas (GRE), Tomasz Trawicki (POL)

=== Top 16 Group E ===
Key to colors
Top two places in each group advance to Quarterfinals

	Team	Pld	W	L	PF	PA	Diff	Tie-break
1.	(Russia) CSKA Moscow	6	5	1	509	413	+96	
2.	(Greece) Olympiacos	6	3	3	457	471	−14	1−1 (+6)
3.	(Turkey) Galatasaray	6	3	3	423	438	−15	1−1 (−6)
4.	(Turkey) Anadolu Efes	6	1	5	387	454	−67	

==== Matches ====
January 19, 2012 1	Anadolu Efes (Turkey)	68–62	(Turkey) Galatasaray Medical Park	Sinan Erdem Dome, Istanbul
19:30	Scoring by quarter: 29–19, 16–15, 15–18, 8–10
	Pts: Vujačić 17; Rebs: Savanović 17; Asts: Tunçeri 7	Report	Pts: Andric 14; Rebs: Gordon 9 Asts: Shipp 5	Attendance: 9,600; Referees: Dani Hierrezuelo (ESP), Matej Boltauzer (SLO), Boris Shulga (UKR)

January 26, 2012 2	Galatasaray Medical Park (Turkey)	78–77(OT)	(Greece) Olympiacos	Abdi İpekçi Arena, Istanbul
19:30	Scoring by quarter: 15-15, 27–13, 15–19, 12–22, Overtime: 9–8
	Pts: Gordon 17; Rebs: Shipp 5 Asts: Arslan 4	Report	Pts: Spanoulis 24; Rebs: Spanoulis 6 Asts: Hines 4	Attendance: 11,300; Referees: Paolo Taurino (ITA), Emilio Perez Pizarro (ESP), Juan Carlos Arteaga (ESP)

February 2, 2012 3	CSKA Moscow (Russia)	85–70	(Turkey) Galatasaray Medical Park	CSKA Universal Sports Hall, Moscow
17:15	Scoring by quarter: 19–12, 25–25, 22–15, 19–18
	Pts: Krstić 20; Rebs: Krstić 9 Asts: Khryapa 6	Report	Pts: Gordon 15; Rebs: Aldemir 9 Asts: Gordon 5	Attendance: 4,560; Referees: Ilija Belosevic (SRB), Dubravko Muhvic (CRO), Jakub Zamojski (POL)

February 9, 2012 4	Galatasaray Medical Park (Turkey)	68–64	(Russia) CSKA Moscow	Abdi İpekçi Arena, Istanbul
19:00	Scoring by quarter: 15–13, 16–23, 24–18, 13–10
	Pts: Shipp 22; Rebs: Andric 7 Asts: Gordon 5	Report	Pts: Shved, Kaun 11; Rebs: Three players 5 Asts: Teodosić, Šiškauskas 4	Attendance: 11,300; Referees: Jose Martin (ESP), Antonio Conde (ESP), Roberto Chiari (ITA)

February 22, 2012 5	Galatasaray Medical Park (Turkey)	64–56	(Turkey) Anadolu Efes	Abdi İpekçi Arena, Istanbul
19:30	Scoring by quarter: 20–13, 19–19, 11–13, 14–11
	Pts: Andric 15; Rebs: Savović 8 Asts: Arslan 3	Report	Pts: Barać 16; Rebs: Vujačić, Savanović 8 Asts: Tunçeri 5	Attendance: 11,300; Referees: Grzegorz Ziemblicki (POL), Milija Vojinovic (SRB), Olegs Latisevs (LAT)

March 1, 2012 6	Olympiacos (Greece)	88–81	(Turkey) Galatasaray Medical Park	Peace and Friendship Stadium, Piraeus
20:45	Scoring by quarter: 24–14, 19–21, 24–23, 21–23
	Pts: Spanoulis 20; Rebs: Antić 6 Asts: Spanoulis 8	Report	Pts: Andrić 15; Rebs: Andrić, Aldemir 6 Asts: Arslan 6	Attendance: 7000; Referees: Juan Carlos Arteaga, Guerrino Cerebuch, Vicente Bultó

=== Turkish Basketball League 2011–12 ===
==== Regular season ====
October 15
15:00 TSI

(Report)

Olin Edirne	71–98	Galatasaray MP
Scoring by quarter: 23–33, 14–18, 14–26, 20-21
Pts: Christopher Wright 20, Wesley Wilkinson 15, Vladimir Stimac 12; Rebs: Vladimir Stimac 9 Asts: Christopher Wright 4		Pts: Songaila 19, Lakovic 13, Shumpert 12, Pachulia 11, Gordon 10; Rebs: Pachulia 5, Songaila 4 Asts: Ender Arslan 4

Mimar Sinan Sports Hall, Edirne
Attendance: unknown
Referees: Erşan Kartal, Murat Ciner, Mehmet Serdar Ünal

October 22
15:00 TSI

(Report)

Galatasaray MP	84–73	Banvit B.K.
Scoring by quarter: 26–20, 22–15, 19–28, 18–10
Pts: Josh Ship 22, Furkan Aldemir 9 Rebs: Furkan Aldemir 7 Asts: Tutku Açık 7		Pts: Charles Davis 22, Lance Williams 9, Barış Ermiş 13; Rebs: Lance Williams 5 Asts: Barış Ermiş 4

Abdi İpekçi Arena, Istanbul
Attendance: none
Referees: Recep Ankaralı, Alper Özgök, Osman Sinan İşgüder

October 29
16:00 TSI

(Report)

Galatasaray MP	79–72	Pınar Karşıyaka
Scoring by quarter: 19–29, 25–14, 19–15, 16–14
Pts: Mert Shumpert 22, Ender Arslan 13, Darius Songalia 12; Rebs: Mert Shumpert 4 Asts: Gordon 6		Pts: Goran Ikonic 15, Jovo Stanojevic 14, İlkan Karaman 14; Rebs: Jovo Stanojevic 8, İlkan Karaman 6 Asts: Mire Chatman 7

Abdi İpekçi Arena, Istanbul
Attendance: none
Referees: Erşan Kartal, Halil Baldemir, Serdar Ünal

November 5
13:30 TSI

(Report)

Hacettepe Üniversitesi	68–86	Galatasaray MP
Scoring by quarter: 23–27, 15–20, 12–18, 18-21
Pts: Furkan Aldemir 17, Mert Shumpert 15, Jaka Lakovic 14; Rebs: Furkan Aldemir 9, Mert Shumpert 5 Asts: Tutku Açık 7, Jamon Gordon 4		Pts: Melvin Sanders 17, Matthew Amaning 16, Murat Kaya 11; Rebs: Melvin Sanders 11, Matthew Amaning 7 Asts: Sherron Collins 5

Ankara Arena, Ankara
Attendance: unknown
Referees: Aytuğ Ekti, Serkan Emlek, Tunçtan Durmuşcan

November 13
17:30 TSI

(Report)

Galatasaray MP	61–69	Anadolu Efes
Scoring by quarter: 19–23, 13–14, 18–19, 11–13
Pts: Mert Shumpert 13, Zaza Pachulia 12, Jaka Lakovic 10, Furkan Aldemir 10; Rebs: Furkan Aldemir 4, Mert Shumpert 4 Asts: Gordon 4		Pts: Stanko Barac 14, Kerem Tunçeri 13, Ersan İlyasova 10; Rebs: Ersan İlyasova 7 Asts: Kerem Tunçeri 6

Abdi İpekçi Arena, Istanbul
Attendance: 12,538
Referees: Engin Kennerman, Fatih Arslanoğlu, Yener Yılmaz

November 20
15:00 TSI

(Report)

Tofaş S.K.	75–95	Galatasaray MP
Scoring by quarter: 9–24, 20–26, 19–23, 27-22
Pts: Bradley Buckman 20, Ronald Steele Jr. 15, Žuža 14; Rebs: Bradley Buckman 6 Asts: Kenan Sipahi 5		Pts: Gordon 15, Luksa Andric 13, Cevher Özer 12, Josh Ship 12; Rebs: Josh Ship 6, Cevher Özer 4 Asts: Ender Arslan 4, Tutku Açık 6

Atatürk Spor Salonu, Bursa
Attendance: unknown
Referees: Mehmet Keseratar, Can Atsüren, Alper Özgök

November 27
16:00 TSI

(Report)

Galatasaray MP	87–67	Trabzonspor Basketball
Scoring by quarter: 22–11, 27–17, 13–21, 25–18
Pts: Mert Shumpert 17, Josh Ship 12, Jaka Lakovic 12, Gordon 11, Zaza Pachulia 11; Rebs: Zaza Pachulia 12; Asts: Jaka Lakovic 4		Pts: Jonathan Gibson 22, Ellon Brown Jr. 12, Fahri Kaan Üner 10; Rebs: Ellon Brown Jr. 7 Asts: Ellon Brown Jr. 2

Abdi İpekçi Arena, Istanbul
Attendance: unknown
Referees: Aytuğ Ekti, Ali Şakacı, Osman Sinan İşgüder

December 4
13:30 TSI

(Report)

Antalya Büyükşehir Belediyesi	76–88	Galatasaray MP
Scoring by quarter: 13–26, 22–23, 15–19, 26-20
Pts: Anthony Fisher 16, Stevan Jelovac 15; Rebs: Stevan Jelovac 8, Bora Hun Paçun 8, Albert Brown 8 Asts: Anthony Fisher 6		Pts: Josh Ship 16, Darius Songaila 15, Jaka Lakovic 12, Jamon Gordon 10; Rebs: Josh Ship 5, Darius Songaila 5 Asts: Jamon Gordon 6, Mert Shumpert 6

Antalya Atatürk Spor Salonu, Antalya
Attendance: unknown
Referees: Özlem Yalman, Alper Altuğ Köselerli, Yücel Çilingir

December 10
15:00 TSI

(Report)

Galatasaray MP	74–55	Bandırma Kırmızı
Scoring by quarter: 27–19, 13–12, 15–13, 19–11
Pts: Jamon Gordon 11; Rebs: Cevher Özer 6, Darius Songaila 6 Asts: Ender Arslan 3		Pts: Gary Jerome Mc Ghee 14, İbrahim Yıldırım 12; Rebs: Gary Jerome Mc Ghee 8 Asts: Tufan Önen 3

Abdi İpekçi Arena, Istanbul
Attendance: unknown
Referees: Serkan Emlek, Ozan Çakar, Önder Yilmaz

December 17
19:30 TSI

(Report)

Beşiktaş Milangaz	73–65	Galatasaray MP
Scoring by quarter: 22–24, 16–15, 21–12, 14-14
Pts: David Hawkins 21, Zoran Herceg 17, Mensah Bonsu 12; Rebs: Mensah Bonsu 13; Asts: David Hawkins 6		Pts: Ender Arslan 14; Rebs: Luksa Andric 7 Asts: Jamon Gordon 7

Sinan Erdem Spor Salonu, Istanbul
Attendance: unknown
Referees: Murat Biricik, Halil Baldemir, Ahmet Ersan Ergüler

December 25
13:00 TSI

(Report)

Galatasaray MP	82–75	Türk Telekom B.K.
Scoring by quarter: 29–15, 18–23, 19–13, 14–24
Pts: Darius Songaila 16, Jamon Gordon 13; Rebs: Furkan Aldemir 10; Asts: Jamon Gordon 7		Pts: Ali Karadeniz 19; Rebs: Ali Karadeniz 8 Asts: Muratcan Güler 5

Abdi İpekçi Arena, Istanbul
Attendance: unknown
Referees: Engin Kennerman, Serkan Emlek, Uğur Özen

December 30
20:00 TSI

(Report)

Fenerbahçe Ülker	80–79	Galatasaray MP
Scoring by quarter: 17–21, 15–15, 25–27, 23-16
Pts: Engin Atsür 16, James Gist 14, Oğuz Savaş 14; Rebs: James Gist 8, Oğuz Savaş 9 Asts: Oğuz Savaş 2		Pts: Jaka Lakovic 12, Luksa Andric 12; Rebs: Jamon Gordon 7 Asts: Jamon Gordon 5

Sinan Erdem Spor Salonu, Istanbul
Attendance: unknown
Referees: Recep Ankaralı, İsmail Aydın, Mehmet Serdar Ünal

January 4
TSI

Galatasaray MP	105–67	Mersin Büyükşehir Belediyesi S.K.

Attendance: unknown

January 7
TSI

Erdemirspor	75–83	Galatasaray MP

Attendance: unknown

January 15
TSI

Galatasaray MP	90–72	Aliağa Petkim

Attendance: unknown

January 29
TSI

Galatasaray MP	63–58	Olin Edirne Basket

Attendance: unknown

February 12
TSI

Pınar Karşıyaka	65–75	Galatasaray MP

Attendance: unknown

February 25
TSI

Galatasaray MP	83–46	Hacettepe Üniversitesi B.K.

Attendance: unknown

March 4
TSI

Anadolu Efes S.K.	65–74	Galatasaray MP

Attendance: unknown

March 7
TSI

Galatasaray MP	103–102	Tofaş S.K.

Attendance: unknown

March 10
TSI

Trabzonspor Basketball	77–88	Galatasaray MP

Attendance: unknown

March 14
TSI

Banvit B.K.	64–73	Galatasaray MP

Attendance: unknown

March 17
TSI

Galatasaray MP	82–92	Antalya Büyükşehir Belediyesi

Attendance: unknown

March 24
TSI

Bandırma Kırmızı	68–79	Galatasaray MP

Attendance: unknown

April 2
TSI

Galatasaray MP	92–81	Beşiktaş men's basketball team

Attendance: unknown

April 6
TSI

Türk Telekom B.K.	74–82	Galatasaray MP

Attendance: unknown

April 11
TSI

Galatasaray MP	84–72	Fenerbahçe Men's Basketball

Attendance: unknown

April 14
TSI

Mersin Büyükşehir Belediyesi S.K.	106–99	Galatasaray MP

Attendance: unknown

April 21
TSI

Galatasaray MP	85–71	Erdemirspor

Attendance: unknown

April 29
TSI

Aliağa Petkim	83–85	Galatasaray MP

Attendance: unknown

== Turkish Cup 2011–12 ==
=== Qualification round ===
October 6, 2011
18:00 TSI

(Report)

Galatasaray MP	89–67	Antalya BŞB
Scoring by quarter: 16–12, 21–17, 30–25, 22–13
Pts: Josh Shipp 16, Caner Topaloğlu 13, Preston Shumpert 13, Rebs: Furkan Aldemir 9 Asts: Jaka Lakovic 5		Pts: Stevan Jelovac 25, Melih Mahmutoğlu 20; Rebs: Stevan Jelovac 7, Deangelo David Lincoln 6 Asts: Gökper Gen 2

Yaşar Doğu Spor Salonu, Samsun
Attendance: unknown
Referees: Zafer Yılmaz, Ali Şakacı, Aydın Karaçam

October 7, 2011
16:00 TSI

(Report)

Galatasaray MP	68–65	Erdemir SK
Scoring by quarter: 20–17, 21–11, 12–18, 15–19
Pts: Preston Shumpert 12, Furkan Aldemir 12, Ender Arslan 10; Rebs: Luksa Andric 10, Josh Shipp 8 Asts: Ender Arslan 7		Pts: Kzell Ray Wesson 16, Antwayne Fredrick 12; Rebs: Kzell Ray Wesson 9 Asts: Gerrord Dewayne Henderson 5

Yaşar Doğu Spor Salonu, Samsun
Attendance: unknown
Referees: Özlem Yalman, Sami Özel, Aydın Karaçam

October 8, 2011
16:00 TSI

(Report)

Galatasaray MP	83–60	Bandırma Kırmızı
Scoring by quarter: 33–17, 16–14, 17–10, 17–19
Pts: Furkan Aldemir 18, Jaka Lakovic 12; Rebs: Furkan Aldemir 9, Darius Songaila 7 Asts: Furkan Aldemir 3, Jaka Lakovic 5		Pts: Şafak Edge 19, Ahmet Fatih Cantitiz 15; Rebs: Gary Jerome Mc Ghee 7 Asts: Şafak Edge 3

Yaşar Doğu Spor Salonu, Samsun
Attendance: unknown
Referees: Özlem Yalman, Ozan Çakar, Altuğ Köselerli

==== Group D ====
	Team	Pld	W	L	PF	PA	Pts
1.	(Turkey) Galatasaray MP	3	3	0	240	192	6
2.	(Turkey) Antalya BŞB	3	1	2	256	268	4
3.	(Turkey) Erdemir SK	3	1	2	232	234	4
4.	(Turkey) Bandırma Kırmızı	3	1	2	205	239	4

==== Final eight ====
February 15, 2012
20:15 TSI

Galatasaray MP	vs.	Antalya BŞB

Selçuklu Sports Hall, Selçuklu, Konya

== President's Cup 2011–12 ==
October 12
18:30 TSI

(Report)

Galatasaray MP	103–97 (OT)	Fenerbahçe Ülker
Scoring by quarter: 21–19, 17–20, 20–15, 20–24, Overtime: 7-7; 25-19
Pts: Shumpert 22, Andrić 22, Ender 18, Furkan 10; Rebs: Jamon Gordon 8, Andrić 7 Asts: Tutku 8, Ender 7, Jamon Gordon 6		Pts: Bojan Bogdanović 21, Emir Preldžič 17, James Gist 18; Rebs: James Gist 9, Emir Preldžič 6 Asts: Emir Preldžič 10

Kadir Has Spor Salonu, Kayseri
Attendance: 7200
Referees: Rüştü Nuran, Yener Yılmaz, Ali Şakacı
