= 2011–12 Euroleague Regular Season Group D =

Basketball season results

Standings and Results for Group D of the Regular Season phase of the 2011–12 Euroleague basketball tournament.

== Standings ==
Key to colors
| Top four places in each group advance to Top 16 |

| | Team | Pld | W | L | PF | PA | Diff | Tie-break |
|---|---|---|---|---|---|---|---|---|
| 1. | (Spain) FC Barcelona | 10 | 9 | 1 | 793 | 599 | +194 | |
| 2. | (Italy) Montepaschi Siena | 10 | 8 | 2 | 779 | 696 | +83 | |
| 3. | (Russia) UNICS | 10 | 7 | 3 | 702 | 656 | +46 | |
| 4. | (Turkey) Galatasaray | 10 | 4 | 6 | 694 | 736 | −42 | |
| 5. | (Poland) Asseco Prokom | 10 | 1 | 9 | 618 | 743 | −125 | 1−1 (+7) |
| 6. | (Slovenia) Union Olimpija | 10 | 1 | 9 | 589 | 745 | −156 | 1−1 (−7) |

== Fixtures and results ==
All times given below are in Central European Time.

=== Game 1 ===
19 October 2011
18:00

Report

| UNICS (Russia) | 71–79 | (Italy) Montepaschi Siena |
Scoring by quarter: 24–20, 20–23, 11–21, 16–15
| Pts: Domercant 30; Rebs: Jawai 9 Asts: four players 2 | | Pts: McCalebb 17; Rebs: Stonerook 8 Asts: McCalebb, Zisis 4 |

Basket Hall Arena, Kazan
Attendance: 4,500
Referees: Ilija Belosevic (SRB), Matej Boltauzer (SLO), Tomas Trawicki (POL)

19 October 2011
20:45

Report

| Asseco Prokom (Poland) | 72–76 | (Turkey) Galatasaray |
Scoring by quarter: 19–21, 18–11, 11–27, 24–17
| Pts: Motiejūnas, Hrycaniuk 15; Rebs: Gee 9 Asts: Motiejūnas 4 | | Pts: Lakovič 21; Rebs: Shipp 6 Asts: Gordon 6 |

Gdynia Sports Arena, Gdynia
Attendance: 3,200
Referees: José Martín (ESP), Antonio Conde (ESP), Nicola Maestre (FRA)

20 October 2011
20:45

Report

| Union Olimpija (Slovenia) | 64–86 | (Spain) Barcelona |
Scoring by quarter: 19–24, 11–17, 21–20, 13–25
| Pts: Green 17; Rebs: Markota 8 Asts: three players 2 | | Pts: Huertas 17; Rebs: Perović 9 Asts: Huertas 8 |

Arena Stožice, Ljubljana
Attendance: 10,200
Referees: Fernando Rocha (POR), Tolga Sahin (ITA), Rustu Nuran (TUR)

=== Game 2 ===
27 October 2011
19:00

Report

| Galatasaray (Turkey) | 64–68 | (Russia) UNICS |
Scoring by quarter: 21–12, 14–16, 15–17, 14–23
| Pts: Andrić 14; Rebs: Andrić 7 Asts: Lakovič, Arslan 4 | | Pts: Domercant 16; Rebs: Veremeenko, Savrasenko 7 Asts: Greer 4 |

Abdi İpekçi Arena, Istanbul
Attendance: 6,250
Referees: Zoran Šutulović (MNE), Gianluca Mattioli (ITA), Sasa Maricic (SRB)

27 October 2011
20:00

Report

| Montepaschi Siena (Italy) | 79–57 | (Slovenia) Union Olimpija |
Scoring by quarter: 26–4, 12–25, 23–11, 18–17
| Pts: McCalebb 17; Rebs: Stonerook 9 Asts: Zisis 5 | | Pts: Bertāns 12; Rebs: Murić, Green 5 Asts: Green 3 |

Palasport Mens Sana, Siena
Attendance: 4,696
Referees: Miguel Perez Perez (ESP), Oscar Perea (ESP), Marcin Kowalski (POL)

27 October 2011
20:45

Report

| FC Barcelona Regal (Spain) | 88–61 | (Poland) Asseco Prokom |
Scoring by quarter: 23–18, 24–18, 17–10, 24–15
| Pts: Lorbek 20; Rebs: Eidson 7 Asts: Huertas, Navarro 5 | | Pts: Lafayette 15; Rebs: Lapeta, Hrycaniuk 5 Asts: Blassingame 4 |

Palau Blaugrana, Barcelona
Attendance: 3,724
Referees: Sreten Radovic (CRO), Roberto Chiari (ITA), Moritz Reiter (GER)

=== Game 3 ===
2 November 2011
20:45

Report

| Montepaschi Siena (Italy) | 103–77 | (Turkey) Galatasaray |
Scoring by quarter: 30–16, 20–21, 26–17, 27–23
| Pts: Kaukėnas 24; Rebs: Andersen, Aradori 6 Asts: McCalebb 4 | | Pts: Andrić 12; Rebs: Shipp 8 Asts: Gordon 5 |

Palasport Mens Sana, Siena
Attendance: 4,696
Referees: Christos Christodoulou (GRE), Milivoje Jovcic (SRB), Panagiotis Anastopoulos (GRE)

2 November 2011
20:45

Report

| Union Olimpija (Slovenia) | 70–62 | (Poland) Asseco Prokom |
Scoring by quarter: 25–16, 15–17, 18–14, 12–15
| Pts: Green 23; Rebs: Rothbart 8 Asts: Woodside 4 | | Pts: Gee 13; Rebs: Hrycaniuk 8 Asts: Blassingame 3 |

Arena Stožice, Ljubljana
Attendance: 6,500
Referees: Carl Jungebrand (FIN), Seffi Shemmesh (ISR), Boris Shulga (UKR)

3 November 2011
17:00

Report

| UNICS (Russia) | 65–93 | (Spain) FC Barcelona Regal |
Scoring by quarter: 14–23, 18–21, 16–25, 17–24
| Pts: Lyday 14; Rebs: three players 4 Asts: Greer 2 | | Pts: Lorbek 24; Rebs: Mickeal 6 Asts: Huertas 8 |

Basket Hall Arena, Kazan
Attendance: 7,000
Referees: Luigi Lamonica (ITA), Paolo Taurino (ITA), Sinisa Herceg (CRO)

=== Game 4 ===
9 November 2011
19:00

Report

| Union Olimpija (Slovenia) | 70–79 | (Turkey) Galatasaray |
Scoring by quarter: 23–27, 14–17, 19–13, 14–22
| Pts: Ćapin 15; Rebs: Markota 9 Asts: Ćapin, Green 3 | | Pts: Aldemir 18; Rebs: Aldemir 11; Asts: Lakovič 5 |

Arena Stožice, Ljubljana
Attendance: 7,500
Referees: J.C. Garcia Gonzalez (ESP), Robert Vyklicky (CZE), Ioannis Foufis (GRE)

9 November 2011
20:45

Report

| Asseco Prokom (Poland) | 68–72 | (Russia) UNICS |
Scoring by quarter: 12–17, 18–12, 16–16, 22–27
| Pts: Motiejūnas 19; Rebs: Motiejūnas 9 Asts: Blassingame 8 | | Pts: Domercant 23; Rebs: Savrasenko 7 Asts: three players 3 |

Gdynia Sports Arena, Gdynia
Attendance: 2,700
Referees: Guerrino Cerebuch (ITA), Recep Ankarali (TUR), Jurgis Laurinavicius (LTU)

10 November 2011
20:45

Report

| FC Barcelona Regal (Spain) | 92–75 | (Italy) Montepaschi Siena |
Scoring by quarter: 24–12, 16–16, 23–22, 29–25
| Pts: Eidson 22; Rebs: N'Dong 7 Asts: Huertas 9 | | Pts: McCalebb 20; Rebs: Lavrinovič 8 Asts: Rakočević 5 |

Palau Blaugrana, Barcelona
Attendance: 5,617
Referees: Grzegorz Ziemblicki (POL), Eddie Viator (FRA), Milija Vojinovic (SRB)

=== Game 5 ===
17 November 2011
18:00

Report

| UNICS (Russia) | 81–51 | (Slovenia) Union Olimpija |
Scoring by quarter: 18–20, 21–14, 22–5, 20–12
| Pts: Lyday 22; Rebs: Domercant 7 Asts: Domercant 3 | | Pts: Varda 13; Rebs: Woodside 5 Asts: Ćapin, Green 3 |

Basket Hall Arena, Kazan
Attendance: 4,000
Referees: Boris Ryzhyk (UKR), Srdan Dozai (CRO), Oliver Krause (GER)

17 November 2011
19:00

Report

| Galatasaray (Turkey) | 66–70 | (Spain) FC Barcelona Regal |
Scoring by quarter: 19–19, 10–25, 19–17, 18–9
| Pts: Andric 17; Rebs: Shipp 6 Asts: Açık 3 | | Pts: Lorbek 14; Rebs: Mickeal 5 Asts: Huertas 4 |

Abdi İpekçi Arena, Istanbul
Attendance: 11,300
Referees: Sasa Pukl (SLO), Robert Lottermoser (GER), Boris Shulga (UKR)

17 November 2011
20:00

Report

| Montepaschi Siena (Italy) | 84–73 | (Poland) Asseco Prokom |
Scoring by quarter: 16–15, 16–16, 33–20, 19–22
| Pts: Kaukėnas 15; Rebs: Andersen 9 Asts: Kaukėnas 6 | | Pts: Motiejūnas 26; Rebs: Motiejūnas 9 Asts: Lafayette 7 |

Palasport Mens Sana, Siena
Attendance: 4,639
Referees: J.C. Garcia Gonzalez (ESP), Nicola Maestre (FRA), Rustu Nuran (TUR)

=== Game 6 ===
23 November 2011
20:45

Report

| Montepaschi Siena (Italy) | 73–79 | (Russia) UNICS |
Scoring by quarter: 16–21, 25–20, 20–16, 12–22
| Pts: McCalebb 22; Rebs: Lavrinovič, Ress 4 Asts: Zisis, Moss 2 | | Pts: Domercant 24; Rebs: Veremeenko 10; Asts: Samoylenko 4 |

Palasport Mens Sana, Siena
Attendance: 4675
Referees: J.R. Garcia Ortiz (ESP), Antonio Conde (ESP), Marko Juras (SRB)

24 November 2011
19:00

Report

| Galatasaray (Turkey) | 78–76 (OT) | (Poland) Asseco Prokom |
Scoring by quarter: 12–14, 22–17, 12–26, 24–13, Overtime: 8–6
| Pts: Pachulia 19; Rebs: Pachulia 10; Asts: Arslan 5 | | Pts: Motiejūnas 22; Rebs: Motiejūnas 10; Asts: Blassingame 8 |

Abdi İpekçi Arena, Istanbul
Attendance: 4,585
Referees: Daniel Hierrezuelo (ESP), Sinisa Herceg (CRO), Sergey Mikhaylov (RUS)

24 November 2011
20:45

Report

| FC Barcelona Regal (Spain) | 72–46 | (Slovenia) Union Olimpija |
Scoring by quarter: 23–16, 17–10, 23–6, 9–14
| Pts: Navarro 14; Rebs: Lorbek 7 Asts: Eidson 5 | | Pts: Ćapin, Green 10; Rebs: Green 5 Asts: Woodside 2 |

Palau Blaugrana, Barcelona
Attendance: 4,455
Referees: Recep Ankarali (TUR), Zdravko Rutesic (MNE), Sergio Silva (POR)

=== Game 7 ===
1 December 2011
16:00

Report

| UNICS (Russia) | 72–61 | (Turkey) Galatasaray |
Scoring by quarter: 21–23, 14–11, 22–15, 15–12
| Pts: Lyday 17; Rebs: Veremeenko 7 Asts: Greer 4 | | Pts: Lakovič 12; Rebs: Shipp, Pachulia 6 Asts: Gordon, Açık 3 |

Basket Hall Arena, Kazan
Attendance: 4,000
Referees: Ilija Belosevic (SRB), Eddie Viator (FRA), Damir Javor (SLO)

1 December 2011
19:00

Report

| Union Olimpija (Slovenia) | 57–63 | (Italy) Montepaschi Siena |
Scoring by quarter: 15–21, 18–16, 16–16, 8–10
| Pts: Woodside 11; Rebs: Markota 15; Asts: Markota 5 | | Pts: McCalebb 16; Rebs: Andersen 8 Asts: three players 1 |

Arena Stožice, Ljubljana
Attendance: 6,000
Referees: Sreten Radovic (CRO), Marius Ciulin (ROU), Sergey Chebyshev (UKR)

1 December 2011
20:45

Report

| Asseco Prokom (Poland) | 45–76 | (Spain) FC Barcelona Regal |
Scoring by quarter: 14–14, 12–22, 4–23, 15–17
| Pts: Seweryn 10; Rebs: Lapeta, Hrycaniuk 5 Asts: Lafayette 3 | | Pts: Sada 17; Rebs: Lorbek 8 Asts: Ingles 5 |

Gdynia Sports Arena, Gdynia
Attendance: 4,950
Referees: Fernando Rocha (POR), Spiros Gkontas (GRE), Petri Mäntylä (FIN)

=== Game 8 ===
7 December 2011
20:45

Report

| Asseco Prokom (Poland) | 67–52 | (Slovenia) Union Olimpija |
Scoring by quarter: 13–15, 14–15, 23–3, 17–19
| Pts: three players 12; Rebs: Motiejūnas 21; Asts: three players 3 | | Pts: Rothbart 16; Rebs: Rothbart 11; Asts: Ćapin 7 |

Gdynia Sports Arena, Gdynia
Attendance: 2,700
Referees: Dubravko Muhvic (CRO), Murat Biricik (TUR), Roberto Chiari (ITA)

8 December 2011
19:00

Report

| Galatasaray (Turkey) | 63–67 | (Italy) Montepaschi Siena |
Scoring by quarter: 18–19, 15–13, 10–18, 20–17
| Pts: Lakovič 15; Rebs: Andric 7 Asts: Gordon 3 | | Pts: Andersen 18; Rebs: Andersen 8 Asts: Zisis 9 |

Abdi İpekçi Arena, Istanbul
Attendance: 11,300
Referees: Juan Carlos Arteaga (ESP), Boris Ryzhyk (UKR), Tasos Piloidis (GRE)

8 December 2011
20:45

Report

| FC Barcelona Regal (Spain) | 63–50 | (Russia) UNICS |
Scoring by quarter: 21–15, 12–13, 14–15, 16–7
| Pts: Navarro 13; Rebs: Eidson 7 Asts: Huertas 4 | | Pts: Lyday 12; Rebs: Veremeenko, Domercant 5 Asts: Veremeenko 3 |

Palau Blaugrana, Barcelona
Attendance: 4,676
Referees: Sasa Pukl (SLO), Milija Vojinovic (SRB), Elias Koromilas (GRE)

=== Game 9 ===
14 December 2011
18:15

Report

| Galatasaray (Turkey) | 80–59 | (Slovenia) Union Olimpija |
Scoring by quarter: 18–16, 21–19, 20–9, 21–15
| Pts: Lakovič 16; Rebs: Shipp 8 Asts: Gordon 8 | | Pts: Thompson 21; Rebs: Rothbart, Thompson 7 Asts: Kastrati, Močnik 3 |

Abdi İpekçi Arena, Istanbul
Attendance: 5,890
Referees: Antonio Conde (ESP), Marek Cmikiewicz (POL), Marko Juras (SRB)

15 December 2011
17:00

Report

| UNICS (Russia) | 68–41 | (Poland) Asseco Prokom |
Scoring by quarter: 19–6, 16–5, 19–16, 14–14
| Pts: Domercant 18; Rebs: Jawai 9 Asts: Samoylenko 5 | | Pts: Blassingame 10; Rebs: Motiejūnas 6 Asts: Blassingame 4 |

Basket Hall Arena, Kazan
Attendance: 4,000
Referees: Matej Boltauzer (SLO), Sinisa Herceg (CRO), Marius Ciulin(ROM)

15 December 2011
20:45

Report

| Montepaschi Siena (Italy) | 77–74 | (Spain) FC Barcelona Regal |
Scoring by quarter: 23–20, 13–15, 11–24, 30–15
| Pts: Rakočević 21; Rebs: Andersen 12; Asts: Andersen 3 | | Pts: Lorbek 22; Rebs: Mickeal 6 Asts: Huertas 4 |

Palasport Mens Sana, Siena
Attendance: 4,852
Referees: Ilija Belosevic (SRB), Robert Lottermoser (GER), Eddie Viator (FRA)

=== Game 10 ===
21 December 2011
20:45

Report

| FC Barcelona Regal (Spain) | 79–50 | (Turkey) Galatasaray Medical Park |
Scoring by quarter: 23–13, 28–17, 17–11, 11–9
| Pts: N'Dong 16; Rebs: Mickeal 7 Asts: Sada 4 | | Pts: Özer 11; Rebs: Shipp, Gordon 4 Asts: Lakovič 3 |

Palau Blaugrana, Barcelona
Attendance: 3,446
Referees: Carl Jungebrand (FIN), Spiros Gkontas (GRE), Tomasz Trawicki (POL)

21 December 2011
20:45

Report

| Asseco Prokom (Poland) | 53–79 | (Italy) Montepaschi Siena |
Scoring by quarter: 16–18, 7–19, 21–13, 9–29
| Pts: Hrycaniuk 16; Rebs: Hrycaniuk 6 Asts: Lafayette 5 | | Pts: Aradori 23; Rebs: Andersen, Aradori 7 Asts: Zisis 6 |

Gdynia Sports Arena, Gdynia
Attendance: 2,800
Referees: J.R. Garcia Ortiz (ESP), Srdan Dozai (CRO), Radomir Vojinovic (MNE)

21 December 2011
20:45

Report

| Union Olimpija (Slovenia) | 63–73 | (Russia) UNICS |
Scoring by quarter: 11–25, 18–16, 12–13, 22–22
| Pts: Blažič 13; Rebs: Rothbart 10; Asts: Salin 4 | | Pts: Domercant 16; Rebs: Wilkinson, Domercant 5 Asts: Samoylenko 4 |

Arena Stožice, Ljubljana
Attendance: 3,500
Referees: Guerrino Cerebuch (ITA), Marcin Kowalski (POL), Panagiotis Anastopoulos (GRE)
