= 2012–13 Galatasaray S.K. (men's basketball) season =

Galatasaray Medical Park
2012–13 season
- Chairman: (Turkey) Ünal Aysal
- Head coach: (Turkey) Ergin Ataman
- Turkish Basketball League: Winner
- Turkish Cup: Runner-up
- Eurocup: Last 16
- Highest home attendance: 11,340 (vs Banvit, 15 June 2013)
- Average home attendance: 3,815

Galatasaray S.K. Men's 2012–2013 season is the 2012–2013 basketball season for Turkish professional basketball club Galatasaray Medical Park

The club competes in:

- Turkish Basketball League
- Eurocup
- Turkish Cup Basketball

== Players ==
=== Depth chart ===
Pos.	Starting 5	Bench 1	Reserve	Inactive
C	Furkan Aldemir	Boniface N'Dong	Sertaç Şanlı
PF	Erwin Dudley	Milan Mačvan	Doğukan Sönmez
SF	Manuchar Markoishvili	Cenk Akyol		Henry Domercant
SG	Jamont Gordon			Göksenin Köksal
PG	Carlos Arroyo	Ender Arslan	Can Korkmaz	Engin Atsür

=== Squad changes for the 2012–2013 season ===
In: Note: Flags indicate national team as defined under FIFA eligibility rules; some limited exceptions apply. Players may hold more than one non-FIFA nationality.

No.	Pos.	Nation	Player
5	G	USA	Jamont Gordon (from CSKA Moscow)
9	PF	GEO	Manuchar Markoishvili (from Lenovo Cantù)
14	PG	TUR	Engin Atsür (from Fenerbahçe Ülker)
17	SF	TUR	Cenk Akyol (from Anadolu Efes)
21	PF	SEN	Boniface N'Dong (from Barcelona Regal)
25	PF	SRB	Milan Mačvan (from Maccabi Tel Aviv)
30	PF	PUR	Carlos Arroyo (from Beşiktaş Milangaz)
34	SF	USA	David Hawkins (from Beşiktaş Milangaz)
35	PF	TUR	Erwin Dudley (from Beşiktaş Milangaz)
44	SG	BIH	Henry Domercant (from UNICS Kazan)

Out: Note: Flags indicate national team as defined under FIFA eligibility rules; some limited exceptions apply. Players may hold more than one non-FIFA nationality.

No.	Pos.	Nation	Player
4	SG	USA	Josh Shipp (to Anadolu Efes)
9	SG	TUR	Mert Shumpert (to Aliağa Petkim)
10	PG	SVN	Jaka Lakovič (from Sigidas Avellino)
11	PG	TUR	Tutku Açık (to Beşiktaş Milangaz)
12	C	CRO	Lukša Andrić (to Cedevita Zagreb)
14	SF	TUR	Haluk Yıldırım (Retired)
16	SG	TUR	Evren Büker (to Pınar Karşıyaka)
22	SG	USA	Jamon Gordon (to Anadolu Efes)
34	SF	USA	David Hawkins (Contract Terminated)
41	PF	TUR	Cevher Özer (to Beşiktaş Milangaz)
42	PF	SRB	Boris Savović (to KK Crvena zvezda)
44	SG	BIH	Nihad Đedović (to Alba Berlin)

== Competitions ==
=== Turkish Basketball League regular season ===
October 13

Antalya Büyükşehir Belediyesi	57–93	Galatasaray MP

October 20

Galatasaray MP	79–67	Aliağa Petkim

Abdi İpekçi Arena, Istanbul

October 29

Aliağa Petkim	73–83	Galatasaray MP

November 3

Galatasaray MP	81–62	Olin Edirne Basket

November 10

Erdemirspor	62–85	Galatasaray MP

November 17

Galatasaray MP	90–66	Erdemirspor

November 24

Galatasaray MP	84–73	Mersin Büyükşehir Belediyesi S.K.

December 2

Galatasaray MP	64–60	Beşiktaş men's basketball team

December 8

Pınar Karşıyaka	72–69	Galatasaray MP

December 15

Galatasaray MP	71–61	Tofaş S.K.

December 19

Fenerbahçe Men's Basketball	74–67	Galatasaray MP

December 22

Galatasaray MP	84–66	Royal Halı Gaziantep

December 30

Banvit B.K.	67–74	Galatasaray MP

January 5

Galatasaray MP	83–62	Hacettepe Üniversitesi B.K.

January 12

Türk Telekom B.K.	70–76	Galatasaray MP

January 27

Galatasaray MP	85–65	Antalya Büyükşehir Belediyesi

February 3

Aliağa Petkim	77–78	Galatasaray MP

February 17

Galatasaray MP	78–77	Anadolu Efes S.K.

February 23

Olin Edirne Basket	59–69	Galatasaray MP

March 2

Galatasaray MP	84–61	Erdemirspor

March 9

TED Ankara Kolejliler	86–94	Galatasaray MP

March 16

Mersin Büyükşehir Belediyesi S.K.	68–95	Galatasaray MP

March 25

Beşiktaş men's basketball team	72–76	Galatasaray MP

March 30

Galatasaray MP	94–73	Pınar Karşıyaka

April 6

Tofaş S.K.	52–66	Galatasaray MP

April 14

Galatasaray MP	66–53	Fenerbahçe Men's Basketball

April 21

Royal Halı Gaziantep	67–92	Galatasaray MP

April 25

Galatasaray MP	83–75	Banvit B.K.

April 28

Hacettepe Üniversitesi B.K.	69–104	Galatasaray MP

May 5

Galatasaray MP	89–73	Türk Telekom B.K.

== Eurocup ==
=== Regular season ===
Key to colors
Top two teams advance to Last 16

	Team	Pld	W	L	PF	PA	Diff	Tie-break
1.	(Russia) PBC Lokomotiv-Kuban	6	4	2	471	437	+34	1–1 (+1)
2.	(Turkey) Galatasaray Medical Park	6	4	2	492	446	+46	1–1 (–1)
3.	(Ukraine) BC Donetsk	6	3	3	461	459	+2	
4.	(Poland) Trefl Sopot	6	1	5	460	542	–82	

==== Game 1 ====
7 November 2012
20:00

Trefl Sopot (Poland)	65–94	(Turkey) Galatasaray Medical Park
Scoring by quarter: 8–23, 28–24, 15–21, 14–26
Pts: Dylewicz 14; Rebs: Waczyński 11; Asts: Waczyński 5		Pts: N'Dong 14; Rebs: Aldemir 8 Asts: Gordon, Mačvan, Arslan 2

Ergo Arena, Gdańsk/Sopot
Attendance: 4,200
Referees: Tomas Jasevicius (LTU), Sergiy Chebyshev (UKR), Aleksandar Milojevic (MKD)

==== Game 2 ====
14 November 2012
19:15

Report

Galatasaray Medical Park (Turkey)	72–68	(Ukraine) BC Donetsk
Scoring by quarter: 14–18, 25–15, 17–14, 16–21
Pts: Hawkins 22; Rebs: Gordon 8 Asts: Arslan 4		Pts: Curry 17; Rebs: Ivanov 9 Asts: Stojanovski 3

Abdi İpekçi Arena, Istanbul
Attendance: 4,940
Referees: Matej Boltauzer (SLO), Zdravko Rutesic (MNE), Saso Petek (SLO)

==== Game 3 ====
21 November 2012
16:30

Report

PBC Lokomotiv-Kuban (Russia)	91–66	(Turkey) Galatasaray Medical Park
Scoring by quarter: 21–17, 25–19, 26–12, 19–18
Pts: Baron 23; Rebs: Marić, Calathes 6 Asts: Calathes 10		Pts: Gordon 12; Rebs: N'Dong 5 Asts: Hawkins 5

Basket Hall, Krasnodar
Attendance: 6,000
Referees: Milija Vojinovic (SRB), Panagiotis Anastopoulos (GRE), Arnis Ozols (LAT)

==== Game 4 ====
28 November 2012
19:15

Report

Galatasaray Medical Park (Turkey)	76–52	(Russia) PBC Lokomotiv-Kuban
Scoring by quarter: 21–12, 21–13, 20–15, 14–12
Pts: Hawkins 14; Rebs: N'Dong 12; Asts: Gordon, Hawkins 4		Pts: Calathes 19; Rebs: Marić 7 Asts: Calathes 6

Abdi İpekçi Arena, Istanbul
Attendance: 6,249
Referees: Paolo Taurino (ITA), Joseph Bissang (FRA), Jasmina Juras (SRB)

==== Game 5 ====
4 December 2012
19:30

Report

Galatasaray Medical Park (Turkey)	103–82	(Poland) Trefl Sopot
Scoring by quarter: 25–21, 31–15, 20–26, 27–20
Pts: N'Dong 14; Rebs: N'Dong, Aldemir 5 Asts: Atsür 8		Pts: Waczyński 17; Rebs: Looby 7 Asts: Turner 10

Abdi İpekçi Arena, Istanbul
Attendance: 1,880
Referees: Radomir Vojinovic (MNE), Carmelo Paternico (ITA), Regis Bardera (FRA)

==== Game 6 ====
12 December 2012
20:00

Report

BC Donetsk (Ukraine)	88–81 (OT)	(Turkey) Galatasaray Medical Park
Scoring by quarter: 16–11, 9–22, 18–18, 27–19, Overtime: 18–11
Pts: Fischer 19; Rebs: Fischer 9 Asts: Perkins 8		Pts: Dudley 23; Rebs: N'Dong 6 Asts: Gordon, Arslan, Hawkins 3

Druzhba Palace of Sports, Donetsk
Attendance: 350
Referees: Dubravko Muhvic (CRO), Ioannis Foufis (GRE), Alexey Davydov (RUS)

=== Last 16 ===
Key to colors
Top two places in each group advance to the Quarterfinals

	Team	Pld	W	L	PF	PA	Diff	Tie-break
1.	(Russia) BC UNICS Kazan	6	4	2	461	443	+18	
2.	(Germany) Ratiopharm Ulm	6	3	3	516	496	+20	1–1 (+5)
3.	(Turkey) Galatasaray Medical Park	6	3	3	459	459	0	1–1 (–5)
4.	(Serbia) Crvena Zvezda Telekom	6	2	4	476	514	–38	

==== Game 1 ====
9 January 2013
19:15

Report

Galatasaray Medical Park (Turkey)	74–80	(Russia) BC UNICS Kazan
Scoring by quarter: 20–16, 16–19, 19–19, 19–26
Pts: Hawkins 25; Rebs: Hawkins 10; Asts: Hawkins 12		Pts: Eidson 23; Rebs: Vougioukas, Chatman 7 Asts: Chatman 6

Abdi İpekçi Arena, Istanbul
Attendance: 7,480
Referees: Milivoje Jovcic (SRB), Haris Bijedic (BIH), Carlos Cortes (ESP)

==== Game 2 ====
16 January 2013
19:30

Report

Crvena zvezda (Serbia)	74–91	(Turkey) Galatasaray Medical Park
Scoring by quarter: 18–22, 24–27, 18–22, 14–20
Pts: Rakočević 16; Rebs: Savović 9 Asts: Radivojević, Rakočević 3		Pts: Gordon 56; Rebs: N'Dong 15; Asts: Hawkins 10

Pionir Hall, Belgrade
Attendance: 8,000
Referees: Jose Martin (ESP), Gianluca Mattioli (ITA), Marius Ciulin (ROM)

==== Game 3 ====
22 January 2013
19:15

Report

Galatasaray Medical Park (Turkey)	82–66	(Germany) Ratiopharm Ulm
Scoring by quarter: 22–17, 22–20, 22–16, 16–13
Pts: Gordon 27; Rebs: Gordon, Aldemir 8 Asts: Arroyo 13		Pts: Bryant 25; Rebs: Bryant 10; Asts: Jeter 11

Abdi İpekçi Arena, Istanbul
Attendance: 5,540
Referees: Fernando Rocha (POR), Elias Koromilas (GRE), Omer Esteron (ISR)

==== Game 4 ====
30 January 2013
19:30

Report

Ratiopharm Ulm (Germany)	91–70	(Turkey) Galatasaray Medical Park
Scoring by quarter: 25–17, 14–16, 17–20, 35–17
Pts: Bryant 29; Rebs: Bryant 19; Asts: Jeter 16		Pts: Arroyo 25; Rebs: Dudley 16; Asts: Arroyo 10

Arena Ulm/Neu-Ulm, Neu-Ulm
Attendance: 6,000
Referees: Marek Cmikiewicz (POL), Petar Obradović (BIH), Anastasios Piloidis (GRE)

==== Game 5 ====
13 February 2013
16:00

Report

BC UNICS Kazan (Russia)	64–57	(Turkey) Galatasaray Medical Park
Scoring by quarter: 21–14, 11–14, 15–14, 17–15
Pts: Veremeenko 15; Rebs: Veremeenko 9 Asts: Chatman 8		Pts: Atsür 12; Rebs: N'Dong 14; Asts: Arroyo 5

Basket-Hall Arena, Kazan
Attendance: 4,000
Referees: Sinisa Herceg (CRO), Radomir Vojinovic (MNE), Carmelo Paternico (ITA)

==== Game 6 ====
19 February 2013
20:00

Report

Galatasaray Medical Park (Turkey)	85–84	(Serbia) Crvena zvezda
Scoring by quarter: 27–20, 22–22, 16–25, 20–17
Pts: Markoishvili, Arslan 17; Rebs: Aldemir 11; Asts: Korkmaz 4		Pts: Savović 20; Rebs: Savović 13; Asts: Radivojević 8

Abdi İpekçi Arena, Istanbul
Attendance: 1,100
Referees: Christos Christodoulou (GRE), Marcin Kowalski (POL), Ioannis Foufis (GRE)
