= Lydy =

Lydy is a surname. Notable people with the surname include:

- Beth Lydy (1896–1979), American actress, operetta singer, writer, educator, and theatrical producer
- Scott Lydy (born 1968), American baseball player

== See also ==
- Lidy
- Lyday
