= Lyday =

Lyday is a surname. Notable people with the surname include:

- Allen Lyday (born 1960), American football player
- June Lyday Orton (1897–1977), American educational researcher
- Terrell Lyday (born 1979), American basketball player

== See also ==
- Lydy
