= Liddie =

Liddie is a surname. Notable people with the surname include:

- Edward Liddie (born 1959), American judoka
- Ricardo Liddie (born 1966), retired sprinter from Saint Kitts and Nevis

== See also ==
- Liddy, a list of people with the surname, given name or nickname
- Lidy, a list of people with the given name or nickname
