= Liddy =

Liddy may refer to:

== Surname ==
- Brian Liddy (fl. 1990–2006), former Los Angeles Police Department officer charged, but not convicted in the Rampart scandal
- Ed Liddy (born 1946), American businessperson, former chairman and CEO of American International Group (2008–2009)
- G. Gordon Liddy (1930–2021), American lawyer and Watergate conspirator
- James Liddy (1934–2008), Irish poet
- Liz Liddy (1944–2025), American information scientist
- Pat Liddy (born 1944), Irish writer
- Seán Liddy (1890–1965), Irish politician, founding member of the Garda Síochána (the police force of the Republic of Ireland)
- Tom Liddy (born 1962), American attorney, politician and radio talk show host, son of G. Gordon Liddy
- Francesca Liddy, a fictional character from television series Breaking Bad and Better Call Saul

== Given name or nickname ==
- Liddy Clark (born 1953), Australian former politician and actress
- Liddy Hegewald (1884–1950), German film producer
- Liddy Holloway (1947–2004), New Zealand actress
- Liddy Nevile (born 1947), Australian academic

== See also ==
- Liddie, a list of people with the surname
- Lidy, a list of people with the given name or nickname
