= Lidy =

Lidy is the given name or nickname of:

- Lidy Prati (1921–2008), Argentine painter
- Lidy Stoppelman (born 1933), Dutch former figure skater
- Lidy Venneboer (born 1946), Dutch former tennis player

== See also ==
- Liddy
- Liddie
