= Alper Saruhan =

Turkish basketball player (born 1982)

Alper Saruhan (born 4 September 1982) is a Turkish former professional basketball player. Born in Istanbul, he primarily played as a small forward. Standing 2.00 m (6 ft 7 in) tall and weighing 91 kg (201 lb), Saruhan was known for his versatility, defensive skills, and leadership on the court.

Saruhan had a professional career spanning several years, during which he played for multiple Turkish basketball clubs, including Pınar Karşıyaka, Trabzonspor Basketball, Oyak Renault, Manisa BB, Sakarya BŞB Basketball, Muratbey Uşak, and Türk Telekom. Throughout his career, he contributed to his teams in both domestic leagues and international competitions, earning recognition for his consistency and experience.
