= Adam Hrycaniuk =

Polish basketball player (born 1984)

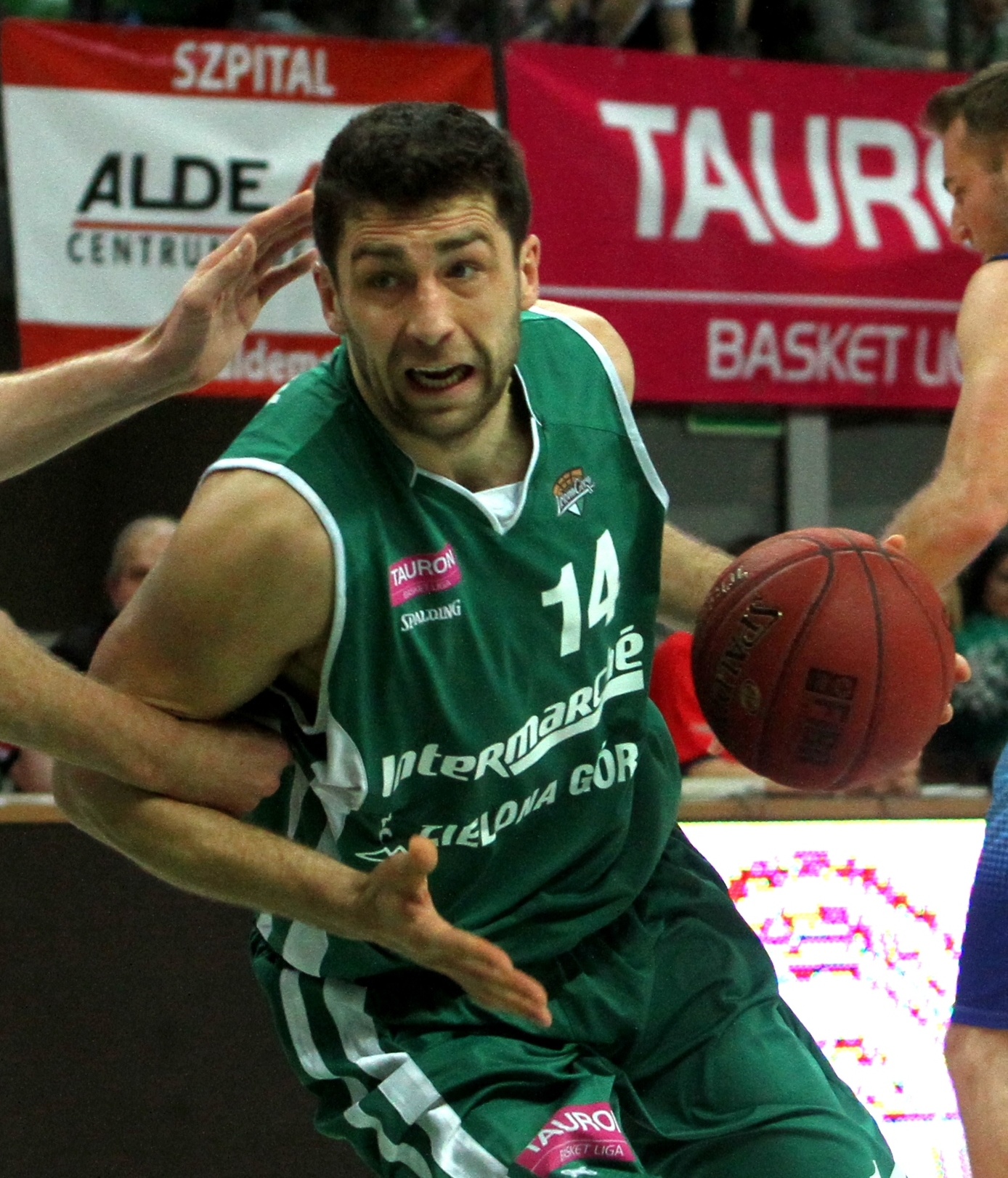
- Hrycaniuk with Zielona Góra in 2013

Personal information
- Born: 15 March 1984 (age 42) Barlinek, Poland
- Listed height: 6 ft 9 in (2.06 m)
- Listed weight: 228 lb (103 kg)

Career information
- College: Barton County CC (2004–2005); Trinity Valley CC (2005–2006); Cincinnati (2007–2008)
- NBA draft: 2008: undrafted
- Playing career: 2002–2026
- Position: Center
- Number: 34

Career history
- 2002–2004: Spójnia Stargard Szczeciński
- 2008–2013: Asseco Prokom Gdynia
- 2013: Valencia Basket
- 2013–2019: Zielona Góra
- 2019–2026: Arka Gdynia

Career highlights
- 7× PLK champion (2009–2012, 2015–2017); 2× Polish Cup winner (2015, 2017)

Adam Hrycaniuk (born 15 March 1984) is a Polish former professional basketball player.

== College career ==
After spending two years in community college, Hrycaniuk spent the 2007–08 season with the Cincinnati Bearcats.

== Professional career ==
From 2008 to 2013 he played with Asseco Prokom Gdynia of the Polish Basketball League.

In March 2013, he signed with Valencia Basket of the Spanish ACB League for the rest of the 2012–13 season.

In September 2013, he returned to Poland and signed with Stelmet Zielona Góra.

On 26 June 2019 he signed a contract with Arka Gdynia of the Polish Basketball League.

On 13 June 2026, he announced his retirement from professional basketball.

== Polish national team ==
Hrycaniuk played for Poland national basketball team at the EuroBasket 2011 and EuroBasket 2013.
