= Robert Rothbart =

Bosnian-Serbian-Israeli basketball player

Robert Rothbart רוברט רות'בארט
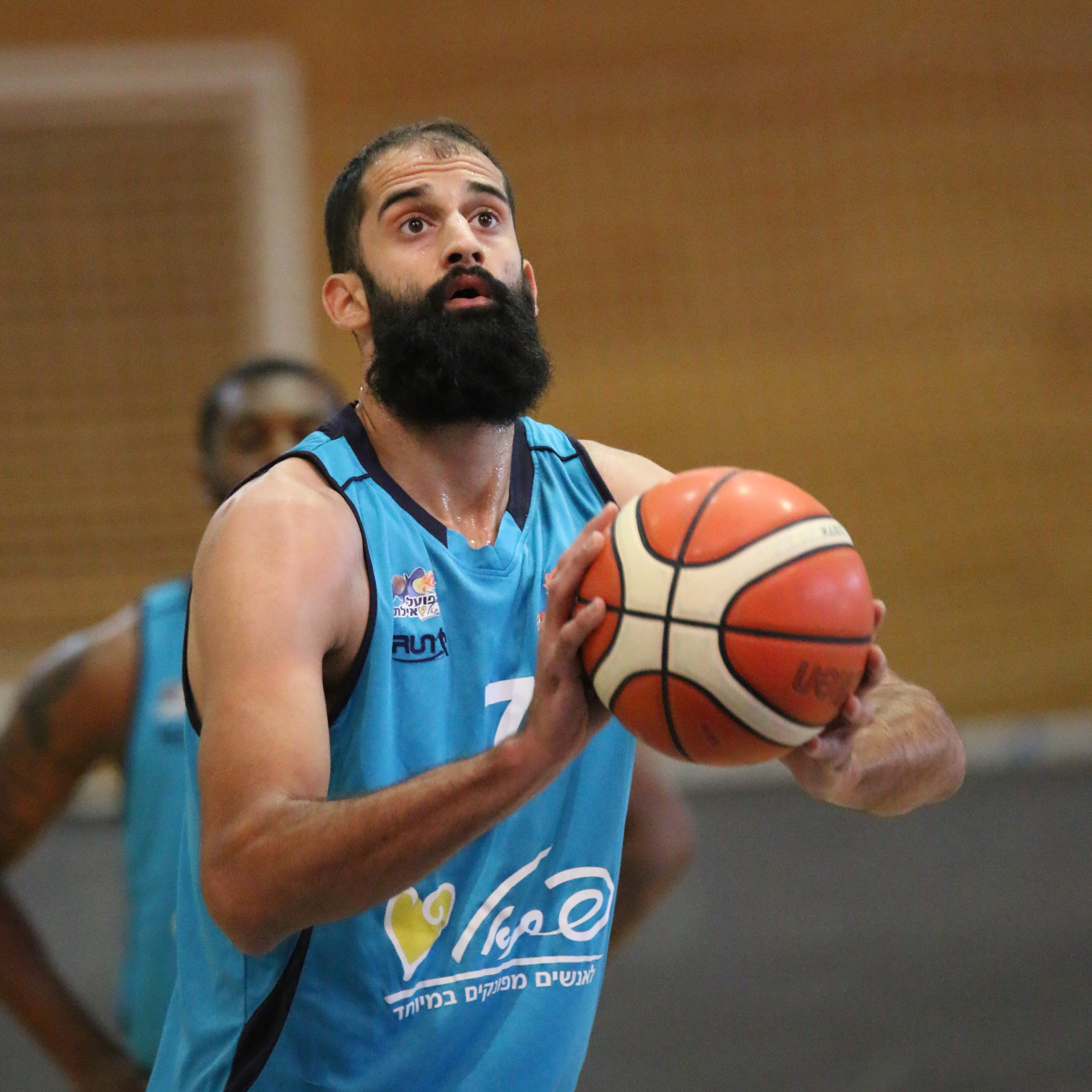
- Rothbart with Hapoel Eilat, 2017

Elitzur Ashkelon
- Position: Center
- League: Israeli National League

Personal information
- Born: June 16, 1986 (age 40) Sarajevo, SR Bosnia and Herzegovina; SFR Yugoslavia
- Listed height: 7 ft 1.5 in (2.17 m)
- Listed weight: 230 lb (104 kg)

Career information
- NBA draft: 2005: undrafted
- Playing career: 2004–2022

Career history
- 2004–2006: Paris Racing
- 2006–2007: Hapoel Galil Elyon
- 2007–2008: Borac Nektar
- 2008–2009: Ironi Nahariya
- 2009–2010: Elitzur Maccabi Netanya
- 2010–2011: Maccabi Haifa
- 2011–2012: Union Olimpija
- 2012–2013: Start Gdynia
- 2013: Gamateks Pamukkale Üniversitesi
- 2014: Leotar
- 2014: Igokea
- 2014–2015: Ironi Nahariya
- 2015–2016: Hapoel Tel Aviv
- 2016–2017: Hapoel Eilat
- 2017–2018: Maccabi Kiryat Gat
- 2018: ESSM Le Portel
- 2018–2019: Hapoel Be'er Sheva
- 2019–2022: Elitzur Eito Ashkelon

Career highlights
- Israeli League Most Improved Player (2015)

Robert Rothbart (Hebrew: רוברט רות'בארט; born Boris Kajmaković on June 16, 1986) is a Bosnian-born Serbian-Israeli professional basketball player playing the position of center for Elitzur Eito Ashkelon of the Israeli National League. He was named the Israeli Basketball Super League Most Improved Player in 2015.

== Early life ==
Rothbart was born in Sarajevo, the capital of Bosnia and Herzegovina, which was at the time part of the former Yugoslavia. Due to the war, Robert and his family moved to Israel, where they stayed for two years before moving to the United States when he was eight years old.

After graduating from The Harker School, a private elementary school in San Jose, California, Rothbart played high school basketball for Saint Francis High School (Mountain View, California), Monta Vista High School (Cupertino, California), and Natomas High School (Sacramento, California). During his stay in Sacramento, he was involved in the Serbian community and was mentored by Serbian-born NBA star Vlade Divac. Rothbart pulled out of the 2004 NBA draft before trying his luck a year later in the 2005 NBA draft, but he went undrafted.

== Professional career ==
Although he initially committed to Indiana University, Rothbart decided in the summer of 2004 to skip college and play in Europe.

After two seasons with Paris Basket Racing in the French Pro A league and one season with Israeli club Hapoel Galil Elyon, Rothbart moved back to play in his birth country of Bosnia and Herzegovina to play for Borac Banja Luka in the local First League of Republika Srpska.

Prior to the 2008–09 season, he returned to the Israeli League, this time signing with Ironi Nahariya.

Prior to the 2009–10 season, Rothbart signed with Elitzur Maccabi Netanya B.C., with whom he reached the Israeli Basketball State Cup semi-finals.

In the summer of 2010, Rothbart signed to play for Maccabi Haifa.

In August 2011, Rothbart signed with Union Olimpija.

Rothbart signed with Polish team Start Gdynia in 2012, Turkish team Gamateks Pamukkale Üniversitesi in 2013, and 2 Bosnian teams, Leotar and KK Igokea, in 2014.

In July 2015, Rothbart signed a 2-year deal with Hapoel Tel Aviv after being named the Israeli League's Most Improved Player and MVP of the league's all-star game in the previous season. He was named the Israeli Basketball Super League Most Improved Player in 2015.

In July 2016, Rothbart signed with Hapoel Eilat.

On August 17, 2017, Rothbart signed with Maccabi Kiryat Gat, joining his former head coach Roi Hagai. In 35 games played for Kiryat Gat, he averaged 18.9 points, 12.3 rebounds, 2.3 assists and 2.1 blocks per game. Rothbart helped Kiryat Gat reach the Liga Leumit Finals, where they eventually lost to Hapoel Be'er Sheva.

On June 4, 2018, Rothbart returned to France for a second stint, signing a one-year deal with a second year option with ESSM Le Portel of the LNB Pro A league. However, on November 11, Rothbart parted ways with Le Portel to join Hapoel Be'er Sheva for the rest of the season.

On July 14, 2019, Rothbart signed a one-year deal with Elitzur Eito Ashkelon of the Israeli National League.

== Personal ==
Robert holds citizenship for a few countries including Bosnia and Herzegovina, Serbia, the United States of America, and Israel.
