= Furkan Aldemir =

Turkish basketball player (born 1991)

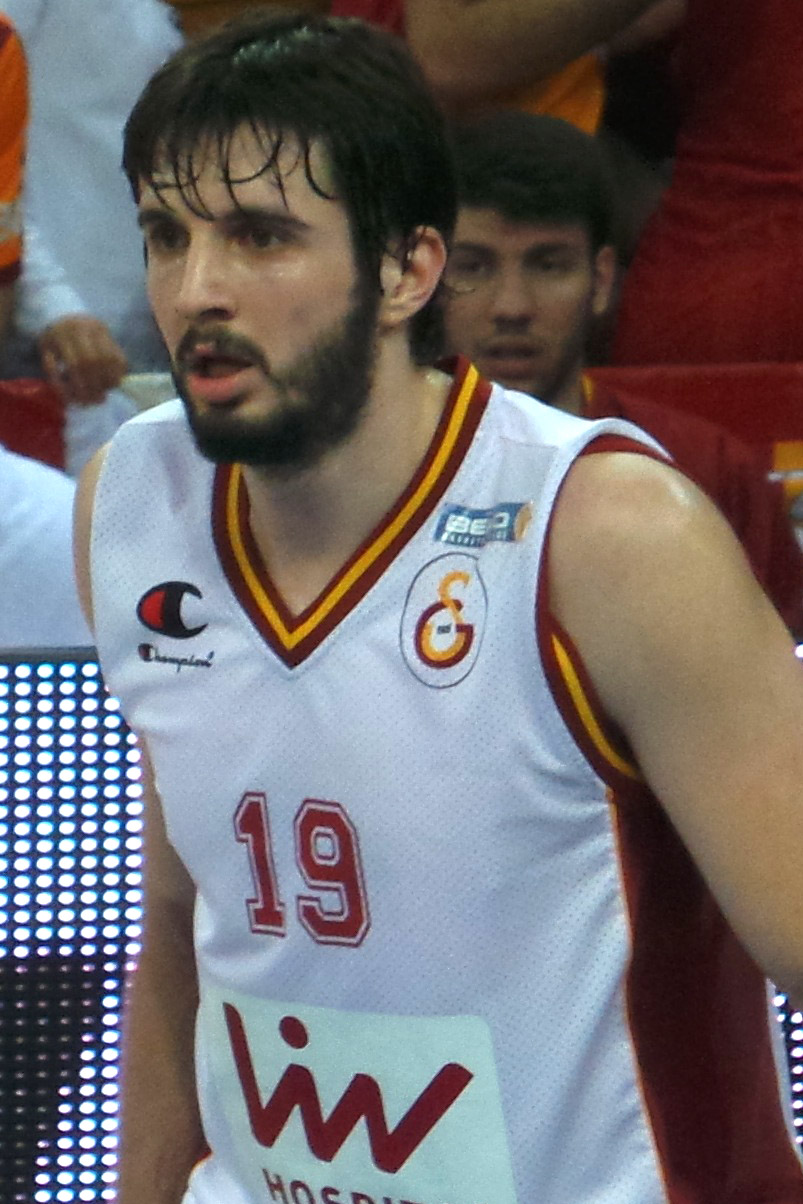
- Aldemir with Galatasaray in 2013

Personal information
- Born: August 9, 1991 (age 35) Konak, Izmir, Turkey
- Listed height: 6 ft 10 in (2.08 m)
- Listed weight: 240 lb (109 kg)

Career information
- NBA draft: 2012: 2nd round, 53rd overall pick
- Drafted by: Los Angeles Clippers
- Playing career: 2007–2018
- Position: Power forward / center
- Number: 19

Career history
- 2007–2011: Karşıyaka
- 2011–2014: Galatasaray Liv Hospital
- 2014–2015: Philadelphia 76ers
- 2015–2018: Darüşşafaka

Career highlights
- EuroCup champion (2018); Turkish League champion (2013); 3× BSL All-Star (2010, 2012, 2016)
- Stats at NBA.com
- Stats at Basketball Reference
Medals
Men's basketball
Representing Turkey
European U-18 Championship
Bronze medal – third place	2009 France	Team

Furkan Aldemir (born August 9, 1991) is a Turkish professional basketball player who last played for Darüşşafaka of the Turkish Basketbol Süper Ligi (BSL) and the EuroLeague. Standing at 6 ft 10 in (2.08 m), he mainly plays the power forward position, but he can also play as a center if needed.

== Professional career ==
=== Turkey ===
Aldemir made his professional debut in the Turkish Basketball Super League with Karşıyaka during the 2007–08 season. In June 2011, he signed a four-year deal with Galatasaray. In May 2014, he signed a new three-year, €3.9 million net income contract with Galatasaray. On November 24, 2014, he announced via Facebook, of his decision to leave Galatasaray, in pursuit of an NBA contract. On December 1, 2014, he officially parted ways with Galatasaray.

=== NBA ===
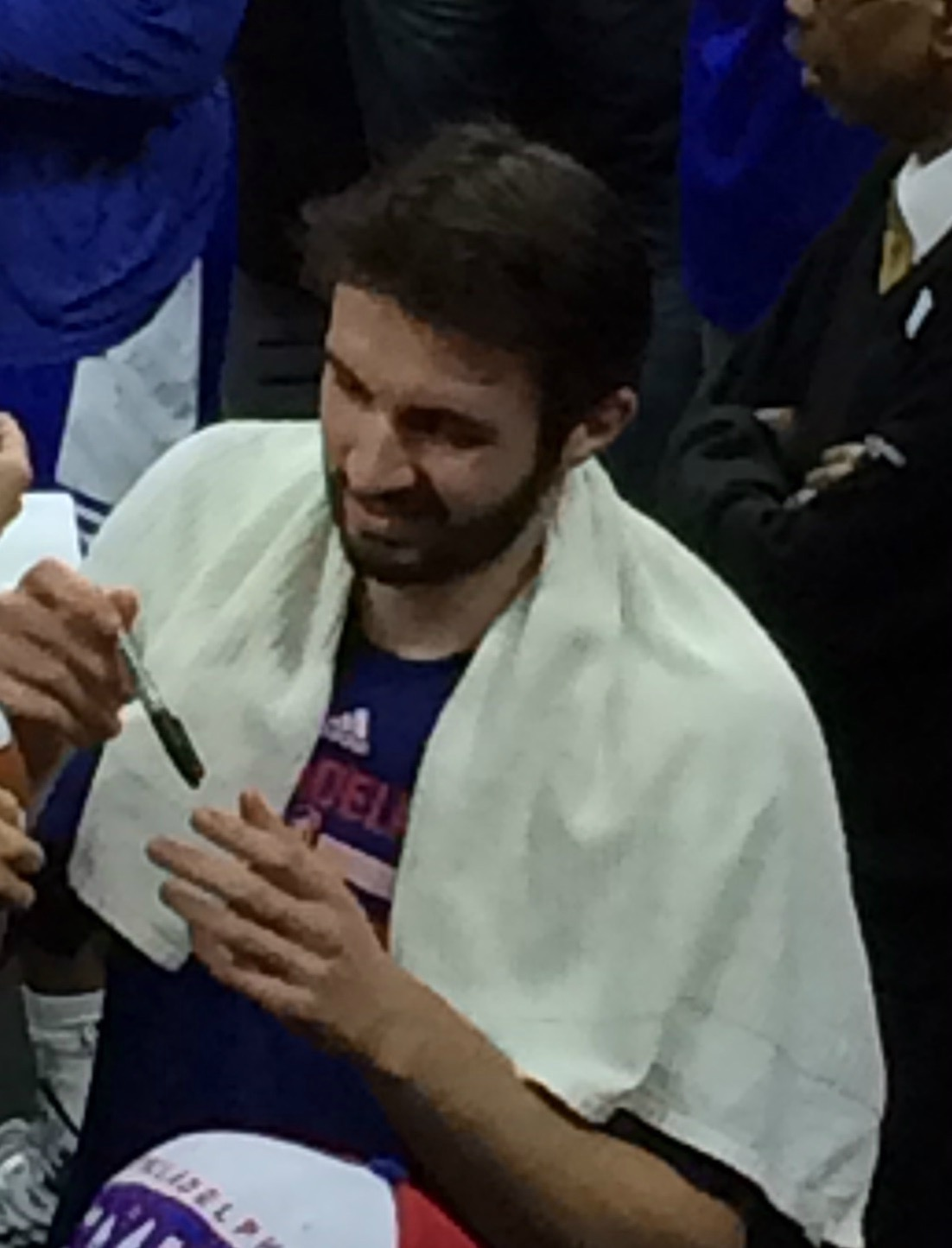
Aldemir with the 76ers

Aldemir was an early entrant in the 2012 NBA draft, and was selected by the Los Angeles Clippers with the 53rd overall pick. His rights were subsequently traded to the Houston Rockets in a four-team trade. On July 13, 2013, his rights were traded, along with Royce White, to the Philadelphia 76ers.

On December 15, 2014, Aldemir signed with the Philadelphia 76ers. He made his NBA debut the same day, against the Boston Celtics, recording 2 points, 2 rebounds, and 1 assist, in a 105–87 loss. On October 26, 2015, he was waived by the 76ers.

=== Return to Europe ===
On November 7, 2015, Aldemir signed a four-year contract with Darüşşafaka.

== International career ==
Aldemir was a regular Turkish youth national team player, as he won a bronze medal at the 2009 FIBA Europe Under-18 Championship. He also played at the 2010 FIBA Europe Under-20 Championship, where he averaged 11.6 rebounds per game. A year later, he played at the 2011 FIBA Europe Under-20 Championship, where he averaged 14.8 points, 15.9 rebounds, 1.3 assists, and 1.7 blocks per game. He was named to the All-Tournament team for his performance. He went on to play for the senior men's Turkish national basketball team at the FIBA EuroBasket 2013 qualification, and the 2014 FIBA Basketball World Cup.

== Career statistics ==
Legend
GP	Games played	GS	Games started	MPG	Minutes per game
FG%	Field-goal percentage	3P%	3-point field-goal percentage	FT%	Free-throw percentage
RPG	Rebounds per game	APG	Assists per game	SPG	Steals per game
BPG	Blocks per game	PPG	Points per game	PIR	Performance index rating
**Bold**	Career high

=== NBA ===
==== Regular season ====
Year	Team	GP	GS	MPG	FG%	3P%	FT%	RPG	APG	SPG	BPG	PPG
2014–15	Philadelphia	41	9	13.2	.513	.000	.481	4.3	.7	.4	.4	2.3
Career		41	9	13.2	.513	.000	.481	4.3	.7	.4	.4	2.3

=== EuroLeague ===
Year	Team	GP	GS	MPG	FG%	3P%	FT%	RPG	APG	SPG	BPG	PPG	PIR
2011–12	Galatasaray	15	7	16.8	.557	.000	**.795**	4.8	.5	**.7**	.4	6.6	92
2013–14	Galatasaray	22	**13**	17.4	.654	.000	.515	**6.3**	**.7**	.5	1.0	5.4	10.0
2014–15	Galatasaray	6	6	**20.7**	**.750**	.000	.733	6.2	.3	**.7**	**1.3**	**7.8**	**12.7**
2015–16	Darüşşafaka	13	0	9.2	.704	.000	.400	2.8	.3	.2	.5	3.2	4.8
2016–17	Darüşşafaka	**30**	6	9.4	.375	.000	.481	2.5	.2	.1	.4	1.6	2.5
Career		86	32	13.6	.588	.000	.613	4.2	.4	.3	.6	4.1	6.7
