= Jaka Lakovič =

Slovenian basketball player (born 1978)

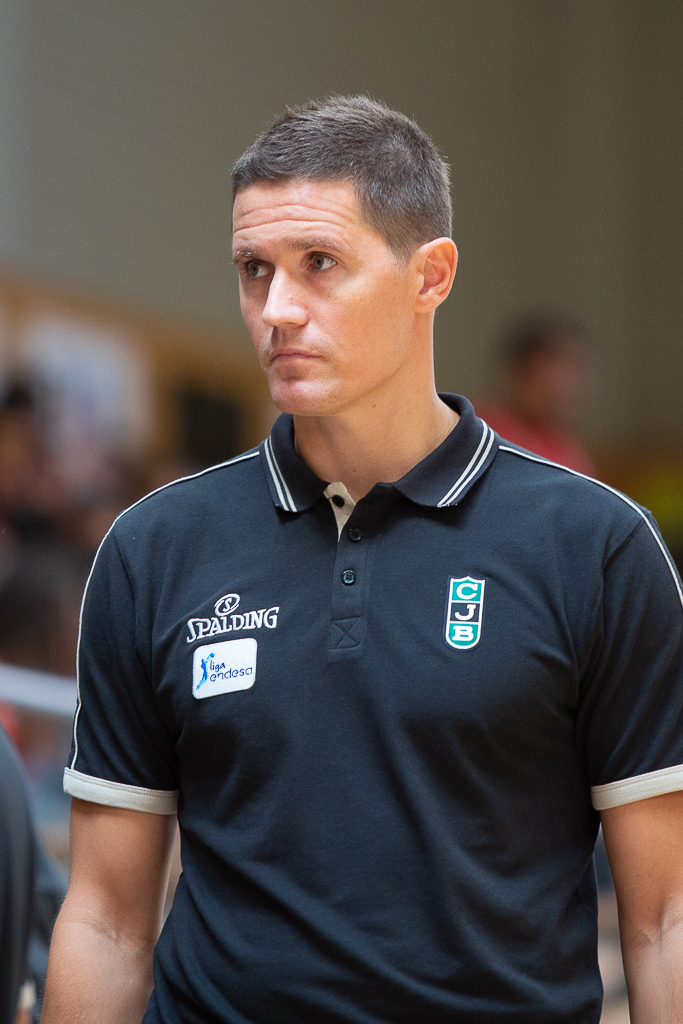
- Lakovič as an assistant coach of Joventut, in 2018.

La Laguna Tenerife
- Title: Head coach
- League: Liga ACB; EuroCup

Personal information
- Born: 9 July 1978 (age 48) Ljubljana, SR Slovenia, Yugoslavia
- Listed height: 1.86 m (6 ft 1 in)
- Listed weight: 95 kg (209 lb)

Career information
- NBA draft: 2000: undrafted
- Playing career: 1996–2016
- Position: Point guard
- Number: 10, 7, 5
- Coaching career: 2016–present

Career history

Playing
- 1996–2001: Geoplin Slovan
- 2001–2002: Krka
- 2002–2006: Panathinaikos
- 2006–2011: Barcelona
- 2011–2013: Galatasaray
- 2013–2014: Sidigas Avellino
- 2014–2015: Royal Halı Gaziantep
- 2015–2016: Barcelona B

Coaching
- 2016–2017: Barcelona B (assistant)
- 2016–2020: Slovenia (assistant)
- 2017–2018: Bilbao (assistant)
- 2018: Bilbao
- 2018–2019: Joventut (assistant)
- 2019–2022: ratiopharm Ulm
- 2022–2026: Gran Canaria
- 2026–present: La Laguna Tenerife

Career highlights
- As a player: EuroLeague champion (2010); All-EuroLeague Second Team (2005); 2× Liga ACB champion (2009, 2011); 3× Spanish Cup winner (2007, 2010, 2011); 2× Spanish Super Cup winner (2009, 2010); 4× Greek League champion (2003–2006); 3× Greek Cup winner (2003, 2005, 2006); 2× Greek League Finals MVP (2003, 2005); 2× All-Greek League Second Team (2004, 2005); 3× Greek League All-Star (2003, 2005, 2006); Greek Cup Finals MVP (2005); Turkish Super Cup winner (2011); Slovenian League All-Star (2001); As a head coach: EuroCup champion (2023)
Medals
Men's basketball
Representing Slovenia
FIBA Europe Under-20 Championship
Silver medal – second place	1998 Italy	Under-20 Team
Assistant coach for Slovenia
EuroBasket
Gold medal – first place	2017 Turkey	Team

Jaka Lakovič (born 9 July 1978) is a Slovenian professional basketball coach and former player. He currently serves as the head coach for La Laguna Tenerife of the Spanish Liga ACB and the EuroCup.

Standing at 1.86 m (6 ft 1 in), and weighing 95 kg (210 lbs.), he played at the point guard position. He was an All-EuroLeague Second Team selection in 2005, and he helped lead the senior Slovenia national team to the fourth place finish at 2009 EuroBasket.

== Professional career ==
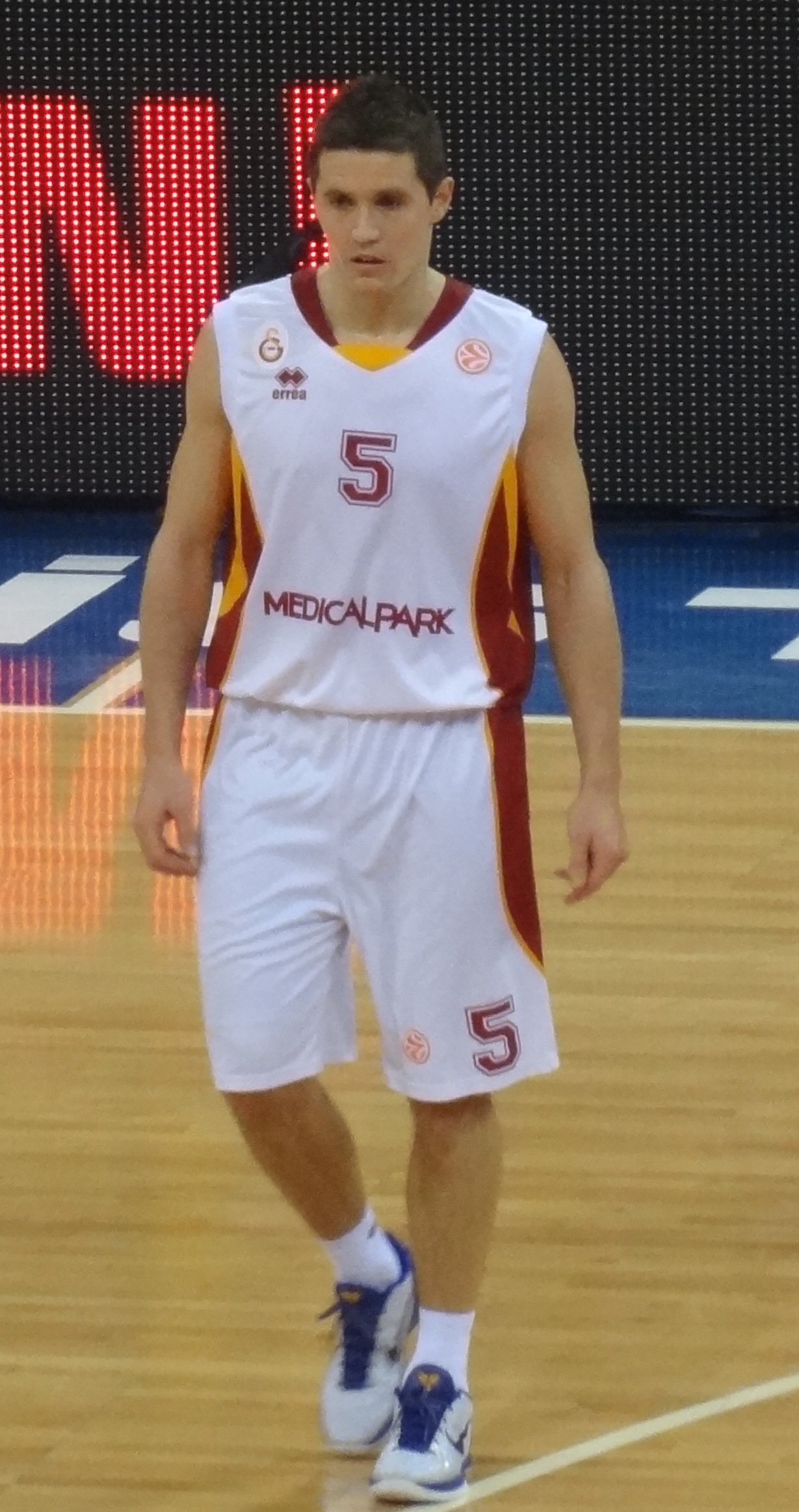
Lakovič, as a Galatasaray player, in 2012.

In his pro club career, Lakovič played with the following clubs: Geoplin Slovan and Krka of the Slovenian Premier A League, Panathinaikos Athens of the Greek Basket League, Barcelona of the Spanish ACB League, Galatasaray Istanbul of the Turkish Super League, and Avellino of the Italian A League.

His brilliant performances during the 2004–05 EuroLeague season, while wearing the Panathinaikos Athens jersey, earned him an All-EuroLeague Second Team selection, as he helped his team reach the 2005 EuroLeague Final Four. In 2005, he was also named the MVP of the Greek Cup, and the MVP of the Greek League Finals. He won the EuroLeague championship in 2010, while a member of Barcelona.

In July 2011, he signed a two-year contract with the Turkish Super League club Galatasaray Istanbul. In January 2013, he signed with the Italian A League club Sidigas Avellino, until the end of the season. In September 2013, he extended his contract with Avellino, for one more season.

In December 2014, he signed with the Turkish Super League club Royal Halı Gaziantep, for the 2014–15 season. In September 2015, he signed with Barcelona Lassa's reserve team. At that time, he also announced that would be his last year as a professional basketball player, before he would begin to start coaching in the youth teams of Barcelona. On 27 July 2016, Lakovič announced his retirement from playing professional club basketball.

== National team career ==
Lakovič competed for the senior Slovenian men's national team at the 2006 FIBA World Championship, the 2010 FIBA World Championship, and also at 7 straight FIBA EuroBaskets; 2001, 2003, 2005, 2007, 2009, 2011 and 2013.

== Coaching career ==
Lakovič began his basketball coaching career in 2016, when he became an assistant coach for the senior Slovenian men's national team, working under the team's head coach, at that time, Igor Kokoškov. He started coaching at the EuroBasket 2017 qualification tournament.

On 7 August 2017, Lakovič signed with the Spanish ACB League club Bilbao, as an assistant coach. On 30 April 2018, following the departure of Veljko Mršić, he took over the club's head coach position.

In June 2019, he was announced as the new head coach of the German Bundesliga club ratiopharm Ulm. On 17 June 2022, Lakovič signed to be the head coach of Gran Canaria, of Spain's Liga ACB. With Gran Canaria, he won the European-wide secondary level EuroCup championship, in the 2022–23 season. On April 8, 2026, Gran Canaria announced it was parting ways with Lakovič.

On 22 June 2026, he signed as the new head coach of La Laguna Tenerife of the Liga ACB.

== Career statistics ==
Legend
GP	Games played	GS	Games started	MPG	Minutes per game
FG%	Field-goal percentage	3P%	3-point field-goal percentage	FT%	Free-throw percentage
RPG	Rebounds per game	APG	Assists per game	SPG	Steals per game
BPG	Blocks per game	PPG	Points per game	PIR	Performance index rating
**Bold**	Career high	†	Won a EuroLeague championship

=== EuroLeague ===
Year	Team	GP	GS	MPG	FG%	3P%	FT%	RPG	APG	SPG	BPG	PPG	PIR
2001–02	Krka	14	13	**32.5**	.491	.436	.890	2.1	**3.8**	**2.0**	—	**20.9**	**22.4**
2002–03	Panathinaikos	19	6	23.7	**.504**	**.500**	**.891**	1.8	2.6	.5	—	9.4	9.3
2003–04	Panathinaikos	20	15	29.2	.448	.358	.846	2.1	2.4	1.3	**.1**	13.4	14.3
2004–05	Panathinaikos	**25**	19	31.5	.445	.353	.839	2.1	2.8	1.4	—	15.1	15.7
2005–06	Panathinaikos	22	**21**	31.0	.400	.370	.838	1.4	2.5	1.1	**.1**	14.4	13.7
2006–07	Barcelona	23	19	24.7	.429	.398	.768	1.7	3.5	.9	.0	10.3	11.0
2007–08	Barcelona	23	20	25.4	.388	.358	.807	**2.2**	3.0	1.0	—	12.2	12.5
2008–09	Barcelona	18	11	22.7	.435	.413	.881	1.3	2.9	.8	—	9.9	10.3
2009–10†	Barcelona	19	0	13.6	.416	.439	.879	.8	1.3	.5	—	6.2	5.9
2010–11	Barcelona	19	3	15.5	.426	.365	.643	.5	1.9	.2	**.1**	6.4	5.6
2011–12	Galatasaray	16	8	26.2	.396	.361	.818	1.9	2.7	.3	**.1**	9.7	10.0
Career		218	135	25.2	.433	.386	.836	1.6	2.7	.9	.0	11.6	11.8

== Career awards and achievements ==
=== Panathinaikos Athens ===
- 4× Greek League Champion: 2003, 2004, 2005, 2006
- 3× Greek Cup Winner: 2003, 2005, 2006

=== Barcelona ===
- 2× Spanish League Champion: 2009, 2011
- 3× Spanish Cup Winner: 2007, 2010, 2011
- 2× Spanish Super Cup Winner: 2009, 2010
- EuroLeague Champion: 2010

=== Galatasaray Istanbul ===
- Turkish Super Cup Winner: 2011

=== Slovenia junior national team ===
- 1998 FIBA Europe Under-20 Championship: Silver

=== Individual ===
- Slovenian League All-Star: 2001
- Led the EuroLeague in free throw shooting percentage (89.0%): 2002
- Led the Slovenian League in assists: 2002
- 3× Greek League All-Star: 2003, 2005, 2006
- 2× Greek League Finals MVP: 2003, 2005
- Led the Greek League in free throw shooting percentage (91.0%): 2004
- All-Greek League Second Team: 2004
- All-Greek League Best Five: 2005
- Greek Cup MVP: 2005
- All-EuroLeague 2nd Team: 2005

=== Coaching career ===
- EuroCup Champion: (2023)
