= Tutku Açık =

Turkish basketball player and coach

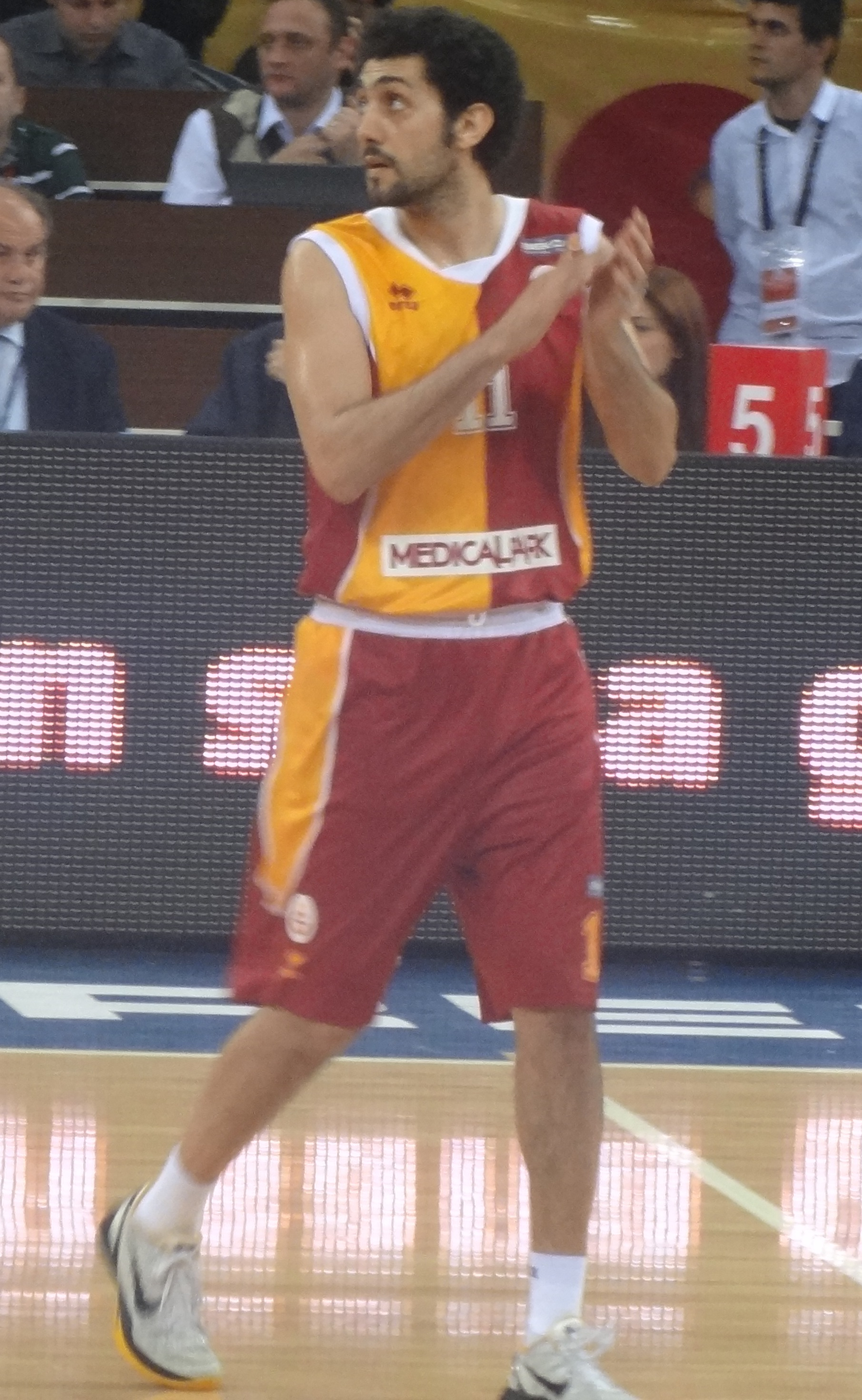
- Açık with Galatasaray Medical Park

Pizza Bulls Bordo Bandırma
- Position: Head coach
- League: BSL

Personal information
- Born: September 1, 1980 (age 46) Diyarbakır, Turkey
- Listed height: 6 ft 4.5 in (1.94 m)
- Listed weight: 176 lb (80 kg)

Career information
- NBA draft: 2002: undrafted
- Playing career: 1997–2018

Career history

Playing
- 1997–1999: Ülkerspor
- 1999–2000: Mydonose Kolejliler
- 2000–2005: Ülkerspor
- 2005–2010: Türk Telekom
- 2010–2012: Galatasaray Medical Park
- 2012–2013: Beşiktaş
- 2013–2014: Trabzonspor
- 2016–2017: Ankara DSİ

Coaching
- 2018–2019: Galatasaray Doğa Sigorta (assistant)
- 2019–2020: Bursaspor (assistant)
- 2020: Bursaspor
- 2021–2023: Gaziantep Basketbol
- 2025–present: Bandırma Bordo Basketbol

Tutku Açık (born September 1, 1980) is a Turkish professional basketball coach and former player. He played the point guard position. He is the current head coach for Bandırma Bordo Basketbol of the Basketbol Süper Ligi (BSL).

== International career ==
Tutku Açık had been called to Turkish national team for several times.
