= Cevher Özer =

Turkish basketball player (born 1983)

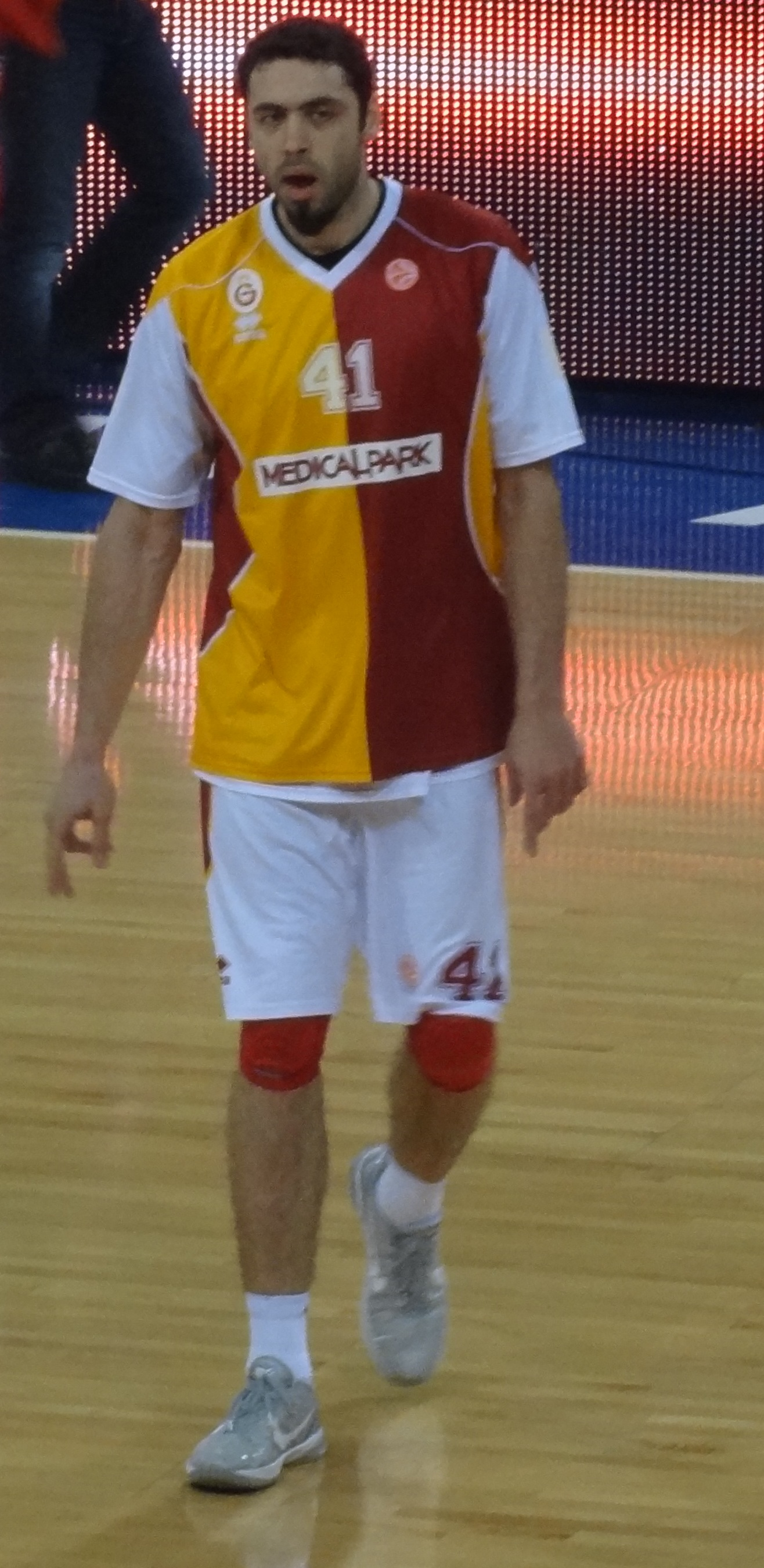
- Özer with Galatasaray Medical Park

Personal information
- Born: January 24, 1983 (age 43) Manisa, Turkey
- Listed height: 6 ft 9 in (2.06 m)
- Listed weight: 238 lb (108 kg)

Career information
- Playing career: 2000–2024
- Position: Power forward

Career history
- 2000–2002: Türk Telekom
- 2002–2006: Darüşşafaka
- 2006–2011: Beşiktaş Cola Turka
- 2011–2012: Galatasaray Medical Park
- 2012–2013: Beşiktaş
- 2013–2015: Banvit
- 2015: TED Ankara Kolejliler
- 2015–2017: Türk Telekom
- 2017–2019: Afyon Belediye
- 2019–2021: Ormanspor
- 2021–2022: Sigortam.net Basketbol
- 2022–2023: Konyaspor
- 2023–2024: TED Ankara Kolejliler

Cevher Özer (born 24 January 1983) is a Turkish former professional basketball player. He played as a power forward.
