= Jamon Gordon =

American basketball player (born 1984)

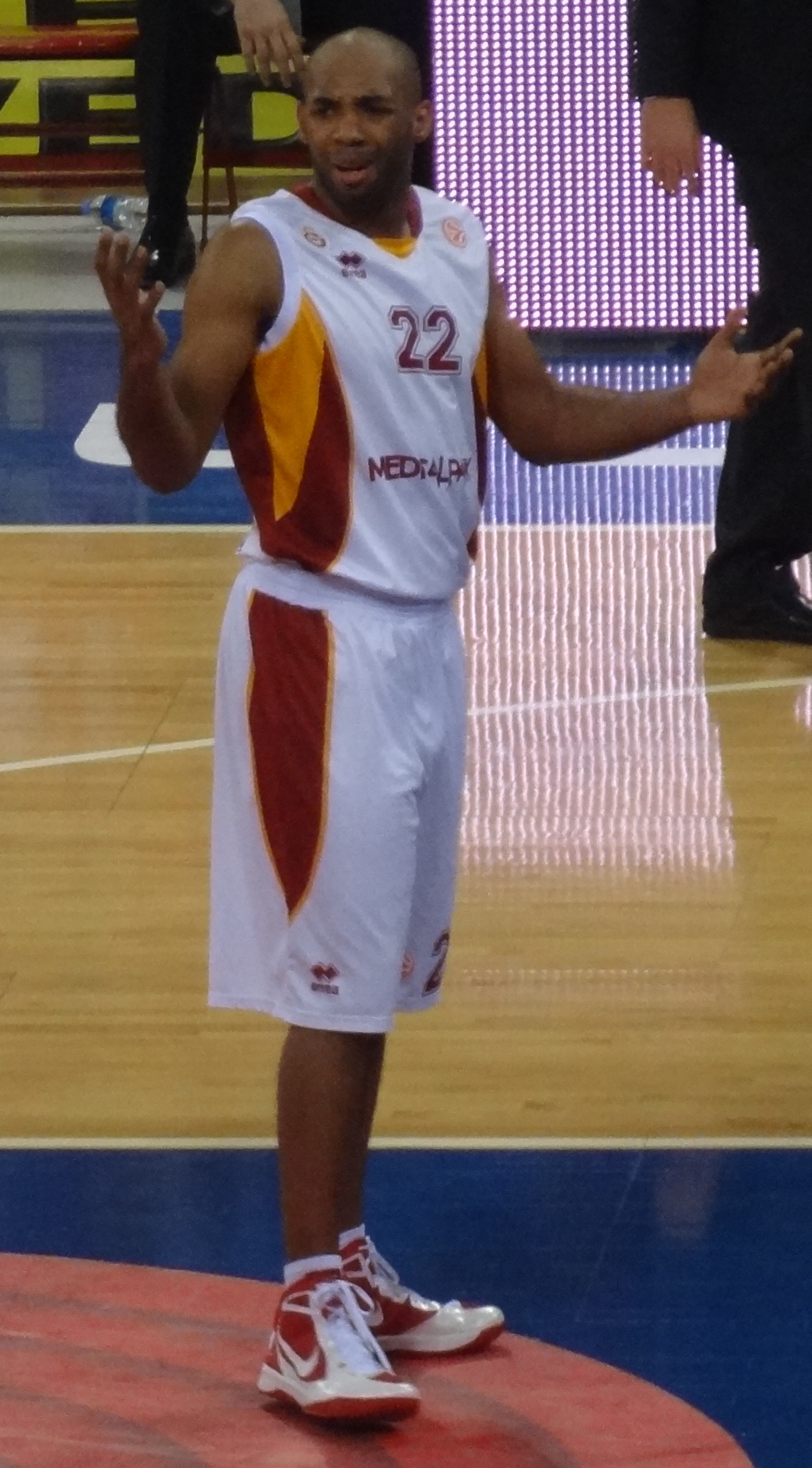
- Gordon with Galatasaray

Personal information
- Born: July 18, 1984 (age 42) Jacksonville, Florida
- Listed height: 6 ft 3 in (1.91 m)

Career information
- High school: Andrew Jackson (Jacksonville, Florida)
- College: Virginia Tech (2003–2007)
- NBA draft: 2007: undrafted
- Playing career: 2007–2017
- Position: Point guard / shooting guard
- Number: 22

Career history
- 2007–2008: Antalya BB
- 2008–2009: Köln 99ers
- 2009: Split
- 2009–2010: Maroussi
- 2010–2011: Olympiacos
- 2011–2012: Galatasaray
- 2012–2014: Anadolu Efes
- 2014–2016: Darüşşafaka
- 2017: Aris Thessaloniki
- 2017: Pistoia Basket 2000

Career highlights
- Greek Cup winner (2011); Turkish President's Cup winner (2011); Greek League assists leader (2010); 2× EuroLeague steals leader (2012, 2014); Third-team All-ACC (2007); ACC Defensive Player of the Year (2007); 2× All-ACC Defensive Team (2005, 2007); All-Greek League Second Team (2010); All-Greek League Defensive Team (2011)

Jamon Alfred Lucas Gordon (born July 18, 1984) is an American former professional basketball player. Standing at 1.91 m (6 ft 3 in) he played the point guard and shooting guard positions. He played college basketball with the Virginia Tech Hokies.

== Early life ==
Jamon Lucas Gordon attended Andrew Jackson High School, where he played high school basketball and was first team all-state as a junior and senior. He led the state of Florida in steals as a junior and senior, and also had the most steals (four) in the state final as a senior. He averaged 19 points per game that year and made the Florida-Georgia All-Star Classic in Orlando, Florida. Scout.com ranked Gordon as the 20th best point guard in the nation.

== College career ==
Gordon attended and played college basketball at Virginia Tech, with the Virginia Tech Hokies, from 2003 to 2007. A four-year starter, Gordon and teammate Zabian Dowdell were considered one of the best backcourt duos in the Atlantic Coast Conference. Gordon has the second most career assists (514) and steals (273) in Virginia Tech history. He was named third-team All-ACC in 2006–07, All-ACC Defensive team twice, and was the 2006–07 ACC Defensive Player of the Year.

=== Freshman season (2003–04) ===
Gordon started the first 11 games for the Hokies as a freshman. He then missed the next five games, which were the first five conference games, to have surgery to repair a torn meniscus in his right knee. His first collegiate start was on November 22, 2003, in a win against the University of New Hampshire, 79–49. In that game, Gordon had 20 points, six rebounds, five assists, and four steals to earn Big East Conference Rookie of the Week. On December 1, 2003, he had 12 points, eight rebounds, seven steals and six assists in a win against Morgan State University, 76–66. Gordon's seven steals were one away from tying the Tech school record of eight steals. Less than a month later, on December 23, 2003, he tied the Tech record with eight steals in a win over the College of William & Mary, and also tied a career-high with nine rebounds.

At the end of the regular season, Gordon played in two games of the 2004 Big East tournament, Virginia Tech's first team to ever make the tournament. In the first round win over Rutgers University, he led the team with five assists and five steals. Virginia Tech then lost in the quarterfinals to the University of Pittsburgh, and Gordon led the Hokies with 14 points and six assists. He played in 24 games, started 23 games during the season, and was third on the team in scoring. In his last 20 games of the season, Gordon had 95 assists.

=== Sophomore season (2004–05) ===
The 2004–05 season was Virginia Tech's first in the Atlantic Coast Conference, and Gordon made an impact early. In their first conference win, he had 14 points and five rebounds against Clemson University. On February 5, 2005, Gordon scored a then career-high 22 points in a loss against Wake Forest University. On February 17, 2005, he scored 17 points and had six rebounds in the win over seventh-ranked Duke University in Cassell Coliseum, one of the most famous victories in Virginia Tech basketball history. In the regular season finale, Gordon scored a then career-best 23 points, including seven points in the final 2½ minutes, to beat the University of Maryland, College Park, 86–76. The win secured a first-round bye in the 2005 ACC men's basketball tournament, who then lost in the first round to Georgia Tech.

After the regular season, Gordon totaled 23 points, 12 rebounds and seven assists in two games of the 2005 National Invitation Tournament, including a team-high 16 points in a second-round loss against the University of Memphis. The tournament was Virginia Tech's first postseason appearance in nine years and their first National Invitation Tournament appearance in a decade. Gordon finished the season with 67 steals and 31 blocks, and was named to the ACC All-Defensive team. He started 29 games and led the team in assists (120) and steals (67). He also was second in rebounds (148) and fourth in scoring (36).

=== Junior season (2005–06) ===
Gordon started off his junior season strong. In the third game, a win against Western Carolina University, he recorded his first career double-double with 11 points and a then career-high ten rebounds. He also had four assists and two steals. On December 7, 2005, Gordon recorded his second double-double of the season, with 11 points and a career-high 11 assists in a win over North Carolina A&T State University. He scored 18 points in a loss to Old Dominion University. Of those 18 points, he scored 12 in the second half, including ten points in the final two minutes. On January 28, 2006, Gordon scored 21 points and a then career-high 14 rebounds for this third double-double in a win against Wake Forest University. He also had three assists and three steals. He then had his fourth double-double of the season with 21 points and a career-high 16 rebounds in a win over Clemson University. The following game, Gordon scored a career-high 24 points in a loss against the University of Virginia. He also had seven rebounds in a career-high 44 minutes.

After the regular season, Gordon scored four points against the University of Virginia in the 2006 ACC tournament. He also had four rebounds and three assists. Gordon played in all thirty games during the season, and started 28 games. He led the team in rebounding and assists, was second in steals, third in scoring (11.4), and third in blocked shots. He had three double-doubles involving points and rebounds, and one double-double of points and assists.

=== Senior season (2006–07) ===
On January 6, 2007, Gordon scored 17 points and had six rebounds in an overtime win against fifth-ranked Duke University in Cameron Indoor Stadium, the Hokies first win at that arena. On January 13, 2007, he scored 17 points and had six rebounds, six assists, and five steals in a win over the first-ranked University of North Carolina in Cassell Coliseum, ending North Carolina's 12-game winning streak. On February 13, 2007, Gordon scored ten points in an overtime win again against fourth-ranked North Carolina in the Dean Smith Center, completing the sweep. After the regular season, he scored 22 points, had nine assists, grabbed 18 rebounds, and had ten steals in two games of the 2007 ACC tournament. Gordon then scored 26 points and had eight assists, eight rebounds, and eight steals in two games of the 2007 NCAA tournament. The first-round game, a win against the University of Illinois, was the Hokies' first NCAA Tournament victory since the 1996 NCAA tournament.

Gordon started in 33 games, and led the Hokies in steals (94) and assists (154). He was first in the ACC in steals per game (2.8) and was named the ACC Player of the Week on December 25, 2006. At the end of the season, he earned All-ACC third team honors and was named to the All-ACC Defensive team. Gordon was then named the ACC Defensive Player of the Year and received 54 of a possible 106 votes by members of the Atlantic Coast Sports Media Association.

=== College statistics ===
Year	Team	GP	GS	MPG	FG%	3P%	FT%	RPG	APG	SPG	BPG	PPG
2003–04	Virginia Tech Hokies	24	23	33.3	.365	.280	.673	4.4	4.5	2.8	0.5	9.8
2004–05	Virginia Tech Hokies	29	29	33.9	.416	.264	.581	5.1	4.1	2.3	1.1	10.9
2005–06	Virginia Tech Hokies	30	28	34.9	.459	.286	.653	6.0	4.4	2.1	0.7	11.4
2006–07	Virginia Tech Hokies	34	33	31.6	.461	.268	.632	4.5	4.5	2.8	0.5	11.4
Career		117	113	33.4	.428	.274	.633	5.0	4.4	2.5	0.7	10.9

== Professional career ==
=== NBA attempts ===
Before the 2007 NBA draft, Gordon played with the Tidewater Sealants in the Portsmouth Invitational Tournament, which is the oldest amateur basketball tournament, and the only postseason camp conducted for the top NCAA seniors only. Gordon and the Sealants lost in the opening round against Holiday Inn Portsmouth, 110–71, and Gordon had six points, four rebounds, three blocks, and two steals.

After going undrafted in the 2007 NBA Draft, Gordon played for the Dallas Mavericks in the 2007 NBA Summer League, at the Thomas & Mack Center and the Cox Pavilion, in Las Vegas, Nevada, from July 6 to the 15. NBA Summer League teams consist of players who have been in the NBA for three years or fewer, as well as newly drafted rookies. In 4 games played in the summer league, he averaged 2.0 points and 1.2 rebounds per game.

Gordon signed with the Washington Wizards before NBA regular season training camp on October 1, 2007. He played in the Wizards' first preseason game on October 9, 2007, against the Cleveland Cavaliers. During the game, he played for eight minutes and did not score. Gordon was then released by the Wizards on October 11, 2007.

=== Antalya Büyükşehir Belediyesi (2007–08) ===
After being cut from the Wizards, Gordon signed with the Antalya Büyükşehir Belediyesi of the Turkish League in November 2007. He played in 23 Turkish League regular season games, and had 248 points, 103 rebounds, and 68 assists. On March 8, 2008, he scored a season-high 18 points, along with grabbing four rebounds and dishing four assists, in a one-point loss against Oyak Renault. Antalya BSB made it to the Turkish League postseason, and lost their first round series to Fenerbahçe Ülker, 3–1. In the four playoff games, Gordon had 43 points, 20 rebounds, and eight assists.

=== 2008 NBA Summer League ===
After the end of his first BSL season, Gordon played in the 2008 NBA Summer League for the Denver Nuggets, in Las Vegas, from July 11 to the 20. In 5 games played in the summer league, he averaged 1.6 points, 1.8 rebounds, and 1.2 assists per game.

=== Trikala and Artland Dragons (2008) ===
On September 24, 2008, Gordon was then signed by Trikala 2000 of the Greek Basket League, but he was cut after preseason. Then in October 2008, he was signed by the Artland Dragons of the German BBL League, but he did not play in any games with them, and he was dropped from their team in November 2008.

=== Köln 99ers (2008–09) ===
After being cut by the Dragons, Gordon stayed in the BBL, and signed with the Köln 99ers, in November 2008. He played in nine German national league regular season games for the 99ers, and had 125 points, 38 rebounds, 37 assists, and 24 steals. On December 7, 2008, he scored a season-high 28 points, along with grabbing six rebounds and making five steals, in a loss against Paderborn.

=== Split (2009) ===
In January 2009, Gordon was signed by the Croatian A1 League club Split, of the Adriatic ABA League, which features teams from the former Socialist Federal Republic of Yugoslavia. He played his first game in the ABA on February 7, 2009, in a win against Krka, 86–71. In the game, he had 19 points and six rebounds. On March 19, 2009, Gordon scored a season-high 22 points in a loss to Hemofarm, 85–74. It was the final regular season game, and Split ended the ABA league season with a 10–6 record (tenth place). In the six ABA League games that he played in, Gordon had 116 points, 17 rebounds, 19 assists, and 15 steals.

Gordon made his Croatian A1 League debut on March 24, 2009, in a loss against Cibona, during which he had ten points, three rebounds, four assists, and three steals. On April 14, 2009, he scored a season-high 21 points, as well as grabbing six rebounds, making six assists, and taking six steals, in a win over Dubrovnik, 116–88. Split ended the season with an 8–6 record, which made them the fourth-ranked team in the postseason. They lost the semifinal series to Cibona, 2–0. In the two semifinal games, Gordon had 32 points, ten rebounds, eight assists, and seven steals. He finished the season with 211 points, 64 rebounds, 78 assists, and 49 steals.

=== Greece, Turkey and Italy (2009–17) ===
On August 3, 2009, Gordon signed with Greek club Maroussi for the 2009–10 season.

In August 2010, Gordon signed with Greek club Olympiacos for the 2010–11 season.

On July 1, 2011, Gordon signed with Turkish club Galatasaray for the 2011–12 season.

On July 10, 2012, he signed with Turkish club Anadolu Efes.

In July 2014, he signed a contract with the Turkish club Darüşşafaka.

On January 30, 2017, Gordon joined the Greek club Aris. On March 8, 2017, he left Aris.

On October 30, 2017, Gordon signed a contract with the Italian basketball team The Flexx Pistoia. On December 10, 2017, Gordon announced his retirement.

== Career statistics ==
Legend
GP	Games played	GS	Games started	MPG	Minutes per game
FG%	Field-goal percentage	3P%	3-point field-goal percentage	FT%	Free-throw percentage
RPG	Rebounds per game	APG	Assists per game	SPG	Steals per game
BPG	Blocks per game	PPG	Points per game	PIR	Performance index rating
**Bold**	Career high

=== EuroLeague ===
*	Led the league

Year	Team	GP	GS	MPG	FG%	3P%	FT%	RPG	APG	SPG	BPG	PPG	PIR
2009–10	Maroussi	16	16	30.1	.456	.233	.552	3.5	3.1	1.8	.3	**11.2**	11.1
2010–11	Olympiacos	19	7	19.5	.427	.308	.667	2.6	1.5	1.6	.2	4.5	6.1
2011–12	Galatasaray	16	12	25.6	.449	.304	.692	**4.1**	3.2	1.8*	.4	9.3	10.7
2012–13	Anadolu Efes	**29**	**26**	28.4	**.466**	.231	.745	4.0	4.0	1.8	.2	9.0	**11.6**
2013–14	Anadolu Efes	21	21	**32.0**	.417	.303	.654	3.2	**5.2**	**2.0***	**.5**	10.0	11.4
2015–16	Darüşşafaka	24	21	24.5	.429	**.395**	**.793**	2.6	3.5	1.6	.2	8.2	8.6
Career		125	103	26.8	.442	.298	.690	3.3	3.5	1.8	.3	8.6	10.0
