= Josh Shipp (basketball) =

American basketball player (born 1986)

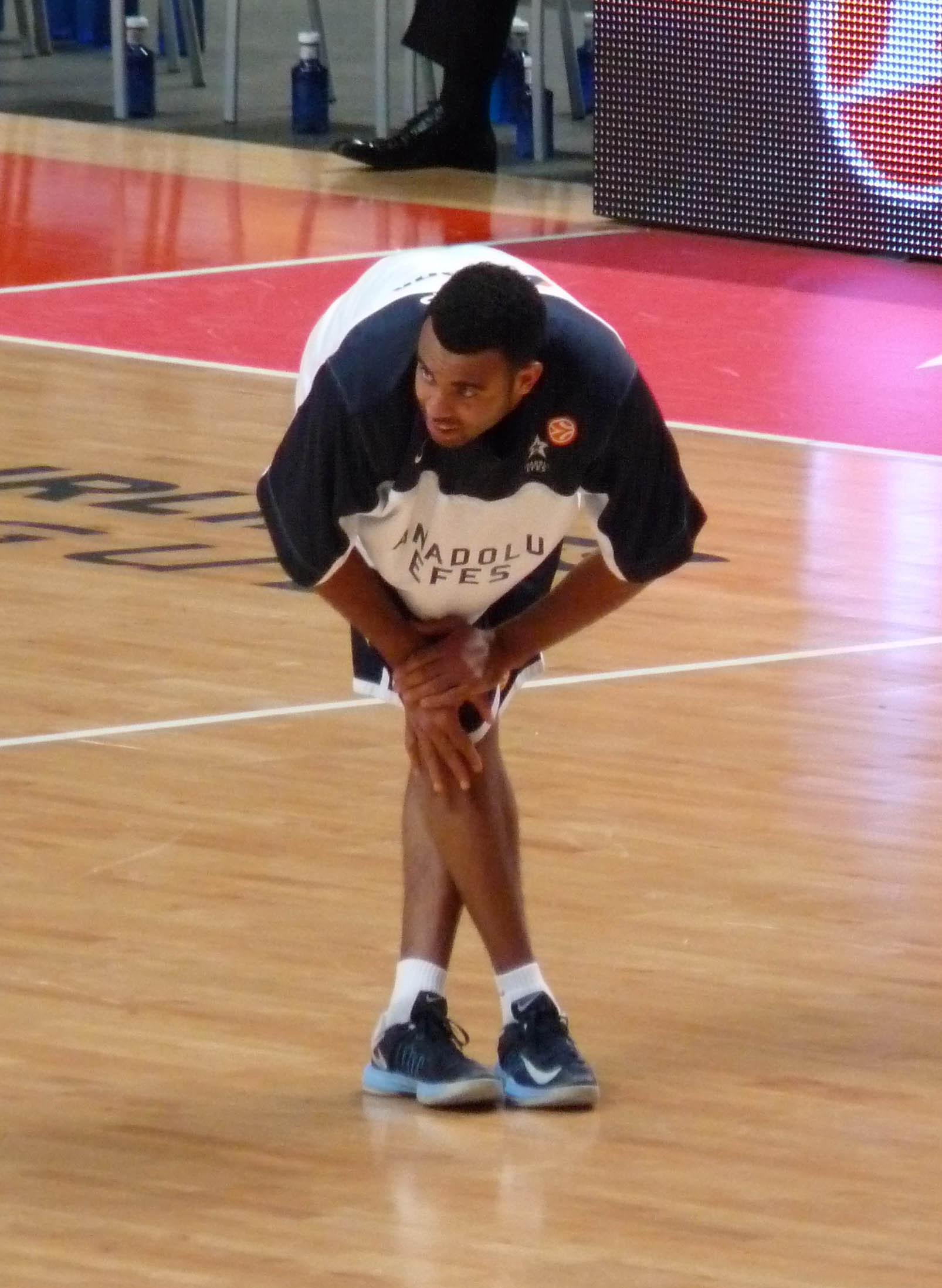
- Shipp playing for Anadolu Efes

Personal information
- Born: February 14, 1986 (age 40) Los Angeles, California, U.S.
- Listed height: 6 ft 5 in (1.96 m)
- Listed weight: 220 lb (100 kg)

Career information
- High school: Fairfax (Los Angeles, California)
- College: UCLA (2004–2009)
- NBA draft: 2009: undrafted
- Playing career: 2009–2015
- Position: Shooting guard / small forward

Career history
- 2009–2010: Bornova Belediye
- 2010–2012: Galatasaray Medical Park
- 2012–2013: Anadolu Efes
- 2013–2014: Türk Telekom
- 2014–2015: Brose Baskets

Career highlights
- Second-team All-Pac-10 (2009); Third-team Parade All-American (2004)

Joshua Ian Shipp (born February 14, 1986) is an American former professional basketball player. Shipp played college basketball for the UCLA Bruins, earning second-team all-conference honors in the Pac-12 as a senior in 2009. He played professionally in Turkey and Germany.

== High school ==
Under coach Harvey Kitani, Shipp led the Fairfax Lions to the California Division I state title. As a junior, he helped lead his team to the City finals and received All-State underclassman and All-City second-team honors.

== College ==
As a freshman at the University of California, Los Angeles, Shipp started 23 games for the Bruins and was named Honorable Mention All-Pac-10 Freshman. He averaged 9.3 points and 5.2 rebounds.

Shipp underwent surgery on his right hip on September 28, 2005, and missed the first 11 games. After playing four games, he missed the rest of the season with continual pain in his right hip.

In his third season, he started and played in 35 of the 36 games. In the Final Four loss to Florida, Shipp led the Bruins scoring (18 points), assists (5), and steals(4).

In his senior year with the Bruins, Shipp was the only player to start in all 39 games, playing in 1,269 minutes (32.5 mpg, 3rd all-time on UCLA's single-season list). Shipp was named the Bruins' co-Most Valuable Player (MVP) along with Darren Collison. He ended his career at UCLA No. 32 on the career list with 1,254 points. Shipp and fellow senior teammates Collison and Alfred Aboya finished their careers as the winningest class in UCLA history with 123 wins. The distinction was relative, as John Wooden's legendary teams played shorter seasons and freshmen were ineligible.

== Professional career ==
Shipp was not selected in the 2009 NBA draft, and was picked to play on the Chicago Bulls summer league team.

Shipp signed a contract with Bornova Belediye of the Turkish Basketball League.

In July 2010, Shipp transferred to Galatasaray Medical Park of the Turkish Basketball League.

On October 31, 2012, Shipp signed a contract with Anadolu Efes of the Turkish Basketball League.

In October 2014, Shipp signed a try-out contract for three weeks with Brose Baskets in Germany. According to his team he won't play any league games, but will be tested in training only. On November 10, 2014, after he passed the three-week tryout with the German powerhouse, he signed a contract for the rest of the 2014–15 season. He replaced an injured Carlon Brown. On January 11, 2015, he was released by Brose Baskets after playing 10 games in Basketball Bundesliga and seven in Eurocup.

== Career statistics ==
=== Professional ===
==== Domestic leagues ====
Season	Team	League	GP	MPG	FG%	FT%	3PT%	PPG	RPG	APG	SPG	BPG
2009-10	Bornova Belediye	Turkish Basketball League	33	27.1	55.2	67.4	32.6	18.8	5.1	2.3	1.9	0.2
2010-11	Galatasaray	Turkish Basketball League	39	36.4	57.0	72.4	26.3	9.3	5.1	1.4	1.3	0.2
2011-12	Galatasaray	Turkish Basketball League	20	21.3	57.9	77.8	39.0	10.4	4.1	1.5	1.0	0.5
2012-13	Anadolu Efes	Turkish Basketball League	16	23.4	67.6	70.8	31.4	10.3	3.0	1.8	0.8	0.3
2013-14	Türk Telekom	Turkish Basketball League	29	28.6	51.4	72.6	40.8	11.7	3.4	2.2	1.1	0.1

==== European Cups ====
Season	Team	League	GP	MPG	FG%	FT%	3PT%	PPG	RPG	APG	SPG	BPG	PIR
2010-11	Galatasaray	Eurocup	11	29.4	61.0	75.0	15.4	9.5	5.5	1.3	2.0	0.5	13.7
2011-12	Galatasaray	Euroleague	16	27.5	54.7	88.0	31.4	9.1	4.4	1.3	1.2	0.5	10.3
2012-13	Anadolu Efes	Euroleague	26	21.5	43.9	85.0	35.1	5.7	2.4	1.0	0.7	0.0	4.2

=== College ===
Year	Team	GP	GS	MPG	FG%	3P%	FT%	RPG	APG	SPG	BPG	PPG
2004-05	UCLA Bruins	29	23	27.9	.461	.281	.614	5.2	1.8	1.2	0.1	9.3
2005-06	UCLA Bruins	4	4	29.8	.410	.462	.875	4.8	1.0	0.5	0.3	11.3
2006-07	UCLA Bruins	35	35	30.1	.469	.316	.782	3.9	2.6	1.3	0.3	13.3
2007-08	UCLA Bruins	39	39	32.5	.434	.324	.770	3.2	2.1	1.3	0.4	12.2
2008-09	UCLA Bruins	33	33	29.2	.504	.433	.802	3.1	1.5	1.3	0.4	14.5
Career		140	134	29.9	.465	.345	.753	4.0	1.8	1.1	0.3	12.1

== Personal ==
Shipp has one older brother, Joe, who also played at Fairfax and went on to play for the California Golden Bears at the University of California, Berkeley. Joe led the Pac-10 in scoring in 2003, averaging 20.4 points. Shipp also has one younger brother, Jerren, who played at Arizona State. His sister, Brittney, is a meteorologist on television and an author.
