= Lukša Andrić =

Croatian basketball player

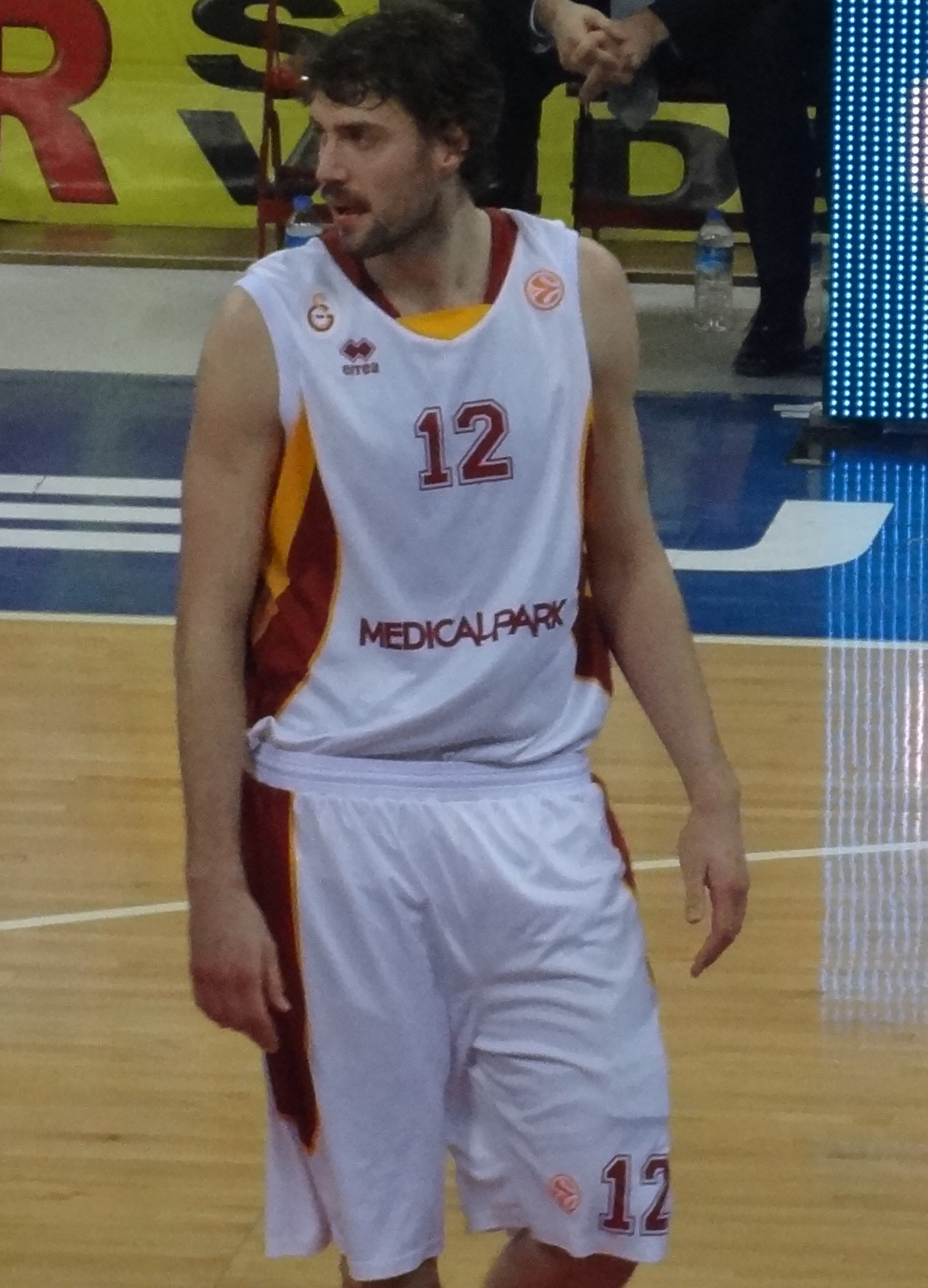
- Andrić with Galatasaray Medical Park

Personal information
- Born: January 29, 1985 (age 41) Dubrovnik, SR Croatia, SFR Yugoslavia
- Listed height: 6 ft 10.5 in (2.10 m)
- Listed weight: 275 lb (125 kg)

Career information
- NBA draft: 2007: undrafted
- Playing career: 2001–2019
- Position: Center
- Number: 4

Career history
- 2001–2002: Dubrovnik
- 2002–2003: Cibona Juniors
- 2003–2005: Dubrava
- 2005–2010: Cibona
- 2010–2012: Galatasaray Medical Park
- 2012–2013: Cedevita
- 2013–2014: Türk Telekom
- 2014–2015: Astana
- 2016: ICL Manresa
- 2016–2019: Szolnoki Olaj
Medals
Men's basketball
Representing Croatia
Mediterranean Games
Gold medal – first place	2009 Pescara	Team Competition

Lukša Andrić (born January 29, 1985) is a Croatian former professional basketball player. He stands 2.10 m tall and played center.

== Croatian national team ==
He was also a regular Croatia national basketball team player.
