= Terrell Lyday =

American former professional basketball player

Personal information
- Born: August 12, 1979 (age 46) Fresno, California, U.S.
- Listed height: 6 ft 3 in (1.91 m)
- Listed weight: 200 lb (91 kg)

Career information
- High school: Herbert Hoover (Fresno, California)
- College: Fresno CC (1997–1999); BYU (1999–2001)
- NBA draft: 2001: undrafted
- Playing career: 2001–2013
- Position: Shooting guard

Career history
- 2001–2002: Unia Tarnów
- 2002–2003: Galatasaray
- 2003–2004: Cholet
- 2004–2005: ASVEL
- 2005–2006: Ural Great
- 2006–2007: Benetton
- 2007–2008: Triumph Lyubertsy
- 2008–2013: UNICS Kazan

Career highlights
- EuroCup champion (2011); All-EuroCup First Team (2011); FIBA EuroCup Challenge champion (2006); Italian Cup winner (2007); Italian Supercup winner (2006); Russian Cup winner (2009); Russian League All-Symbolic Second Team (2011); LNB All-Star (2005)

Terrell Lyday (born August 12, 1979) is an American former professional basketball player. Standing at 6 ft 3 in (1.91 m), he played at the shooting guard position.

== College career ==
Lyday played college basketball at Fresno CC (NJCAA), from 1997 to 1999, and at BYU (NCAA Division I), from 1999 to 2001.

== Professional career ==
Lyday started his professional career in 2001 with Polish club Unia Tarnów. For the 2002–03 he moved to Turkish club Galatasaray. For the 2003–04 season he signed with French club Cholet, and for the next season he also played in France but with ASVEL. In the 2005–06 season he played with Russian club Ural Great and won the FIBA EuroCup Challenge.

In the 2006–07 season he played with Italian club Benetton Treviso and won the Italian Cup and the Supercup. In the 2007–08 season he played with Russian club Triumph Lyubertsy. In June 2008, he signed with Russian club UNICS Kazan. With UNICS he won the Russian Cup in 2009. In 2011, he won the EuroCup, and was named to the All-EuroCup First Team of the 2010–11 season. In June 2011, he extended his contract with UNICS Kazan for two more years. After the end of the 2012–13 season, he finished his professional career.
