= Galatasaray S.K. men's basketball team rosters =

This article contains past rosters of the Galatasaray S.K. (men's basketball) team.

== 1980s ==
=== 1983–84 ===
Roster

- (Turkey) Mehmet Altıoklar
- (Turkey) Hasan Arat
- (Turkey) Mehmet Baç
- (United States) Paul Dawkins
- (Turkey) Turgay Demirel
- (Turkey) Remzi Dilli
- (Turkey) Okan Gedik
- (Turkey) Nihat İziç
- (Turkey) Cihat Levent
- (Turkey) Mehmet Şenova
- (Turkey) Aydın Yılmaztürk
- Coach: (Turkey) Mehmet Baturalp

=== 1984–85 ===
Roster

- (Turkey) Mehmet Altıoklar
- (Turkey) Mehmet Baç
- (United States) Paul Dawkins
- (Turkey) Turgay Demirel
- (Turkey) Remzi Dilli
- (Turkey) Okan Gedik
- (Turkey) Nihat İziç
- (Turkey) Cihat Levent
- (United States) Michaelle Scearce
- (Turkey) Mehmet Şenova
- Coach: (Turkey) Mehmet Baturalp / (Turkey) Nur Germen / (Turkey) Yalçın Granit / (Turkey) Halil Üner

=== 1985–86 ===
Roster

- (Turkey) Mehmet Altıoklar
- (Turkey) Mehmet Baç
- (Turkey) Cem Caniklioğlu
- (United States) Paul Dawkins
- (Turkey) Turgay Demirel
- (Turkey) Okan Gedik
- (Turkey) Bülent Ildiz
- (Turkey) Nihat İziç
- (Turkey) Cihat Levent
- (United States) Michaelle Scearce
- (Turkey) Mehmet Şenova
- (Turkey) Turgut Tayyar
- (Turkey) Mehmet Ali Tlabar
- Coach: (Turkey) Fehmi Sadıkoğlu

=== 1986–87 ===
Roster

- (Turkey) Hüseyin Buğdaycı
- (Turkey) Ömer Büyükaycan
- (Turkey) Erol Çapar
- (Turkey) Çağatay Çırpıcıoğlu
- (United States) Paul Dawkins
- (Turkey) Turgay Demirel
- (Turkey) Kaan Gedik
- (Turkey) Nihat İziç
- (Turkey) Cihat Levent
- (United States) Calvin Roberts
- (Turkey) Mehmet Şenova
- (Turkey) Turgut Tayyar
- (Turkey) Mehmet Ali Tlabar
- Coach: (Turkey) Fehmi Sadıkoğlu / (Turkey) Özer Salnur / (Turkey) Halil Üner

=== 1987–88 ===
Roster

- (Turkey) Hasan Başar
- (Turkey) Hüseyin Buğdaycı
- (Turkey) Ömer Büyükaycan
- (Turkey) Cem Caniklioğlu
- (Turkey) Erol Çapar
- (Turkey) Çağatay Çırpıcıoğlu
- (United States) Paul Dawkins
- (Turkey) Turgay Demirel
- (Turkey) Kerim Durmaz
- (Turkey) Kaan Gedik
- (United States) Anthony Hackett
- (Turkey) Ömer Kart
- (Turkey) Namık Kayaoğlu
- (Turkey) Murat Oktay
- (Turkey) Mehmet Şenova
- (Turkey) Turgut Tayyar
- (Turkey) Mehmet Ali Tlabar
- (Turkey) Cem Usta
- Coach: (United States) Jack Avina

=== 1988–89 ===
Roster

- (Turkey) Lütfi Arıboğan
- (Turkey) Hüseyin Buğdaycı
- (Turkey) Ömer Büyükaycan
- (Turkey) Cem Caniklioğlu
- (Turkey) Çağatay Çırpıcıoğlu
- (United States) Paul Dawkins
- (United States) Arthur Housey
- (Turkey) Ömer Kart
- (Turkey) Ekrem Memnun
- (Turkey) Ferhat Oktay
- (Turkey) Fatih Özal
- (Turkey) Mehmet Şenova
- (Turkey) Mehmet Ali Tlabar
- (Turkey) Cem Usta
- Coach: (United States) Jack Avina / (Turkey) Koray Mincinozlu

=== 1989–90 ===
Roster

- (United States) Pete Williams
- (Turkey) Burçin Badem
- (Turkey) Cem Caniklioğlu
- (Turkey) Cem Usta
- (Turkey) Emir Turam
- (Turkey) Hakan Yörükoğlu
- (Turkey) Hüseyin Buğdaycı
- (Turkey) Lütfi Arıboğan
- (Turkey) Ömer Kart
- (Turkey) Recep Şen
- (Turkey) Yalçın Küçüközkan
- (Turkey) Yusuf Erboy
- Coach: (Turkey) Faruk Akagün

== 1990s ==
=== 1990–91 ===
Roster

- (Turkey) Lütfü Arıboğan
- (Turkey) Burçin Badem
- (Turkey) Cem Caniklioğlu
- (Turkey) Barış Kaçar
- (Turkey) Ali Kart
- (Turkey) Ömer Kart
- (Turkey) Hakan Yörükoğlu
- (Turkey) Ömer Saybir
- (Turkey) Erol Pehlivan
- (Turkey) Murat Oktay
- (United States) Damary Riddick
- (United States) Antonio Massop
- Coach: (Turkey) Faruk Akagün

=== 1991–92 ===
Roster

- (Turkey) Lütfü Arıboğan
- (Turkey) Burçin Badem
- (Turkey) Cem Caniklioğlu
- (Turkey) Selim Demir
- (United States) Ronald Draper
- (Turkey) Noyan Ozler
- (Turkey) Yiğit Özmen
- (United States) Jim Paul
- (Turkey) Ömer Saybir
- (Turkey) Mert Uyguç
- (Turkey) Murat Yenal
- (Turkey) Hakan Yörükoğlu
- Coach: (Turkey) Hakan Yavuz

=== 1992–93 ===
Roster

- (United States) Allan Gray
- (Turkey) Burçin Badem
- (United States) Cosby Coles
- (United States) David Butler
- (Turkey) Fatih Kol
- (Turkey) Hakan Yörükoğlu
- (Turkey) Kemal Tunçeri
- (United States) Larry McCloud
- (Turkey) Lütfü Arıboğan
- (Turkey) Mert Uyguç
- (Turkey) Murat Dak
- (Turkey) Murat Oktay
- (Turkey) Ozan Korkut
- (Turkey) Samer Şenbayrak
- (Turkey) Selim Demir
- (Turkey) Serdar Apaydın
- (Turkey) Şafak Telli
- (Turkey) Yiğit Özmen
- Coach: (Turkey) Hakan Yavuz / (Turkey) Mehmet Baturalp

=== 1993–94 ===
Roster

- (Turkey) Asım Pars
- (Turkey) Burak Sezgin
- (Turkey) Burçin Badem
- (Turkey) Cem Kulaksız
- (United States) Derrick Gervin
- (United States) Eldridge Recasner
- (Turkey) Erman Şahbazoğlu
- (Turkey) Hakan Yörükoğlu
- (United States) Keith Hughes
- (Turkey) Mert Uyguç
- (Turkey) Samer Şenbayrak
- (United States) Scott Meents
- (Turkey) Selim Demir
- (United States) Thomas Gneiting
- (Turkey) Yiğit Özmen
- Coach: (Turkey) Aydan Siyavuş

=== 1994–95 ===
Roster

- (Turkey) Burak Sezgin
- (United States) Davit Henderson
- (United States) Derrel Hodges
- (United States) Gaylon Nickerson
- (United States) Jevon Crudup
- (Turkey) Levent Topsakal
- (Turkey) Lütfü Arıboğan
- (Turkey) Mert Uyguç
- (Turkey) Murat Oktay
- (Turkey) Ömer Büyükaycan
- (Turkey) Ömer Kart
- (Turkey) Rıza Aşkın Gür
- (Turkey) Rüçhan Tamsöz
- (Turkey) Samer Şenbayrak
- (Turkey) Selim Demir
- (Turkey) Yiğit Özmen
- Coach: (Turkey) Aydan Siyavuş

=== 1995–96 ===
Roster

- (Turkey) Barış Kaçar
- (Turkey) Burak Sezgin
- (United States) Corey Gaines
- (United States) Erik Meek
- (Turkey) Hüseyin Buğdaycı
- (Turkey) Levent Topsakal
- (Turkey) Lütfü Arıboğan
- (Turkey) Mert Uyguç
- (Turkey) Mete Felek
- (Turkey) Murat Oktay
- (Turkey) Ömer Büyükaycan
- (Turkey) Ömer Kart
- (Turkey) Selim Demir
- (Turkey) Yiğit Özmen
- Coach: (Turkey) Aydan Siyavuş

=== 1996–97 ===
Roster

- (Turkey) Barış Kaçar
- (Turkey) Burak Sezgin
- (United States) Dennis Hopson
- (Turkey) Gökhan Üçoklar
- (Latvia) Gundars Vētra
- (Turkey) Hüseyin Buğdaycı
- (United States) Joe Vogel
- (Turkey) Kerem Tunçeri
- (Turkey) Ömer Büyükaycan
- (Turkey) Ömer Kart
- (Turkey) Selim Demir
- (United States) Sherron Mills
- (United States) Tim Kempton
- (Turkey) Yiğit Özmen
- Coach: (Turkey) Hakan Yavuz / (Turkey) Cem Gökçe

=== 1997–98 ===
Roster

- (United States) Anthony Bonner
- (Turkey) Burak Sezgin
- (Turkey) Gökhan Üçoklar
- (Turkey) Hüseyin Buğdaycı
- (Nigeria) Julius Nwosu
- (United States) Kenneth Allen Miller
- (Turkey) Kerem Tunçeri
- (United States) Larry Stewart
- (United States) Lloyd Daniels
- (Turkey) Mert Uyguç
- (Turkey) Orhun Ene
- (Turkey) Selim Demir
- (United States) Sherron Mills
- (Turkey) Teoman Öztürk
- (Turkey) Yiğit Özmen
- Coach: (Turkey) Aydan Siyavuş / (Turkey) Tolga Tuğsavul / (Turkey) Koray Mincinozlu

=== 1998–99 ===
Roster

- (United States) Bennett Davison
- (Turkey) Burak Sezgin
- (Turkey) Ersin Görkem
- (Turkey) Gökhan Üçoklar
- (Turkey) Hüseyin Buğdaycı
- (Turkey) Kerem Tunçeri
- (Turkey) Orhun Ene
- (United States) Patrick Durham
- (Slovakia) Richard Petruška
- (Turkey) Selim Demir
- (Turkey) Teoman Öztürk
- (United States) Tim Breaux
- Coach: (Turkey) Koray Mincinozlu

=== 1999–00 ===
Roster

- (United States) Ben Handlogten
- (Turkey) Burak Sezgin
- (Turkey) Ersin Görkem
- (Turkey) Gökhan Üçoklar
- (Turkey) Hüseyin Buğdaycı
- (Turkey) Kerem Tunçeri
- (Croatia) Matej Mamić
- (Turkey) Orhun Ene
- (Turkey) Önder Külçebaş
- (United States) Quadre Lollis
- (Turkey) Selim Demir
- Coach: (Turkey) Fehmi Sadıkoğlu / (Turkey) Murat Didin / (Turkey) Ömer Petorak

== 2000s ==
=== 2000–01 ===
Roster

- (Belarus) Alexander Koul
- (Turkey) Arda Vekiloğlu
- (United States) Brian Keith Tolbert
- (United States) Dell Demps
- (Turkey) Ersin Görkem
- (Bosnia and Herzegovina) Haris Mujezinovic
- (Turkey) Hüseyin Buğdaycı
- (United States) Lavon Walls
- (Turkey) Mehmet Baras
- (Turkey) Murat Konuk
- (Turkey) Mustafa Kemal Bitim
- (Turkey) Orhun Ene
- (Turkey) Önder Külçebaş
- (Turkey) Selim Demir
- (Turkey) Serdar Tabay
- (United States) Terquin Mott
- (Turkey) Yiğit Özmen
- Coach: (Turkey) Koray Mincinozlu

=== 2001–02 ===
Roster

- (Turkey) Ahmet Yılmaz
- (Turkey) Can Duraslan
- (United States) Chris Herren
- (United States) David Moseley
- (Turkey) Ersin Görkem
- (Turkey) Kemal Tunçeri
- (Poland) Krzystof Willangowski
- (United States) Lee Matthews
- (Turkey) Mehmet Baras
- (Turkey) Önder Külçebaş
- (Turkey) Serdar Tabay
- (Turkey) Şemsettin Baş
- (Turkey) Tamer Oyguç
- (Bosnia and Herzegovina) Tarik Valjevac
- (Turkey) Yiğit Özmen
- Coach: (Turkey) Koray Mincinozlu

=== 2002–03 ===
Roster

- (United States) Aaron Mitchell
- (Turkey) Ali Ton
- (Turkey) Arda Vekiloğlu
- (Turkey) Ersin Görkem
- (Turkey) Fatih Altın
- (United States) Geoffrey Owens
- (United States) Jason Robert Koch
- (Turkey) Muratcan Güler
- (Turkey) Önder Külçebaş
- (United States) Roy Hairston
- (Turkey) Sedat Asarcıklı
- (Turkey) Serdar Tabay
- (Turkey) Şemsettin Baş
- (United States) Terrell Lyday
- (United States) Thomas Kelley
- (Turkey) Yiğit Özmen
- Coach: (Turkey) Erman Kunter

=== 2003–04 ===
Roster

- (Turkey) Arda Vekiloğlu
- (Turkey) Burak Sezgin
- (Turkey) Cenk Duraklar
- (Turkey) Cihad Şahin
- (Turkey) Denktaş Güney
- (United States) Frankie King
- (Turkey) Gürcan Cüceloğlu
- (Turkey) Gürol Karamahmut
- (Turkey) Kadir Saygılı
- (Turkey) Kemal Tunçeri
- (Panama) Kevin Daley
- (United States) Ron Slay
- (Latvia) Sandis Buškevics
- (Turkey) Sedat Asarcıklı
- (Turkey) Serhat Azizağaoğlu
- (Turkey) Tufan Ersöz
- (United States) Tyrone Washington
- (Nigeria) Uche Amadi
- (Turkey) Yiğit Özmen
- Coach: (Turkey) Halil Üner

=== 2004–05 ===
Roster

- (Turkey) Arda Vekiloğlu
- (United States) Brian Boddicker
- (Turkey) Burak Sezgin
- (Turkey) Cihad Şahin
- (United States) Donald Eugenie Little
- (Turkey) Enver Ekmen
- (Brazil) Estevam Ferreira
- (Turkey) Fatih Ünal
- (Turkey) Gökhan Üçoklar
- (Turkey) İsmet Hacıoğlu
- (United States) Jason Keep
- (Turkey) Kaan Atıkır
- (Turkey) Mert Uyguç
- (Turkey) Melih Kanlı
- (United States) Nick Jacobson
- (Turkey) Orhan Güler
- (United States) Ron Johnson
- (Turkey) Umut Tınay
- (Turkey) Ufuk Gürgen
- Coach: (Turkey) Halil Üner

=== 2005–06 ===
Roster

- (Turkey) Burak Sezgin
- (United States) Chris Garnett
- (United States) DeSean Hadley
- (Turkey) Fatih Solak
- (Turkey) Fatih Ünal
- (Turkey) Hüseyin Demiral
- (United States) Glen Whisby
- (Turkey) Gökhan Üçoklar
- (Turkey) İsmet Hacıoğlu
- (United States) Malik Dixon
- (Turkey) Mehmet Baras
- (United States) Randy Livingston
- (Turkey) Serhat Çetin
- (Turkey) Şemsettin Baş
- (Turkey) Umut Yenice
- (Turkey) Valentin Pastal
- Coach: (Turkey) Halil Üner

=== 2006–07 ===
Roster

- (Turkey) Altay Özurgancı
- (Turkey) Burak Sezgin
- (Turkey) Cemal Nalga
- (United States) Darrel Mitchell
- (Canada) Denham Brown
- (Turkey) Fatih Solak
- (United States) Gerald Fitch
- (United States) Glen McGowan
- (Turkey) İsmet Hacıoğlu
- (United States) Jeff Graves
- (United States) Jerral Holman
- (Turkey) (Germany) Mithat Demirel
- (Turkey) Murat Kaya
- (Turkey) Tolga Tekinalp
- (Turkey) Tufan Ersöz
- Coach: (Turkey) Murat Özyer

=== 2007–08 ===
Roster

- (Turkey) Altay Özurgancı
- (United States) Britton Johnsen
- (Turkey) Cenk Akyol
- (Turkey) Cemal Nalga
- (United States) Charles Gaines
- (United States) Chris Owens
- (Turkey) Cüneyt Erden
- (United States) Dee Brown
- (Turkey) Erdem Türetken
- (Turkey) Fatih Solak
- (Turkey) Hüseyin Beşok
- (Turkey) Murat Kaya
- (United States) Robert Hite
- (Turkey) Tufan Ersöz
- Coach: (Turkey) Murat Özyer

=== 2008–09 ===
Roster

- (Turkey) Alican Güney
- (Turkey) Altay Özurgancı
- (Turkey) Cemal Nalga
- (Turkey) Cüneyt Erden
- (Turkey) Erdem Türetken
- (Turkey) Hüseyin Beşok
- (Turkey) Murat Kaya
- (Turkey) Polat Kocaoğlu
- (Turkey) Teoman Örge
- (Turkey) Tufan Ersöz
- (United States) Antonio Graves
- (United States) Anthony Tolliver
- (United States) Marshall Strickland
- (United States) Rashid Atkins
- (United States) Quinton Hosley
- (Croatia) Andrija Žižić
- (Serbia) Dejan Milojević
- (Serbia) Milan Gurović
- Coach: (Turkey) Murat Özyer / Koray Mincinozlu

=== 2009–10 ===
Roster

- (Turkey) Alican Güney
- (Turkey) Can Akın
- (Turkey) Caner Topaloğlu
- (Turkey) Cemal Nalga
- (Turkey) Eren Beyaz
- (Turkey) Evren Büker
- (Turkey) Fatih Solak
- (Turkey) Göksenin Köksal
- (Turkey) Murat Kaya
- (Turkey) Polat Kocaoğlu
- (Turkey) Tufan Ersöz
- (Turkey) Teoman Örge
- (Slovakia) Radoslav Rančík
- (United States) (North Macedonia) Darius Washington, Jr.
- (United States) (North Macedonia) Mike Wilkinson
- (Lithuania) Simas Jasaitis
- Coach: (Turkey) Okan Çevik / Cem Akdağ

== 2010s ==
=== 2010–11 ===
Roster

- (Turkey) Caner Topaloğlu
- (Turkey) Doğukan Sönmez
- (Albania) (Turkey) Ermal Kuqo
- (Turkey) Evren Büker
- (Turkey) Haluk Yıldırım
- (Turkey) Hüseyin Göksenin Köksal
- (United States) Jerry Johnson
- (United States) Josh Shipp
- (Croatia) Lukša Andrić
- (Turkey) Melih Mahmutoğlu
- (Turkey) Muhammed Baygül
- (United States) (Turkey) Preston Shumpert
- (Slovakia) Radoslav Rančík
- (Turkey) Sertaç Şanlı
- (United States) Taylor Rochestie
- (Turkey) Tutku Açık
- Coach: (Turkey) Oktay Mahmuti

=== 2011–12 ===
Roster

- (Serbia) (Montenegro) Boris Savović
- (Turkey) Caner Topaloğlu
- (Turkey) Cevher Özer
- (Lithuania) Darius Songaila
- (Turkey) Ender Arslan
- (Turkey) Evren Büker
- (Turkey) Furkan Aldemir
- (Turkey) Haluk Yıldırım
- (Turkey) Göksenin Köksal
- (Slovenia) Jaka Lakovič
- (United States) Jamon Gordon
- (United States) Josh Shipp
- (Croatia) Lukša Andrić
- (Bosnia and Herzegovina) Nihad Đedović
- (United States) (Turkey) Preston Shumpert
- (Turkey) Sertaç Şanlı
- (Turkey) Tutku Açık
- (Georgia (country)) Zaza Pachulia
- Coach: (Turkey) Oktay Mahmuti

=== 2012–13 ===
Roster

- (Senegal) (Germany) Boniface N'Dong
- (Turkey) Can Korkmaz
- (Puerto Rico) Carlos Arroyo
- (Turkey) Cenk Akyol
- (United States) David Hawkins
- (Turkey) Doğukan Sönmez
- (Turkey) Ender Arslan
- (Turkey) Engin Atsür
- (Turkey) (United States) Erwin Dudley
- (Turkey) Furkan Aldemir
- (Bosnia and Herzegovina) (United States) Henry Domercant
- (Turkey) Göksenin Köksal
- (United States) Jamont Gordon
- (Slovenia) Jaka Lakovič
- (Georgia (country)) Manuchar Markoishvili
- (Serbia) Milan Mačvan
- (Turkey) Sertaç Şanlı
- Coach: (Turkey) Ergin Ataman

=== 2013–14 ===
Roster

- (Turkey) Cenk Akyol
- (Turkey) Furkan Aldemir
- (Puerto Rico) Carlos Arroyo
- (Turkey) Ender Arslan
- (Turkey) Engin Atsür
- (Bosnia and Herzegovina) (United States) Henry Domercant
- (Turkey) (United States) Erwin Dudley
- (Serbia) Zoran Erceg
- (United States) Jamont Gordon
- (Turkey) Sinan Güler
- (United States) Malik Hairston
- (Australia) Nathan Jawai
- (Turkey) Göksenin Köksal
- (Serbia) Milan Mačvan
- (Georgia (country)) Manuchar Markoishvili
- (England) Pops Mensah-Bonsu
- (Turkey) Şuacan Pişkin
- (Turkey) Doğukan Sönmez
- Coach: (Turkey) Ergin Ataman

=== 2014–15 ===
Roster

- (Turkey) Ege Arar
- (Turkey) Ender Arslan
- (Turkey) Kerem Gönlüm
- (Turkey) Sinan Güler
- (Turkey) Berkay Kansu
- (Turkey) Lazgin Emre Özkanlı
- (Turkey) Şuacan Pişkin
- (Turkey) Murat Ünlütürk
- (Turkey) Göktürk Gökalp Ural
- (Turkey) Furkan Aldemir
- (North Macedonia) (Turkey) Kristijan Nikolov
- (Serbia) Zoran Erceg
- (Serbia) Vladimir Micov
- (Serbia) Aleks Marić
- (United States) Nolan Smith
- (United States) Justin Carter
- (United States) Patric Young
- (Puerto Rico) Carlos Arroyo
- (Italy) Pietro Aradori
- (Australia) Nathan Jawai
- (Lithuania) Martynas Pocius
- Coach: (Turkey) Ergin Ataman

=== 2015–16 ===
Roster

- (Turkey) Kutay Akpulat
- (Turkey) Ege Arar
- (Turkey) Dusan Cantekin
- (Turkey) İzzet Türkyılmaz
- (Turkey) Şafak Edge
- (Turkey) Sinan Güler
- (Turkey) Doğukan Şanlı
- (Turkey) Göksenin Köksal
- (Serbia) Vladimir Micov
- (United States) Bernard James
- (United States) Joey Dorsey
- (United States) Blake Schilb
- (United States) Errick McCollum
- (United States) Curtis Jerrells
- (United States) Charles Davis
- (United States) Caleb Green
- (Gabon) Stéphane Lasme
- Coach: (Turkey) Ergin Ataman

=== 2016–17 ===
Roster

- (Turkey) Ege Arar
- (Turkey) Serkan Aydın
- (Turkey) Sinan Güler
- (Turkey) Mehmet Utku Tuğsal
- (Turkey) Göksenin Köksal
- (Turkey) Can Korkmaz
- (Turkey) Doğukan Şanlı
- (Azerbaijan) (Turkey) Orhan Hacıyeva
- (Slovenia) (Turkey) Emir Preldžić
- (Germany) Tibor Pleiß
- (Serbia) Vladimir Micov
- (Uruguay) Bruno Fitipaldo
- (United States) (Czech Republic) Blake Schilb
- (United States) Austin Daye
- (United States) Jon Diebler
- (United States) Errick McCollum
- (United States) Alex Tyus
- (United States) Justin Dentmon
- (United States) Russ Smith
- (United States) Deon Thompson
- Coach: (Turkey) Ergin Ataman

=== 2017–18 ===
Roster

- (United States) Dwight Hardy
- (United States) Richard Hendrix
- (United States) DaJuan Summers
- (United States) Jordan Taylor
- (United States) Rakeem Christmas
- (United States) T. J. Cline
- (United States) Scotty Hopson
- (United States) Alex Renfroe
- (United States) Henry Walker
- (Turkey) Ege Arar
- (Turkey) Serkan Aydın
- (Turkey) Göksenin Köksal
- (Turkey) Caner Topaloğlu
- (Turkey) Mehmet Yağmur
- (Turkey) Serhat Tüzinoğlu
- (Lithuania) Adas Juškevičius
- (Slovenia) (Turkey) Emir Preldžić
- Coach: (Turkey) Oktay Mahmuti / (Turkey) Erman Kunter

=== 2018–19 ===
Roster

- (Turkey) Ege Arar
- (Turkey) Göksenin Köksal
- (Turkey) Can Korkmaz
- (Turkey) Ayberk Olmaz
- (Turkey) Emir Gökalp
- (Turkey) Erolcan Çinko
- (Turkey) Caner Erdeniz
- (Turkey) Serkan Aydın
- (Slovenia) Jaka Klobučar
- (Romania) Cem Kılıç Karakuş
- (Croatia) Marko Arapović
- (United States) Zach Auguste
- (United States) Aaron Harrison
- (United States) Nigel Hayes
- (New Zealand) Tai Webster
- Coach: (Turkey) Ertuğrul Erdoğan

=== 2019–20 ===
Roster

- (Turkey) Ege Arar
- (Turkey) Yiğit Arslan
- (Turkey) Serkan Aydın
- (Turkey) Caner Erdeniz
- (Turkey) Emir Gökalp
- (Turkey) Can Korkmaz
- (Turkey) Göksenin Köksal
- (Turkey) Ayberk Olmaz
- (Turkey) Mehmet Utku Tuğsal
- (United States) Zach Auguste
- (United States) Aaron Harrison
- (United States) Lazeric Jones
- (United States) Alex Poythress
- (United States) John Roberson
- (United States) Greg Whittington
- (United States) Greg Whittington
- (United States) Ben Moore
- (New Zealand) Tai Webster
- Coach: (Turkey) Ertuğrul Erdoğan

== 2020s ==
=== 2020–21 ===
Roster

- (Turkey) Ayberk Olmaz
- (Turkey) Barış Ermiş
- (Turkey) Berke Atar
- (Turkey) Caner Erdeniz
- (Turkey) Emir Oflaz
- (Turkey) Eray Aydoğan
- (Turkey) Göksenin Köksal
- (Turkey) Saadettin Donat
- (Turkey) Yiğit Arslan
- (Australia) Brock Motum
- (Egypt) Assem Marei
- (United States) Amile Jefferson
- (United States) Alex Tyus
- (United States) Alex Hamilton
- (United States) Daryl Macon
- (United States) Johnathan Williams
- (United States) Jordan Crawford
- (United States) R. J. Hunter
- (United States) Pierre Jackson
- (United States) Travis Trice
- Coach: (Turkey) Ertuğrul Erdoğan / (Turkey) Ömer Uğurata / (Turkey) Ekrem Memnun

=== 2021–22 ===
Roster

- (Turkey) Acar Şen
- (Turkey) Canberk Kuş
- (Turkey) Ege Arar
- (Turkey) Eray Aydoğan
- (Turkey) Göksenin Köksal
- (Turkey) Rıdvan Öncel
- (Turkey) Sadık Emir Kabaca
- (Turkey) Okben Ulubay
- (United States) David Kravish
- (Bulgaria) Dee Bost
- (United States) DeVaughn Akoon-Purcell
- (United States) Isaiah Canaan
- (United States) Kerry Blackshear Jr.
- (Senegal) Maurice Ndour
- (United States) Melo Trimble
- (Serbia) Vasilije Pušica
- Coach: (Turkey) Ekrem Memnun / (Greece) Andreas Pistiolis
