= Okan Çevik =

Turkish basketball coach (born 1966)

Personal information
- Born: June 8, 1966 (age 60) Edirne, Turkey
- Position: Head coach
- Coaching career: 1992–present

Career history

Coaching
- 1992–1995: Yıldırımspor
- 1995–1998: Tofaş (assistant)
- 1998–1999: Konya Kombassan
- 1999–2000: Karagücü
- 2000–2002: Oyak Renault
- 2002–2003: TED Ankara Kolejliler
- 2003–2005: Darüşşafaka
- 2005: Tekelspor
- 2006–2007: Pınar Karşıyaka
- 2007–2008: TTNet Beykoz
- 2008–2009: Galatasaray (Women)
- 2009: Galatasaray Café Crown
- 2014–2015: Denizli Basket
- 2015–2016: Sakarya BB

Career highlights
- EuroCup Women champion (2009); FIBA Korać Cup runners-up (1997); Saporta Cup semi-final (1994); Turkish Women's Cup Basketball runners-up (2009); 2x Turkish Second Basketball League champion

Okan Çevik (born 8 June 1966 in Edirne, Turkey) is a Turkish professional basketball coach. Çevik studied at Galatasaray High School and graduated from Istanbul University Faculty of Dentistry.

== Coaching career ==
=== Early years ===
Çevik, began his career in Galatasaray Youth Team in 1983.

=== Galatasaray ===
In 2009, he signed with Galatasaray Women's Basketball Team. He won EuroCup Women this season. Next season, he signed with Galatasaray Café Crown. But after Jersey scandal, he has been banned for three-years from basketball in Turkey.

== Jersey scandal ==
Çevik is also known for a major scandal in Turkish Professional Basketball. At the beginning of the 2009–2010 season, Cemal Nalga got a five match suspension during 23 September 2009 match against Cibona Zagreb. But, he later played in a friendly match against EnBW Ludwigsburg and Deutsche Bank Skyliners with coaching decision and wore the uniform of his good friend Tufan's number 7. He also been with Tufan Ersöz name in matches list. Nalga later received a two-year suspension in Turkey. Tufan also received a four-month suspension for his actions. And coach Çevik, has been banned for three-years.
