= Basketbol Süper Ligi season assists leaders =

The Basketbol Süper Ligi season assists leader, is the season assists per game leader of the Turkish top-tier level professional basketball league, the Basketbol Süper Ligi (BSL).

== Assists leaders ==
Season	Assists leader	Team	APG	Ref.
2004–05	(New Zealand) (Australia) Mark Dickel	Erdemirspor	8.7	
2005–06	(Turkey) Kerem Tunçeri	Beşiktaş Cola Turka	6.4	
2006–07	(United States) (North Macedonia) Marques Green	CASA TED Kolejliler	5.6	
2007–08	(Turkey) Hakan Köseoğlu	Kepez Belediyespor	6.9	
2008–09	(Turkey) Hakan Köseoğlu (×2)	Pınar Karşıyaka	8.0	
2009–10	(Turkey) Hakan Köseoğlu (×3)	Erdemir Zonguldak	8.8	
2010–11	(Turkey) Barış Ermiş	Banvit	6.3	
2011–12	(United States) Mire Chatman	Pınar Karşıyaka	6.4	
2012–13	(United States) Ben Woodside	TED Ankara Kolejliler	7.0	
2013–14	(Turkey) Barış Güney	Olin Edirne	7.1	
2014–15	(North Macedonia) Marques Green	TED Ankara Kolejliler	8.9	
2015–16	(France) Thomas Heurtel	Anadolu Efes	5.7	
2016–17	(North Macedonia) Jordan Theodore	Banvit	7.2	
2017–18	(Lithuania) Šarūnas Vasiliauskas	Trabzonspor	6.3	
2018–19	(Serbia) Vasilije Micić	Anadolu Efes	6.6	
2019–20	(United States) Trae Golden	Bahçeşehir Basketbol	7.8	
2020–21	(United States) Chris Wright	HDI Sigorta Afyon Belediye	8.3	
2021–22	(Slovenia) Luka Rupnik	Semt77 Yalovaspor	8.1	
2022–23	(Mexico) Alex Pérez	Konyaspor	7.5	
2023–24	(United States) Nate Mason	Yukatel Merkezefendi	7.1	
2024–25	(Mexico) Alex Pérez (×2)	Tofaş	6.4	
2025–26	(Netherlands) Keye van der Vuurst	ONVO Büyükçekmece	8.7	

== See also ==
- BSL Most Valuable Player Award
- Basketbol Süper Ligi Finals MVP
