= 2013–14 Turkish Basketball League =

Basketball league in Turkey

Turkish Basketball League
- Games played: 30
- Teams: 16
- TV partner: Lig TV

Regular season
- Top seed: Banvit
- Relegated: Aliağa Petkim; Mersin BB

Finals
- Champions: Fenerbahçe Ülker; 6th title
- Runners-up: Galatasaray Liv Hospital
- Semifinalists: Banvit; Pınar Karşıyaka

Statistical leaders
Points	(North Macedonia) Darius Washington	23.5
Rebounds	(United States) Elijah Holman	9.4
Assists	(Turkey) Barış Güney	7.1

The 2013–14 Turkish Basketball League, officially named the Beko Basketball League for sponsorship reasons, was the 48th season of the top professional basketball league in Turkey.

Fenerbahçe Ülker took the title, winning their 6th title. Galatasaray Liv Hospital were runners-up.

== Clubs and arenas ==
Club	Location	Foun.Year	Arena	Capacity	Last Year	Head coach
Aliağa Petkim	İzmir	1963	Enka Sport Hall	2,500	11th(RS)	(Turkey) Aclan Kavasoğlu
Anadolu Efes	Istanbul	1976	Abdi İpekçi Arena	12,270	2nd(RS), SF(Play-off)	(Greece) Vangelis Angelou
Aykon TED Kolejliler	Ankara	1954	TOBB Sport Hall	2,000	7th(RS), QF(Play-off)	(Turkey) Ercüment Sunter
Banvit	Bandırma	1994	Kara Ali Acar Sport Hall	2,500	3rd(RS), RU(Play-off)	(Greece) Dimitris Itoudis
Beşiktaş İntegral Forex	Istanbul	1933	BJK Akatlar Arena	3,200	6th(RS), QF(Play-off)	(Turkey) Ahmet Kandemir
Fenerbahçe Ülker	Istanbul	1913	Ülker Sports Arena	13,800	4th(RS), QF(Play-off)	(Serbia) Željko Obradović
Galatasaray Liv Hospital	Istanbul	1911	Abdi İpekçi Arena	12,270	1st(RS), Winner(Play-off)	(Turkey) Ergin Ataman
Mersin BB	Mersin	1993	Servet Tazegül Arena	7,500	12th(RS)	(Turkey) Mete Babaoğlu
Olin Edirne	Edirne	2006	Mimar Sinan Sport Hall	2,100	14th(RS)	(Turkey) Cem Akdağ
Pınar Karşıyaka	İzmir	1966	Karşıyaka Arena	5,000	5th(RS), SF(Play-off)	(Turkey) Ufuk Sarıca
Royal Halı Gaziantep	Gaziantep	2007	Karataş Şahinbey Sport Hall	6,400	9th(RS)	(Slovenia) Jure Zdovc
Selçuk Üniversitesi	Konya	1987	Selçuk Üniversitesi Sport Hall	3,500	2nd(RS) (TB2L)	(Turkey) Aziz Bekir
Tofaş	Bursa	1974	Bursa Atatürk Sport Hall	2,900	8th(RS), QF(Play-off)	(Turkey) Ahmet Çakı
Trabzonspor Medical Park	Trabzon	2008	Hayri Gür Arena	7,500	Winner (TB2L)	(Turkey) Hakan Demir
Türk Telekom	Ankara	1980	Ankara Arena	10,400	13th(RS)	(Turkey) Ertuğrul Erdoğan
Uşak Sportif	Uşak	2006	Uşak Atatürk Sport Hall	2,000	2nd (TB2L)	(Turkey) Ozan Bulkaz

Locations of the 2012–13 Turkish Basketball League Clubs

== Regular season ==
=== League table ===
Pos	Team	Pld	W	L	PF	PA	PD	Pts	Qualification or relegation
1	Banvit	30	28	2	2472	2100	+372	58	Qualification to playoffs
2	Fenerbahçe Ülker	30	24	6	2476	2096	+380	54	Qualification to playoffs
3	Anadolu Efes	30	22	8	2296	2132	+164	52	Qualification to playoffs
4	Galatasaray Liv Hospital	30	20	10	2372	2195	+177	50	Qualification to playoffs
5	Beşiktaş İntegral Forex	30	19	11	2359	2192	+167	49	Qualification to playoffs
6	Pınar Karşıyaka	30	17	13	2397	2282	+115	47	Qualification to playoffs
7	Uşak Sportif	30	16	14	2312	2335	−23	46	Qualification to playoffs
8	Tofaş	30	16	14	2423	2386	+37	46	Qualification to playoffs
9	Trabzonspor Medical Park	30	13	17	2415	2369	+46	43	
10	Royal Halı Gaziantep	30	13	17	2268	2216	+52	43	
11	Türk Telekom	30	12	18	2247	2292	−45	42	
12	Aykon TED Kolejliler	30	12	18	2294	2392	−98	42	
13	Torku Selçuk Üniversitesi	30	10	20	2276	2481	−205	40	
14	Olin Edirne	30	8	22	2350	2768	−418	38	
15	Mersin BB (R)	30	7	23	2252	2496	−244	37	Relegation to TBL
16	Aliağa Petkim (R)	30	3	27	2107	2584	−477	33	Relegation to TBL

Source: TBL
(R) Relegated

=== Results ===
	APE	AEF	TED	BAN	BJK	FBÜ	GSL	MBB	OLE	KSK	RHG	SEÜ	TOF	TTS	TSB	UŞK
Aliağa Petkim		71–85	76–78	64–76	50–91	65–81	77–69	74–82	102–91	75–94	61–95	82–73	73–91	65–75	84–92	68–70
Anadolu Efes	77–57		93–75	70–76	64–57	64–73	67–85	77–71	95–79	73–68	71–62	79–72	74–67	82–77	91–79	79–71
Aykon TED Kolejliler	72–69	62–74		79–99	68–75	64–81	78–83	85–70	82–74	99–64	70–75	89–87	88–93	79–69	91–80	68–74
Banvit	94–52	73–72	95–71		80–72	91–76	83–72	94–63	101–58	85–74	87–82	100–78	86–70	70–59	94–78	68–61
Beşiktaş İntegral Forex	91–53	71–57	74–78	73–60		69–77	82–78	85–78	87–68	69–68	94–91	81–67	79–85	67–71	87–69	85–80
Fenerbahçe Ülker	89–56	84–65	85–79	78–79	90–76		77–52	87–63	101–69	66–76	81–66	97–80	70–59	84–63	84–62	97–67
Galatasaray Liv Hospital	94–80	67–78	85–73	68–79	87–82	72–62		85–60	93–78	70–72	79–69	79–56	87–80	89–65	87–81	73–70
Mersin BB	84–79	76–81	80–84	75–77	77–87	75–100	88–100		77–78	74–72	58–88	76–72	83–89	88–72	97–87	73–78
Olin Edirne	98–79	65–99	68–92	64–89	79–86	82–111	77–98	88–86		73–96	78–95	87–93	82–78	65–101	73–96	77–85
Pınar Karşıyaka	89–65	76–80	76–53	81–75	84–77	83–74	58–71	96–63	93–85		70–64	91–88	86–67	90–80	64–72	93–72
Royal Halı Gaziantep	72–64	59–67	65–82	58–60	68–73	76–78	69–65	68–59	83–88	95–92		73–74	85–68	80–66	68–73	92–71
Selçuk Üniversitesi	83–76	76–72	98–75	70–79	58–61	55–80	69–91	83–79	76–88	84–98	89–77		70–67	89–83	84–77	61–98
Tofaş	117–82	78–84	89–84	60–84	76–74	89–81	67–60	72–79	126–67	71–69	93–76	89–87		83–80	83–80	81–87
Türk Telekom	96–80	69–75	84–66	73–81	67–84	63–69	70–64	79–74	72–80	96–74	85–83	67–53	79–83		72–82	64–76
Trabzonspor Medical Park	96–64	63–83	78–65	85–86	79–87	68–76	69–75	98–73	88–93	84–73	56–60	99–73	95–81	71–73		100–83
Uşak Sportif	89–64	73–68	79–65	64–71	85–83	68–87	79–94	81–71	108–98	82–77	64–74	91–78	75–71	66–77	65–78	

Source: TBL Fixtures

== Playoffs ==
Quarterfinals
1	Banvit	2
8	Tofaş	0
4	Galatasaray Liv Hospital	2
5	Beşiktaş İntegral Forex	1
2	Fenerbahçe Ülker	2
7	Uşak Sportif	0
3	Anadolu Efes	1
6	Pınar Karşıyaka	2

Semifinals
1	Banvit	1
4	Galatasaray Liv Hospital	3
2	Fenerbahçe Ülker	3
6	Pınar Karşıyaka	0

Finals
4	Galatasaray Liv Hospital	3
2	Fenerbahçe Ülker	4

== Individual statistics ==
=== Points ===
Rank	Name	Team	Pts	G	PPG
1.	(North Macedonia) Darius Washington, Jr.	Olin Edirne	681	29	23.5
2.	(United States) Troy Gillenwater	Torku Selçuk Üniversitesi	447	26	17.2
3.	(United States) Troy DeVries	Torku Selçuk Üniversitesi	399	24	16.6
4.	(Uruguay) Esteban Batista	Pınar Karşıyaka	555	35	15.9
5.	(United States) Chris Lofton	Beşiktaş	503	32	15.7
5.	(Turkey) Ali Karadeniz	Mersin BB	471	30	15.7

=== Rebounds ===
Rank	Name	Team	Rbs	G	RPG
1.	(United States) Elijah Holman	Uşak Sportif	281	30	9.4
2.	(Uruguay) Esteban Batista	Pınar Karşıyaka	312	35	8.9
3.	(Nigeria) Chinemelu Elonu	Tofaş	263	31	8.5
4.	(Montenegro) Vladimir Golubović	Aykon TED Kolejliler	225	29	7.8
5.	(United States) Sean Williams	Torku Selçuk Üniversitesi	232	30	7.7
5.	(North Macedonia) Predrag Samardžiski	Mersin BB	208	27	7.7

=== Assists ===
Rank	Name	Team	Ast	G	APG
1.	(Turkey) Barış Güney	Olin Edirne	214	30	7.1
2.	(Turkey) Kerem Tunçeri	Türk Telekom	161	27	6.0
3.	(Turkey) Barış Ermiş	Royal Halı Gaziantep	111	20	5.6
4.	(Turkey) Hakan Köseoğlu	Torku Selçuk Üniversitesi	90	17	5.3
5.	(Turkey) Evren Büker	Tofaş	157	30	5.2

=== Blocks ===
Rank	Name	Team	Blk	G	BPG
1.	(United States) Sean Williams	Torku Selçuk Üniversitesi	93	30	3.1
2.	(United States) Justin Carter	Uşak Sportif	39	30	1.3
3.	(United States) Elijah Holman	Uşak Sportif	341	30	1.1
3.	(Nigeria) Chinemelu Elonu	Tofaş	35	31	1.1
3.	(United States) Charles Davis	Banvit	38	34	1.1

=== Steals ===
Rank	Name	Team	Stl	G	SPG
1.	(North Macedonia) Darius Washington, Jr.	Olin Edirne	54	29	1.9
2.	(United States) Jamon Gordon	Anadolu Efes	54	32	1.7
3.	(United States) Justin Carter	Uşak Sportif	49	30	1.6
4.	(Bulgaria) E. J. Rowland	Banvit Bandırma	51	34	1.5
5.	(Turkey) Bobby Dixon	Pınar Karşıyaka	147	35	1.3
5.	(United States) Sean Williams	Torku Selçuk Üniversitesi	40	30	1.3
5.	(United States) Chris Lofton	Beşiktaş	42	32	1.3
5.	(North Macedonia) Bo McCalebb	Fenerbahçe Ülker	52	40	1.3
5.	(United States) Marcus Denmon	Tofaş	40	31	1.3
5.	(Turkey) Muratcan Güler	Beşiktaş	38	30	1.3

|} Source: TBL Stats
