= Hakan Yavuz =

Turkish professional basketball coach (born 1960)

Denizli Basket
- Position: Head coach

Personal information
- Born: June 1, 1960 (age 66) Istanbul, Turkey
- Coaching career: 1982–present

Career history

Coaching
- 1982–1989: Efes Pilsen (assistant)
- 1989–1991: Galatasaray (assistant)
- 1991–1992: Galatasaray
- 1992–1994: Beşiktaş
- 1994–1996: Antalyaspor
- 1996–1997: Galatasaray
- 1997–1998: Meysu
- 1998–1999: Muratpaşa Belediye
- 2001–2003: Banvit
- 2004–2005: TTNet Beykoz
- 2005–2007: Selçuk Üniversitesi
- 2008–2009: TTNet Beykoz
- 2009–2010: TED Ankara Kolejliler
- 2011–2012: Vestel
- 2012–2014: İstanbul BB
- 2014–2015: Best Balıkesir
- 2015–?: Denizli Basket
- 2024–?: Yalovaspor Basketbol

Career highlights
- 2x Turkish Second Basketball League champion

Hakan Yavuz (born 1 June 1960 in Istanbul, Turkey) is a Turkish professional basketball coach, who was signed by Denizli Basket in 2015 and by Yalovaspor Basketbol in 2024.
