= Örge =

Örge (Turkish pronunciation: [œɾ̞ˈɟɛ]) is a Turkish surname that may refer to the following notable people:

- Gizem Örge (born 1993), Turkish volleyball player
- Teoman Örge (born 1990), Turkish basketball player
