= Erdem Türetken =

Turkish basketball player

Ankara DSİ
- Position: Small forward
- League: Turkish Basketball Second League

Personal information
- Born: April 5, 1979 (age 47) Amasya, Turkey
- Listed height: 6 ft 6 in (1.98 m)
- Listed weight: 227 lb (103 kg)

Career information
- Playing career: 2001–present

Career history
- 2001–2002: Marmara Koleji
- 2002–2005: Darüşşafaka
- 2005–2006: Beşiktaş Cola Turka
- 2006–2007: Darüşşafaka
- 2007–2009: Galatasaray Café Crown
- 2009–2010: Kepez Belediyespor
- 2010–2011: Aliağa Petkim
- 2011–2012: Torku Selçuk Üniversitesi
- 2012–2013: Trabzonspor
- 2013–present: Ankara DSİ

Erdem Türetken (born 5 April 1979) is a Turkish professional basketball player. He currently plays for Trabzonspor.

He studied at Anadolu University.
