= Fatih Solak =

Turkish professional basketball player (born 1980)

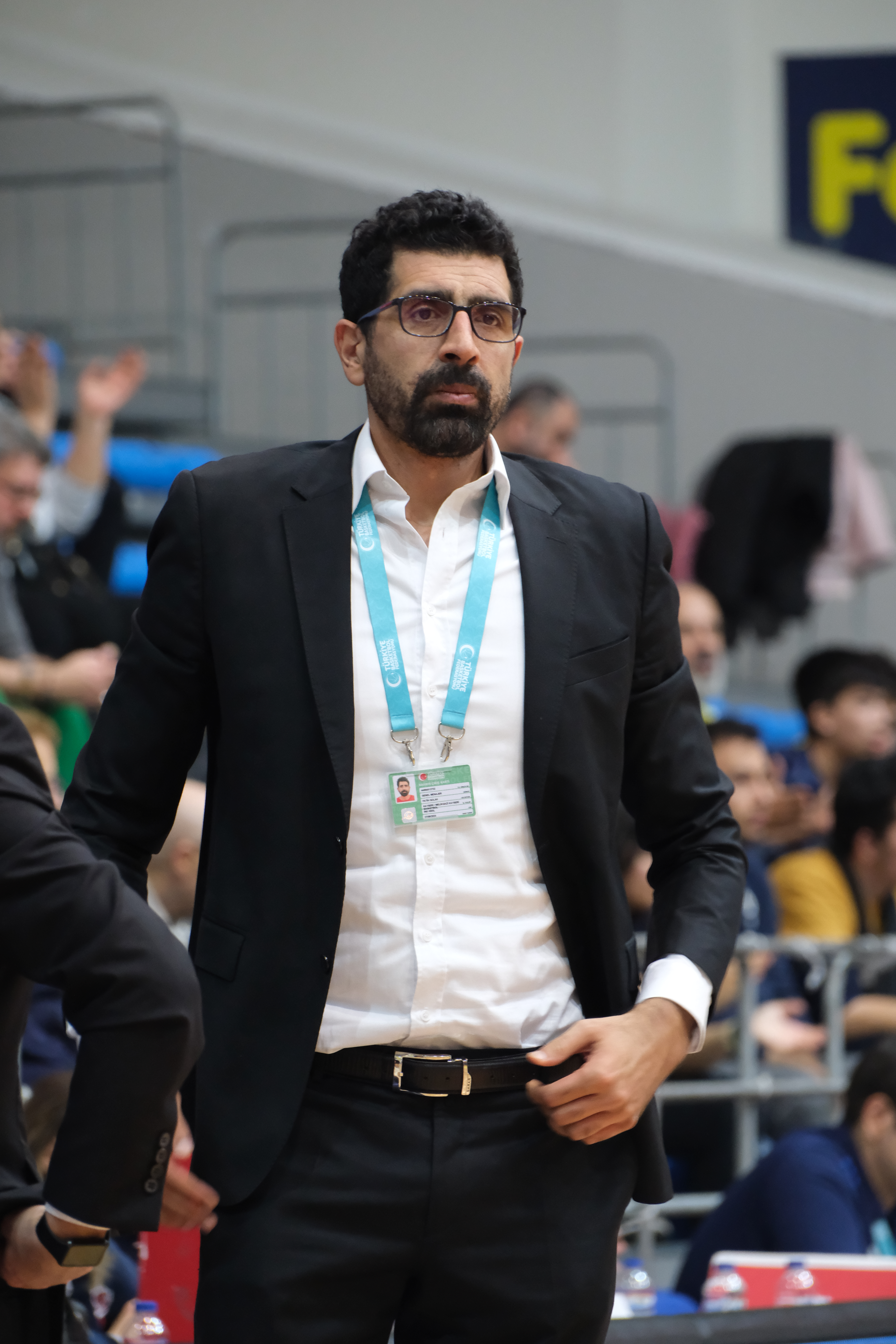
- Solak in 2025

Personal information
- Born: July 25, 1980 (age 46) Kayseri, Turkey
- Listed height: 7 ft 0 in (2.13 m)
- Listed weight: 275 lb (125 kg)

Career information
- Playing career: 2001–2015
- Position: Center

Career history
- 2001–2002: Beşiktaş Cola Turka
- 2002–2005: Ülkerspor
- 2005–2008: Galatasaray Café Crown
- 2008–2009: Aliağa Petkim
- 2009: Kepez Belediyespor
- 2009–2010: Galatasaray Café Crown
- 2010–2011: Türk Telekom
- 2011–2012: Olin Edirne
- 2013–2014: Torku Selçuk Üniversitesi
- 2015: Mersin BB
Medals
Men's basketball
Representing Turkey
Mediterranean Games
Bronze medal – third place	2009 Pescara	Team

Fatih Solak (born July 25, 1980) is a Turkish professional basketball player. He stands 2.13 m tall, making him a Center. He also has an impressive physique and weighs 125 kilograms (276 lb).

== Pro career ==
In the past, he has also played for Ülkerspor and Beşiktaş Istanbul in the Turkish league.

Solak has always identified his ambition as playing in the NBA, in which other Turkish National players Mehmet Okur, Ersan İlyasova and Hidayet Türkoğlu are currently playing. Fatih Solak only started playing basketball at the age of seventeen, when he had a height of 6.3 feet (1.9 metres). Ever since his first year in basketball, Fatih Solak has developed vastly and has become an established figure for the Turkish National team. Due to his success in blocking, rebounds and 2.08 figure, Solak has been likened to Houston Rockets legend Dikembe Mutombo. Fatih is proud of being likened to one of his NBA idols and aims to continue producing the performances that have made him this popular with Turkish fans. Solak's average stats for the 2006–2007 season are as follows: 7.75 points, 6.5 rebounds, and 4.1 blocks per game; which is deemed successful by his coach at Galatasaray Cafe Crown Murat Özyer.

Fatih Solak has always thanked former coach Selcuk Ernak who is believed to have helped in Fatih's development as one of Turkey's top centres. Selçuk Ernak is the current coach at Banvitspor. Murat Özyer, his coach at Galatasaray Café Crown, has also received a mention from Fatih for consistently giving him enough minutes on the field. In June 2008, Fatih Solak transferred to Aliağa Petkim.

For the 2010–11 season he signed with Türk Telekom B.K.

== Turkish national team ==
Fatih Solak was part of the Turkish national team that achieved sixth place in the 2006 FIBA World Championship in Japan. He is best known for his amazing blocks and rebounds, and he also contributes to the attack. Fatih Solak has recently become known for his close friendship with fellow National Team Player Ermal Kurtoğlu.

In September 2008, Solak represented Turkey in the Division A EuroBasket Qualification tournament. Turkey won all her 6 games, against France, Belgium and Ukraine. Fatih Solak impressed especially in the last game of the group matches against France. Turkey won in France 80 to 78 and Fatih Solak recorded in this game 16 points, 6 rebounds and 4 blocks.
