= Altay Özurgancı =

Turkish basketball player (born 1988)

Torku Konyaspor Basket
- Position: Small forward
- League: Turkish Basketball Super League

Personal information
- Born: May 11, 1988 (age 38) Istanbul, TURKEY
- Listed height: 6 ft 6 in (1.98 m)
- Listed weight: 210 lb (95 kg)

Career information
- Playing career: 2005–present

Career history
- 2005–2009: Galatasaray Café Crown
- 2009–2011: Kepez Belediyesi S.K.
- 2011-2013: ITÜ
- 2013-2014: İstanbulspor A.Ş.
- 2014-2015: Defendants / AUSTRALIA
- 2015–2016: Torku Konyaspor Basket

Altay Özurgancı (born 11 May 1988) is a Turkish professional basketball player. After a small break in his career he went to Australia where he was studying business and in the same time keeping his professional career. He got married in 2017 and rumors say that he is living in France...
