= Ayberk Olmaz =

Turkish basketball player (born 1996)

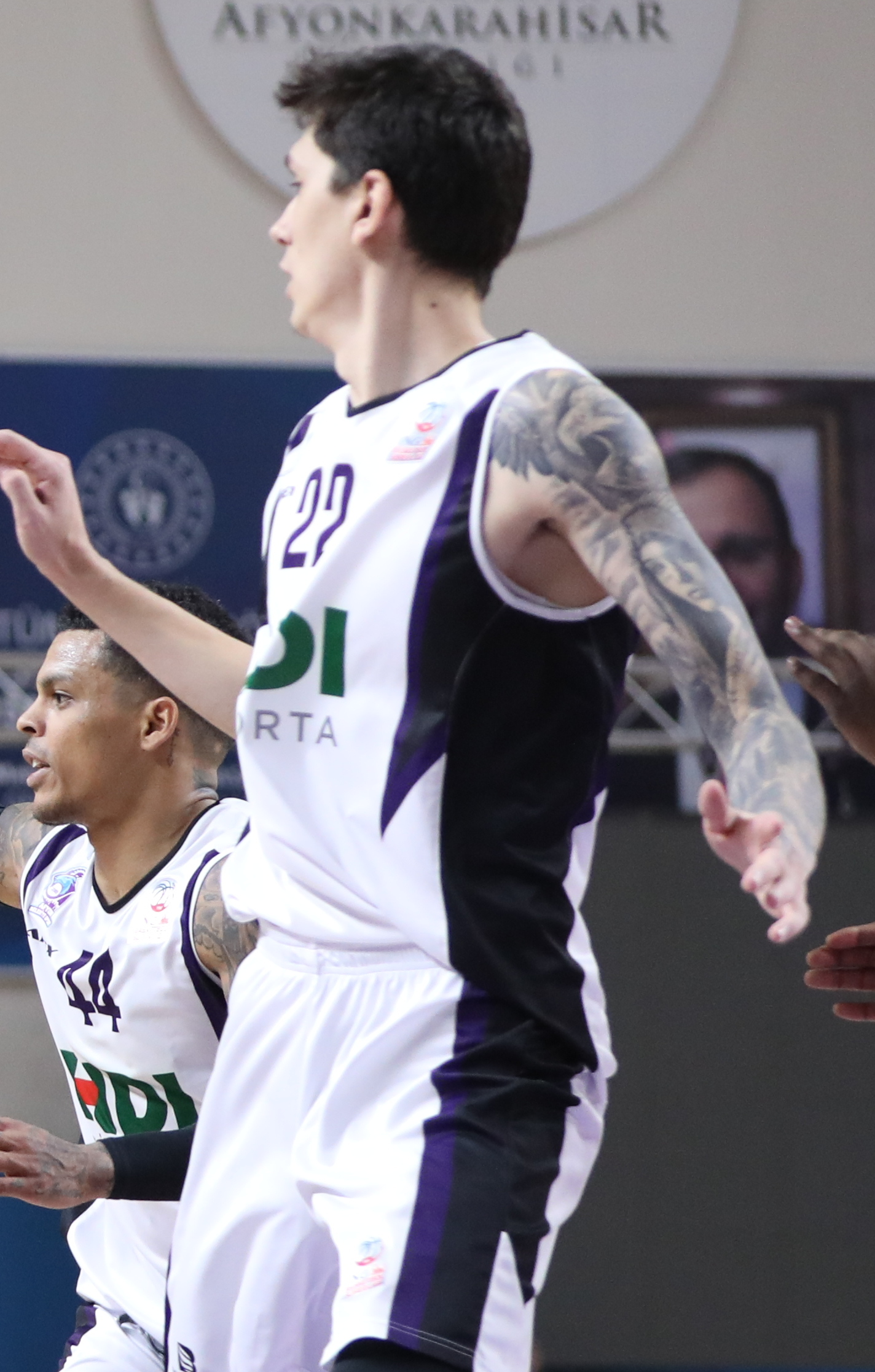

No. 22 – İlab Basketbol
- Position: Power forward / center
- League: TBL

Personal information
- Born: 8 June 1996 (age 30) Edirne, Turkey
- Listed height: 6 ft 10.75 in (2.10 m)
- Listed weight: 205 lb (93 kg)

Career information
- Playing career: 2013–present

Career history
- 2013–2016: Fenerbahçe Ülker
- 2014–2016: →TED Ankara Kolejliler
- 2016–2018: İstanbul BB
- 2018–2021: Galatasaray
- 2021: Afyon Belediye
- 2021–present: Frutti Extra Bursaspor
- 2022–2023: Merkezefendi Bld. Denizli Basket
- 2023–2024: Manisa BB
- 2024–2025: Merkezefendi Bld. Denizli Basket
- 2025–present: İlab Basketbol
Medals
Men's basketball
Representing Turkey
U-19 World Cup
| Bronze medal – third place | 2015 Greece | U-19 Team |
FIBA Europe Under-18 Championship
| Gold medal – first place | 2014 Turkey | U-18 team |

Ayberk Olmaz (born 8 June 1996) is a Turkish professional basketball player for İlab Basketbol of the Türkiye Basketbol Ligi (TBL). Standing at 2.10 m (6 ft 10 1/2 in), he plays at the power forward and center positions.

== Professional career ==
In 2013, Olmaz signed a contract with Fenerbahçe Ülker. On 5 October 2013, in pre-season game against the Oklahoma City Thunder he had 1 assist, 3 rebounds performance in 6 minutes.

Before the beginning of the 2014–2015 season, he was loaned to TED Ankara Kolejliler for 3 years.

On 26 July 2018 he signed with Galatasaray of the Turkish Basketbol Süper Ligi (BSL).

On 2 August 2021 he signed with Afyon Belediye of the Turkish Basketbol Süper Ligi (BSL).

On 9 December 2021 he signed with Frutti Extra Bursaspor of Basketball Super League (BSL).

On 1 August 2022 he signed with Merkezefendi Bld. Denizli Basket of the Turkish Basketball Super League (BSL).

On 30 June 2023 he signed with Manisa BB of the Turkish Basketbol Süper Ligi.

On June 1, 2024, he signed with Merkezefendi Bld. Denizli Basket of the Basketbol Süper Ligi (BSL).

On August 25, 2025, he signed with İlab Basketbol of the Türkiye Basketbol Ligi (TBL).
