= Murat Kaya =

Turkish basketball player (born 1984)

Pizza Bulls Bordo Bandırma
- Title: Assistant coach
- League: BSL

Personal information
- Born: June 13, 1984 (age 42) Ankara, Turkey
- Listed height: 6 ft 4 in (1.93 m)
- Listed weight: 196 lb (89 kg)

Career information
- Playing career: 2000–2020
- Position: Shooting guard
- Number: 10

Career history

Playing
- 2000–2006: Büyük Kolej
- 2006–2010: Galatasaray Café Crown
- 2010–2011: Bornova Belediye
- 2011–2012: Hacettepe Üniversitesi
- 2012–2013: TED Ankara Kolejliler
- 2013–2014: Türk Telekom
- 2014–2015: Mamak Belediyesi Ankara DSİ Era
- 2015–2016: Sakarya BB
- 2016–2017: Petkim Spor
- 2017–2018: Mamak Belediyesi Ankara DSİ
- 2019–2020: Anadolu Basket

Coaching
- 2020–2021: TED Ankara Kolejliler
- 2021–2023: Gaziantep Basketbol
- 2023–2025: Petkim Spor (assistant)
- 2025–present: Bandırma Bordo Basketbol (assistant)

Murat Kaya (born June 13, 1984) is a Turkish professional basketball coach and former player who played at the shooting guard position.
