= Hakan Köseoğlu =

Turkish basketball player (born 1981)

Personal information
- Born: December 12, 1981 (age 44) Istanbul, Turkey
- Listed height: 6 ft 2 in (1.88 m)
- Listed weight: 175 lb (79 kg)

Career information
- Playing career: 1998–2015
- Position: Point guard

Career history
- 1998–2002: Darüşşafaka
- 2002–2003: Pınar Karşıyaka
- 2003–2006: Tuborg Pilsener
- 2006–2007: Tofaş
- 2007–2008: Kepez Belediye
- 2008–2009: Pınar Karşıyaka
- 2009–2010: Erdemir
- 2010–2011: Mersin BB
- 2011–2012: Aliağa Petkim
- 2012–2013: Mersin BB
- 2013–2014: Torku Selçuk Üniversitesi
- 2014–2015: Aliağa Petkim

Career highlights
- 3× Turkish League assists leader (2008–2010)

Hakan Köseoğlu (born December 12, 1981) is a Turkish former professional basketball player. He played the point guard position.
