= Ege Arar =

Turkish basketball player (born 1996)

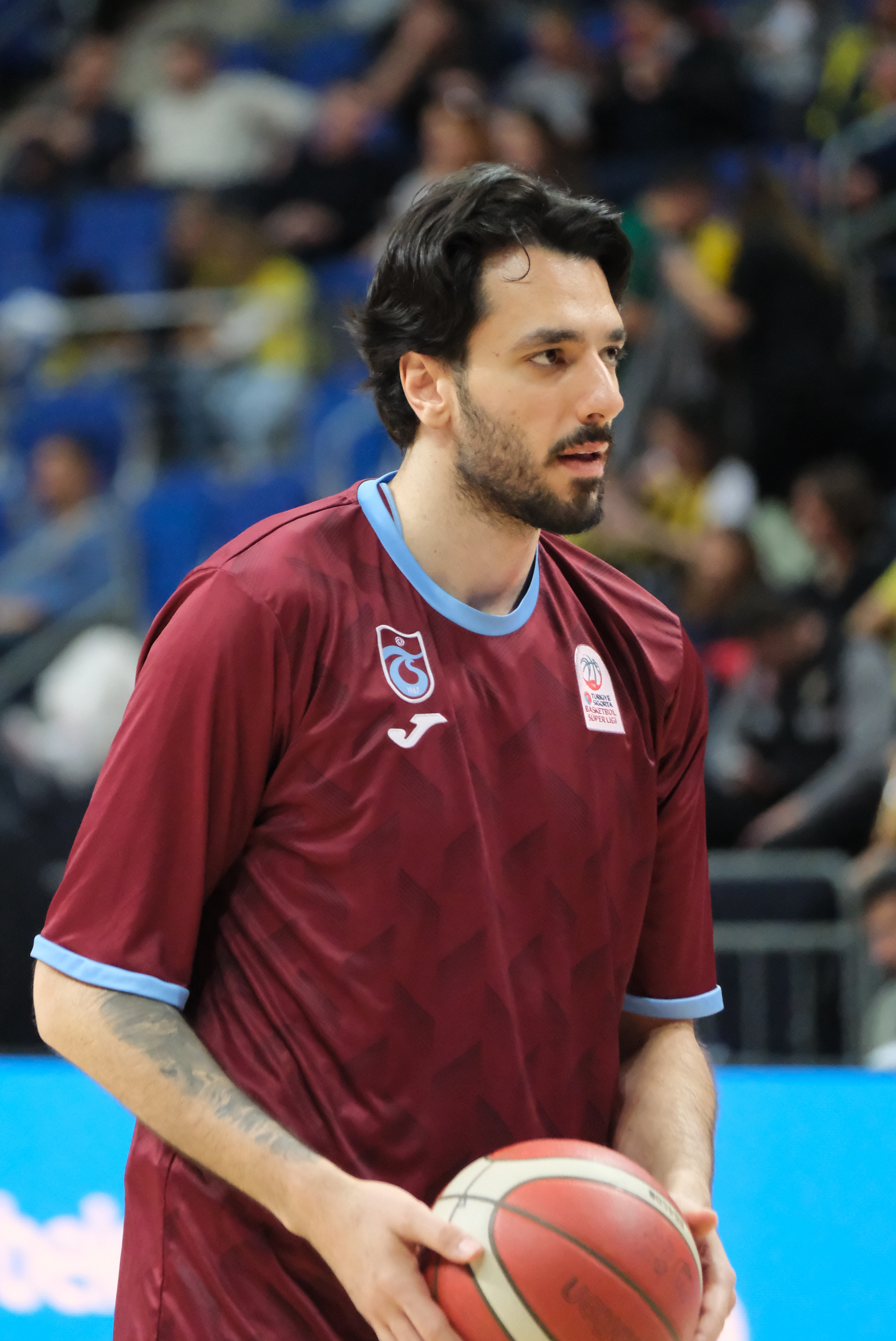
- Arar with Trabzonspor in 2026

No. 19 – Trabzonspor
- Position: Center / power forward
- League: Türkiye Basketbol Ligi

Personal information
- Born: 2 September 1996 (age 30) Seyhan, Adana, Turkey
- Listed height: 6 ft 10 in (2.08 m)
- Listed weight: 230 lb (104 kg)

Career information
- Playing career: 2014–present

Career history
- 2014–2020: Galatasaray
- 2016: →Pertevniyal
- 2020–2021: Petkim Spor
- 2021–2022: Galatasaray Nef
- 2022–2023: Petkim Spor
- 2023: Çağdaş Bodrumspor
- 2023–2024: Manisa Büyükşehir Belediyespor
- 2024: Darüşşafaka
- 2024–present: Trabzonspor

Career highlights
- Türkiye Basketbol Ligi champion (2025); EuroCup champion (2016)

Ege Arar (born 2 September 1996) is a Turkish professional basketball player for Trabzonspor of the Türkiye Basketbol Ligi (TBL).

== Early years ==
In 2010, Ege was selected to play for the Galatasaray Academy, after a try-out against 37 other competing players in his age group. Ege was selected to the Turkish junior national Under-16 team, and he played at the 2012 FIBA Europe Under-16 Championship, where he won a gold medal.

In 2014, after leading Galatasaray's Under-18 junior team in the Istanbul youth league to a third place finish, and Galatasaray's Under-20 junior team to the final of the Turkish Developmental League (Geliştirme Ligi), he was selected to the Turkish national under-18 team.

He started in all of Turkey's games at the 2014 FIBA Europe Under-18 Championship, and won the gold medal at the tournament. Shortly after that, he was moved up to the senior men's club team of Galatasaray. He was initially given the jersey number 34, which was previously used by another former Galatasaray academy player, Doğukan Sönmez.

== Professional career ==
Arar began his pro career during the 2014–15 season with the Turkish Super League club Galatasaray. With Galatasaray, he won the European-wide 2nd-tier level EuroCup championship during the 2015–16 season.

On 12 July 2020, he signed with newly promoted Petkim Spor of the Basketbol Süper Ligi.

On 10 August 2021, he has signed with and returned to Galatasaray of the Turkish BSL after one year break.

On 10 June 2022, he signed with and returned to Petkim Spor for a second stint.

On 7 July 2023, he signed with Çağdaş Bodrumspor of the Basketbol Süper Ligi.

On 6 November 2023, he signed with Manisa Büyükşehir Belediyespor of the Turkish Basketbol Süper Ligi (BSL).

On 16 August 2024, he signed with Darüşşafaka of the Basketbol Süper Ligi (BSL).

On 18 October 2024, he signed with Trabzonspor of the Türkiye Basketbol Ligi (TBL).

== Turkish national team ==
Arar was a member of the junior national teams of Turkey. With Turkey's junior national teams, he played at the following tournaments: the 2012 FIBA Europe Under-16 Championship, where he won a gold medal, the 2014 FIBA Europe Under-18 Championship, where he won a gold medal, the 2015 FIBA Under-19 World Championship, where he won a bronze medal, the 2015 FIBA Europe Under-20 Championship, where he won a bronze medal, and the 2016 FIBA Europe Under-20 Championship, where he won a bronze medal.
