= Sherron Mills =

American basketball player (1971–2016)

Personal information
- Born: July 29, 1971 Salisbury, Maryland, U.S.
- Died: January 17, 2016 (aged 44) Baltimore, Maryland, U.S.
- Listed height: 6 ft 8 in (2.03 m)
- Listed weight: 220 lb (100 kg)

Career information
- High school: Snow Hill (Snow Hill, Maryland)
- College: Chowan (1989–1990); VCU (1990–1993)
- NBA draft: 1993: 2nd round, 29th overall pick
- Drafted by: Minnesota Timberwolves
- Playing career: 1993–2000
- Position: Power forward

Career history
- 1993–1995: BCM Gravelines
- 1995–1996: Cx Orologi Siena
- 1996–1997: Galatasaray
- 1998–1999: TDK Manresa
- 1999–2000: Tau Cerámica
- Stats at Basketball Reference

Sherron Mills (July 29, 1971 – January 17, 2016) was an American basketball player from Salisbury, Maryland. A 6'9" forward, he played for Snow Hill High School, leading the team to the 1989 Maryland 1-A Boys Basketball State Championship.

He played college ball for Virginia Commonwealth University. He was drafted 29th overall in the 1993 NBA draft by the Minnesota Timberwolves. He did not make an NBA roster, but played professionally in Europe.

Playing in the Italian Serie A for Cx Orologi Siena during the 1995–96, he topped the league in rebounding.

Mills died at a hospital in Baltimore, Maryland from complications of amyotrophic lateral sclerosis (ALS) on January 17, 2016, at the age of 44.
