= Şuacan Pişkin =

Turkish basketball player (born 1990)

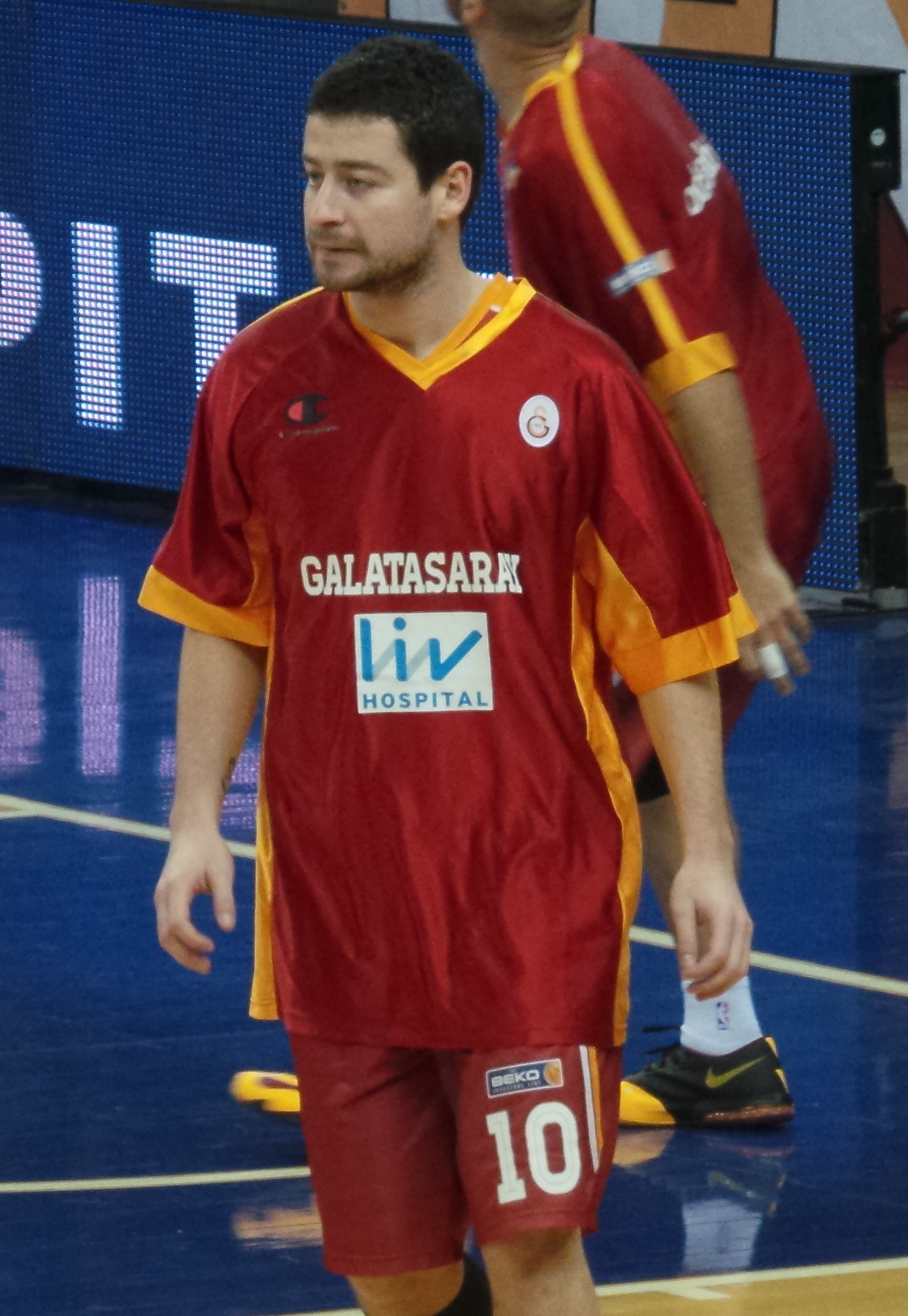
- Şuacan Pişkin in 2014

Galatasaray Liv Hospital
- Position: Point guard / shooting guard

Personal information
- Born: August 4, 1990 (age 36) Istanbul, Turkey
- Listed height: 6 ft 2 in (1.88 m)
- Listed weight: 187 lb (85 kg)

Career information
- NBA draft: 2012: undrafted
- Playing career: 2009–present

Career history
- 2003–2011: İTÜ
- 2009–2010: →Yeşilyurt
- 2011–2012: Mersin BŞB
- 2012–2013: İstanbulspor
- 2013: Basketspor
- 2013–2014: Galatasaray Liv Hospital
- 2014–2015: Adanaspor
- 2015–: Galatasaray Liv Hospital

Şuacan Pişkin (born August 4, 1990) is a Turkish professional basketball player who plays for Galatasaray Liv Hospital.

== Professional career ==
=== Early years ===
Pişkin was born in Istanbul and started playing basketball for İTÜ in 2003. In 2006, he was started to play for first team when he was 16 years old. He played for 3 seasons, until he was loaned to Yeşilyurt for 2009–10 season. He returned to İTÜ for next season and transferred to Mersin BŞB in 2011. He returned to Istanbul, İstanbulspor. His wages did not paid for 8 months and he left the team. In 2013 he joined third division, TB3L team Basketspor.

=== Galatasaray ===
In the summer of 2013, he joined to Galatasaray Liv Hospital as a training player. However he stayed at the team for the 2013–14 season and become part of TBL finalist team. In the summer of 2014, it was announced that he will be with team for next season. However, he then signed with Adanaspor. In February 2015, Pişkin joined Galatasaray to replace the injured point guard Carlos Arroyo.
