= Jack Avina =

American basketball player and coach

Biographical details
- Born: January 30, 1929; Madera, California, U.S.
- Died: October 4, 2018 (aged 89); Lafayette, California, U.S.

Playing career
- 1950–1952: San Jose State

Coaching career (HC unless noted)
- 1959–1962: San Jose HS
- 1962–1970: College of San Mateo
- 1970–1987: Portland

Accomplishments and honors

Awards
- WCAC Coach of the Year (1978)

Jack Francis Avina (January 30, 1929 – October 4, 2018) was an American college basketball coach, known for his career at head coach at the NCAA Division I University of Portland where he served for 17 seasons.

Avina, a Mexican-American born in Madera, California, served in the United States Navy, then attended San Jose State University where he played basketball for two seasons. He first coached at the high school level in California, at Gridley High School and San Jose High School. He then moved to San Mateo Junior College (now the College of San Mateo) for eight seasons from 1962 to 1970, compiling a record of 140–80. He then moved to the major college ranks to Portland. Avina coached the Pilots from 1970 to 1987, compiling a record of 222–243. He coached several of the school's top players, including National Basketball Association (NBA) players Jose Slaughter and Darwin Cook. Avina retired in 1987 after a 14–14 campaign.

Following his time at Portland, he coached professionally in Brazil and Turkey.

Avina died on October 4, 2018, in Lafayette, California, at the age of 89.
