= Arda Vekiloğlu =

Personal information
- Born: 21 January 1979 (age 47) Turkey
- Listed height: 206 cm (6 ft 9 in)

Career information
- Playing career: 1995–2008
- Position: Small forward / power forward
- Coaching career: 2018–present

Career history

Playing
- 1995–1999: Karşıyaka
- 1999–2000: Efes Pilsen
- 2000–2001: Galatasaray
- 2001–2002: Efes Pilsen
- 2002–2003: Galatasaray
- 2003–2004: Ülkerspor
- 2004–2005: Galatasaray
- 2005–2006: Karşıyaka
- 2006–2007: Beşiktaş
- 2007–2008: Kepez Belediye

Coaching
- 2018–2019: Bursaspor
- 2019–2020: Petkim Spor

Arda Vekiloğlu (born 21 January 1979 in Turkey) is a Turkish professional basketball coach and former player. He was recently head coach for Petkim Spor of the TBL. He was a part of the Turkey national basketball team.

In August 2018, he signed to become the head coach of Bursaspor Basketbol.

On July 2, 2019, he has signed with Petkim Spor of the TBL.

== Career ==
Player:

- Pınar Karşıyaka (1995–1999, 2005–2006)
- Efes Pilsen (1999–2000, 2001–2002)
- Galatasaray Café Crown (2000–2001, 2002–2003, 2004–2005)
- Ülkerspor (2003–2004)
- Beşiktaş Cola Turka (2006–2007)
- Kepez Belediyesi (2007–2008)

Coach:

- Gelişim Koleji (Youth Team)
- Bursaspor (Head Coach)
- Petkim Spor (Head Coach)
- Balıkesir Büyükşehir Belediyespor (Head Coach)
