= Serkan Aydın =

Turkish basketball player

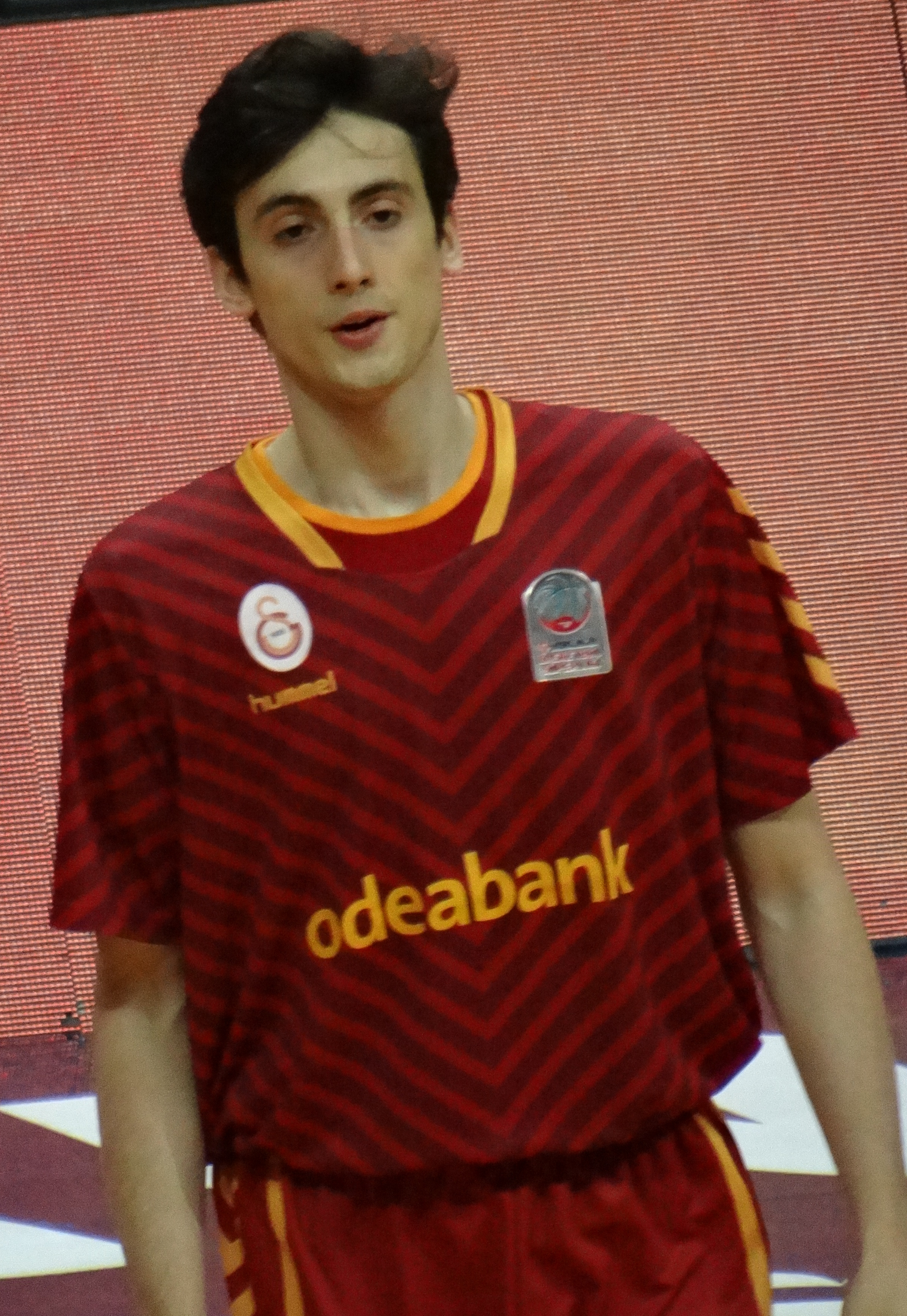

Free agent
- Position: Point guard

Personal information
- Born: May 20, 2000 (age 26) Istanbul, Turkey
- Listed height: 6 ft 7 in (2.01 m)
- Listed weight: 187 lb (85 kg)

Career information
- Playing career: 2017–present

Career history
- 2017–2020: Galatasaray

Serkan Aydın (born May 20, 2000) is a Turkish professional basketball player, who lastly played for Galatasaray of the Turkish Basketbol Süper Ligi (BSL) and the EuroCup.

== Career ==
Serkan Aydın started his career with Galatasaray academy in 2011, after successful tryouts.

On January 22, 2017, he made his BSL debut by playing 2 minutes against Büyükçekmece.
