= İstanbul Büyükşehir Belediyespor (basketball) =

İstanbul BB
- Leagues: Turkish Basketball Second League
- Founded: 2000; 26 years ago
- History: İstanbul Büyükşehir Belediyespor (2000–present)
- Arena: Cebeci Sport Hall
- Capacity: 1,250
- Location: Istanbul, Turkey
- Team colors: Navy blue, pink
- President: Ahmet Hamdi Çamlı
- Head coach: Vacant
- Website: istanbulbbsk.org
Home	Away

İstanbul Büyükşehir Belediyespor, also known simply as İstanbul BŞB or Istanbul BB, is a professional basketball club based in Istanbul, that plays in the Turkish Basketball Second League, the third tier of Turkey's basketball pyramid. Their home arena is Cebeci Sport Hall. The club is a part of İstanbul Büyükşehir Belediyesi Spor Kulübü.

== History ==
İstanbul BŞB basketball was founded in 2000, as a branch of İstanbul Büyükşehir Belediyesi Spor Kulübü. The team began playing in the lower divisions of Turkish basketball league systems for 2000 season with amateur players. The team became professional in 2006 and the team played in EBBL for 2006 to 2009. In 2009, the team promoted to TB2L from EBBL. The team played TB2L till 2013–14 season. In 2013–14 season, the team finished to seven of Regular Season. In Playoffs, the team faced to Ankara DSİ S.K. in quarter-finals and beat them 2-1. Then, the team beat Aydem Pamukkale Üniversitesi in semi-finals and promoted to TBL (now called BSL). 2014–15 season was first season of İstanbul BŞB in TBL and finished to twelve.

== Season by season ==
Season	Tier	League	Pos.	W–L	Turkish Cup	European competitions	
2008–09	3	TB3L					
2009–10	2	TB2L	10th				
2010–11	2	TB2L	9th				
2011–12	2	TB2L	12th				
2012–13	2	TB2L	11th				
2013–14	2	TB2L	2nd				
2014–15	1	TBL	12th	12–18			
2015–16	1	BSL	13th	10–20			
2016–17	1	BSL	10th	11–19			
2017–18	1	BSL	11th	11–19		4 FIBA Europe Cup	R2
2018–19	1	BSL	13th	6–22		4 FIBA Europe Cup	RS

== Players ==
=== Current roster ===
İstanbul BB roster
Players	Coaches
Pos. / No. / Nat. / Name / Ht. / Wt. / Age	Head coach: Vacant; Strength & conditioning coach(es): (Turkey) Özer Özeler; Team manager: (Turkey) Aycan Şarlı; Legend: (C) Team captain; (DC) Dual citizenship; Injured; Roster; Updated: September 17, 2019

=== Depth chart ===
Pos.	Starting 5	Bench
C
PF
SF
SG
PG

=== Notable players ===
Note: Flags indicate national team eligibility at FIBA-sanctioned events. Players may hold other non-FIBA nationalities not displayed.

Criteria

To appear in this section a player must have either:

- Set a club record or won an individual award while at the club
- Played at least one official international match for their national team at any time
- Played at least one official NBA match at any time.

- (Turkey) Bora Paçun
- (Turkey) Caner Topaloğlu
- (Turkey) Cüneyt Erden
- (Turkey) Metecan Birsen
- (Bosnia and Herzegovina) Zackary Wright
- (Croatia) Damir Markota
- (Lithuania) Steponas Babrauskas
- (Lithuania) Deividas Dulkys
- (Slovenia) Jure Balažič
- (Slovenia) Jaka Klobučar
- (United States) Alex Stepheson
- (United States) Eric Buckner
- (United States) Marque Perry
- (United States) Michael Jenkins
