= Caner Erdeniz =

Turkish basketball player (born 1987)

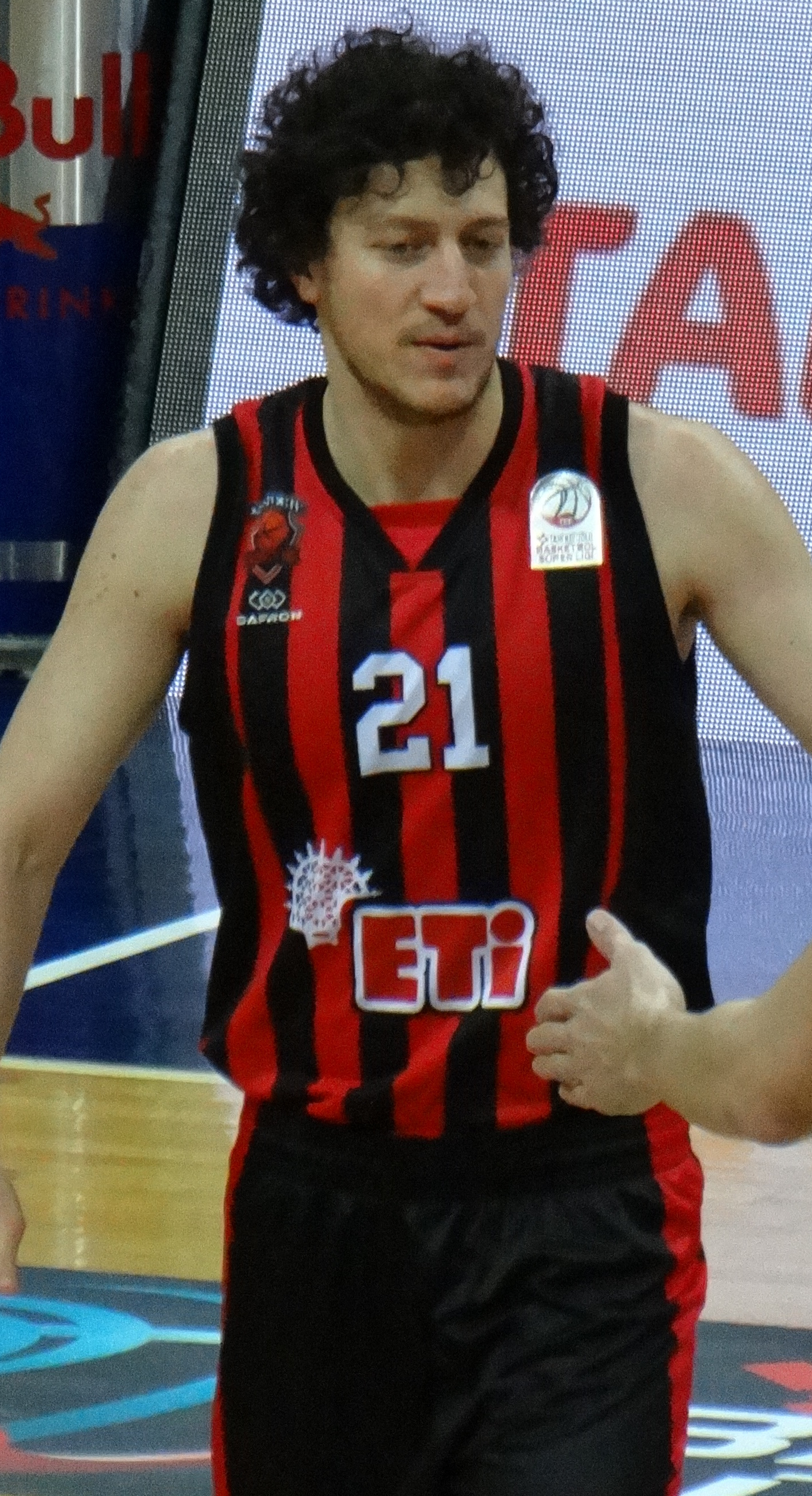

Free Agent
- Position: Small forward

Personal information
- Born: 25 April 1987 (age 39) İzmir, Turkey
- Listed height: 6 ft 7 in (2.01 m)

Career information
- Playing career: 2004–present

Career history
- 2003–2005: Pınar Karşıyaka
- 2005–2007: Gelişim Koleji
- 2007–2009: CASA TED Kolejliler
- 2009–2011: Hacettepe Üniversitesi
- 2011–2012: Maliye Milli Piyango
- 2012–2014: Aykon TED Kolejliler
- 2014–2015: Beşiktaş Integral Forex
- 2015–2016: TED Ankara Kolejliler
- 2016–2018: Eskişehir Basket
- 2018–2021: Galatasaray
- 2021–2022: Büyükçekmece Basketbol

Caner Erdeniz (born 25 April 1987) is a Turkish professional basketball player who last played for Büyükçekmece of the Turkish Basketball Super League (BSL). He is the son of former basketball player Mehmet Erdeniz.

On 23 June 2014 Erdeniz signed a contract with the Turkish team Beşiktaş. He is married to Turkish actress Müge Boz, with whom he has a daughter and a son.
