= Evren Büker =

Turkish basketball player (born 1985)

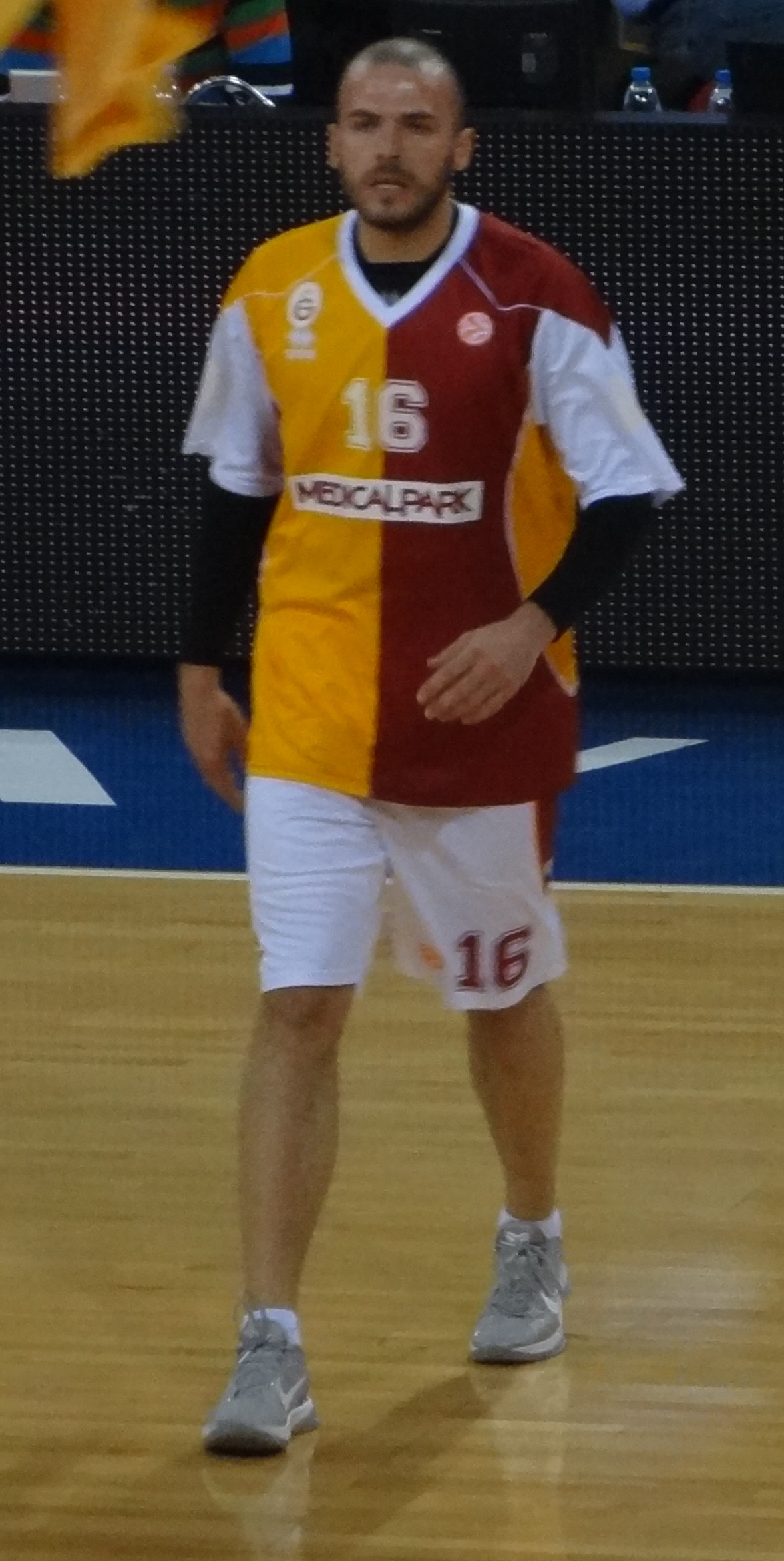
- Evren Büker

Free Agent
- Position: Small forward / shooting guard

Personal information
- Born: July 6, 1985 (age 41) Bursa, Turkey
- Listed height: 6 ft 4.5 in (1.94 m)
- Listed weight: 205 lb (93 kg)

Career information
- NBA draft: 2007: undrafted
- Playing career: 2006–present

Career history
- 2006–2009: Oyak Renault
- 2009–2012: Galatasaray
- 2012–2013: Pınar Karşıyaka
- 2013–2014: Tofaş
- 2014–2016: Türk Telekom
- 2016–2017: Eskişehir Basket
- 2017–2018: Bahçeşehir Koleji
- 2018–2020: Bursaspor

Evren Büker (born July 6, 1985) is a Turkish professional basketball player, who lastly played for Bursaspor of the Turkish Basketball Super League (BSL). He plays at the swingman position.
