= Tufan Ersöz =

Turkish basketball player (born 1980)

Mehmet Tufan Ersöz
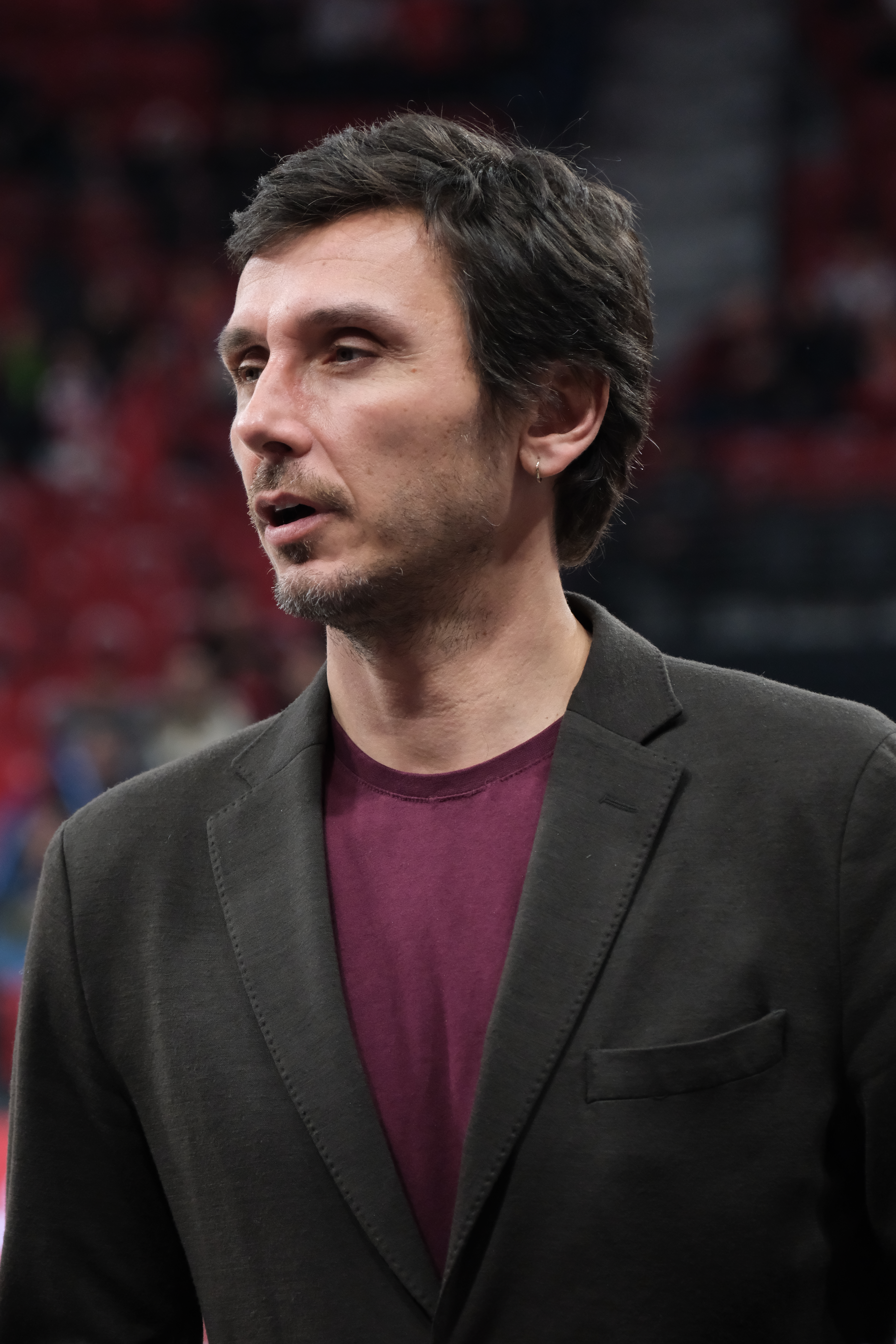

Personal information
- Born: 2 December 1980 (age 45) İzmir, Turkey
- Listed height: 6 ft 6 in (1.98 m)
- Listed weight: 205 lb (93 kg)

Career information
- Playing career: 1998–present
- Position: Shooting guard

Career history
- 1998–2000: Efes Pilsen
- 2000–2001: Antbirlik
- 2001–2003: Beşiktaş
- 2003–2004: Galatasaray
- 2004–2005: Darüşşafaka
- 2005–2006: Tekelspor
- 2006–2010: Galatasaray
- 2010–present: Olin Gençlik

Tufan Ersöz (born 2 December 1980) is a Turkish professional basketball player from İzmir, Turkey. He is a shooting guard playing for Olin Gençlik.

== Professional career ==
He was a basketball player in Efes Pilsen's youth program and he had 4 Turkish Cup Championships. During the 1998–1999 season he rose to the first team of Efes Pilsen. During the 2000–2001 season, he was loaned to Antalya Antbirlik and he became very successful there. He averaged 18, 0 points in 26 matches. During the 2001–2002 season, he was transferred to Beşiktaş and he became the top scorer of his team. He stayed 2 years at Beşiktaş. During the 2003–2004 season he signed a contract with Galatasaray. He played 25 matches and he averaged 12, 4 points. He became the third top scorer that season. During the 2004–2005 season he was transferred to Darüşşafaka but he had a hard time fitting into the system there. During the 2005–2006 season he played at Tekelspor and he averaged 9, 9 points, 2, 1 rebounds and 2, 3 assists. Because of some monetary problems of his team, he had to leave Tekelspor. During the 2006–2007 season he returned to Galatasaray Cafe Crown. Now he's continuing his career in Galatasaray Cafe Crown as the captain of his team.

== Jersey scandal ==
Tufan is also known for a major scandal in Turkish Professional Basketball. At the beginning of the 2009–2010 season, Cemal Nalga (who is also a basketball player on Galatasaray Cafe Crown) got a five match suspension during 23 September 2009 match against Cibona Zagreb. But, he later played in a friendly match against EnBW Ludwigsburg and Deutsche Bank Skyliners and wore the uniform of his good friend Tufan's number 7. He also been with Tufan Ersöz name in matches list. Nalga later received a two-year suspension in Turkey. Tufan also received a four-month suspension for his actions. During 13 December 2009 match against Daruşşafaka, Tufan's suspension finished and he made his return.

== National team career ==
He played 67 matches for the junior national team of Turkey.
