= Doğukan Sönmez =

Turkish basketball player

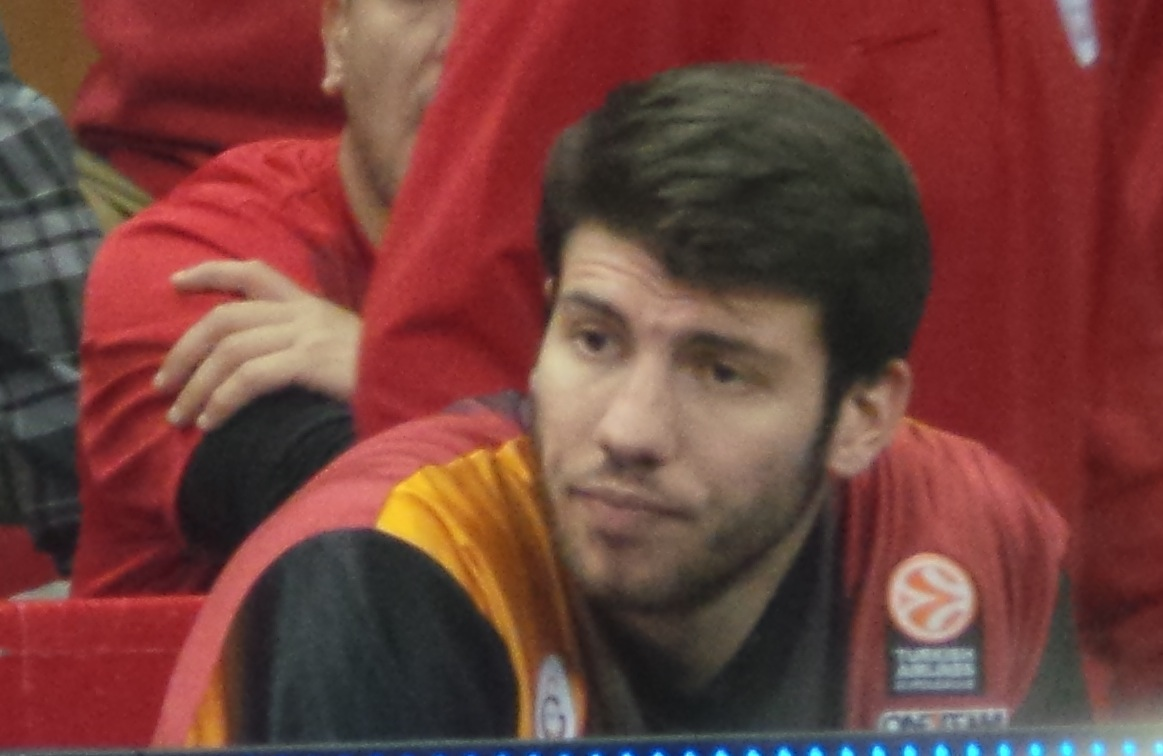

Free Agent
- Position: Center

Personal information
- Born: 1 January 1992 (age 34) Turkey
- Listed height: 6 ft 10 in (2.08 m)

Career information
- Playing career: 2010–present

Career history
- 2007–2013: Galatasaray Youth Basketball Team
- 2013–2014: Galatasaray Liv Hospital
- 2014–2015: Sakarya BSB
- 2015–2016: Konyaspor
- 2016–2017: Banvit
- 2017–2018: Petkim Spor
- 2018–2019: Karesispor
- 2019–2020: Merkezefendi Belediyesi Denizli Basket
- 2020: Lokman Hekim Fethiye Belediyespor

Doğukan Sönmez (born 1 January 1992) is a professional Turkish basketball player. He is 2.09 m tall and plays center. He lastly played for Lokman Hekim Fethiye Belediyespor.

Formerly, he played in Dostluk Spor in Bakırköy, Istanbul.
