= Caner Topaloğlu =

Turkish basketball player

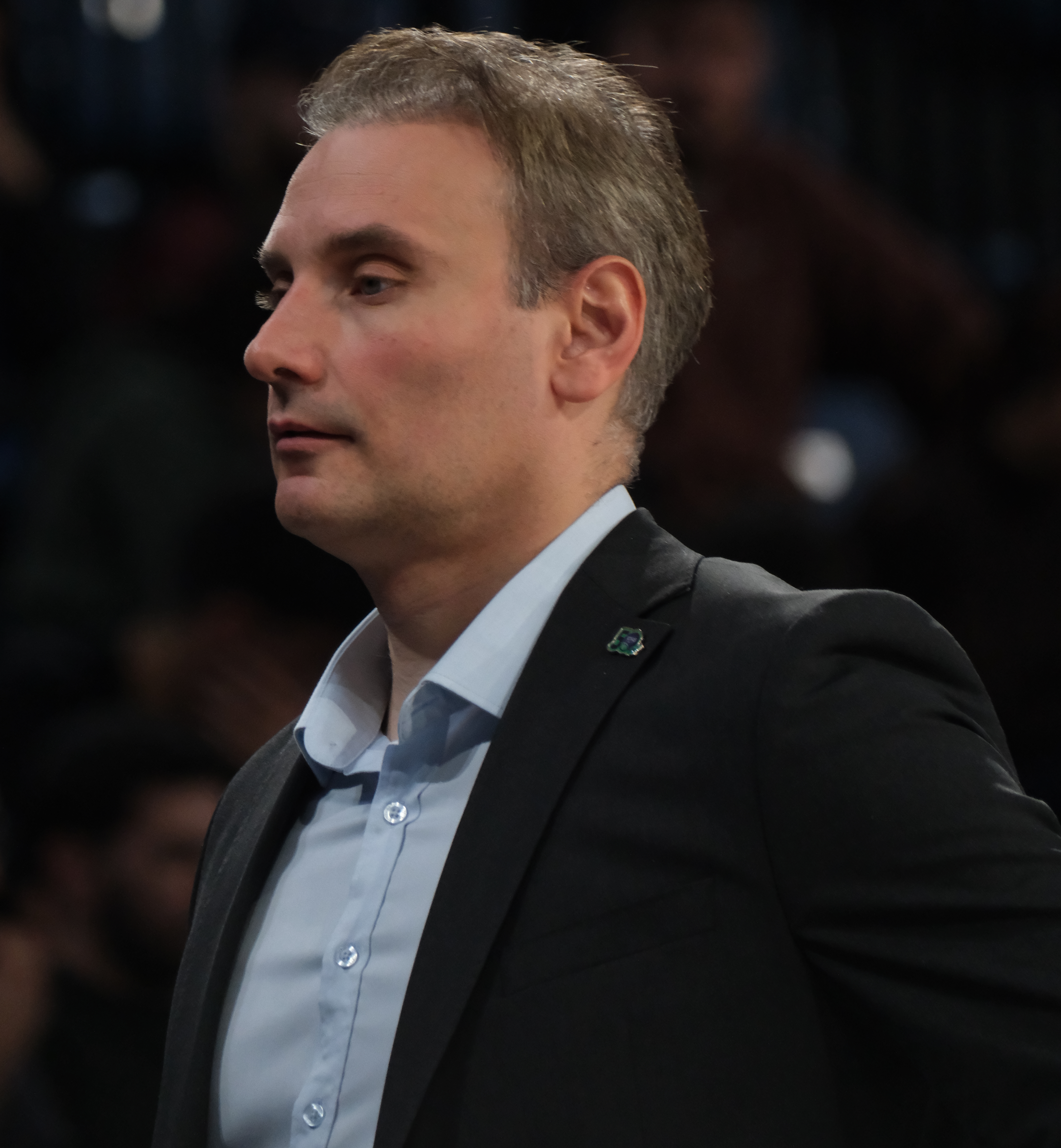
- Topaloğlu with Tofaş

Tofaş
- Title: Assistant coach
- League: Basketbol Süper Ligi

Personal information
- Born: April 17, 1985 (age 41) Trabzon, Turkey
- Listed height: 6 ft 7 in (2.01 m)
- Listed weight: 202 lb (92 kg)

Career information
- NBA draft: 2007: undrafted
- Playing career: 2004–2020
- Position: Small forward

Career history

Playing
- 2004–2005: Ülkerspor
- 2005–2006: Büyük Kolej
- 2006–2009: Banvit
- 2009–2012: Galatasaray
- 2012–2013: Pınar Karşıyaka
- 2013–2014: Beşiktaş
- 2014–2015: İstanbul BB
- 2015–2018: Tofaş
- 2018: Galatasaray
- 2019: İstanbul BB
- 2019–2020: Finalspor

Coaching
- 2024–present: Tofaş (assistant)

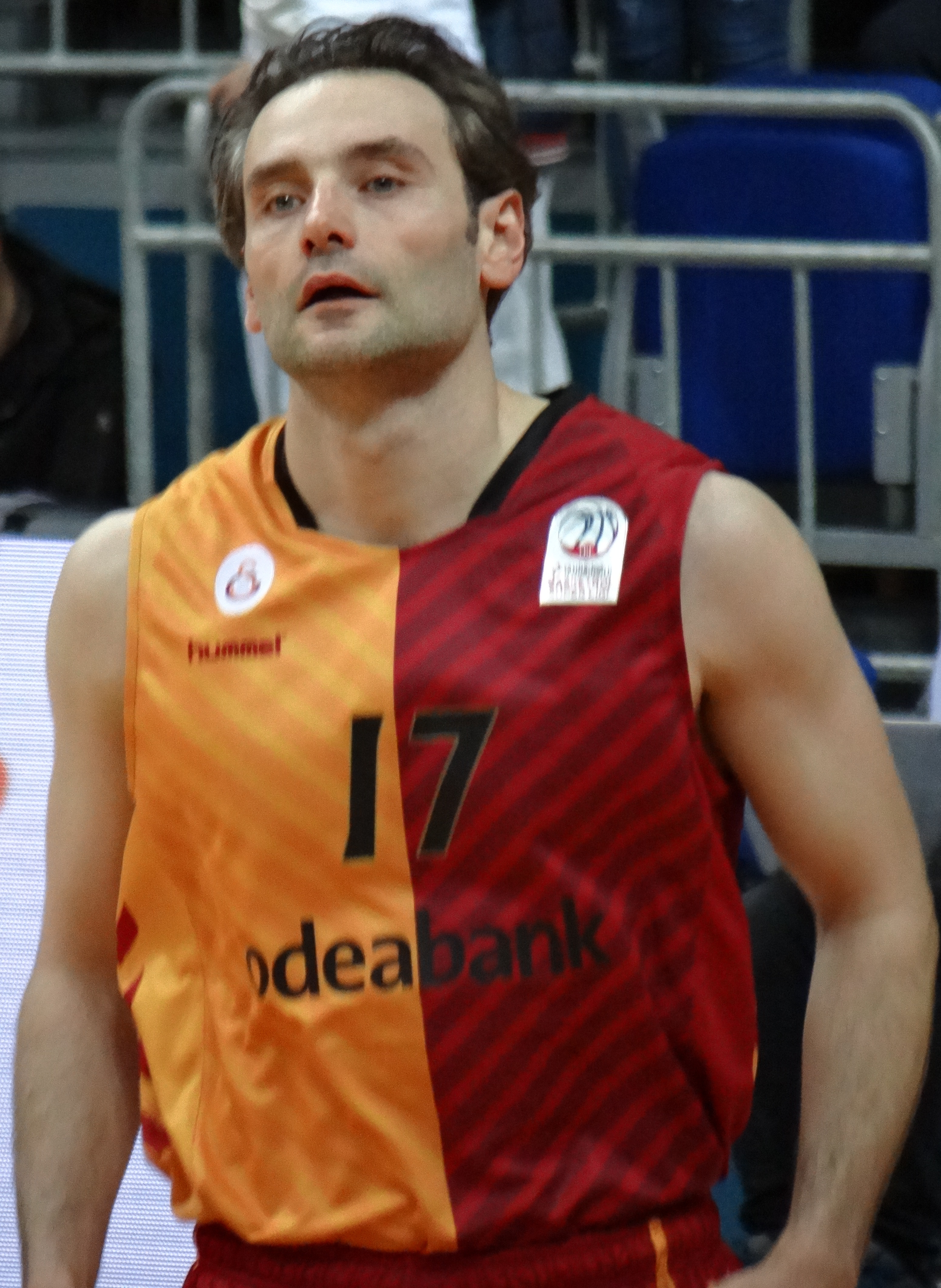
Topaloğlu with Galatasaray

Caner Topaloğlu (born April 17, 1985) is a Turkish former professional basketball player.

== Career ==
On July 25, 2013, Topaloğlu signed a contract with the Turkish team Beşiktaş. After one season, he parted ways with Beşiktaş.

For the 2014–15 season he signed with İstanbul BB.

On June 26, 2015, he signed a three-year deal with Tofaş.

On January 24, 2018, he returned to his old club Galatasaray.

On January 25, 2019, he signed with İstanbul Büyükşehir Belediyespor.

On July 6, 2020, he has announced his retirement from professional basketball.
