= Şemsettin Baş =

Turkish basketball player and coach

Gaziantep Basketbol
- Title: Head coach
- League: Turkish Basketball League

Personal information
- Born: January 4, 1973 (age 53) Istanbul, Turkey
- Listed height: 6 ft 5.75 in (1.97 m)
- Listed weight: 210 lb (95 kg)

Career information
- Playing career: 1990–2010
- Position: Shooting guard / small forward
- Number: 7

Career history

Playing
- 1990–1991: Tekelspor
- 1991–1992: Paşabahçe
- 1992–2000: Tofaş
- 2000–2001: Pınar Karşıyaka
- 2001: Avtodor Saratov
- 2001–2002: Galatasaray
- 2002–2005: Türk Telekom
- 2005–2006: Galatasaray Cafe Crown
- 2008–2009: Potalı Spor
- 2009–2010: TED İstanbul

Coaching
- 2014–2018: Bursaspor
- 2019–2020: CSO Voluntari
- 2021–2022: Peja
- 2025–present: Gaziantep Basketbol

Şemsettin Baş (born January 4, 1973, in Istanbul, Turkey) is a Turkish professional basketball coach and former player. He is the current head coach for Gaziantep Basketbol of the Türkiye Basketbol Ligi (TBL). At 6 ft 5.75 in (1.97 m), he played as a shooting guard and small forward.

He is of Bosniak origin and cousin of former NBA and Euroleague player Mirsad Türkcan.
