= Cemal Nalga =

Turkish basketball player (born 1987)

No. 35 – Balıkesir Büyükşehir Belediyespor
- Position: Center
- League: TBL

Personal information
- Born: 16 September 1987 (age 39) İzmir, Turkey
- Listed height: 6 ft 10 in (2.08 m)
- Listed weight: 120 kg (265 lb)

Career information
- NBA draft: 2009: undrafted
- Playing career: 2003–present

Career history
- 2003–2006: Tuborg Pilsener
- 2006–2009: Galatasaray
- 2009–2010: ALBA Berlin
- 2010–2011: Lietuvos Rytas
- 2011–2012: Banvit
- 2012–2013: Beşiktaş
- 2013–2014: Türk Telekom
- 2014–2015: Pınar Karşıyaka
- 2015–2016: İstanbul BB
- 2016–2017: Eskişehir Basket
- 2017–2018: Bahçeşehir Koleji
- 2018–2019: Afyon Belediye
- 2019–2020: Petkim Spor
- 2020–present: Balıkesir Büyükşehir Belediyespor

Career highlights
- Turkish League champion (2015)
Medals
Men's basketball
Representing Turkey
FIBA Europe Under-18 Championship
Silver medal – second place	2005 Serbia and Montenegro	U-18 Team
Mediterranean Games
Gold medal – first place	2013 Mersin	Team
Bronze medal – third place	2009 Pescara	Team

Cemal Nalga (born 16 September 1987) is a Turkish professional basketball player for Balıkesir Büyükşehir Belediyespor of the Turkish Basketball First League(TBL). He plays the center position.

== Jersey scandal ==
Nalga is also known for a major scandal in Turkish Professional Basketball. At the beginning of the 2009–2010 season, Cemal Nalga (who is also a basketball player on Galatasaray Café Crown) got a five match suspension during 23 September 2009 match against Cibona Zagreb. But, he later played in a friendly match against EnBW Ludwigsburg and Deutsche Bank Skyliners and wore the uniform of his good friend Tufan's number 7. He has also been with Tufan Ersöz name in matches list. Nalga later received a two-year suspension in Turkey. Tufan also received a four-month suspension for his actions.

For the 2014–15 season, he signed with Pınar Karşıyaka.

On 3 September 2019, he signed with Petkim Spor of the TBL.

On 27 August 2020, he signed with Balıkesir Büyükşehir Belediyespor of the Turkish Basketball First League(TBL).

== Awards ==
=== National ===
- 2005 FIBA Europe Under-18 Championship – Silver
- 2009 Mediterranean Games – Bronze
- 2013 Mediterranean Games – Gold
