= Cüneyt Erden =

Turkish basketball player (born 1977)

Personal information
- Born: 5 September 1977 (age 49) Bursa, Turkey
- Listed height: 6 ft 1 in (1.85 m)
- Listed weight: 196 lb (89 kg)

Career information
- Playing career: 1995–2011
- Position: Point guard

Career history
- 1995–2000: Tofaş
- 2000–2002: Türk Telekom
- 2002–2005: Darüşşafaka
- 2002: →Pınar Karşıyaka
- 2005–2006: Ülkerspor
- 2006–2007: Efes Pilsen
- 2007–2009: Galatasaray Café Crown
- 2009–2010: Kepez Belediyespor
- 2010–2011: Beşiktaş Cola Turka

Cüneyt Erden (born 5 September 1977) is a Turkish professional basketball coach, commentator and former player who played at the point guard position.
