= Murat Özyer =

Turkish basketball player and coach

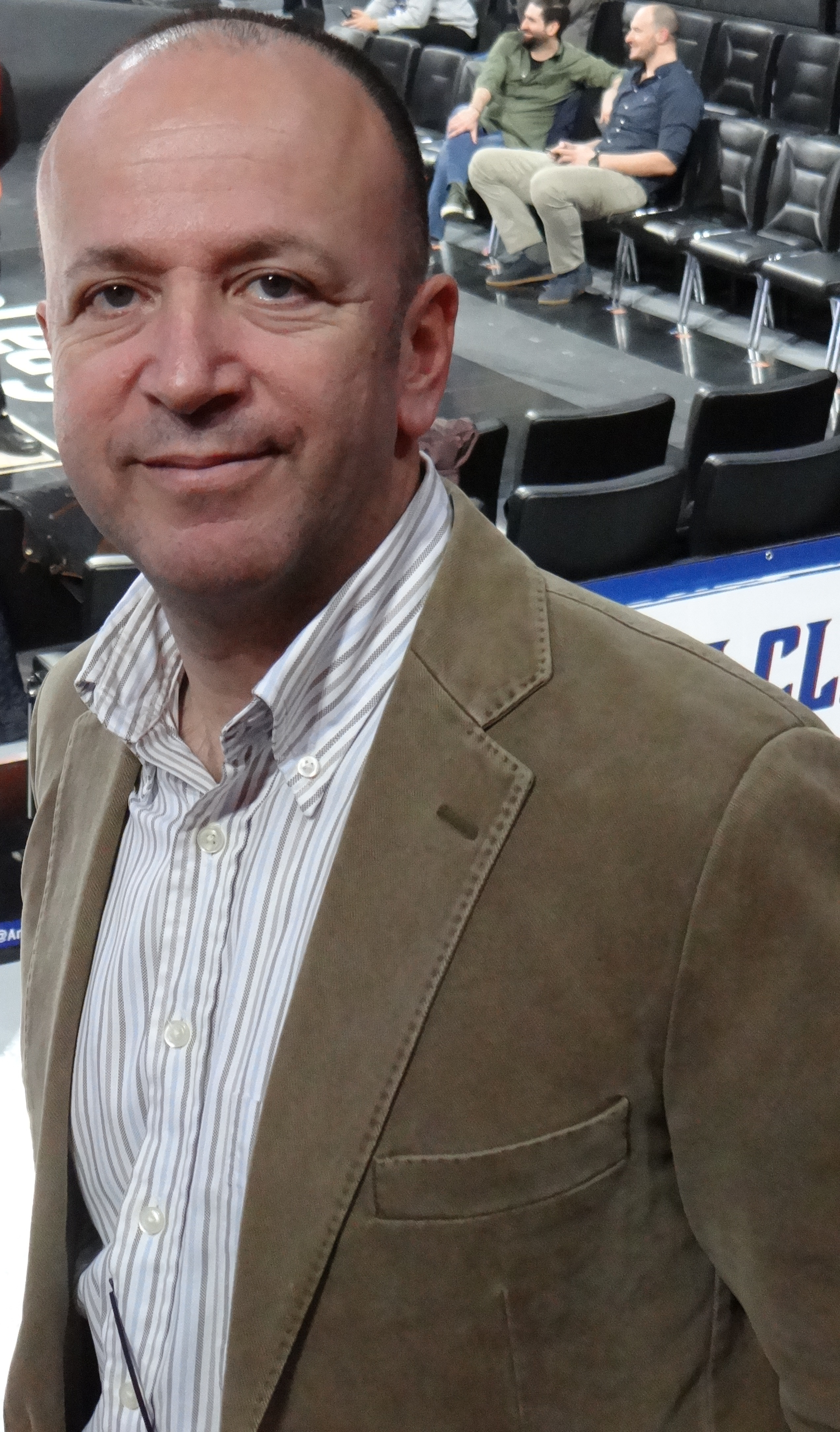
Murat Özyer in 2018

Necdet Murat Özyer (born 31 March 1966) is a former Turkish national basketball player. He is now the coordinator of Galatasaray Medical Park men' s basketball team.

== Coaching career ==
Özyer began his coaching career at Galatasaray, where he managed the starlet and youth teams from 1983 to 1993. He later joined Ülkerspor, overseeing the foundation of its youth team. Following this, he coached the youth team from 1993 to 1996. Özyer was subsequently tasked as the assistant coach of the senior team and achieved the TBL title twice (during the 1997–98 and 2000-01 seasons). In March 2006 he was appointed as the coach of Ülkerspor seniors and achieved the league title after Ergin Ataman's resignation.

After his spell at Ülkerspor, Özyer joined Galatasaray in the 2006-07 season, guiding the team to the semi-finals of the league play-offs.

In the most recent season, Galatasaray participated in the ULEB Cup 2007-08 Final Eight and beat its domestic rivals Beşiktaş in the quarterfinals. However, the team was eliminated in the semi-finals by the Spanish side DKV Joventut. Galatasaray was beaten by Türk Telekom B.K. after a 3–0 series in the play-off semis.

== Personal life ==
Özyer was born on born 31 March 1966 in Istanbul. He is married to Derya Özyer. He is an alumnus of Galatasaray High School and graduated from Marmara University with a degree in Business Administration.

== Honours ==
=== Coach ===
- (Turkey) Galatasaray Café Crown
  - Uleb Cup
    - 2007-08 Semi Finals
- (Turkey) Ülkerspor
  - Turkish Basketball League
    - 2005-06 Champion

=== Assistant Coach ===
- (Turkey) Ülkerspor
  - Turkish Basketball League
    - 1997-98, 2000-01 Champion
