= Teoman Örge =

Turkish basketball player (born 1990)

Gelişim Koleji
- Position: Shooting guard
- League: Turkish Second Basketball League

Personal information
- Born: March 27, 1990 (age 36) Stuttgart, West Germany
- Listed height: 6 ft 3 in (1.91 m)

Career information
- Playing career: 2007–present

Career history
- 2007–2008: Alpella
- 2008–2009: Galatasaray Café Crown
- 2009–2010: Antalya Büyükşehir Belediyesi
- 2010–present: Gelişim Koleji

Teoman Örge (born March 27, 1990) is a Turkish professional basketball player of Gelişim Koleji.
