= Muratcan Güler =

Turkish basketball player (born 1980)

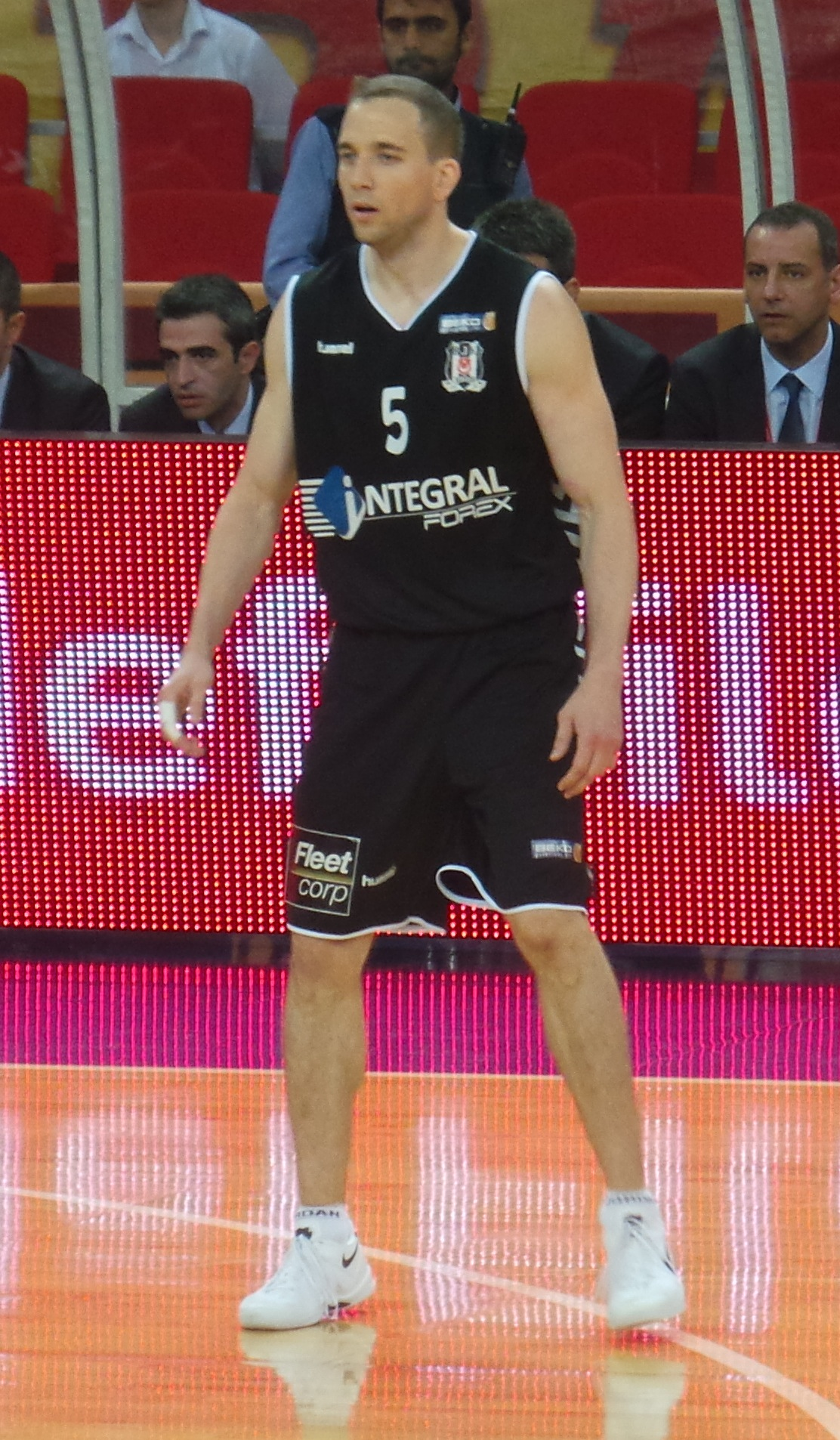

Personal information
- Born: February 25, 1980 (age 46) Istanbul, Turkey
- Listed height: 6 ft 2 in (1.88 m)
- Listed weight: 180 lb (82 kg)

Career information
- NBA draft: 2002: undrafted
- Playing career: 1997–present
- Position: Point guard

Career history
- 1997–1998: İTÜ
- 1999–2001: Beşiktaş
- 2001–2002: Ülkerspor
- 2002–2003: Galatasaray
- 2003–2004: Ülkerspor
- 2004–2006: Pınar Karşıyaka
- 2006–2008: Türk Telekom
- 2008–2010: Beşiktaş Cola Turka
- 2010–2011: Antalya BB
- 2011–2012: Türk Telekom
- 2012–2018: Beşiktaş

Muratcan Güler (born February 25, 1980) is a Turkish professional former basketball player. He is currently playing for Beşiktaş of the Turkish Basketball League. He plays the point guard position and 1.88 m (6 ft 2 in) tall and weighs 82 kg (181 lb).

He is son of former basketball player Necati Güler and older brother of basketball player Sinan Güler. He studied at Istanbul Kültür University.

== International career ==
Muratcan Güler has been called up sometimes for Turkish national team.
