= Ankara DSİ S.K. =

Mamak Belediyesi Ankara DSİ Era
- Leagues: TB3L
- Founded: 2011; 15 years ago
- History: Ankara DSİ Era (2011–2014); Mamak Bld. Ankara DSİ Era (2014–present)
- Arena: Mamak Belediyesi Sports Hall
- Capacity: 4,250
- Location: Ankara, Turkey
- Team colors: Green and White
- President: Doğan Hakyemez
- Head coach: Yücel Platin
- Website: http://www.dsispor.org.tr/7/basketbol
Home	Away

Ankara DSİ Era Gençlik ve Spor Kulübü, more commonly known as Ankara DSİ or Mamak Belediyesi Ankara DSİ Era is a Turkish professional basketball club based in Mamak, Ankara which plays in the Turkish Basketball League (TBL). The team was founded by State Hydraulic Works in 2011. Their home arena is Mamak Belediyesi Sports Hall with a capacity of 4,250 seats. The team is sponsored by Mamak Municipality and ERA Group of Companies.

== Season by season ==
Season	Tier	League	Pos.
2012–13	3	TB3L	1st
2013–14	2	T2BL	14th
2014–15	2	TBL	16th
2015–16	2	TBL	17th
2016–17	4	TB3L	

Source: Eurobasket.com

== Notable players ==
Note: Flags indicate national team eligibility at FIBA-sanctioned events. Players may hold other non-FIBA nationalities not displayed.

Criteria

To appear in this section a player must have either:

- Set a club record or won an individual award while at the club
- Played at least one official international match for their national team at any time
- Played at least one official NBA match at any time.

- (Kosovo) Yll Kaçaniku
- (United States) Jason Clark
- (United States) Chance Comanche
