= Tofaş S.K. =

Turkish basketball club

Tofaş Bursa
- Leagues: Basketbol Süper Ligi; EuroCup
- Founded: 1974; 52 years ago
- History: Tofaş (1974–present)
- Arena: Tofaş Nilüfer Spor Salonu
- Capacity: 7,500
- Location: Bursa, Turkey
- Team colors: Blue, white, green
- President: Cengiz Eroldu
- Head coach: Massimo Cancellieri
- Team captain: Yiğitcan Saybir
- Championships: 2 Turkish Championships; 3 Turkish Cups; 1 Turkish Super Cup
- Website: tofasspor.com
Home	Away	Third

Tofaş Spor Kulübü (Turkish: Tofaş Sports Club), or simply Tofaş S.K. or Tofaş, and in European competitions as Tofaş Bursa, is a professional basketball team that is based in Bursa, Turkey. The team's name comes from being sponsored by Turkish car manufacturer Tofaş. Tofaş's home arena is the Tofaş Nilüfer Spor Salonu, with a capacity of 7,500 seats. The team competes in the Turkish Basketbol Süper Ligi (BSL) and the EuroCup.

== History ==
Former logo of the club

Tofaş was founded in 1974. The team won the BSL in two consecutive seasons, in the 1998–99 and 1999–2000 seasons. The following year, however, the team withdrew from the league, for financial reasons. They returned to competition in the BSL in the 2003–04 season, but were relegated to a league level the following year.

Tofaş next played in the BSL, from the 2009–10 season, to the 2014–15 season. In addition to the club's two Turkish Super League titles (1999, 2000), the team has also won three Turkish Cups (1993, 1999, 2000), and a Turkish President's Cup (1999). The team was the runner-up in the European-wide third-tier level FIBA Korać Cup's 1996–97 season Final against the Greek club Aris Thessaloniki.

Tofaş also competed in the European-wide top-tier level EuroLeague, in the 1999–2000 season.

In 2015, Tofaş was relegated from the BSL to the First League. The club was immediately promoted back as it was the 2016 TBL champion. The club played in the European-wide second-tier level EuroCup, in the 2017–18 season. The same season, Tofaş reached the 2018 finals of the BSL. Despite winning game 3 at home, the team fell to Fenerbahçe and lost the series 4–1.

== Arenas ==
Tofaş S.K. used the 3,500-seat capacity Bursa Atatürk Sport Hall, as its home arena for many years. The club then moved into the 7,500-seat capacity Tofaş Nilüfer Spor Salonu.

== Players ==
=== Current roster ===
Tofaş roster
Players
Coaches

Pos.	No.	Nat.	Name	Ht.	Wt.	Age
G/F	2	(Turkey)	Gönül, Berkay	2.02 m (6 ft 8 in)		19 – 22 June 2007
PF	3	(Turkey)	Saybir, Yiğitcan (C)	2.04 m (6 ft 8 in)	88 kg (194 lb)	27 – 27 February 1999
G	4	(Turkey)	Çorumlular, Kerem	2.01 m (6 ft 7 in)		18 – 28 March 2008
C	5	(United States)	Carter II, Terrell	2.08 m (6 ft 10 in)	132 kg (291 lb)	30 – 6 January 1996
PF	6	(Turkey)	Kabaca, Sadık Emir	2.11 m (6 ft 11 in)	98 kg (216 lb)	25 – 13 December 2000
F	7	(Turkey)	Efeoğlu, Karahan	2.03 m (6 ft 8 in)		22 – 13 June 2004
C	8	(United States)	McNeace, Jamuni	2.08 m (6 ft 10 in)	101 kg (223 lb)	30 – 25 March 1996
G	10	(United States)	Nutall, Zach	1.90 m (6 ft 3 in)	92 kg (203 lb)	26 – 16 December 1999
F	14	(Turkey)	Bağadır, Soykan	2.06 m (6 ft 9 in)		18 – 1 April 2008
F	15	(United States)	Thurman, Tre'Shawn	2.01 m (6 ft 7 in)		30 – 15 December 1995
SG	17	(Lithuania)	Rubštavičius, Mantas	1.98 m (6 ft 6 in)	84 kg (185 lb)	24 – 6 May 2002
SG	22	(Netherlands) (Turkey)	Postel, Efe	1.89 m (6 ft 2 in)		27 – 3 June 1999
F/C	24	(Turkey)	Serbest, Emirhan	2.05 m (6 ft 9 in)		19 – 17 March 2007
PG	32	(United States)	Jones, Bryce	1.83 m (6 ft 0 in)	79 kg (174 lb)	32 – 12 October 1994
G	33	(United States)	Reynolds Jr., Shavar	1.88 m (6 ft 2 in)	88 kg (194 lb)	28 – 11 May 1998
F	35	(Turkey)	Paşaoğlu, Poyraz	2.01 m (6 ft 7 in)		18 – 4 January 2008
F	44	(United States)	Brown, Gabe	2.01 m (6 ft 7 in)	94 kg (207 lb)	26 – 5 March 2000
SG	55	(Turkey)	Apaydın, Leon Harun	1.93 m (6 ft 4 in)		27 – 1 January 1999

Head coach

- (Italy) Massimo Cancellieri

Assistant coach(es)

- (Turkey) Sinan Çambel
- (Turkey) Serdar Ergök
- (Turkey) Jovan Gorec
- (Turkey) Caner Topaloğlu

Legend

- (C) Team captain
- Injured

- Roster
Updated: November 8, 2026

=== Depth chart ===
Pos.	Starting 5	Bench 1	Bench 2	Bench 3
C	Sadık Emir Kabaca	Jamuni McNeace	Terrell Carter II
PF	Yiğitcan Saybir	Tre'Shawn Thurman	Emirhan Serbest	Rıza Poyraz Paşaoğlu
SF	Gabe Brown	Mustafa Soykan Bağadir		Karahan Efeoğlu
SG	Shavar Reynolds Jr.	Ahmet Burkay Gönül	Efe Postel	Leon Harun Apaydın
PG	Zach Nutall	Kerem Çorumlular	Bryce Jones

== Notable players ==
- (United Kingdom) (United States) Tarik Phillip
- (Turkey) Alper Yılmaz
- (Turkey) - (Bosnia and Herzegovina) Asım Pars
- (Turkey) Can Altıntığ
- (Turkey) Cüneyt Erden
- (Turkey) Efe Aydan
- (Turkey) Kenan Sipahi
- (Turkey) Levent Topsakal
- (Turkey) Mehmet Okur
- (Turkey) Mehmet Yağmur
- (Turkey) Hakan Köseoğlu
- (Turkey) İlkan Karaman
- (Turkey) İnanç Koç
- (Turkey) Serkan Erdoğan
- (Turkey) Şemsettin Baş
- (Turkey) Tolga Geçim
- (Canada) Tyler Ennis
- (Croatia) Vladan Alanović
- (Croatia) Slaven Rimac
- (Croatia) Željko Šakić
- (Croatia) Jurica Žuža
- (Lithuania) Mindaugas Lukauskis
- (Lithuania) Artūras Milaknis
- (Lithuania) Eigirdas Žukauskas
- (Lithuania) Deividas Dulkys
- (Lithuania) Marek Blaževič
- (Russia) Sergei Bazarevich
- (Serbia) Vasilije Micić
- (Slovenia) Jure Zdovc
- (South Sudan) (United States) Nuni Omot
- (United States) Chris Booker
- (United States) Brandon Bowman
- (United States) Bradley Buckman
- (United States) - (Ukraine) Steve Burtt, Jr.
- (United States) Rashard Griffith
- (United States) Demonte Harper
- (United States) Josh Heytvelt
- (United States) Marc Jackson
- (United States) Buck Johnson
- (United States) J. J. O'Brien
- (United States) David Rivers
- (United States) Steven Rogers
- (United States) Ronald Steele
- (United States) Austin Wiley
- (United States) Cassius Winston
- (United States) Jeff Withey

== Honours ==
=== Domestic competitions ===
- Turkish League

Winners (2): 1998–99, 1999–00
Runners-up (3): 1977–78, 1990–91, 2017–18

- Turkish Cup

Winners (3): 1993, 1998–99, 1999–00
Runners-up (1): 2018

- Turkish Super Cup

Winners (1): 1999
Runners-up (2): 1991, 1993

=== European competitions ===
- FIBA Korać Cup

Runners-up (1): 1996–97

== Season by season ==
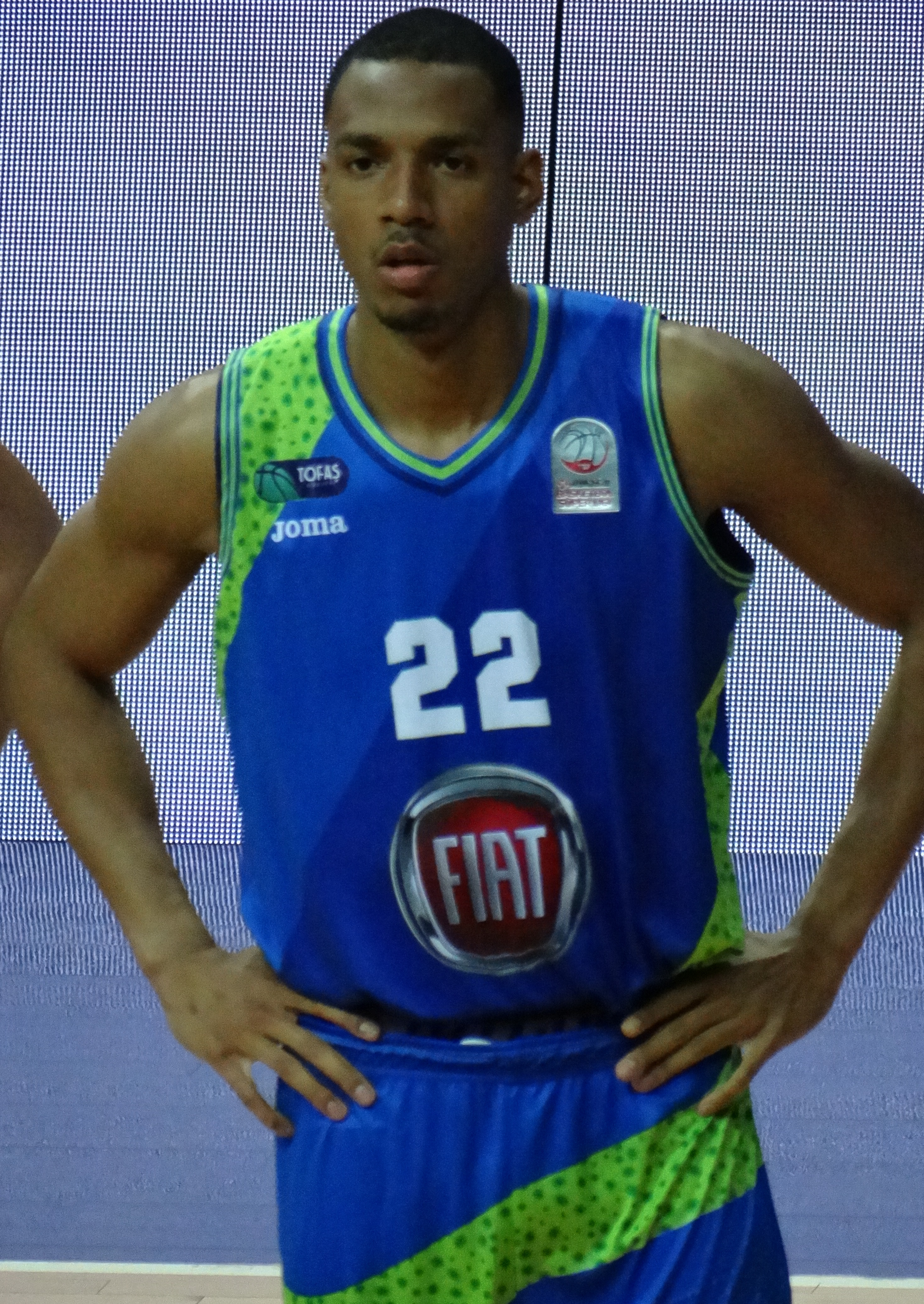
Josh Owens

Season	Tier	Division	Pos.	Turkish Cup	European competitions	
1974–76	Lower divisions					
1976–77	1	TBL	7th			
1977–78	1	TBL	2nd			
1978–79	1	TBL	4th			
1979–80	1	TBL	6th			
1980–81	1	TBL	5th			
1981–82	1	TBL	4th			
1982–83	1	TBL	8th			
1983–84	1	TBL	9th			
1984–85	1	TBL	7th			
1985–86	1	TBL	8th			
1986–87	1	TBL	6th			
1987–88	1	TBL	6th			
1988–89	1	TBL	11th			
1989–90	2	TB2L	1st			
1990–91	1	TBL	2nd		3 Korać Cup	1R
1991–92	1	TBL	6th		2 European Cup	2R
1992–93	1	TBL	5th	Champion	3 Korać Cup	3R
1993–94	1	TBL	6th		2 European Cup	GS
1994–95	1	TBL	4th		3 Korać Cup	R32
1995–96	1	TBL	4th		3 Korać Cup	3R
1996–97	1	TBL	4th		3 Korać Cup	RU
1997–98	1	TBL	4th		2 EuroCup	R16
1998–99	1	TBL	1st	Champion	2 Saporta Cup	QF
1999–00	1	TBL	1st	Champion	1 Euroleague	GS
2000–03	Lower divisions					
2003–04	1	TBL	14th	Group stage		
2004–05	2	TB2L	1st			
2005–06	2	TB2L	1st			
2006–07	1	TBL	15th	Group stage		
2007–08	2	TB2L	1st	Quarterfinalist		
2008–09	2	TB2L	1st			
2009–10	1	TBL	10th	Group stage		
2010–11	1	TBL	9th	Group stage		
2011–12	1	TBL	8th	Quarterfinalist		
2012–13	1	TBL	8th	Group stage	3 EuroChallenge	L16
2013–14	1	TBL	8th	Quarterfinalist	3 EuroChallenge	RS
2014–15	1	TBL	16th	Group stage	3 EuroChallenge	RS
2015–16	2	TBL	1st			
2016–17	1	BSL	8th			
2017–18	1	BSL	2nd	Runner-up	2 EuroCup	RS
2018–19	1	BSL	3rd	Quarterfinalist	2 EuroCup	RS
2019–20	1	BSL	5th^{1}		2 EuroCup	QF^{1}
2020–21	1	BSL	4th		3 Champions League	R16
2021–22	1	BSL	9th	Quarterfinalist	3 Champions League	QF
2022–23	1	BSL	7th		3 Champions League	PI
2023–24	1	BSL	11th	Quarterfinalist	3 Champions League	PO
2024–25	1	BSL	4th	Quarterfinalist	4 FIBA Europe Cup	QF
2025–26	1	BSL	10th	Quarterfinalist	3 Champions League	R16

^1 Cancelled due to the COVID-19 pandemic in Europe.
