= Torku Konyaspor B.K. =

Turkish basketball team

Konyaspor Basket
- Founded: 1987
- Dissolved: 2016
- History: Mutlu Aku Selcuk Universitesi (–2012); Torku Selcuk Universitesi (2012–2014); Torku Konyaspor (2014–2015); Konyaspor Basketbol Kulubu (2015–2016)
- Arena: Selçuklu Belediyesi Sport Hall
- Capacity: 3,800
- Location: Konya, Turkey
- Team colors: Green and White
- Website: www.konyasporbasket.org
Home	Away

Konyaspor Basket was a Turkish professional basketball team from the city of Konya.

== History ==
The club was founded by Selçuk University in 1987.

In August 2014 the club changed its name to Konyaspor Basketbol in order to gain more support from the citizens of Konya and fan groups from Konyaspor. The club has no ties to the football club of Konya but only changed it for better sponsorship and fan groups reasons.

== History ==
- Mutlu Aku Selcuk Universitesi (–2012)
- Torku Selcuk Universitesi (2012–2014)
- Torku Konyaspor (2014–2015)
- Konyaspor Basketbol Kulubu (2015–2016)

== Season by season ==
Season	Tier	League	Pos.	Turkish Cup	European competitions
2012–13	2	TB2L	2nd		
2013–14	1	TBL	13th		
2014–15	1	TBL	11th		
2015–16	1	BSL	16th		

== Players ==
=== Notable players ===
Note: Flags indicate national team eligibility at FIBA-sanctioned events. Players may hold other non-FIBA nationalities not displayed.

Criteria

To appear in this section a player must have either:

- Set a club record or won an individual award while at the club
- Played at least one official international match for their national team at any time
- Played at least one official NBA match at any time.

- (Turkey) Yunus Çankaya
- (Nigeria) - (United States) Ekene Ibekwe
- (United States) Kevin Braswell
- (United States) Sean Williams
- (United States) Troy DeVries
- (United States) Warren Carter
- (United States) Hakim Warrick
- (Lithuania) Tomas Delininkaitis
