= Caprus (disambiguation) =

Caprus is a town of ancient Greece.

Caprus or Kapros (Ancient Greek: Κάπρος) may also refer to:

- Caprus (island), an island of ancient Chalcidice, Macedonia, Greece
- Caprus (river), a river of ancient Mesopotamia
- Caprus, a small stream near Laodicea on the Lycus
