= Denizli Basket (2006) =

- Nickname: Horozlar (Roosters)
- Leagues: TBL
- Founded: 2006
- Dissolved: 2016
- History: Pamukkale Üniversitesi (2006–2014); Denizli Basket (2014–2016)
- Arena: Pamukkale University Arena
- Capacity: 5,000
- Location: Denizli, Turkey
- Team colors: Bottle Green and Navy
- Website: http://www.denizlibasket.com/
Home	Away

Sinpaş Denizli Basket, also known as Pamukkale Üniversitesi Basketbol Kulübü, was a Turkish professional basketball club. It was based in Denizli and played in the Turkish Basketball First League. The team was founded by the Pamukkale University Youth Sports Club in 2006. The club changed its name to Denizli Basket in 2014. Their home arena was Pamukkale University Arena in the PAU Kınıklı Campus, with a capacity of 5,000 seats. The team was sponsored by Sinpaş, a construction company in Turkey. The team was dissolved in 2016.

== History ==
Pamukkale Üniversitesi logo (2006–2014)

Denizli Basket was founded as Pamukkale Üniversitesi Gençlik ve Spor Kulübü by Pamukkale University in 1998. The club participated in EBBL in 1998–99 season for the first time in their history. It was a successful season and they advanced to TB2L. Subsequently, the club ended the basketball organization due to financial reasons.

In 2006, the team reformed as Pamukkale Üniversitesi Basketbol of Pamukkale Üniversitesi Gençlik ve Spor Kulübü. The team began playing in the EBBL for the 2006–2007 season. In the 2007–2008 season, the team was promoted to TB2L as the champion of EBBL. The following season, the team was relegated. Until the 2013–2014 season, the team played moved between TB2L and EBBL (TB3L).

The following season, the club management found sponsors; leading to a subsequent name change to Aydem Pamukkale Üniversitesi. The club increased its budget and signed veteran coach Gökhan Taştimur. The team finished sixth and qualified for the playoffs. In the quarterfinal, Aydem Pamukkale Üniversitesi beat Vestel with a 2–1 series. In the semi-final, Aydem Pamukkale Üniversitesi lost to İstanbul BB with a 3–1 series and lost the promotion chance.

On 12 August 2014, the club changed its name again, this time to Denizli Basket. Currently, the club is called Sinpaş Denizli Basket for sponsorship reasons.

== Sponsorship naming ==
- Pamukkale Üniversitesi: 2006–2013
- Gamateks Pamukkale Üniversitesi: 2013
- Aydem Pamukkale Üniversitesi: 2013–2014
- Sinpaş Denizli Basket: 2014–2016

== Current roster ==
Denizli Basket roster
Players
Coaches

Pos.	No.	Nat.	Name	Ht.	Wt.	Age
PG	0	(Turkey)	Saraloğlu, Utku	1.88 m (6 ft 2 in)	82 kg (181 lb)	19 – 17 July 1996
PG	3	(United States)	Boynton, Kenny	1.88 m (6 ft 2 in)	86 kg (190 lb)	24 – 12 May 1991
PG	4	(Turkey)	Türel, İlker	1.88 m (6 ft 2 in)	85 kg (187 lb)	32 – 1 July 1983
SG	10	(Turkey)	Yiğit, Doğan Deniz	1.98 m (6 ft 6 in)		26 – 16 September 1989
SF	11	(Turkey)	Özdoğan, Mehmet	1.97 m (6 ft 6 in)	90 kg (198 lb)	28 – 6 February 1987
C	12	(Turkey)	Karabıyık, Gökhan	2.07 m (6 ft 9 in)		27 – 20 May 1988
PF	15	(Turkey)	Görür, Mustafa Baki	2.05 m (6 ft 9 in)		27 – 6 August 1988
SG	23	(Turkey)	Erol, Burak	1.97 m (6 ft 6 in)		27 – 1 January 1988
F	33	(Finland)	Odabasi, Anton (DC)	2.06 m (6 ft 9 in)	104 kg (229 lb)	20 – 8 August 1995
PF	41	(Turkey)	Ergin, Sercan	2.01 m (6 ft 7 in)		32 – 8 September 1983
C	64	(United States)	Armstrong, Hilton	2.11 m (6 ft 11 in)	107 kg (236 lb)	30 – 23 November 1984

Head coach

- (Turkey) Hakan Yavuz

Assistant coach(es)

- (Turkey) Gökhan Güney
- (Turkey) Ali Ruhi Balkanlı

Strength & conditioning coach(es)

- (Turkey) Özer Özeler
- (Turkey) Gültekin İpek

Team manager

- (Turkey) Kıvanç Ayvalıoğlu

Legend

- (C) Team captain
- (DC) Dual citizenship
- Injured

- Roster
Updated: November 13, 2015

=== Notable players ===
Note: Flags indicate national team eligibility at FIBA-sanctioned events. Players may hold other non-FIBA nationalities not displayed.

Criteria

To appear in this section a player must have either:

- Set a club record or won an individual award while at the club
- Played at least one official international match for their national team at any time
- Played at least one official NBA match at any time.

- (Turkey) Polat Kocaoğlu
- (Turkey) Eren Beyaz
- (Turkey) Gürol Karamahmut
- (Slovenia) Hasan Rizvić
- (Latvia) Armands Šķēle
- (United States) Tyler Stone
- (United States) Hilton Armstrong
- (United States) Osiris Eldridge
- (Israel) Robert Rothbart

== See also ==
- Pamukkale University
- Turkish Basketball Second League
