= Kapros (disambiguation) =

Kapros is a town of ancient Greece.

Kapros may also refer to:

- Anikó Kapros (born 1983), Hungarian tennis player
- Kapros, alternate name of various locations in antiquity; see Caprus (disambiguation)
