= Pamukkale University Arena =

Multi-purpose venue at Pamukkale University, Denizli, Turkey

- Pamukkale Üniversitesi Spor Salonu
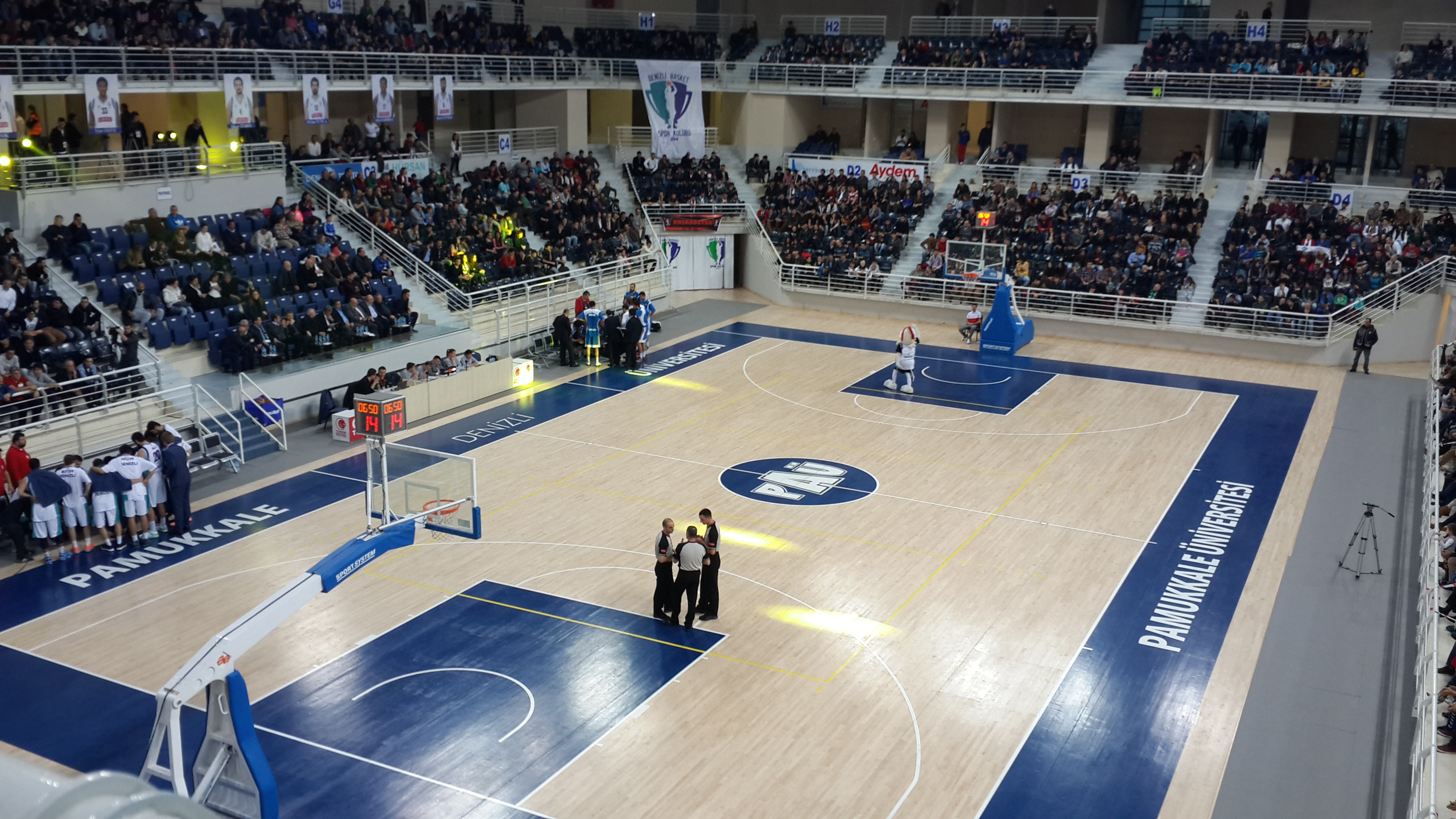
- Interactive map of Pamukkale University Arena
- Location: Kınıklı, Pamukkale, Denizli, Turkey
- Coordinates: 37.737916°N 29.094967°E
- Owner: Pamukkale University
- Capacity: 5,000
- Surface: Wood flooring

Construction
- Opened: 2014; 12 years ago

Tenant
- Denizli Basket (BSL)

Pamukkale University Arena (Turkish: Pamukkale Üniversitesi Spor Salonu) is an indoor multi-purpose sport venue that is located in the Pamukkale University, Denizli, Turkey. Opened in 2014, the hall has a seating capacity of 5,000 spectators. It was formerly the home for the now-dissolved Denizli Basket. Currently, it is home for the 2017 club sharing the same name, which plays currently in the BSL.

== Gallery ==
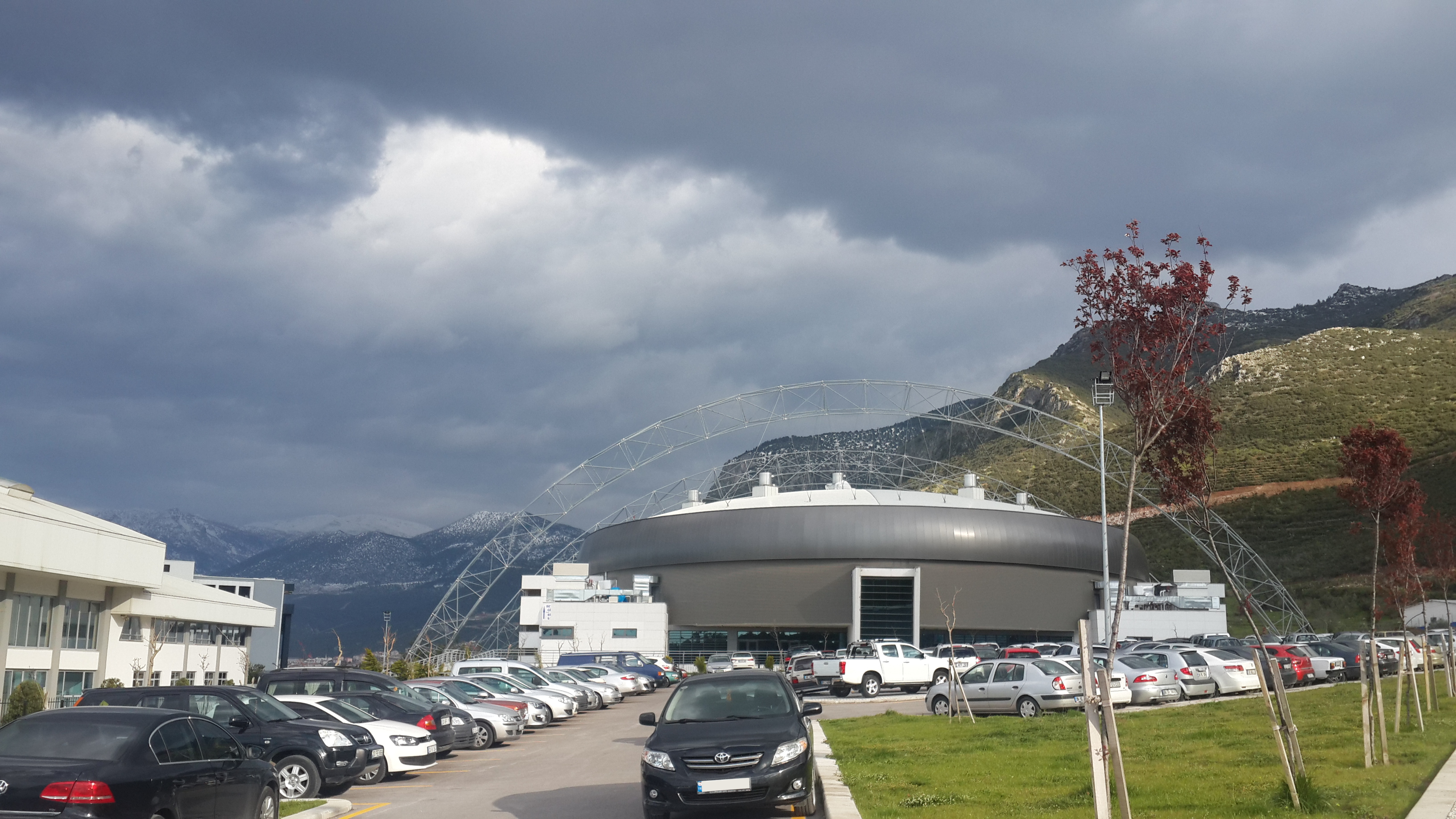

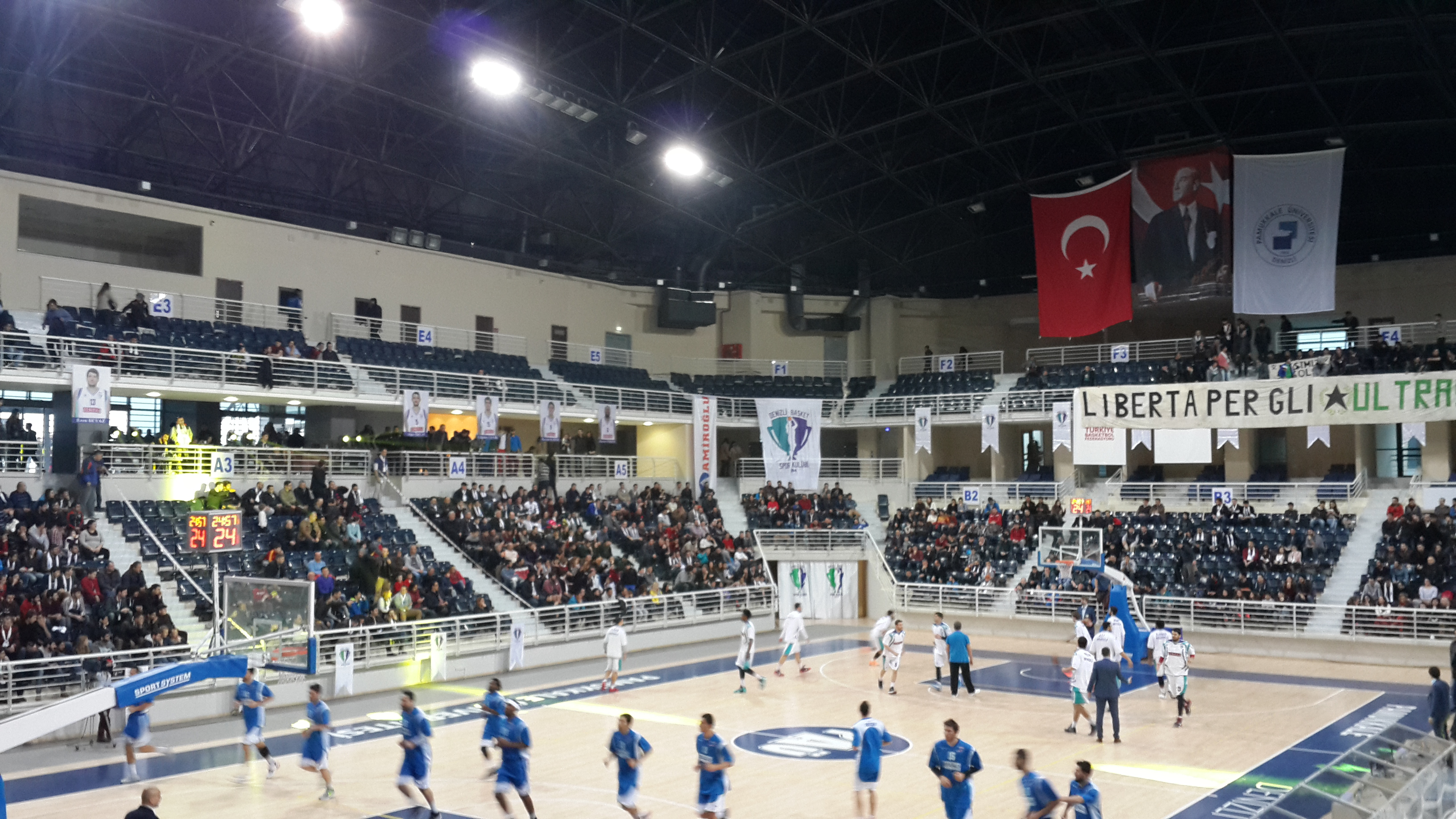

== See also ==
- List of indoor arenas in Turkey
