= Laodicea on the Lycus =

Ancient town in Phrygia, Asia Minor

- Λαοδίκεια πρὸς τοῦ Λύκου (in Greek); Laodikeia or Lâdik (in Turkish)
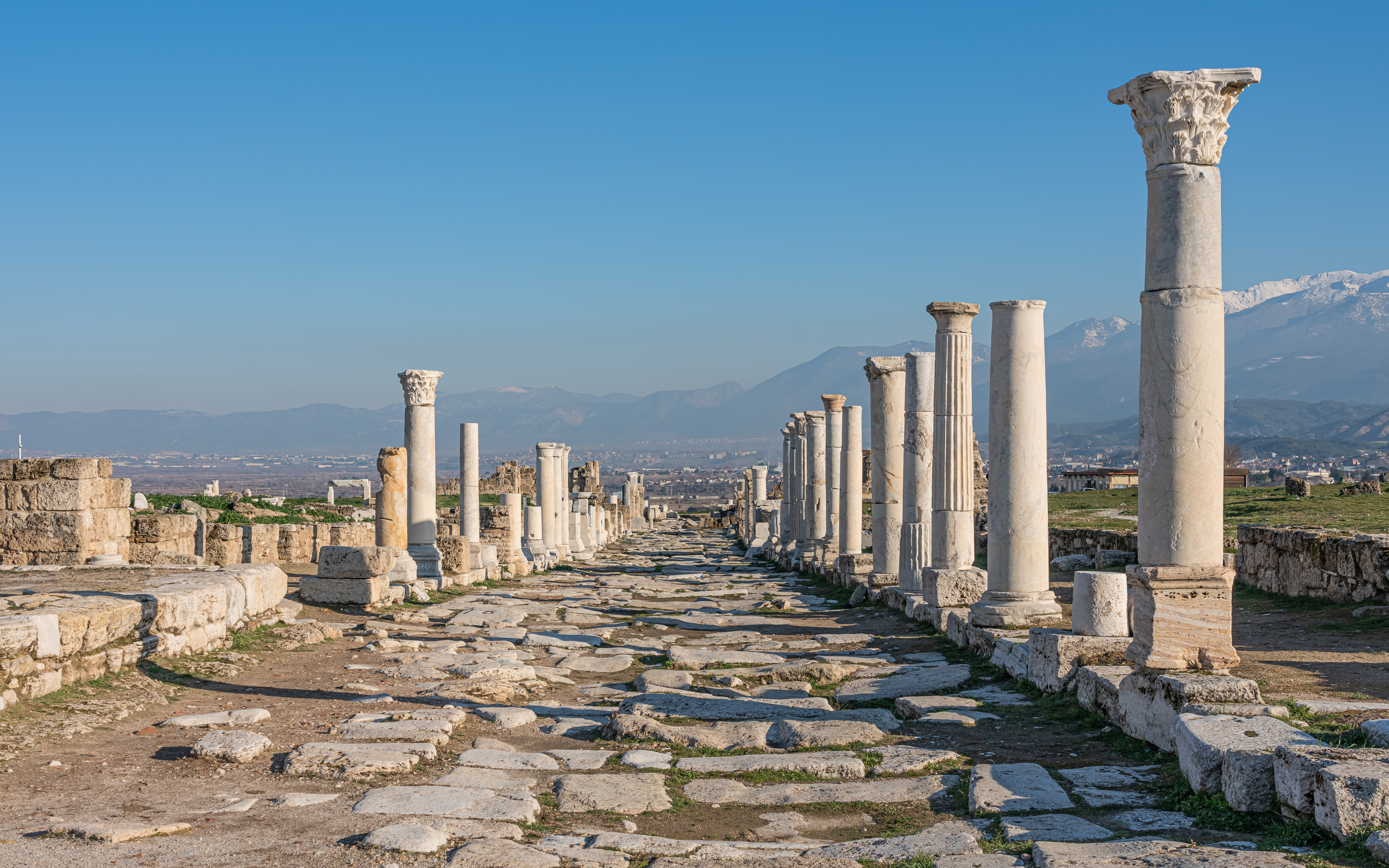
- Colonnaded street in Laodicea

- Location within Turkey
- 37°50′09″N 29°06′27″E
- Type: Settlement
- Location: Eskihisar, Denizli Province, Turkey
- Region: Phrygia

Laodicea on the Lycus (Greek: Λαοδίκεια πρὸς τοῦ Λύκου Laodikeia pros tou Lykou; Latin: Laodicea ad Lycum, also transliterated as Laodiceia or Laodikeia) (Turkish: Laodikeia or archaically as Lâdik), earlier Diospolis and Rhoas, was a rich ancient Greek city in Asia Minor, now Turkey, on the river Lycus (Çürüksu). It was located in the Hellenistic regions of Caria and Lydia, which later became the Roman Province of Phrygia Pacatiana. Its ruins are located near the modern city of Denizli, Turkey.

Since 2002, Pamukkale University has continued archaeological excavations, followed by intensive restoration work.

In 2013 the archaeological site was inscribed in the Tentative List of World Heritage Sites in Turkey.

It contained one of the Seven churches of Asia mentioned in the Book of Revelation.

== Location ==
Laodicea is situated on the long spur of a hill between the narrow valleys of the small rivers Asopus and Caprus, which discharge their waters into the Lycus.

It lay on a major trade route and in its neighbourhood were many important ancient cities; it was 17 kilometres (11 mi) west of Colossae, 10 kilometres (6.2 mi) south of Hierapolis, and 160 kilometres (99 mi) east of Ephesus. It was situated in the ancient region of Phrygia, although some ancient authors place Laodicea in differing provincial territories, not surprising because the precise limits of these territories were both ill-defined and inconstant; for example, Ptolemy and Philostratus call it a town of Caria, while Stephanus of Byzantium describes it as belonging to Lydia.

== History ==
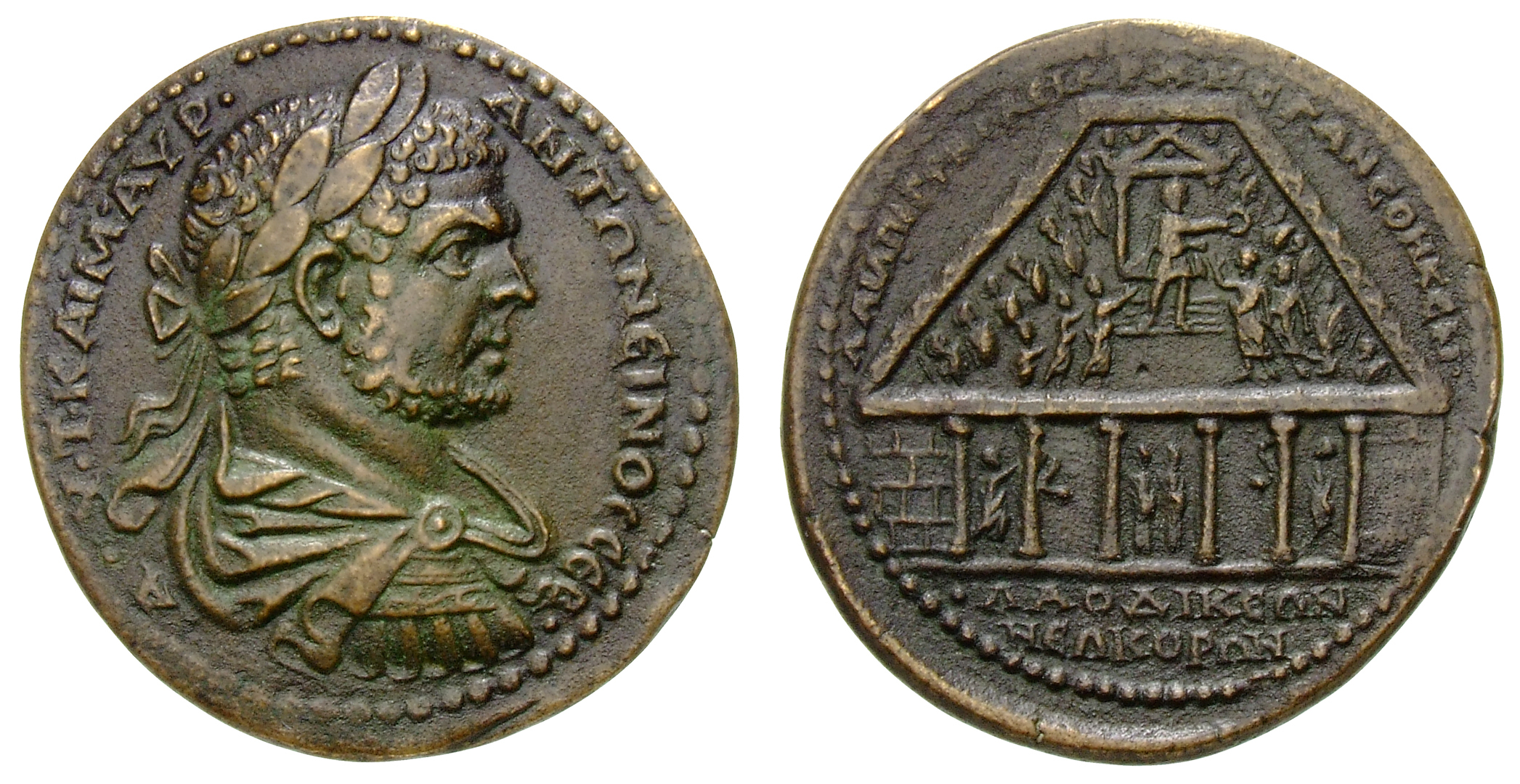
Bronze Roman medal (45 mm, 45.6 g) showing Caracalla's portrait and the emperor being greeted by city's citizens in the Agora during his visit to Laodicea ad Lycum (216/217 AD), in front of a two-columned temple with soldiers lined up on both sides.

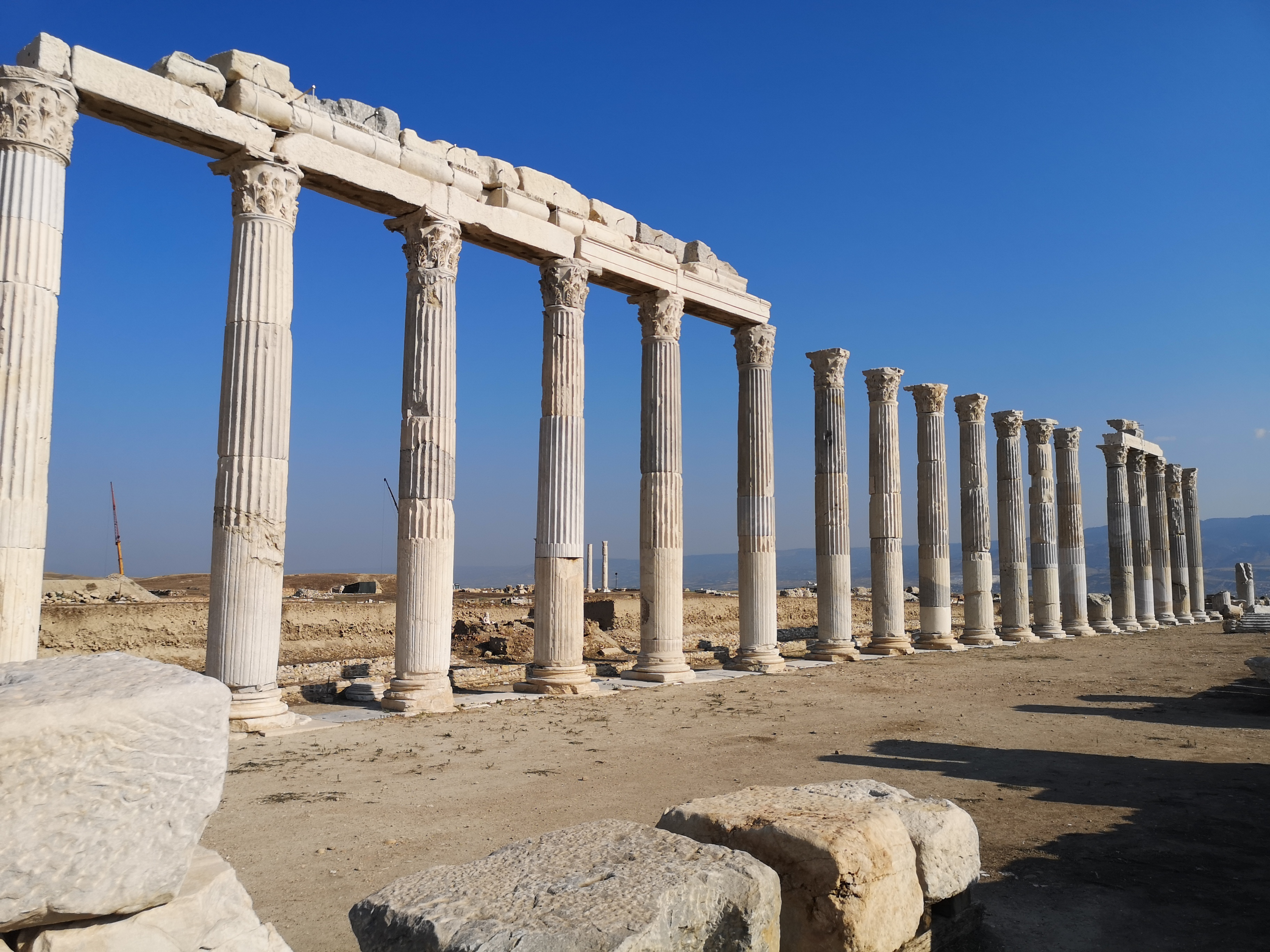
Side of West Agora

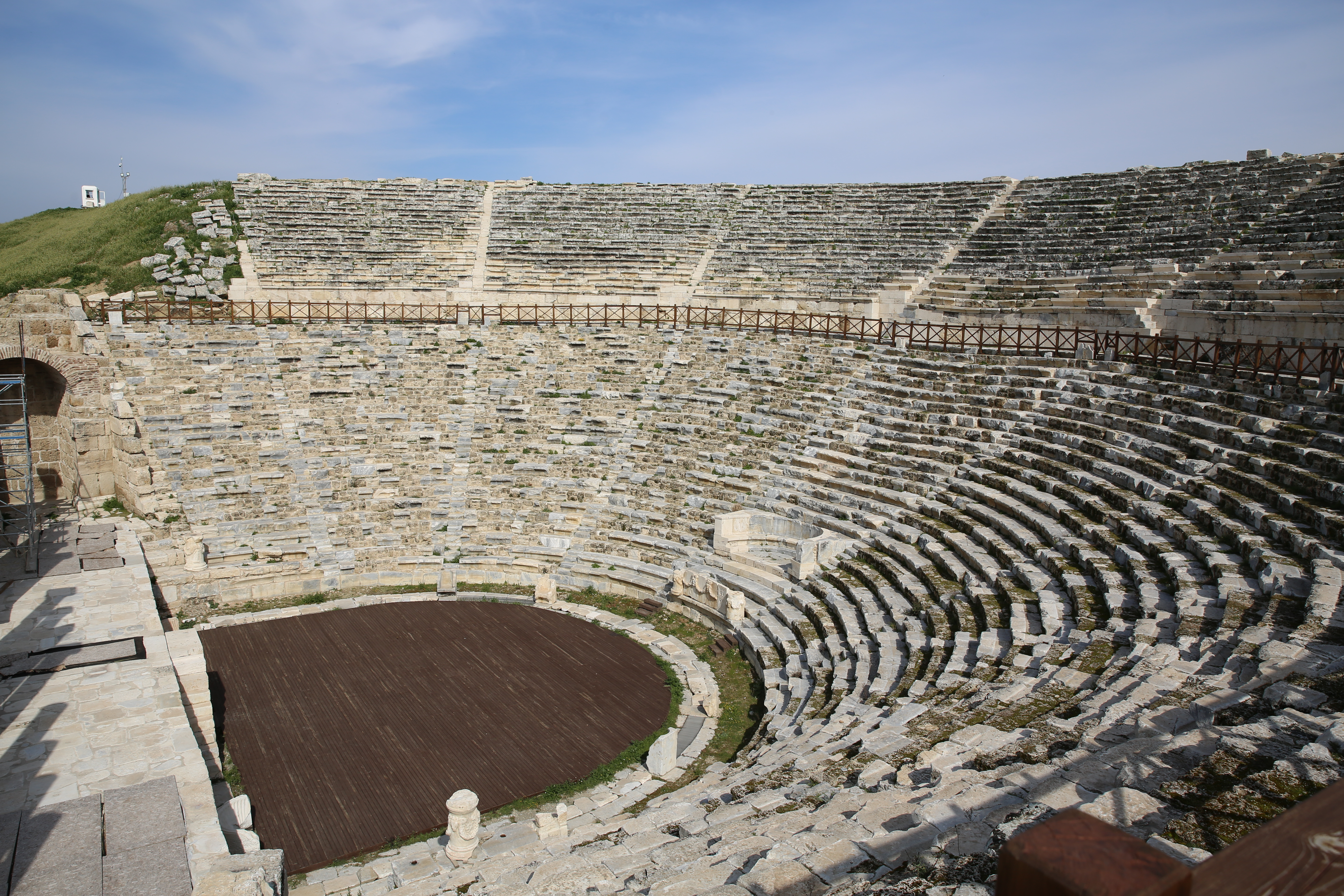
Western Theatre, 2026

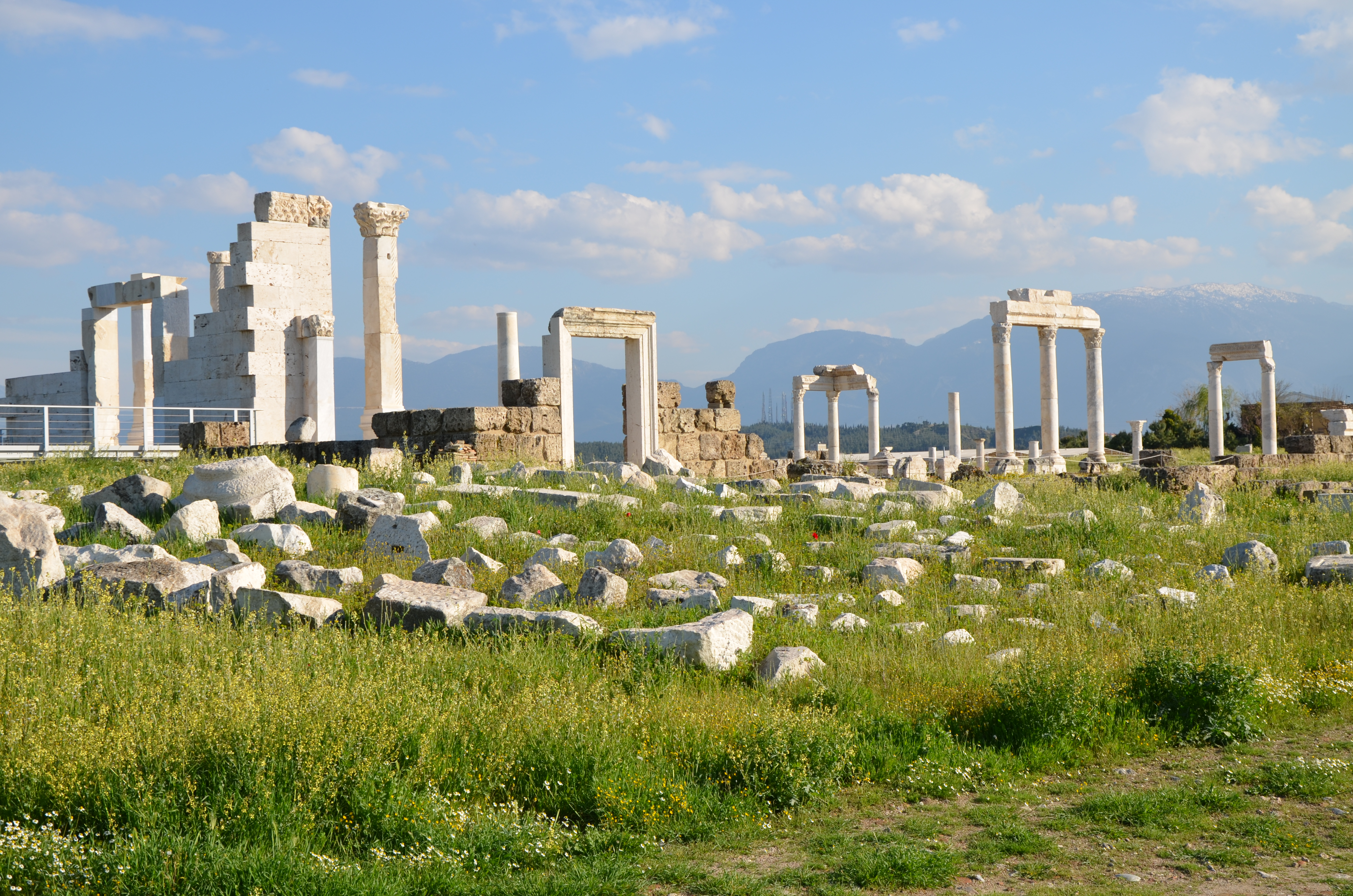
Temple 'A'

Laodicea on the Lycus was built on the site of an earlier pre-Hellenistic settlement, on a hill above the Lycus river, close to its confluence with the Maeander.

=== Classical Age ===
Laodicea was founded by Antiochus II Theos, king of the Seleucid Empire, in 261-253 BC in honour of his wife Laodice, together with several other cities of the same name. According to Pliny the Elder, the town was originally called Diospolis, "City of Zeus", and afterwards Rhoas. It soon became a wealthy city. In 220 BC, Achaeus declared himself king of the region but was defeated by Antiochus the Great in 213 BC. Antiochus transported 2,000 Jewish families to Phrygia from Babylonia.

After the Battle of Magnesia in 190 BC, when the Romans defeated the Seleucids, the Treaty of Apamea was signed, which gave control of the whole of western Asia Minor to the Kingdom of Pergamon. With the death of its last king, its territory was bequested to Rome in 133 BC. It received from Rome the title of free city. It suffered greatly during the Mithridatic Wars but quickly recovered under the dominion of Rome. Towards the end of the Roman Republic and under the first emperors, Laodicea benefitted from its advantageous position on a trade route and became one of the most important and flourishing commercial cities of Asia Minor, in which large money transactions and an extensive trade in black wool were carried out. Its renowned wealth is referred to in the Bible.

==== Roman period ====
During the Roman period, Laodicea was the chief city of a Roman conventus, which comprised 24 cities besides itself; Cicero records holding assizes there c. 50 BC. and that L. Valerius Flaccus of the ancient Roman plebeian family Fulvius later confiscated the considerable sum of 9 kilograms (20 lb) of gold, which was being sent annually to the Temple at Jerusalem.

Strabo (64 BC – 24 AD) attributes the celebrity of the city to the fertility of the soil and the wealth of some of its inhabitants, amongst whom may have been Hiero of Laodicea, who adorned the city with many beautiful buildings and bequeathed to it more than 2000 talents at his death.

The wealth of its inhabitants engendered a taste for the arts of the Greeks, as is manifest from its ruins, and that it contributed to the advancement of science and literature is attested by the names of the sceptics Antiochus and Theiodas, the successors of Aenesidemus (1st century BC), and by the existence of a great medical school. Its wealthy citizens embellished Laodicea with beautiful monuments. One of the chiefs of these citizens, Polemon (r. 37 BC - 8 AD), became King of Armenian Pontus (called after him "Polemoniacus") and of the coast round Trebizond. The city minted its own coins, the inscriptions of which show evidence of the worship of Zeus, Æsculapius, Apollo, and the emperors.

The area often suffered from earthquakes, especially from the great shock that occurred in the reign of Nero (60 AD) in which the town was completely destroyed. However, the inhabitants declined imperial assistance to rebuild and restore the city by their own means.

The martyrdom of Lulianos and Paphos is believed to have happened here.

=== Medieval Age ===
The Byzantine writers often mention Laodicea, especially in the time of the Komnenian emperors. In 1119, Emperor John II Komnenos and his chief military commander, John Axouch, captured Laodicea from the Seljuk Turks in the first major military victory of his reign. Laodicea lacked defences and so was fortified by the Emperor Manuel I Komnenos in 1160. The city was sacked by the Seljuks in 1161 and much of its population was enslaved. It was raided again a few years later, when the Seljuks took many captives and much of the livestock. In 1206–1230, it was ruled by Manuel Maurozomes. In 1257 Laodicea (along with Chonae and the two fortresses of Sakaina and Ypsele) were given to the Empire of Nicaea by Sultan Kaykaus II in exchange for support in regaining Iconium, but only a few years later the city was captured again by Turkomans. Laodicea was destroyed during the invasions of the Turks and Mongols.

== Christianity at Laodicea ==
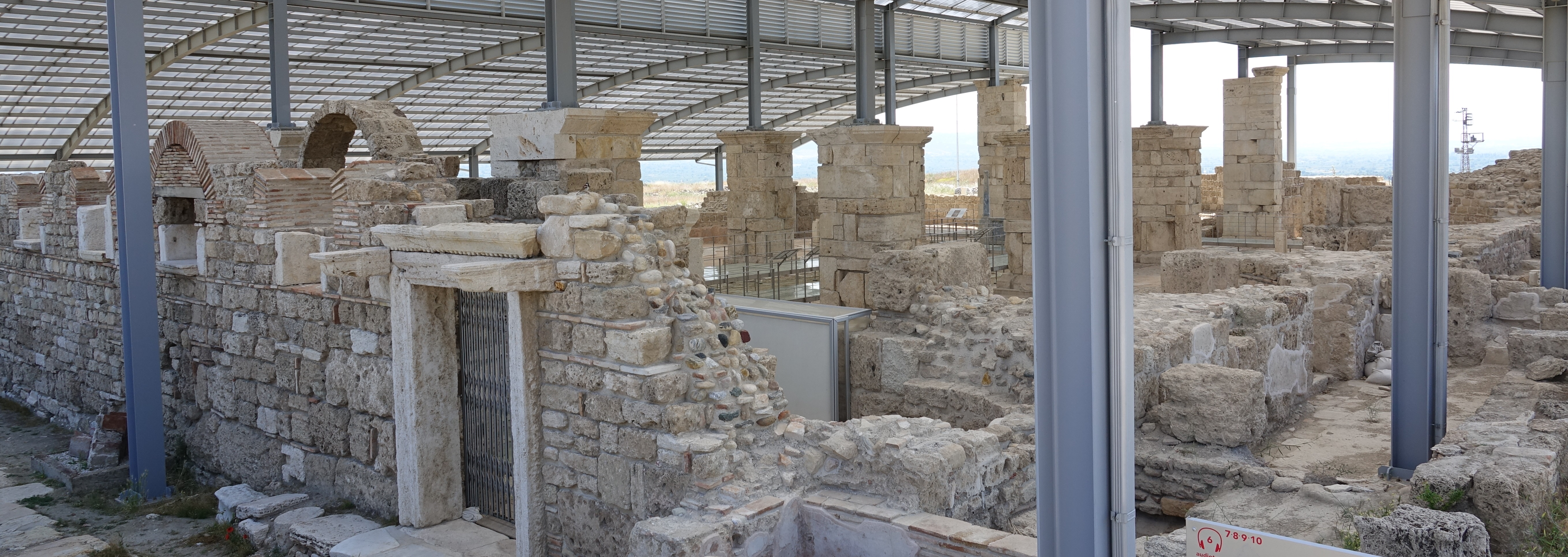
The Church of Laodicea

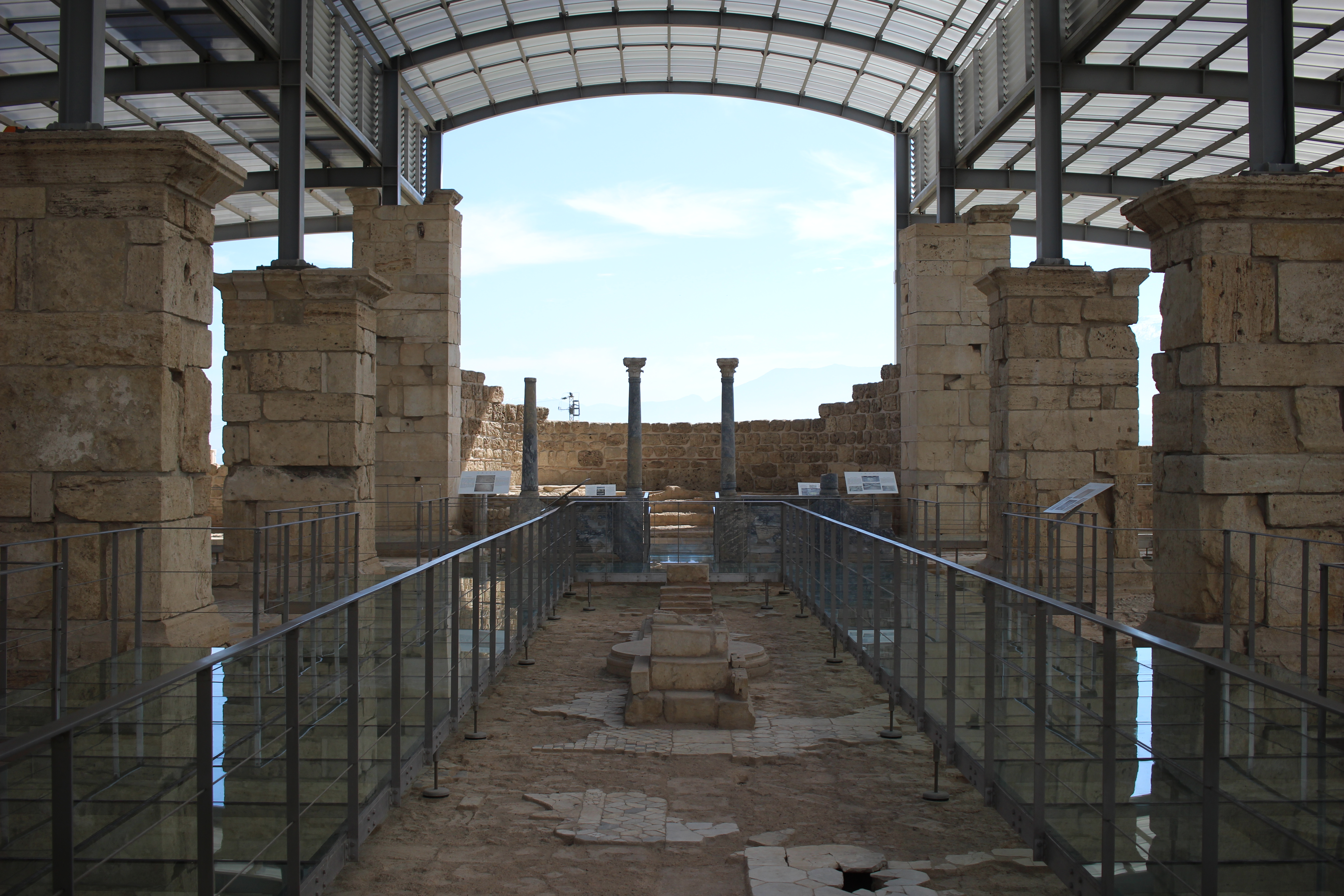
Inside the Church

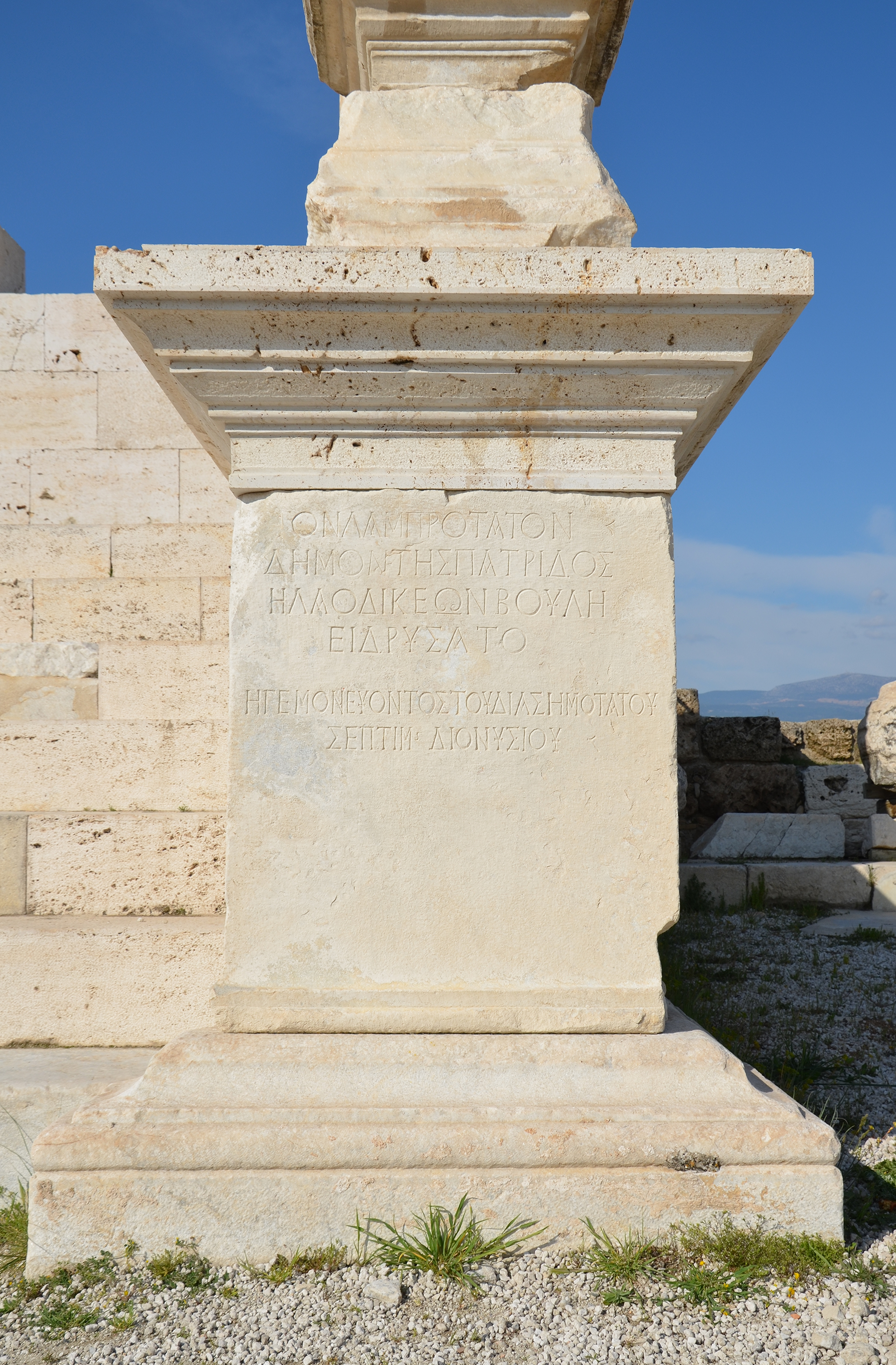
Honorific inscription "The council of the Laodiceans recognized and proclaimed him the most illustrious citizen of his homeland, during the governorship of the most distinguished Septimius Dionysius."

With its large Jewish community, Laodicea very early became a seat of Christianity and a bishopric. The Epistle to the Colossians mentions Laodicea as one of the communities of concern for Paul the Apostle. It sends greetings from a certain Epaphras from Colossae, who worked hard for the Christians of the three Phrygian cities of Colossae, Laodicea ad Lycum and Hierapolis. Asking for greetings to be sent to the Laodicean Christians, the writer requests that his letter be read publicly at Laodicea (Colossians 4:16) and that another letter addressed to the Laodiceans (see Epistle to the Laodiceans) be given a public reading at Colossae. Some Greek manuscripts of the First Epistle to Timothy end with the words: "Written at Laodicea, metropolis of Phrygia Pacatiana". Laodicea is also one of the seven churches of Asia mentioned in the Book of Revelation.

The first three bishops attributed to the see of Laodicea are very uncertain, their names recalling people mentioned in the New Testament: Archippus (Colossians 4:17); Nymphas, already indicated as bishop of Laodicea by the Apostolic Constitutions of the last quarter of the 4th century (a man named Nymphas or, according to the best manuscripts, a woman named Nympha is mentioned in Colossians 4:15); and Diotrephes (3 John 9). After these three comes Sagaris, martyr (c. 166). Sisinnius is mentioned in the Acts of the martyr Saint Artemon, a priest of his church. Nunechius assisted at the Council of Nicaea (325). Eugenius, known by an inscription, was probably his successor. Constantius transferred the Arian Cecropius to the See of Nicomedia.

When Phrygia was divided into two provinces, Laodicea became the metropolis of Phrygia Pacatiana: it figures under this title in all the Notitiae Episcopatuum. In 1384 Laodicea assumed the metropolitanates of Chonae, Kotyaion, Kolis and the patriarchal possessions of Koula, due to their decline because of the threat posed by the Anatolian Beyliks, until 1394 (except for Chonae, which it kept). Some twenty incumbents are known besides those already enumerated; the last occupied the see in 1450. Since then, the bishopric has become a titular see, listed as Laodicea in Phrygia by the Catholic Church, which has appointed no further titular bishops to the see since the transfer of the last incumbent in 1968.

Sixty canons of a Council of Laodicea, written in Greek, exist. The testimony of Theodoret asserts this assembly was actually held, the date of this assembly being much discussed. Some have even thought that the council must have preceded that of Nicaea (325), or at least that of Constantinople (381). It seems safer to consider it after the latter. The canons are, undoubtedly, only a resume of an older text and appear to be derived from two distinct collections. They are of great importance in the history of discipline and liturgy; some Protestants have invoked one of them in opposition to the veneration of angels.

== Archaeology ==
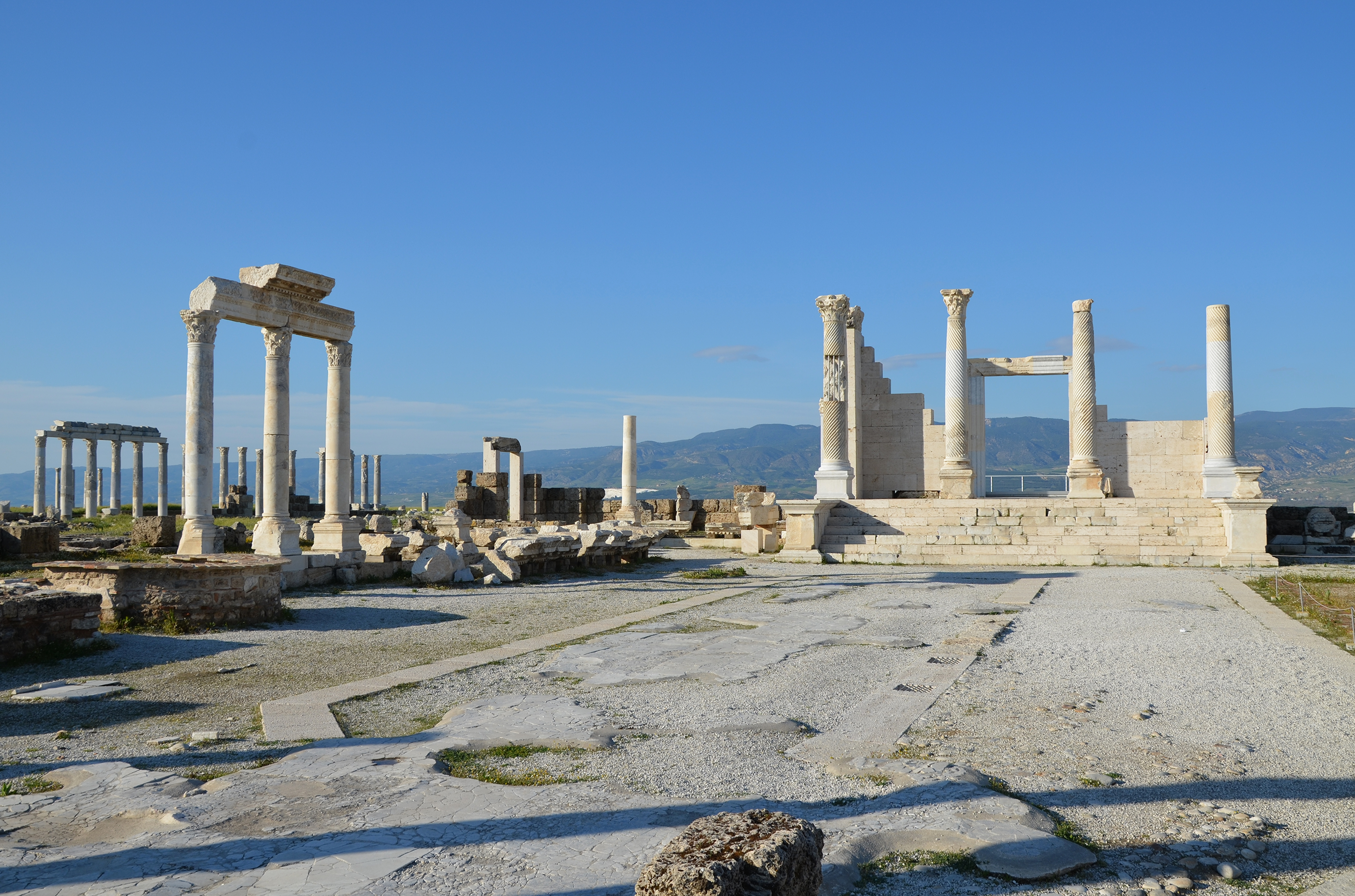
Temple "A"

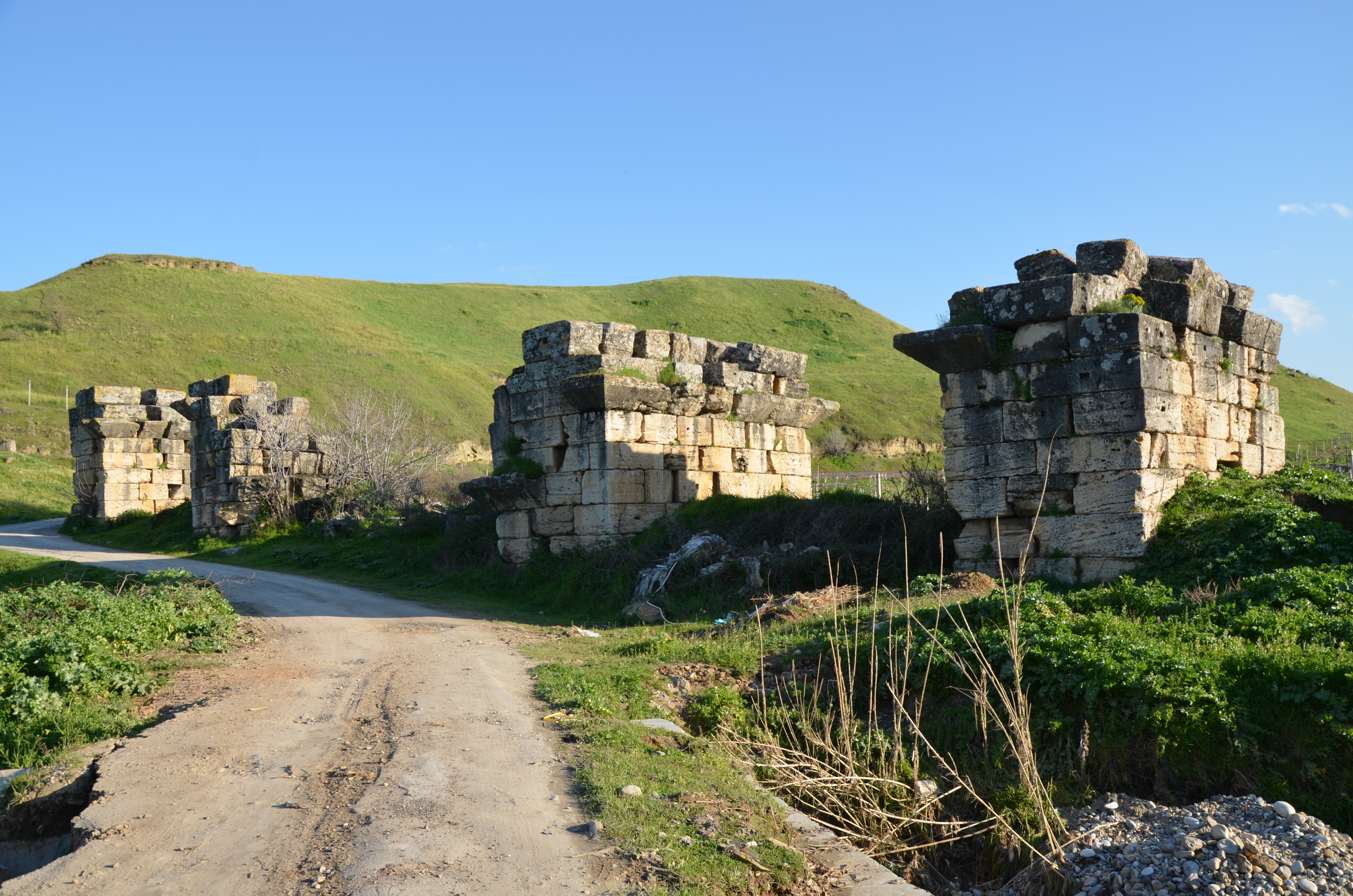
Roman bridge over the Asopos river near the site

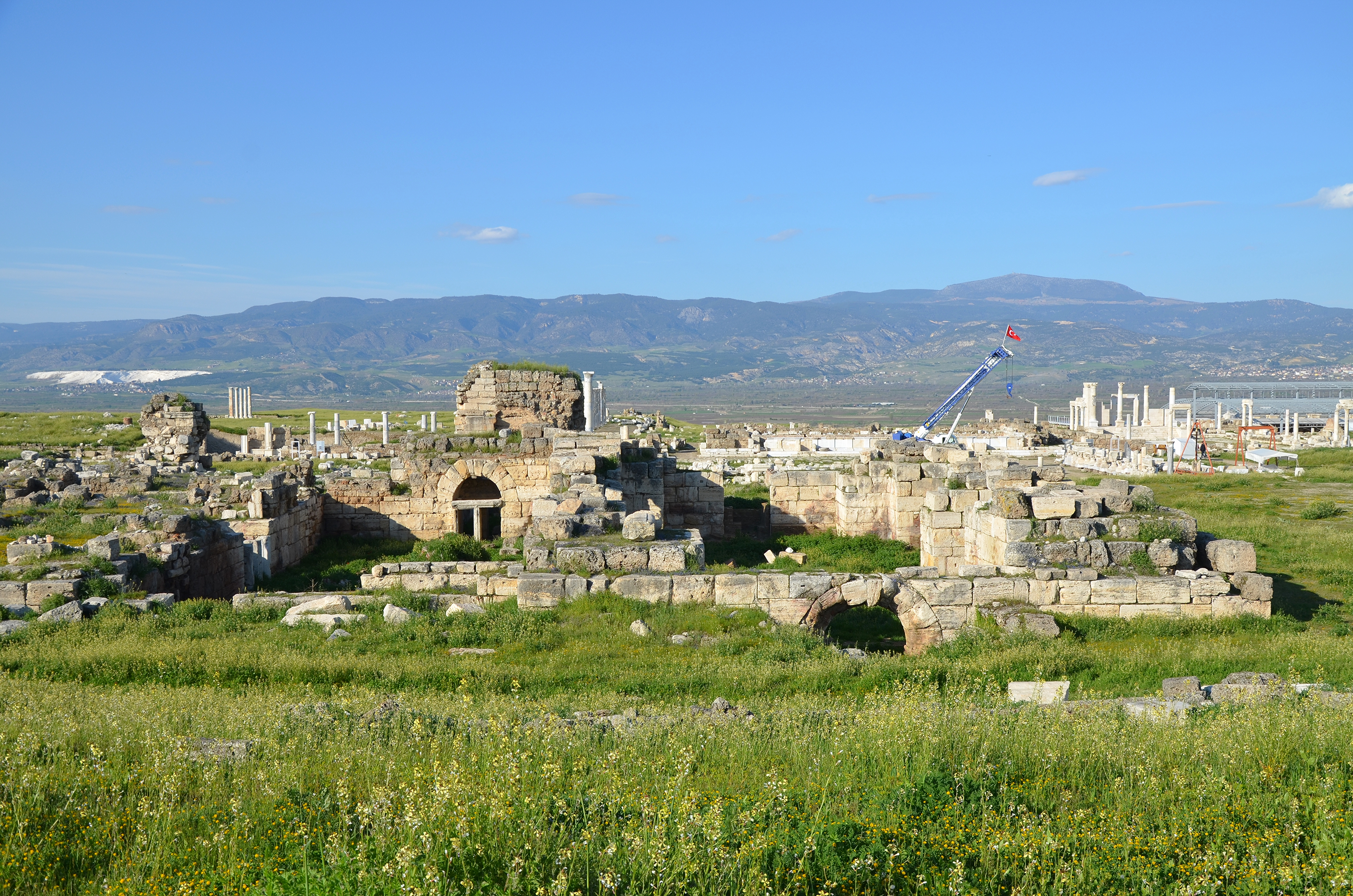
West Baths

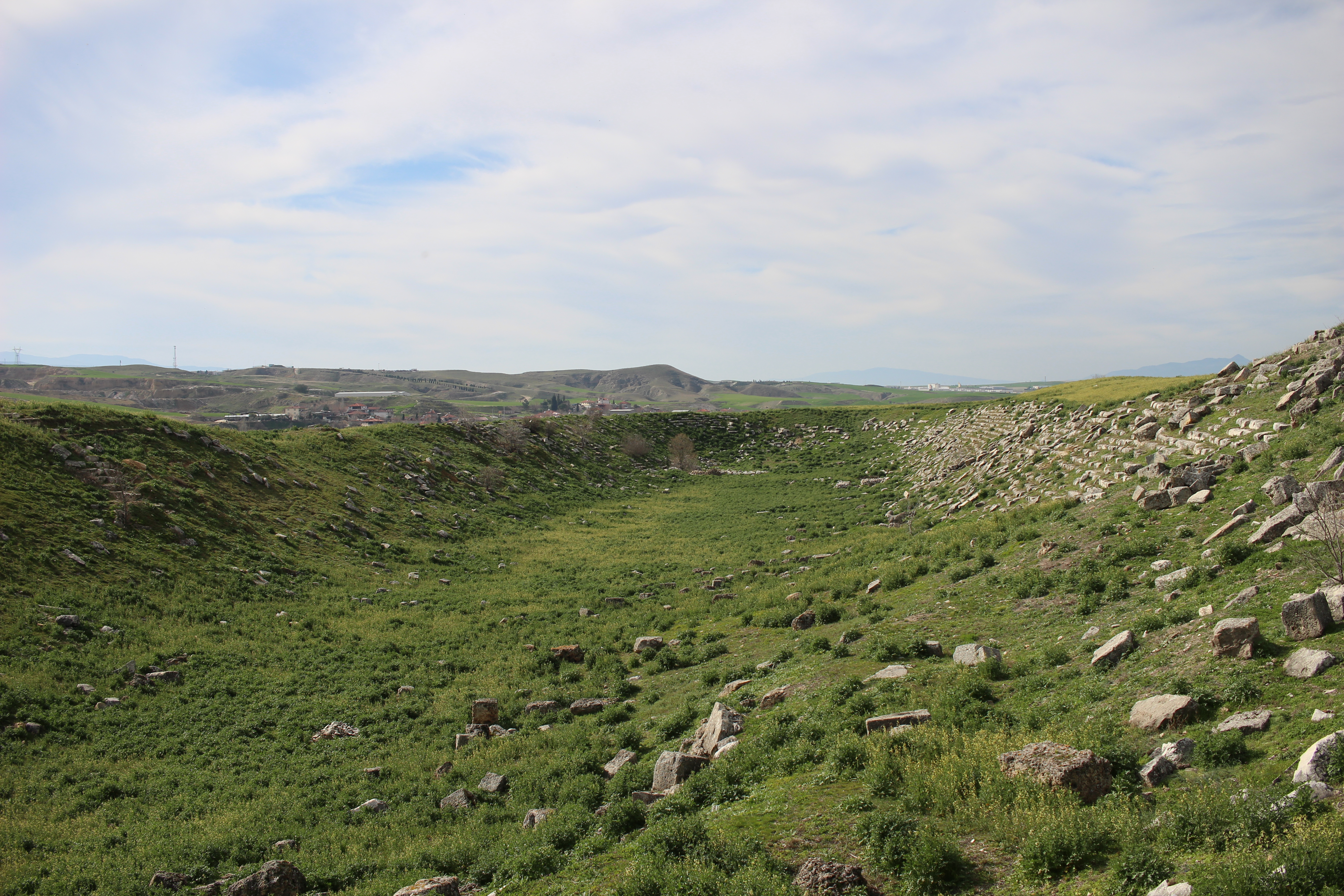
Stadium of Laodicea

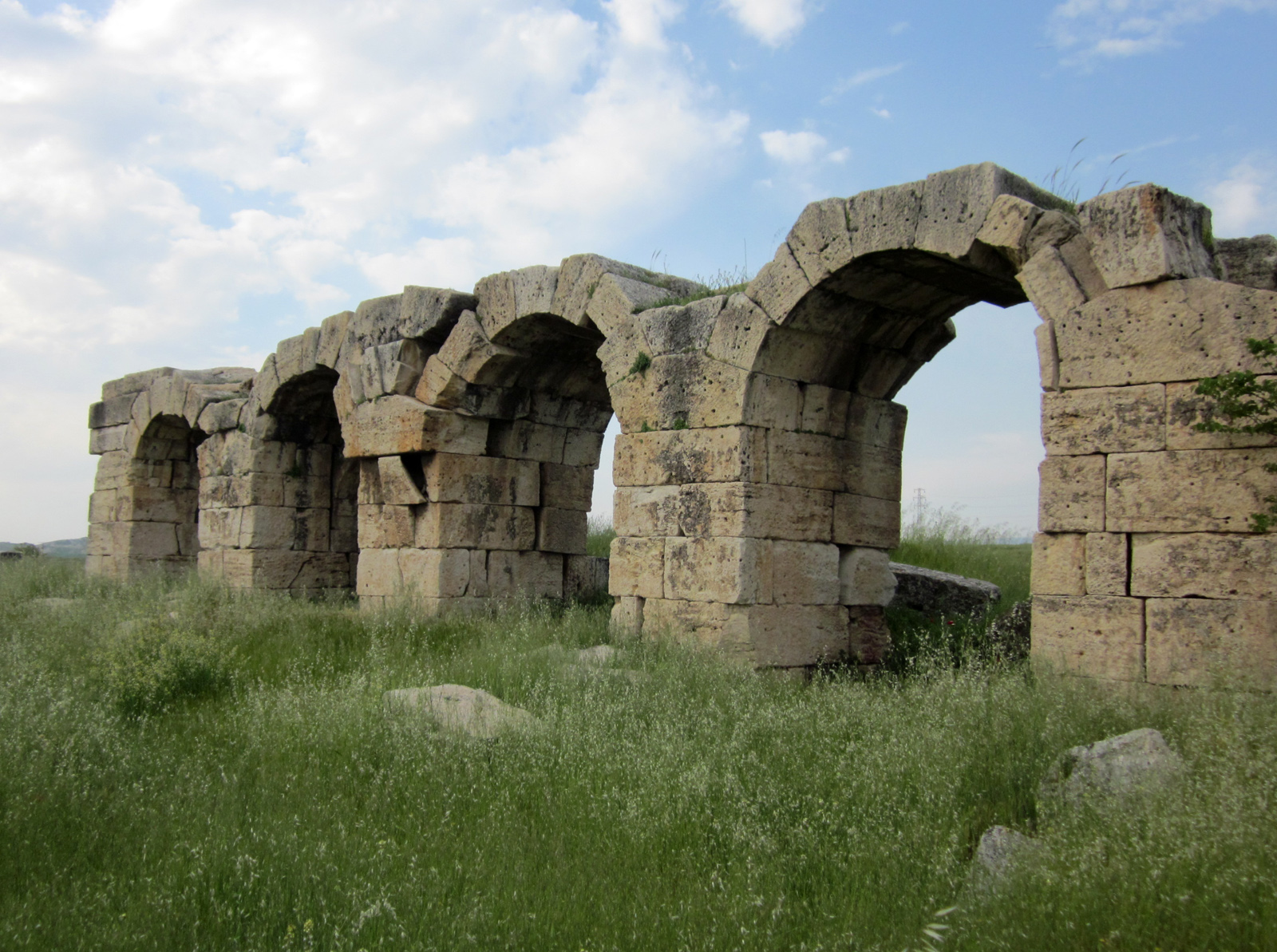
Baths of the Gymnasium

The existing remains attest to its former greatness. Its many buildings include a stadium, baths, temples, a gymnasium, two theatres and a bouleuterion (Senate House). On the eastern side, the line of the ancient wall may be distinctly traced, with the Ephesus gate's remains; streets traverse the town, flanked by colonnades and numerous pedestals. North of the town, towards the Lycus, are many sarcophagi, with their covers lying near them, partly embedded in the ground, and all having long been rifled.

The West theatre has been recently restored (2022) with virtually complete banks of stone seats. Originally built in the Hellenistic period, it held 8000 spectators and was used until the 7th c. AD.

Also, much of the vast 35,000 m^{2} west (or central) agora has been restored with many of its tall 10.8 m columns. The 100 m long and 11 m high back wall is covered with frescoes and is considered important for world archaeology.

Particularly interesting are the remains of an aqueduct starting several km away at the Baspinar spring in Denizli and possibly having another more distant source. Unusually, to cross the valley to the south of Laodicea, instead of the usual open channel carried above the level of the city on lofty arches as was the usual practice of the Romans, an inverted siphon was employed consisting of a double pressurised pipeline, descending into the valley and back up to the city. The water pressure in the siphon at the bottom of the valley was a challenge without strong piping. The low arches supporting the siphon commence near the summit of a low hill to the south of the city where the header tank was located and thence continue to the first terminal distribution tank (castellum aquae) at the edge of the hill of the city, whose remains are visible to the east of the stadium and South Baths complex. The water was heavily charged with calcareous matter, as several arches were covered with a thick encrustation where leaks occurred later. The siphon consisted of large carved stone pipes; some were much incrusted, and some completely choked up. The terminal tank has many clay pipes of various diameters for water distribution on the north, east, and south sides, which were replaced in time because of the choking by sinter. To the west of the terminal is a small fountain next to the vaulted gate. The aqueduct appears to have been destroyed by an earthquake, as the remaining arches lean bodily on one side without being much broken. A second distribution terminal and sedimentation tank are visible 400 m north of the first, to which it was connected via another siphon of travertine blocks, and this one was bigger and supplied most of the city.

In 2015, a rare marble block was found with the inscription of the water law. Issued in 114 AD, it regulated the use of water imported from the mountains to Laodicea on pain of 5 to 12.5 thousand denarii fines imposed for polluting water, destroying channels, or opening water pipes.

The stadium/hippodrome near the city's southern extremity is in a good state of preservation. The seats are arranged along two sides of a narrow valley, which was taken advantage of for this purpose and was closed up at both ends. Towards the west are considerable remains of an underground passage by which chariots and horses could be admitted into the arena, with a long inscription over the entrance.

Immediately north of the stadium lies a gymnasium complex coupled with twin baths peculiar to the region. It is linked to the south agora on its north side and a bouleuterion. An inscription shows the ensemble was built for Hadrian's visit in 135.

In 2019 a statue of Roman emperor Trajan was unearthed at the site.

== Gallery ==
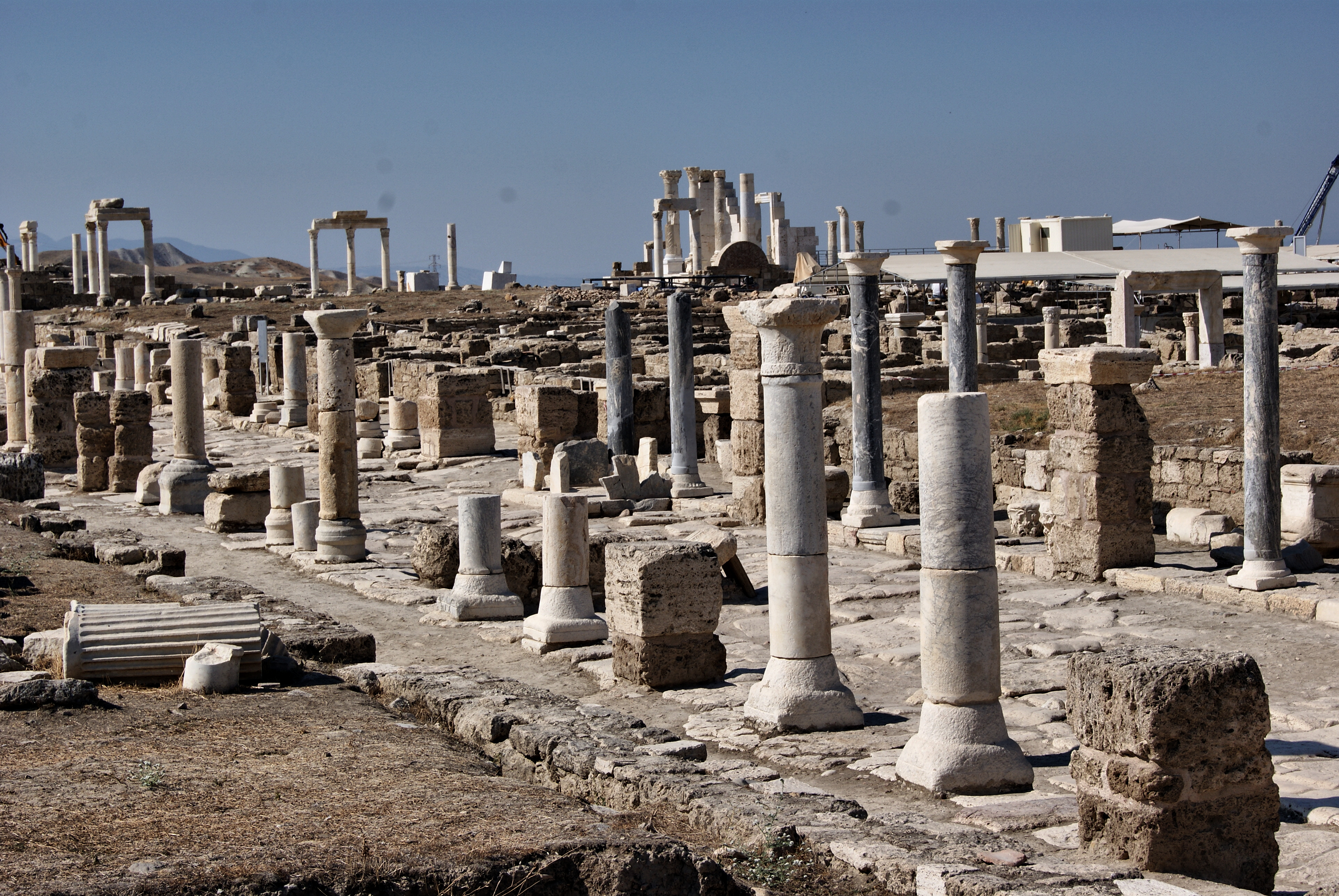

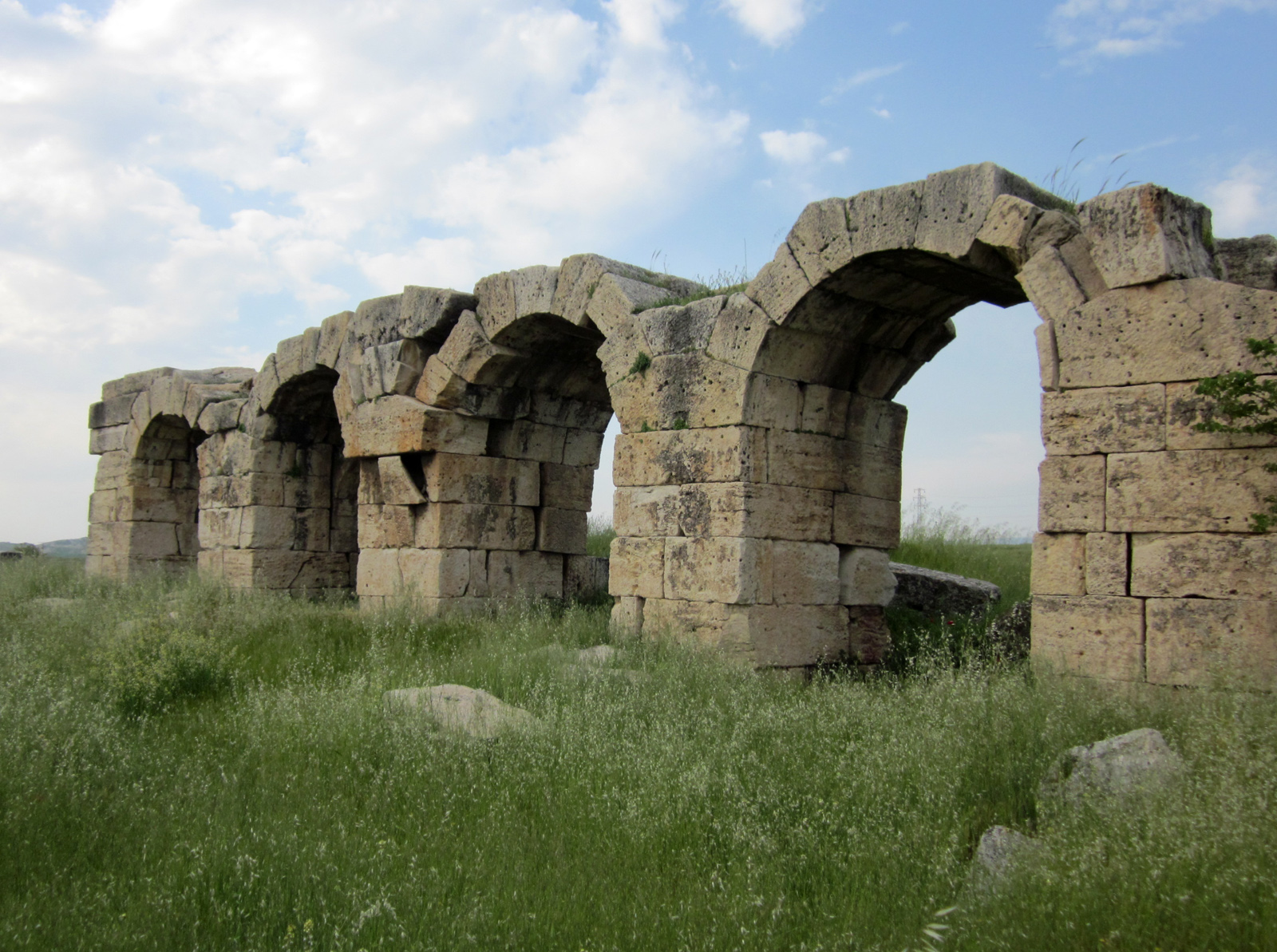

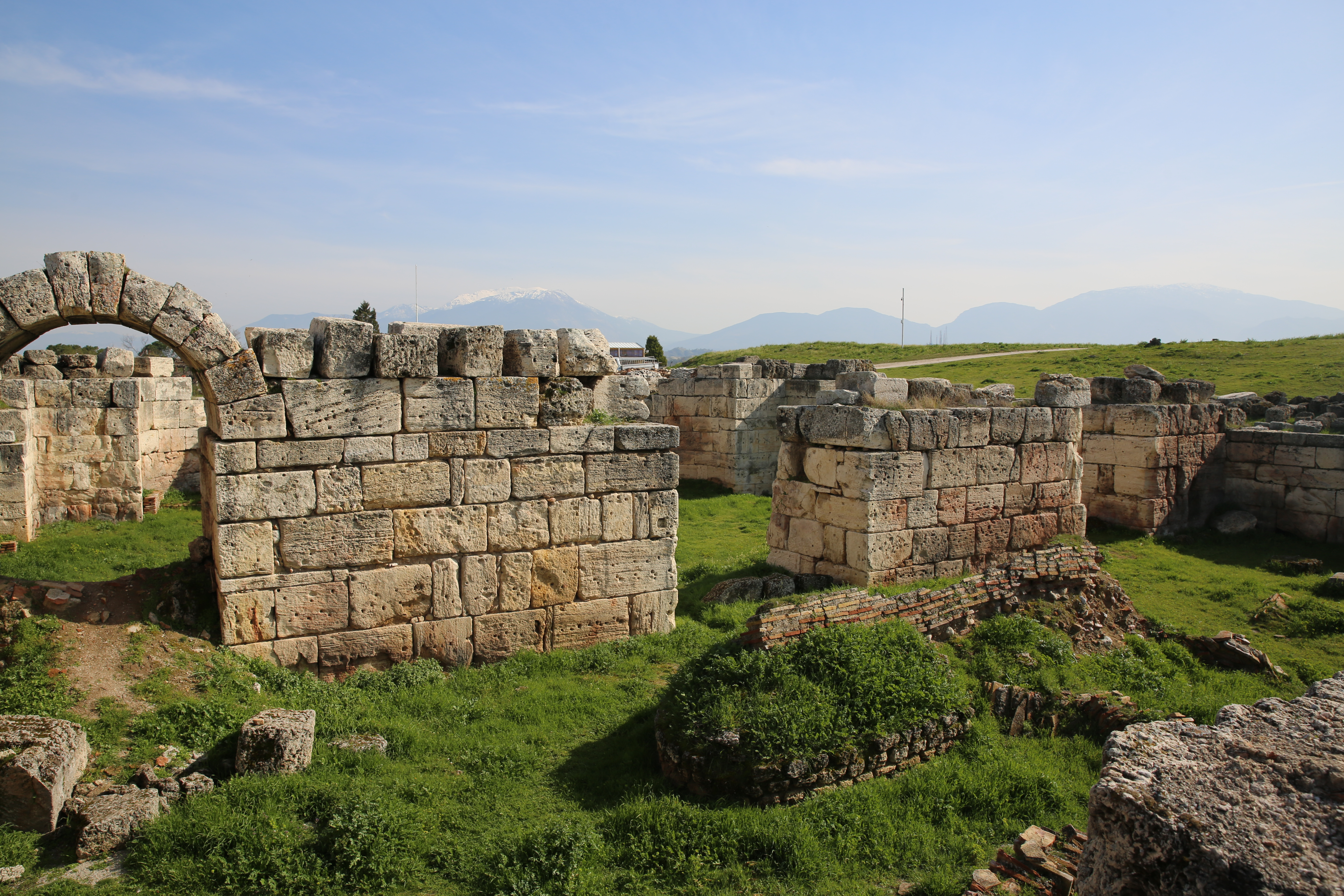

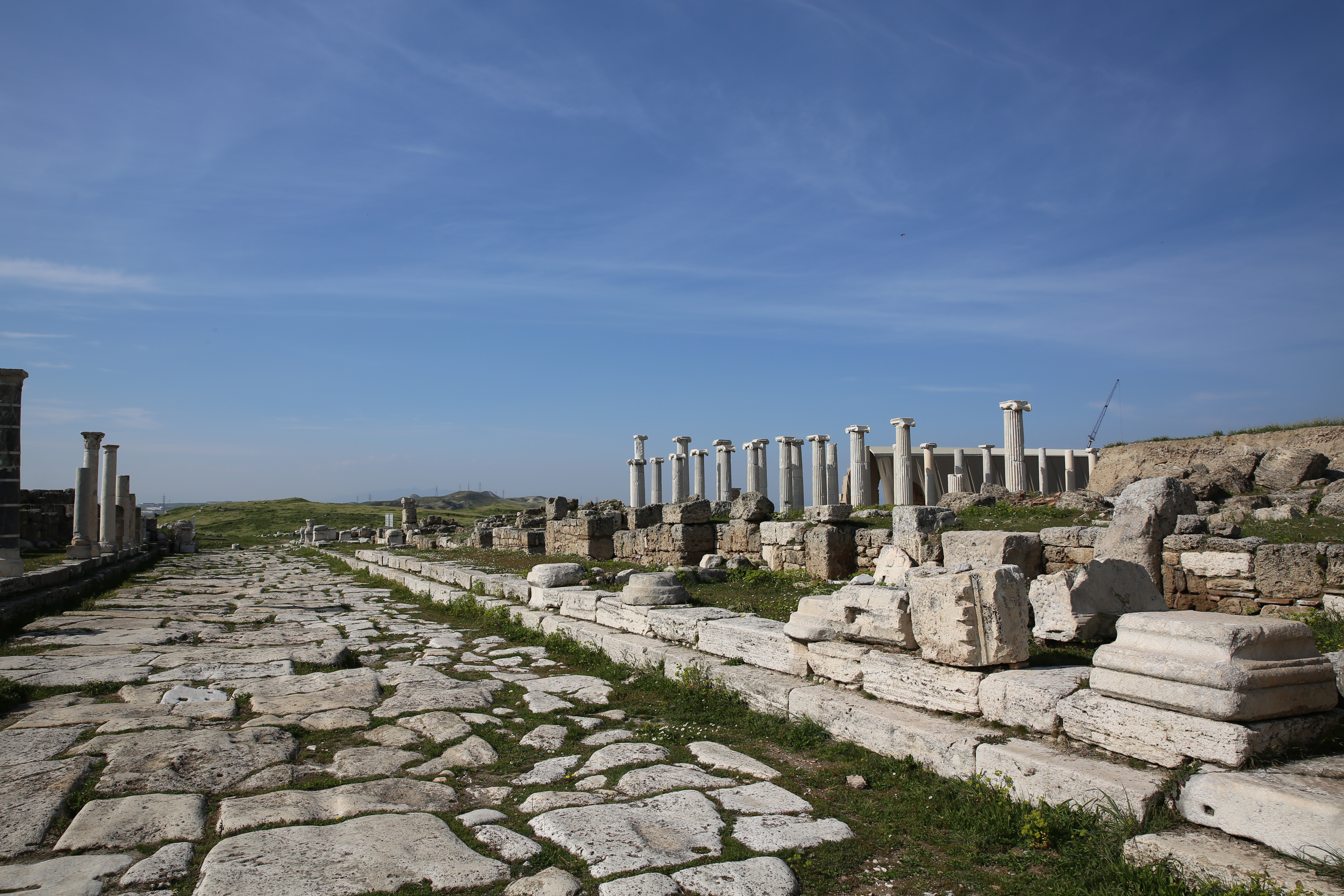

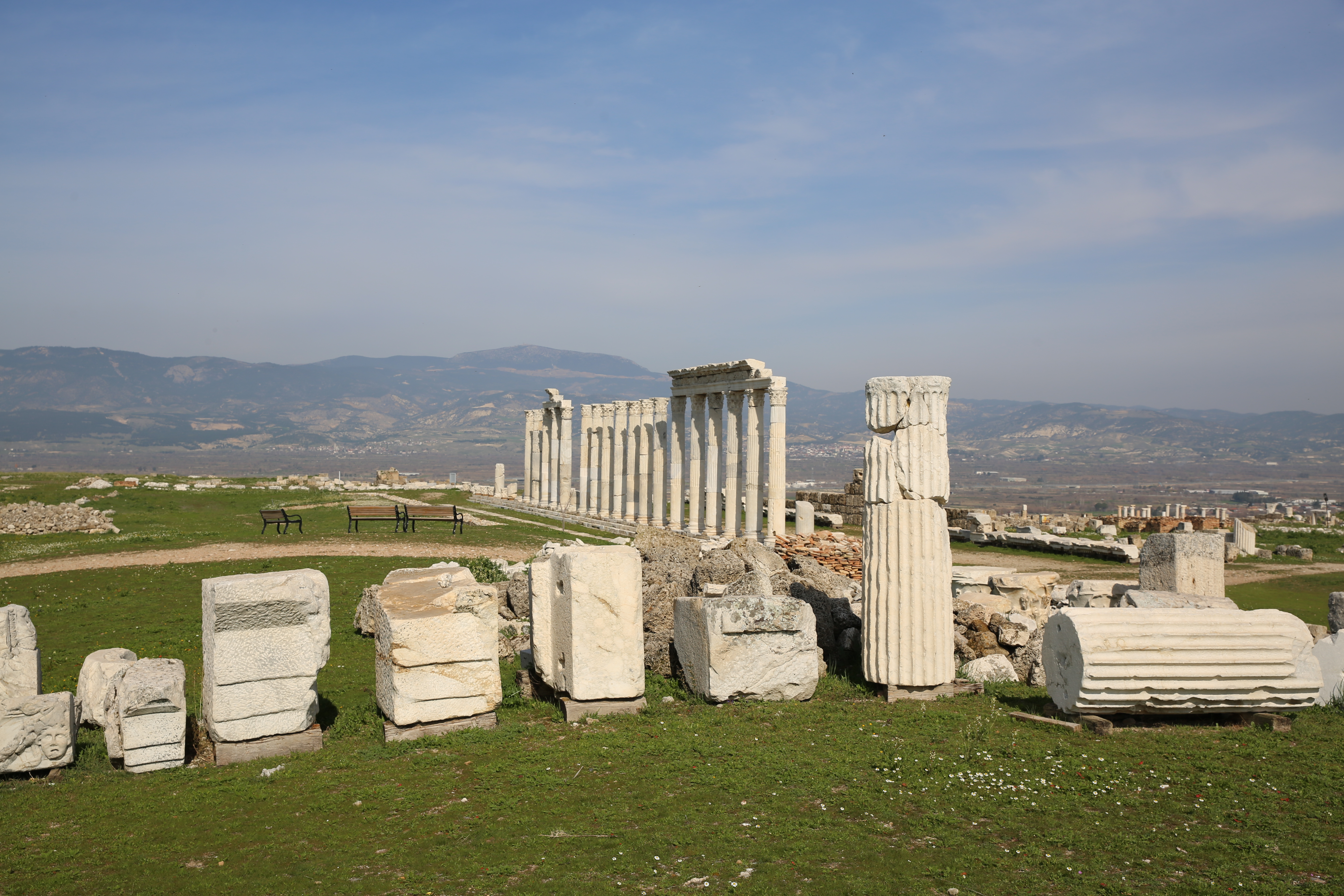

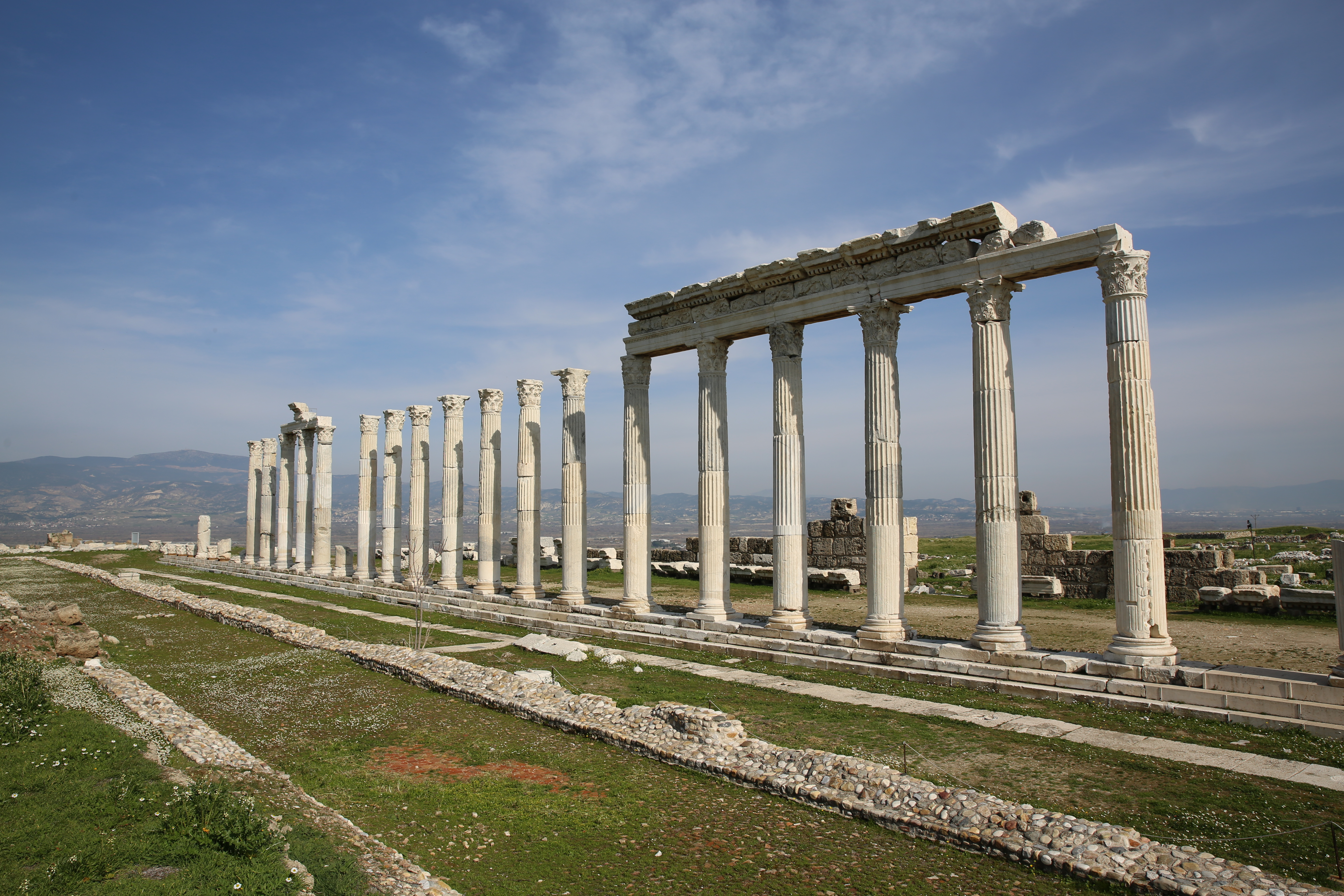

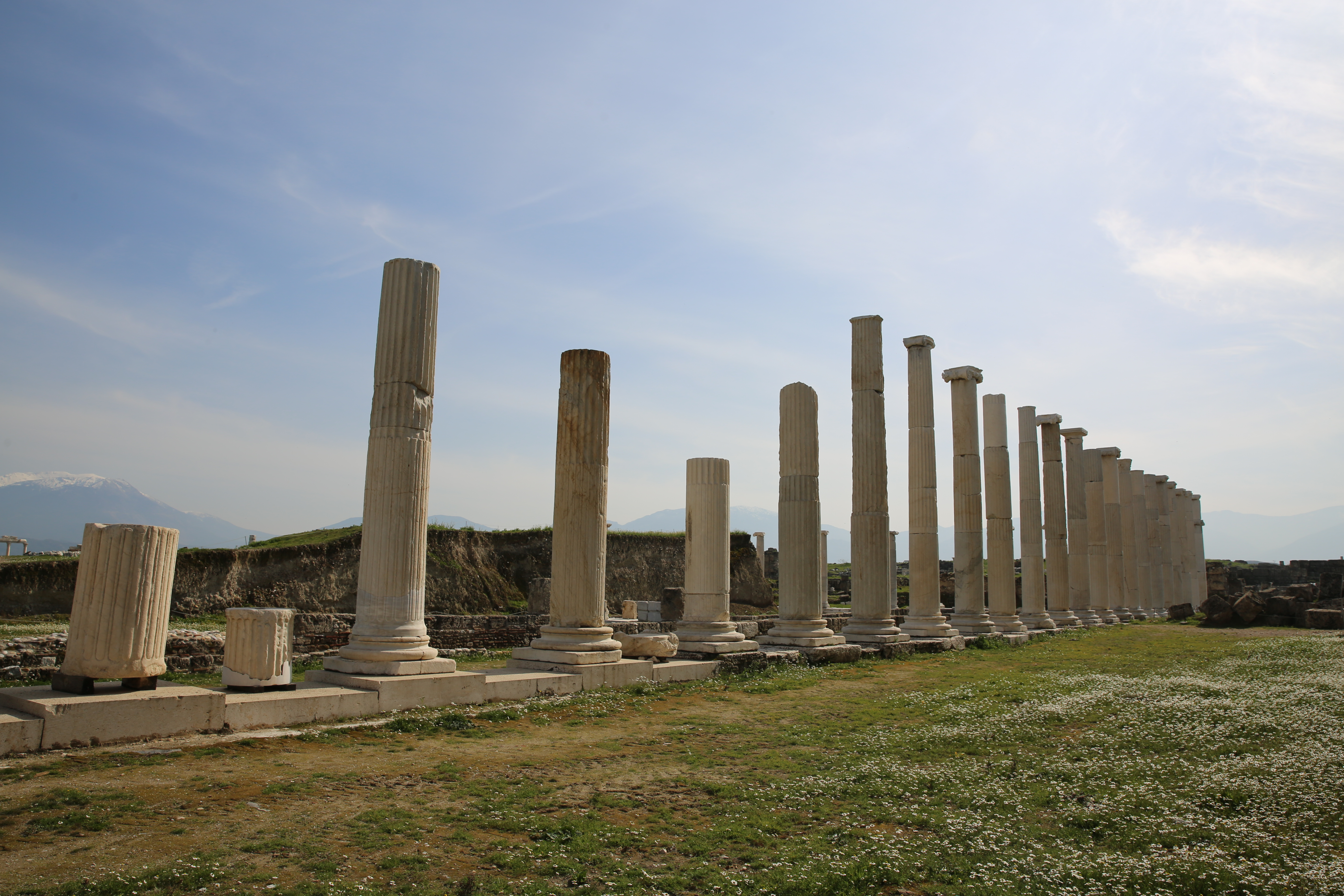

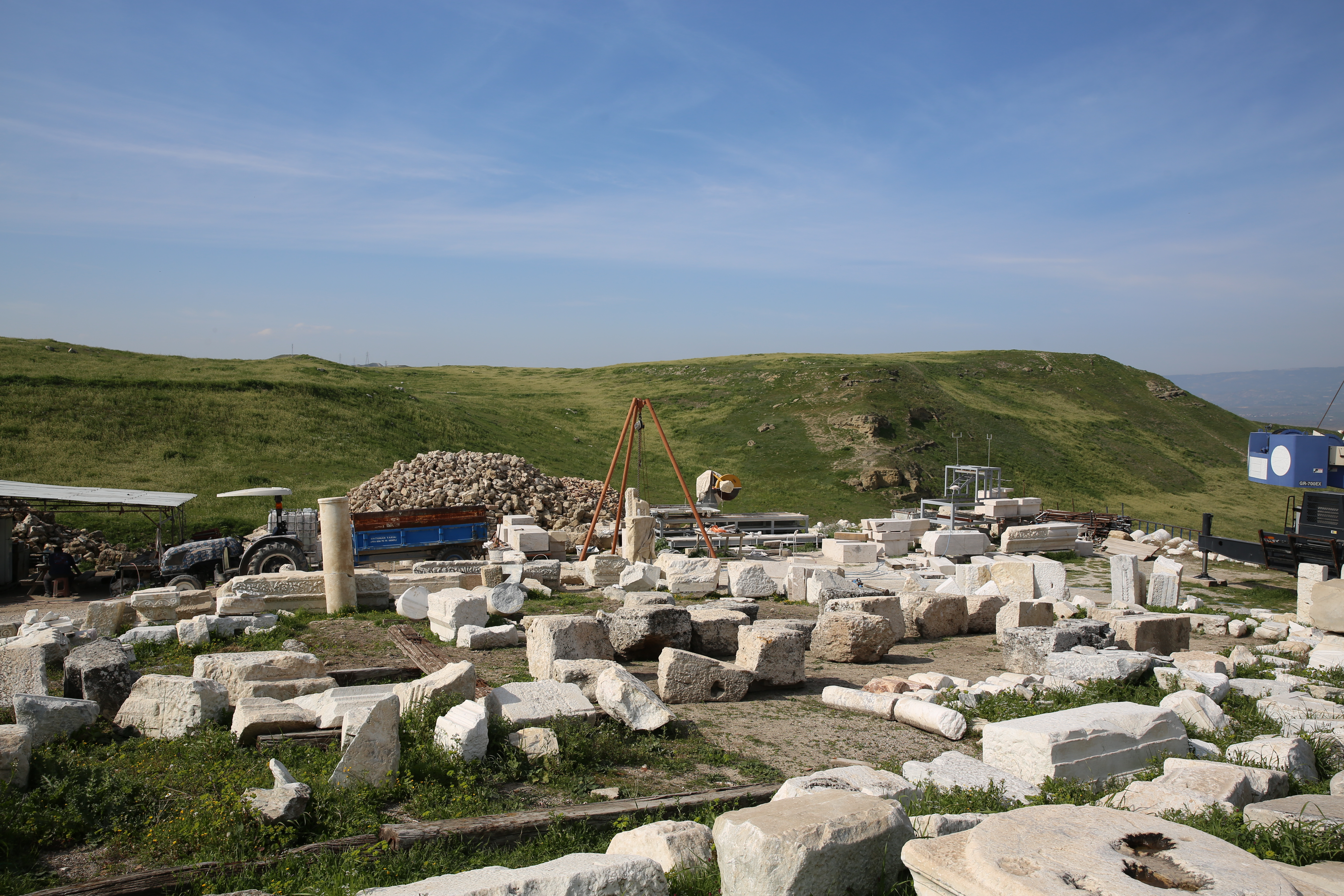

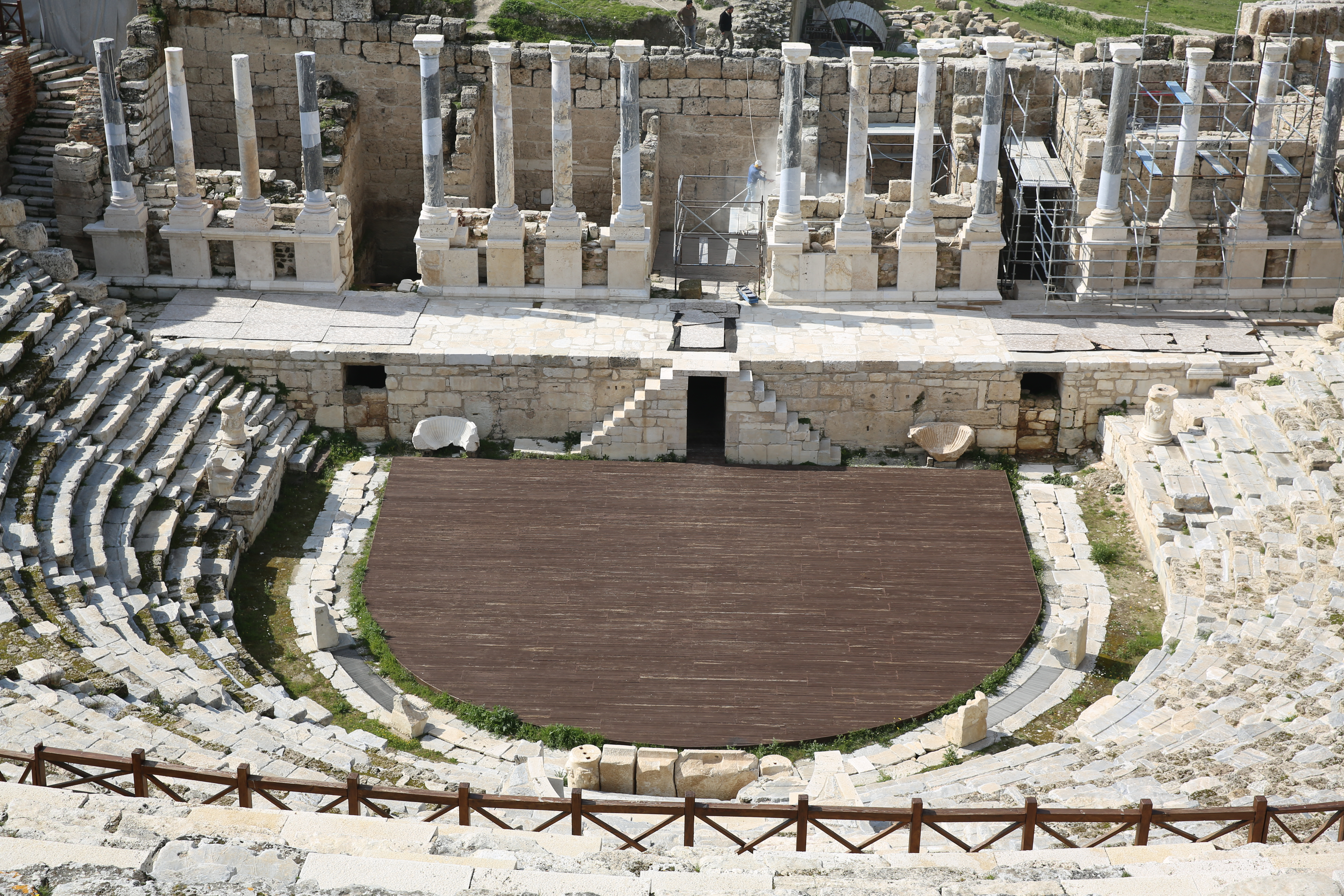

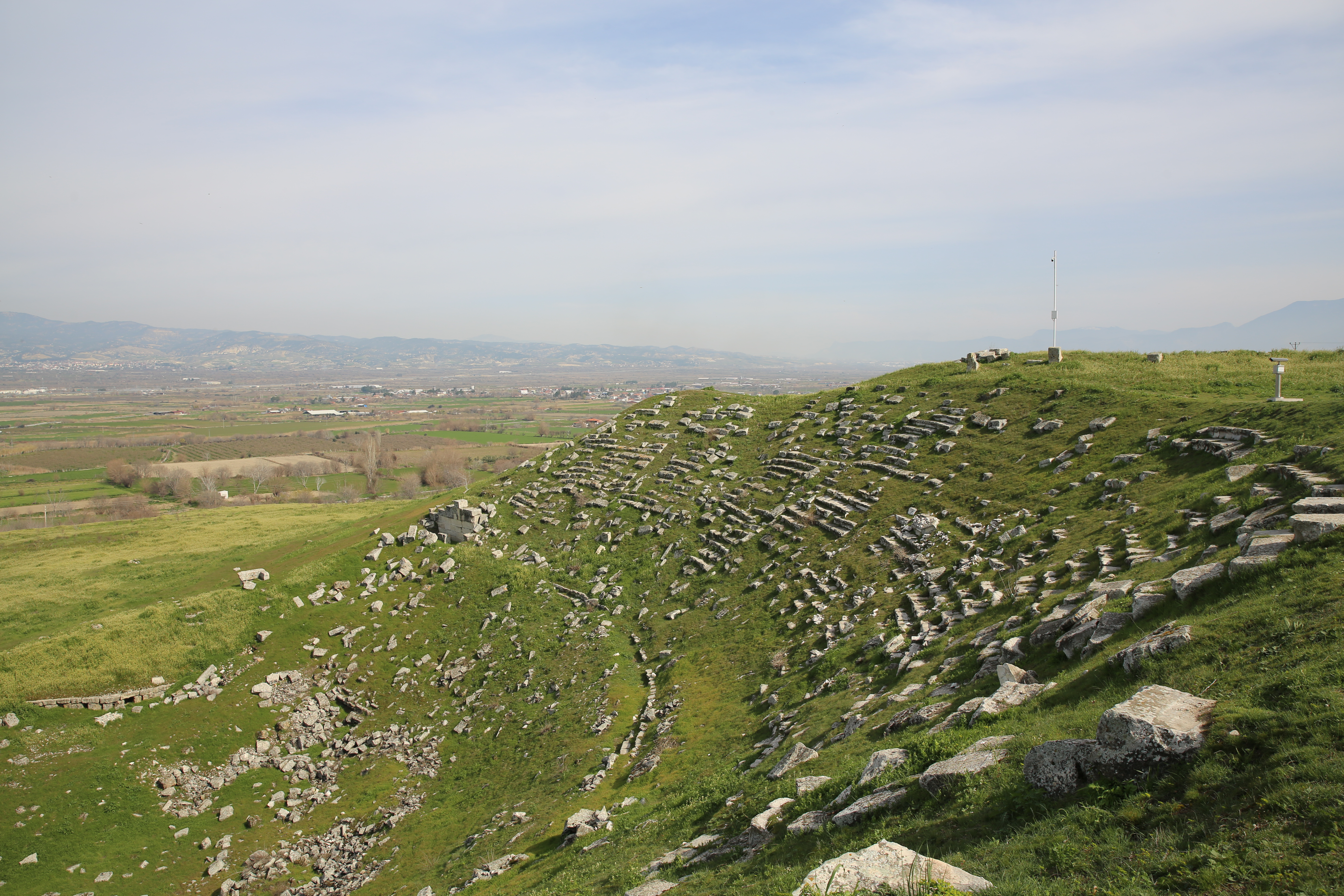

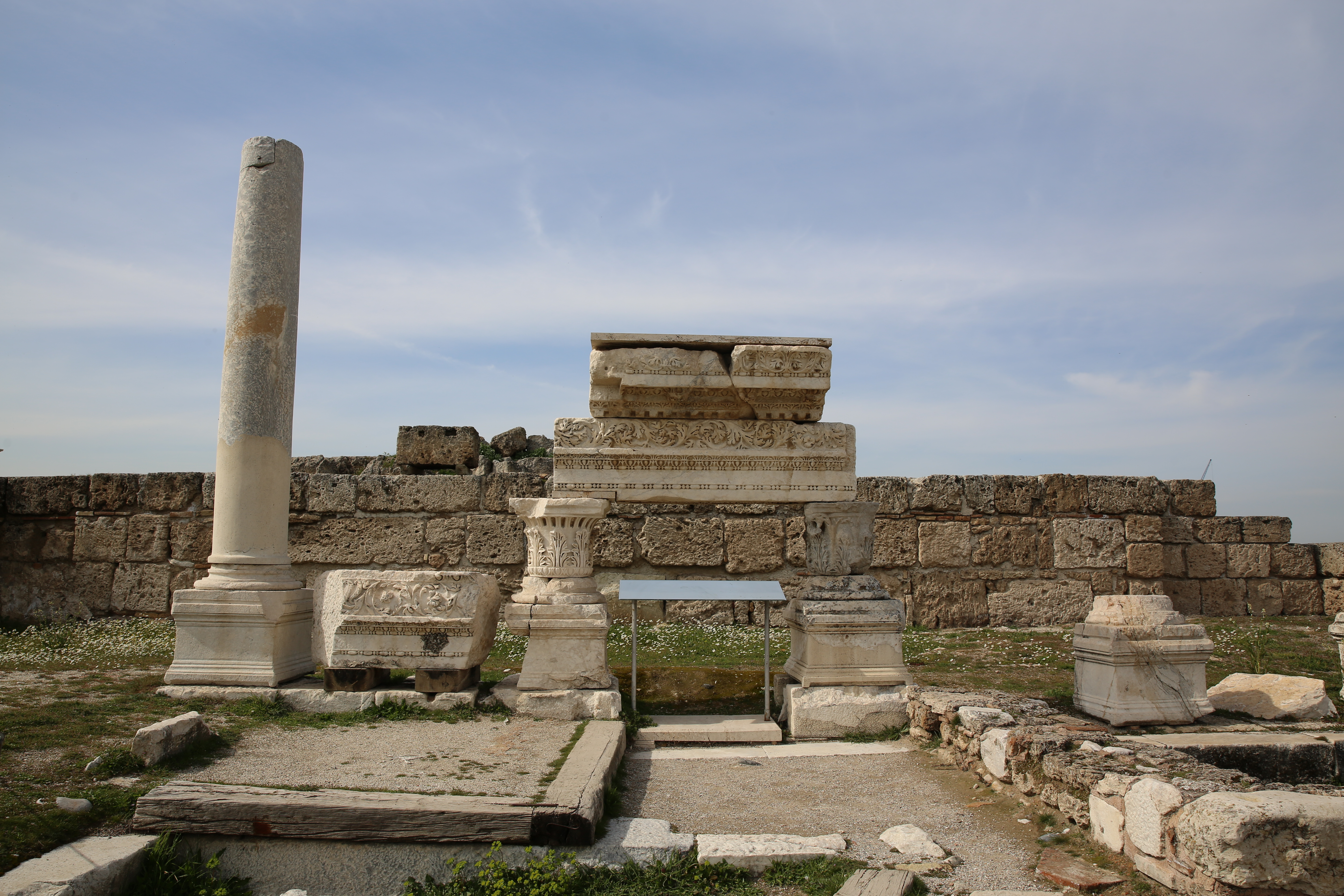

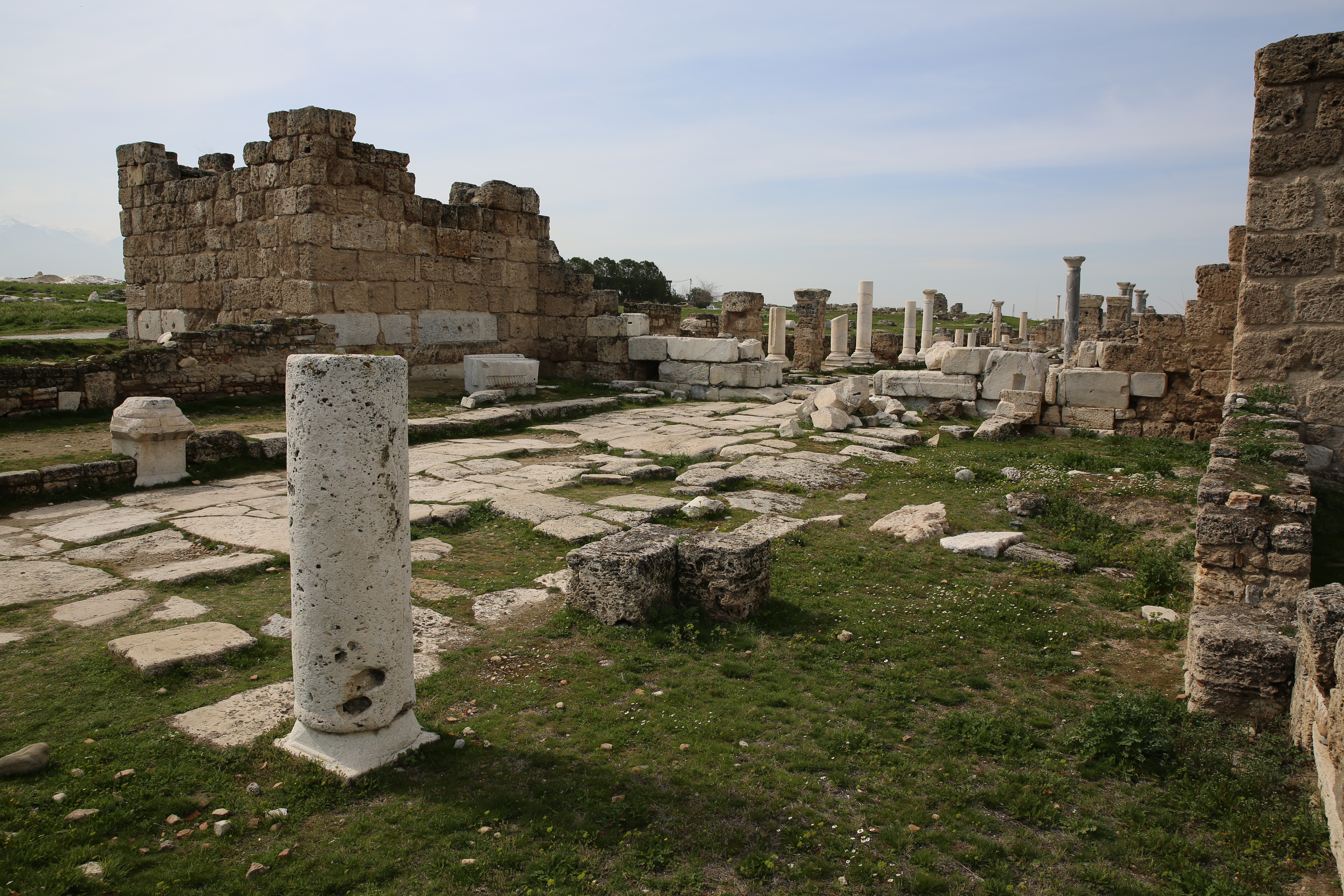

== Notable people ==
- Philonides of Laodicea, an Epicurean philosopher and mathematician
- Polemon of Laodicea, a sophist
- Menander Rhetor, rhetorician
- Varus of Laodicea (Ancient Greek: Οὔαρος), a sophist
- Antiochus of Laodicea (Ancient Greek: Ἀντίοχος), philosopher
- Theiodas of Laodicea (Ancient Greek: Θειωδᾶς), philosopher
- Heras of Laodicea (Ancient Greek: Ἡρᾶς), fighter
