= Gerald Fitch =

American basketball player (born 1982)

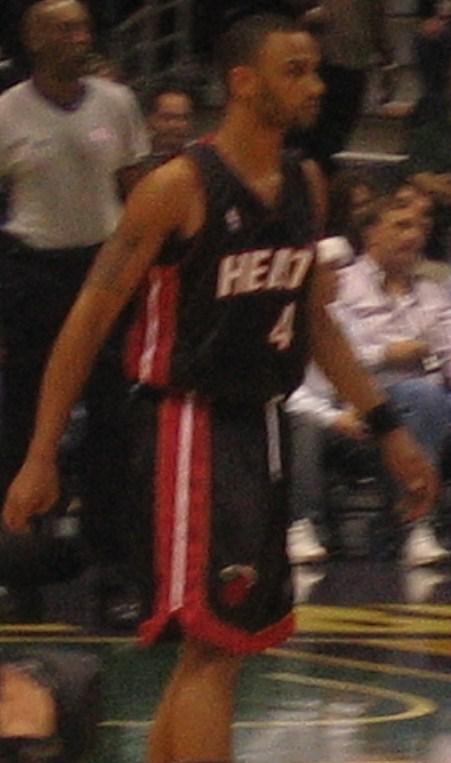
- Fitch with the Miami Heat in 2005

Personal information
- Born: August 12, 1982 (age 44) Columbus, Georgia, U.S.
- Listed height: 6 ft 3 in (1.91 m)
- Listed weight: 188 lb (85 kg)

Career information
- High school: Westside (Macon, Georgia)
- College: Kentucky (2000–2004)
- NBA draft: 2004: undrafted
- Playing career: 2004–2018
- Position: Shooting guard

Career history
- 2004–2005: Cibona
- 2005: Khimik
- 2005–2006: Miami Heat
- 2006: Austin Toros
- 2006–2007: Galatasaray
- 2007–2009: Pallacanestro Cantù
- 2009: Kepez Bld Antalya
- 2009–2010: Baloncesto Fuenlabrada
- 2010–2011: Aliaga Petkim
- 2011–2012: Unicaja Málaga
- 2012–2013: Strasbourg IG
- 2013–2014: Foshan Long Lions
- 2014: Mersin BB
- 2016: Piratas de Quebradillas
- 2016: Marinos de Anzoátegui
- 2017: San Lorenzo de Almagro
- 2017: Piratas de Quebradillas
- 2018: Regatas Corrientes

Career highlights
- Turkish League Top Scorer (2007); First-team All-SEC (2004)
- Stats at NBA.com
- Stats at Basketball Reference

Gerald Edwind Fitch (born August 12, 1982) is an American former professional basketball player who last played for Regatas Corrientes of the Liga Nacional de Básquet. He played college basketball for the Kentucky Wildcats and played internationally and in the National Basketball Association (NBA).

== College career ==
Fitch came to Kentucky in 2000 after being named Mr. Basketball in the state of Georgia his senior year at Westside High School in Macon, Georgia. Fitch entered the starting lineup early in his freshman year, and was named to the All-SEC Freshman Team. Fitch had a successful four years at Kentucky, leading the team to records of 32–4 and 27–5 in his junior and senior years, respectively. His college career ended, however, with a missed shot at the buzzer to seal an upset loss to UAB in the second round of the 2004 NCAA Tournament.

== Professional career ==
After going undrafted in the 2004 NBA draft, Fitch signed with the Washington Wizards prior to the 2004–05 season. He received playing time in the preseason, but was cut prior to the start of the regular season. Fitch then spent that season playing overseas in the Euroleague and the Ukrainian SuperLeague.

Prior to the 2005–06 season, Fitch signed with the Miami Heat, where he was used as third string point guard behind Jason Williams and Gary Payton. At the trade deadline on February 23, 2006, he was shipped to the Houston Rockets in exchange for Derek Anderson, and waived before ever playing a game for them.

On March 7, 2006, Fitch was assigned to the Austin Toros of the NBA Development League. The following season, he played for Turkish team Galatasaray Café Crown.

On October 1, 2007, the Detroit Pistons signed Fitch via free agency, but he was eventually released during preseason.

At the end of 2007, he was signed by Pallacanestro Cantù.

On January 25, 2011, he signed with Unicaja Málaga in Spain until the end of 2011–12 season.

For the 2013–14 season he signed with the Foshan Long Lions of the Chinese Basketball Association.

In March 2014, he signed with Mersin BB of Turkey for the rest of the season.

On February 7, 2016, he signed with the Piratas de Quebradillas of the Baloncesto Superior Nacional.

On January 12, 2017, he signed with San Lorenzo de Almagro of the Liga Nacional de Básquet.

On March 14, 2017, he re-joined the Piratas de Quebradillas for the 2017 BSN season.

On January 28, 2018, he signed with Regatas Corrientes.
