= Kafkanas =

Greek island in the Aegean Sea

Coordinates: 40°36′57″N 23°48′19″E

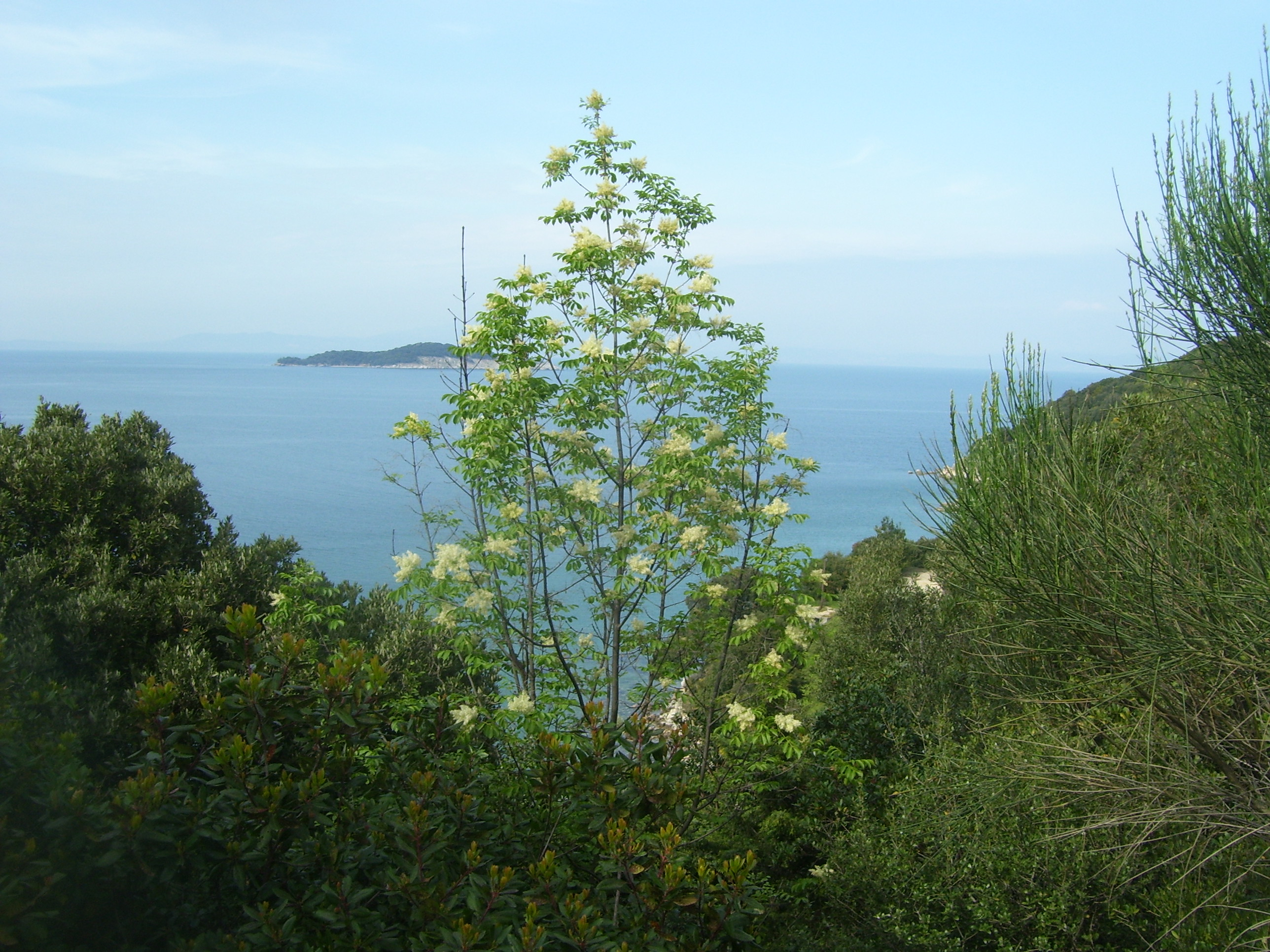
View of Kafkanas

Kafkanas (Greek: Καυκανάς) is an island in the Aegean Sea, just off the village of Olympiada. Anciently it was known as Caprus or Kapros (Ancient Greek: Κάπρος), a name shared with Caprus, the port of ancient Stagira. Administratively, it is part of the community Olympiada, Chalkidiki.
