= Polat Kocaoğlu =

Turkish basketball player (born 1979)

Gamateks Pamukkale Üniversitesi
- Position: Power forward
- League: Turkish Basketball Second League

Personal information
- Born: May 3, 1979 (age 47) Balıkesir, Turkey
- Listed height: 6 ft 9 in (2.06 m)

Career information
- Playing career: 1996–present

Career history
- 1996-1998: Tofaş
- 1998–2000: Oyak Renault
- 2001–2003: CASA TED Kolejliler
- 2005–2006: Erdemirspor
- 2006–2007: Darüşşafaka
- 2007–2008: Mersin BŞB
- 2008–2010: Galatasaray Café Crown
- 2010–2011: Antalya Büyükşehir Belediyesi
- 2011–2012: Olin Edirne
- 2012-2013: Türk Telekom
- 2013: Hacettepe Üniversitesi
- 2013-present: Gamateks Pamukkale Üniversitesi

Polat Kocaoğlu (born 3 May 1979) is a Turkish professional basketball player, currently plays for Gamateks Pamukkale Üniversitesi.
