= Eren Beyaz =

Turkish basketball player (born 1985)

Denizli Basket
- Position: Center
- League: Turkish Basketball League

Personal information
- Born: October 1, 1985 (age 41) Şişli, Istanbul, Turkey
- Listed height: 6 ft 10 in (2.08 m)
- Listed weight: 256 lb (116 kg)

Career information
- Playing career: 2002–present

Career history
- 2002–2006: Beşiktaş Cola Turka
- 2006–2007: Beykozspor
- 2007–2008: Darüşşafaka
- 2008–2009: Aliağa Petkim
- 2009–2010: Galatasaray Café Crown
- 2010–2012: Erdemir SK
- 2012–2013: Antalya BSB
- 2013–2014: Trabzonspor
- 2014–present: Denizli Basket

Eren Beyaz (born October 1, 1985) is a Turkish professional basketball player for Denizli Basket (2006).
