= Gürol Karamahmut =

Turkish basketball player (born 1980)

Gürol Karamahmut (born 1980) is a Turkish professional basketball player. He currently plays for Mersin Büyükşehir Belediyesi. Karamahmut has had a distinguished career in Turkish basketball, known for his skills as a forward. Over the years, he has played for several notable Turkish basketball teams, contributing significantly to their successes.
