= Pamukkale University =

Public university in Denizli, Turkey

- Pamukkale Üniversitesi
- Motto: The truest guide in life is science and technology. (Turkish: Hayatta en gerçek yol gösterici bilimdir.)
- Type: Public
- Established: 1957 / 1992
- Faculty: 1,500
- Administrative staff: 2,451
- Students: 45,174
- Location: Denizli, Turkey; 37.739787°N 29.101539°E
- Campus: Kınıklı Kampüsü
- Colours: Light blue and dark blue
- Nickname: PAU
- Website: www.pau.edu.tr

Pamukkale University (PAU) is a public university in Denizli, Turkey. The university has 45,000 students and 1,400 academicians.

== History ==
=== Early years ===
Pamukkale University's history began as a Female Normal School in 1957 in Denizli. It then turned into Education Institute in 1976 and served under Dokuz Eylül University as Denizli Education College in 1982. Denizli State Academy of Engineering and Architecture also opened in 1955 and later converted to College of Engineering.

== Faculties ==
=== Faculty of Education ===
- Teaching Social Fields
- Teaching English Language
- Teaching Preschool
- Teaching Music
- Psychological Counselling and Guidance
- Teaching Primary School
- Teaching Fine Arts
- Teaching Educative Sciences
- Teaching Turkish Language

=== Faculty of Arts and Sciences ===
- Archaeology
- Biology
- Chemistry
- Contemporary Turkish Dialects and Literatures
- History
- History of Art
- Mathematics
- Philosophy
- Physics
- Sociology
- Turkish Language and Literature
- Western Language and Literature

=== Faculty of Economics and Administrative Sciences ===
- Business Studies
- Political Science and Public Administration
- Labour Economics and Industrial Relations
- Economics
- Finance

=== Faculty of Engineering ===
- Computer Engineering
- Environmental Engineering
- Electrical and Electronic Engineering
- Industrial Engineering
- Food Engineering
- Civil Engineering
- Geophysics Engineering
- Geological Engineering
- Chemistry Engineering
- Mechanical engineering
- Textile Engineering

=== Faculty of Technical Education ===
- Teaching Automobile Mechanics
- Teaching Computer Systems
- Teaching Electronics

=== Faculty of Medicine ===
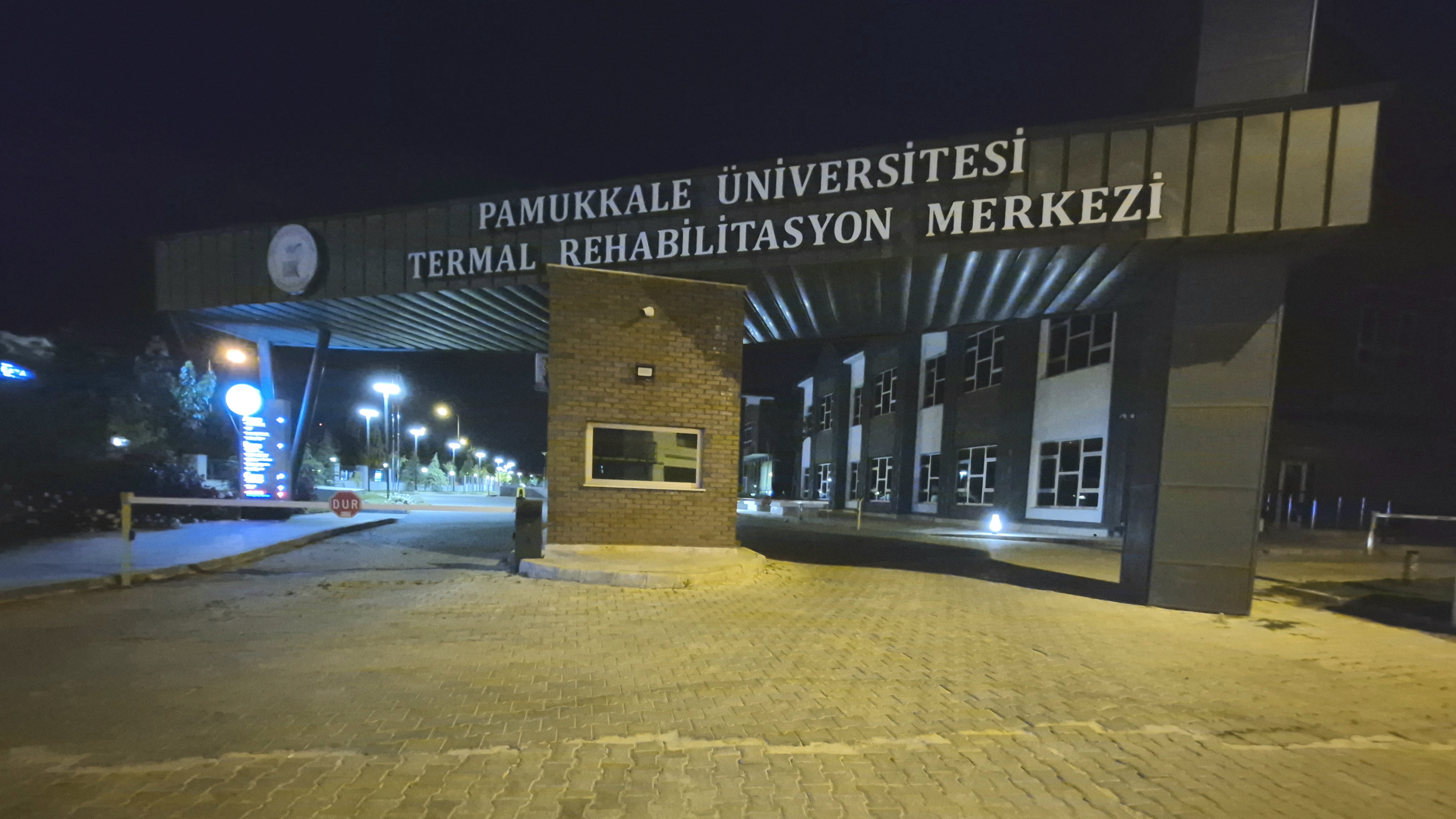
Pamukkale University's Thermal Rehabilitation Center

- Medicine

=== Faculty of Architecture and Design ===
- Architecture
- Landscape Architecture
- Urban & Regional Planning

=== Faculty of Theology ===
- Theology

== Schools ==
=== School of Sports Sciences and Technologies ===
- Recreation
- Trainer Education
- Teaching Physical Education and Sports

== Vocational schools ==
=== Denizli Vocational School ===
- Computer Technology and Programming/Child Development
- Handcrafts/Electrics/Industrial Electronics
- Chemistry/Mechanics/Furniture and Decoration
- Automobile/Textile
- Tourism and Hotel Management

=== Denizli Vocational School of Health Services ===
- Ambulance and Emergency Care Technician
- Anaesthesia
- Dialysis
- Physical Therapy
- Hydrotherapy
- Medical Documentation and Secretariat
- Medical lab

=== Bekilli Vocational School ===
- Office Management and Secretariat/Foreign trade
- Accounting/Marketing

=== Buldan Vocational School ===
- Office Management and Secretariat
- Foreign Trade
- Fashion and Textile Design
- Accounting
- Marketing

=== Çivril Vocational School ===
- Accounting
- Business Studies/Foreign Trade

=== Honaz Vocational School ===
- Banking
- Office Management and Secretariat
- Foreign Trade
- Public Relations/Business Studies
- Capital Market and Stock Exchange
- Accounting/Marketing

== Institutes ==
=== Institute of Applied Sciences ===
Master's programmes

- Computer Engineering
- Environmental Engineering
- Electrical-Electronic Engineering
- Industrial Engineering
- Food Engineering
- Civil Engineering
- Geological Engineering
- Chemical Engineering
- Mechanical Engineering
- Textile Engineering
- Science Education
- Secondary school Education in the fields of science and mathematics without thesis
- Automobile mechanics education
- Biology
- Physics
- Chemistry
- Mathematics

Ph.D. programmes

- Food Engineering
- Civil Engineering
- Geological Engineering
- Mechanical Engineering
- Biology
- Chemistry

=== Institute of Health Sciences ===
Master's programmes

- Anatomy
- Training and Movement
- Physical Education and Sports
- Physical Education and Sports Training
- Biochemistry
- Biostatistics
- Biophysics
- Pharmacology
- Physiology
- Physical Therapy and Rehabilitation
- Work and Occupational Therapy
- Public health Nursing
- Public health
- Histology and Embryology
- Microbiology
- Psychosocial Fields in Sport
- Medical biology

Ph.D. programmes

- Biochemistry
- Biophysics
- Physiology
- Physiotherapy and rehabilitation
- Neurological sciences

=== Institute of Social Sciences ===
Master's programmes

- Archaeology
- Western Languages and Literatures
- Educative Sciences Education
- Philosophy
- Fine Arts Education
- Economics
- Primary School Education
- Business studies
- Political science and public administration
- Finance
- History of Art
- Sociology
- History
- Turkish Language Education
- Turkish Language and Literature
- Secondary
- School science education
- English language education

Ph.D. programmes

- Economics
- Educative Sciences
- Turkish language and Literature
- Archaeology
- History
- Sociology

=== Institute of Islamic Sciences ===
Master's programmes

- Basic Islamıc Studies
- Philosophy and Religious Studies

Ph.D. programmes

- Philosophy and Religious Studies

== See also ==
- Pamukkale
- List of universities in Turkey
