= Caprus =

Town of Chalcidice in ancient Macedonia

Coordinates: 40°35′32″N 23°46′48″E

Caprus or Kapros (Ancient Greek: Κάπρος), was a town of Chalcidice, in ancient Macedonia. It was the port of Stagira to the southwest of the Strymonian Gulf.

The site of Caprus is near the modern Olympias.
