= 1985–86 Galatasaray S.K. (men's basketball) season =

Galatasaray SK
1985–86 season
- Chairman: (Turkey) Ali Uras
- Manager: (Turkey) Fehmi Sadıkoğlu
- Turkish Basketball League: 1st
- Turkish President Cup: Runner-Up

Galatasaray SK Men's 1985–1986 season is the 1985–1986 basketball season for Turkish professional basketball club Galatasaray SK.

The club competes in:

- Turkish Basketball League
- FIBA European Champions Cup

== Depth chart ==
Pos.	Starting 5	Bench 1	Bench 2
C	Mehmet Altıoklar	Okan Gedik	Bülent İldiz
PF	Mehmet Baç	Nihat İziç	Cem Caniklioğlu
SF	Paul Dawkins	Cihat Levent
SG	Turgay Demirel	Michael Scearce	Mehmet Ali Tlabar
PG	Turgut Tayyar	Mehmet Şenova

== Squad changes for the 1985–1986 season ==
In: Note: Flags indicate national team as defined under FIFA eligibility rules; some limited exceptions apply. Players may hold more than one non-FIFA nationality.

No.	Pos.	Nation	Player
11	PF	TUR	Mehmet Ali Tlabar (from Çukurova Sanayi)
21	PF	TUR	Cem Caniklioğlu (from Free agent)
31	PF	TUR	Bülent İldiz (from Free agent)
41	PF	TUR	Turgut Tayyar (from Karşıyaka)

Out: Note: Flags indicate national team as defined under FIFA eligibility rules; some limited exceptions apply. Players may hold more than one non-FIFA nationality.

No.	Pos.	Nation	Player
5		TUR	Remzi Dilli (to Tofaş SAS)

== Results, schedules and standings ==
=== Turkish Basketball League 1985–86 ===
==== Regular season ====
Pos	Team	Total					
		Pts	Pld	W	L	F	A
1	Efes Pilsen S.K.	37	21	16	5	1631	1517
2	Çukurova Sanayi	37	21	16	5	1858	1706
3	Galatasaray SK	36	21	15	6	1898	1797
4	Eczacıbaşı	34	21	13	8	1898	1797
5	HORTAŞ Yenişehir	33	21	12	9	1925	1832
6	Fenerbahçe SK	32	21	11	10	1777	1747
7	Karşıyaka	32	21	11	10	1731	1713
8	Tofaş SAS	30	21	9	12	1679	1811
9	Beşiktaş JK	29	21	8	13	1714	1784
10	İTÜ B.K.	27	21	6	15	1581	1701
11	Hilalspor	25	21	4	17	1605	1856
12	Tarsus İdmanyurdu Erkutspor	0	21	0	11	0	22

Pts=Points, Pld=Matches played, W=Matches won, L=Matches lost, F=Points for, A=Points against
Tarsus İdmanyurdu Erkutspor withdrew from Turkish Basketball League prior to the regular season kick off. During the first half of regular season, game scores registered as 0-2 and then the team dismissed from regular season second half schedule.

1st Half

October 6, 1985

(Report)

Galatasaray SK	2–0	Tarsus İdmanyurdu Erkutspor

N/A, Istanbul
Attendance: unknown

October 13, 1985

(Report)

Galatasaray SK	89–78	Efes Pilsen S.K.
Scoring by half: 46–38, 43–40
Pts: Michael Scearce 19, Paul Dawkins 33, Turgay Demirel 9 Rebs: Paul Dawkins 13, Michael Scearce 10		Pts: Brian Kellerman 24, Emir Turam 18, Scott Roth 15; Rebs: Emir Turam 6, Brian Kellerman 5

Lütfü Kırdar, Istanbul
Attendance: unknown

October 18, 1985
16:30 TSI

(Report)

Galatasaray SK	117–85	Hilalspor
Scoring by half: 45–36, 72–49
Pts: Michael Scearce 11, Paul Dawkins 43, Turgay Demirel 12; Rebs: Paul Dawkins 13, Michael Scearce 7		Pts: Anthony Lee 29, Frank Hudson 20, Osman Savran 13; Rebs: Lee 13, Şadi 8

Lütfü Kırdar, Istanbul
Attendance: unknown

October 27, 1985
16:30 TSI

(Report)

Galatasaray SK	105–103	Eczacıbaşı
Scoring by half: 49–50, 56–53
Pts: Michael Scearce 28, Paul Dawkins 31, Turgay Demirel 13; Rebs: Paul Dawkins 9, Michael Scearce 14		Pts: Erman Kunter 26, Omer Buyukaycan 25, Orlando Phillips 21; Rebs: Orlando Phillips 19, Omer Buyukaycan 6

Lütfü Kırdar, Istanbul
Attendance: unknown

October 30, 1985
20:30 TSI

(Report)

Galatasaray SK	98–92	Tofaş SAS
Scoring by half: 53–44, 45–48
Pts: Michael Scearce 18, Paul Dawkins 36, Turgay Demirel 16; Rebs: Paul Dawkins 9, Michael Scearce 27		Pts: Mark Halsel 32, Franklin Giles 24, Uğur Özmen 16; Rebs: Franklin Giles 13

Lütfü Kırdar, Istanbul
Attendance: unknown

November 2, 1985
16:30 TSI

(Report)

Galatasaray SK	97–80	Beşiktaş JK
Scoring by half: 53–44, 45–48
Pts: Michael Scearce 28, Paul Dawkins 32, Mehmet Baç 17; Rebs: Paul Dawkins 10, Michael Scearce 15		Pts: Mike Robinson 20, Ronald Maben 18, İhsan Bayülken 18; Rebs: Mike Robinson 23

Lütfü Kırdar, Istanbul
Attendance: unknown

November 9, 1985
11:00 TSI

(Report)

Çukurova Sanayi	121–115	Galatasaray SK
Scoring by half: 67–62, 54–53
Pts: Calvin Roberts 36, Billy Lewis 41; Rebs: Calvin Roberts 14		Pts: Michael Scearce 35, Paul Dawkins 37; Rebs: Paul Dawkins 8, Michael Scearce 19

Edip Buran, Mersin
Attendance: unknown

November 15, 1985

(Report)

Galatasaray SK	76–68	İTÜ B.K.
Scoring by half: 32–40, 44–28
Pts: Michael Scearce 19, Paul Dawkins 29, Mehmet Baç 10; Rebs: Paul Dawkins 8, Michael Scearce 16		Pts: Anton Cogic 22, Obrad Sarancic 18, Levent Topsakal 16; Rebs: Obrad Sarancic 12

Lütfü Kırdar, Istanbul
Attendance: unknown

December 3, 1985

(Report)

Hortaş Yenişehir	69–83	Galatasaray SK
Scoring by half: 29–47, 40–36
Pts: Davis 15, Griffin 16		Pts: Mihaaelle Scearce 16, Paul Dawkins 27, Mehmet Baç 15

Ankara,
Attendance: unknown

December 6, 1985

(Report)

Galatasaray SK	93–95	Karşıyaka
Scoring by half: 40–41, 53–54
Pts: Michael Scearce 11, Paul Dawkins 40; Rebs: Paul Dawkins 10, Michael Scearce 9		Pts: Doğan 29, Davis 24; Rebs: Wilson 21

Lütfü Kırdar, Istanbul
Attendance: unknown

December 15, 1985
11:00 TSI

(Report)

Galatasaray SK	74–67	Fenerbahçe SK
Scoring by half: 32–40, 44–28
Pts: Michael Scearce 32, Turgut Tayyar 16; Rebs: Michael Scearce 18		Pts: Michael Terpstra 20, Efe Aydan 19, Jay Triano 17; Rebs: Efe Aydan 13

Lütfü Kırdar, Istanbul
Attendance: unknown

2nd Half

December 21, 1985

(Report)

Beşiktaş JK	100–87	Galatasaray SK
Scoring by half: 43–35, 57–52
Pts: Robinson 35, Turhan 24, İhsan Bayülken 20; Rebs: Robinson 16		Pts: Michael Scearce 31, Paul Dawkins 4 Rebs: Michael Scearce 23

N/A,
Attendance: unknown

January 2, 1986

(Report)

Hilalspor	86–84	Galatasaray SK
Scoring by half: 41–43, 45–41
Pts: Frank 26, Anthony 18		Pts: Michael Scearce 10, Paul Dawkins 28

İzmir,
Attendance: unknown

January 5, 1986

(Report)

Galatasaray SK	101–96	Eczacıbaşı
Scoring by half: 45–37, 56–59
Pts: Mehmet Ali 20, Paul Dawkins 37; Rebs: Paul Dawkins 12, Michael Scearce 9		Pts: Orlando Williams 25, Erman Kunter 22; Rebs: Orlando Williams 11

Lütfü Kırdar, Istanbul
Attendance: unknown

January 11, 1986

(Report)

Galatasaray SK	89–87	Çukurova Sanayi
Scoring by half: 43–44, 46–43
Pts: Michael Scearce 27, Paul Dawkins 35; Rebs: Paul Dawkins 7, Michael Scearce 12		Pts: Calvin Roberts 33, Billy 22; Rebs: Calvin Roberts 15

Lütfü Kırdar, Istanbul
Attendance: unknown

January 18, 1986

(Report)

Galatasaray SK	89–76	İTÜ B.K.
Scoring by half: 41–42, 54–46
Pts: Michael Scearce 17, Paul Dawkins 28, Mehmet Ali 22; Rebs: Paul Dawkins 10, Michael Scearce 12		Pts: Sarancic 24, Zeki 18; Rebs: Sarancic 9, Zeki 11

Lütfü Kırdar, Istanbul
Attendance: unknown

January 25, 1986

(Report)

Galatasaray SK	90–87	Hortaş Yenişehir
Scoring by half: 40–44, 37–46
Pts: Michael Scearce 21, Paul Dawkins 22; Rebs: Paul Dawkins 8, Michael Scearce 11		Pts: Hakan 18; Rebs: Sarancic 9, Zeki 11

Lütfü Kırdar, Istanbul
Attendance: unknown

February 1, 1986

(Report)

Karşıyaka	90–93	Galatasaray SK
Scoring by half: 44–48, 46–45
Pts: Murat 28, Wilson 25		Pts: Mihaelle Scearce 23, Paul Dawkins 32, Nihat İziç 16

N/A, İzmir
Attendance: unknown

February 6, 1986

(Report)

Tofaş SAS	105–98	Galatasaray SK
Scoring by half: 61–60, 44–38
Pts: Mark 28, Giles 21		Pts: Mihaelle Scearce 30, Paul Dawkins 34, Nihat İziç 15

Bursa, Turkey
Attendance: unknown

February 19, 1986

(Report)

Efes Pilsen S.K.	113–112	Galatasaray SK
Scoring by half: 61–55, 43–49
Pts: Scott Roth 30, Emir Turam 22		Pts: Mihaaelle Scearce 22, Paul Dawkins 44, Cihat Levent 15

Lütfü Kırdar, Istanbul
Attendance: unknown

February 26, 1986
17:30 TSI

(Report)

Galatasaray SK	106–99	Fenerbahçe SK
Scoring by half: 53–50, 53–49
Pts: Michael Scearce 26, Paul Dawkins 31, Nihat İziç 17		Pts: Michael Terpstra 24, Efe Aydan 15, Jay Triano 37

Lütfü Kırdar, Istanbul
Attendance: unknown

==== Playoffs ====
===== Quarter-finals =====
March 5, 1986
17:30 TSI

(Report)

Fenerbahçe SK	73–75	Galatasaray SK
Pts: Michael Terpstra 17, Efe Aydan 26		Pts: Mihaaelle Scearce 21, Paul Dawkins 23

Lütfü Kırdar, Istanbul
Attendance: unknown

March 7, 1986
18:00 TSI

(Report)

Galatasaray SK	96–90	Fenerbahçe SK
Scoring by half: 52–40, 44–50
Pts: Mihaaelle Scearce 35, Paul Dawkins 34, Turgay Demirel 9		Pts: Michael Terpstra 30, Jay Triano 14, Hakan Artış 14

Lütfü Kırdar, Istanbul
Attendance: unknown

===== Semi-finals =====
March 11, 1986
17:30 TSI

(Report)

Galatasaray SK	107–95	Çukurova Sanayi
Scoring by half: 48–55, 59–40
Pts: Paul Dawkins 35, Turgay Demirel 11, Michael Scearce 36		Pts: Calvin Roberts 34, Billy Lewis 33

Lütfü Kırdar, Istanbul
Attendance: unknown

March 13, 1986
17:30 TSI

(Report)

Çukurova Basket	109–107	Galatasaray SK
Scoring by half: 57–51, 52–56
Pts: Billy Lewis 44, Calvin Roberts 18		Pts: Paul Dawkins 31, Michael Scearce 34

Edip Buran Salonu, Mersin
Attendance: unknown

March 15, 1986
17:30 TSI

(Report)

Galatasaray SK	82–81	Çukurova Sanayi
Scoring by half: 41–43, 41–38
Pts: Paul Dawkins 19, Turgay Demirel 18, Michael Scearce 18		Pts: Billy Lewis 36, Serdar Koçyiğit 18

Lütfü Kırdar, Istanbul
Attendance: unknown

===== Finals =====
March 18, 1986
17:00 TSI

(Report)

Galatasaray SK	102–109	Efes Pilsen S.K.
Scoring by half: 62–51, 40–58
Pts: Michael Scearce 14, Paul Dawkins 49, Nihat İziç 15		Pts: Scott Roth 41, Taner Korucu 25, Lütfü Arıboğan 13, Emir Turam 13

Lütfü Kırdar, Istanbul
Attendance: unknown

March 20, 1986
17:00 TSI

(Report)

Efes Pilsen S.K.	86–90	Galatasaray SK
Scoring by half: 46–52, 40–38
Pts: Brian Kellerman 23, Scott Roth 17		Pts: Michael Scearce 13, Nihat İziç 23, Turgay Demirel 15, Paul Dawkins 20

Lütfü Kırdar, Istanbul
Attendance: unknown

March 22, 1986
15:00 TSI

(Report)

Efes Pilsen S.K.	65–79	Galatasaray SK
Scoring by half: 32–41, 33–38
Pts: Emir Turam 20, Scott Roth 17		Pts: Michael Scearce 20, Paul Dawkins 19, Cihat Levent 15

Lütfü Kırdar, Istanbul
Attendance: unknown

=== President Cup ===
April 5, 1986
15:30 TSI

(Report)

Galatasaray SK	100–101	Efes Pilsen S.K.
Scoring by half: 53–55, 47–46
Pts: Paul Dawkins 43, Michael Scearce 15, Nihat İziç 11; Rebs: Paul Dawkins 9, Michael Scearce 10		Pts: Scott Roth 32, Brian Kellerman 21; Rebs: Scott Roth 7, Lütfü Arıboğan 7

Lütfü Kırdar, Istanbul
Attendance: unknown

=== FIBA European Champions Cup ===
October 3, 1985
20:00 TSI

[ (Report)]

Galatasaray SK	97–110	Cibona Zagreb
Scoring by half: 47–56, 50–54
Pts: Paul Dawkins 34, Michael Scearce 22, Turgay Demirel 10		Pts: Dražen Petrović 38, Sven Ušić 22, Zoran Čutura 16, Branko Vukićević 12

Lütfü Kırdar, Istanbul
Attendance: unknown

October 10, 1985
20:00 TSI

[ (Report)]

Cibona Zagreb	121–106	Galatasaray SK
Scoring by half: 62–50, 59–56

Zagreb, Yugoslavia
Attendance: unknown
