= 1984–85 Galatasaray S.K. (men's basketball) season =

Galatasaray SK
1984–85 season
- Chairman: (Turkey) Ali Uras
- Manager: (Turkey) Nur Germen
- Turkish Basketball League: 1st
- Turkish President Cup: Winner

Galatasaray SK Men's 1984–1985 season is the 1984–1985 basketball season for Turkish professional basketball club Galatasaray SK.

The club competes in:

- Turkish Basketball League

== Depth chart ==
Pos.	Starting 5	Bench
C	Mehmet Altıoklar	Okan Gedik
PF	Mehmet Baç	Nihat İziç
SF	Paul Dawkins	Cihat Levent
SG	Turgay Demirel	Michael Scearce
PG	Remzi Dilli	Mehmet Şenova

== Squad changes for the 1984–1985 season ==
In: Note: Flags indicate national team as defined under FIFA eligibility rules; some limited exceptions apply. Players may hold more than one non-FIFA nationality.

No.	Pos.	Nation	Player
41	PF	USA	Michael Scearce (from Güney Sanayi)

Out: Note: Flags indicate national team as defined under FIFA eligibility rules; some limited exceptions apply. Players may hold more than one non-FIFA nationality.

No.	Pos.	Nation	Player
5		TUR	Hasan Arat (to Free agent)
4		TUR	Aydın Yılmaztürk (to İTÜ B.K.)

== Results, schedules and standings ==
=== Regular season ===
Pos	Team	Total						
		Pts	Pld	W	L	F	A	D
1	Fenerbahçe SK	42	22	20	1	1858	1625	+233
2	Galatasaray SK	39	22	17	5	2125	1807	+318
3	Cukurova Sanayi	39	22	17	5	1747	1636	+111
4	Efes Pilsen S.K.	38	22	16	6	2006	1731	+275
5	Eczacıbaşı	36	22	15	7	1907	1938	-31
6	Karşıyaka	35	22	13	6	1874	1727	+147
7	Tofaş SAS	33	22	11	1	1693	1682	+11
8	İTÜ B.K.	30	22	8	14	1844	1935	-91
9	Beşiktaş JK	28	22	6	16	1786	1879	-93
10	Hilalspor	26	22	4	18	1611	1889	-278
11	TED Ankara Kolejliler	25	22	3	19	1555	1905	-350
12	Anadoluhisarı Basket	23	22	2	20	1599	2071	-471

Pts=Points, Pld=Matches played, W=Matches won, L=Matches lost, F=Points for, A=Points against, D=Points difference
1st Half

October 13, 1984
11:00 TSI

(Report)

Galatasaray SK	110–55	Anadoluhisarı Basket
Pts: Michael Scearce 22, Paul Dawkins 23, Turgay Demirel 17		Pts: Blue 16, Sinan 14

Lütfü Kırdar, Istanbul
Attendance: unknown

October 23, 1984
11:00 TSI

(Report)

Galatasaray SK	81–83	Fenerbahçe SK
Scoring by half: 45–46, 36–37
Pts: Michael Scearce 26, Paul Dawkins 17, Turgay Demirel 17		Pts: Calvin Roberts 23, Efe Aydan 21

Lütfü Kırdar, Istanbul
Attendance: unknown

October 27, 1984
11:00 TSI

(Report)

Galatasaray SK	88–94	İTÜ B.K.
Pts: Michael Scearce 22, Paul Dawkins 30, Turgay Demirel 17		Pts: Levent 33, Cogic 22

Lütfü Kırdar, Istanbul
Attendance: unknown

October 31, 1984
11:00 TSI

(Report)

Çukurova Sanayi	67–64	Galatasaray SK
Pts: Ricky 25, Lester 22		Pts: Michael Scearce 25, Paul Dawkins 37

Lütfü Kırdar, Istanbul
Attendance: unknown

November 3, 1984
11:00 TSI

(Report)

Galatasaray SK	109–73	Tofaş SAS
Pts: Michael Scearce 20, Paul Dawkins 32		Pts: Derya 28, Giles 11

Lütfü Kırdar, Istanbul
Attendance: unknown

November 4, 1984
11:00 TSI

(Report)

Galatasaray SK	96–59	TED Ankara Kolejliler
Pts: Michael Scearce 19, Paul Dawkins 19		Pts: Zeki 16, Lee 15

Lütfü Kırdar, Istanbul
Attendance: unknown

November 17, 1984
11:00 TSI

(Report)

Galatasaray SK	104–90	Beşiktaş JK
Pts: Michael Scearce 47, Paul Dawkins 26		Pts: Osman 33, Turhan 19

Lütfü Kırdar, Istanbul
Attendance: unknown

December 3, 1984
11:00 TSI

(Report)

Galatasaray SK	101–98	Eczacıbaşı
Pts: Michael Scearce 29, Paul Dawkins 28		Pts: Erman 26, Melih 19

Lütfü Kırdar, Istanbul
Attendance: unknown

December 8, 1984
11:00 TSI

(Report)

Hilalspor	86–102	Galatasaray SK
Pts: Şadi 22, Osman 19		Pts: Michael Scearce 28, Paul Dawkins 32

Lütfü Kırdar, Istanbul
Attendance: unknown

December 9, 1984
11:00 TSI

(Report)

Karşıyaka	80–88	Galatasaray SK
Pts: Cihangir 23, Davis 15		Pts: Michael Scearce 35, Paul Dawkins 30

Lütfü Kırdar, Istanbul
Attendance: unknown

December 15, 1984
11:00 TSI

(Report)

Efes Pilsen S.K.	111–104	Galatasaray SK
Pts: Billy 42, Haigler 19		Pts: Michael Scearce 34, Paul Dawkins 37

Lütfü Kırdar, Istanbul
Attendance: unknown

2nd Half

December 29, 1984
11:00 TSI

(Report)

Galatasaray SK	110–79	Anadoluhisarı Basket
Pts: Michael Scearce 34, Paul Dawkins 28		Pts: Blue 25, Noyan 21

Lütfü Kırdar, Istanbul
Attendance: unknown

December 30, 1984
11:00 TSI

(Report)

Galatasaray SK	110–72	Çukurova Sanayi
Pts: Michael Scearce 30, Paul Dawkins 34		Pts: Lester 25, Ricky 20

Lütfü Kırdar, Istanbul
Attendance: unknown

January 5, 1985
11:00 TSI

(Report)

Galatasaray SK	93–65	Hilalspor
Scoring by half: 39–32, 54–33
Pts: Paul Dawkins 15, Michael Scearce 25		Pts: Metin 24, Şadi 18

Lütfü Kırdar, Istanbul
Attendance: unknown

January 7, 1985
11:00 TSI

(Report)

Galatasaray SK	72–83	Karşıyaka
Scoring by half: 43–41, 29–42
Pts: Paul Dawkins 26, Michael Scearce 32		Pts: Cihangir 24, Murat 23

Lütfü Kırdar, Istanbul
Attendance: unknown

January 13, 1985
11:00 TSI

(Report)

Galatasaray SK	78–77	Efes Pilsen S.K.
Scoring by half: 35–37, 43–40
Pts: Paul Dawkins 32, Michael Scearce 13		Pts: Haigler 27, Taner 18

Lütfü Kırdar, Istanbul
Attendance: unknown

January 19, 1985
16:30 TSI

(Report)

Galatasaray SK	94–93	Fenerbahçe SK
Scoring by half: 40–47, 54–46
Pts: Paul Dawkins 30, Turgay Demirel 29, Michael Scearce 24		Pts: Calvin Roberts 31, Efe Aydan 27, Hakan Artış 18

Lütfü Kırdar, Istanbul
Attendance: unknown

January 27, 1985
11:00 TSI

(Report)

Galatasaray SK	108–101	Eczacıbaşı
Pts: Michael Scearce 24, Paul Dawkins 41		Pts: Erman 36, Jim 26

Lütfü Kırdar, Istanbul
Attendance: unknown

February 2, 1985
11:00 TSI

(Report)

Galatasaray SK	110–103	Beşiktaş JK
Pts: Paul Dawkins 40, Michael Scearce 29		Pts: Turhan 31, Ken 27

Lütfü Kırdar, Istanbul
Attendance: unknown

February 16, 1985
11:00 TSI

(Report)

TED Ankara Kolejliler	75–100	Galatasaray SK
Pts: Lee 24, Gürhan 15		Pts: Turgay Demirel 16, Paul Dawkins 38

Ankara
Attendance: unknown

March 2, 1985
11:00 TSI

(Report)

Galatasaray SK	101–91	İTÜ B.K.
Pts: Paul Dawkins 29, Michael Scearce 32		Pts: Cogic 30, Levent 22

Lütfü Kırdar, Istanbul
Attendance: unknown

March 9, 1985
11:00 TSI

(Report)

Tofaş SAS	72–102	Galatasaray SK
Pts: Mehmet 19, Tuncay 18		Pts: Nihat İziç 18, Paul Dawkins 38

Bursa
Attendance: unknown

=== Playoffs ===
==== Quarter-finals ====
March 15, 1985
17:30 TSI

(Report)

Galatasaray SK	97–78	Tofaş SAS
Scoring by half: 43–32, 54–46
Pts: Paul Dawkins 32, Turgay Demirel 11, Michael Scearce 22		Pts: Mustafa Battalgazi 20, Mehmet Döğüşken 16

Lütfü Kırdar, Istanbul
Attendance: unknown

March 17, 1985
17:30 TSI

(Report)

Tofaş SAS	66–67	Galatasaray SK
Scoring by half: 37–29, 29–38
Pts: Mustafa Battalgazi 18, Mehmet Döğüşken 17		Pts: Paul Dawkins 22, Turgay Demirel 12, Michael Scearce 19

Atatürk Spor Salonu, Bursa
Attendance: unknown

==== Semi-finals ====
March 22, 1985
17:30 TSI

(Report)

Galatasaray SK	94–80	Çukurova Sanayi
Scoring by half: 56–38, 38–42
Pts: Paul Dawkins 29, Turgay Demirel 17, Michael Scearce 21		Pts: Ricky Frazier 37, Serdar Koçyiğit 17

Lütfü Kırdar, Istanbul
Attendance: unknown

March 24, 1985
13:00 TSI

(Report)

Çukurova Basket	84–82	Galatasaray SK
Scoring by half: 45–44, 39–38
Pts: Ricky Frazier 30, Levent Şenol 20		Pts: Nihaz İziç 15, Turgay Demirel 13, Michael Scearce 37

Edip Buran Salonu, Mersin
Attendance: unknown

March 26, 1985
17:30 TSI

(Report)

Galatasaray SK	78–70	Çukurova Sanayi
Scoring by half: 39–40, 39–30
Pts: Paul Dawkins 16, Turgay Demirel 13, Michael Scearce 29		Pts: Ricky Frazier 22, Mehmet Ali Tlabar 13

Lütfü Kırdar, Istanbul
Attendance: unknown

==== Finals ====
March 29, 1985
17:30 TSI

(Report)

Fenerbahçe SK	83–89	Galatasaray SK
Scoring by half: 40–47, 43–42
Pts: Calvin Roberts 24, Efe Aydan 26		Pts: Michael Scearce 34, Paul Dawkins 23, Turgay Demirel 16

Lütfü Kırdar, Istanbul
Attendance: unknown

March 31, 1985
15:30 TSI

(Report)

Galatasaray SK	83–90	Fenerbahçe SK
Scoring by half: 36–56, 47–34
Pts: Michael Scearce 27, Paul Dawkins 29, Nihat İziç 10		Pts: Calvin Roberts 36, Efe Aydan 20

Lütfü Kırdar, Istanbul
Attendance: unknown

April 2, 1985
17:30 TSI

(Report)

Fenerbahçe SK	68–74	Galatasaray SK
Scoring by half: 26–40, 42–34
Pts: Calvin Roberts 30, Efe Aydan 21		Pts: Michael Scearce 21, Paul Dawkins 14, Turgay Demirel 16

Lütfü Kırdar, Istanbul
Attendance: unknown

=== President Cup ===
April 6, 1985
15:30 TSI

(Report)

Galatasaray SK	85–84	Fenerbahçe SK
Scoring by half: 38–53, 47–31
Pts: Paul Dawkins 32, Michael Scearce 14, Nihat İziç 20; Rebs: Paul Dawkins 9, Michael Scearce 16, Nihat İziç 6		Pts: Calvin Roberts 23, Efe Aydan 26; Rebs: Calvin Roberts 18, Efe Aydan 10

Lütfü Kırdar, Istanbul
Attendance: unknown
