= Ermal Kuqo =

Albanian basketball executive (born 1980)

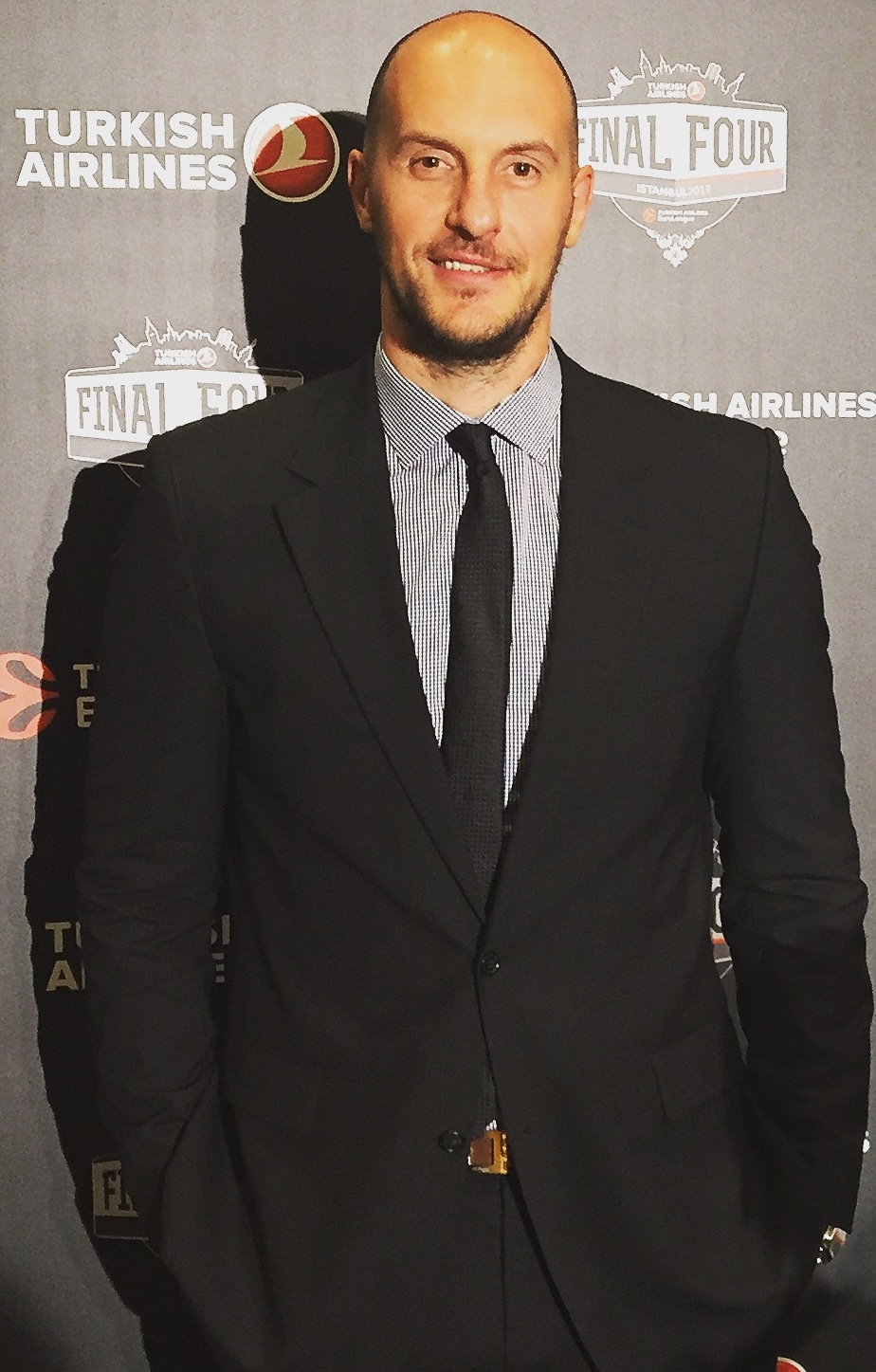

New York Knicks
- Position: Senior Director of Minor League Operations
- League: NBA

Personal information
- Born: 12 February 1980 (age 46) Korçë, Albania
- Listed height: 6 ft 9 in (2.06 m)
- Listed weight: 260 lb (118 kg)

Career information
- College: Fort Scott CC (1999–2000); Seminole State CC (2000–2001)
- NBA draft: 2002: undrafted
- Playing career: 1993–2016
- Number: 7, 23, 5, 12

Career history
- 1993–1995: Tirana
- 1995–1999: Fenerbahçe
- 2001–2002: KK Split
- 2002–2003: Pivovarna Laško
- 2003–2008: Efes Pilsen
- 2008–2009: Pamesa Valencia
- 2009–2010: Efes Pilsen
- 2010–2011: Galatasaray
- 2011–2013: Anadolu Efes
- 2013–2014: Banvit
- 2014–2015: Darüşşafaka
- 2015–2016: Türk Telekom

Career highlights
- As player: 2× Turkish League champion (2004, 2005); 2× Turkish Cup winner (2006, 2007); 2× Turkish President's Cup winner (2007, 2009); As executive: NBA champion (2026)

Ermal Kuqo (Turkish: Ermal Kurtoğlu; born 12 February 1980) is a retired Albanian-Turkish professional basketball player who played the majority of his career for Efes Pilsen. He is also a basketball executive for the New York Knicks of the NBA working as Senior Director of Minor League Operations. He was previously with the Los Angeles Clippers of the NBA working as Director of International Pro Player Personnel. He is widely accepted as the greatest Albanian basketball player of all times. Kuqo was a part of the Turkish national team from 2004 until 2010, but in the summer of 2010 got granted the wish to play for his birth country Albania national team.

== Professional career ==
Kuqo started his career in Tirana playing for KB Tirana during the 1994–95 season in the Albanian Basketball League at the age of 14. He was one of the youngest professional players of the league at the time. At the age of 15, Kuqo moved away from Albania to Istanbul, Turkey where he signed a long-term deal with Fenerbahçe. After having spent 4 years with the team from Istanbul, Ermal moved to the United States to continue his studies and play in college. He played college basketball at Fort Scott Community College in Fort Scott, Kansas and Seminole State College in Seminole, Oklahoma, United States for a then young Chris Beard (basketball) who is now one of the most respected NCAA college coaches in the United States. As he was immediately eligible to play in the NCAA Ermal signed a National Letter of Intent to play at the University of Tulsa after his successful season at Fort Scott, Kansas to play for the legendary coach Bill Self. But Bill Self left the University of Tulsa a couple of weeks after Ermal had signed his NLI and the university hired coach Buzz Peterson. Ermal did not see himself fit in coach Peterson's system and immediately asked to be released from his commitment, a wish that the school did not grant. This forced Kuqo to go back to NJCAA and he transferred to Seminole State College and reunite with Chris Beard (basketball). Both coaches have repeatedly spoken highly of Kuqo throughout the years

After his sophomore season at Seminole State College, Kuqo signed a Letter of Intent with Texas Tech University in the NCAA to play for the legendary Bobby Knight, but because of his previous European pro career, he got ruled ineligible. After that he decided to come back to Europe and continue his career with the famous Dalmatian team KK Split (ex-Jugoplastika). After a frustrating season with the Žuti he finally had his breakout season with the Slovenian club KK Pivovarna Laško, averaging almost 13 ppg and 7 rpg in the Adriatic League. In the summer of 2003 Ermal signed a two-year contract with the Turkish powerhouse Efes Pilsen, coached by Oktay Mahmuti, where he had an immediate impact both in the EuroLeague as well as in the Basketball Super League (Turkish: Basketbol Süper Ligi; BSL), establishing himself as one of the premier players of the team, winning back to back championships in 2004 and 2005.

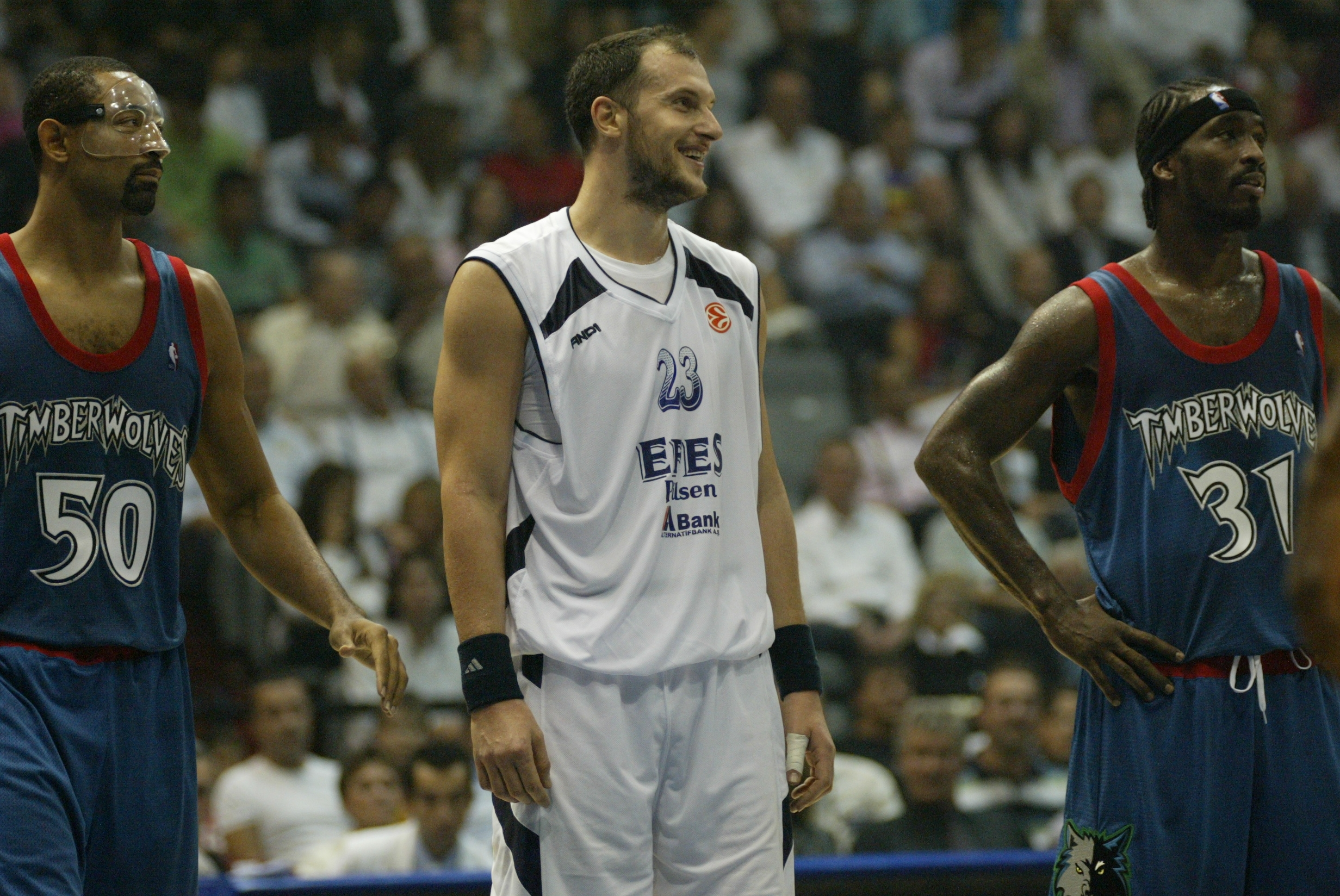
Ermal Kuqo, Juwan Howard and Ricky Davis during a free throw. The Minnesota Timberwolves played Efes Pilsen as part of the NBA Europe Live tour of 2007

At the end of 2007–08 season Kuqo signed a two-year deal with Pamesa Valencia. He had a very up and down and inconsistent season, especially after Neven Spahija took over from Fotios Katsikaris in mid November. Most of the time coach Spahija preferred Kosta Perović and Matt Nielsen playing together and was considering Kuqo to be a surplus to requirements. In late January he suffered a calf injury that put a stop to his playing time for at least a month, and that took Ermal out of the rotation. Even though he started the pre-season preparation with Valencia the next year, Kuqo and the team decided to part ways in early September and Kuqo after that signed a contract to come back to Efes Pilsen. After two frustrating seasons, his old coach Oktay Mahmuti offered Kuqo a contract to play for Galatasaray Spor Kulubu, offer which Ermal immediately accepted.

He had a chance to show his best self playing for Galatasaray in 2010–11 season where together with Preston Shumpert they led the team in scoring at 11 ppg and took their team to their first playoffs final since 1990 where they lost to a powerful Fenerbahçe team 4–2. At the end of that season Ermal was selected as a unanimous All Turkish League selection and Turkish League Center of the year by the prestigious basketball website Eurobasket.com. In June 2011, Ermal agreed to a two-year contract to play again for his former team Efes Pilsen.

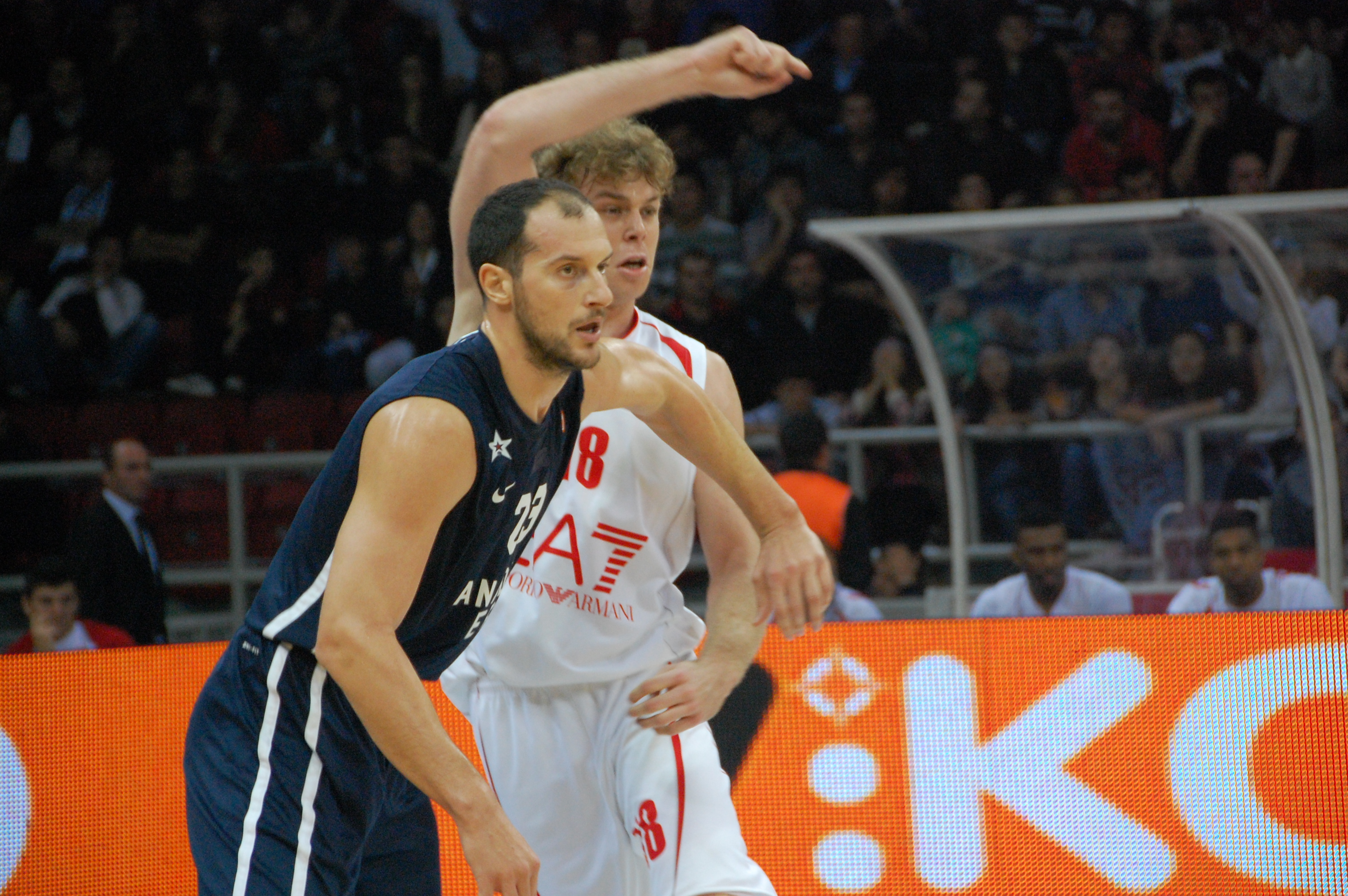
Ermal Kuqo and Nicolo Melli at Armani Milano @ Anadolu Efes Euroleague game 16 November 2012

On 12 July 2013, Ermal signed a contract to play for Dimitrios Itoudis at Banvit BK, now Teksüt Bandırma. He was the team's co-captain and stayed with the team for one year. During the season Banvit won the regular season and was the number 1 seed for the playoffs, but later lost to the eventual champions, Galatasaray in the semifinals.

In the summer of 2014, Kuqo signed with Darüşşafaka & Doğuş for the 2014–15 season, once again reuniting with his former coach Oktay Mahmuti and serving as the team's captain.

In June 2015, he signed with Türk Telekom for the 2015–16 season.

On 27 August 2016, he announced his retirement from basketball via his Twitter account.

== National team career ==
In the summer of 2004, facing a choice of national teams he selected Turkey, which gave him the opportunity to compete in the highest level competitions, such as EuroBasket and World Championships. Ermal's Turkey national team career reached its peak in the 2006 FIBA World Championship where they reached the 6th place. Ermal's best game in the tournament came against Lithuania where he scored 24 points and secured his team's win and also the 6th rank of the tournament. After playing for the Turkish side in two European Championships (2005, 2007) and a World Championship (2006), in 2010 he decided to ask FIBA to grant him permission to play for his native country of Albania. He led Albania in scoring in the summer of 2010 in FIBA's Division B games averaging 19 points per game. He represented the Albania national team for 4 years.

== Post-playing career ==
Kuqo started to work closely with the EuroLeague media department after finishing his playing career and is a regular fixture on the league's website's Experts Round Table series for the last 4 seasons. He was one of the Euroleague Ambassadors during the EuroLeague Final Four held in Istanbul in 2017 and took active part during the activities set up during the event. Ermal was the host of one of the EuroLeague Final Four 2017 promo mini documentaries featuring Istanbul as the only player to have played for all Euroleague teams of 2016–17 season from Istanbul. The documentary featured Ermal having conversations with several prominent names leading and representing Turkish basketball in several hotspots around the city of Istanbul. The highlight of the documentary is the casual dinner with two of the greatest coaches in the history of the Euroleague, Željko Obradović and David Blatt. The mini-film has had over 100k views on YouTube.

On 27 August 2016, he announced his retirement from professional basketball, Kuqo accepted an offer to become a scouting consultant for the Los Angeles Clippers of the National Basketball Association (NBA). On 30 September 2018, he was promoted to full-time international scout for the Los Angeles Clippers. On 1 July 2019, he was promoted to director of international pro scouting personnel for the Los Angeles Clippers.

On 3 September 2025, Kuqo was hired as the Senior Director of Minor League Operations for the New York Knicks.

On 13 June 2026, the New York Knicks beat the San Antonio Spurs 4–1 in the 2026 NBA Finals marking Kuqo's first championship as a front office executive.

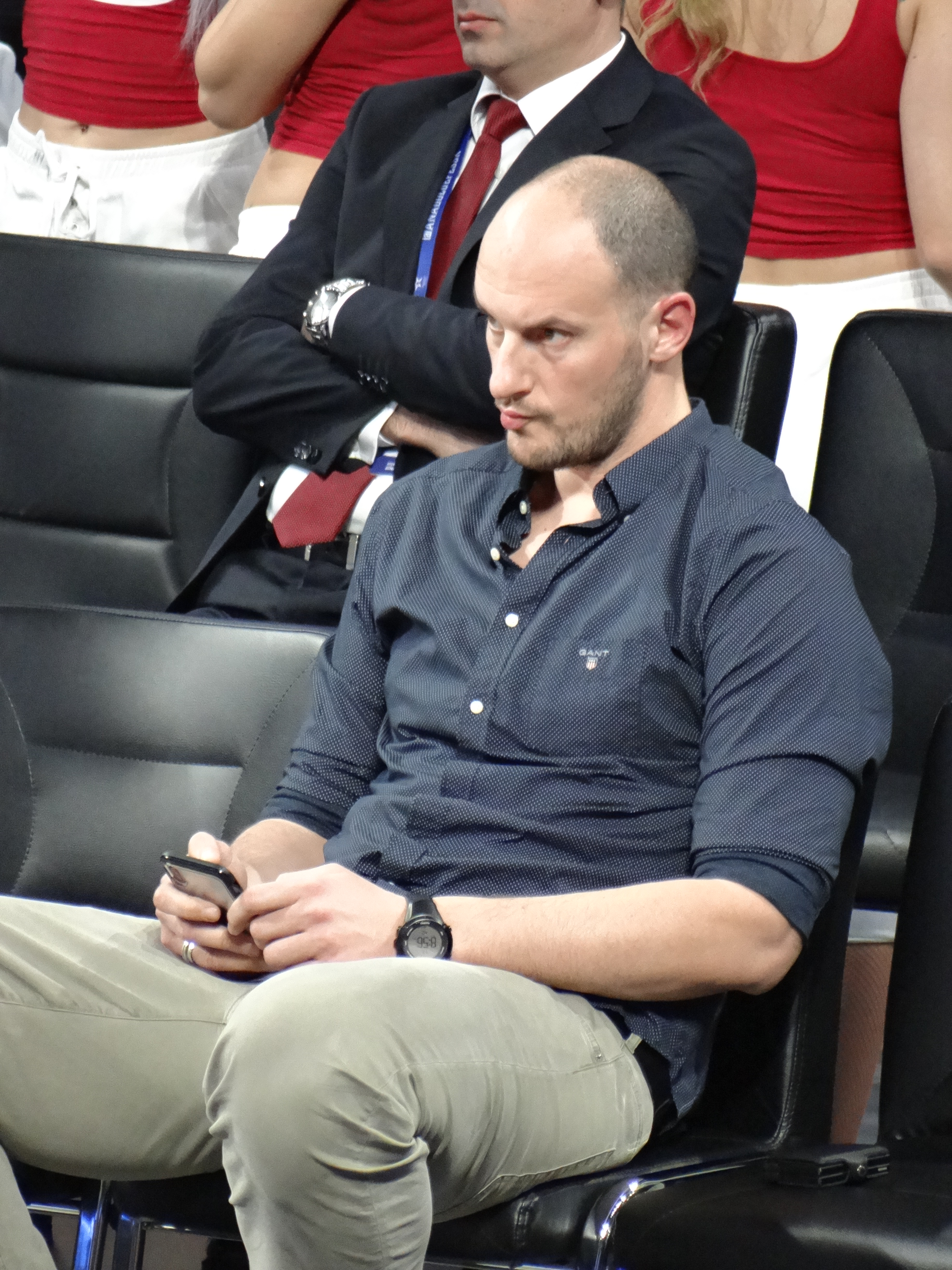
Kuqo scouting during a game between Anadolu Efes and Valencia Basket in 2018

== Personal life ==
Kuqo's father Robert and uncle Artan are basketball icons in his home country Albania. Kuqo came to Turkey when he was 15. He gained Turkish citizenship in 1997 and because of Turkish laws had to change his last name to Kurtoğlu. He used his Turkish last name Kurtoğlu when he played in the Turkish league, but in the Euroleague and other European competitions he played as "Kuqo". Ermal is married and has a son. He is fluent in Albanian, English, Spanish, Italian, Turkish, and Serbo-Croatian.

== Awards and achievements ==
- Albanian Junior Championship Champion - '94
- Slovenian League All-Star Game -'03
- Turkish President Cup Winner - '05, '06,'09
- Turkish League Regular season Champion -'04, '05, '09
- Turkish League Champion - '04, '05
- Turkish League All-Stars Game - '05, '07, '08, '11*, '13; (*did not participate due to injury)
- Turkish Cup Winner - '06, '07
- Eurobasket.com All-Turkish League Center of the Year - '11
- Eurobasket.com All-Turkish League 1st Team - '11
- Eurobasket.com All-Turkish League Domestic Players Team - '11
