= Aydan Siyavuş =

Turkish basketball player and coach

Personal information
- Born: 15 May 1947 Istanbul, Turkey
- Died: 11 January 1998 (aged 50) Silivri, Istanbul Province, Turkey

Career information
- Drafted by: Kadıköyspor
- Coaching career: 1969–1998

Career history

Coaching
- 1969-70: İTÜ
- 1970-71: Beşiktaş
- 1971-73: Kadıköyspor, Galatasaray
- 1973-75: Karşıyaka
- 1975-83: Eczacıbaş
- 1983: Fenerbahçe
- 1984-86: Efes Pilsen
- 1986-87: Beşiktaş
- 1987-90: Efes Pilsen
- 1990-91: Karşıyaka
- 1991-92: Çukurova Sanayi
- 1992: Turkey national team
- 1993-96: Galatasaray
- 1997-98: Galatasaray

Aydan Siyavuş (15 May 1947 - 11 January 1998) was a Turkish basketball coach and former basketball player. He coached a number of teams like Kadıköyspor, Eczacıbaşı, Efes Pilsen, Beşiktaş, Fenerbahçe, Çukurova, Darüşşafaka, Karşıyaka and Galatasaray as well as the youth, junior's university and senior national teams. He was the most successful head coach of the Turkish Super Basketball League.

== Private life ==
Aydan Siyavuş was born to Ali Nazima and his wife Utarit in Istanbul on 15 May 1947. He belonged to a noble and intellectual family, which descends from the Ottoman Vizier Siyavuş Pasha. His father was a journalist, and served as executive at Galatasaray S.K. and as president at Kadıköyspor. Her mother had also served as executive at Galatasaray S.K.

In November 1977, he married Nevin. He was father of two daughters, İpek and Tuğçe Siyavuş.

Siyavuş died at the age of 50 on 11 January 1998 in the state hospital in Silivri, Istanbul Province following a heart attack he contracted during a celebration in a hotel after a victorious match. He was interred at the Zincirlikuyu Cemetery in Istanbul.

== Sports career ==
=== Player ===
His sports related parents played a significant role in his choice for a sports career, particularly in basketball. Siyavuş played basketball at Kadıköyspor until 1964. At age of 17, as he should move from the youth team to the senior team, he retired from active playing, and decided to enter a coaching career. He said later that "he quit playing basketball because he saw no future as a player due to his physical disadvantage caused by his excessive eating habit".

=== Coach ===
==== Club ====
During his student years at the Faculty of Electrical Engineering of the Istanbul Technical University, he devoted himself to coaching. He began his career as the coach of his university's basketball youth team. After he made his first success by making his team won the title of the Turkey Youth Basketball Championship, he decided to drop out his engineering study in the third grade. His father was not much disappointed with Siyavuş' decision although he was an engineer's grandson. The only goal of Siyavuş became now to be a coach in the newly established Turkish Basketball League.

In the 1970–71 season, Siyavuş coached Beşiktaş J.K. team. In the early 1970s when the İstanbul Teknik Üniversitesi B.K.(İTÜ) was the sole team to win the championship title in a row, he complained about his team not exercising enough as he proposed five-day exercise to meet the modern basketball requirements. In a times, when basketball play in Turkey was considered as a hobby, he kept track of the developments in the U.S. believing it was the center of basketball and basketball is a professional sport.

Before the 1971–72 season, he left Beşiktaş J.K. team after disagreements with the team captain and the management. He took over Kadıköyspor team and the youth team of Galatasaray S.K. He made his Second League-team Kadıköyspor became champion and got promoted to the First league at the end of the season. Before the 1973–74 season, he moved to İzmir to coach the Second League-team Karşıyaka Basket. He was again successful to help the team got promoted to the First League at the end of the season. He was able to place his team at the third spot of the First League's 1974–75 season. The same season, the youth team from İzmir became under his coaching also Turkish champion.

He was transferred in the 1975–76 season by Eczacıbaşı S.K., which were promoted to the First League once season before, upon advice of its leaving coach Yalçın Granit. The team enjoyed the winning the league champion title in their second season only against the last season's champion Beşiktaş J.K. It was also Sivayuş' the first champion title in the First League. In that season, Eczacıbaşı S.K. reached also an important statistic by scoring the most points (1,858 points, 84.4 points per game) and conceding the less points (1,449 points, 65.8 points per game). The team gained a significant experience by winning five of the six matches at a tournament in the U.S., where they were invited by the University of Montana before the 1976–77 season. After winning two more consecutive league champion titles in 1976-77 and 1977–78, the team made a "three-peat" coached by Siyavuş. Eczabaşı S.K. took part in the FIBA European Champions Cup. The team finished the 1978–79 season as the runner-up losing in the newly established play-offs to Efes Pisen S.K., which took over Siyavuş' former playing team Kadıköyspor. With the help of coach Siyavuş, Eczacıbaşı S.K. managed to capture the league champion title again in the next season. They repeated their success three successive seasons of 1979–80, 1980–81, 1981-82 making their second "three-peat" in seven years.

Before the 1983–84 season, Siyavuş signed with Fenerbahçe Basketball, which had a big basketball potential. The most important point for his decision to move to Fenerbahçe S.K. was the very talented player Efe Aydan, he had a 10-year close relationship. However, already in the mid of the season, he left Fenerbahçe due to disagreements with the management, and transferred to Efes Pilsen. The team became league champion with Siyavuş in the 1983–84 season. This was his seventh and the last league champion title. Although the team missed the play-offs in the 1984–85 season, and became only runner-up in the 1085–86 season, they won the 2nd Turkish Basketball Presidential Cup in 1986.

Siyavuş coached Beşiktaş in the 1986–87 season. He returned, however, the next season to his former club Efes Pilsen signing a league three-year contract. The team were unable to be successful in the next three seasons. Their achievement to play in the quarterfinals of the 1989–90 FIBA Korać Cup was considered the greatest success of the team in Europe.

In the 1990–91 season, he was again with Karşıyaka in İzmir. The team formed by young players reached the play-offs, however, they were eliminated in the quarter-finals. In the 1991–92 season, he moved to Mersin to coach Çukurova Sanayi. The team was eliminated in the semifinals of the play-offs.

In the 1993–94 season, Galatasaray offered him ₺ 800 million (approx. USD 67,000), a very attractive sum relative to the conditions of that time. Even though the team were unable to become league champion in the following seasons, they won the gold medal at the 1994–95 Turkish Basketball Cup.

Due to health problems, he took a break as coach in the 1996–97 season. However, he remained in basketball sport reassuming the post of a technical coordinator at Darüşşafaka Basketbol. In the 1997–98 season, he returned to his former club Galatasaray but he could coach only in the first half of the league season. After a victorious match, he suffered a heart attack and died in January 1998. In an interview he gave in November 1997, he had foreboded his deadly end.

Siyavuş was the most successful coach of the Turkish Basketball Super League holding seven champion titles, a record unbroken so far since 19 years as of 2018.

==== International ====
Siyavuş was the third Turkish coach obtaining a FIBA head coach license. He coached the Turkey national youth's and the national junior's teams. he made the Turkey junior team Balkan champion in 1976. In 1977, he quit his post as the head coach of the Turkey junior's national team to concentrate on his new team Eczacıbaşı S.K. In September 1981, he was appointed head coach of the Turkey national basketball team. The national team defeated the teams of Bulgaria, Romania, Yugoslavia and Greece at the 1981 Balkan Championship held in Sofia, Bulgaria, and took the gold medal with Siyavuş. The international success and the subsequent broadcasting of television series The White Shadow in Turkey played a great role in spreading the interest in basketball in the country. The national team won the gold medal at the 1987 Mediterranean Games held in Latakia, Syria with him defeating the strong Spanish team in the final. Siyavuş retired from his post as the head coach of the Turkey national team after ten years to focus on his team Efes Pilsen.

In 1992, Siyavuş was persuaded by Yalçın Granit, the technical coordinator of national basketball teams, to take over the head coach post again. He managed the national team qualified to take part at the EuroBasket 1993 in Germany. In 1993, his post was ended by the Turkish Basketball Federation because a new regulation did not allow him to coach the national team while he was the coach of a club at the same time.

== Honours ==
=== Club ===
Turkish Youth Basketball Championship
Winners (2): İTÜ (1969-70), Karşıyaka (1973-74 )

Turkish Basketball Second League
Winners (2): Kadıköyspor (1971-72), Karşıyaka (1973-74)

Turkish Basketball First League
Winners (7): Eczacıbaşı (1975-76, 1976-77, 1977-78, 1979-80, 1980-81, 1981-82), Efes Pilsen (1983-84),
Runners-up (1): Eczacıbaşı (1978-79), Efes Pilsen (1985-86)
Third places (1): Karşıyaka (1974-75)

Turkish Basketball Presidential Cup
Winners (1): Efes Pilsen (1986)

Turkish Basketball Cup
Winners (1): Galatasaray (1994–95)

=== International ===
Turkey junior's national team
Winners (1): Balkan Junior's Basketball Championship (1976)

Turkey national team
Winners(1): Balkan Championship (1981), Mediterranean Games (1987)
