= Nihad Izić =

Bosnian basketball player and coach

Personal information
- Born: 20 June 1959 (age 67) Bijeljina, PR Bosnia and Herzegovina, Yugoslavia
- Listed height: 1.84 m (6 ft 0 in)

Career information
- NBA draft: 1981: undrafted
- Playing career: 1976–1987
- Position: Point guard
- Number: 8, 5
- Coaching career: 1990–present

Career history

Playing
- Radnik Bijeljina
- 1977–1982: Bosna
- 1982–1983: İstanbul Bankası Yenişehir
- 1983–1987: Galatasaray

Coaching
- 2000–2001: Fenerbahçe
- 2007–2012: Tofaş
Medals
Men's basketball
Representing Yugoslavia
European Championship for Juniors
Bronze medal – third place	1978 Italy	U18 Team
Head Coach for Turkey
FIBA U20 European Championship
Silver medal – second place	2006 Turkey	U20 Team
FIBA Europe Under-18 Championship
Silver medal – second place	2005 Serbia	U18 Team
Silver medal – second place	2004 Spain	U18 Team
Assistant Coach for Turkey
FIBA World Cup
Silver medal – second place	2010 Turkey	National team

Nihad Izić (Turkish: Nihat İziç; born 20 June 1959) is a Turkish-Bosnian professional basketball coach and former player.

== Playing career ==
Izić started to play basketball in his hometown team Radnik Bijeljina. Afterwards, he joined Bosna where he won an EuroLeague title for the 1978–79 season. Izić won two Yugoslav Leagues and a Yugoslav Cup with Bosnia, alongside Mirza Delibašić, Ratko Radovanović, and Žarko Varajić.

In 1982, Izić moved to Istanbul, Turkey where he played for İstanbul Bankası Yenişehir and Galatasaray. He retired as a player with Galatasaray in 1987.

== National team career ==
Izic was a member of the Yugoslavia Juniors team that won the bronze medal at the 1978 European Championship for Juniors held in Italy. Over six tournament games, he averaged 14.9 points per game.

== Coaching career ==
Izic coached Fenerbahçe during the 2000–01 TBL season.

Izic won the 2nd-tier Turkish First League in 2009 with Tofaş.

=== Turkey national teams ===
In 1994, the Turkish Basketball Federation added Izic to youth coaching staff.

Izic was the head coach of the Turkey under-18 team that won two silver medals at FIBA Europe Under-18 Championships. At the 2004 Championship in Spain, he had a 89–71 lost to Spain in the Final. At the 2005 Championship in Serbia and Montenegro, he lost in the tournament final to the host team.

Izić was the head coach of the Turkey under-20 team that won the silver medal at the 2006 FIBA Europe Under-20 Championship in İzmir, Turkey. He also led the team at the 2007 FIBA Europe Under-20 Championship.

Between 2007 and 2013, Izić was an assistant coach for the Turkey national team, under Bogdan Tanjević.

In January 2017, the Turkish Basketball Federation parted ways with Izic.

== Career achievements and awards ==
As player

- EuroLeague champion: 1 (with Bosna: 1978–79)
- Turkish Super League champion: 2 (with Galatasaray: 1984–85, 1985–86)
- Yugoslav League champion: 2 (with Bosna: 1977–78, 1979–80)
- Yugoslav Cup winner: 1 (with Bosna: 1977–78)
- Turkish President's Cup winner: 1 (with Galatasaray: 1985)

As head coach

- Turkish First League (2nd-tier) champion: 1 (with Tofaş: 2008–09)
