= Basketball at the 1987 Mediterranean Games =

The basketball tournament at the 1987 Mediterranean Games was held in Latakia, Syria.

== Medalists ==
| Event | Gold | Silver | Bronze |
|---|---|---|---|
| Men | Turkey | Spain | Greece |
| Women | Albania | Turkey | Syria |

== Men's Competition ==
=== Standings ===
| Rank | Team |
|---|---|
| 1st place, gold medalist(s) | Turkey Lütfi Arıboğan, Efe Aydan, Engin Bayav, Ömer Büyükaycan, Orhun Ene, Erman Kunter, Ferhat Oktay, Tamer Oyguç, Fatih Özal, Levent Topsakal, Emir Turam, Hakan Yörükoğlu. Coach: Aydan Siyavuş |
| 2nd place, silver medalist(s) | Spain José Álvarez López, Santi Abad, Pep Cargol, Salva Díez, Jordi Freixanet, Pablo Laso, Ferrán Martínez, Juan Ramón Marrero, Juan Antonio Morales, Juan Antonio Rosa, Carlos Ruf, Francisco Zapata. Coach: Antonio Díaz-Miguel |
| 3rd place, bronze medalist(s) | Greece under-26 Konstantinos Alexandridis, Stauros Elliniadis, Alexis Giannopoulos, Konstantinos Kalampakos, Argyris Kampouris, Christos Kountourakis, Aggelos Papadimitriou, Giannis Papagiannis, Kostas Patavoukas, Dimitris Sotiriou, Nikolaos Tzigopoulos. Coach: Efthimis Kioumourtzoglou |
| 4 | Tunisia |
| 5 | Syria Bashar Shawqi, Haitham Sharifa, Zuhair Boudaqji, Reda Jaberi, Mohammad Qudsi, Mohammad Khalifa, Mohammad Abu Saada, Iyad Barmada, Jack Bashiani, Samir Ajjan, Wadah Aqli, Jurj Shahoud. Coach: Aboud Ayoush |
| 6 | Lebanon |

== Women's Competition ==
=== Standings ===
| Rank | Team |
|---|---|
| 1st place, gold medalist(s) | Albania Xhiliola Abdullai, Edera Alibegaj, Klodeta Dibra, Nora Goxhi, Miranda Guxho, Lumturi Hoxha, Afërdita Lacaj, Pjereta Sadushi, Fiorentina Sulollari. Coach: Bashkim Milo |
| 2nd place, silver medalist(s) | Turkey Fügen Tunçok Kansak, Çiğdem Oran, Bahar Akın, Bercis Gümüşyazıcı, Zeynepgül Onay, Müge Kolday, Nil Erayda, Tülin Artırır, Pınar Baysan, Füsun Güler, Olçum Özdemir, Nurgül Karlıoğlu. Coach: Fehmi Sadıkoğlu |
| 3rd place, bronze medalist(s) | Syria Rola Jabri, Rana Ziadeh, Majda Maghamis, Hawari Baghossian, Rola Barazi, Fatima Al-Qadi, Lulu Amseh, Lamis Zalhaf, Ghada Al-Rai, Salam Allawi, Maryam Abdel Nour, Raja Al-Harithi. Coach: Iman Al-Jarrah |
| 4 | Lebanon |
