= Turgay Demirel =

Turkish basketball player and executive

4th President of FIBA Europe
- In office 17 May 2014 – 20 May 2023
- Preceded by: Cyriel Coomas
- Succeeded by: Jorge Garbajosa

President of the Turkish Basketball Federation
- In office 1992–2015
- Preceded by: Osman Solakoğlu
- Succeeded by: Harun Erdenay

Personal details
- Born: 26 September 1957 (age 69) Istanbul, Turkey
- Spouse: Şebnem Demirel (m. 1985)
- Education: Middle East Technical University
- Basketball career

Career information
- NBA draft: 1979: undrafted
- Playing career: 1975–1988
- Position: Shooting guard

Career history
- 1975–1978: Galatasaray
- 1979–1983: Yenisehir Istanbul
- 1984–1988: Galatasaray

Career highlights
- 2× Turkish Super League champion (1984, 1985)

Turgay Demirel (born 26 September 1957) is a Turkish basketball executive and former basketball player, who is the president of FIBA Europe, a vice-president of FIBA and the former president of the Turkish Basketball Federation.

== Early years ==
Demirel was born in Istanbul in 1957. He graduated from the German High School in Istanbul and studied engineering at Middle East Technical University (METU) in Ankara.

He became interested in basketball as a teenager with the support of his uncle, former national team player and Galatasaray President Prof. Dr. Ali Uras. Demirel first honed his skills on the court at the backyard of the family apartment. "My basketball story started with that hoop and after that I continued playing with my friends in summer times in Florya," Demirel has said.

== Professional career ==
His professional basketball career spanned 13 years, most of which he spent with Istanbul-based club Galatasaray. He retired as Galatasaray team captain in 1988 after having won two national championships. He also represented Turkey in international competition 41 times.

During his playing career Demirel also took his first steps towards a successful business career, which included representing international companies such as Mikasa and Reebok in Turkey.

== Basketball executive career ==
=== President of Turkish Basketball Federation ===
In 1992 he became the first elected President of the Turkish Basketball Federation. He has been re-elected six times, most recently in September 2012. He is also the Founder and President of the Foundation for Development and Education of Turkish Basketball.

Turkish basketball has undergone a dramatic transformation under Demirel's leadership. In 1992 the Turkish Basketball Federation consisted of a three-person staff with a $600,000 annual budget. In 2012, the Turkish Basketball Federation had an annual budget of $70–75 million. Basketball is the country's second-most popular sport, and Turkey has become a force in both international men's and women's basketball. The Turkish men's national team won silver at the men's EuroBasket 2001 and finished sixth in the 2006 World Championship. It won silver at the 2010 World Championship, losing in the finals to the United States in the largest sporting event ever hosted on Turkish soil. FIBA Secretary General Patrick Baumann described it as "the most successful FIBA World Championship ever." Demirel has been the recipient of many honours over the course of his career in recognition of his service to Turkish basketball. Following Turkey's success in the World Championship, Demirel was named Sportsman of the Year by the Sedat Simavi Journalists’ Association, Okan University, and Milliyet Newspaper, among others. Women's basketball in Turkey, which did not have a national team from 1968 to 1988, has also seen impressive growth and development under Demirel's watch. In 2005 the Turkish women's national team made its first appearance in the EuroBasket finals, hosted in Turkey, and have qualified for every EuroBasket since. In 2011 it won the silver medal at EuroBasket. The team made its Olympic debut in the 2012 London games and finished fifth. In 2013 it won the bronze medal at EuroBasket. Turkey has also achieved impressive success at the youth level. Most recently in 2013, the U18 men's team won the European Championship and the U20 women's team won bronze at the European Championship. In 2012 Turkey's U16 men's team won the European Championship, and the U20 women's team won bronze at the European Championship.

Additionally, Turkey has become a prominent host for international basketball competitions. The Turkish Basketball Federation has hosted or been awarded the right to host all major international basketball competitions including the 2010 FIBA Men's World Championship, the 2014 FIBA World Championship for Women, the 2012 Euroleague Women's Final 8, the 2012 Turkish Airlines Euroleague Final 4, the 2005 Women's EuroBasket, and the 2001 Men's EuroBasket. With the 2014 FIBA World Championship for Women, Turkey will become the first country to host every major FIBA men's and women's global and continental tournament. As part of the Turkish Basketball Federation's focus on developing the next generation of stars, Turkey often hosts international youth championships, including the 2013 U20 European Women's Championship and the 2006 U20 European Men's Championship. In 2012 the Turkish Basketball Federation launched a new strategic plan "Project Powerhouse" which was described by FIBA as an "impressive and dynamic strategy" that has "left nobody in any doubts as to where they [TBF] are heading in the next few years."

Demirel also has been active in the governance of European and international basketball. He is a member of the FIBA Finance Commission (2002—2014). He has served as a Vice President of FIBA Europe (2006—2010), a member of the Executive Committee (2006–2010), a board member of FIBA Europe (1994–2002 and 2006–2010), and a member of FIBA Europe's Finance Commission (1994–1998). He has served as a member of the Finance Commission (2002–2010), President of the Finance Commission (1998–2002), and a Member of the Marketing Group (1998–2002) at FIBA.

=== FIBA Europe Presidency ===
On 17 May 2014 at the FIBA Europe General Assembly, Demirel was elected President of FIBA Europe by a vote of 40–8. With his election victory he became the first Turk to lead the organization. His term runs through 2018. "My aim is to help make basketball the fastest growing sport in Europe, through support of all 51 member federations, strong club competitions and the development of a new generation of stars," Demirel said in his pre-election presentation. "A strong FIBA Europe should help all federations develop young talent as this is the cornerstone for the advancement of our sport."

== Personal life ==
Demirel and his wife Şebnem have one daughter and one son. He speaks English and German in addition to his native Turkish.
