= Oktay Mahmuti =

Turkish basketball head coach

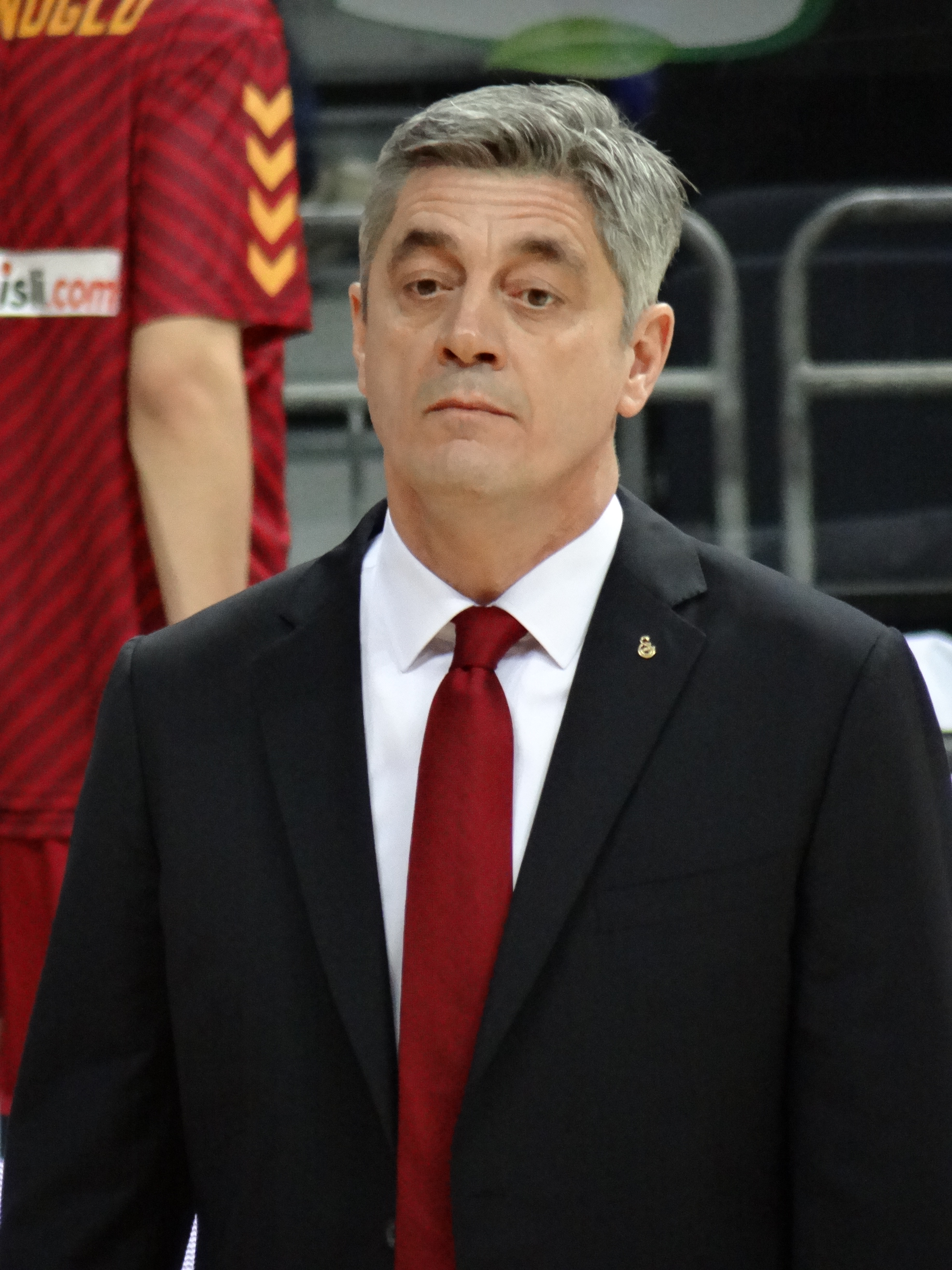
- Mahmuti, in 2018.

Free Agent
- Position: Head coach

Personal information
- Born: 6 March 1968 (age 58) Skopje, SR Macedonia, SFR Yugoslavia
- Coaching career: 1991–present

Career history
- 1991–1992: Eczacıbaşı (youth)
- 1992–2001: Efes Pilsen (assistant)
- 2001–2007: Efes Pilsen
- 2007–2009: Benetton Treviso
- 2010–2012: Galatasaray
- 2012–2013: Anadolu Efes
- 2014–2016: Darüşşafaka
- 2018: Galatasaray

Career highlights
- EuroCup Coach of the Year (2009); 4× TBSL champion (2002–2005); 4× Turkish Cup winner (2001, 2002, 2006, 2007); 2× Turkish President's Cup winner (2006, 2011)

Oktay Mahmuti (Macedonian: Октај Махмути; Albanian: Oktaj Mahmuti; born 6 March 1968) is a Turkish-Macedonian professional basketball coach of Albanian origin. Mahmuti is well-known for coaching defense, particularly during his time with Efes and Benetton Treviso. He is currently unemployed.

== Coaching career ==
In 1992, Mahmuti began his professional level coaching career with Efes Pilsen. On 12 January 2018, Mahmuti was named the head coach of Galatasaray, of the Turkish Basketball Super League (BSL).

== Personal life ==
Mahmuti was born to Albanian parents living in Skopje. Mahmuti graduated from Istanbul University Faculty of Pharmacy.

== Honors ==
=== Club ===
Efes Pilsen

- Turkish Super League Champion (4): 2001–02, 2002–03, 2003–04, 2004–05
- Turkish Cup Winner (4): 2001, 2002, 2006, 2007
- Turkish Cup Runner-Up (1): 2004
- Turkish President's Cup Winner (1): 2006
- EuroLeague Quarter-finalist (3): 2004–05, 2005–06, 2012–13
- SuproLeague: Final Four (1): 2001

Benetton Treviso

- EuroCup Final eight (1): 2008–09

Galatasaray Medical Park

- Turkish President's Cup Winner (1): 2011

=== Personal ===
Benetton Treviso

- EuroCup Coach of the Year: 2008–09

Anadolu Efes

- 100th win in European competitions with Anadolu Efes
