= 1968–69 Galatasaray S.K. (men's basketball) season =

Galatasaray SK
1968–69 season
- Chairman: (Turkey) Selahattin Beyazıt
- Manager: (Turkey) Petar Simenov
- Turkish Basketball League: 1st

Galatasaray SK Men's 1968–1969 season is the 1968–1969 basketball season for Turkish professional basketball club Galatasaray SK.

== Depth chart ==
Pos.	Starting 5	Bench 1	Bench 2
C	Nedret Uyguç	Fuat Tahir
PF	Nur Danişment	Nedim Hoşgör	Mehmet Tümer
SF	Şengün Kaplanoğlu	Semih Dedeoğlu	Ercüment Tameröz
SG	Necdet İmre	Kaya Başaran	Ferhan İmren
PG	İzzet Sürücü	Ethem Ekerbiçer	Ilgaz Köksal

== Regular season ==
Pos	Team	Total					
		Pts	Pld	W	L	F	A
1	Galatasaray SK	78	28	25	3	2267	1843
2	İTÜ B.K.	74	28	22	4	2304	1835
3	TED Ankara Kolejliler	72	28	22	5	2052	1642
4	Altınordu	66	28	19	9	2260	1949
5	Karagücü	66	28	18	8	2094	1884
6	Fenerbahçe SK	63	28	17	10	2204	1039
7	Beşiktaş JK	61	28	16	11	1921	1761
8	Muhafızgücü	61	28	15	10	2020	1869
9	Modaspor	51	28	11	16	1648	1769
10	PTT İstanbul	49	28	10	17	1815	1907
11	Altay	48	28	9	17	1881	2027
12	Suspor	46	28	9	19	1845	2134
13	Kadıköyspor	42	28	7	21	1792	2105
14	Jandarmagücü	32	28	2	26	1453	2044
15	Göztepe SK	30	28	1	27	1440	2188

Pts=Points, Pld=Matches played, W=Matches won, L=Matches lost, F=Points for, A=Points against

=== Matches ===
1st Half

October 19, 1968
17:30 TSI

[ (Report)]

Galatasaray SK	83–77	PTT İstanbul

Lütfü Kırdar, Istanbul
Attendance: unknown

October 23, 1968
17:30 TSI

[ (Report)]

Galatasaray SK	76–74	İTÜ B.K.
Pts: Şengün 31, Nedret 22		Pts: Reşat 26

Lütfü Kırdar, Istanbul
Attendance: unknown

October 26, 1968
17:30 TSI

[ (Report)]

Galatasaray SK	75–62	Beşiktaş JK
Pts: Şengün 23, Fuat 16		Pts: Ümit 21

Lütfü Kırdar, Istanbul
Attendance: unknown

October 27, 1968
17:30 TSI

[ (Report)]

Galatasaray SK	85–77	Fenerbahçe SK
Scoring by half: 34–36, 51–41
Pts: Nedret 19, Semih 18		Pts: Hüseyin 29

Lütfü Kırdar, Istanbul
Attendance: unknown

November 8, 1968
20:30 TSI

[(Report)]

Suspor	63–74	Galatasaray SK
Pts: Hakkı Baruer 34		Pts: Nedim Hoşgör 14, Nedret Uyguç 15

Atatürk Spor Salonu, Ankara
Attendance: unknown

November 9, 1968
20:30 TSI

[(Report)]

Muhafızgücü	52–59	Galatasaray SK
Scoring by half: 28–27, 24–32
Pts: Zeki 15		Pts: Nedret 18, Şengün 12, Semih 12

Atatürk Spor Salonu, Ankara
Attendance: unknown

November 16, 1968
20:30 TSI

[(Report)]

Altay	49–70	Galatasaray SK
Pts: Ersin 16		Pts: Nedret 15, Şengün 21

Atatürk Spor Salonu, İzmir
Attendance: unknown

November 17, 1968
21:00 TSI

[(Report)]

Altınordu	63–59	Galatasaray SK
Scoring by half: 28–35, 35–24
Pts: Halil 17, Hüseyin Alp 11, İren 15, James 14		Pts: Nur 10, Nedim 2, Nedret 9, Şengün 9, Semih 15, Fuat 8, Necdet 6

Atatürk Spor Salonu, İzmir
Attendance: unknown

December 7, 1968
21:00 TSI

[(Report)]

Kadıköyspor	71–87	Galatasaray SK

Lütfü Kırdar, İzmir
Attendance: unknown

January 5, 1969
17:30 TSI

[ (Report)]

Galatasaray SK	81–52	Jandarmagücü
Scoring by half: 46–27, 35–25

Lütfü Kırdar, Istanbul
Attendance: unknown

January 19, 1969
17:30 TSI

[ (Report)]

Galatasaray SK	53–50	TED Kolejliler
Pts: Nur 13		Pts: Gürcan 12

Lütfü Kırdar, Istanbul
Attendance: unknown

January 26, 1969
17:30 TSI

[ (Report)]

Galatasaray SK	86–47	Göztepe SK
Pts: Semih 24, Şengün 18		Pts: Şükrü 14

Lütfü Kırdar, Istanbul
Attendance: unknown

February 8, 1969
20:30 TSI

[(Report)]

Karagücü	71–75	Galatasaray SK
Scoring by half: 41–41, 30–34
Pts: Erdal 22, Haluk 21		Pts: Şengün 21, Nedim 18

Atatürk Spor Salonu, Ankara
Attendance: unknown

2nd Half

March 8, 1969
20:00 TSI

[ (Report)]

Galatasaray SK	90–75	Altınordu
Pts: Şengün 24, Semih 19		Pts: Hüseyin 24, Halil 14

Lütfü Kırdar, Istanbul
Attendance: unknown

March 9, 1969
20:00 TSI

[ (Report)]

Galatasaray SK	85–65	Kadıköyspor

Lütfü Kırdar, Istanbul
Attendance: unknown

March 12, 1969
17:30 TSI

[ (Report)]

Galatasaray SK	80–65	Beşiktaş JK
Scoring by half: 41–33, 39–32
Pts: Nedret 6, Fuat 14, Şengün 24, Nur 6, Semih 12, Nedim 15, İzzet 1		Pts: Necmi 13, ünal 13, Battal 17

Lütfü Kırdar, Istanbul
Attendance: unknown

March 15, 1969
20:30 TSI

[(Report)]

İTÜ B.K.	86–74	Galatasaray SK
Scoring by half: 37–36, 49–38
Pts: Reşat 26, Kemal 19		Pts: Nedret 16, Semih 16

Lütfü Kırdar, Istanbul
Attendance: unknown

March 16, 1969
20:30 TSI

[(Report)]

Modaspor	70–69	Galatasaray SK
Scoring by half: 28–38, 42–31
Pts: Sedat 24, Aybulak 12		Pts: Nedret 15, Nedim 13

Lütfü Kırdar, Istanbul
Attendance: unknown

March 19, 1969
17:30 TSI

[ (Report)]

Galatasaray SK	93–64	PTT İstanbul
Pts: Şengün 26, Nur 20, Nedim 21		Pts: Tülay 13

Lütfü Kırdar, Istanbul
Attendance: unknown

March 22, 1969
19:00 TSI

[ (Report)]

Galatasaray SK	104–79	Fenerbahçe SK
Pts: Şengün 26, Nur 20		Pts: Hüseyin 24, Tuncer 19

Lütfü Kırdar, Istanbul
Attendance: unknown

March 29, 1969
19:00 TSI

[ (Report)]

Galatasaray SK	104–81	Suspor

Lütfü Kırdar, Istanbul
Attendance: unknown

March 30, 1969
19:00 TSI

[ (Report)]

Galatasaray SK	81–73	Muhafızgücü

Lütfü Kırdar, Istanbul
Attendance: unknown

May 4, 1969
20:30 TSI

[ (Report)]

Galatasaray SK	90–80	Karagücü

Lütfü Kırdar, Istanbul
Attendance: unknown

May 10, 1969
20:30 TSI

[ (Report)]

Galatasaray SK	99–59	Jandarmagücü

Lütfü Kırdar, Istanbul
Attendance: unknown

May 11, 1969
20:30 TSI

[ (Report)]

Galatasaray SK	92–63	Altay SK

Lütfü Kırdar, Istanbul
Attendance: unknown

June 7, 1969
20:30 TSI

[ (Report)]

Göztepe SK	62–104	Galatasaray SK

Lütfü Kırdar, Istanbul
Attendance: unknown

June 7, 1969
20:30 TSI

[ (Report)]

Galatasaray SK	63–59	TED Ankara Kolejliler
Scoring by half: 34–26, 29–33
Pts: Şengün 17, Nur 15		Pts: Nur 21, Serdar 12

Lütfü Kırdar, Istanbul
Attendance: unknown

Galatasaray won the league.

=== Turkish Cup ===
==== İstanbul Qualification Tour ====
February 12, 1969
20:30 TSI

[ (Report)]

Galatasaray SK	80–61	Kurtuluş SK

Lütfü Kırdar, Istanbul
Attendance: unknown

February 26, 1969
20:30 TSI

[ (Report)]

Galatasaray SK	106–83	Kadıköyspor
Pts: Şengün 16, Fuat 21		Pts: Talha 22

Lütfü Kırdar, Istanbul
Attendance: unknown

==== Samsun Semi-final Tour ====
April 16, 1969
20:30 TSI

[ (Report)]

Galatasaray SK	96–60	Samsunspor

Samsun
Attendance: unknown

April 17, 1969
20:30 TSI

[ (Report)]

Galatasaray SK	64–53	TED Kolejliler
Pts: -		Pts: -

Istanbul
Attendance: unknown

==== Turkish Cup Final ====
June 15, 1969
20:00 TSI

[ (Report)]

Galatasaray SK	56–64	İTÜ B.K.
Scoring by half: 33–31, 22–33
Pts: Reşat 26, Nikolic 12, Ünal 13		Pts: Nedim 13

Lütfü Kırdar, Istanbul
Attendance: unknown

=== FIBA European Champions Cup ===
November 6, 1969
20:00 TSI

[ (Report)]

EK Engelmann	100–74	Galatasaray SK
Scoring by half: 52–46, 48–28
Pts: Holleri 30, Tecka 18, Hottmann 18, Leskova 17		Pts: Nedret 19, Fuat 18, Semih 12, Nur 11

Hyeqasee, Austria
Attendance: unknown
Referees: (Italy) Corzani, (Romania) Chrlov

November 12, 1969
20:00 TSI

[ (Report)]

Galatasaray SK	70–49	EK Engelmann
Scoring by half: 34–23, 36–26
Pts: Şengün 29, Nur 14, Fuat 10		Pts: Tecka 16, Hottmann 12

Lütfü Kırdar, Istanbul
Attendance: unknown
Referees: (Greece) Panaiotis Evangelos, (Italy) Francesco Bianchi
