= 1984 in basketball =

The following are the basketball events of the year 1984 throughout the world.

== Player awards (NBA) ==
=== Regular-season MVP ===
- Larry Bird, Boston Celtics

=== NBA finals MVP ===
- Larry Bird, Boston Celtics

=== Slam Dunk Contest ===
- Larry Nance, Phoenix Suns

== Collegiate awards ==
- Men
  - John R. Wooden Award: Michael Jordan, North Carolina
  - Frances Pomeroy Naismith Award: Ricky Stokes, Virginia
  - Associated Press College Basketball Player of the Year: Michael Jordan, North Carolina
  - NCAA basketball tournament Most Outstanding Player: Ed Pinckney, Villanova
  - Associated Press College Basketball Coach of the Year: Ray Meyer, DePaul
  - Naismith Outstanding Contribution to Basketball: Ray Meyer
- Women
  - Naismith College Player of the Year: Cheryl Miller, USC
  - Wade Trophy: Janice Lawrence Braxton, Louisiana Tech
  - Frances Pomeroy Naismith Award: Kim Mulkey, Louisiana Tech
  - NCAA basketball tournament Most Outstanding Player: Cheryl Miller, USC

== Naismith Memorial Basketball Hall of Fame ==
- Class of 1984:
  - Jack Gardner
  - John Havlicek
  - Sam Jones

== Births ==
- May 28 – Carmelo Anthony
- December 30 – LeBron James

== Deaths ==
- January 30 – Lloyd Sharrar, All-American college player (West Virginia) (born 1936)
- March 3 – Jack Moore, American college player (Nebraska) (born 1959)
- May 30 – Tex Gibbons, American Olympic gold medalist (1936) (born 1907)
- November 21 – Ben Wilson, American high school player (born 1967)
- December 11 – Nate Bowman, American NBA/ABA player (born 1943)

== See also ==
- 1984 in sports
