= 1986 in basketball =

The following are the basketball events of the year 1986 throughout the world.

== Player awards (NBA) ==
=== Regular season MVP ===
- Larry Bird, Boston Celtics

=== NBA Finals MVP ===
- Larry Bird, Boston Celtics

=== Slam Dunk Contest ===
- Spud Webb, Atlanta Hawks

=== Three-point Shootout ===
- Larry Bird, Boston Celtics

== Collegiate awards ==
- Men
  - John R. Wooden Award: Walter Berry, St. John's
  - Frances Pomeroy Naismith Award: Jim Les, Bradley
  - Associated Press College Basketball Player of the Year: Walter Berry, St. John's
  - NCAA basketball tournament Most Outstanding Player: Keith Smart, Indiana
  - Associated Press College Basketball Coach of the Year: Eddie Sutton, Kentucky
  - Naismith Outstanding Contribution to Basketball: Adolph Rupp
- Women
  - Naismith College Player of the Year: Cheryl Miller, USC
  - Wade Trophy: Kamie Ethridge, Texas
  - Frances Pomeroy Naismith Award: Kamie Ethridge, Texas
  - NCAA basketball tournament Most Outstanding Player: Clarissa Davis, Texas
  - Carol Eckman Award: Laura Mapp, Bridgewater

== Naismith Memorial Basketball Hall of Fame ==
- Class of 1986:
  - Billy Cunningham
  - Tom Heinsohn
  - Red Holzman
  - Fred Taylor
  - Stan Watts

== Births ==
- May 7—Matee Ajavon American college basketball player (Rutgers) and the WNBA (Atlanta Dream)

== Deaths ==
- June 19 – Len Bias, American college player (Maryland) and Boston Celtics draft pick (born 1963)
- December 1 – Halbert Harvill, American college men's coach (Austin Peay) (born 1893)

== See also ==
- 1986 in sports
