= Efe Aydan =

Turkish basketball player (born 1955)

Personal information
- Born: May 4, 1955 (age 71) Ankara, Turkey
- Listed height: 6 ft 8 in (2.03 m)
- Listed weight: 215 lb (98 kg)

Career information
- Playing career: 1971–1992
- Position: Center
- Number: 13

Career history
- 1971–1973: Galatasaray
- 1973–1975: Karşıyaka
- 1975–1982: Eczacıbaşı
- 1982–1986: Fenerbahçe
- 1986–1987: Beşiktaş
- 1987–1988: Paşabahçe
- 1988–1992: Tofaş

Career highlights
- FIBA European Selection (1981); 6× Turkish League champion (1976–1978, 1980–1982)

Ahmet Efe Aydan (born May 4, 1955 in Ankara, Turkey) is a Turkish former professional basketball player. He is regarded by many as the best Turkish basketball player ever, with a total of 224 caps with the senior Turkish national team. He was Turkey's national team captain in 89 games, and he scored 2,195 points with the senior Turkish national team.

With Turkey's national team, he won the gold medal at the 1981 Balkan Championship, and the gold medal at the 1987 Mediterranean Games. On the club level, he won the Turkish League championship 6 times. Aydan was also the first Turkish basketball player to play on the FIBA European Selection (the All-European Team), in 1981, where he displayed a memorable performance in a game against the Spanish ACB League club Joventut Badalona.

== Professional career ==
The ambitious Aydan started playing basketball in the youth ranks of Galatasaray Istanbul, when he was 16 years old. Because of his talent and ability, he was signed by Eczacibasi Istanbul, and he played with that club for several years. He earned himself a place on the FIBA European Selection (All-European Team), in 1981. He retired from playing pro club basketball in 1992, while he was a member of the Turkish club Tofas Bursa.

=== Domestic fame ===
Aydan is often cited as being the pioneer of Turkish basketball. He has a legendary status with Turkish basketball fans, and he is generally considered to be the top Turkish basketball idol of all time. Many basketball historians believe that Aydan was a very underrated player, and that he could have been among the most well-remembered European players of his time, if he had played in a bigger EuroLeague club than the ones he played in. During his playing career, Turkish club basketball lacked in quality, which caused Aydan to be relatively unknown outside of Turkey, at the time.

== National team career ==
Aydan became a regular player of the senior Turkish national team, as he played at the 1975 EuroBasket and 1981 EuroBasket. In both tournaments, Aydan was declared the most valuable player of the national team. He also led Turkey to their first ever international title, as they defeated Bulgaria, in the final of the Balkan Championship, in 1981, with Aydan again being the Turkish team's most valuable player.

== Honours and awards ==
=== Club ===
- 6× Turkish League Champion: (1976, 1977, 1978, 1980, 1981, 1982)
- FIBA European Selection: (1981)

=== Turkish senior national team ===
- 1981 Balkan Championship: Gold
- 1983 Mediterranean Games: Bronze
- 1987 Mediterranean Games: Gold

== Personal life ==
Aydan is the son of Turkish opera singer Sevda Aydan, and the older brother of Turkish actor Ege Aydan.
