= Paul Dawkins =

Turkish-American basketball player (1957–2019)

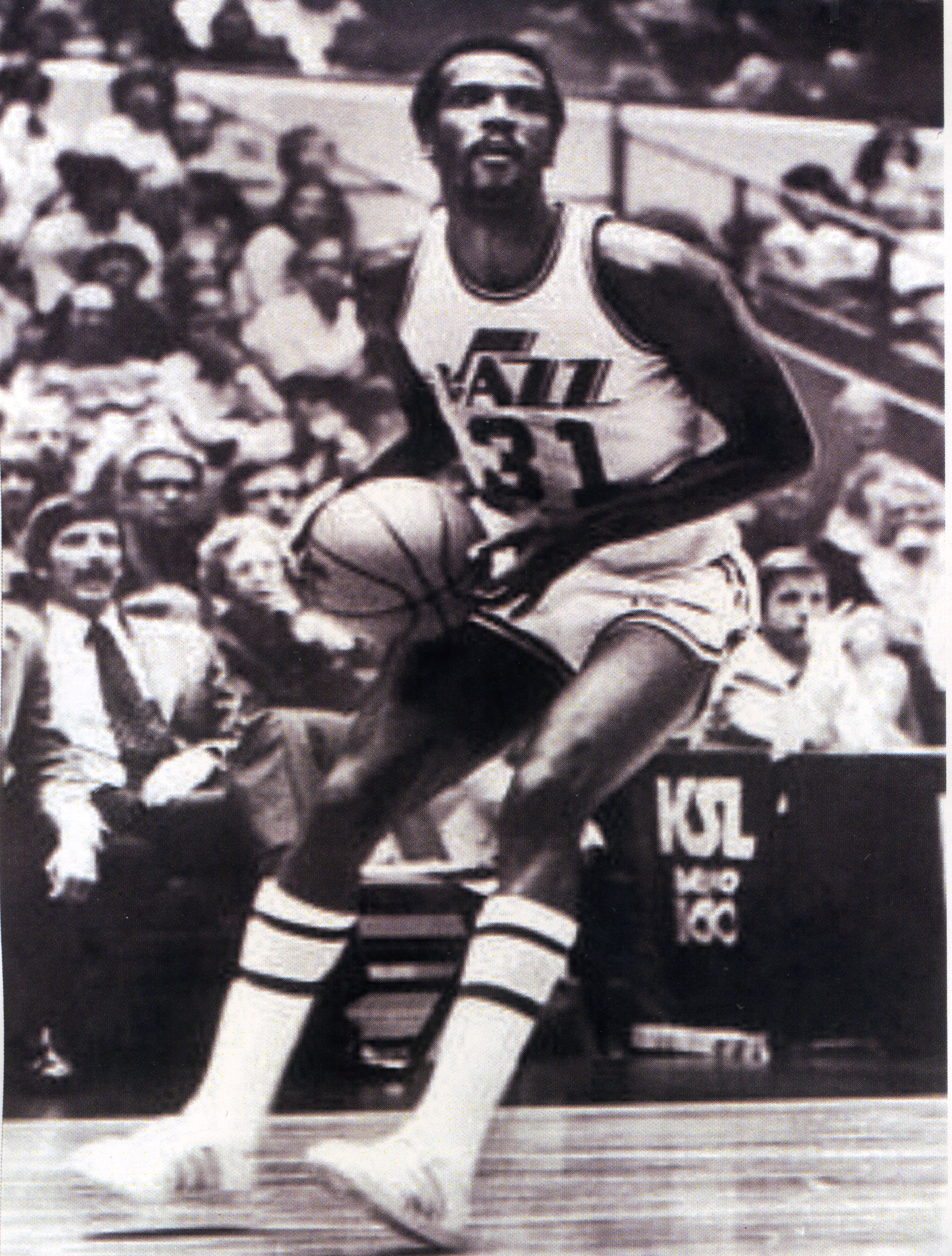

Personal information
- Born: June 10, 1957 Saginaw, Michigan, U.S.
- Died: March 25, 2019 (aged 61) Dallas, Texas, U.S.
- Listed height: 6 ft 5 in (1.96 m)
- Listed weight: 200 lb (91 kg)

Career information
- High school: Saginaw (Saginaw, Michigan)
- College: Northern Illinois (1975–1979)
- NBA draft: 1979: 10th round, 185th overall pick
- Drafted by: Utah Jazz
- Playing career: 1979–1990
- Position: Small forward / shooting guard
- Number: 31

Career history
- 1979–1980: Utah Jazz
- 1980–1981: Anchorage Northern Knights
- 1981–1990: Galatasaray

Career highlights
- 3× Turkish League champion (1985, 1986, 1990); Turkish Supercup winner (1985); 2× Turkish League Top Scorer (1985, 1986); MAC Player of the Year (1979); 3× First-team All-MAC (1977–1979)
- Stats at NBA.com
- Stats at Basketball Reference

Paul Lamar Dawkins (June 10, 1957 – March 25, 2019) was an American-Turkish professional basketball player, who played for the Utah Jazz of the National Basketball Association (NBA), appearing in 57 games. He was inducted into the Northern Illinois University Athletics Hall of Fame in 1991. In 2007, he was also inducted into the Saginaw County Sports Hall of Fame.

== Early years ==
Dawkins was the third of five siblings born in 1957 in Saginaw, Michigan to parents Willie and Ollie Dawkins. Growing up on Saginaw's east side, he attended Heavenrich Elementary along with older siblings Willie and Patricia, and younger brother Robert. Paul developed a love for basketball early on at the age of 9, but his only opportunities to play were at the school's gym. So he fashioned a rim out of coat hangers, attached a net and hung it inside of the family's garage. It was inside the garage where Paul developed his sweet left-handed shooting touch, spending countless hours swishing a volleyball through the makeshift rim. He was unbeatable whether one-on-one or two-on-two, taking on neighborhood friends and brother Robert. Paul parlayed his hoop passion into starting on Heavenrich's fourth through sixth grade teams. Next he attended Central Junior High School and starred as a scorer, leading the eighth and ninth grade teams to city championships. Growing to 6’5, he stood out with the Saginaw High School varsity team in his junior and senior years, earning All-Saginaw Valley League Honors. After deciding to attend Northern Illinois university in the fall of 1975, Paul would blossom into one of the finest shooters in the nation.

== College career ==
Dawkins attended Northern Illinois University from 1975–79, and graduated as the school's all-time leading scorer, with 1,749 points. As a senior in 1978–79, he was the Mid-American Conference Player of the Year, and finished 5th in the nation in scoring, at 26.7 points per game.

Given the nickname "Doctor D" by Huskies fans, he earned All-MAC honors three times (First-Team in 1977–79 and honorable mention in 1976–77) and MAC Player of the Week, plus repeat team co-captain and Most Valuable Player (1977–79). Paul was named on the All-Time Chick Evans Field House team in 1997, and NIU's All-Century team in 2000–01. He finished with at least seven school records, including season points (695), career points (1,749), season field goals (291), career field goals (751), and season scoring average (26.7).

== Professional career ==
Following his collegiate career, Dawkins was drafted in the 10th round, of the 1979 NBA draft, by the Utah Jazz. Dawkins appeared in 57 NBA games, while averaging 13.6 minutes and 5.5 points per game. He scored 30 points in one half, during a game against the Portland Trail Blazers, making 13 of 15 shots from the field. Dawkins played for the Anchorage Northern Knights of the Continental Basketball Association during the 1980–81 season.

He played in the Turkish Super League with Galatasaray, between 1982 and 1990, and was also given Turkish citizenship. He led his team to three Turkish League championships in 1984–85, 1985–86, and 1989–90. During the 1982–83 season, he averaged 37 points per game, and he had an eight-year career average of over 31 points per game in the Turkish League.

== Career statistics ==
Legend
GP	Games played	GS	Games started	MPG	Minutes per game
FG%	Field goal percentage	3P%	3-point field goal percentage	FT%	Free throw percentage
RPG	Rebounds per game	APG	Assists per game	SPG	Steals per game
BPG	Blocks per game	PPG	Points per game	**Bold**	Career high

=== NBA ===
==== Regular season ====
Year	Team	GP	MPG	FG%	3P%	FT%	RPG	APG	SPG	BPG	PPG
1979–80	Utah	57	13.6	.470	.200	.688	2.2	1.4	.6	.2	5.5
