= Eczacıbaşı S.K. (men's basketball) =

Eczacıbaşı
- Founded: 1968
- Dissolved: 1992
- History: 1968 – 1992
- Arena: Eczacıbaşı Spor Salonu
- Capacity: 1,700
- Location: Istanbul, Turkey
- Team colors: Blue, white
- Championships: 8 Turkish Championships; 1 Turkish Presidential Cup; 2 Turkish League 2
- Website: eczacibasisporkulubu.org.tr/
Home	Away

Eczacıbaşı SK men's basketball team (English: Eczacıbaşı Sports Club), commonly known as Eczacıbaşı, was the professional basketball department of Eczacıbaşı SK, a sports club based in Istanbul, Turkey. The team competed in the Turkish Basketball Super League.

== History ==
The men's basketball team of Eczacıbaşı SK was established in 1968 as the basketball section of the Turkish industrial group of companies Eczacıbaşı Holding, and began competing in the lower Turkish basketball divisions. The club soon became one of the most successful teams in Turkey, having won the Turkish Basketball League twice (1974, 1991) and most importantly eight times the Turkish Basketball Super League afterwards. Eczacıbaşı also won the Presidential Cup in 1988 against Fenerbahçe.

At the start of the 1992-93 season the board of Eczacıbaşı SK took the decision that ended their basketball department activities on 3 August 1992 (1992 because of falling for the second time), and the team was disbanded by announcing its withdrawal from the league.

== Honours ==
- Turkish Super League

Winners (8): 1975–76, 1976–77, 1977–78, 1979–80, 1980–81, 1981–82, 1987–88, 1988–89
Runners-up (1): 1978–79

- Turkish Presidential Cup

Winners (1): 1988
Runners-up (1): 1989

- Turkish League 2

Winners (2):1973–74, 1990–91

== Head coaches ==
- (Turkey) Aydan Siyavuş: (1975-83)
