= 1985 in basketball =

The following are the basketball events of the year 1985 throughout the world.

== National team competitions ==
=== 1986 FIBA Basketball World Cup Qualifiers ===
- 1985 FIBA Asia Cup* at Malaysia:
  (gold) Philippines (5th title)
  (silver) South Korea
  (bronze) China
  EuroBasket 1985 at West Germany:
  (gold) Soviet Union (14th title)
  (silver) Czechoslovakia
  (bronze) Italy
  AfroBasket 1985 at Ivory Coast:
  (gold) Ivory Coast (2nd title)
  (silver) Angola
  (bronze) Egypt

Notes:

(*) — The remaining four teams vied for the championship. Nevertheless, the Philippines clinch the title with a 3-0 win–loss record in the championship round as opposed to the 2-1 of South Korea and 1-2 record of China.

== Player awards (NBA) ==
=== Regular season MVP ===
- Larry Bird, Boston Celtics

=== NBA Finals MVP ===
- Kareem Abdul-Jabbar, Los Angeles Lakers

=== Slam Dunk Contest ===
- Dominique Wilkins, Atlanta Hawks

== Collegiate awards ==
- Men
  - John R. Wooden Award: Chris Mullin, St. John's
  - Frances Pomeroy Naismith Award: Bubba Jennings, Texas Tech
  - Associated Press College Basketball Player of the Year: Patrick Ewing, Georgetown
  - NCAA basketball tournament Most Outstanding Player: Pervis Ellison, Louisville
  - Associated Press College Basketball Coach of the Year: Bill Frieder, Michigan
  - Naismith Outstanding Contribution to Basketball: Hank Iba
- Women
  - Naismith College Player of the Year: Cheryl Miller, USC
  - Wade Trophy: Cheryl Miller, USC
  - Frances Pomeroy Naismith Award: Maria Stack, Gonzaga
  - NCAA basketball tournament Most Outstanding Player: Tracy Claxton, Old Dominion

== Naismith Memorial Basketball Hall of Fame ==
- Class of 1985:
  - Harold Anderson
  - Al Cervi
  - Marv Harshman
  - Nate Thurmond
  - Margaret Wade

== Deaths ==
- May 18 — Win Wilfong, 52, American NBA player (St. Louis Hawks, Cincinnati Royals)
- August 8 — Bobby Laughlin, 74, American college coach (Morehead State)
- September — Louie Sauer, American NBL player (Kankakee Gallagher Trojans)
- September 2 — Bob Kinney, 64, American NBA player (Fort Wayne Pistons)
- November 6 — Harold Bradley, 73, American college coach (Duke, Texas)

== See also ==
- 1985 in sports
