= Galatasaray S.K. (men's basketball) =

Galatasaray MCT Technic
- 2026–27 Galatasaray S.K. (men's basketball) season
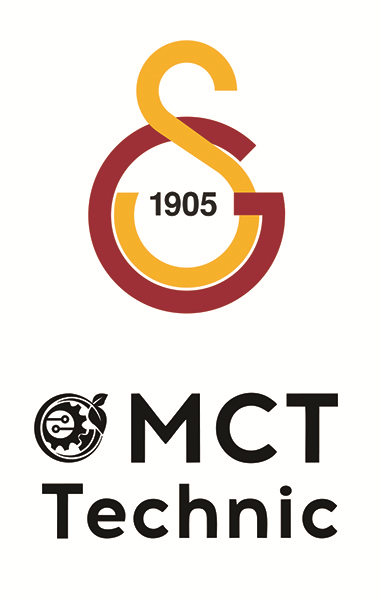
- Nickname: Sarı Kırmızılılar (The Yellow-Reds); The Lions
- Leagues: Basketbol Süper Ligi; Champions League
- Founded: 1911; 115 years ago
- History: Galatasaray (1911–present)
- Arena: Sinan Erdem Dome
- Capacity: 16,000
- Location: Istanbul, Turkey
- Team colors: Yellow, red
- President: Dursun Özbek
- Head coach: Manuchar Markoishvili
- Team captain: Buğrahan Tuncer
- Championships: 1 EuroCup; 18 Turkish Championships (13 pre-1967); 3 Turkish Cups; 2 Turkish President's Cups
- Website: galatasaray.org
Home	Away	Third

Galatasaray S.K. is a professional basketball team based in the city of Istanbul in Turkey. It is a part of the Galatasaray Sports Club. The team competes in the Turkish Basketball Super League and Basketball Champions League. The team has won 18 Turkish championships (5 titles in the Turkish Super League, 11 titles in the former Turkish Basketball Championship and 2 titles in the former Spring Cup). The team furthermore won 3 Turkish Cups, 2 Turkish Super Cups, and 1 EuroCup.

== History ==
According to the official records, in Turkey, basketball was first played in 1904 at Robert College. An American physical education teacher laid the foundations of this sport in Turkey. 7 years later, Ahmet Robenson, a physical education teacher in Galatasaray High School decided to introduce a new game to students in 1911. Robenson, who also became a Galatasaray S.K. president later, popularized this sport in Turkey.

The team has won 16 national championship titles and 15 İstanbul League titles. Former president of the club, Özhan Canaydın was a former player of the basketball team. The team dominated Turkish basketball in the 1940s, and won titles in the 1950s and 1960s, while remaining a competitive team in the 1970s. In the 1980s, Galatasaray won two more championships, in 1985 and 1986, and won the 1990 title. For much of the 1990s and 2000s, Galatasaray struggled. In 2013, Galatasaray won back the Turkish championship.

On 24 June 2011, Galatasaray announced that Cafe Crown's sponsorship was over.

Galatasaray qualified for the EuroLeague for the first time in history after winning the qualification knockout round that gained them a place in the EuroLeague season.

On April 27, 2016, Galatasaray defeated SIG Strasbourg with the score of 78–67 at Abdi Ipekci Arena in the second leg of the 2016 EuroCup Finals. With this result Galatasaray won the EuroCup championship for the first time.

In the 2024–25 season, Galatasaray played in the FIBA-organised Basketball Champions League, and played in its second ever European final. They lost to Unicaja Málaga in the final in Athens.

== Previous names ==
Period	Previous names	Ref.
1911–2005	Galatasaray	
2005–2011	Galatasaray Cafe Crown	
2011–2013	Galatasaray Medical Park	
2013–2015	Galatasaray Liv Hospital	
2015–2018	Galatasaray Odeabank	
2018–2019	Galatasaray	
2019–2020	Galatasaray Doğa Sigorta	
2020–2021	Galatasaray	
2021–2023	Galatasaray Nef	
2023–2024	Galatasaray Ekmas	
2024–2025	Galatasaray	
2025–present	Galatasaray MCT Technic	

== Home courts ==
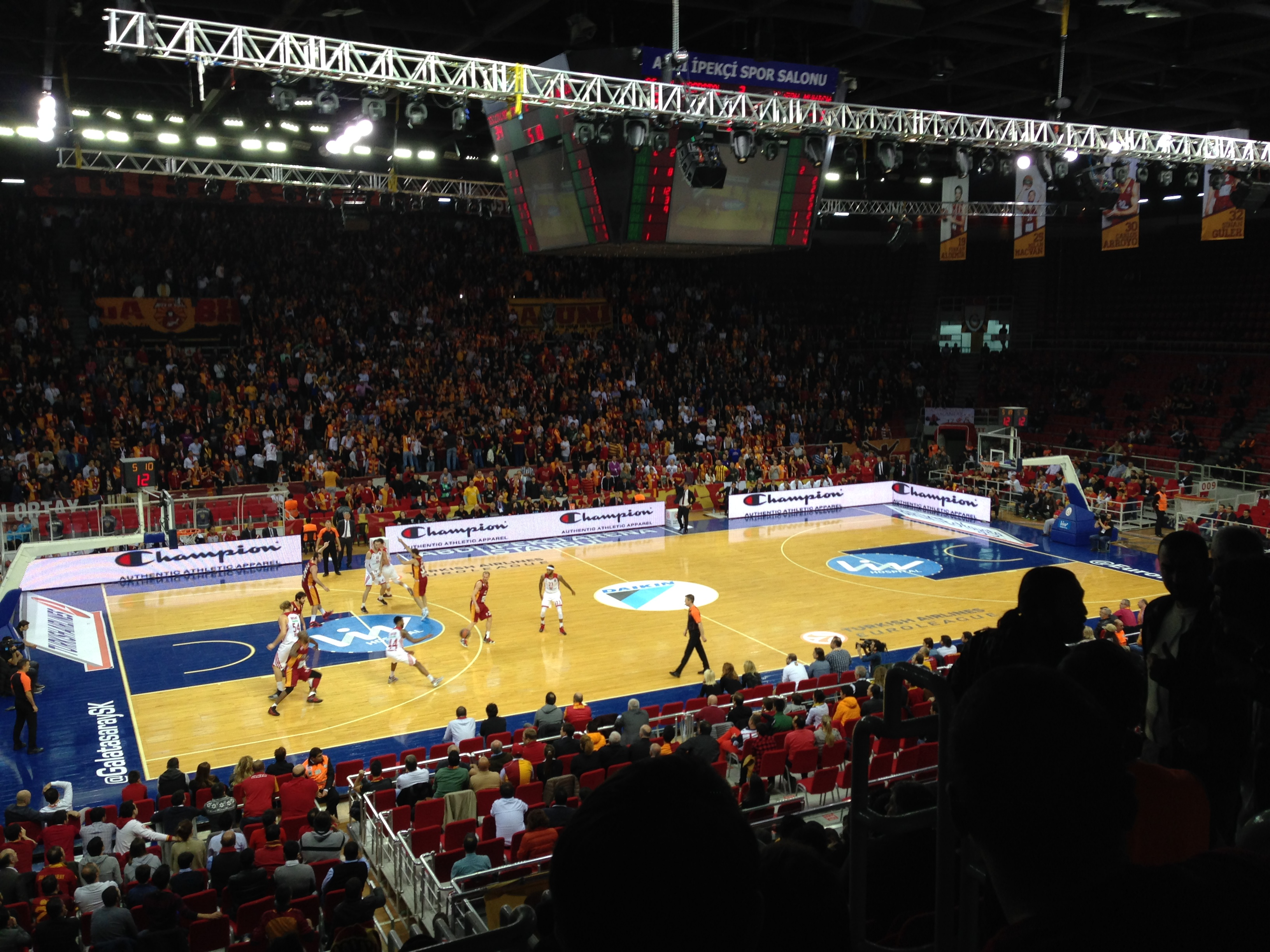
A Galatasaray home match in 2013 at the Abdi İpekçi Arena

#	Court	Capacity	Period
1	Abdi İpekçi Arena	12,270	2000–2005
2	Ahmet Cömert Sport Hall	3,500	2005–2006
3	Ayhan Şahenk Arena	3,500	2006–2009
4	Abdi İpekçi Arena	12,270	2009–2017
5	Sinan Erdem Dome	16,000	2017–2024
6	Basketbol Gelişim Merkezi	10,000	2024–2026
7	Sinan Erdem Dome	16,000	2026–present

== Administrative and Technical Staff ==
As of 16 October 2026

Staff member	Position
Özgün Önver	General Manager
İbrahim Tilki	Team Manager
Manuchar Markoishvili	Head Coach
Gökhan Turan	Assistant Coach
Ertan Bedir	Athletic Performance Coach

== Players ==
=== Current roster ===
Note: Flags indicate national team eligibility at FIBA-sanctioned events. Players may hold other non-FIBA nationalities not displayed.

Galatasaray roster
Players
Coaches

Pos.	No.	Nat.	Name	Ht.	Wt.	Age
SG	1	(United States)	Robinson, Jerome	1.93 m (6 ft 4 in)	86 kg (190 lb)	29 – 22 February 1997
G	2	(Turkey)	Hazer, Şehmus	1.91 m (6 ft 3 in)	90 kg (198 lb)	27 – 15 February 1999
PF	3	(Turkey)	Durmaz, Berkan	2.06 m (6 ft 9 in)	91 kg (201 lb)	29 – 20 February 1997
PG	4	(Turkey)	Tekin, Zekeriya Yiğit	1.88 m (6 ft 2 in)	75 kg (165 lb)	22 – 13 May 2004
PG	5	(Slovenia)	Nikolić, Aleksej	1.91 m (6 ft 3 in)	92 kg (203 lb)	31 – 21 February 1995
PG	8	(Turkey)	Korkmaz, Can	1.88 m (6 ft 2 in)	83 kg (183 lb)	34 – 21 October 1992
F/C	9	(Serbia)	Smailagić, Alen	2.08 m (6 ft 10 in)	98 kg (216 lb)	26 – 18 August 2000
PF/C	10	(Nigeria) (United States)	Metu, Chimezie (DC)	2.08 m (6 ft 10 in)	102 kg (225 lb)	29 – 22 March 1997
C	11	(Mali)	Ballo, Oumar	2.13 m (7 ft 0 in)	118 kg (260 lb)	24 – 13 July 2002
SF	12	(Belgium)	Bleijenbergh, Vrenz	2.11 m (6 ft 11 in)	95 kg (209 lb)	26 – 14 October 2000
PF	15	(Turkey)	Şekeroğlu, Efe	2.08 m (6 ft 10 in)	97 kg (214 lb)	22 – 13 April 2004
PG	18	(Montenegro)	Ivanović, Nikola (injured)	1.90 m (6 ft 3 in)	85 kg (187 lb)	32 – 19 February 1994
G	19	(Turkey)	Tuncer, Buğrahan (C)	1.93 m (6 ft 4 in)	90 kg (198 lb)	33 – 23 March 1993
F	21	(Canada)	Pierre, Dyshawn	1.98 m (6 ft 6 in)	104 kg (229 lb)	33 – 17 November 1993
PG	25	(United States)	Simpson, KJ	1.88 m (6 ft 2 in)	86 kg (190 lb)	24 – 8 August 2002

Head coach

- (Georgia (country)) Manuchar Markoishvili

Assistant coach(es)

- (Turkey) Gökhan Turan
- (Ukraine) Sergiy Gladyr
- (Turkey) Evren Karademir
- (Turkey) Arca Yıldırım

Athletic trainer(s)

- (Turkey) Ertan Bedir
- (Turkey) Yahya Keçeci

Physiotherapist(s)

- (Turkey) Aşkın Dede
- (Turkey) Ali Can Kaşlı

Team manager

- (Turkey) İbrahim Tilki

Legend

- (C) Team captain
- (DC) Dual citizenship
- Injured

- Roster
Updated: 25 October 2026

=== BCL Depth chart ===
Pos.	Starting 5	Bench 1	Bench 2	Bench 3
C	Oumar Ballo	Alen Smailagić	Efe Şekeroğlu
PF	Chimezie Metu	Berkan Durmaz
SF	Dyshawn Pierre	Jerome Robinson		Vrenz Bleijenbergh
SG	Şehmus Hazer	Buğrahan Tuncer		Aleksej Nikolić
PG	KJ Simpson	Nikola Ivanović	Can Korkmaz	Zekeriya Yiğit Tekin

=== BSL Depth chart ===
Pos.	Starting 5	Bench 1	Bench 2	Bench 3
C	Oumar Ballo*	Alen Smailagić*	Efe Şekeroğlu
PF	Chimezie Metu*	Berkan Durmaz
SF	Dyshawn Pierre*	Vrenz Bleijenbergh*		Jerome Robinson*
SG	Şehmus Hazer	Buğrahan Tuncer		Aleksej Nikolić*
PG	KJ Simpson*	Can Korkmaz	Nikola Ivanović*	Zekeriya Yiğit Tekin

- BSL requires a maximum of 7 registered foreign players per squad, with no more than 4 foreign players allowed on the court at any given time. Crucially, at least 1 Turkish player must remain on the floor during every second of game play. Foreign players are shown with an asterisk (*).

== Honours and other achievements ==
Honours
Type	Competition	Titles	Seasons
International	EuroCup	1	2015–16
Domestic	Turkish League	16	1947, 1948, 1949, 1950, 1953, 1955, 1956, 1960, 1963, 1964, 1966, 1968–69, 1984–85, 1985–86, 1989–90, 2012–13
Domestic	Turkish Cup	3	1969–70, 1971–72, 1994–95
Domestic	President's Cup	2	1985, 2011

=== Other Achievements ===
==== International competitions ====
- EuroLeague
  - Quarter Final (1): 2013-14
- EuroCup
  - Semi Final (1): 2007-08
- FIBA Champions League
  - Runners-up (1): 2024–25
  - Quarter Final (1): 2025–26

==== Domestic competitions ====
- Turkish League
  - Runners-up (10): 1946, 1951, 1952, 1961, 1984–85, 1985–86, 1986–87, 2010–11, 2013–14
- Turkish Cup
  - Runners-up (2): 1968–69, 2012–13

President's Cup

==== Other competitions ====
- Istanbul Basketball League (defunct)
  - Winners (15) (record): 1933–34, 1941–42, 1942–43, 1944–45, 1945–46, 1946–47, 1947–48, 1948–49, 1949–50, 1950–51, 1951–52, 1952–53, 1953–54, 1957–58, 1960–61

== Season by season ==
Season	Division	Pos.	Pos.	Turkish Cup	Presidential Cup	European competitions	
1966–67	TBL	2nd	—				
1967–68	TBL	3rd	—				
1968–69	TBL	Champion	—				
1969–70	TBL	6th	—				
1970–71	TBL	3rd	—				
1971–72	TBL	3rd	—				
1972–73	TBL	4th	—				
1973–74	TBL	3rd	—				
1974–75	TBL	2nd	—				
1975–76	TBL	7th	—				
1976–77	TBL	6th	—				
1977–78	TBL	7th	—				
1978–79	TBL	12th	—				
1979–80	TBL	10th	—				
1980–81	TBL	4th	7th				
1981–82	TBL	2nd	5th				
1982–83	TBL	5th	5th				
1983–84	TBL	5th	Quarterfinalist				
1984–85	TBL	2nd	Champion				
1985–86	TBL	3rd	Champion				
1986–87	TBL	8th	Runners-up				
1987–88	TBL	7th	Semifinalist				
1988–89	TBL	6th	6th				
1989–90	TBL	2nd	Champion				
1990–91	TBL	8th	—				
1991–92	TBL	8th	Quarterfinalist				
1992–93	TBL	6th	Quarterfinalist				
1993–94	TBL	5th	Quarterfinalist				
1994–95	TBL	7th	Quarterfinalist				
1995–96	TBL	5th	Quarterfinalist				
1996–97	TBL	9th	Quarterfinalist				
1997–98	TBL	8th	Quarterfinalist				
1998–99	TBL	6th	Quarterfinalist				
1999–00	TBL	7th	First Round				
2000–01	TBL	8th	Quarterfinalist				
2001–02	TBL	8th	First Round				
2002–03	TBL	3rd	Semifinalist	Semifinalist			
2003–04	TBL	12th	—	Semifinalist			
2004–05	TBL	13th	—	Group stage			
2005–06	TBL	8th	Quarterfinalist	Quarterfinalist			
2006–07	TBL	4th	Semifinalist	Quarterfinalist			
2007–08	TBL	5th	Quarterfinalist			2 ULEB Cup	4th
2008–09	TBL	4th	Semifinalist	Semifinalist		3 EuroChallenge	L16
2009–10	TBL	9th	—			2 Eurocup	L16
2010–11	TBL	3rd	Runners-up	Semifinalist		2 Eurocup	L16
2011–12	TBL	1st	Semifinalist	Third place		1 Euroleague	L16
2012–13	TBL	1st	Champion	Runners-up		2 Eurocup	L16
2013–14	TBL	4th	Runners-up	Semifinalist		1 Euroleague	QF
2014–15	TBL	8th	Quarterfinalist	Quarterfinalist	—	1 Euroleague	L16
2015–16	BSL	3rd	Semifinalist	Quarterfinalist	—	2 Eurocup	C
2016–17	BSL	6th	Quarterfinalist	Semifinalist	—	1 EuroLeague	12th
2017–18	BSL	9th	—	—	—	2 EuroCup	T16
2018–19	BSL	4th	Semifinalist	Quarterfinalist	—	2 EuroCup	RS
2019–20	BSL	CX	Cancelled	Semifinalist	Cancelled	2 EuroCup	CX
2020–21	BSL	14th	—	Cancelled	Cancelled	Champions League	RS
2021–22	BSL	3rd	Semifinalist	Semifinalist	—	Champions League	R16
2022–23	BSL	8th	Quarterfinalist	Cancelled	Cancelled	Champions League	R16
2023–24	BSL	5th	Quarterfinalist	Quarterfinalist	—	Champions League	R16
2024–25	BSL	7th	Quarterfinalist	Semifinalist	—	Champions League	RU
2025–26	BSL	7th	Quarterfinalist	—	—	Champions League	PO

== Team captains ==
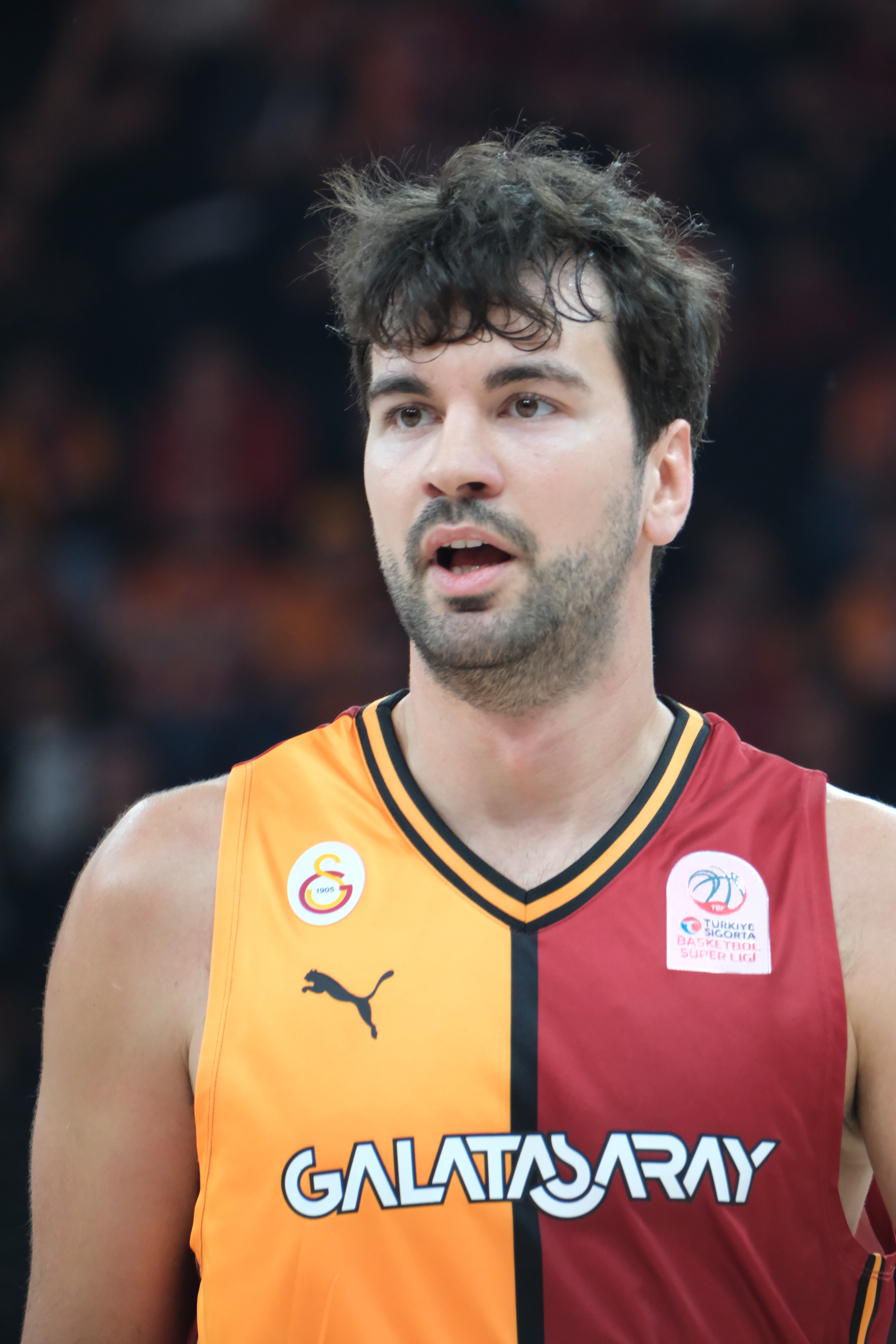
Buğrahan Tuncer, team captain from 2026 to present

Dates	Name
2010–2011	(Albania) (Turkey) Ermal Kuqo
2011–2012	(Turkey) Haluk Yıldırım
2012–2013	(Turkey) Ender Arslan
2013–2015	(Puerto Rico) Carlos Arroyo
2015–2017	(Turkey) Sinan Güler
2017–2025	(Turkey) Göksenin Köksal
2025–2026	(United States) Errick McCollum
2026–present	(Turkey) Buğrahan Tuncer

== Head coaches ==
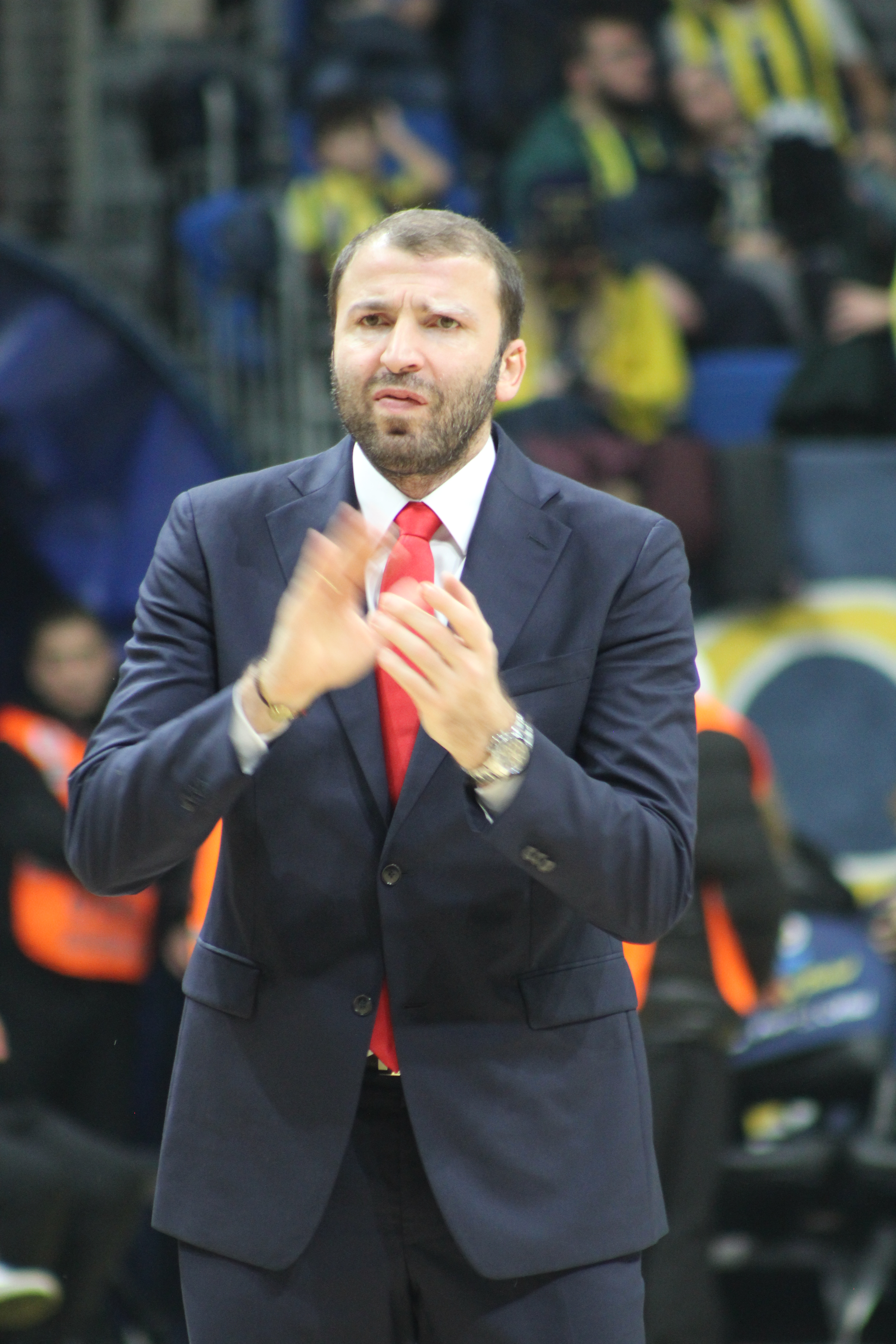
Manuchar Markoishvili

Head coach	Years
(Turkey) Samim Göreç	1945-51
(Turkey) Samim Göreç / (Turkey) Suat Kesim	1951-53
(Turkey) Yalçın Granit	1953-54
(Turkey) Sadi Gülçelik	1955
(Turkey) Ali Uras	1955-57
(United States) Jim McGregor	1957-58
(Turkey) Ali Uras	1958-61
(Turkey) Cavit Altunay	1961-62
(Turkey) Ali Uras	1962-63
(Turkey) Üner Erimer	1963
(Turkey) Ali Uras	1963-64
(Turkey) Yalçın Granit	1964
(Turkey) Tuğrul Demir	1964-65
(Turkey) Yalçın Granit	1965
(United States) Albert Cane	1965-66
(Turkey) Osman Kermen	1966-67
(Turkey) Yalçın Granit	1967–68
(Bulgaria) Petar Simenov	1968-70
(Turkey) Cavit Altunay	1970–73
(Turkey) Özer Salnur	1973-74
(United States) Jim Richardson	1974–75
(Turkey) Şengün Kaplanoğlu / (Turkey) İlker Esel	1975
(Turkey) Özer Salnur / (Turkey) İlker Esel	1976
(United States) John Robert Gidding	1976–77
(Turkey) Özer Salnur	1977–79
(Turkey) Koray Mincinozlu	1979–80
(Turkey) Fuat Tahir	1980–81
(Turkey) Koray Mincinozlu	1981–83
(Turkey) Mehmet Baturalp	1983–84
(Turkey) Yalçın Granit	1984
(Turkey) Halil Üner	1984
(Turkey) Nur Germen	1984–85
(Turkey) Fehmi Sadıkoğlu	1985–87
(Turkey) Özer Salnur	1987
(United States) Jack Avina	1987-1989
(Turkey) Faruk Akagün	1989–91
(Turkey) Hakan Yavuz	1991–92
(Turkey) Mehmet Baturalp	1992–93
(Turkey) Aydan Siyavuş	1993–96
(Turkey) Tolga Tuğsavul	1996
(Turkey) Aydan Siyavuş / (Turkey) Hakan Yavuz	1996–97
(Turkey) Tolga Tuğsavul	1997
(Turkey) Aydan Siyavuş	1998
(Turkey) Koray Mincinozlu	1998–99
(Turkey) Fehmi Sadıkoğlu	1999–2000
(Turkey) Koray Mincinozlu	2000–2002
(Turkey) Erman Kunter	2002–2003
(Turkey) Halil Üner	2003–2006
(Turkey) Murat Özyer	2006–2008
(Turkey) Koray Mincinozlu	2009
(Turkey) Okan Çevik	2009
(Turkey) Cem Akdağ	2009–2010
(Turkey) Oktay Mahmuti	2010–2012
(Turkey) Ergin Ataman	2012–2017
(Turkey) Erman Kunter	2017–2018
(Turkey) Oktay Mahmuti	2018
(Turkey) Ertuğrul Erdoğan	2018–2020
(Turkey) Ömer Uğurata	2020–2021
(Turkey) Ekrem Memnun	2021–2022
(Greece) Andreas Pistiolis	2022–2023
(Montenegro) Zvezdan Mitrović	2023–2024
(Turkey) Yakup Sekizkök	2024–2025
(Turkey) Gökhan Turan	2026
(Italy) Gianmarco Pozzecco	2026
(Georgia (country)) Manuchar Markoishvili	2026–present

== Notable players ==
Note: Flags indicate national team eligibility at FIBA-sanctioned events. Players may hold other non-FIBA nationalities not displayed.

Criteria

To appear in this section a player must have either:

- Set a club record or won an individual award while at the club
- Played at least one official international match for their national team at any time
- Played at least one official NBA match at any time.

- (Turkey) (Bosnia and Herzegovina) Asım Pars
- (Turkey) Cüneyt Erden
- (Turkey) Cevher Özer
- (Turkey) Cenk Akyol
- (Turkey) Ender Arslan
- (Turkey) Engin Atsür
- (Turkey) Furkan Aldemir
- (Turkey) Göksenin Köksal
- (Turkey) Haluk Yıldırım
- (Turkey) Hüseyin Beşok
- (Turkey) Kerem Tunçeri
- (Turkey) Kerem Gönlüm
- (Turkey) Levent Topsakal
- (Turkey) Nedim Dal
- (Turkey) Orhun Ene
- (Turkey) Ömer Büyükaycan
- (Turkey) Özhan Canaydın
- (Turkey) Sinan Güler
- (Turkey) Serhat Çetin
- (Turkey) Sultan Kösen
- (Turkey) Tolga Tekinalp
- (Turkey) Tamer Oyguç
- (Turkey) Yalçın Granit
- (United States) (Israel) T. J. Cline
- (United States) (Israel) Alex Tyus
- (United States) (Bulgaria) Dee Bost
- (United States) Dee Brown
- (United States) Rakeem Christmas
- (United States) Lloyd Daniels
- (United States) Austin Daye
- (United States) Dell Demps
- (United States) Justin Dentmon
- (United States) Joey Dorsey
- (United States) (Turkey) Erwin Dudley
- (United States) Gerald Fitch
- (United States) Corey Gaines
- (United States) Freddie Gillespie
- (United States) Jamon Gordon
- (United States) Jamont Gordon
- (United States) Antonio Graves
- (United States) Malik Hairston
- (United States) Aaron Harrison
- (United States) David Hawkins
- (United States) Richard Hendrix
- (United States) Scotty Hopson
- (United States) Frankie King
- (United States) Daryl Macon
- (United States) Marlon Maxey
- (United States) Errick McCollum
- (United States) Ben Moore
- (United States) Chris Owens
- (United States) (Czech Republic) Blake Schilb
- (United States) (Ivory Coast) Deon Thompson
- (United States) (North Macedonia) Darius Washington, Jr.
- (United States) Darius Washington Jr.
- (United States) DaJuan Summers
- (United States) (Bosnia and Herzegovina) Henry Domercant
- (United States) John Roberson
- (United States) (Turkey) Paul Dawkins
- (United States) Russ Smith
- (Greece) (United States) Zach Auguste
- (United States) (Ivory Coast) Alex Poythress
- (United States) (Bosnia and Herzegovina) Alex Renfroe
- (United States) Josh Shipp
- (United States) Anthony Tolliver
- (United States) Henry Walker
- (United States) Jaquay Walls
- (United States) Greg Whittington
- (Lithuania) Adas Juškevičius
- (Lithuania) Darius Songaila
- (Lithuania) Martynas Pocius
- (Lithuania) Simas Jasaitis
- (Senegal) Maurice Ndour
- (Serbia) Boris Savović
- (Serbia) Dejan Milojević
- (Serbia) Milan Gurović
- (Serbia) Milan Mačvan
- (Serbia) Vladimir Micov
- (Serbia) Zoran Erceg
- (Slovakia) Radoslav Rančík
- (Slovakia) Richard Petruška
- (Croatia) Andrija Žižić
- (Croatia) Lukša Andrić
- (North Macedonia) Mike Wilkinson
- (North Macedonia) (Turkey) Kristijan Nikolov
- (Albania) (Turkey) Ermal Kuqo
- (Bosnia and Herzegovina) Nihad Đedović
- (Colombia) Braian Angola
- (Georgia (country)) Manuchar Markoishvili
- (Latvia) Gundars Vētra
- (Lebanon) (United States) Joe Vogel
- (Slovenia) Jaka Lakovič
- (United Kingdom) Pops Mensah-Bonsu
- (Australia) Nathan Jawai
- (Canada) Denham Brown
- (Nigeria) Julius Nwosu
- (Georgia (country)) (Turkey) Zaza Pachulia
- (Panama) Kevin Daley
- (Senegal) Boniface N'Dong

== See also ==
- See also Galatasaray S.K. (women's basketball)
- See also Galatasaray S.K. (wheelchair basketball)
