= Ali Uras =

Turkish basketball player

27th President of Galatasaray SK
- In office 27 January 1979 – 15 March 1986
- Preceded by: Selahattin Beyazıt
- Succeeded by: Ali Tanrıyar

Personal details
- Born: 14 May 1923 Sinop, Turkey
- Died: 5 May 2012 (aged 88) Istanbul, Turkey
- Education: Kabataş Erkek Lisesi
- Alma mater: Istanbul University

Ali Uras (8 June 1923 – 5 May 2012) was a Turkish basketball player. He competed at the 1952 Summer Olympics. He was also the president of Galatasaray S.K.
