= 2013–14 Fenerbahçe S.K. (basketball) season =

Fenerbahçe Ülker
2013–14 season
- Chairman: Aziz Yıldırım
- Head coach: Željko Obradović
- Arena: Ülker Sports Arena
- Turkish Basketball League: 2nd seed
- Playoffs: Winners
- Euroleague: Top 16
- Turkish Cup: Semifinals
- Presidential Cup: Winners

The 2013–14 season was Fenerbahçe's 100th season in the existence of the club. The team played in the Turkish Basketball League and in the Euroleague.

== Players ==
=== Squad information ===
Fenerbahçe Ülker roster
Players
Coaches

Pos.	No.	Nat.	Name	Ht.	Wt.	Age
PG	4	(North Macedonia) (United States)	McCalebb, Bo (DC)	1.83 m (6 ft 0 in)	82 kg (181 lb)	29 – 4 May 1985
SG	7	(Turkey)	Onan, Ömer (C)	1.94 m (6 ft 4 in)	95 kg (209 lb)	36 – 4 February 1978
PF	8	(Serbia)	Bjelica, Nemanja	2.09 m (6 ft 10 in)	106 kg (234 lb)	26 – 9 May 1988
SG	10	(Turkey)	Mahmutoğlu, Melih	1.91 m (6 ft 3 in)	85 kg (187 lb)	24 – 12 May 1990
F	11	(Lithuania)	Kleiza, Linas	2.03 m (6 ft 8 in)	106 kg (234 lb)	29 – 3 January 1985
F	12	(Turkey)	Türkyılmaz, İzzet	2.16 m (7 ft 1 in)	96 kg (212 lb)	24 – 20 May 1990
C	13	(Slovenia)	Vidmar, Gašper	2.10 m (6 ft 11 in)	114 kg (251 lb)	26 – 14 September 1987
PF	17	(Turkey)	Olmaz, Ayberk	2.07 m (6 ft 9 in)	85 kg (187 lb)	18 – 8 June 1996
F/C	18	(Montenegro)	Sekulić, Blagota	2.10 m (6 ft 11 in)	116 kg (256 lb)	32 – 14 March 1982
C	21	(Turkey)	Savaş, Oğuz	2.13 m (7 ft 0 in)	132 kg (291 lb)	26 – 13 July 1987
C	22	(Croatia)	Žorić, Luka	2.10 m (6 ft 11 in)	110 kg (243 lb)	29 – 5 November 1984
G	23	(Turkey)	Uğurlu, Berk	1.92 m (6 ft 4 in)	72 kg (159 lb)	18 – 27 April 1996
PG	25	(Turkey) (Kosovo)	Sipahi, Kenan (DC)	1.97 m (6 ft 6 in)	85 kg (187 lb)	19 – 26 May 1995
SF	33	(Turkey) (Republic of Ireland)	Birsen, Metecan (DC)	2.06 m (6 ft 9 in)	100 kg (220 lb)	19 – 6 April 1995
PF	41	(Turkey)	Karaman, İlkan	2.06 m (6 ft 9 in)	115 kg (254 lb)	24 – 13 May 1990
SF	44	(Croatia)	Bogdanović, Bojan	2.03 m (6 ft 8 in)	98 kg (216 lb)	25 – 18 April 1989
G/F	55	(Turkey) (Bosnia and Herzegovina)	Preldžić, Emir (DC)	2.06 m (6 ft 9 in)	91 kg (201 lb)	26 – 6 September 1987

Head coach

- (Serbia) Željko Obradović

Assistant coach(es)

- (Spain) Josep Maria Izquierdo
- (Serbia) Vladimir Androić
- (Turkey) Ertuğrul Erdoğan
- (Turkey) Erdem Can

Team manager

- (Turkey) Mirsad Türkcan

Legend

- (C) Team captain
- Injured

- Roster

=== Transactions ===
==== In ====
No.	Pos.	Nat.	Name	Age	Moving from		Ends	Date	Source
8	PF	(Serbia)	Nemanja Bjelica	25	Baskonia	(Spain)	June 2016	29 July 2013	
22	C	(Croatia)	Luka Žorić	28	Unicaja Málaga	(Spain)	June 2016	29 July 2013	
11	F	(Lithuania)	Linas Kleiza	28	Toronto Raptors	(Canada)	June 2015	29 July 2013	
25	PG	(Turkey)	Kenan Sipahi	18	Tofaş	(Turkey)	June 2016	2 September 2013	
12	PF	(Turkey)	İzzet Türkyılmaz	23	Banvit	(Turkey)	June 2016	2 September 2013	
10	SG	(Turkey)	Erdemirspor	23	Tofaş	(Turkey)	June 2015	2 September 2013	

==== Out ====
No.	Pos.	Nat.	Name	Age	Moving to		Date	Source
13	C	(Australia)	David Andersen	32	Free agent		12 June 2013	
14	C	(Turkey)	Kaya Peker	33	Trabzonspor	(Turkey)	4 August 2013	
24	PF	(United States)	Mike Batiste	35	Panathinaikos	(Greece)	7 August 2013	
	G	(Turkey)	Can Maxim Mutaf	22	Trabzonspor	(Turkey)	31 August 2013	
10	SF	(Central African Republic)	Romain Sato	32	Valencia	(Spain)	31 August 2013	
11	SG	(Serbia)	Uroš Tripković	27	Vanoli Cremona	(Italy)	30 October 2013	

== Overview ==
Competition	First match	Last match	Starting round	Final position	Record							
Competition	First match	Last match	Starting round	Final position	Pld	W	D	L	PF	PA	PD	Win %
Turkish Basketball League	12 October 2013	19 June 2014	Round 1	Winners	42	33	0	9	3,411	2,896	+515	78.57
Euroleague	17 October 2013	10 April 2014	Round 1	Top 16	24	14	0	10	1,927	1,850	+77	58.33
Turkish Cup	1 October 2013	7 February 2014	Group stage	Semifinals	5	4	0	1	404	347	+57	80.00
Presidential Cup	9 October 2013		Final	Winners	1	1	0	0	64	62	+2	100.00
Total					72	52	0	20	5,806	5,155	+651	72.22

Source: Competitions

=== Presidential Cup ===
9 October 2013	Galatasaray Liv Hospital	62–64	Fenerbahçe Ülker	Samsun
19:00 EEST (UTC+3)	Scoring by quarter: 19–16, 16–17, 11–11, 16–20
	Pts: Gordon 16; Rebs: Dağlı 10; Asts: Arroyo 4 PIR: Gordon 19	Boxscore	Pts: Preldžič 14; Rebs: Vidmar 10; Asts: Preldžič, Bogdanović 3 PIR: Preldžič 16	Arena: Yaşar Doğu Sports Hall; Referees: Fatih Söylemezoğlu, Emin Moğulkoç, Kaan Büyükçil

=== Turkish Basketball League ===
==== League table ====
Pos	Team	Pld	W	L	PF	PA	PD	Pts	Qualification or relegation
1	Banvit	30	28	2	2472	2100	+372	58	Qualification to playoffs
2	Fenerbahçe Ülker	30	24	6	2476	2096	+380	54	Qualification to playoffs
3	Anadolu Efes	30	22	8	2296	2132	+164	52	Qualification to playoffs
4	Galatasaray Liv Hospital	30	20	10	2372	2195	+177	50	Qualification to playoffs
5	Beşiktaş İntegral Forex	30	19	11	2359	2192	+167	49	Qualification to playoffs
6	Pınar Karşıyaka	30	17	13	2397	2282	+115	47	Qualification to playoffs
7	Uşak Sportif	30	16	14	2312	2335	−23	46	Qualification to playoffs
8	Tofaş	30	16	14	2423	2386	+37	46	Qualification to playoffs
9	Trabzonspor Medical Park	30	13	17	2415	2369	+46	43	
10	Royal Halı Gaziantep	30	13	17	2268	2216	+52	43	
11	Türk Telekom	30	12	18	2247	2292	−45	42	
12	Aykon TED Kolejliler	30	12	18	2294	2392	−98	42	
13	Torku Selçuk Üniversitesi	30	10	20	2276	2481	−205	40	
14	Olin Edirne	30	8	22	2350	2768	−418	38	
15	Mersin BB (R)	30	7	23	2252	2496	−244	37	Relegation to TBL
16	Aliağa Petkim (R)	30	3	27	2107	2584	−477	33	Relegation to TBL

Source: TBL
(R) Relegated

==== Results summary ====
Overall						Home					Away				
Pld	W	L	PF	PA	PD	W	L	PF	PA	PD	W	L	PF	PA	PD
30	24	6	2476	2096	+380	13	2	1270	1012	+258	11	4	1206	1084	+122

Source: TBF.org.tr

=== Euroleague ===
==== Group A regular season ====
===== Standing =====
Pos	Team	Pld	W	L	PF	PA	PD	Tie
1	(Turkey) Fenerbahçe Ülker	10	8	2	849	749	+100	
2	(Russia) CSKA Moscow	10	7	3	732	676	+56	1–1 (+5)
3	(Spain) FC Barcelona	10	7	3	786	729	+57	1–1 (–5)
4	(Serbia) Partizan	10	3	7	668	715	−47	1–1 (+29)
5	(France) Nanterre	10	3	7	682	753	−71	1–1 (–29)
6	(Ukraine) Budivelnyk	10	2	8	737	832	−95	

===== Fixtures/results =====
All times given below are in Central European Time.

17 October 2013
18:00

Boxscore

Budivelnyk (Ukraine)	84–102	(Turkey) Fenerbahçe Ülker
Scoring by quarter: 15–18, 28–23, 34–30, 7–31
Pts: Lavrinovič 21; Rebs: Lavrinovič, Minard 4 Asts: Minard, Strēlnieks 5		Pts: Bogdanović 21; Rebs: Bjelica, Vidmar 6 Asts: Preldžič 7

Palace of Sports, Kyiv
Attendance: 4,200
Referees: Sreten Radovic (CRO), Carmelo Paternico (ITA), Apostolos Kalpakas (GRE)

25 October 2013
19:00

Boxscore

Fenerbahçe Ülker (Turkey)	75–70	(Spain) FC Barcelona
Scoring by quarter: 24–17, 20–18, 22–17, 9–18
Pts: Kleiza 22; Rebs: McCalebb 8 Asts: McCalebb, Preldžič 4		Pts: Navarro 18; Rebs: Tomić 9 Asts: Huertas, Tomić 4

Ülker Sports Arena, Istanbul
Attendance: 12,800
Referees: Luigi Lamonica (ITA), Eddie Viator (FRA), Tomasz Trawicki (POL)

31 October 2013
20:45

Boxscore

Fenerbahçe Ülker (Turkey)	86–60	(Russia) CSKA Moscow
Scoring by quarter: 26–16, 18–17, 17–14, 25–13
Pts: Bogdanović 23; Rebs: Bjelica 9 Asts: McCalebb, Preldžič 5		Pts: Micov 20; Rebs: Hines 8 Asts: Teodosić 6

Ülker Sports Arena, Istanbul
Attendance: 12,800
Referees: Dani Hierrezuelo (ESP), Matej Boltauzer (SLO), Panagiotis Anastopoulos (GRE)

8 November 2013
20:45

Boxscore

Partizan NIS (Serbia)	78–88	(Turkey) Fenerbahçe Ülker
Scoring by quarter: 17-13, 21-17, 19-30, 21-28
Pts: Lauvergne 20; Rebs: Lauvergne 10; Asts: Milosavljević 3		Pts: Bogdanović 26; Rebs: Preldžič 6 Asts: Preldžič 8

Pionir Hall, Belgrade
Attendance: 8,000
Referees: Miguel Perez Perez (ESP), Sergiy Zashchuk (UKR), Ioannis Foufis (GRE)

14 November 2013
19:15

Boxscore

Fenerbahçe Ülker (Turkey)	83–66	(France) JSF Nanterre
Scoring by quarter: 23-19, 21-13, 14-18, 25-16
Pts: Bogdanović 20; Rebs: Vidmar 9 Asts: McCalebb, Preldžič 4		Pts: Traore 20; Rebs: Daniels 5 Asts: Foster 4

Ülker Sports Arena, Istanbul
Attendance: 12,237
Referees: Guerrino Cerebuch (ITA), Sergiy Chebyshev (UKR), Carlos Cortes (ESP)

22 November 2013
19:00

Boxscore

Fenerbahçe Ülker (Turkey)	84–68	(Ukraine) Budivelnyk
Scoring by quarter: 27-23, 25-12, 16-16, 16-17
Pts: Bogdanović 20; Rebs: Vidmar 10; Asts: Bjelica 6		Pts: Šalenga 16; Rebs: Tischenko, Summers 4 Asts: Ahearn, Šalenga, Minard 4

Ülker Sports Arena, Istanbul
Attendance: 12,123
Referees: Juan Carlos Arteaga (ESP), Marek Cmikiewicz (POL), Haris Bijedić (BIH)

29 November 2013
21:00

Boxscore

FC Barcelona (Spain)	94–81	(Turkey) Fenerbahçe Ülker
Scoring by quarter: 35-15, 17-25, 22-22, 20-19
Pts: Nachbar 23; Rebs: Nachbar 9 Asts: Tomić 5		Pts: McCalebb 22; Rebs: Bjelica 11; Asts: Bogdanović 5

Palau Blaugrana, Barcelona
Attendance: 5,494
Referees: Spiros Gkontas (GRE), Matej Boltauzer (SLO), Boris Shulga (UKR)

6 December 2013
17:00

Boxscore

CSKA Moscow (Russia)	74–78	(Turkey) Fenerbahçe Ülker
Scoring by quarter: 17–19, 18–22, 24–15, 15–22
Pts: Weems 20; Rebs: Vorontsevich 9 Asts: Teodosić 4		Pts: Bogdanović 18; Rebs: Preldžič 6 Asts: Preldžič 8

CSKA Universal Sports Hall, Moscow
Attendance: 4,914
Referees: Christos Christodoulou (GRE), Olegs Latisevs (LAT), Oscar Perea (ESP)

12 December 2013
20:45

Boxscore

Fenerbahçe Ülker (Turkey)	77–79	(Serbia) Partizan NIS
Scoring by quarter: 17-30, 20-9, 23-20, 17-20
Pts: Preldžič 21; Rebs: Preldžič 6 Asts: Preldžič 7		Pts: Kinsey 20; Rebs: Lauvergne, Milosavljević 5 Asts: Bogdanović, Milosavljević 5

Ülker Sports Arena, Istanbul
Attendance: 11,917
Referees: Jose Martin (ESP), Juan Carlos Arteaga (ESP), Petros Papapetrou (GRE)

19–20 December 2013
21:00

Boxscore

JSF Nanterre (France)	76–95	(Turkey) Fenerbahçe Ülker
Scoring by quarter: 21-27, 20-24, 18-22, 17-22
Pts: Thomas 14; Rebs: Lighty 4 Asts: Lighty 5		Pts: Bogdanović 20; Rebs: Bjelica, Žorić 5 Asts: Preldžič 5

Halle Georges Carpentier, Paris
Attendance: 4,500
Referees: Jose Ramon Garcia Ortiz (ESP), Jakub Zamojski (POL), Panagiotis Anastopoulos (GRE)

==== Group E Top 16 ====
===== Standing =====
Top 16 began in January 2012 and will conclude in March 2012.

Pos	Team	Pld	W	L	PF	PA	PD
1	(Spain) FC Barcelona	14	12	2	1109	1009	+100
2	(Italy) EA7 Milano	14	10	4	1093	1011	+82
3	(Greece) Olympiacos	14	8	6	1058	996	+62
4	(Greece) Panathinaikos	14	7	7	961	958	+3
5	(Spain) Unicaja	14	6	8	1032	1063	−31
6	(Turkey) Fenerbahçe Ülker	14	6	8	1078	1101	−23
7	(Spain) Laboral Kutxa	14	5	9	1061	1125	−64
8	(Turkey) Anadolu Efes	14	2	12	967	1096	−129

	Team	Pld	W	L	PF	PA	Diff
1.	(Spain) Unicaja	2	1	1	156	144	+12
2.	(Turkey) Fenerbahçe Ülker	2	1	1	144	156	–12

===== Fixtures/results =====
All times given below are in Central European Time.

3 January 2014
20:30

Boxscore

Olympiacos (Greece)	95–82	(Turkey) Fenerbahçe Ülker
Scoring by quarter: 27–19, 20–21, 15–16, 33–26
Pts: Spanoulis 28; Rebs: Perperoglou, Spanoulis 5 Asts: Spanoulis 9		Pts: Preldžič 17; Rebs: Bjelica, Preldžič 6 Asts: Preldžič 5

Peace and Friendship Stadium, Piraeus
Attendance: 11,244
Referees: Danie Hierrezuelo (ESP), Fernando Rocha (POR), Carmelo Paternico (ITA)

9 January 2014
19:00

Boxscore

Fenerbahçe Ülker (Turkey)	73–76	(Spain) FC Barcelona
Scoring by quarter: 18–23, 21–16, 17–19, 17–18
Pts: Bjelica, Mahmutoğlu 15; Rebs: Bjelica 7 Asts: Kleiza 3		Pts: Huertas 23; Rebs: Papanikolaou 7 Asts: Huertas 7

Ülker Sports Arena, Istanbul
Attendance: 12,968
Referees: Luigi Lamonica (ITA), Eddie Viator (FRA), Olegs Latisevs (LAT)

17 January 2014
19:00

Boxscore

Unicaja Málaga (Spain)	89–75	(Turkey) Fenerbahçe Ülker
Scoring by quarter: 19–19, 18–20, 25–27, 27–9
Pts: Dragić 24; Rebs: Štimac 8 Asts: Calloway 6		Pts: Mahmutoğlu 19; Rebs: Vidmar 7 Asts: McCalebb 8

Palacio de Deportes, Málaga
Attendance: 5,700
Referees: Christos Christodoulou (GRE), Boris Shulga (UKR), Joseph Bisssang (FRA)

23 January 2014
19:00

Boxscore

Fenerbahçe Ülker (Turkey)	77–72	(Greece) Panathinaikos
Scoring by quarter: 23–11, 16–17, 17–22, 21–22
Pts: Bogdanović 15; Rebs: McCalebb 7 Asts: Bogdanović 3		Pts: Curry 14; Rebs: Gist 10; Asts: Diamantidis 8

Ülker Sports Arena, Istanbul
Attendance: 12,526
Referees: Sreten Radovic (CRO), Emilio Perez Pizarro (ESP), Roberto Chiari (ITA)

30 January 2014
20:30

Boxscore

Emporio Armani Milano (Italy)	90–85	(Turkey) Fenerbahçe Ülker
Scoring by quarter: 18–25, 31–15, 15–18, 26–27
Pts: Hackett 17; Rebs: Hackett 7 Asts: Langford 5		Pts: Kleiza 26; Rebs: Preldžič 6 Asts: Preldžič 4

Mediolanum Forum, Milan
Attendance: 10,290
Referees: Boris Ryzhyk (UKR), Juan Carlos Garcia Gonzalez (ESP), Damir Javor (SLO)

13 February 2014
20:45

Boxscore

Fenerbahçe Ülker (Turkey)	98–64	(Spain) Laboral Kutxa
Scoring by quarter: 30-24, 29-14, 23-17, 16-9
Pts: Bogdanović 17; Rebs: Bjelica 9 Asts: Preldžič 7		Pts: Pleiss 14; Rebs: Hanga 5 Asts: Hodge 5

Ülker Sports Arena, Istanbul
Attendance: 8,670
Referees: Lottermoser, Robert (GER), Zamojski, Jakub (POL), Anastopoulos, Panagiotis (GRE)

21 February 2014
19:15

Boxscore

Anadolu Efes (Turkey)	63–71	(Turkey) Fenerbahçe Ülker
Scoring by quarter: 24-24, 15-17, 14-13, 10-17
Pts: Savanović 15; Rebs: Gönlüm, M.Bjelica 4 Asts: Gordon 8		Pts: Bogdanović 17; Rebs: Preldžič 7 Asts: Preldžič 6

Abdi İpekçi Arena, Istanbul
Attendance: 8,078
Referees: Guerrino Cerebuch (ITA), Jose Ramon Garcia Ortiz (ESP), Boris Shulga (UKR)

28 February 2014
19:00

Boxscore

Fenerbahce Ulker (Turkey)	78–74	(Greece) Olympiacos
Scoring by quarter: 21-22, 20-16, 18-13, 19-23
Pts: Kleiza 21; Rebs: Bjelica, Kleiza 8 Asts: Preldžič, Bogdanović, McCalebb 3		Pts: Perperoglou, Sloukas 17; Rebs: Dunston 7 Asts: Sloukas 4

Ulker Sports Arena, Istanbul
Attendance: 12,917
Referees: Jose Martin (ESP), Antonio Conde (ESP), Marek Cmikiewicz (POL)

6 March 2014
20:45

Boxscore

FC Barcelona (Spain)	93–73	(Turkey) Fenerbahce Ulker
Scoring by quarter: 18–19, 27–19, 19–10, 29–25
Pts: Tomić 19; Rebs: Dorsey 6 Asts: Navarro 5		Pts: Bjelica 15; Rebs: Bjelica 10; Asts: Preldžič 4

Palau Blaugrana, Barcelona
Attendance: 5,858
Referees: Fernando Rocha (POR), Spiros Gkontas (GRE), Matej Boltauzer (SLO)

13 March 2014
19:00

Fenerbahçe Ülker (Turkey)	vs.	(Spain) Unicaja Málaga

Ülker Sports Arena, Istanbul

20 March 2014
20:45

Panathinaikos (Greece)	vs.	(Turkey) Fenerbahçe Ülker

Olympic Indoor Hall, Athens

28 March 2014
19:30

Fenerbahçe Ülker (Turkey)	vs.	(Italy) Emporio Armani Milano

Ülker Sports Arena, Istanbul

20 March 2014
20:45

Laboral Kutxa (Spain)	vs.	(Turkey) Fenerbahçe Ülker

Fernando Buesa Arena, Vitoria-Gasteiz

April 2014

Fenerbahçe Ülker (Turkey)	vs.	(Turkey) Anadolu Efes

Ülker Sports Arena, Istanbul

=== Turkish Basketball Cup ===
==== Group C ====
===== Standing =====
Pos	Team	Pld	W	L	PF	PA	PD	Pts	Qualification
1	Fenerbahçe Ülker	3	3	0	259	199	+60	6	Advance to Quarterfinals
2	Tofaş	3	2	1	257	247	+10	5	Advance to Quarterfinals
3	Olin Edirne	3	1	2	213	254	−41	4	
4	Torku Konya Selçuk Üniversitesi	3	0	3	223	252	−29	3	

Source: Turkish Basketball Federation

==== Quarterfinal ====
5 February 2014
20:30

Boxscore

Fenerbahçe Ülker	72–66	Trabzonspor Medical Park
Scoring by quarter: 22 - 14, 28 - 15, 9 - 24, 13 - 13
Pts: Kleiza 21; Rebs: Preldžić 11; Asts: Preldžić 6		Pts: Penney 21; Rebs: Stipanović, Külçebaş 5 Asts: Randle 7

Ankara Arena, Ankara
Referees: Murat Biricik, Ahmet Ersan Ergüler, Ziya Özorhon

==== Semifinal ====
7 February 2014
18:00

Boxscore

Pınar Karşıyaka	82–73	Fenerbahçe Ülker
Scoring by quarter: 21 - 13, 19 - 17, 19 - 14, 23 - 29
Pts: Williams 16; Rebs: Batista 6 Asts: Dixon 9		Pts: Preldžić 15; Rebs: McCalebb 8 Asts: Preldžić, McCalebb 5

Ankara Arena, Ankara
Referees: Mehmet Keseratar, Emin Moğulkoç, Halil Baldemir
