= Derya Yannier =

Turkish basketball player (born 1985)

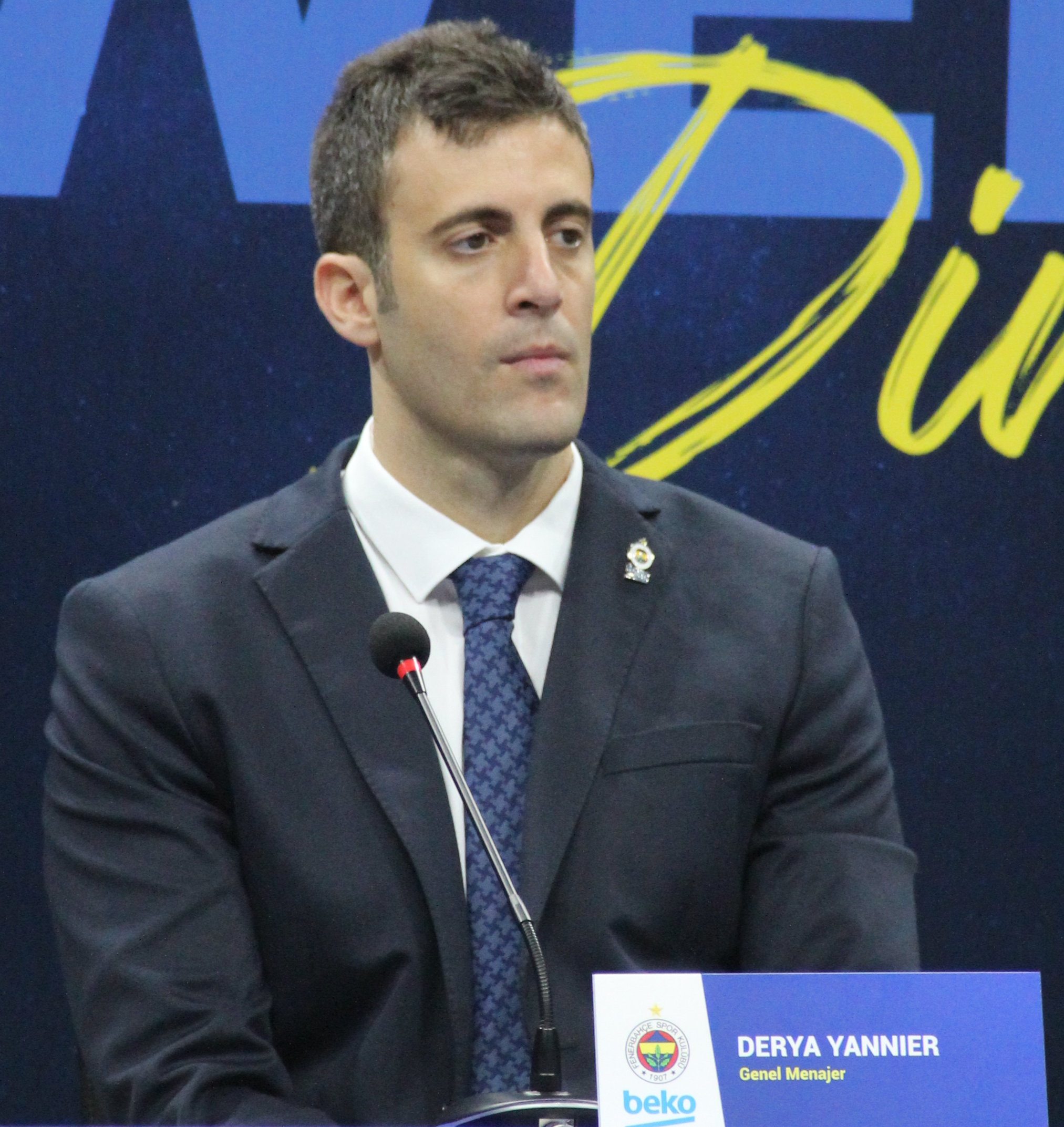

Fenerbahçe
- Title: General manager
- League: BSL; EuroLeague

Personal information
- Born: February 28, 1985 (age 41) Istanbul, Turkey
- Listed height: 6 ft 3 in (1.91 m)

Career information
- NBA draft: 2007: undrafted
- Playing career: 2005–2012
- Position: Shooting guard
- Coaching career: 2014–present

Career history

Playing
- 2005–2006: Ülker
- 2006–2007: Beşiktaş
- 2007–2008: Bandırma
- 2009–2010: Olin Edirne
- 2010–2012: Hacettepe Üniversitesi

Coaching
- 2014–2018: Olin Edirne (General Manager)
- 2018–2021: Turkish Basketball Federation (Director of Men's Leagues)
- 2021–2022: Fenerbahçe (Assistant General Manager)
- 2022–: Fenerbahçe (General Manager)

Derya Yannier (born 28 February 1985) is a Turkish Jewish former professional basketball player, his father, Habib Yannier, was also a professional player who represented the Turkey men's national basketball team in the Olympics.

== Career ==
After graduating from Robert College in Istanbul, he joined the Ülkerspor youth academy; after developing there, he won both the Turkish Basketball Super League championship and the Presidential Cup with Ülkerspor during the 2005–06 season.

A graduate of the Koç University Department of Economics, Yannier played for Beşiktaş Cola Turka (2006–07), Bandırma Banvit (2007–09), Olin Edirne (2009–10), Hacettepe Üniversitesi (2010–2012).

== Managing Career ==
After ending his playing career at age 28 due to a knee injury, he began working as the general manager of Eskişehir Basket in 2014. Following a one-year hiatus, he returned to Eskişehir Basket as general manager in 2016. At the end of the 2016–2017 season, Yannier won the TBL Federation Cup with Eskişehir Basket and led the team to promotion to the Turkish Basketball Super League. Under the general management of Yannier, Eskişehir Basket achieved a quarter-final berth in the Turkish Basketball Super League playoffs.

He served as the Director of Men's Leagues at the Turkish Basketball Federation between 2018 and 2021, also spearheaded numerous significant initiatives under the auspices, most notably the "Club Financial Audit and Licensing Regulation" project.

On 13 August 2021, Yannier assumed the role of Assistant General Manager for Fenerbahçe. On 18 June 2022, he appointed General Manager after Maurizio Gherardini moved to the role of General Director of Basketball Operations at the club.

In 2025, while serving as an executive at Fenerbahçe became the EuroLeague champion that year and named the "EuroLeague's Executive of the Year".

== Personal life ==
Yannier is descended from a family of Sephardic Jews.

== Honours and awards ==
=== Club honours ===
- Ulkerspor (2005–2006)
  - Turkish Super League: (2005–06)
  - Presidential Cup: (2005)

=== Managing honours ===
- Eskişehir Basket (2014–2018)
  - Promoted to Turkish Super League: 2016–17
- Fenerbahçe (2021–present)
  - Triple Crown 2024–25
  - EuroLeague Championship: 2024–25
  - Turkish Championship: 2021–22, 2023–24, 2024–25, 2025–26
  - Turkish Cup: 2019, 2020, 2024, 2025, 2026
  - Turkish Presidential Cup: 2025

=== Managing individual ===
- EuroLeague's Executive of the Year: 2025
