= 2014–15 Turkish Basketball League =

Basketball league in Turkey

Turkish Basketball League
- Season: 2014–15
- Duration: October 11, 2014 – June 19, 2015
- Games played: 240 (regular season)
- Teams: 16
- TV partner: Lig TV

Regular season
- Relegated: Eskişehir Basket; Tofaş

Finals
- Champions: Pınar Karşıyaka (2nd title)
- Runners-up: Anadolu Efes
- Semifinalists: Fenerbahçe Ülker; Trabzonspor Medical Park
- Finals MVP: (Turkey) Bobby Dixon

Statistical leaders
Points	(United States) Matt Walsh	18.4
Rebounds	(United States) Alex Stepheson	9.2
Assists	(North Macedonia) Marques Green	8.9

Records
- Highest scoring: TED 113–112 Gaziantep (20 December 2014)
- Winning streak: 6 games Beşiktaş İntegral Forex; Fenerbahçe Ülker; Pınar Karşıyaka
- Losing streak: 8 games Eskişehir Basket
- Highest attendance: 13,800; Fenerbahçe Ülker 85–74 Galatasaray Liv Hospital (17 November 2014)
- All statistics correct as of 9 May 2015.

The 2014–15 Turkish Basketball League, was the 49th season of the top professional basketball league in Turkey.

The season started on October 11, 2014, and finished June 19, 2015. Fenerbahçe Ülker were the defending champions. Pınar Karşıyaka took the title, winning their second ever championship. Anadolu Efes were runners-up.

== Clubs and arenas ==
Locations of the 2014–15 Turkish Basketball League Clubs

Club	Location	Foun.Year	Arena	Capacity	Last Year	Head coach
Anadolu Efes	Istanbul	1976	Abdi İpekçi Arena	12,270	3rd(RS), QF(Play-off)	(Serbia) Dušan Ivković
Banvit	Bandırma	1994	Kara Ali Acar Sport Hall	2,500	1st(RS), SF(Play-off)	(Turkey) Selçuk Ernak
Beşiktaş İntegral Forex	Istanbul	1933	BJK Akatlar Arena	3,200	5th(RS), QF(Play-off)	(Finland) Henrik Dettmann
Darüşşafaka Doğuş	Istanbul	1951	Darüşşafaka Ayhan Şahenk Sports Hall	3,500	Winner (TB2L)	(Turkey) Oktay Mahmuti
Eskişehir Basket	Eskişehir	2006	Anadolu Üniversitesi Sport Hall	5,000	14th(RS)	(United States) Brad Greenberg
Fenerbahçe Ülker	Istanbul	1913	Ülker Sports Arena	13,800	2nd(RS), Winner(Play-off)	(Serbia) Željko Obradović
Galatasaray Liv Hospital	Istanbul	1911	Abdi İpekçi Arena	12,270	4th(RS), RU(Play-off)	(Turkey) Ergin Ataman
İstanbul BB	Istanbul	2000	Cebeci Sport Hall	1,250	2nd (TB2L)	(Bosnia and Herzegovina) Draško Prodanović
Pınar Karşıyaka	İzmir	1966	Karşıyaka Arena	5,000	6th(RS), SF(Play-off)	(Turkey) Ufuk Sarıca
Royal Halı Gaziantep	Gaziantep	2007	Karataş Şahinbey Sport Hall	6,400	10th(RS)	(Slovenia) Jure Zdovc
Rönesans TED Kolejliler	Ankara	1954	TOBB Sport Hall	2,000	12th(RS)	(Turkey) Hasan Özmeriç
Tofaş	Bursa	1974	Bursa Atatürk Sport Hall	2,900	8th(RS), QF(Play-off)	(Turkey) Fatih Elbaş
Torku Konyaspor	Konya	1987	Selçuklu Belediyesi Sport Hall	3,800	13th(RS)	(Turkey) Aziz Bekir
Trabzonspor Medical Park	Trabzon	2008	Hayri Gür Arena	7,500	9th(RS)	(Bosnia and Herzegovina) Nenad Marković
Türk Telekom	Ankara	1980	Ankara Arena	10,400	11th(RS)	(Turkey) Ercüment Sunter
Uşak Sportif	Uşak	2006	Uşak Üniversitesi Sport Hall	2,000	7th(RS), QF(Play-off)	(Turkey) Ozan Bulkaz

== Regular season ==
=== League table ===
Pos	Team	Pld	W	L	PF	PA	PD	Pts	Qualification or relegation
1	Fenerbahçe Ülker	30	23	7	2462	2189	+273	53	Qualification to playoffs
2	Anadolu Efes	30	22	8	2430	2183	+247	52	Qualification to playoffs
3	Darüşşafaka Doğuş	30	21	9	2384	2167	+217	51	Qualification to playoffs
4	Pınar Karşıyaka	30	19	11	2422	2288	+134	49	Qualification to playoffs
5	Banvit	30	16	14	2353	2315	+38	46	Qualification to playoffs
6	Trabzonspor Medical Park	30	16	14	2439	2394	+45	46	Qualification to playoffs
7	Türk Telekom	30	15	15	2378	2460	−82	45	Qualification to playoffs
8	Galatasaray Liv Hospital	30	15	15	2392	2392	0	45	Qualification to playoffs
9	Beşiktaş İntegral Forex	30	15	15	2357	2380	−23	45	
10	Royal Halı Gaziantep	30	14	16	2265	2233	+32	44	
11	Torku Konyaspor	30	12	18	2374	2512	−138	42	
12	İstanbul BB	30	12	18	2258	2429	−171	42	
13	Uşak Sportif	30	12	18	2340	2432	−92	42	
14	Rönesans TED Kolejliler	30	11	19	2383	2494	−111	41	
15	Eskişehir Basket (R)	30	9	21	2369	2546	−177	39	Relegation to TBL
16	Tofaş (R)	30	8	22	2255	2447	−192	38	Relegation to TBL

Source: TBL
(R) Relegated

=== Results ===
	AEF	TED	BAN	BJK	DAÇ	ESK	FBÜ	GSL	İBB	KSK	RHG	SEÜ	TOF	TTS	TSB	UŞK
Anadolu Efes		73–81	89–83	83–79	73–72	96–68	85–67	77–75	71–64	67–65	77–67	90–73	89–76	86–91	70–66	81–66
Aykon TED Kolejliler	67–69		79–80	83–88	70–82	81–72	62–71	67–75	73–84	94–92	113–112	87–90	79–76	70–72	78–89	88–84
Banvit	77–74	74–67		80–81	72–69	91–75	82–77	69–67	63–69	87–89	70–69	89–99	76–62	86–75	93–97	77–64
Beşiktaş İntegral Forex	77–78	94–81	96–87		68–84	87–79	74–94	64–65	80–66	87–82	70–81	84–74	65–72	76–59	68–58	86–67
Darüşşafaka Doğuş	61–83	91–93	69–67	74–71		82–89	51–73	77–79	83–61	82–66	64–46	84–57	88–61	108–82	88–68	80–67
Eskişehir Basket	81–79	97–85	89–81	82–81	66–90		69–89	66–61	81–69	62–91	92–81	68–89	78–80	88–79	80–83	61–69
Fenerbahçe Ülker	82–84	78–65	99–92	97–59	91–95	86–76		85–74	91–89	70–62	66–70	98–61	80–70	86–82	67–61	89–75
Galatasaray Liv Hospital	77–76	84–88	87–79	100–94	76–91	86–69	92–88		81–84	70–75	80–74	81–80	87–98	76–80	80–93	94–85
İstanbul BB	64–106	70–71	71–81	77–81	74–76	87–84	60–95	80–87		68–62	91–86	91–88	85–78	62–74	69–78	84–75
Pınar Karşıyaka	92–84	96–89	64–60	79–81	79–80	82–76	69–75	84–77	108–84		66–71	75–68	93–80	76–65	87–91	88–80
Royal Halı Gaziantep	65–63	82–60	64–68	81–88	69–72	88–80	59–71	76–64	78–49	65–81		87–78	69–51	88–77	77–69	84–81
Selçuk Üniversitesi	64–74	89–75	83–75	79–84	69–88	92–89	80–82	84–91	85–82	93–100	70–69		88–81	97–100	74–92	89–86
Tofaş	70–93	71–92	67–95	91–83	68–74	88–79	77–86	73–93	67–76	65–73	93–76	75–47		67–72	91–84	77–80
Türk Telekom	67–88	80–89	83–88	79–70	82–81	97–92	61–73	85–77	88–89	66–83	79–73	83–72	94–75		81–100	90–82
Trabzonspor Medical Park	71–97	88–73	66–71	98–75	67–75	93–91	75–87	72–70	92–88	73–75	74–88	70–76	93–80	86–76		114–88
Uşak Sportif	76–75	91–83	75–61	70–66	80–73	103–90	78–69	79–86	66–71	78–88	76–70	82–86	80–75	76–79	81–78	

Last updated: 9 May 2015.
Source: TBL Fixtures

== Playoffs ==
Quarterfinals
1	Fenerbahçe Ülker	2
8	Galatasaray Liv Hospital	1
4	Pınar Karşıyaka	2
5	Banvit	1
2	Anadolu Efes	2
7	Türk Telekom	1
3	Darüşşafaka Doğuş	0
6	Trabzonspor Medical Park	2

Semifinals
1	Fenerbahçe Ülker	1
4	Pınar Karşıyaka	3
2	Anadolu Efes	3
6	Trabzonspor Medical Park	0

Finals
4	Pınar Karşıyaka	4
2	Anadolu Efes	2

== Individual statistics ==
=== Points ===
Rank	Name	Team	Games	Points	PPG
1.	(United States) Matt Walsh	Eskişehir Basket	27	497	18.4
2.	(United States) Troy DeVries	Torku Konyaspor	24	408	17.0
3.	(Turkey) Bobby Dixon	Pınar Karşıyaka	30	506	16.9

=== Rebounds ===
Rank	Name	Team	Games	Rebounds	RPG
1.	(United States) Alex Stepheson	İstanbul B.B.	29	267	9.2
2.	(Serbia) Nemanja Bjelica	Fenerbahçe Ülker	27	216	8.0
3.	(United States) Patric Young	Galatasaray Liv Hospital	21	167	8.0

=== Assists ===
Rank	Name	Team	Games	Assists	APG
1.	(North Macedonia) Marques Green	Rönesans TED Kolejliler	21	186	8.9
2.	(Puerto Rico) Carlos Arroyo	Galatasaray Liv Hospital	17	85	5.0
3.	(United States) Jerome Randle	Eskişehir Basket	27	125	4.6

=== Blocks ===
Rank	Name	Team	Games	Blocks	BPG
1.	(United States) Sean Williams	Torku Konyaspor	23	45	2.0
2.	(United States) Eric Buckner	Uşak Sportif	30	50	1.7
3.	(Czech Republic) Jan Veselý	Fenerbahçe Ülker	29	40	1.4

=== Steals ===
Rank	Name	Team	Games	Steals	SPG
1.	(United States) Jamon Gordon	Darüşşafaka Doğuş	30	62	2.1
2.	(Cameroon) D. J. Strawberry	Pınar Karşıyaka	30	57	1.9
3.	(Turkey) Bobby Dixon	Pınar Karşıyaka	30	57	1.9

== Turkish Basketball League clubs in European competitions ==
Team	Competition	Progress
Fenerbahçe Ülker	Euroleague	Final 4
Anadolu Efes	Euroleague	Quarterfinals
Galatasaray Liv Hospital	Euroleague	Top 16
Banvit	Eurocup	Semifinals
Pınar Karşıyaka	Eurocup	Quarterfinals
Beşiktaş Integral Forex	Eurocup	Last 32
Trabzonspor Medical Park	EuroChallenge	Runner-up
Uşak Sportif	EuroChallenge	Top 16
Tofaş	EuroChallenge	Regular Season

== All-Star Game ==
Team Europe
Pos	Player	Team
Starters
G	(Puerto Rico) Carlos Arroyo	Galatasaray Liv Hospital
G	(Turkey) Furkan Korkmaz	Anadolu Efes
F	(Turkey) Cedi Osman	Anadolu Efes
F	(Croatia) Dario Šarić	Anadolu Efes
C	(United States) Patric Young	Galatasaray Liv Hospital
Reserves
G	(Lithuania) Renaldas Seibutis	Darüşşafaka Doğuş
G	(Turkey) Sinan Güler	Galatasaray Liv Hospital
G	(United States) Jamon Gordon	Darüşşafaka Doğuş
F	(Australia) Ryan Broekhoff	Beşiktaş İntegral Forex
F	(United States) John Shurna	Darüşşafaka Doğuş
F	(United States) Alex Stepheson	İstanbul BB
C	(Montenegro) Milko Bjelica	Anadolu Efes
Head coach: (Turkey) Ahmet Kandemir (Beşiktaş İntegral Forex)

Team Asia
Pos	Player	Team
Starters
G	(Turkey) Bobby Dixon	Pınar Karşıyaka
G	(United States) Andrew Goudelock	Fenerbahçe Ülker
F	(Turkey) Emir Preldžić	Fenerbahçe Ülker
F	(Czech Republic) Jan Veselý	Fenerbahçe Ülker
C	(Turkey) Semih Erden	Fenerbahçe Ülker
Reserves
G	(Turkey) Şafak Edge	Banvit
G	(Dominican Republic) Sammy Mejia	Banvit
G	(United States) Cory Higgins	Royal Halı Gaziantep
F	(United States) Matt Walsh	Eskişehir Basket
F	(United States) Josh Carter	Türk Telekom
F	(United States) Jawad Williams	Royal Halı Gaziantep
C	(United States) Sean Williams	Torku Konyaspor
Head coach: (Serbia) Zoran Lukić (Banvit)

January 18, 2015
16:00 EEST

Team Europe	138–130	Team Asia
Scoring by quarter: 26–32, 40–28, 35–33, 37–37
Pts: Cedi Osman 20; Rebs: Carlos Arroyo 11; Asts: Carlos Arroyo 22		Pts: Semih Erden 24; Rebs: Semih Erden 7 Asts: Matt Walsh 5

Ankara Arena, Ankara
Attendance: 10,500
Referees: Aytuğ Ekti, Halil Baldemir, Mehmet Şahin

== Awards ==
=== Finals MVP ===
- (United States) (Turkey) Bobby Dixon – Pınar Karşıyaka

=== All-Star Game MVP ===
- (Puerto Rico) Carlos Arroyo – Galatasaray Liv Hospital

== See also ==
- 2014–15 Turkish Basketball Cup
