= Ufuk Sarıca =

Turkish basketball player and coach

Esenler Erokspor
- Title: Head coach
- League: Basketbol Süper Ligi

Personal information
- Born: June 13, 1972 (age 54) Istanbul, Turkey
- Listed height: 1.94 m (6 ft 4 in)

Career information
- Playing career: 1989–2004
- Position: Shooting guard
- Number: 15
- Coaching career: 2006–present

Career history

Playing
- 1989–1999: Efes Pilsen
- 1999–2001: Ülkerspor
- 2001: Bnei Herzliya
- 2001: Montepaschi Siena
- 2001–2002: Pınar Karşıyaka
- 2002–2003: Darüşşafaka
- 2003–2004: Beşiktaş

Coaching
- 2006–2007: Beşiktaş (assistant)
- 2007: Beşiktaş
- 2007–2008: Beşiktaş (assistant)
- 2008–2011: Anadolu Efes (assistant)
- 2011–2012: Anadolu Efes
- 2012–2016: Pınar Karşıyaka
- 2014–2017: Turkey (assistant)
- 2016–2018: Beşiktaş
- 2017–2020: Turkey
- 2019–2025: Pınar Karşıyaka
- 2025–present: Esenler Erokspor

Career highlights
- As player: 6× Turkish League champion (1992–1994, 1996, 1997, 2001); 4× Turkish Cup winner (1994, 1996–1998); 3× Turkish President's Cup winner (1993, 1995, 1998); FIBA Korać Cup champion (1996); As head coach: Turkish League champion (2015); Turkish Cup winner (2014); Turkish President's Cup winner (2014)

Ufuk Sarıca (born June 13, 1972) is a Turkish professional basketball coach and former player who played at the shooting guard position. He is the current head coach for Esenler Erokspor of the Basketbol Süper Ligi (BSL).

== Playing career ==
Sarıca began his career at the age of 16 at Efes Pilsen's Youth Team, and played for Efes for 11 consecutive seasons. During his time at Efes, he won the Korać Cup in 1996, beating Italian side Olimpia Milano at the two-legged final. While with Efes Pilsen he reached the European Cup final as well as playing in the EuroLeague Quarter-finals 4 times (3 of these quarterfinals were consecutive between 1997 and 1999). He was part of the strong Efes roster along with Hidayet Türkoğlu, Ömer Onan, and Hüseyin Beşok. He left the team in the summer of 1999 after important members of the legendary Efes Team of 1996, Tamer Oyguç, Murat Evliyaoğlu, and Volkan Aydın, were let go from the club.

He joined Ülkerspor where he won the Turkish League title during the 2000–2001 season. As Harun Erdenay became more influential in the forward position his playing time was limited and as such he moved to Israeli side Bnei Herzliya. This was followed by a short spell at Montepaschi Siena.

After Siena, Sarica returned to Turkey and played at Pınar Karşıyaka, Darüşşafaka, and Beşiktaş Cola Turka, each for a single season, after which he retired.

== Coaching career ==
=== First years ===
Sarıca began his post-retirement career as the assistant of Murat Didin at Beşiktaş. When Didin left the club in March 2007, Sarıca was appointed as caretaker manager until the end of the season. Then he worked with Ergin Ataman as assistant coach at Beşiktaş again where they reached the TBL play-off semi-finals in the 2007-08 season. Ataman left the Beşiktaş and joined Efes Pilsen at the end of the season and Sarıca joined Efes Pilsen as the assistant coach of Ataman once again. He became head coach on an interim basis during the 2010–11 season and was handed the role as permanent head coach in June 2011.

=== Karşıyaka ===
On July 17, 2012, he signed a two-year contract with Pınar Karşıyaka. He won the Turkish Cup championship in the 2013–14 season. On June 5, 2014, he signed an extension contract with Pınar Karşıyaka until 2015. On June 19, 2015, he won the Turkish League championship in 2014–15 season by beating Fenerbahçe Ülker and Efes Pilsen in semifinals and finals.

=== Beşiktaş ===
He signed a three-year contract with Beşiktaş on August 2, 2016.

=== Return to Karşıyaka ===
On June 25, 2019, he has signed 3-years deal with former team Pınar Karşıyaka. In June 2025, he parted ways with Pınar Karşıyaka.

=== Esenler Erokspor ===
On July 9, 2025, he signed with Esenler Erokspor of the Basketbol Süper Ligi (BSL).

== Achievements ==
=== As player ===
- Turkish League (with Efes Pilsen: 1991–92, 1992–93, 1993–94, 1995–96, 1996–97; with Ülkerspor: 2000–01)
- Turkish Cup (with Efes Pilsen: 1993–94, 1995–96, 1996–97, 1997–98)
- Turkish Basketball President's Cup (with Efes Pilsen: 1993, 1996, 1998)
- Korać Cup: (with Efes Pilsen: 1995–96)

=== As head coach ===
- Turkish League (with Pınar Karşıyaka: 2014–15)
- Turkish Cup (with Pınar Karşıyaka: 2013–14)
- Turkish Basketball President's Cup (with Pınar Karşıyaka: 2014)
