= Bobby Dixon =

American-Turkish basketball player

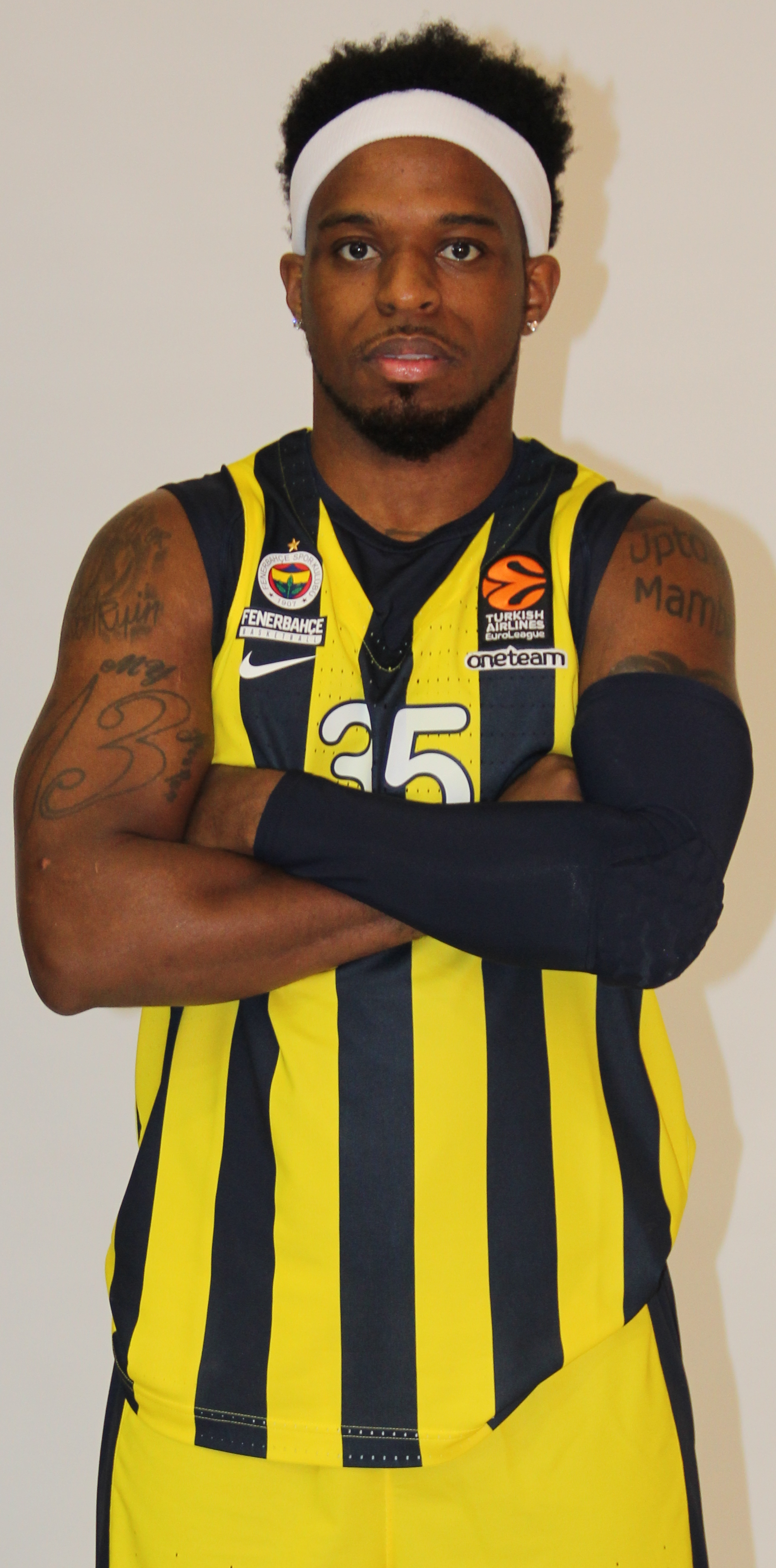
- Dixon in 2018

Personal information
- Born: April 10, 1983 (age 43) Chicago, Illinois, U.S.
- Listed height: 5 ft 10 in (1.78 m)
- Listed weight: 160 lb (73 kg)

Career information
- High school: Sullivan (Chicago, Illinois)
- College: Kankakee CC (2002–2004); Troy (2004–2006)
- NBA draft: 2006: undrafted
- Playing career: 2006–2021
- Position: Point guard / shooting guard
- Number: 13, 35

Career history
- 2006–2007: Saint-Étienne
- 2007: BCM Gravelines
- 2007–2008: Polpak Świecie
- 2008–2009: Benetton Treviso
- 2009: Le Mans
- 2009–2010: ASVEL
- 2010: Benetton Treviso
- 2010–2011: Enel Brindisi
- 2011–2012: JDA Dijon
- 2012–2015: Karşıyaka
- 2015–2021: Fenerbahçe

Career highlights
- EuroLeague champion (2017); All-Europe Second Team (2015); 4× TBSL champion (2015–2018); TBSL Finals MVP (2015); 4× Turkish Cup winner (2014, 2016, 2019, 2020); Turkish Cup MVP (2014); All-EuroCup Second Team (2015); 4× Turkish League All-Star (2013, 2015, 2016, 2019); 3× Turkish President's Cup winner (2014, 2016, 2017); Turkish President's Cup MVP (2016); 2× French Leaders Cup winner (2009, 2010)

Bobby Dixon or Ali Muhammed (born April 10, 1983), is an American-born naturalized Turkish former professional basketball player who played at the point guard position. He also represented the senior Turkish national basketball team, as he holds Turkish citizenship since 2015, under the name of Ali Muhammed.

== College career ==
After graduating from Chicago's Sullivan High School, Dixon played college basketball at Troy University. In his two-year career with the Trojans, he played in 59 games, averaging 16.3 points, 4.6 rebounds, and 5.3 assists per game. He was also named to the 2005–06 All-Sun Belt Conference First Team.

== Professional career ==
Dixon started his professional career in France with Saint-Étienne Basket. In May 2007, he signed a contract with the French League team Gravelines until the end of the season. In the summer of 2007, he signed a contract with Polpak Świecie of the Polish Basketball League. He led the 2007–08 season Polish League in assists, averaging 5.1 per game. In the summer of 2008, he signed a contract with the Italian League team Pallacanestro Treviso. In February 2009, he moved to the France again, signed by Le Mans Sarthe Basket. In the summer of 2009, he signed a contract with the French League team ASVEL Basket. In 2010, he moved to the Italy, signed by Pallacanestro Treviso again. In the summer of 2010, he signed a contract with the Italian League team New Basket Brindisi. In the summer of 2011, he signed a contract with the French League team Dijon Basket.

=== Karşıyaka (2012–2015) ===
In July 2012, Dixon signed a contract with Karşıyaka of the Turkish League. On February 9, 2014, he was named the MVP with 19 points, 5 rebounds, and 6 assists in the Turkish Cup final game against Anadolu Efes S.K. He also helped to lead them to a Turkish President's Cup victory against Fenerbahçe in 2014. He was named to the All-EuroCup Second Team in the 2014–15 EuroCup season. On June 19, 2015, he won the Turkish League championship with Karşıyaka, after beating Anadolu Efes by a series score of 4–1 in the Turkish League Finals. Dixon was named the Turkish League Finals MVP.

=== Fenerbahçe (2015–2021) ===
On July 21, 2015, Dixon signed a two-year contract with Fenerbahçe. On March 28, 2016, he had a 23 points, 12 rebounds, and 10 assists performance against Beşiktaş, which marked his first triple double in the team. That triple double, was the third in Fenerbahce history, after Mark Dickel had a 16 points, 13 rebounds, and 11 assists performance against Galatasaray, in the 2002–03 season; and Emir Preldžić had 10 points, 15 rebounds, and 10 assists against Olin Edirne, in the 2010–11 season.

In 2017–18 EuroLeague, Fenerbahçe made it to the 2018 EuroLeague Final Four, its fourth consecutive Final Four appearance. Eventually, they lost to Real Madrid with 80–85 in the final game. Over 20 EuroLeague games, he averaged 7 points, 1.1 rebounds and 1.2 assists per game, in decreased playing time over last season.

In April 2019, he signed a new two-year contract with Fenerbahçe, staying at the club until the end of 2020–21 season. Dixon parted ways with the team on September 14, 2021.

On October 14, 2021, he has announced his retirement from professional basketball and started to work as a Youth Coach for Fenerbahçe Beko.

== National team career ==
After receiving Turkish citizenship, Dixon became a member of the senior men's Turkish national basketball team. With the Turkish national team, he played at the EuroBasket 2015, and the Manila 2016 FIBA World Olympic Qualifying Tournament.

== Career statistics ==
Legend
GP	Games played	GS	Games started	MPG	Minutes per game
FG%	Field-goal percentage	3P%	3-point field-goal percentage	FT%	Free-throw percentage
RPG	Rebounds per game	APG	Assists per game	SPG	Steals per game
BPG	Blocks per game	PPG	Points per game	PIR	Performance index rating
**Bold**	Career high

=== EuroLeague ===
†	Denotes seasons in which Dixon won the EuroLeague

Year	Team	GP	GS	MPG	FG%	3P%	FT%	RPG	APG	SPG	BPG	PPG	PIR
2009–10	ASVEL Basket	10	10	**28.0**	.451	.353	.750	2.6	3.1	**1.4**	—	**11.5**	9.8
2015–16	Fenerbahçe	28	21	24.7	.405	.379	.895	**3.3**	**3.6**	1.0	**.1**	10.8	**11.4**
2016–17†	Fenerbahçe	**34**	**25**	25.3	.414	.388	.906	2.7	3.1	1.0	—	11.4	10.7
2017–18	Fenerbahçe	21	6	11.3	.468	.462	.750	1.1	1.2	.3	—	7.0	6.2
2018–19	Fenerbahçe	**34**	22	17.8	.518	**.496**	.867	1.7	2.2	.6	—	9.3	8.9
2019–20	Fenerbahçe	22	2	14.3	**.577**	.364	**.947**	1.3	1.3	.5	—	5.5	5.0
2020–21	Fenerbahçe	17	3	17.8	.464	.442	.800	1.8	1.6	.4	—	5.8	5.6
Career		166	89	19.4	.496	.412	.873	2.1	2.4	.7	.2	8.9	8.5

=== Domestic leagues ===
Season	Team	League	GP	MPG	FG%	3P%	FT%	RPG	APG	SPG	BPG	PPG
2006–07	Saint-Étienne Basket	Pro B	34	31.9	.393	.358	.798	5.0	4.2	**1.9**	.0	17.0
2006–07	BCM Gravelines	Pro A	3	31.7	.340	.273	**1.000**	**6.0**	4.0	1.7	.0	7.7
2007–08	Polpak Świecie	PLK	**42**	32.8	.498	.358	.750	4.7	5.1	2.1	.0	16.6
2008–09	Benetton Treviso	LBA	17	31.5	.418	.381	.833	2.9	3.8	3.1	**.1**	12.4
2008–09	Le Mans	Pro A	17	31.5	.400	.382	.782	4.7	**5.8**	2.1	.0	15.4
2009–10	ASVEL Basket	Pro A	18	24.8	.525	.314	.682	3.3	3.4	1.6	.0	10.4
2009–10	Benetton Treviso	LBA	9	29.2	.500	.375	.737	4.0	2.8	1.4	**.1**	11.8
2010–11	Enel Brindisi	LBA	29	30.6	.455	.321	.780	4.3	2.9	2.0	.0	12.6
2011–12	JDA Dijon	Pro A	30	31.0	.447	.326	.753	4.1	5.1	1.6	**.1**	12.4
2012–13	Karşıyaka	BSL	33	29.8	.421	.402	.744	4.5	4.7	1.2	**.1**	15.3
2013–14	Karşıyaka	BSL	35	32.4	.485	.349	.766	3.5	4.7	1.3	**.1**	14.0
2014–15	Karşıyaka	BSL	**42**	**33.3**	.478	.387	.838	3.8	4.5	**1.9**	.0	**17.3**
2015–16	Fenerbahçe	BSL	**42**	25.1	.448	.379	.832	2.8	3.6	1.1	.0	12.8
2016–17	Fenerbahçe	BSL	35	22.5	.480	.363	.821	2.5	3.1	1.2	.0	9.9
2017–18	Fenerbahçe	BSL	36	15.1	.480	.390	.895	1.4	2.1	.7	.0	6.4
2018–19	Fenerbahçe	BSL	38	21.2	**.530**	**.440**	.837	2.4	2.3	.8	.0	10.2
Career			460	84	.457	.457	.805	.866	3.7	1.6	.1	12.6

== Personal ==
In June 2015, Dixon received a Turkish passport and citizenship, which legally changed his name in Turkey to Ali Muhammed.
