= 2014–15 Turkish Basketball Cup =

Turkish Basketball Cup
- Official logo
- Duration: 2 October 2014 – 22 February 2015
- Games played: 31
- Teams: 16
- TV partner: NTV Spor

Finals
- Champions: Anadolu Efes (10th title)
- Runners-up: Fenerbahçe Ülker

Awards
- Final MVP: (France) Thomas Heurtel

The 2014–15 Turkish Basketball Cup tournament, for sponsorship reasons the FIAT Turkish Cup, is the 29th edition of what the professional men's basketball teams of Turkey could vie for the Turkish Cup in the final. The tournament was held at the Bursa Atatürk Sport Hall in Bursa, Turkey. It was held from 17 to 21 February.

== Group stage ==
=== Group A ===
| Pos | Team | Pld | W | L | PF | PA | PD | Pts | Qualification or relegation |
|---|---|---|---|---|---|---|---|---|---|
| 1 | Galatasaray Liv Hospital | 3 | 2 | 1 | 230 | 238 | −8 | 5 | Advance to Final 8 |
| 2 | Royal Halı Gaziantep | 3 | 2 | 1 | 236 | 211 | +25 | 5 | Advance to Final 8 |
| 3 | Torku Konyaspor | 3 | 1 | 2 | 227 | 247 | −20 | 4 | |
| 4 | Uşak Sportif | 3 | 1 | 2 | 257 | 254 | +3 | 4 | |

Source: Turkish Basketball Federation

=== Group B ===
| Pos | Team | Pld | W | L | PF | PA | PD | Pts | Qualification or relegation |
|---|---|---|---|---|---|---|---|---|---|
| 1 | Anadolu Efes | 3 | 2 | 1 | 236 | 212 | +24 | 5 | Advance to Final 8 |
| 2 | Darüşşafaka Doğuş | 3 | 2 | 1 | 231 | 238 | −7 | 5 | Advance to Final 8 |
| 3 | Beşiktaş İntegral Forex | 3 | 1 | 2 | 192 | 224 | −32 | 4 | |
| 4 | Türk Telekom | 3 | 1 | 2 | 203 | 218 | −15 | 4 | |

Source: Turkish Basketball Federation

=== Group C ===
| Pos | Team | Pld | W | L | PF | PA | PD | Pts | Qualification or relegation |
|---|---|---|---|---|---|---|---|---|---|
| 1 | Fenerbahçe Ülker | 3 | 3 | 0 | 247 | 197 | +50 | 6 | Advance to Final 8 |
| 2 | Rönesans TED Kolejliler | 3 | 2 | 1 | 220 | 228 | −8 | 5 | Advance to Final 8 |
| 3 | İstanbul BB | 3 | 1 | 2 | 213 | 246 | −33 | 4 | |
| 4 | Tofaş | 3 | 0 | 3 | 240 | 249 | −9 | 3 | |

Source: Turkish Basketball Federation

=== Group D ===
| Pos | Team | Pld | W | L | PF | PA | PD | Pts | Qualification or relegation |
|---|---|---|---|---|---|---|---|---|---|
| 1 | Pınar Karşıyaka | 3 | 3 | 0 | 240 | 197 | +43 | 6 | Advance to Final 8 |
| 2 | Banvit | 3 | 2 | 1 | 222 | 212 | +10 | 5 | Advance to Final 8 |
| 3 | Trabzonspor Medical Park | 3 | 1 | 2 | 224 | 247 | −23 | 4 | |
| 4 | Eskişehir Basket | 3 | 0 | 3 | 212 | 242 | −30 | 3 | |

Source: Turkish Basketball Federation

== Final 8 ==
The Final 8 played a knock-out tournament at the Karataş Şahinbey Sport Hall in Gaziantep, Turkey.

Quarterfinals
Pınar Karşıyaka | 89
Banvit | 64
Royal Halı Gaziantep | 72
Fenerbahçe Ülker | 73
Rönesans TED Ankara Kolejliler | 50
Darüşşafaka Doğuş | 69
Anadolu Efes | 79
Galatasaray Liv Hospital | 73

Semifinals
Pınar Karşıyaka | 69
Fenerbahçe Ülker | 74
Darüşşafaka Doğuş | 73
Anadolu Efes | 88

Finals
Fenerbahçe Ülker | 60
Anadolu Efes | 70

== Final ==
| February 22, 2015 | Fenerbahçe Ülker | 60–70 | Anadolu Efes | Gaziantep |
| 20:30 | Scoring by quarter: 15–15, 17–22, 14–18, 13–19 |
| | Pts: Veselý 13; Rebs: Veselý 9 Asts: Goudelock 4 | Boxscore | Pts: Šarić 17; Rebs: Krstić 12; Asts: Heurtel 6 | Arena: Karataş Şahinbey Sport Hall; Referees: Recep Ankaralı, Murat Biricik, Rüştü Nuran |

| Fenerbahçe | Anadolu Efes |

| Starters: | | | Pts | Reb | Ast |
|---|---|---|---|---|---|
| G | 2 | (United States) Andrew Goudelock | 3 | 2 | 4 |
| G | 3 | (Georgia (country)) Ricky Hickman | 12 | 1 | 4 |
| G | 4 | (Greece) Nikos Zisis | 4 | 1 | 1 |
| F | 8 | (Serbia) Nemanja Bjelica | 10 | 8 | 0 |
| C | 9 | (Turkey) Semih Erden | 2 | 0 | 0 |
| G | 10 | (Turkey) Melih Mahmutoglu | 4 | 1 | 0 |
| F | 15 | (Turkey) Serhat Cetin | DNP | | |
| F | 21 | (Turkey) Oğuz Savaş | 6 | 2 | 0 |
| F | 22 | (Serbia) Luka Zoric | 0 | 1 | 0 |
| F | 24 | (Czech Republic) Jan Veselý | 13 | 9 | 1 |
| F | 25 | (Turkey) Kenan Sipahi | 0 | 2 | 1 |
| F | 55 | (Turkey) Emir Preldžić | 6 | 3 | 2 |
Head coach:
(Serbia) Željko Obradović

MVP
(France) Thomas Heurtel
Game rules
Game was played under FIBA rules.

Karataş Şahinbey Sport Hall

2015 Turkish Cup Winners
Anadolu Efes
(10th title)

| Starters: | | | Pts | Reb | Ast |
|---|---|---|---|---|---|
| G | 4 | (Turkey) Doğuş Balbay | 4 | 4 | 1 |
| G | 6 | (Turkey) Cedi Osman | 6 | 4 | 1 |
| F | 7 | (Greece) Efstratios Perperoglou | 3 | 6 | 1 |
| F | 8 | (Turkey) Birkan Batuk | 3 | 2 | 0 |
| F | 9 | (Croatia) Dario Šarić | 17 | 9 | 2 |
| C | 12 | (Serbia) | 13 | 12 | 1 |
| F | 13 | (Gabon) Stéphane Lasme | 8 | 3 | 0 |
| F | 22 | (Turkey) Furkan Korkmaz | 0 | 0 | 0 |
| F | 23 | (United States) Matt Janning | 4 | 3 | 0 |
| G | 31 | (France) Thomas Heurtel | 12 | 1 | 6 |
| F | 32 | (Turkey) Mükremin Kilicli | 0 | 0 | 0 |
| F | 41 | (Turkey) Emircan Kosut | 0 | 0 | 0 |
Head coach:
(Serbia) Dušan Ivković

== See also ==
- 2014–15 Turkish Basketball League
