= 2013 Turkish Basketball Presidential Cup =

Galatasaray Liv Hospital	Fenerbahçe Ülker
62	64
- Date: 9 October 2013
- Venue: Yaşar Doğu Sports Hall, Samsun

The 2013 Turkish Basketball Presidential Cup (Turkish: 2013 Erkekler Basketbol Cumhurbaşkanlığı Kupası) was the 29th edition of the Turkish Basketball Presidential Cup. The game was played on 9 October 2013 at Yaşar Doğu Sports Hall between Galatasaray Liv Hospital, champions of the 2012–13 Turkish Basketball League, and Fenerbahçe Ülker, winners of the 2012–13 Turkish Cup.

Fenerbahçe won the game 64–62 for their 5th title.

== Venue ==
Samsun	2013 Turkish Basketball Presidential Cup (Turkey)
Yaşar Doğu Sports Hall	2013 Turkish Basketball Presidential Cup (Turkey)
Capacity: 7,500	2013 Turkish Basketball Presidential Cup (Turkey)

== Match details ==
=== Summary ===
Galatasaray Liv Hospital started the game strongly with Ersin Dağlı contributing early points, while Cenk Akyol and Jamont Gordon responded from beyond the arc to counter Gašper Vidmar's inside baskets. Galatasaray led 19–16 at the end of the first quarter. Fenerbahçe Ülker took control early in the second quarter with Emir Preldžić scoring, but Galatasaray regained the lead through Furkan Aldemir and Carlos Arroyo, entering halftime ahead 37–33.

In the third quarter, Galatasaray extended the lead to nine points (48–39) by converting rebounds into points, though Bojan Bogdanović's three-pointer kept Fenerbahçe close. The teams exchanged leads in the fourth quarter, with Luka Žorić and Linas Kleiza scoring for Fenerbahçe and Furkan Aldemir responding for Galatasaray. Fenerbahçe capitalized on fewer mistakes in the final two minutes, with Emir Preldžić contributing crucial points, securing a 64–62 victory.

=== Details ===
9 October 2013	Galatasaray Liv Hospital	62–64	Fenerbahçe Ülker	Samsun
19:00 EEST (UTC+3)	Scoring by quarter: 19–16, 16–17, 11–11, 16–20
	Pts: Gordon 16; Rebs: Dağlı 10; Asts: Arroyo 4 PIR: Gordon 19	Boxscore	Pts: Preldžič 14; Rebs: Vidmar 10; Asts: Preldžič, Bogdanović 3 PIR: Preldžič 16	Arena: Yaşar Doğu Sports Hall; Referees: Fatih Söylemezoğlu, Emin Moğulkoç, Kaan Büyükçil

Starters:			Pts	Reb	Ast
PG	30	(Puerto Rico) Carlos Arroyo	9	4	4
SG	5	(United States) Jamont Gordon	16	9	2
SF	17	(Turkey) Cenk Akyol	8	0	1
PF	35	(Turkey) Ersin Dağlı	6	10	3
C	19	(Turkey) Furkan Aldemir	11	8	1
Reserves:					
PF	4	(Serbia) Zoran Erceg	3	0	2
G/F	7	(Turkey) Göksenin Köksal	2	1	0
C	11	(Australia) Nathan Jawai	4	1	0
G	32	(Turkey) Sinan Güler	DNP		
G	33	(Turkey) Ender Arslan	0	1	2
C	34	(Turkey) Doğukan Sönmez	DNP		
SG	44	(Bosnia and Herzegovina) Henry Domercant	3	0	0
Head coach:
(Turkish Basketball Federation) Ergin Ataman

Galatasaray	Fenerbahçe

Galatasaray	Statistics	Fenerbahçe
11/27 (40,7%)	2-pt field goals	22/39 (56,4%)
10/29 (34,5%)	3-pt field goals	3/18 (16,7%)
10/16 (62,5%)	Free throws	11/15 (73,3%)
8	Offensive rebounds	8
26	Defensive rebounds	25
34	Total rebounds	33
15	Assists	9
12	Turnovers	11
3	Steals	5
0	Blocks	2
17	Fouls	25

2013 Turkish Presidential Cup champions
Fenerbahçe Ülker
(5th title)

Starters:			Pts	Reb	Ast
PG	4	(North Macedonia) Bo McCalebb	4	2	2
SG	10	(Turkey) Melih Mahmutoğlu	2	2	0
SF	55	(Turkey) Emir Preldžić	14	3	3
PF	11	(Lithuania) Linas Kleiza	11	6	0
C	22	(Croatia) Luka Žorić	12	6	0
Reserves:					
PG	9	(Turkey) Barış Ermiş	8	0	3
F/C	12	(Turkey) İzzet Türkyılmaz	DNP		
C	13	(Slovenia) Gašper Vidmar	8	10	0
F	17	(Turkey) Ayberk Olmaz	DNP		
PG	25	(Turkey) Kenan Sipahi	7	0	1
F	33	(Turkey) Metecan Birsen	DNP		
F	44	(Croatia) Bojan Bogdanović	6	1	3
Head coach:
(Basketball Federation of Serbia) Željko Obradović
