= Anadolu Üniversitesi Sport Hall =

Sports venue in Turkey

- Anadolu Üniversitesi Spor Salonu
- Interactive map of Anadolu Üniversitesi Sport Hall
- Location: Tepebaşı, Eskişehir, Turkey
- Coordinates: 39.7914°N 30.4997°E
- Owner: Anadolu University
- Capacity: 5,000

Construction
- Opened: 2011; 15 years ago

Tenant
- Eskişehir Basket

Anadolu Üniversitesi Sport Hall (Turkish: Anadolu Üniversitesi Spor Salonu) is an indoor multi-purpose sport venue that is located in the Anadolu University 2 Eylül Campus, Eskişehir, Turkey. The hall, with a capacity for 5,000 spectators, was built in 2011. It is home to Eskişehir Basket, which plays currently in the Turkish Basketball League.
