= 2013–14 Turkish Basketball Cup =

- League: Turkish Basketball Cup
- Sport: Basketball
- Duration: October 2013 – February 2014
- Top scorer: (Turkey) Bobby Dixon (108) (Pınar Karşıyaka)
- Finals champions: Pınar Karşıyaka (1st title)
- Runners-up: Anadolu Efes
- Finals MVP: (Turkey) Bobby Dixon

Turkish Basketball Men Cup seasons
- ← 2012–13 2014–15 →

The 2013–14 Spor Toto Turkish Cup was the 28th season of the Turkish Basketball Cup. Pınar Karşıyaka won their first title by beating Anadolu Efes in the final.

== Bracket ==
Quarter-finals
05 February 2014, 18:00
Pınar Karşıyaka	87
Türk Telekom	80
05 February 2014, 20:30
Fenerbahçe Ülker	72
Trabzonspor Medical Park	66
06 February 2014, 18:00
Galatasaray Liv Hospital	68
Tofaş	56
06 February 2014, 20:30
Beşiktaş İntegral Forex	59
Anadolu Efes	76

Semi-finals
07 February 2014, 18:00
Pınar Karşıyaka	82
Fenerbahçe Ülker	73
07 February 2014, 20:30
Galatasaray Liv Hospital	64
Anadolu Efes	69

Final
09 February 2014, 16:00
Pınar Karşıyaka	66
Anadolu Efes	65

== Quarterfinals ==
5 February 2014
18:00

Boxscore

Pınar Karşıyaka	87–80 (OT)	Türk Telekom
Scoring by quarter: 21 - 24, 9 - 12, 24 - 16, 16 - 18, Overtime: 17 - 10
Pts: Batista 21; Rebs: Batista 10; Asts: Dixon 6		Pts: Tunçeri 22; Rebs: Sonkol 8 Asts: Tunçeri 7

Ankara Arena, Ankara
Referees: Recep Ankaralı, Yener Yılmaz, Fatih Arslanoğlu

5 February 2014
20:30

Boxscore

Fenerbahçe Ülker	72–66	Trabzonspor Medical Park
Scoring by quarter: 22 - 14, 28 - 15, 9 - 24, 13 - 13
Pts: Kleiza 21; Rebs: Preldžić 11; Asts: Preldžić 6		Pts: Penney 21; Rebs: Stipanović, Külçebaş 5 Asts: Randle 7

Ankara Arena, Ankara
Referees: Murat Biricik, Ahmet Ersan Ergüler, Ziya Özorhon

6 February 2014
18:00

Boxscore

Galatasaray Liv Hospital	68–56	Tofaş S.K.
Scoring by quarter: 14 - 15, 19 - 15, 18 - 19, 17 - 7
Pts: Arslan 12; Rebs: Aldemir 14; Asts: Arslan 5		Pts: Elonu 14; Rebs: Elonu 11; Asts: Çetin 5

Ankara Arena, Ankara
Referees: Emin Moğulkoç, Halil Baldemir, Mehmet Şahin

6 February 2014
20:30

Boxscore

Beşiktaş İntegral Forex	59–76	Anadolu Efes
Scoring by quarter: 11 - 18, 16 - 27, 18 - 19, 14- 12
Pts: Broekhoff 15; Rebs: Ruziç 6 Asts: Perkins, Yağmur 3		Pts: Vasileiadis 15; Rebs: Balbay 8 Asts: Gordon 4

Ankara Arena, Ankara
Referees: Mehmet Keseratar, Rüştü Nuran, Kaan Büyükçil

== Semifinals ==
7 February 2014
18:00

Boxscore

Pınar Karşıyaka	82–73	Fenerbahçe Ülker
Scoring by quarter: 21 - 13, 19 - 17, 19 - 14, 23 - 29
Pts: Williams 16; Rebs: Batista 6 Asts: Dixon 9		Pts: Preldžić 15; Rebs: McCalebb 8 Asts: Preldžić, McCalebb 5

Ankara Arena, Ankara
Referees: Mehmet Keseratar, Emin Moğulkoç, Halil Baldemir

7 February 2014
20:30

Boxscore

Galatasaray Liv Hospital	64–69	Anadolu Efes
Scoring by quarter: 13 - 11, 19 - 12, 14 - 25', 18 - 21
Pts: Arroyo 30; Rebs: Aldemir 12; Asts: üç oyuncu 2		Pts: Gordon 16; Rebs: Gönlüm 9 Asts: dört oyuncu 2

Ankara Arena, Ankara
Referees: Fatih Söylemezoğlu, Engin Kennerman, Yener Yılmaz

== Final ==
9 February 2014
16:00

Boxscore

Pınar Karşıyaka	66–65	Anadolu Efes
Scoring by quarter: 20 - 16, 15 - 19, 17 - 18, 14 - 12
Pts: Dixon 19; Rebs: Dixon, Esteban Batista 5 Asts: Dixon 6		Pts: Planinić 17; Rebs: Gönlüm 12; Asts: Planinić 6

Ankara Arena, Ankara
Referees: Recep Ankaralı, Murat Biricik, Fatih Arslanoğlu
