= Nemanja Bjelica =

Serbian basketball player (born 1988)

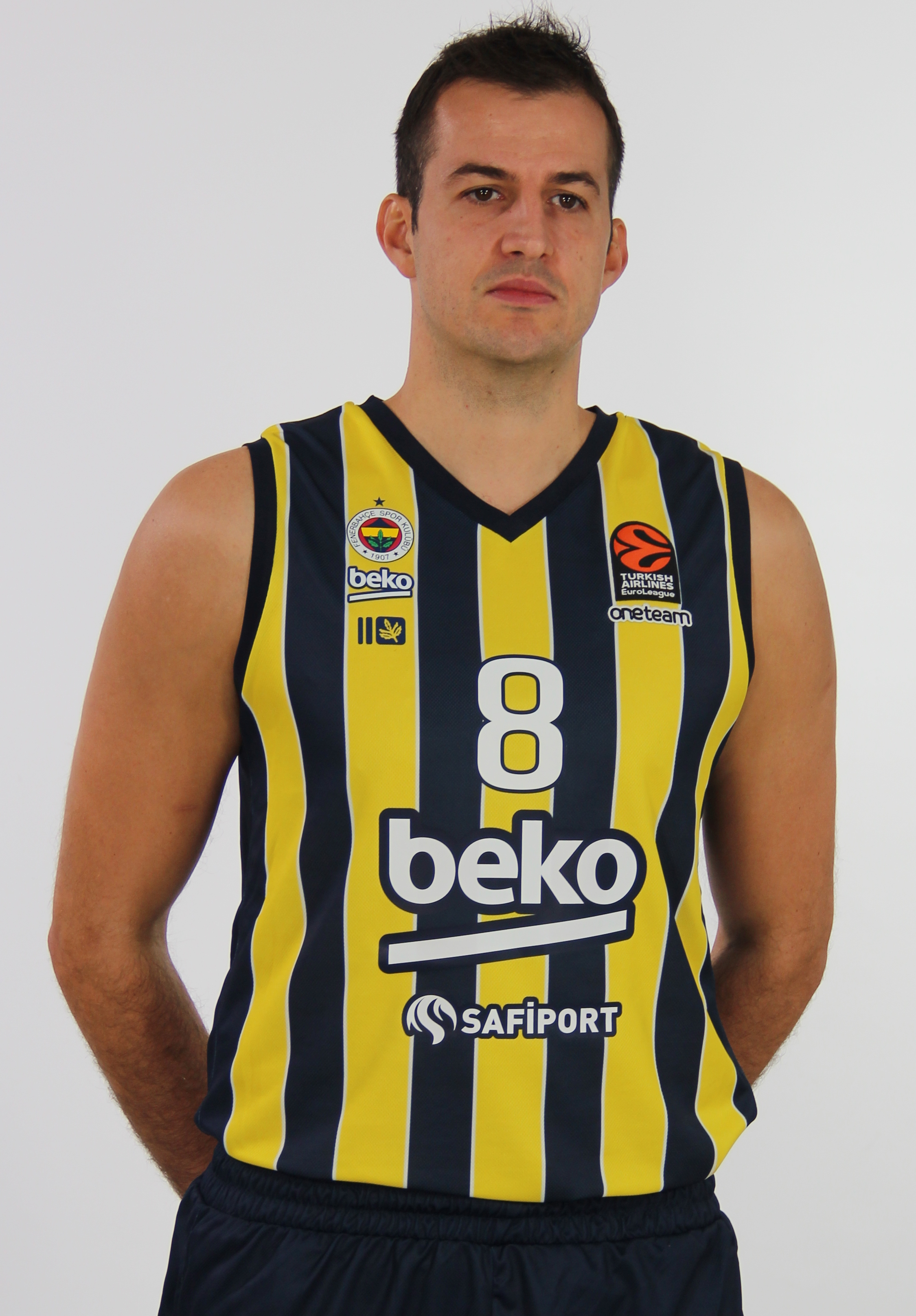
- Bjelica with Fenerbahçe in 2022

Personal information
- Born: 9 May 1988 (age 38) Belgrade, SR Serbia, SFR Yugoslavia
- Listed height: 6 ft 10 in (2.08 m)
- Listed weight: 234 lb (106 kg)

Career information
- NBA draft: 2010: 2nd round, 35th overall pick
- Drafted by: Washington Wizards
- Playing career: 2007–2023
- Position: Power forward / small forward
- Number: 44, 8, 88, 70

Career history
- 2007–2008: Traiskirchen Lions
- 2008–2010: Crvena zvezda
- 2010–2013: Baskonia
- 2013–2015: Fenerbahçe
- 2015–2018: Minnesota Timberwolves
- 2018–2021: Sacramento Kings
- 2021: Miami Heat
- 2021–2022: Golden State Warriors
- 2022–2023: Fenerbahçe

Career highlights
- NBA champion (2022); EuroLeague MVP (2015); All-EuroLeague First Team (2015); Turkish League champion (2014); Turkish Super Cup winner (2013); All-Serbian League First Team (2010); Serbian Player of the Year (2015)
- Stats at NBA.com
- Stats at Basketball Reference
Medals
Men's basketball
Representing Serbia
FIBA World Cup
Silver medal – second place	2014 Spain	Team
EuroBasket
Silver medal – second place	2009 Poland	Team
Universiade
Gold medal – first place	2009 Belgrade	Team

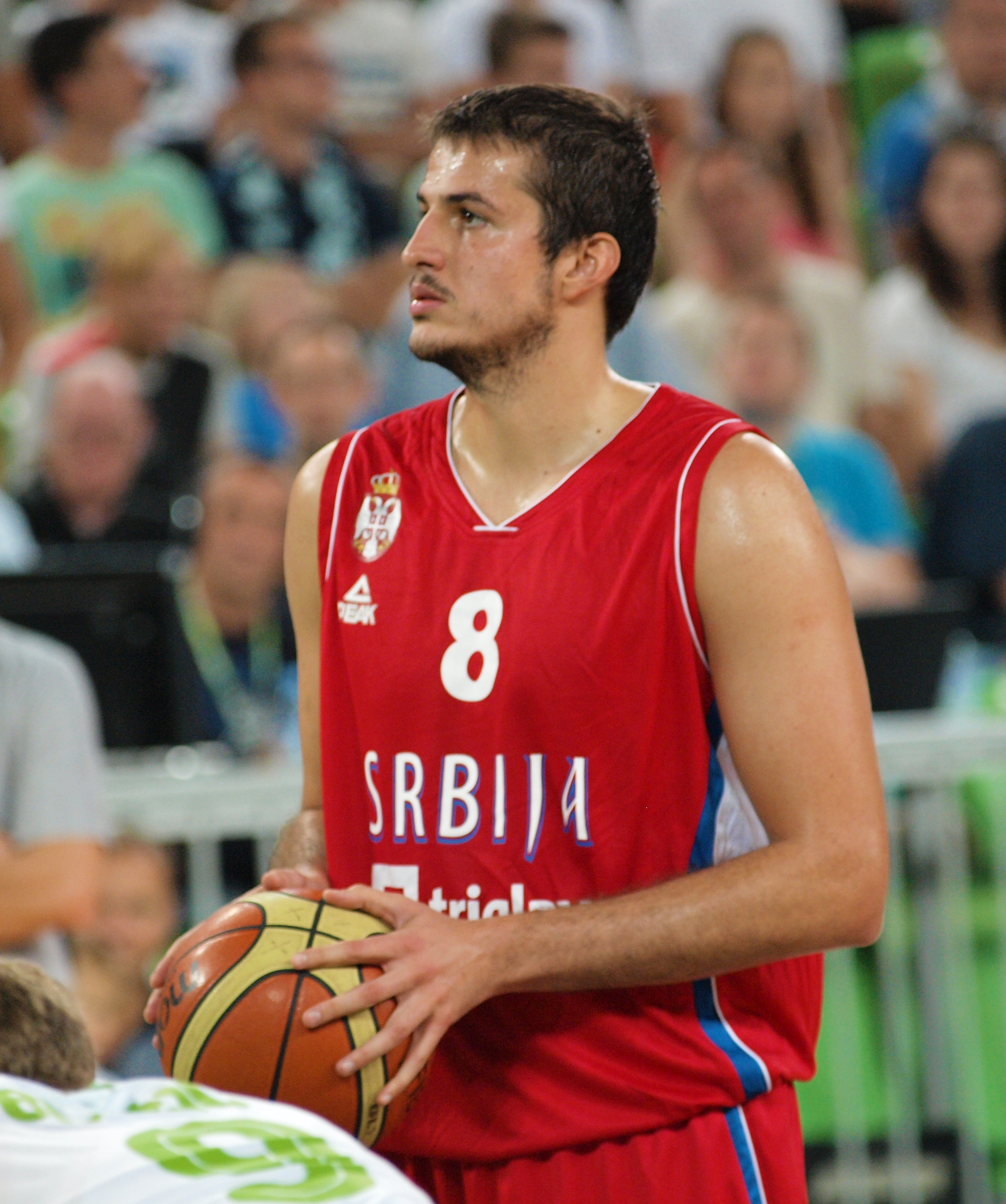
Bjelica with Serbia in August 2015.

Nemanja Bjelica (Serbian: Немања Бјелица, pronounced [němaɲa bjělitsa]; born 9 May 1988) is a Serbian executive and former professional basketball player who most recently became sporting director for Bahçeşehir Koleji of the Turkish Basketbol Süper Ligi (BSL). He represented the senior Serbian national team in international competition. Bjelica was an All-Euroleague First Team selection as well as the Euroleague MVP in 2015. Bjelica started his NBA career as a 27-year-old rookie when he signed in 2015 and played for the Minnesota Timberwolves for three seasons before signing with the Sacramento Kings in the 2018 offseason. In 2021, he was traded to the Miami Heat before signing with the Golden State Warriors during the offseason. With the Warriors, he won an NBA championship in 2022.

== Club career ==
=== Early career (2007–2010) ===
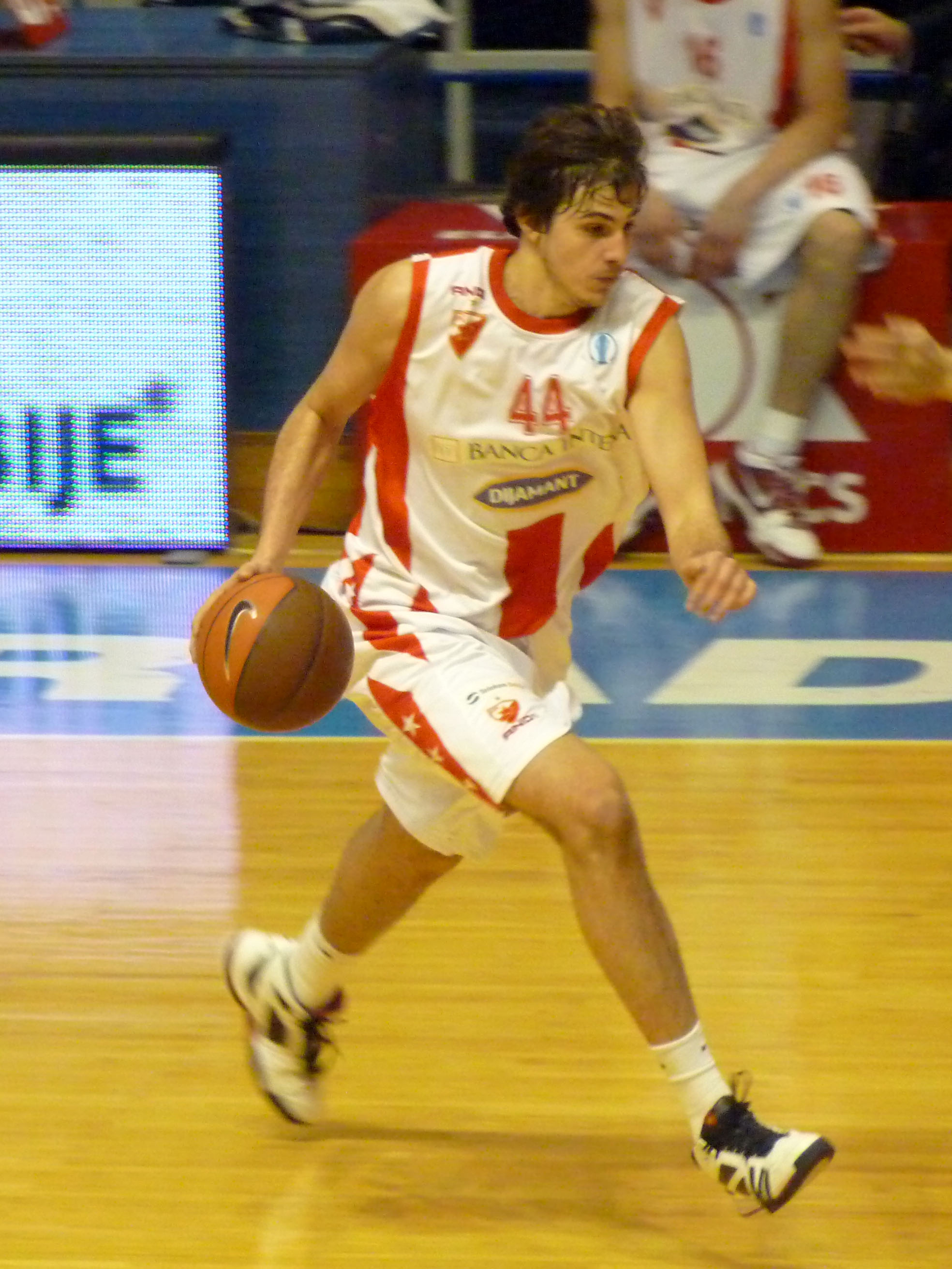
Bjelica playing for Crvena zvezda

Bjelica began playing basketball at Aca Janjić basketball school, before joining the youth system of KK Partizan. He began his professional career in the 2007–08 season with the Arkadia Traiskirchen Lions of the Austrian League, earning 8.5 points in 26 matches on average.

After one season abroad, Bjelica returned to the Serbian team Crvena zvezda and spent two successful seasons there under head coach Svetislav Pešić. During the 2008–09 season, he made breakthroughs, and earned a place in the first lineup. He was particularly noted for his performance during the EuroCup, for his outside shooting. Later in his career, Bjelica cited coach Pešić as one of the main reasons for his improvement as a player. Coach Pešić trusted Bjelica with the ball, and gave the 6"10 Bjelica a primary ball handler role on several occasions, which helped to develop Bjelica as a playmaker. Bjelica was drafted by the Washington Wizards with the 35th pick of the 2010 NBA draft. His draft rights were then traded to the Minnesota Timberwolves.

In August 2010, Bjelica signed a five-year contract with Spanish club Saski Baskonia.

=== Fenerbahçe (2013–2015) ===
On 22 July 2013, Bjelica signed a three-year contract with the Turkish club Fenerbahçe Ülker, which was led by one of Europe's great coaches, Željko Obradović. He cited Obradović as the main reason why he didn't go to the NBA instead. In the 2013–14 season, he immediately became one of the key players of Fenerbahçe Ülker, earning career highs of 10.4 points, 6.1 rebounds, 2.2 assists, and 1.6 steals per game over 24 EuroLeague games on average.

The following season, on 30 March 2015, Bjelica was named EuroLeague MVP of the Month for March, his first such monthly award in his career. Over four matches played in March, he earned 15 points, 9 rebounds, 3 assists, and 1 block per match on average. In May 2015, he was chosen to the All-EuroLeague First Team, for his performances over the season. Eventually, Bjelica was named EuroLeague MVP of the season. Fenerbahçe also advanced to the EuroLeague Final Four for the first time in the team's history. However, on 15 May, they lost in the semifinal against Real Madrid, by a score of 87–96. Eventually, Fenerbahçe finished fourth place after losing in the third-place play-off against CSKA Moscow, by a score of 80–86. Bjelica had his best season since he signed for the club, earning a career-high 12.1 points, 8.5 rebounds, 1.9 assists, and 1.3 steals on average per match. However, Fenerbahçe, finished the season without winning any trophy, after also losing in the semi-final series of the Turkish League championship, againstthe eventual league champions Pınar Karşıyaka. On 1 July, Bjelica ended his contract with Fenerbahçe to play in the NBA.

=== Minnesota Timberwolves (2015–2018) ===
On 14 July 2015, Bjelica signed with the Minnesota Timberwolves. He made his debut for the Timberwolves in their season opener on 28 October, recording eight points and five rebounds in a 112–111 victory against the Los Angeles Lakers. On 7 November, Bjelica had a season-best game with 17 points, 11 rebounds, five assists, one steal and one block against the Chicago Bulls. On 7 April 2016, he scored a season-high 18 points against the Sacramento Kings. Four days later, he recorded 11 points and a season-high 14 rebounds against the Houston Rockets.

On 13 November 2016, Bjelica made his first career start and scored a career-high 24 points in a 125–99 victory against the Los Angeles Lakers. On 16 March 2017, he was ruled out for the rest of the 2016–17 season due to a left foot injury. He underwent surgery five days later to repair a fractured navicular bone in his left foot. Bjelica missed 15 matches, spanning November and December of the 2017–18 season with a sprained left foot. On 8 March 2018, he scored a career-high 30 points on 11-for-16 shooting, including 6 for 9 from 3-point range, in a 117–109 loss to the Boston Celtics. He also had 12 rebounds to record his first 20–10 game in the NBA.

=== Sacramento Kings and Miami Heat (2018–2021) ===
On 21 July 2018, just days after backing out of a contract with the Philadelphia 76ers with the intention of returning to Europe, Bjelica signed a three-year, $20.5 million contract with the Sacramento Kings. On 25 March 2021, Bjelica was traded to the Miami Heat in exchange for Maurice Harkless and Chris Silva.

=== Golden State Warriors (2021–2022) ===
On 6 August 2021, Bjelica signed with the Golden State Warriors. He made his debut for the Warriors in their season opener on 19 October 2021, recording a double-double off the bench with 15 points and 11 rebounds in a 121–114 victory against the Los Angeles Lakers. He became the first player to post a double-double off the bench in his Warriors debut since Sam Williams (16 points, 12 rebounds) on 30 October 1981 at Denver. During the 2022 NBA Finals, Bjelica held Celtics star Jayson Tatum to 0-6 shooting and 4 turnovers en route to his first NBA championship. He became the fourth NBA player from Serbia who won the championship, joining Darko Miličić, Peja Stojaković, and Ognjen Kuzmić.

=== Later career and retirement (2022–2024) ===
On 9 August 2022, Bjelica re-signed for Fenerbahçe on a two-year contract, where he was named the EuroLeague MVP of the 2014-15 season. Upon missing much of the season due to a calf injury, Bjelica finally made his season debut on 3 March 2023. On 12 September 2023, he was released by Fenerbahçe. Hours after being released by Fenerbahçe, he returned to Serbia, signed a contract with Crvena zvezda. On 9 October 2023, after getting caught in a fight with Crvena zvezda head coach Duško Ivanović, Bjelica allegedly has parted ways with his hometown club. On 23 March 2024, Bjelica officially announced his retirement from professional basketball.

== National team career ==
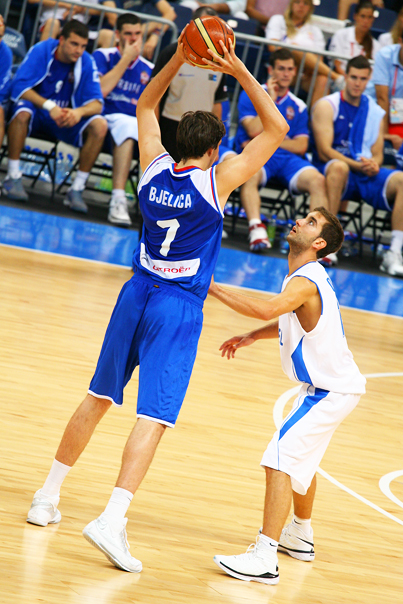
Bjelica taking on Israel as part of the gold medal-winning Serbian university team at the 2009 Summer Universiade in Belgrade.

Bjelica was a member of the Serbia national basketball team at the EuroBasket 2015. In Serbia's opening match, an 80–70 victory against Spain, he was Serbia's key player, posting 24 points, 10 rebounds, and 4 assists. The following day, he made a game-winning shot against Germany. In the last match of the group phase, he scored 19 points, grabbed 8 rebounds, and had four assists against Italy. Serbia dominated in the tournament's toughest group, Group B, with a 5–0 record, and then eliminated Finland and the Czech Republic in the round of 16 and quarterfinal games, respectively. However, they were stopped in the semifinal game by Lithuania, by a score of 67–64, and eventually lost against the host team, France, in the bronze-medal game, by a score of 81–68. Being one of the team's leaders, along with Miloš Teodosić and Miroslav Raduljica, Bjelica earned 13.9 points, 6.6 rebounds, and 2.7 assists per match on average, on 56.1% shooting from the field and 37.5% shooting from behind the three-point line.

At the 2019 FIBA Basketball World Cup, the national team of Serbia was dubbed as favorite to win the trophy, but was eventually upset in the quarterfinals by Argentina. With wins over the United States and Czech Republic, it finished in fifth place. Bjelica's statistics suggest he was the third-best player on the team behind Bogdanović and Jokić, earning 10.7 points, 4.7 rebounds and 2.7 assists over seven matches in average, while shooting 42.9% from the field.

== Post-playing career ==
In April 2024, Bahçeşehir Koleji appointed Bjelica as the club's new head of basketball operations for the 2024–25 season.

== Career statistics ==
Legend
GP	Games played	GS	Games started	MPG	Minutes per game
FG%	Field goal percentage	3P%	3-point field goal percentage	FT%	Free throw percentage
RPG	Rebounds per game	APG	Assists per game	SPG	Steals per game
BPG	Blocks per game	PPG	Points per game	**Bold**	Career high
†	Won an NBA championship

=== NBA ===
==== Regular season ====
Year	Team	GP	GS	MPG	FG%	3P%	FT%	RPG	APG	SPG	BPG	PPG
2015–16	Minnesota	60	0	17.9	.468	.384	.727	3.5	1.4	.4	.4	5.1
2016–17	Minnesota	65	1	18.3	.424	.316	.738	3.8	1.2	.6	.3	6.2
2017–18	Minnesota	67	21	20.5	.461	.415	.800	4.1	1.3	.7	.2	6.8
2018–19	Sacramento	**77**	**70**	23.2	.479	.401	.761	5.8	1.9	.7	**.7**	9.6
2019–20	Sacramento	72	67	**27.9**	**.481**	**.419**	**.821**	**6.4**	**2.8**	**.9**	.6	**11.5**
2020–21	Sacramento	26	1	16.9	.460	.293	.762	3.8	1.9	.3	.1	7.2
2020–21	Miami	11	2	14.2	.435	.370	.556	2.5	1.8	.6	.3	5.0
2021–22†	Golden State	71	0	16.1	.468	.362	.728	4.1	2.2	.6	.4	6.1
Career		449	162	20.4	.466	.384	.759	4.6	1.8	.6	.4	7.6

==== Playoffs ====
Year	Team	GP	GS	MPG	FG%	3P%	FT%	RPG	APG	SPG	BPG	PPG
2018	Minnesota	5	0	9.4	.438	**.517**	**.714**	**3.0**	.6	.6	.0	4.6
2021	Miami	2	0	**15.0**	.455	.500	.667	2.5	1.0	**1.0**	**.5**	**9.0**
2022†	Golden State	**15**	0	10.0	**.529**	.375	.571	2.1	**1.1**	.3	.1	2.9
Career		22	0	10.3	.492	.478	.650	2.3	1.0	.4	.1	3.8

=== EuroLeague ===
Year	Team	GP	GS	MPG	FG%	3P%	FT%	RPG	APG	SPG	BPG	PPG	PIR
2010–11	Baskonia	13	2	9.0	.250	.222	.500	1.7	.5	.2	—	1.2	0.5
2011–12	Baskonia	10	5	13.9	**.563**	**.474**	.750	2.1	1.0	**1.3**	.3	4.8	6.2
2012–13	Baskonia	26	9	23.1	.459	.310	.741	4.8	1.3	1.0	.3	9.9	10.1
2013–14	Fenerbahçe	24	18	25.1	.474	.416	**.846**	6.1	**2.2**	1.0	.4	10.4	13.6
2014–15	Fenerbahçe	**29**	**20**	**27.8**	.500	.351	.684	**8.5**	1.9	**1.3**	**.7**	**12.1**	**18.3**
2022–23	Fenerbahçe	7	0	8.4	.400	.167	.400	2.1	.9	.3	.1	2.7	3.1
Career		109	54	21.3	.474	.355	.713	5.3	1.5	1.0	.4	8.6	11.1

== Personal life ==
Bjelica was brought up in the New Belgrade Blocks. He married in June 2012 and has two children. Apart from his native Serbian, Bjelica speaks English fluently.

On 5 February 2024, Bjelica was threatened with scissors in Belgrade, Serbia. In the incident, the man told Bjelica: "I would take your family, your children, your wife, and you", and also threatened to stab him with the scissors.

== See also ==
- List of European basketball players in the United States
- List of KK Crvena zvezda players with 100 games played
- List of Serbian NBA players
