= Jawad Williams =

American basketball player (born 1983)

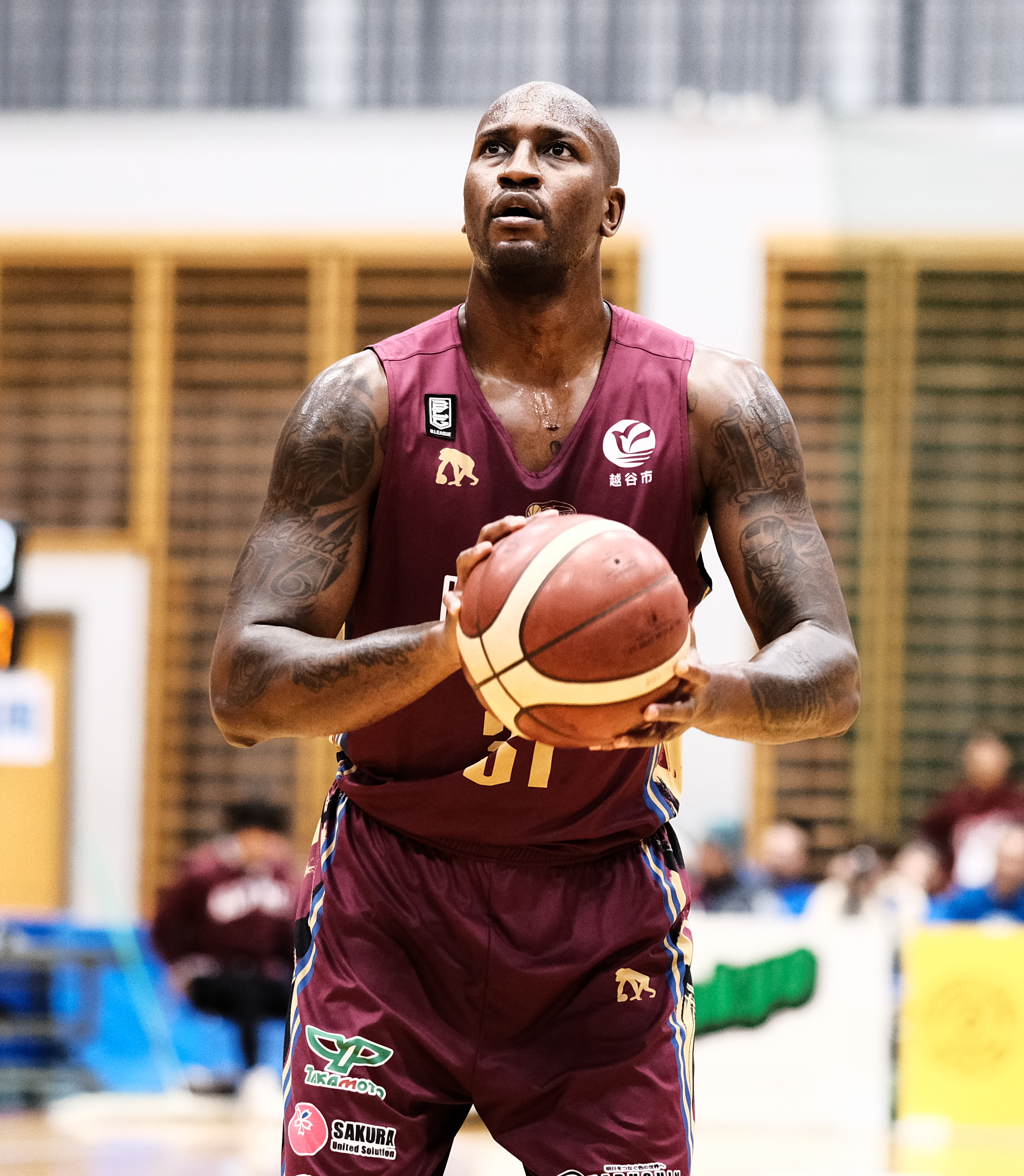
- Williams with the Koshigaya Alphas in 2019

Cleveland Cavaliers
- Title: Assistant coach
- League: NBA

Personal information
- Born: February 19, 1983 (age 43) Cleveland, Ohio, U.S.
- Listed height: 6 ft 9 in (2.06 m)
- Listed weight: 225 lb (102 kg)

Career information
- High school: St. Edward (Lakewood, Ohio)
- College: North Carolina (2001–2005)
- NBA draft: 2005: undrafted
- Playing career: 2005–2022
- Position: Small forward / power forward
- Number: 31
- Coaching career: 2022–present

Career history

Playing
- 2005–2006: Baloncesto Fuenlabrada
- 2006: Fayetteville Patriots
- 2006–2007: Anaheim Arsenal
- 2007–2008: Rera Kamuy Hokkaido
- 2008: Hapoel Galil Elyon
- 2008–2010: Cleveland Cavaliers
- 2009: Rio Grande Valley Vipers
- 2011: Hapoel Jerusalem
- 2011–2014: Paris-Levallois
- 2014: Pınar Karşıyaka
- 2014–2015: Royal Halı Gaziantep
- 2015: Indios de Mayagüez
- 2015–2016: Royal Halı Gaziantep
- 2016–2017: AEK Athens
- 2017: Pallacanestro Reggiana
- 2017–2019: Alvark Tokyo
- 2019: Koshigaya Alphas
- 2019–2020: Utsunomiya Brex
- 2020–2021: Levanga Hokkaido
- 2021–2022: Yamagata Wyverns

Coaching
- 2024–2025: Sacramento Kings (assistant)
- 2025–present: Cleveland Cavaliers (assistant)

Career highlights
- 2× B. League champion (2018, 2019); Turkish League All-Star (2015); Turkish Cup winner (2014); French Super Cup winner (2013); French Cup winner (2013); 2× French League All-Star (2012, 2013); JBL All-Star (2007); NBA D-League All-Star (2007); All-NBA D-League Second Team (2007); NCAA champion (2005); Third-team All-ACC (2005); ACC All-Freshman team (2002); Second-team Parade All-American (2001); McDonald's All-American (2001)
- Stats at NBA.com
- Stats at Basketball Reference

Jawad Hason Williams (born February 19, 1983) is an American former professional basketball player who currently serves as an assistant coach for the Cleveland Cavaliers of the National Basketball Association (NBA). He plays as a small forward-power forward. He played high school basketball at St. Edward High School of Lakewood, Ohio (suburban Cleveland) and college basketball for the University of North Carolina Tar Heels.

== Early life ==
While at St. Edward, Williams played limited time as a freshman on a team anchored by Sam Clancy, Jr. and Steve Logan that went on to win the OHSAA state title. During his later years in high school, he was named first team All-Ohio and named to numerous All-American teams. He was named AP and Gatorade Player of the Year for Ohio and played in the McDonald's All-American Game.

== Collegiate career ==
Williams played collegiate basketball under coaches Matt Doherty and Roy Williams at the University of North Carolina. He started as a senior for the Tar Heel team that won the 2005 NCAA tournament. Williams averaged 13.1 points, 4.0 rebounds, and 1.4 assists in his senior season. He graduated from UNC in 2005 with a B.A. in African-American studies.

== Professional career ==
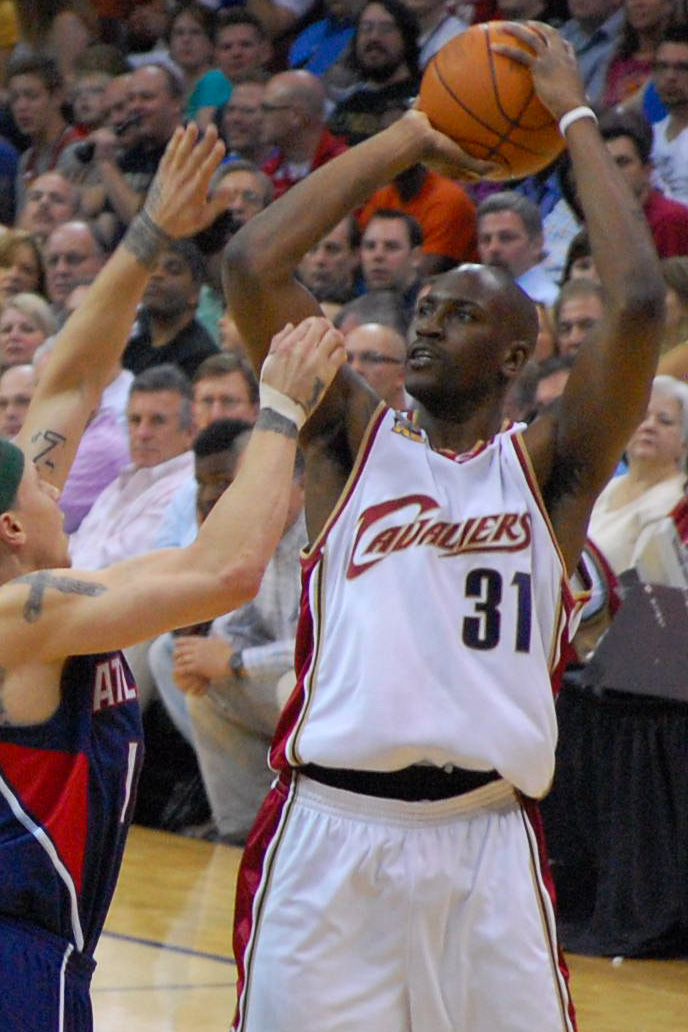
Williams during his tenure with the Cleveland Cavaliers

Williams was not selected in the 2005 NBA draft. However, he was signed as a free agent by the Los Angeles Clippers of the NBA during the 2006–07 season. He appeared in four preseason games for the Clippers, starting one, but did not make the final roster.

After playing in Spain, Japan and Israel, Williams joined the Cleveland Cavaliers' summer league team in July, 2008 and made the team's training camp roster. On October 23, the Cavs waived veteran guard Ronald Dupree, and Williams became a full-fledged member of an NBA team for the first time in his career. His contract was nonguaranteed until January 10, 2009, after which time the contract would have been guaranteed.

Williams played in his first regular season NBA game and scored his first points on December 12, 2008, against the Philadelphia 76ers. Williams became the sixth member of North Carolina's 2005 National Championship team to play in the NBA, joining Rashad McCants, Sean May, Raymond Felton, Marvin Williams, and David Noel.

Williams was waived by the Cavs on January 7, 2009. Five days after being released from the Cavs he re-signed with the team with a 10-day contract. He was released on February 2 after his second 10-day contract expired. He then joined the D-League with Rio Grande Valley Vipers on February 14. On April 8, he was re-signed to a contract for the rest of the season.

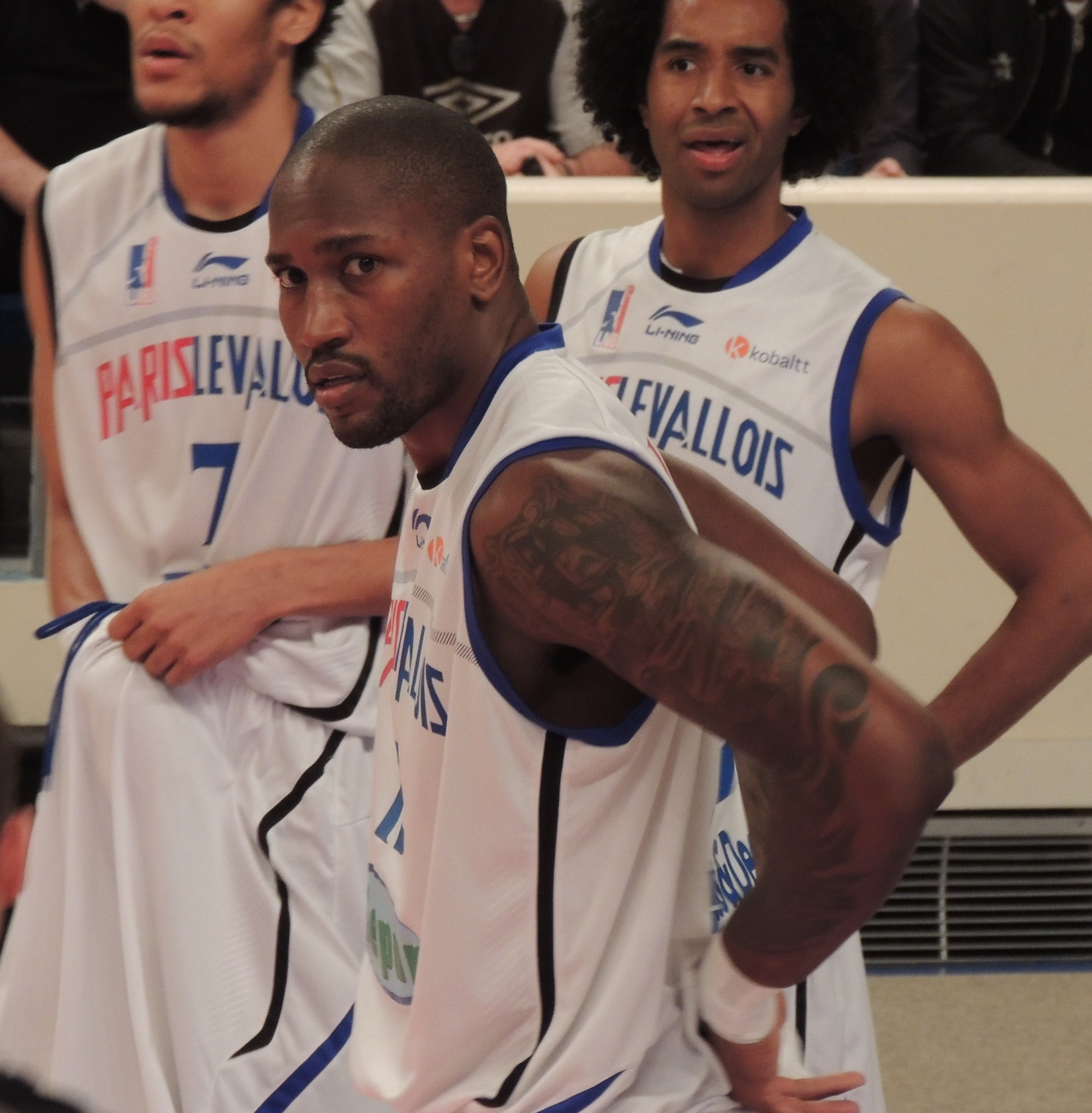
Williams with Paris-Levallois in 2012.

On February 9, 2010, Williams put up a career high in points with 17 to go along with 3 rebounds, 2 assists, and 1 steal in 28 minutes of play.

In the 2010 offseason, Jawad signed to play with the Cavs for the 2010–11 NBA season. On December 27, 2010, Williams was again waived by the Cavs.

In February 2011, he signed with Hapoel Jerusalem in Israel. For the 2011–12 season, Williams signed with Paris-Levallois Basket in France, rejoining college teammate David Noel. Williams stayed with Paris-Levallois for the 2012–13 season, but while Noel left Williams was joined by former college teammate Sean May. Paris-Levallois waived him on January 15, 2014. In February 2014, he signed with Pınar Karşıyaka of Turkey for the rest of the 2013–14 season.

On June 13, 2016, Williams signed with AEK Athens in Greece for the 2016–17 season. On February 12, 2017, he parted ways with AEK. The next day, he signed with Italian club Pallacanestro Reggiana for the rest of the season.

In July 2017, Williams signed with Alvark Tokyo of the Japanese B.League.

On June 1, 2022, he has announced his retirement from professional basketball.

Williams is now coaching in Japan for Nagasaki Velca. He serves as their first Assistant Coach and Director of Player Development.

== Coaching career ==
In July 2022, Williams joined Nagasaki Velca of the Japanese B. League, as an assistant coach and director of player development.

On September 9, 2024, Williams was hired as an assistant coach and director of player development for the Sacramento Kings of the National Basketball Association. On May 3, 2025, it was announced that Williams would be parting ways with the Kings.

On June 18, 2025 Williams joined the Cleveland Cavaliers as an assistant coach under head coach Kenny Atkinson.

== College statistics ==
Team	Years	PPG
North Carolina	2002–2005	13.1

== NBA career statistics ==
Legend
GP	Games played	GS	Games started	MPG	Minutes per game
FG%	Field goal percentage	3P%	3-point field goal percentage	FT%	Free throw percentage
RPG	Rebounds per game	APG	Assists per game	SPG	Steals per game
BPG	Blocks per game	PPG	Points per game	**Bold**	Career high

=== Regular season ===
(Correct as of 2010–11 season)

Year	Team	GP	GS	MPG	FG%	3P%	FT%	RPG	APG	SPG	BPG	PPG
2008–09	Cleveland	10	0	2.0	**.417**	**.333**	.000	.2	.0	.1	.0	1.2
2009–10	Cleveland	**54**	**6**	13.7	.393	.323	.711	1.5	.6	.2	**.1**	**4.1**
2010–11	Cleveland	26	1	**15.0**	.325	.289	**.750**	**1.8**	**.8**	**.3**	**.1**	4.0
Career		90	7	12.8	.369	.313	.719	1.5	.6	.2	.1	3.8

=== Playoffs ===
Year	Team	GP	GS	MPG	FG%	3P%	FT%	RPG	APG	SPG	BPG	PPG
2010	Cleveland	3	0	1.3	.000	.000	.000	.0	.0	.0	.0	0
Career		3	0	1.3	.000	.000	.000	.0	.0	.0	.0	0

== Career statistics ==
=== Domestic Leagues ===
==== Regular season ====
Legend
GP	Games played	MPG	Minutes per game	FG%	Field goal percentage
3P%	3-point field goal percentage	FT%	Free throw percentage	RPG	Rebounds per game
APG	Assists per game	SPG	Steals per game	BPG	Blocks per game
PPG	Points per game	**Bold**	Career high		Led the league

Note: Only games in the primary domestic competitions are included. Therefore, games in cup or European competitions are left out.

Year	Team	League	GP	MPG	FG%	3P%	FT%	RPG	APG	SPG	BPG	PPG
2007–08	Hokkaido	JBL	35	38.8	.434	.293	.799	7.1	1.9	0.6	0.5	24.7
2016–17	A.E.K.	GBL	25	22.4	.455	.442	.909	3.0	0.9	0.8	0.4	8.9
2017–18	A Tokyo	B.League	59	19.8	.436	.369	.816	3.5	1.1	0.5	0.3	9.0
