= İzzet Türkyılmaz =

Turkish basketball player

Izzet Türkyılmaz
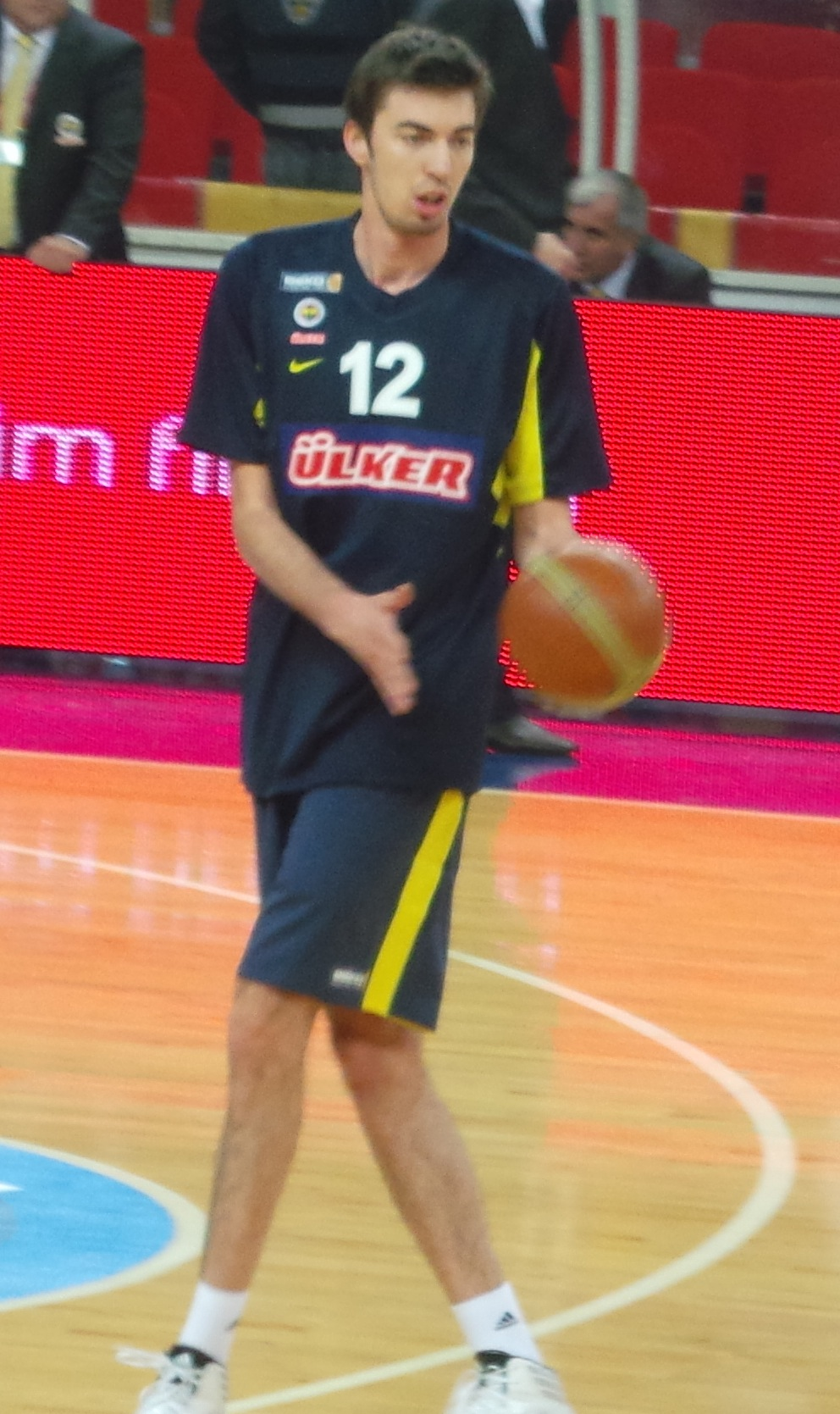
- Türkyılmaz with Fenerbahçe Ülker in 2013

No. 37 – Balıkesir BB
- Position: Power forward / center
- League: TBL

Personal information
- Born: 20 May 1990 (age 36) Ayvalık, Balıkesir, Turkey
- Listed height: 7 ft 0 in (2.13 m)
- Listed weight: 210 lb (95 kg)

Career information
- NBA draft: 2012: 2nd round, 50th overall pick
- Drafted by: Denver Nuggets
- Playing career: 2007–present

Career history
- 2007–2010: Genç Banvitliler
- 2010–2013: Banvit
- 2013–2014: Fenerbahçe Ülker
- 2014–2015: Le Mans Sarthe Basket
- 2015: GKK Šibenik
- 2015–2016: Galatasaray Odeabank
- 2016: →TED Ankara Kolejliler
- 2016–2017: GKK Šibenik
- 2017–2019: Selçuklu Belediyesi
- 2019–2020: Bursaspor
- 2020–2022: Balıkesir Büyükşehir Belediyespor
- 2022: Samsunspor
- 2023: Depomaxx Harem Spor
- 2023: Esenler Erokspor
- 2024: Semt77 Yalovaspor
- 2024–present: Balıkesir Büyükşehir Belediyespor

Career highlights
- Turkish League champion (2014); Turkish President's Cup winner (2013); TBL Slam Dunk Contest champion (2013)
- Stats at Basketball Reference
Medals
Men's basketball
Representing Turkey
Mediterranean Games
Gold medal – first place	2013 Mersin	Team

İzzet Türkyılmaz (born 20 May 1990) is a Turkish professional basketball player for Balıkesir Büyükşehir Belediyespor of the Türkiye Basketbol Ligi (TBL). Standing at 2.13 m (7 ft 0 in), he can play as a power forward or center.

== Professional career ==
On 2 September 2013 Türkyılmaz signed a three-year contract with option to extend for one season with Fenerbahçe Ülker.

On 26 November 2014 Türkyılmaz signed with Le Mans Sarthe Basket. On 2 January 2015 Türkyılmaz was not extended by Le Mans and became a free agent. During his stint with the French team he averaged 2.1 points and 1.7 rebounds per game. On 22 January he signed with Croatian club GKK Šibenik. He averaged 10 points, 5.6 rebounds and 1.8 blocks per game.

On 25 September 2015 Türkyılmaz signed with Galatasaray Odeabank, making his return to the Turkish League. On 29 January 2016 he was loaned to TED Ankara Kolejliler for the rest of the season.

On 14 August 2016 Türkyılmaz returned to GKK Šibenik.

Türkyılmaz signed with Bursaspor in 2019. On 14 November 2020, he signed with Balıkesir Büyükşehir Belediyespor of the Turkish Basketball First League.

On 12 January 2022, Türkyılmaz signed with Samsunspor of the TBL.

=== NBA ===
On 28 June 2012 Türkyılmaz was selected by the Denver Nuggets with the 50th overall pick in the 2012 NBA draft. He then joined the Nuggets for the 2012 NBA Summer League Team in Las Vegas, Nevada.

== Turkish national team ==
Türkyılmaz is also a member of the Turkish national team, playing the FIBA EuroBasket 2011 tournament, averaging 1.3 points and 2.3 rebounds per game.
