= Eskişehir Basket =

Turkish basketball team

- Founded: 2006; 20 years ago
- Dissolved: 2018; 8 years ago
- History: Olin Edirne (2006–2014); Eskişehir Basket (2014–2018)
- Arena: Anadolu Üniversitesi Sport Hall
- Capacity: 5,000
- Location: Eskişehir, Turkey
- Team colors: Red and Black
- Championships: 1 TBL Federation Cup
- Website: eskisehirbasket.com
Home	Away

Eskişehir Basket was a professional basketball team based in the city of Eskişehir in Turkey. Their home arena was the Anadolu Üniversitesi Sport Hall with a capacity of 5,000 seats. Founded in 2006, the club played in the highest tier Basketbol Süper Ligi for seven seasons. It also played in Europe for one season, in the 2011–12 EuroChallenge. In July 2018, the club withdrew from the BSL, ceasing its basketball activities.

== History ==
The team was founded in 2006 and played first 2 seasons in Regional League and promoted to Second League in 2008. Olin Gençlik finished Turkish Basketball League (TBL) as 5th in 2008-2009 season. Olin Gençlik finally promoted to Turkish Basketball League in 2009-10 season finished play-offs as 2nd behind of Medical Park Trabzonspor.

Olin Gençlik renamed its name as Olin Edirne Basket before start of 2010-11 season. It gives very sound away victories against Galatasaray (70-63) and Beşiktaş (93-83) in debut season. Olin Edirne finished Turkish Basketball League as 7th in 2010-2011 season and qualify for play Eurochallenge.

Olin Edirne Basket have not got a good season in 2012-13. They played Eurochallenge and Olin eliminated at the Group Stages.

Olin Edirne finished the 2012–13 season on the 14th spot and managed to stay in the league.

Olin Edirne started the 2013–14 season with new coach Cem Akdağ. The team has a record of 4 wins and 6 losses and is ranked at the 10th spot after 10 games in the competition. The team leader is Darius Washington, who is also the top scorer of the Turkish League. Greek forward Christos Tapoutos and American Center Torin Francis are having both an excellent season with double figures in points per game.

Olin Edirne moved to Eskişehir in 2014, because Olin does not support to Edirne Basket anymore. The team opens new season in Eskişehir as Eskişehir Basket. In 2014–15 the team was relegated to the Turkish Basketball League (TBL).

In the 2017–18 season, Eskişehir finished seventh in the BSL, thus qualifying for the next season's Basketball Champions League. On 13 July 2018, Eskişehir withdrew from the upcoming BSL and Basketball Champions League seasons.

== Season by season ==
Season	Tier	League	Pos.	Turkish Cup	European competitions	
2006–07	3	EBBL	3rd			
2007–08	3	EBBL	1st			
2008–09	2	TBL	5th			
2009–10	2	TBL	2nd			
2010–11	1	BSL	7th	Quarterfinalist		
2011–12	1	BSL	14th	Group stage	3 EuroChallenge	RS
2012–13	1	BSL	14th	Group stage		
2013–14	1	BSL	14th	Group stage		
2014–15	1	BSL	15th	Group stage		
2015–16	2	TBL	15th			
2016–17	2	TBL	2nd			
2017–18	1	BSL	7th			

== Honors ==
- Mavroskoufia Basketball Tournament: 2011

== Players ==
=== Notable players ===
Note: Flags indicate national team eligibility at FIBA-sanctioned events. Players may hold other non-FIBA nationalities not displayed.

Criteria

To appear in this section a player must have either:

- Set a club record or won an individual award while at the club
- Played at least one official international match for their national team at any time
- Played at least one official NBA match at any time.

- (Turkey) Bekir Yarangüme
- (Turkey) Can Akın
- (Turkey) Mehmet Yağmur
- (Belarus) Artsiom Parakhouski
- (Bulgaria) Filip Videnov
- (Canada) Jordan Bachynski
- (Czech Republic) David Jelínek
- (Greece) Christos Tapoutos
- (Lithuania) Renaldas Seibutis
- (Lithuania) Vidas Ginevičius
- (North Macedonia) Predrag Samardžiski
- (Serbia) Vladimir Štimac
- (United States) Chris Wright
- (North Macedonia) Darius Washington, Jr.
- (Ukraine) Jerome Randle
- (United States) Matt Walsh
- (United States) Seth Doliboa
- (United States) Torin Francis
