= Emir Preldžić =

Turkish basketball player (born 1987)

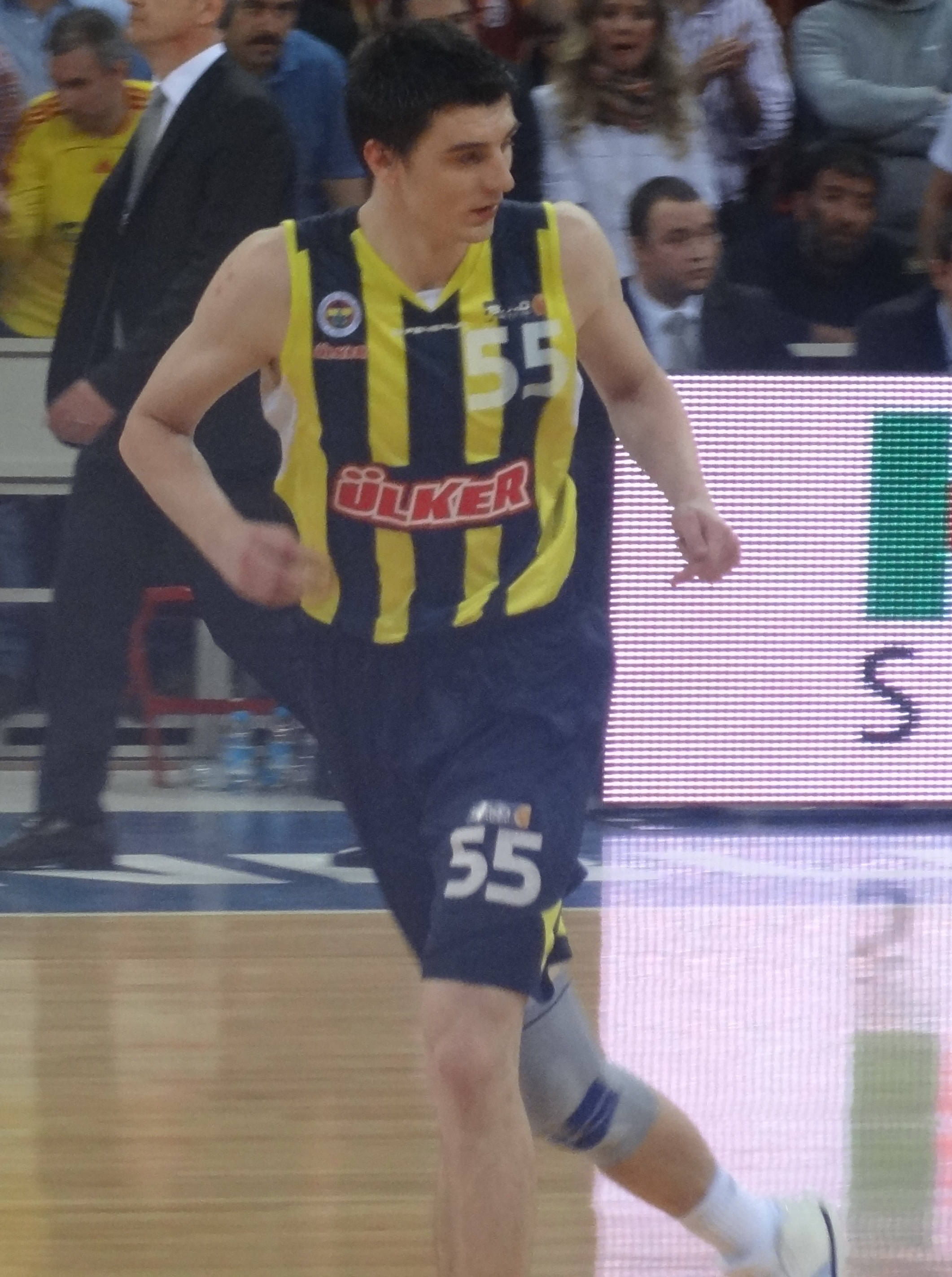
- Preldžić with Fenerbahçe

No. 55 – Orlovik Žepče
- Position: Forward
- League: Basketball Championship of Bosnia and Herzegovina

Personal information
- Born: 6 September 1987 (age 39) Zenica, SR Bosnia and Herzegovina; SFR Yugoslavia
- Listed height: 6 ft 9 in (2.06 m)
- Listed weight: 220 lb (100 kg)

Career information
- NBA draft: 2009: 2nd round, 57th overall pick
- Drafted by: Phoenix Suns
- Playing career: 2003–present

Career history
- 2003–2004: Čelik Zenica
- 2004–2005: Triglav Kranj
- 2005–2007: Geoplin Slovan
- 2007–2015: Fenerbahçe Ülker
- 2015–2016: Darüşşafaka
- 2016–2018: Galatasaray
- 2018–2019: Bahçeşehir
- 2019–present: KK Orlovik Žepče

Career highlights
- 4× Turkish League champion (2008, 2010, 2011, 2014); 3× Turkish Cup winner (2010, 2011, 2013); Turkish President's Cup winner (2013); Turkish Cup MVP (2011)
- Stats at Basketball Reference
Medals
Men's basketball
Representing Slovenia
European U-20 Championship
Bronze medal – third place	2006 Turkey

Emir Preldžić (born 6 September 1987) is a Bosnian-Turkish professional basketball player for KK Orlovik Žepče of the Basketball Championship of Bosnia and Herzegovina. He also represented the Turkish national basketball team. He is 6 ft 9 in (2.06 m) tall and he mainly plays the small forward position, but he also has the ability to play as a power forward, shooting guard and point guard.

== Professional career ==
=== Early years ===
Preldžić began his career playing with Čelik Zenica youth teams in Bosnia and Herzegovina. He made his pro debut with Čelik Zenica in the Bosnia and Herzegovina League during the 2003–04 season. In the 2004–05 season he played with Triglav Kranj. He then moved to the Adriatic League club Geoplin Slovan for the 2005–06 season.

=== Fenerbahçe Ülker ===
In 2007, he signed a four-year contract with the Turkish EuroLeague team Fenerbahçe Ülker.

On 27 January 2011, in the EuroLeague match against Power Electronics Valencia, he double blocked Rafa Martínez in only one second. He played with 10 points, 2 rebounds, 5 assists and 2 blocks performance in a victory against Power Electronics Valencia.

On 13 February 2011, in Turkish Cup final match against Beşiktaş Cola Turka, he played with 35 points, 3 rebounds and 4 assists as MVP performance.

On 28 February 2011, the official page of the team declared that he had signed a three-year contract with the team.

On 20 March 2011, he played with 10 points, 15 rebounds and 10 assist performance against Olin Edirne which he did his first triple double in the team. This triple double is second in Turkish Basketball League history after Mark Dickel played with 16 points, 13 rebounds and 11 assists performance against Galatasaray in the 2002–03 season.

On 11 October 2012, his stat line was 20 points, 4 rebounds, 4 assists and 2 steals in a performance against BC Khimki in 2012–13 Euroleague first week match which made him Euroleague Weekly MVP by 31 ratings.

=== Darüşşafaka ===
On 25 August 2015 Preldžić signed with Darüşşafaka.

=== Galatasaray ===
On 9 September 2016 Preldžić signed a two-year deal with Galatasaray.

=== NBA rights ===
In the 2009 NBA draft, Preldžić was selected by the Phoenix Suns in the second round, with the 57th draft pick. His draft rights were then traded to the Cleveland Cavaliers, and later to the Washington Wizards in a February 2010 trade that sent Antawn Jamison from Washington to Cleveland. On 17 July 2014 the Dallas Mavericks acquired Preldžić's rights from the Wizards in a sign-and-trade deal for DeJuan Blair. On 8 July 2016 the rights to Preldžić, along with Jeremy Evans, were traded to the Indiana Pacers in exchange for the rights to Stanko Barać. On 14 July 2017 the rights to Preldžić were traded to the Toronto Raptors in exchange for Cory Joseph. On 6 February 2019 his rights were again traded, this time to the Philadelphia 76ers. On 25 March 2021 his rights were traded to the New York Knicks.

== Career statistics ==
Legend
GP	Games played	GS	Games started	MPG	Minutes per game
FG%	Field-goal percentage	3P%	3-point field-goal percentage	FT%	Free-throw percentage
RPG	Rebounds per game	APG	Assists per game	SPG	Steals per game
BPG	Blocks per game	PPG	Points per game	PIR	Performance index rating
**Bold**	Career high

=== Euroleague ===
Year	Team	GP	GS	MPG	FG%	3P%	FT%	RPG	APG	SPG	BPG	PPG	PIR
2007–08	Fenerbahçe	20	10	18.1	.376	.255	.500	2.3	1.1	.5	.1	4.8	3.5
2008–09	Fenerbahçe	16	7	22.6	.358	.245	**.806**	3.8	2.5	**1.1**	**.3**	7.3	7.4
2009–10	Fenerbahçe	10	1	25.2	.362	.188	.667	4.1	2.3	.9	.1	6.8	7.7
2010–11	Fenerbahçe	16	1	16.3	.494	**.438**	.679	2.4	2.3	.3	**.3**	7.3	8.1
2011–12	Fenerbahçe	16	4	21.5	.310	.250	.750	3.3	3.1	.6	.1	6.7	7.5
2012–13	Fenerbahçe	22	4	22.5	**.504**	.333	.704	2.1	3.5	.6	.1	8.1	10.5
2013–14	Fenerbahçe	23	**18**	**29.0**	.452	.317	.696	**4.7**	**4.7**	**1.1**	**.3**	**10.2**	**15.5**
2014–15	Fenerbahçe	**29**	7	22.0	.447	.345	.742	2.7	3.1	.9	.1	5.8	8.2
2015–16	Darüşşafaka	20	5	18.1	.345	.273	.579	3.4	2.9	.5	.2	4.6	7.5
2016–17	Galatasaray	18	3	16.5	.395	.385	.684	2.4	2.3	1.0	.0	5.1	7.9
Career		152	57	21.7	.413	.294	.690	3.1	2.9	.7	.2	6.8	8.6

== National team career ==
=== Slovenian national team ===
Preldžić was a member of the Slovenian national basketball team and he competed for Slovenia at the 2008 Olympic Qualifying Tournament, since he acquired Slovenian citizenship as a member of the Bosniak community in Slovenia.

=== Turkish national team ===
Through 2011, the Bosnian media speculated that Preldžić may play for the Bosnian national basketball team because of his birthplace Zenica, city in modern Bosnia and Herzegovina. However, on 6 July 2011 the Turkish Basketball Federation announced Preldžić's name in its official nominated squad for the EuroBasket 2011 held in Lithuania. Preldžić decided to change national team using the FIBA regulation on Eligibility and National Status of Players (Chapter I.22).

He was later selected to the Turkish national team's EuroBasket 2011 roster by head coach Orhun Ene. On 5 September 2011 in EuroBasket 2011 group match against Spain, he played with 18 points, 5 rebounds and 1 steal performance in a victory. Over the tournament, he averaged 10.8 points, 3.4 rebounds and 2.3 assists per game.

He was once again called to play for the national team at the EuroBasket 2013 in Slovenia. He averaged 8.8 points, and 3.8 rebounds and assists over 5 tournament games.
