= Turkish Basketball Cup =

Turkish Basketball Cup Türkiye Basketbol Kupası
- Current season, competition or edition: 2026 Turkish Basketball Cup
- Founded: 1967; 59 years ago
- No. of teams: 8
- Country: Turkey
- Confederation: FIBA Europe
- Most recent champion: Fenerbahçe Beko (10th title)
- Most titles: Anadolu Efes (12 titles)
- Broadcaster: a Spor
- Related competitions: Basketball Super League; Turkish Presidential Cup
- Website: tbf.org.tr

The Turkish Basketball Cup (Turkish: Basketbol Erkekler Türkiye Kupası), is the annual men's professional basketball cup tournament in Turkey. It is held and organised by the Turkish Basketball Federation since 1967. The tournament was on hiatus from 1973 to 1991.

Fenerbahçe are the current title holders, having won their 10th title in 2026.

== Finals ==
Season	Winners	Score	Runners-up	MVP
1966–67	Fenerbahçe	84–67 / 65–76	Muhafızgücü	—N/a
1967–68	Altınordu	71–56 / 63–67	Muhafızgücü	—N/a
1968–69	İTÜ	64–56	Galatasaray	—N/a
1969–70	Galatasaray	86–83	İTÜ	—N/a
1970–71	İTÜ	74–69	Beşiktaş	—N/a
1971–72	Galatasaray	70–69	İTÜ	—N/a
1972–73	TED Ankara Kolejliler	64–68 / 68–56	Beşiktaş	—N/a
1974–91	Not held			—N/a
1992	Paşabahçe	79–71	Nasaş	—N/a
1993	Tofaş	90–64	Nasaş	—N/a
1993–94	Efes Pilsen	81–76	Fenerbahçe	—N/a
1994–95	Galatasaray	66–54	Ortaköy	—N/a
1995–96	Efes Pilsen	89–63	Türk Telekom	—N/a
1996–97	Efes Pilsen	84–71	Fenerbahçe	—N/a
1997–98	Efes Pilsen	71–67	Türk Telekom	—N/a
1998–99	Tofaş	77–75	Fenerbahçe	—N/a
1999–00	Tofaş	72–54	Ülker	—N/a
2000–01	Efes Pilsen	85–78	Türk Telekom	—N/a
2001–02	Efes Pilsen	78–74	Darüşşafaka	—N/a
2002–03	Ülker	79–63	Türk Telekom	—N/a
2003–04	Ülker	84–74	Efes Pilsen	—N/a
2004–05	Ülker	73–41	Pınar Karşıyaka	—N/a
2005–06	Efes Pilsen	74–68	Ülker	—N/a
2006–07	Efes Pilsen	73–59	Banvit	—N/a
2007–08	Türk Telekom	80–61	Oyak Renault	—N/a
2008–09	Efes Pilsen	79–70	Erdemirspor	—N/a
2009–10	Fenerbahçe Ülker	72–68	Mersin B.B.	
2010–11	Fenerbahçe Ülker	81–72	Beşiktaş Cola Turka	(Turkey) Emir Preldžič
2011–12	Beşiktaş Milangaz	78–74	Banvit	(Turkey) Serhat Çetin
2012–13	Fenerbahçe Ülker	63–57	Galatasaray Medical Park	(Australia) David Andersen
2013–14	Pınar Karşıyaka	66–65	Anadolu Efes	(Turkey) Bobby Dixon
2014–15	Anadolu Efes	70–60	Fenerbahçe Ülker	(France) Thomas Heurtel
2016	Fenerbahçe	67–65	Darüşşafaka Doğuş	(Serbia) Bogdan Bogdanović
2017	Banvit	75–66	Anadolu Efes	(North Macedonia) Jordan Theodore
2018	Anadolu Efes	78–61	Tofaş	(Croatia) Krunoslav Simon
2019	Fenerbahçe Beko	80–70	Anadolu Efes	(Italy) Luigi Datome
2020	Fenerbahçe Beko	74–71	Darüşşafaka	(Italy) Luigi Datome
2021	Cancelled due to the COVID-19 pandemic.			
2022	Anadolu Efes	86–72	Fenerbahçe Beko	(Germany) Tibor Pleiß
2023	Cancelled after the 2023 Turkey–Syria earthquake.			
2024	Fenerbahçe Beko	80–67	Anadolu Efes	(Greece) Nick Calathes
2025	Fenerbahçe Beko	104–81	Beşiktaş Fibabanka	(United States) Nigel Hayes-Davis
2026	Fenerbahçe Beko	91–74	Beşiktaş Gain	(Turkey) Tarik Biberović

Note: Flags indicate national team eligibility at FIBA-sanctioned events. Players may hold other non-FIBA nationalities not displayed.

== Performance by club ==
Clubs in bold currently play in the top division.

Club	Winners	Runners-up	Years won
**Anadolu Efes**	12	5	1994, 1996, 1997, 1998, 2001, 2002, 2006, 2007, 2009, 2015, 2018, 2022
**Fenerbahçe**	10	5	1967, 2010, 2011, 2013, 2016, 2019, 2020, 2024, 2025, 2026
**Galatasaray**	3	2	1970, 1972, 1995
Ülker	3	2	2003, 2004, 2005
**Tofaş**	3	1	1993, 1999, 2000
İTÜ	2	1	1969, 1971
**Beşiktaş**	1	5	2012
**Türk Telekom**	1	4	2008
Bandırma Basketbol	1	2	2017
**Karşıyaka**	1	1	2014
Altınordu	1	–	1968
TED Ankara Kolejliler	1	–	1973
Paşabahçe	1	–	1992
Darüşşafaka	–	3	
Muhafızgücü	–	2	
Nasaş	–	2	
Erdemirspor	–	1	
Mersin BB	–	1	
Ortaköy	–	1	
Oyak Renault	–	1	

== See also ==
- **Men's**
- Turkish Men's Basketball League
- Turkish Men's Basketball Cup
- Turkish Men's Basketball Presidential Cup
- **Women's**
- Turkish Women's Basketball League
- Turkish Women's Basketball Cup
- Turkish Women's Basketball Presidential Cup

== Sources ==
- Durupınar, Mehmet. Türk Basketbolunun 100 yıllık tarihi, (2009). Efes Pazarlama ve Dağıtım Ticaret A.Ş. ISBN 978-975-00995-1-9
