= Turkish Basketball Federation =

Turkey's national federation for basketball

- Sport: Basketball
- Jurisdiction: National
- Founded: 1959
- Affiliation: FIBA
- Regional affiliation: Europe
- Headquarters: 2022–2024 Sinan Erdem Dome, Istanbul; 2024– Basketball Development Center, Istanbul
- Location: Turkey
- President: Hidayet Türkoğlu

Official website
- www.tbf.org.tr

The Turkish Basketball Federation (Turkish: Türkiye Basketbol Federasyonu, TBF) is the national federation for basketball in Turkey. It is headquartered in Istanbul.

They organize the Basketball Super League, Women's Basketball Super League the Turkish Basketball Cup and the Turkish Basketball Presidential Cup. It is also responsible for appointing the management of the men's, women's and youth national basketball teams.

In October 2016, Hidayet Türkoğlu was elected as its president.

The Federation moved its headquarters with all its offices from Sinan Erdem Dome, where it had been using from January 2022 on, to the newly-built Basketbol Gelişim Merkezi (English: Basketball Development Center) on 9 September 2024.

== See also ==
- List of naturalized sportspeople of Turkey national basketball teams
