= 2012–13 Fenerbahçe S.K. (basketball) season =

Fenerbahçe Ülker
2012–13 season
- Chairman: Aziz Yıldırım
- Head coach: Simone Pianigiani (until 24 February 2013); Ertuğrul Erdoğan (from 24 February 2013)
- Arena: Ülker Sports Arena
- Turkish Basketball League: 4th seed
- Playoffs: Quarterfinals
- Euroleague: Top 16
- Turkish Cup: Winners

The 2012–13 season was Fenerbahçe's 99th season in the existence of the club. The team played in the Turkish Basketball League and in the Euroleague.

== Players ==
=== Squad information ===
Fenerbahçe Ülker roster
Players
Coaches

Pos.	No.	Nat.	Name	Ht.	Wt.	Age
PG	4	(North Macedonia) (United States)	McCalebb, Bo	1.83 m (6 ft 0 in)	83 kg (183 lb)	28 – 4 May 1985
SG	7	(Turkey)	Onan, Ömer (C)	1.94 m (6 ft 4 in)	93 kg (205 lb)	35 – 4 February 1978
PG	8	(Turkey)	Uğurlu, Berk	1.90 m (6 ft 3 in)	80 kg (176 lb)	17 – 27 April 1996
PG	9	(Turkey)	Ermiş, Barış	1.94 m (6 ft 4 in)	90 kg (198 lb)	28 – 3 January 1985
SF	10	(Central African Republic)	Sato, Romain	1.96 m (6 ft 5 in)	100 kg (220 lb)	32 – 2 March 1981
SG	11	(Serbia)	Tripković, Uroš	1.97 m (6 ft 6 in)	84 kg (185 lb)	26 – 11 September 1986
C	13	(Australia)	Andersen, David	2.11 m (6 ft 11 in)	113 kg (249 lb)	32 – 23 June 1980
C	14	(Turkey)	Peker, Kaya	2.07 m (6 ft 9 in)	110 kg (243 lb)	32 – 2 August 1980
C	21	(Turkey)	Savaş, Oğuz	2.13 m (7 ft 0 in)	120 kg (265 lb)	25 – 13 July 1987
PF	22	(Turkey)	Birsen, Metecan	2.06 m (6 ft 9 in)	100 kg (220 lb)	18 – 6 April 1995
PF	24	(United States)	Batiste, Mike	2.04 m (6 ft 8 in)	110 kg (243 lb)	35 – 21 November 1977
PF	41	(Turkey)	Karaman, İlkan	2.05 m (6 ft 9 in)	110 kg (243 lb)	23 – 13 May 1990
SF	44	(Croatia)	Bogdanović, Bojan	2.00 m (6 ft 7 in)	100 kg (220 lb)	24 – 18 April 1989
G/F	55	(Turkey) (Bosnia and Herzegovina)	Preldžič, Emir	2.06 m (6 ft 9 in)	100 kg (220 lb)	25 – 6 September 1987

Head coach

- (Turkey) Ertuğrul Erdoğan

Team manager

- (Bosnia and Herzegovina) Damir Mršić

Legend

- (C) Team captain
- Injured

- Roster

== Overview ==
Competition	First match	Last match	Starting round	Final position	Record							
Competition	First match	Last match	Starting round	Final position	Pld	W	D	L	PF	PA	PD	Win %
Turkish Basketball League	14 October 2012	21 May 2013	Round 1	Quarterfinals	32	24	0	8	2,633	2,349	+284	75.00
Euroleague	11 October 2012	31 January 2013	Round 1	Top 16	24	7	0	17	1,782	1,984	−202	29.17
Turkish Cup	2 October 2012	10 February 2013	Group stage	Winners	6	5	0	1	458	395	+63	83.33
Total					62	36	0	26	4,873	4,728	+145	58.06

Source: Competitions

=== Turkish Basketball League ===
==== League table ====
Pos	Team	Pld	W	L	PF	PA	PD	Pts	Qualification or relegation
1	Galatasaray Medical Park	30	25	5	2503	2197	+306	55	Qualification to playoffs
2	Banvit	30	25	5	2434	2174	+260	55	Qualification to playoffs
3	Anadolu Efes	30	24	6	2479	2142	+337	54	Qualification to playoffs
4	Beşiktaş Milangaz	30	22	8	2570	2321	+249	52	Qualification to playoffs
5	Fenerbahçe Ülker	30	21	9	2406	2228	+178	51	Qualification to playoffs
6	Pınar Karşıyaka	30	19	11	2529	2378	+151	49	Qualification to playoffs
7	Aliağa Petkim	30	14	16	2308	2351	−43	44	Qualification to playoffs
8	Tofaş	30	14	16	2323	2350	−27	44	Qualification to playoffs
9	Türk Telekom	30	13	17	2421	2464	−43	43	
10	Mersin BB	30	12	18	2424	2519	−95	42	
11	Erdemirspor	30	12	18	2162	2276	−114	42	
12	Hacettepe Üniversitesi	30	11	19	2145	2386	−241	41	
13	Antalya BB	30	10	20	2473	2595	−122	40	
14	Olin Edirne	30	8	22	2115	2290	−175	38	
15	Trabzonspor (R)	30	6	24	2216	2437	−221	36	Relegation to TBL
16	Bandırma Kırmızı (R)	30	4	26	2016	2416	−400	34	Relegation to TBL

Source: TBL
(R) Relegated

=== Euroleague ===
==== Group A regular season ====
===== Standing =====
Pos	Team	Pld	W	L	PF	PA	PD	Qualification
1	(Spain) Real Madrid	10	7	3	832	738	+94	Advance to Top 16
2	(Russia) Khimki	10	6	4	753	754	−1	Advance to Top 16
3	(Greece) Panathinaikos	10	6	4	748	722	+26	Advance to Top 16
4	(Turkey) Fenerbahçe Ülker	10	5	5	727	738	−11	Advance to Top 16
5	(Slovenia) Union Olimpija	10	3	7	722	808	−86	
6	(Italy) Mapooro Cantù	10	3	7	708	730	−22	

Source: Euroleague

===== Fixtures/results =====
All times given below are in Central European Time.

11 October 2012
20:45

Report

Fenerbahçe Ülker (Turkey)	92–80	(Russia) BC Khimki
Scoring by quarter: 25–25, 21–11, 16–18, 30–26
Pts: Preldžić 20; Rebs: Batiste 5 Asts: McCalebb 4		Pts: Planinić 17; Rebs: Planinić 6 Asts: Planinić 8

Ülker Sports Arena, Istanbul
Attendance: 8,400
Referees: Ilyja Belosević (SRB), Dani Hierrezuelo (ESP), Panagiotis Anastopoulos (GRE)

19 October 2012
20:45

Report

Union Olimpija (Slovenia)	75–81	(Turkey) Fenerbahçe Ülker
Scoring by quarter: 20–25, 26–18, 15–20, 14–18
Pts: Prepelič 13; Rebs: Baynes 12; Asts: Blažič 3		Pts: McCalebb 17; Rebs: Preldžič 6 Asts: McCalebb 5

Arena Stožice, Ljubljana
Attendance: 8,200
Referees: Jose Ramon Garcia Ortiz (ESP), Roberto Chiari (ITA), Marcin Kowalski (POL)

25 October 2012
19:00

Report

Fenerbahçe Ülker (Turkey)	75–83	(Spain) Real Madrid
Scoring by quarter: 13–21, 23–21, 21–24, 18–17
Pts: Onan 14; Rebs: McCalebb 4 Asts: Preldžič 6		Pts: Fernández 21; Rebs: Mirotić, Begić 6 Asts: Rodríguez 6

Ülker Sports Arena, Istanbul
Attendance: 12,100
Referees: Christos Christodoulou (GRE), Borys Ryzhyk (UKR), Damir Javor (SLO)

1 November 2012
20:00

Report

Fenerbahçe Ülker (Turkey)	73–64	(Greece) Panathinaikos
Scoring by quarter: 19–17, 23–12, 16–12, 15–23
Pts: McCalebb, Bogdanovic 13; Rebs: Karaman 7 Asts: Bremer 3		Pts: Mačiulis 14; Rebs: Mačiulis 10; Asts: Schortsanitis 4

Ülker Sports Arena, Istanbul
Attendance: 13,000
Referees: Carl Jungebrand (FIN), Robert Lottermoser (GER), Matej Boltauzer (SLO)

8 November 2012
20:45

Report

Mapooro Cantù (Italy)	82–58	Fenerbahçe Ülker (Turkey)
Scoring by quarter: 23–12, 18–15, 16–14, 25–17
Pts: Tabu 16; Rebs: Leunen 7 Asts: Tabu 7		Pts: Sato 10; Rebs: Three Players 3 Asts: Three Players 3

Palasport di Desio, Desio
Attendance: 4,044
Referees: José Martín (ESP), Luis Lopes (POR), Olegs Latisevs (LAT)

15 November 2012
19:30
(*)Real score is 69-70
(**)Real point is 12

Report

BC Khimki (Russia)	71(*)–70	(Turkey) Fenerbahçe Ülker
Scoring by quarter: 17–18, 22–11, 17–22, 15–19
Pts: Rivers 14 (**); Rebs: Monya 6 Asts: Monya 5		Pts: Andersen 17; Rebs: Sato 8 Asts: Ermiş, Preldžič 4

Basketball Center, Khimki
Attendance: 4,250
Referees: Sasa Pukl (SLO), Spiros Gkontas (GRE), Marius Ciulin (ROM)

22 November 2012
20:00

Report

Fenerbahçe Ülker (Turkey)	85–68	(Slovenia) Union Olimpija
Scoring by quarter: 22–12, 21–14, 21–22, 21–20
Pts: Bogdanović 19; Rebs: Andersen 9 Asts: McCalebb 4		Pts: Page 23; Rebs: Omic 13; Asts: Waters 5

Ülker Sports Arena, Istanbul
Attendance: 5,300
Referees: Jakub Zamojski (POL), Eddie Viator (FRA), Renaud Geller (BEL)

30 November 2012
20:45

Report

Real Madrid (Spain)	77–61	(Turkey) Fenerbahçe Ülker
Scoring by quarter: 16–19, 20–20, 18–13, 23–9
Pts: Mirotić 18; Rebs: Slaughter 10; Asts: Suárez 4		Pts: Bogdanović 18; Rebs: Andersen 6 Asts: Preldžić 2

Palacio de Deportes, Madrid
Attendance: 10,137
Referees: Ilija Belosevic (SRB), Nicola Maestre (FRA), Milija Vojinovic (SRB)

7 December 2012
21:00

Report

Panathinaikos Athens (Greece)	69–55	(Turkey) Fenerbahçe Ülker İstanbul
Scoring by quarter: 12–14, 17–9, 14–14, 26–18
Pts: Panko 15; Rebs: Four players 6 Asts: Diamantidis 9		Pts: Sato 20; Rebs: Sato 8 Asts: Sato 3

O.A.C.A., Athens
Attendance: 15,000
Referees: Grzegorz Ziemblicki (POL), Juan Carlos Garcia Gonzalez (ESP), Antonio Conde (ESP)

13 December 2012
18:00

Fenerbahçe Ülker İstanbul (Turkey)	77–69	(Italy) Mapooro Cantù
Scoring by quarter: 18–22, 25–16, 17–17, 17–14
Pts: McCalebb 19; Rebs: Sato 8 Asts: McCalebb 3		Pts: Markoishvili 20; Rebs: Brooks 6 Asts: Brooks 6

Ülker Sports Arena, Istanbul
Attendance: 9,800
Referees: Juan Carlos Arteaga (ESP), Matej Boltauzer (SLO), Miguel Perez Perez (ESP)

==== Group G Top 16 ====
===== Standing =====
Pos	Team	Pld	W	L	PF	PA	PD	Qualification
1	(Spain) FC Barcelona Regal	14	13	1	1151	986	+165	Advance to quarterfinals
2	(Greece) Olympiacos	14	9	5	1068	1033	+35	Advance to quarterfinals
3	(Israel) Maccabi Tel Aviv	14	8	6	1105	1012	+93	Advance to quarterfinals
4	(Spain) Laboral Kutxa	14	8	6	1093	1045	+48	Advance to quarterfinals
5	(Russia) Khimki	14	7	7	1133	1051	+82	
6	(Italy) Montepaschi Siena	14	7	7	1036	1057	−21	
7	(Turkey) Beşiktaş	14	2	12	893	1104	−211	
8	(Turkey) Fenerbahçe Ülker	14	2	12	1055	1246	−191	

Source: Euroleague

===== Fixtures/results =====
28 December 2012
20:45

Report

FC Barcelona Regal (Spain)	100–78	(Turkey) Fenerbahçe Ülker İstanbul
Scoring by quarter: 24–13, 30–22, 25–25, 21–18
Pts: Huertas, Navarro 14; Rebs: Tomić 11; Asts: Sada, Huertas 6		Pts: Bogdanović 19; Rebs: Sato 4 Asts: Sato 5

Palau Blaugrana, Barcelona
Attendance: 4,693
Referees: Milivoje Jovcic (SRB), Eddie Viator (FRA), Boris Shulga (UKR)

4 January 2013
19:00

Report

Fenerbahçe Ülker İstanbul (Turkey)	92–98	(Italy) Montepaschi Siena
Scoring by quarter: 26–26, 25–19, 22–24, 19–29
Pts: Bogdanović 31; Rebs: Preldžić 6 Asts: Preldžić 8		Pts: Brown 41; Rebs: Sanikidze 8 Asts: Brown 7

Ülker Sports Arena, Istanbul
Attendance: 9,200
Referees: Jose Ramon Garcia Ortiz (ESP), Sinisa Herceg (SLO), Petar Obradovic (BIH)

10 January 2013
20:05

Report

Maccabi Tel Aviv (Israel)	91–73	(Turkey) Fenerbahçe Ülker İstanbul
Scoring by quarter: 23-21, 13-15, 17-12, 38-25
Pts: Hickman 24; Rebs: James, Hickman 5 Asts: Roth 6		Pts: three players 15; Rebs: Batiste 9 Asts: Preldžić 5

Nokia Arena, Tel Aviv
Attendance: 11,060
Referees: Vicente Bulto (ESP), Emilio Perez Pizarro (ESP), Robert Lottermoser (GER)

18 January 2013
19:30

Report

Fenerbahçe Ülker İstanbul (Turkey)	75–97	(Spain) Caja Laboral
Scoring by quarter: 19-20, 13-28, 19-23, 24-26
Pts: Bogdanović, Preldžić 16; Rebs: Andersen, Savaş 4 Asts: Andersen, Preldžić 3		Pts: Nocioni 19; Rebs: Lampe 9 Asts: Heurtel 6

Ülker Sports Arena, Istanbul
Attendance: 6,200
Referees: Ilija Belosevic (SRB), Spiros Gkontas (GRE), Robert Vyklicky (CZE)

24 January 2013
19:30

Report

Fenerbahçe Ülker İstanbul (Turkey)	85–82	(Russia) BC Khimki
Scoring by quarter: 17–19, 19–21, 20–14, 29–28
Pts: Bogdanović 26; Rebs: Sato, Peker 7 Asts: McCalebb 4		Pts: Planinić 25; Rebs: Planinić 6 Asts: Planinić 6

Ülker Sports Arena, Istanbul
Attendance: 4,300
Referees: José Martín (ESP), Antonio Conde (ESP), Joseph Bissang (FRA)

31 January 2013
20:45

Report

Olympiacos Piraeus (Greece)	82–71	(Turkey) Fenerbahçe Ülker İstanbul
Scoring by quarter: 23-24, 20-13, 25-12, 14-22
Pts: Spanoulis 15; Rebs: Perperoglou 9 Asts: Spanoulis 5		Pts: McCalebb, Bogdanović 20; Rebs: McCalebb 6 Asts: McCalebb 3

Peace and Friendship Stadium, Piraeus
Attendance: 7,000
Referees: Fernando Rocha (POR), Olegs Latisevs (LAT), Luis Lopes (POR)

=== Turkish Basketball Cup ===
==== Group D ====
===== Standing =====
Pos	Team	Pld	W	L	PF	PA	PD	Pts	Qualification
1	Galatasaray Medical Park	3	3	0	207	173	+34	6	Advance to Final 8
2	Fenerbahçe Ülker	3	2	1	243	203	+40	5	Advance to Final 8
3	Olin Edirne	3	1	2	190	210	−20	4	
4	Erdemir	3	0	3	180	234	−54	3	

Source: Turkish Basketball Federation

===== Matches =====
2 October 2012
18:00 EET

Boxscore

Fenerbahçe Ülker	91–59	Erdemir

Halkapınar Sport Hall, İzmir

3 October 2012
20:15 EET

Boxscore

Olin Edirne	70–83	Fenerbahçe Ülker

Halkapınar Sport Hall, İzmir

4 October 2012
19:15 EET

Boxscore

Galatasaray Medical Park	74–69	Fenerbahçe Ülker

Halkapınar Sport Hall, İzmir

==== Quarterfinal ====
6 February 2013
20:45 EET

Boxscore

Pınar Karşıyaka	69–77	Fenerbahçe Ülker
Scoring by quarter: 15 – 13, 22 – 26, 16 – 20, 16 – 18
Pts: Thomas 14; Rebs: Dixon, Paçun 6 Asts: Thomas 4		Pts: Onan 18; Rebs: Peker 8 Asts: Ermiş 3

Anadolu University BESYO Sport Hall, Eskişehir
Referees: Rüştü Nuran

==== Semifinal ====
8 February 2013
18:30 EET

Boxscore

Beşiktaş	66–75	Fenerbahçe Ülker
Scoring by quarter: 16 – 14, 9 – 25, 20 – 13, 21 – 23
Pts: Vidmar, Çetin 13; Rebs: Vidmar 7 Asts: Çetin 4		Pts: Andersen 15; Rebs: Andersen 9 Asts: McCalebb, Ermiş 4

Anadolu University BESYO Sport Hall, Eskişehir
Referees: Murat Biricik

==== Final ====
10 February 2013
15:00 EET

Boxscore

Fenerbahçe Ülker	63–57	Galatasaray Medical Park
Scoring by quarter: 21 – 15, 8 – 17, 12–12, 22 – 13
Pts: Andersen 21; Rebs: Peker 7 Asts: three players 3		Pts: N'Dong 12; Rebs: Aldemir 9 Asts: Arroyo 7

Anadolu University BESYO Sport Hall, Eskişehir
Referees: Mehmet Keseratar
