= 2013 TBL Playoffs =

2013 Turkish basketball competition

TBL Playoffs
- Season: 2012–13
- Dates: 17 May – 15 June 2013
- Games played: 21
- Teams: 8

Finals
- Champions: Galatasaray Medical Park (5th title)
- Runners-up: Banvit
- Semifinalists: Anadolu Efes; Pınar Karşıyaka
- Finals MVP: (United States) Jamont Gordon
- All statistics correct as of 16 May 2019.

2013 TBL Playoffs was the final phase of the 2012-13 Turkish Basketball League. It started on 17 May, 2013, and ended on June 15, 2013. Beşiktaş were the defending champions.

The eight highest placed teams of the regular season qualified for the playoffs. In the quarter-finals a best-of-three was played, in the semi-finals a best-of-five and in the finals a best-of-seven playoff format was used.

Galatasaray Medical Park competed against Banvit in the finals, won the series 4-1 and got their 5th championship.

== Bracket ==
Quarterfinals
1	Galatasaray Medical Park	2
8	Tofaş	0
4	Fenerbahçe Ülker	0
5	Pınar Karşıyaka	2
2	Anadolu Efes	2
7	TED Ankara Kolejliler	1
3	Banvit	2
6	Beşiktaş	0

Semifinals
1	Galatasaray Medical Park	3
5	Pınar Karşıyaka	0
2	Anadolu Efes	1
3	Banvit	3

Finals
1	Galatasaray Medical Park	4
3	Banvit	1

== Quarterfinals ==
=== Galatasaray Medical Park vs. Tofaş ===
May 18, 2013
13:00 EEST

Report

Galatasaray Medical Park	92–64	Tofaş
Scoring by quarter: 26–26, 16–11, 29–15, 21–12
Pts: Arroyo 21; Rebs: Aldemir, Dudley 8 Asts: Arroyo 6		Pts: Elonu, Nichols 12; Rebs: Elonu 6 Asts: Alıntığ 3
1-0

Abdi İpekçi Arena, Istanbul
Referees: Rüştü Nuran (TUR), Özlem Yalman (TUR), Mehmet Serdar Ünal (TUR)

May 21, 2013
18:00 EEST

Report

Tofaş	49–82	Galatasaray Medical Park
Scoring by quarter: 6–26, 24–26, 15–11, 4–17
Pts: Elonu, Altıntığ 11; Rebs: Elonu 11; Asts: Sipahi, Altıntığ 3		Pts: Gordon 21; Rebs: N'Dong 9 Asts: Arroyo 6
Galatasaray Medical Park wins series 2-0

Atatürk Sport Hall, Bursa
Referees: Mehmet Keseratar (TUR), Erşan Kartal (TUR), Ahmet Ersan Ergüler (TUR)

=== Anadolu Efes vs. TED Ankara Kolejliler ===
May 17, 2013
20:00 EEST

Report

Anadolu Efes	76–79	TED Ankara Kolejliler
Scoring by quarter: 23–19, 24–22, 14–21, 15–17
Pts: Gönlüm 16; Rebs: Gönlüm 9 Asts: Savanović 5		Pts: Penney 27; Rebs: Yücel 10; Asts: Woodside 5
0-1

Ayhan Şahenk Arena, Istanbul
Referees: Recep Ankaralı (TUR), Yener Yılmaz (TUR), Ziya Özorhon (TUR)

May 20, 2013
18:00 EEST

Report

TED Ankara Kolejliler	79–96	Anadolu Efes
Scoring by quarter: 19–33, 16–25, 22–19, 22–19
Pts: Penney, Plisnić 16; Rebs: Yücel 13; Asts: Woodside 11		Pts: Savanović 22; Rebs: Savanović 8 Asts: Shipp 7
1-1

TOBB Sport Hall, Ankara
Referees: Engin Kennerman (TUR), Halil Baldemir (TUR), Ahmet Tatlıcı (TUR)

May 23, 2013
19:00 EEST

Report

Anadolu Efes	97–61	TED Ankara Kolejliler
Scoring by quarter: 24–18, 20–11, 22-19, 31–13
Pts: Batuk 19; Rebs: Kuqo 7 Asts: Tunçeri 6		Pts: Penney 18; Rebs: Yücel 9 Asts: Woodside 4
Anadolu Efes wins series 2-1

Ayhan Şahenk Arena, Istanbul
Referees: Ali Serkan Emlek (TUR), Fatih Arslanoğlu (TUR), Semih Vural (TUR)

=== Banvit vs. Beşiktaş ===
May 17, 2013
18:00 EEST

Report

Banvit	68–65	Beşiktaş
Scoring by quarter: 8–11, 12–18, 22–20, 26–16
Pts: Simmons, Mejia 12; Rebs: Mejia 9 Asts: Mejia 4		Pts: Markota 18; Rebs: Markota, Vidmar 9 Asts: Açık 7
1-0

Kara Ali Acar Sport Hall, Bandırma
Referees: Rüştü Nuran (TUR), İsmail Aydın (TUR), Fatih Arslanoğlu (TUR)

May 20, 2013
20:00 EEST

Report

Beşiktaş	74–81	Banvit
Scoring by quarter: 16–17, 23–16, 19–19, 16–29
Pts: Özer 20; Rebs: Vidmar 8 Asts: Açık 7		Pts: Davis 23; Rebs: Štimac 13; Asts: Lucas 6
Banvit wins series 2-0

Abdi İpekçi Arena, Istanbul
Referees: Emin Moğulkoç (TUR), Zafer Yılmaz (TUR), Alper Özgök (TUR)

=== Fenerbahçe Ülker vs. Pınar Karşıyaka ===
May 18, 2013
15:30 EEST

Report

Fenerbahçe Ülker	68–74	Pınar Karşıyaka
Scoring by quarter: 20–13, 21–16, 12–25, 15–20
Pts: Peker 13; Rebs: Peker 6 Asts: McCalebb 4		Pts: Sonkol 16; Rebs: Sonkol 8 Asts: Dixon 10
0-1

Ülker Sports Arena, Istanbul
Referees: Mehmet Keseratar (TUR), Erman Erdemli (TUR), Ali Şakacı (TUR)

May 21, 2013
20:00 EEST

Report

Pınar Karşıyaka	81–78	Fenerbahçe Ülker
Scoring by quarter: 20–17, 17–20, 24–22, 20–19
Pts: Aminu 21; Rebs: Thomas 9 Asts: Dixon 7		Pts: Savaş 17; Rebs: Onan 6 Asts: Preldžić 6
Pınar Karşıyaka wins series 2-0

Karşıyaka Arena, İzmir
Referees: Recep Ankaralı (TUR), Aytuğ Ekti (TUR), Uğur Özen (TUR)

== Semifinals ==
=== Galatasaray Medical Park vs. Pınar Karşıyaka ===
May 25, 2013
18:00 EEST

Report

Galatasaray Medical Park	70–54	Pınar Karşıyaka
Scoring by quarter: 28–12, 9–17, 15–16, 18–9
Pts: Gordon 16; Rebs: N'Dong 9 Asts: Dudley 5		Pts: Dixon 14; Rebs: Aminu 9 Asts: Dixon 4
1-0

Abdi İpekçi Arena, Istanbul
Attendance: 6,979
Referees: Murat Biricik (TUR), Zafer Yılmaz (TUR), Alper Özgök (TUR)

May 27, 2013
20:00 EEST

Report

Galatasaray Medical Park	64–59	Pınar Karşıyaka
Scoring by quarter: 15–17, 19–9, 13–17, 17–16
Pts: Arroyo 14; Rebs: Dudley 9 Asts: Dudley 4		Pts: Dixon 16; Rebs: three players 6 Asts: Büker 3
2-0

Abdi İpekçi Arena, Istanbul
Attendance: 7,000
Referees: Emin Moğulkoç (TUR), Ahmet Ersan Ergüler (TUR), Kaan Büyükçil (TUR)

May 30, 2013
20:00 EEST

Report

Pınar Karşıyaka	77–79	Galatasaray Medical Park
Scoring by quarter: 26–18, 8–22, 22–20, 21–19
Pts: Dixon 19; Rebs: Aminu 8 Asts: Dixon 6		Pts: N'Dong 23; Rebs: N'Dong 9 Asts: Arroyo 6
Galatasaray Medical Park wins series 3-0

Karşıyaka Arena, İzmir
Attendance: 5,000
Referees: Mehmet Keseratar (TUR), Halil Baldemir (TUR), Fatih Arslanoğlu (TUR)

=== Anadolu Efes vs. Banvit ===
May 26, 2013
18:00 EEST

Report

Anadolu Efes	72–70	Banvit
Scoring by quarter: 21–16, 15–19, 16–19, 20–16
Pts: Gönlüm 17; Rebs: Gönlüm 8 Asts: Gordon, Tunçeri 3		Pts: Mejia 16; Rebs: Štimac 9 Asts: Erdoğan, Davis 4
1-0

Ayhan Şahenk Arena, Istanbul
Attendance: 1,500
Referees: Aytuğ Ekti (TUR), Halil Baldemir (TUR), Mehmet Serdar Ünal (TUR)

May 28, 2013
19:00 EEST

Report

Anadolu Efes	76–78	Banvit
Scoring by quarter: 24–21, 18–20, 16–13, 18–24
Pts: Erden 20; Rebs: Erden, Gönlüm 7 Asts: Balbay 4		Pts: Erdoğan 15; Rebs: Davis 11; Asts: Davis, Mejia 4
1-1

Ayhan Şahenk Arena, Istanbul
Attendance: 1,000
Referees: Erşan Kartal (TUR), İsmail Aydın (TUR), Alper Altuğ Köselerli (TUR)

May 31, 2013
20:00 EEST

Report

Banvit	75–69	Anadolu Efes
Scoring by quarter: 23–19, 18–19, 11–21, 23–10
Pts: Davis 19; Rebs: Štimac 10; Asts: Mejia 4		Pts: Gönlüm 22; Rebs: Gönlüm 11; Asts: Farmar 5
2-1

Kara Ali Acar Sport Hall, Bandırma
Attendance: 2,500
Referees: Murat Biricik (TUR), Zafer Yılmaz (TUR), Kaan Büyükçil (TUR)

June 2, 2013
16:00 EEST

Report

Banvit	76–65	Anadolu Efes
Scoring by quarter: 23–11, 25–20, 19–17, 9–17
Pts: Davis 23; Rebs: Simmons 9 Asts: Davis, Mejia 4		Pts: Farmar 15; Rebs: Savanović 8 Asts: Tunçeri 5
Banvit wins series 3-1

Kara Ali Acar Sport Hall, Bandırma
Attendance: 2,800
Referees: Mehmet Keseratar (TUR), Yener Yilmaz (TUR), Semih Vural (TUR)

== Finals ==
=== Galatasaray Medical Park vs. Banvit ===
June 5, 2013
20:30 EEST

Report

Galatasaray Medical Park	79–62	Banvit
Scoring by quarter: 16–22, 22–15, 25–12, 16–13
Pts: Gordon 18; Rebs: Aldemir 12; Asts: Arroyo 3		Pts: Mejia, Türkyılmaz 11; Rebs: Mejia 8 Asts: Lucas 4
1-0

Abdi İpekçi Arena, Istanbul
Attendance: 10,500
Referees: Rüştü Nuran (TUR), Alper Özgök (TUR), Mehmet Serdar Ünal (TUR)

June 7, 2013
20:30 EEST

Report

Galatasaray Medical Park	80–66	Banvit
Scoring by quarter: 21–17, 21–23, 26–11, 12–15
Pts: Markoishvili 17; Rebs: Aldemir 8 Asts: Arroyo 4		Pts: Davis 16; Rebs: Mejia 6 Asts: Davis, Lucas 3
2-0

Abdi İpekçi Arena, Istanbul
Attendance: 11,340
Referees: Mehmet Keseratar (TUR), Yener Yılmaz (TUR), Erman Erdemli (TUR)

June 10, 2013
20:00 EEST

Report

Banvit	71–72	Galatasaray Medical Park
Scoring by quarter: 24–12, 14–14, 14–17, 19–29
Pts: Davis 18; Rebs: Mejia 7 Asts: Davis 5		Pts: Arroyo 15; Rebs: Gordon 5 Asts: four players 3
0-3

Kara Ali Acar Sport Hall, Bandırma
Attendance: 3,000
Referees: Murat Biricik (TUR), Fatih Arslanoğlu (TUR), Alper Altuğ Köseler (TUR)

June 12, 2013
20:00 EEST

Report

Banvit	86–85	Galatasaray Medical Park
Scoring by quarter: 21–11, 22–18, 22–18, 21–38
Pts: Simmons 19; Rebs: Davis 7 Asts: three players 3		Pts: Gordon 34; Rebs: Aldemir 7 Asts: Arroyo 4
1-3

Kara Ali Acar Sport Hall, Bandırma
Attendance: 3,000
Referees: Emin Moğulkoç (TUR), Aytuğ Ekti (TUR), Ahmet Ersan Ergüler (TUR)

June 15, 2013
18:00 EEST

Report

Galatasaray Medical Park	76–58	Banvit
Scoring by quarter: 18–12, 19–11, 25–14, 14–21
Pts: Akyol 22; Rebs: Dudley 9 Asts: Arroyo 8		Pts: Erdoğan 11; Rebs: Štimac 10; Asts: Erdoğan 5
Galatasaray Medical Park wins series 4-1

Abdi İpekçi Arena, Istanbul
Attendance: 11,340
Referees: Erşan Kartal (TUR), Zafer Yılmaz (TUR), Halil Baldemir (TUR)

2013 TBL Champions
Galatasaray Medical Park
5th Title
