= 2012–13 Turkish Basketball Cup =

- League: Turkish Basketball Cup
- Sport: Basketball
- Duration: 2 October 2012 – 10 February 2013
- Finals champions: Fenerbahçe Ülker
- Runners-up: Galatasaray Medical Park
- Finals MVP: (Australia) David Andersen

Turkish Basketball Cup seasons
- ← 2011–12 2013–14 →

The 2012–13 Spor Toto Turkish Cup tournament was the 27th edition of what the professional men's basketball teams of Turkey could vie for the Turkish Cup in the final. Fenerbahçe Ülker won their fourth Cup by defeating in the finals Galatasaray S.K. (men's basketball), . The tournament was held at the Galatasaray Medical Park in Bursa, Turkey. It was held from 17 to 21 February. The MVP was David Andersen of Fenerbahçe.

== Group stage ==
=== Group A ===
Group A matches played in Adana from 4–6 October.

Pos	Team	Pld	W	L	PF	PA	PD	Pts	Qualification
1	Anadolu Efes	3	3	0	239	198	+41	6	Advance to Final 8
2	Pınar Karşıyaka	3	2	1	220	201	+19	5	Advance to Final 8
3	Mersin BŞB	3	1	2	208	214	−6	4	
4	Royal Halı Gaziantep	3	0	3	202	256	−54	3	

Source: Turkish Basketball Federation

4 October 2012
18:00 EET

Boxsore

Pınar Karşıyaka	72–63	Mersin BŞB

Menderes Sports Hall, Adana

4 October 2012
20:15 EET

Boxsore

Anadolu Efes	89–72	Royal Halı Gaziantep

Menderes Sports Hall, Adana

5 October 2012
18:00 EET

Boxsore

Mersin BŞB	69–74	Anadolu Efes

Menderes Sports Hall, Adana

5 October 2012
20:15 EET

Boxsore

Royal Halı Gaziantep	62–91	Pınar Karşıyaka

Menderes Sports Hall, Adana

6 October 2012
16:00 EET

Boxsore

Mersin BŞB	76–68	Royal Halı Gaziantep

Menderes Sports Hall, Adana

6 October 2012
18:15 EET

Boxsore

Anadolu Efes	76–57	Pınar Karşıyaka

Menderes Sports Hall, Adana

=== Group B ===
Group B matches played in İzmit from 5 to 7 October.

Pos	Team	Pld	W	L	PF	PA	PD	Pts	Qualification
1	Beşiktaş	3	3	0	205	185	+20	6	Advance to Final 8
2	Hacettepe Üniversitesi	3	2	1	241	240	+1	5	Advance to Final 8
3	Antalya BŞB	3	1	2	208	217	−9	4	
4	Aliağa Petkim	3	0	3	227	239	−12	3	

Source: Turkish Basketball Federation

5 October 2012
18:00 EET

Boxscore

Aliağa Petkim	89–90	Hacettepe Üniversitesi

Şehit Polis Recep Topaloğlu Sports Hall, İzmit

5 October 2012
20:15 EET

Boxscore

Beşiktaş	61–52	Antalya BŞB

Şehit Polis Recep Topaloğlu Sports Hall, İzmit

6 October 2012
16:00 EET

Boxscore

Hacettepe Üniversitesi	62–67	Beşiktaş

Şehit Polis Recep Topaloğlu Sports Hall, İzmit

6 October 2012
18:15 EET

Boxscore

Antalya BŞB	72–67	Aliağa Petkim

Şehit Polis Recep Topaloğlu Sports Hall, İzmit

7 October 2012
13:00 EET

Boxscore

Hacettepe Üniversitesi	89–84	Antalya BŞB

Şehit Polis Recep Topaloğlu Sports Hall, İzmit

7 October 2012
15:30 EET

Boxscore

Beşiktaş	77–71	Aliağa Petkim

Şehit Polis Recep Topaloğlu Sports Hall, İzmit

=== Group C ===
Group C matches played in Manisa from 5 to 7 October.

Pos	Team	Pld	W	L	PF	PA	PD	Pts	Qualification
1	Banvit	3	3	0	269	204	+65	6	Advance to Final 8
2	TED Ankara Kolejliler	3	2	1	240	241	−1	5	Advance to Final 8
3	Tofaş Bursa	3	1	2	189	218	−29	4	
4	Türk Telekom	3	0	3	208	243	−35	3	

Source: Turkish Basketball Federation

5 October 2012
17:30 EET

Boxscore

Tofaş Bursa	76–57	Türk Telekom

Atatürk Sport Hall, Manisa

5 October 2012
19:45 EET

Boxscore

Banvit	100–81	TED Ankara Kolejliler

Atatürk Sport Hall, Manisa

6 October 2012
15:30 EET

Boxscore

Türk Telekom	69–86	Banvit

Atatürk Sport Hall, Manisa

6 October 2012
17:45 EET

Boxscore

TED Ankara Kolejliler	75–59	Tofaş Bursa

Atatürk Sport Hall, Manisa

7 October 2012
15:30 EET

Boxscore

Türk Telekom	82–84	TED Ankara Kolejliler

Atatürk Sport Hall, Manisa

7 October 2012
17:45 EET

Boxscore

Banvit	86–54	Tofaş Bursa

Atatürk Sport Hall, Manisa

=== Group D ===
Group D matches played in İzmir from 2 to 4 October.

Pos	Team	Pld	W	L	PF	PA	PD	Pts	Qualification
1	Galatasaray Medical Park	3	3	0	207	173	+34	6	Advance to Final 8
2	Fenerbahçe Ülker	3	2	1	243	203	+40	5	Advance to Final 8
3	Olin Edirne	3	1	2	190	210	−20	4	
4	Erdemir	3	0	3	180	234	−54	3	

Source: Turkish Basketball Federation

2 October 2012
18:00 EET

Boxscore

Fenerbahçe Ülker	91–59	Erdemir

Halkapınar Sport Hall, İzmir

2 October 2012
20:15 EET

Boxscore

Galatasaray Medical Park	62–48	Olin Edirne

Halkapınar Sport Hall, İzmir

3 October 2012
18:00 EET

Boxscore

Erdemir	56–71	Galatasaray Medical Park

Halkapınar Sport Hall, İzmir

3 October 2012
20:15 EET

Boxscore

Olin Edirne	70–83	Fenerbahçe Ülker

Halkapınar Sport Hall, İzmir

4 October 2012
17:00 EET

Boxscore

Erdemir	65–72	Olin Edirne

Halkapınar Sport Hall, İzmir

4 October 2012
19:15 EET

Boxscore

Galatasaray Medical Park	74–69	Fenerbahçe Ülker

Halkapınar Sport Hall, İzmir

== Final 8 ==
The final rounds were played among the top eight teams out of four groups in 6–10 February 2013. Quarter-finals were played on 7 February 2013. Semi-finals were on 8 February 2013. Final match was played on 10 February 2013.

== Finals bracket ==
Quarterfinals
Pınar Karşıyaka	69
Fenerbahçe Ülker	77
Beşiktaş	86
TED Ankara Kolejliler	77
Hacettepe Üniversitesi	63
Banvit	77
Galatasaray Medical Park	72
Anadolu Efes	64

Semifinals
Beşiktaş	66
Fenerbahçe Ülker	75
Banvit	68
Galatasaray Medical Park	81

Final
Fenerbahçe Ülker	63
Galatasaray Medical Park	57

== Quarter-final ==
6 February 2013
18:30 EET

Boxscore

Beşiktaş	86–77	TED Ankara Kolejliler
Scoring by quarter: 23 – 21, 18 – 13, 20 – 22, 25 – 21
Pts: Özer 17; Rebs: Özer, Nalga 7 Asts: Jerrells 8		Pts: Stanojević 26; Rebs: Stanojević, Yücel 9 Asts: Woodside 10

Anadolu University BESYO Sport Hall, Eskişehir
Referees: Engin Kennerman

6 February 2013
20:45 EET

Boxscore

Pınar Karşıyaka	69–77	Fenerbahçe Ülker
Scoring by quarter: 15 – 13, 22 – 26, 16 – 20, 16 – 18
Pts: Thomas 14; Rebs: Dixon, Paçun 6 Asts: Thomas 4		Pts: Onan 18; Rebs: Peker 8 Asts: Ermiş 3

Anadolu University BESYO Sport Hall, Eskişehir
Referees: Rüştü Nuran

7 February 2013
18:30 EET

Boxscore

Hacettepe Üniversitesi	63–77	Banvit
Scoring by quarter: 12 – 17, 19 – 22, 10 – 19, 22 – 19
Pts: three players 12; Rebs: Beşok 8 Asts: four players 2		Pts: Štimac 11; Rebs: Štimac, Bajramović 6 Asts: Edge, Lucas 3

Anadolu University BESYO Sport Hall, Eskişehir
Referees: Aytuğ Ekti

7 February 2013
20:45 EET

Boxscore

Galatasaray Medical Park	72–64	Anadolu Efes
Scoring by quarter: 17 – 16, 14 – 20, 21 – 10, 20 – 18
Pts: Gordon 18; Rebs: Macvan 9 Asts: Gordon 5		Pts: Savanovic 19; Rebs: Savanovic 7 Asts: Lucas 19

Anadolu University BESYO Sport Hall, Eskişehir
Referees: Mehmet Keseratar

== Semi-final ==
8 February 2013
18:30 EET

Boxscore

Beşiktaş	66–75	Fenerbahçe Ülker
Scoring by quarter: 16 – 14, 9 – 25, 20 – 13, 21 – 23
Pts: Vidmar, Çetin 13; Rebs: Vidmar 7 Asts: Çetin 4		Pts: Andersen 15; Rebs: Andersen 9 Asts: McCalebb, Ermiş 4

Anadolu University BESYO Sport Hall, Eskişehir
Referees: Murat Biricik

8 February 2013
18:30 EET

Boxscore

Banvit	68–81 (OT)	Galatasaray Medical Park
Scoring by quarter: 20 – 17, 11 – 20, 13 – 20, 19 – 6, Overtime: 5 – 18
Pts: Davis 21; Rebs: Davis 8 Asts: three players 2		Pts: Gordon 29; Rebs: Aldemir 11; Asts: Gordon 4

Anadolu University BESYO Sport Hall, Eskişehir
Referees: Recep Ankaralı

== Final ==
10 February 2013
15:00 EET

Boxscore

Fenerbahçe Ülker	63–57	Galatasaray Medical Park
Scoring by quarter: 21 – 15, 8 – 17, 12–12, 22 – 13
Pts: Andersen 21; Rebs: Peker 7 Asts: three players 3		Pts: N'Dong 12; Rebs: Aldemir 9 Asts: Arroyo 7

Anadolu University BESYO Sport Hall, Eskişehir
Referees: Mehmet Keseratar
