= 2009–10 Euroleague Top 16 Group H =

Standings and Results for Group H of the Top 16 phase of the 2009–10 Euroleague basketball tournament.

== Standings ==
Key to colors
Top two places in each group advance to Quarterfinals
Eliminated

	Team	Pld	W	L	PF	PA	Diff	Tie-break
1.	(Greece) Olympiacos Piraeus	6	5	1	536	504	+32	
2.	(Spain) Caja Laboral Baskonia	6	3	3	515	521	−6	1–1, 0, –6 overall
3.	(Russia) Khimki Moscow Region	6	3	3	476	487	−11	1–1, 0, –11 overall
4.	(Croatia) Cibona Zagreb	6	1	5	486	501	−15	

== Fixtures and results ==
All times given below are in Central European Time.

Unless otherwise indicated, all attendance totals are from the corresponding match report posted on the official Euroleague site and included with each game summary.

=== Game 1 ===
28 January 2010
18:00

Report

Khimki Moscow Region (Russia)	83–70	(Croatia) Cibona Zagreb
Scoring by quarter: 17-17, 19-18, 16-18, 31-17
Pts: Javtokas, McCarty 17; Rebs: Javtokas 9 Asts: Fridzon, Cabezas, López 3		Pts: Tomas 17; Rebs: Tomas 6 Asts: Gordon, Tomas 4

Basketball Center of Moscow Region
Attendance: 3,000
Referees: Fabio Facchini (ITA), Juan Carlos García González (ESP), Zdravko Rutešić (MNE)

28 January 2010
20:45

Report

Caja Laboral Baskonia (Spain)	85–89	(Greece) Olympiacos Piraeus
Scoring by quarter: 18-25, 21-20, 24-20, 22-24
Pts: Huertas 23; Rebs: Splitter 6 Asts: San Emeterio 7		Pts: Childress 21; Rebs: Bourousis 11; Asts: Papaloukas, Teodosić 6

Fernando Buesa Arena
Attendance: 9,700
Referees: Carl Jungebrand (FIN), Matej Boltauzer (SLO), Olegs Latisevs (LAT)

=== Game 2 ===
3 February 2010
20:00

Report

Olympiacos Piraeus (Greece)	87–69	(Russia) Khimki Moscow Region
Scoring by quarter: 22-10, 16-18, 23-24, 26-17
Pts: Halperin 15; Rebs: Kleiza 7 Asts: Teodosić 4		Pts: Langford 18; Rebs: Javtokas 9 Asts: Langford, McCarty 3

Peace and Friendship Stadium
Attendance: 7,400
Referees: Dani Hierrezuelo (ESP), Emilio Pérez Pizarro (ESP), Milija Vojinovic (SRB)

4 February 2010
18:30

Report

Cibona Zagreb (Croatia)	75–78	(Spain) Caja Laboral Baskonia
Scoring by quarter: 23-13, 18-20, 19-25, 15-20
Pts: Tomas 22; Rebs: Gordon 10; Asts: Gordon 3		Pts: Eliyahu 22; Rebs: Eliyahu 9 Asts: Huertas 8

Dražen Petrović Basketball Hall
Attendance: 4,500
Referees: Shmuel Bachar (ISR), Fernando Rocha (POR), Robert Lottermoser (GER)

=== Game 3 ===
10 February 2010
20:00

Report

Olympiacos Piraeus (Greece)	78–75	(Croatia) Cibona Zagreb
Scoring by quarter: 16-15, 18-20, 24-26, 20-14
Pts: Teodosić 17; Rebs: Childress 9 Asts: Papaloukas 7		Pts: Tomas 23; Rebs: Radošević 6 Asts: Gordon 5

Peace and Friendship Stadium
Attendance: 5,200
Referees: Juan Carlos Mitjana (ESP), Tomas Jasevicius (LTU), Oliver Krause (GER)

11 February 2010
20:30

Report

Caja Laboral Baskonia (Spain)	71–82	(Russia) Khimki Moscow Region
Scoring by quarter: 16-26, 20-18, 14-19, 21-19
Pts: Eliyahu 17; Rebs: Teletović 5 Asts: Huertas, Eliyahu, San Emeterio 3		Pts: McCarty 23; Rebs: Javtokas 7 Asts: López 5

Fernando Buesa Arena
Attendance: 8,800
Referees: Romualdas Brazauskas (LTU), Christos Christodoulou (GRE), Eddie Viator (FRA)

=== Game 4 ===
24 February 2010
18:30

Report

Cibona Zagreb (Croatia)	94–97	(Greece) Olympiacos Piraeus
Scoring by quarter: 25-18, 20-25, 20-27, 29-27
Pts: Gordon 32; Rebs: Radošević, Andrić 6 Asts: Gordon 4		Pts: Teodosić 22; Rebs: Childress 5 Asts: Papaloukas, Teodosić 6

Dražen Petrović Basketball Hall
Attendance: 4,500
Referees: Guerrino Cerebuch (ITA), Marek Cmikiewicz (POL), Eddie Viator (FRA)

25 February 2010
18:00

Report

Khimki Moscow Region (Russia)	83–94	(Spain) Caja Laboral Baskonia
Scoring by quarter: 18–24, 21–22, 26–24, 18–24
Pts: Langford 27; Rebs: McCarty, Mozgov 7 Asts: McCarty 4		Pts: Teletović 25; Rebs: San Emeterio 4 Asts: Barać, Huertas 4

Basketball Center of Moscow Region
Attendance: 3,000
Referees: Lazaros Voreadis (GRE), Tolga Sahin (TUR), David Chambon (FRA)

=== Game 5 ===
3 March 2010
18:30

Report

Cibona Zagreb (Croatia)	82–63	(Russia) Khimki Moscow Region
Scoring by quarter: 20-17, 20-8, 18-18, 24-20
Pts: Gordon 23; Rebs: Bogdanović, Andrić 9 Asts: Gordon, Troha 3		Pts: Langford 16; Rebs: Javtokas 6 Asts: Langford, Cabezas 3

Dražen Petrović Basketball Hall
Attendance: 3,000
Referees: Ilija Belošević (SRB), Saša Pukl (SLO), Roberto Chiari (ITA)

4 March 2010
20:45

Report

Olympiacos Piraeus (Greece)	102–85	(Spain) Caja Laboral Baskonia
Scoring by quarter: 22-29, 27-16, 31-16, 22-24
Pts: Childress 20; Rebs: Childress 10; Asts: Vujčić 5		Pts: Teletović 25; Rebs: Teletović 9 Asts: Ribas 7

Peace and Friendship Stadium
Attendance: 8,200
Referees: Grzegorz Ziemblicki (POL), Milivoje Jovcic (SRB), Paolo Taurino (ITA)

=== Game 6 ===
11 March 2010
19:15

Report

Khimki Moscow Region (Russia)	96–83	(Greece) Olympiacos Piraeus
Scoring by quarter: 32–19, 23–21, 23–19, 18–24
Pts: Langford 24; Rebs: Javtokas 7 Asts: Langford 7		Pts: Kleiza, Teodosić 17; Rebs: Mavrokefalidis 7 Asts: Papaloukas, Teodosić 4

Basketball Center of Moscow Region
Attendance: 4,000
Referees: Shmuel Bachar (ISR), Borys Ryzhyk (UKR), Milija Vojinović (SRB)

11 March 2010
19:15

Report

Caja Laboral Baskonia (Spain)	102–90 (OT)	(Croatia) Cibona Zagreb
Scoring by quarter: 18–19, 14–18, 17–18, 29–23, Overtime: 24–12
Pts: Teletović 25; Rebs: Barać 11; Asts: Huertas 7		Pts: Tomas 23; Rebs: Andrić, Gordon, Vukušić 8 Asts: Gordon 8

Fernando Buesa Arena
Attendance: 9,600
Referees: Carl Jungebrand (FIN), Jakub Zamojski (POL), Spiros Gkontas (GRE)
