= 2012–13 Turkish Basketball League =

- League: Turkish Basketball League
- Sport: Basketball
- Games: 240 (regular season)
- Teams: 16
- Total attendance: 454,895
- Average attendance: 1,743
- TV partner: Lig TV

Regular season
- Season champions: Galatasaray Medical Park
- Top scorer: (Turkey) Ali Karadeniz (Mersin BB)

2013 TBL Playoffs

TBL Finals
- Champions: Galatasaray Medical Park
- Runners-up: Banvit
- Finals MVP: (United States) Jamont Gordon

TBL seasons
- ← 2011–12 2013–14 →

The 2012–13 Turkish Basketball League, which is called Beko Basketball League due to sponsorship reasons, was the 47th season of the top professional basketball league in Turkey.

The regular season started on October 13, 2012, and ended on May 15, 2013. Playoffs started on May 17, 2013, and ended on June 15, 2013. Beşiktaş were the defending champions. Galatasaray Medical Park won their 5th title, after not winning one for twenty three years.

== Clubs and arenas ==
The league consists of the following member clubs:

Club	Location	Foun.Year	Arena	Capacity	Last Year	Head coach
Aliağa Petkim	İzmir	1963	Enka Sport Hall	2,500	7th(RS), QF(Play-off)	(Turkey) Hakan Demir
Anadolu Efes	Istanbul	1976	Ayhan Şahenk Arena (for a while)	3,500	3rd(RS), RU(Play-off)	(Turkey) Oktay Mahmuti
Antalya BB	Antalya	1995	Dilek Sabancı Sport Hall	2,500	13th(RS)	(Turkey) Timuçin Meriç
Banvit	Bandırma	1994	Kara Ali Acar Sport Hall	2,500	2nd(RS), SF(Play-off)	(Turkey) Orhun Ene
Beşiktaş	Istanbul	1933	Abdi İpekçi Arena	12,500	4th(RS), Winner(Play-off)	(Turkey) Erman Kunter
Erdemir	Zonguldak	1966	Erdemir Sport Hall	2,250	11th(RS)	(Turkey) Özhan Çivgin
Fenerbahçe Ülker	Istanbul	1913	Ülker Sports Arena	13,800	5th(RS), QF(Play-off)	(Turkey) Ertuğrul Erdoğan
Galatasaray Medical Park	Istanbul	1911	Abdi İpekçi Arena	12,500	1st(RS), SF(Play-off)	(Turkey) Ergin Ataman
Hacettepe Üniv.	Ankara	1982	Ankara Arena	10,400	12th(RS)	(Turkey) Alp Bayramoğlu
Mersin BB	Mersin	1993	Edip Buran Sport Hall	2,500	10th(RS)	(Turkey) Mete Babaoğlu
Olin Edirne	Edirne	2006	Mimar Sinan Sport Hall	2,100	14th(RS)	(Turkey) Gökhan Taştimur
Pınar Karşıyaka	İzmir	1966	Karşıyaka Arena	5,000	6th(RS), QF(Play-off)	(Turkey) Ufuk Sarıca
Royal Halı Gaziantep	Gaziantep	2007	Kamil Ocak Sport Hall	2,500	2nd (TB2L)	(Turkey) Cem Akdağ
TED Ankara Kolejliler	Ankara	1954	TOBB Sport Hall	2,000	Winner (TB2L)	(Turkey) Ercüment Sunter
Tofaş	Bursa	1974	Bursa Atatürk Sport Hall	2,900	8th(RS), QF(Play-off)	(Turkey) Ahmet Çakı
Türk Telekom	Ankara	1980	Ankara Arena	10,400	9th(RS)	(Turkey) Ahmet Bülbül

Locations of the 2012–13 Turkish Basketball League Clubs

== Regular season ==
=== League table ===
Pos	Team	Pld	W	L	PF	PA	PD	Pts	Qualification or relegation
1	Galatasaray Medical Park	30	27	3	2428	2009	+419	57	Qualification to playoffs
2	Anadolu Efes	30	25	5	2491	2113	+378	55	Qualification to playoffs
3	Banvit	30	25	5	2449	2228	+221	55	Qualification to playoffs
4	Fenerbahçe Ülker	30	24	6	2487	2194	+293	54	Qualification to playoffs
5	Pınar Karşıyaka	30	23	7	2345	2083	+262	53	Qualification to playoffs
6	Beşiktaş	30	19	11	2304	2150	+154	49	Qualification to playoffs
7	TED Kolejliler	30	18	12	2482	2435	+47	48	Qualification to playoffs
8	Tofaş	30	12	18	2235	2327	−92	42	Qualification to playoffs
9	Royal Halı Gaziantep BB	30	12	18	2298	2432	−134	42	
10	Erdemirspor	30	11	19	2225	2369	−144	41	
11	Aliağa Petkim	30	9	21	2167	2339	−172	39	
12	Mersin BB	30	8	22	2370	2549	−179	38	
13	Türk Telekom	30	8	22	2168	2425	−257	38	
14	Olin Edirne	30	8	22	2131	2266	−135	38	
15	Hacettepe Üniversitesi (R)	30	6	24	2084	2418	−334	36	Relegation to TBL
16	Antalya BB (R)	30	5	25	2235	2562	−327	35	Relegation to TBL

Source: TBF
(R) Relegated

=== Results ===
	APE	AEF	ABB	BAN	BJK	ERD	FBÜ	GSM	HAC	MBB	OLE	KSK	RHG	TED	TOF	TTS
Aliağa Petkim		57–59	74–92	70–87	72–76	66–72	71–79	77–78	73–70	73–82	85–80	75–80	104–86	70–68	81–67	81–79
Anadolu Efes	83–67		96–72	79–69	90–74	76–72	94–76	73–83	91–61	104–71	83–82	71–65	95–57	85–67	86–72	74–69
Antalya BB	83–78	65–74		95–100	83–90	74–75	83–86	57–93	70–88	86–96	59–71	74–88	68–87	73–103	73–68	77–88
Banvit	94–79	82–76	96–67		79–69	92–68	91–88	74–67	85–78	71–60	62–51	65–73	95–81	112–76	85–77	80–72
Beşiktaş Milangaz	79–66	67–74	86–69	56–67		73–62	70–78	72–76	69–63	83–75	87–58	59–70	83–69	110–105	72–55	61–60
Erdemir	71–61	46–78	77–50	75–82	77–92		78–83	62–85	69–71	96–86	82–91	54–64	91–89	82–84	70–79	77–64
Fenerbahçe Ülker	95–61	86–90	90–78	89–69	83–74	82–77		74–67	81–76	74–50	98–61	78–76	95–59	79–77	74–66	103–81
Galatasaray Medical Park	79–67	77–70	85–65	83–75	64–60	84–61	66–53		83–52	68–95	81–62	94–73	84–66	90–66	71–61	89–73
Hacettepe Üniv.	63–66	54–87	78–85	70–91	57–84	75–70	59–92	69–104		72–76	62–70	52–79	88–95	85–92	70–85	75–80
Mersin BB	81–91	98–107	87–86	90–92	84–102	61–88	77–81	68–95	89–69		83–87	78–84	86–98	91–94	85–88	89–81
Olin Edirne	67–72	66–72	83–65	67–69	67–83	90–53	67–83	59–69	60–81	62–74		60–81	75–56	70–76	72–73	63–67
Pınar Karşıyaka	83–51	62–57	90–66	66–68	86–79	92–65	72–66	72–69	83–69	85–73	82–70		57–66	87–66	87–77	79–66
Royal Halı Gaziantep	84–70	82–92	79–72	73–83	76–66	75–78	69–86	67–92	78–61	79–74	85–82	74–87		79–86	69–78	81–69
TED Ankara Kolejliler	80–76	86–85	89–93	76–81	64–69	87–81	74–92	86–94	84–60	88–85	89–85	81–64	91–73		81–72	84–77
Tofaş	76–66	71–94	91–80	76–77	62–74	89–93	81–73	52–66	87–79	71–68	73–75	95–94	77–76	80–93		66–67
Türk Telekom	66–77	57–96	76–75	81–76	59–85	94–103	80–90	70–76	70–77	78–80	81–78	65–84	67–90	55–89	76–70	

Source: TBL Fixtures

== Playoffs ==
Quarterfinals
1	Galatasaray Medical Park	2
8	Tofaş	0
4	Fenerbahçe Ülker	0
5	Pınar Karşıyaka	2
2	Anadolu Efes	2
7	TED Ankara Kolejliler	1
3	Banvit	2
6	Beşiktaş	0

Semifinals
1	Galatasaray Medical Park	3
5	Pınar Karşıyaka	0
2	Anadolu Efes	1
3	Banvit	3

Finals
1	Galatasaray Medical Park	4
3	Banvit	1

== Individual statistics ==
=== Points ===
Rank	Name	Team	Pts	G	PPG
1.	(Turkey) Ali Karadeniz	Mersin BB	643	30	21.4
2.	(Serbia) Jovo Stanojević	TED Ankara Kolejliler	544	29	18.8
3.	(New Zealand) Kirk Penney	TED Ankara Kolejliler	523	29	18.0
4.	(United States) Gerrod Henderson	Erdemir	474	28	16.9
5.	(United States) Joey Dorsey	Royal Halı Gaziantep	354	22	16.1

=== Rebounds ===
Rank	Name	Team	Rbs	G	RPG
1.	(United States) Joey Dorsey	Royal Halı Gaziantep	271	22	12.3
2.	(Turkey) Nedim Yücel	TED Ankara Kolejliler	333	30	11.1
3.	(United States) Torin Francis	Aliağa Petkim	296	30	9.9
4.	(Nigeria) Chinemelu Elonu	Tofaş	219	29	7.6
5.	(Serbia) Vladimir Štimac	Banvit	225	30	7.5

=== Assists ===
Rank	Name	Team	Ast	G	APG
1.	(United States) Ben Woodside	TED Ankara Kolejliler	204	29	7.0
2.	(United States) Dee Brown	Türk Telekom	148	30	4.9
3.	(United States) Andre Collins	Royal Halı Gaziantep	136	28	4.9
4.	(North Macedonia) Jordan Theodore	Antalya BŞB	136	29	4.7
5.	(Turkey) Bobby Dixon	Pınar Karşıyaka	133	30	4.4

=== Blocks ===
Rank	Name	Team	Blk	G	BPG
1.	(Belarus) Artsiom Parakhouski	Olin Edirne	49	30	1.6
2.	(Turkey) Emre Bayav	Erdemir	40	29	1.4
3.	(United States) Charles Davis	Banvit	36	29	1.2
4.	(Nigeria) Chinemelu Elonu	Tofaş	32	29	1.1
5.	(United States) Joey Dorsey	Royal Halı Gaziantep	22	22	1.0

=== Steals ===
Rank	Name	Team	Stl	G	SPG
1.	(United States) J.P. Prince	Mersin BB	55	29	1.9
2.	(North Macedonia) Jordan Theodore	Antalya BB	47	29	1.6
3.	(Slovenia) Sasha Vujačić	Anadolu Efes	28	18	1.6
4.	(United States) Jamon Gordon	Anadolu Efes	44	29	1.5
5.	(North Macedonia) Bo McCalebb	Fenerbahçe Ülker	36	24	1.5

Source: TBL Stats
