= Anthony Grundy =

American basketball player (1979–2019)

Personal information
- Born: April 15, 1979 Louisville, Kentucky, U.S.
- Died: November 14, 2019 (aged 40) Louisville, Kentucky, U.S.
- Listed height: 6 ft 3 in (1.91 m)
- Listed weight: 185 lb (84 kg)

Career information
- High school: Warren Central (Bowling Green, Kentucky); Hargrave Military Academy (Chatham, Virginia)
- College: NC State (1998–2002)
- NBA draft: 2002: undrafted
- Playing career: 2002–2014
- Position: Point guard / shooting guard
- Number: 16

Career history
- 2002–2003: EWE Baskets Oldenburg
- 2003–2004: TSG Ehingen
- 2004: Apoel Nicosia
- 2004: Raleigh Knights
- 2004: Ockelbo BBK
- 2004–2005: A.S. Ramat HaSharon
- 2005: Panteras de Miranda
- 2005–2006: Roanoke Dazzle
- 2006: Atlanta Hawks
- 2006–2007: Siviglia Wear Teramo
- 2007–2009: Panellinios
- 2009–2010: Ferrara
- 2010–2011: AEK Athens
- 2011: Mersin Buyuksehir
- 2011: Petron Blaze Boosters
- 2011–2012: Mersin Buyuksehir
- 2012: Mahram Tehran
- 2012–2013: Kavala
- 2013–2014: Hacettepe Üniversitesi
- 2013: Dukok
- 2014: Azad University Tehran

Career highlights
- 2× Greek League Top Scorer (2008, 2009); All-Greek League Team (2008); PBA Governor's Cup winner (2011); All-NBA D-League First Team (2006); First-team All-ACC (2002)
- Stats at NBA.com
- Stats at Basketball Reference

Anthony Montreace Grundy (April 15, 1979 – November 14, 2019) was an American professional basketball player. At a height of 6 ft 3 in (1.91 m) tall, he played at both the point guard and shooting guard positions.

== High school ==
Grundy began his high school career at Warren Central High School, in Bowling Green, Kentucky, where he played for ABA legend Darel Carrier. During his senior year, Grundy left to play for Scott Shephard and Kevin Keats at Hargrave Military Academy in Chatham, VA.

== College career ==
Grundy initially signed a letter of intent to play for Bradley University as a junior in high school. After pleading his case to Bradley administrators, the university granted him his release. Grundy visited several schools before committing to NC State, where he played college basketball with the NC State Wolfpack. Initially just a bench role player, he was named 1st Team All-ACC during his senior season. That same season, he became the 1st player in school history to lead his team in 5 major statistical categories (Scoring, Assists, Rebounds, Steals, 3-pointers made). Grundy also earned All-ACC-Defensive-team honors in 2002.

== Professional career ==
Grundy played with the National Basketball Association's Atlanta Hawks in 12 games after signing a ten-day contract in the 2005–06 NBA season.

Grundy's final NBA game was played on April 19, 2006, in a 99 - 100 loss to the Cleveland Cavaliers where he recorded 2 points, 2 assists and 1 rebound.

He played in the Italian league with Siviglia Wear Teramo in the 2006–07 season. On July 12, 2007, he joined Panellinios of the Greek League. He was the Greek League's top scorer during the 2007–08 season, averaging 21.5 points per game.

In 2009, he joined Ferrara.

In September 2010, he returned to Greece, signing with AEK Athens He left the team on January 15, 2011.

In January 2011, he signed with Mersin Buyuksehir.

On July 15, 2011, he was signed by the Petron Blaze Boosters as a replacement import for the injured Jeremy Wise. He was able to lead the Boosters win the 2011 PBA Governors Cup over the Talk 'N Text Tropang Texters.

In 2012, he signed with Mahram Tehran of Iran. In 2013, he joined Hacettepe University.

He then began training in the practice sessions of the Greek team AON Palatianis.

== Legal issues ==
In 2011, Grundy was arrested and charged with driving while intoxicated (DWI) for the fourth time. He remained at large until 2017, when he was arrested in Queens, New York, while entering the United States. Grundy had lived in Ghana for several years prior. He was sentenced in October 2017, to two years in prison for a felony charge of DWI, five misdemeanor counts of failing to appear in court and two probation violations.

On June 6, 2019, Grundy struck and killed a pedestrian and left the scene of the accident, then later turned himself in to police. He had no driver's license nor insurance at the time of the collision, while his license plates had expired the previous year.

== Death ==
Grundy died at age 40 on November 14, 2019, after being stabbed during an altercation in his hometown of Louisville.
