= Kerem Gönlüm =

Turkish basketball player (born 1977)

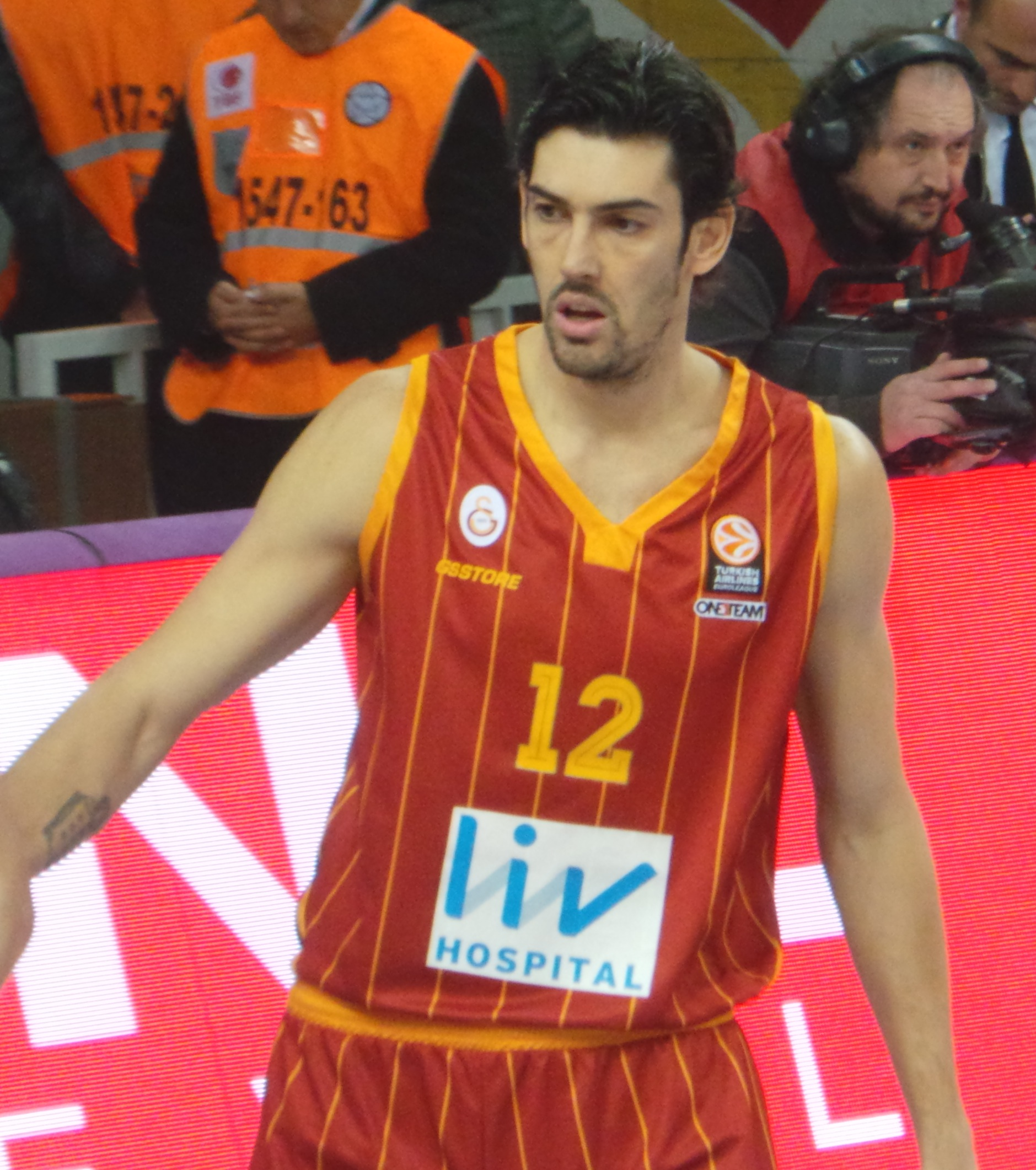
- Gönlüm with Galatasaray in 2014

Personal information
- Born: November 22, 1977 (age 48) Eskişehir, Turkey
- Listed height: 6 ft 10 in (2.08 m)
- Listed weight: 225 lb (102 kg)

Career information
- NBA draft: 1999: undrafted
- Playing career: 1998–2019
- Position: Power forward / center
- Number: 12

Career history
- 1998–1999: Mydonose Kolejliler
- 1999–2005: Ülkerspor
- 2005–2014: Anadolu Efes
- 2014–2015: Galatasaray
- 2015–2016: Pınar Karşıyaka
- 2016–2017: Sakarya BB
- 2017–2018: Bahcesehir
- 2019: İTÜ

Career highlights
- 2× Turkish League champion (2001, 2009); 6× Turkish Cup winner (2003–2007, 2009); Turkish President's Cup winner (2001); Turkish First League champion (2017)

Kerem Gönlüm (born November 22, 1977) is a Turkish former professional basketball player. In January 2019, he started punditry on a local radio station.

== Professional career ==
Between 2005 and 2014, Gönlüm played for Anadolu Efes. Gonlum served a one-year ban stemming from a positive doping test during the 2009 Turkish League final series.

In June 2014, he signed a two-year deal with Galatasaray Liv Hospital. In July 2015, he left Galatasaray and signed with Pınar Karşıyaka.

In July 2016, Gönlüm signed with Sakarya BB of the Turkish Basketball First League. On November 16, 2017, he parted ways with Sakarya and signed with Bahcesehir.

On August 7, 2019, he signed with Sigortam.net İTÜ Basket of the Turkish Basketball League. After playing only 3 games, his contract was terminated by his club.

== National team ==
Gönlüm was a member of the senior Turkish national team. He won a silver medal at the 2010 FIBA World Championship.
