= Hacettepe Üniversitesi B.K. =

Turkish basketball team

Hacettepe Üniversitesi
- Leagues: TÜSF
- Founded: 1982
- Arena: Hacettepe Sıhhiye Spor Salonu
- Capacity: 1000
- Location: Ankara, Turkey
- Team colors: Purple and White
- President: Hacettepe Department of Health, Culture and Sports
- Championships: 2009 EBBL Finalist; 2011 TB2L Runners-up
- Website: husk.hacettepe.edu.tr
Home	Away

Hacettepe University Basketball Club (Turkish: Hacettepe Üniversitesi Basketbol Kulübü) is a professional basketball team based in Ankara, Turkey. The team was founded in 1982. Between 2011 and 2013, Hacettepe competed in the Turkish Basketball Super League, becoming one of the few university teams in the country's history. Their home arena was the Ankara Arena when they were competing at top tier leagues.

== History ==
Shortly after Prof. Dr. Uğur Erdener, a member of the International Olympic Committee's Board of Directors and President of the World Archery Federation, assumed his duties as Rector, the team underwent a restructuring with the goal of promotion to the First League. The team began its journey in the 2008-09 season by competing in the Men's Regional Basketball League - EBBL, the third-tier of basketball.

Hacettepe University SK demonstrated a very successful performance throughout the EBBL, which comprised four stages: the Ankara Group, the Eastern Group, the Qualifying Tournament, and the Final Tournament. After playing twenty matches in the Ankara and Eastern Groups, Hacettepe qualified for the Qualifying Tournament in Alanya without a defeat. In Alanya, where the best 18 teams from the league, which started with 81 teams, gathered. Hacettepe, under the management of Naci Özonay, fought to qualify for the Final Tournament, remaining undefeated in tough matches and earning a place in the Kütahya finals. Hacettepe, with its highly successful performance in the final tournament held in Kütahya from April 21-26, 2009, not only advanced to the TB2L but also became champions, joining the Basketball Super League champions Efes Pilsen and TB2L champions Tofaş as the EBBL champions, becoming one of three teams to win the men's basketball league championship trophy in 2009.

Competing in the TB2L for the first time in the 2009-10 season, Hacettepe finished the regular season as the leader of Group A with 20 wins in 22 matches and qualified for the playoffs in first place. In the playoffs, Hacettepe qualified for the Final Four by defeating TED Ankara Kolejliler SK in the quarterfinals and Gelişim Koleji in both matches played in Yozgat and Istanbul, finishing third behind Trabzonspor and Eskişehirspor, narrowly missing out on promotion to the TBSL. The following season, Hacettepe University SK, which assembled another ambitious roster and brought in Alp Bayramoğlu as coach, qualified for the Final Four again after challenging Pertevniyal and Vestel series. In matches played in Istanbul and Eskişehir, Hacettepe defeated Konyaspor and Kepez Belediyespor, finishing second in the TB2L Final Group and advancing to the Basketball Super League.

Hacettepe University SK, which finished its first season in the Beko Basketball League in 12th place with 11 wins, enjoyed a successful season, remaining in the playoff race until the final weeks. Although starting from the next season, the university couldn't secure enough funds to sustain the team at high tiers and quickly relegated to regional league.

== Season by season ==
Season	Tier	League	Pos.	Postseason	Turkish Cup	European Competitions
1982–2008	Semi-Pro	Ankara Üniversiteler Ligi			–	-
2008–09	3	EBBL	1	Promoted	–	-
2009–10	2	TB2L	1	Final stage^{3rd}	–	-
2010–11	2	TB2L	2	Promoted^{2nd}	–	-
2011–12	1	TBL	12	–	Group Stage	-
2012–13	1	TBL	15	Relegated	Quarterfinalist	-
2013–14	2	TB2L	18	Relegated	–	-
2014–15	3	EBBL			–	-
2015–19	Semi-Pro	TÜSF Basketbol Ankara			–	-
2019-21	Semi-Pro	CBL Ankara			–	-
2021–	Semi-Pro	TÜSF Basketbol Ankara			–	-

== Super League Roster ==
Hacettepe Üniversitesi (2012-13) roster
Players
Coaches

Pos.	No.	Nat.	Name	Ht.	Wt.	Age
SG	4	(Turkey)	Adıgüzel, Özgür	1.92 m (6 ft 4 in)	90 kg (198 lb)	48 – 11 January 1977
PG	5	(United States)	Eldridge, Courtney	1.76 m (5 ft 9 in)	81.5 kg (180 lb)	45 – 10 June 1980
PG	6	(Turkey)	Altınmakas, Onur	1.89 m (6 ft 2 in)	87 kg (192 lb)	45 – 21 January 1980
PG	7	(Turkey)	Peker, Ulaş	1.91 m (6 ft 3 in)	85 kg (187 lb)	32 – 30 April 1993
C	12	(Turkey)	Beşok, Hüseyin (C)	2.11 m (6 ft 11 in)	120 kg (265 lb)	50 – 2 August 1975
PF	14	(United States)	Glover, Mike	2.01 m (6 ft 7 in)	97.5 kg (215 lb)	38 – 1 September 1987
PG	16	(United States)	Grundy, Anthony	1.91 m (6 ft 3 in)	84 kg (185 lb)	46 – 15 April 1979
PF	21	(United States)	Marsh, Ricardo	2.03 m (6 ft 8 in)	109 kg (240 lb)	44 – 12 September 1981
PF		(Turkey)	Kocaoğlu, Polat	2.06 m (6 ft 9 in)	105 kg (231 lb)	46 – 3 May 1979
C		(Turkey)	Özbakır, Nezih	2.07 m (6 ft 9 in)	102 kg (225 lb)	45 – 17 June 1980

Head coach

- (Turkey) Alp Bayramoğlu

Assistant coach(es)

- (Turkey) Burak Gören
- (Turkey) Gökhan Çörekçi
- (Turkey) Utku Sargül

Legend

- (C) Team captain
- Injured

- Roster

== Notable players ==
- (Turkey) Derya Yannier
- (Turkey) Hüseyin Beşok
- (Turkey) Murat Kaya
- (United States) Anthony Grundy
- (United States) Melvin Sanders
- (United Kingdom) Matthew Bryan-Amaning
