= TED Ankara Kolejliler =

- Leagues: TBL
- Founded: 1954; 72 years ago
- History: TED Ankara Kolejliler (1954–present)
- Arena: Ankara Arena; TOBB Sport Hall
- Capacity: 10,400; 2,000
- Location: Ankara, Turkey
- Team colors: Red, navy
- President: Z. Kerem Mağdenli
- Head coach: Mustafa Mavili
- Championships: 1 Turkish Basketball Cup
- Website: www.kolejliler.com
Home	Away

TED Ankara Kolejliler Spor Kulübü, more commonly known as TED Ankara Kolejliler is a professional basketball team from the city of Ankara in Turkey. Their home arena is the Ankara Arena with a capacity of 10,400 seats, which was opened in April 2010. The team currently competes in the Turkish Basketball First League (TBL), the second tier league of basketball in Turkey.

== History ==
The team played in Turkish Basketball League (now called BSL) between 1966-1977, 1979-1981, 1982-1983, 1984-1985, 1990-1995, 1996-1997, 1998-2003 and 2006-2009. The team promoted the Turkish Basketball League (now called BSL) from the TB2L in May 2012.

The team made its European club competitions debut at the Cup Winners' Cup in the 1973-74 season due to winning Turkish Basketball Cup in 1972-73. In the early nineties, it reached the Korac Cup qualifying rounds three times, from 1991-92 to 1993-94. Most recently, it reached the 2014 Eurocup quarterfinals.

== Sponsorship names ==
TED Ankara Kolejliler has had several denominations through the years due to its sponsorship;

- Kolej: 1966-1993
- Tiffany Tomato Kolejliler: 1993-1994
- Kolejliler: 1994-1996
- TED Kolej: 1996-1998
- Maydonoz Kolejliler: 1998-2001
- TED Kolej: 2001-2006
- CASA TED Kolejliler: 2006-2009
- Optimum TED Ankara Kolejliler: 2009-2012
- TED Ankara Kolejliler : 2012-13
- Aykon TED Ankara Kolejliler : 2013-2014
- Rönesans TED Ankara Kolejliler : 2014–2015
- Halk Enerji TED Ankara Kolejliler : 2018-present

== Players ==
=== Notable players ===
Note: Flags indicate national team eligibility at FIBA-sanctioned events. Players may hold other non-FIBA nationalities not displayed.

Criteria

To appear in this section a player must have either:

- Set a club record or won an individual award while at the club
- Played at least one official international match for their national team at any time
- Played at least one official NBA match at any time.

Turkey

- Rüştü Yüce
- Erdal Poyrazoğlu
- Barış Küce
- Aytek Gürkan
- Ömer Bozer
- Rahmi Özyar
- Murat Evliyaoğlu
- Victor Brejnoi
- Bekir Yarangüme
- Haluk Yıldırım
- Kerem Gönlüm
- Murat Evliyaoğlu
- Bahanur Şahin Gökalp
- Nedim Yücel
- Ömer Ünver
- Polat Kocaoğlu
- Serkan Erdoğan
- Tolga Tekinalp
- Tutku Açık

Montenegro

- Vladimir Golubović

New Zealand

- Kirk Penney

Puerto Rico

- Orlando Vega

Russia

- Elshad Gadashev

Slovenia

- Goran Jagodnik

Serbia* Jovo Stanojević

- Vanja Plisnić

Lithuania

- Martynas Gecevičius

United States ,

- Ashraf Amaya
- Ben Woodside
- Chuck Davis
- Clay Tucker
- Donald Little
- Erek Hansen
- Ivan McFarlin
- Marques Green
- {Matt Hill
- Melvin Robinson
- Michael Maddox
- Ronald Coleman
- Sylvester Gray
- Shannon Shorter

== Season by season ==
Season	Tier	League	Pos.	Turkish Cup	European competitions	
1972–73	1	TBL	3rd	Champion		
1991–92	1	TBL	5th		3 Korać Cup	R32
1992–93	1	TBL	3rd		3 Korać Cup	R64
1993–94	1	TBL	10th		3 Korać Cup	R32
2005–06	2	TB2L	2nd			
2006–07	1	TBL	6th			
2007–08	1	TBL	9th			
2008–09	1	TBL	16th			
2009–10	2	TB2L	8th			
2010–11	2	TB2L	5th			
2011–12	2	TB2L	1st			
2012–13	1	TBL	7th	Quarterfinalist		
2013–14	1	TBL	12th	Group stage	2 Eurocup	QF
2014–15	1	TBL	14th	Quarterfinalist		
2015–16	1	BSL	14th			
2016–17	1	BSL	16th			
2017–18	2	TBL	17th			
2018–19	3	TB2L	3rd			
2019–20	3	TB2L	3rd (Note: All Leagues in Turkey were cancelled due to the COVID-19 pandemic.)			
2020–21	3	TB2L	1st			
2021–22	2	TBL	8th			
2022–23	2	TBL	7th			
2023–24	2	TBL	8th			
2024–25	2	TBL	13th			

== Honours ==
=== International ===
- Eurocup:
  - Quarter-final (1): 2013–2014

=== Domestic ===
- Turkish Basketball Cup:
  - Winners (1): 1972-73
