= David Andersen =

Australian basketball player (born 1980)

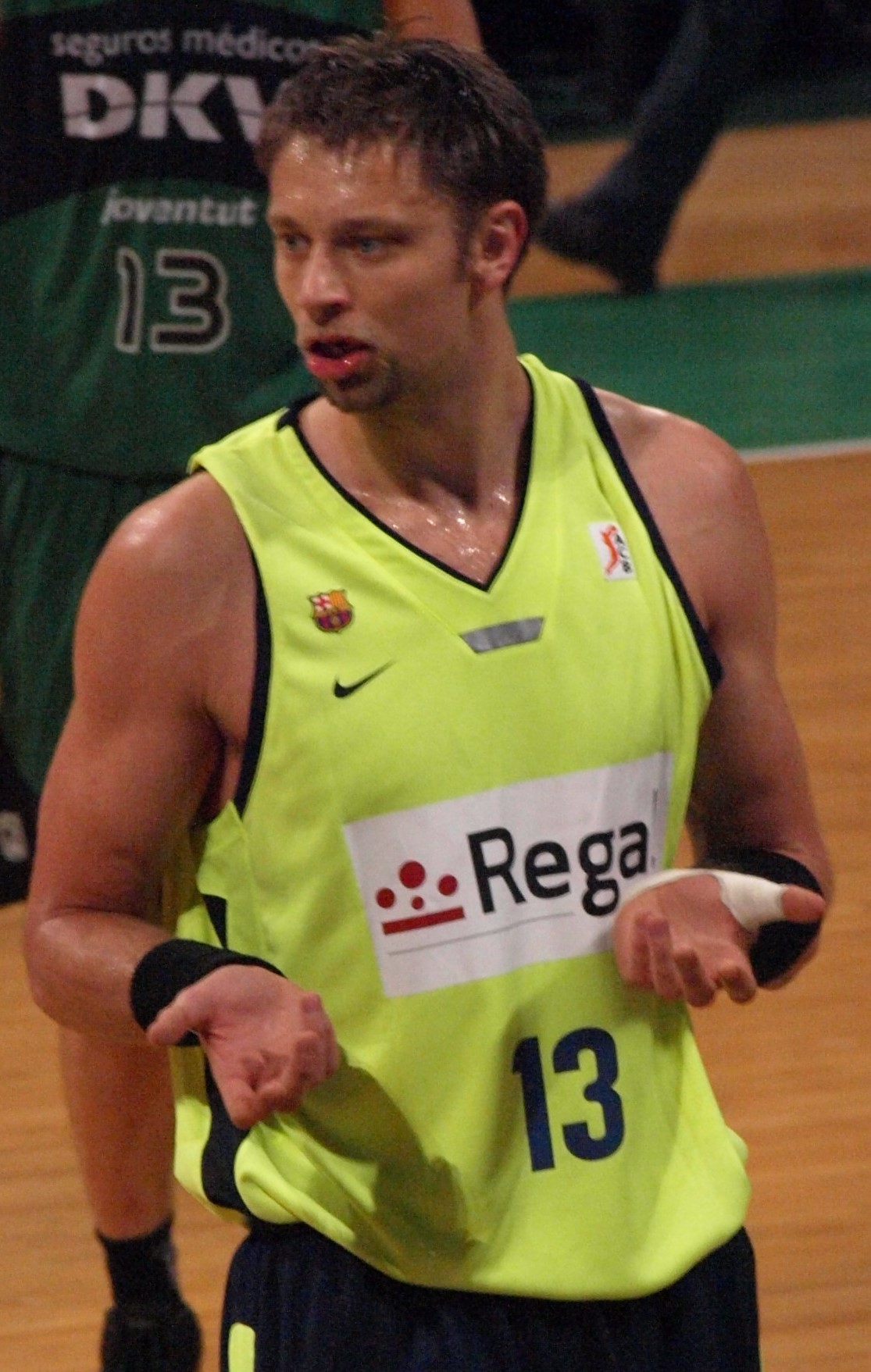
- Andersen with FC Barcelona in 2009

Personal information
- Born: 23 June 1980 (age 46) Melbourne, Victoria, Australia
- Listed height: 6 ft 11 in (2.11 m)
- Listed weight: 250 lb (113 kg)

Career information
- High school: Lake Ginninderra (Canberra, ACT)
- NBA draft: 2002: 2nd round, 37th overall pick
- Drafted by: Atlanta Hawks
- Playing career: 1995–2021
- Position: Power forward / centre

Career history
- 1995: Frankston Blues
- 1996–1998: Australian Institute of Sport
- 1998–1999: Wollongong Hawks
- 1999–2003: Virtus Bologna
- 2003–2004: Montepaschi Siena
- 2004–2008: CSKA Moscow
- 2008–2009: FC Barcelona
- 2009–2010: Houston Rockets
- 2010: Toronto Raptors
- 2010–2011: New Orleans Hornets
- 2011–2012: Montepaschi Siena
- 2012–2013: Fenerbahçe
- 2014: SIG Strasbourg
- 2014–2016: ASVEL
- 2016–2018: Melbourne United
- 2017: ASVEL
- 2018–2020: Illawarra Hawks
- 2019: SIG Strasbourg
- 2021: Frankston Blues
- 2021: Melbourne United

Career highlights
- 3× EuroLeague champion (2001, 2006, 2008); All-EuroLeague First Team (2005); 2× NBL champion (2018, 2021); Liga ACB champion (2009); 3× LBA champion (2001, 2004, 2012); 3× Italian Cup winner (2001, 2002, 2012); Italian Supercup winner (2011); LBA Finals MVP (2004); Italian Cup MVP (2012); 4× Russian League champion (2005–2008); 3× Russian Cup winner (2005–2007); Turkish Cup winner (2013); Turkish Cup Final MVP (2013); LNB Pro A champion (2016); LNB All-Star Game (2016); Albert Schweitzer Tournament MVP (1998)
- Stats at NBA.com
- Stats at Basketball Reference

David Emil Andersen (born 23 June 1980) is an Australian-Danish former professional basketball player. One of Australia's most experienced and successful players, Andersen won 12 league championships (9 European national domestic league championships and 3 EuroLeague championships) abroad and played in Italy, Russia, Spain, Turkey and France. He also played in the NBA, spending two years in the league between 2009 and 2011. In 2018 and 2021, he won championships with Melbourne United in the National Basketball League (NBL).

== Early life ==
Andersen was born in Melbourne, Victoria, in the suburb of Carlton, to parents Mary and Danny. He started playing basketball at Frankston East Primary School. His mother coached him and his brother, Stuart, at Frankston East and because there was only one team at the school. Andersen always played a year above his age.

At the age of 11, Andersen joined his local basketball association, the Frankston Blues, and in his first year at the club, the under 12 team he played in, won the championship. He played with the Frankston Blues Junior Program until he was 15 years old and then joined the Frankston Blues men's team, going on to play in the 1995 ABA National Final. After a successful Under 16 Australian Junior Championships with Victoria, Andersen was selected to join the Australian Institute of Sport (AIS) Basketball Development Program. He subsequently moved to Canberra and in conjunction with the AIS, he attended Lake Ginninderra Secondary College. A three-year scholarship holder, Andersen played for the AIS men's team in the South East Australian Basketball League (SEABL) from 1996 to 1998 where he was named the Australian Junior Male Basketballer of the Year in 1998.

== Professional career ==
=== Australia and Italy (1998–2004) ===
Following the conclusion of his time at the Australian Institute of Sport, Andersen signed a two-year deal with the Wollongong Hawks of the Australian National Basketball League. In 1998–99, he played 25 games while averaging 6.2 points and 4.0 rebounds per game.

In 1999, Andersen left Wollongong and signed a multi-year deal with Kinder Bologna of the Italian LBA. In the 2000–01 season, he helped Kinder Bologna win the Italian Cup, the LBA championship, and the EuroLeague 2000–01 season championship.

On 26 June 2002, Andersen was selected with the 37th overall pick in the 2002 NBA draft by the Atlanta Hawks. He returned to Kinder Bologna for the 2002–03 season, where he was named to the LBA All-Star Game for the first time.

In 2003, Andersen was forced to leave Bologna, after the club went into bankruptcy. He subsequently signed with Montepaschi Siena for the 2003–04 season, and went on to win the LBA Finals MVP award, after helping Montepaschi Siena win their first title. He also helped the club reach the EuroLeague Final Four, for the first time as well.

=== Russia (2004–2008) ===
In 2004, Andersen signed a two-year deal with CSKA Moscow, then of the Russian Basketball Super League. In his first season with CSKA, the team were crowned Russian League champions and Russian National Cup champions, along with also making the 2005 Final Four of the EuroLeague. Andersen was also named to the All-EuroLeague First Team of the 2004–05 season. In January of the 2005–06 season, Andersen dislocated his ankle and fractured his fibula, forcing him to return to Australia for surgery, specialist treatment and rehabilitation, before heading back to Russia to continue rehab and to support his team for their 2006 EuroLeague Final Four campaign. Andersen went on to re-sign with CSKA Moscow, and subsequently helped them win the 2007 and 2008 Russian Super League championships, as well as the 2008 EuroLeague championship.

=== Spain (2008–2009) ===
In June 2008, Andersen signed a three-year deal with FC Barcelona of the Spanish Liga ACB. Barcelona went on to win the 2008–09 ACB season championship.

=== NBA (2009–2011) ===
On 14 July 2009, the Atlanta Hawks traded Andersen's rights to the Houston Rockets in exchange for cash and future draft considerations. On 11 August 2009, he signed a multi-year deal with the Rockets.

Although being drafted in 2002, Andersen did not play in an NBA game until October 27, 2009, where he recorded 11 points and 5 rebounds in his debut against the Portland Trail Blazers. On 15 November 2009, he scored a career-high 19 points in a 101–91 win over the Los Angeles Lakers.

On 28 July 2010, Andersen was traded, along with cash considerations, to the Toronto Raptors in exchange for a 2015 protected second-round pick. On 20 November 2010, he was traded, along with Jarrett Jack and Marcus Banks, to the New Orleans Hornets in exchange for Jerryd Bayless and Peja Stojaković. On 2 February 2011, he scored a season-high 13 points in a 104–93 loss to the Oklahoma City Thunder.

Andersen's final NBA game was on April 1, 2011, in an 81–93 loss to the Memphis Grizzlies where he recorded 2 rebounds and 1 assist.

=== Return to Italy (2011–2012) ===
On 28 June 2011, Andersen signed a three-year deal with Montepaschi Siena, returning to the club for a second stint. On 19 December 2011, he was formally waived by the New Orleans Hornets following the conclusion of the NBA lockout.

=== Turkey (2012–2013) ===
In August 2012, Andersen and Montepaschi agreed on an €800,000 buyout, and he subsequently signed a two-year deal with Fenerbahçe of the Turkish Super League (BSL). On 12 June 2013, he parted ways with Fenerbahçe.

=== France and Australia (2014–2021) ===
On 22 January 2014, Andersen signed with SIG Strasbourg of the French LNB Pro A for the rest of the 2013–14 season.

On 11 September 2014, Andersen signed a two-year deal with ASVEL Basket of the LNB Pro A. He helped ASVEL win the championship for the 2015–16 season.

On 16 July 2016, Andersen signed a two-year deal with Melbourne United, returning to the NBL for the first time since 1999. For his return season in the NBL, he was named captain of United. In December and January of the 2016–17 season, he was sidelined for roughly six weeks with a knee injury. Following the NBL season, he returned to ASVEL Basket for the rest of the 2016–17 Pro A season.

In the 2017–18 NBL season, Andersen helped United win the championship with a 3–2 grand final series win over the Adelaide 36ers. At 37 years old, he became the oldest player to win his first NBL championship.

On 4 June 2018, Andersen signed with the Illawarra Hawks for the 2018–19 NBL season, returning to the franchise for a second stint, a full twenty years after his first. Following the NBL season, he joined SIG Strasbourg for the rest of the 2018–19 Pro A season, returning to the team for a second stint.

On 15 July 2019, Andersen re-signed with the Hawks for the 2019–20 season.

In April 2021, Andersen joined the Frankston Blues for the NBL1 South season.

On 8 May 2021, Andersen signed with Melbourne United as an injury replacement for Jack White. The following month, he won his second NBL championship after United defeated the Perth Wildcats 3–0 in the grand final series.

On 27 October 2021, Andersen announced his retirement from basketball after 23 professional seasons and 22 league/cup championships.

== National team career ==
Andersen has represented the national teams of Australia on many occasions. As a junior national team member in 1996 and in 1998, he played at the Albert Schweitzer Tournament, where he was voted the tournament MVP. In 1999, he travelled to Portugal with the Australian men's Under-19 team to play in the FIBA Under-19 World Championship for Junior Men, and then to Japan in 2001, for the FIBA Under-21 World Championship for Junior Men.

In the 2003 off-season, Andersen was selected to play for the Australian Boomers in the Olympic Qualifying FIBA Oceania Championship against New Zealand. The Boomers won the series, and secured a place in the 2004 Summer Olympics. He went on to play for Australia in Athens, where the Boomers finished in ninth place.

Andersen went on to win gold at the 2005 and 2007 FIBA Oceania Championships. He also represented Australia at both the 2008 Summer Olympics and the 2010 FIBA World Championship in Turkey.

With Andrew Bogut missing the 2012 London Olympics due to injury, Andersen became the Boomers' starting centre at the 2012 Summer Olympics. He was the Boomers' third-leading scorer, behind Patty Mills and Joe Ingles, and in six games, he had averages of 12 points, 6 rebounds, and 1.2 assists per game, and an impressive 40% three-point field goal percentage.

As a member of the Boomers' 2014 FIBA World Cup squad, Andersen averaged 6.3 points, 5.0 rebounds, and 1.2 assists in six games.

In 2016, Andersen made the Boomers Olympic team for the fourth straight time and he played at the 2016 Summer Olympics.

== Post-playing career ==
After announcing his retirement as a basketball player in October 2021, Andersen starting working for the NBL, taking care of Player Liaison and Special Projects.

== Career statistics ==
Legend
GP	Games played	GS	Games started	MPG	Minutes per game
FG%	Field-goal percentage	3P%	3-point field-goal percentage	FT%	Free-throw percentage
RPG	Rebounds per game	APG	Assists per game	SPG	Steals per game
BPG	Blocks per game	PPG	Points per game	PIR	Performance index rating
**Bold**	Career high

=== NBA ===
Year	Team	GP	GS	MPG	FG%	3P%	FT%	RPG	APG	SPG	BPG	PPG
2009–10	Houston	**63**	0	**14.1**	.432	.346	.687	**3.3**	**.7**	.2	.2	**5.8**
2010–11	Toronto	11	0	13.6	**.489**	.300	**1.000**	3.1	.6	**.3**	**.3**	5.1
2010–11	New Orleans	29	0	7.7	.446	**.385**	.467	1.7	.2	.1	.2	2.7
Career		103	0	12.3	.440	.347	.674	2.8	.6	.2	.2	4.9

=== EuroLeague ===
†	Denotes season in which Andersen won the EuroLeague
*	Led the league

Year	Team	GP	GS	MPG	FG%	3P%	FT%	RPG	APG	SPG	BPG	PPG	PIR
2000–01†	Bologna	22	7	18.1	.550	.250	.828	3.7	.5	.5	.5	7.3	8.5
2001–02	Bologna	22	11	21.5	.483	.000	.671	4.3	.4	**.9**	.2	8.7	9.3
2002–03	Bologna	8	5	24.4	.415	.000	.842	4.8	.6	.5	**.9**	8.8	10.1
2003–04	Mens Sana	21	8	20.0	.503	.000	.641	4.6	.7	.6	.3	9.1	9.1
2004–05	CSKA Moscow	23	**20**	24.1	**.573**	.000	.828	7.0	.8	.8	.5	12.4	17.7
2005–06†	CSKA Moscow	12	12	**28.1**	.512	.500	**.917**	**7.7**	1.1	.8	.2	**14.8**	**17.9**
2006–07	CSKA Moscow	**25**	6	22.4	.463	.486	.776	5.0	.9	.5	.4	9.8	11.0
2007–08†	CSKA Moscow	**25***	**20**	24.5	.463	**.510**	.847	5.8	**1.2**	.6	.4	12.8	14.7
2008–09	Barcelona	23*	9	21.0	.508	.404	.800	4.1	.8	.4	.6	11.1	11.2
2011–12	Mens Sana	20	19	25.7	.433	.333	.738	6.2	.9	.4	.4	11.7	11.9
2012–13	Fenerbahçe	23	15	20.2	.429	.342	.800	4.0	.4	.4	.1	7.3	6.6
Career		224	132	22.4	.491	.413	.788	5.1	.8	.6	.4	10.3	11.5

=== Domestic leagues ===
Season	Team	League	GP	MPG	FG%	3P%	FT%	RPG	APG	SPG	BPG	PPG
1998–99	Wollongong Hawks	Australia NBL	23	?	.452	--	.638	3.9	.7	.4	.6	6.2
1999–2000	Kinder Bologna	LBA	33	20.2	.593	.000	.692	4.1	.4	.8	.4	6.1
2000–01	Kinder Bologna	LBA	41	18.0	.578	.333	.725	4.3	.3	1.0	.3	8.3
2001–02	Kinder Bologna	LBA	43	21.5	.542	.000	.715	5.5	.4	1.0	.4	8.2
2002–03	Kinder Bologna	LBA	14	24.9	.525	.000	.754	5.3	.5	1.6	.4	10.7
2003–04	Montepaschi Siena	LBA	42	19.0	.537	.000	.738	4.8	.6	1.3	.5	8.8
2004–05	CSKA Moscow	Superleague A	29	22.2	.543	--	.791	7.7	1.0	.5	.4	13.6
2005–06	CSKA Moscow	Superleague A	14	24.1	.550	.000	.778	6.4	1.0	.2	.2	15.6
2006–07	CSKA Moscow	Superleague A	33	19.6	.566	.500	.708	3.9	1.0	.6	.5	11.0
2007–08	CSKA Moscow	Superleague A	26	18.0	.566	.548	.765	6.4	1.4	.7	.6	9.8
2008–09	FC Barcelona	ACB	40	22.3	.496	.385	.805	4.2	1.3	.5	.3	10.4
2011–12	Montepaschi Siena	LBA	38	24.0	.521	.429	.855	5.1	1.4	.4	.3	13.9
2012–13	Fenerbahçe	BSL	26	16.5	.480	.466	.886	2.9	.8	.2	.1	8.0
2013–14	SIG Strasbourg	LNB Pro A	25	27.0	.458	.468	.849	5.0	2.1	.6	.2	13.1
2014–15	ASVEL	LNB Pro A	32	19.8	.465	.349	.929	4.3	1.3	.3	.3	9.3
2015–16	ASVEL	LNB Pro A	45	23.8	.448	.411	.832	6.0	1.5	.4	.2	10.8

== Personal life ==
Andersen is of European heritage, with his father being Danish and his mother being English. He has dual Australian-Danish citizenship and holds a Danish passport.
