= Gašper Vidmar =

Slovenian basketball player

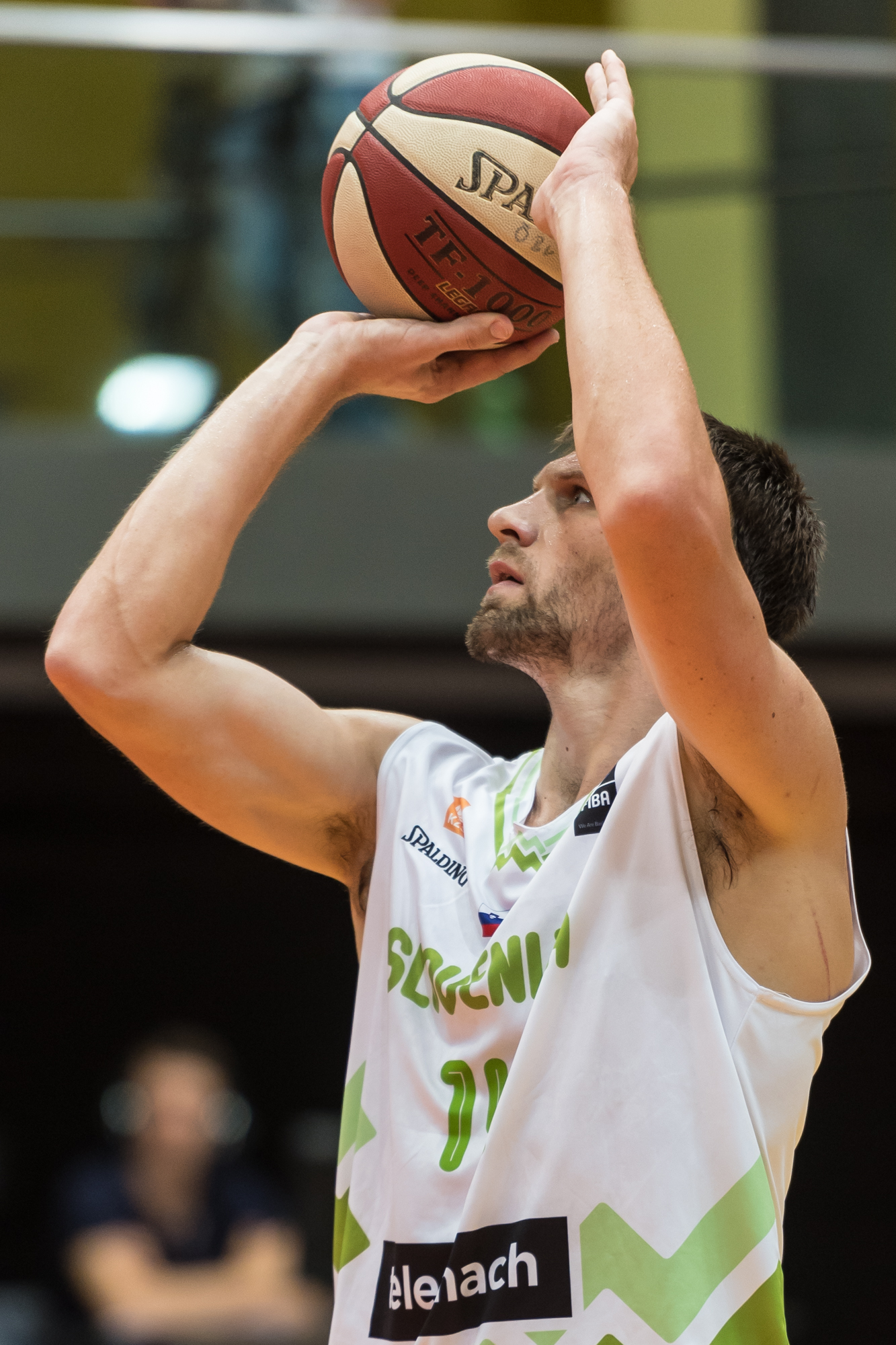
- Vidmar in 2016

Personal information
- Born: 14 September 1987 (age 39) Ljubljana, SR Slovenia, SFR Yugoslavia
- Listed height: 2.10 m (6 ft 11 in)
- Listed weight: 120 kg (265 lb)

Career information
- NBA draft: 2009: undrafted
- Playing career: 2003–2022
- Position: Center

Career history
- 2003–2005: Jance STZ
- 2005–2007: Geoplin Slovan
- 2007–2014: Fenerbahçe
- 2009–2010: →Union Olimpija
- 2012–2013: →Beşiktaş
- 2014–2015: Darüşşafaka
- 2015–2018: Banvit
- 2018–2021: Reyer Venezia

Career highlights
- BCL Star Lineup Second Best Team (2018); 4× Turkish League champion (2008, 2010, 2011, 2014); 2× Turkish Cup winner (2011, 2017); Italian League winner (2019); Italian Cup winner (2020); Turkish President's Cup winner (2013); Slovenian Supercup winner (2009); Slovenian Cup winner (2010); Slovenian Cup MVP (2010); Slovenian All-Star Game MVP (2009)
Medals
Men's basketball
Representing Slovenia
EuroBasket
Gold medal – first place	2017 Finland–Israel–Romania–Turkey
U20 European Championship
Bronze medal – third place	2006 Turkey	Team

Gašper Vidmar (born 14 September 1987) is a retired Slovenian professional basketball player. He is 6 ft 11 in (2.11 m) tall and plays the center position.

== Professional career ==
Vidmar played in youth categories of Geoplin Slovan in Slovenia. He made his professional debut with Jance STZ in the Slovenian minors during the 2003–04 season; in 2005, he returned to Slovan.

In 2007, Vidmar signed a multi-year deal with the Turkish club Fenerbahçe. On 8 September 2009, he was loaned to Union Olimpija of his native Slovenia for the 2009–10 season. On 2 April 2010 he returned to Fenerbahçe.

On 11 August 2012, he was loaned to Beşiktaş for the 2012–13 season.

For the 2013–14 season he returned to Fenerbahçe, but suffered a season-ending injury in early February 2014. In October 2014, he signed with Darüşşafaka for the 2014–15 season.

In July 2015, Vidmar joined the New Orleans Pelicans for the 2015 NBA Summer League. However, he didn't make the roster and signed with Banvit on 15 July 2015. He extended his contract by another two years on 28 June 2017.

On 3 October 2018 Vidmar signed a deal with Italian club Reyer Venezia.

On 15 January 2022 he announced his retirement from professional basketball.

== Slovenian national team ==
He was a Slovenia national team player and played over 100 times. He has been with national team in EuroBasket 2007, 2010 FIBA World Championship, and in EuroBasket 2017, when Slovenia came in 1st place.

== Career statistics ==
Legend
GP	Games played	GS	Games started	MPG	Minutes per game
FG%	Field-goal percentage	3P%	3-point field-goal percentage	FT%	Free-throw percentage
RPG	Rebounds per game	APG	Assists per game	SPG	Steals per game
BPG	Blocks per game	PPG	Points per game	PIR	Performance index rating
**Bold**	Career high

=== EuroLeague ===
Year	Team	GP	GS	MPG	FG%	3P%	FT%	RPG	APG	SPG	BPG	PPG	PIR
2007–08	Fenerbahçe	20	18	12.9	.538	—	.586	3.0	**.8**	.9	.3	5.2	5.4
2008–09	Fenerbahçe	16	12	14.8	.469	—	.364	3.8	.3	.8	.6	3.6	3.8
2009–10	Union Olimpija	10	9	16.5	.585	—	.409	3.1	.3	.4	.1	5.7	5.0
2010–11	Fenerbahçe	4	4	20.1	.579	—	**.571**	4.8	—	**1.5**	1.0	8.5	10.3
2011–12	Fenerbahçe	15	14	13.2	.574	.000	.389	2.6	.1	.4	.1	4.1	3.0
2012–13	Beşiktaş	**22**	**21**	**22.0**	**.597**	.000	.369	**5.1**	**.8**	.8	**1.1**	**9.1**	**10.7**
2013–14	Fenerbahçe	15	13	15.7	.596	.000	.417	4.3	.6	.3	.3	5.2	6.7
Career		102	91	16.3	.567	.000	.419	3.8	.5	.7	.5	5.8	6.3

=== EuroCup ===
Year	Team	GP	GS	MPG	FG%	3P%	FT%	RPG	APG	SPG	BPG	PPG	PIR
2015–16	Banvit	**18**	**17**	**22.2**	**.675**	—	.312	**6.0**	**.9**	**.7**	**.6**	**9.9**	**13.1**
2019–20	Reyer Venezia	15	3	12.8	.612	—	.349	3.3	**.9**	.4	.4	5.0	6.3
2020–21	Reyer Venezia	8	2	11.0	.600	—	**.769**	2.3	.3	.5	.4	4.3	4.8
Career		41	22	16.6	.650	—	.368	4.3	.8	.5	.5	7.0	9.0
