= Jamont Gordon =

American basketball player (born 1987)

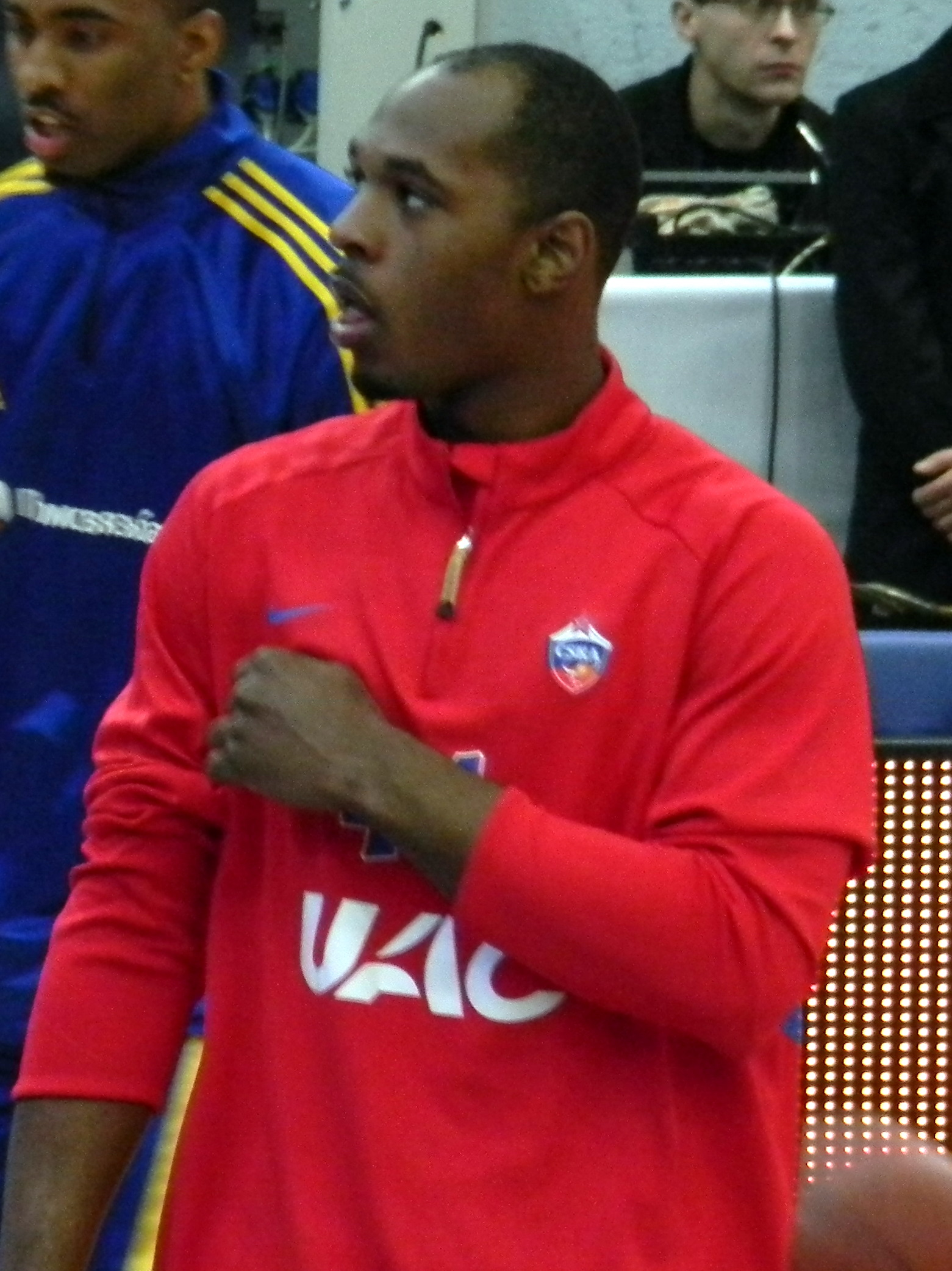
- Gordon at PBL All-Star Game in 2011

Personal information
- Born: March 16, 1987 (age 39) Nashville, Tennessee, U.S.
- Listed height: 6 ft 4 in (1.93 m)
- Listed weight: 225 lb (102 kg)

Career information
- High school: Oak Hill Academy (Mouth of Wilson, Virginia)
- College: Mississippi State (2005–2008)
- NBA draft: 2008: undrafted
- Playing career: 2008–2017
- Position: Point guard / shooting guard
- Number: 5, 44

Career history
- 2008–2009: Fortitudo Bologna
- 2009–2010: Cibona Zagreb
- 2010–2012: CSKA Moscow
- 2012–2014: Galatasaray Liv Hospital
- 2015: Tofaş
- 2017: Partizan

Career highlights
- Turkish League Finals MVP (2013); Turkish League champion (2013); VTB United League champion (2012); 2× Russian League champion (2011, 2012); Adriatic League Final Four MVP (2010); Croatian League champion (2010); Second-team Parade All-American (2005); Tennessee Mr. Basketball (2004)

Jamont Gordon (born March 16, 1987) is an American former professional basketball player. He played for the Mississippi State Bulldogs. At Glencliff Comprehensive High School, Gordon was named 2004 TSSAA class 3A Mr. Basketball. He plays the point guard and shooting guard positions.

== High school career ==
Jamont was heavily recruited coming out of high school, being rated as high as 16th in the nation by Rivals.com He was named a second-team Parade All-American while at the basketball elite Oak Hill Academy in Mouth of Wilson, Virginia after previously attending Glencliff Complex High School in Nashville, Tennessee. Jamont's college decision came down to the University of Tennessee and Mississippi State University.

== College career ==
In his freshman season, he paced the Mississippi State Bulldogs in both scoring (13.8 ppg) and assists (4.3 apg). In addition to being a Freshman All-American by various publications, he was also a unanimous All-SEC Freshman selection in 2006.

As a sophomore, Jamont became the starting point forward and led the team in scoring (16.0 ppg), rebounding (7.1 rpg) and assists (5.3). He was named to the AP All-SEC second team as well as the Coaches ALL-SEC first team.

After his sophomore season, Jamont declared for the 2007 NBA draft only to withdraw a week later. He was projected as an early second-round draft pick for the 2008 NBA draft. Gordon is unusually large for a point guard, standing 6 feet 4 inches, and weighing 225 lbs. His muscular build allows him to grab many more rebounds than the average point guard.

== Professional career ==
In 2008, he decided to forgo his senior season at MSU to enter the 2008 NBA draft.

On June 26, 2008, Gordon was not selected in the NBA draft. He joined the Philadelphia 76ers summer league team and hired Mike Conley, Sr. as his agent.

After his brief stint in the NBA, Gordon spent time playing for Fortitudo Bologna of the Italian League and KK Cibona of the Croatian Basketball League.

On July 19, 2010, he signed a three-year contract with CSKA Moscow.

In July 2012, he signed a two-year contract with Galatasaray Medical Park.

On January 22, 2015, he signed with Tofaş for the rest of the season.

On January 20, 2017, Gordon signed with Serbian club Partizan Belgrade for the rest of the season.

== Career statistics ==
Legend
GP	Games played	GS	Games started	MPG	Minutes per game
FG%	Field-goal percentage	3P%	3-point field-goal percentage	FT%	Free-throw percentage
RPG	Rebounds per game	APG	Assists per game	SPG	Steals per game
BPG	Blocks per game	PPG	Points per game	PIR	Performance index rating
**Bold**	Career high

=== Euroleague ===
Year	Team	GP	GS	MPG	FG%	3P%	FT%	RPG	APG	SPG	BPG	PPG	PIR
2009–10	Cibona	15	**14**	30.4	.431	.314	.731	**4.9**	3.8	**1.8**	**.9**	**13.9**	**16.1**
2010–11	CSKA Moscow	10	6	26.8	**.480**	.212	.684	4.8	3.7	.9	.6	13.1	15.9
2011–12	CSKA Moscow	**21**	5	17.9	.446	.348	.773	1.9	2.0	.8	.2	6.7	5.8
2013–14	Galatasaray	4	4	**34.2**	.341	**.389**	**.909**	4.3	**4.5**	.8	.0	11.3	14.0
Career		50	29	24.7	.439	.311	.739	3.6	3.1	1.1	.5	10.5	11.6
