= Kaya Peker =

Turkish basketball player (born 1980)

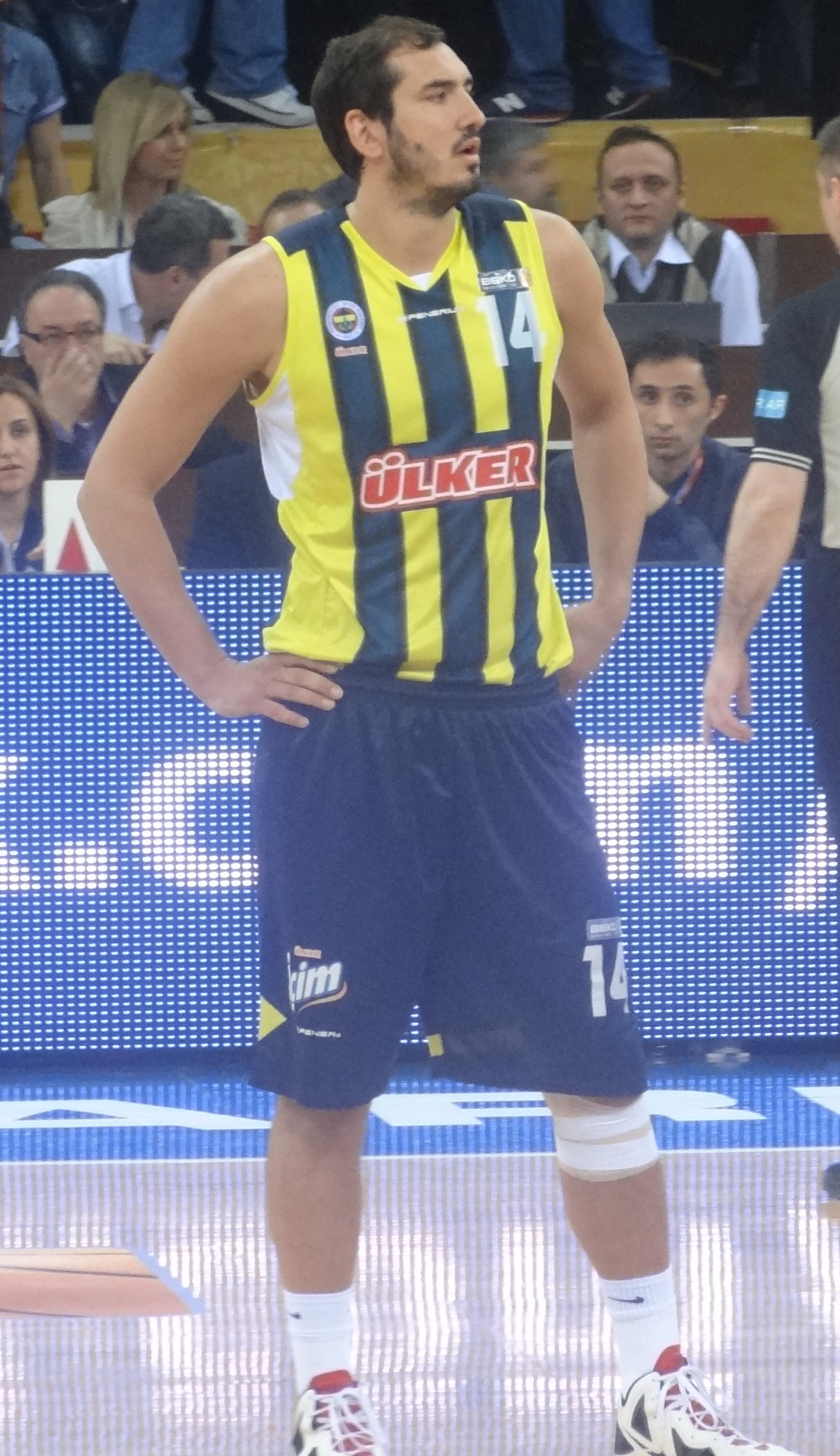
- Peker with Fenerbahçe in 2012

Personal information
- Born: August 2, 1980 (age 46) Ankara, Turkey
- Listed height: 6 ft 10 in (2.08 m)
- Listed weight: 245 lb (111 kg)

Career information
- NBA draft: 2002: undrafted
- Playing career: 1996–2019
- Position: Center
- Number: 14

Career history
- 1996–2000: Pınar Karşıyaka
- 2000–2006: Efes Pilsen
- 2006–2007: TAU Ceramica
- 2007–2008: Beşiktaş Cola Turka
- 2008–2010: Efes Pilsen
- 2010–2013: Fenerbahçe
- 2013–2014: Trabzonspor
- 2015–2017: Tofaş S.K.
- 2017–2019: Türk Telekom B.K.

Kaya Peker (born August 2, 1980) is a Turkish former professional basketball player. He played at the center position.

== Professional career ==
During his club career, Peker first played with the Turkish Super League clubs Pınar Karşıyaka and Efes Pilsen. He then played with the Spanish League club TAU Ceramica. After that, he played with the Turkish club Beşiktaş. He returned to his former team Efes Pilsen, where he played from 2008 to 2010. In the summer of 2010, he signed a contract with the Turkish club Fenerbahçe.

== National team career ==
Peker was also a regular member of the senior Turkish national team.

== Personal life ==
Peker was married to former the Croatian national volleyball team player Vesna Jelić. However, the couple were eventually divorced.
