= Nedim Yücel =

Turkish general manager and former professional basketball player

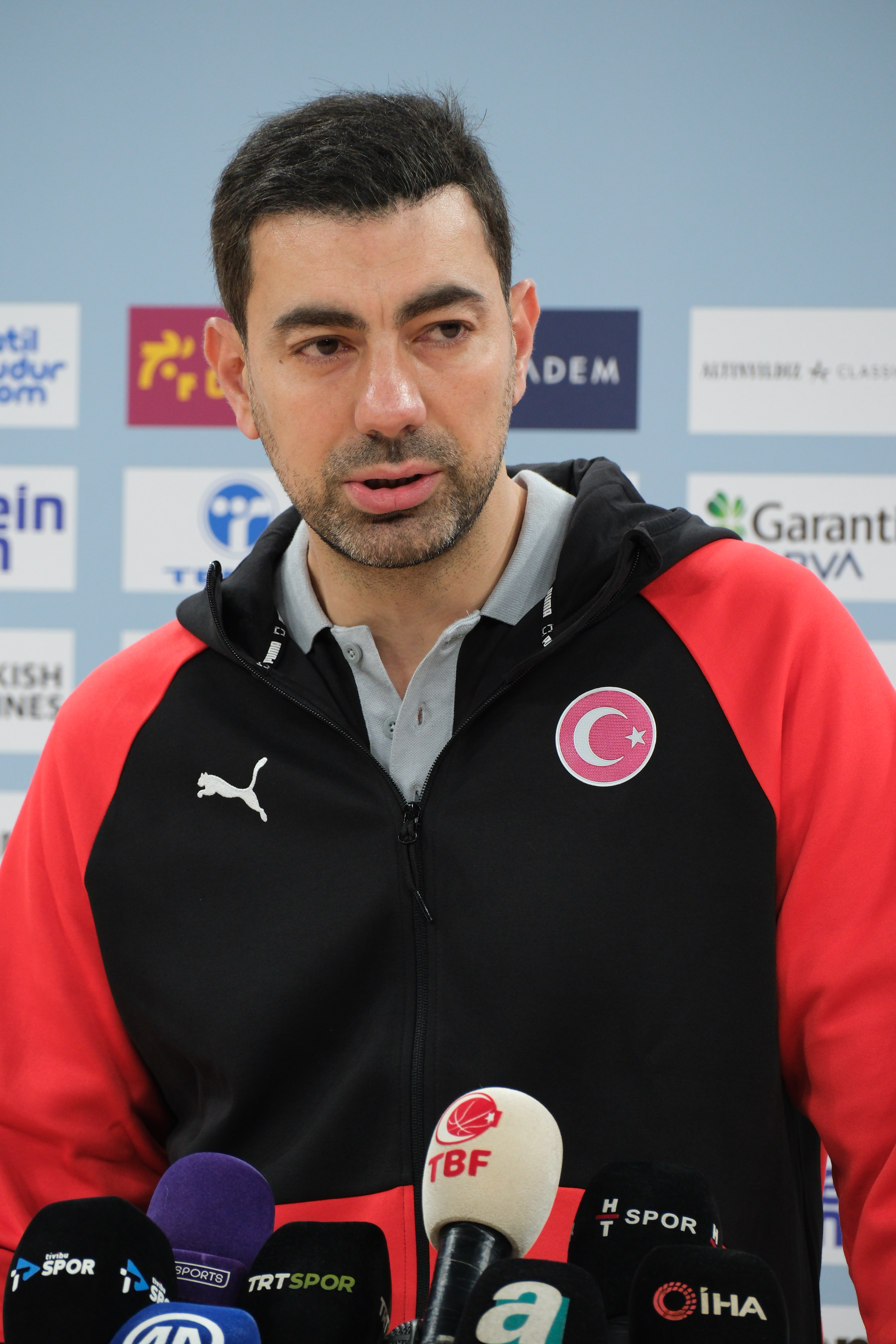

Beşiktaş Gain
- Title: General manager
- League: BSL

Personal information
- Born: April 22, 1979 (age 47) Istanbul, Turkey
- Listed height: 6 ft 8.5 in (2.04 m)
- Listed weight: 229 lb (104 kg)

Career information
- Playing career: 1997–2017
- Position: Power forward

Career history

Playing
- 1997–2006: Beşiktaş
- 2006–2007: Pınar Karşıyaka
- 2007–2008: Antalya BB
- 2008–2011: Mersin BB
- 2011–2012: Türk Telekom
- 2012–2013: TED Ankara Kolejliler
- 2013–2015: Darüşşafaka & Doğuş
- 2015–2016: Bahçeşehir Koleji S.K.
- 2016–2017: Bakırköy Basketbol

Coaching
- 2017–2023: Bursaspor Basketbol
- 2023–present: Beşiktaş

Nedim Yücel is a Turkish general manager and former professional basketball player. He is currently general manager of Beşiktaş Gain.

He studied at Anadolu University.
