= Bo McCalebb =

American-Macedonian basketball player

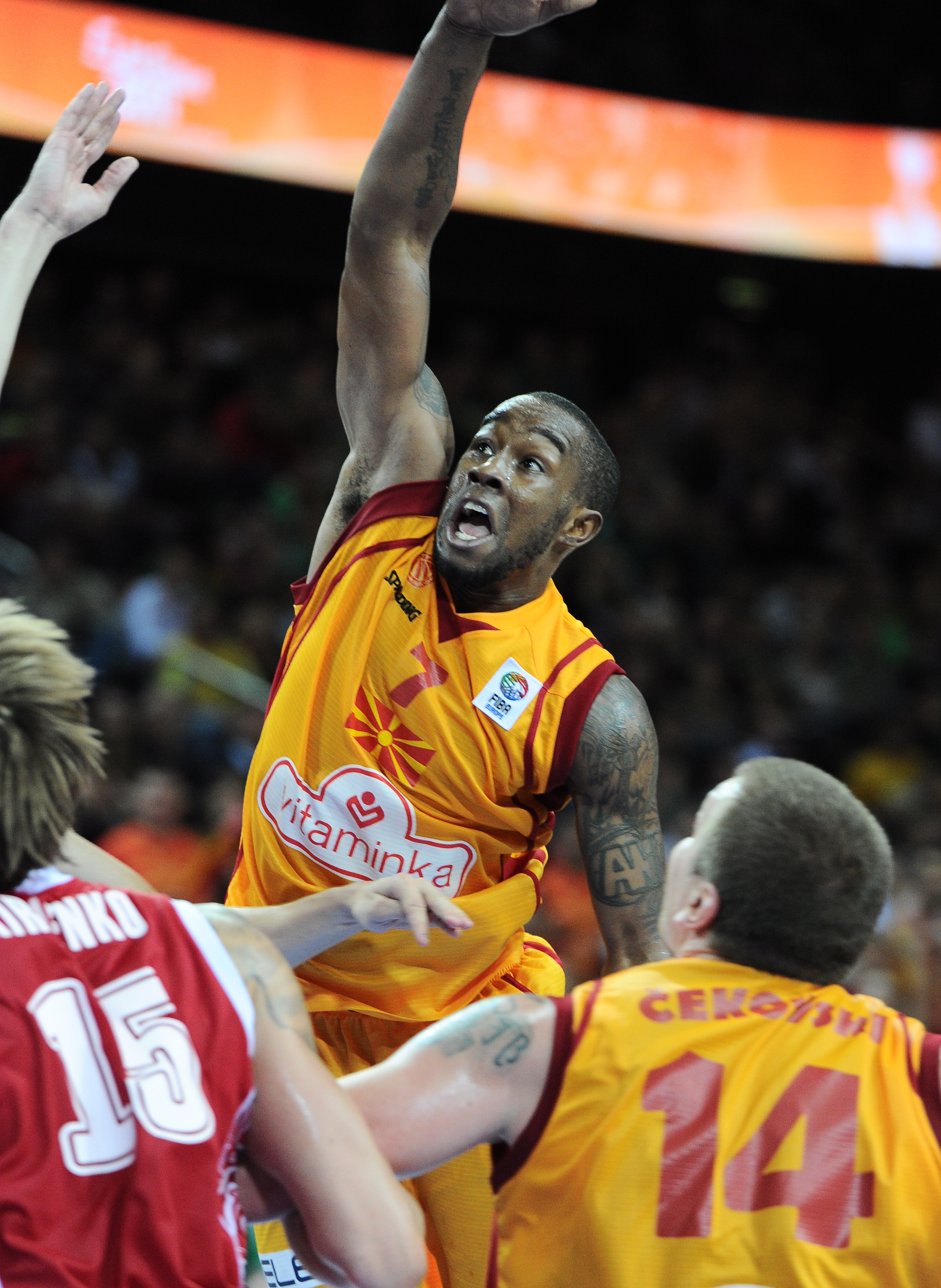
- McCalebb with Macedonia in 2011

Personal information
- Born: May 4, 1985 (age 41) New Orleans, Louisiana, U.S.
- Listed height: 6 ft 0 in (1.83 m)
- Listed weight: 183 lb (83 kg)

Career information
- High school: O. Perry Walker (New Orleans, Louisiana)
- College: New Orleans (2003–2008)
- NBA draft: 2008: undrafted
- Playing career: 2008–2019
- Position: Point guard

Career history
- 2008–2009: Mersin BB
- 2009–2010: Partizan
- 2010–2012: Montepaschi Siena
- 2012–2014: Fenerbahçe
- 2014–2015: Bayern Munich
- 2016: Limoges CSP
- 2016–2017: Gran Canaria
- 2017–2019: Zaragoza

Career highlights
- 2× All-EuroLeague Second Team (2010, 2012); Alphonso Ford EuroLeague Top Scorer Trophy (2012); 2× EuroLeague steals leader (2010, 2013); 2× Lega Serie A champion (2011, 2012); Turkish Super League champion (2014); ABA League champion (2010); Serbian League champion (2010); Serbian Cup winner (2010); Turkish Cup winner (2013); 2× Italian Cup winner (2011, 2012); Spanish Supercup winner (2016); 2× Italian Supercup winner (2010, 2011); Turkish Supercup winner (2013); Lega Serie A MVP (2012); 2× Lega Serie A Finals MVP (2011, 2012); Serbian League Playoffs MVP (2010); Italian Supercup MVP (2010); Sun Belt Player of the Year (2007); 3× First-team All-Sun Belt (2005, 2007, 2008)
- Stats at Basketball Reference

Lester "Bo" McCalebb (Macedonian: Лестер „Бо“ МекКејлеб; born May 4, 1985) is an American-born naturalized Macedonian former professional basketball player. He represented the senior Macedonian national team internationally. Standing at 1.83 m (6 ft 0 in), he played at the point guard position. Born and raised in New Orleans, he attended the University of New Orleans. A two-time All-EuroLeague selection, McCalebb was part of the All-Tournament Team at EuroBasket 2011.

== High school ==
McCalebb attended O. Perry Walker High School in New Orleans, Louisiana, where he played high school basketball.

== College career ==
McCalebb played college basketball at the University of New Orleans. McCalebb was named the Sun Belt Conference Player of the Year in 2007. In his five-year career with the Privateers, he played in 128 games, averaging 20.9 points, 4.7 rebounds, and 3 assists per game.

== Professional career ==
=== Mersin BB ===
McCalebb started his professional career in Turkey with Mersin Büyükşehir Belediyesi. He had a lot of success in Mersin, averaging 17.4 points and 4.7 assists per game during the 2008–09 season. He was also the Turkish Super League leader in steals, with 2.7 per game.

=== Partizan ===
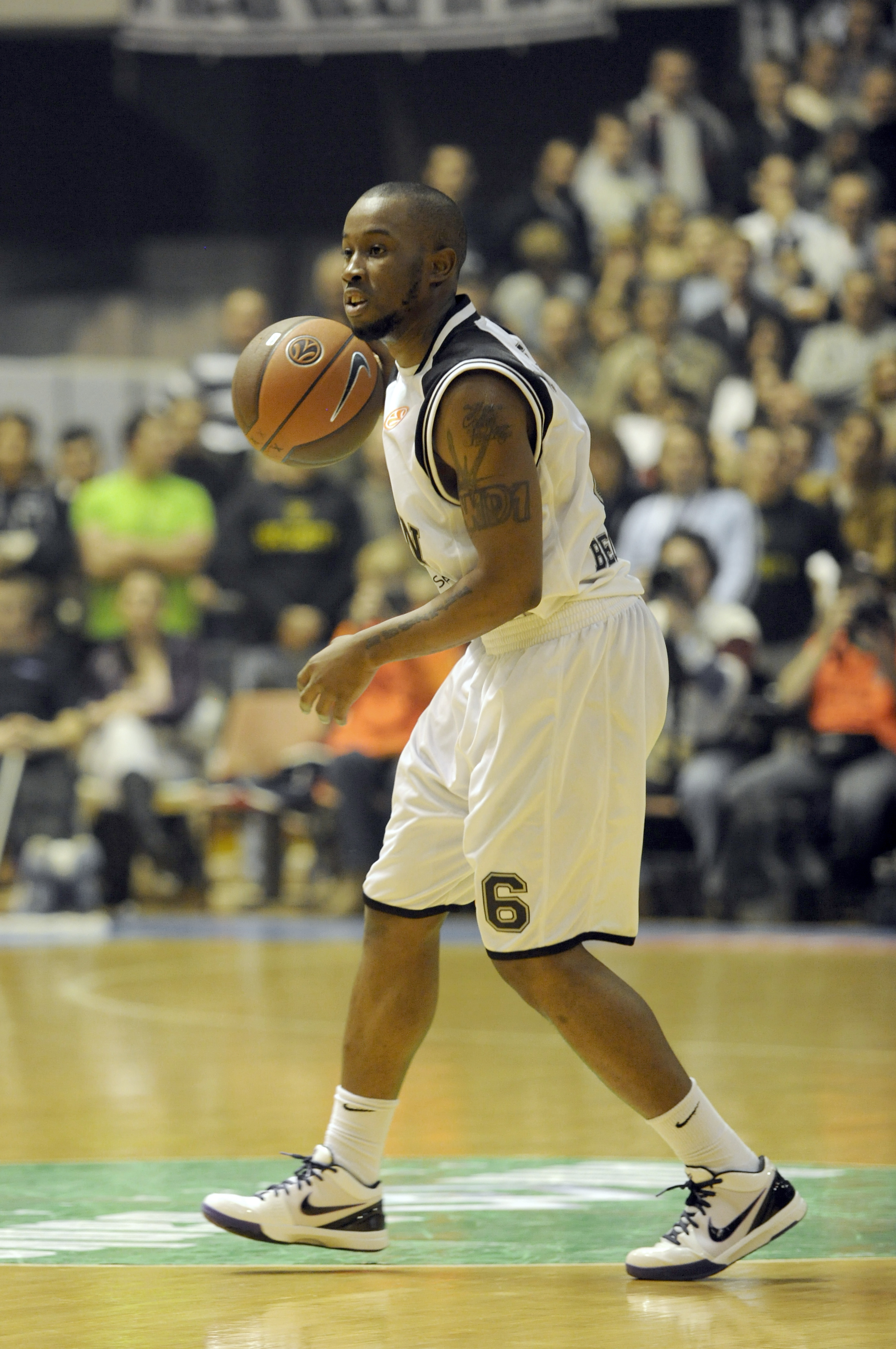
McCalebb with Partizan in 2009

On October 16, 2009, McCalebb signed a one-year contract with the Serbian club Partizan Belgrade, a week after the team released former point guard Milt Palacio for failure to join the team on time. He had an amazing season with Partizan winning the regional ABA League, Basketball League of Serbia and Cup titles. He also helped the team to reach the EuroLeague Final Four, and earned an All-EuroLeague Second Team selection.

=== Montepaschi Siena ===
In July 2010, McCalebb signed a three-year deal with the Italian club Montepaschi Siena. In his first season in Italy, he had even more success, helping his team to the EuroLeague Final Four, and winning the Italian League, Cup, and Supercup. In 2012, he was named the Italian League MVP. In April 2012, McCalebb won the EuroLeague's Alphonso Ford Trophy, the annual award given to the EuroLeague's top scorer of the season. He averaged 16.9 points, 2.6 assists, and 2.2 rebounds per game, during the season, while shooting .613 from the field and .526 on three-pointers. He also earned a selection to the All-EuroLeague Second Team, for the second time in his career.

=== Fenerbahçe Ülker ===
During the summer of 2012, San Antonio Spurs were interested in signing McCalebb, but they did not reach a buyout agreement with Montepaschi Siena. In August 2012, McCalebb signed a three-year contract with the Turkish club Fenerbahçe Ülker. In June 2014, he left Fenerbahçe and became a free agent.

=== Bayern Munich ===
On November 19, 2014, McCalebb signed a one-month deal with the German club Bayern Munich. Over 5 regular season EuroLeague games he played for the team, he averaged 9.8 points, and a career-high 3.6 assists per game. On December 26, 2014, he extended his contract with the club until the end of January 2015. On January 10, 2015, he tore ligaments in one of his thumbs, which sidelined him off the court for several weeks. After the injury, he never played with Bayern again.

=== Pelicans / Limoges ===
On October 15, 2015, McCalebb signed with the NBA's New Orleans Pelicans. However, he was later waived by the Pelicans on October 24, after appearing in four preseason games. On January 3, 2016, McCalebb signed with French club Limoges, for the rest of the season.

=== Gran Canaria ===
On August 24, 2016, McCalebb signed with Herbalife Gran Canaria of the Spanish Liga ACB and the EuroCup.

=== Zaragoza ===
On December 13, 2017, McCalebb signed with Spanish club Tecnyconta Zaragoza for the rest of the 2017–18 ACB season.

== National team career ==
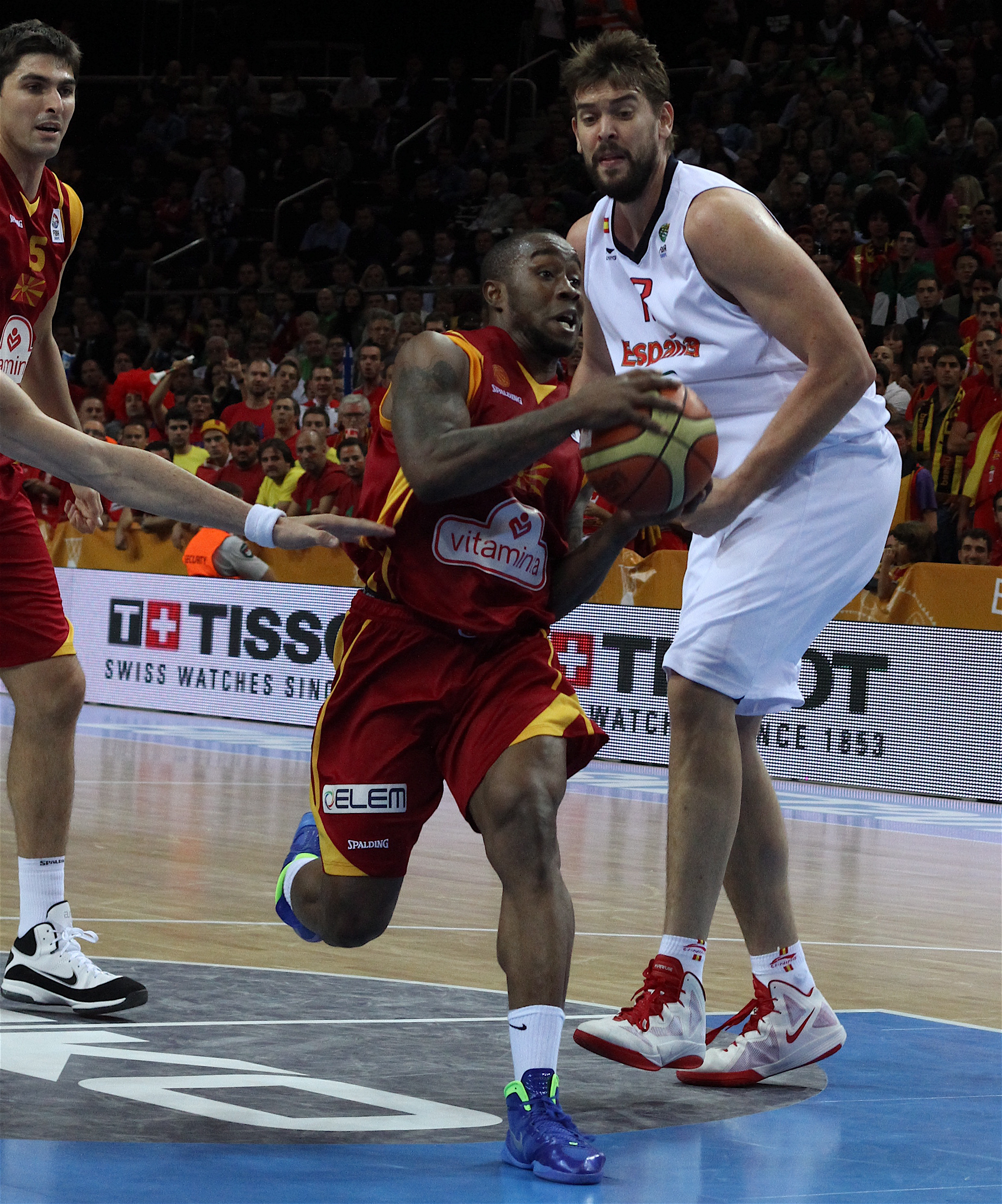
McCalebb with Macedonia in 2011

In 2010, McCalebb accepted an offer to play for the senior men's Macedonian national basketball team, after which he received a Macedonian passport. The "Macedonian MVP" was the second leading scorer in the qualifying for the EuroBasket 2011, with a strong showing against Great Britain, and its NBA star Luol Deng.

=== EuroBasket 2011 ===
On August 31, in the first tournament game for Macedonia, McCalebb scored 17 points in an overtime loss against Montenegro. On September 1, Macedonia played Croatia with McCalebb scoring 19 points. He had another strong showing versus Greece on September 3, scoring game-high 27 points and leading the team to a 72–58 win. On September 4, McCalebb scored 18 points against Finland in a 72–70 win. On September 5, McCalebb scored 22 points in a 75–63 win over Bosnia and Herzegovina, which qualified them to the second phase as the first place team in Group C. Then, on September 8 (Macedonia Independence Day), he led the team with 27 points in their 65–63 win over Georgia and thus placed Macedonia to the quarter-finals. In the last two games of the second phase, McCalebb scored 19 points in Macedonian victory against Slovenia, and 16 points in the dramatic loss against Russia. On September 14, Macedonia defeated the host nation Lithuania to qualify to the semi-finals. McCalebb scored 23 points. In the semi-finals Macedonia was defeated 92–80 by Spain, with McCalebb scoring 25 points. In the bronze medal battle, McCalebb scored 22 points, but Macedonia was defeated by Russia, in another dramatic game, 72–68.

McCalebb earned an All-Tournament Team selection. During the tournament, he averaged 21.4 points, 3.1 rebounds, and 3.7 assists per game, in 34.2 minutes played per game. With 235 total points scored, McCalebb was the best scorer of the tournament in total points, but in points per game average, he was second behind Tony Parker, who played in one game less.

== Career statistics ==
Legend
| GP | Games played | GS | Games started | MPG | Minutes per game |
| FG% | Field-goal percentage | 3P% | 3-point field-goal percentage | FT% | Free-throw percentage |
| RPG | Rebounds per game | APG | Assists per game | SPG | Steals per game |
| BPG | Blocks per game | PPG | Points per game | PIR | Performance index rating |
| **Bold** | Career high |

=== EuroLeague ===
| * | Led the league |

| Year | Team | GP | GS | MPG | FG% | 3P% | FT% | RPG | APG | SPG | BPG | PPG | PIR |
|---|---|---|---|---|---|---|---|---|---|---|---|---|---|
| 2009–10 | Partizan | 22* | **22*** | **30.1** | .457 | .232 | .759 | 2.9 | 3.4 | **2.0*** | — | 13.4 | 12.7 |
| 2010–11 | Mens Sana | 15 | 9 | 20.8 | .549 | .438 | **.880** | 2.0 | 2.1 | 1.8 | — | 11.5 | 13.1 |
| 2011–12 | Mens Sana | 17 | 17 | 27.7 | **.613** | **.526*** | .809 | 2.2 | 2.6 | 1.3 | — | **16.9*** | **17.3** |
| 2012–13 | Fenerbahçe | 23 | 20 | 27.6 | .481 | .255 | .847 | 2.7 | 2.4 | 1.9* | — | 13.0 | 13.2 |
| 2013–14 | Fenerbahçe | **24** | 15 | 27.0 | .595 | .359 | .741 | **3.2** | 2.5 | 1.4 | **.1** | 11.9 | 14.1 |
| 2014–15 | Bayern Munich | 5 | 5 | 23.4 | .345 | .357 | .833 | 2.4 | **3.6** | .6 | — | 9.8 | 6.0 |
| Career | | 106 | 88 | 26.8 | .521 | .336 | .798 | 2.7 | 2.7 | 1.6 | .0 | 13.1 | 13.5 |

=== Other leagues ===
| Season | Team | League | GP | MPG | FG% | 3PT FG% | FT% | RPG | APG | SPG | BPG | PPG |
|---|---|---|---|---|---|---|---|---|---|---|---|---|
| 2008–09 | Mersin B.B. | BSL | 30 | 33.9 | .584 | .303 | .729 | 3.3 | 4.6 | 2.7 | .1 | 17.4 |
| 2009–10 | Partizan NIS | ABA | 26 | 24.6 | .541 | .296 | .759 | 2.6 | 2.8 | 2.2 | .1 | 12.1 |
| 2009–10 | Partizan NIS | KLS | 17 | 22.8 | .667 | .219 | .853 | 3.0 | 3.4 | 2.1 | .0 | 14.3 |
| 2010–11 | Montepaschi Siena | LBA | 32 | 23.3 | .660 | .391 | .816 | 2.8 | 2.8 | 2.4 | .1 | 13.2 |
| 2011–12 | Montepaschi Siena | LBA | 43 | 26.0 | .630 | .390 | .780 | 2.8 | 3.4 | 1.3 | .1 | 14.2 |
| 2012–13 | Fenerbahçe Ulker | BSL | 25 | 24.6 | .557 | .359 | .812 | 2.6 | 3.2 | 1.6 | .0 | 13.3 |
| 2013–14 | Fenerbahçe Ulker | BSL | 40 | 22.5 | .624 | .309 | .756 | 2.5 | 3.4 | 1.3 | .1 | 10.4 |
| 2014–15 | Bayern Munich | BBL | 8 | 26.6 | .667 | .368 | .800 | 2.3 | 5.6 | 1.1 | .0 | 13.6 |

=== College ===
| Year | Team | GP | GS | MPG | FG% | 3P% | FT% | RPG | APG | SPG | BPG | PPG |
|---|---|---|---|---|---|---|---|---|---|---|---|---|
| 2003–04 | New Orleans | 31 | 15 | 26.1 | .441 | .311 | .606 | 3.5 | 2.0 | 1.4 | .1 | 13.1 |
| 2004–05 | New Orleans | 30 | 30 | **34.9** | .480 | .260 | .567 | 4.3 | **3.7** | 1.8 | .2 | 22.6 |
| 2005–06 | New Orleans | 4 | 4 | 33.3 | .379 | .300 | .657 | 2.5 | 1.5 | **3.8** | **.5** | 19.0 |
| 2006–07 | New Orleans | 31 | 31 | 34.5 | .478 | .333 | .710 | **6.8** | 3.3 | 2.0 | .2 | **25.0** |
| 2007–08 | New Orleans | **32** | **32** | 33.3 | **.506** | **.405** | **.772** | 4.5 | 3.1 | 2.4 | .1 | 23.2 |
| Career | | 128 | 112 | 32.2 | .476 | .333 | .667 | 4.7 | 3.0 | 2.0 | .1 | 20.9 |

== See also ==
- List of NCAA Division I men's basketball career scoring leaders
