= Devin Smith (basketball) =

American basketball player (born 1983)

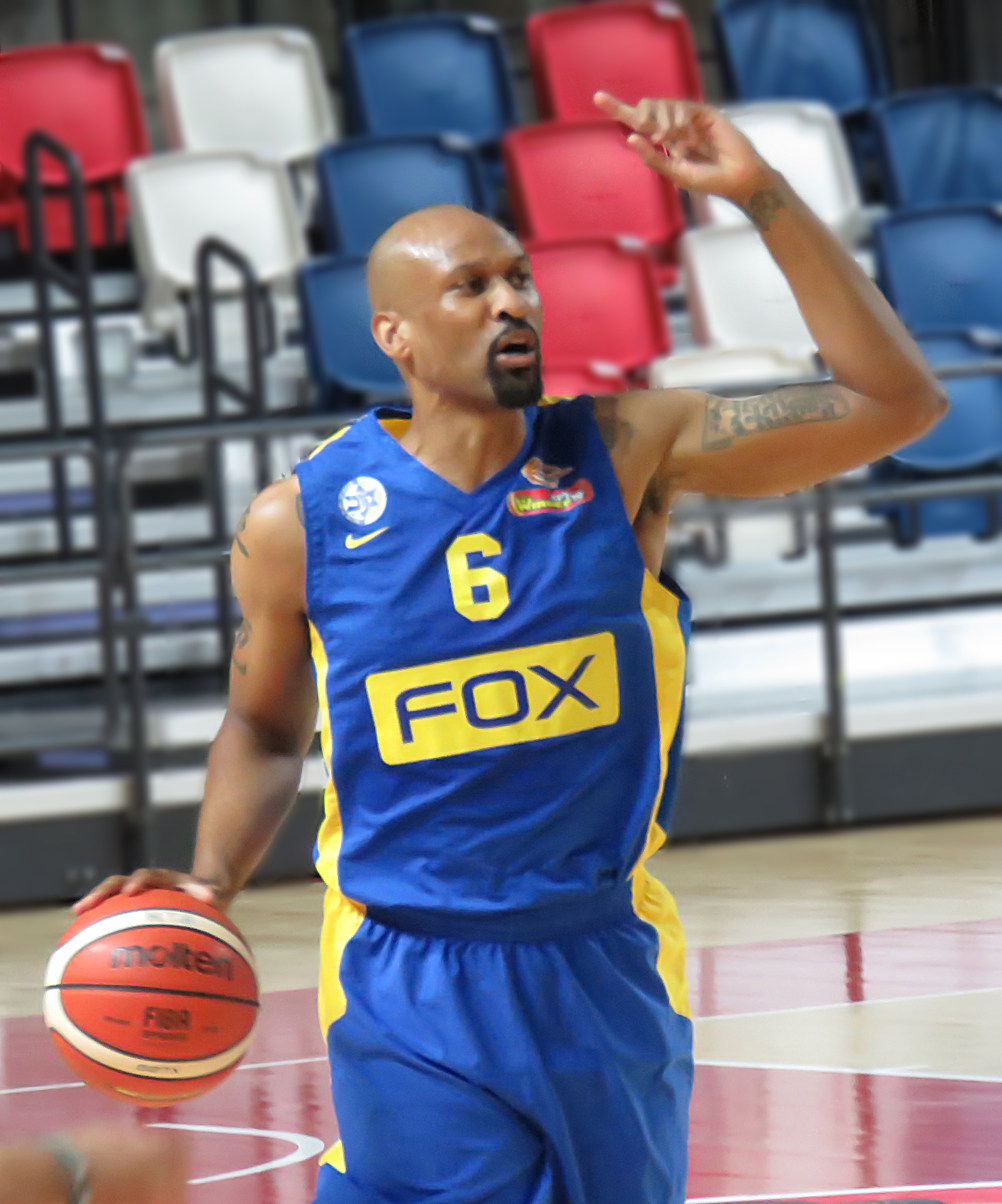
- Smith with Maccabi Tel Aviv in 2015

Personal information
- Born: April 12, 1983 (age 43) New Castle, Delaware, U.S.
- Listed height: 6 ft 6 in (1.98 m)
- Listed weight: 235 lb (107 kg)

Career information
- High school: William Penn (New Castle, Delaware)
- College: Coffeyville CC (2001–2002); Virginia (2002–2005)
- NBA draft: 2005: undrafted
- Playing career: 2005–2017
- Position: Small forward
- Number: 6, 7, 9, 32, 33
- Coaching career: 2018–present

Career history

Playing
- 2005–2007: San Sebastián Gipuzkoa
- 2007–2008: Air Avellino
- 2008–2009: Fenerbahçe Ülker
- 2009–2010: Panellinios
- 2010–2011: Benetton Treviso
- 2011–2017: Maccabi Tel Aviv

Coaching
- 2018–2019: Phoenix Suns (player development)
- 2019–2023: Iowa Wolves (assistant)
- 2023–2024: Capital City Go-Go (assistant)

Career highlights
- All-EuroLeague Second Team (2015); EuroLeague champion (2014); Adriatic League champion (2012); 2× Israeli Super League champion (2012, 2014); 6× Israeli State Cup winner (2012–2017); 2x Israeli Super League Quintet (2013, 2015); Israeli League Cup MVP (2015); 2× All-EuroCup First Team (2010, 2011); Italian Cup MVP (2008); Italian Cup winner (2008); Spanish 2nd League champion (2006)

Devin Michael Smith (born April 12, 1983) is an American former professional basketball player. Standing at a height of 6 ft 6 in (1.98 m), he played mainly at the small forward position, and he was an All-EuroLeague Second Team selection in 2015.

== Early life ==
Smith attended William Penn High School, in New Castle, Delaware, Delaware, where he played high school basketball.

== College career ==
After playing high school basketball, Smith played college basketball at Coffeyville Community College, with the Coffeyville Red Ravens (NJCAA), in the 2001–02 season. He then played at the University of Virginia, with the Virginia Cavaliers (NCAA Division I), from 2002 to 2005.

== Professional career ==
=== Early years ===
After going undrafted in the 2005 NBA draft, Smith signed a contract with the Spanish team Bruesa GBC. With them, he won the LEB Oro, the 2nd-tier Spanish League in 2006. He stayed in the club for two seasons, before moving to the Italian team Air Avellino in the summer of 2007. With them, he won the Italian Cup in 2008 and was named the MVP of the Italian Cup.

After breakthrough season, in the summer of 2008, he signed a contract with the Turkish team Fenerbahçe Ülker. With them, he played in the EuroLeague for the first time in his career. Over 14 games in the EuroLeague, he averaged 7.9 points and 3.4 rebounds per game. However, they went short of all the trophies and Smith didn't extend his contract with the team.

In 2010, he signed with the Greek team Panellinios where he stayed for one season.

=== Benetton Treviso ===
On July 22, 2010, Smith signed a one-year deal with Italian team Benetton Treviso. Over the season, he averaged 15.1 points and 5.1 rebounds per game in the EuroCup, and 13.7 points and 4.8 rebounds in the Italian League. He was also named to the All-EuroCup First Team for the performances he showed over the season. This was his second consecutive nomination, after also being selected the season before while playing for Panellinios.

=== Maccabi Tel Aviv ===
On June 23, 2011, Smith signed a two-year deal with the Israeli team Maccabi Tel Aviv.

On April 1, 2013, he was named the EuroLeague MVP of the month of March, his first such monthly award. Over the month, he helped his team win 4 straight games after having 2–5 score in its Top 16 group. He averaged 15.3 points, 6.5 rebounds and 2 steals per game. He had statistically the best season since coming in the club, having the averages of 11.5 points, 4 rebounds and 1.6 assists over 25 EuroLeague games played. Maccabi however went short of all the trophies.

On June 26, 2013, he signed a new two-year contract with Maccabi. With the first half of the season ended, team's performances showed very little hope that the season would be better than the previous. However, Maccabi finished the season by winning the triple crown. Maccabi eventually won its sixth EuroLeague championship, Smith's first, by defeating Real Madrid in an overtime 98–86 finals game. Smith was one of the key Maccabi players, averaging 9.9 points and career-high 5.6 rebounds with career-high shooting percentages.

In the summer of 2014, Maccabi's roster changed dramatically with the departure of head coach David Blatt, and some key players from the previous season like David Blu, Tyrese Rice, Ricky Hickman and Joe Ingles. His role in the team as being one of the best and most experienced players was left unchanged, as he had many touches. He was named the EuroLeague MVP of the month of December, his second monthly MVP award. Over the month of December, he averaged 20.7 points, 6.7 rebounds, 4 assists and 2 steals per game. Maccabi was eventually stopped in the quarter-final series, after being swept by Fenerbahçe Ülker. In May 2015, he was chosen to the All-EuroLeague Second Team for the performances he put up over the season. He had his best season since coming into the club, averaging all career-highs of 15 points, 6.1 rebounds, 2.5 assists, and 1 steal, over 25 games in the EuroLeague.

On April 7, 2015, he signed a new three-year contract with Maccabi.

On September 27, 2017, after 6 seasons with Maccabi, Smith announced his retirement from playing professional basketball.

== Coaching career ==
On June 11, 2018, Smith would join Jason Staudt as new assistant coaches for the Phoenix Suns under new head coach Igor Kokoškov's staff. However, after putting up a 19–63 record with the Suns, Smith was fired alongside the rest of the team's coaching staff on April 23, 2019.

On October 13, 2023, Smith was hired as an assistant coach by the Capital City Go-Go of the NBA G League.

== Career statistics ==
Legend
GP	Games played	GS	Games started	MPG	Minutes per game
FG%	Field-goal percentage	3P%	3-point field-goal percentage	FT%	Free-throw percentage
RPG	Rebounds per game	APG	Assists per game	SPG	Steals per game
BPG	Blocks per game	PPG	Points per game	PIR	Performance index rating
**Bold**	Career high

=== EuroLeague ===
†	Denotes seasons in which Smith won the EuroLeague

Year	Team	GP	GS	MPG	FG%	3P%	FT%	RPG	APG	SPG	BPG	PPG	PIR
2008–09	Fenerbahçe	14	3	24.5	.411	.234	.667	3.4	1.0	.5	.6	7.9	5.6
2011–12	Maccabi	21	19	27.0	.419	.286	.857	4.8	.8	.6	.6	8.3	8.6
2012–13	Maccabi	25	24	28.5	.436	.377	.844	4.0	1.6	.7	**.7**	11.5	10.5
2013–14†	Maccabi	**28**	**27**	28.0	**.498**	.411	.853	5.6	1.0	.5	.5	9.9	10.8
2014–15	Maccabi	25	25	**31.8**	.458	.376	.833	**6.1**	**2.5**	**1.0**	.6	**15.0**	**16.1**
2015–16	Maccabi	9	9	30.1	.420	**.413**	.750	5.4	1.9	.6	.1	12.7	11.1
2016–17	Maccabi	**28**	24	26.1	.455	.352	**.958**	5.4	1.6	.6	.4	9.2	9.1
Career		150	131	28.0	.440	.359	.833	5.1	1.5	.7	.5	10.6	10.6

=== Domestic leagues ===
Season	Team	League	GP	MPG	FG%	3P%	FT%	RPG	APG	SPG	BPG	PPG
2005–06	(Spain) Bruesa	LEB Oro	**39**	**32.1**	.526	.322	.664	5.9	1.2	.9	.6	16.2
2006–07	(Spain) Bruesa	ACB	32	29.4	.482	.340	.702	3.8	1.3	1.0	.3	11.9
2007–08	(Italy) Avellino	LBA	**39**	29.0	.525	.362	.790	5.3	1.7	**2.1**	**.7**	**18.6**
2008–09	(Turkey) Fenerbahçe	BSL	38	22.7	**.584**	.384	.683	4.7	1.7	1.0	.7	11.1
2009–10	(Greece) Panellinios	GBL	33	27.9	.566	.350	.634	5.2	1.7	1.0	.6	13.5
2010–11	(Italy) Benetton	LBA	37	28.4	.479	.347	.689	4.8	1.2	1.5	.7	13.6
2011–12	(Israel) Maccabi	ABA	26	22.3	.558	.484	.872	3.6	1.3	.9	.4	10.7
2011–12	(Israel) Maccabi	IBPL	21	23.9	.538	.435	.757	4.3	1.4	.9	.4	13.4
2012–13	(Israel) Maccabi	IBPL	31	25.5	.544	**.489**	.806	5.6	2.0	1.5	.6	13.4
2013–14	(Israel) Maccabi	IBPL	28	26.5	.529	.380	.796	5.9	1.4	1.0	.5	12.2
2014–15	(Israel) Maccabi	IBPL	33	26.7	.533	.446	.845	**6.7**	2.1	.7	.5	14.9
2015–16	(Israel) Maccabi	IBPL	19	24.7	.434	.427	.857	5.8	**2.4**	1.4	.2	11.4
2016–17	(Israel) Maccabi	IBPL	19	20.5	.519	.486	**.909**	4.0	1.5	.8	.1	9.8

Source: RealGM

== Personal ==
Smith's wife is Danielle Greene, with whom he has 3 daughters.
