= Nenad Krstić =

Serbian basketball player (born 1983)

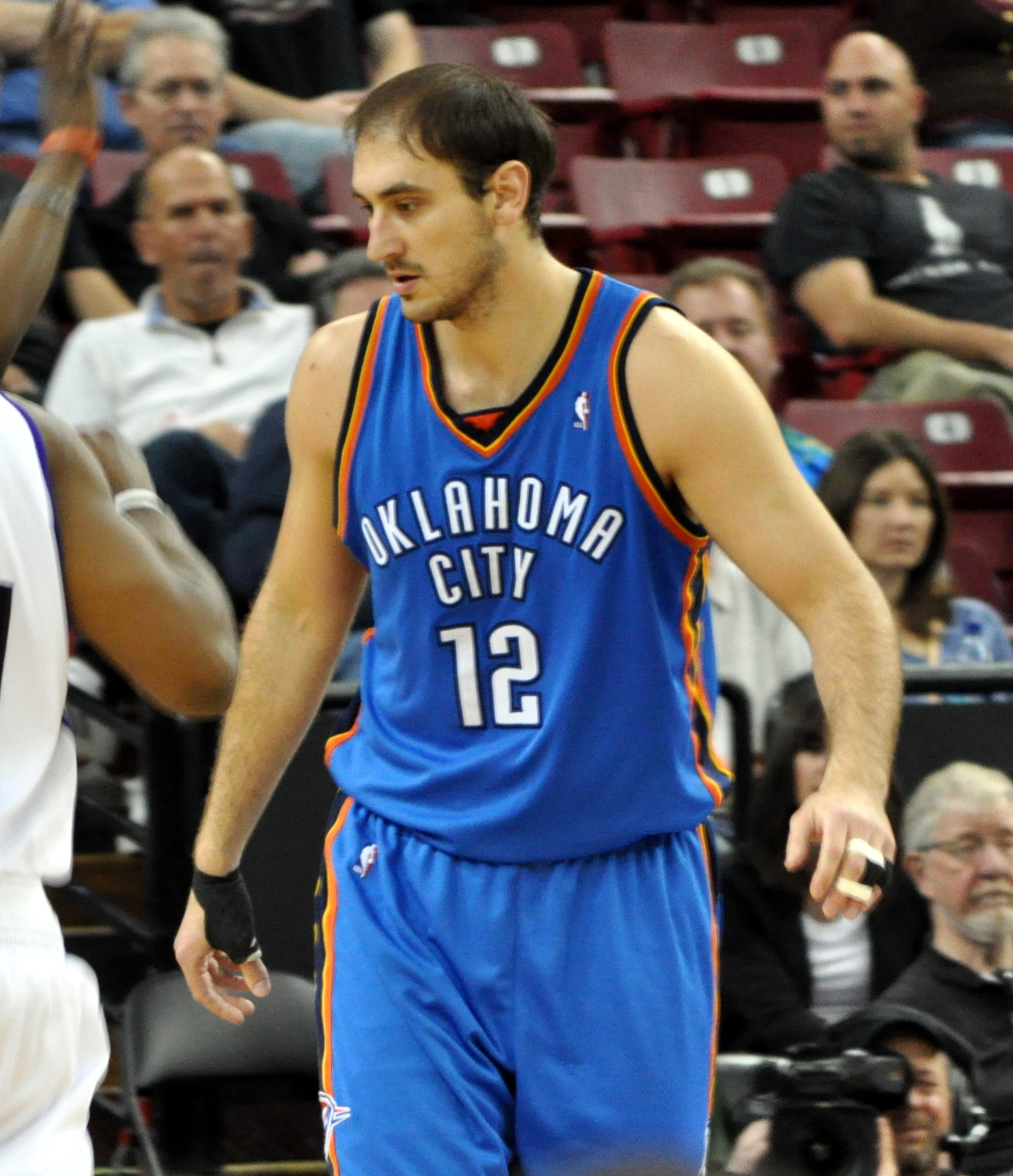
- Krstić with the Oklahoma City Thunder in 2010

Personal information
- Born: July 25, 1983 (age 43) Kraljevo, SR Serbia, SFR Yugoslavia
- Listed height: 2.13 m (7 ft 0 in)
- Listed weight: 121 kg (267 lb)

Career information
- NBA draft: 2002: 1st round, 24th overall pick
- Drafted by: New Jersey Nets
- Playing career: 2000–2016
- Position: Center
- Number: 12, 4

Career history
- 2000–2004: Partizan
- 2004–2008: New Jersey Nets
- 2008: Triumph Lyubertsy
- 2008–2011: Oklahoma City Thunder
- 2011: Boston Celtics
- 2011–2014: CSKA Moscow
- 2014–2016: Anadolu Efes

Career highlights
- NBA All-Rookie Second Team (2005); 2× All-Euroleague First Team (2012, 2013); 3× YUBA League champion (2002–2004); 3× VTB League champion (2012–2014); All-VTB United League Second Team (2013); Russian League champion (2012); 2× All-Russian League First Team (2012, 2013)
- Stats at NBA.com
- Stats at Basketball Reference
Medals
Men's basketball
Representing Serbia
World Cup
Silver medal – second place	2014 Spain	Team
EuroBasket
Silver medal – second place	2009 Poland	Team

Nenad Krstić (Serbian Cyrillic: Ненад Крстић, born July 25, 1983) is a Serbian basketball executive and former professional player.

Krstić represented and captained the Serbian national basketball team internationally. Standing at 2.12 m (7 ft 0 in), he played the center position. Krstić was an NBA All-Rookie Second Team member in 2005 and a two-time All-Euroleague First Team selection in 2012 and 2013.

== Professional career ==
=== Partizan Belgrade ===
His first professional team was Partizan Belgrade where he spent four seasons, making his debut in 2000–01. In the 2003–04 season, his last with Partizan, he averaged 13.4 points per game in the Euroleague. With Partizan, he also won three YUBA League championships in a row, and one Serbian Cup championship in the 2001–02 season.

On June 26, 2002, he was drafted with the 24th overall pick in the 2002 NBA draft by the New Jersey Nets. However, he didn't join the Nets for two seasons, continuing to play with Partizan Belgrade.

=== New Jersey Nets ===
During the 2004–05 NBA season, Krstić logged an impressive rookie campaign for the New Jersey Nets, averaging 10.0 points, 5.3 rebounds and 0.84 blocked shots per game. He was honored as part of the All-Rookie NBA second team.

In his debut in the playoffs against the Miami Heat, Krstić averaged 18.3 points, 7.5 rebounds, and 1.0 assists per game; an exceptional performance for a rookie in the playoffs. This followed a greater trend where Krstić had consistently improved at a great pace as his rookie season progressed. He showed a wide skill set for a big man, including refined post moves and a shooting touch from eighteen feet.

Throughout the 2005–06 season, Krstić's play had continued to rapidly improve. Three quarters of the way through the season, he averaged 13.4 points and 6.1 rebounds, and had become an integral part of the Nets offense. In the first round of the 2006 NBA playoffs against Indiana he averaged 18 points per game along with 7.1 rebounds.

In 2006–07 despite the rough Nets start, Krstić was averaging career-highs in points (16.6), rebounds (6.8), and assists (1.8) before falling to the ground after tearing his anterior cruciate ligament in his left knee versus the L.A. Lakers at Continental Airlines Arena on December 22, 2006. His surgery was successful. Krstić was out for the rest of the 2006–07 NBA season, but returned ahead of schedule to start the 2007–08 NBA season.

His 2007–08 season was a disappointment, as his injury disrupted his play and confidence on the court and he was largely a liability. Krstić later stated in his blog that he felt he let the team down, and vowed to return to his old form at the start of the 08–09 season.

=== Triumph Lyubertsy ===
During the 2008 summer off-season, Krstić entered negotiations with the Russian Super League team Triumph Lyubertsy and eventually signed a 2-year contract (with the NBA an opt-out option) worth €6 million euros net income with them on July 29, 2008. He averaged 10.4 points and 5.1 rebounds per game in seven games in the Russian Super League and 13.3 points and 7.3 rebounds per game in 6 games in the EuroChallenge.

=== Oklahoma City Thunder ===
On December 19, 2008, two NBA league sources told ESPN.com that the Oklahoma City Thunder had agreed in principle to sign Krstić to a three-year offer sheet. On December 22, Krstić officially signed the offer sheet. The New Jersey Nets had seven days to match the offer, or Krstić would be free to join the Thunder. The Nets declined to match, and the Thunder waived Steven Hill to make room for Krstić.

He played for the first time in a Thunder uniform on January 7, 2009, versus the Minnesota Timberwolves, scoring six points and blocking 2 shots in 16 minutes.

=== Boston Celtics ===
On February 24, 2011, Krstić was traded along with Jeff Green and a 2012 first-round pick to the Boston Celtics for Kendrick Perkins and Nate Robinson. In his first game as a Celtic, he recorded 9 points and 6 rebounds in a win against the Los Angeles Clippers on February 26.

Krstić's final NBA game was on May 11, 2011, in Game 5 of the Eastern Conference Semifinals against the Miami Heat. Boston would lose that game 87 - 97 (thus losing the series to Miami 4 - 1) with Krstić recording 8 points, 2 rebounds and 2 blocks.

=== CSKA Moscow ===
On June 22, 2011, Krstić signed a two-year contract with the Russian powerhouse CSKA Moscow. Over the season, he averaged 14.2 points and 5.4 rebounds in 24.5 minutes per game in the Euroleague. That earned him his first selection for the All-Euroleague First Team. In the Euroleague Final against Olympiacos, CSKA Moscow lost by 61–62 after Georgios Printezis's buzzer beater in the last seconds of the game, securing his team second Euroleague championship in history.

After a good season with CSKA Moscow, there were rumors that he was considering a return to the Boston Celtics. However, on July 10, 2012, Krstić signed a new two-year contract with CSKA Moscow, including a team's option to extend him for one more season. At the end of the 2012–13 Euroleague season, Krstić was included for the second-straight time in the All-Euroleague First Team.

2013–14 season

After slow start at the beginning of the 2013–2014 season, caused by some private problems he was having outside basketball, by the time he was improving his performances. In December 2013 it was revealed that he is a candidate for FIBA Europe Player of the Year. Eventually, Tony Parker would go for the second straight award. In loss to his former club Partizan Belgrade, he played his best game of the season by scoring 27 points and grabbing 7 rebounds. He was named Euroleague MVP for month January, averaging fifth-highest 16.4 points, 6 rebounds and 21.6 in PIR. After beating Panathinaikos in the playoff series, CSKA Moscow lost in the semifinal of the Euroleague Final Four to Maccabi Tel Aviv. Shortly after failing to win the Euroleague for third straight year, the president of CSKA blamed Krstić and his Serbian teammate Miloš Teodosić for not putting enough effort over the season. Krstić finished his third Euroleague season with CSKA Moscow with the lowest averages of 9.6 points and 3.2 rebounds over 29 games. Shortly after the Final 4, CSKA was facing elimination in the VTB United League from Lokomotiv Kuban, travelling by 2-0 without home advantage. Krstić helped CSKA eventually win the series after big comeback and advance to semifinals, answering to previous critics of the club's president. Eventually, CSKA won the VTB United League by sweeping Nizhny Novgorod 3–0 in the final series.

In the late June, CSKA Moscow used option in his contract to part ways and allow him to sign with another team. In July 2014, weeks after signing with Anadolu Efes, he had an interview for Večernje novosti. He stated that Ettore Messina, former coach of CSKA Moscow, was "killing him as a player", putting him to play at unnatural to him power forward position, which affected on his performances over the last two seasons with the club.

=== Anadolu Efes ===
On June 26, 2014, Krstić signed a two-year contract with the Turkish team Anadolu Efes. He came in the club just after Dušan Ivković was appointed as new head coach, with whom he worked in the national team for many years.

2014–15 season

On November 2, 2014, he fractured his left forearm, after flagrant foul by Mutlu Demir, in a game against Pınar Karşıyaka and was estimated to return in 6 to 8 weeks. He returned on the court on December 24, in a game against Darüşşafaka Doğuş and scored 2 points.

As the season was reaching to an end, Anadolu Efes cemented second position of the regular season in the Turkish League. However, they were stopped in the Euroleague after the quarter-final series 1–3 loss to the eventual champion Real Madrid.

On June 14, 2015, in a Game 3 of the Turkish League final series against Pınar Karşıyaka, he tore ACL on his right knee. The injury will keep him off-the-court for estimated 6 months.

Over the season, he averaged 12.4 points and 5.2 rebounds in 27 games played of the Turkish League. He also played in 19 Euroleague games, where he averaged 12.8 points, 5.1 rebounds and a career-high 1.4 assists per game.

=== Galatasaray Odeabank ===
On June 30, 2016, Krstić signed with Turkish club Galatasaray Odeabank for the 2016–17 season. On September 9, 2016, he parted ways with Galatasaray.

== National team career ==
Krstić played with the Serbia and Montenegro national team at the 2004 Summer Olympics and EuroBasket 2005.

As captain of Serbian national team he played at the EuroBasket 2009, where he won the silver medal and 2010 FIBA World Championship, where he won the fourth place. In the following year, he played at the 2010 FIBA World Championship where Serbia was defeated 99–88 by Lithuania in the game for the bronze medal. He represented the national team at the EuroBasket 2011 in Lithuania where Serbia finished eighth and at the EuroBasket 2013 in Slovenia where Serbia finished seventh and qualified for 2014 FIBA Basketball World Cup. At the World Cup in Spain, Serbian national team took the silver medal. Shortly after the final game of the tournament, he retired from the national team, after ten years of playing and six years of captaining.

== Post-playing career ==
On August 22, 2019, Krstić was named a director of the youth national basketball teams at the Basketball Federation of Serbia (KSS). On December 14, 2020, Krstić was elected vice-president of the Basketball Federation of Serbia.

After stepping down from his position at Basketball Federation of Serbia, Krstić was named the president of his hometown team KK Sloga Kraljevo.

== Personal life ==
Krstić is married to his wife Tanja and has one daughter. Krstić, whose nickname is "Curly", was voted the third most eligible bachelor by Serbia's version of People magazine. On August 19, 2010, in a game against Greece for the Acropolis International Tournament 2010, he participated in a fight between players and threw a chair at Greek Ioannis Bourousis. That resulted in his spending the night at the police station, from where he was released the day after. He stated in his defence that he thought Bourousis was a fan when he threw the chair at him. In the same fight Krstić attacked Greek player Sofoklis Schortsanitis a number of times from behind.

After the 2010 Serbia earthquake, Krstić and his Oklahoma City Thunder teammates donated $10,000 to help his hometown of Kraljevo, which was directly affected by the nearby calamity.

Krstić owns and operates a distillery.

== Career statistics ==
Legend
GP	Games played	GS	Games started	MPG	Minutes per game
FG%	Field-goal percentage	3P%	3-point field-goal percentage	FT%	Free-throw percentage
RPG	Rebounds per game	APG	Assists per game	SPG	Steals per game
BPG	Blocks per game	PPG	Points per game	PIR	Performance index rating
**Bold**	Career high

=== NBA ===
==== Regular season ====
Year	Team	GP	GS	MPG	FG%	3P%	FT%	RPG	APG	SPG	BPG	PPG
2004–05	New Jersey	75	57	26.2	.493	.000	.725	5.3	1.0	.4	.8	10.0
2005–06	New Jersey	**80**	**80**	30.9	.507	**.250**	.698	6.4	1.1	.4	.8	13.5
2006–07	New Jersey	26	26	**32.6**	.526	.000	.711	**6.8**	**1.8**	.4	.9	**16.4**
2007–08	New Jersey	45	38	18.0	.410	.000	.754	4.4	.6	.2	.4	6.6
2008–09	Oklahoma City	46	29	24.8	.469	.000	.797	5.5	.6	**.5**	**1.1**	9.7
2009–10	Oklahoma City	76	76	22.9	.502	.200	.717	5.0	.7	.4	.6	8.4
2010–11	Oklahoma City	47	47	21.7	.498	.000	**.803**	4.4	.4	.4	.4	7.6
2010–11	Boston	24	20	23.0	**.537**	.000	.750	5.3	.3	.3	.3	9.1
**Career**		419	373	25.2	.494	.143	.730	5.4	.8	.4	.7	10.0

==== Playoffs ====
Year	Team	GP	GS	MPG	FG%	3P%	FT%	RPG	APG	SPG	BPG	PPG
2005	New Jersey	4	4	**38.5**	.563	.000	.792	**7.5**	**1.8**	.3	.5	**18.3**
2006	New Jersey	**11**	**11**	33.3	.504	.000	.711	6.8	.7	**.5**	**.9**	14.7
2010	Oklahoma City	6	6	21.5	.405	.000	**.929**	5.8	.7	**.5**	.7	7.2
2011	Boston	7	0	8.0	**.625**	.000	.667	1.7	.3	.0	.6	1.7
**Career**		28	21	25.2	.505	.000	.767	5.4	.8	.3	.7	10.4

=== Euroleague ===
Year	Team	GP	GS	MPG	FG%	3P%	FT%	RPG	APG	SPG	BPG	PPG	PIR
2001–02	Partizan	13	8	19.7	.385	.000	.595	4.4	.2	.5	.6	4.8	4.2
2002–03	Partizan	10	7	**30.1**	.489	.000	.717	**6.2**	.9	**1.2**	.6	12.8	13.1
2003–04	Partizan	9	7	24.8	.600	.000	.721	2.9	.6	.2	**1.0**	13.4	13.0
2011–12	CSKA Moscow	22	**18**	24.5	**.629**	.000	.786	5.5	.6	.5	.5	**14.2**	**18.4**
2012–13	CSKA Moscow	**29**	7	23.4	.613	**1.000**	.738	4.4	1.0	.3	.7	13.0	16.8
2013–14	CSKA Moscow	**29**	15	19.4	.502	.600	.630	3.2	.8	.3	.6	9.6	10.0
2014–15	Anadolu Efes	19	10	21.5	.571	.000	**.808**	5.1	**1.4**	.3	.5	12.8	17.1
**Career**		131	72	22.7	.560	.500	.732	4.5	.8	.4	.6	11.6	13.9

== See also ==
- List of European basketball players in the United States
- List of Serbian NBA players

Sporting positions
Preceded by Igor Rakočević	Vice president of the Basketball Federation of Serbia for men's basketball 2020–present	Incumbent

Sporting positions
Preceded by Milan Gurović	Serbia captain 2008 – 2014	Succeeded by Miloš Teodosić
