= 2012–13 Euroleague Top 16 Group F =

Standings and Results for Group F of the Top 16 phase of the 2012–13 Turkish Airlines Euroleague basketball tournament.

== Standings ==
Pos	Team	Pld	W	L	PF	PA	PD	Qualification
1	(Spain) FC Barcelona Regal	14	13	1	1151	986	+165	Advance to quarterfinals
2	(Greece) Olympiacos	14	9	5	1068	1033	+35	Advance to quarterfinals
3	(Israel) Maccabi Tel Aviv	14	8	6	1105	1012	+93	Advance to quarterfinals
4	(Spain) Laboral Kutxa	14	8	6	1093	1045	+48	Advance to quarterfinals
5	(Russia) Khimki	14	7	7	1133	1051	+82	
6	(Italy) Montepaschi Siena	14	7	7	1036	1057	−21	
7	(Turkey) Beşiktaş	14	2	12	893	1104	−211	
8	(Turkey) Fenerbahçe Ülker	14	2	12	1055	1246	−191	

Source: Euroleague

== Fixtures and results ==
All times given below are in Central European Time.

=== Game 1 ===
27 December 2012
19:00

Report

Beşiktaş (Turkey)	75–80	(Russia) Khimki
Scoring by quarter: 20–14, 19–31, 18–22, 18–13
Pts: Christopher 20; Rebs: Markota 8 Asts: Jerrells 5		Pts: Fridzon 20; Rebs: Monia 6 Asts: Planinić 9

Abdi İpekçi Arena, Istanbul
Attendance: 5,550
Referees: Sasa Pukl (SLO), Paolo Taurino (ITA), Olegs Latisevs (LAT)

27 December 2012
20:30

Report

Laboral Kutxa (Spain)	82–74	(Greece) Olympiacos
Scoring by quarter: 19–24, 21–20, 27–11, 15–19
Pts: Lampe 25; Rebs: Nocioni 6 Asts: Heurtel 7		Pts: Spanoulis 18; Rebs: Papanikolaou 6 Asts: Antić 4

Fernando Buesa Arena, Vitoria-Gasteiz
Attendance: 12,426
Referees: Tolga Şahin (ITA), Motej Boltauzer (SLO), Milija Vojinovic (SRB)

27 December 2012
20:45

Report

Montepaschi Siena (Italy)	79–69	(Israel) Maccabi Tel Aviv
Scoring by quarter: 20–15, 24–20, 19–18, 16–16
Pts: Ress 18; Rebs: Sanikidze 8 Asts: Brown 7		Pts: James 18; Rebs: Hickman 8 Asts: Ohayon, Eliyahu 4

Palasport Mens Sana, Siena
Attendance: 3,831
Referees: José Martín (ESP), Juan Carlos Garcia Gonzalez (ESP), Panagiotis Anastopoulos (GRE)

28 December 2012
20:45

Report

FC Barcelona Regal (Spain)	100–78	(Turkey) Fenerbahçe Ülker
Scoring by quarter: 24–13, 30–22, 25–25, 21–18
Pts: Huertas, Navarro 14; Rebs: Tomić 11; Asts: Sada, Huertas 6		Pts: Bogdanović 19; Rebs: Sato 4 Asts: Sato 5

Palau Blaugrana, Barcelona
Attendance: 4,693
Referees: Milivoje Jovcic (SRB), Eddie Viator (FRA), Boris Shulga (UKR)

=== Game 2 ===
3 January 2013
17:00

Report

Khimki (Russia)	78–65	(Spain) FC Barcelona Regal
Scoring by quarter: 21–18, 25–23, 16–14, 16–10
Pts: Planinić 14; Rebs: Davis, Augustine 8 Asts: Planinić 6		Pts: Tomić 16; Rebs: Lorbek 7 Asts: Huertas 3

Basketball Center, Khimki
Attendance: 5,000
Referees: Grzegorz Ziemblicki (POL), Spiros Gkontas (GRE), Roberto Chiari (ITA)

3 January 2013
20:05

Report

Maccabi Tel Aviv (Israel)	70–71	(Spain) Laboral Kutxa
Scoring by quarter: 23–20, 9–24, 24–6, 14–21
Pts: Hickman 18; Rebs: James 10; Asts: Hickman 5		Pts: Bjelica 17; Rebs: Pleiss 11; Asts: Cook 5

Nokia Arena, Tel Aviv
Attendance: 10,728
Referees: Christos Christodoulou (GRE), Fernando Rocha (POR), Rustu Nuran (TUR)

4 January 2013
19:00

Report

Fenerbahçe Ülker (Turkey)	92–98	(Italy) Montepaschi Siena
Scoring by quarter: 26–26, 25–19, 22–24, 19–29
Pts: Bogdanović 31; Rebs: Preldžić 6 Asts: Preldžić 8		Pts: Brown 41; Rebs: Sanikidze 8 Asts: Brown 7

Ülker Sports Arena, Istanbul
Attendance: 9,200
Referees: Jose Ramon Garcia Ortiz (ESP), Sinisa Herceg (SLO), Petar Obradovic (BIH)

4 January 2013
20:45

Report

Olympiacos (Greece)	77–64	(Turkey) Beşiktaş
Scoring by quarter: 20–13, 17–14, 20–19, 20–18
Pts: Spanoulis 18; Rebs: Antić 7 Asts: Spanoulis 4		Pts: Ewing 15; Rebs: Markota 10; Asts: Güler, Markota 2

Peace and Friendship Stadium, Piraeus
Attendance: 9,000
Referees: Guerrino Cerebuch (ITA), Antonio Conde (ESP), Marko Juras (SRB)

=== Game 3 ===
10 January 2013
20:05

Report

Maccabi Tel Aviv (Israel)	91–73	(Turkey) Fenerbahçe Ülker
Scoring by quarter: 23–21, 13–15, 17–12, 38–25
Pts: Hickman 24; Rebs: James, Hickman 5 Asts: Roth 6		Pts: three players 15; Rebs: Batiste 9 Asts: Preldžić 5

Nokia Arena, Tel Aviv
Attendance: 10,728
Referees: Vicente Bulto (ESP), Emilio Perez Pizarro (ESP), Robert Lottermoser (GER)

10 January 2013
20:45

Report

Laboral Kutxa (Spain)	77–51	(Turkey) Beşiktaş
Scoring by quarter: 27–7, 18–17, 18–11, 14–16
Pts: Oleson 13; Rebs: Lampe 10; Asts: Heurtel 7		Pts: Ewing 12; Rebs: Ewing 6 Asts: four players 2

Fernando Buesa Arena, Vitoria-Gasteiz
Attendance: 12,481
Referees: Grzegorz Ziemblicki (POL), Eddie Viator (FRA), Carmelo Paternico (ITA)

11 January 2013
20:45

Report

Montepaschi Siena (Italy)	82–76	(Russia) Khimki
Scoring by quarter: 20–27, 19–14, 21–19, 22–16
Pts: Brown 20; Rebs: Ress 10; Asts: Hackett 4		Pts: Rivers 13; Rebs: Augustine 6 Asts: Planinić 7

Palasport Mens Sana, Siena
Attendance: 3,906
Referees: Recep Ankarali (TUR), Fernando Rocha (POR), Tomasz Trawicki (POL)

11 January 2013
20:45

Report

FC Barcelona Regal (Spain)	76–68	(Greece) Olympiacos
Scoring by quarter: 18–13, 23–19, 19–20, 16-16
Pts: Tomić 15; Rebs: Tomić 12; Asts: Huertas 3		Pts: Printezis 14; Rebs: Hines 9 Asts: Spanoulis 5

Palau Blaugrana, Barcelona
Attendance: 5,649
Referees: Ilija Belosevic (SRB), Paolo Taurino (ITA), Rustu Nuran (TUR)

=== Game 4 ===
17 January 2013
20:45

Report

Beşiktaş (Turkey)	59–73	(Spain) FC Barcelona Regal
Scoring by quarter: 10–15, 22–19, 16–17, 11–22
Pts: Jerrells 17; Rebs: Markota 8 Asts: Güler 5		Pts: Tomić 15; Rebs: Wallace 8 Asts: Wallace 6

Abdi İpekçi Arena, Istanbul
Attendance: 5,600
Referees: Christos Christodoulou (GRE), Nicola Maestre (FRA), Elias Koromilas (GRE)

18 January 2013
17:00

Report

Khimki (Russia)	88–67	(Israel) Maccabi Tel Aviv
Scoring by quarter: 19–25, 27–9, 24–16, 18–17
Pts: Rivers 20; Rebs: Davis 9 Asts: Planinić 6		Pts: Eliyahu 17; Rebs: James 6 Asts: Ohayon 6

Basketball Center, Khimki
Attendance: 4,550
Referees: Miguel Perez Perez (ESP), Matej Boltauzer (SLO), Marcin Kowalski (POL)

18 January 2013
19:30

Report

Fenerbahçe Ülker (Turkey)	75–97	(Spain) Laboral Kutxa
Scoring by quarter: 19–20, 13–28, 19–23, 24–26
Pts: Bogdanović, Preldžić 16; Rebs: Andersen, Savaş 4 Asts: Andersen, Preldžić 3		Pts: Nocioni 19; Rebs: Lampe 9 Asts: Heurtel 6

Ülker Sports Arena, Istanbul
Attendance: 6,200
Referees: Ilija Belosevic (SRB), Spiros Gkontas (GRE), Robert Vyklicky (CZE)

18 January 2013
21:00

Report

Olympiacos (Greece)	72–74	(Italy) Montepaschi Siena
Scoring by quarter: 25–20, 11–18, 15–14, 21–22
Pts: Hines, Spanoulis 13; Rebs: Hines 9 Asts: Spanoulis 5		Pts: Brown 22; Rebs: Sanikidze 8 Asts: Brown 6

Peace and Friendship Stadium, Piraeus
Attendance: 7,500
Referees: Vicente Bulto (ESP), Milivoje Jovcic (SRB), Emilio Perez Pizarro (ESP)

=== Game 5 ===
24 January 2013
19:30

Report

Fenerbahçe Ülker (Turkey)	85–82	(Russia) Khimki
Scoring by quarter: 17–19, 19–21, 20–14, 29–28
Pts: Bogdanović 26; Rebs: Sato, Peker 7 Asts: McCalebb 4		Pts: Planinić 25; Rebs: Planinić 6 Asts: Planinić 6

Ülker Sports Arena, Istanbul
Attendance: 4,300
Referees: José Martín (ESP), Antonio Conde (ESP), Joseph Bissang (FRA)

24 January 2013
20:15

Report

Laboral Kutxa (Spain)	79–90	(Spain) FC Barcelona Regal
Scoring by quarter: 28–27, 19–23, 13–19, 19–21
Pts: Lampe 21; Rebs: Lampe 11; Asts: Heurtel, Lampe 3		Pts: Mickeal 23; Rebs: Lorbek, Mickeal 5 Asts: Huertas 4

Fernando Buesa Arena, Vitoria-Gasteiz
Attendance: 15,068
Referees: Luigi Lamonica (ITA), Jakub Zamojski (POL), Damir Javor (SLO)

24 January 2013
20:45

Report

Maccabi Tel Aviv (Israel)	77–78	(Greece) Olympiacos
Scoring by quarter: 19–30, 14–14, 29–13, 15–21
Pts: Smith 17; Rebs: James 12; Asts: Ohayon 5		Pts: Spanoulis 24; Rebs: Shermadini 9 Asts: Spanoulis 4

Nokia Arena, Tel Aviv
Attendance: 10,728
Referees: Juan Carlos Arteaga (ESP), Recep Ankarali (TUR), Boris Shulga (UKR)

25 January 2013
20:45

Report

Montepaschi Siena (Italy)	63–57	(Turkey) Beşiktaş
Scoring by quarter: 22–13, 15–13, 6–19, 20–12
Pts: Sanikidze 14; Rebs: Kangur 10; Asts: Hackett 5		Pts: Jerrells 16; Rebs: Markota 8 Asts: Jerrells 3

Palasport Mens Sana, Siena
Attendance: 3,942
Referees: Borys Ryzhyk (UKR), Marek Cmikiewicz (POL), Oscar Perea (ESP)

=== Game 6 ===
31 January 2013
19:00

Report

Beşiktaş (Turkey)	55–77	(Israel) Maccabi Tel Aviv
Scoring by quarter: 12–21, 10–22, 13–14, 20-20
Pts: Çetin 13; Rebs: Falker 8 Asts: Jerrells 4		Pts: Eliyahu 14; Rebs: James, Eliyahu 5 Asts: Ohayon 6

Abdi İpekçi Arena, Istanbul
Attendance: 5,130
Referees: Luigi Lamonica (ITA), Apostolos Kalpakas (SWE), Tomasz Trawicki (POL)

31 January 2013
20:45

Report

Olympiacos (Greece)	82–71	(Turkey) Fenerbahçe Ülker
Scoring by quarter: 23–24, 20–13, 25–12, 14–22
Pts: Spanoulis 15; Rebs: Perperoglou 9 Asts: Spanoulis 5		Pts: McCalebb, Bogdanović 20; Rebs: McCalebb 6 Asts: McCalebb 3

Peace and Friendship Stadium, Piraeus
Attendance: 7,000
Referees: Fernando Rocha (POR), Olegs Latisevs (LAT), Luis Lopes (POR)

31 January 2013
20:45

Report

FC Barcelona Regal (Spain)	85–66	(Italy) Montepaschi Siena
Scoring by quarter: 20–13, 28–16, 20–18, 17–19
Pts: Tomić 20; Rebs: Tomić 5 Asts: Huertas, Tomić 5		Pts: Brown 19; Rebs: Kangur 6 Asts: Brown 4

Palau Blaugrana, Barcelona
Attendance: 4,563
Referees: Sreten Radovic (CRO), Matej Boltauzer (SLO), Robert Lottermoser (GER)

1 February 2013
20:30

Report

Laboral Kutxa (Spain)	71–83	(Russia) Khimki
Scoring by quarter: 18–19, 27–24, 11–19, 15–21
Pts: Causeur 15; Rebs: Lampe 5 Asts: Cook, Heurtel 4		Pts: Davis 20; Rebs: Monia 6 Asts: Planinić 6

Fernando Buesa Arena, Vitoria-Gasteiz
Attendance: 11,063
Referees: Christos Christodoulou (GRE), Roberto Chiari (ITA), Boris Shulga (UKR)

=== Game 7 ===
14 February 2013
20:05

Report

Maccabi Tel Aviv (Israel)	77–82	(Spain) FC Barcelona Regal
Scoring by quarter: 22–20, 17–21, 14–26, 24–15
Pts: Hickman 19; Rebs: Caner-Medley 5 Asts: Ohayon		Pts: Tomic 18; Rebs: Sada 7 Asts: four players 3

Nokia Arena, Tel Aviv
Attendance: 10,728
Referees: Borys Ryzhyk (UKR), Tolga Sahin (ITA), Milija Vojinovic (SRB)

15 February 2013
16:30

Report

Khimki (Russia)	82–87	(Greece) Olympiacos
Scoring by quarter: 23–19, 20–16, 17–19, 22–33
Pts: Davis 20; Rebs: Lončar, Davis 9 Asts: Planinić 13		Pts: Hines, Spanoulis 19; Rebs: Hines 4 Asts: Spanoulis 7

Basketball Center, Khimki
Attendance: 4,450
Referees: Luigi Lamonica (ITA), Robert Lottermoser (GER), Eddie Viator (FRA)

15 February 2013
19:00

Report

Fenerbahçe Ülker (Turkey)	78–72	(Turkey) Beşiktaş
Scoring by quarter: 19–15, 13–27, 16–13, 30–17
Pts: Bogdanović 25; Rebs: Andersen 7 Asts: Ermiş 5		Pts: Markota 15; Rebs: Jerrells 7 Asts: Jerrells 4

Ülker Sports Arena, Istanbul
Attendance: 7,780
Referees: Dubravko Muhvic (CRO), Sreten Radovic (CRO), Panagiotis Anastopoulos (GRE)

15 February 2013
20:45

Report

Montepaschi Siena (Italy)	85–74	(Spain) Laboral Kutxa
Scoring by quarter: 22–23, 13–14, 26–13, 24–24
Pts: Brown 18; Rebs: Moss 11; Asts: Brown 5		Pts: Lampe 17; Rebs: Bjelica 7 Asts: Heurtel 8

Palasport Mens Sana, Siena
Attendance: 4,315
Referees: Fernando Rocha (POR), Olegs Latisevs (LAT), Joseph Bissang (FRA)

=== Game 8 ===
21 February 2013
18:45

Report

Fenerbahçe Ülker (Turkey)	60–99	(Spain) FC Barcelona Regal
Scoring by quarter: 13–23, 6–27, 21–26, 20–23
Pts: Bogdanović 18; Rebs: Andersen 6 Asts: Preldžić 7		Pts: Mickeal 17; Rebs: Jawai 7 Asts: Huertas, Navarro 4

Ülker Sports Arena, Istanbul
Attendance: 6,100
Referees: Christos Christodoulou (GRE), Eddie Viator (FRA), Nicola Maestre (FRA)

21 February 2013
20:05

Report

Maccabi Tel Aviv (Israel)	92–61	(Italy) Montepaschi Siena
Scoring by quarter: 22-22, 24–12, 23–19, 23–8
Pts: Smith, Ohayon 19; Rebs: Smith 8 Asts: Smith 4		Pts: Brown, Kangur 13; Rebs: Eze, Janning 5 Asts: Brown, Hackett 3

Nokia Arena, Tel Aviv
Attendance: 10,500
Referees: Ilija Belosevic (SRB), Luis Lopes (POR), Damir Javor (SLO)

22 February 2013
16:30

Report

Khimki (Russia)	87–56	(Turkey) Beşiktaş
Scoring by quarter: 16–11, 22–16, 25–19, 24–10
Pts: Davis 18; Rebs: Davis 6 Asts: Vyaltsev 5		Pts: Çetin, Nalga 10; Rebs: Markota 9 Asts: Çetin, Markota 4

Basketball Center, Khimki
Attendance: 3,250
Referees: Spiros Gkontas (GRE), Jakub Zamojski (POL), Gianluca Mattioli (ITA)

22 February 2013
20:00

Report

Olympiacos (Greece)	82–74	(Spain) Laboral Kutxa
Scoring by quarter: 18–11, 23–16, 21–23, 20–24
Pts: Law 18; Rebs: Printezis 6 Asts: Spanoulis 5		Pts: Heurtel 16; Rebs: Bjelica 8 Asts: Heurtel 9

Peace and Friendship Stadium, Piraeus
Attendance: 5,500
Referees: Guerrino Cerebuch (ITA), Tolga Sahin (ITA), Rustu Nuran (TUR)

=== Game 9 ===
28 February 2013
19:00

Report

Beşiktaş (Turkey)	60–79	(Greece) Olympiacos
Scoring by quarter: 15–13, 15–25, 21–22, 9–19
Pts: Vidmar, Christopher 13; Rebs: Falker 9 Asts: Akın 4		Pts: Powell 16; Rebs: Printezis 8 Asts: Spanoulis 8

Abdi İpekçi Arena, Istanbul
Attendance: 4,850
Referees: José Martín (ESP), Antonio Conde (ESP), Boris Shulga (UKR)

28 February 2013
20:30

Report

Laboral Kutxa (Spain)	62–66	(Israel) Maccabi Tel Aviv
Scoring by quarter: 10–11, 21–17, 16–15, 15–23
Pts: Lampe 19; Rebs: Lampe 12; Asts: Heurtel 7		Pts: Smith 20; Rebs: James 10; Asts: Pnini 3

Fernando Buesa Arena, Vitoria-Gasteiz
Attendance: 10,500
Referees: Sreten Radovic (CRO), Robert Lottermoser (GER), Carmelo Paternico (ITA)

28 February 2013
20:45

Report

Montepaschi Siena (Italy)	87–69	(Turkey) Fenerbahçe Ülker
Scoring by quarter: 21–18, 28–17, 16–18, 22–16
Pts: Rašić 16; Rebs: Eze 8 Asts: Hackett, Brown 4		Pts: Bogdanović 22; Rebs: Andersen 8 Asts: Sato 2

Palasport Mens Sana, Siena
Attendance: 4,558
Referees: Juan Carlos Arteaga (ESP), Jakub Zamojski (POL), Elias Koromilas (GRE)

28 February 2013
20:45

Report

FC Barcelona Regal (Spain)	71–69	(Russia) Khimki
Scoring by quarter: 21–16, 23–18, 16–14, 11–21
Pts: Navarro 19; Rebs: Tomić 5 Asts: Sada 5		Pts: Davis 18; Rebs: Davis 9 Asts: Rivers 3

Palau Blaugrana, Barcelona
Attendance: 5,344
Referees: Ilija Belosevic (SRB), Recep Ankarali (TUR), Luis Lopes (POR)

=== Game 10 ===
7 March 2013
20:45

Report

Olympiacos (Greece)	77–90	(Spain) FC Barcelona Regal
Scoring by quarter: 20–17, 16–29, 26–17, 15–27
Pts: Spanoulis 23; Rebs: Printezis 7 Asts: Three players 3		Pts: Lorbek 21; Rebs: Jawai 8 Asts: Huertas 6

Peace and Friendship Stadium, Piraeus
Attendance: 10,000
Referees: Luigi Lamonica (ITA), Jakub Zamojski (POL), Gianluca Mattioli (ITA)

7 March 2013
20:45

Report

Fenerbahçe Ülker (Turkey)	85–94	(Israel) Maccabi Tel Aviv
Scoring by quarter: 22-22, 18–27, 20–22, 25–23
Pts: Bogdanović 26; Rebs: McCalebb 9 Asts: Preldžić 7		Pts: Hickman 18; Rebs: James 7 Asts: Hickman 6

Ülker Sports Arena, Istanbul
Attendance: 1,800
Referees: Dani Hierrezuelo (ESP), Spiros Gkontas (GRE), Juan Carlos Garcia Gonzalez (ESP)

8 March 2013
16:30

Report

Khimki (Russia)	78–71	(Italy) Montepaschi Siena
Scoring by quarter: 25–20, 19–17, 20–17, 14–17
Pts: Rivers 19; Rebs: Davis 7 Asts: Planinić 9		Pts: Brown 17; Rebs: Sanikidze, Moss 6 Asts: Brown 5

Basketball Center, Khimki
Attendance: 3,750
Referees: Christos Christodoulou (GRE), Dubravko Muhvic (CRO), Rustu Nuran (TUR)

8 March 2013
19:00

Report

Beşiktaş (Turkey)	73–83	(Spain) Laboral Kutxa
Scoring by quarter: 10–18, 13–25, 27–15, 23–25
Pts: Vidmar 18; Rebs: Minard 8 Asts: Akın 6		Pts: Nocioni 22; Rebs: Bjelica 8 Asts: Cook 5

Abdi İpekçi Arena, Istanbul
Attendance: 2,950
Referees: Sasa Pukl (SLO), Borys Ryzhyk (UKR), Elias Koromilas (GRE)

=== Game 11 ===
14 March 2013
20:45

Report

Maccabi Tel Aviv (Israel)	80–79	(Russia) Khimki
Scoring by quarter: 19–18, 17–22, 24–16, 20–23
Pts: Hickman 30; Rebs: Smith, Caner-Medley 7 Asts: Ohayon 6		Pts: Fridzon 16; Rebs: three players 9 Asts: Planinić 9

Nokia Arena, Tel Aviv
Attendance: 10,728
Referees: Juan Carlos Arteaga (ESP), Antonio Conde (ESP), Elias Koromilas (GRE)

14 March 2013
20:45

Report

Montepaschi Siena (Italy)	67–68	(Greece) Olympiacos
Scoring by quarter: 18–17, 19-19, 17–13, 13–19
Pts: Kangur, Janning 14; Rebs: Eze 9 Asts: Brown, Janning 4		Pts: Sloukas, Papanikolaou 11; Rebs: Hines 11; Asts: Spanoulis 5

Palasport Mens Sana, Siena
Attendance: 4,678
Referees: Jose Ramon Garcia Ortiz (ESP), Borys Ryzhyk (UKR), Eddie Viator (FRA)

14 March 2013
20:45

Report

Laboral Kutxa (Spain)	87–67	(Turkey) Fenerbahçe Ülker
Scoring by quarter: 16–10, 30–12, 21–17, 20–28
Pts: Pleiss 14; Rebs: Pleiss 6 Asts: Cook 5		Pts: McCalebb 16; Rebs: Savaş 5 Asts: Preldžić 4

Fernando Buesa Arena, Vitoria-Gasteiz
Attendance: 9,936
Referees: Milivoje Jovcic (SRB), Matej Boltauzer (SLO), Olegs Latisevs (LAT)

15 March 2013
20:45

Report

FC Barcelona Regal (Spain)	86–61	(Turkey) Beşiktaş
Scoring by quarter: 29–15, 18–16, 20–19, 19–11
Pts: Jawai 16; Rebs: Jawai 9 Asts: Huertas, Jasikevičius 6		Pts: Özer 18; Rebs: Özer 6 Asts: Çetin 4

Palau Blaugrana, Barcelona
Attendance: 4,578
Referees: Robert Lottermoser (GER), Srdan Dozai (CRO), Milija Vojinovic (SRB)

=== Game 12 ===
21 March 2013
20:45

Report

FC Barcelona Regal (Spain)	83–74	(Spain) Laboral Kutxa
Scoring by quarter: 18–12, 24–20, 19–24, 22–18
Pts: Lorbek 16; Rebs: Tomić 8 Asts: Huertas, Navarro 6		Pts: Lampe 21; Rebs: Pleiß, Lampe 6 Asts: Cook, Heurtel 3

Palau Blaugrana, Barcelona
Attendance: 4,773
Referees: Christos Christodoulou (GRE), Tolga Sahin (ITA), Damir Javor (SLO)

22 March 2013
16:30

Report

Khimki (Russia)	99–76	(Turkey) Fenerbahçe Ülker
Scoring by quarter: 22–23, 27–14, 21–24, 29–15
Pts: Koponen 23; Rebs: Fridzon 5 Asts: Koponen 7		Pts: McCalebb 18; Rebs: Peker 5 Asts: McCalebb 7

Basketball Center, Khimki
Attendance: 3,050
Referees: José Martín (ESP), Boris Shulga (UKR), Tomasz Trawicki (POL)

22 March 2013
19:00

Report

Beşiktaş (Turkey)	72–70	(Italy) Montepaschi Siena
Scoring by quarter: 18–16, 17–19, 13–18, 24–17
Pts: Açık 17; Rebs: Vidmar, Nalga 6 Asts: Christopher 5		Pts: Brown 19; Rebs: Kangur 5 Asts: Brown 8

Abdi İpekçi Arena, Istanbul
Attendance: 2,750
Referees: Juan Carlos Garcia Gonzalez (ESP), Miguel Perez Perez (ESP), Robert Vyklicky (CZE)

22 March 2013
20:00

Report

Olympiacos (Greece)	67–73	(Israel) Maccabi Tel Aviv
Scoring by quarter: 13–21, 10–20, 26–15, 18–17
Pts: Spanoulis 19; Rebs: Hines 5 Asts: Spanoulis 4		Pts: Logan 20; Rebs: James 10; Asts: Ohayon 4

Peace and Friendship Stadium, Piraeus
Attendance: 6,000
Referees: Ilija Belosevic (SRB), Matej Boltauzer (SLO), Rustu Nuran (TUR)

=== Game 13 ===
28 March 2013
20:30

Report

Maccabi Tel Aviv (Israel)	101–58	(Turkey) Beşiktaş
Scoring by quarter: 29–11, 32–16, 30–8, 10–23
Pts: Hickman, Smith 16; Rebs: Smith 9 Asts: Ohayon 7		Pts: Minard 12; Rebs: Minard 7 Asts: Açık 4

Nokia Arena, Tel Aviv
Attendance: 10,728
Referees: Dubravko Muhvic (CRO), Paolo Taurino (ITA), Nicola Maestre (FRA)

29 March 2013
16:30

Report

Khimki (Russia)	82–86	(Spain) Laboral Kutxa
Scoring by quarter: 19–22, 24-24, 17–22, 22–18
Pts: Davis 15; Rebs: Davis 7 Asts: Planinić 9		Pts: Nocioni 24; Rebs: Nocioni, Bjelica 6 Asts: Cook 11

Basketball Center, Khimki
Attendance: 4,210
Referees: Guerrino Cerebuch (ITA), Jakub Zamojski (POL), Panagiotis Anastopoulos (GRE)

29 March 2013
20:00

Report

Fenerbahçe Ülker (Turkey)	73–78	(Greece) Olympiacos
Scoring by quarter: 13–19, 21–14, 19–23, 20–22
Pts: Three players 12; Rebs: Savaş 7 Asts: Preldžić 7		Pts: Papanikolaou 16; Rebs: Three players 5 Asts: Spanoulis 7

Ülker Sports Arena, Istanbul
Attendance: 3,100
Referees: Juan Carlos Arteaga (ESP), Emilio Perez Pizarro (ESP), Milija Vojinovic (SRB)

29 March 2013
20:45

Report

Montepaschi Siena (Italy)	69–77	(Spain) FC Barcelona Regal
Scoring by quarter: 25–23, 15–22, 15–20, 14–12
Pts: Brown 15; Rebs: Three players 5 Asts: Brown 6		Pts: Jawai 22; Rebs: Jawai 12; Asts: Huertas 6

Palasport Mens Sana, Siena
Attendance: 5,065
Referees: Ilija Belosevic (SRB), Sreten Radovic (CRO), Joseph Bissang (FRA)

=== Game 14 ===
4 April 2013
20:45

Report

Olympiacos (Greece)	79–70	(Russia) Khimki
Scoring by quarter: 22–20, 23–18, 15–19, 19–13
Pts: Papanikolaou 21; Rebs: Papanikolaou 12; Asts: Law 8		Pts: Augustine 19; Rebs: Augustine 8 Asts: Koponen 6

Peace and Friendship Stadium, Piraeus
Attendance: 8,000
Referees: Fernando Rocha (POR), Robert Lottermoser (GER), Olegs Latisevs (LAT)

4 April 2013
20:45

Report

Laboral Kutxa (Spain)	76–64	(Italy) Montepaschi Siena
Scoring by quarter: 15–11, 24–16, 18–15, 19–22
Pts: Lampe 27; Rebs: Nocioni 13; Asts: Heurtel 8		Pts: Brown 24; Rebs: Eze 6 Asts: Brown 6

Fernando Buesa Arena, Vitoria-Gasteiz
Attendance: 13,528
Referees: Sasa Pukl (SLO), Recep Ankarali (TUR), Luis Lopes (POR)

4 April 2013
20:45

Report

FC Barcelona Regal (Spain)	74–71	(Israel) Maccabi Tel Aviv
Scoring by quarter: 19-19, 17–13, 15–24, 23–15
Pts: Abrines 21; Rebs: Jawai, Tomić 8 Asts: Jasikevičius 4		Pts: Smith, Hickman 16; Rebs: Smith, James 7 Asts: James, Logan 3

Palau Blaugrana, Barcelona
Attendance: 5,199
Referees: Luigi Lamonica (ITA), Milivoje Jovcic (SRB), Jakub Zamojski (POL)

5 April 2013
19:30

Report

Beşiktaş J.K. İstanbul (Turkey)	80–73	(Turkey) Fenerbahçe Ülker
Scoring by quarter: 17–27, 16–19, 26–13, 21–14
Pts: Ewing 17; Rebs: Ewing 8 Asts: Ewing, Vidmar 4		Pts: Savaş 14; Rebs: Karaman 6 Asts: Ermiş 4

Abdi İpekçi Arena, Istanbul
Attendance: 5,570
Referees: Jose Ramon Garcia Ortiz (ESP), Marko Juras (SRB), Tomas Jasevicius (LTU)
