= 2014–15 Euroleague Quarterfinals =

Results for the Quarterfinals, also called the Playoffs of the 2014–15 Euroleague basketball tournament.

The quarterfinals will be played in April 2015. Team #1 (i.e., the group winner in each series) will host Games 1 and 2, plus Game 5 if it is necessary. Team #2 will host Game 3, plus Game 4 if necessary.

== Summary ==
Team 1	Agg.	Team 2	Game 1	Game 2	Game 3	Game 4
Real Madrid (Spain)	3–1	(Turkey) Anadolu Efes	80–71	90–85	72–75	76–63
CSKA Moscow (Russia)	3–1	(Greece) Panathinaikos	93–66	100–80	85–86	74–55
FC Barcelona (Spain)	1–3	(Greece) Olympiacos	73–57	63–76	71–73	68–71
Fenerbahçe Ülker (Turkey)	3–0	(Israel) Maccabi Tel Aviv	80–72	82–67	75–74	

== Game 1 ==
14 April 2015
19:00

Report

CSKA Moscow (Russia)	93–66	(Greece) Panathinaikos
Scoring by quarter: 29–21, 27–6, 21–15, 16–24
Pts: Teodosić 18; Rebs: Weems 5 Asts: Teodosić 8		Pts: Pappas 16; Rebs: Pappas 4 Asts: Janković, Diamantidis, Lountzis 3

Universal Sports Hall, Moscow
Attendance: 4,384 (Tentative)
Referees: Luigi Lamonica (ITA), Vicente Bultó (ESP), Carlos Peruga (ESP)

14 April 2015
20:00

Report

Fenerbahçe Ülker (Turkey)	80–72	(Israel) Maccabi Tel Aviv
Scoring by quarter: 16–22, 22–20, 21–16, 21–14
Pts: Veselý 23; Rebs: Bjelica 12; Asts: Preldžić 5		Pts: Pargo 25; Rebs: Tyus 11; Asts: Pargo 8

Ülker Sports Arena, Istanbul
Attendance: 12,894 (Tentative)
Referees: Christos Christodoulou (GRE), Antonio Conde (ESP), Joseph Bissang (FRA)

15 April 2015
19:00

Report

FC Barcelona (Spain)	73–57	(Greece) Olympiacos
Scoring by quarter: 20–8, 15–18, 15–12, 23–19
Pts: Nachbar, Navarro 10; Rebs: Lampe 9 Asts: Huertas 4		Pts: Agravanis 9 Rebs: Dunston 4 Asts: Sloukas 4

Palau Blaugrana, Barcelona
Attendance: 4,428 (Tentative)
Referees: Borys Ryzhyk (UKR), Recep Ankarali (TUR), Olegs Latisevs (LAT)

15 April 2015
21:00

Report

Real Madrid (Spain)	80–71	(Turkey) Anadolu Efes
Scoring by quarter: 22–20, 13–23, 26–10, 19–18
Pts: Rivers 21; Rebs: Ayón 10; Asts: Llull 7		Pts: Šarić 13; Rebs: Krstić 6 Asts: Heurtel 11

Palacio de Deportes, Madrid
Attendance: 9,127 (Tentative)
Referees: Sasa Pukl (SLO), Spiros Gkontas (GRE), Carmelo Paternico (ITA)

== Game 2 ==
16 April 2015
19:00

Report

CSKA Moscow (Russia)	100–80	(Greece) Panathinaikos
Scoring by quarter: 21–14, 26–21, 25–19, 28–26
Pts: Weems 20; Rebs: Kirilenko, Vorontsevich 4 Asts: Teodosić 8		Pts: Charalampopoulos 14; Rebs: Fotsis 5 Asts: Diamantidis 6

Universal Sports Hall, Moscow
Attendance: 4,611 (Tentative)
Referees: Ilija Belosevic (SRB), Daniel Hierrezuelo (ESP), Piotr Pastusiak (POL)

16 April 2015
20:00

Report

Fenerbahçe Ülker (Turkey)	82–67	(Israel) Maccabi Tel Aviv
Scoring by quarter: 30–14, 20–20, 18–19, 14–14
Pts: Goudelock 19; Rebs: Bjelica 15; Asts: Preldžić, Zisis 4		Pts: Pargo 16; Rebs: Linhart, Tyus, Randle 5 Asts: Pargo, Randle 4

Ülker Sports Arena, Istanbul
Attendance: 12,907 (Tentative)
Referees: Sreten Radovic (CRO), Panagiotis Anastopoulos (GRE), Benjamín Jiménez (ESP)

17 April 2015
19:00

Report

Real Madrid (Spain)	90–85	(Turkey) Anadolu Efes
Scoring by quarter: 22–16, 15–29, 26–21, 27–19
Pts: Llull 18; Rebs: Ayón 4 Asts: Llull 12		Pts: Krstić 23; Rebs: Šarić 9 Asts: Heurtel 15

Palacio de Deportes, Madrid
Attendance: 10,329 (Tentative)
Referees: Fernando Rocha (POR), Jakub Zamojski (POL), Matej Boltauzer (SLO)

17 April 2015
21:00

Report

FC Barcelona (Spain)	63–76	(Greece) Olympiacos
Scoring by quarter: 10–15, 15–20, 20–21, 18–20
Pts: Navarro 16; Rebs: Tomić 14; Asts: Tomić 3		Pts: Printezis 22; Rebs: Printezis 9 Asts: Spanoulis 5

Palau Blaugrana, Barcelona
Attendance: 6,171 (Tentative)
Referees: Robert Lottermoser (GER), Tolga Sahin (ITA), Rustu Nuran (TUR)

== Game 3 ==
20 April 2015
20:05

Report

Maccabi Tel Aviv (Israel)	74–75 (OT)	(Turkey) Fenerbahçe Ülker
Scoring by quarter: 20–13, 11–24, 14–13, 20–15, Overtime: 9–10
Pts: Pargo 21; Rebs: Randle 10; Asts: Ohayon 4		Pts: Zisis 19; Rebs: Preldžić 9 Asts: Zisis 5

Menora Mivtachim Arena, Tel Aviv
Attendance: 10,728 (Tentative)
Referees: Borys Ryzhyk (UKR), Juan Carlos García González (ESP), Elias Koromilas (GRE)

20 April 2015
20:45

Report

Panathinaikos (Greece)	86–85	(Russia) CSKA Moscow
Scoring by quarter: 14–20, 20–14, 22–19, 30–32
Pts: Pappas 25; Rebs: Gist 5 Asts: Diamantidis 7		Pts: Weems 24; Rebs: Kirilenko 7 Asts: Teodosić 9

O.A.C.A., Athens
Attendance: 12,500 (Tentative)
Referees: Sreten Radovic (CRO), Recep Ankarali (TUR), Damir Javor (SLO)

21 April 2015
19:00

Report

Olympiacos (Greece)	73–71	(Spain) FC Barcelona
Scoring by quarter: 26–23, 18–13, 15–24, 14–11
Pts: Printezis 19; Rebs: Hunter 7 Asts: Spanoulis 8		Pts: Navarro 14; Rebs: Lampe, Tomić 5 Asts: Huertas, Navarro 6

Peace and Friendship Stadium, Piraeus
Attendance: 11,500 (Tentative)
Referees: Ilija Belosevic (SRB), Fernando Rocha (POR), Milija Vojinovic (SRB)

21 April 2015
20:45

Report

Anadolu Efes (Turkey)	75–72	(Spain) Real Madrid
Scoring by quarter: 15–20, 17–10, 24–16, 19–26
Pts: Janning 21; Rebs: Šarić 15; Asts: Heurtel 5		Pts: Rodríguez 17; Rebs: Ayón, Rodríguez 4 Asts: Llull 5

Abdi İpekçi Arena, Istanbul
Attendance: 9,077 (Tentative)
Referees: Luigi Lamonica (ITA), Olegs Latisevs (LAT), Milos Koljensic (MNE)

== Game 4 ==
22 April 2015
20:45

Report

Panathinaikos (Greece)	55–74	(Russia) CSKA Moscow
Scoring by quarter: 11–21, 21–16, 12–23, 11–14
Pts: Pappas 11; Rebs: Janković 7 Asts: Diamantidis 5		Pts: de Colo 18; Rebs: Kirilenko 10; Asts: Weems 4

O.A.C.A., Athens
Attendance: 16,000 (Tentative)
Referees: Sasa Pukl (SLO), Tolga Sahin (ITA), Emilio Perez Pizarro (ESP)

23 April 2015
19:00

Report

Anadolu Efes (Turkey)	63–76	(Spain) Real Madrid
Scoring by quarter: 21–18, 18–15, 10–18, 14–25
Pts: Krstić 16; Rebs: Šarić 12; Asts: Šarić 5		Pts: Fernández 17; Rebs: Reyes 7 Asts: Llull 5

Abdi İpekçi Arena, Istanbul
Attendance: 11,093 (Tentative)
Referees: Christos Christodoulou (GRE), Robert Lottermoser (GER), Paolo Taurino (ITA)

23 April 2015
21:00

Report

Olympiacos (Greece)	71–68	(Spain) FC Barcelona
Scoring by quarter: 16–17, 13–20, 21–13, 21–18
Pts: Spanoulis 17; Rebs: Hunter 8 Asts: Spanoulis 5		Pts: Tomić 13; Rebs: Pleiß, Satoranský, Tomić 7 Asts: Huertas, Navarro, Satoranský 3

Peace and Friendship Stadium, Piraeus
Attendance: 11,500 (Tentative)
Referees: Milivoje Jovcic (SRB), Eddie Viator (FRA), Jakub Zamojski (POL)
