= 2014–15 Euroleague =

European professional basketball competition

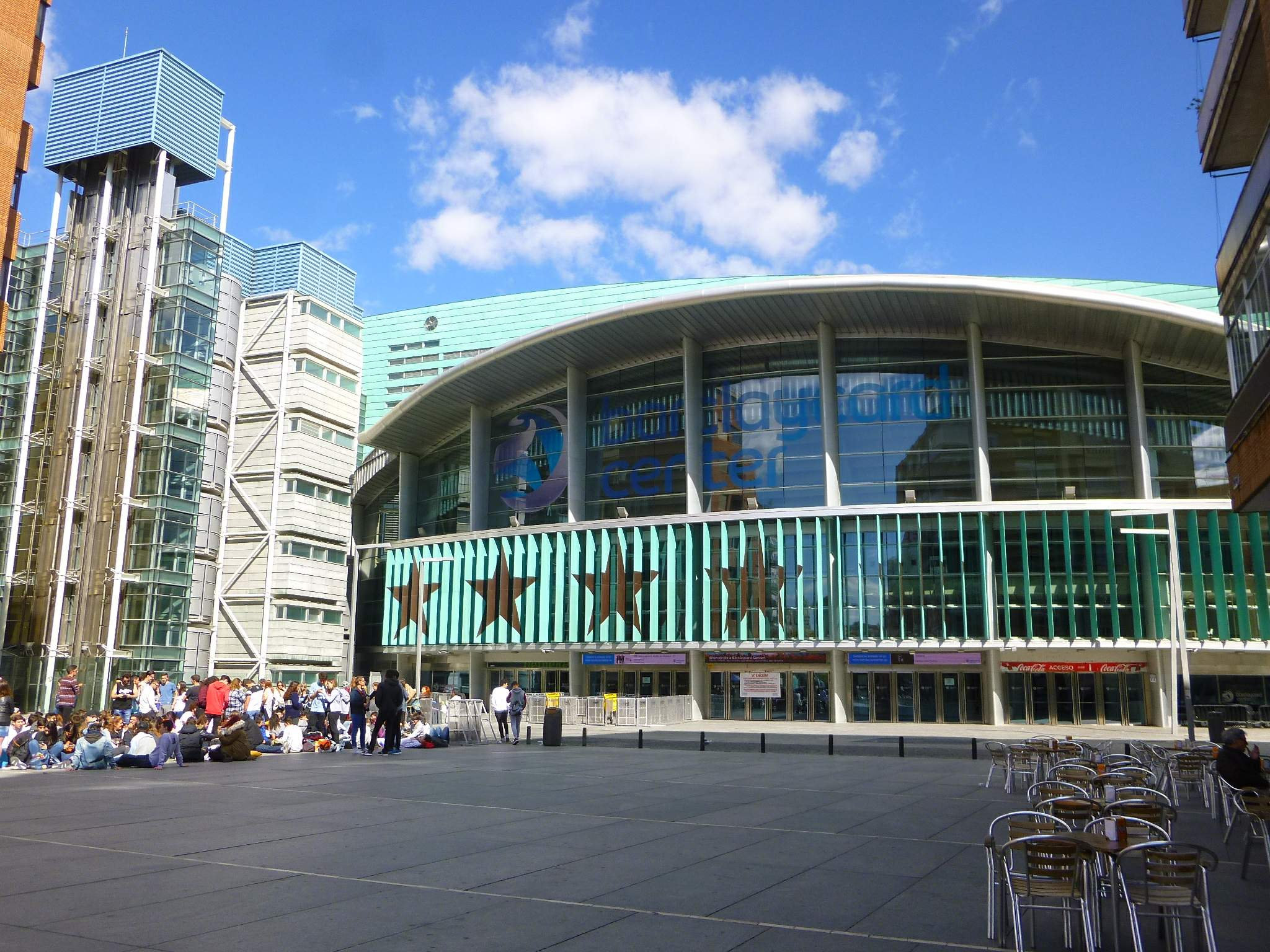
- The Barclaycard Center in Madrid hosted the Final Four
- Season: 2014–15
- Duration: 16 October 2014 – 17 May 2015
- Games played: 251
- Teams: 24

Regular season
- Season MVP: (Serbia) Nemanja Bjelica

Finals
- Champions: (Spain) Real Madrid (9th title)
- Runners-up: (Greece) Olympiacos
- Third place: (Russia) CSKA Moscow
- Fourth place: (Turkey) Fenerbahçe Ülker
- Final Four MVP: (Argentina) Andrés Nocioni

Awards
- Best Defender: (United States) Bryant Dunston
- Rising Star: (Serbia) Bogdan Bogdanović
- Coach of the Year: (Spain) Pablo Laso

Statistical leaders
Points	(Montenegro) Taylor Rochestie	18.9
Rebounds	(Serbia) Boban Marjanović	10.6
Assists	(Serbia) Miloš Teodosić	7.0
Index Rating	(Serbia) Boban Marjanović	25.7

Records
- Biggest home win: Valencia 103–65 Neptūnas
- Biggest away win: PGE Turów 65–104 Barcelona
- Highest scoring: Galatasaray 110–103 Crvena Zvezda
- Highest attendance: 18,733 (Crvena Zvezda 72–79 Real Madrid)
- Lowest attendance: 534 (UNICS 85–62 Dinamo Sassari)
- Attendance: 2,013,305
- Average attendance: 8,184 ▲

The 2014–15 Turkish Airlines Euroleague was the 15th season of the modern era of EuroLeague basketball and the fifth under the title sponsorship of the Turkish Airlines. Including the competition's previous iteration as the FIBA Europe Champions Cup, this was the 58th season of the premier competition for European men's clubs.

The city of Madrid hosted the Final Four from May 15 to 17, 2015.

== Allocation ==
There were three routes to participation in the Euroleague:

- The 12 teams with an A-Licence from the 2013–14 Euroleague, based on their Euroleague Club Ranking.
- The 2013–14 Eurocup winner was given a C-Licence.
- The rest of the teams places were allocated from a list of 28 teams given a B-Licence ranked according to their European national basketball league rankings over the last year. 13 teams were given both an A-Licence or C-Licence and a B-Licence. When a country ranking spot had already been assigned to an A-Licence team, the assignation jumped to the next country appearing in the ranking, and their league was not granted an additional place in the competition. At least the first 9 of the remaining 16 teams were given places in the regular-season, and the next 6 were given places in the qualifying competition.
- If the Eurocup champion was qualified by receiving a B licence or some team with it resigned from the competition, a wild card had to be given by the Euroleague.

The Euroleague had the right to cancel an A licence for one of the following reasons:

- The club had the lowest ranking of all clubs with an A Licence, according to the Club Ranking.
- The club had ranked among the clubs placed in the bottom half of the national championship final standings.
- The club had financial problems.
- In Spanish League, when the champion and/or the runner-up of the league were teams without an A licence. In that case, the A licence club with the lowest position would play in Eurocup in the next season. If that happened three times in five years, the A licence of the club would have been cancelled.

=== Euroleague allocation criteria ===
==== A licences ====
Classification after the 2013–14 Euroleague, including also the 2011–12 and the 2012–13 seasons.

Rank	Team	Points
1.	(Russia) CSKA Moscow	164
2.	(Spain) FC Barcelona	163
3.	(Greece) Olympiacos	154
4.	(Spain) Real Madrid	148
5.	(Israel) Maccabi Electra	141
6.	(Greece) Panathinaikos	139

Rank	Team	Points
7.	(Turkey) Anadolu Efes	105
8.	(Spain) Unicaja	100
9.	(Turkey) Fenerbahçe Ülker	99
10.	(Spain) Laboral Kutxa	97
11.	(Lithuania) Žalgiris	95
12.	(Italy) EA7 Milano	86

- The A licence of EA7 Milano expired in June 2014, but Euroleague confirmed it as an A licensed team.
- Montepaschi Siena did not play in the Euroleague, due to financial troubles.

==== B licences ====
B licences could be given to every team without an A licence. If in the allocation appeared a team with A licence, the next team in the criteria would receive the B licence, which qualified directly to the Regular Season.

Key to colors
A licensed teams
B licensed teams
Wild cards
Teams qualified for the Qualifying Round

Team		Pos.
1.	(Spain) FC Barcelona	1st
2.	(Russia) CSKA Moscow	1st
3.	(Italy) EA7 Milano	1st
4.	(Turkey) Fenerbahçe Ülker	1st
5.	(Lithuania) Žalgiris	1st
6.	(Greece) Panathinaikos	1st
7.	(France) Limoges	1st
8.	(Germany) Bayern Munich	1st
9.	(Croatia) Cibona (withdrew)	1st
10.	(Poland) PGE Turów Zgorzelec	1st
11.	(Croatia) Cedevita	2nd
12.	(Spain) Real Madrid	2nd
13.	(Russia) Nizhny Novgorod	2nd
14.	(Italy) Montepaschi Siena (withdrew)	2nd

Team		Pos.
15.	(Turkey) Galatasaray	2nd
16.	(Lithuania) Neptūnas	2nd
17.	(Greece) Olympiacos	2nd
18.	(France) Strasbourg	2nd
19.	(Germany) Alba Berlin	2nd
20.	(Serbia) Crvena Zvezda	3rd
21.	(Ukraine) Budivelnyk (withdrew)	1st
22.	(Czech Republic) ČEZ Nymburk	1st
23.	(Belgium) Telenet Oostende	1st
24.	(Israel) Maccabi Electra	1st
25.	(Bulgaria) Levski Sofia (rejected)	1st
26.	(Latvia) Ventspils	1st
27.	(United Kingdom) Worcester Wolves	1st
28.	(Poland) Stelmet Zielona Góra	2nd

Notes:
- Teams from Serbia and Croatia qualified through ABA League, and not through their national leagues.

==== C licence, replacements and wildcards ====
To the regular season

- (Spain) Valencia (C licence as 2013–14 Eurocup winner)
- (Germany) Alba Berlin (one-year wildcard which substituted Asseco Prokom's A-Licence removed in 2013)
- (Italy) Dinamo Sassari (one-year wildcard which substituted Montepaschi Siena's A-licence, after it resigned in 2014)
- (Serbia) Crvena Zvezda (one-year wildcard which substituted Cibona's B-licence)

To the qualifying rounds

- (Russia) UNICS (as 2013–14 VTB League best qualified without A or B licence)
- (Israel) Hapoel Jerusalem (wildcard)
- (France) ASVEL (wildcard)
- (Latvia) VEF Rīga (wildcard after the rejection of Levski Sofia)

== Teams ==
The participating teams for the season were announced on June 25, 2014.

The labels in the parentheses show how each team qualified for the place of its starting round (TH: EuroLeague title holders)

- A - licensed clubs: teams with 3-year licence
- Associated clubs: teams with B and C temporary licenses
- 1st, 2nd, etc.: League position after Playoffs
- EC: Champion of the 2013–14 Eurocup
- WC: Wild card
- Bold: Qualification round winner

Regular season
**A-license**
(Spain) FC Barcelona (1st)	(Greece) Olympiacos (2nd)	(Lithuania) Žalgiris (1st)
(Spain) Real Madrid (2nd)	(Turkey) Fenerbahçe Ülker (1st)	(Russia) CSKA Moscow (1st)
(Spain) Unicaja (4th)	(Turkey) Anadolu Efes (5th)	
(Spain) Laboral Kutxa (6th)	(Israel) Maccabi Electra (1st)^{TH}	
(Greece) Panathinaikos (1st)	EA7 Emporio Armani Milano (1st)	
**Associated clubs**
(Croatia) Cedevita (2nd)	(Germany) Bayern Munich (1st)	(Lithuania) Neptūnas (2nd)
(Serbia) Crvena zvezda (WC)	(Germany) ALBA Berlin (2nd)^{(WC)}	(Russia) Nizhny Novgorod (2nd)
(Spain) Valencia (3rd)^{(EC)}	(Turkey) Galatasaray Liv Hospital (2nd)	(Poland) PGE Turów Zgorzelec (1st)
(France) Limoges (1st)	(Italy) Banco di Sardegna Sassari (3rd)^{(WC)}	
Qualifying rounds
(France) SIG Strasbourg (2nd)	(Israel) Hapoel Jerusalem (3rd)^{(WC)}	(Russia) UNICS (3rd)^{(WC)}
(France) ASVEL (7th)^{(WC)}	(Czech Republic) ČEZ Nymburk (1st)	(Poland) Stelmet Zielona Góra (2nd)
(Belgium) Telenet Oostende (1st)	(Latvia) VEF Rīga (2nd)^{WC}	

== Qualifying rounds ==
Eight teams participated in a single-venue tournament format that took place in Ostend, Belgium, from 23 to 26 September. The winner advanced to the Euroleague regular season.

Round 1
1	(Russia) UNICS	90
4	(Poland) Stelmet Zielona Góra	86
2	(Israel) Hapoel Jerusalem	94
3	(Czech Republic) ČEZ Nymburk	84
2	(France) ASVEL	86
3	(Belgium) Telenet Oostend	77
1	(Latvia) VEF Rīga	53
4	(France) Strasbourg	82

Round 2
1	(Russia) UNICS	82
2	(Israel) Hapoel Jerusalem	71
2	(France) ASVEL	74
4	(France) Strasbourg	65

Round 3
1	(Russia) UNICS	88
2	(France) ASVEL	79

== Draw ==
Teams were seeded into six pots of four teams in accordance with the Club Ranking, based on their performance in European competitions during a three-year period.

Two teams from the same country or league could not be drawn together in the same Regular Season group. In brackets, the points in the Club Ranking. Following the Eurocup bylaws, the lowest possible position that any club from that country or league could occupy in the draw was calculated by adding the results of the worst performing team from each league.

Pot 1	Pot 2	Pot 3	Pot 4	Pot 5	Pot 6
(Russia) CSKA Moscow (Spain) FC Barcelona (Greece) Olympiacos (Spain) Real Madrid	(Israel) Maccabi Electra (Greece) Panathinaikos (Spain) Valencia (Turkey) Anadolu Efes	(Spain) Unicaja (Turkey) Fenerbahçe Ülker (Spain) Laboral Kutxa (Lithuania) Žalgiris	(Germany) Alba Berlin (Turkey) Galatasaray (Italy) EA7 Milano (Russia) Nizhny Novgorod †	(Serbia) Crvena Zvezda (Croatia) Cedevita (Germany) Bayern Munich (Italy) Dinamo Sassari	(Poland) PGE Turów † (Lithuania) Neptūnas † (France) Limoges † (Russia) UNICS ^

Notes:
- † indicates teams with points applying the minimum for the league they play.
- ^ indicates team qualified through the qualifying rounds

== Regular season ==
Location of teams of the 2014–15 Euroleague group stage.
Red: Group A; Green: Group B; Blue: Group C; Yellow: Group D.

The regular season was played between October 16 and December 19.

If teams were level on record at the end of the Regular Season, tiebreakers were applied in the following order:

1. Head-to-head record.
2. Head-to-head point differential.
3. Point differential during the Regular Season.
4. Points scored during the regular season.
5. Sum of quotients of points scored and points allowed in each Regular Season game.

Key to colors
Top four places in each group advanced to
Bottom two teams in each group entered 2014–15 Eurocup Last 32 round

=== Group A ===
Pos	Team	Pld	W	L	PF	PA	PD
1	(Spain) Real Madrid (A)	10	8	2	873	775	+98
2	(Turkey) Anadolu Efes (A)	10	6	4	723	696	+27
3	(Lithuania) Žalgiris (A)	10	5 (Note: Tie breaker: 3–1)	5	714	709	+5
4	(Russia) Nizhny Novgorod (A)	10	5 (Note: Tie breaker: 2–2)	5	764	823	−59
5	(Russia) UNICS (E)	10	5 (Note: Tie breaker: 1–3)	5	751	721	+30
6	(Italy) Dinamo Sassari (E)	10	1	9	758	859	−101

(A) Advance to Top 16; (E) Enter 2014–15 Eurocup Basketball last 32 round

=== Group B ===
Pos	Team	Pld	W	L	PF	PA	PD
1	(Russia) CSKA Moscow (A)	10	10	0	880	718	+162
2	(Israel) Maccabi Tel Aviv (A)	10	7	3	797	783	+14
3	(Spain) Unicaja (A)	10	4 (Note: Tiebreaker: 1–1 (+2))	6	763	757	+6
4	(Germany) Alba Berlin (A)	10	4 (Note: Tiebreaker: 1–1 (–2))	6	762	791	−29
5	(Croatia) Cedevita (E)	10	3	7	740	789	−49
6	(France) Limoges (E)	10	2	8	702	806	−104

(A) Advance to Top 16; (E) Enter 2014–15 Eurocup Basketball last 32 round

=== Group C ===
Pos	Team	Pld	W	L	PF	PA	PD
1	(Spain) FC Barcelona (A)	10	9	1	861	738	+123
2	(Turkey) Fenerbahçe Ülker (A)	10	8	2	843	787	+56
3	(Greece) Panathinaikos (A)	10	5 (Note: Tiebreaker: 1–1 (+25))	5	768	743	+25
4	(Italy) EA7 Milano (A)	10	5 (Note: Tiebreaker: 1–1 (–25))	5	775	795	−20
5	(Germany) Bayern Munich (E)	10	2	8	806	866	−60
6	(Poland) PGE Turów (E)	10	1	9	773	897	−124

(A) Advance to Top 16; (E) Enter 2014–15 Eurocup Basketball last 32 round

=== Group D ===
Pos	Team	Pld	W	L	PF	PA	PD
1	(Greece) Olympiacos (A)	10	8	2	748	711	+37
2	(Serbia) Crvena Zvezda (A)	10	6	4	784	728	+56
3	(Spain) Laboral Kutxa (A)	10	5	5	803	798	+5
4	(Turkey) Galatasaray Liv Hospital (A)	10	4 (Note: Tiebreaker: 1–1 (+16))	6	803	818	−15
5	(Lithuania) Neptūnas (E)	10	4 (Note: Tiebreaker: 1–1 (–16))	6	763	857	−94
6	(Spain) Valencia (E)	10	3	7	775	764	+11

(A) Advance to Top 16; (E) Enter 2014–15 Eurocup Basketball last 32 round

== Top 16 ==
The Top 16 began on December 30 and ended on April 10, 2015.

If teams were level on record at the end of the Top 16, tiebreakers were applied in the following order:

1. Head-to-head record between teams still tied.
2. Head-to-head point differential.
3. Point differential during the Top 16.
4. Points scored during the Top 16.
5. Sum of quotients of points scored and points allowed in each Top 16 game.

Key to colors
Top four places in each group advanced to Playoffs
Eliminated

See the detailed group stage page for tiebreakers if two or more teams are equal on points.

=== Group E ===
Pos	Team	Pld	W	L	PF	PA	PD
1	(Spain) Real Madrid (A)	14	11 (Note: Tiebreaker: 1–1 (+19))	3	1224	1032	+192
2	(Spain) FC Barcelona (A)	14	11 (Note: Tiebreaker: 1–1 (–19))	3	1149	1062	+87
3	(Israel) Maccabi Tel Aviv (A)	14	9	5	1071	1072	−1
4	(Greece) Panathinaikos (A)	14	7 (Note: Tiebreaker: 1–1 (+4))	7	1048	1022	+26
5	(Germany) Alba Berlin (E)	14	7 (Note: Tiebreaker: 1–1 (–4))	7	976	1031	−55
6	(Lithuania) Žalgiris (E)	14	5	9	1004	1075	−71
7	(Serbia) Crvena Zvezda (E)	14	4	10	1025	1059	−34
8	(Turkey) Galatasaray (E)	14	2	12	1023	1167	−144

(A) Advance to Playoffs; (E) Eliminated

=== Group F ===
Pos	Team	Pld	W	L	PF	PA	PD
1	(Russia) CSKA Moscow (A)	14	12	2	1227	1114	+113
2	(Turkey) Fenerbahçe Ülker (A)	14	11	3	1126	1033	+93
3	(Greece) Olympiacos (A)	14	10	4	1075	1007	+68
4	(Turkey) Anadolu Efes (A)	14	6 (Note: Tiebreaker: 1–1 (+2))	8	1102	1132	−30
5	(Spain) Laboral Kutxa (E)	14	6 (Note: Tiebreaker: 1–1 (–2))	8	1155	1164	−9
6	(Italy) EA7 Milano (E)	14	4 (Note: Tiebreaker: 2–0)	10	1083	1193	−110
7	(Spain) Unicaja (E)	14	4 (Note: Tiebreaker: 0–2)	10	1079	1140	−61
8	(Russia) Nizhny Novgorod (E)	14	3	11	1121	1185	−64

(A) Advance to Playoffs; (E) Eliminated

== Quarterfinals ==
Team 1	Agg.	Team 2	Game 1	Game 2	Game 3	Game 4
Real Madrid (Spain)	3–1	(Turkey) Anadolu Efes	80–71	90–85	72–75	76–63
CSKA Moscow (Russia)	3–1	(Greece) Panathinaikos	93–66	100–80	85–86	74–55
FC Barcelona (Spain)	1–3	(Greece) Olympiacos	73–57	63–76	71–73	68–71
Fenerbahçe Ülker (Turkey)	3–0	(Israel) Maccabi Tel Aviv	80–72	82–67	75–74	

== Final Four ==
The Final Four was the last stage of the Euroleague, consisting of the four winners from the quarterfinals. The semifinal games were played on 15 May, while the third place game and championship game were played on 17 May 2015. The Final Four was hosted by the Barclaycard Center in Madrid, Spain.

Semifinals
15 May
(Spain) Real Madrid	96
(Turkey) Fenerbahçe Ülker	87
15 May
(Russia) CSKA Moscow	68
(Greece) Olympiacos	70

Championship game
17 May
(Spain) Real Madrid	78
(Greece) Olympiacos	59
Third place game
17 May
(Turkey) Fenerbahçe Ülker	80
(Russia) CSKA Moscow	86

== Attendances ==
=== Average home attendances ===
Pos	Team	GP	Total	High	Low	Average
1	(Serbia) Crvena Zvezda	11	159,309	18,733	5,908	14,483
2	(Greece) Panathinaikos	14	177,418	16,033	8,165	12,672
3	(Turkey) Fenerbahçe	14	164,449	13,013	8,559	11,746
4	(Israel) Maccabi Electra	13	143,780	11,060	11,060	11,060
5	(Germany) Alba Berlin	12	123,561	14,133	8,226	10,296
6	(Lithuania) Žalgiris	12	121,835	14,382	4,795	10,153
7	(Spain) Laboral Kutxa	12	117,882	12,619	7,689	9,824
8	(Greece) Olympiacos	14	125,907	11,653	6,039	8,993
9	(Spain) Real Madrid	14	123,902	12,662	7,806	8,850
10	(Italy) EA7 Milano	12	98,703	10,169	6,344	8,225
11	(Turkey) Galatasaray	8	60,512	11,312	3,138	7,564
12	(Spain) Unicaja	12	87,893	8,891	5,237	7,324
13	(Spain) FC Barcelona	14	94,103	8,529	5,162	6,721
14	(Turkey) Anadolu Efes	14	85,495	10,174	2,529	6,106
15	(Germany) Bayern Munich	5	30,135	6,688	5,047	6,027
16	(Spain) Valencia	5	30,069	8,500	3,005	6,014
17	(Lithuania) Neptūnas	5	27,348	5,669	5,309	5,470
18	(Russia) CSKA Moscow	14	65,509	5,349	4,369	4,679
19	(France) Limoges	5	23,292	5,080	4,356	4,658
20	(Italy) Dinamo Sassari	5	18,901	4,483	3,068	3,780
21	(Croatia) Cedevita	5	18,811	4,091	3,288	3,762
22	(Russia) UNICS	5	14,490	3,876	534	2,898
23	(Russia) Nizhny Novgorod	12	27,740	3,393	1,492	2,312
24	(Poland) PGE Turów	5	9,744	3,217	709	1,949

- Updated on 5 May 2015 (ALL GAMES PLAYED)
Source: Euroleague Basketball

=== Top 10 ===
	Round	Game	Home team	Visitor	Attendance	Ref
1	Top 16	1	(Serbia) Crvena Zvezda	(Spain) Real Madrid	18,733	
2	Regular Season	4	(Serbia) Crvena Zvezda	(Greece) Olympiacos	18,732	
3	Top 16	11	(Serbia) Crvena Zvezda	(Spain) FC Barcelona	18,450	
4	Top 16	6	(Serbia) Crvena Zvezda	(Lithuania) Žalgiris	18,382	
5	Top 16	3	(Serbia) Crvena Zvezda	(Turkey) Galatasaray	17,821	
6	Regular Season	1	(Serbia) Crvena Zvezda	(Turkey) Galatasaray	16,834	
7	Top 16	9	(Greece) Panathinaikos	(Spain) FC Barcelona	16,033	
8	Play Off	27	(Greece) Panathinaikos	(Russia) CSKA Moscow	16,000	
9	Top 16	11	(Greece) Panathinaikos	(Spain) Real Madrid	14,766	
10	Regular Season	3	(Greece) Panathinaikos	(Turkey) Fenerbahçe Ülker	14,480	

== Individual statistics ==
=== Rating ===
Rank	Name	Team	Games	Rating	PIR
1.	(Serbia) Boban Marjanović	(Serbia) Crvena Zvezda	24	616	25.67
2.	(Montenegro) Taylor Rochestie	(Russia) Nizhny Novgorod	21	442	21.05
3.	(Belarus) Artsiom Parakhouski	(Russia) Nizhny Novgorod	23	426	18.52

=== Points ===
Rank	Name	Team	Games	Points	PPG
1.	(Montenegro) Taylor Rochestie	(Russia) Nizhny Novgorod	21	397	18.90
2.	(United States) Andrew Goudelock	(Turkey) Fenerbahçe Ülker	29	493	17.00
3.	(Serbia) Boban Marjanović	(Serbia) Crvena Zvezda	24	398	16.58

=== Rebounds ===
Rank	Name	Team	Games	Rebounds	RPG
1.	(Serbia) Boban Marjanović	(Serbia) Crvena Zvezda	24	256	10.67
2.	(Serbia) Nemanja Bjelica	(Turkey) Fenerbahçe Ülker	29	246	8.48
3.	(United States) Trey Thompkins	(Russia) Nizhny Novgorod	23	187	8.13

=== Assists ===
Rank	Name	Team	Games	Assists	APG
1.	(Serbia) Miloš Teodosić	(Russia) CSKA Moscow	24	168	7.00
2.	(France) Thomas Heurtel	(Turkey) Anadolu Efes	28	179	6.39
3.	(United States) Marcus Williams	(Serbia) Crvena Zvezda	24	146	6.08

=== Other statistics ===
Category	Name	Team	Games	Stat
Steals per game	(United States) Tarence Kinsey	(Russia) Nizhny Novgorod	17	1.59
Blocks per game	(Belarus) Artsiom Parakhouski	(Russia) Nizhny Novgorod	23	1.96
Turnovers per game	(Serbia) Miloš Teodosić	(Russia) CSKA Moscow	24	3.67
Fouls drawn per game	(United States) Jamel McLean	(Germany) Alba Berlin	21	5.81
Minutes per game	(United States) Jeremy Pargo	(Israel) Maccabi Electra	27	31:59
2FG%	(Turkey) Semih Erden	(Turkey) Fenerbahçe Ülker	25	0.758
3FG%	(United States) Demetris Nichols	(Russia) CSKA Moscow	27	0.575
FT%	(Montenegro) Taylor Rochestie	(Russia) Nizhny Novgorod	21	0.925

=== Game highs ===
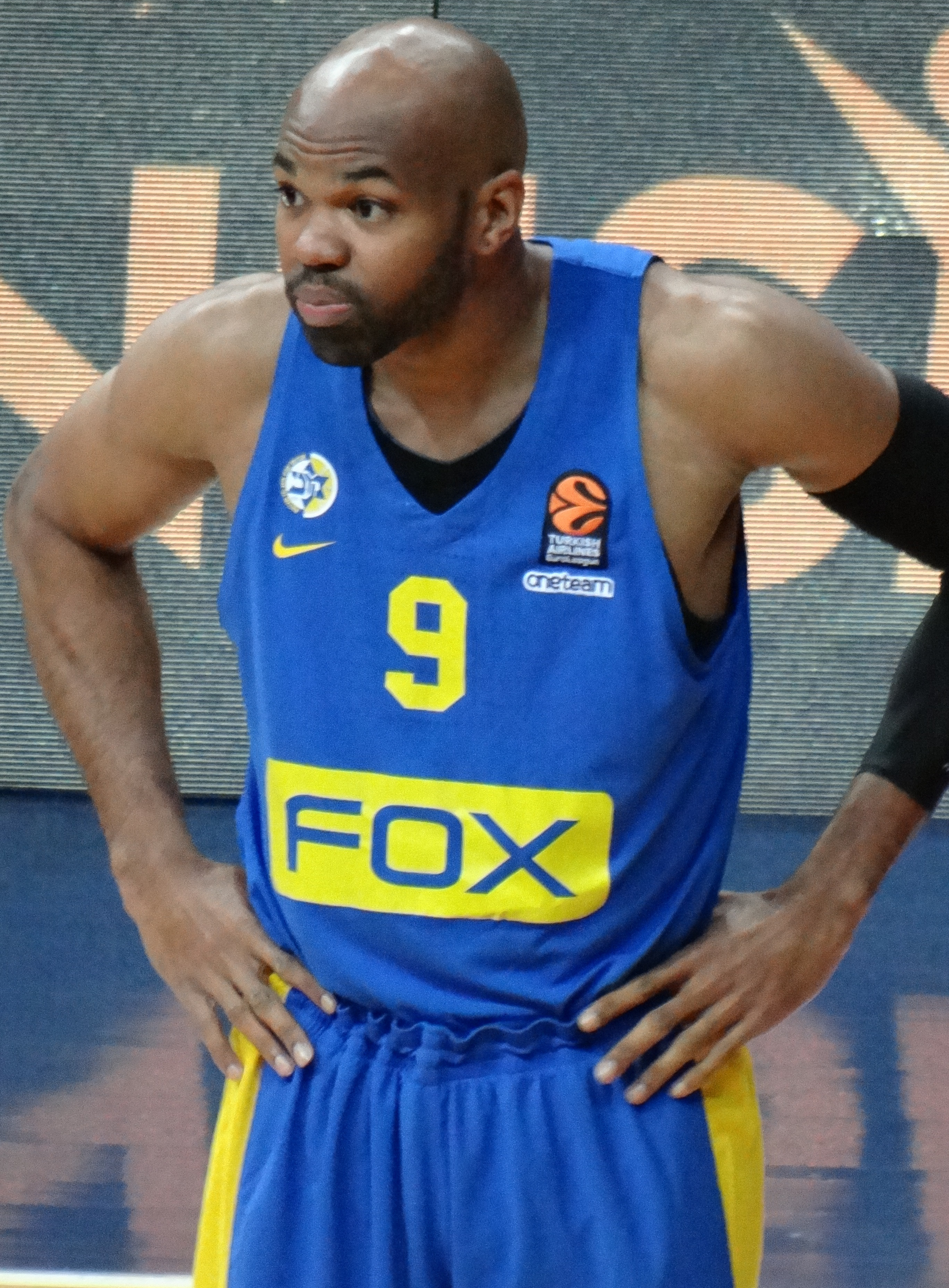
Alex Tyus

Category	Name	Team	Stat
Rating	(Jamaica) Samardo Samuels	(Italy) EA7 Milano	47
Points	(Jamaica) Samardo Samuels	(Italy) EA7 Milano	36
Rebounds	(Serbia) Boban Marjanović	(Serbia) Crvena Zvezda	17
Assists	(United States) Marcus Williams	(Serbia) Crvena Zvezda	17
Steals	(Israel) Yogev Ohayon	(Israel) Maccabi Electra	8
Blocks	(Israel) Alex Tyus	(Israel) Maccabi Electra	6
Blocks	(United States) Brian Randle	(Israel) Maccabi Electra	6
Turnovers	(France) Thomas Heurtel	(Turkey) Anadolu Efes	8
Turnovers	(Montenegro) Taylor Rochestie	(Russia) Nizhny Novgorod	8
Fouls Drawn	3 occasions		12

== Awards ==
=== Euroleague MVP ===
- (Serbia) Nemanja Bjelica ( (Turkey) Fenerbahçe Ülker)

=== Euroleague Final Four MVP ===
- (Argentina) Andrés Nocioni ( (Spain) Real Madrid)

=== All-Euroleague Teams ===
Pos.	First Team		Second Team	
G	(Serbia) Miloš Teodosić	(Russia) CSKA Moscow	(United States) Andrew Goudelock	(Turkey) Fenerbahçe Ülker
G	(Greece) Vassilis Spanoulis	(Greece) Olympiacos	(France) Nando de Colo	(Russia) CSKA Moscow
F	(Serbia) Nemanja Bjelica	(Turkey) Fenerbahçe Ülker	(Spain) Rudy Fernández	(Spain) Real Madrid
F	(Spain) Felipe Reyes	(Spain) Real Madrid	(United States) Devin Smith	(Israel) Maccabi Electra
C	(Serbia) Boban Marjanović	(Serbia) Crvena Zvezda	(Croatia) Ante Tomić	(Spain) FC Barcelona

=== Top Scorer (Alphonso Ford Trophy) ===
- (Montenegro) Taylor Rochestie ( (Russia) Nizhny Novgorod)

=== Best Defender ===
- (United States) Bryant Dunston ( (Greece) Olympiacos)

=== Rising Star ===
- (Serbia) Bogdan Bogdanović ( (Turkey) Fenerbahçe Ülker)

=== Coach of the Year ===
- (Spain) Pablo Laso ( (Spain) Real Madrid)

=== MVP of the Week ===
==== Regular season ====
Game	Player	Team	PIR
1	(Serbia) Boban Marjanović	(Serbia) Crvena Zvezda	30
2	(United States) Andrew Goudelock	(Turkey) Fenerbahçe Ülker	30
3	(Azerbaijan) Jaycee Carroll	(Spain) Real Madrid	37
4	(United States) James Anderson	(Lithuania) Žalgiris	38
5	(United States) Andrew Goudelock (2)	(Turkey) Fenerbahçe Ülker	40
6	(Serbia) Zoran Erceg	(Turkey) Galatasaray	41
7	(Serbia) Boban Marjanović (2)	(Serbia) Crvena Zvezda	36
8	(Israel) D'or Fischer	(Russia) UNICS	43
9	(Serbia) Duško Savanović	(Germany) Bayern Munich	37
10	(Greece) Ioannis Bourousis	(Spain) Real Madrid	31

==== Top 16 ====
Game	Player	Team	PIR
1	(Montenegro) Taylor Rochestie	(Russia) Nizhny Novgorod	32
2	(Spain) Felipe Reyes	(Spain) Real Madrid	29
2	(United States) Brian Randle	(Israel) Maccabi Electra	29
3	(France) Nando de Colo	(Russia) CSKA Moscow	34
4	(Belarus) Artsiom Parakhouski	(Russia) Nizhny Novgorod	37
5	(Croatia) Ante Tomić	(Spain) FC Barcelona	34
6	(Spain) Rudy Fernández	(Spain) Real Madrid	38
7	(France) Nando de Colo (2)	(Russia) CSKA Moscow	29
8	(Jamaica) Samardo Samuels	(Italy) EA7 Milano	47
9	(United States) Reggie Redding	(Germany) Alba Berlin	36
10	(Croatia) Ante Tomić (2)	(Spain) FC Barcelona	35
11	(Serbia) Bogdan Bogdanović	(Turkey) Fenerbahçe Ülker	32
12	(Italy) Alessandro Gentile	(Italy) EA7 Milano	30
13	(United States) Alex Renfroe	(Germany) Alba Berlin	28
14	(United States) Devin Smith	(Israel) Maccabi Electra	28
14	(Serbia) Boban Marjanović (3)	(Serbia) Crvena Zvezda	28

==== Quarter-finals ====
Game	Player	Team	PIR
1	(Mexico) Gustavo Ayón	(Spain) Real Madrid	29
2	(Greece) Georgios Printezis	(Greece) Olympiacos	34
3	(Greece) Nikos Pappas	(Greece) Panathinaikos	31
4	(Russia) Andrei Kirilenko	(Russia) CSKA Moscow	27

=== MVP of the Month ===
Month	Player	Team	Ref.
October 2014	(Greece) Vassilis Spanoulis	(Greece) Olympiacos	
November 2014	(Croatia) Dario Šarić	(Turkey) Anadolu Efes	
December 2014	(United States) Devin Smith	(Israel) Maccabi Electra	
January 2015	(France) Nando de Colo	(Russia) CSKA Moscow	
February 2015	(Spain) Rudy Fernández	(Spain) Real Madrid	
March 2015	(Serbia) Nemanja Bjelica	(Turkey) Fenerbahçe Ülker	
April 2015	(Greece) Georgios Printezis	(Greece) Olympiacos	

== See also ==
- 2014–15 Eurocup Basketball
- 2014–15 EuroChallenge
