= Cunt (disambiguation) =

The word cunt is a vulgarism.

Cunt may also refer to:

- Vulva, the external female genitalia
- Cunt (album), 2000, by Australian grindcore band Blood Duster
- Cunt: A Declaration of Independence, a 1998 feminist book by Inga Muscio
- Cunt: The Movie, a 2006 DVD by Australian students documenting their crimes
- CuNT, a copper nanotube; see Carbon nanotube quantum dot#Other nanotube system

== See also ==
- Cunt splice, between ropes
- Cuntline, along a rope
- Kunt, a Turkish surname
- Kunt and the Gang (born 1973), British musical comedian
- "Gilded Cunt," a song on the 2004 album Nymphetamine by Cradle of Filth
- The Fucking Cunts Treat Us Like Pricks, a 1984 album by Flux of Pink Indians
- Cnut (c. 990 – 1035), northern European king
- See You Next Tuesday (disambiguation), a euphemistic backronym (C.U.N.T.)
