= İbrahim Kutluay =

Turkish basketball player (born 1974)

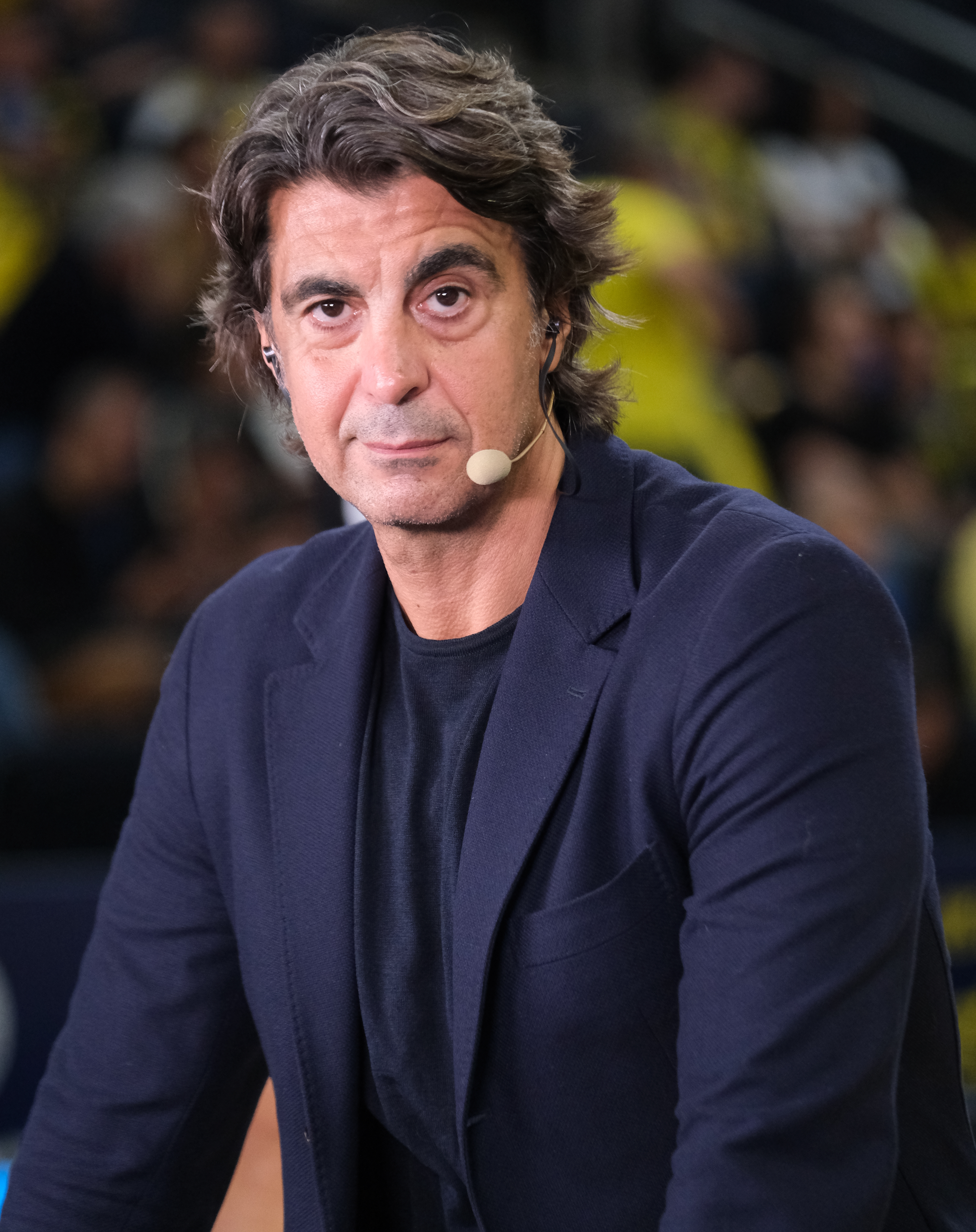
- Kutluay in 2024

Personal information
- Born: 7 December 1974 (age 51) Yalova, Turkey
- Listed height: 6 ft 6 in (1.98 m)
- Listed weight: 200 lb (91 kg)

Career information
- NBA draft: 1996: undrafted
- Playing career: 1991–2009
- Position: Shooting guard / Small forward
- Number: 10, 11, 12

Career history
- 1991–1999: Fenerbahçe
- 1999–2000: Efes Pilsen
- 2000–2001: AEK Athens
- 2001–2003: Panathinaikos
- 2003–2004: Ülkerspor
- 2004–2005: Seattle SuperSonics
- 2005: Panathinaikos
- 2005–2006: Ülkerspor
- 2006–2007: Fenerbahçe Ülker
- 2007–2008: PAOK
- 2008–2009: İTÜ

Career highlights
- As player: EuroLeague champion (2002); FIBA EuroLeague Top Scorer (1999); 4× FIBA EuroStar (1996, 1998, 1999, 2007); FIBA EuroStar 3 Point Contest Champion (1999); 2× Greek League champion (2003, 2005); 3× Greek Cup winner (2001, 2003, 2005); Greek Cup Finals Top Scorer (2001); Greek Cup Finals MVP (2001); 4× Greek League All-Star (2001–2003, 2005); Greek All-Star Game MVP (2002); Greek All-Star Game 3-Point Shootout Champion (2002); 2× Turkish League champion (2006, 2007); Turkish Supercup winner (2005); Turkish Cup winner (2004); Turkish League Top Scorer (1999); 3× Turkish Super League All-Star (2004, 2006, 2007)
- Stats at NBA.com
- Stats at Basketball Reference

İbrahim Kutluay (born 7 December 1974) is a former Turkish professional basketball player who has been a manager and pundit since his retirement. He played the shooting guard position, and in his prime, was one of the most prolific 3-point shooters worldwide. He scored a record 50 points at the 1996 FIBA Europe Under-20 Championship against Italy, and also 41 points in a EuroLeague game against Cibona Zagreb during the 1998–99 season. He was the first Turkish basketball player to win the EuroLeague championship, winning the 2002 EuroLeague Final Four with the Greek club Panathinaikos. Kutluay was the fourth Turk to play in the NBA. He is described as a 'stellar basketball player' whose 'legacy goes beyond his shooting skills, leadership, and incredible talent'. In addition to his professional career, he has also attracted interest as a high society figure due to his fame, wealth and personal life which has continuously been subjected to media scrutiny.

== Professional club career ==
=== Fenerbahçe: 1992–1999 ===
Ibrahim Kutluay is a product of Fenerbahçe. Initially set on becoming a football player, at the age of 13, he made a switch to basketball under the influence of his coaches and family, as it was evident that his growing height, physical attributes and skills would make him naturally disposed to succeed as a basketball player. He progressed through each single stage of the youth sector, and in 1992 was introduced to the A (principal) team of Fenerbahçe by Çetin Yılmaz. In the 1994–1995 season, he made a breakthrough under Murat Didin and established himself as the best scorer of the team. He was the FIBA EuroLeague Top Scorer of the 1998–99 season, with an average of 21.4 points per game.

=== Efes Pilsen: 1999–2000 ===
Kutluay had a successful career at Efes Pilsen with an overall record of 15.1 points, 1.7 rebounds and 2.6 assists per game.

=== Greece and reaching the top of Europe ===
It was in Greece that Kutluay reached the peak of his career. The move to AEK Athens was a very risky one due to the historically troubled relations between Turkey and Greece and at the time of Kutluay's transfer to the Greek club the relations were particularly strained. Ibrahim did prove his worth and won the Greek Cup MVP, in 2001. Whilst playing for Panathinaikos he won the Euroleague in 2002. The final against Kinder Bologna was the game in which he rose to the occasion by displaying all of his great qualities; with 22 points he ended the game as the best scorer of his side.

He later represented Ülkerspor, and İTÜ, in Turkey's BSL and PAOK in Greece's Basket League. He also played in the NBA, with the Seattle SuperSonics.

== National team career ==
Kutluay was a member of the senior Turkish national basketball team. With Turkey, he won a silver medal at the 2001 EuroBasket. He also played at the following tournaments: the 1995 EuroBasket, the 1997 EuroBasket, the 1999 EuroBasket, the 2003 EuroBasket, the 2005 EuroBasket, the 2007 EuroBasket, the 2002 FIBA World Championship, and the 2006 FIBA World Championship.

== Player profile ==
As a 6-foot-6 guard, Kutluay was viewed as one of the best perimeter shooters. Together with Harun Erdenay, Kutluay is ranked amongst the best scorers Turkey has ever produced. Kutluay became the fourth Turkish player to play in NBA, yet he failed to make a success of his career in the US. Kutluay has been praised for his mentality, leadership and modesty throughout his career.

== Post-playing career ==
Kutluay began a career as a sports commentator, after he retired from playing basketball. In 2015, he joined the Turkish club Darüşşafaka, working as the club's manager.

== Personal life and fame ==
=== Partners ===
Kutluay has also been a cynosure of public attention due to his personal life. His relationship with singer Demet Akalın was extensively covered by tabloids. The couple made a decision to formalise their ties with a marriage on 5 July 2001, but according to Akalın, because of Kutluay's last-minute change of mind, they separated. The survey, in which 16,000 respondents took place, conducted by the tabloid Radikal suggests that Kutluay-Akalın couple is remembered the most 'unforgettable duo' of Turkish high-society life.

Kutluay's marriage with another model Demet Şener, in which then Prime Minister Recep Tayyip Erdoğan acted as a witness, was the key event of the Turkish high society life in 2005. The couple divorced in 2018, and Kutluay has since been in an open relationship with a society beauty Edvina Sponza.

Kutluay and Edwina Sponza have been regularly seen in high-end restaurants and clubs together. Ibrahim did attend her father's funeral and was seen supporting her girlfriend at the time of grief. In January 2020, the couple were seen jogging together. Demet Şener criticised Kutluay's late behavior towards her and has given interviews to media explaining her reasons for ending their marriage, but she also praised her former husband as a good father to their children, namely İrem and Ömer.

=== Lifestyle ===
In his interviews, Kutluay mentioned his adherence to healthy routine. He drinks very little and does not have any toxic habits. Despite having retired from the game, Kutluay exercises regularly. He is also distinguished for his impeccable style and taste. Kutluay is a passionate car fan and has had many glamorous sport cars in his possession. Yet due to his height (198 cm), he is reported to have found himself unable to fit into stylish vehicles, thus he often orders specially designed cars to meet his size-related demands.

== Titles and medals won ==
=== Pro clubs ===
- (Greece) AEK Athens (2000–01)
  - Greek Cup: 2001
- (Greece) Panathinaikos (2001–03)
  - EuroLeague: 2002
  - Greek League: 2003
  - Greek Cup: 2003
- (Turkey) Ülkerspor (2003–04)
  - Turkish Cup: 2004
- (Greece) Panathinaikos (2005)
  - Greek League: 2005
  - Greek Cup: 2005
- (Turkey) Ülkerspor (2005–06)
  - Turkish League: 2006
  - Turkish Super Cup: 2005
- (Turkey) Fenerbahçe (2006–07)
  - Turkish League: 2007

=== Turkish senior national team ===
- (Turkey) National Team
  - EuroBasket 2001: Silver

== Individual awards and accomplishments ==
=== Pro career ===
- 1996: FIBA EuroStar, Istanbul.
- 1998: FIBA EuroStar, Berlin.
- 1998–99: FIBA EuroLeague Top Scorer, with a 21.4 scoring average, with Fenerbahçe.
- 1998–99: Turkish League Top Scorer, with Fenerbahçe.
- 1999: FIBA EuroStar, Moscow.
- 1999: FIBA EuroStar 3 Point Contest Champion, Moscow.
- 1999–2000: Third place in 2000 EuroLeague Final Four, with Efes Pilsen.
- 2001: Semifinalist in EuroLeague with AEK Athens.
- 2001: Greek Cup title, with AEK Athens. Voted MVP.
- 2002: EuroLeague title, with Panathinaikos.
- 2003: Greek League title, with Panathinaikos.
- 2005: Third place in 2005 EuroLeague Final Four, with Panathinaikos.
- 2005: Greek League title, with Panathinaikos.
- 2005: Greek Cup title, with Panathinaikos.
- 2005: Turkish President's Cup, with Ülker Istanbul.
- 2007: FIBA EuroStar, Athens.
