= Basketbol Süper Ligi Mr. King =

The Basketbol Süper Ligi Mr. King, is the season scoring leader of the Turkish top-tier level professional club basketball league, the Türkiye Basketbol Süper Ligi (BSL) (English: Turkish Basketball Super League). In basketball, points are the sum of the score accumulated through free throws or field goals. The LNB Pro A's scoring title is awarded to the player with the highest points per game average in a given regular season. Prior to the 1993–94 season, the league's Top Scorer was the player that scored the most total points in the league during the season. Since the 1993–94 season, the league's Top Scorer is the player with the highest scoring average per game during the season.

== Scoring leaders by total points scored (1966–67 to 1992–93) ==
Player (X)	Number of times leading the league

Note: Flags indicate national team eligibility at FIBA-sanctioned events. Players may hold other non-FIBA nationalities not displayed.

Top Scorers By Total Points Scored (1966–67 to 1992–93)
Season	Scoring leader	Team	Total Points Scored	Ref.
1966–67	(Turkey) Hüseyin Alp	Altınordu	553 points	
1967–68	(Turkey) Ümit Nacaroglu	Kurtuluş	657 points	
1968–69	(Turkey) Hüseyin Kozluca	Fenerbahçe	736 points	
1969–70	(Turkey) Firuz Koçaş	Altay	579 points	
1970–71	(Turkey) Barış Küce	Muhafızgücü	652 points	
1971–72	(Turkey) Barış Küce (2)	TED Ankara Kolejliler	718 points	
1972–73	(United States) Tom Davis	Beşiktaş	556 points	
1973–74	(Turkey) Hüseyin Alp (2)	İTÜ		
1974–75	(Turkey) Zeki Tosun	Beşiktaş		
1975–76	(Turkey) Erman Kunter	İTÜ		
1976–77	(Turkey) Zeki Tosun (2)	İTÜ	648 points	
1977–78	(Turkey) Serdar Koçyiğit	DSI Spor	490 points	
1978–79	(Turkey) Erman Kunter (2)	Beşiktaş		
1979–80	(Turkey) Erman Kunter (3)	Beşiktaş	814 points	
1980–81	(Turkey) Erman Kunter (4)	Beşiktaş	848 points	
1981–82	(Turkey) Erman Kunter (5)	Beşiktaş		
1982–83	(United States) Jerry Scott	İTÜ	1,055 points	
1983–84	(United States) Michael Scearce	Güney Sanayi		
1984–85	(United States) Paul Dawkins	Galatasaray		
1985–86	(United States) Paul Dawkins (2)	Galatasaray	602 points	
1986–87	(Jamaica) Michael Kennedy	İTÜ		
1987–88	(Turkey) Erman Kunter (6)	Fenerbahçe	692 points	
1988–89	(Turkey) Hüsnü Çakırgil	Beslenspor	641 points	
1989–90	(Turkey) Harun Erdenay	İTÜ	592 points	
1990–91	(Turkey) Erman Kunter (7)	Beşiktaş		
1991–92	(United States) Mike Cumberland	Beslenspor	750 points	
1992–93	(Turkey) Harun Erdenay (2)	İTÜ		

== Scoring leaders by points per game (1993–94 to present) ==
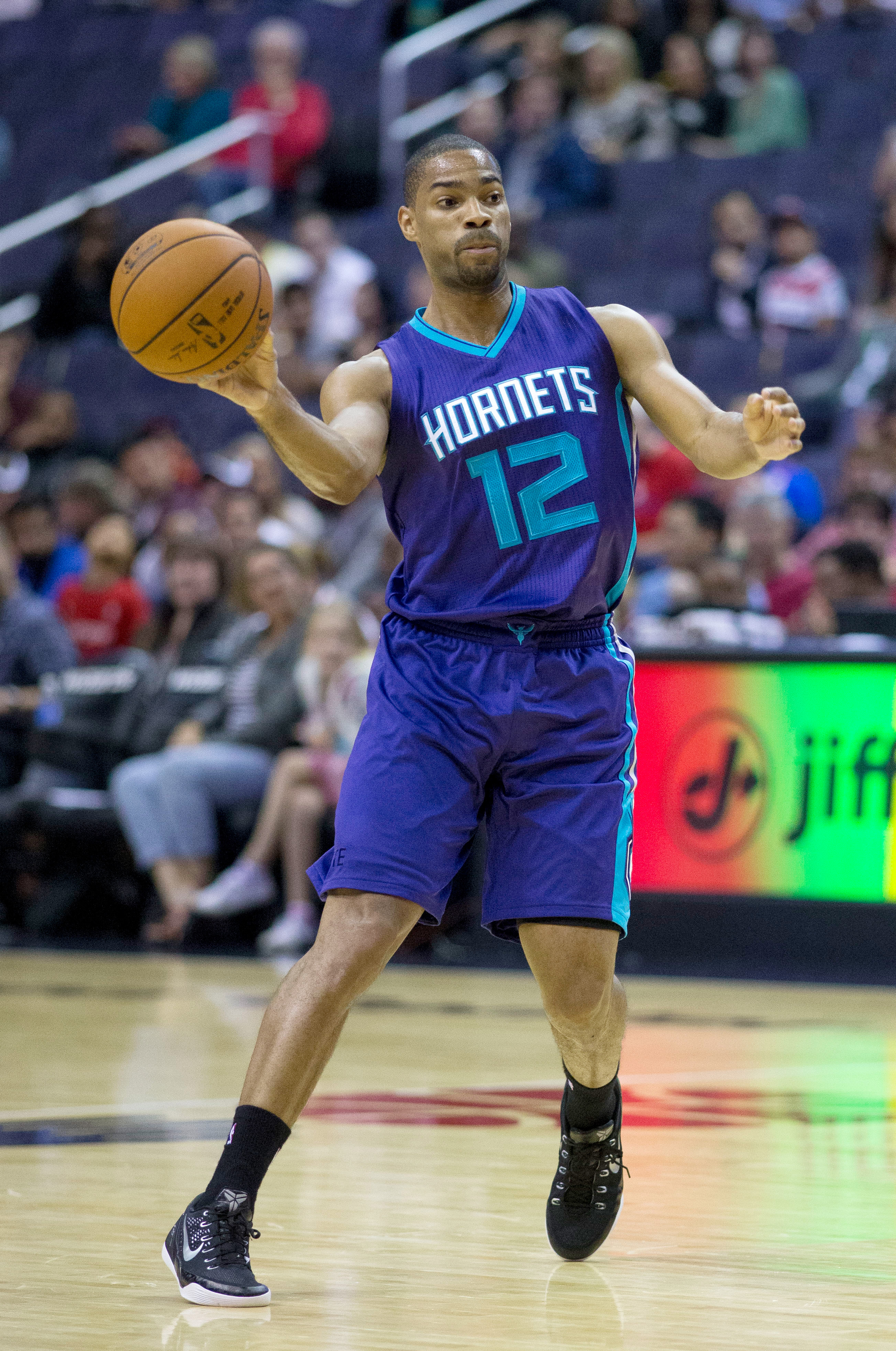
Gary Neal was the Turkish Super League's Top Scorer in 2008.

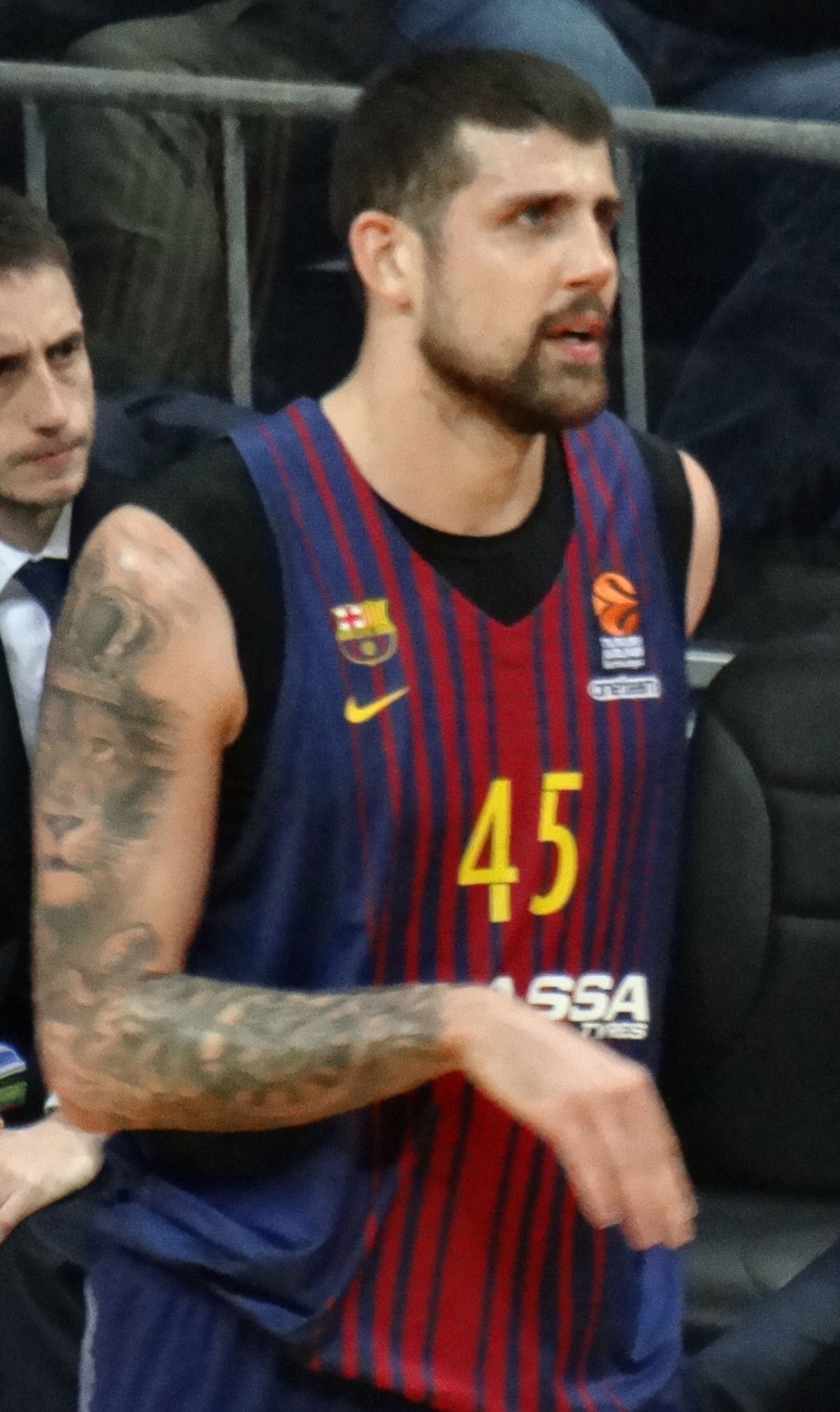
Adrien Moerman was the Turkish Super League's Top Scorer in 2016.

Player (X)	Number of times leading the league

Note: Flags indicate national team eligibility at FIBA-sanctioned events. Players may hold other non-FIBA nationalities not displayed.

Top Scorers By Points Per Game (1993–94 to present)
Season	Scoring leader	Team	PPG	Ref.
1993–94	(United States) Joel DeBortoli	Bakırköyspor	25.5	
1994–95	(United States) George Gilmore	Darüşşafaka	25.9	
1995–96	(United States) Lamont Strothers	Darüşşafaka	23.9	
1996–97	(United States) Lamont Strothers (2)	Darüşşafaka	23.5	
1997–98	(United States) Michael Ansley	Darüşşafaka	23.8	
1998–99	(Turkey) İbrahim Kutluay	Fenerbahçe	24.5	
1999–00	(Bosnia and Herzegovina) Damir Mršić	Troy Pilsner	22.8	
2000–01	(United States) Bud Eley	Beşiktaş	23.9	
2001–02	(Turkey) Bekir Yarangüme	TED Ankara Kolejliler	21.1	
2002–03	(United States) Dewayne Jefferson	Pınar Karşıyaka	23.4	
2003–04	(United States) Marc Salyers	Oyak Renault	25.3	
2004–05	(Turkey) Harun Erdenay (3)	İTÜ	21.4	
2005–06	(United States) Malik Dixon	Galatasaray	22.6	
2006–07	(United States) Gerald Fitch	Galatasaray	19.7	
2007–08	(United States) Gary Neal	Pınar Karşıyaka	23.6	
2008–09	(United States) Alex Gordon	Oyak Renault	20.9	
2009–10	(North Macedonia) Quincy Douby	Darüşşafaka	23.6	
2010–11	(Turkey) Ali Karadeniz	Trabzonspor	23.0	
2011–12	(United States) Jonathan Gibson	Trabzonspor	19.9	
2012–13	(Turkey) Ali Karadeniz (2)	Mersin BB	21.4	
2013–14	(North Macedonia) Darius Washington	Olin Edirne	23.5	
2014–15	(United States) Matt Walsh	Eskişehir Basket	18.4	
2015–16	(France) Adrien Moerman	Banvit	18.0	
2016–17	(United States) Ricky Ledo	Yeşilgiresun Belediye	21.1	
2017–18	(United States) Erving Walker	Demir İnşaat Büyükçekmece	18.5	
2018–19	(United States) Kenny Hayes	Arel Üniversitesi Büyükçekmece	21.7	
2019–20	Season was cancelled due to the coronavirus pandemic in Turkey.			
2020–21	(Mexico) Paco Cruz	HDI Sigorta Afyon Belediye	19.6	
2021–22	(United States) Jarmar Gulley	Gaziantep Basketbol	20.0	
2022–23	(United States) Jordon Crawford	ONVO Büyükçekmece	19.6	
2023–24	(United States) Marcquise Reed	ONVO Büyükçekmece	21.1	
2024–25	(United States) Marcquise Reed (2)	Tofaş	17.6	
2025–26	(United States) Marcquise Reed (3)	Trabzonspor	23.4	

== Players with most awards ==
Player	Awards	Editions
(Turkey) Erman Kunter	7	1976, 1979–1982, 1988, 1991
(Turkey) Harun Erdenay	3	1990, 1993, 2005
(United States) Marcquise Reed	3	2024, 2025, 2026
(United States) Lamont Strothers	2	1996, 1997
(Turkey) Hüseyin Alp	2	1967, 1974
(Turkey) Barış Küce	2	1971, 1972
(United States) Marcquise Reed	2	2024, 2025
(Turkey) Ali Karadeniz	2	2011, 2013
(United States) Paul Dawkins	2	1985, 1986

== See also ==
- BSL Most Valuable Player Award
- Basketbol Süper Ligi Finals MVP
