= Antalya Expo Center =

Indoor arena in Antalya, Turkey

- Interactive map of Antalya Expo Center
- Location: Antalya, Turkey
- Coordinates: 36.94049°N 30.81676°E
- Owner: Antalya Fair Management and Investment Inc. (ANFAŞ)
- Capacity: 3,800
- Events: Trade fair, indoor sports

Construction
- Opened: 1999

Website
- www.anfas.com.tr

Antalya Expo Center is an indoor arena in Antalya, Turkey. The Expo Center was founded in 1999 by Antalya Fair Management and Investment Inc. It has a seating capacity for 3,800 people for sports events. It is located 5 km (3.1 mi) north of the Antalya Airport and 11 km (6.8 mi) northeast of the Antalya city.

The arena hosted some games of the first stages of Eurobasket 2001 and the 2010 World Weightlifting Championships on September 17–26.
