= Kunter =

Kunter is a Turkish and German surname/name. In Old Turkic, "Kunt" means "strong" and it refers to the strength of the "large ropes used to tie the ships to the docks" and "Er" means "soldier" or "man". Thus "Kunter" is usually used as a male name meaning "strong man, strong soldier", and in Ottoman Turkish it means "kind man". Notable persons with the surname Kunter include:

- Erman Kunter (1956–), Turkish basketball player
- Peter Kunter (1941–2024), German footballer
- Roksan Kunter, daughter of the last Ottoman Emperor
