= Aski =

Aski may refer to:

- ASKI Sport Hall
- ASKI (German: Ausländer Sonderkonten für Inlandszahlungen) – special accounts for inland payments (Hjalmar Schacht)
