= Hüseyin Alp =

Turkish basketball player and actor (1935–1983)

Personal information
- Born: May 12, 1935 Kangal, Sivas Province, Turkey
- Died: January 8, 1983 (aged 47) Istanbul, Turkey
- Listed height: 2.15 m (7 ft 1 in)
- Listed weight: 260 lb (118 kg)

Career information
- Playing career: 1962–1974
- Position: Center
- Number: 15

Career history
- 1962–1966: İTÜ
- 1966–1967: Altınordu
- 1967–1968: İTÜ
- 1968–1969: Altınordu
- 1969–1974: İTÜ

Career highlights
- 6× Turkish League champion (1967, 1968, 1970–1973); Turkish Cup winner (1971); 2× Turkish League Top Scorer (1967, 1974)

Hüseyin Alp (May 12, 1935 – January 8, 1983) was a Turkish professional basketball player and supporting role movie actor. With his height of 2.15 m (7 ft 1 in) tall, he was one of the tallest Turkish basketball players.

== Early life ==
Alp was born 1935, in Kangal, Sivas Province.

== Club career ==
Alp started playing basketball at the age of 27. From 1962 to 1974, he played at the center position, for the İTÜ and Altınordu teams. During his club career, he won six Turkish Super League championships (1967, 1968, 1970, 1971, 1972, 1973). He was the Turkish Super League's Top Scorer, in 1967 and 1974.

== National team career ==
Alp was also a member of the senior Turkish national basketball team. With Turkey, he played in 73 games. He played at the 1971 EuroBasket.

== Acting career ==
In addition to his basketball career, Alp starred in some Turkish made movies, in supporting roles, from 1965 to 1978. He played in roles that featured his giant-like appearance.

=== Filmography ===
- Kadın Okşanmak İster (1965)
- Tarkan Gümüş Eyer (1970) - as Giant
- Erkek Gibi Ölenler (1970)
- Tarkan Viking Kanı (1971) - Orso
- Kara Murat Şeyh Gaffar'a Karşı (1976)
- Babanın Evlatları (1977) - as Mafiosi boss Beşir

== Death and legacy ==
Hüseyin Alp died on January 8, 1983, at the age of 48, in Istanbul. A junior women's basketball club, the "Kağıthane Hüseyin Alp S.K.", was formed in the Kağıthane district of Istanbul, in his honor.
