= Erman Kunter =

Turkish basketball player and coach (born 1956)

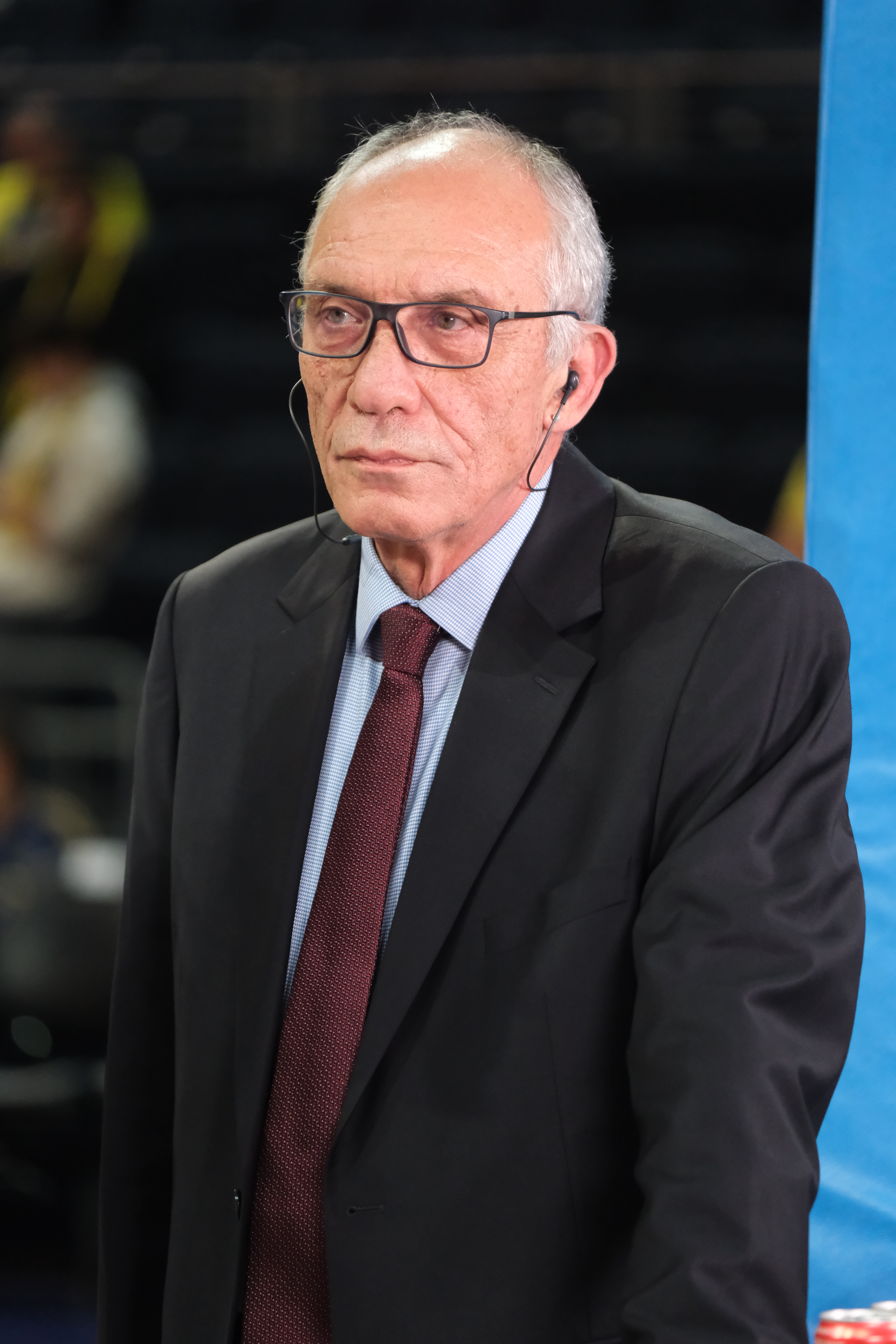

Personal information
- Born: 8 October 1956 (age 70) Istanbul, Turkey
- Listed height: 6 ft 2.75 in (1.90 m)
- Listed weight: 180 lb (82 kg)

Career information
- Playing career: 1975–1992
- Position: Shooting guard
- Number: 10
- Coaching career: 1994–present

Career history

Playing
- 1975–1976: İTÜ
- 1976–1977: Beşiktaş
- 1977–1978: Yenişehir Meysu
- 1978–1983: Beşiktaş
- 1983–1986: Eczacıbaşı
- 1986–1987: Beşiktaş
- 1987–1989: Fenerbahçe
- 1989–1991: Beşiktaş
- 1991–1992: Çukurova Sanayi

Coaching
- 1994–1996: Darüşşafaka
- 1996–1997: Beşiktaş
- 1997–2000: Turkey
- 2002–2003: Galatasaray
- 2003–2004: Cholet
- 2004–2005: ASVEL
- 2006–2012: Cholet
- 2012–2013: Beşiktaş
- 2014–2017: Le Mans
- 2017–2018: Galatasaray
- 2018–2021: Cholet
- 2022–2023: Tunisia

Career highlights
- As player: 7× Turkish League Top Scorer (1976, 1979–1982, 1988, 1991); As head coach: Turkish Supercup winner (2012); French League champion (2010); French League Cup winner (2008); French Cup winner (2016); French Supercup winner (2010); French League Best Coach (2010)

Erman Kunter (born 8 October 1956) is a Turkish former professional basketball player and coach. He most recently served as head coach of Galatasaray, of the Turkish Basketball Super League (BSL).

He is well known for being the player that scored the most points ever in a single-game of any top-tier level professional basketball league in the world, with 153 points scored in a Turkish Super League game in 1988.

== Professional playing career ==
During his pro club career, Kunter played with İTÜ, Beşiktaş, Eczacıbaşı, Yenişehir Meysu, Fenerbahçe, and Çukurova Sanayi.

As a Fenerbahçe player, he scored 153 points (81 points in the first half), of his team's 175 total points, in a Turkish League game against Hilalspor, on 12 March 1988. It is still a record in Turkey, and the highest single-game scoring record ever in any top-tier level professional league in the world. During the game, he made 17 three-pointers.

== National team career ==
Kunter played in 213 games with the senior Turkish national team, and scored a total of 3,699 points (17.4 points per game). With Turkey, he played at EuroBasket 1981.

== Coaching career ==
Kunter was the head coach of Darüşşafaka, Beşiktaş, the senior Turkish national team, and Galatasaray in Turkey; and Cholet Basket, Asvel Villeurbanne, and Le Mans in France. In 2010, he led Cholet Basket to win the French League championship. In June 2012, he signed with Beşiktaş, to be their new head coach.

After that, he returned to France, to be the head coach of Le Mans, in 2014. He became the head coach of Galatasaray in 2017. He was also hired to be the head coach of the senior Iraqi national basketball team, in 2017. In September 2022, he was hired as a head coach for Tunisia national basketball team. In July 2023 he was replaced by Mario Palma.

== Personal life ==
Kunter is married to Sofia Ayten Kunter Hanımefendi, the daughter of Osman Nami Osmanoğlu, and great-granddaughter of Ottoman sultan Abdul Hamid II. They have one daughter, named Roksan. She acquired French citizenship in September 2010, and since then, he retains two dual citizenship (French and Turkish).

== See also ==
- List of basketball players who have scored 100 points in a single game
- Kunter
