= Dewayne Jefferson =

American basketball player (born 1979)

Personal information
- Born: August 10, 1979 (age 47)
- Listed height: 6 ft 3 in (1.91 m)
- Listed weight: 184 lb (83 kg)

Career information
- High school: West Point (West Point, Mississippi)
- College: East Mississippi CC (1997–1999); Mississippi Valley State (1999–2001)
- NBA draft: 2001: undrafted
- Playing career: 2002–2010
- Position: Shooting guard

Career history
- 2002–2003: Pınar Karşıyaka
- 2003–2004: Dynamo Moscow
- 2004: Roseto Sharks
- 2004–2005: Robur Basket Osimo
- 2005–2006: Erdemirspor
- 2006–2007: Makedonikos
- 2007: Andrea Costa Imola
- 2007–2008: Olympias Patras
- 2008: Bosna
- 2008–2009: Élan Chalon
- 2010: Étendard de Brest

Career highlights
- Turkish League Top Scorer (2003); SWAC Player of the Year (2001)

Dewayne Jefferson (born August 10, 1979) is an American former professional basketball player who grew up in West Point, Mississippi.

== College career ==
Jefferson rose to prominence while playing college basketball at Mississippi Valley State University from 1999 to 2001, where he was NCAA Division I's second leading scorer with 23.6 points per game in his senior season.

== Professional career ==
After college, he played professionally in Europe. He last played with Étendard de Brest in France.

== Awards and achievements ==
- West Point High School Slam Dunk (Not Brandon Walker)

Champion (1997)

- Turkish League Top Scorer (2003)

== See also ==
- List of NCAA Division I men's basketball season 3-point field goal leaders
