= EuroBasket 2001 =

International basketball event

2001 Avrupa Basketbol Şampiyonası

Tournament details
- Host country: Turkey
- Dates: 31 August – 9 September
- Teams: 16
- Venues: 3 (in 3 host cities)

Final positions
- Champions: Yugoslavia (3rd title)
- Runners-up: Turkey
- Third place: Spain
- Fourth place: Germany

Tournament statistics
- Games played: 40
- MVP: (Federal Republic of Yugoslavia) Peja Stojaković
- Top scorer: (Germany) Dirk Nowitzki (28.7 ppg)
- Top rebounds: (Spain) Gasol (9.7 rpg)
- Top assists: (Latvia) Miglinieks (7.3 apg)

Official website
- EuroBasket 2001 (archive)

The 2001 FIBA European Championship, commonly called FIBA EuroBasket 2001, was the 32nd FIBA EuroBasket regional basketball championship held by FIBA Europe, which also served as Europe qualifier for the 2002 FIBA World Championship, giving a berth to the top four (or five, depending on Yugoslavia reaching one of the top four places) teams in the final standings. It was held in Turkey between 31 August and 9 September 2001. Sixteen national teams entered the event under the auspices of FIBA Europe, the sport's regional governing body. The cities of Ankara, Antalya and Istanbul hosted the tournament. Yugoslavia won its eighth FIBA European title (and last while competing under the name Yugoslavia) by defeating hosts Turkey with a 78–69 score in the final. Vlado Šćepanović scored 19 points for Yugoslavia, while İbrahim Kutluay scored 19 for Turkey. Yugoslavia's Peja Stojaković was voted the tournament's MVP.

== Venues ==
Location	Picture	City	Arena	Capacity	Status	Round
EuroBasket 2001 is located in Turkey		Ankara	ASKI Sport Hall	6,000		Groups A and B Second round
EuroBasket 2001 is located in Turkey		Antalya	Antalya Expo Center	3,800	Opened in 1999	Groups C and D
EuroBasket 2001 is located in Turkey		Istanbul	Abdi İpekçi Arena	12,270	Opened in 1986	Knockout stages

== Qualification ==
Of the sixteen teams that participated in EuroBasket 2001, the top eight teams from the previous tournament qualified directly. The other eight teams earned their berths via a qualifying tournament.

Competition	Date	Vacancies	Qualified
Host nation	–	1	Turkey
Qualified through EuroBasket 1999	29 August – 8 September 1999	7	France; Germany; Italy; Lithuania; Russia; Spain; Yugoslavia
Qualified through Qualifying Round	18 May 1998 – 27 January 2001	8	Bosnia and Herzegovina; Croatia; Estonia; Greece; Israel; Latvia; Slovenia; Ukraine

Group A	Group B	Group C	Group D
France; Israel; Lithuania; Ukraine	Latvia; Slovenia; Spain; Turkey	Croatia; Estonia; Germany; Yugoslavia	Bosnia and Herzegovina; Greece; Italy; Russia

== Format ==
- The teams were split in four groups of four teams each where they played a round robin. The first team from each group qualified directly to the knockout stage. To define the other four teams that advanced to the knockout stage, second and third-placed teams from each group where cross-paired (2A vs. 3B, 3A vs. 2B, 2C vs. 3D, 3C vs. 2D) and the winner from each match advanced to the knockout stage.
- In the knockout quarterfinals, the winners advanced to the semifinals. The winners from the semifinals competed for the championship in the final, while the losing teams play a consolation game for the third place.
- The losing teams from the quarterfinals play in a separate bracket to define 5th through 8th place in the final standings.

== Squads ==
At the start of tournament, all 16 participating countries had 12 players on their roster.

== Preliminary round ==
Qualified for the quarterfinals
Qualified for the second round

Times given below are in Eastern European Summer Time (UTC+3).

=== Group A ===
Team	Pld	W	L	PF	PA	PD	Pts	Tie
France	3	2	1	239	225	+14	5	1–0
Lithuania	3	2	1	215	195	+20	5	0–1
Israel	3	1	2	218	210	+8	4	1–0
Ukraine	3	1	2	214	256	−42	4	0–1

31 August
14:30

Boxscore

Ukraine	60–82	Lithuania
Scoring by quarter: 18–21, 13–14, 8–18, 21–29
Pts: 3 Players 13; Rebs: Okunskyy 15; Asts: Ievstratenko, Khryapa 3		Pts: Šiškauskas 16; Rebs: Einikis 7 Asts: Jasikevičius 6

ASKI Sport Hall, Ankara
Attendance: 2,000
Referees: Philippe Leemann (SUI), Aleksander Gorshkov (RUS)

31 August
16:45

Boxscore

Israel	71–77 (OT)	France
Scoring by quarter: 12–18, 16–16, 16–15, 18–13, Overtime: 9–15
Pts: Tapiro 21; Rebs: Tapiro 12; Asts: Tapiro 7		Pts: Foirest 18; Rebs: Sciarra 10; Asts: Foirest 5

ASKI Sport Hall, Ankara
Attendance: 5,800
Referees: Carl Jungebrand (FIN), Danko Radić (CRO)

1 September
14:30

Boxscore

France	86–89	Ukraine
Scoring by quarter: 15–15, 26–19, 15–30, 30–25
Pts: Palmer 18; Rebs: Palmer 10; Asts: Sciarra 1		Pts: Okunskyy 28; Rebs: Korablov, Okunskyy 6 Asts: Korablov, Rayevskyy 3

ASKI Sport Hall, Ankara
Attendance: 2,000
Referees: Efim Resser (GER), Ademir Zurapović (BIH)

1 September
16:45

Boxscore

Lithuania	68–59	Israel
Scoring by quarter: 18–4, 9–22, 23–21, 18–12
Pts: Timinskas 15; Rebs: Timinskas 7 Asts: Jasikevičius 4		Pts: Sharp, Turgeman 12; Rebs: Green 11; Asts: Lubin 3

ASKI Sport Hall, Ankara
Attendance: 5,800
Referees: Gennaro Colucci (ITA), Ilija Belošević (YUG)

2 September
14:30

Boxscore

Ukraine	65–88	Israel
Scoring by quarter: 20–21, 13–22, 17–23, 15–22
Pts: Ryzhov 16; Rebs: Okunskyy 6 Asts: Rayevskyy 2		Pts: Saffar 19; Rebs: Green 9 Asts: Tapiro 5

ASKI Sport Hall, Ankara
Attendance: 5,800
Referees: Dubravko Muhvić (CRO), Atso Matsalu (EST)

2 September
21:45

Boxscore

France	76–65	Lithuania
Scoring by quarter: 27–20, 20–10, 14–17, 15–18
Pts: Risacher 18; Rebs: Sciarra 8 Asts: Sciarra 7		Pts: Šiškauskas 13; Rebs: Timinskas, Žukauskas 5 Asts: Jasikevičius 3

ASKI Sport Hall, Ankara
Attendance: 5,800
Referees: Nikolaos Pitsilkas (GRE), Carl Jungebrand (FIN)

=== Group B ===
Team	Pld	W	L	PF	PA	PD	Pts	Tie
Turkey	3	2	1	226	232	−6	5	1–0
Spain	3	2	1	270	222	+48	5	0–1
Latvia	3	1	2	258	284	−26	4	1–0
Slovenia	3	1	2	225	241	−16	4	0–1

31 August
19:00

Boxscore

Latvia	82–85	Turkey
Scoring by quarter: 14–17, 28–20, 22–30, 18–18
Pts: Bagatskis 21; Rebs: Kambala 11; Asts: Miglinieks 7		Pts: Kutluay 20; Rebs: Türkcan 9 Asts: Türkcan 5

ASKI Sport Hall, Ankara
Attendance: 6,000
Referees: Gennaro Colucci (ITA), Ilija Belošević (YUG)

31 August
21:15

Boxscore

Slovenia	61–85	Spain
Scoring by quarter: 15–25, 14–21, 18–25, 14–14
Pts: Udrih 12; Rebs: Nesterovič, Udrih 4 Asts: McDonald 4		Pts: Paraíso 17; Rebs: Gasol 9 Asts: Angulo 4

ASKI Sport Hall, Ankara
Attendance: 5,800
Referees: Nikolaos Pitsilkas (GRE), Efim Resser (GER)

1 September
19:00

Boxscore

Turkey	57–71	Slovenia
Scoring by quarter: 18–15, 13–13, 13–19, 13–24
Pts: Kutluay 19; Rebs: Beşok 12; Asts: Türkoğlu 3		Pts: Nesterovič 20; Rebs: Nesterovič 11; Asts: Bečirovič, Milič 4

ASKI Sport Hall, Ankara
Attendance: 6,000
Referees: Carl Jungebrand (FIN), Danko Radić (CRO)

1 September
21:15

Boxscore

Spain	106–77	Latvia
Scoring by quarter: 23–21, 27–21, 30–15, 26–20
Pts: Paraíso 16; Rebs: Gasol 9 Asts: Navarro 9		Pts: Helmanis 20; Rebs: Bagatskis, Kambala 6 Asts: Miglinieks 7

ASKI Sport Hall, Ankara
Attendance: 5,800
Referees: Aleksander Gorshkov (RUS), Atso Matsalu (EST)

2 September
16:45

Boxscore

Latvia	99–93 (OT)	Slovenia
Scoring by quarter: 26–29, 22–14, 17–25, 22–15, Overtime: 16–10
Pts: Kambala 24; Rebs: Bagatskis, Kambala 9 Asts: Miglinieks 12		Pts: 3 Players 19; Rebs: Nesterovič 12; Asts: Bečirovič 6

ASKI Sport Hall, Ankara
Attendance: 5,800
Referees: Philippe Leemann (SUI), Ademir Zurapović (BIH)

2 September
19:00

Boxscore

Spain	79–84	Turkey
Scoring by quarter: 14–26, 28–22, 13–22, 24–14
Pts: Navarro 24; Rebs: Gasol 10; Asts: López 4		Pts: Kutluay 35; Rebs: Beşok 10; Asts: Ene 3

ASKI Sport Hall, Ankara
Attendance: 6,000
Referees: Efim Resser (GER), Gennaro Colucci (ITA)

=== Group C ===
Team	Pld	W	L	PF	PA	PD	Pts
Yugoslavia	3	3	0	279	197	+82	6
Germany	3	2	1	263	245	+18	5
Croatia	3	1	2	235	247	−12	4
Estonia	3	0	3	198	286	−88	3

31 August
16:45

Boxscore

Estonia	71–92	Germany
Scoring by quarter: 18–19, 22–26, 14–25, 17–22
Pts: Müürsepp 15; Rebs: Müürsepp, Noormets 5 Asts: Pärn, Tein 3		Pts: Nowitzki 33; Rebs: Nowitzki 12; Asts: Demirel 3

Antalya Expo Center, Antalya
Referees: Eduardo Sancha (ESP), Moise Bitton (ISR)

31 August
19:00

Boxscore

Croatia	66–80	Yugoslavia
Scoring by quarter: 20–26, 15–17, 20–18, 11–19
Pts: Kovačić 19; Rebs: Kovačić 8 Asts: Mulaomerović 5		Pts: Stojaković 21; Rebs: Tarlać 9 Asts: Jarić 4

Antalya Expo Center, Antalya
Referees: Romualdas Brazauskas (LTU), Petr Sudek (SVK)

1 September
14:30

Boxscore

Yugoslavia	113–58	Estonia
Scoring by quarter: 33–18, 21–15, 34–10, 25–15
Pts: Stojaković 21; Rebs: Tarlać 9 Asts: Obradović 5		Pts: Müürsepp 16; Rebs: Metstak 9 Asts: 3 Players 3

Antalya Expo Center, Antalya
Referees: Kamen Toshev (BUL), Borys Shulga (UKR)

1 September
16:45

Boxscore

Germany	98–88	Croatia
Scoring by quarter: 25–19, 23–25, 24–17, 26–27
Pts: Nowitzki 31; Rebs: Femerling, Okulaja 4 Asts: Demirel, Pesic 3		Pts: Mulaomerović 23; Rebs: Kovačić 10; Asts: 3 Players 3

Antalya Expo Center, Antalya
Attendance: 1,100
Referees: Pascal Dorizon (FRA), Murat Biricik (TUR)

2 September
14:30

Boxscore

Estonia	69–81	Croatia
Scoring by quarter: 10–21, 23–22, 14–17, 22–21
Pts: Müürsepp 24; Rebs: Müürsepp 8 Asts: Pehka 4		Pts: Giriček 21; Rebs: Giriček 8 Asts: Giriček, Mulaomerović 3

Antalya Expo Center, Antalya
Attendance: 1,800
Referees: Eduardo Sancha (ESP), Moise Bitton (ISR)

2 September
19:00

Boxscore

Yugoslavia	86–73	Germany
Scoring by quarter: 22–13, 19–13, 17–28, 28–19
Pts: Stojaković 22; Rebs: Drobnjak 6 Asts: Jarić 4		Pts: Okulaja 18; Rebs: Okulaja 8 Asts: Okulaja 4

Antalya Expo Center, Antalya
Attendance: 2,200
Referees: Romualdas Brazauskas (LTU), Petr Sudek (SVK)

=== Group D ===
Team	Pld	W	L	PF	PA	PD	Pts	Tie
Russia	3	2	1	247	208	+39	5	0.543
Italy	3	2	1	242	207	+35	5	0.539
Greece	3	2	1	265	265	0	5	0.500
Bosnia and Herzegovina	3	0	3	206	280	−74	3	

31 August
14:30

Boxscore

Bosnia and Herzegovina	63–83	Russia
Scoring by quarter: 17–25, 19–25, 14–18, 13–15
Pts: Marković 12; Rebs: Mujezinović, Ovčina 6 Asts: 3 Players 3		Pts: Kirilenko 26; Rebs: Bachminov 9 Asts: E. Pashutin 6

Antalya Expo Center, Antalya
Referees: Kamen Toshev (BUL), Murat Biricik (TUR)

31 August
21:15

Boxscore

Greece	83–82	Italy
Scoring by quarter: 24–25, 18–17, 23–20, 18–20
Pts: Rentzias 22; Rebs: Kakiouzis 4 Asts: Sigalas 8		Pts: Fučka 21; Rebs: Fučka 5 Asts: Meneghin 7

Antalya Expo Center, Antalya
Referees: Iztok Rems (SLO), Pascal Dorizon (FRA)

1 September
19:00

Boxscore

Italy	96–66	Bosnia and Herzegovina
Scoring by quarter: 35–12, 18–24, 26–13, 17–17
Pts: Chiacig 15; Rebs: Fučka 7 Asts: Basile 6		Pts: Mujezinović 17; Rebs: Mujezinović 6 Asts: Firić, Mršić 3

Antalya Expo Center, Antalya
Referees: Romualdas Brazauskas (LTU), Juris Kokainis (LAT)

1 September
21:15

Boxscore

Russia	106–81	Greece
Scoring by quarter: 37–26, 19–15, 27–23, 23–17
Pts: Chikalkin 27; Rebs: Panov 11; Asts: Panov 7		Pts: Alvertis 20; Rebs: Fotsis 5 Asts: Papaloukas 5

Antalya Expo Center, Antalya
Attendance: 2,500
Referees: Eduardo Sancha (ESP), Petr Sudek (SVK)

2 September
16:45

Boxscore

Italy	64–58	Russia
Scoring by quarter: 15–13, 16–11, 21–18, 12–16
Pts: Fučka 18; Rebs: Fučka 10; Asts: Meneghin 6		Pts: Kirilenko 16; Rebs: Kirilenko 10; Asts: E. Pashutin 6

Antalya Expo Center, Antalya
Attendance: 2,000
Referees: Iztok Rems (SLO), Murat Biricik (TUR)

2 September
21:15

Boxscore

Bosnia and Herzegovina	77–101	Greece
Scoring by quarter: 21–21, 23–18, 10–29, 23–33
Pts: Mršić 21; Rebs: Lerić, Mujezinović 6 Asts: Mršić 4		Pts: Alvertis 23; Rebs: Fotsis 7 Asts: Papaloukas 7

Antalya Expo Center, Antalya
Attendance: 1,500
Referees: Pascal Dorizon (FRA), Borys Shulga (UKR)

== Knockout stage ==
=== Championship bracket ===
Play-off; 3 September 2001
Germany	80
Greece	75
Italy	57
Croatia	65
Lithuania	76
Latvia	94
Spain	71
Israel	67

Quarterfinals; 5–6 September 2001
France	77
Germany	81
Turkey (OT)	87
Croatia	85
Yugoslavia	114
Latvia	78
Russia	55
Spain	62

Semifinals; 8 September 2001
Germany	78
Turkey (OT)	79
Yugoslavia	78
Spain	65

Final; 9 September 2001
Turkey	69
Yugoslavia	78
Third place
Germany	90
Spain	99

==== Play-off ====
3 September
19:00

Boxscore

Lithuania	76–94	Latvia
Scoring by quarter: 20–20, 15–25, 17–21, 24–28
Pts: Timinskas 15; Rebs: Timinskas 8 Asts: Jasikevičius 6		Pts: Bagatskis 25; Rebs: Kambala 11; Asts: Miglinieks, Štelmahers 5

ASKI Sport Hall, Ankara
Attendance: 1,500
Referees: Efim Resser (GER), Ilija Belošević (YUG)

3 September
21:15

Boxscore

Spain	71–67	Israel
Scoring by quarter: 10–11, 27–19, 16–24, 18–13
Pts: Reyes 16; Rebs: Reyes 11; Asts: Navarro 5		Pts: Turgeman 15; Rebs: Green 7 Asts: Turgeman 2

ASKI Sport Hall, Ankara
Attendance: 1,500
Referees: Nikolaos Pitsilkas (GRE), Philippe Leemann (SUI)

3 September
19:00

Boxscore

Italy	57–65	Croatia
Scoring by quarter: 15–14, 11–16, 18–18, 13–17
Pts: Pecile 15; Rebs: Chiacig 9 Asts: Righetti 3		Pts: Mršić 14; Rebs: Tabak 12; Asts: Mulaomerović 3

Antalya Expo Center, Antalya
Attendance: 1,550
Referees: Romualdas Brazauskas (LTU), Pascal Dorizon (FRA)

3 September
21:15

Boxscore

Germany	80–75	Greece
Scoring by quarter: 10–29, 21–18, 22–11, 27–17
Pts: Nowitzki 25; Rebs: Nowitzki 15; Asts: Garris 4		Pts: Sigalas 23; Rebs: Dikoudis 7 Asts: Papaloukas 7

Antalya Expo Center, Antalya
Attendance: 2,300
Referees: Iztok Rems (SLO), Eduardo Sancha (ESP)

==== Quarterfinals ====
5 September
19:00

Boxscore

Turkey	87–85 (OT)	Croatia
Scoring by quarter: 10–19, 18–25, 20–13, 25–16, Overtime: 14–12
Pts: Türkcan 20; Rebs: Türkcan 14; Asts: Erdenay, Türkoğlu 4		Pts: Giriček 28; Rebs: Vujčić 8 Asts: Mulaomerović 6

Abdi İpekçi Arena, Istanbul
Attendance: 12,000
Referees: Pascal Dorizon (FRA), Carl Jungebrand (FIN)

5 September
21:15

Boxscore

France	77–81	Germany
Scoring by quarter: 17–12, 24–23, 8–25, 28–21
Pts: Foirest 23; Rebs: Bilba, Sciarra 7 Asts: Sciarra 7		Pts: Nowitzki 32; Rebs: Okulaja 8 Asts: Garrett 2

Abdi İpekçi Arena, Istanbul
Attendance: 5,800
Referees: Iztok Rems (SLO), Philippe Leemann (SUI)

6 September
19:00

Boxscore

Yugoslavia	114–78	Latvia
Scoring by quarter: 37–13, 29–27, 25–21, 23–17
Pts: Stojaković 29; Rebs: Tomašević 8 Asts: Drobnjak, Jarić 6		Pts: Ļaksa 18; Rebs: Kambala 7 Asts: Štelmahers 7

Abdi İpekçi Arena, Istanbul
Attendance: 7,000
Referees: Eduardo Sancha (ESP), Murat Biricik (TUR)

6 September
21:15

Boxscore

Russia	55–62	Spain
Scoring by quarter: 13–7, 15–16, 15–20, 12–19
Pts: Chikalkin 12; Rebs: Panov 6 Asts: E. Pashutin 3		Pts: A. Reyes 13; Rebs: Gasol, Kornegay 9 Asts: Rodríguez 3

Abdi İpekçi Arena, Istanbul
Attendance: 7,000
Referees: Nikolaos Pitsilkas (GRE), Ilija Belošević (YUG)

==== Semifinals ====
8 September
19:00

Boxscore

Germany	78–79 (OT)	Turkey
Scoring by quarter: 20–19, 21–22, 15–16, 14–13, Overtime: 8–9
Pts: Nowitzki 22; Rebs: Okulaja 17; Asts: 5 Players 2		Pts: Kutluay 24; Rebs: Beşok 13; Asts: Türkoğlu 8

Abdi İpekçi Arena, Istanbul
Attendance: 12,000
Referees: Iztok Rems (SLO), Eduardo Sancha (ESP)

8 September
21:15

Boxscore

Yugoslavia	78–65	Spain
Scoring by quarter: 18–21, 18–18, 21–12, 21–14
Pts: Stojaković 30; Rebs: 3 Players 5 Asts: Jarić 4		Pts: Gasol 22; Rebs: Gasol 11; Asts: Angulo, López 2

Abdi İpekçi Arena, Istanbul
Attendance: 7,000
Referees: Pascal Dorizon (FRA), Murat Biricik (TUR)

==== Third place ====
9 September
19:00

Boxscore

Germany	90–99	Spain
Scoring by quarter: 22–24, 20–35, 21–17, 27–23
Pts: Nowitzki 43; Rebs: Nowitzki 15; Asts: Nowitzki 3		Pts: Gasol 31; Rebs: Gasol 10; Asts: Navarro 5

Abdi İpekçi Arena, Istanbul
Attendance: 9,000
Referees: Nikolaos Pitsilkas (GRE), Petr Sudek (SVK)

==== Final ====
9 September
21:15

Boxscore

Turkey	69–78	Yugoslavia
Scoring by quarter: 22–15, 18–23, 17–20, 12–20
Pts: Kutluay 16; Rebs: Beşok 9 Asts: Türkoğlu 3		Pts: Šćepanović 19; Rebs: Bodiroga, Tomašević 7 Asts: Tomašević 3

Abdi İpekçi Arena, Istanbul
Attendance: 12,000
Referees: Eduardo Sancha (ESP), Carl Jungebrand (FIN)

=== 5th to 8th place ===
Classification round
7 September – 19:00
France	90
Croatia	79
7 September – 21:15
Latvia	81
Russia	99

Fifth place
9 September – 16:45
France	73
Russia	78
Seventh place
9 September – 14:30
Croatia	93
Latvia	91

7 September
19:00

Boxscore

France	90–79	Croatia
Scoring by quarter: 21–23, 22–23, 28–15, 19–18
Pts: Parker 19; Rebs: Evtimov 8 Asts: Parker 4		Pts: Mulaomerović 16; Rebs: Mamić 7 Asts: Mulaomerović, Prkačin 4

Abdi İpekçi Arena, Istanbul
Attendance: 7,000
Referees: Nikolaos Pitsilkas (GRE), Petr Sudek (SVK)

7 September
21:15

Boxscore

Latvia	81–99	Russia
Scoring by quarter: 18–31, 21–32, 20–17, 22–19
Pts: Kambala 16; Rebs: Cipruss 9 Asts: Miglinieks, Štelmahers 6		Pts: Kirilenko 21; Rebs: Kirilenko 13; Asts: E. Pashutin 6

Abdi İpekçi Arena, Istanbul
Attendance: 2,000
Referees: Philippe Leemann (SUI), Dubravko Muhvić (CRO)

9 September
14:30

Boxscore

Croatia	93–91	Latvia
Scoring by quarter: 15–24, 24–22, 32–21, 22–24
Pts: 3 Players 17; Rebs: Tabak 10; Asts: Giriček, Mršić 3		Pts: Kambala 32; Rebs: Kambala 12; Asts: Miglinieks 11

Abdi İpekçi Arena, Istanbul
Attendance: 2,000
Referees: Murat Biricik (TUR), Philippe Leemann (SUI)

9 September
16:45

Boxscore

France	73–78	Russia
Scoring by quarter: 19–25, 17–15, 18–14, 19–24
Pts: Parker 17; Rebs: Bilba 7 Asts: Sciarra 4		Pts: Kirilenko 22; Rebs: Kirilenko 11; Asts: Panov 5

Abdi İpekçi Arena, Istanbul
Attendance: 7,000
Referees: Iztok Rems (SLO), Ilija Belošević (SRB)

== Statistical leaders ==
=== Individual Tournament Highs ===
Points

Pos.	Name	PPG
1	(Germany) Dirk Nowitzki	28.7
2	(Federal Republic of Yugoslavia) Peja Stojaković	23.0
3	(Turkey) İbrahim Kutluay	21.7
4	(Russia) Andrei Kirilenko	19.2
5	(Latvia) Kaspars Kambala	19.0
6	(Spain) Pau Gasol	17.3
7	(Latvia) Ainars Bagatskis	17.2
8	(Russia) Sergei Chikalkin	17.0
9	(Croatia) Damir Mulaomerović	16.7
10	(Greece) Fragiskos Alvertis	16.0

Rebounds

Pos.	Name	RPG
1	(Spain) Pau Gasol	9.7
2	(Turkey) Hüseyin Beşok	9.2
3	(Germany) Dirk Nowitzki	9.1
4	(Latvia) Kaspars Kambala	9.0
5	(Russia) Andrei Kirilenko	8.7
6	(Turkey) Mirsad Türkcan	8.3
7	(Germany) Ademola Okulaja	8.1
8	(Croatia) Emilio Kovačić	7.7
9	(Italy) Gregor Fučka	7.0
9	(Israel) Yaniv Green	7.0

Assists

Pos.	Name	APG
1	(Latvia) Raimonds Miglinieks	7.3
2	(France) Laurent Sciarra	5.3
3	(Greece) Theo Papaloukas	5.0
4	(Lithuania) Šarūnas Jasikevičius	4.8
4	(Italy) Andrea Meneghin	4.8
6	(Russia) Evgeniy Pashutin	4.5
7	(Latvia) Roberts Štelmahers	3.9
8	(Federal Republic of Yugoslavia) Marko Jarić	3.8
8	(Russia) Sergei Panov	3.8
10	(Croatia) Damir Mulaomerović	3.7

Steals

Pos.	Name	SPG
1	(Lithuania) Ramūnas Šiškauskas	3.5
2	(Federal Republic of Yugoslavia) Marko Jarić	2.8
2	(Russia) Andrei Kirilenko	2.8
4	(Russia) Sergei Panov	2.7
5	(Italy) Gianluca Basile	2.3
6	(Turkey) İbrahim Kutluay	2.2
7	(Russia) Evgeniy Pashutin	2.0
8	(Lithuania) Šarūnas Jasikevičius	1.8
8	(Italy) Andrea Meneghin	1.8
8	(Greece) Theo Papaloukas	1.8
8	(Israel) Yoav Saffar	1.8

Blocks

Pos.	Name	SPG
1	(Russia) Andrei Kirilenko	2.8
2	(Turkey) Mehmet Okur	2.2
3	(Spain) Pau Gasol	2.1
4	(Turkey) Mirsad Türkcan	1.2
5	(Germany) Dirk Nowitzki	1.0
5	(Greece) Giannis Giannoulis	1.0
5	(Lithuania) Ramūnas Šiškauskas	1.0
8	(Greece) Efthimios Rentzias	0.8
9	(Russia) Alexandre Bachminov	0.7
9	(Turkey) Hüseyin Beşok	0.7
9	(Federal Republic of Yugoslavia) Peja Drobnjak	0.7
9	(Federal Republic of Yugoslavia) Dragan Tarlać	0.7

Minutes

Pos.	Name	MPG
1	(Turkey) İbrahim Kutluay	37.3
2	(Turkey) Hedo Türkoğlu	36.0
3	(Israel) Derrick Sharp	34.3
4	(Israel) Shalom Turgeman	33.9
5	(Germany) Dirk Nowitzki	33.3
6	(Germany) Ademola Okulaja	33.7
7	(Croatia) Damir Mulaomerović	32.9
8	(Russia) Andrei Kirilenko	32.8
9	(Greece) Fragiskos Alvertis	32.5
9	(Lithuania) Ramūnas Šiškauskas	32.5

=== Individual Game Highs ===
Department	Name	Total	Opponent
Points	(Germany) Dirk Nowitzki	43	Spain
Rebounds	(Germany) Ademola Okulaja	17	Turkey
Assists	(Latvia) Raimonds Miglinieks	12	Slovenia
Steals	(Israel) Lior Lubin	8	Ukraine
Blocks	(Spain) Pau Gasol (Russia) Andrei Kirilenko	5	Turkey; Italy
Turnovers	(Lithuania) Šarūnas Jasikevičius	8	Israel

=== Team Tournament Highs ===
Offensive PPG

Pos.	Name	PPG
1	Yugoslavia	91.5
2	Latvia	86.0
3	Germany	85.0
4	Germany	84.6
5	Spain	81.0

Rebounds

Pos.	Name	RPG
1	Croatia	36.3
2	Slovenia	36.0
3	Germany	34.4
4	Russia	33.7
4	Turkey	33.7

Assists

Pos.	Name	APG
1	Yugoslavia	17.2
2	Latvia	16.7
3	Russia	16.3
4	Greece	14.5
4	Italy	14.5

Steals

Pos.	Name	SPG
1	Israel	12.3
2	Yugoslavia	12.0
3	Russia	11.0
4	Italy	10.5
5	Lithuania	9.8

Blocks

Pos.	Name	SPG
1	Russia	4.7
2	Turkey	3.8
3	Spain	2.7
4	Greece	2.5
5	Lithuania	2.2

=== Team Game highs ===
Department	Name	Total	Opponent
Points	Yugoslavia	114	Latvia
Rebounds	Germany	49	Turkey
Assists	Yugoslavia	33	Estonia
Steals	Yugoslavia	18	Latvia
Blocks	Russia	9	Italy
Field goal percentage	Yugoslavia	67.2% (41/61)	Estonia
3-point field goal percentage	Latvia	63.6% (14/22)	Lithuania
Free throw percentage	Latvia; Croatia	100% (22/22); 100% (19/19)	Croatia; Latvia
Turnovers	Czech Republic	23	Italy

== Awards ==
2001 FIBA EuroBasket champions

Yugoslavia
3rd title

2001 FIBA EuroBasket MVP: Peja Stojaković ( (Federal Republic of Yugoslavia) Yugoslavia)

All-Tournament Team
(Croatia) Damir Mulaomerović
(Federal Republic of Yugoslavia) Peja Stojaković (MVP)
(Turkey) Ibrahim Kutluay
(Germany) Dirk Nowitzki
(Spain) Pau Gasol

== Final standings ==
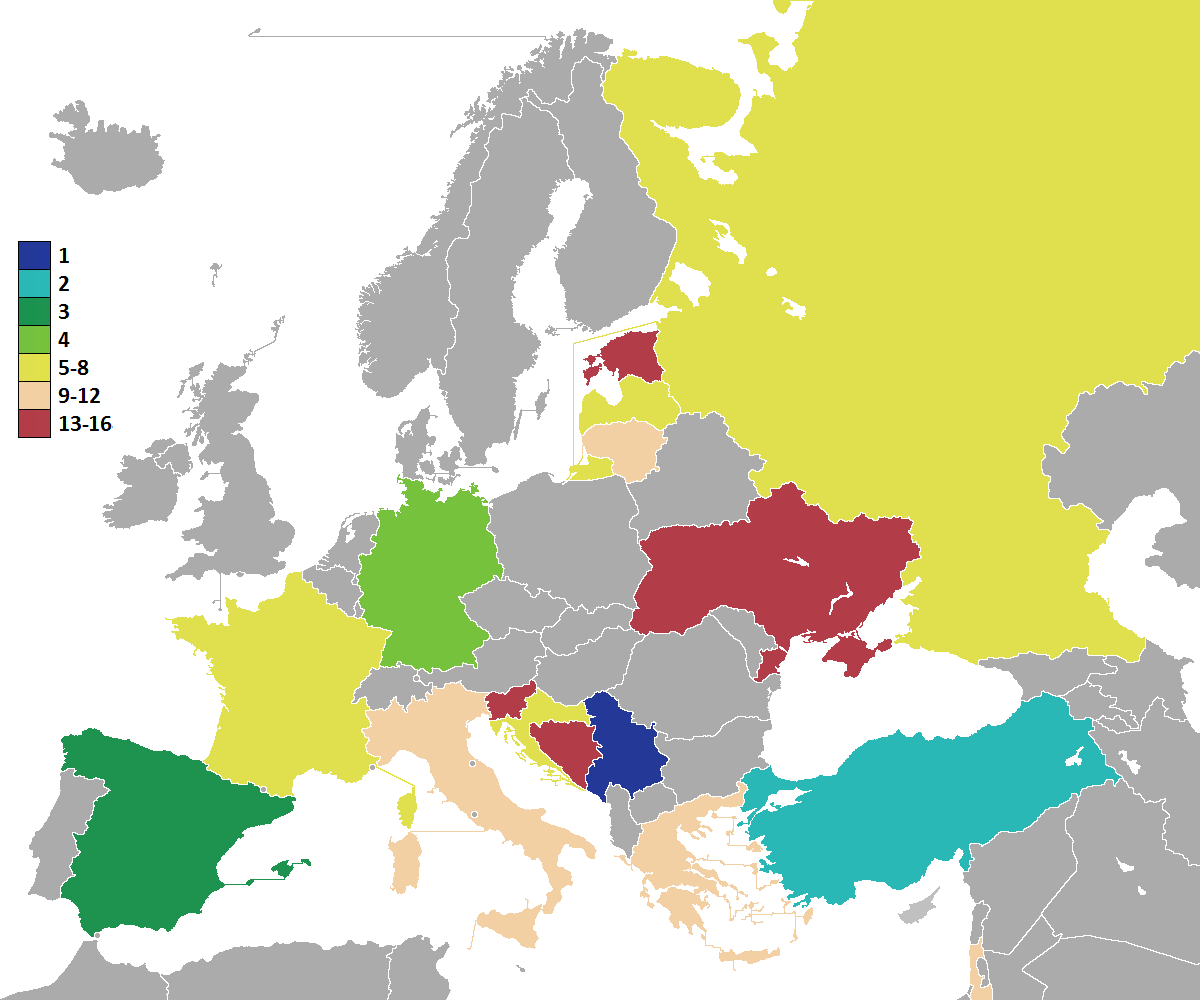
Results

Qualified for the 2002 FIBA World Championship
Qualified for the 2002 FIBA World Championship as current Olympic Champion

Rank	Team	Record
1st place, gold medalist(s)	Yugoslavia	6–0
2nd place, silver medalist(s)	Turkey	4–2
3rd place, bronze medalist(s)	Spain	5–2
4	Germany	4–3
5	Russia	4–2
6	France	3–3
7	Croatia	3–4
8	Latvia	2–5
9	Greece	2–2
10	Israel	1–3
11	Italy	2–2
12	Lithuania	2–2
13	Bosnia and Herzegovina	0–3
14	Estonia	0–3
15	Slovenia	1–2
16	Ukraine	1–2

1st	2nd	3rd	4th
Yugoslavia Dejan Bodiroga; Veselin Petrović; Saša Obradović; Igor Rakočević; Peja Stojaković; Vlado Šćepanović; Marko Jarić; Predrag Drobnjak; Dragan Tarlać; Dejan Milojević; Dejan Tomašević; Milan Gurović	Turkey Kerem Tunçeri; Hedo Türkoğlu; Mirsad Türkcan; Orhun Ene; Asım Pars; Harun Erdenay; İbrahim Kutluay; Kaya Peker; Hüseyin Beşok; Mehmet Okur; Haluk Yıldırım; Ömer Onan	Spain Pau Gasol; Chuck Kornegay; Paco Vázquez; Juan Carlos Navarro; Ignacio Rodríguez; Felipe Reyes; Carlos Jiménez; Lucio Angulo; José Antonio Paraíso; Raül López; Alfonso Reyes (basketball); Jorge Garbajosa	Germany Mithat Demirel; Ademola Okulaja; Robert Garrett; Marko Pešić; Stefano Garris; Dražan Tomić; Marvin Willoughby; Stipo Papić; Stephen Arigbabu; Patrick Femerling; Dirk Nowitzki; Shawn Bradley
