= İstanbul Teknik Üniversitesi B.K. =

İTÜ
- Founded: 1953; 73 years ago
- History: İstanbul Teknik Üniversitesi B.K. (1953–present)
- Arena: Darüşşafaka Ayhan Şahenk Sports Hall
- Capacity: 2,500
- Location: Istanbul, Turkey
- Team colors: Maroon, white
- President: Kemal Erdenay
- Head coach: Andaç Yapıcıer
- Team captain: Mehmet Yağmur
- Championships: 5 Turkish Championships; 2 Turkish Cups
Home	Away

İstanbul Teknik Üniversitesi B.K. (English: Istanbul Technical University Basketball Club), commonly abbreviated as İTÜ BK or simply İTÜ, is a Turkish professional basketball club that is based in Istanbul, Turkey. It plays in the Turkish Basketball League, and has won the league championship five times. Their home arena is the ITU Ayazaga Sports Center in Istanbul Technical University's Maslak campus.

Some of the well-known players that have played with the club over the years are İbrahim Kutluay, Harun Erdenay and Hüseyin Alp.

== History ==
The ITÜ basketball team was founded by former president of the Istanbul Technical University İlhami Civaoğlu and ITU graduate Nami Sukal in 1953. The team participated at the first Turkish Basketball League in the 1966–67 season. The golden era of the club was between 1967 and 1973. During this period, the team won 5 out of 6 national championships.

After 1973, İTÜ gradually declined and relegated to the second league for the first time in the 1977–78 season. The team played first-tier basketball between 1979 and 1994, 1996–1998, 1999–2000 and 2001–2006. In the 2010–11 season, İTÜ once again was relegated to the third-tier but returned to the second league in the 2012–13 season. However, the club faced two successive relegations between 2014 and 2016 and ended up in the Regional Basketball League.

== Honours ==
Turkish League

- Winners (5): 1968, 1970, 1971, 1972, 1973

Turkish Cup

- Winners (2): 1969, 1971

== Players ==
=== Current roster ===
İstanbul Teknik Üniversitesi B.K. roster
Players
Coaches

Pos.	No.	Nat.	Name	Ht.	Wt.	Age
F	1	(Turkey)	Selen, Burak	2.02 m (6 ft 8 in)		37 – 14 November 1988
G/F	3	(Turkey)	Say, Semih	1.94 m (6 ft 4 in)		28 – 11 March 1998
G	4	(Turkey)	Yağmur, Mehmet (C)	1.88 m (6 ft 2 in)		39 – 1 July 1987
G	9	(Turkey)	Baykan, Oğulcan	1.96 m (6 ft 5 in)		30 – 7 January 1996
G	10	(Turkey)	Akçay, Yunus	1.91 m (6 ft 3 in)		37 – 29 January 1989
F	13	(United States)	Huff, Cole	2.03 m (6 ft 8 in)	93 kg (205 lb)	32 – 28 March 1994
C	14	(Turkey)	Tekin, Ramazan	2.14 m (7 ft 0 in)		33 – 27 July 1993
G	21	(Turkey)	Oktay, Alp	1.89 m (6 ft 2 in)		25 – 9 February 2001
PF	33	(United States)	Campbell, Antonio	2.06 m (6 ft 9 in)	120 kg (265 lb)	33 – 24 December 1992
PG	––	(Turkey)	Eroğlu, Erbil	1.94 m (6 ft 4 in)	82 kg (181 lb)	33 – 23 January 1993

Head coach

- (Turkey) Andaç Yapıcıer

Assistant coach(es)

- (Turkey) Sinan Kağıtçı
- (Turkey) Tuncay Bostancı

Legend

- (C) Team captain
- (DP) Development player
- (I) Import player
- Injured

- Roster
Updated: 27 February 2020

== Notable players ==
Note: Flags indicate national team eligibility at FIBA-sanctioned events. Players may hold other non-FIBA nationalities not displayed.

Criteria

To appear in this section a player must have either:

- Set a club record or won an individual award while at the club
- Played at least one official international match for their national team at any time
- Played at least one official NBA match at any time.

- Cenk Akyol
- Hüseyin Alp
- Onuralp Bitim
- Orhun Ene
- Harun Erdenay
- Erbil Eroğlu
- Kerem Gönlüm
- Güray Kanan
- Erman Kunter
- İbrahim Kutluay
- Levent Topsakal
- Reggie Freeman
- Raško Katić
- Vladimir Štimac

== See also ==
- Istanbul Technical University
