= Kunt =

Kunt is a Turkish surname. It means "strong" or "durable" in Old Turkic.

Notable people with the surname include:

- Burakcan Kunt (born 1992), Turkish soccer player
- Josef Kunt (1904–1982), Czech fencer
- Murat Kunt (born 1945), Swiss scientist

== See also ==
- Kunter, a Turkish and German name
- Cunt, a vulgar word
- Kunt and the Gang (born 1973), British musical comedian
