= Harun Erdenay =

Turkish basketball player (born 1968)

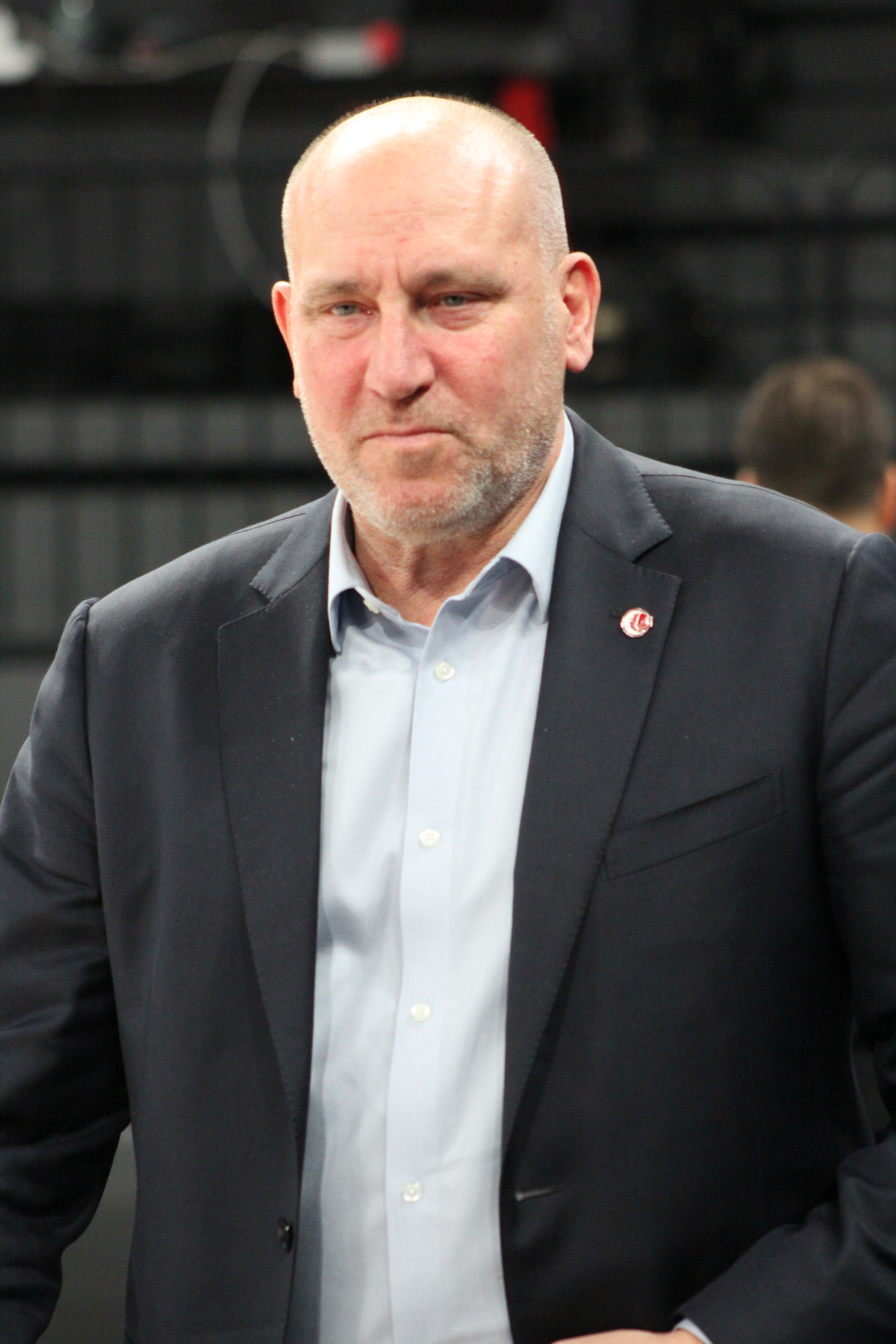
- Erdenay in 2024

President of the Turkish Basketball Federation
- In office 30 March 2015 – 26 October 2016
- Preceded by: Turgay Demirel
- Succeeded by: Hidayet Türkoğlu

Personal details
- Born: 27 May 1968 (age 58) Ankara, Turkey
- Occupation: Basketball player / executive
- Basketball career

Personal information
- Listed height: 6 ft 3 in (1.91 m)
- Listed weight: 195 lb (88 kg)

Career information
- NBA draft: 1990: undrafted
- Playing career: 1985–2008
- Position: Shooting guard / small forward
- Number: 9

Career history
- 1985–1990: İTÜ
- 1990–1992: Paşabahçe
- 1992–1993: İTÜ
- 1993–1994: Fenerbahçe
- 1994–2003: Ülkerspor
- 2003–2005: İTÜ
- 2005–2006: Mersin BB
- 2006–2008: İTÜ

Career highlights
- As player: 3× Turkish League champion (1995, 1998, 2001); 2× Turkish Cup winner (1992, 2003); 3× Turkish Supercup winner (1995, 2001, 2002); 3× Turkish League Top Scorer (1990, 1993, 2005)

Hakkı Harun Erdenay (born 27 May 1968 in Ankara) (nickname: "Pegasus") is a Turkish former professional basketball player, and he is a Vice President of the Turkish Basketball Federation. As a player, he was famous for his spectacular 3-point shooting. At a height of 1.91 m (6 ft 3 in) tall, he played in shooting guard and small forward positions.

== Professional playing career ==
During his pro career, Erdenay was a three-time Top Scorer of the Turkish Super League, in 1990, 1993, and 2005.

== National team playing career ==
Erdenay was a member of the senior Turkish national team. With Turkey, he played at the 1993 EuroBasket, the 1995 EuroBasket, the 1997 EuroBasket, the 2001 EuroBasket, and the 2002 FIBA World Championship. He won a silver medal at the 2001 EuroBasket.

== Post-playing career ==
As the manager of the Turkish Basketball Federation (TBF), Erdenay managed the senior Turkish national basketball team at some of the following tournaments:

- 2006 FIBA World Championship: 6th place
- 2007 EuroBasket: 11th place
- 2009 EuroBasket: 8th place
- 2010 FIBA World Championship: Silver

He was elected the President of the Turkish Basketball Federation in 2015.

== Personal life ==
His father, Kemal Erdenay, was also a former basketball player, and played with İTÜ and the senior Turkish national basketball team.

Erdenay was married to Gergana Branzova, a Bulgarian former basketball player. They were married in 2003, and divorced in 2014. They have three children.

In 2023, Erdenay married to his longtime girlfriend, Turkish-American business woman Pinar Senyilmaz who works for GE HealthCare, as Director of Strategic Academic Accounts in Interventional Radiology for Canada and USA. She was also a former professional volleyball player for Eczacıbaşı and Vakıfbank in early until early 90's.

== Awards and accomplishments ==
=== Pro clubs ===
- 3× Turkish Super League Top Scorer: (1990, 1993, 1995)
- 2× Turkish Cup Winner: (1992, 2003)
- 3× Turkish Super League Champion: (1995, 1998, 2001)
- 3× Turkish Presidential Cup Winner: (1995, 2001, 2002)
- Turkish All-Star Game: (2005, 2006)
- Turkish All-Star Game 3 Point Shootout Champion: (2006)

=== Turkish senior national team ===
- 2001 EuroBasket: Silver
